= List of Melbourne Football Club players =

This is a list of every player to have at least played one senior VFL/AFL game for Melbourne Football Club since the inception of the VFL, of which Melbourne was a foundation club, in 1897.

Players are listed in order of debut. The start of their Melbourne Football Club career is determined from when they were first listed at the club, and the end is determined by the final year they were listed at Melbourne. Players are numbered by their debut order for the club; when multiple players debuted during the same match, they are numbered according to the alphabetical order of their surnames.

== Melbourne Football Club players ==
Key
Order	Players are listed in order of debut
Seasons	Includes Melbourne only careers and spans from when a player was first listed with the club to their final year on the list
Debut	Debuts are for VFL/AFL regular season and finals series matches only
Games	Statistics are for VFL/AFL regular season and finals series matches only and are correct to the end of 2025.
Goals	Statistics are for VFL/AFL regular season and finals series matches only and are correct to the end of 2025.
^{^}	Currently listed players

=== 1890s ===
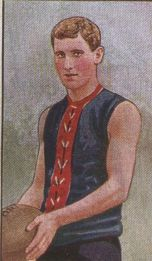
Charlie Young became Melbourne's first 100-game player in 1903

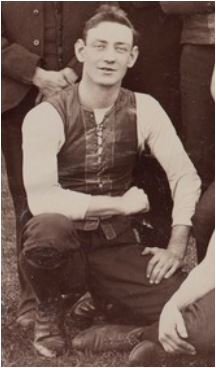
Ned Sutton was Melbourne's first captain in the VFL

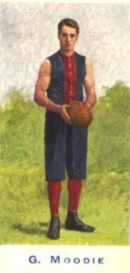
George Moodie played 134 matches for Melbourne from 1897 to 1905 including the 1900 premiership

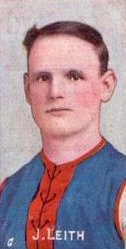
Jack Leith played 133 matches for Melbourne from 1897 to 1912 including the 1900 premiership

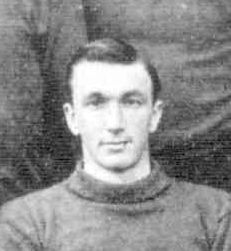
Australian Football Hall of Fame member, William McClelland

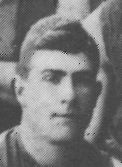
Australian Football Hall of Fame member, Vic Cumberland

Order	Name	Seasons	Debut	Games	Goals	Source
1	Fred Blackham	1897	round 1, 1897	2	0	
2	Herbert Fry	1897–1898	round 1, 1897	6	1	
3	Charlie Goding	1897–1898	round 1, 1897	4	1	
4	Edwin Jenkyn	1897	round 1, 1897	17	2	
5	George Johnstone	1897–1898	round 1, 1897	8	0	
6	Jack Leith	1897–1908, 1911–1912	round 1, 1897	133	162	
7	Austin Lewis	1897–1903	round 1, 1897	87	9	
8	Bill McCulloch	1897–1900	round 1, 1897	13	8	
9	Fred McGinis	1897–1901	round 1, 1897	84	36	
10	Norm McLeod	1897–1898	round 1, 1897	18	0	
11	Henry Mitchell	1897–1899	round 1, 1897	36	1	
12	George Moodie	1897–1905	round 1, 1897	134	29	
13	George Moysey	1897–1899	round 1, 1897	35	25	
14	Bert Robinson	1897	round 1, 1897	13	2	
15	Fred Sheahan	1897	round 1, 1897	16	0	
16	Wally Steele	1897–1898	round 1, 1897	26	12	
17	Ned Sutton	1897–1898	round 1, 1897	32	0	
18	Bert Watson	1897	round 1, 1897	11	0	
19	Alf Wood	1897–1899	round 1, 1897	46	4	
20	Charlie Young	1897–1904	round 1, 1897	129	46	
21	Maurie Herring	1897–1904	round 2, 1897	68	3	
22	Dave Strahan	1897–1900	round 2, 1897	29	0	
23	Jim McCoy	1897	round 3, 1897	1	0	
24	Arthur Kirk	1897	round 4, 1897	1	0	
25	Lew Massey	1897	round 4, 1897	8	1	
26	John Timothee	1897–1898	round 4, 1897	8	1	
27	Jack Graham	1897–1899	round 5, 1897	8	2	
28	Alf Healing	1897	round 6, 1897	10	0	
29	Dick Wardill	1897–1902	round 6, 1897	60	37	
30	Tom Crawford	1897	round 8, 1897	1	0	
31	Jack Godby	1897	round 8, 1897	1	0	
32	Alex Murdoch	1897	round 8, 1897	1	0	
33	Stewart Geddes	1897–1905	round 11, 1897	81	8	
34	Walter Lyon	1897	round 11, 1897	1	0	
35	Jimmy Russell	1897–1898	round 12, 1897	5	4	
36	Eddie Sholl	1897–1902	round 12, 1897	50	2	
37	Harry Hughes	1897	semi final, 1897	2	0	
38	Gerald Sheahan	1897	semi final, 1897	1	0	
39	Eddie Byers	1898–1900	round 1, 1898	20	0	
40	Tom Davey	1898	round 1, 1898	8	0	
41	Denis Lanigan	1898	round 1, 1898	16	1	
42	Les MacPherson	1898–1899	round 1, 1898	5	1	
43	Bob Moore	1898	round 1, 1898	2	0	
44	Richard Pirrie	1898–1900	round 1, 1898	24	11	
45	Bobby Royle	1898	round 1, 1898	3	0	
46	Percy Howard	1898	round 2, 1898	5	4	
47	Frank Staines	1898	round 2, 1898	5	0	
48	Jimmy Aitken	1898	round 7, 1898	4	0	
49	Pat Scanlan	1898–1899	round 8, 1898	6	2	
50	Johnny Coghlan	1898	round 9, 1898	5	0	
51	William McClelland	1898–1904	round 11, 1898	75	3	
52	Les Rippon	1898–1902	round 12, 1898	56	6	
53	Jack Davidson	1898–1899	round 13, 1898	10	0	
54	Henry Hagenauer	1898	round 13, 1898	1	0	
55	Dick Robertson	1898	round 13, 1898	5	0	
56	Art Atkinson	1898	round 14, 1898	4	1	
57	Harold Rippon	1898–1903	round 14, 1898	4	0	
58	Bill Atkinson	1898	round 15, 1898	3	0	
59	Vic Cumberland	1898–1902	round 15, 1898	50	15	
60	Norm Rippon	1898–1901	round 16, 1898	1	0	
61	Fred Elliott	1899	round 1, 1899	12	4	
62	Charlie Illingworth	1899	round 1, 1899	14	0	
63	Dan Moriarty	1899–1903	round 1, 1899	62	2	
64	Tommy Ryan	1899–1904	round 1, 1899	55	63	
65	Arthur Sowden	1899–1906	round 1, 1899	117	13	
66	Laurie Paul	1899, 1902	round 3, 1899	2	2	
67	Curtis Reid	1899–1903	round 3, 1899	20	0	
68	Cec Cumberland	1899	round 5, 1899	5	3	
69	Joe Finlay	1899	round 17, 1899	1	0	
70	Leo Rankin	1899	round 17, 1899	1	0	
71	Arthur Sinclair	1899	round 17, 1899	1	0	

=== 1900s ===
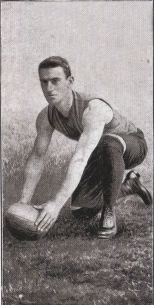
Former captain and three-time Melbourne leading goalkicker, Vin Coutie played 152 matches for Melbourne from 1901 to 1911

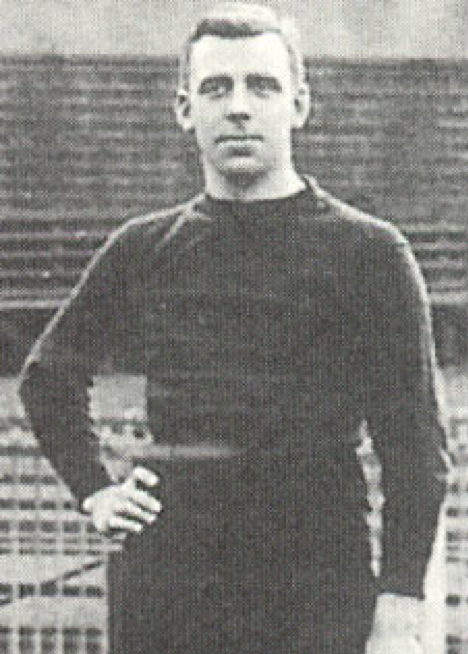
Joe Pearce played 152 matches for Melbourne and before being killed in service on Anzac Day in 1915

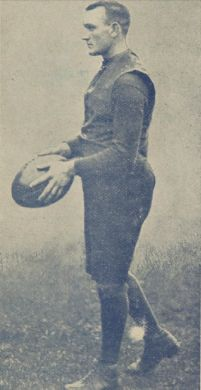
Bobby Monk played 125 matches for Melbourne from 1907 to 1914

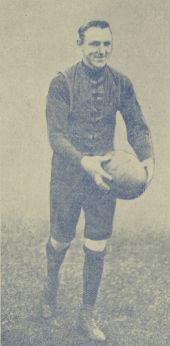
Bill McKenzie played 112 matches for Melbourne from 1909 to 1919

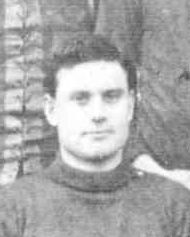
Jack Purse played 109 matches for Melbourne from 1900 to 1908, including the 1900 premiership

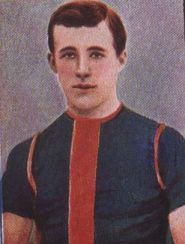
Former captain, Frank Langley played 89 matches for Melbourne from 1900 to 1906, including the 1900 premiership

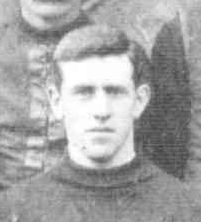
Harry Parkin played 85 matches for Melbourne from 1900 to 1906, including the 1900 premiership

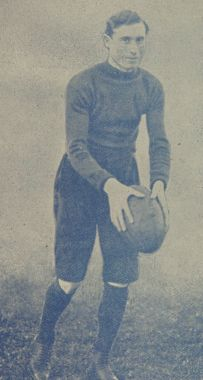
Former captain, Hugh Purse played 84 matches for Melbourne from 1904 to 1915

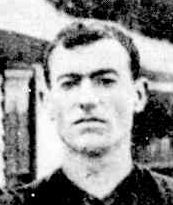
Former captain, Bernie Nolan played 84 matches for Melbourne from 1904 to 1912

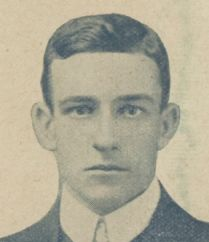
Three-time Melbourne leading goalkicker and two-time VFL leading goalkicker, Harry Brereton

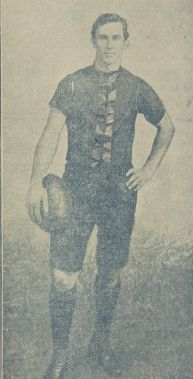
Jim Fitzpatrick played 81 matches for Melbourne from 1907 to 1913

Order	Name	Seasons	Debut	Games	Goals	Source
72	Ernie Adams	1900–1901	round 1, 1900	11	6	
73	Bill Bowe	1900–1906	round 1, 1900	74	3	
74	Corrie Gardner	1900–1905	round 1, 1900	48	0	
75	Frank Langley	1900–1906	round 1, 1900	89	61	
76	Bryan McGuigan	1900	round 1, 1900	2	0	
77	Jack Purse	1900–1908	round 1, 1900	110	12	
78	Harry Parkin	1900–1906	round 2, 1900	87	0	
79	Harry Graham	1900	round 8, 1900	2	3	
80	Eric Gardner	1900–1903	round 9, 1900	39	13	
81	Harold Hay	1900	round 12, 1900	7	2	
82	Ced Hay	1900	round 14, 1900	1	0	
83	Harold Riggall	1900	round 14, 1900	1	1	
84	Jim McLean	1901, 1903	round 1, 1901	13	5	
85	Graham Colclough	1901	round 2, 1901	11	8	
86	Billy Shaw	1901	round 2, 1901	1	0	
87	Ed Garlick	1901	round 3, 1901	1	0	
88	Lindsay Anderson	1901–1906	round 6, 1901	16	3	
89	Laurie Ogilvie	1901	round 6, 1901	4	3	
90	Alf Tredinnick	1901	round 8, 1901	7	1	
91	Harry Boully	1901–1902	round 9, 1901	8	3	
92	Vin Coutie	1901–1911	round 9, 1901	152	212	
93	Harold de Gruchy	1901	round 10, 1901	1	0	
94	Jack Strong	1901–1912	round 10, 1901	78	29	
95	Bert Wregg	1901	round 13, 1901	3	3	
96	George Cathie	1901–1902	round 16, 1901	15	14	
97	Ern Hocking	1902–1903	round 1, 1902	25	8	
98	Leslie Rainey	1902–1903	round 1, 1902	18	17	
99	Arthur Britt	1902	round 4, 1902	1	2	
100	Bob Puflett	1902	round 6, 1902	4	0	
101	Horrie Drane	1902, 1904–1906	round 8, 1902	38	11	
102	Syd Anderson	1902–1907	round 9, 1902	53	10	
103	Jim Byrne	1902	round 12, 1902	1	0	
104	Bobby Craig	1902	round 15, 1902	3	0	
105	Syd Dalrymple	1902	round 17, 1902	2	0	
106	Harry Cordner	1903, 1905	round 1, 1903	11	16	
107	Jack Gardiner	1903–1908	round 1, 1903	70	54	
108	Harry Henderson	1903–1906	round 1, 1903	57	2	
109	Paddy Mills	1903–1909	round 1, 1903	83	15	
110	Ernie Tout	1903–1904	round 1, 1903	19	3	
111	Billy Bremner	1903–1904	round 2, 1903	23	1	
112	Albert Gourlay	1903	round 3, 1903	3	1	
113	Artie McSpeerin	1903	round 5, 1903	1	0	
114	Alby Pilcher	1903	round 5, 1903	1	0	
115	Jimmy Burn	1903	round 6, 1903	1	0	
116	Tom Jackson	1903	round 6, 1903	1	0	
117	Don McKellar	1903, 1905	round 16, 1903	4	0	
118	Fred Watson	1903	round 16, 1903	1	0	
119	Jim Conquest	1904–1908	round 1, 1904	54	22	
120	Ted Leach	1904, 1909	round 1, 1904	23	9	
121	Bernie Nolan	1904–1912	round 1, 1904	84	10	
122	Hugh Purse	1904–1909, 1912, 1915	round 1, 1904	84	26	
123	Lionel Smale	1904	round 1, 1904	2	0	
124	Ernie Vollugi	1904	round 1, 1904	4	0	
125	Tom Watson	1904	round 1, 1904	1	0	
126	Henri Jeanneret	1904	round 2, 1904	4	0	
127	Joe Pearce	1904–1913	round 2, 1904	152	5	
128	Alec Woods	1904	round 2, 1904	1	0	
129	Ted Wade	1904	round 3, 1904	1	0	
130	Roy Adam	1904–1905	round 6, 1904	12	3	
131	Mark Gardner	1904–1905, 1907	round 8, 1904	14	1	
132	Fred Howard	1905–1906	round 1, 1905	24	0	
133	Les Minto	1905	round 1, 1905	1	1	
134	George Peacock	1905–1907	round 2, 1905	35	11	
135	Jim Trend	1905	round 2, 1905	3	3	
136	Edward Cordner	1905	round 3, 1905	7	0	
137	Art Gilchrist	1905	round 5, 1905	2	0	
138	Alick Ogilvie	1905	round 7, 1905	1	1	
139	Charlie MacKay	1905–1906	round 9, 1905	12	7	
140	Ern Penrose	1905	round 13, 1905	1	0	
141	Frank Brown	1905–1906	round 14, 1905	5	0	
142	Vin Gardiner	1905	round 15, 1905	2	0	
143	Ernest Denton	1905	round 17, 1905	1	0	
144	Ted Fleming	1905	round 17, 1905	1	0	
145	Frank Hurrey	1905–1906	round 17, 1905	3	0	
146	William Marshall	1905	round 17, 1905	1	0	
147	Basil Onyons	1905–1908	round 17, 1905	37	32	
148	Alec McDonald	1906	round 1, 1906	1	0	
149	Jack McIntosh	1906	round 1, 1906	4	1	
150	Fred Sleeman	1906	round 1, 1906	14	4	
151	Hedley Tomkins	1906, 1910–1913	round 1, 1906	71	25	
152	Spencer Hayman	1906	round 2, 1906	6	0	
153	Willie Rogers	1906	round 2, 1906	8	0	
154	Clyde Stanway	1906	round 2, 1906	13	1	
155	Percy Hordern	1906	round 8, 1906	5	1	
156	Lyle Morgan	1906	round 8, 1906	2	0	
157	Frank McCooey	1906	round 10, 1906	4	0	
158	Henry Smith	1906	round 11, 1906	1	0	
159	George Richards	1906	round 12, 1906	2	0	
160	Harold Stanley	1906	round 12, 1906	1	1	
161	Norm Stephenson	1906	round 13, 1906	1	0	
162	Charlie Taylor	1906	round 15, 1906	3	1	
163	Frank Boynton	1906	round 16, 1906	1	0	
164	Reg Woodhouse	1906	round 16, 1906	2	0	
165	Lance Sleeman	1906	round 17, 1906	1	0	
166	Charles Suhr	1906	round 17, 1906	1	0	
167	Jack West	1906–1907	round 17, 1906	4	0	
168	Jack Baquie	1907–1908, 1914–1915, 1919–1920	round 1, 1907	47	15	
169	Joe Canavan	1907	round 1, 1907	9	4	
170	Bert Gregory	1907	round 1, 1907	2	1	
171	Bill Homan	1907–1908	round 1, 1907	18	4	
172	Bobby Monk	1907–1914	round 1, 1907	125	15	
173	Victor Nielsen	1907	round 1, 1907	8	1	
174	Bert Parke	1907–1910, 1912	round 1, 1907	30	0	
175	Jack Smith	1907–1909, 1911	round 1, 1907	51	27	
176	Wally Sykes	1907–1912	round 1, 1907	43	17	
177	Harry Symonds	1907	round 1, 1907	4	3	
178	Harry Cope	1907–1913	round 3, 1907	52	6	
179	Frank Harris	1907–1912	round 3, 1907	61	3	
180	Phil Hunt	1907	round 3, 1907	8	0	
181	Charlie Johnston	1907	round 3, 1907	8	6	
182	Jack Johnston	1907–1908	round 3, 1907	16	3	
183	Wal Warren	1907	round 3, 1907	1	0	
184	Harry Rigby	1907–1908	round 4, 1907	56	2	
185	Jack Hammond	1907	round 5, 1907	2	2	
186	Herbert Hill	1907	round 7, 1907	8	0	
187	Jim Fitzpatrick	1907–1913	round 9, 1907	81	39	
188	Harry Cox	1907	round 16, 1907	2	2	
189	Jack Donaldson	1908	round 1, 1908	9	3	
190	Herb Friend	1908	round 1, 1908	2	0	
191	Alex Holland	1908	round 1, 1908	1	0	
192	Alf Jones	1908–1909	round 1, 1908	24	18	
193	Bill Tottey	1908	round 1, 1908	14	6	
194	Bill Gillespie	1908	round 2, 1908	1	0	
195	George McCart	1908	round 2, 1908	1	0	
196	Henry Wright	1908–1909	round 2, 1908	18	1	
197	Len Norman	1908–1909	round 3, 1908	30	15	
198	Joe Bray	1908	round 4, 1908	3	0	
199	Andy Kennedy	1908	round 5, 1908	1	0	
200	Albert Bickford	1908–1909	round 7, 1908	9	0	
201	George Martin	1908	round 7, 1908	2	2	
202	Joe Hodgkins	1908–1911	round 8, 1908	24	23	
203	Fred Hewitt	1908–1910	round 10, 1908	29	3	
204	Jim Bonella	1908	round 18, 1908	1	0	
205	Dick Fowler	1908	round 18, 1908	1	0	
206	Harry Brereton	1909–1912, 1915	round 1, 1909	85	187	
207	Vern Daniel	1909, 1912	round 1, 1909	5	1	
208	Jim Fargie	1909	round 1, 1909	5	1	
209	George McNeilage	1909	round 1, 1909	1	0	
210	Hughie Odgers	1909–1912, 1920	round 1, 1909	59	2	
211	Jim Cowell	1909	round 2, 1909	7	1	
212	William Flintoft	1909–1912	round 3, 1909	42	18	
213	Les Irwin	1909–1910	round 3, 1909	14	4	
214	Jack Robertson	1909–1913	round 3, 1909	60	16	
215	Bill Fischer	1909	round 5, 1909	1	0	
216	Con Doherty	1909	round 6, 1909	1	0	
217	Percy Beswicke	1909–1910	round 6, 1909	11	1	
218	Bill Maxwell	1909	round 11, 1909	2	1	
219	George Oliver	1909	round 13, 1909	1	0	
220	Billy McBean	1909	round 15, 1909	1	0	
221	David Bell	1909–1910	round 16, 1909	16	4	
222	Bill McKenzie	1909–1915, 1919	round 16, 1909	112	11	
223	George Woods	1909	round 17, 1909	2	1	

=== 1910s ===
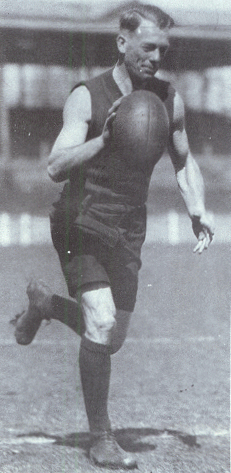
Australian Football and Melbourne Hall of Fame member, and two-time Brownlow Medallist, Ivor Warne-Smith

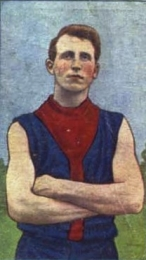
Bill Allen played 142 matches for Melbourne from 1910 to 1915 and 1919 to 1923

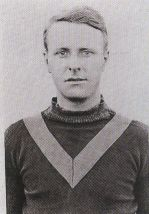
Charlie Lilley played 132 matches for Melbourne from 1913 to 1915 and 1919 to 1925

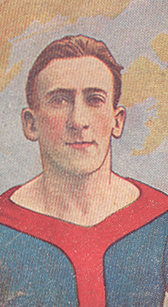
George Heinz was a player-coach in his first season at Melbourne in 1919, playing 106 matches in total from 1919 to 1925

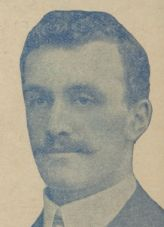
Bill Hendrie played 87 matches for Melbourne from 1910 to 1915

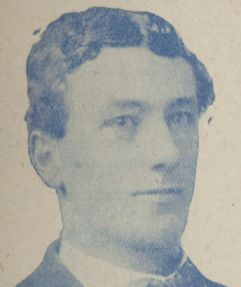
Jack Evans played 61 matches for Melbourne from 1912 to 1915 and 1919

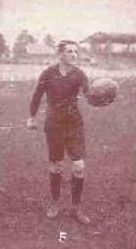
Jack House played 56 matches for Melbourne from 1919 to 1923

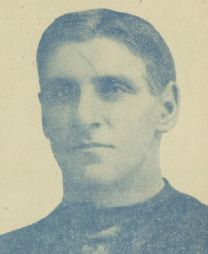
Former captain, Alf George played 55 matches for Melbourne from 1911 to 1915

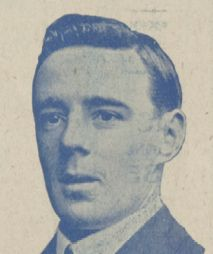
Jack McKenzie was Melbourne's captain in 1915 before the club went into recess due to World War I

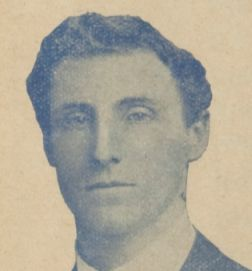
Two-time premiership player for Fitzroy, Wally Naismith played 36 matches for Melbourne from 1911 to 1912

Order	Name	Seasons	Debut	Games	Goals	Source
224	Tommy Crow	1910	round 1, 1910	7	1	
225	Alex Rennolds	1910	round 1, 1910	5	0	
226	Reg Werner	1910	round 1, 1910	2	3	
227	Stan Fairbairn	1910–1911, 1914	round 3, 1910	30	41	
228	Bill Hendrie	1910–1915	round 3, 1910	87	40	
229	Les Mitchell	1910	round 3, 1910	3	1	
230	Herbert Rodd	1910	round 3, 1910	9	5	
231	Bill Allen	1910–1915, 1919–1923	round 5, 1910	142	54	
232	Bill Henderson	1910–1911	round 5, 1910	15	0	
233	Vernon Hazel	1910	round 6, 1910	4	4	
234	Bert Morris	1910	round 6, 1910	1	0	
235	Ernie McMaster	1910	round 7, 1910	2	0	
236	Michael George	1910	round 8, 1910	3	0	
237	Fred Whelpton	1910–1911	round 9, 1910	6	0	
238	Otto Landmann	1910	round 11, 1910	2	1	
239	Archie Pratt	1910	round 12, 1910	3	0	
240	Tom Sadlier	1910	round 12, 1910	1	0	
241	Cyril Steele	1910	round 12, 1910	3	0	
242	Cecil Quinlan	1910	round 17, 1910	2	1	
243	Bill McKeone	1911	round 1, 1911	1	0	
244	Wally Naismith	1911–1912	round 1, 1911	36	0	
245	George St. John	1911	round 1, 1911	1	0	
246	Alf George	1911–1913, 1915	round 2, 1911	55	12	
247	Billy Irwin	1911	round 2, 1911	2	1	
248	Jack Geggie	1911	round 3, 1911	1	0	
249	Ben Sheppard	1911	round 4, 1911	4	1	
250	Ken Edgar	1911	round 5, 1911	2	0	
251	Bill Hickey	1911–1912	round 5, 1911	20	1	
252	Jimmy Nolan	1911	round 5, 1911	1	0	
253	Leo Rush	1911	round 5, 1911	6	4	
254	Malcolm Kennedy	1911	round 6, 1911	17	4	
255	Harold Curran	1911	round 9, 1911	2	0	
256	Ted Politz	1911–1913	round 11, 1911	26	19	
257	Jim Moore	1911	round 14, 1911	1	0	
258	Jack Bristow	1912–1913	round 1, 1912	21	0	
259	Bert Francis	1912	round 1, 1912	5	1	
260	Tim Lane	1912	round 1, 1912	13	11	
261	Clarence Abbott	1912	round 2, 1912	1	0	
262	Les Abbott	1912	round 3, 1912	3	0	
263	Arthur Ferguson	1912	round 3, 1912	2	0	
264	Herb Joolen	1912–1913	round 5, 1912	16	11	
265	Jack Evans	1912–1915, 1919	round 8, 1912	61	5	
266	Michael Maguire	1912–1914	round 9, 1912	19	23	
267	Tom Wellington	1912–1913	round 11, 1912	9	0	
268	Charlie Armstrong	1913–1914, 1919	round 1, 1913	30	1	
269	Laurie Brady	1913	round 1, 1913	1	0	
270	Doug Chapman	1913	round 1, 1913	10	7	
271	Phil Hosking	1913	round 1, 1913	1	0	
272	Charlie Lilley	1913–1915, 1919–1925	round 1, 1913	132	5	
273	Frank Lugton	1913–1914	round 1, 1913	36	1	
274	Norm McDougall	1913	round 1, 1913	10	1	
275	Algy Millhouse	1913	round 1, 1913	10	4	
276	William Angwin	1913	round 2, 1913	3	0	
277	Campbell Brady	1913	round 2, 1913	9	12	
278	Percy Ellingsen	1913	round 3, 1913	2	1	
279	Jack Watt	1913–1914	round 3, 1913	18	7	
280	Frank Ellis	1913	round 5, 1913	6	0	
281	Norm Jordan	1913	round 5, 1913	1	0	
282	Carlyle Kenley	1913–1914	round 8, 1913	7	3	
283	Jim Mackie	1913	round 8, 1913	5	0	
284	Fen McDonald	1913	round 9, 1913	1	0	
285	Matt Incigneri	1913	round 10, 1913	2	0	
286	Arthur Maskell	1913	round 11, 1913	1	0	
287	Johnny Hassett	1913, 1915	round 12, 1913	17	11	
288	Jack Nicholson	1913	round 12, 1913	1	0	
289	Len Incigneri	1913–1915	round 13, 1913	33	7	
290	Fred Edwards	1913	round 16, 1913	3	2	
291	George Knight	1913	round 16, 1913	3	1	
292	Bill Daly	1913	round 17, 1913	2	1	
293	Eric Dimsey	1913	round 17, 1913	2	0	
294	Cliff Burge	1914	round 1, 1914	5	1	
295	Percy Colee	1914	round 1, 1914	5	3	
296	Tim Collins	1914–1915	round 1, 1914	20	20	
297	Vic Gordon	1914	round 1, 1914	15	4	
298	Jack Huntington	1914–1915, 1919–1920	round 1, 1914	43	43	
299	Herbert Roberts	1914	round 1, 1914	1	0	
300	Bert Trahair	1914	round 1, 1914	18	7	
301	George Walker	1914–1915, 1919–1921	round 1, 1914	49	0	
302	Harry Britter	1914	round 2, 1914	5	5	
303	Alec Gray	1914–1915, 1919–1921	round 2, 1914	52	0	
304	Eric Parsons	1914	round 2, 1914	2	0	
305	Wal Riddington	1914	round 2, 1914	1	0	
306	Billy Quinn	1914	round 3, 1914	11	2	
307	Roy Gray	1914	round 4, 1914	1	0	
308	Les Smith	1914	round 4, 1914	7	1	
309	Jack Woolley	1914	round 4, 1914	2	2	
310	Rupe Lowell	1914–1915	round 4, 1914	9	0	
311	Arthur Best	1914	round 6, 1914	12	30	
312	Jack Connole	1914, 1919	round 7, 1914	14	12	
313	Roy MacDonald	1914	round 7, 1914	7	2	
314	Alf Williamson	1914	round 7, 1914	8	5	
315	John Daly	1914	round 11, 1914	8	0	
316	Aubrey MacKenzie	1914	round 14, 1914	2	0	
317	Bill Brunier	1914–1915, 1919	round 15, 1914	9	8	
318	Alexander Fraser	1914–1915	round 16, 1914	10	2	
319	Claude Bryan	1915, 1920	round 1, 1915	15	1	
320	Jack Doubleday	1915	round 1, 1915	17	4	
321	Roy Franklin	1915	round 1, 1915	6	1	
322	Teddy Johnston	1915, 1919	round 1, 1915	11	1	
323	Jack McKenzie	1915	round 1, 1915	16	10	
324	Roy Park	1915	round 1, 1915	13	35	
325	Jack Brake	1915, 1920–1921	round 2, 1915	17	2	
326	Percy Rodriguez	1915	round 2, 1915	5	1	
327	Max Hislop	1915	round 5, 1915	1	0	
328	Reg Gibb	1915, 1919	round 11, 1915	11	1	
329	Ed Buckley	1915	round 15, 1915	3	1	
330	Bill Elston	1915	round 15, 1915	4	1	
331	Martin McQuade	1915	round 17, 1915	2	1	
332	Gordon Coulter	1919	round 1, 1919	8	2	
333	George Heinz	1919–1925	round 1, 1919	106	97	
334	Jack House	1919–1923	round 1, 1919	56	31	
335	Con Kenney	1919	round 1, 1919	9	5	
336	Bob Love	1919	round 1, 1919	8	1	
337	Percy Love	1919	round 1, 1919	11	6	
338	Herb Matthews Sr.	1919–1922	round 1, 1919	50	24	
339	John McMahon	1919	round 1, 1919	3	0	
340	Eric Tonkin	1919–1920	round 1, 1919	20	19	
341	Cyril Hall	1919	round 2, 1919	9	0	
342	Allan McLean	1919	round 2, 1919	5	0	
343	Alex Salvado	1919	round 2, 1919	5	2	
344	Frank Cummins	1919	round 5, 1919	1	0	
345	Howard Richardson	1919	round 5, 1919	1	0	
346	Charles Salvana	1919	round 5, 1919	6	3	
347	Stan Huntington	1919	round 7, 1919	3	3	
348	Les Nichols	1919	round 7, 1919	1	0	
349	Bill Shelton	1919–1925	round 7, 1919	54	17	
350	Leo Little	1919–1920	round 8, 1919	12	4	
351	Matt Connors	1919	round 9, 1919	3	0	
352	Bill Hore	1919	round 9, 1919	2	0	
353	Gordon Landy	1919	round 9, 1919	1	1	
354	Alec Mawhinney	1919	round 9, 1919	9	0	
355	Ivor Warne-Smith	1919, 1925–1932	round 10, 1919	146	110	
356	Bob Bodington	1919–1920	round 12, 1919	5	0	
357	Eric Chisholm	1919	round 12, 1919	5	2	
358	Alec Farrow	1919–1921	round 12, 1919	33	10	
359	Archie Grigg	1919	round 12, 1919	3	1	
360	Dave Elliman	1919, 1922–1924	round 16, 1919	20	18	
361	Harry Selover	1919	round 16, 1919	3	2	

=== 1920s ===
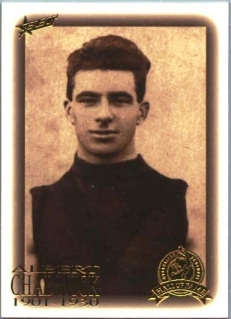
Melbourne Team of the Century member, Australian football and Melbourne Hall of Fame member, former captain and premiership player Albert Chadwick

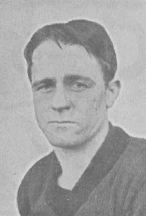
1926 premiership player, Dick Taylor played 161 matches for Melbourne

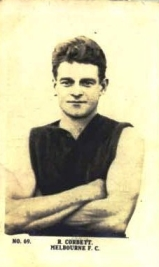
Bob Corbett played 161 matches for Melbourne from 1920 to 1929

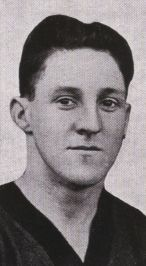
1926 premiership player, Jimmy Davidson played 137 matches for Melbourne

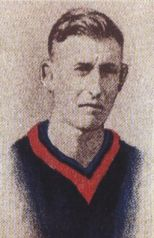
Gordon Ogden played 134 matches for Melbourne from 1928 to 1937

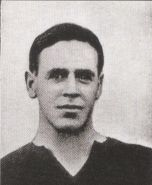
1926 premiership player, Charlie Streeter played 133 matches for Melbourne

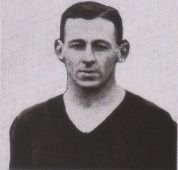
1926 premiership player, Jim Abernethy played 130 matches for Melbourne

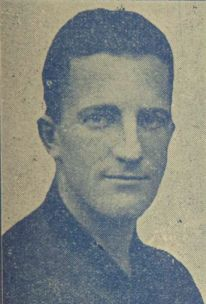
1926 premiership player, Jack Collins played 127 matches for Melbourne

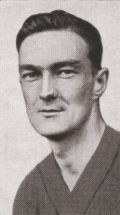
1926 premiership player and two-time Melbourne leading goalkicker, Bob Johnson played 113 matches for Melbourne

Order	Name	Seasons	Debut	Games	Goals	Source
362	Mick Anthony	1920–1924	round 1, 1920	52	4	
363	Albert Chadwick	1920–1928	round 1, 1920	141	47	
364	Bob Corbett	1920–1929	round 1, 1920	161	9	
365	Syd Hutcheson	1920	round 1, 1920	11	0	
366	Charlie Streeter	1920–1928	round 1, 1920	133	10	
367	Harry Harker	1920–1924	round 2, 1920	54	146	
368	Joseph O'Carroll	1920	round 2, 1920	3	2	
369	George Garlick	1920	round 4, 1920	5	4	
370	Vern Rowe	1920	round 4, 1920	7	7	
371	Bill Fawcett	1920	round 6, 1920	1	0	
372	Harry Tampling	1920	round 8, 1920	1	0	
373	Les Boyd	1920–1922	round 9, 1920	17	6	
374	Bruce Campbell	1920	round 9, 1920	5	4	
375	Bill McIntyre	1920	round 10, 1920	3	0	
376	Reg Ellis	1920	round 11, 1920	1	0	
377	Norm Henderson	1920	round 16, 1920	2	2	
378	Leo Dobrigh	1920	round 18, 1920	1	0	
379	Aubrey Neal	1920	round 18, 1920	1	0	
380	Harry Bruce	1921	round 1, 1921	7	1	
381	Harry Coy	1921–1928	round 1, 1921	115	4	
382	Joe Flanagan	1921–1924	round 1, 1921	36	1	
383	Clarrie Lethlean	1921	round 1, 1921	9	0	
384	John Lord	1921–1923	round 1, 1921	54	25	
385	Enos Thomas	1921	round 1, 1921	2	1	
386	Ted Thomas	1921–1932	round 1, 1921	104	3	
387	Percy Tulloh	1921–1927	round 1, 1921	69	115	
388	Percy Wilson	1921–1924	round 1, 1921	51	20	
389	Les Wallace	1921	round 2, 1921	1	0	
390	Pat Bourke	1921–1922	round 4, 1921	19	6	
391	Francis Lyon	1921	round 4, 1921	1	0	
392	Bill Lyte	1921	round 4, 1921	1	0	
393	Alex Ogilvy	1921	round 6, 1921	4	0	
394	Alf Wilson	1921–1925	round 8, 1921	41	10	
395	Fred Long	1921–1922	round 14, 1921	6	0	
396	Edgar Dunbar	1922, 1924	round 1, 1922	28	5	
397	Harold Dunbar	1922	round 1, 1922	5	2	
398	Hugh Dunbar	1922–1928	round 1, 1922	97	48	
399	Alf Oldham	1922	round 1, 1922	3	2	
400	John Corby	1922	round 6, 1922	1	1	
401	Artie Cambridge	1922	round 8, 1922	2	0	
402	Eric Peck	1922–1923	round 8, 1922	5	0	
403	Vern Moore	1922–1924	round 11, 1922	14	8	
404	Dick Taylor	1922–1931, 1935	round 18, 1922	164	100	
405	Jim Makin	1923	round 1, 1923	16	1	
406	Derek Mollison	1923–1928	round 1, 1923	66	30	
407	Jim Abernethy	1923–1932	round 2, 1923	130	61	
408	Jack Collins	1923–1931	round 5, 1923	127	7	
409	Bob Abernethy	1923	round 6, 1923	2	0	
410	Roy James	1923–1924	round 8, 1923	3	1	
411	Wally Carter	1923–1924	round 9, 1923	5	1	
412	Tom Elliott	1923–1924	round 9, 1923	11	2	
413	Jack Robertson	1923–1924	round 10, 1923	3	0	
414	Eric Donaldson	1923–1924	round 14, 1923	13	0	
415	Marcus Glasscock	1923–1924	round 16, 1923	6	0	
416	Johnny Egan	1924	round 1, 1924	3	1	
417	Stan Wittman	1924–1931	round 1, 1924	109	132	
418	Bobby Ewer	1924–1925	round 8, 1924	7	1	
419	George Simmonds	1924	round 13, 1924	4	4	
420	Jimmy Davidson	1924–1932	round 16, 1924	137	62	
421	Harry Davie	1924–1927	round 16, 1924	49	160	
422	Max Wright	1924–1925	round 18, 1924	2	0	
423	Gerry Donnelly	1925	round 1, 1925	12	4	
424	Frank Jorgensen	1925–1927	round 1, 1925	13	1	
425	Bill Tymms	1925–1933	round 1, 1925	91	7	
426	Jack Cannan	1925–1926	round 3, 1925	6	9	
427	Col Deane	1925–1930	round 4, 1925	82	53	
428	Ted Parker	1925	round 4, 1925	1	0	
429	Jimmy Sullivan	1925	round 5, 1925	6	0	
430	Harry Moyes	1925–1927	round 6, 1925	45	106	
431	Carlyle Jones	1925–1926, 1929	round 11, 1925	11	14	
432	Frank Richardson	1925	round 12, 1925	2	0	
433	Clarrie Wyatt	1925	round 16, 1925	1	0	
434	Eric Andersen	1926	round 1, 1926	2	2	
435	Ossie Green	1926, 1929, 1931	round 1, 1926	32	1	
436	Bob Johnson Sr.	1926–1933	round 1, 1926	113	302	
437	Tom O'Brien	1926	round 1, 1926	4	0	
438	Herbert White	1926–1929	round 1, 1926	67	27	
439	Bert Lawrence	1926	round 2, 1926	3	0	
440	Bruce Pie	1926	round 2, 1926	1	0	
441	Dave Duff	1926	round 3, 1926	11	26	
442	Jim Veal	1926–1927	round 3, 1926	4	1	
443	Fred Dick	1926–1927	round 9, 1926	6	1	
444	Francis Vine	1926–1934	grand final, 1926	105	41	
445	Peter Hannan	1927	round 1, 1927	2	0	
446	Eddie Shaw	1927	round 1, 1927	1	0	
447	Tommy McConville	1927–1929	round 4, 1927	35	58	
448	Les Meade	1927–1928	round 7, 1927	7	0	
449	Charles Young	1927	round 7, 1927	2	0	
450	Charlie Barnes	1927–1929	round 10, 1927	33	0	
451	Bill Latham	1927–1928	round 13, 1927	9	0	
452	Allan Hope	1928	round 1, 1928	4	7	
453	Gordon Ogden	1928–1937	round 1, 1928	134	3	
454	Vince Driver	1928–1930	round 4, 1928	9	0	
455	Barney Wood	1928	round 5, 1928	5	0	
456	Jim Moodie	1928–1932	round 6, 1928	16	3	
457	Gerry Beare	1928	round 7, 1928	2	0	
458	Jack Haw	1928–1929	round 7, 1928	13	6	
459	Ray Usher	1928–1933	round 11, 1928	82	2	
460	Claud Carr	1928–1929	round 16, 1928	4	0	
461	Bill London	1928	round 16, 1928	1	1	
462	Harry Long	1929–1937	round 1, 1929	117	21	
463	Bill MacDonald	1929–1931	round 1, 1929	32	3	
464	Henry McCrae	1929	round 1, 1929	3	7	
465	Wyn Murray	1929–1934	round 1, 1929	65	4	
466	Ted Esposito	1929–1932	round 3, 1929	40	12	
467	Art Beaumont	1929	round 5, 1929	2	0	
468	George Cassidy	1929–1931	round 9, 1929	13	5	
469	Alec Proudfoot	1929	round 14, 1929	1	0	
470	Mick Comber	1929	round 18, 1929	1	1	

=== 1930s ===
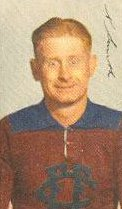
Australian Football and Melbourne Hall of Fame legend, Norm Smith won ten premierships in his time at Melbourne

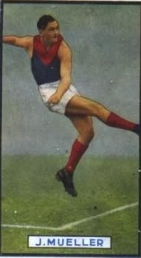
Australian Football and Melbourne Hall of Fame member, Team of the Century forward pocket and four-time premiership player, Jack Mueller

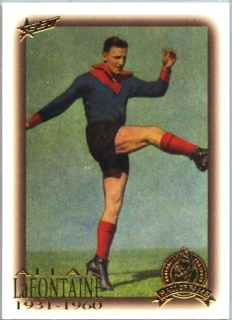
Australian Football and Melbourne Hall of Fame member, Team of the Century member, three-time premiership player and former captain, Allan La Fontaine

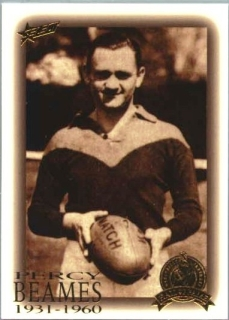
Australian Football and Melbourne Hall of Fame member, Team of the Century forward pocket, three-time premiership player and former captain, Percy Beames

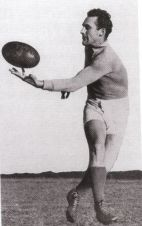
Melbourne Hall of Fame member, Team of the Century member, and 1947 premiership player Wally Lock

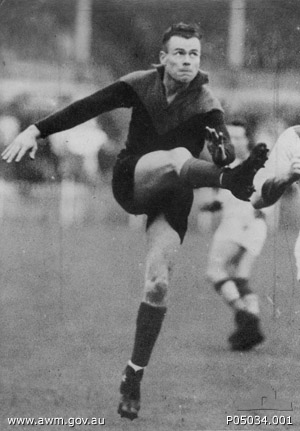
Ron Barassi Sr., the father of Australian Football and Melbourne Hall of Fame legend, Ron Barassi, played 58 matches for Melbourne including the 1940 premiership before dying in service in 1941

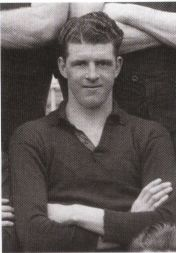
Ron Baggott played 133 matches for Melbourne from 1935 to 1945 including three premierships

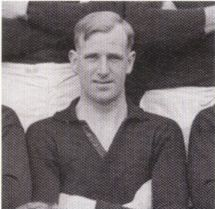
Melbourne Hall of Fame member, Maurie Gibb played 133 matches for Melbourne from 1934 to 1943 including two premierships

Order	Name	Seasons	Debut	Games	Goals	Source
471	Bill Cutler	1930–1931	round 1, 1930	22	6	
472	Hec Davidson	1930–1932	round 1, 1930	20	5	
473	Webber Jackson	1930–1932	round 1, 1930	24	5	
474	George Margitich	1930–1934	round 1, 1930	75	267	
475	Bill Vanthoff	1930–1934	round 1, 1930	60	42	
476	Colin Jackson	1930	round 2, 1930	2	0	
477	Edwin Pemberton	1930–1934	round 2, 1930	36	5	
478	Jack Power	1930–1934	round 4, 1930	36	6	
479	Harry Crapper	1930–1931	round 5, 1930	12	7	
480	Reg Conole	1930–1933	round 9, 1930	47	6	
481	Geoff Frood	1930	round 10, 1930	1	2	
482	Howard Steel	1930–1932	round 15, 1930	9	3	
483	Lew Gough	1930–1931	round 18, 1930	17	17	
484	Bert Avery	1931–1933	round 1, 1931	39	2	
485	Frank Smith	1931–1932	round 2, 1931	14	0	
486	Percy Beames	1931–1944	round 8, 1931	213	323	
487	Billy Collins	1931	round 11, 1931	2	0	
488	Gordon Lindsay	1931	round 11, 1931	1	0	
489	Bill Adams	1931–1932	round 16, 1931	16	12	
490	Dan Cunningham	1932	round 1, 1932	1	0	
491	Arch Dickens	1932	round 1, 1932	13	7	
492	Don Hooper	1932–1935, 1943	round 1, 1932	56	30	
493	Geoff McInnes	1932–1933	round 1, 1932	5	4	
494	Jack Richardson	1932	round 1, 1932	1	0	
495	Leo Nolan	1932	round 2, 1932	6	4	
496	Joe Kinnear	1932–1937	round 4, 1932	47	0	
497	Ike Sellers	1932	round 4, 1932	2	0	
498	Tom McMahon	1932	round 5, 1932	2	0	
499	Bill Earle	1932	round 6, 1932	9	0	
500	Joe Hogan	1932	round 6, 1932	1	0	
501	Ron Rutherford	1932	round 7, 1932	1	1	
502	Lou Riley	1932–1934	round 9, 1932	20	27	
503	Archie Roberts	1932–1936	round 9, 1932	36	0	
504	Alan Ryan	1932–1933	round 9, 1932	13	0	
505	Bill Deague	1932–1936	round 14, 1932	56	11	
506	Terry Ogden	1932	round 14, 1932	3	0	
507	Jack Pickford	1932	round 17, 1932	2	0	
508	Rowley Fischer	1933–1941	round 1, 1933	137	34	
509	Eric Glass	1933–1938	round 1, 1933	78	135	
510	Les Jones	1933–1941	round 1, 1933	121	88	
511	Colin Niven	1933–1935	round 1, 1933	44	13	
512	Jack Sambell	1933–1934	round 1, 1933	24	6	
513	Noel Barnett	1933	round 3, 1933	11	2	
514	Billy Libbis	1933–1935	round 4, 1933	39	25	
515	Charlie Longhurst	1933–1936	round 5, 1933	40	1	
516	Percy Streeter	1933	round 5, 1933	2	0	
517	Bill Robinson	1933	round 8, 1933	3	1	
518	Cliff Tyson	1933	round 8, 1933	2	1	
519	Jack Bennett	1933–1936	round 10, 1933	43	28	
520	Jack Harrison	1933, 1936	round 18, 1933	3	2	
521	Frank Kelly	1934–1936	round 1, 1934	31	1	
522	Allan La Fontaine	1934–1942, 1945	round 1, 1934	171	77	
523	Jack Mueller	1934–1950	round 1, 1934	216	378	
524	Bert Taylor	1934–1936	round 1, 1934	39	23	
525	Ron Wilson	1934	round 1, 1934	1	0	
526	Maurie Gibb	1934–1943	round 4, 1934	133	167	
527	Pat McNamara	1934–1938	round 4, 1934	54	0	
528	Sid Meehl	1934–1938	round 4, 1934	24	2	
529	Len Smith	1934–1935	round 5, 1934	19	3	
530	Jack Young	1934	round 9, 1934	20	0	
531	Ray Niven	1934	round 13, 1934	2	2	
532	Billy Walsh	1934	round 16, 1934	3	2	
533	Bill Sweeney	1934–1935	round 17, 1934	4	3	
534	Jock Ball	1935–1937	round 1, 1935	11	0	
535	Jack Foster	1935–1938	round 1, 1935	30	17	
536	Audley Gillespie-Jones	1935	round 1, 1935	2	0	
537	Gordon Jones	1935–1940	round 1, 1935	61	2	
538	Ray Wartman	1935–1942	round 1, 1935	125	61	
539	Fred Backway	1935, 1937	round 2, 1935	3	1	
540	Frank Halloran	1935	round 6, 1935	3	1	
541	Jack Carr	1935	round 8, 1935	2	0	
542	Ron Baggott	1935–1942, 1945	round 12, 1935	133	308	
543	Norm Smith	1935–1948	round 15, 1935	227	572	
544	Norm Matthews	1935, 1942–1944	round 16, 1935	15	1	
545	Ken Feltscheer	1935–1936	round 17, 1935	4	0	
546	Johnny Lewis	1936–1938	round 1, 1936	46	18	
547	Lou Reiffel	1936–1939	round 1, 1936	35	73	
548	Frank Roberts	1936–1941	round 1, 1936	86	5	
549	Jack Furniss	1936–1940, 1947	round 3, 1936	57	2	
550	Bill Ralston	1936	round 4, 1936	5	2	
551	Ron Barassi Sr.	1936–1940	round 7, 1936	58	84	
552	Wally Lock	1936–1941, 1946–1949	round 10, 1936	140	14	
553	Harden Dean	1936, 1938, 1943	round 10, 1936	4	0	
554	Hugh Murnane	1937–1940	round 1, 1937	52	42	
555	Richie Emselle	1937–1943	round 2, 1937	92	7	
556	Ted Buckley	1937–1939	round 5, 1937	38	3	
557	Keith Truscott	1937–1940, 1942	round 7, 1937	50	31	
558	Bert Chandler	1937	round 9, 1937	11	0	
559	Stan Penberthy	1937	round 9, 1937	11	0	
560	Jack Coolahan	1937	round 10, 1937	3	1	
561	Beres Reilly	1937	round 12, 1937	3	1	
562	Ted Regan	1938	round 1, 1938	4	0	
563	Len Catton	1938	round 3, 1938	2	0	
564	Dick Hingston	1938–1941, 1946	round 3, 1938	64	0	
565	Jack Maher	1938–1940, 1944	round 3, 1938	28	10	
566	Geoff McNaughton	1938	round 7, 1938	2	0	
567	Harry Harley	1938–1939	round 11, 1938	20	5	
568	Frank Williams	1938–1939, 1941	round 17, 1938	4	1	
569	Harold Ball	1939–1940	round 1, 1939	33	33	
570	Ian Giles	1939	round 1, 1939	6	0	
571	Bill Baxter	1939–1941	round 2, 1939	20	0	
572	Alby Rodda	1939–1943, 1946–1950	round 2, 1939	131	142	
573	Ron Kimberley	1939–1941, 1944	round 3, 1939	15	4	
574	Jack O'Keefe	1939–1942	round 5, 1939	46	27	
575	Syd Anderson	1939–1941	round 7, 1939	52	12	
576	Gerry Daly	1939–1941, 1946	round 10, 1939	19	2	
577	Les Gibbs	1939, 1941–1942, 1944	round 12, 1939	13	8	
578	Derek Symonds	1939	round 13, 1939	1	0	
579	Roy Dowsing	1939–1946	round 14, 1939	105	45	

=== 1940s ===
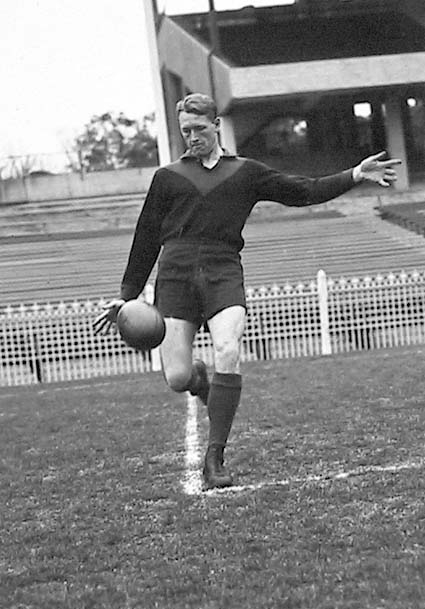
Melbourne Hall of Fame Legend, Brownlow Medallist and two-time premiership player, Don Cordner

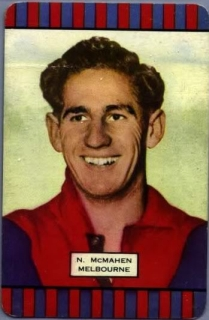
Team of the Century half-back, three-time premiership player and former captain, Noel McMahen

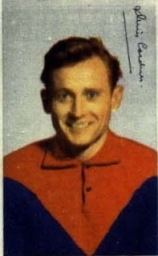
Team of the Century ruckman, three-time premiership player and former captain, Denis Cordner

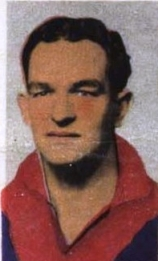
Two-time premiership player and former captain, Shane McGrath

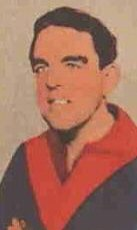
Fred Fanning holds the record for the most goals kicked in a match with 18 and he kicked 411 in total from 104 matches with Melbourne

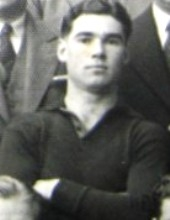
Three-time premiership player, Col McLean

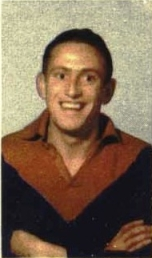
Two-time premiership player, Bob McKenzie

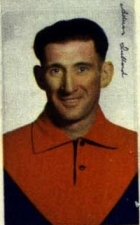
Two-time premiership player, Adrian Dullard

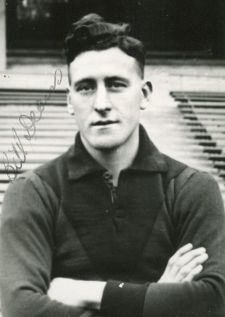
1948 premiership player, Billy Deans

Order	Name	Seasons	Debut	Games	Goals	Source
580	Fred Fanning	1940, 1942–1947	round 1, 1940	104	411	
581	Jack Atkins	1940	round 3, 1940	4	1	
582	Shane McGrath	1940–1941, 1944, 1946–1950	round 5, 1940	118	3	
583	Col McLean	1940–1941, 1944–1949	round 11, 1940	138	1	
584	Bernie Neenan	1940–1942	round 14, 1940	8	11	
585	Adrian Dullard	1940–1943, 1945–1949	round 17, 1940	116	143	
586	Noel Ellis	1940–1941	round 17, 1940	3	0	
587	George Archibald	1941–1945	round 4, 1941	47	5	
588	Mac Wilson	1941	round 4, 1941	5	2	
589	Ron White	1941, 1943	round 5, 1941	5	0	
590	George Lenne	1941–1942, 1945	round 7, 1941	24	3	
591	Ted Cordner	1941–1943, 1946	round 10, 1941	52	0	
592	Stan Heal	1941	round 10, 1941	8	5	
593	Warren Lewis	1941, 1944	round 15, 1941	8	3	
594	Hughie McPherson	1941–1944	round 17, 1941	37	14	
595	Don Cordner	1941–1950	semi final, 1941	166	23	
596	Frank Deayton	1942–1943	round 1, 1942	17	2	
597	Don Hewson	1942–1944	round 1, 1942	18	0	
598	Ray Shearer	1942	round 1, 1942	2	0	
599	Darcy Walsh	1942–1944	round 1, 1942	18	0	
600	Bob Spargo	1942	round 2, 1942	2	0	
601	Tom Bush	1942, 1944	round 3, 1942	5	2	
602	Tom Ferguson	1942–1943	round 3, 1942	14	8	
603	Arthur Franklin	1942	round 3, 1942	3	2	
604	Bryan Martin	1942–1943	round 3, 1942	5	0	
605	Danny Powell	1942	round 3, 1942	7	6	
606	Gordon Kramer	1942, 1944–1945	round 6, 1942	23	2	
607	Bob Stone	1942–1943, 1949	round 7, 1942	8	0	
608	Jim McDonald	1942	round 8, 1942	1	0	
609	Jack Heal	1942	round 10, 1942	3	1	
610	Ted Wood	1942	round 10, 1942	2	0	
611	Colin Bradley	1942–1944	round 12, 1942	16	0	
612	Billy Deans	1942–1950	round 13, 1942	151	20	
613	Jack Minnis	1942–1944	round 14, 1942	25	6	
614	Clyde Helmer	1942	round 15, 1942	2	3	
615	Ron Hobba	1943	round 1, 1943	8	0	
616	Keith Molloy	1943, 1945	round 1, 1943	12	0	
617	Bob Herbert	1943–1944	round 2, 1943	27	38	
618	Denis Cordner	1943, 1948–1956	round 5, 1943	152	82	
619	Ernie Hart	1943	round 5, 1943	1	0	
620	Ken Levey	1943–1944	round 5, 1943	17	0	
621	Frank Scanlan	1943–1944, 1947–1948	round 5, 1943	33	13	
622	Johnny Dalton	1943	round 6, 1943	2	2	
623	Jack Doherty	1943–1944	round 6, 1943	9	0	
624	Doug Heywood	1943–1944, 1948–1951	round 8, 1943	54	30	
625	Charlie Newman	1943–1945	round 9, 1943	15	0	
626	Ron Irwin	1943–1947	round 13, 1943	51	0	
627	Ron Marshall	1943	round 13, 1943	2	0	
628	Ralph Shalless	1943, 1946	round 14, 1943	4	3	
629	Ken Shadbolt	1943	round 15, 1943	2	0	
630	Bill Scanlan	1943–1948	round 16, 1943	51	22	
631	Clem Conroy	1944–1946	round 1, 1944	12	1	
632	Col Galbraith	1944	round 1, 1944	4	0	
633	Frank Kennedy	1944–1947	round 1, 1944	36	11	
634	Frank McGrath	1944	round 1, 1944	2	1	
635	Percy Taylor	1944–1945	round 1, 1944	9	20	
636	Es Downey	1944–1945	round 3, 1944	22	7	
637	Lloyd Bennett	1944	round 5, 1944	9	4	
638	Jack Stock	1944–1945	round 6, 1944	14	0	
639	Jack Compton	1944	round 7, 1944	3	2	
640	Tony Bizzaca	1944	round 10, 1944	2	1	
641	Ivan Porter	1944–1946	round 10, 1944	25	31	
642	Bryan Crimmins	1944	round 12, 1944	1	0	
643	Ron Hall	1944–1947	round 13, 1944	17	2	
644	Neil Bencraft	1944	round 14, 1944	2	3	
645	Jim Ryan	1944	round 16, 1944	1	0	
646	Harry New	1944–1945	round 18, 1944	2	0	
647	Ralph Latham	1945	round 3, 1945	16	11	
648	Norm Leverton	1945	round 3, 1945	2	0	
649	Roy Stabb	1945–1947	round 3, 1945	29	2	
650	George Bickford	1945–1952	round 5, 1945	126	17	
651	Gordon Bowman	1945–1950	round 5, 1945	53	9	
652	Dick Kennedy	1945–1946	round 5, 1945	13	11	
653	Ernie O'Rourke	1945–1948	round 6, 1945	39	46	
654	Norm Wilson	1945–1946	round 6, 1945	10	13	
655	Jim Oppy	1945	round 7, 1945	3	0	
656	Ern Rowarth	1945–1947	round 7, 1945	20	3	
657	Frank Hughes Jr.	1945	round 8, 1945	8	0	
658	Jack Mitchell	1945	round 12, 1945	6	9	
659	Bruce Edge	1945	round 15, 1945	3	0	
660	Harry Rowe	1945–1946	round 20, 1945	2	0	
661	Jack Quinn	1946	round 1, 1946	6	5	
662	Stan Rule	1946–1950	round 3, 1946	74	13	
663	Lance Arnold	1946–1954	round 4, 1946	149	88	
664	Arnold Byfield	1946	round 4, 1946	18	10	
665	Len Dockett	1946–1951	round 4, 1946	102	47	
666	Alf Copsey	1946	round 8, 1946	5	0	
667	Noel McMahen	1946–1956	round 8, 1946	175	28	
668	Des Bell	1946–1948	round 9, 1946	7	4	
669	Jim Mitchell	1946–1948	round 10, 1946	42	33	
670	Frank O'Connor	1947–1948	round 1, 1947	24	29	
671	Frank Hanna	1947–1949	round 2, 1947	30	3	
672	Edward Jackson	1947–1952	round 3, 1947	84	10	
673	Dave Newman	1947	round 8, 1947	4	1	
674	Russ Robinson	1947–1948	round 8, 1947	7	1	
675	Eddie Craddock	1947–1950	round 14, 1947	30	45	
676	Max Spittle	1947–1950	round 14, 1947	50	1	
677	Dave Hardie	1947–1948	round 18, 1947	7	3	
678	Bob McKenzie	1948–1955	round 1, 1948	125	254	
679	Eric Roscoe	1948–1949	round 1, 1948	17	11	
680	Geoff Collins	1948–1952, 1954	round 4, 1948	88	5	
681	Greg Lourey	1948, 1950	round 10, 1948	7	1	
682	Colin Cox	1948–1949	round 13, 1948	3	2	
683	Les Crawley	1948	round 17, 1948	4	0	
684	Alan McGowan	1948–1950	round 18, 1948	22	7	
685	Ken Rollason	1949–1950	round 2, 1949	11	13	
686	Ken Carlon	1949–1950	round 3, 1949	30	6	
687	Mike Woods	1949–1953	round 3, 1949	72	6	
688	Raymond Jones	1949	round 5, 1949	1	0	
689	Jack Dorgan	1949	round 6, 1949	3	0	
690	Jim Shaw	1949	round 6, 1949	3	2	
691	Len Toyne	1949	round 7, 1949	12	18	
692	Bob Chadwick	1949	round 13, 1949	2	0	
693	Colin Love	1949–1952	round 16, 1949	16	13	
694	Ray Harvey	1949	round 17, 1949	2	3	
695	Jack Thomson	1949–1953	round 17, 1949	64	46	

=== 1950s ===
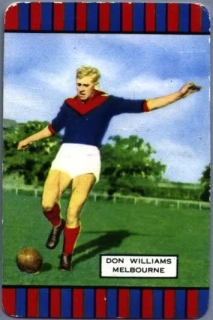
Melbourne Team of the Century half-back and five-time premiership player, Don Williams

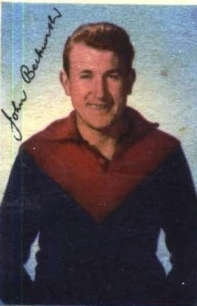
Former captain, Melbourne Team of the Century back pocket and five-time premiership player, John Beckwith

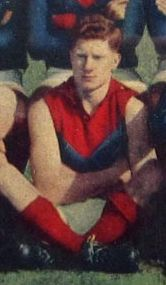
Melbourne Team of the Century member and six-time premiership player, Frank 'Bluey' Adams

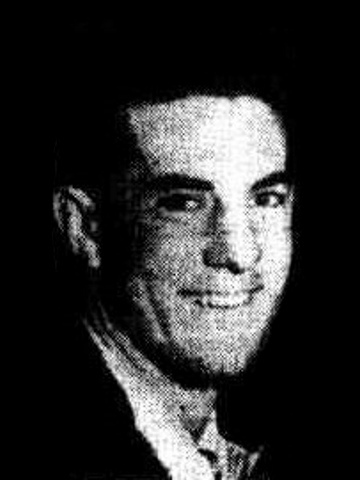
Melbourne Team of the Century member and five-time premiership player, Laurie Mithen

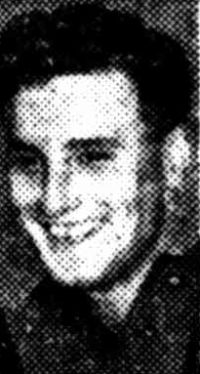
Three-time premiership player, Ian McLean

Order	Name	Seasons	Debut	Games	Goals	Source
696	Geoff McGivern	1950–1956	round 1, 1950	105	53	
697	Stuart Spencer	1950–1956	round 1, 1950	122	146	
698	Dave Bedford	1950	round 2, 1950	4	0	
699	Jack Hiscock	1950	round 3, 1950	4	3	
700	Con O'Toole	1950	round 4, 1950	4	0	
701	Max Jeffers	1950	round 6, 1950	6	5	
702	Arthur Pound	1950	round 8, 1950	7	12	
703	Bob Johnston	1950–1952	round 11, 1950	30	0	
704	Nevin Paynter	1950–1951, 1953	round 14, 1950	12	0	
705	Ray Hutchins	1950–1951	round 17, 1950	5	0	
706	John Beckwith	1951–1960	round 1, 1951	176	19	
707	Ken Christie	1951–1955	round 1, 1951	70	9	
708	Alan Daly	1951	round 1, 1951	7	3	
709	Ian McLean	1951–1960	round 1, 1951	146	29	
710	Bob Rowse	1951	round 1, 1951	6	0	
711	Bill Smeaton	1951–1952	round 1, 1951	17	33	
712	Terry Peirce	1951–1952	round 2, 1951	3	0	
713	Keith Robinson	1951, 1954	round 2, 1951	20	0	
714	Tom McLean	1951–1952	round 3, 1951	22	2	
715	John Ferguson	1951–1954	round 4, 1951	15	6	
716	George O'Keeffe	1951–1952	round 4, 1951	13	1	
717	Alan Krause	1951–1953	round 5, 1951	12	8	
718	Noel Clarke	1951–1955	round 6, 1951	77	155	
719	John Cordner	1951	round 6, 1951	6	0	
720	Ron McMahon	1951–1952	round 9, 1951	13	1	
721	Ralph Lane	1951–1956	round 10, 1951	72	9	
722	Ken McKaige	1951–1952	round 11, 1951	9	1	
723	Kevin Webb	1951	round 12, 1951	4	4	
724	Geoff Mason	1951	round 14, 1951	4	0	
725	Ken Albiston	1952–1954	round 1, 1952	45	49	
726	Ian Toyne	1952	round 1, 1952	1	0	
727	Harry Lack	1952	round 3, 1952	3	0	
728	Max Orr	1952–1953	round 3, 1952	7	4	
729	Jim Wilson	1952–1953	round 5, 1952	17	16	
730	Neil Whitaker	1952–1953	round 10, 1952	10	1	
731	Maurie Lehmann	1952	round 13, 1952	6	1	
732	Keith Carroll	1952–1958	round 19, 1952	58	0	
733	Dale Anderson	1953–1954	round 1, 1953	7	15	
734	Leigh Gloury	1953–1954	round 1, 1953	12	1	
735	Peter Marquis	1953–1958	round 1, 1953	99	7	
736	Ken Melville	1953–1956	round 1, 1953	71	1	
737	Don Cameron	1953	round 2, 1953	2	1	
738	Bill Morrow	1953	round 2, 1953	6	4	
739	Maurie Reeves	1953	round 2, 1953	10	4	
740	Don Williams	1953–1959, 1964–1968	round 3, 1953	205	5	
741	Ron Barassi Jr.	1953–1964	round 4, 1953	204	295	
742	Noel Baker	1953, 1955	round 5, 1953	8	0	
743	Geoff Case	1953–1962	round 5, 1953	123	34	
744	Terry Gleeson	1953–1962	round 10, 1953	100	27	
745	Peter Schofield	1953	round 10, 1953	6	14	
746	Bob Constable	1953	round 11, 1953	3	1	
747	Ron McKenzie	1953	round 12, 1953	1	0	
748	Tony Bull	1953–1957	round 13, 1953	31	10	
749	Frank Adams	1953–1964	round 14, 1953	164	180	
750	Laurie Mithen	1954–1962	round 1, 1954	153	108	
751	Clyde Laidlaw	1954–1962	round 2, 1954	124	58	
752	Tom Magee	1954	round 3, 1954	1	1	
753	Colin Wilson	1954–1959	round 4, 1954	63	1	
754	Brian Dixon	1954–1968	round 5, 1954	252	41	
755	Ian Ridley	1954–1961	round 10, 1954	130	228	
756	Bob Johnson	1954–1961	round 11, 1954	140	267	
757	Kevin Clarke	1955	round 1, 1955	1	0	
758	Fred Webster	1955	round 2, 1955	3	2	
759	Trevor Johnson	1955–1962	round 3, 1955	118	9	
760	Dick Atkinson	1955, 1957	round 6, 1955	7	0	
761	Ivan Baumgartner	1955	round 6, 1955	5	0	
762	Athol Webb	1955–1959	round 12, 1955	74	146	
763	Peter Cook	1956–1958	round 4, 1956	14	6	
764	Jim Sandral	1956–1957	round 4, 1956	22	2	
765	Dennis Jones	1956–1960, 1962	round 11, 1956	59	4	
766	Bill Byrne	1957	round 1, 1957	1	0	
767	John Lord	1957–1965	round 1, 1957	132	80	
768	Geoff Tunbridge	1957–1962	round 1, 1957	117	129	
769	Peter Brenchley	1957–1959	round 2, 1957	29	14	
770	Ben Crameri	1957–1958	round 2, 1957	3	0	
771	Dick Fenton-Smith	1957–1959	round 2, 1957	50	21	
772	Graeme Pinfold	1957–1961	round 2, 1957	20	4	
773	Ian Thorogood	1957–1962	round 3, 1957	93	1	
774	Graham Kerr	1957	round 5, 1957	3	0	
775	Brian Dunsford	1957	round 6, 1957	7	1	
776	Neil Crompton	1957–1960, 1962–1966	round 7, 1957	99	24	
777	Bob Turner	1957–1958, 1960–1961	round 11, 1957	22	7	
778	Terry Mountain	1957	round 14, 1957	3	1	
779	Kevin Mithen	1957–1958	round 17, 1957	4	0	
780	Alan Rowarth	1958–1963	round 3, 1958	70	90	
781	Graeme Wilkinson	1958	round 5, 1958	1	0	
782	John Kerr	1958	round 15, 1958	1	2	
783	Tassie Johnson	1959–1969	round 1, 1959	202	20	
784	Hassa Mann	1959–1968	round 1, 1959	178	193	
785	Bryan Kenneally	1959–1969	round 11, 1959	171	68	

=== 1960s ===
Order	Name	Seasons	Debut	Games	Goals	Source
786	Brian Leahy	1960–1965	round 1, 1960	79	2	
787	Bernie Massey	1960–1967	round 1, 1960	99	0	
788	George Milner	1960–1961	round 1, 1960	15	1	
789	Len Mann	1960–1964	round 2, 1960	46	5	
790	Ray Nilsson	1960–1963	round 8, 1960	41	44	
791	Peter Baker	1960	round 12, 1960	1	0	
792	Ray Dawson	1961–1963	round 1, 1961	35	19	
793	Bob Miller	1961–1965	round 3, 1961	69	3	
794	Brian Roet	1961–1965, 1968	round 4, 1961	88	1	
795	Bob Carroll	1961–1964	round 5, 1961	14	7	
796	Bruce Leslie	1961	round 7, 1961	6	1	
797	John Leahy	1961	round 12, 1961	2	0	
798	Herbie Matthews	1961–1964	round 13, 1961	20	8	
799	Mike Collins	1961–1964	round 18, 1961	4	1	
800	Barrie Vagg	1962–1969	round 1, 1962	115	132	
801	Kerry Rattray	1962–1963, 1965–1966	round 3, 1962	23	12	
802	Jim Jenkinson	1962–1963	round 6, 1962	3	3	
803	Alec Ingwersen	1962	round 7, 1962	2	0	
804	Ken Emselle	1962–1967, 1969	round 9, 1962	97	109	
805	John Townsend	1962–1972	round 11, 1962	153	183	
806	Garry Byers	1962–1963	round 16, 1962	5	2	
807	Ray Groom	1963–1968	round 1, 1963	92	36	
808	Graham Wise	1963–1966	round 1, 1963	40	1	
809	Barry Bourke	1963–1966, 1968–1973	round 2, 1963	175	154	
810	Tony Anderson	1963–1969	round 4, 1963	75	2	
811	Tony Thiessen	1963	round 4, 1963	7	2	
812	Owen Zinko	1963–1964	round 5, 1963	3	3	
813	David Robbie	1963–1965	round 10, 1963	21	5	
814	Graeme Watson	1964–1965	round 3, 1964	18	3	
815	Graeme Jacobs	1964–1967	round 4, 1964	36	49	
816	Rob Foster	1964–1967	round 5, 1964	22	7	
817	Maurie Bartlett	1964, 1966	round 6, 1964	7	7	
818	Peter McLean	1964–1965	round 8, 1964	28	2	
819	Frank Davis	1964–1973	round 13, 1964	168	2	
820	Jim Leitch	1964–1965	round 15, 1964	12	7	
821	Hugh Bromell	1965	round 1, 1965	13	4	
822	Ken Rowe	1965–1966	round 5, 1965	17	0	
823	Stan Alves	1965–1976	round 7, 1965	226	174	
824	Robin Andrew	1965	round 7, 1965	1	1	
825	Frank Vearing	1965–1966	round 11, 1965	11	5	
826	Rick Feldmann	1965–1967	round 18, 1965	10	2	
827	Bob Gormly	1965	round 18, 1965	1	0	
828	Ed Burston	1966	round 1, 1966	8	13	
829	Jeff Chapman	1966	round 1, 1966	2	2	
830	Ross Dillon	1966–1972	round 1, 1966	85	133	
831	Terry Leahy	1966–1967	round 1, 1966	26	8	
832	Bob Russell	1966	round 1, 1966	2	0	
833	Bob Stewart	1966–1967	round 1, 1966	17	0	
834	Neville Stone	1966–1969	round 1, 1966	35	19	
835	Adrian Bowden	1966–1967	round 3, 1966	24	0	
836	Les Harrison	1966	round 3, 1966	3	1	
837	Peter Smith	1966–1967	round 3, 1966	23	23	
838	Brent Jones	1966–1971	round 4, 1966	45	5	
839	Garrey Wynd	1966	round 6, 1966	2	1	
840	Ken Jungwirth	1966	round 7, 1966	4	5	
841	Rob Dowsing	1966–1968	round 8, 1966	16	17	
842	John Hamilton	1966	round 8, 1966	2	0	
843	John Quirk	1966	round 8, 1966	3	2	
844	Tony Hirst	1966	round 11, 1966	2	0	
845	John Murnane	1966–1967	round 11, 1966	7	0	
846	Kerry Ryan	1966	round 11, 1966	1	1	
847	Graham Osborne	1966–1977	round 12, 1966	146	61	
848	Sid Catlin	1966–1968	round 14, 1966	4	1	
849	Bob Langford	1966–1967	round 17, 1966	3	1	
850	Ken Osborne	1966–1968	round 17, 1966	13	7	
851	Chris Aitken	1967, 1969, 1977	round 1, 1967	14	15	
852	Chris Fowler	1967–1969	round 1, 1967	23	3	
853	Ted Lees	1967–1968	round 1, 1967	8	8	
854	John Toll	1967	round 2, 1967	2	0	
855	Geoff Whitton	1967–1968	round 2, 1967	8	0	
856	Gary Hardeman	1967–1977, 1981	round 3, 1967	219	113	
857	John Comben	1967	round 4, 1967	1	0	
858	Derek Feldmann	1967–1970	round 7, 1967	41	3	
859	Tom Quinn	1967	round 8, 1967	5	0	
860	Max Walker	1967–1972	round 12, 1967	85	23	
861	Tony Sullivan	1967–1979	round 13, 1967	191	1	
862	Kelvin Clarke	1968–1970	round 1, 1968	9	9	
863	John Forster	1968–1970	round 1, 1968	9	0	
864	Greg Parke	1968–1973	round 2, 1968	119	169	
865	Denis Clark	1968–1975	round 5, 1968	113	49	
866	Phil Rhoden	1968–1969	round 7, 1968	3	0	
867	Darryl Schwarz	1968–1969	round 9, 1968	12	0	
868	Ray Biffin	1968–1979	round 12, 1968	170	131	
869	George Lakes	1968–1972	round 12, 1968	49	20	
870	Euan Campbell	1968	round 16, 1968	1	0	
871	Peter Weekes	1968–1971	round 17, 1968	23	9	
872	Graeme Aubrey	1968	round 20, 1968	1	2	
873	David Hone	1969	round 1, 1969	18	3	
874	John Letcher	1969–1970, 1972	round 1, 1969	25	2	
875	Trevor Rollinson	1969–1973	round 1, 1969	49	1	
876	Paul Rowlands	1969–1970	round 2, 1969	35	0	
877	Blair Campbell	1969	round 4, 1969	12	23	
878	David Hayes	1969	round 6, 1969	1	0	
879	Peter Sinclair	1969–1972	round 8, 1969	34	18	
880	Russell Colcott	1969–1971	round 10, 1969	15	18	
881	Mark Mitchell	1969	round 10, 1969	6	2	
882	Steve Arnott	1969	round 11, 1969	1	0	
883	Robert McKenzie	1969–1972	round 14, 1969	42	21	
884	Danny Jennings	1969–1970	round 17, 1969	9	3	
885	Greg Wells	1969–1980	round 18, 1969	224	251	
886	Daryl Powell	1969	round 19, 1969	2	0	
887	Ray Sampson	1969	round 19, 1969	1	0	

=== 1970s ===
Order	Name	Seasons	Debut	Games	Goals	Source
888	Ray Carr	1970–1972	round 1, 1970	25	55	
889	Peter Keenan	1970–1975, 1981–1982	round 1, 1970	131	88	
890	Terry Davey	1970	round 3, 1970	1	0	
891	Paul Callery	1970–1973	round 4, 1970	76	102	
892	Noel Leary	1970–1973	round 4, 1970	19	0	
893	Des Campbell	1970, 1975–1977	round 5, 1970	50	13	
894	Graham Molloy	1970–1975	round 6, 1970	67	35	
895	Rod Payne	1970	round 8, 1970	13	6	
896	Lloyd Burgmann	1970–1972	round 12, 1970	30	41	
897	Barry Hodges	1970–1971	round 19, 1970	7	1	
898	John Gallus	1971–1972	round 1, 1971	28	39	
899	Bruce Brown	1971	round 2, 1971	6	0	
900	Gordon Lawrie	1971	round 9, 1971	6	0	
901	Shane McSpeerin	1971–1973	round 10, 1971	16	11	
902	Mike Collins	1971–1974	round 12, 1971	27	11	
903	John Tilbrook	1971–1975	round 12, 1971	53	59	
904	Henry Ritterman	1971–1973	round 19, 1971	23	10	
905	Peter Williamson	1971–1974	round 21, 1971	27	16	
906	Stephen Kerley	1971–1974	round 22, 1971	43	3	
907	Ross Brewer	1972–1978	round 1, 1972	121	196	
908	John Clennett	1972–1974	round 2, 1972	39	22	
909	Peter Dilnot	1972–1973	round 9, 1972	5	3	
910	Col Anderson	1972	round 10, 1972	2	0	
911	Geoff Harrold	1972	round 15, 1972	2	0	
912	Laurie Queay	1972	round 16, 1972	2	2	
913	Wayne Delmenico	1972–1975	round 17, 1972	31	1	
914	Peter Yeo	1972	round 19, 1972	3	1	
915	John Reid	1972, 1974	round 22, 1972	3	0	
916	Carl Ditterich	1973–1975, 1979–1980	round 1, 1973	82	43	
917	Frank Giampaolo	1973–1977	round 1, 1973	53	31	
918	Mal Owens	1973–1975	round 1, 1973	16	3	
919	Glenn Swan	1973	round 1, 1973	13	21	
920	John Cumming	1973	round 2, 1973	4	0	
921	Shane Fitzsimmons	1973–1979	round 2, 1973	63	33	
922	John Morgan	1973	round 4, 1973	4	0	
923	Ian McGuinness	1973	round 9, 1973	2	0	
924	Robert Flower	1973–1987	round 10, 1973	272	315	
925	Anthony Dullard	1973–1981	round 19, 1973	108	49	
926	Greg MacDonald	1973	round 19, 1973	4	6	
927	Neil Chamberlain	1973–1976	round 20, 1973	17	10	
928	Garry Baker	1974–1981	round 1, 1974	127	112	
929	Kevin Moore	1974	round 1, 1974	8	1	
930	Dennis Payne	1974	round 2, 1974	1	0	
931	Peter Slade	1974	round 2, 1974	15	4	
932	David Murray	1974	round 3, 1974	6	0	
933	Steven Smith	1974–1985	round 3, 1974	203	144	
934	Neil McMullin	1974	round 7, 1974	7	1	
935	Peter Keays	1974–1977	round 8, 1974	40	4	
936	Charlie Pagnoccolo	1974	round 8, 1974	1	0	
937	Billy Barham	1974–1975	round 9, 1974	12	15	
938	Greg Wood	1974	round 9, 1974	11	4	
939	Graham Scott	1974	round 13, 1974	8	4	
940	Ted Carroll	1974–1977	round 17, 1974	31	12	
941	Mike Power	1974	round 21, 1974	2	0	
942	Laurie Fowler	1975–1981	round 1, 1975	140	18	
943	Gary Guy	1975–1976	round 1, 1975	22	8	
944	Paul Hurst	1975–1977	round 1, 1975	19	6	
945	Marty Lyons	1975–1977	round 1, 1975	27	16	
946	Kim Smith	1975	round 1, 1975	4	3	
947	John Sparks	1975, 1977	round 5, 1975	9	8	
948	Terry Wilkins	1975–1976	round 5, 1975	34	3	
949	Henry Coles	1975–1980	round 12, 1975	77	106	
950	David Kelly	1975–1976	round 12, 1975	3	0	
951	Ray Smith	1975–1976	round 13, 1975	27	1	
952	Colin Graham	1975–1978	round 15, 1975	35	32	
953	Barry Ough	1975	round 15, 1975	1	0	
954	Greg Hutchison	1975–1984	round 22, 1975	96	21	
955	Glenn Walley	1975–1976	round 22, 1975	3	2	
956	Allan Davis	1976–1977	round 1, 1976	41	36	
957	Shane Grambeau	1976–1979	round 1, 1976	60	8	
958	Craig McKellar	1976–1978	round 1, 1976	39	19	
959	Paul Goss	1976	round 2, 1976	4	2	
960	Peter Johnston	1976–1978	round 4, 1976	30	36	
961	Maurice Wingate	1976–1980	round 4, 1976	39	13	
962	Barry Tippett	1976–1978	round 9, 1976	18	9	
963	Peter Hamilton	1976–1983	round 13, 1976	52	1	
964	Peter O'Keefe	1976–1979	round 16, 1976	10	1	
965	Chris Woodman	1976–1980	round 16, 1976	32	31	
966	Barry Denny	1977–1979	round 1, 1977	22	3	
967	Andrew Moir	1977–1981	round 1, 1977	73	68	
968	Tom Flower	1977–1979	round 6, 1977	26	28	
969	Daryl Cumming	1977	round 7, 1977	10	7	
970	Brian Cook	1977	round 11, 1977	4	0	
971	Robert Walters	1977–1981	round 12, 1977	25	46	
972	Barry Norsworthy	1977–1979	round 13, 1977	21	18	
973	Mark Alves	1977	round 16, 1977	4	1	
974	Brett Marchant	1977	round 16, 1977	4	0	
975	Michael Byrne	1977–1982	round 20, 1977	56	41	
976	Phil Seaton	1978–1980	round 1, 1978	19	5	
977	Ken Whitfort	1978–1979	round 1, 1978	12	8	
978	Peter Thorne	1978–1979, 1984	round 2, 1978	26	35	
979	Tony May	1978	round 3, 1978	2	1	
980	Kelvin Richards	1978–1979	round 3, 1978	5	0	
981	Graham Gaunt	1978–1982	round 4, 1978	69	32	
982	Peter Garratt	1978	round 5, 1978	1	0	
983	David Code	1978	round 6, 1978	6	1	
984	Graham Hunnibell	1978–1980	round 7, 1978	12	2	
985	Ken Roberts	1978–1979	round 10, 1978	12	16	
986	Paul Thompson	1978	round 12, 1978	6	0	
987	Mark McKeon	1978	round 14, 1978	6	0	
988	Gary Cooke	1978	round 15, 1978	7	3	
989	Mick Rea	1978	round 16, 1978	3	1	
990	Des O'Dwyer	1978–1982	round 17, 1978	8	5	
991	Phil Carman	1979	round 1, 1979	11	23	
992	Glenn Elliott	1979	round 1, 1979	15	11	
993	Gerard Healy	1979–1985	round 1, 1979	130	189	
994	Tony Martyn	1979–1981	round 1, 1979	32	5	
995	Robert Elliott	1979–1981	round 2, 1979	43	8	
996	Kelly O'Donnell	1979–1981	round 3, 1979	80	67	
997	John Wallace	1979	round 3, 1979	2	0	
998	John Dellamarta	1979	round 4, 1979	2	1	
999	Don Whitford	1979–1981	round 4, 1979	10	3	
1000	Bruce Elliott	1979–1980	round 5, 1979	5	0	
1001	Stewart Gull	1979	round 7, 1979	2	1	
1002	Cameron Clayton	1979–1982	round 8, 1979	44	18	
1003	Wayne Gordon	1979–1981	round 8, 1979	34	5	
1004	Peter Giles	1979–1987	round 9, 1979	124	32	
1005	Jim Durnan	1979–1981	round 12, 1979	26	2	
1006	Tony Elshaug	1979–1983	round 21, 1979	66	92	

=== 1980s ===
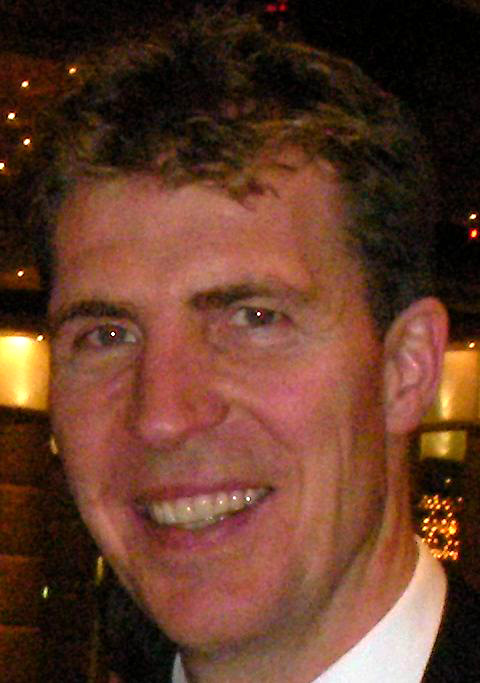
Australian Football and Melbourne Hall of Fame member and Brownlow Medallist, Jim Stynes

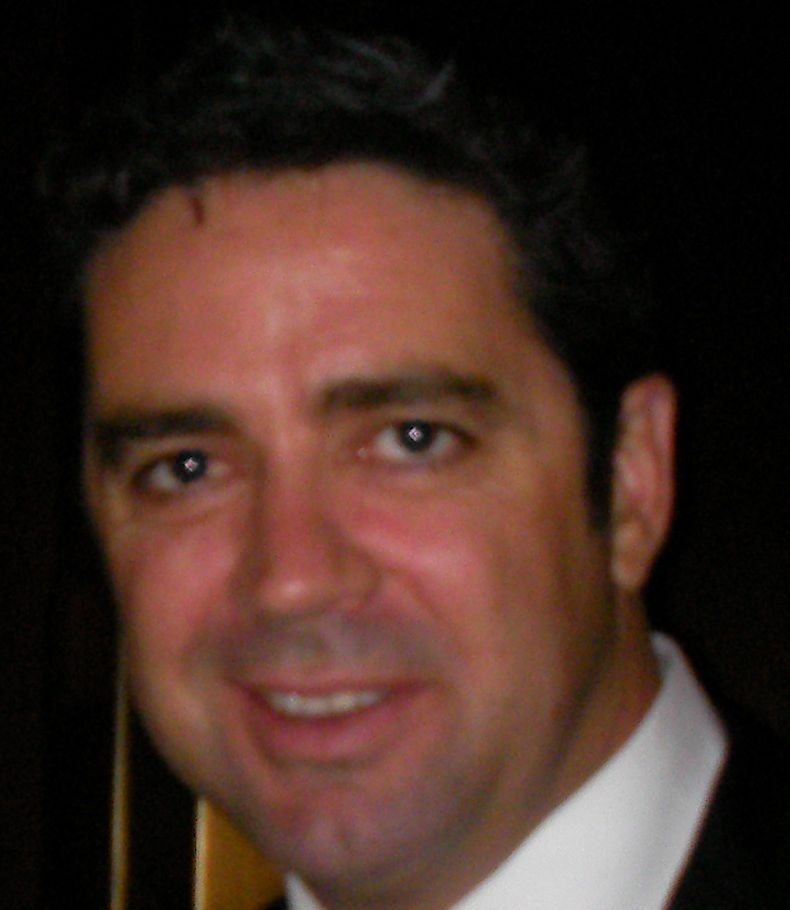
Former captain, Garry Lyon played 226 matches for Melbourne from 1986 to 1999

Order	Name	Seasons	Debut	Games	Goals	Source
1007	Tony Barnes	1980–1981	round 1, 1980	7	6	
1008	Stephen Bickford	1980–1981	round 1, 1980	15	4	
1009	Bill Nettlefold	1980–1982	round 1, 1980	34	14	
1010	Russell Rowe	1980	round 1, 1980	11	15	
1011	Michael Seddon	1980–1985	round 1, 1980	57	24	
1012	Brent Crosswell	1980–1982	round 4, 1980	48	57	
1013	Phillip Pinnell	1980–1981	round 5, 1980	28	10	
1014	Glenn McLean	1980–1984	round 7, 1980	42	8	
1015	Peter Maynard	1980–1981	round 17, 1980	8	1	
1016	Paul O'Brien	1980–1983	round 20, 1980	22	0	
1017	Mark Jackson	1981–1982	round 1, 1981	41	152	
1018	Michael Young	1981–1983	round 1, 1981	15	3	
1019	Vin Catoggio	1981–1982	round 3, 1981	9	15	
1020	Shane Zantuck	1981–1986	round 3, 1981	88	13	
1021	Dave McGlashan	1981–1982	round 4, 1981	6	7	
1022	Roger Ellingworth	1981–1984	round 6, 1981	41	20	
1023	Jamie Barham	1981	round 8, 1981	4	1	
1024	Russell Dickson	1981	round 11, 1981	4	1	
1025	Glenn Giles	1981	round 14, 1981	2	0	
1026	Ian Todd	1981	round 16, 1981	6	1	
1027	Trevor Korn	1981	round 18, 1981	3	1	
1028	Shane Braddy	1981	round 19, 1981	2	3	
1029	John Tossol	1981–1982	round 21, 1981	2	3	
1030	Adrian Battiston	1982–1987	round 1, 1982	96	75	
1031	David Cordner	1982–1987	round 1, 1982	53	61	
1032	Steven Icke	1982–1987	round 1, 1982	78	17	
1033	Alan Jarrott	1982–1987	round 1, 1982	91	26	
1034	Alan Johnson	1982–1990	round 1, 1982	135	95	
1035	Michael O'Sullivan	1982–1986	round 1, 1982	53	11	
1036	Brian Wilson	1982–1990	round 1, 1982	154	208	
1037	Dale Dickson	1982–1986	round 4, 1982	56	20	
1038	Peter Tossol	1982–1984	round 6, 1982	17	20	
1039	Stephen McCarthy	1982–1983	round 7, 1982	12	9	
1040	Chris Connolly	1982–1990	round 13, 1982	84	38	
1041	Ted Fidge	1982–1988	round 13, 1982	42	61	
1042	Stuart McKenzie	1982	round 13, 1982	9	0	
1043	Scott Sutcliffe	1982–1985	round 19, 1982	7	2	
1044	Les Bamblett	1983	round 1, 1983	11	12	
1045	Peter Moore	1983–1987	round 1, 1983	77	51	
1046	Russell Richards	1983–1987	round 1, 1983	81	43	
1047	Kelvin Templeton	1983–1985	round 1, 1983	34	99	
1048	David Williams	1983–1984, 1986–1988	round 1, 1983	67	102	
1049	Rodney Wright	1983–1986	round 1, 1983	32	6	
1050	Glenn Boland	1982–1984	round 8, 1983	16	1	
1051	Trevor Castles	1982–1984	round 15, 1983	1	0	
1052	Michael Reynolds	1983–1986	round 15, 1983	22	20	
1053	Frank Rugolo	1983–1986	round 21, 1983	11	11	
1054	Ray Holden	1984	round 1, 1984	3	1	
1055	Danny Hughes	1984–1990	round 1, 1984	124	23	
1056	Xavier Tanner	1984–1985	round 2, 1984	11	5	
1057	John Fidge	1984–1986	round 4, 1984	32	34	
1058	Mark Withers	1984–1986	round 4, 1984	32	28	
1059	Bret Bailey	1982–1989	round 6, 1984	80	39	
1060	Darryl Cox	1984–1986	round 6, 1984	13	7	
1061	Greg Healy	1984–1993	round 6, 1984	141	167	
1062	Graeme Yeats	1984–1995	round 8, 1984	182	45	
1063	Ross Fisher	1984	round 21, 1984	1	0	
1064	Michael Howard	1983–1986	round 21, 1984	2	0	
1065	Paul Earley	1984	round 22, 1984	1	1	
1066	Robin White	1985–1987	round 1, 1985	30	2	
1067	Rod Grinter	1985–1995	round 2, 1985	134	57	
1068	Paul Payne	1985–1988	round 3, 1985	28	5	
1069	Joe Rugolo	1985–1987	round 3, 1985	8	0	
1070	Stephen Newport	1985–1990	round 5, 1985	101	58	
1071	Daryl Bourke	1985–1986	round 8, 1985	18	0	
1072	Sean Wight	1984–1995	round 8, 1985	150	63	
1073	Darren Louttit	1985–1986	round 10, 1985	13	1	
1074	David Allday	1985–1986	round 11, 1985	15	4	
1075	Nigel Kol	1984–1987	round 13, 1985	28	13	
1076	Les Parish	1985	round 13, 1985	7	5	
1077	Bret Hutchinson	1985	round 15, 1985	1	0	
1078	Garry Lyon	1986–1999	round 1, 1986	226	426	
1079	Steven Stretch	1986–1993	round 1, 1986	164	71	
1080	Steve Turner	1986–1987	round 1, 1986	32	10	
1081	Tony Campbell	1986–1991	round 2, 1986	75	61	
1082	Simon Eishold	1986–1992	round 4, 1986	77	50	
1083	Jeremy Nichols	1985–1986	round 8, 1986	4	2	
1084	Brett Lovett	1986–1997	round 14, 1986	235	48	
1085	Andrew Dale	1986	round 16, 1986	2	0	
1086	Ricky Jackson	1986–1991	round 16, 1986	80	131	
1087	Len Gandini	1986	round 18, 1986	5	1	
1088	Greg Sizer	1986–1987	round 22, 1986	1	1	
1089	Warren Dean	1987–1989	round 1, 1987	32	25	
1090	Earl Spalding	1987–1991	round 1, 1987	109	63	
1091	Todd Viney	1987–1999	round 1, 1987	233	92	
1092	Doug Koop	1987–1989	round 3, 1987	24	5	
1093	Jim Stynes	1987–1998	round 3, 1987	264	130	
1094	Steven O'Dwyer	1987–1991	round 4, 1987	84	45	
1095	Peter Kiel	1987	round 5, 1987	1	0	
1096	Bradley Sparks	1987–1989	round 6, 1987	4	4	
1097	Glenn Lovett	1987–1999	round 12, 1987	127	74	
1098	Dean Chiron	1987–1989	round 16, 1987	17	1	
1099	Andy Lovell	1988–1995	round 3, 1988	121	146	
1100	Peter Rohde	1988–1995	round 6, 1988	163	28	
1101	Jamie Duursma	1988–1989	round 7, 1988	33	0	
1102	Steven Febey	1987–2001	round 7, 1988	258	40	
1103	David Flintoff	1988–1991	round 9, 1988	31	20	
1104	Jay Viney	1988–1991	round 18, 1988	23	4	
1105	John Ahern	1989–1990	round 1, 1989	2	0	
1106	Dannie Seow	1989–1990	round 1, 1989	7	2	
1107	Stephen Tingay	1989–2000	round 1, 1989	162	84	
1108	Darren Bennett	1989–1993	round 3, 1989	74	215	
1109	Luke Beveridge	1989–1992	round 7, 1989	42	41	
1110	Tom Kavanagh	1989	round 7, 1989	2	1	
1111	John Howat	1989–1992	round 10, 1989	20	10	

=== 1990s ===
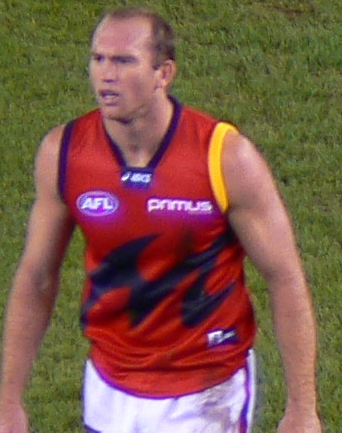
Former captain, David Neitz is the only player to have played 300 matches for Melbourne and is their games and goals record holder

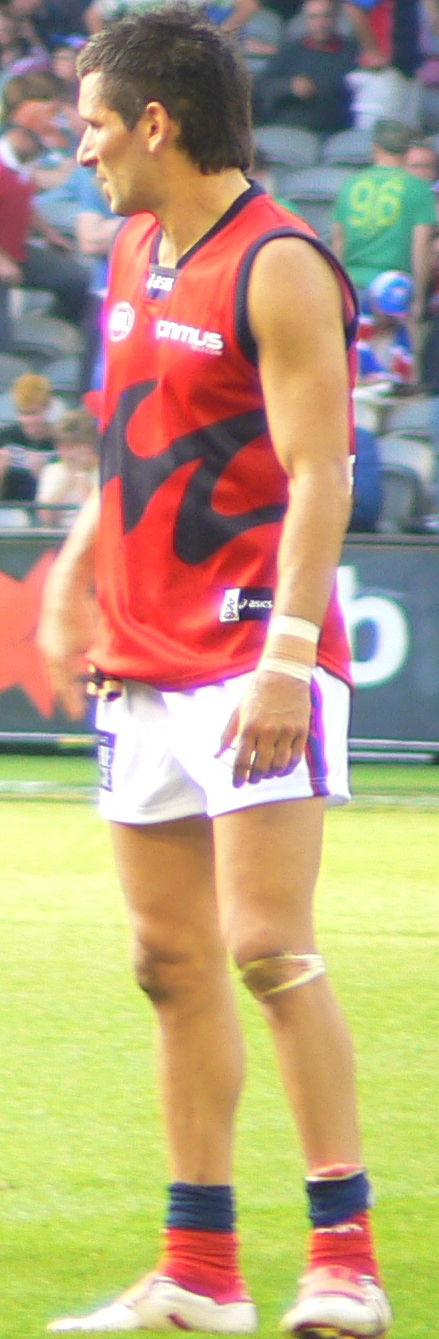
Adem Yze played 271 matches for Melbourne from 1995 to 2008

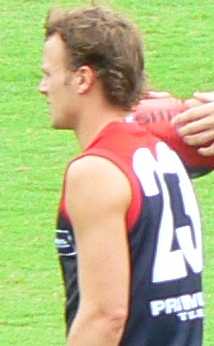
James McDonald was Melbourne's captain from 2008 to 2010 and played 251 matches for Melbourne

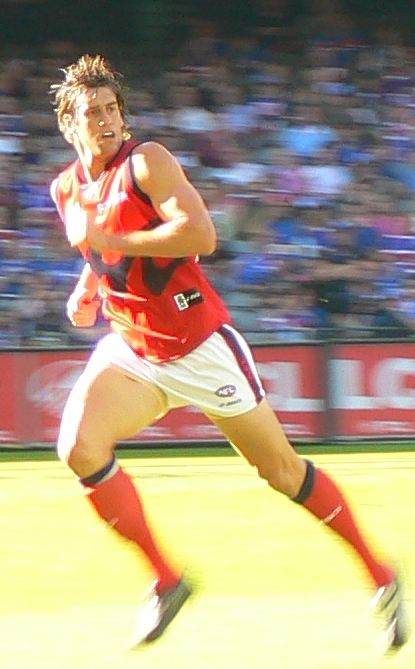
Jeff White played 236 games for Melbourne from 1998 to 2008

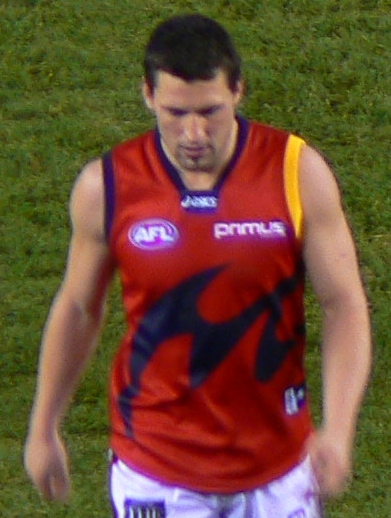
Russell Robertson kicked 428 goals for Melbourne and played 228 matches from 1997 to 2009

Order	Name	Seasons	Debut	Games	Goals	Source
1112	Steven Clark	1990–1991	round 1, 1990	21	17	
1113	Andrew Obst	1990–1997	round 1, 1990	149	60	
1114	Trevor Spencer	1990–1991	round 1, 1990	3	0	
1115	Stuart Cameron	1990	round 10, 1990	5	1	
1116	Brent Heaver	1990–1991	round 11, 1990	12	12	
1117	Rod Keogh	1989–1993	round 11, 1990	22	8	
1118	Robert Hickmott	1990–1991	round 13, 1990	2	0	
1119	Matthew Mahoney	1989–1992	round 19, 1990	6	0	
1120	Phil Egan	1991	round 1, 1991	1	0	
1121	Allen Jakovich	1991–1994	round 1, 1991	47	201	
1122	Rod Owen	1991	round 1, 1991	9	19	
1123	David Schwarz	1991–2002	round 1, 1991	173	243	
1124	Darren Cuthbertson	1988–1993	round 2, 1991	32	43	
1125	Paul Bryce	1991–1992	round 3, 1991	26	3	
1126	Kevin Dyson	1991–1995	round 3, 1991	70	25	
1127	Andrew Ford	1989–1992	round 6, 1991	8	1	
1128	Fabian Francis	1991–1992	round 17, 1991	1	0	
1129	Andrew Lamprill	1992–1997	round 2, 1992	36	3	
1130	Michael Pickering	1992–1993	round 2, 1992	15	12	
1131	Chris Sullivan	1992–1994	round 4, 1992	27	22	
1132	Andy Goodwin	1992–1993	round 5, 1992	17	0	
1133	Wayne Henwood	1992	round 5, 1992	1	0	
1134	Grant Williams	1992	round 5, 1992	4	5	
1135	Wayne Lamb	1992–1994	round 7, 1992	2	0	
1136	Haydn Robins	1992–1993	round 9, 1992	20	1	
1137	Sean Charles	1992–1997	round 10, 1992	47	60	
1138	Brian Stynes	1991–1992	round 10, 1992	2	0	
1139	Stephen Wearne	1992	round 13, 1992	3	2	
1140	Matthew Febey	1987, 1990–2000	round 15, 1992	143	44	
1141	Darren Kowal	1992–1999	round 21, 1992	105	46	
1142	Shane Burgmann	1991–1993	round 24, 1992	1	0	
1143	Phil Gilbert	1992–1994	round 1, 1993	25	6	
1144	David Neitz	1993–2008	round 1, 1993	306	631	
1145	Martin Pike	1993–1994	round 1, 1993	24	25	
1146	Greg Doyle	1993–1996	round 4, 1993	29	14	
1147	Paul Hopgood	1993–2000	round 4, 1993	113	10	
1148	Glenn Molloy	1993–1996	round 10, 1993	20	4	
1149	Scott Simister	1993	round 11, 1993	3	2	
1150	Jason Norrish	1992–1994	round 14, 1993	20	2	
1151	Adrian Campbell	1993–1994	round 21, 1993	2	5	
1152	Jeff Hilton	1993–1996	round 1, 1994	43	23	
1153	Paul Prymke	1993–1996	round 1, 1994	49	2	
1154	Brad Campbell	1993–1994	round 19, 1994	1	0	
1155	Dean Irving	1994–1997	round 22, 1994	23	4	
1156	Jeff Farmer	1995–2001	round 1, 1995	118	259	
1157	Luke Norman	1995–1996	round 1, 1995	16	3	
1158	Marcus Seecamp	1995–2000	round 1, 1995	89	8	
1159	Shaun Smith	1995–1998	round 1, 1995	62	96	
1160	Martin Heppell	1995	round 4, 1995	2	0	
1161	Damien Gaspar	1993–1998	round 8, 1995	29	0	
1162	Clay Sampson	1995–1996	round 12, 1995	41	1	
1163	Adem Yze	1995–2008	round 13, 1995	271	234	
1164	Trent Ormond-Allen	1994–1996	round 22, 1995	8	1	
1165	Alastair Clarkson	1996–1997	round 1, 1996	41	24	
1166	David Cockatoo-Collins	1995–1997	round 1, 1996	2	0	
1167	Don Cockatoo-Collins	1996–1998	round 1, 1996	9	3	
1168	David Grant	1996	round 1, 1996	7	0	
1169	Anthony Ingerson	1996–2001	round 1, 1996	121	15	
1170	Craig Turley	1996	round 1, 1996	16	8	
1171	Craig Nettelbeck	1996–1998	round 2, 1996	33	15	
1172	Darren O'Brien	1996–1997	round 4, 1996	24	9	
1173	Todd McHardy	1995–1997	round 7, 1996	5	1	
1174	Michael Polley	1995–1996	round 9, 1996	5	0	
1175	Andrew Leoncelli	1996–2003	round 16, 1996	146	66	
1176	Robert Pyman	1997	round 1, 1997	19	8	
1177	Shane Woewodin	1997–2002	round 1, 1997	138	63	
1178	Leigh Newton	1997–1999	round 3, 1997	13	6	
1179	Nick Pesch	1997	round 3, 1997	4	0	
1180	Anthony McDonald	1997–2002	round 4, 1997	104	41	
1181	Alistair Nicholson	1997–2006	round 6, 1997	110	3	
1182	Brent Grgic	1997–2001	round 14, 1997	77	29	
1183	James McDonald	1997–2010	round 17, 1997	251	56	
1184	Russell Robertson	1997–2009	round 20, 1997	228	428	
1185	Travis Johnstone	1998–2007	round 1, 1998	160	111	
1186	Hayden Lamaro	1997–1998	round 1, 1998	2	0	
1187	Guy Rigoni	1998–2005	round 1, 1998	107	35	
1188	Jamie Shanahan	1998–1999	round 1, 1998	37	0	
1189	Craig Smoker	1998–1999	round 1, 1998	17	12	
1190	Jeff White	1998–2008	round 1, 1998	236	95	
1191	Nathan Brown	1998–2007	round 4, 1998	146	36	
1192	Matthew Bishop	1998–1999	round 5, 1998	18	4	
1193	Troy Longmuir	1998–1999	round 9, 1998	17	3	
1194	Mark Bradly	1996–2000	round 10, 1998	4	3	
1195	Daniel Ward	1997–2007	round 10, 1998	136	31	
1196	Matthew Collins	1998–2001	round 19, 1998	29	5	
1197	Scott Chisholm	1999–2000	round 1, 1999	18	8	
1198	Chris Lamb	1999–2003	round 1, 1999	21	1	
1199	Luke Ottens	1999	round 1, 1999	4	0	
1200	Peter Walsh	1999–2004	round 2, 1999	104	31	
1201	Ben Beams	1997–2001	round 5, 1999	23	17	
1202	Nick Carter	1999	round 7, 1999	3	1	
1203	Troy Simmonds	1999–2001	round 9, 1999	40	7	
1204	Luke Williams	1999–2005	round 17, 1999	51	10	

=== 2000s ===
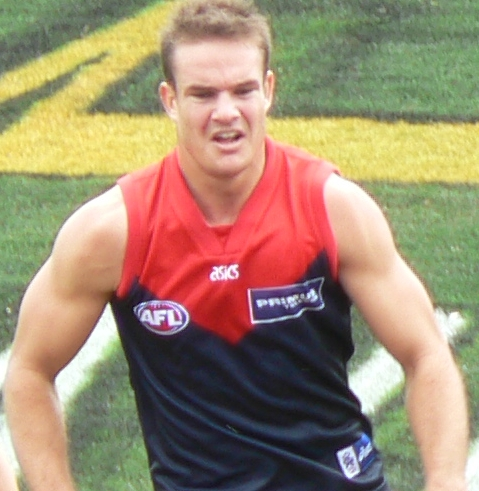
Former captain, Brad Green played 254 matches for Melbourne from 2000 to 2012

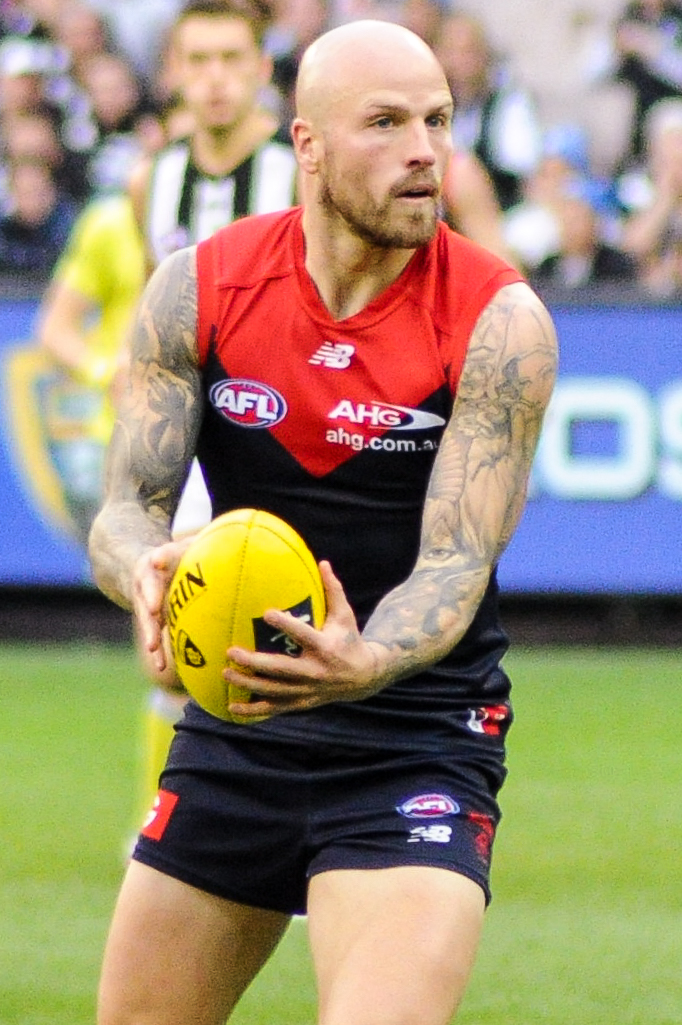
Former captain, Nathan Jones played 302 games

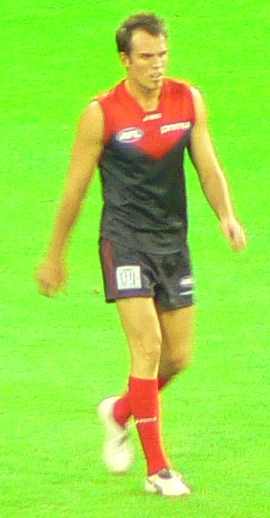
Cameron Bruce played 224 matches for Melbourne from 2000 to 2010

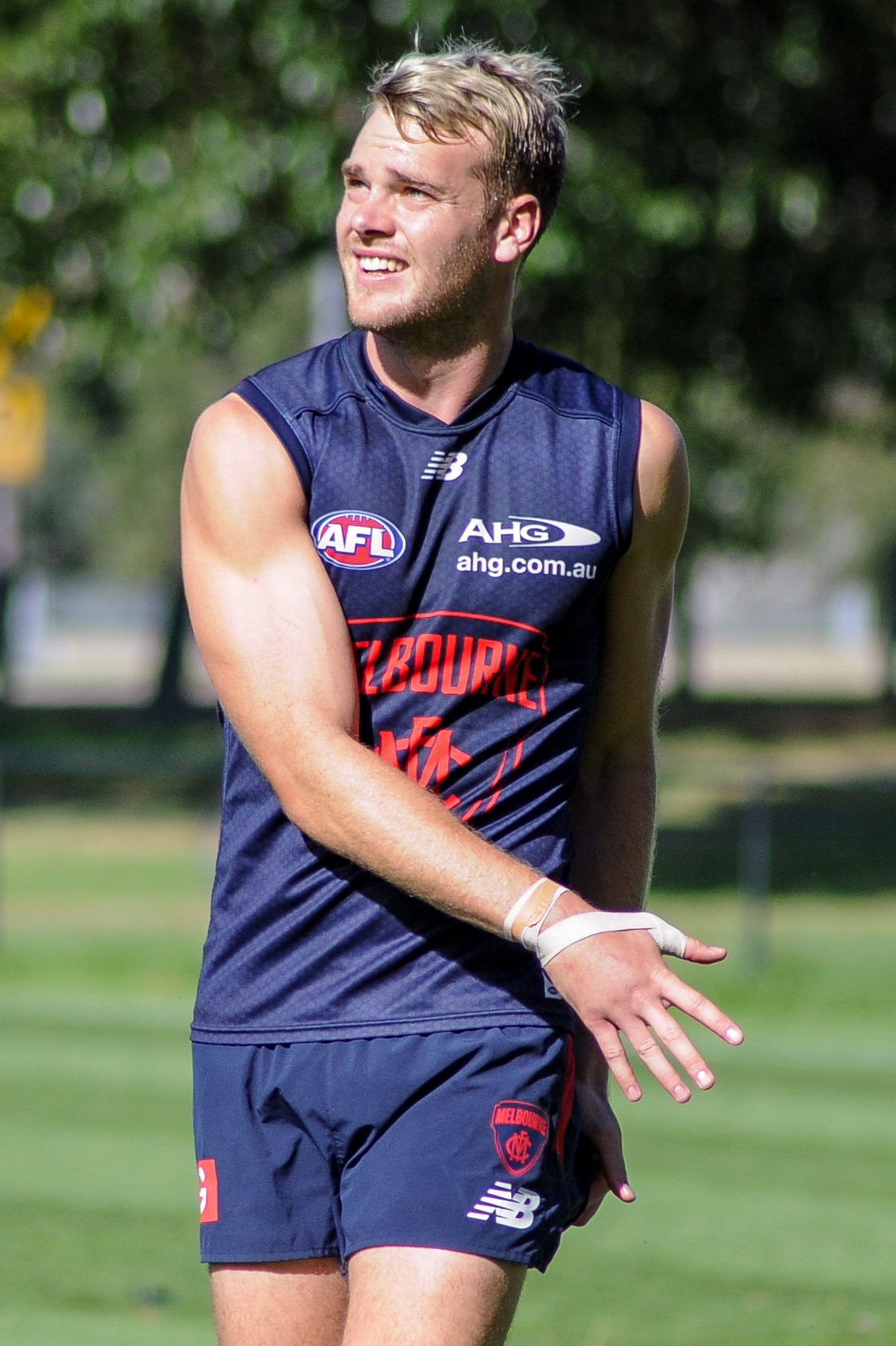
Jack Watts played 153 matches for Melbourne from 2009 to 2017

Order	Name	Seasons	Debut	Games	Goals	Source
1205	Cameron Bruce	2000–2010	round 1, 2000	224	210	
1206	James Cook	2000	round 1, 2000	3	8	
1207	Stephen Powell	2000–2002	round 1, 2000	44	43	
1208	Brad Green	2000–2012	round 2, 2000	254	350	
1209	Paul Wheatley	2000–2009	round 2, 2000	135	34	
1210	Matthew Whelan	2000–2009	round 4, 2000	150	15	
1211	Steven Pitt	2000–2001	round 8, 2000	5	2	
1212	Simon Godfrey	2000–2007	round 20, 2000	105	23	
1213	Ross Funcke	2001–2002	round 1, 2001	13	4	
1214	Darren Jolly	2001–2004	round 2, 2001	48	11	
1215	Troy Broadbridge	2001–2004	round 8, 2001	40	2	
1216	Scott Thompson	2001–2004	round 10, 2001	39	17	
1217	Steven Armstrong	2002–2005	round 1, 2002	43	21	
1218	Clint Bizzell	2002–2007	round 1, 2002	88	7	
1219	Peter Vardy	2002–2004	round 2, 2002	41	56	
1220	Craig Ellis	2002	round 4, 2002	15	1	
1221	Brad Miller	2002–2010	round 8, 2002	133	89	
1222	Michael Clark	2000–2003	round 22, 2002	1	1	
1223	Ryan Ferguson	2003–2007	round 1, 2003	47	6	
1224	Chris Heffernan	2003–2005	round 1, 2003	47	10	
1225	Mark Jamar	2002–2015	round 1, 2003	155	56	
1226	Gary Moorcroft	2003	round 2, 2003	3	2	
1227	Nick Smith	2003–2006	round 3, 2003	4	0	
1228	Nathan Carroll	2003–2008	round 4, 2003	71	1	
1229	Cameron Hunter	2003–2004	round 18, 2003	2	0	
1230	Jared Rivers	2003–2012	round 19, 2003	150	18	
1231	Aaron Davey	2004–2013	round 1, 2004	178	174	
1232	Ben Holland	2004–2008	round 1, 2004	66	55	
1233	Phillip Read	2004–2006	round 2, 2004	34	8	
1234	Colin Sylvia	2004–2013	round 9, 2004	157	129	
1235	Brock McLean	2004–2009	round 11, 2004	94	39	
1236	Daniel Bell	2003–2010	round 15, 2004	66	1	
1237	Brent Moloney	2005–2012	round 1, 2005	122	31	
1238	Shannon Motlop	2005–2006	round 5, 2005	10	5	
1239	Paul Johnson	2005–2010	round 7, 2005	68	20	
1240	Chris Johnson	2004–2008	round 8, 2005	31	2	
1241	Clint Bartram	2006–2012	round 1, 2006	103	17	
1242	Byron Pickett	2006–2007	round 1, 2006	29	16	
1243	Matthew Warnock	2005–2011	round 3, 2006	55	1	
1244	Matthew Bate	2005–2012	round 5, 2006	102	98	
1245	Lynden Dunn	2005–2016	round 6, 2006	165	97	
1246	Nathan Jones	2006–2021	round 17, 2006	302	141	
1247	Colin Garland	2007–2017	round 5, 2007	141	16	
1248	Ricky Petterd	2007–2012	round 5, 2007	54	55	
1249	James Frawley	2007–2014	round 9, 2007	139	18	
1250	Michael Newton	2005–2011	round 13, 2007	28	35	
1251	Simon Buckley	2006–2009	round 14, 2007	21	3	
1252	Jace Bode	2006–2008	round 19, 2007	9	3	
1253	Cale Morton	2008–2012	round 1, 2008	73	33	
1254	Isaac Weetra	2007–2008	round 1, 2008	2	0	
1255	Austin Wonaeamirri	2008–2011	round 3, 2008	31	37	
1256	Shane Valenti	2008–2009	round 8, 2008	15	5	
1257	Stefan Martin	2008–2012	round 14, 2008	57	23	
1258	Addam Maric	2008–2011	round 17, 2008	21	15	
1259	Jack Grimes	2008–2016	round 22, 2008	100	11	
1260	Jamie Bennell	2009–2012	round 1, 2009	57	23	
1261	Kyle Cheney	2008–2010	round 1, 2009	14	0	
1262	Neville Jetta	2009–2021	round 1, 2009	159	24	
1263	Jake Spencer	2008–2017	round 1, 2009	38	8	
1264	John Meesen	2008–2010	round 3, 2009	4	0	
1265	Jack Watts	2009–2017	round 11, 2009	153	143	
1266	Liam Jurrah	2009–2012	round 12, 2009	36	81	
1267	Jordie McKenzie	2009–2015	round 17, 2009	79	10	
1268	Rohan Bail	2009–2015	round 19, 2009	71	28	
1269	Tom McNamara	2008–2011	round 19, 2009	4	1	

=== 2010s ===
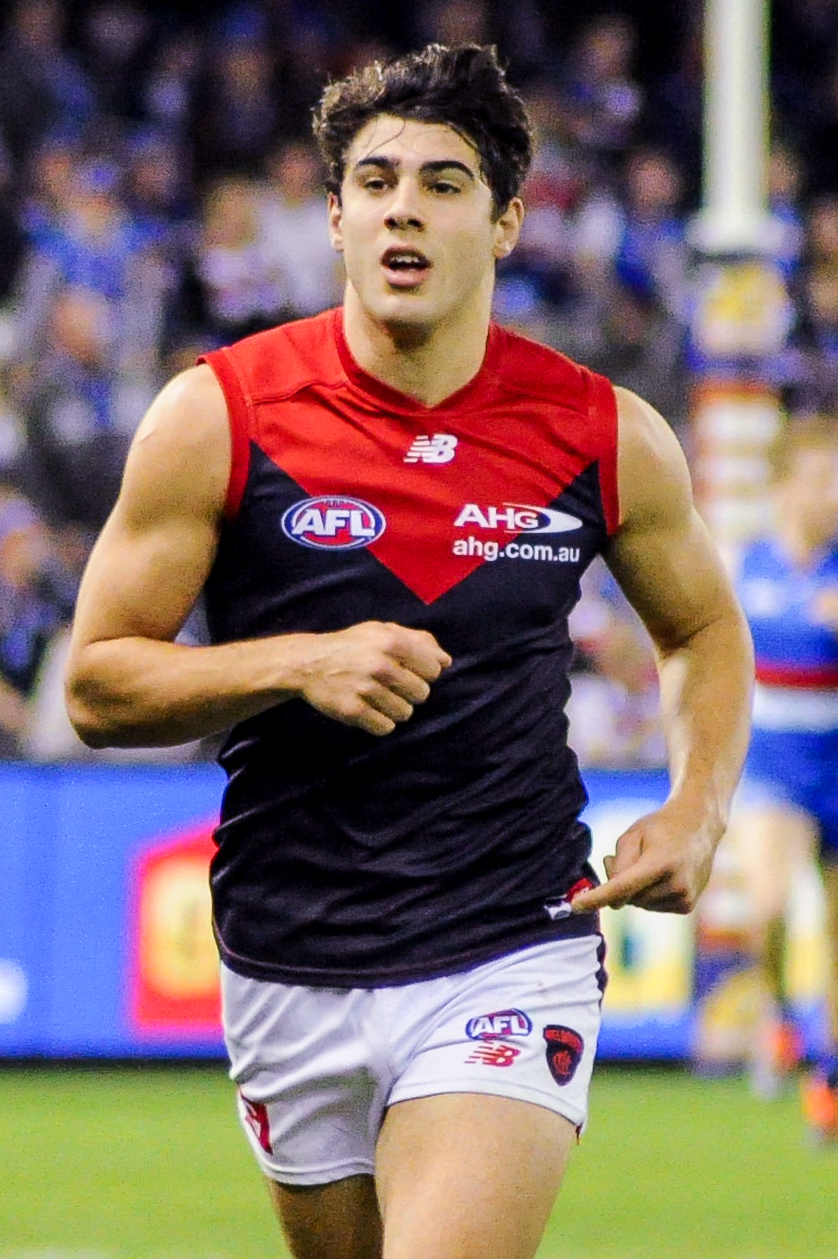
Christian Petracca is a Norm Smith medallist and four-time All-Australian.

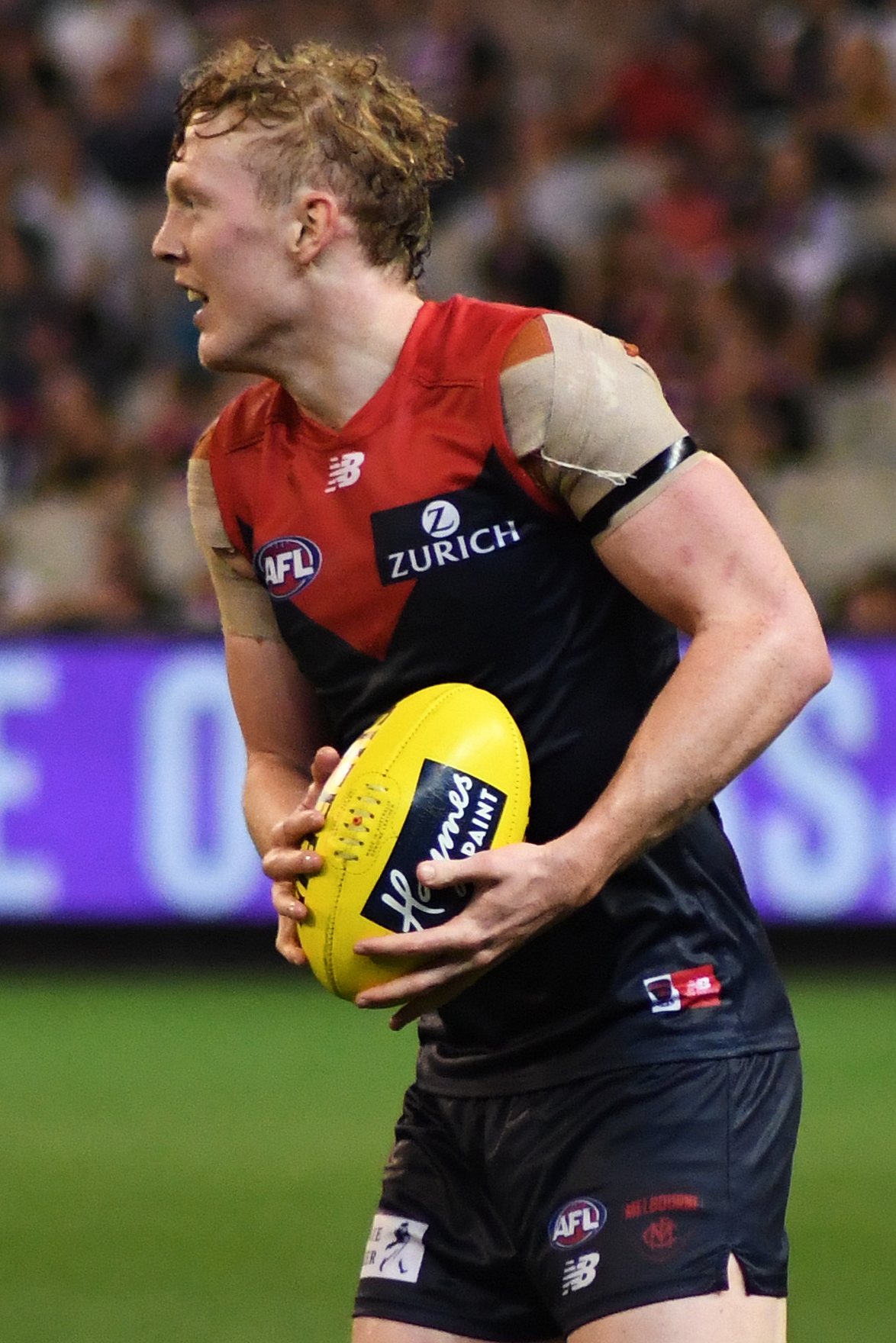
Clayton Oliver was a 2021 premiership player and four-time best and fairest winner.

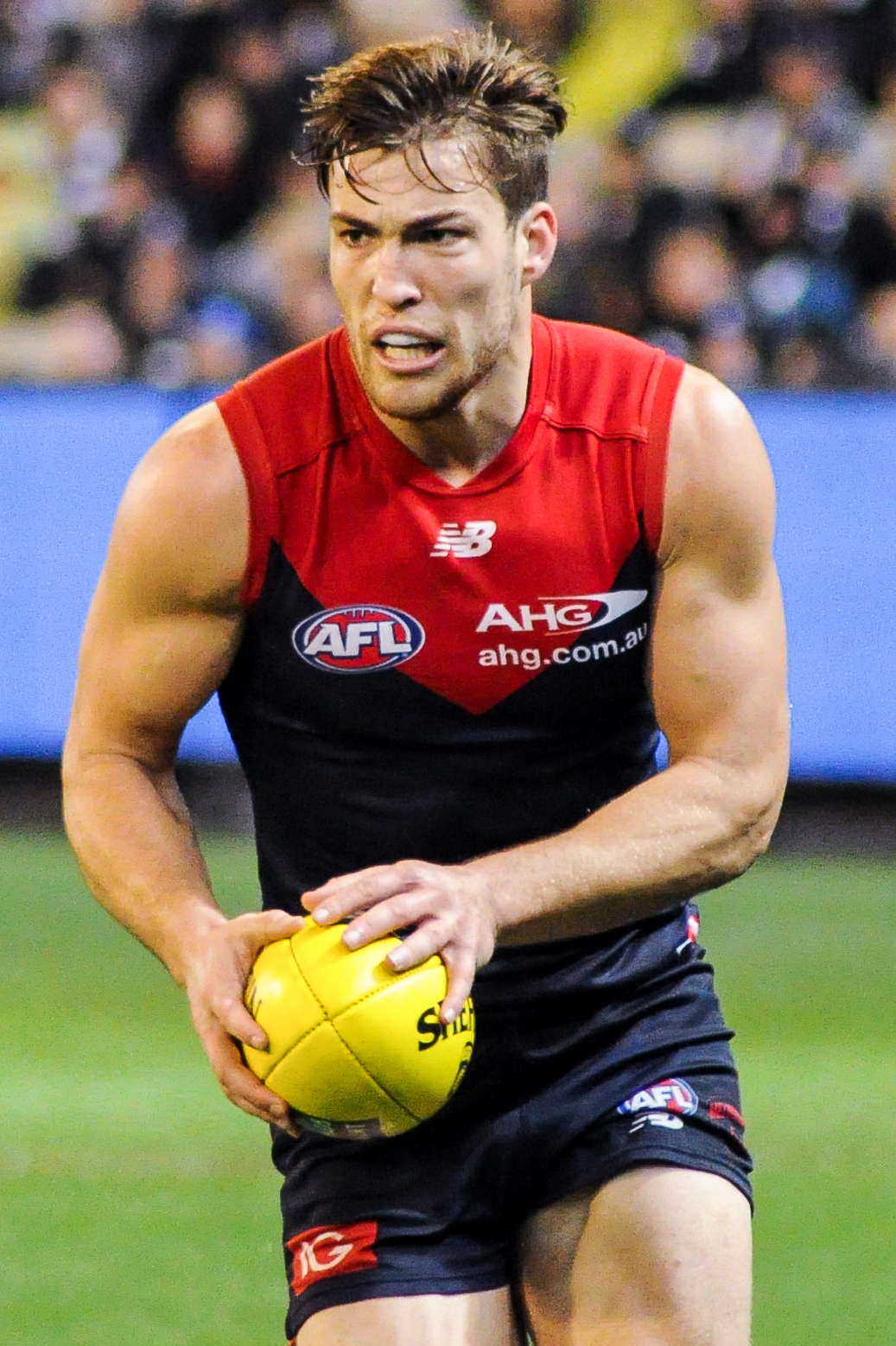
Jack Viney was a premiership player in 2021 and co-captain between 2017 and 2019.

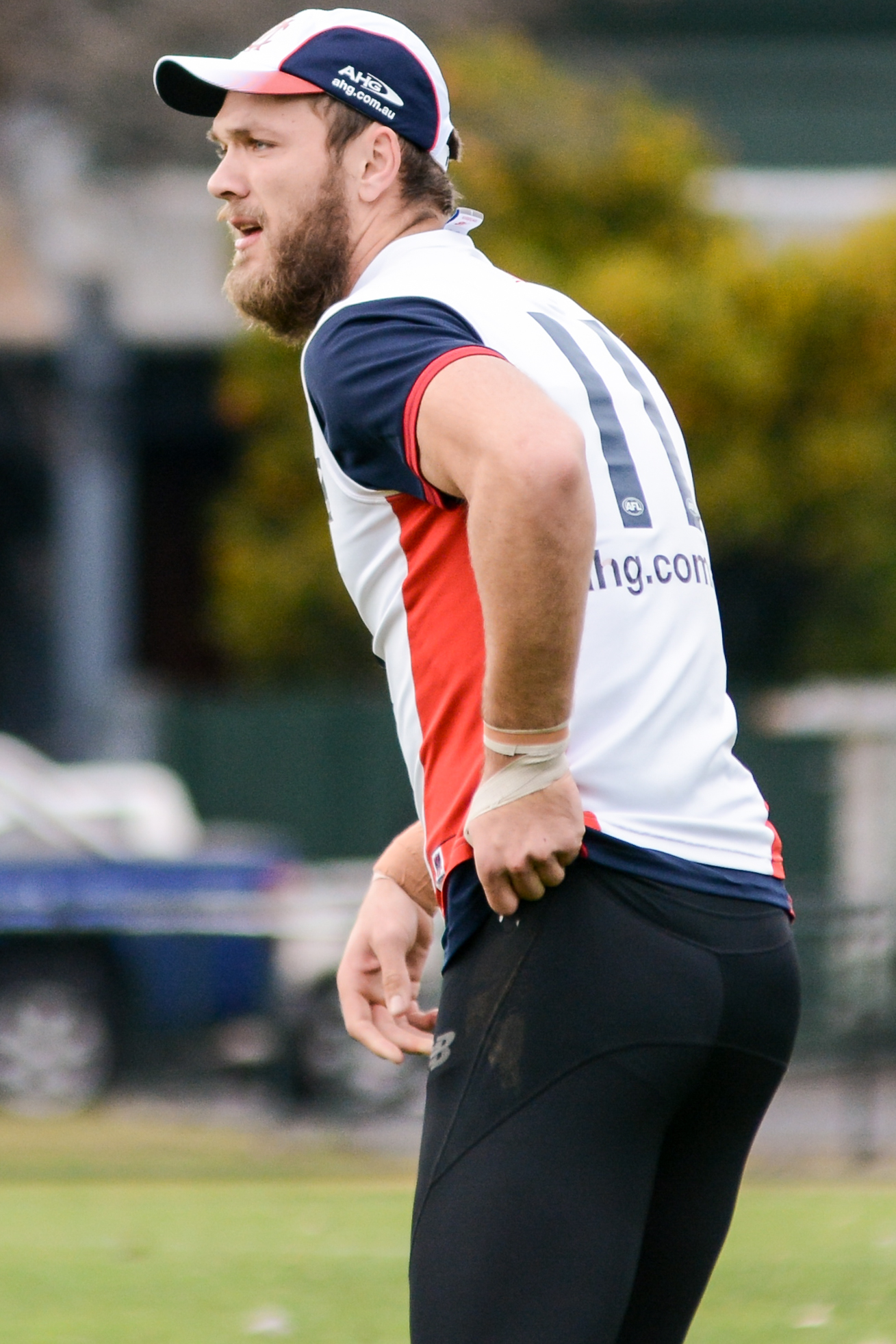
Max Gawn was a premiership captain in 2021.

Order	Name	Seasons	Debut	Games	Goals	Source
1270	Joel Macdonald	2010–2013	round 1, 2010	44	0	
1271	Tom Scully	2010–2011	round 1, 2010	31	6	
1272	James Strauss	2009–2014	round 1, 2010	24	1	
1273	Jack Trengove	2010–2017	round 1, 2010	86	39	
1274	Daniel Hughes	2006–2007, 2009–2010	round 7, 2010	2	2	
1275	Jordan Gysberts	2010–2012	round 10, 2010	19	3	
1276	Luke Tapscott	2010–2014	round 1, 2011	48	12	
1277	Michael Evans	2011–2014	round 9, 2011	16	7	
1278	Daniel Nicholson	2011–2014	round 10, 2011	32	4	
1279	Max Gawn^	2011–	round 11, 2011	247	115	
1280	Jeremy Howe	2011–2015	round 11, 2011	100	80	
1281	Sam Blease	2009–2014	round 15, 2011	33	25	
1282	Tom McDonald^	2011–	round 23, 2011	249	170	
1283	Jack Fitzpatrick	2010–2015	round 24, 2011	22	24	
1284	Mitch Clark	2012–2014	round 1, 2012	15	36	
1285	James Magner	2012–2013	round 1, 2012	19	4	
1286	Josh Tynan	2012–2013	round 1, 2012	2	0	
1287	James Sellar	2012–2013	round 2, 2012	23	11	
1288	Tom Couch	2012–2013	round 16, 2012	3	0	
1289	Shannon Byrnes	2013–2014	round 1, 2013	23	17	
1290	Tom Gillies	2013	round 1, 2013	2	0	
1291	Matt Jones	2013–2016	round 1, 2013	61	11	
1292	Cameron Pedersen	2013–2018	round 1, 2013	62	49	
1293	David Rodan	2013	round 1, 2013	9	2	
1294	Jimmy Toumpas	2013–2015	round 1, 2013	27	6	
1295	Jack Viney^	2013–	round 1, 2013	237	70	
1296	Dean Terlich	2013–2016	round 2, 2013	35	2	
1297	Dean Kent	2013–2018	round 6, 2013	63	63	
1298	Chris Dawes	2013–2016	round 7, 2013	50	47	
1299	Mitch Clisby	2013–2014	round 13, 2013	8	1	
1300	Troy Davis	2011–2013	round 20, 2013	2	1	
1301	Daniel Cross	2014–2015	round 1, 2014	39	1	
1302	Alex Georgiou	2014	round 1, 2014	7	0	
1303	Jay Kennedy Harris	2014–2019	round 1, 2014	39	12	
1304	Viv Michie	2014–2016	round 1, 2014	21	1	
1305	Dom Tyson	2014–2018	round 1, 2014	94	40	
1306	Bernie Vince	2014–2018	round 1, 2014	100	33	
1307	Christian Salem^	2014–	round 6, 2014	199	27	
1308	Aidan Riley	2014–2015	round 9, 2014	13	3	
1309	Dom Barry	2013–2014	round 15, 2014	5	0	
1310	Angus Brayshaw	2015–2023	round 1, 2015	167	49	
1311	Sam Frost	2015–2019	round 1, 2015	70	6	
1312	Jeff Garlett	2015–2019	round 1, 2015	78	138	
1313	Jesse Hogan	2014–2018	round 1, 2015	71	152	
1314	Heritier Lumumba	2015–2017	round 1, 2015	24	2	
1315	Ben Newton	2015–2016	round 1, 2015	13	12	
1316	Aaron vandenBerg	2015–2021	round 1, 2015	51	23	
1317	Billy Stretch	2015–2019	round 6, 2015	47	10	
1318	Alex Neal-Bullen	2015–2024	round 11, 2015	176	116	
1319	James Harmes	2014–2023	round 15, 2015	152	78	
1320	Oscar McDonald	2015–2020	round 22, 2015	81	1	
1321	Mitch White	2015–2017	round 23, 2015	4	0	
1322	Tomas Bugg	2016–2018	round 1, 2016	31	18	
1323	Ben Kennedy	2016–2017	round 1, 2016	15	13	
1324	Clayton Oliver	2016–2025	round 1, 2016	105	58	
1325	Josh Wagner	2016–2020	round 3, 2016	40	2	
1326	Jayden Hunt	2014–2022	round 4, 2016	114	43	
1327	Christian Petracca	2015–2025	round 6, 2016	212	202	
1328	Sam Weideman	2016–2022	round 20, 2016	59	62	
1329	Mitch Hannan	2017–2020	round 1, 2017	50	55	
1330	Jordan Lewis	2017–2019	round 1, 2017	55	16	
1331	Jake Melksham^	2016–	round 1, 2017	134	164	
1332	Joel Smith	2016–2024	round 1, 2017	42	12	
1333	Tim Smith	2017–2019	round 3, 2017	13	11	
1334	Michael Hibberd	2017–2023	round 5, 2017	113	3	
1335	Corey Maynard	2017–2019	round 20, 2017	2	1	
1336	Bayley Fritsch^	2018–	round 1, 2018	171	288	
1337	Jake Lever^	2018–	round 1, 2018	130	2	
1338	Charlie Spargo	2018–2025	round 6, 2018	108	64	
1339	Harry Petty^	2018–	round 15, 2018	101	48	
1340	Marty Hore	2019, 2024–2025	round 1, 2019	20	1	
1341	Tom Sparrow^	2019–	round 1, 2019	117	42	
1342	Corey Wagner	2019–2020	round 1, 2019	11	6	
1343	Kade Kolodjashnij	2019–2020	round 2, 2019	2	1	
1344	Jay Lockhart	20192020	round 2, 2019	22	9	
1345	Steven May	2019–2025	round 2, 2019	128	3	
1346	Braydon Preuss	2019–2020	round 4, 2019	10	4	
1347	Declan Keilty	2019	round 7, 2019	2	0	
1348	Oskar Baker	2019–2021	round 9, 2019	15	4	
1349	Kyle Dunkley	2019	round 16, 2019	6	3	
1350	Kade Chandler^	2019–	round 22, 2019	79	60	

=== 2020s ===
Order	Name	Seasons	Debut	Games	Goals
1351	Toby Bedford	2020–2022	round 1, 2020	18	9
1352	Mitch Brown	2020–2022	round 1, 2020	9	6
1353	Ed Langdon^	2020–	round 1, 2020	134	51
1354	Kysaiah Pickett^	2020–	round 1, 2020	126	201
1355	Adam Tomlinson	2020–2024	round 1, 2020	45	0
1356	Harley Bennell	2020	round 2, 2020	5	3
1357	Luke Jackson	2020–2022	round 2, 2020	52	30
1358	Trent Rivers^	2020–	round 2, 2020	123	13
1359	James Jordon	2021–2023	round 1, 2021	65	17
1360	Ben Brown	2021–2024	round 7, 2021	45	73
1361	Jake Bowey^	2021–	round 20, 2021	84	8
1362	Luke Dunstan	2022	round 6, 2022	5	0
1363	Daniel Turner^	2022–	round 13, 2022	37	24
1364	Brodie Grundy	2023	round 1, 2023	17	10
1365	Lachie Hunter	2023–2024	round 1, 2023	26	7
1366	Bailey Laurie^	2023–	round 1, 2023	12	2
1367	Judd McVee	2023–2025	round 1, 2023	65	1
1368	Jacob van Rooyen^	2023–	round 3, 2023	57	74
1369	Josh Schache	2023–2024	round 7, 2023	4	1
1370	Taj Woewodin	2023–2025	round 17, 2023	21	3
1371	Jack Billings	2024–2025	round 0, 2024	17	4
1372	Blake Howes^	2024–	round 0, 2024	28	1
1373	Caleb Windsor^	2024–	round 0, 2024	36	10
1374	Koltyn Tholstrup^	2024–	round 5, 2024	19	8
1375	Shane McAdam	2024–	round 10, 2024	3	1
1376	Kynan Brown	2024–2025	round 15, 2024	2	0
1377	Andy Moniz-Wakefield^	2024–	round 16, 2024	6	0
1378	Jack Henderson^	2025–	round 1, 2025	5	2
1379	Matthew Jefferson^	2025–	round 1, 2025	7	4
1380	Aidan Johnson^	2025–	round 1, 2025	5	3
1381	Harvey Langford^	2025–	round 1, 2025	22	14
1382	Xavier Lindsay^	2025–	round 1, 2025	18	2
1383	Harry Sharp^	2025–	round 1, 2025	18	10
1384	Tom Fullarton	2025	round 6, 2025	2	0
1385	Jai Culley^	2025–	round 21, 2025	4	3
1386	Jed Adams^	2025–	round 22, 2025	1	0
1387	Changkuoth Jiath^	2026–	round 1, 2026	8	0
1388	Brody Mihocek^	2026–	round 1, 2026	10	16
1389	Latrelle Pickett^	2026–	round 1, 2026	12	5
1390	Jack Steele^	2026–	round 1, 2026	14	3
1391	Paddy Cross^	2026–	round 3, 2026	8	6
1392	Max Heath^	2026–	round 6, 2026	6	1
1393	Xavier Taylor^	2026–	round 6, 2026	2	0
1394	Luker Kentfield^	2026–	round 13, 2026	2	1
1395	Lukas Cooke^	2026–	round 14, 2026	1	0
1395	Joel Fitzgerald^	2026–	round 14, 2026	1	0

== Other players ==
=== Listed players yet to make their debut for Melbourne ===
Player	Date of birth	Acquired	Recruited from	Listed	
Player	Date of birth	Acquired	Recruited from	Rookie	Senior
Ricky Mentha	4 September 2006	Category B rookie selection	Gippsland Power	2025–	—N/a
Oscar Berry	4 January 2002	Category B rookie selection	North Florida Ospreys (NCAA)	2026–	—N/a
Thomas Matthews	28 February 2007	No. 30, 2025 national draft	Gippsland Power	—N/a	2026–
Riley Onley	30 March 2007	No. 3, 2026 rookie draft	Murray Bushrangers	2026–	—N/a
Kalani White	5 May 2007	Pre-listed Category A rookie	Casey	2026–	—N/a
Max Mapley	27 October 2005	No. 19, 2026 mid-season rookie draft	Tasmania	2026–	—N/a

=== Listed players who did not play a senior game for Melbourne ===
Players who did not play a senior game for Melbourne

Player	Date of birth	Draft details	Recruited from	Listed		Source
Player	Date of birth	Draft details	Recruited from	Rookie	Senior	Source
Jim Cullen	9 June 1878	—N/a	Port Melbourne	—N/a	1902–1903	
Herman Bartlett	5 March 1892	—N/a	Fitzroy	—N/a	1911	
Frank Dossetor	11 December 1885	—N/a	University	—N/a	1911	
Arthur Slater	17 August 1890	—N/a	Essendon	—N/a	1911	
Sydney Bradley	Unknown	—N/a	Unknown	—N/a	1913	
Jack Sheehan	29 May 1890	—N/a	Collingwood	—N/a	1913	
Donald Wilson	Unknown	—N/a	Hawthorn	—N/a	1914	
Dick Gibbs	4 February 1892	—N/a	Caulfield Grammar/University	—N/a	1915	
Sam Brownbill	Unknown	—N/a	Unknown	1920s	—N/a	
Phil Furlong	18 February 1893	—N/a	Carlton District/Essendon	—N/a	1920	
Frank Mercovich	19 February 1898	—N/a	North Fitzroy/Carlton District/Carlton	—N/a	1920–1921	
Jimmy Rodgers	13 July 1897	—N/a	Unknown	—N/a	1921	
Wilfred Stott	18 March 1890	—N/a	Essendon/Richmond	—N/a	1921	
Keith Campbell	Unknown	—N/a	Scotch College	—N/a	1923	
Jim Lake	Unknown	—N/a	Unknown	—N/a	1923	
Tom Brownlees	19 December 1902	—N/a	Geelong	—N/a	1924	
Jim Crossan	Unknown	—N/a	North Melbourne Laurels	—N/a	1925–1927	
Harland Brown	Unknown	—N/a	Wangaratta	—N/a	1926	
Rupert Gibb	25 August 1900	—N/a	Richmond/Footscray	—N/a	1926–1927	
Fred Barker	31 October 1903	—N/a	Collingwood	—N/a	1927	
Dave Dick	8 January 1901	—N/a	St Kilda/Hampton Rovers/Essendon/Footscray	—N/a	1927	
Martin Bolger	19 August 1906	—N/a	Cathedral YCW	—N/a	1928	
Eric Cock	30 June 1902	—N/a	Collingwood	—N/a	1928	
Fred Goding	26 February 1905	—N/a	Oakleigh	—N/a	1928	
Nelson Hardiman	Unknown	—N/a	Birchip	—N/a	1928	
Gerry Matheson	27 August 1904	—N/a	Unknown	—N/a	1928	
Roy McDougall	2 July 1907	—N/a	Unknown	—N/a	1930	
Dave Nelson	26 February 1910	—N/a	North Melbourne	—N/a	1930–1932	
Artie Rennie	20 June 1906	—N/a	Essendon	—N/a	1930–1931	
Allan Oakley	7 January 1907	—N/a	Richmond	—N/a	1931	
Charlie Docherty	Unknown	—N/a	Unknown	—N/a	1932	
Ivan Sharp	Unknown	—N/a	Ivanhoe/Fitzroy	—N/a	1932–1933	
Ted Clauscen	17 June 1906	—N/a	North Melbourne	—N/a	1933	
Col Eyles	Unknown	—N/a	Longford	—N/a	1933	
Horrie Farmer	Unknown	—N/a	Warragul	—N/a	1933	
Arthur Kingsbury	Unknown	—N/a	East Fremantle	—N/a	1933	
Wally Koochew	Unknown	—N/a	Bunyip	1933	—N/a	
Ken Onley	14 December 1914	—N/a	Glen Iris	—N/a	1933–1934	
William Bourke	Unknown	—N/a	Unknown	1934	—N/a	
Milton Lamb	14 July 1909	—N/a	Geelong	—N/a	1934	
Percy Cheffers	Unknown	—N/a	Unknown	1934–1935	—N/a	
Les Cody	Unknown	—N/a	Castlemaine	—N/a	1934	
Trevor Jones	Unknown	—N/a	Unknown	1934–1935	—N/a	
Frank Morgan	Unknown	—N/a	North Melbourne	—N/a	1934	
Bert Palmer	Unknown	—N/a	Finlay	—N/a	1934	
Harold Stone	Unknown	—N/a	Sale	—N/a	1934–1935	
Allan Thompson	27 October 1910	—N/a	Unknown	—N/a	1934	
Lew Thompson	Unknown	—N/a	Whitton	—N/a	1934–1935	
Vic Harrison	13 January 1911	—N/a	Unknown	—N/a	1935	
Fred King	Unknown	—N/a	Warracknabeel	1935	—N/a	
Bill Warne	21 August 1914	—N/a	Stawell	—N/a	1935–1936	
Ray Wilson	Unknown	—N/a	Yarra Junction	1935	—N/a	
Roy Allen	Unknown	—N/a	Naracoote	—N/a	1936	
Hugh Fischer	Unknown	—N/a	Oakleigh	1936–1939	—N/a	
Colin Wilcox	Unknown	—N/a	Wodonga	1936–1937	1938	
Bob Bawden	28 February 1917	—N/a	Morwell	—N/a	1937	
Stan Livingstone	16 September 1913	—N/a	Unknown	—N/a	1937	
Fred Matthews	Unknown	—N/a	Wodonga	—N/a	1937	
Kenneth McFee	Unknown	—N/a	Unknown	—N/a	1937	
Don Stewart	Unknown	—N/a	Unknown	1937	—N/a	
Stan Binns	Unknown	—N/a	Jeparit	—N/a	1938	
Harcourt Dowsley	15 July 1919	—N/a	Old Melburnians	1938–1940	—N/a	
Reg Outen	Unknown	—N/a	Unknown	1938–1939	—N/a	
George Rudolph	29 April 1901	—N/a	Hawthorn/Richmond/Coburg	—N/a	1938	
Colin Wilson	Unknown	—N/a	Williamstown	—N/a	1938	
Euan Campbell	Unknown	—N/a	Old Melburnians	—N/a	1939	
Vic Chanter	26 January 1921	—N/a	Alphington	1939–1945	—N/a	
Jim Cardwell	2 February 1916	—N/a	North Brunswick CYMS	—N/a	1939–1949	
Reg Geary	Unknown	—N/a	Unknown	1939	—N/a	
Reg Gregory	Unknown	—N/a	Burnie	1939	—N/a	
Johnny Hall	14 May 1917	—N/a	Hawthorn	—N/a	1939	
Jack Bray	Unknown	—N/a	Malvern	—N/a	1940	
Bill Coffield	Unknown	—N/a	Ballarat College	—N/a	1940–1941	
Joe Foden	Unknown	—N/a	Port Melbourne	—N/a	1942	
John Fraser	Unknown	—N/a	Unknown	—N/a	1942	
Mel Brock	Unknown	—N/a	Unknown	—N/a	1943	
Ted Fay	22 December 1911	—N/a	Essendon/Brunswick	—N/a	1943	
Wal Geier	Unknown	—N/a	Albury	—N/a	1943	
Reg Hesford	Unknown	—N/a	Claremont	—N/a	1943	
Kevin Dwyer	Unknown	—N/a	Glen Iris YCW	—N/a	1944	
Tom Egan	Unknown	—N/a	Glen Iris CYMS	—N/a	1944	
Bob Furler	Unknown	—N/a	North Adelaide	—N/a	1944	
Russell Grambeau	Unknown	—N/a	Black Rock	—N/a	1944	
Brian Hoare	Unknown	—N/a	Newman College	—N/a	1944	
Jack Indian	Unknown	—N/a	Unknown	1944	—N/a	
Ray Baston	Unknown	—N/a	Clayton	—N/a	1945	
Jack Falloon	Unknown	—N/a	Xavier	—N/a	1945	
Lloyd Fierakowski	Unknown	—N/a	Unknown	—N/a	1945	
George Gale	Unknown	—N/a	Unknown	—N/a	1945	
Jack Green	Unknown	—N/a	Unknown	—N/a	1945	
Arthur Irvine	Unknown	—N/a	Unknown	—N/a	1945	
Keith James	Unknown	—N/a	Bendigo	—N/a	1945	
Lloyd Lewis	Unknown	—N/a	Unknown	—N/a	1945	
Greg Lowry	Unknown	—N/a	Unknown	—N/a	1945	
Ken Herbert	27 December 1924	—N/a	Collingwood	—N/a	1946	
Burton Allen	Unknown	—N/a	Dromana	—N/a	1947	
Graham Coningsby	Unknown	—N/a	Melbourne High School Old Boys	1947–1951	—N/a	
Peter Cox	Unknown	—N/a	Unknown	—N/a	1947	
Greg Curtis	Unknown	—N/a	Rushworth	—N/a	1947	
Max Gilmour	Unknown	—N/a	Jeparit	—N/a	1947	
Noel Impey	Unknown	—N/a	Unknown	1947–1949	—N/a	
Dean Chapman	Unknown	—N/a	Unknown	1948	—N/a	
Howard Church	Unknown	—N/a	Mitcham	—N/a	1948	
John Landy	12 April 1930	—N/a	Unknown	1948–1949	—N/a	
Jack Cooper	29 December 1922	—N/a	Subiaco/Carlton	—N/a	1949	
Don Chipp	21 August 1925	—N/a	Fitzroy	1949	—N/a	
Peter Cram	Unknown	—N/a	Murtoa/Horsham	—N/a	1953	
Anthony Lance	4 August 1970	—N/a	Unknown	1987	1989–1990	
Tim McNeil	Unknown	No. 16, 1987 national draft	Norwood	—N/a	1988	
Nik Morey	8 January 1970	—N/a	Unknown	1988–1989	1990	
Jamie Solyom	18 January 1971	—N/a	Lalor	—N/a	1989–1990	
Terry Siderellis	16 May 1972	—N/a	Caulfield Grammar/Ormond	1989–1991	—N/a	
Paul Rouvray	18 April 1972	No. 25, 1989 national draft	Glenelg	—N/a	1990–1991	
Tim Moreland	13 July 1971	No. 57, 1989 national draft	Shepparton	—N/a	1990	
Glenn Wilkins	7 February 1973	No. 71, 1989 national draft	North Ballarat	—N/a	1990–1991	
Anthony Tohill	2 August 1971	No. 85, 1989 national draft	Derry	—N/a	1990–1991	
Scott Williamson	7 November 1970	No. 31, 1990 pre-season draft	Wangaratta Rovers	—N/a	1990	
Matthew Sexton	22 November 1969	No. 53, 1990 pre-season draft	Sandhurst	—N/a	1990	
Peter Van Der Meer	14 October 1965	No. 25, 1990 mid-season draft	Frankston	—N/a	1990	
David Morrison	16 February 1966	No. 42, 1990 mid-season draft	Devonport	—N/a	1990–1991	
Ashley Woods	25 January 1973	—N/a	Unknown	—N/a	1990	
Simon Theodore	23 August 1971	—N/a	Unknown	1990	1991	
Guyan Stroud	8 September 1971	—N/a	Mentone	1990	1991	
Troy Shannon	17 February 1972	—N/a	Edithvale-Aspendale	1990–1991	—N/a	
Anthony Stocker	24 September 1971	—N/a	St Kilda City	1990	1991	
Mark Peterson	30 October 1972	—N/a	Chelsea	1990–1991	—N/a	
Craig Scrimizzi	9 February 1974	—N/a	Epping	1990	—N/a	
Mark O'Sullivan	24 February 1972	—N/a	Assumption College	1990–1991	—N/a	
Scott Nelson	22 January 1972	—N/a	St. Peters	1990–1991	1992	
Shane Mottram	22 January 1972	—N/a	Unknown	—N/a	1990	
Danny McCarthy	2 September 1972	—N/a	Dandenong	1990–1991	—N/a	
Robert Lemon	7 July 1972	—N/a	Dingley	1990–1991	1992	
Stuart Stevens	Unknown	—N/a	Unknown	1990s	—N/a	
Jess Sinclair	26 August 1978	—N/a	East Ringwood/Eastern Ranges	1990s	—N/a	
Gary Merritt	31 August 1972	No. 19, 1990 national draft	Tatura	—N/a	1991	
Robert Panozza	3 January 1974	No. 75, 1990 national draft	Wodonga Raiders	—N/a	1991	
Nick Sebo	Unknown	No. 17, 1991 pre-season draft	Ormond/St Kilda	—N/a	1991–1992	
Adam Williams	24 April 1974	—N/a	Unknown	—N/a	1991	
Robert Woodland	20 July 1973	—N/a	Bentleigh	1991	—N/a	
David Taylor	28 July 1975	—N/a	Parkmore	1991	1992–1993	
Warren Reuhland	18 January 1973	—N/a	Springvale	1991	—N/a	
Brad Pinches	14 April 1973	—N/a	Unknown	1991	—N/a	
Robert Makinson	21 November 1972	—N/a	Unknown	1991	—N/a	
Mark Mackenzie	15 June 1972	—N/a	Unknown	1991	—N/a	
Christian O'Brien	15 January 1974	No. 50, 1992 pre-season draft	Melbourne	1991	1992	
Ty-Ty Lim	10 May 1973	—N/a	Unknown	—N/a	1991	
Mathew Mackay	1 December 1972	No. 23, 1991 national draft	Hampton Park/Hawthorn	—N/a	1992–1993	
Haydon Kilmartin	22 July 1973	No. 31, 1991 national draft	North Hobart	—N/a	1992–1993	
Nick White	Unknown	No. 40, 1991 national draft	Wesley College/Richmond	—N/a	1992	
Ben Judd	Unknown	No. 39, 1992 pre-season draft	Sturt	—N/a	1992	
Nathan Smart	28 February 1974	—N/a	Unknown	—N/a	1992	
Scott Teal	Unknown	—N/a	Unknown	1992	—N/a	
Stephen Smith	24 December 1972	—N/a	Unknown	1992	—N/a	
Tom Shelton	Unknown	—N/a	Unknown	1992	—N/a	
Nick Perry	18 July 1972	—N/a	Unknown	1992	—N/a	
Matthew Kluzek	3 April 1973	No. 39, 1992 national draft	Woodville-West Torrens	1993	—N/a	
Damon Munt	8 December 1975	No. 122, 1992 national draft	Norwood	1993	—N/a	
Brad Smith	23 August 1974	—N/a	Northern Knights	1993	—N/a	
Anthony Tucker	23 August 1975	—N/a	Unknown	—N/a	1993	
Claude Sampieri	Unknown	—N/a	Unknown	1993	—N/a	
Michael O'Neill	Unknown	—N/a	Unknown	1993	—N/a	
Paul Ridley	1 June 1975	Traded (1993 national draft)	Subiaco/Collingwood	—N/a	1994	
Michael Prentice	1 September 1976	No. 42, 1993 national draft	Rosebud/Southern Stingrays	—N/a	1994–1995	
Ashley Reade	Unknown	No. 21, 1994 supplementary list draft	St Kilda	1994	—N/a	
Damien Slater	Unknown	—N/a	Unknown	1994	—N/a	
Adam Shanahan	Unknown	—N/a	Unknown	1994	—N/a	
Justin Pascoe	Unknown	—N/a	Collingwood	1994	—N/a	
Travis Millar	Unknown	No. 66, 1995 supplementary list draft	Fitzroy	1995	—N/a	
Adam Williamson	Unknown	—N/a	East Burwood	1995	—N/a	
John Ruecroft	Unknown	—N/a	Unknown	1995	—N/a	
Lee Orchard	Unknown	—N/a	Unknown	1995	—N/a	
Stuart Nagle	Unknown	—N/a	Unknown	1995	—N/a	
Damien Yze	Unknown	—N/a	Shepparton/Werribee	1996–1997	—N/a	
Rob Railton	Unknown	—N/a	Gippsland Power	1996	—N/a	
Rohan Price	Unknown	—N/a	Old Scotch	1996	—N/a	
Emil Parthenides	1 January 1978	—N/a	Beverley Hills/Eastern Ranges	1996	—N/a	
Allen Nash	Unknown	—N/a	Unknown	1996	—N/a	
Mark Winterton	11 February 1978	No. 75, 1996 national draft	Hallam/Noble Park/Southern Stingrays	—N/a	1997–1998	
Duncan O'Toole	18 December 1978	No. 82, 1996 national draft	Devonport	—N/a	1997	
Brett Zorzi	Unknown	—N/a	Northern Knights	1997, 1999	—N/a	
Greg Tivendale	19 April 1979	—N/a	Rythdale-Officer-Cardinia/Gippsland Power	1997	—N/a	
Jeremy Sutcliffe	Unknown	—N/a	Unknown	1997	—N/a	
David Stynes	Unknown	—N/a	Dublin	1997	—N/a	
Jason Saddington	23 October 1979	—N/a	Mitcham/Eastern Ranges	1997	—N/a	
Ben Physick	3 April 1979	—N/a	Unknown	1997	—N/a	
Brent Williams	13 February 1978	Traded (1997 national draft)	Parkmore/Prahran/Adelaide	—N/a	1998	
Matthew Blake	4 October 1979	No. 39, 1997 national draft	Bendigo Pioneers	—N/a	1998	
Scott Oram	Unknown	—N/a	Central Dragons	1998	—N/a	
Luke Taylor	23 May 1980	No. 49, 1998 national draft	Port Adelaide	2000	1999	
Luke Speers	13 June 1980	No. 60, 1998 national draft	Tassie Mariners	—N/a	1999–2000	
Cameron Ramsey	26 March 1980	No. 27, 1999 rookie draft	Doncaster/Oakleigh Chargers	1999–2000	—N/a	
Ollie Trand	Unknown	—N/a	Central Dragons	1999	—N/a	
Fraser Stevenson	Unknown	—N/a	Benalla	1999	—N/a	
Damien Peverill	12 July 1979	—N/a	Keilor Park/Carlton	1999	—N/a	
Damian Orlando	Unknown	—N/a	Dandenong Stingrays	1999	—N/a	
Ryan O'Keefe	24 January 1981	—N/a	Strathmore/Calder Cannons	1999	—N/a	
Glenn Muehllechner	Unknown	—N/a	Unknown	1999	—N/a	
Daniel Breese	21 April 1983	No. 62, 2000 national draft	Vermont/Eastern Ranges	—N/a	2001–2003	
Shannon O'Brien	19 May 1982	No. 63, 2000 national draft	Pakenham/Gippsland Power	—N/a	2001–2002	
Mitchell Craig	24 May 1982	No. 80, 2000 National Draft	Park Orchards/Eastern Ranges	—N/a	2001	
Nick Gill	25 August 1982	No. 10, 2001 pre-season draft	Glen Iris/Oakleigh Chargers/Scotch	—N/a	2001	
Mark Berts	6 December 1982	No. 46, 2001 rookie draft	Palmerston	2001	—N/a	
Benjamin Doherty	1 June 1981	No. 58, 2001 rookie draft	Morningside	2001	—N/a	
Thomas Marshall	24 August 1982	No. 64, 2001 rookie draft	Tassie Mariners	2001	—N/a	
Luke Molan	13 December 1983	No. 9, 2001 national draft	Geelong Falcons	2005	2002–2004	
Aaron Rogers	5 January 1984	No. 26, 2001 national draft	NSW/ACT Rams	—N/a	2002–2003	
David Robbins	9 August 1980	No. 22, 2002 rookie draft	Gippsland Power/Springvale	2002	—N/a	
Ryan Ayres	22 October 1983	No. 37, 2002 rookie draft	Gippsland Power/Springvale	2002–2003	—N/a	
Nicholas Walsh	14 June 1983	No. 72, 2002 rookie draft	Sandringham Dragons/St. Kevin's	2002–2003	—N/a	
Adam Fisher	11 April 1984	No. 11, 2003 rookie draft	North Ballarat Rebels	2003	—N/a	
Dale Carson	12 May 1984	No. 27, 2003 rookie draft	Western Jets	2003–2004	—N/a	
Ezra Poyas	24 March 1981	No. 43, 2003 rookie draft	Sandringham Dragons/Richmond	2003	—N/a	
Paul Newman	20 July 1983	No. 19, 2004 rookie draft	Kyabram	2004	—N/a	
Joel Campbell	21 December 1985	No. 50, 2004 rookie draft	Bendigo Pioneers	2004	—N/a	
Brendan Van Schaik	2 July 1986	No. 10, 2005 rookie draft	Murray Bushrangers	2005	—N/a	
Heath Neville	1 February 1988	No. 68, 2005 national draft	Tassie Mariners/Clarence	—N/a	2006–2007	
Shane Neaves	11 May 1987	No. 39, 2006 rookie draft	Calder Cannons	2006–2007	—N/a	
Andre Gianfagna	4 December 1987	No. 51, 2006 rookie draft	Northern Knights	2006	—N/a	
Trent Zomer	9 June 1989	No. 4, 2008 rookie draft	Eastern Ranges	2008–2009	—N/a	
Rhys Healey	13 April 1990	No. 17, 2009 rookie draft	Bendigo Pioneers	2009–2010	—N/a	
Cameron Johnston	24 February 1992	No. 63, 2011 rookie draft	St Josephs/Geelong Falcons	2011	—N/a	
Robert Campbell	2 June 1982	No. 75, 2011 rookie draft	Rutherglen/Murray Bushrangers/Hawthorn/Box Hill	2011	—N/a	
Lucas Cook	3 March 1992	No. 12, 2010 national draft	North Ballarat Rebels	—N/a	2011–2012	
Kelvin Lawrence	14 October 1992	No. 48, 2011 rookie draft	Peel Thunder	2011–2012	—N/a	
Jai Sheehan	27 January 1993	No. 6, 2012 rookie draft	Geelong Falcons	2012	—N/a	
Leigh Williams	19 May 1990	No. 59, 2012 rookie draft	Norwood (Victoria)	2012	—N/a	
Rory Taggert	20 June 1993	No. 36, 2011 national draft	North Ballarat Rebels	—N/a	2012–2013	
Nathan Stark	19 July 1994	No. 3, 2013 rookie draft	Glenelg	2013	—N/a	
Max King	24 September 1995	No. 19, 2014 rookie draft	Murray Bushrangers	2014–2016	—N/a	
Mitch King	1 January 1997	No. 42, 2015 national draft	Murray Bushrangers	—N/a	2016–2018	
Liam Hulett	17 March 1997	No. 46, 2015 national draft	Dandenong Stingrays	—N/a	2016–2017	
Pat McKenna	12 August 1996	2016 trade with Greater Western Sydney	Greater Western Sydney	—N/a	2017–2018	
Dion Johnstone	1 June 1998	No. 64, 2016 national draft	Oakleigh Chargers	—N/a	2017–2018	
Lochie Filipovic	29 August 1998	No. 8, 2016 rookie draft	Sandringham Dragons	2017–2018	—N/a	
Aaron Nietschke	26 May 2000	No. 53, 2018 national draft	Central District	2021	2019–2020	
Austin Bradtke	27 May 2000	Category B rookie	East Sandringham	2019–2021	—N/a	
Guy Walker	12 September 1995	Category B rookie	Victorian Bushrangers	2019	—N/a	
Fraser Rosman	30 May 2002	No. 34, 2020 national draft	Sandringham Dragons	—N/a	2021–2022	
Deakyn Smith	22 August 2002	Pre-season supplemental selection period	Dandenong Stingrays	2021–2023	—N/a	
Kye Declase	15 October 1996	No. 15, 2021 mid-season rookie draft	Werribee	2021	—N/a	
Kyah Farris-White	2 January 2004	Category B rookie selection	Willetton Tigers	2023–2024	—N/a	
Kye Turner	6 February 2002	Pre-season supplemental selection period	Frankston	2023	—N/a	
Will Verrall	11 March 2004	No. 14, 2022 rookie draft	South Adelaide	2023–2025	—N/a	
Oliver Sestan	15 April 2004	No. 28, 2022 rookie draft	Xavier College	2023–2025	—N/a	
Tom Campbell	2 November 1992	Unrestricted free agent	St Kilda	—N/a	2025–	

== AFLW players ==
Key
Order	Players are listed in order of debut
Seasons	Includes Melbourne only careers and spans from when a player was first listed with the club to their final year on the list
Debut	Debuts are for AFLW regular season and finals series matches only
Games	Statistics are for AFLW regular season and finals games only and are correct as of round ten, 2024.
Goals	Statistics are for AFLW regular season and finals games only and are correct as of round ten, 2024.

№	Name	Debut	Seasons	Games	Goals
1	Meg Downie	round 1, 2017	2017-2021	22	0
2	Emma Humphries	round 1, 2017	2017-2018	10	1
3	Paxy Paxman^	round 1, 2017	2017-	96	30
4	Elise O'Dea	round 1, 2017	2017-2020	28	6
5	Daisy Pearce	round 1, 2017	2017-S7 (2022)	55	25
6	Deanna Berry	round 1, 2017	2017	7	5
7	Sarah Lampard^	round 1, 2017	2017-	82	6
8	Alyssa Mifsud	round 1, 2017	2017-2018	9	10
9	Laura Duryea	round 1, 2017	2017-2018	11	0
10	Shelley Scott	round 1, 2017	2017-S6 (2022)	49	26
11	Katherine Smith	round 1, 2017	2017-2020	21	2
12	Lily Mithen	round 1, 2017	2017-2024	82	8
13	Lauren Pearce^	round 1, 2017	2017-	88	12
14	Aliesha Newman	round 1, 2017	2017-2020	25	11
15	Melissa Hickey	round 1, 2017	2017-2018	13	2
16	Jasmine Grierson	round 1, 2017	2017-2018	13	1
17	Harriet Cordner	round 1, 2017	2017-2020	25	1
18	Maddie Boyd	round 1, 2017	2017	7	0
19	Jessica Anderson	round 1, 2017	2017-2018	5	1
20	Richelle Cranston	round 1, 2017	2017-2018	13	6
21	Cat Phillips	round 1, 2017	2017-2019	20	6
22	Mia-Rae Clifford	round 1, 2017	2017	7	0
23	Sarah Jolly	round 2, 2017	2017	3	1
24	Brooke Patterson	round 2, 2017	2017-2019	11	0
25	Ainslie Kemp	round 4, 2017	2017-2020	10	0
26	Elise Hogan	round 6, 2017	2017	1	0
27	Tegan Cunningham	round 1, 2018	2018-2021	32	25
27	Bianca Jakobsson	round 1, 2018	2018-2019	13	3
28	Kate Hore^	round 1, 2018	2018-	97	108
29	Ashleigh Guest	round 1, 2018	2018-2019	11	0
30	Maddy Guerin	round 1, 2018	2018-2020	5	0
31	Erin Hoare	round 1, 2018	2018	4	0
32	Claudia Whitfort	round 5, 2018	2018-2019	4	0
33	Eden Zanker	round 5, 2018	2018-2025	85	77
34	Maddi Gay	round 1, 2019	2019-2023	47	12
35	Chantel Emonson	round 1, 2019	2019-2021	22	3
36	Ashleigh Woodland	round 1, 2019	2019	4	0
37	Shae Sloane	round 1, 2019	2019-2021	1	0
38	Tyla Hanks^	round 1, 2019	2019-	91	25
39	Shelley Heath^	round 6, 2019	2019-	82	8
40	Libby Birch	round 1, 2020	2020-2023	55	0
41	Casey Sherriff	round 1, 2020	2019-2023	48	9
42	Sinead Goldrick^	round 1, 2020	2020-	65	3
43	Gabrielle Colvin	round 1, 2020	2020-2025	40	0
44	Niamh McEvoy	round 2, 2020	2020-2021	8	1
45	Jacqueline Parry	round 4, 2020	2020-S6 (2022)	23	6
46	Brenna Tarrant	round 5, 2020	2020-S6 (2022)	15	1
47	Sarah Perkins	round 5, 2020	2020	3	3
48	Krstel Petrevski	Semi final, 2020	2020-2022 (S6)	4	2
49	Alyssa Bannan^	round 1, 2021	2021-	78	62
50	Eliza McNamara^	round 1, 2021	2021-	63	14
51	Megan Fitzsimon^	round 1, 2021	2021-	64	17
52	Lauren Magee	round 4, 2021	2021-2022 (S6)	11	0
53	Tayla Harris^	round 1, 2022 (S6)	2022 (S6)-	52	51
54	Eliza West	round 1, 2022 (S6)	2022 (S6)-2023	36	3
55	Maggie Caris	round 1, 2022 (S6)	2021-2022 (S7)	6	0
56	Alison Brown	round 1, 2022 (S6)	2022 (S6)-2022 (S7)	4	0
57	Olivia Purcell^	round 7, 2022 (S6)	2022 (S6)-	41	7
58	Tahlia Gillard^	round 7, 2022 (S6)	2022 (S6)-	53	1
59	Maeve Chaplin^	round 1, 2022 (S7)	2022 (S6)-	47	1
60	Jordan Ivey	round 1, 2022 (S7)	2022 (S7)-2023	6	0
61	Sammie Johnson	round 1, 2022 (S7)	2022 (S6)-2023	3	0
62	Charlotte Wilson	round 3, 2022 (S7)	2022 (S7)-2023	8	0
63	Georgia Campbell^	round 4, 2022 (S7)	2022 (S6)-	36	7
64	Blaithin Mackin^	round 4, 2022 (S7)	2022 (S6)-	35	7
65	Sabreena Duffy	round 5, 2022 (S7)	2022 (S7)	4	4
66	Aimee Mackin	round 4, 2023	2023-2025	6	2
67	Rhiannon Watt	round 7, 2023	2023-2024	13	0
68	Georgia Gall^	round 9, 2023	2022 (S7)-	26	18
69	Ryleigh Wotherspoon^	round 1, 2024	2024-	27	15
70	Grace Beasley^	round 1, 2024	2024-	3	1
71	Grace Hill	round 1, 2024	2024	8	0
72	Alyssia Pisano^	round 2, 2024	2024-	15	8
73	Denby Taylor	round 4, 2024	2024-2025	11	5
74	Lily Johnson	round 5, 2024	2024-2025	14	1
75	Delany Madigan	round 6, 2024	2024	1	0
76	Sarah D'Arcy	round 6, 2024	2024	2	0
77	Saraid Taylor^	round 8, 2024	2024-	15	0
78	Molly O'Hehir^	round 1, 2025	2025-	17	0
79	Laela Ebert^	round 1, 2025	2025-	17	0
80	Maggie Mahony^	round 1, 2025	2025-	15	7
81	Jemma Rigoni	round 3, 2025	2024-2025	8	1
82	Lauren Clifton^	round 1, 2026	2026-	2	0
83	Jacinta Hose^	round 1, 2026	2024-	1	0
84	Mia Austin^	round 1, 2026	2026-	3	7
85	Jordyn Allen^	round 1, 2026	2026-	4	0

=== Listed players yet to play a senior game for Melbourne ===
Player	Draft	Recruited From			
Player	Draft	Recruited From	Amelia Dethridge	2024 draft, pick 63	Cross-code signing
Chloe Baker-West	2025 draft, pick 22	Calder Cannons			
Aoife Horisk	Rookie signing	Gaelic football			
Jorja Livingstone	Injury replacement player	Western Bulldogs (VFLW)			
Tahlia Fellows	Injury replacement player	Collingwood (VFLW)			

=== Listed players who didn't play a senior game for Melbourne ===
Player	Acquired	Time listed			
Player	Acquired	Time listed	Pepa Randall	2016 draft, pick 151	2017
Stephanie De Bortoli	2016 draft, pick 72	2017			
Maddie Shevlin	2017 rookie draft, pick 13	2018			
Talia Radan	2018 trade period	2019			
Maddy Brancatisano	2018 draft, pick 15	2019			
Jordann Hickey	2018 draft, pick 22	2019			
Mietta Kendall	2020 draft, pick 41	2021			
Isabella Simmons	2020 draft, pick 48	2021-2022 (S6)			
Ella Little	Injury replacement player, 2022	2022 (S7)			
Georgie Fowler	Delisted free agent, 2023	2023			
