= List of VFL debuts in 1899 =

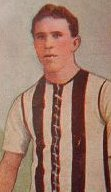
Bob Rush made his VFL debut in 1899

The 1899 VFL season was the third season of the Victorian Football League (VFL). Ninety two players made their senior debut in the 1899 season, while another 18 players debuted for a new club having previously played in the VFL.

== Summary ==
Summary of debuts in 1899
Club	VFL debuts	Change of club
Carlton	15	6
Collingwood	11	0
Essendon	7	1
Fitzroy	6	1
Geelong	6	0
Melbourne	10	1
St Kilda	23	7
South Melbourne	14	2
Total	92	18

== Debuts ==
Name	Club	Age at debut	Round debuted	Games	Goals	Notes
Henry McShane	Carlton	26 years, 93 days	1	82	28	Previously played for Geelong
Bill McNamara	Carlton	22 years, 338 days	1	69	8	
Will Stuckey	Carlton	25 years, 290 days	1	28	1	
Arthur Thompson	Carlton	27 years, 209 days	5	22	2	
Bob Bird	Carlton	23 years, 337 days	2	20	3	Previously played for Collingwood.
Billy Monagle	Carlton	22 years, 168 days	3	17	0	
Bobadil Hooper	Carlton	21 years, 57 days	1	14	0	
Denis Lanigan	Carlton	25 years, 2 days	2	14	2	Previously played for Collingwood and Melbourne.
Dick Walker	Carlton	26 years, 297 days	5	11	7	Previously played for Geelong.
Bill Collins	Carlton	28 years, 69 days	11	10	2	
Jack Gilbert	Carlton	24 years, 168 days	17	9	3	
Harry Evans	Carlton	19 years, 356 days	15	8	2	
George Cowell	Carlton	27 years, 194 days	1	7	4	Previously played for Collingwood.
Harry Thompson	Carlton	27 years, 240 days	12	6	8	Previously played for St Kilda.
Joe Archer	Carlton	21 years, 358 days	1	4	0	
Harry Lewis	Carlton	19 years, 19 days	8	4	2	
Alf Hearnden	Carlton	25 years, 114 days	1	3	0	
Artie McSpeerin	Carlton	19 years, 104 days	6	2	2	
Henry Allender	Carlton	27 years, 49 days	1	1	0	
Dick Gorsuch	Carlton	20 years, 231 days	10	1	0	
Victor Rapp	Carlton	18 years, 135 days	17	1	0	
Bob Rush	Collingwood	18 years, 223 days	2	143	1	Coached Collingwood to the 1930 premiership. Brother of Bryan, Gerald, Kevin and Leo Rush.
Doug Watsford	Collingwood	23 years, 138 days	10	21	7	
Johnny Lyons	Collingwood	23 years, 153 days	7	16	12	
Alf Catlin	Collingwood	23 years, 275 days	2	9	4	
Tom Carmody	Collingwood	19 years, 92 days	1	8	3	
Wilfred Fell	Collingwood	20 years, 42 days	4	7	0	
Jack Geddes	Collingwood	31 years, 98 days	1	2	1	
Jimmy Ryan	Collingwood	20 years, 84 days	3	2	0	
Albert Walsh	Collingwood	22 years, 113 days	3	2	0	
Jack Denning	Collingwood	24 years, 89 days	10	2	1	
Pat Fitzgerald	Collingwood	25 years, 62 days	1	1	0	
Billy Griffith	Essendon	18 years, 138 days	1	187	13	
Albert Thurgood	Essendon	25 years, 150 days	6	46	89	
Fred Scott	Essendon	25 years, 32 days	1	33	25	
Hugh Fitzpatrick	Essendon	26 years, 309 days	3	30	26	
Mick O'Loughlin	Essendon	23 years, 90 days	1	5	0	
Les Rainey	Essendon	18 years, 158 days	7	5	3	
Charlie McCartney	Essendon	23 years, 71 days	2	4	0	Previously played for South Melbourne.
Jim Cullen	Essendon	20 years, 338 days	1	1	0	Also played for South Melbourne in 1899.
Tammy Beauchamp	Fitzroy	20 years, 358 days	13	135	12	
Jack Deas	Fitzroy	23 years, 200 days	3	33	0	Previously played for South Melbourne.
Bill Thompson	Fitzroy	22 years, 248 days	1	10	1	
Bob Hay	Fitzroy	19 years, 163 days	14	8	1	
Charlie Foletta	Fitzroy	23 years, 265 days	8	5	1	
Tom Nolan	Fitzroy	22 years, 216 days	10	2	0	
Jack Mulcahy	Fitzroy	23 years, 0 days	14	2	0	
Teddy Lockwood	Geelong	26 years, 158 days	1	45	61	Twin brother of George Lockwood.
Tommy Buchan	Geelong	24 years, 198 days	1	41	20	
George Lockwood	Geelong	26 years, 158 days	1	40	7	Twin brother of Teddy Lockwood.
Norman Belcher	Geelong	19 years, 321 days	4	8	3	
Harry Parkin	Geelong	20 years, 31 days	11	2	0	
Pat O'Donnell	Geelong	22 years, 176 days	2	1	0	
Arthur Sowden	Melbourne	21 years, 37 days	1	117	13	
Dan Moriarty	Melbourne	23 years, 268 days	1	62	2	Previously played for Fitzroy.
Tommy Ryan	Melbourne	27 years, 216 days	1	55	63	
Curtis Reid	Melbourne	23 years, 29 days	3	20	0	
Charlie Illingworth	Melbourne	28 years, 91 days	1	14	0	
Fred Elliott	Melbourne	20 years, 36 days	1	12	4	First player to play 200 VFL games.
Cec Cumberland	Melbourne	24 years, 101 days	5	5	3	
Laurie Paul	Melbourne	18 years, 133 days	3	2	2	
Joe Finlay	Melbourne	20 years, 149 days	17	1	0	
Leo Rankin	Melbourne	19 years, 336 days	17	1	0	
Arthur Sinclair	Melbourne	19 years, 170 days	17	1	0	
Jimmy Smith	St Kilda	22 years, 129 days	1	130	22	
Dick McCabe	St Kilda	21 years, 339 days	2	73	4	Previously played for Fitzroy.
Billy McGregor	St Kilda	22 years, 174 days	1	28	2	
George Spilcker	St Kilda	24 years, 335 days	1	22	1	
Mal Markellie	St Kilda	18 years, 150 days	1	21	8	
Michael O'Gorman	St Kilda	24 years, 186 days	1	18	6	Previously played for South Melbourne.
Harold Brown	St Kilda	20 years, 247 days	3	14	0	Previously played for Essendon.
Ralph Robertson	St Kilda	18 years, 2 days	16	14	1	
Gerry Williams	St Kilda	21 years, 227 days	1	11	4	
George Sparrow	St Kilda		2	11	0	Previously played for South Melbourne.
Bill Blackwood	St Kilda	26 years, 117 days	6	10	2	Previously played for South Melbourne.
Jim Park	St Kilda	24 years, 11 days	8	9	0	Previously played for Essendon.
Ernie Glenister	St Kilda	25 years, 276 days	10	7	0	
Jack White	St Kilda	22 years, 237 days	1	6	1	
Charles Raff	St Kilda	20 years, 223 days	2	5	0	
Andy Allan	St Kilda	30 years, 46 days	12	4	0	
Bob Kenny	St Kilda	23 years, 78 days	1	2	0	
Harry Bond	St Kilda		3	2	0	
Gus Hefter	St Kilda	26 years, 70 days	9	2	0	
Ernie Greeves	St Kilda	26 years, 98 days	12	2	1	
Alec Wallace	St Kilda	18 years, 33 days	16	2	0	
Bill Wishart	St Kilda	17 years, 47 days	16	2	1	
Jack Ryan	St Kilda	25 years, 323 days	1	1	0	
Dick Robertson	St Kilda	22 years, 24 days	7	1	0	Previously played for Melbourne.
Michael Dalton	St Kilda	24 years, 46 days	9	1	0	
Jim Farnan	St Kilda	23 years, 361 days	9	1	0	
Herb Kennedy	St Kilda	22 years, 172 days	14	1	0	
Jim Opie	St Kilda	16 years, 178 days	15	1	0	
Alex Young	St Kilda	19 years, 330 days	16	1	0	
Wal Heron	St Kilda	24 years, 116 days	17	1	0	
Harry Lampe	South Melbourne	24 years, 261 days	1	135	57	
Charlie James	South Melbourne	25 years, 170 days	12	78	13	
Charlie Goding	South Melbourne	22 years, 283 days	1	63	60	Previously played for Melbourne.
Joe Garbutt	South Melbourne	20 years, 204 days	1	32	27	
Artie Henley	South Melbourne	20 years, 297 days	9	10	1	
Frank Arnold	South Melbourne	21 years, 308 days	7	9	0	
Bob Bryce	South Melbourne	29 years, 64 days	17	5	1	
Jack Incoll	South Melbourne	20 years, 099 days	3	4	3	
Jack Cockbill	South Melbourne	19 years, 67 days	1	3	0	
Dave Hutchison	South Melbourne	29 years, 94 days	5	2	0	
Henry Howson	South Melbourne	22 years, 21 days	13	2	0	
Arthur Nickless	South Melbourne	20 years, 56 days	1	1	0	
Jimmy Paterson	South Melbourne	29 years, 91 days	4	1	0	
Jim Cullen	South Melbourne	21 years, 15 days	8	1	0	Also played for Essendon in 1899.
Bernie Fritsch	South Melbourne	18 years, 162 days	12	1	1	
Joe Lowrey	South Melbourne	20 years, 30 days	16	1	0	
