= List of people from Brunswick, Victoria =

The following is a list of notable people from Brunswick, Victoria, Australia.

== Sports ==
=== Australian Rules football ===
- Henry Alder
- Rupert Balfe - also a soldier
- Alex Barningham
- Sam Barrett
- Archie Baxter
- Norm Beckton
- Vic Belcher
- Billy Blackman
- Jack Booth
- Chic Breese
- Phil Busbridge
- Wally Carter
- Tommy Cockram
- Col Crawford
- Claude Curtin
- Johnny Davies
- Harold Day
- Bill Denehy
- John Dowling
- Charlie Dummett
- Fred Finch
- John Fitzgerald
- Doug Fraser
- Jack Green
- Don Grossman
- Charlie Hackett
- Bill Harris
- George Hawkins
- Doug Hill
- Bill Heaphy
- Frank Hughes Jr.
- Alf Jackson - also military officer
- Maurie Johnson
- Fred Kennett
- Jim Kettle
- Ted Leehane
- Tom Maguire
- George Martin
- Aubrey Martyn
- Colin Martyn
- Jack McKenzie
- Sid Meehl
- John Mitchell
- Flurence Moore
- Georgia Nanscawen - also a hockey player
- Alan Nutter
- Mick O'Loughlin
- Les Oliver
- Norm Oliver
- Tom Pettit
- Henry Powell
- Les Powell
- Charles Rauber
- Frank Raymond
- Simon Roberts
- Pat Robertson
- Alan Sinclair
- Peter V. Smith
- Nicola Stevens
- Bill Stranger
- Joe Strong
- Charlie Tough
- Bernie Trafford
- Robert Walls
- Bill Wells
- Robert White
- Billy Wilson
- Vern Wright

=== Other sports ===
- David Cunningham - ice hockey player
- Sam Greco - martial artist
- Paul Hibbert - cricketer
- Bob Jane - race car driver and businessman
- Frank LoPorto - boxer
- Ian Lee - cricketer
- Terry MacGill - cricketer
- Luke McFadyen - rugby union player
- Richard Newman - cricketer
- Mickey Roche - cricketer
- Tarık Solak - kickboxing promoter
- Peter Thomson - golfer
- Henry Walkerden - cricketer

== Politics and judiciary ==
- Frederick Oswald Barnett - social reformer
- Ruth Hope Crow - political activist
- John Curtin - 14th Prime Minister of Australia
- Lily D'Ambrosio - politician
- Harold Daffen - politician
- Frederic Eggleston - politician and lawyer
- Mohammed El-Leissy - politician and comedian
- William Folster - politician
- Bob Gray - politician
- Frederick Hickford - politician
- Maurice Kennedy - politician and trade unionist
- Cyril Isaac - politician
- Bill Kelty - trade unionist
- Bert Kyle - New Zealand politician
- Edward Meagher - politician
- Eddie Micallef - politician
- Leonard Edward Bishop Stretton (1893–1967) – judge and royal commissioner.

== Music, arts and entertainment ==
- Sam Atyeo - painter and diplomat
- Charles William Bush (1919–1989) – artist
- Arthur Butchers - New Zealand historian
- Mae Dahlberg - actress
- Leonard French - artist
- Rosalie Ham - author
- The Hawking Brothers - musicians
- Shane Maloney - author
- Aamer Rahman - comedian
- Eric Smith - artist
- Katy Steele - musician
- Charles Richard Wilton - journalist

== Criminals ==
- Lewis Caine - criminal
- Christopher Dale Flannery - criminal
- Tony Mokbel - criminal

== Other ==
- Henry Garnet Forrest - flying ace
- Anne Syrett Green - welfare worker and evangelist
- Solomon Lew - businessman
- Coralie Ling - Christian Minister
- Shane Mackinlay - Catholic bishop
- Albert H. Maggs - bookmaker
- Sally Norton - plant scientist
- Andrew Wilkie - zoo director
- Harry Winbush - architect
