= Barningham =

Barningham may refer to:

== Places in England ==
- Barningham, County Durham
- Barningham, Suffolk
- Barningham Green, a village in Norfolk
- Little Barningham, Norfolk
- North Barningham, Norfolk

== People ==
- Alex Barningham (1889–1956), Australian rules footballer
- John Barningham (died 1448), English theologian
- Richard Barningham (16th century), English academic
