= Thomas Carmody =

Thomas Carmody may refer to:

- Thomas Carmody (New York politician), American lawyer and politician
- Thomas G. Carmody, member of the Louisiana House of Representatives
- Thomas Carmody (American football), American college football player and coach
- Tom Carmody, Australian rules footballer
