= James Cullen =

James Cullen may refer to:

- James Cullen (mathematician) (1867–1933), Irish Jesuit, described Cullen numbers
- James Cullen (PTAA) (1841–1921), Irish Jesuit, founder of the Pioneer Total Abstinence Association
- James P. Cullen (1945–2017), American brigadier general
- James Cullen (comics), fictional DC Comics character

== See also ==
- James Cullen Martin (1928–1999), American chemist
- Jim Cullen (1878–1954), Australian rules footballer
- Jim Cullen (skier), Canadian para-alpine skier
