= Leo Rankin =

Australian rules footballer

Personal information
- Full name: Leo Vincent Rankin
- Born: 8 October 1879; East Melbourne, Australia
- Died: 10 May 1917 (aged 37); Wareham, Dorset, United Kingdom
- Original team: Xavier College

Playing career^{1}
Years	Club	Games (Goals)
1899	Melbourne	1 (0)
- ^{1} Playing statistics correct to the end of 1899.

Leo Vincent Rankin (8 October 1879 – 10 May 1917) was an Australian rules footballer who played with Melbourne in the Victorian Football League (VFL).

== Family ==
The son of John Rankin (1844–1916), and Mary Rankin, née Donoghue, Leo Vincent Rankin was born at East Melbourne, Australia on 8 October 1879.

== Education ==
He attended Xavier College.

== Football ==
He played in one match for Melbourne, against Carlton, on 9 September 1899.

Along with two other "single game players" — Joe Finlay and Arthur Sinclair — he was used to make up the numbers, when regular players Jack Davidson, Maurie Herring, Eddie Sholl, Dick Wardill, and Alf Wood were all unavailable.

== Military service ==
He enlisted for service in the First AIF on 8 December 1915, and served overseas in the 55th Battalion.

== Death ==
He died of hepatitis on 10 May 1917 at the Military Hospital in Wareham, Dorset, United Kingdom, and was buried in the military cemetery of the Lady St Mary Church, Wareham.

== See also ==
- List of Victorian Football League players who died on active service
