= Henry Forrest =

Henry Forrest may refer to:

- Henry Forrest (martyr) (died 1533), Scottish martyr
- Henry Forrest (racehorse trainer) (1907–1975), American racehorse trainer
- Henry Garnet Forrest (1895–1945), Australian-born aviator
