= Joseph Strong =

Joe or Joseph Strong may refer to:

- Joe Strong (Negro leagues pitcher), Negro leagues baseball pitcher
- Joe Strong (baseball, born 1962), American Major League Baseball pitcher
- Joseph Strong (politician), politician in Newfoundland
- Joseph Dwight Strong, American artist and illustrator
- Joe Strong (footballer), Australian rules footballer
