= Gorsuch (surname) =

Gorsuch is a surname of English origin. The name is a habitational name, named after the hamlet of Gorsuch (earlier, Gosefordsich) in Lancashire. The name is derived from the Old English Gosford ("goose ford") + sic ("small stream").

== People named Gorsuch ==
- Anne Gorsuch Burford (1942–2004), administrator of the Environmental Protection Agency, United States
- Dave Gorsuch (1938–2021), American skier at the 1960 Winter Olympics
- Dick Gorsuch (1878–1934), Australian rules footballer
- Harry Gorsuch (fl. 1978–1986), American actor
- John Gorsuch (fl. 1430s), English academic; see List of Vice-Chancellors of the University of Oxford
- Neil Gorsuch (born 1967), Associate Justice of the Supreme Court of the United States
- Thomas Gorsuch (died 1896), American politician from Maryland
