= Busbridge (surname) =

Busbridge is a surname. Notable people with the surname include:

- Bill Busbridge (1885–1943), Australian rules footballer
- Ida Busbridge (1908–1988), British mathematician
- Norm Busbridge (1887–1953), Australian rules footballer
- Phil Busbridge (1920–1975), Australian rules footballer
