= Jack Mulcahy =

Jack Mulcahy is the name of:

- Jack Mulcahy (actor) (born 1954), American actor
- Jack Mulcahy (footballer) (1876–1950), Australian rules footballer with Fitzroy
- Jack Mulcahy (hurler) (1918–1962), Irish hurler
