= Bob Rush =

Bob Rush may refer to:

- Bob Rush (American football) (born 1955), center for San Diego and Kansas City
- Bob Rush (Australian footballer) (1880–1975), VFL footballer and administrator at Collingwood
- Bob Rush (baseball) (1925–2011), Major League pitcher from 1948 to 1960
- Bobby Rush (born 1946), politician from South Side Chicago
- Bobby Rush (musician) (born 1940), American blues and R&B musician, composer and singer
