= Alan Sinclair =

Alan Sinclair may refer to:

- Alan Sinclair (rower) (born 1985), British rower
- Alan Sinclair (footballer) (1900–1972), Australian rules footballer
- Alan Sinclair (scientist) (born 1952), clinical scientist and diabetes specialist

== See also ==
- Allan Sinclair, Australian rules footballer
