= Victoria Park, Melbourne =

Football stadium in Melbourne, Australia

Victoria Park
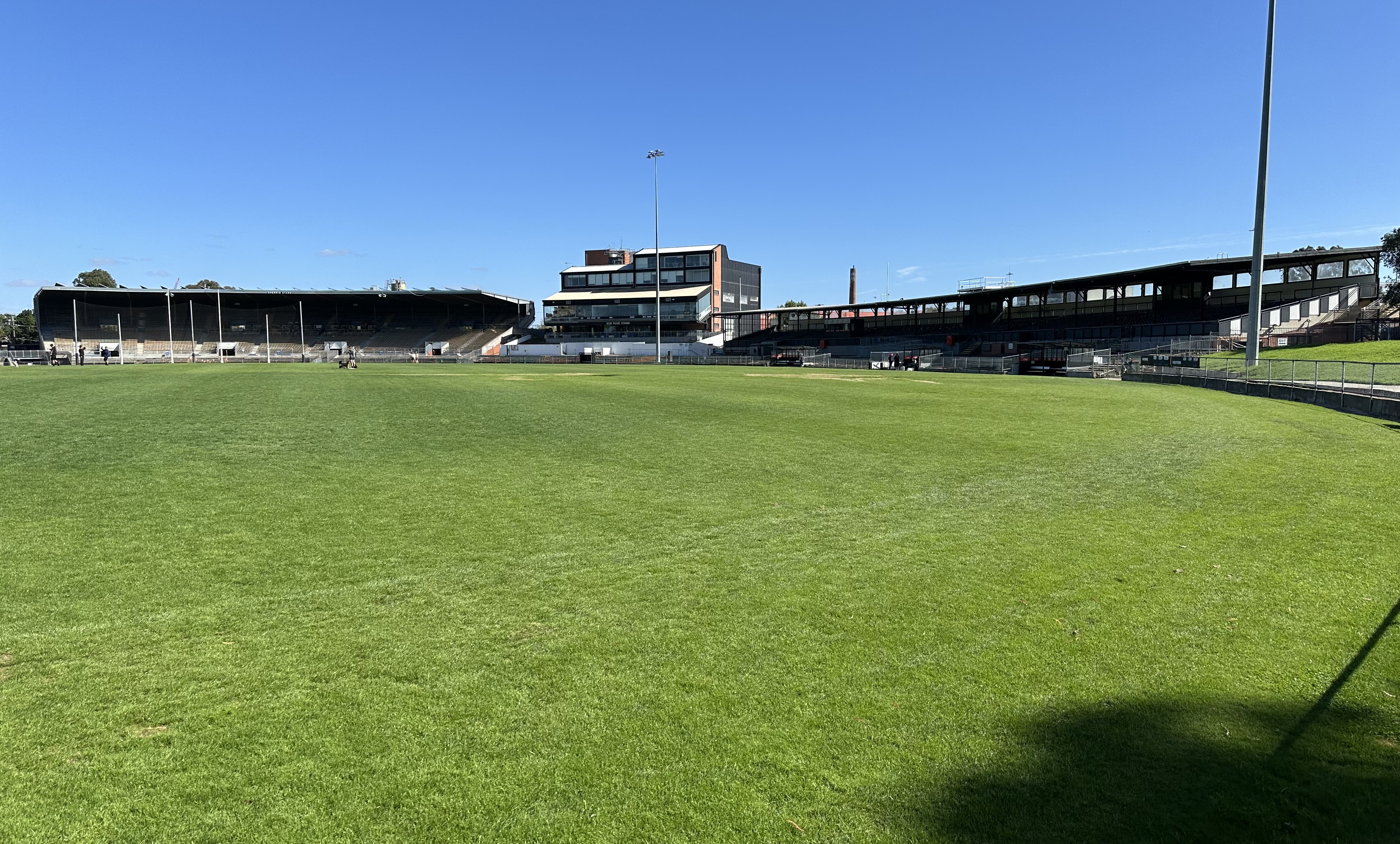
- Victoria Park in April 2026
- Interactive map of Victoria Park
- Former names: Dight's Paddock; Jock McHale Stadium
- Location: Abbotsford, Victoria
- Coordinates: 37°47′54″S 144°59′47″E
- Owner: City of Yarra
- Operator: City of Yarra
- Capacity: 10,000 (formerly 27,000)

Construction
- Opened: 1879; 147 years ago
- Cost: £600
- Architect: William Pitt

Tenants
- Collingwood Football Club: Administration & Training (1892–2004); VFL/AFL (1892–1999); VFL (2010–present); AFLW (2018–present); VFLW (2018–present); Other teams: Britannia Football Club (1882–1892); Fitzroy Football Club (VFL) (1985–1986); Fitzroy Stars (NFL) (2010–2012); Collingwood Warriors (NSL) (1996–1997)

Victoria Park is an Australian rules football venue in the Melbourne suburb of Abbotsford. It is the historical home ground of the Collingwood Football Club in the Australian Football League (AFL), which played senior men's matches at the ground from 1892 until 1999 and retained the ground as an administrative and training base until 2004.

At its peak, Victoria Park was the third largest of the suburban VFL stadiums (after the Melbourne Cricket Ground and Princes Park). However, in the 1990s, the AFL's ground consolidation policy forced clubs away from their traditional home grounds and Collingwood played their last AFL game there in 1999. The club continued to use Victoria Park as a training and administration base up until 2004. Since then, the venue has continued to host matches in the AFL Women's (AFLW), Victorian Football League (VFL) and VFL Women's (VFLW).

The ground is listed on the Victorian Heritage Register and is of state heritage significance.

== History ==
=== Dight's Paddock ===
Victoria Park was established in 1879 on Dight's Paddock by Frederick Trenerry Brown and David Abbot as part of the planned Campbellfield Estate. The twelve hectares of land that was known as "Dight's Paddock" until its sale was used as cattle agistments from 1838 when the land was sold at auction in Sydney. In 1878 Fred Brown arranged for his uncle Edwin Trenerry to send him £12,000 to be used to purchase the 12-hectare (30-acre) paddock. Edwin Trenerry was a resident of Cornwall, UK. In 1882 the land was given to the citizens of Collingwood for their "resort and recreation". A cricket pitch and cycling track were installed and the ground was used by the Capulet Cricket Club and local junior football clubs.

=== Collingwood Football Club ===
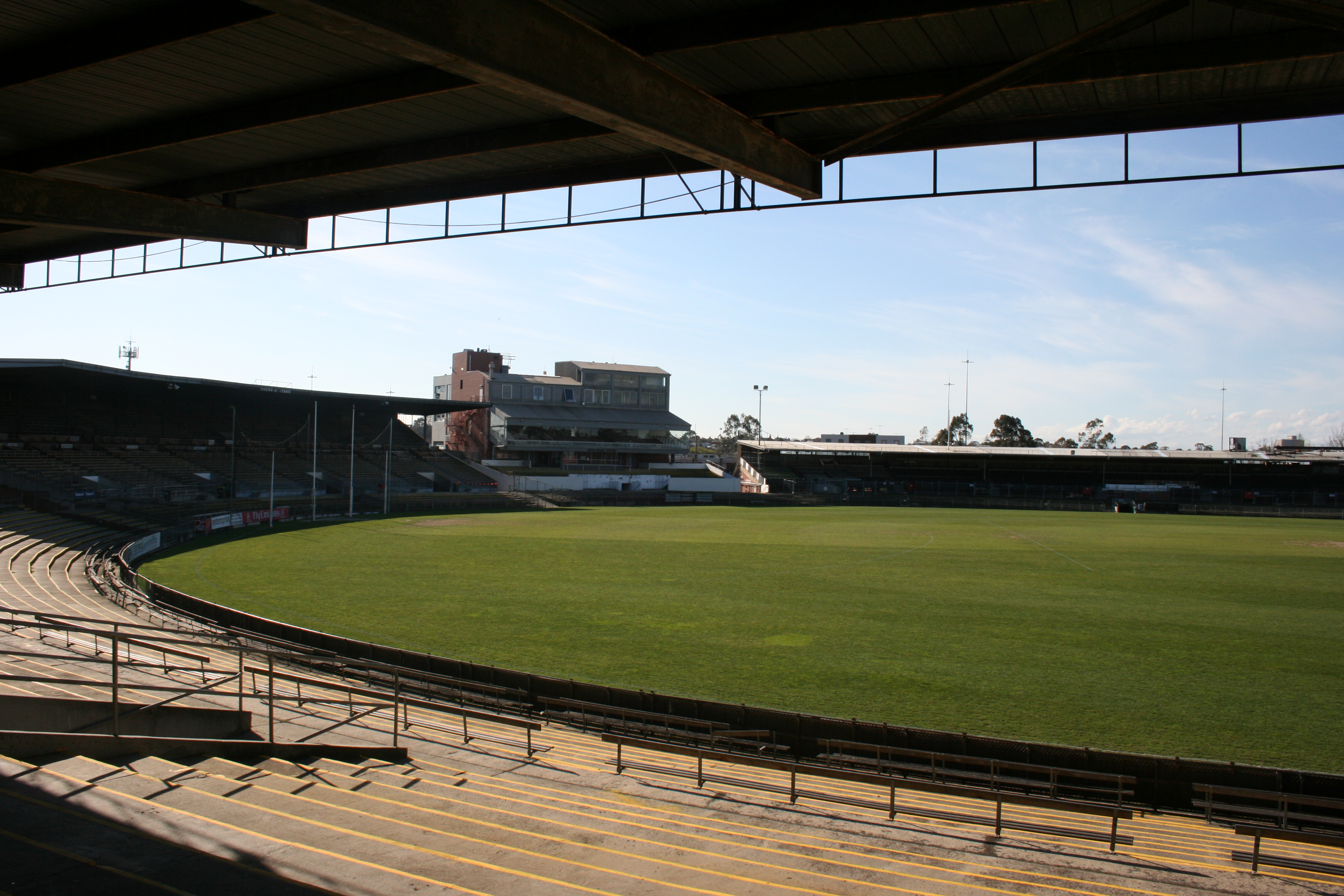
The Sherrin, Bob Rose and Ryder Stands in 2007

The first game at Victoria Park was witnessed by an estimated 16,000 spectators and although Collingwood lost, it signalled the popularity and drawing power of the Collingwood Football Club and Victoria Park.

The first major stand was completed midway through the 1892 season and it was not long before the club was back at the town hall asking the council to fund the construction of further facilities to accommodate the enormous following the club generated. In 1900, the Ladies Stand was constructed, and in 1909 architect Thomas Watt designed the Member's Stand. The Ladies Stand, on the ground's north side along Abbott Street, was pulled down in 1929 to make way for the Jack Ryder Stand. This grandstand would provide state-of-the-art facilities for players of both the Collingwood Football and Cricket Clubs and also seated approximately 3,000 supporters. The Ryder Stand was designed by architects Peck and Kemter. The steel-framed concrete stand with cantilevered roof was named after cricketer Jack Ryder.

By the end of the 1929 season Collingwood had completed the third premiership of the record-breaking four in a row. The team was perceived to be invincible at Victoria Park and all rival clubs dreaded travelling there. This was in stark contrast to the prevailing economic conditions as the suburb was one of the hardest hit by the Great Depression. For many in the area, to see the Magpies win at Victoria Park was the only relief from melancholy of daily life on the unemployment queue; the football club offered sustenance workers free entry to games during this period.

The park's record attendance was set in April 1948, when 47,000 spectators witnessed Collingwood defeat South Melbourne.

In 1953, Collingwood won its first football premiership since 1936. With this success as a springboard, Collingwood secretary, Gordon Carlyon, started negotiations with the Collingwood council to provide for further improvements to the ground. The maximum seven-year leases granted by local governments did not give the football club enough security of tenure to proceed with the grand plans that were being laid down. Carlyon was unsuccessful on several approaches to council until a technicality was found in the Local Council's Act. Clause 237 allowed Collingwood to take a long-term lease over the ground provided the club agreed to provide for major improvements to the site. Carlyon first approached the council in 1955, but they voted 14–1 against the proposal. The following year Carlyon sharpened his approach and took a new, even better plan to the council and once again the council voted 8–7 against. Carlyon asked one of the dissenting councillors why he voted against the proposal and was surprised to discover that seven of the eight councillors were concerned that they would lose their free entry to Collingwood home games if the football club took control of the ground. Within weeks Carlyon returned to the council with the very same proposal and a handful of social club memberships which turned the vote 14–1 in favour and Collingwood was then set up with control of its own home ground until 1996.

=== Ground improvements ===
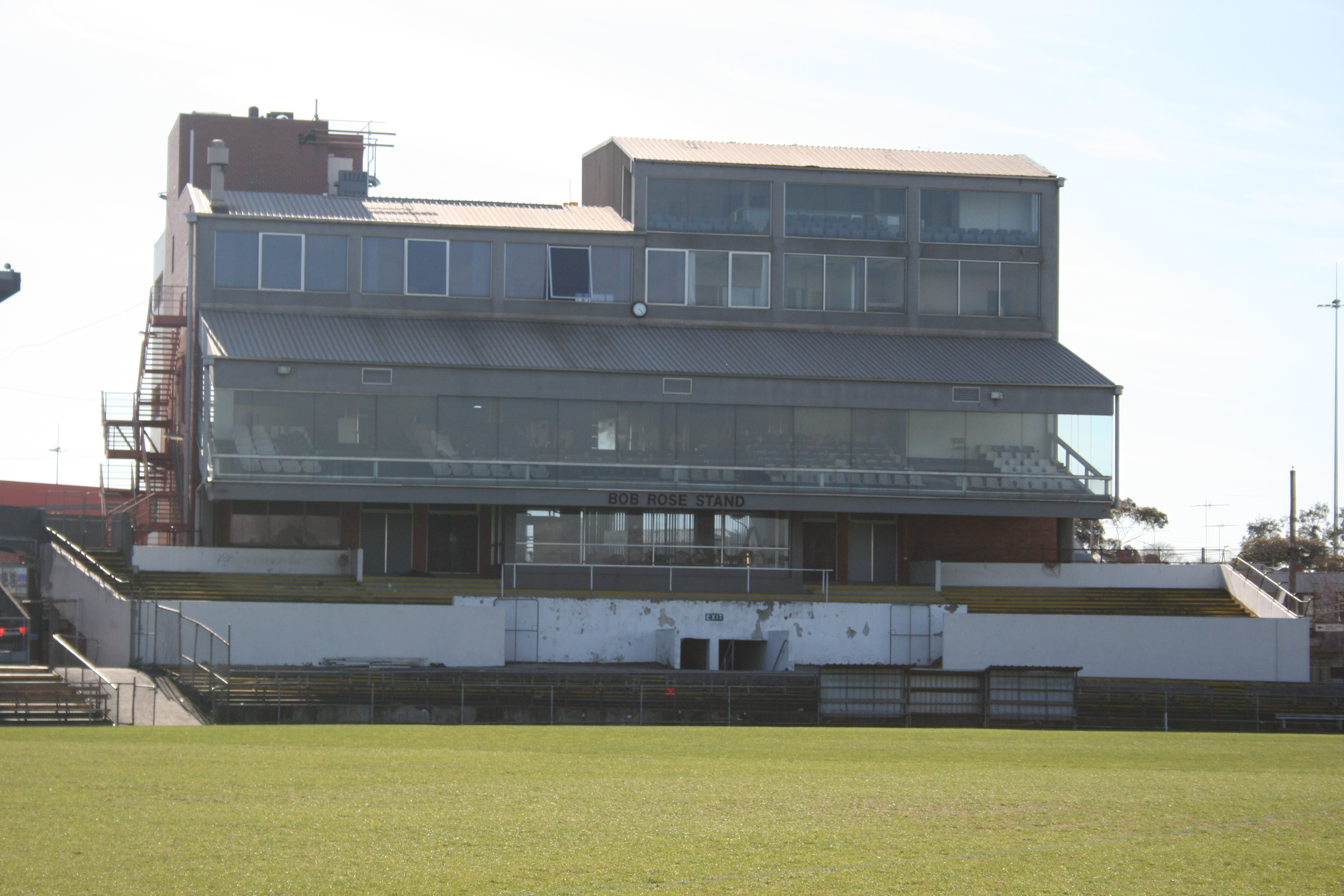
The Bob Rose Stand in 2009

The social club, now known as the Bob Rose Stand, was the first to be completed. It was opened in 1959 by the state governor, Sir Dallas Brooks. The next stand to go up was the R.T. Rush stand in 1965 (opened in 1966), named after former premiership player and club administrator Bob Rush. This allowed fans to have a significantly better view than the old open concrete terrace and hill. The old Member's Stand built in 1909 was pulled down to make way for the Sherrin Stand in 1969. Only two thirds were completed and the final third of the Sherrin Stand was finished in 1978.

Right up to the late 1980s work continued to upgrade and modernise the facilities at the ground and the plans were laid down to create further covered seated areas for patrons as pressure was placed on the club by the new nationally based competition to abandon the ground and relocate to the MCG. Local residents objected to the new plans. The club secured approval from the council, but after the election that followed, the new councillors retracted that support and would not allow the club to continue work on the development of the site.

=== Fitzroy Football Club (1985–1986) ===
The venue also served as the primary home ground of the Fitzroy Football Club in 1985 and 1986, after the club moved their home games from Junction Oval to Victoria Park, sharing the venue with Collingwood Football Club. In 1987, The Fitzroy Football Club moved their home games to Princes Park, sharing the ground with Carlton Football Club.

=== Winding down ===
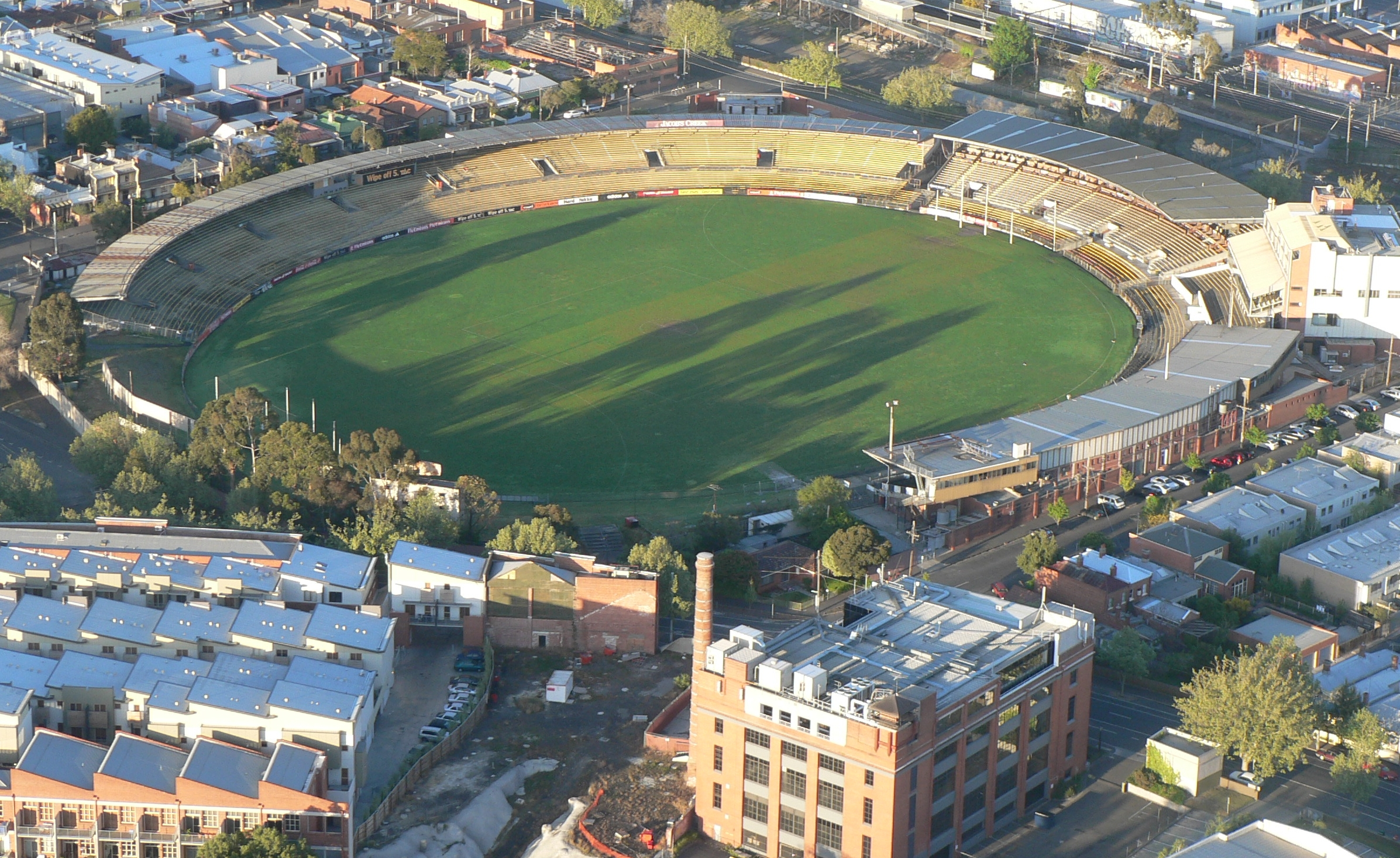
Victoria Park in 2007

Starting in the late 1980s, Collingwood started moving some of their home games to the MCG.

The move was a success financially for the club, as it unlocked better exposure to the public: these venues had light towers enabling games to be played at night to boost television audiences and attendances. Beginning in 1994, Collingwood started moving their games to the MCG by playing all but three matches at the venue, and in 1998 and 1999, only two games a year were being played at Victoria Park. In 1996 the cricket club moved away from the ground after a 100-year association with it.

The 928th and final match of top-level senior football (48 in the VFA and 880 in the VFL/AFL) at Victoria Park was played in the final round of the 1999 home-and-away season between Collingwood and the Brisbane Lions. Collingwood lost the final game at Victoria Park to Brisbane by 42 points, and finished with the wooden spoon for just the second time in their history.

While Collingwood were scaling down their presence at Victoria Park, the Victorian Football Association (VFA) staged their 1994 and 1995 finals series at the ground. The last VFA/VFL match of the era was played in 2000, when Collingwood lost to Williamstown. The ground's capacity at closing was around 27,000, significantly smaller than the other venues used by the AFL at the time.

=== Collingwood's departure ===
Following the move to the MCG, Collingwood has seen an increased number of spectators see their games, thanks to the much larger capacity of the stadium. After the use of the ground was discontinued for AFL home and away games at the end of the 1999 AFL season. Collingwood Football Club still continued to use Victoria Park as a training and administration base up until 2005. Collingwood also used Victoria Park for their training sessions leading into the 2002 and 2003 AFL Grand Final matches. The ground was also used for some of the pre-season matches prior to the 2004 AFL season. The ground is still considered to be the club's spiritual home. Collingwood Football Club moved its administrative and training facilities from Victoria Park to the purpose-built Melbourne Sports and Entertainment Centre at the Olympic Park Complex in 2004.

=== Recent use ===
In 2009, Yarra City Council voted to allow Collingwood's VFL team to recommence matches at Victoria Park. More than 6,000 spectators watched Collingwood's return to the ground in round 1 of the 2010 VFL season.

The team currently splits their home games between Victoria Park and Olympic Park Oval. By 2019, Collingwood were also playing most home matches for its women's teams in the AFL Women's and VFL Women's leagues at the venue, ensuring widespread use of Victoria Park by the club.

The ground has also been the base for the AFL Victoria umpiring department, which officiates "competitions, carnivals and other events, including the VFL and TAC Cup competitions".

=== Redevelopment ===
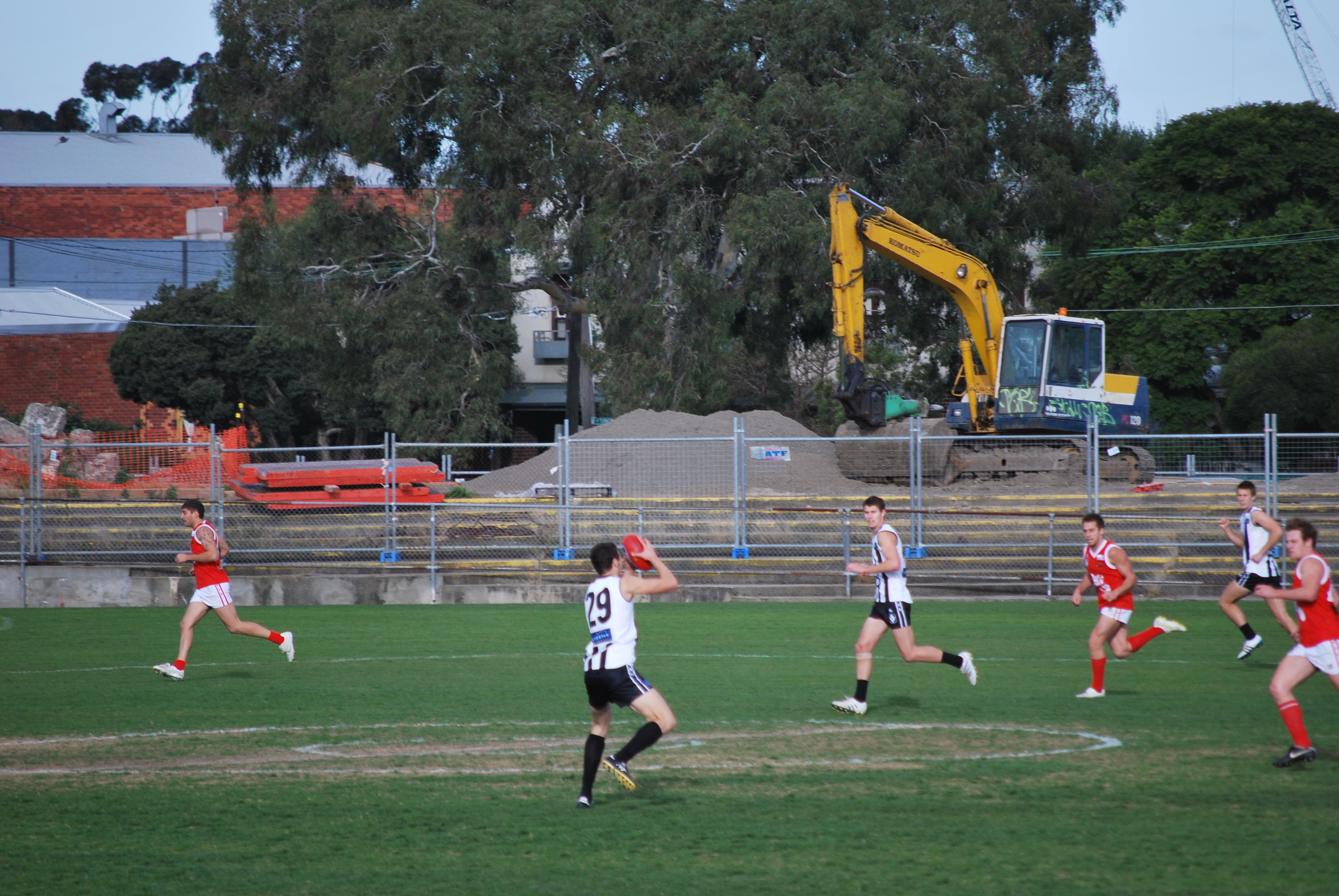
Victoria Park in June 2011 during the demolishment of the R.T. Rush Stand

In May 2010, Yarra City Council announced a $7.2 million upgrade of Victoria Park, to transform the park into a major community recreation space. At least $7.2 million was spent on the redevelopment, including $5.0 million contributed by the Australian Football League and the Collingwood Football Club, while the Australian government contributed $3.5 million.

The redevelopment works included:

- Creation of two public plazas – one at the entry of Bath and Turner streets and the other at Turner and Lulie streets. This landscaping will include the planting of trees and the installation of new seating and public barbecues
- Refurbishment of the external areas of the Sherrin, Ryder and Bob Rose stands
- Removal of 40 metres of the red brick wall along Lulie Street (from the corner of Turner Street to the south end of the Sherrin Stand)
- Reducing the walls along Turner Street to 600 millimetres at the footpath (with new walls tiering up to meet the internal terracing)
- Construction of a replica ticket box, and refurbishment of an existing ticket box
- Creation of public artworks which will celebrate the park's special history
- Installation of a disability compliant ramp on the eastern end of the Ryder stand, to help provide access into the ground for people with disabilities
- Construction of a walking path around the outside of the oval, and replacement of the boundary fence around the oval.

The works were completed in 2011 and the revitalised ground was opened at a community event on 4 December 2011.

=== Women's football upgrades ===
In May 2020 a $2 million upgrade to some of Victoria Park's facilities commenced, financed by the Victorian Government, City of Yarra, AFL and Collingwood. The Sherrin Stand was refurbished and suitable changing rooms and recovery facilities were constructed for the club's female footballers, allowing the women's teams to base themselves at the ground. The upgrade was completed in time for the 2021 season.

== Structure ==
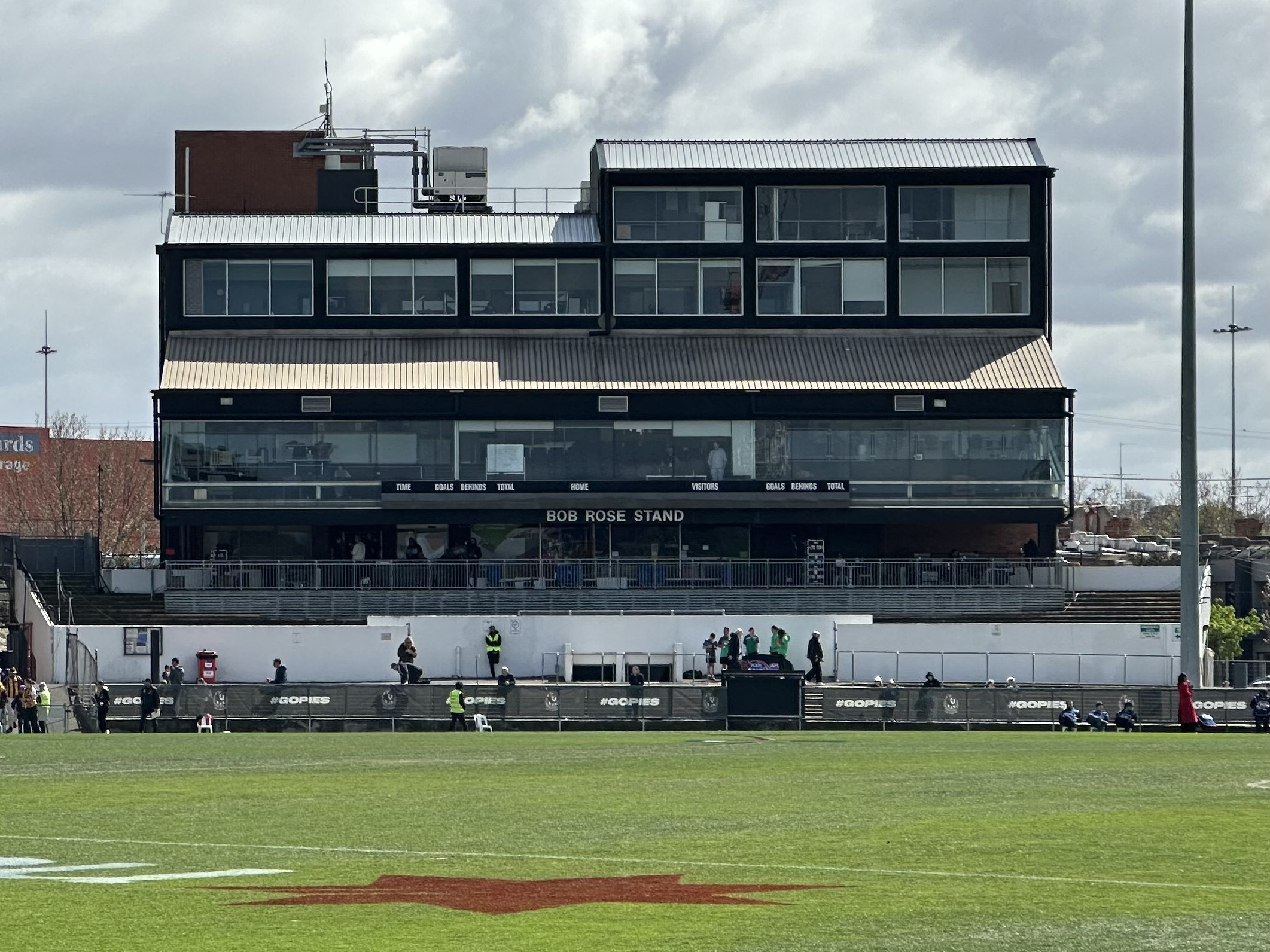
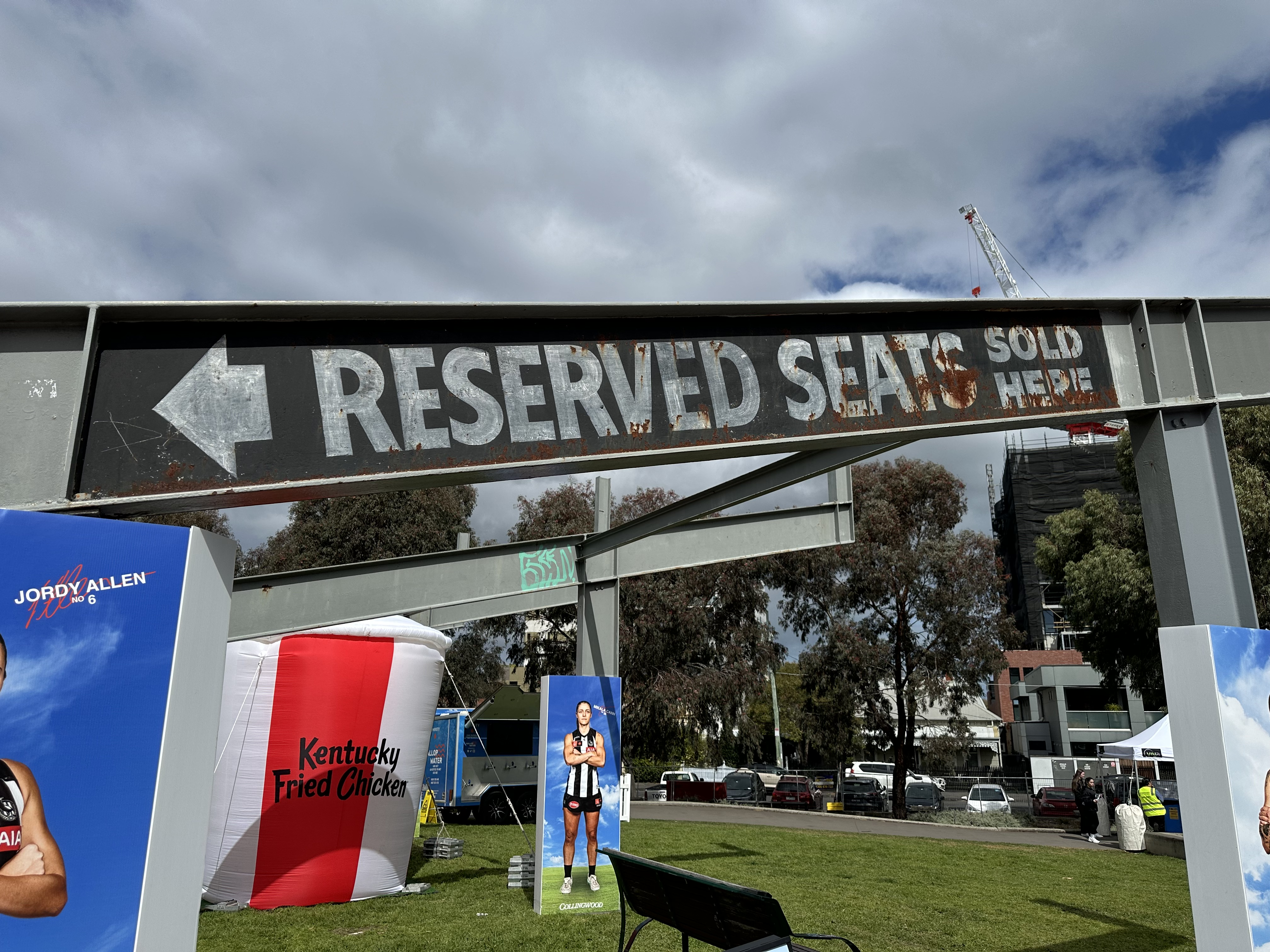
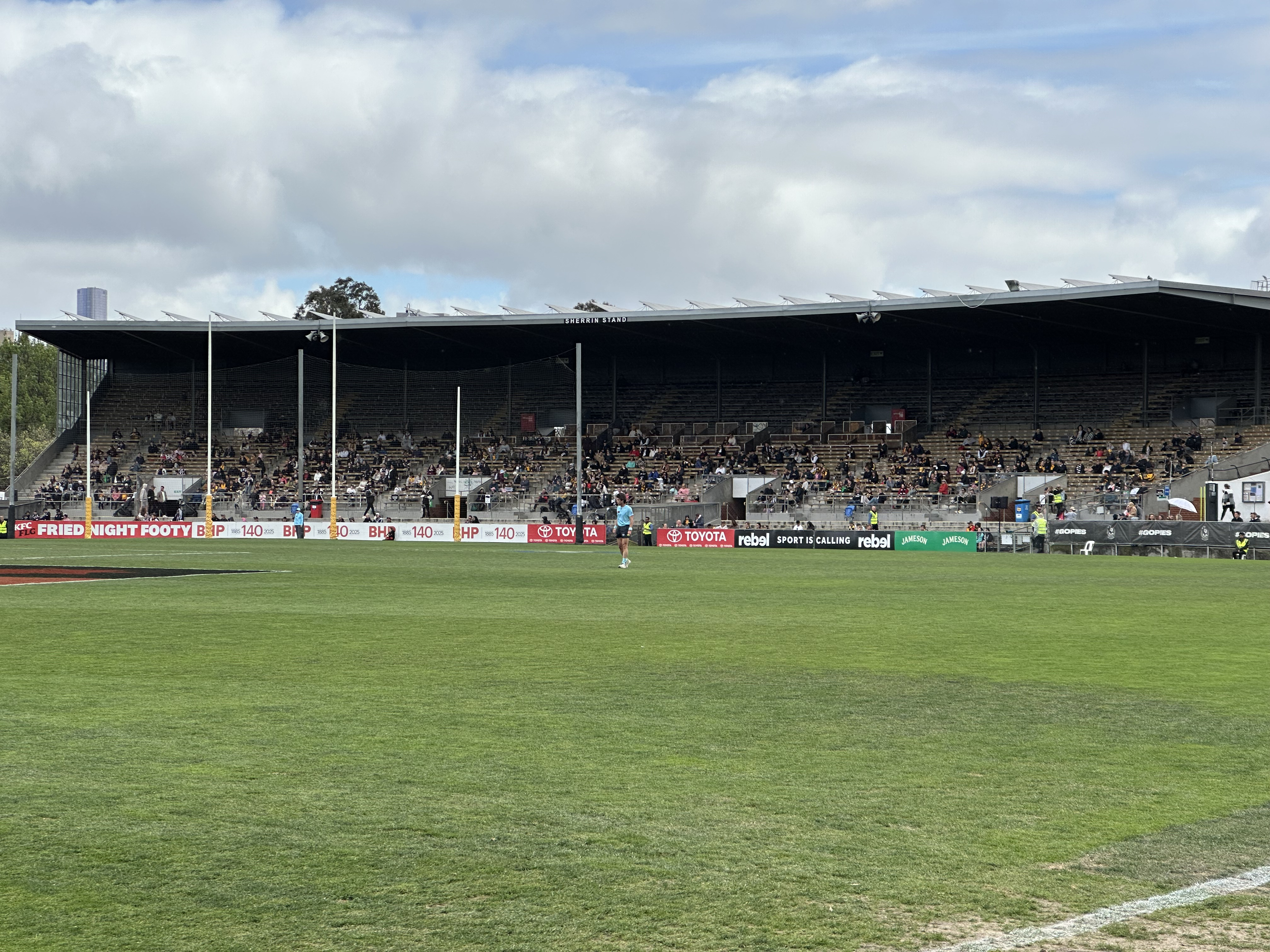
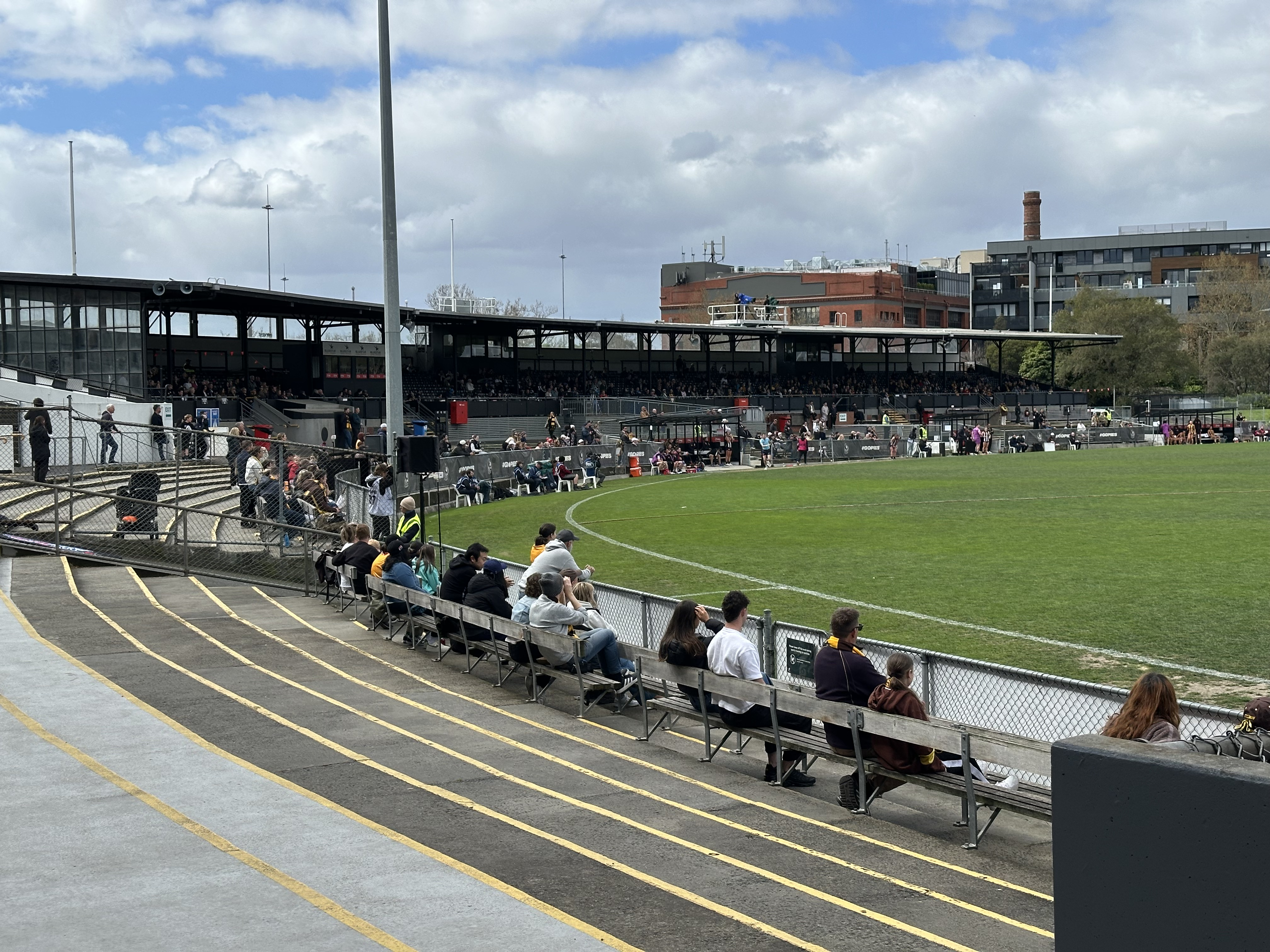
The Bob Rose Stand (top left), remaining frames of the R.T. Rush Stand (top right), the Sherrin Stand (bottom left) and the Ryder Stand (bottom right), as seen during the 2025 AFL Women's season

The interior of Victoria Park is shaped in an oval, almost a circle, to fit with the boundaries of the playing field. Whilst there were no large display devices set up at the ground during its existence, one was set up via crane for the final AFL game, and temporary display devices are used during AFLW matches.

The ground is made up of several grandstands:

- Bob Rose Stand: Opened in 1959 as the S.A. Coventry Pavilion after club champion and then-president Syd Coventry, the stand has undergone several internal and external changes to eventually become the Bob Rose Stand. This made up Collingwood's social club and administration base until 2004. Most of the spectator room was standing room only on concrete with some seats inside the social club on the second floor. Administration was on the third floor, above the social club.
- R.T. Rush Stand: Completed in 1965 this grandstand was the first of its kind for a suburban ground in that it had a cantilevered roof, which meant there were no pylons restricting some of the patrons view of the oval. The grandstand spanned the entire 'outer' on the southern side of Victoria Park from the Sherrin Stand around to the corner of Bath Street and Turner Street. This stand was demolished in 2011 with just a small piece of frame left remaining as a token of its existence.
- Sherrin Stand: This area was reserved mostly for the Collingwood cheer squad and other Collingwood members. It is located behind the goals and is on the right hand side of the Bob Rose Stand. The stand is partially under cover with several rows of seats from the fence in the open. All but the two rows of seats against the fence were removed in 2008.
- Ryder Stand: Completed at the end of the 1929 season, this stand was built by sustenance workers from Collingwood as way of elevating the desperate poverty and unemployment that plague Collingwood from the mid 1920s. The seating is wooden and later had some plastic seating corporate boxes installed at the front of the grandstand. It is located on the left hand side of the Bob Rose Stand and opposite the R.T. Rush Stand. This stand is completely under cover and was restored in 2010/2011.

The eastern end of ground did not have a stand in place, just grass and a scoreboard that was demolished in 2011. This was for standing room. No lighting for the playing field was built and therefore the venue did not host night games once they were introduced. Some lights were installed for darker day games to support the player's vision. Entry into the ground was by a staffed turnstile and could be made from all stands.

Austadiums lists the capacity of the ground at 10,000. The ground record crowd for the oval was set on 26 April 1948 when 47,224 turned out to see Collingwood defeat South Melbourne by 53 points.

== Transport access ==
The ground is located about 4 km to the northeast of the Melbourne central business district. The ground had limited parking space on match days which has now been made unavailable now that the ground is unused. The ground has its own railway station about 200 metres from the ground, situated on the Hurstbridge and Mernda lines.
