= Pat Fitzgerald (disambiguation) =

Pat Fitzgerald is an American college football coach

Pat Fitzgerald may also refer to:

- Pat Fitzgerald (footballer, born 1874) (1874–1903), Australian footballer for Collingwood
- Pat Fitzgerald (footballer, born 1936), Australian footballer for Footscray
- Pat Fitzgerald (hurler) (1881–1970), Irish hurler

== See also ==
- Patrick Fitzgerald (disambiguation)
