= Roby Manuel =

Australian fighter pilot

Roby Lewis Manuel
- Born: 7 October 1895; Kerang, Victoria, Australia
- Died: 18 October 1975 (aged 80)
- Military career
- Allegiance: Australia
- Branch: Australian Imperial Force (1916–17); Australian Flying Corps (1917–19); Royal Australian Air Force (c.1940–47)
- Service years: 1916–1919 c. 1940–1947
- Rank: Flight Lieutenant
- Unit: No. 2 Squadron AFC
- Conflicts: First World War; Second World War
- Awards: Distinguished Flying Cross & Bar

Roby Lewis Manuel, DFC & Bar, (7 October 1895 – 18 October 1975) was an Australian flying ace of the First World War credited with 12 official aerial victories. He led the Anzac Day flyby in London in 1919. At the beginning of the Second World War, Manuel joined the Royal Australian Air Force and once again served his nation.

== Early life ==
Roby Lewis Manuel was born in Kerang on 7 October 1895.

== First World War ==
Manuel enlisted in the 43rd Battalion, Australian Imperial Force on 5 April 1916. He swore that he was a natural born British citizen, that he worked as a farmer, and that his uncle, Frederick George Jones, was his next of kin. Manuel claimed a year's prior militia experience.

He transferred to the Australian Flying Corps on 30 April 1917. He was posted to No. 2 Squadron AFC in France as a Royal Aircraft Factory SE.5a pilot on 6 February 1918. He scored his first aerial victory on 2 April 1918, in company with Captain Henry Garnet Forrest; they destroyed a German two-seater reconnaissance machine over Demuin. Two months later, on 2 June, he destroyed two Pfalz D.III fighter planes, then drove down a third one out of control within the half hour. Ten days later, on 12 June 1918, he became an ace by setting another Pfalz D.III afire north of Bussy. His exploits earned him the award of a Distinguished Flying Cross (DFC) on 2 July 1918.

Manuel was then promoted to captain as he was appointed a Flight Commander. He switched airplanes. He had scored his first five wins in serial number B184; he would use number C1948 for his final seven victories. He began on 22 July 1918, driving down a Pfalz D.III and a Fokker D.VII, both out of control. On the 31st, he drove down an Albatros D.V. The destruction of a Fokker D.VII on an evening patrol on 14 August 1918 brought Manuel's total to nine wins.

On 16 September, Manuel claimed two more Fokker D.VIIs in two separate dogfights. When the second Fokker went down near Droglandt, France, Manuel landed nearby. Unable to aid the German pilot he had wounded, Manuel could only watch him die, then help bury the dead German. This action won the doughty Australian a Bar for his DFC in lieu of a second award of the medal. British military intelligence later exhumed this German pilot's body to examine the parachute he was wearing.

== Post-war ==
Manuel led the flypast on Anzac Day in London in 1919.

Manuel returned to service in the Royal Australian Air Force during the Second World War. He volunteered the use of his private airplane to his nation, and his services as a pilot. He was not accepted for flying duty because of his age; instead, he was assigned to administrative duties.

Manuel returned once again to farming, and would continue to foster aviation in northern Australia; he flew until shortly before his death. In 1968, it was noted that he was still flying his own light aircraft.

He died on 18 October 1975.

== Honors and awards ==
Text of the citation for Manuel's Distinguished Flying Cross:

Lt. Roby Lewis Manuel (Australian Flying Corps) During the past month, whilst on an offensive patrol, his machine was badly damaged in an encounter with an enemy aeroplane which he brought down out of control. On his return home he saw another enemy machine below him. At great personal risk, owing to the state of his machine, he nevertheless attacked and brought it down. He is a most skilful pilot of great determination.

Text of the citation for Manuel's Bar to the Distinguished Flying Cross:

Lieut. (A./Capt.) Roby Lewis Manuel On many occasions this officer has led his patrol with exceptional ability and courage, notably on 16 September, when, with a patrol of eleven machines, he engaged fifteen hostile aircraft. By skilful manoeuvre he completely defeated the enemy in a combat that only lasted twenty minutes, at the expiration of which period only four hostile machines remained in the air, and these retired. Six of the enemy machines were seen to fall in a manner that would justify the supposition that they would crash.

Roby Lewis Manuel is also memorialized at Atkinson Park in his home town of Kerang.
