= Joe Lowrey (disambiguation) =

Joe Lowrey (1879– 1948) was an Australian rules footballer.

== See also ==
- Jo Lawry, Australian singer and musician
- Joseph Lowery (1921–2020), American minister and civil rights leader
- Joseph Wilson Lowry (1803–1879), English engraver
