= George Mudie =

George Mudie may refer to:

- George Mudie (politician) (born 1945), politician in the United Kingdom
- George Mudie (cricketer) (1915–2002), West Indian cricketer
- George Mudie (social reformer) (1788–?), Scottish publisher and Owenite

== See also ==
- George Moody (born 1942), Canadian politician
- George Moodie (1872–1954), Australian rules player
