= Patrick Fitzgerald (disambiguation) =

Patrick Fitzgerald (born 1960) is the former United States Attorney for the Northern District of Illinois.

Patrick Fitzgerald may also refer to:

- Patrick Fitzgerald (Irish judge), Recorder of Dublin c.1599
- Patrick Fitzgerald (1882–1965), actor, stage name Creighton Hale
- Paddy Fitzgerald (1896–1984), Australian brewer
- Paddy FitzGerald (born 1939), Irish hurler and manager
- Patrik Fitzgerald (born 1956), British singer-songwriter
- Pat Fitzgerald (born 1974), football coach

== See also ==
- Pat Fitzgerald (disambiguation)
