= George Oliver (footballer) =

Australian rules footballer

Personal information
- Full name: George Charles Edward Oliver
- Born: 15 June 1883; Carlton, Victoria
- Died: 6 July 1964 (aged 81); Bendigo, Victoria
- Original team: Maldon
- Height: 177 cm (5 ft 10 in)

Playing career^{1}
Years	Club	Games (Goals)
1909	Melbourne	1 (0)
- ^{1} Playing statistics correct to the end of 1909.

George Charles Edward Oliver (15 June 1883 – 6 July 1964) was an Australian rules footballer who played with Melbourne in the Victorian Football League (VFL).

== Family ==
The son of Charles Edward Oliver, and Jane Oliver, née Carson, George Charles Edward Oliver was born in Carlton, Victoria on 15 June 1883.

His brothers Les and Norm played VFL football with Richmond and Collingwood respectively.
