= Bill Bowe =

Australian rules footballer

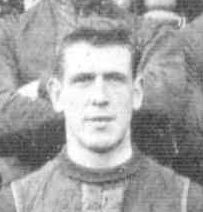

Personal information
- Full name: William Knox Bowe
- Born: 29 January 1879; Maldon, Victoria
- Died: 11 March 1920 (aged 41); Corowa, New South Wales
- Original team: Waterloo
- Position: Defence

Playing career^{1}
Years	Club	Games (Goals)
1900, 1902–03, 1905–06	Melbourne	74 (3)
- ^{1} Playing statistics correct to the end of 1906.

William Knox Bowe (29 January 1879 – 11 March 1920) was an Australian rules footballer who played with Melbourne in the Victorian Football League (VFL).
