= Janet Schuster =

Canadian Paralympic cross-country skier and physiotherapist

Personal information
- National team: Canada
- Born: c. 1961 Edmonton, Alberta, Canada
- Years active: 1975–1981

Sport
- Country: Canada
- Sport: Paralympic cross-country skiing
- Disability: Visual impairment
Medal record
Women's Paralympic cross-country skiing
Event	1st	2nd	3rd
Paralympic Games	0	0	1
Total	0	0	1
Representing Canada
Paralympic Games
Bronze medal – third place	1980 Geilo	women's 4 x 5-kilometre relay 5A-5B

Janet Schuster (born c. 1961) is a Canadian Paralympic cross-country skier and physiotherapist who has a visual impairment. She began skiing in 1975 and competitively from 1977. Schuster won the bronze medal in the women's 4 x 5-kilometre relay 5A-5B along with three other skiers at the 1980 Summer Paralympics in Geilo, Norway.

== Biography ==
Schuster was born c. 1961, and she comes from Edmonton, Alberta, Canada. She was born completely blind. She began learning to ski at William Hawrelak Park with her family in 1975 and started skiing competitively from 1977. Previously, Schuster solely skied as a hobby and she entered approximately ten events per year. She was first required to compete in the 18 to 30-year olds category when she was 16 years old. Schuster was guided by her brother for the first two years before Sidsel Bradley took over from him.

She finished first in the women's 18 to 30-year-old division race of the 1978 Canadian 'Ski in the Light' five-kilometre cross-country championships in Castlegar, British Columbia that February. Schuster went on to place second in the girls' 16 to 25-year-old class in the Alberta Blind Championship at Rundle Park in March 1978, and she was entered for the Invitational Meet in Beitostølen, Norway during the middle of the following month. She took part in the five-kilometre race of the Capital City Citizens' Cross-Country Ski Tour from the North Saskatchewan River to the ACT Aquatic and Recreation Centre in Rundle Park as one of eight blind skiers in February 1979.

Schuster was selected by the Canadian Association for Disabled Skiing to be on Canada's blind cross-country ski team that they would send to the 1980 Winter Paralympics in Geilo, Norway between February 1 and February 7, 1980. She trained in Banff, Alberta as preparation for the Games. At the Games, she took part in three events in cross-country skiing. Schuster finished ninth in each of the women's short distance 5-kilometre 5A and the women's middle distance 10-kilometre 5A competitions and took a bronze medal in the women's 4 x 5-kilometre relay 5A-5B event. She was named a winner of the Alberta Achievement Award in cross-country skiing for 1980.

In 1981, Schuster won the women's blind five kilometres event of the Alberta Provincial Ski Championships for the Visually Impaired with a time of 57:03. She enrolled at the University of Manitoba's School of Medical Rehabilitation and studied on its physiotherapy program that saw her join sighted classmates on federal funding and help from the Canadian National Institute for the Blind in what was reported to be the first fully integrated class of its kind at a North American university. This was to prevent Schuster from incurring high costs of enrolling on such programs in England. She completed one year at the school and did a stint working at a hospital. Following her graduation, she returned to Edmonton to work as a physiotherapist.
