= Little Barningham =

Village in Norfolk, England

Coordinates: 52.854°N 1.176°E

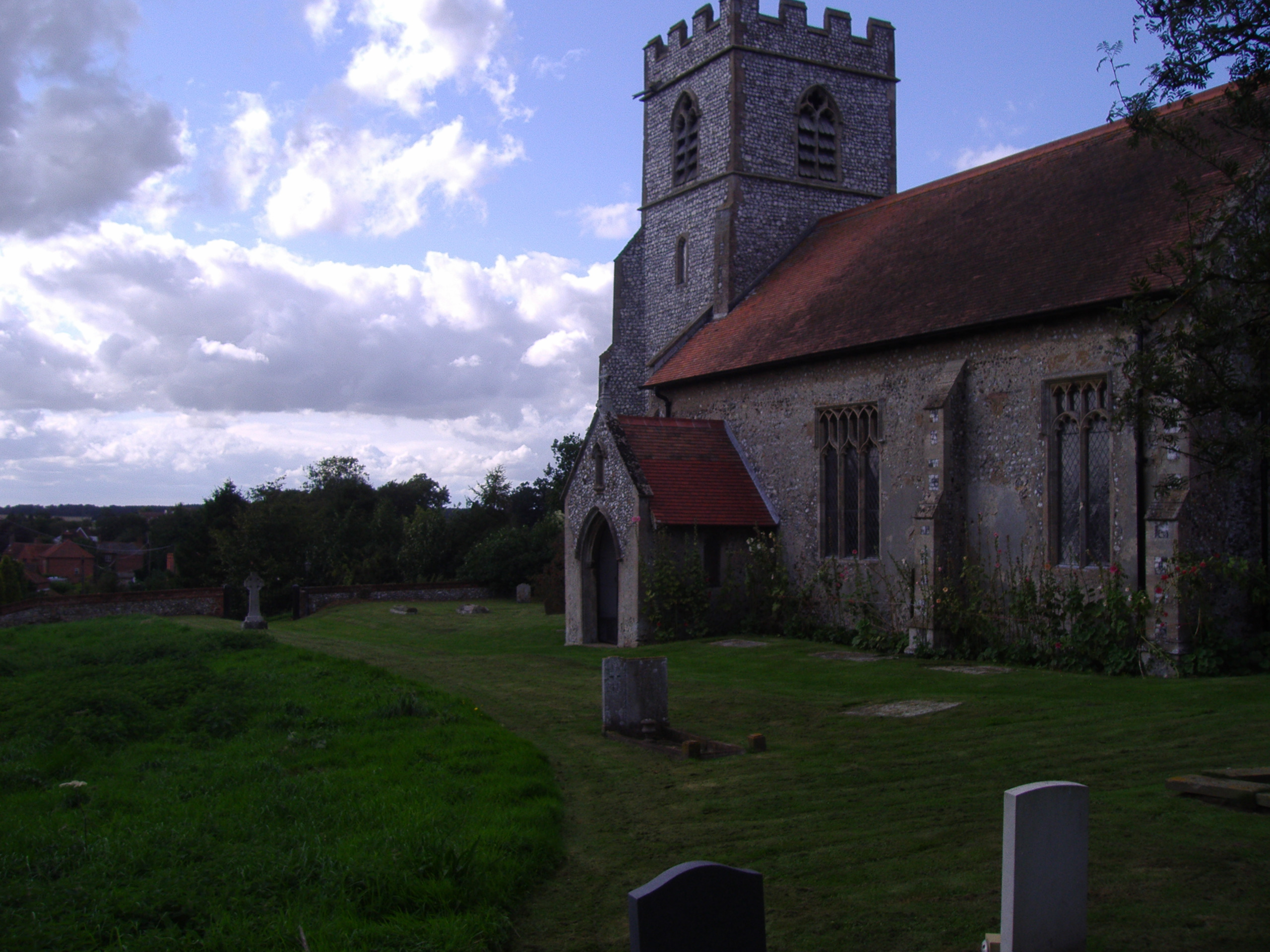
- St Andrew's Church

- Location within Norfolk
- Area: 1.95 sq mi (5.1 km^{2})
- Population: 124 (2021 census)
  - Density: 64/sq mi (25/km^{2})
- OS grid reference: TG130330
  - London: 133 miles (214 km)
- Civil parish: Little Barningham
- District: North Norfolk
- Shire county: Norfolk
- Region: East
- Country: England
- Sovereign state: United Kingdom
- Post town: NORWICH
- Postcode district: NR11
- Dialling code: 01263
- Police: Norfolk
- Fire: Norfolk
- Ambulance: East of England
- UK Parliament: North Norfolk

Little Barningham is a village and civil parish in the English county of Norfolk. It is 10 miles (16 km) south-west of Cromer and 19 miles (31 km) north of Norwich and includes the hamlet of Barningham Green.

== History ==
Little Barningham's name is of Anglo-Saxon origin. In the Domesday Book it is listed as a settlement of 31 households in the hundred of South Erpingham. In 1086, the village was divided between the East Anglian estates of King William I, William de Warenne, William de Beaufeu and Robert, son of Corbucion.

During the Second World War, parts of the parish became RAF Matlaske, a satellite airfield for RAF Coltishall. After the war, the airfield returned to agricultural use.

== Geography ==
According to the 2021 census, Little Barningham has a population of 124 people which shows an increase from the 111 people recorded in the 2011 census.

== St. Andrew's church ==
Little Barningham's parish church is dedicated to Saint Andrew and dates from medieval period, though it was heavily restored in the Nineteenth Century. St. Andrew's is located on 'The Street' and has been Grade II listed since 1960. The church is no longer open for Sunday service.

St. Andrew's features a rare boxed-pew with an elaborate woodern carving of Death on top which is dated from 1640. The carving is a replacement after the original was stolen in 1995.

== Governance ==
Little Barningham is part of the electoral ward of Gresham for local elections and is part of the district of North Norfolk.

The village's national constituency is North Norfolk, which has been represented by the Liberal Democrat Steff Aquarone MP since 2024.
