= Jack Denning =

Australian rules footballer

Personal information
- Full name: John Ryan Denning
- Born: 17 April 1875; Melbourne
- Died: 7 January 1949 (aged 73); Heidelberg, Victoria
- Original team: Perth
- Height: 182 cm (6 ft 0 in)
- Weight: 78 kg (172 lb)

Playing career^{1}
Years	Club	Games (Goals)
1899	Collingwood	2 (1)
- ^{1} Playing statistics correct to the end of 1899.

Jack Denning (17 April 1875 – 7 January 1949) was a former Australian rules footballer who played with Collingwood in the Victorian Football League (VFL). He later played with Brunswick in the Victorian Football Association (VFA).
