= Luke McFadyen =

- Born: November 17, 1982 Melbourne, Brunswick, Australia
- Occupation: Rugby player

Rugby union career
Senior career
Years	Team	Apps	(Points)
- Luton RFC
- Basingstoke RFC
International career
Years	Team	Apps	(Points)
	Malta	3	
National sevens team
Years	Team		Comps
	Malta		European 7's tournament (Lisbon)

Luke McFadyen (born 17 November 1982, Melbourne, Brunswick) is an international rugby player. He was the first Australian-born rugby player to represent Malta Rugby Union at the international level. He played in 3 test matches (vs. Serbia, Latvia and Luxembourg) to date and 1 European 7's tournament in Lisbon, Portugal (5 7's caps to date). He played for 2.5 years in England with Luton RFC and Basingstoke RFC.
