= Joe Archer =

Australian rules footballer

Personal information
- Full name: Joseph Archer
- Born: 20 May 1877; Diamond Creek, Victoria
- Died: 13 June 1969 (aged 92); Diamond Creek, Victoria
- Original team: Rovers

Playing career^{1}
Years	Club	Games (Goals)
1899	Carlton	4 (0)
- ^{1} Playing statistics correct to the end of 1899.

Joseph Archer (20 May 1877 – 13 June 1969) was an Australian rules footballer who played with Carlton in the Victorian Football League (VFL).

Although born in Victoria, Archer was recruited to Carlton from the Rovers Football Club of Western Australia, which played in what is now the West Australian Football League (WAFL). After leaving Carlton, he transferred to Essendon Town in the Victorian Football Association (VFA).
