= Wal Heron =

Australian rules footballer

Personal information
- Full name: Walter Cyril Heron
- Born: 16 May 1875; Hamilton, Victoria
- Died: 15 April 1936 (aged 60); Warragul, Victoria
- Original team: Albion United

Playing career^{1}
Years	Club	Games (Goals)
1899	St Kilda	1 (0)
- ^{1} Playing statistics correct to the end of 1899.

Walter Cyril Heron (16 May 1875 – 15 April 1936) was an Australian rules footballer who played with St Kilda in the Victorian Football League (VFL).
