= Albert Walsh (footballer) =

Australian rules footballer

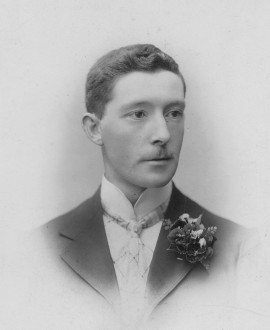
- Walsh in the early 1900s

Personal information
- Full name: Albert Victor Walsh
- Born: 31 January 1877; Footscray, Victoria
- Died: 21 June 1956 (aged 79); Fitzroy, Victoria
- Original team: Collingwood Juniors
- Height: 169 cm (5 ft 7 in)
- Weight: 66 kg (146 lb)

Playing career^{1}
Years	Club	Games (Goals)
1899–1900	Collingwood	2 (0)
- ^{1} Playing statistics correct to the end of 1900.

Albert Victor Walsh (31 January 1877 – 21 June 1956) was an Australian rules footballer who played for the Collingwood Football Club in the Victorian Football League (VFL).
