= Charles Raff =

Australian rules footballer

Personal information
- Full name: Charles James Raff
- Born: 9 October 1878; Carlton, Victoria
- Died: 4 August 1948 (aged 69); Coburg, Victoria
- Original team: Carlton Juniors / Parkville
- Position: half-back flank

Playing career^{1}
Years	Club	Games (Goals)
1899	St Kilda	5 (3)
1901	Carlton	3 (0)
Total		8 (3)
- ^{1} Playing statistics correct to the end of 1901.

Charles James Raff (9 October 1878 – 4 August 1948) was an Australian rules footballer who played with St Kilda and Carlton in the Victorian Football League (VFL).

== Family ==
The son of James Raff (1839–98), and Ellen Jane Raff (1848-1915), née Powell, Charles James Raff was born in Carlton, Victoria on 9 October 1878.

He married Lillian Crossan in 1910. They had one child, Norman Charles Raff (1918-)

== Football ==
=== St Kilda (VFL) ===
He played 5 games for St Kilda in 1899.

=== Carlton (VFL) ===
He played 3 games for Carlton in 1901. He was cleared from Carlton to Carlton Juniors in June 1901.

=== Preston (VFA) ===
Raff played four games for Preston Football Club (VFA) in the Victorian Football Association (VFA) in 1903.

== Death ==
He died at his home in Coburg, Victoria on 4 August 1948.
