= Harry Bond =

Australian rules footballer (1869–1946)

Personal information
- Full name: Henry James Bond
- Born: 27 May 1869; Boroondara
- Died: 27 November 1946 (aged 77); Bacchus Marsh
- Original team: Albert Park

Playing career^{1}
Years	Club	Games (Goals)
1899	St Kilda	2 (0)
- ^{1} Playing statistics correct to the end of 1899.

Henry James Bond (27 May 1869 – 27 November 1946) was an Australian rules footballer who played with St Kilda in the Victorian Football League (VFL).
