= Eddie Sholl =

Australian rules footballer

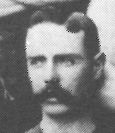

Personal information
- Full name: Edward Sholl
- Born: 15 April 1872; Melbourne
- Died: 29 June 1952 (aged 80); Fitzroy, Victoria
- Position: Fullback

Playing career^{1}
| Years | Club | Games (Goals) |
| 1890–1892 | North Melbourne (VFA) | 32 (2) |
| 1894–1896 | Melbourne (VFA) | 45 (2) |
| 1897–1902 | Melbourne | 50 (2) |
| Total | | 127 (6) |
- ^{1} Playing statistics correct to the end of 1902.

Career highlights
- VFL premiership player: 1900; Melbourne captain: 1899

Edward Sholl (15 April 1872 – 29 June 1952) was an Australian rules footballer who played for the Melbourne Football Club in the Victorian Football League (VFL).

Sholl played six games in the 1897 inaugural VFL season, three of which were finals.

He captained Melbourne in 1899 and in the same year represented Victoria in an interstate fixture against South Australia.

A fullback, he kept Gerald Brosnan goal-less in the 1900 VFL Grand Final, which Melbourne won.
