= Les Oliver =

Australian rules footballer

Personal information
- Full name: Leslie Rupert Oliver
- Born: 14 April 1890; Brunswick, Victoria
- Died: 12 March 1942 (aged 51); Bendigo, Victoria
- Original team: South Bendigo
- Height: 180 cm (5 ft 11 in)
- Weight: 70 kg (154 lb)
- Position: Centre

Playing career^{1}
| Years | Club | Games (Goals) |
| 1909–13, 1915 | Richmond | 50 (10) |
- ^{1} Playing statistics correct to the end of 1915.

Leslie Rupert Oliver (14 April 1890 – 12 March 1942) was an Australian rules footballer who played with Richmond in the Victorian Football League (VFL).

== Family ==
The son of Charles Edward Oliver, and Jane Oliver, née Carson, Leslie Rupert Oliver was born in Brunswick, Victoria on 14 April 1890.

His brothers George and Norm played VFL football with Melbourne and Collingwood respectively.

He married Vida Grenfell in 1914.

== Football ==
=== Richmond (VFL) ===
Recruited from the Castlemaine Foundry Football Club, he played his first match for Richmond, against St Kilda, at the Punt Road Oval, on 31 July 1909.

Les Oliver, who has bounced into prominence as one of the most brilliant players of the season, was born in Brunswick 23 years ago. He is one of the sturdiest players in the game, standing 5 feet 11 inches in his stockings, and tipping the scales at 12[stone]-2[pounds]. Before he had reached his teens his family had removed to Castlemaine and it was in the foundry team of Thomson and Co., where he was employed, that Oliver had his first games. Four years ago, he came to Richmond, but after a season he returned home and subsequently put in a year with South Bendigo. Last year he returned to the Richmond team, and his dashing performances since are fresh in the memory. He is easily, the fastest man playing in Melbourne football to-day. After winning big sprint handicaps at Bendigo and Maryborough this season, he was made a warm favorite for the Stawell Gift—the Grand Prix of Australian pedestrianism. He did not leave the holes as smartly as usual, and was beaten into third place in the final. If the race were run again Oliver would probably again start favorite and win. His three brothers were also very speedy. George Oliver, the eldest (Les. is the youngest of the four) was second in a Stawell Gift some years ago and Norman Oliver, who will be remembered as a star wing man: for Collingwood, was successful in the 1906 Shepparton Gift and other big events. Norman has given football up. Jim Oliver won a few events at the running grounds at Flemington. He is proprietor of a flourishing tailoring establishment—the American Suitery—and has the reputation of being one of the best cutters in Melbourne. He is now training with Richmond and shows considerable promise. The selection of Les Oliver for the Victorian team to meet South Australia next Saturday is a well-deserved tribute to his prowess as a player, and he will uphold the credit of the club and his State on and off the field. The Richmond Guardian, 5 July 1913.

== Athletics ==
Les won the 1920 Echuca Gift and ran third in the famous Stawell Gift on two occasions. In 1913 he ran off 12 and a half yards to E A George and in 1921 - he ran third off 7 and 3/4 yards to J Jennings.

== Death ==
He died of tuberculosis, at Bendigo, Victoria, on 12 March 1942.
