= Victor Rapp =

Australian rules footballer

Personal information
- Full name: Victor Emanuel Rapp
- Born: 27 April 1881; Essendon, Victoria
- Died: 3 July 1944 (aged 63); Moonee Ponds, Victoria
- Original team: North Melbourne Juniors

Playing career^{1}
Years	Club	Games (Goals)
1899	Carlton	1 (0)
- ^{1} Playing statistics correct to the end of 1899.

Victor Emanuel Rapp (27 April 1881 – 3 July 1944) was an Australian rules footballer who played with Carlton in the Victorian Football League (VFL).
