= Arthur Nickless =

Australian rules footballer

Personal information
- Full name: Arthur Ernest Nickless
- Born: 18 March 1879; Paddington, New South Wales
- Died: 12 March 1915 (aged 35); Prahran, Victoria

Playing career^{1}
Years	Club	Games (Goals)
1899	South Melbourne	1 (0)
- ^{1} Playing statistics correct to the end of 1899.

Arthur Ernest Nickless (18 March 1879 – 12 March 1915) was an Australian rules footballer who played for the South Melbourne Football Club in the Victorian Football League (VFL).

Originally from Victorian Football Association club Brunswick, Nickless was cleared to South Melbourne in 1899 where he played in only the first match of the season. He was a premiership half-back player for Leopold in the Metropolitan Junior Football Association in 1900.
