= Gerald Rush =

Australian rules footballer

Personal information
- Full name: Gerald Vincent Rush
- Born: 16 September 1895; Essendon, Victoria
- Died: 23 December 1988 (aged 93); Clovelly, New South Wales
- Original team: University
- Height: 180 cm (5 ft 11 in)
- Weight: 75 kg (165 lb)

Playing career^{1}
Years	Club	Games (Goals)
1920	Richmond	15 (16)
- ^{1} Playing statistics correct to the end of 1920.

Gerald Vincent Rush (16 September 1895 – 23 December 1988) was an Australian rules footballer who played with Richmond in the Victorian Football League (VFL).

== Family ==
The son of Roger Robert Rush (1856–1941), and Mary Rush (1856–1943), née Berry, Gerald Vincent Rush was born on 16 September 1895.

=== Siblings ===
Four of his seven brothers also played VFL football (They are the only set of five brothers to play in the VFL/AFL):

- Robert Thomas "Bob" Rush (1880–1975) (1890–1983), who played with Collingwood from 1899 to 1908.
- William Leopold "Leo" Rush (1890–1983), who played with Melbourne in 1911, and with Richmond in 1912.
- Bryan Joseph Rush (1893–1982), played with Collingwood in 1913 and 1914.
- Kevin Patrick Rush (1901–1984), played with Richmond in 1923 and 1924.

== Law ==
He graduated Bachelor of Arts (BA) in December 1920, and Master of Arts (MA) in April 1924. He was admitted to the Bar on 1 October 1925.

== See also ==
- List of Australian rules football families
