= Henry Garnet Forrest =

Australian Flying Corps captain (1895–1945)

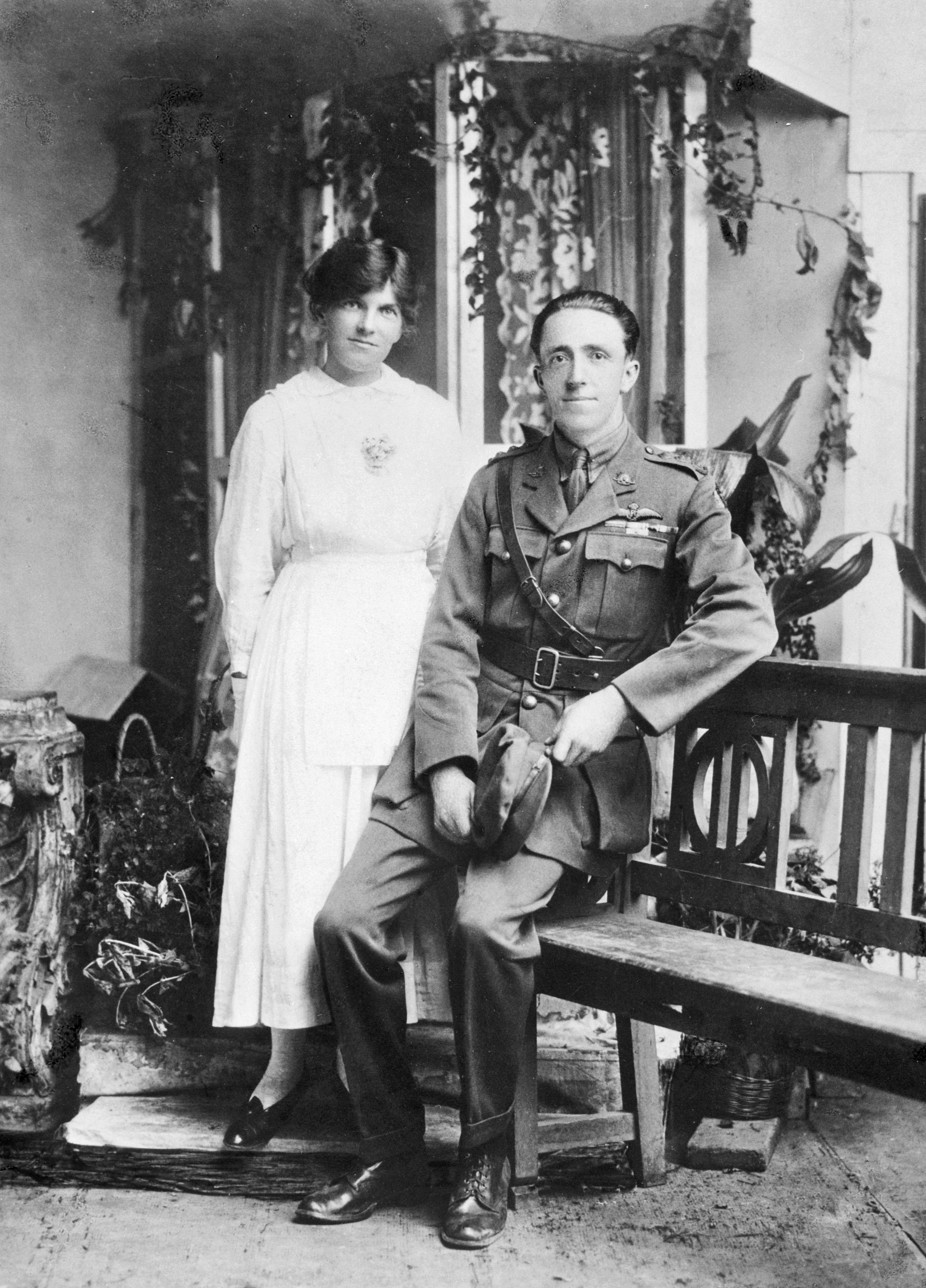
- Henry Forrest and his wife Cora on their wedding day, 1919
- Born: 5 December 1895; Brunswick, Victoria, Australia
- Died: 3 December 1945 (aged 49); Caulfield, Victoria, Australia
- Burial place: Springvale Botanical Cemetery, Springvale, Victoria
- Military career
- Allegiance: Australia
- Branch: Australian Imperial Force; Australian Flying Corps
- Service years: 1915–1919
- Rank: Captain
- Nickname: Rusty
- Units: 23rd Battalion; 46th Battalion; No. 2 Squadron AFC
- Conflicts: First World War; Gallipoli Campaign; Western Front
- Awards: Distinguished Flying Cross; Mentioned in Despatches; Silver Medal of Military Valor (Italy)

Henry Garnet Forrest, DFC (5 December 1895 – 3 December 1945) was an Australian First World War flying ace, credited with eleven aerial victories while serving in the Australian Flying Corps.

== Early life ==
Henry Garnet Forrest was born on 5 December 1895 in Brunswick, Melbourne, Australia. His father was Robert Forrest; he signed the enlistment papers granting permission for his son's enlistment. The younger Forrest was working as a cook when he enlisted on 19 February 1915, and swore he was a British subject.

== First World War ==
=== Infantry service ===
Forrest originally served as a Quartermaster Sergeant with the Australian Imperial Force's 23rd Infantry Battalion. He sailed from Australia on HMAT Euripides on 10 May 1915. After some time spent in Egypt, the 23rd Battalion shipped out to Gallipoli, whence it landed on the night of 4–5 September 1915.

After his return from Gallipoli to Egypt, Forrest was commissioned as a second lieutenant in the 46th Battalion on 12 March 1916. He shipped out for service on the Western Front on 2 June 1916. Forrest led a daring trench raid in the Hollandscheschuur salient in September 1916; this gained him a mention in despatches and the Italian Silver Medal of Military Valor.

=== Aerial service ===
During Bloody April 1917, Forrest transferred to the Australian Flying Corps. On 26 May he was given permission to wear his Italian Silver Medal of Military Valor. He served successively in No. 32 Squadron and No. 43 Squadron of the RFC until he was wounded in action on 6 August 1917 and removed from combat. In November 1917, he would return to combat as a Royal Aircraft Factory S.E.5a pilot in No. 2 Squadron AFC.

On 22 February 1918, Forrest was promoted to captain. Forrest began his string of aerial victories on 22 March 1918, when he drove down a German two-seater reconnaissance aircraft out of control, followed by the destruction of two Albatros D.V fighters over Bullecourt. The next day, he set a German reconnaissance aircraft afire northeast of Bapaume. A week later, he drove down another over Le Quesnel to become an ace.

On 2 April 1918, he and Roby Lewis Manuel destroyed a German reconnaissance aircraft southeast of Demuin. On the 12th, he destroyed one singlehanded over Vieille-Chapelle. On 9 May, he sent down a DFW reconnaissance aircraft out of control. On 1 June 1918, he destroyed a Fokker Triplane fighter over Chuignes. The following day, in two morning dogfights, he sent a Pfalz D.III out of control near Estrées, and another over Albert. His final tally amounted to six enemy aircraft destroyed, including the one shared with Manuel, and five more driven down out of control.

He was awarded the Distinguished Flying Cross (DFC) on 2 July 1918. He was also returned to Home Establishment in England during July. His DFC was gazetted on 3 August 1918. Its citation read:

Captain Henry Garnet Forrest (Australian Flying Corps) His leadership of patrols has been characterised by great dash and determination whether on high or low work. He has displayed skill in manoeuvring and boldness in attacking superior numbers.

He was admitted to Cobham Hall on 5 September 1918. He was sent home sick on HT Marathon, departing England on 6 November and arriving back in Melbourne on New Year's Day 1919.

== Post-war life ==
Forrest was discharged from the AFC on 23 February 1919. On 16 March 1920, he was one of the returned military veterans honoured by the Order of Druids at a banquet; he was granted a certificate in recognition of his service.

Forrest is noted in newspaper notes of social and sporting events in the Broken Hill area throughout the 1920s–40s; he served as secretary of the local tennis club, for instance. On 30 December 1947, he is noted as a pallbearer at a friend's funeral.

Henry Garnet Forrest died on 3 December 1945 at the Repatriation Hospital, Caulfield, aged 49. His funeral took place at the Springvale Crematorium two days later. On 31 May 1951, the death of his widow Cora was noted.
