= Tom Nolan (Australian rules footballer) =

Australian rules footballer (1876–1930)

Personal information
- Full name: Thomas Patrick Nolan
- Born: 11 December 1876; Wyndham Vale, Victoria
- Died: 27 May 1930 (aged 53); Richmond, Victoria

Playing career^{1}
Years	Club	Games (Goals)
1899	Fitzroy	2 (0)
- ^{1} Playing statistics correct to the end of 1899.

Thomas Patrick Nolan (11 December 1876 – 27 May 1930) was an Australian rules footballer who played with Fitzroy in the Victorian Football League (VFL).

Nolan joined Fitzroy for the 1899 VFL season and made his senior debut in Round 10, against Geelong. After one more match in the seniors, in Round 11, Nolan returned to the reserves and did not play another senior game.

Nolan become a lawyer and was also a state champion race walker. His brothers Bernie, Jerry and Herb also played football in the VFL.

Nolan died on 27 May 1930 of heart failure in Epworth Hospital in Richmond, Victoria. He left a widow.
