= Bryan Rush =

Australian rules footballer (1893–1982)

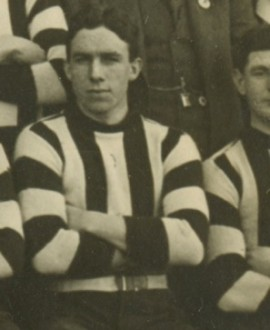
- Rush in 1913

Personal information
- Full name: Bryan Joseph Rush
- Born: 2 April 1893; Port Fairy, Victoria
- Died: 11 August 1982 (aged 89); Donvale, Victoria
- Original team: Beverley
- Height: 178 cm (5 ft 10 in)
- Weight: 75 kg (165 lb)

Playing career^{1}
Years	Club	Games (Goals)
1913–14	Collingwood	17 (17)
- ^{1} Playing statistics correct to the end of 1914.

Bryan Joseph Rush (2 April 1893 – 11 August 1982) was an Australian rules footballer who played with Collingwood in the Victorian Football League (VFL).

== Family ==
The son of Roger Robert Rush (1856–1941), and Mary Rush (1856–1943), née Berry, Bryan Joseph Rush was born at Port Fairy, Victoria on 2 April 1893.

=== Wife ===
He married Lorna McKay in 1927.

=== Siblings ===
Four of his seven brothers also played VFL football (They are the only set of five brothers to play in the VFL/AFL):

- Robert Thomas "Bob" Rush (1880–1975) (1890–1983), who played with Collingwood from 1899 to 1908.
- William Leopold "Leo" Rush (1890–1983), who played with Melbourne in 1911, and with Richmond in 1912.
- Gerald Vincent Rush (1895–1988), played with Richmond in 1920.
- Kevin Patrick Rush (1901–1984), played with Richmond in 1923 and 1924.

== Football ==
=== Collingwood (VFL) ===
Recruited from the Beverly Football Club in the Metropolitan Amateur Football Association (MAFA) in 1912.

=== New South Wales ===
In 1929 he was the honorary coach of the New South Wales side that came from behind to beat Tasmania by one point, at the Sydney Cricket ground on 22 June 1929.

== Military service ==
A Commonwealth public servant with the Treasury Department, he enlisted in the First AIF on 21 September 1914, and served overseas in the Australian Army Pay Corps.

In 1942, by this time a chartered accountant, he enlisted in the Second AIF, and served as the District Finance Officer at the Sydney Barracks, with the rank of Major.

== See also ==
- List of Australian rules football families
