= Norm Oliver (footballer, born 1885) =

Australian rules footballer, born 1885

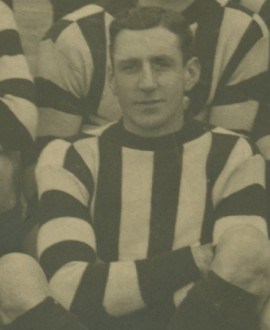
- Oliver in 1910

Personal information
- Full name: Norman Maxwell Oliver
- Born: 14 November 1885; Brunswick, Victoria
- Died: 20 February 1938 (aged 52); Swan Hill, Victoria
- Original team: Castlemaine
- Position: Wingman

Playing career^{1}
Years	Club	Games (Goals)
1909–1911	Collingwood	33 (2)
- ^{1} Playing statistics correct to the end of 1911.

Career highlights
- 1910 premiership player

Norman Maxwell Oliver (14 November 1885 – 20 February 1938) was an Australian rules footballer who played for Collingwood in the Victorian Football League (VFL).

== Family ==
The son of Charles Edward Oliver, and Jane Oliver, née Carson, Norman Maxwell Oliver was born in Brunswick, Victoria on 14 November 1885.

=== Siblings ===
His brothers Les and George also played VFL football, for Richmond and Melbourne respectively.

== Football ==
Oliver played in 33 games over three years with Collingwood in the VFL. He was a wingman for Collingwood in the 1910 VFL Grand Final win over Carlton.

== Death ==
At the time, a grazier in Swan Hill, while fighting a bushfire on the afternoon of Saturday, 19 February 1938, Oliver attempted to stop a bolting horse attached to a spring cart. In the process he was run over and injured. The bushfire caught up to him, his clothing caught fire, and he was extensively burned. He died later in hospital soon after he was admitted, on Sunday, 20 February 1938.

FIRE-FIGHTER KILLED
Former Athlete.
SWAN HILL, Sunday.— With the assistance of an employe, Mr. Norman Oliver was engaged tn extinguishing a grass fire on his property at Pental Island vesterday afternoon, when the wind changed suddenly and caused a chapter of accidents. The horse attached to the spring cart on which Oliver was standing became terrified, and dashed towards the fire. Oliver sprang to the ground and tried to head it off, but he missed his footing and the wheel of the cart passed over his left leg. Oliver was extensively burnt about the arms and legs, and was admitted to hospital in a critical condition.
Mr. Oliver died later from the injuries he suffered. He was 62 years of age, and was a member of a well-known Bendigo family. In his younger days he played with the Colllngwood football team, and was a successful athlete, having won the 1906 Shepparton Gift and other important events. He also played with the South Bendigo football club and Castlemaine, having been a post president of the former club.
Until about three years ago he was licensee of tho City Club Hotel, Bendigo, and subsequently was in partnership in tho management of the Royal Hotel, Swan Hill, which he left last year to take up grazing at Pental Island, in the Kerang district.
The Age, 21 February 1938.
