= George Moodie =

Australian rules footballer

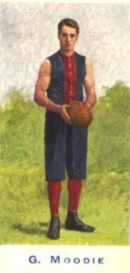

Personal information
- Full name: George Birrell Moodie
- Born: 22 October 1872; South Melbourne, Victoria
- Died: 4 June 1954 (aged 81); Northcote, Victoria
- Original team: Brighton
- Position: Ruck shepherd

Playing career^{1}
Years	Club	Games (Goals)
1894–1896	Melbourne (VFA)	50 (9)
1897–1905	Melbourne	134 (29)
Total		184 (38)
- ^{1} Playing statistics correct to the end of 1905.

Career highlights
- VFL premiership player: 1900

George Birrell Moodie (22 October 1872 – 4 June 1954) was an Australian rules footballer who played for the Melbourne Football Club in the early years of the Victorian Football League (VFL).

A strongly built yet durable ruck shepherd, Moodie played alongside champions Fred McGinis and Vic Cumberland. He started out at Melbourne in their Victorian Football Association days and then played in their first nine VFL seasons. Moodie was a three time Victorian interstate representative and a member of Melbourne's 1900 premiership team.

In early 1916, at the age of 43, he enlisted to serve in World War I but did not see active service.
