= Billy McGregor =

Australian rules footballer

Personal information
- Full name: William Francis McGregor
- Born: 20 November 1876; Williamstown, Victoria
- Died: 9 August 1919 (aged 42); Sunbury, Victoria
- Original team: Port Melbourne

Playing career^{1}
| Years | Club | Games (Goals) |
| 1899–1900 | St Kilda | 28 (2) |
- ^{1} Playing statistics correct to the end of 1900.

Billy McGregor (20 November 1876 – 9 August 1919) was an Australian rules footballer who played with St Kilda in the Victorian Football League (VFL).
