= Harry Parkin =

Australian rules footballer

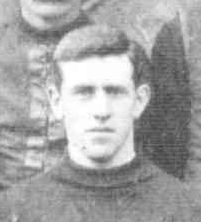

Personal information
- Full name: Christopher Henry Parkin
- Born: 21 June 1879; Kingston, Victoria
- Died: 6 July 1937 (aged 58); Melbourne, Victoria
- Original team: Ballarat
- Height: 179 cm (5 ft 10 in)
- Position: Defender

Playing career^{1}
Years	Club	Games (Goals)
1899	Geelong	2 (0)
1900–1906	Melbourne	85 (0)
Total		87 (0)
- ^{1} Playing statistics correct to the end of 1906.

Career highlights
- VFL premiership player: 1900

Christopher Henry Parkin (21 June 1879 – 6 July 1937) was an Australian rules footballer who played for the Geelong Football Club and Melbourne Football Club in the Victorian Football League (VFL). Parkin made his debut, playing for Geelong, against Melbourne in round 11 of the 1899 VFL season at Corio Oval. His brother Jack also played with Geelong in 1899. The next year he transferred to Melbourne and in his first season with the club became a premiership player, playing on a half-back flank in the 1900 VFL Grand Final. After his retirement from football he served as Melbourne's delegate to the VFL for over 10 years as well as being Treasurer of the VFL from 1932 until his death in 1937.
