= George Spilcker =

Australian rules footballer (1874–1918)

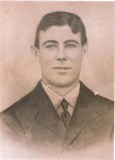

Personal information
- Full name: George Louis Spilcker
- Born: 12 June 1874; Port Melbourne, Victoria
- Died: 31 May 1916 (aged 41); Newport, Victoria
- Original team: Brighton

Playing career^{1}
Years	Club	Games (Goals)
1899–1901	St Kilda	22 (1)
- ^{1} Playing statistics correct to the end of 1901.

George Louis Spilcker (12 June 1874 – 31 May 1916) was an Australian rules footballer who played with St Kilda in the Victorian Football League (VFL).

== Career ==
Spilcker, originally from Brighton, first played for St Kilda in 1893, while they were in the Victorian Football Association (VFA). He spent some time in Western Australia before rejoining St Kilda in 1899. The club was now competing in the VFL and Spilcker, a wingman, was one of three St Kilda players to appear in all 17 league games in the 1899 season. One of those appearances was a 161-point loss to Geelong at Corio Oval, in which St Kilda kicked just one behind for the entire game, which remains a league record for the lowest ever score. Spilcker was regarded by The Argus as having been the "best man" for the losing team. He played just five further games for St Kilda, two in 1900 and three in 1901.

== Death ==
Spilcker was killed in an accident at the Newport Power House on 31 May 1916. A carpenter, he had been working on the roof when the glass broke and he fell 60 feet onto the concrete floor. He was 41 years old and had four children.
