= Kevin Rush =

Australian rules footballer, born 1901

Personal information
- Full name: Kevin Patrick Rush
- Born: 29 March 1901
- Died: 21 August 1984 (aged 83)
- Original team: Old Xavier

Playing career^{1}
Years	Club	Games (Goals)
1923–24	Richmond	7 (4)
- ^{1} Playing statistics correct to the end of 1924.

Kevin Patrick Rush (29 March 1901 – 21 August 1984) was a former Australian rules footballer who played with Richmond in the Victorian Football League (VFL).

== Family ==
The son of Roger Robert Rush (1856-1941), and Mary Rush (1856-1943), née Berry, Kevin Patrick Rush was born on 29 March 1901.

=== Wife ===
He married Elaine Howell on 12 May 1932.

=== Siblings ===
Four of his seven brothers also played VFL football (They are the only set of five brothers to play in the VFL/AFL):

- Robert Thomas "Bob" Rush (1880–1975) (1890–1983), who played with Collingwood from 1899 to 1908.
- William Leopold "Leo" Rush (1890–1983), who played with Melbourne in 1911, and with Richmond in 1912.
- Bryan Joseph Rush (1893–1982), played with Collingwood in 1913 and 1914.
- Gerald Vincent Rush (1895–1988), played with Richmond in 1920.

== Medicine ==
He graduated Bachelor of Medicine and Bachelor of Surgery (MBBS) in 1924, and Master of Surgery in December 1936, and was admitted to Fellowship of the Royal Australasian College of Surgeons in June 1947.

== See also ==
- List of Australian rules football families
