= John Barningham =

English theologian

John Barningham (died 1448) was an English theologian.

== Life ==
Barningham was educated at Oxford and Paris, in both of which places he is said to have taken his degree as master in theology. In later years he was appointed prior of Ipswich Whitefriars (the White Carmelites at Ipswich), where he died an old man on 22 January 1448. His older biographers praise his skill in disputation.

== Works ==
John Bale saw in one of the Cambridge libraries four great volumes of this author's works beautifully written; and John Pits adds that his writings had been collected by one of his friends at Oxford, who, after having them carefully copied out, had them conveyed to Cambridge for preservation. Barningham's writings consisted of 'Treatises on the Sentences,’ 'Sacræ Conciones,’ a treatise entitled 'De Enormitate Peccati,’ and similar theological commentaries.
