= Bill Wishart =

Australian rules footballer

Personal information
- Full name: William Robertson Wishart
- Born: 17 July 1882; St Kilda, Victoria
- Died: 28 May 1922 (aged 39); Royal Prince Alfred Hospital, Sydney

Playing career^{1}
Years	Club	Games (Goals)
1899	St Kilda	2 (1)
- ^{1} Playing statistics correct to the end of 1899.

William Robertson Wishart (17 July 1882 – 28 May 1922) was an Australian rules footballer who played with St Kilda in the Victorian Football League (VFL).
