= Thomas Carmody (American football) =

American football player and coach

Playing career
- 1887–1889: Fordham

Coaching career (HC unless noted)
- 1889: Fordham

Head coaching record
- Overall: 6–3–1

Thomas Carmody was an American college football player and coach. He was the head football coach at Fordham University for one season in 1889, compiling a record of 6–3–1.

== Head coaching record ==
Year	Team	Overall	Conference	Standing	Bowl/playoffs
Fordham (Independent) (1889)
1889	Fordham	6–3–1			
Fordham:		6–3–1			
Total:		6–3–1			
