= Tommy Ryan (Australian footballer) =

Australian rules footballer (1873–1948)

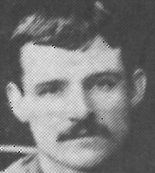

Personal information
- Full name: Thomas Herbert Arrowsmith
- Born: 12 August 1873; Sydney
- Died: 29 August 1948 (aged 75); Mont Park, Victoria
- Original team: Richmond City
- Position: Rover

Playing career^{1}
Years	Club	Games (Goals)
1893, 1895–1896	Richmond (VFA)	43 (14)
1896	Carlton (VFA)	1 (0)
1899–1902	Melbourne	55 (63)
1904	St Kilda	11 (8)
Total		110 (85)
- ^{1} Playing statistics correct to the end of 1904.

Career highlights
- VFL premiership player: 1900; Melbourne leading goalkicker: 1900

Thomas Herbert Arrowsmith (12 August 1873 – 29 August 1948), also known as Tommy Ryan, as was an Australian rules footballer who played for the Melbourne Football Club and St Kilda Football Club in the Victorian Football League (VFL).

== Family ==
The son of William Alexander Arrowsmith (1827–1911), and Henrietta Arrowsmith (1832–1920), née Hull, Thomas Herbert Arrowsmith was born in Sydney on 12 August 1873.

Both his parents were well-regarded, experienced actors; his mother had been known professionally in the 1850s and 1860s as "Henrietta Montrose", and his father, a Shakespearian actor, had been known professionally as "William Ryan".

He married twice: to Martha Elizabeth Hollman (1878–1936) in 1897 (they were divorced in 1905), and to Blanche Stella Dolphin (1884–1952), on 15 February 1913.

== Football ==
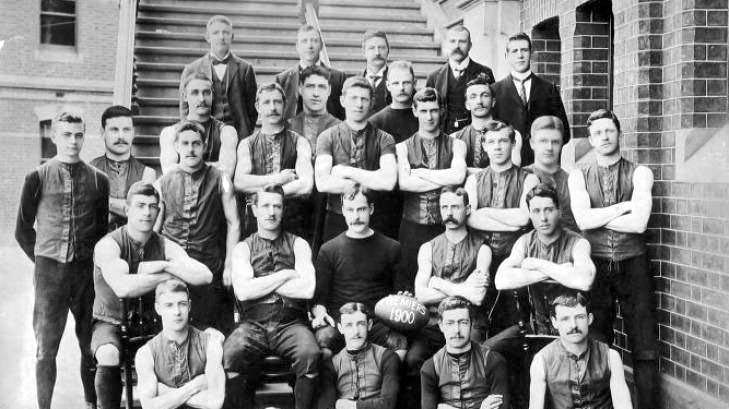
Melbourne Football team 1900. Tommy Ryan, extreme right, front row.

Ryan, a rover and forward, spent 1893, 1895 and 1896 playing in the Victorian Football Association (VFA) for both Carlton and Richmond.

=== Melbourne (VFL) ===
On 3 May 1899, he was cleared from Richmond to Melbourne.

On his VFL debut, Ryan kicked five goals as Melbourne defeated St Kilda by 93 points at the MCG on 13 May 1899.

He was the club's leading goal-kicker in their premiership year of 1900 with 24 goals, one of those in the 1900 VFL Grand Final which he played from a forward pocket.

=== VFL ===
He was part of the VFL team that played Interstate Football against South Australia, in Adelaide, on 26 June 1902.

=== St Kilda (VFL) ===
On 4 May 1904 he was cleared from Melbourne to St Kilda.

== Death ==
He died on 29 August 1948, at Mont Park, Victoria.
