= Herb Kennedy =

Australian rules footballer

Personal information
- Full name: Herbert Francis Kennedy
- Born: 21 February 1877; Fitzroy, Victoria
- Died: 23 March 1951 (aged 74); Prince of Wales Hospital, Randwick
- Original team: Windsor

Playing career^{1}
Years	Club	Games (Goals)
1899	St Kilda	1 (0)
- ^{1} Playing statistics correct to the end of 1899.

Herbert Francis Kennedy (21 February 1877 – 23 March 1951) was an Australian rules footballer who played with St Kilda in the Victorian Football League (VFL).
