= Leo Rush =

Australian rules footballer (1890–1983)

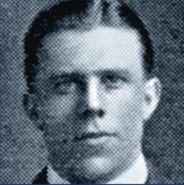

Personal information
- Full name: William Leopold Rush
- Born: 10 July 1890; Clifton Hill, Victoria
- Died: 5 August 1983 (aged 93)
- Original teams: Parade College, Beverley
- Height: 177 cm (5 ft 10 in)

Playing career^{1}
Years	Club	Games (Goals)
1911	Melbourne	6 (4)
1912	Richmond	2 (2)
Total		8 (6)
- ^{1} Playing statistics correct to the end of 1912.

William Leopold "Leo" Rush MBE (10 July 1890 – 5 August 1983) was an Australian rules footballer who played with Melbourne and Richmond in the Victorian Football League (VFL).

== Family ==
The son of Roger Robert Rush (1856–1941), and Mary Rush (1856–1943), née Berry, Robert Thomas Rush was born at Clifton Hill, Victoria on 10 July 1890.

=== Wife ===
He married Alice Irene Browne on 12 May 1927.

=== Siblings ===
Four of his seven brothers also played VFL football (They are the only set of five brothers to play in the VFL/AFL):

- Robert Thomas "Bob" Rush (1880–1975) (1890–1983), who played with Collingwood from 1899 to 1908.
- Bryan Joseph Rush (1893–1982), played with Collingwood in 1913 and 1914.
- Gerald Vincent Rush (1895–1988), played with Richmond in 1920.
- Kevin Patrick Rush (1901–1984), played with Richmond in 1923 and 1924.

== Education ==
He was awarded a Diploma in Commerce from Melbourne University in December 1927.

== MBE ==
He was appointed a Member of the Civil Division of the Most Excellent Order of the British Empire in the 1955 New Years Honours List.

== Death ==
He died at his residence on 5 August 1983.

== See also ==
- List of Australian rules football families
