= Jim Cullen (skier) =

Canadian para-alpine skier

Sport
- Country: Canada
- Sport: Para-alpine skiing
Medal record
Paralympic Games
Silver medal – second place	1980 Geilo	Slalom 1A

Jim Cullen is a Canadian para-alpine skier. He represented Canada at the 1980 Winter Paralympics in Geilo, Norway.

He competed in the Men's Giant Slalom 1A and Men's Slalom 1A events and he won the silver medal at the latter event.

== See also ==
- List of Paralympic medalists in alpine skiing
