= Pat Fitzgerald (footballer, born 1874) =

Australian rules footballer (1874–1903)

Personal information
- Full name: William Patrick Fitzgerald
- Born: 12 March 1874; Lucknow, Victoria
- Died: 25 March 1903 (aged 29); Tongio, Victoria
- Original team: South St Kilda
- Height: 171 cm (5 ft 7 in)
- Weight: 66 kg (146 lb)

Playing career^{1}
Years	Club	Games (Goals)
1899	Collingwood	1 (0)
- ^{1} Playing statistics correct to the end of 1899.

William Patrick Fitzgerald (12 March 1874 – 25 March 1903) was an Australian rules footballer who played with Collingwood in the Victorian Football League (VFL).

He died after falling from a horse in 1903.
