= Jack Mulcahy (footballer) =

Australian rules footballer (1876–1950)

Personal information
- Full name: John George Mulcahy
- Born: 12 August 1876; Clunes, Victoria
- Died: 12 August 1950 (aged 74); Glen Iris, Victoria
- Original team: Montague Juniors

Playing career^{1}
Years	Club	Games (Goals)
1899	Fitzroy	2 (0)
- ^{1} Playing statistics correct to the end of 1899.

John George Mulcahy (12 August 1876 – 12 August 1950) was an Australian rules footballer who played with Fitzroy in the Victorian Football League (VFL).

== Family ==
The son of John Stephen Mulcahy (1852-1932), and Margaret Jane Mulcahy (1856-1930), née Roberts, John George Mulcahy was born on 12 August 1876.

He married Edith Annie Merrifield (1877-1951) on 17 December 1902. They had two children: John Merrifield Mulcahy (1904-1987) and Charles Edgar Mulcahy (1906-1986).

He died on 12 August 1950.

== Football ==
Mulcahy was recruited from Metropolitan Junior Football Association (MJFA) club Montague. The MJFA, also known as the Victorian Junior Football Association, was the competition from which the teams that formed the VFL's Reserve Grade competition were drawn in 1919.
