= Arthur Sinclair (footballer) =

Australian rules footballer

Personal information
- Full name: Arthur Philip Sinclair
- Born: 23 March 1880; South Yarra, Victoria
- Died: 25 August 1948 (aged 68); Camperdown, New South Wales
- Original team: Melbourne Grammar

Playing career^{1}
| Years | Club | Games (Goals) |
| 1899 | Melbourne | 1 (0) |
- ^{1} Playing statistics correct to the end of 1899.

Arthur Philip Sinclair (23 March 1880 – 25 August 1948) was an Australian rules footballer who played for the Melbourne Football Club in the Victorian Football League (VFL).
