= Phil Busbridge =

Australian rules footballer

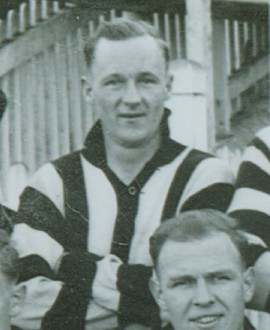
- Busbridge in 1942

Personal information
- Full name: Phillip Stephen Busbridge
- Born: 4 September 1920; Brunswick, Victoria
- Died: 11 December 1975 (aged 55); Pascoe Vale, Victoria
- Original team: Abbotsford
- Height: 177 cm (5 ft 10 in)
- Weight: 77.5 kg (171 lb)

Playing career^{1}
| Years | Club | Games (Goals) |
| 1941–43 | Collingwood | 14 (0) |
- ^{1} Playing statistics correct to the end of 1943.

Phillip Stephen Busbridge (4 September 1920 – 11 December 1975) was an Australian rules footballer who played with Collingwood in the Victorian Football League (VFL).

He also served in the Royal Australian Air Force during World War II.
