= Joe Lowrey =

Australian rules footballer

Personal information
- Full name: Joseph Alphonsus Lowrey
- Born: 3 August 1879; Wangaratta, Victoria
- Died: 8 August 1948 (aged 69); Heidelberg, Victoria
- Original team: South St Kilda

Playing career^{1}
Years	Club	Games (Goals)
1899	South Melbourne	1 (0)
- ^{1} Playing statistics correct to the end of 1899.

Joseph Alphonsus Lowrey (3 August 1879 – 8 August 1948) was an Australian rules footballer who played with South Melbourne in the Victorian Football League (VFL).
