= Jim Cullen =

Australian rules footballer

Personal information
- Full name: Jim Cullen
- Born: 9 June 1878
- Died: 9 May 1954 (aged 75)
- Original team: Port Melbourne

Playing career^{1}
Years	Club	Games (Goals)
1899	Essendon	1 (0)
1899	South Melbourne	1 (0)
1902–1903	Melbourne	0 (0)
1904	Carlton	1 (0)
Total		3 (0)
- ^{1} Playing statistics correct to the end of 1904.

Jim Cullen (9 June 1878 – 9 May 1954) was an Australian rules footballer who played with the Essendon Football Club, South Melbourne Football Club and Carlton Football Club in the Victorian Football League (VFL). He was also listed with the Melbourne Football Club, but never played a game.
