= Alan Sinclair (footballer) =

Australian rules footballer

Personal information
- Full name: Alan Hector Sinclair
- Born: 17 April 1900; Brunswick, Victoria
- Died: 1 September 1972 (aged 72); Mount Eliza, Victoria

Playing career^{1}
Years	Club	Games (Goals)
1918–1920	St Kilda	19 (1)
- ^{1} Playing statistics correct to the end of 1920.

Alan Hector Sinclair (17 April 1900 – 1 September 1972) was an Australian rules footballer who played with the St Kilda Football Club in the Victorian Football League (VFL).
