= Démuin =

- Commune
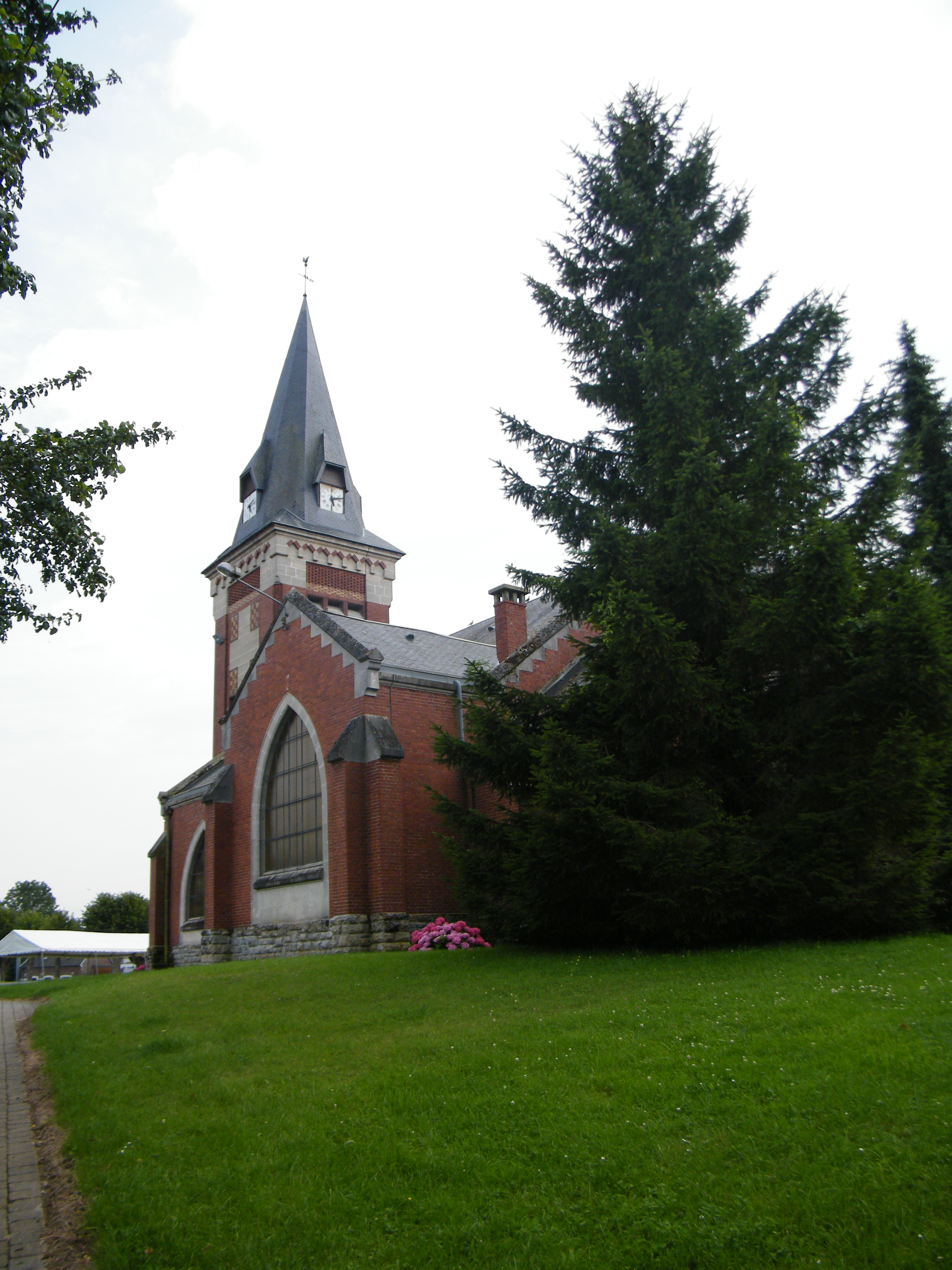
- The church in Démuin

- Coat of arms
- Location of Démuin
- Location within France Location within Hauts-de-France
- Coordinates: 49°49′15″N 2°32′15″E
- Country: France
- Region: Hauts-de-France
- Department: Somme
- Arrondissement: Montdidier
- Canton: Moreuil
- Intercommunality: CC Avre Luce Noye

Government
  - Mayor (2020–2026): Alain Dovergne
- Area^{1}: 11.23 km^{2} (4.34 sq mi)
- Elevation: 60 m (200 ft)
- Highest elevation: 104 m (341 ft)
- Lowest elevation: 40 m (130 ft)
- Population (2023): 524
  - Density: 46.7/km^{2} (121/sq mi)
- Time zone: UTC+01:00 (CET)
  - Summer (DST): UTC+02:00 (CEST)
- INSEE/Postal code: 80237 /80110
- ^{1} French Land Register data, which excludes lakes, ponds, glaciers > 1 km^{2} (0.386 sq mi or 247 acres) and river estuaries.

Démuin (French pronunciation: [demɥɛ̃]) is a commune in the Somme department in Hauts-de-France in northern France.

== Geography ==
The commune is situated on the D23 road, some 14 miles (23 km) southeast of Amiens.

== Population ==
Historical population
Year	Pop.	±% p.a.
1968	360	—
1975	325	−1.45%
1982	385	+2.45%
1990	419	+1.06%
1999	431	+0.31%
2007	459	+0.79%
2012	480	+0.90%
2017	493	+0.54%
2023	524	+1.02%
Source: INSEE

== See also ==
- Communes of the Somme department
