= Alex Barningham =

Australian rules footballer

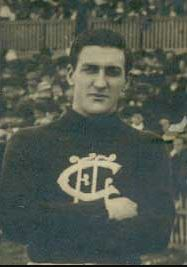
- Barningham during his Carlton career

Personal information
- Full name: Alick Strawson Barningham
- Born: 22 February 1889; Brunswick, Victoria
- Died: 4 January 1956 (aged 66); Golden Square, Victoria
- Original team: Carlton Districts
- Height: 180 cm (5 ft 11 in)
- Weight: 75 kg (165 lb)

Playing career^{1}
Years	Club	Games (Goals)
1909–1913, 1915	Carlton	56 (24)
- ^{1} Playing statistics correct to the end of 1915.

Alick Strawson Barningham (22 February 1889 – 4 January 1956) was an Australian rules footballer who played for the Carlton Football Club in the Victorian Football League (VFL).

== Death ==
He died at his residence in Golden Square, Victoria on 4 January 1956.
