= Mick O'Loughlin (Australian footballer) =

Australian rules footballer

Personal information
- Full name: Michael O'Loughlin
- Born: 12 February 1876; Brunswick, Victoria
- Died: 6 May 1905 (aged 29); Brunswick, Victoria

Playing career^{1}
Years	Club	Games (Goals)
1899	Essendon	5 (0)
1901	St Kilda	9 (0)
Total		14 (0)
- ^{1} Playing statistics correct to the end of 1901.

Michael O'Loughlin (12 February 1876 – 6 May 1905) was an Australian rules footballer who played with Essendon and St Kilda in the Victorian Football League (VFL). He died at the age of 29 from acute pneumonia and bronchitis.
