= Joe Finlay =

Australian rules footballer

Personal information
- Full name: Joseph James Finlay
- Born: 13 April 1879; Towaninny, Victoria
- Died: 15 September 1961 (aged 82); Hartwell, Victoria
- Original team: Collegians
- Height: 177 cm (5 ft 10 in)
- Weight: 72.5 kg (160 lb)

Playing career^{1}
Years	Club	Games (Goals)
1899	Melbourne	1 (0)
- ^{1} Playing statistics correct to the end of 1899.

Joseph James Finlay (13 April 1879 – 15 September 1961) was an Australian rules footballer who played with Melbourne in the Victorian Football League (VFL).
