= Tom Carmody =

Australian rules footballer

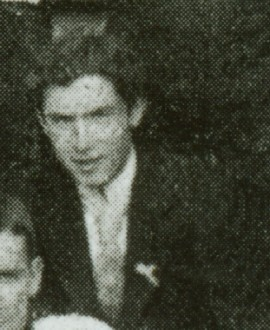
- Carmody during his Collingwood career

Personal information
- Full name: Thomas Joseph Carmody
- Born: 10 February 1880; North Melbourne, Victoria
- Died: 23 May 1932 (aged 52); East Melbourne, Victoria
- Original team: Celtic
- Height: 173 cm (5 ft 8 in)
- Weight: 69 kg (152 lb)

Playing career^{1}
Years	Club	Games (Goals)
1899–1900, 1903	Collingwood	8 (3)
- ^{1} Playing statistics correct to the end of 1903.

Thomas Joseph Carmody (10 February 1880 – 23 May 1932) was an Australian rules footballer who played with Collingwood in the Victorian Football League (VFL).
