= Dick Gorsuch =

Australian rules footballer

Personal information
- Full name: Edward William Gorsuch
- Born: 26 November 1878; Carlton, Victoria
- Died: 7 August 1934 (aged 55); Fitzroy, Victoria
- Original team: Princes Hill

Playing career^{1}
Years	Club	Games (Goals)
1899	Carlton	1 (0)
- ^{1} Playing statistics correct to the end of 1899.

Edward William "Dick" Gorsuch (26 November 1878 – 7 August 1934) was an Australian rules footballer who played with Carlton in the Victorian Football League (VFL).

== Family ==
The son of Edward William Gorsuch (-1928), and Louisa Gorsuch (1857-1910), née Holland, Edward William Gorsuch was born in Carlton, Victoria on 26 November 1878.

He married Edith Maud Walton (1878-1962) in 1902. They had two children: Edward William Augustus Roy Gorsuch (1903-1972), Hazel Maud Griffiths, née Gorsuch (1906-1946).

== Football ==
Injured in the pre-season, He only played one game for the Carlton First XVIII: at full-forward, against Melbourne, at the MCG, on 15 July 1899.

In 1901 he was cleared from Carlton to Carlton Juniors.

== Death ==
He died at St Vincent's Hospital, Melbourne on 7 August 1934.
