= Joe Strong (footballer) =

Australian rules footballer

Personal information
- Full name: Joseph Arthur Strong
- Born: 10 June 1876; Brunswick, Victoria
- Died: 9 September 1927 (aged 51); East Melbourne, Victoria

Playing career^{1}
Years	Club	Games (Goals)
1898	South Melbourne	2 (0)
- ^{1} Playing statistics correct to the end of 1898.

Joseph Arthur Strong (10 June 1876 – 9 September 1927) was an Australian rules footballer who played with South Melbourne in the Victorian Football League (VFL).
