= Bob Rush (Australian footballer) =

Australian rules footballer (1880–1975)

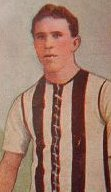
- Rush in 1910

Personal information
- Full name: Robert Thomas Rush
- Born: 9 October 1880; Richmond, Victoria
- Died: 13 March 1975 (aged 94); Northcote, Victoria
- Original team: CBC Parade

Playing career^{1}
Years	Club	Games (Goals)
1899–1908	Collingwood	143 (1)
- ^{1} Playing statistics correct to the end of 1908.

Career highlights
- 2× VFL premiership player: 1902, 1903; VFL premiership coach: 1930 (caretaker)

Robert Thomas Rush OBE (9 October 1880 – 13 March 1975) was an Australian rules footballer who played for the Collingwood Football Club in the Victorian Football League (VFL).

== Family ==
The son of Roger Robert Rush (1856–1941), and Mary Rush (1856–1943), née Berry, Robert Thomas Rush was born at Richmond, Victoria, on 9 October 1880.

=== Wife ===
He married Eileen Mary Maguire on 28 November 1911.

=== Siblings ===
Four of his seven brothers also played VFL football (they are the only set of five brothers to play in the VFL/AFL):

- William Leopold "Leo" Rush (1890–1983), who played with Melbourne in 1911, and with Richmond in 1912.
- Bryan Joseph Rush (1893–1982), played with Collingwood in 1913 and 1914.
- Gerald Vincent Rush (1895–1988), played with Richmond in 1920.
- Kevin Patrick Rush (1901–1984), played with Richmond in 1923 and 1924.

== Football ==
Rush was a pacy defender and played mainly on a half-back flank, although he was also used in the back pockets. He was a member of Collingwood's 1902 and 1903 premierships.

== Administrator ==
After retiring as a player, Rush continued to serve Collingwood in a variety of roles over the years, including committeeman, assistant secretary and treasurer. He eventually resigned from his last official position, that of committeeman, in mid-1950 as a consequence of the controversy that ensued over the appointment of Bervin Woods as coach of the First XVIII.

In 1930, Rush performed match-day coaching duties to lead the club to its fourth consecutive premiership, filling in for Jock McHale who was ill; however, following a decision by AFL historians in 2014, McHale is now credited as Collingwood's sole coach in the game for the purposes of coaching statistics.

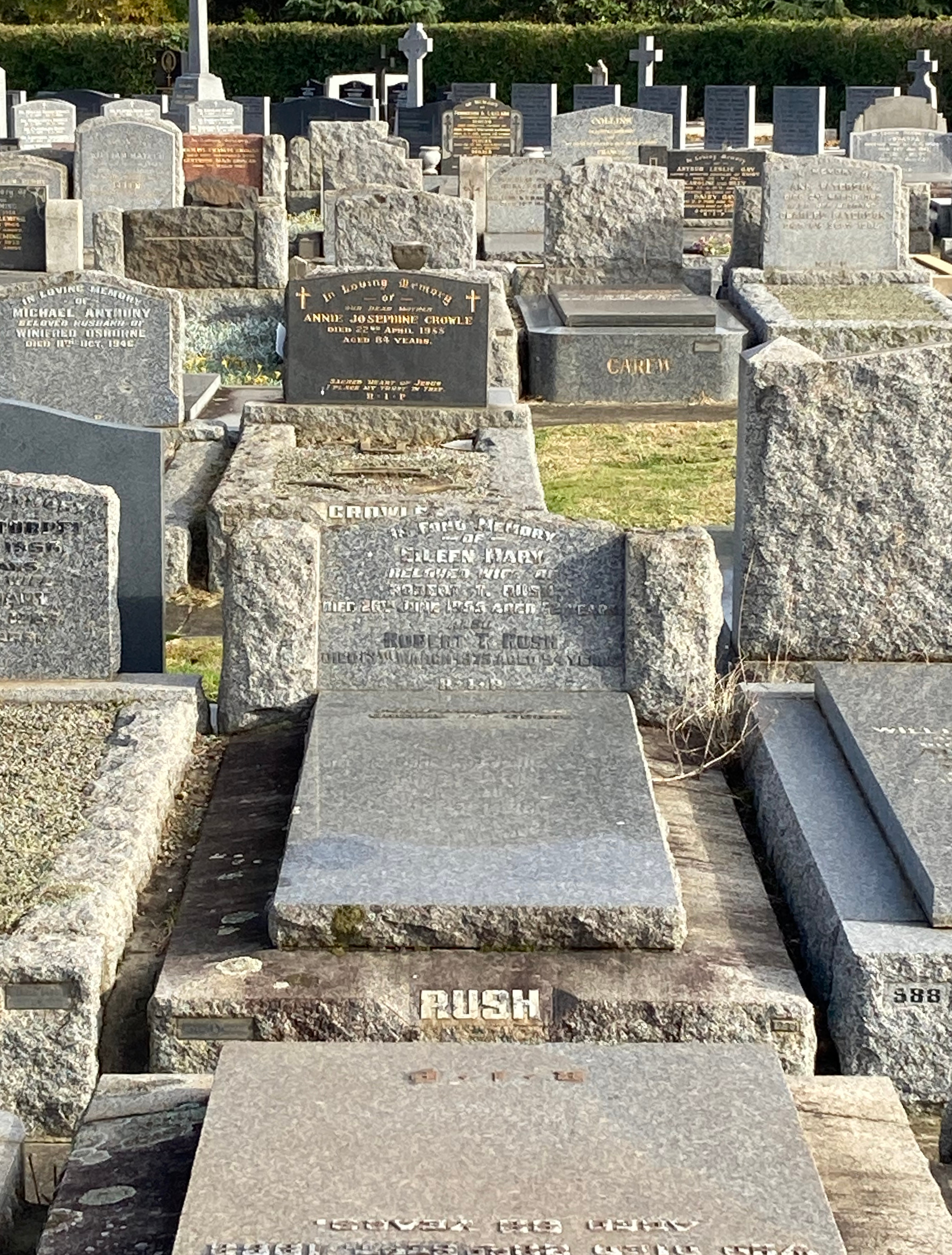
Rush's grave at Melbourne General Cemetery

He is credited with having coined the Collingwood club motto of Floreat Pica ("May the Magpies Prosper").

== Australian National Football Council ==
Rush was president of the Australian National Football Council from 1935 to 1946, heading the body that was in charge of the laws of Australian football.

== Death ==
He died on 13 March 1975, aged 94, and was buried at Melbourne General Cemetery.

== See also ==
- List of Australian rules football families
