= Caulfield Grammarians =

Caulfield Grammarians can refer to:

== People ==
- Individuals who are attending, or have attended Caulfield Grammar School (see List of Caulfield Grammar School people).

== Sporting ==
- The Caulfield Grammarians Football Club as an entity, or to its players collectively.
