= Andrew Kellaway =

Andrew Kellaway may refer to:

- Andrew Kellaway (Australian rules footballer)
- Andrew Kellaway (rugby union)
