= George Cassidy (Australian footballer) =

Australian rules footballer (1905–1985)

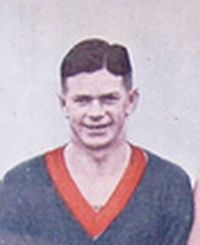

Personal information
- Full name: George Boucher Cassidy
- Born: 19 August 1905
- Died: 12 January 1985 (aged 79)
- Original team: Caulfield Grammarians Football Club

Playing career^{1}
Years	Club	Games (Goals)
1929–31	Melbourne	13 (5)
- ^{1} Playing statistics correct to the end of 1931.

George Boucher Cassidy (19 August 1905 – 12 January 1985) was an Australian rules footballer who played with Melbourne in the Victorian Football League (VFL).

He attended Caulfield Grammar School, and was recruited by Melbourne from the Caulfield Grammarians Football Club. In 1928, playing for Caulfield Grammarians, he was declared to be the best and fairest player in the Victorian Amateur Football Association's A Grade competition: "as a ruck and half-forward … G. Cassidy, of Old Caulfield Grammarians … has been a mainstay of that team all the season through".

Towards the end of the 1928 season he played two games for the Brighton First XVIII in the Victorian Football Association: the first against Port Melbourne in the final home-and-away game for the season on Saturday, 18 August 1928, and the second in the season's second semi-final (Brighton lost to Coburg by three points). In 1929 he was, again, playing for Caulfield Grammarians (who had been relegated to B Grade), and was selected to play for the Victorian Amateur Football Association team against the South Australian Amateur Football Association.

He played his first match for the Melbourne First XVIII against Essendon in round 9 (Saturday, 29 June 1929) of the 1929 season: he kicked two goals.

He was a member of the Melbourne Second XVIII—playing at centre half-forward he kicked the first goal of the match—that won the 1931 premiership, beating Geelong Seconds by 8 points.

== See also ==
- List of Caulfield Grammar School people
