= Shallcross =

Shallcross may refer to:

- Shallcross, Durban, a suburb of Durban, South Africa
- Shallcross, Derbyshire, UK
- Shallcross (Anchorage, Kentucky), listed on the U.S. National Register of Historic Places
- Shallcross (surname)
