= Robert Fowler (surgeon, soldier) =

Australian surgeon and soldier (1888–1965)

- Born: 5 March 1888; East Smithfield, London
- Died: 8 May 1965 (aged 77); Toorak, Victoria
- Education: Caulfield Grammar School; University of Melbourne
- Occupations: surgeon and gynaecologist
- Years active: 1911–1955
- Known for: pioneer of (Australian) medical statistics, especially known for establishing the association between tobacco smoking and lung cancer

Robert Fowler (5 March 1888 – 8 May 1965) was an Australian surgeon and soldier.

== Family ==
The son, and eldest of the four children of the surgeon Walter Fowler (1857-1917), and Alice Maud Fowler (1862-1946), née Wacher, Robert Fowler was born at East Smithfield, London, England on 5 March 1888.

He married Elsie Walsh (1891-1975), in Egypt, on 12 January 1915.

== Education ==
Having won a scholarship to do so, he attended Caulfield Grammar School for three years: 1900–1902.

== Military service ==
He served in World War I with the Australian Mounted Division, obtaining the rank of Colonel.

== Medical practitioner ==
In civilian life he practiced at The Alfred Hospital, Melbourne; represented the Victoria Branch of the British Medical Association; was an advocate of the 'Airway Ambulance' (forerunner to the Royal Flying Doctor Service of Australia); served on the staff of the Governor-General Sir Isaac Isaacs; researched the use of the Radium Ray for cancer treatment; and pioneered the work of establishing the linkage between smoking and lung cancer.

== Death ==
He died, in Toorak, Melbourne, on 8 May 1965.

== See also ==
- List of Caulfield Grammar School people
