= Charles Abbott (footballer) =

Australian rules footballer and polo player (1939-2025)

Personal information
- Full name: Charles Percy Abbott
- Born: 10 June 1939; Finley, New South Wales
- Died: 5 January 2025 (aged 85)
- Original team: University Blues
- Height: 180 cm (5 ft 11 in)
- Weight: 76 kg (168 lb)

Playing career^{1}
Years	Club	Games (Goals)
1961–1963	Hawthorn	17 (4)
- ^{1} Playing statistics correct to the end of 1963.

Career highlights
- Australian Sports Medal: 2000

Charles Percy Abbott (10 June 1939 – 5 January 2025) was an Australian rules footballer who played with Hawthorn in the Victorian Football League (VFL). He was also a polo player was a recipient of the Australian Sports Medal award.

== Education ==
Abbott was educated at Caulfield Grammar School (dux of school, 1956). He was a member of the school's athletic team, First IV (tennis), First XI (cricket) and First XVIII (football). He then studied at the University of Melbourne where he gained a Bachelor of Laws degree in 1962.

== Football ==
In 1958, he played for Caulfield Grammarians Football Club in C-Section of the Victorian Amateur Football Association (VAFA). In 1959, he played for Trinity College in the University of Melbourne's Inter-College Championship and was selected as the best and fairest player for that year's competition.

Playing at centre, he was best on the ground in the University Blues' 1960 upset VAFA A-Section Grand Final win over Old Melburnians Football Club, 9.10 (64) to 6.6 (42).

Recruited from University Blues, and granted a permit in March 1961, he played just 17 games in three years at Hawthorn. He played his last match, at centre, for Hawthorn in its 1963 semi-final loss to Geelong. He was replaced by Ron Nalder in both the Preliminary Final against Melbourne, and the Grand Final against Geelong. He retired from football just before the 1964 season in order to concentrate on his legal studies.

== Polo ==
A talented polo player with the Hexham Polo Club (as was Carlton's John Goold), Abbott was awarded the Australian Sports Medal on 24 October 2000 for services to polo as both a player and an administrator. He was president of the Victorian Polo Association from 1983 to 1992; was and in 1992 made a life member.

== Law ==
Holding a Legal Practising Certificate, he was a member of the Law Institute of Victoria and a fellow of the Australian Institute of Company Directors.

Abbot also held chairmanships and directorships of publicly listed property companies and trusts, private equity and corporate services companies and publicly listed international insurance companies, including Norwich Union Group for 21 years (deputy chairman), Norwich Winterthur Insurance Limited and Norwich Union Life Assurance Limited; and he has also carried out pro bono work involving fund raising and management, serving variously as chairman of the Trinity College Foundation, as a member of the finance committee of the Murdoch Institute and a director of the Hawthorn Football Club Foundation.

== See also ==
- List of Caulfield Grammar School people
