= List of Caulfield Grammar School people =

Caulfield Grammar School and Malvern Memorial Grammar School (amalgamated with Caulfield in 1961), has had many notable students and staff. Alumni of the school are known as "Caulfield Grammarians" and are supported by the Caulfield Grammarians' Association.

Years of attendance are shown in brackets; MMGS denotes Malvern Memorial Grammar School. All persons listed were students, unless otherwise indicated.

== A ==
- Charles Abbott (1951–56) – VFL footballer; polo player; Dux of School (1956)
- Dean Anderson (1980–85) – Australian Football League (AFL) footballer
- Allan Ashbolt (1935–37) – actor, theatre critic, ABC broadcaster, foreign correspondent and journalist
- David Astbury (2007–08) – AFL footballer

== B ==
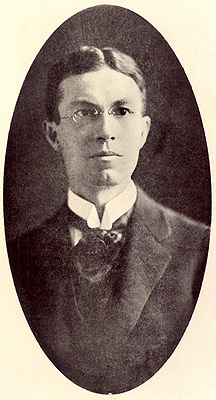
Sir John Clifford Valentine Behan

- William Macmahon Ball AC (1916–17) – psychologist; diplomat; broadcaster
- Ernest Judd Barnett (Staff 1888–1896) – second owner and principal of Caulfield Grammar School
- Jimmy Bartel (staff)- AFL Hall of Famer
- Russell Basser (1972–77) – medical researcher; water polo player at the 1984 Summer Olympics
- Sir John Clifford Valentine Behan (1894–95) – first Victorian Rhodes Scholar; warden, Trinity College of the University of Melbourne
- Hamish Blake (1994–96) – member of comedic duo Hamish & Andy
- Hugh Boyd DSO (1900–?) – VFL footballer with University
- Jordan Brown (2009–2014) – Melbourne Victory soccer player
- Tomas Bugg (2009–2011) – AFL footballer GWS and Melbourne
- Martyn Arnold Buntine (1904–?) – Australian rules footballer who played for the St Kilda Football Club, educationalist
- Walter Murray Buntine (Staff 1896–1931) – third owner and principal of Caulfield Grammar School

== C ==
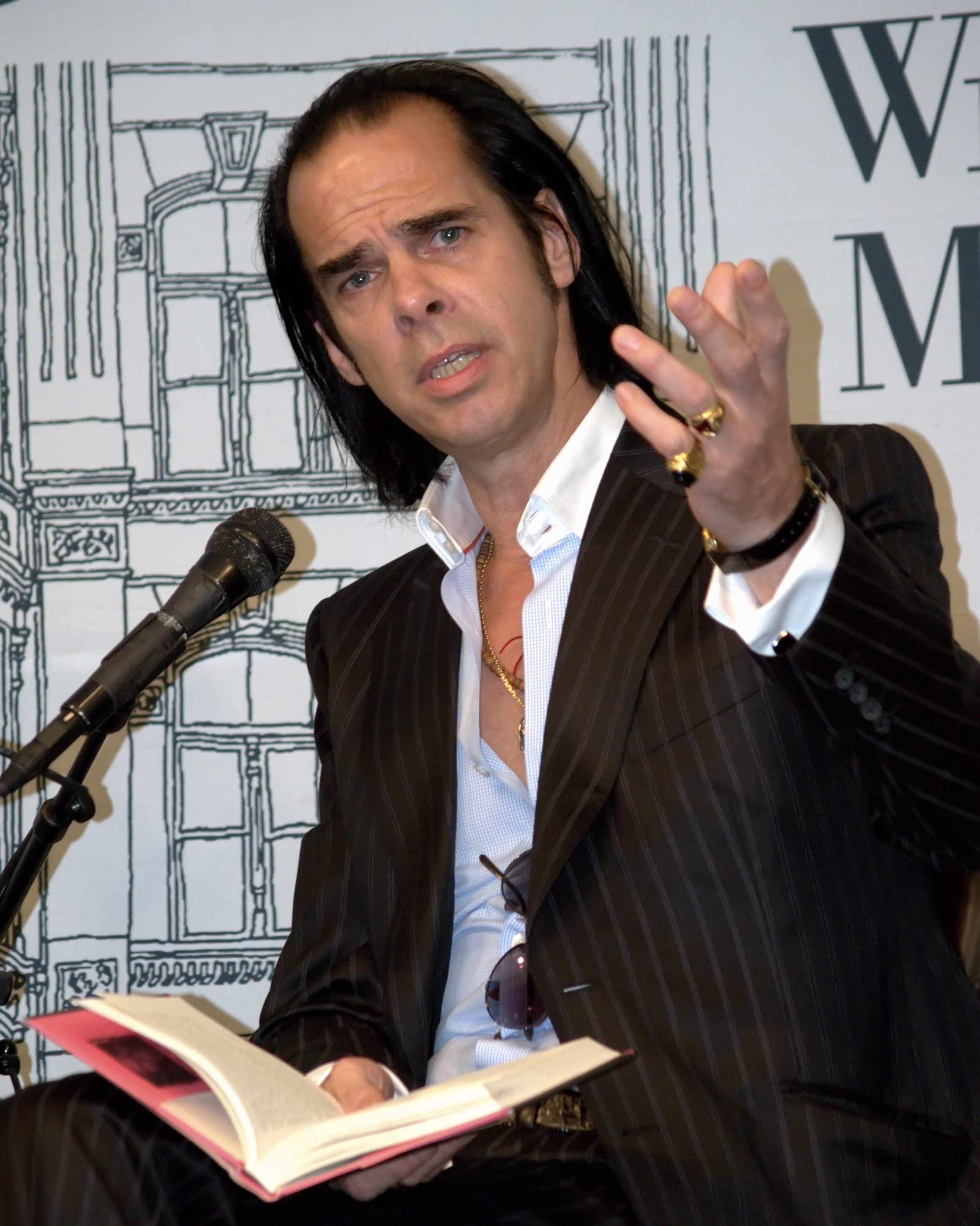
Nick Cave

- Phill Calvert (1969–75) – musician
- George Cassidy (1917–1921) – VFL footballer (Melbourne)
- Nick Cave (1971–75) – musician; author
- Mark Chaffey (1990–95) – AFL footballer
- Chris Christiansen (1921–22) – physicist; engineer
- Michael Clyne (1950–56) – linguist
- Ken Coghill (1959–62) – former Speaker of the Victorian Legislative Assembly
- James Connor (2008–10) – diver
- Noel Counihan (1928) – social realist painter
- Finlay Crisp (1929) – academic
- Claude Terrell Crowl (1903–1905) – VFL footballer, died during landing at Anzac Cove on 25 April 1915
- Penny Cula-Reid (2000–05) – AFL Women's footballer
- Alexander Charles Cumming (1895–97) – analytical, physical, and industrial chemist; academic; Doctor of Science (1906), industrial chemist

== D ==
- Irving Davidson (1943–?) – VFL footballer with St Kilda, and VFA footballer with Brighton
- Brett Deledio (2005) – AFL footballer

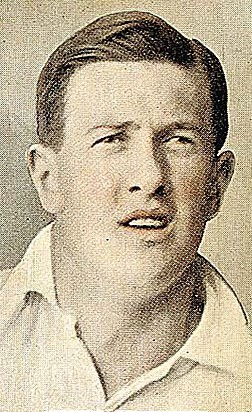
Hans Ebeling

- Alex Denney (1939–1942) – VFL footballer with Collingwood
- Peter McCallum Dowding (1948–56) – former Premier of Western Australia
- Peter Hogarth Doyle AO OBE (Mil.) (1925–2007) – Rear-Admiral, Royal Australian Navy

== E ==
- Hans Ebeling MBE (1919–22) – Australian Test Cricketer
- Robert Eddy (2004–05) – AFL footballer
- Austin Burton Edwards (1916–27) – geologist; academic; Dux of school 1926
- Ron Evans AM (1951–56) – Victorian Football League (VFL) footballer; AFL Chairman; businessman

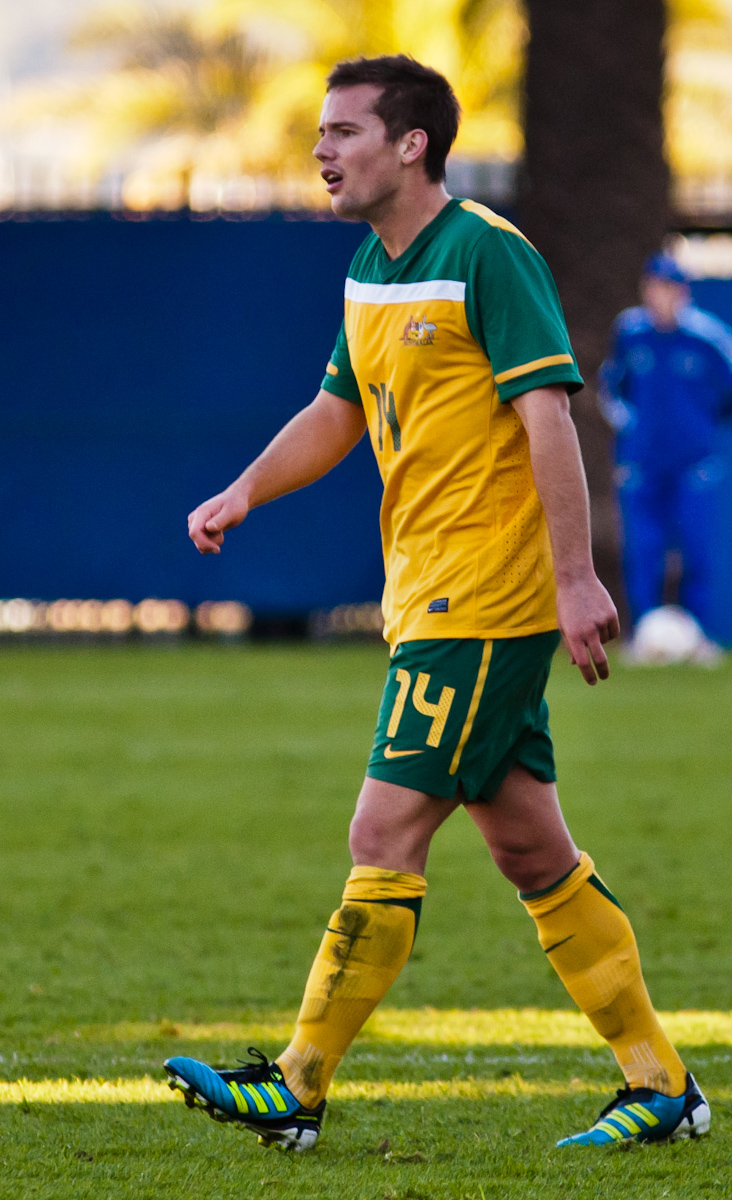
M. Foschini

== F ==
- Sir James Alexander Forrest (1920–22) – lawyer; businessman
- Matthew Foschini (2003–08) – football player
- Robert Fowler OBE (Mil.) (1900–02) – obstetrician; gynaecologist; surgeon; soldier

== G ==
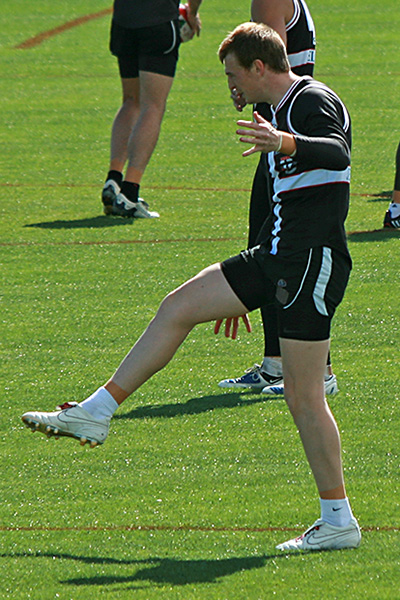
B. Goddard

- Richard Horace Maconchie "Dick" Gibbs MC (1908–1911) – VFL footballer, medical student, soldier, died in action in World War I
- Herbert Marcus Glasscock (1916–1918) – VFL footballer
- Brendon Goddard (2001–03) – AFL footballer
- Robert Cuthbert Grieve VC (1899–1957) – World War I veteran; Victoria Cross recipient
- Philip Lewis Griffiths KC (1894–?) – jurist
- Geoff Grover (1949–1960) – Australian rules footballer with St Kilda and Port Melbourne (VFA State Representative, ANFC Carnival 1966)

== H ==
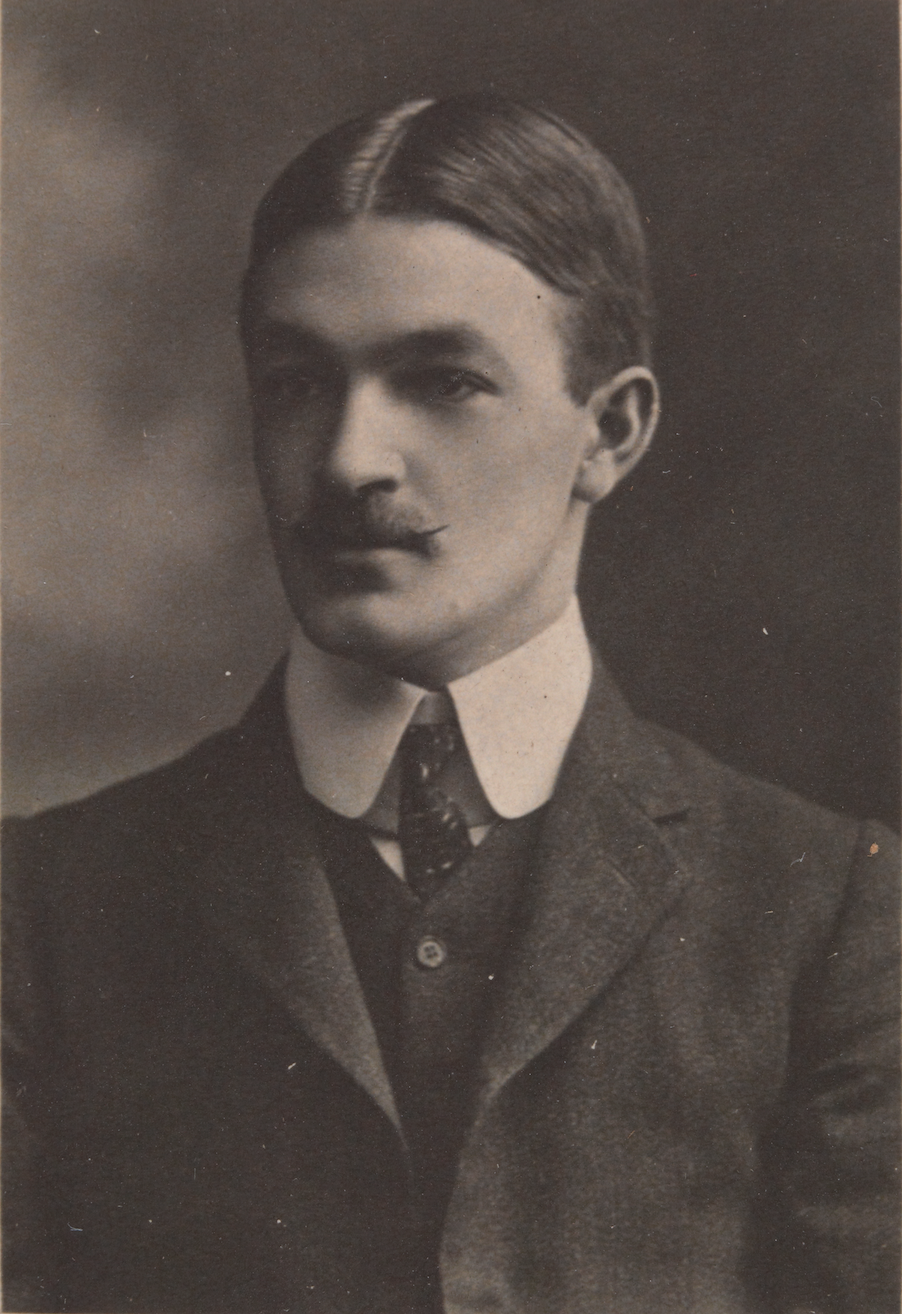
E.G. Honey

- Mick Harvey (1969–75) – musician, Nick Cave & The Bad Seeds
- Edward George Honey (1895–?) – journalist; suggested the idea of a moment of silence to remember the World War I Armistice Treaty
- Mack Horton (2000–14) – swimmer and 2016 Summer Olympics gold medalist
- John Martin Hull (staff) – theologian; editor of British Journal of Religious Education
- Herbert Humphreys Hunter (1896–99) – VFL footballer, dentist, killed in action at Gallipoli Cove on 8 May 1915

== J ==
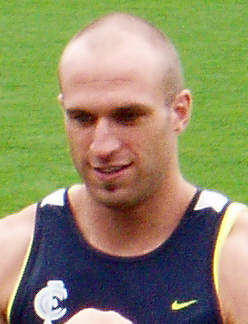
Chris Judd

- Paul Jennings AM (1956–60) – author
- Nick Jewell (1988–95) – Victorian cricketer; AFL footballer
- Murray Johnstone (1931–1942) – VFL footballer (St Kilda)
- Chris Judd (1996–2001) – AFL footballer; Brownlow Medallist (2004, 2010)

== K ==
- Peter Karmel AC CBE (1929–39) – economist; academic
- Norman Kaye (Staff 1958–1977) – actor; musician
- Andrew Kellaway (1988–93) – AFL footballer
- Charles Kellaway MC (1900–?) – scientist
- Duncan Kellaway (1985–90) – AFL footballer
- Steve Kons (1977–82) – Tasmanian politician; former Deputy Premier of Tasmania
- Alice Kunek – professional basketball player

== L ==
- Hugh Gemmell Lamb-Smith (Staff; 1913–1951) – Australian educator who, as a member of the Second Field Ambulance, landed at Anzac Cove on 25 April 1915
- John Landy AC CVO MBE (MMGS 1935–44) – Olympic athlete; former Governor of Victoria
- Frank Langley (1896–?) – VFL footballer with Melbourne, VFL state representative 1903, 1904
- Henry Thomas Langley (1892–95) – Church of England clergyman, army chaplain, Dean of Melbourne (1942)
- Jason Lea (1952–58) – Managing Director, Darrell Lea Chocolates; Chairman, Family Business Association
- Thomas Leather (1926–26) — VFL footballer with North Melbourne, and a Victoria Sheffield Shield cricketer who played in four "unofficial" Tests against India in the Australian "First Class" team that toured Ceylon and India in 1935–36
- Dylan Lewis (1985–90) – television personality

== M ==
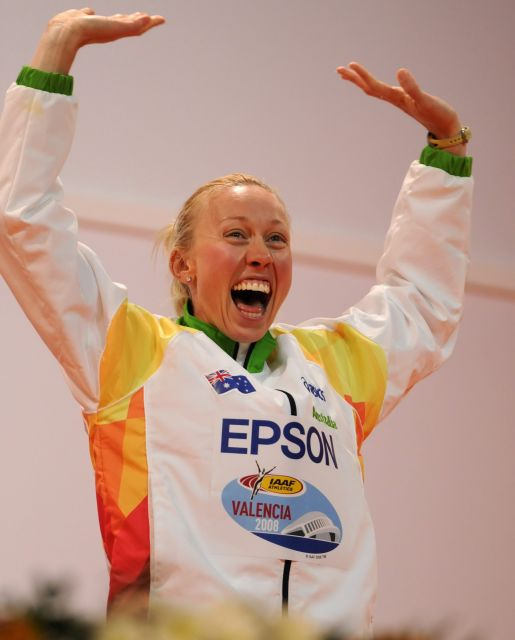
Tamsyn Manou

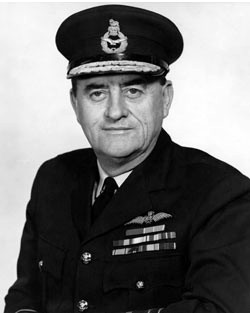
Sir Alister Murdoch

- Tamsyn Manou (1994–96) – Olympic athlete
- Gordon Mathison (1896–1900) – Medical researcher, died in the Battle of Gallipoli
- Noel Maughan (1949–54) – Victorian State politician
- Stuart Maxfield (1984–89) – AFL footballer
- George Arnot Maxwell KC (staff) – barrister; Member of the Australian House of Representatives
- Campbell McComas AM (1964–65) – humorist; writer; actor
- Liam McIntyre (1987–1999) – actor
- John William "Mick" McLaren (1943–1953) – Australian rules footballer with St Kilda
- David McMillan (1970–72) – international drug trafficker who later escaped from Klong Prem Central Prison in Thailand
- Peter McPhee AM (1961–65) – academic
- Andrew McQualter (2002–04) – AFL footballer
- Rod Menzies (1957–63) – entrepreneur
- Agnes Milowka (1994–99) – technical diver, underwater photographer, author, and cave explorer
- David Morgan AO (MMGS 1952–?) – former CEO of the Westpac Banking Corporation
- Shona Morgan (1997–2005) – Olympic gymnast
- John Morrison AM (Staff ?1950–1963) – author; ALS Gold Medal 1963, Patrick White Literary Award 1986
- Sir Alister Murdoch KBE CB (1922–28) – Royal Australian Air Force officer

== N ==
- Stephen Newport (1981–83) – AFL footballer with Melbourne and St Kilda
- Stephen Newton AO (Staff 1993–2011) – principal of Caulfield Grammar School
- Nikolai Nikolaeff (1996–2000) – Australian actor known for Power Rangers Jungle Fury, Daredevil and Stranger Things

== O ==
- William Matthew O'Halloran (student 1950–1953; member of staff 1958–1959; 1963–1966) – Victorian cricketer, and VAFA footballer
- Jenna O'Hea (2005–06) – professional basketball player
- James Ryan O'Neill (born Leigh Anthony Bridgart in 1947) – convicted murderer and suspected serial killer

== P ==
- Barry Patten (1941–43) – corporate architect
- Pete Pearson (1877–1929) – elephant hunter and game ranger
- Tracy Pew (1972–75) – musician, bass player in The Birthday Party
- Bruce Pie (1916–17) – Melbourne footballer; businessman; Queensland politician
- Neil Pope (?–1967) – former Victorian State politician
- Trevor Ashmore Pyman (1924–34) – member of the Australian Delegation to form the United Nations

== R ==
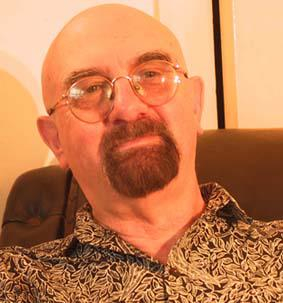
Kenneth G. Ross

- Josh Rachele (2020-2021)– AFL footballer
- Roger Rayson (1947–57) – Victorian cricketer
- Murphy Reid – AFL footballer
- Stanley Simpson Reid (1886–?) – Fitzroy VFA and VFL footballer; minister; soldier; one of the first VFL footballers to die in active service (the Anglo-Boer War, 1901)
- John Robinson (1902–1911) – VFL Footballer; recipient of the Distinguished Conduct Medal (1917)
- Michael Roe (1939–48) – historian
- John Rombotis – AFL footballer with Fitzroy, Port Adelaide, and Richmond
- Kenneth G. Ross (1951–58) – playwright; Hollywood scriptwriter
- Jack Ross – AFL footballer
- Bruce Rowland (1947–58) – composer
- Barry Rowlings (staff) – VFL footballer

== S ==
- John Schultz (1951–55) – VFL footballer, 1960 Brownlow Medallist
- Robert Schultz (1956–1961) – VFL footballer
- Paul Seedsman (2005–2010) – AFL footballer
- Will Setterfield (2014-2016)– AFL football
- David Shallcross (1966–77) – chemistry professor
- Dylan Shiel (2010–2011) – AFL footballer
- Neville Sillitoe (staff) – athletics coach
- Colin Hall Simpson CBE (Mil.) MC (1911) – pharmacist; Army officer; organiser The Association (1947–1952)
- Callum Sinclair (2001–2007) – AFL footballer
- Christopher Skase (1961–67) – controversial Australian businessman; fugitive
- David Smith KCVO AO (MMGS 1940–?) – official Secretary to five Australian Governors-General from 1973 to 1990
- Will Sparks (2006–2010) – Melbourne bounce producer and DJ
- Percival William Stephenson – former Bishop of Nelson
- Allan Stone (1958–60) – Australian tennis player and tennis commentator
- Brooke Stratton (2007–11) – long jumper
- Kristy Stratton – AFLW footballer
- Andrew Strauss OBE (1985–86) – English Test cricketer
- Alan Bishop Stretton AO CBE (1930–1932) – former senior Australian Army officer, VFL footballer, and Australian of the Year (1975)

== T ==
- Melissa Tapper (2005–07) – table tennis player
- Herbert Taylor (1880) – accountant; company director; political party organiser
- Jim Taylor (1948) – VFL footballer
- Lindsay Thompson AO CMG (1929–41) – former Premier of Victoria
- Murray Thompson (1963–72) – Victorian State politician; VFL footballer
- Frank Timson MBE (Mil.) (1916–22) – soldier; businessman; Member of the Australian House of Representatives
- John Twycross (?–1929) – soldier; banker
- John William Twycross (1881–1888) – Australian photographer

== W ==
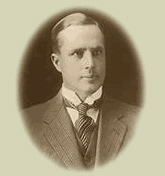
Fred Walker

- Andrew Wailes (1976–1988) – Music Director and Chief Conductor of the Royal Melbourne Philharmonic Choir and Orchestra, musician, performer
- Matthew Wales (1976–85) – convicted murderer
- Andrew Walker (2004) – AFL footballer
- Fred Walker (1899) – entrepreneur, developer of Vegemite
- Ron Walker AC CBE (1944–54) – businessman; former Lord Mayor of Melbourne
- Andrew Walsh AM (1967–72) – festival director
- Geoff Walsh AO (1967–70) – political advisor; diplomat
- Richard Cameron Wardill (1886–1888) – VFA and VFL footballer with Melbourne
- Nick Watson (2022-2023)-AFL Footballer
- Alfred Joseph Watson (1917–19) – athlete who represented Australia in the 1928 and 1936 Olympic Games and the 1938 Empire Games
- James Webster (1931–40) – former Australian Senator
- Richard F. Wicks (1944–1945) – VFL footballer with St Kilda and Stawell Gift finalist (ran fourth) in 1958

== Z ==
- Jack Ziebell (2007-2008)– AFL footballer

== See also ==
- Caulfield Grammarians Football Club
