= Judd Barnett =

The Ven. Ernest Judd Barnett (1859–1955) was Archdeacon of Hong Kong from 1910 to 1925.

He was educated at Trinity College, Melbourne and ordained in 1886.

After curacies in Kew and North Melbourne he was Headmaster of Caulfield Grammar School.

He was Warden of St Stephen's College, Hong Kong before his appointment as Archdeacon; and Rector of Beer Hackett with Thornford afterwards.

== See also ==
- List of Caulfield Grammar School people
