= John Twycross =

Australian photographer

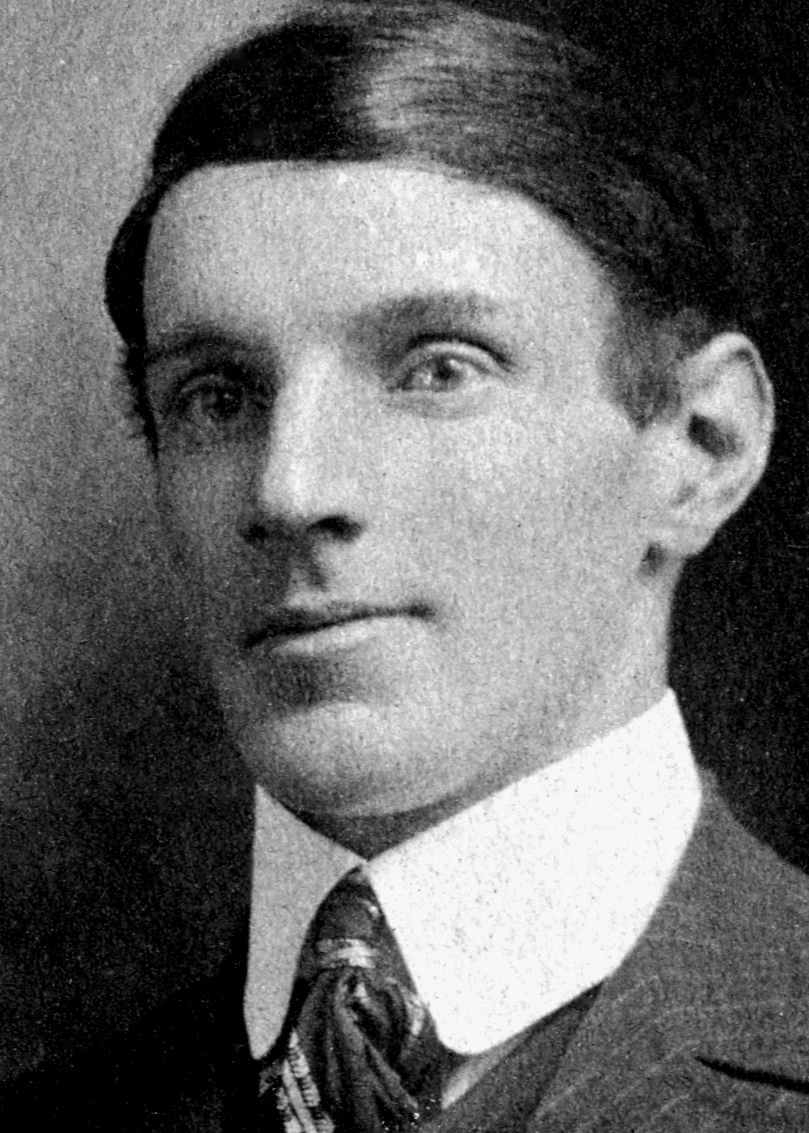
- John William Twycross
- Born: 15 March 1871; St Kilda, Victoria
- Died: 13 December 1936 (aged 65); Elsternwick, Victoria
- Occupation: Australian Pictorialist Photographer
- Spouse: Frances Jane Fox
- Children: John Wilton Twycross
- Parent(s): John Twycross; Charlotte Elizabeth Clutterbuck Twycross

John William Twycross (15 March 1871 — 13 December 1936) was an Australian Pictorialist photographer. His main body of work was produced between 1918 and 1932; and his photographs documented rural scenes, seascapes, working life, and architecture around Port Phillip Bay, and Melbourne.

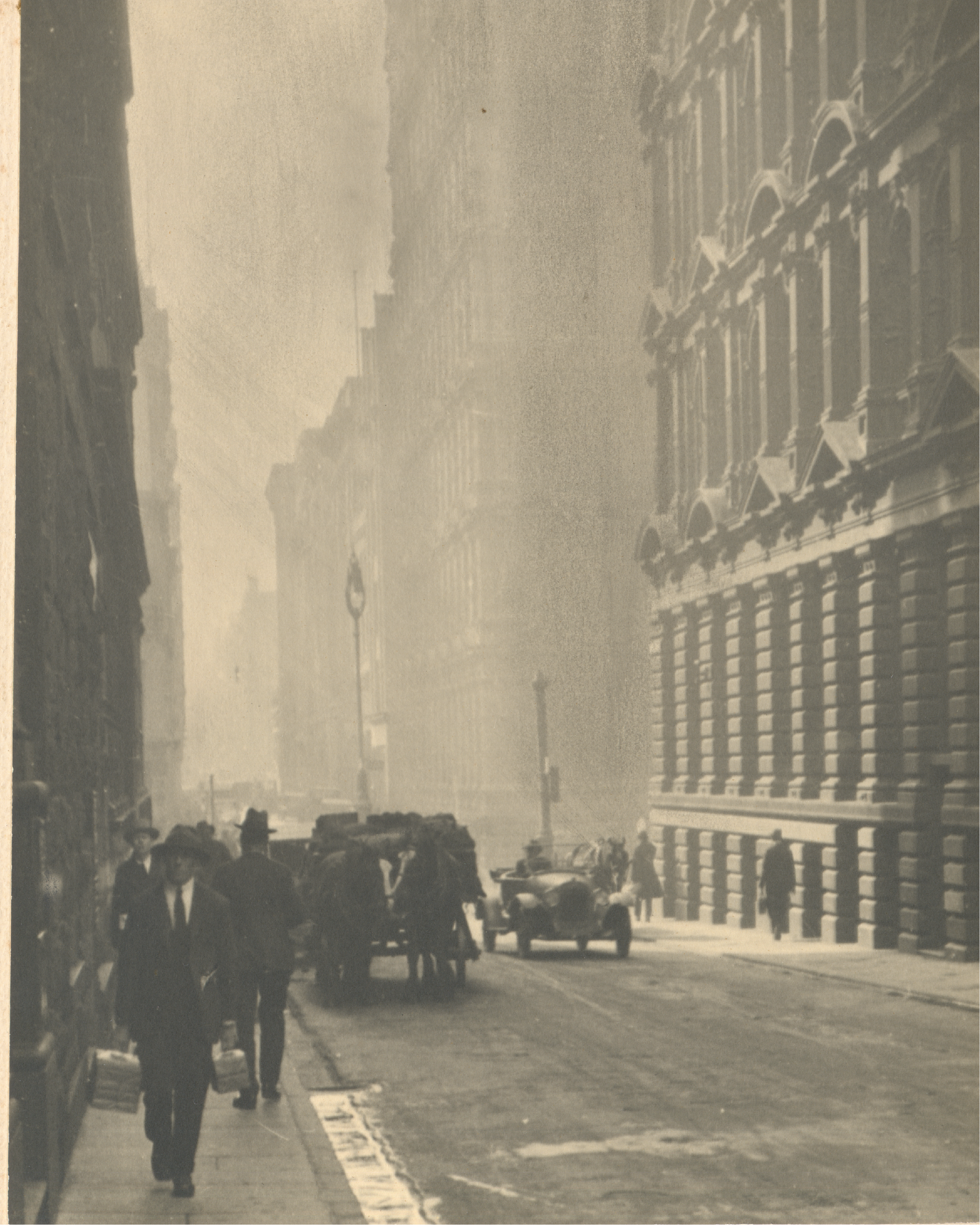
A Melbourne street scene on a business day in 1921 shows the transition from horse and cart to the early motorcar.

== Family ==
The son of John Twycross (1819-1889), a woolmerchant from Wokingham, and Charlotte Elizabeth Clutterbuck Twycross (1834-1908), née Burrell, John William Twycross was born on 15 March 1871 in St Kilda, Victoria. He had one sibling, Ida Lillian Kate Twycross (1874-1943), later Mrs. Peter Kenneth McArthur.

He married Frances Jane Fox (1878-1954) in 1906. They had one child: a son, John Wilton Twycross (1916-2008).

== Early life ==
The Twycross family lived on the corner of Beavis St. and Glenhuntly Rd, and their home "Emmarine", a substantial villa, and one of only four houses between the Elsternwick Railway Station and Kooyong Rd, in what was then the rural district of Elsternwick.

He was among those students who attended Caulfield Grammar School on its first day of operation (i.e., 25 April 1881); and he studied there from 1881 to 1888 (inclusive).

At home, he grew up surrounded by a large Collection of decorative arts and paintings. His father, was an art collector who established much of his collection whilst attending the Melbourne International Exhibition (1880).

== Art Studies ==
Subsequently Twycross studied art at school, his ambition being to paint in Florence. This plan was thwarted by the land crash of 1889. He had to leave school early, and he worked at the Bank of New South Wales until retirement.

Nonetheless, in the years to come he continued to paint, inspired by frequent voyages by paddle steamer across Port Phillip Bay to visit his mother's family, the Burrells of Arthur's Seat, the cattle run they purchased from the McCrae family in 1851. After his parents died, Twycross continued to journey to the Peninsula and to paint there.

== The Photographer ==
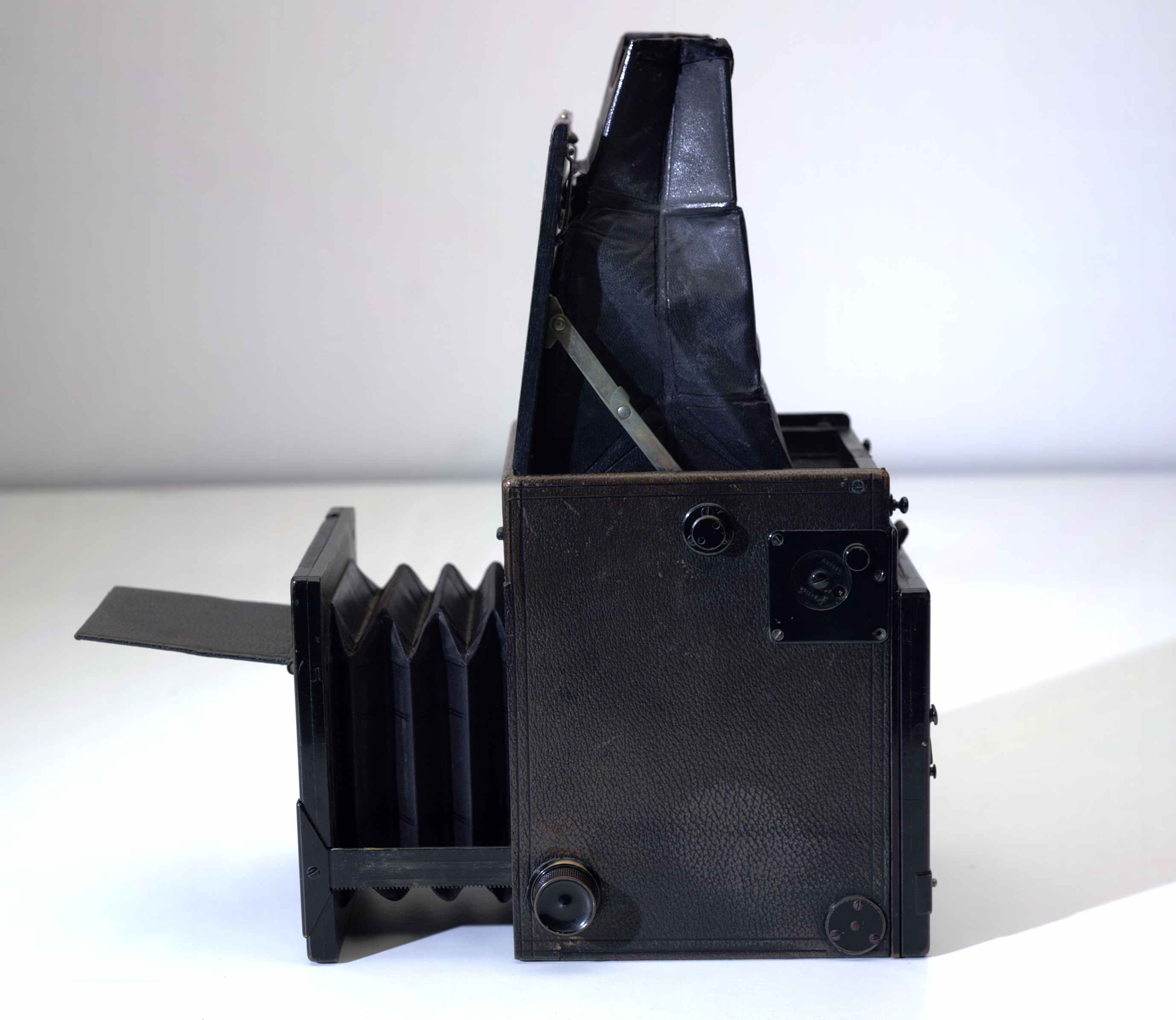
Thornton Pickard Camera with Focal Plane Shutter: 1918.

In 1918 he purchased a Thornton-Pickard Westminster quarter plate camera, and set about documenting his life both around Melbourne and on the Mornington Peninsula.

During his career as a banker based in the city of Melbourne he spent his weekends pursuing photography, often accompanied by his young son. He also photographed the workaday streets of Melbourne, spending his lunch hour capturing the energy of the young and growing city.

He was self-taught as a photographer and as a printer and learned from studying the early photographic journals that were imported from England.

== His Vision ==
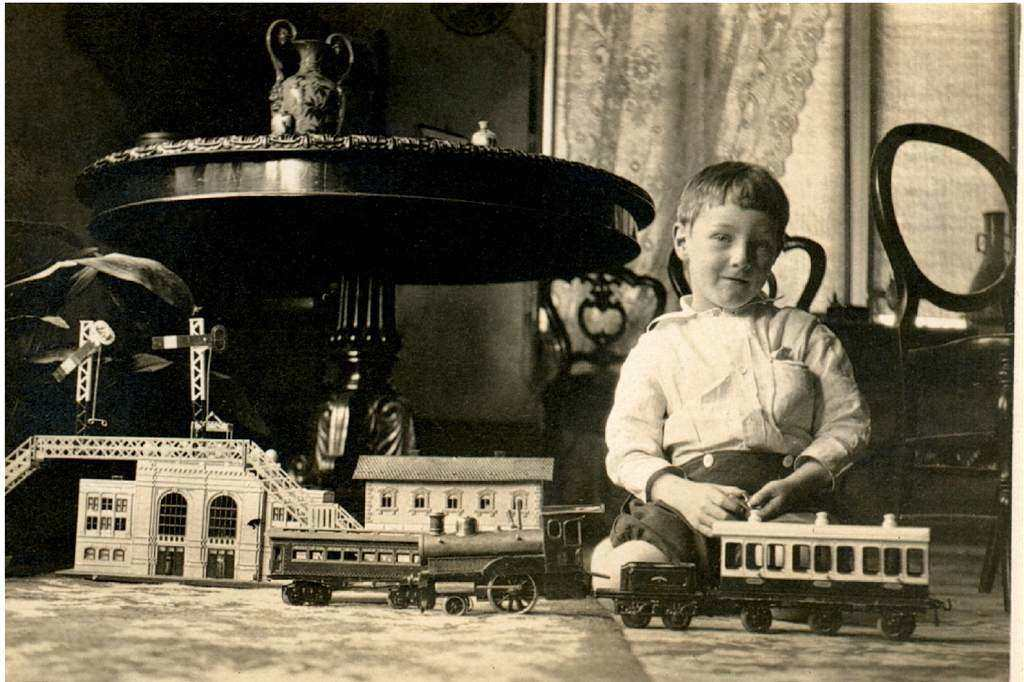
Twycross often photographed his son, who started from a young age to accompany his father on photographic expeditions.

Twycross practiced photography with a sense of purpose that alluded to intentions of capturing a rapidly changing period in time. This was especially true of old Arthur's Seat run, now known as the McCrae Homestead. He used the kitchen at his home in Elsternwick to process his work.

He photographed the Mornington Peninsula before it was populated, capturing the beaches, inlets, and swamps, in an area that has since then, vastly changed.

He never exhibited his work in public. He taught his young son how to use a camera and how to print in the pictorialist style.

== Death ==
He died at his residence, "Emmarine", in Elsternwick, Victoria on 13 December 1936.

== Burrell Twycross Gallery ==
At McCrae Homestead, a National Trust Property, a permanent exhibit "Visions of Port Phillip" displays his work. His photographs were first displayed in public at an exhibit by the National Trust of Australia at Tasma Terrace in 2005.

Another major exhibition of his work "At first sight: Peninsula and bay photographs by J W Twycross 1918–1925" was displayed in March, 2012 at Mornington Peninsula Regional Gallery

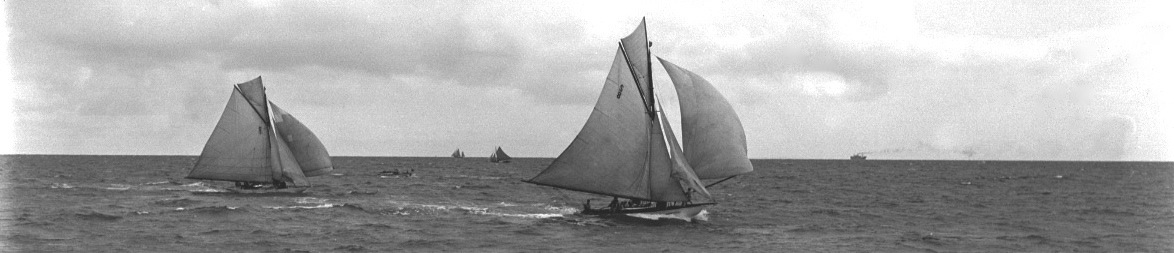
On A windy day, Twycross photographed the yachts he passed from the deck of the ferry, "The Hygeia", bound for Mornington.

== Collections ==
- National Gallery of Victoria Melbourne
- National Trust of Australia

== See also ==
- List of Caulfield Grammar School people
