= Trevor Pyman =

Australian politician

- Born: Trevor Ashman Pyman; 25 December 1916
- Died: 2 April 1995 (aged 78)
- Education: University of Melbourne
- Occupations: Public servant, diplomat

Trevor Ashmore Pyman (25 December 1916 – 2 April 1995) was an Australian diplomat.

== Family ==
The son of Francis George Servante Pyman (1884–1964), and Blanche Ashmore Pyman (1888–1946), née Mitchell, Trevor Ashmore Pyman was born at Ripponlea, Victoria on 25 December 1916. He had two brothers, Clive Francis Henry Pyman (1913–1995), and James Brice Pyman (1923–1987).

Trevor Pyman married Margaret Haddon Hall on 1 August 1942; they had four children, three sons, and a daughter.

== Education ==
Pyman was educated at Caulfield Grammar School, as were his two brothers. He was an excellent schoolboy footballer for CGS, and was dux of the school in 1934.

He attended the University of Melbourne, and attained the following qualifications:

- Bachelor of Arts (B.A.) — in 1938.
- Bachelor of Laws (LL.B.) — in 1940.
- Master of Laws (LL.M.) — in 1944.
- Diploma in Public Administration (Dip.Pub.Admin.) — in 1946.

== Law ==
On 4 September 1945, in the Victorian State High Court, Pyman was admitted to practise as a barrister and solicitor.

== Military ==
He served in the Second AIF from November 1941 to October 1944; and he remained "on strength" until he was retired (effective date 30 December 1971) at the end of 1971.

== Diplomat ==
Pyman joined the Australian Diplomatic Service in 1944; having been discharged from the army to do so.

During his fourteen-year tenure in the diplomatic service he worked with Dr Evatt as part of the Australian Delegation to form the United Nations.

He later worked as Australia's Acting High Commissioner to Ottawa, Ontario, Canada, and as Head of Chancery and Counsellor at the Australian Embassy in Washington, D.C. While in Washington he also served as one of Australia's representatives to the United Nations General Assembly in New York City.

== Retired ==
He was retired from the Public Service, on medical grounds, in December 1977.

== Australian Outlook ==
Pyman's influential article, "The United Nations Secretary-Generalship: A Review of its Status, Functions and Role", written immediately after the (September 1961) death of the U.N. Secretary-General, Dag Hammarskjöld, in a plane crash in Northern Rhodesia, was published in Australian Outlook, now known as the Australian Journal of International Affairs, in December 1961.

== See also ==
- List of Caulfield Grammar School people
