= Alexander Charles Cumming =

Alexander Charles Cumming OBE FRSE FIC (12 August 1880 – 28 September 1940), usually credited as A. C. Cumming, was an Australian analytical chemist and textbook author.

== Biography ==
Cumming was born in Melbourne, Australia on 12 August 1880. He attended Caulfield Grammar School. He attended the University of Melbourne graduating BSc in 1902 and obtaining a DSc in 1905. In 1908 he went to Edinburgh in Scotland to lecture in chemistry, later technical chemistry, at the University of Edinburgh. At that time he is listed as living at 16 Kilmaurs Terrace, just off Dalkeith Road in south-west Edinburgh.

In May 1914, he was elected a Fellow of the Royal Society of Edinburgh. His proposers were Sir James Walker, Leonard Dobbin, Alexander Lauder and William Cramer.

In the First World War he was involved in the manufacture of TNT at the Lothian Chemical Company on Broughton Road, then moved to HM Explosives Factory at Craigleith on the west side of the city. He was awarded the Order of the British Empire (OBE) in the 1918 Birthday Honours for his war work.

In 1921, he left Edinburgh and university life for employment in Macfie & Sons Sugar Refinery in Liverpool, and within three years he was managing director of the company.

He retired to Wales in 1938 and died there of heart failure on a shooting trip on 28 September 1940.

== Publications ==
- On the Potential Due to Liquid Contact (1913)
- The Manufacture of Acids and Alkalis (1924)
- The Manufacture of Sulphuric Acid (1925)
- A Textbook of Quantitative Chemical Analysis
- Practical Chemistry for Medical Students
- An Old Minute Book - The Edinburgh Sugarhouse Co 1763 to 1773

== See also ==
- List of Caulfield Grammar School people
