= Philip Lewis Griffiths =

Australian judge

Philip Lewis Griffiths

Philip Lewis Griffiths KC (30 September 1881 – 4 June 1945) was an eminent Australian jurist.

== Education ==
Educated at Caulfield Grammar School, he studied for a Master of Arts degree at the Trinity College of the University of Melbourne.

== Journalist ==
He then wrote for The Mercury in both Hobart and Launceston.

== Law ==
He studied law at the University of Tasmania, earning an LLB. While working as a lawyer, he also lectured at the University of Tasmania from 1913 to 1930, focusing on torts and criminal law.

In 1930 Griffiths was appointed as the Solicitor-General of Tasmania, and in August 1933 he was made a King's Counsel. From August 1938 to March 1939 Griffiths was acting Chief Judge of the Mandated Territory of New Guinea; he then became the Second Judge of New Guinea, serving in the acting Chief Judge position again during 1940.

== Death ==
He died, in Hobart, on 4 June 1945.

== See also ==
- List of Caulfield Grammar School people
