= John William McLaren =

John William McLaren may refer to:

- John McLaren (cricketer) (1886–1921), Australian cricketer
- Mick McLaren (footballer) (1936–2014), Australian rules footballer
