= Russell Basser =

Australian water polo player

Personal information
- Born: March 20, 1960 (age 65) Melbourne, Australia

Sport
- Sport: Water polo

Russell Basser (born 20 March 1960) is an Australian former water polo player who competed in the 1984 Summer Olympics.

He is Jewish, and played in the Maccabiah Games in Israel in the 1980s. In 1985 he was named the Australian Jewish Sportsman of the Year. He was a torchbearer in Australia for the 2000 Sydney Olympics.

Basser went to Caulfield Grammar from 1972 to 1977. He graduated from the University of Melbourne in Medicine, trained as an oncologist and worked in academic medicine at Royal Melbourne Hospital and Western Hospitals. He later joined biopharmaceutical company CSL Limited, where he was in charge of clinical trials and later was in charge of vaccine research and Development. He retired in 2022.

== See also ==
- List of Caulfield Grammar School people
