= Andrew Walsh (disambiguation) =

Andrew Walsh is an Australian festival director.

Andrew or Andy Walsh may also refer to:

- Andrew Walsh (politician) (1838-1889), Irish-American politician and judge
- Andy Walsh (born 1970), English footballer, see List of Bury F.C. players (1–24 appearances)
