= Austin Burton Edwards =

Australian mineralogist and petrologist

- Born: 15 August 1909; Caulfield, Victoria, Australia
- Died: 8 October 1960 (aged 51); Rome, Italy
- Education: Caulfield Grammar School; University of Melbourne
- Spouse: Eileen Mary McDonnell (m. 1935)
- Awards: Clarke Medal (1960)
- Scientific career
- Fields: Geology; Petrology, Microscopy
- Workplaces: University of Melbourne, CSIRO

Austin Burton Edwards (15 August 1909 – 8 October 1960) was an Australian geologist, winner of the Clarke Medal in 1960.

== Family ==
The son of William Burton Edwards, the Commissioner of the Federal Public Service, and his second wife, Mabel Edwards, née Mueller, Austin Burton Edwards was born in Caulfield on 15 August 1909.

He married Eileen Mary McDonnell, in Adelaide, on 22 April 1935. They had four children.

== Caulfield Grammar School ==
He was educated at Caulfield Grammar School from 1916 to 1927—representing the school in both swimming and athletics over a number of years—where he was both School Captain and Dux of School in 1926.

He was a member of the Caulfield Grammar School Council for 12 years, from 1949 until his death in 1960.

== Sportsman ==
=== Football ===
On 17 April 1931 he was awarded a "half-blue" for football by the University of Melbourne.

In June 1931, while playing with Old Caulfield Grammarians in C-Section of the Metropolitan Amateur Football Association, he was chosen (as a back-pocket resting ruckman), to play for a Combined C-Section team, against a Combined B-Section team as a curtain raiser to the inter-State amateur football match between Victoria and South Australia, on the MCG. He was one of the best on the ground.

=== Athletics ===
While studying at the Royal College of Science he was awarded "colours" in athletics.

== Tertiary education ==
=== Melbourne University ===
He studied at the University of Melbourne, graduating Bachelor of Science (B.Sc.) with First-Class Honours in Geology on 12 April 1930.

In 1942, with 12 years having elapsed since his graduation as B.Sc., he was awarded a Doctor of Science (D.Sc.), on the basis of his submission of "42 published papers, covering work in petrology, economic geology and physiography". He graduated on 21 December 1942.

=== Royal College of Science ===
Having won a 1851 Royal Exhibition Scholarship for Science Research and free passage to England in 1932, he studied at the Royal College of Science at Imperial College London, and graduated Doctor of Philosophy (Ph.D.) and Diploma of Imperial College (D.I.C.) in 1934.

== C.S.I.R.O. ==
Soon after his return to Australia, he was appointed Research Officer in the mineragraphic section of the Council for Scientific and Industrial Research (C.S.I.R.) in 1935. In the process, he became the associate of Frank L. Stillwell (1888-1963); and on Stllwell's retirement in 1953, Edwards became officer-in-charge of the mineragraphic section of what had become the Commonwealth Scientific and Industrial Research Organisation (C.S.I.R.O.).

From 1941 to 1955 Edwards, while still at C.S.I.R., lectured part-time in geology at the University of Melbourne, occasionally offering postgraduate lectures.

== Death ==
He collapsed and died in Rome on 8 October 1960 while on a working visit to Europe. He is buried in Rome's Cimitero Acattolico Non-Catholic Cemetery tomb 878.

== Works ==
For details of his more than 100 journal articles, see Stillwell (1961), pp. 492–496.

- Edwards, A.B. (1932), "The Geology and Petrology of the Black Spur Area, Healesville", Proceedings of the Royal Society of Victoria, Volume 44, Part I, pp.49-76. (Read to the Royal Society of Victoria on 11 June 1931.)
- Edwards, A.B. (1932), "The Geology and Petrology of the Warburton Area, Victoria", Volume 44, Part II, pp.163-181. (Read to the Royal Society of Victoria on 12 November 1931.)
- Edwards, A.B. (1932), "On the Dacite-Granodiorite Contact Relations in the Warburton Area", Volume 44, Part II, pp.182-199. (Read to the Royal Society of Victoria on 10 December 1931.)
- Edwards, A.B. (1947), Textures of the Ore Minerals and their Significance, Melbourne: Australasian Institute of Mining and Metallurgy.
- Edwards, A.B. (ed.) (1953), Geology of Australian Ore Deposits: Fifth Empire Mining and Metallurgical Congress, Australia and New Zealand, 1953: A Symposium arranged by a Committee of the Australasian Institute of Mining and Metallurgy, Melbourne: Office of the Congress and of the Australasian Institute of Mining and Metallurgy.
- Edwards, A.B. (1954), Textures of the Ore Minerals and their Significance (Second Edition), Melbourne: Australasian Institute of Mining and Metallurgy.

== See also ==
- List of Caulfield Grammar School people

== Notes ==
Awards
Preceded by Tom Iredale	Clarke Medal; 1960	Succeeded by Charles Austin Gardner
