= Irving Davidson =

Australian rules footballer (1929–2022)

Personal information
- Full name: Irving William Davidson
- Born: 30 April 1929
- Died: 14 April 2022 (aged 92)
- Original team: Caulfield Grammar
- Height: 185 cm (6 ft 1 in)
- Weight: 83 kg (183 lb)

Playing career^{1}
| Years | Club | Games (Goals) |
| 1951–54 | St Kilda (VFL) | 26 (1) |
| 1955–56 | Brighton (VFA) | 12 (10) |
- ^{1} Playing statistics correct to the end of 1956.

Irving Davidson (30 April 1929 – 14 April 2022) was an Australian rules footballer who played with St Kilda in the Victorian Football League (VFL).

== Family ==
The son of William Irving Davidson (1894–1950), and Doris Irene Davidson, née Dobbie (1895–1977), Irving William Davidson was born on 30 April 1929.

He married Catherine Jean Robertson in 1960.

== Education ==
He attended Caulfield Grammar School from 1943 to 1948.

== Football ==
=== Caulfield Grammarians (VAFA) ===
He played with the Caulfield Grammarians Football Club in the Victorian Amateur Football Association (VAFA) in 1949.

=== St Kilda (VFL) ===
Cleared from Caulfield Grammarians in April 1950, he played 26 senior games with St Kilda in the VFL over four seasons (1951 to 1954), kicking one goal.

=== Brighton (VFA) ===
He played in 12 senior matches, scoring 10 goals, over two seasons (1955—1956) with the Brighton Football Club in the Victorian Football Association (VFA).

== Death ==
He died on 14 April 2022.

== See also ==
- List of Caulfield Grammar School people
