= Murray Johnstone =

Australian rules footballer

Personal information
- Full name: Samuel Thomas Murray Johnstone
- Born: 19 May 1925
- Died: 21 July 2012 (aged 87); Canberra
- Original team: Caulfield Old Grammarians
- Height: 187 cm (6 ft 2 in)
- Weight: 89 kg (196 lb)

Playing career^{1}
Years	Club	Games (Goals)
1945	St Kilda	3 (2)
- ^{1} Playing statistics correct to the end of 1945.

Samuel Thomas Murray Johnstone (19 May 1925 – 21 July 2012) was an Australian rules footballer who played with St Kilda in the Victorian Football League (VFL).

== Education ==
He attended Caulfield Grammar School.

== See also ==
- List of Caulfield Grammar School people
