= Herbert Taylor (Australian politician) =

Australian politician

Herbert Taylor, CMG (11 May 1885 – 24 July 1970) was an Australian political party organiser, accountant, and company director.

== Life and political career ==
Taylor was born in Malmsbury, Victoria, eldest of five children of Ralph Herbert William Taylor, a schoolteacher, and Alice Ann French. Both of Herbert Taylor's parents were born and raised in Victoria. From 1896 the family lived in Ormond, Victoria.

=== Marriage ===
Herbert Taylor and Doris Brock (died 1966) were married on 8 May 1919, at the Congregational Church, Brighton, Victoria; the couple had three sons.

=== Career ===
In 1902, at the age of 17, Taylor left Caulfield Grammar School and began work as a clerk at a chemical manufacturer. In 1905, three years later, Taylor joined an accountancy firm, which sent him to open their Perth office in 1907. In 1913, Taylor became senior audit clerk with a Melbourne firm of accountants, Young & Outhwaite. He secured his permanent career with a partnership in 1917; he was to become senior partner upon A. H. Outhwaite's retirement in 1947.

A founding (1928) fellow of the Institute of Chartered Accountants in Australia, Herbert Taylor (from 1933) was one of two inaugural vice-presidents of the offshoot Australian Chartered Accountants Research Society of Victoria. Its object was to bring members of the institute together, "professionally, socially and in various forms of sport". Under the society's auspices, Taylor published two booklets, The Organisation of a Chartered Accountant's Office (1933) and The Audit of Sharebrokers' Accounts (1937).

Taylor joined the Institute of Public Affairs and was to serve on its council in 1945–66. In 1944, as an I.P.A. nominee, he chaired several meetings of Victorian political groups opposed to the Australian Labor Party and reported the outcome to Robert Menzies. These meetings preceded Menzies' conventions — in Canberra in October and at Albury in December 1944, which led to the formation of the Australian Liberal Party.

He served on the Liberal Party's finance committee and became a trustee of the State branch. After two years as president of the Associated Chambers of Commerce of Australia, he voiced in April 1947 the Liberal stance against the rise of what he called "autocratic Socialism", deploring worker intimidation by an extremist minority of trade union leaders and calling on Australians to restore "the desire to do good work".

== Affiliations ==
- Taylor was chairman of the University of Melbourne's finance committee in the early 1950s. He also was treasurer (1950–55), vice-president (1956–61) and president (1961–65) of the Royal Automobile Club of Victoria. He became a fellow of the Institute of Directors, London.
- By invitation, he joined the international Senior Golfers' Society and the Royal and Ancient Golf Club of St Andrews, Scotland.
- The Royal Victorian Institute for the Blind and the Freemasons' Hospital both made him a life governor.

== Honours ==
In 1959 he was appointed Companion of the Order of St Michael and St George.

== Death ==
Herbert Taylor died on 24 July 1970 in East Melbourne, aged 85, and was cremated. He was survived by his three sons. His wife died in 1966.

== See also ==
- List of Caulfield Grammar School people
