= Shallcross (surname) =

Shallcross is a surname. Notable people with the surname include:

- Alan Shallcross (1932–2010), British television producer
- Arthur Shallcross (1876–1950), British association football manager
- David Shallcross, Australian academic
- Dudley Shallcross, British academic
- Mary Ann Shallcross Smith (born 1952), American educator and politician
- Robert Shallcross, American film director, screenwriter and advertising writers.
