= Stephen Hibbert Newton =

Australian teacher (born 1955)

Stephen Hibbert Newton (born 25 April 1955) AO is an Australian teacher, who served as Principal of Caulfield Grammar School (1993–2011) and Hamilton College (1986–1993) in Victoria.

Stephen Hibbert Newton was born in Melbourne on 25 April 1955 to Hibbert Richard Newton and Judith Mary Newton (née Williams). Consequently, by an extraordinary coincidence, both Newton and Caulfield Grammar School, founded on 25 April 1881, share the same birthday.

Newton attended Scotch College, and was a classroom teacher prior to becoming a principal.

During his term as Principal at Caulfield, the school became coeducational across all campuses, and opened a campus in Nanjing, China to host its internationalism programme.

In 2010, Newton won the Sir James Darling Medal from the Australian College of Educators for his outstanding and sustained contribution to Victorian education, and the Jiangsu Friendship Award, which is the Chinese province's highest award for foreign citizens. He received one of six 2011 John Laing Professional Development Awards from Principals Victoria. He was named as an Officer of the Order of Australia in 2012, for "distinguished service to education in the independent schools sector, through executive roles with professional organisations and advisory bodies, and to the development of educational development opportunities with China."

== See also ==
- List of Caulfield Grammar School people
