= David Shallcross =

Australian academic

David Shallcross is an Australian academic.

He was educated at Caulfield Grammar School, before studying for both his bachelor's degree and Ph.D. at the University of Melbourne. He is currently a Professor in the Department of Chemical and Biomolecular Engineering and Director of the Engineering Learning Unit at the University of Melbourne.

David is Editor-in-Chief of the education research journal, Education for chemical engineers and a former Qualifications Vice-President of the Institution of Chemical Engineers (IChemE).

David Shallcross was awarded the 2006 Frank Morton Medal by the Institution of Chemical Engineers (IChemE). The medal, awarded biannually, "provides professional recognition by IChemE for excellence in chemical engineering education".

== See also ==
- List of Caulfield Grammar School people
