= McCrae Homestead =

Heritage-listed house in Melbourne, Victoria, Australia

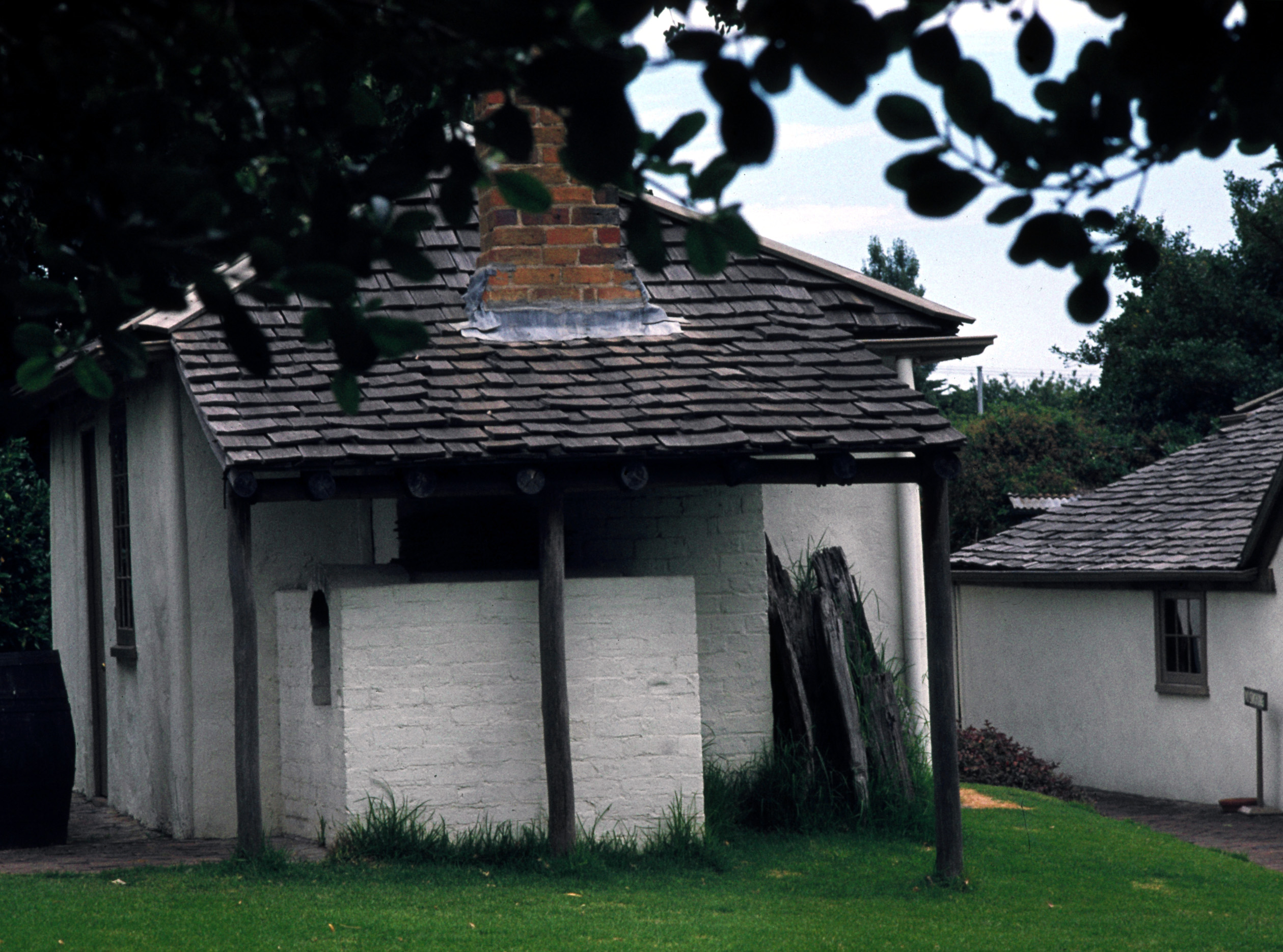
- The homestead in 1979

- Location of the homestead in Greater Metropolitan Melbourne
- Alternative names: Arthur's Seat Run
- Etymology: McCrae family

General information
- Status: Completed
- Type: Homestead; cottage
- Architectural style: Early Victorian
- Location: 6-8 Charles Street, McCrae, Mornington Peninsula, Victoria, Australia
- Coordinates: 38°20′59″S 144°55′53″E
- Completed: c. 1844; 182 years ago
- Client: McCrae family
- Owner: McCrae family (1844–1851); Burrell family (1851–1925); Williams family (1927–1938); anor (1938–1961); George Gordon McCrae (1961–1970); National Trust of Australia (Victoria) (since 1970)

Technical details
- Structural system: Drop slab
- Material: Local timbers; wattle and daub; bark; shingle roof
- Grounds: 8,640 ha (21,360 acres) (in the 1840s)

Website
- nationaltrust.org.au

Victorian Heritage Register
- Official name: McCrae Homestead
- Type: Registered place
- Designated: 9 October 1974
- Reference no.: H0291
- Heritage overlay no.: HO42
- Categories: Farming and Grazing; Residential buildings (private)

Register of the National Estate
- Official name: McCrae Homestead
- Type: Defunct register
- Designated: 21 March 1978
- Reference no.: 5792

The McCrae Homestead, also known as Arthur's Seat Run during the Victorian era, is a heritage-listed cottage homestead and adjacent history museum, located in McCrae, a settlement on the Mornington Peninsula, in the greater metropolitan Melbourne area, in Victoria, Australia.

The homestead was added to the Victorian Heritage Register on 9 October 1974 as an important example of an early Victorian homestead; and was also added to non-statutory lists by the Victorian branch of the National Trust on 8 May 1973 and the now defunct Register of the National Estate on 21 March 1978. The homestead has been owned and operated by the Victorian branch of the National Trust since 1970, and is open to the public.

== History ==
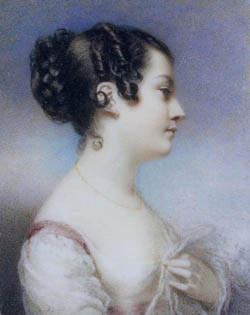
Self portrait of Georgiana McCrae in 1824, aged 20

The homestead was built on 8,640 hectares (21,360 acres) at the foot of Arthurs Seat, a small mountain, near the shores of Port Phillip in c. 1844 – c. 1845 by Andrew McCrae, a lawyer, and his wife, Georgiana Huntly McCrae, a notable portrait artist and Victorian-era diarist.

=== McCrae family ===
The McCrae family were early settlers to the new colony of Victoria, Australia. Andrew McCrae arrived from England in 1839, and his wife, Georgiana, also emigrated in 1841 with their four young sons. Their eldest son, George Gordon (1833–1927) recorded many of his experiences at Arthur's Seat both in diary form and as sketches and paintings; as did his mother. They were one of the first families to settle on the Mornington Peninsula and they built their new home near the future location of the McCrae Lighthouse, overlooking Port Phillip. The McCrae family also knew Arthur's Seat as Wango, the name given by the Bunurong to the large granite outcrop.

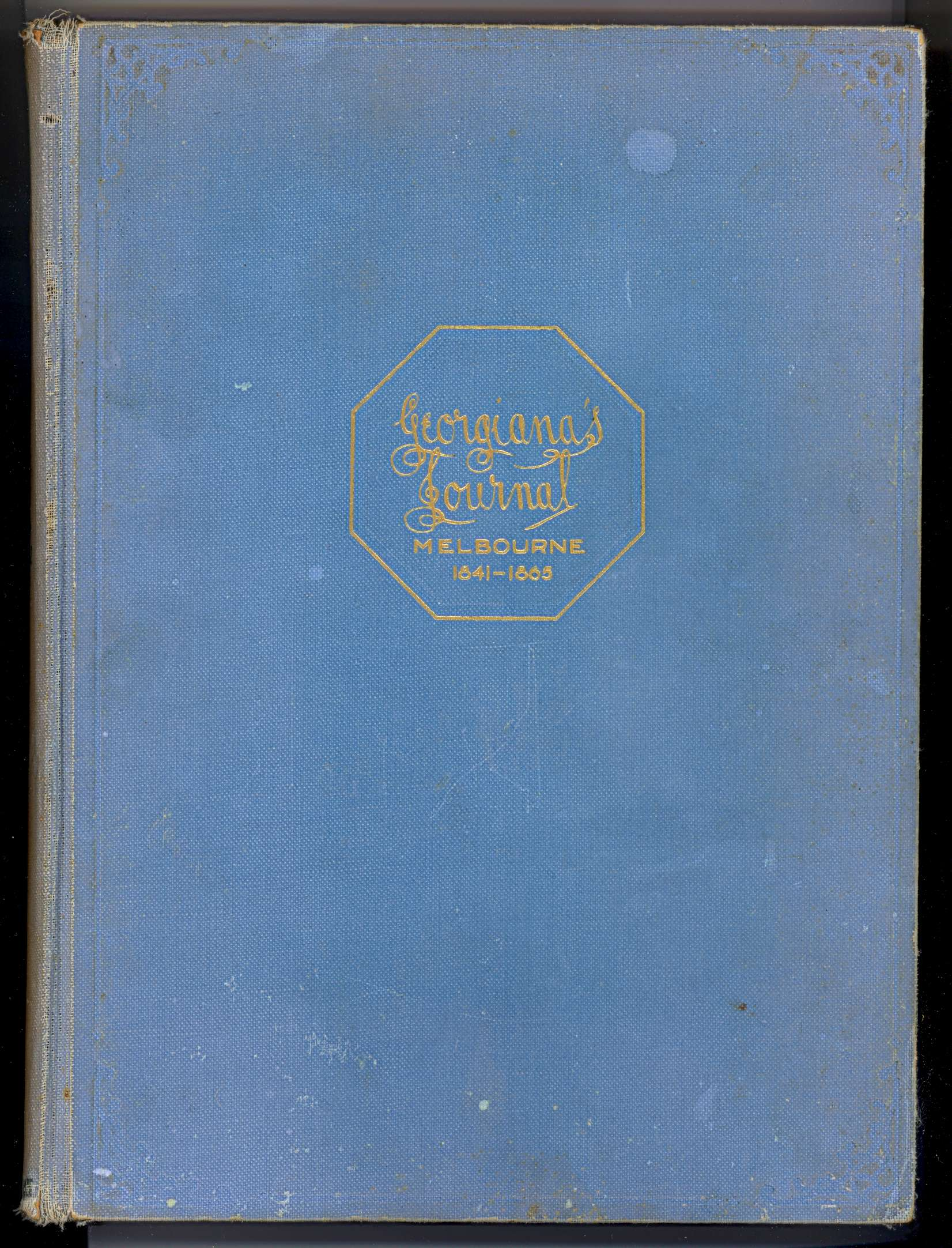
Georgiana's Journal: Melbourne, a Hundred Years Ago, 1841–1865, edited by Hugh McCrae, and published in 1934

In 1934, one of Georgiana McCrae's grandsons, the poet Hugh, published her journals, under the title Georgiana's Journal. The journal chronicled her pre–departure from England in 1838 on the Argyle in 1840 to the year 1865, including the years at Arthur's Seat from 1844 to 1851. Letters included in the diary that she received from Arthur's Seat from her children, George Gordon, Willie, Sandy, and Perry who were sent on ahead of their parents from Melbourne, with their tutor John McClure, express their excitement as they helped build huts, fished from the beach below the homestead and explored what was then a pristine environment teeming with bush creatures. They also befriended the Bunurong, the indigenous people of the Port Phillip area who taught them their language and songs. The four boys learned how to fish with wooden spears. In 1847, George McCrae wrote a detailed description of a Corroboree.

John McClure was born on the Isle of Skye and had received an education in the classics and therefore the McCrae's sons received a fine education in conjunction with living a pioneer lifestyle. The Schoolhouse, one of the original huts on the property, was nicknamed "The University of Arthur's Seat", also referred to later by this same title by the Burrell family children. In the 1920s John William Twycross made a pictorial photograph of the hut. A watercolour painting by Edward La Trobe Bateman, in the late 1850s, was entitled "Mr McClure's Hut."

In her diaries, Georgiana McCrae wrote extensively about life at the McCrae Homestead, including:

==== Construction of the homestead ====
"It is more than a year since we squatted, or as the aborigines say, Quambied (camped) on Arthur's Seat - the antipodes of that ilk. Our house is built of gum-tree slabs supported, horizontally, by grooved corner-posts, and the same artifice (used again) for windows and doors. The biggest room has been furnished with a table and chairs, but no pictures - long lines of actual landscape appearing in interstices between the planks, instead! In addition to the house proper, we have recently erected a suite of wattle and daub rooms, which only need plastering."

— Georgiana McCrae, Georgiana's Journal, 19 July 1846

The interior rooms of the homestead that were completed soon after this reflect Georgiana McCrae's artistry and good taste in design and furnishings. It is furnished with original artefacts and furniture handed down by Georgiana McCrae to her descendants.

==== The view ====
"......Situated on a terrace of sandy soil, about two hundred yards up from the beach, we command a view of Shortlands Bluff lighthouse, the two points...Nepean and Lonsdale...and, in clear weather, Cape Otway, faintly sustained in the west."

— Georgiana McCrae, Georgiana's Journal

This view was subsequently obscured by development although it can still be viewed from Seawinds, at Arthurs Seat State Park, further up the mountain above the homestead.

==== The life of a pioneer woman ====
"Dead calm. The bay like a mirror. Lanty and Neale went out to fish. Tuck fastened the two halves of our door to the hinges, thus excluding the dogs and geese; also Master Tommy. Obliged to give up my last packet of sperm candles, otherwise the school-hut will have to close on account of darkness."

— Georgiana McCrae, Georgiana's Journal, 22 July 1845

"Since the flour sacks are full of holes, I have removed my dresses from the tinned chest and filled it with flour instead."

— Georgiana McCrae, Georgiana's Journal, 23 July 1845

"While the boys were away at the beach, I heard somebody shout excitedly, five or six times, and, on going out of the house, I noticed Mr McLure ahead of me, running towards the saw-pit. I followed as fast as I could and was astonished to see our dray, tipped up, with the two shafter-bullocks hanging by the bows from the pole which had become caught in a native "cherry."

— Georgiana McCrae, Georgiana's Journal, 23 January 1850

"Mr Courtney measured our heights on the wall of the dining-room, as follows:

- Fanny — Two years old, less 14 days, 2 feet 8 inches
- Poppety — Five years, less 19 days, 3 feet 4 inches
- Lucia — Seven years and a half, 4 feet
- Perry — Ten years, seven months, 4 feet 3 3/4 inches
- Willie — Fourteen and a half, 4 feet 7 inches
- Sandy — Twelve and a half, 4 feet, 11 1/2 inches
- George — Sixteen years, 5 feet 2 1/2 inches
- I, myself, me — 5 feet 3 1/2 inches
- Mr. McLure — 5 feet 7 inches
- Mr. Courtney, and Mr. McCrae — 5 feet 10 inches"

— Georgiana McCrae, Georgiana's Journal, Arthurs's Seat, 6 June 1849

The McCrae family resided at the homestead from 1844 to 1851.

"Yet a deeper sorrow has now arrived when I must say good-bye to my mountain home, the house I have built, the garden I have formed."

— Georgiana McCrae, Georgiana's Journal, Arthur's Seat, 6 October 1851

=== Burrell family ===
Ambrotype glass-plate photograph, 1857. Back: Henry Burrell, Charlotte Baker, Katherine Burrell, Joseph John Burrell. Seated: Joseph Brookes Burrell, Charles Burrell (on knee), Charlotte Burrell, Brookes Burrell

In 1851 the Burrell family arrived in Melbourne from Bury St Edmunds in England and soon purchased Arthur's Seat Run from the McCrae family where they lived and farmed cattle and sheep until 1925, when Kate Burrell, the last of their children died. Evidence of their occupation is seen within the homestead in the newspapers lining one of the bedroom walls that were published in Bury St Edmunds. Being so close to Port Phillip Bay, the drop slab house was drafty in the winter. George Gordon McCrae, who had spent childhood days at the homestead, continued to visit the Burrell family, as evidenced in several letters and photographs. The Burrell family were not able to keep the homestead and it then passed out of the family.

Both the McCrae family and members of the Burrell family were deeply attached to Arthur's Seat Run, as it was then called, and maintain strong ties to the homestead. Ownership by the National Trust of Australia has preserved the homestead and its stories as part of Victoria's history.

== Description ==
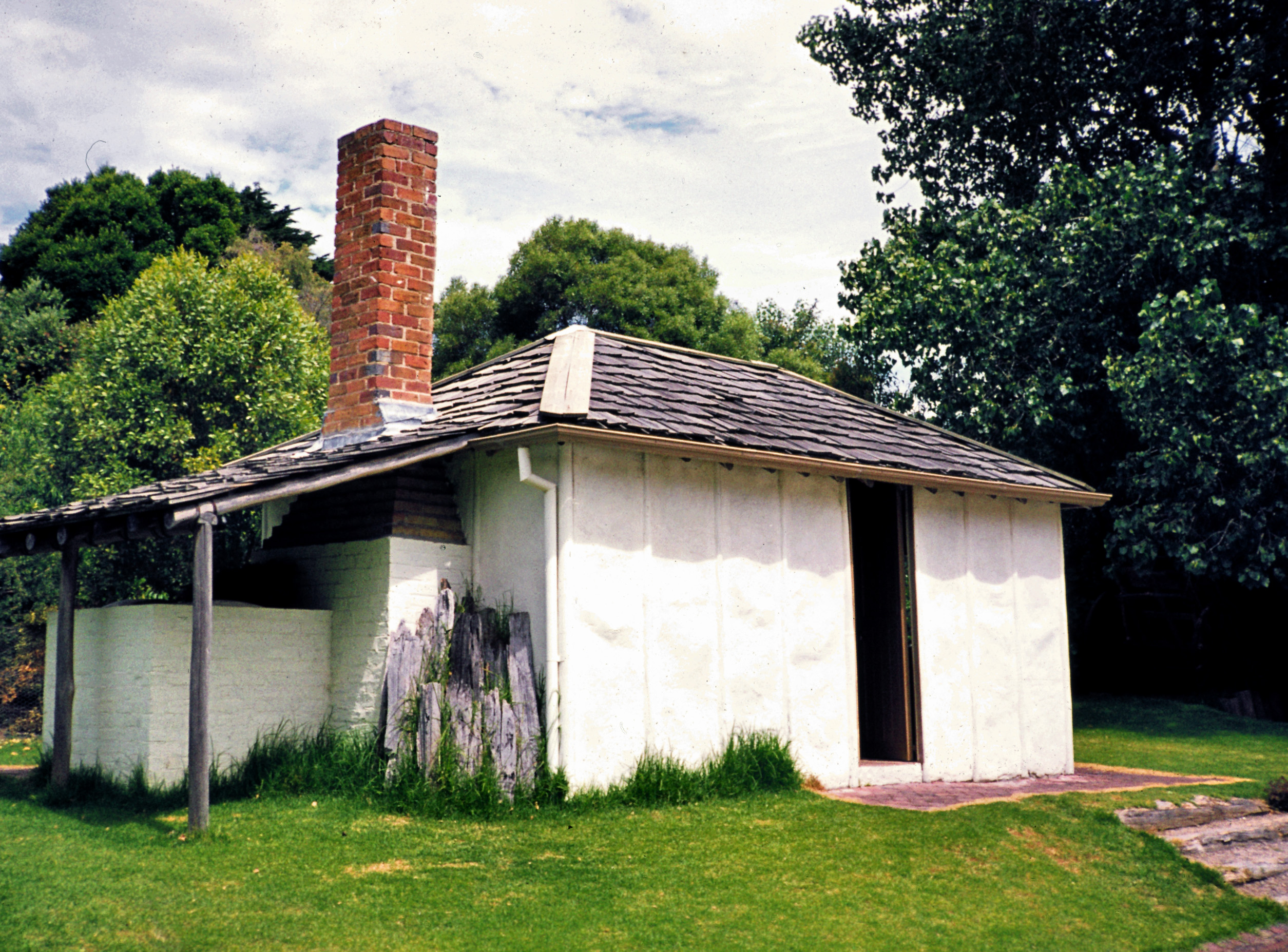
The cottage homestead, in 1979, prior to extensive restoration

One of Victoria's oldest homesteads, the homestead illustrates how early pioneers used whatever they found locally to build houses and farms using primitive construction techniques. The walls of the house are made of horizontal drop slab cut from local timbers including stringybark from the top of the mountain. Tuck, who was employed by the McCrae fmily and assisted by the older sons, used wattle and daub, bark, messmate shingles and sods as well as slabs and squared logs.

Georgiana McCrae designed the house and each detail such as the Count Rumford fireplace. The three thousand bricks necessary to build it were sent down Port Phillip Bay from Williamstown to Arthurs Seat on the Jemima, a small sailing boat. The house is small and well thought out with a separate kitchen as was common at that time to prevent fires. A floorplan drawn up by Georgiana in 1850 exactly reflects the present layout of the homestead with a small addition being done on the side of the house in the twentieth century.

=== Provenance and restoration ===
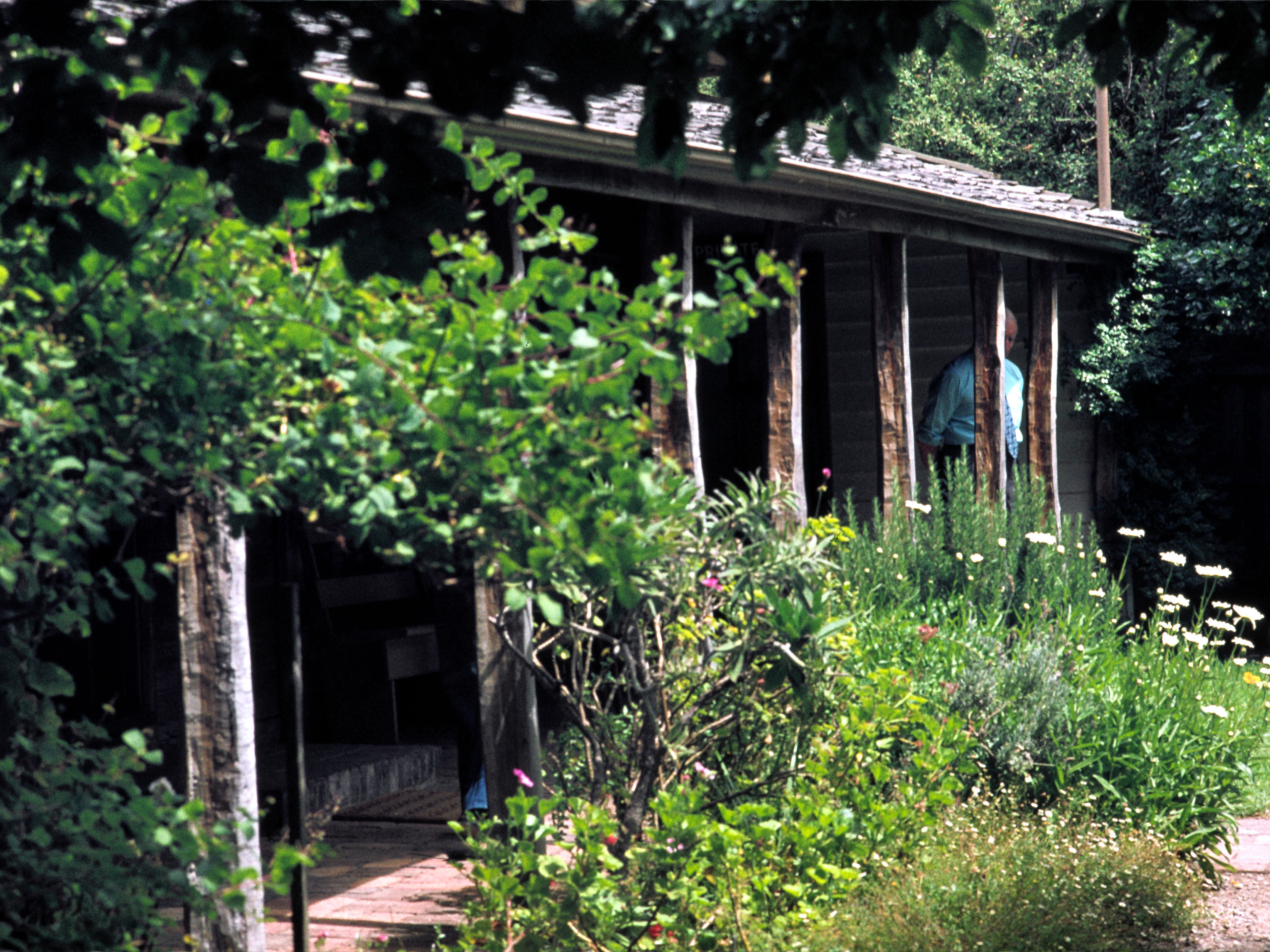
Detail of the verandah, in 1979, prior to restoration

Following the departure of the McCrae family in 1851, the interior structure of the house remained unchanged during the Burrell's seventy-four-year habitation, apart from the addition of two bay windows. They resided at the homestead from 1851 to 1925. John Twycross, a Burrell descendant, who had stayed at the house often as a child, was able to point out the previous functions of each room, seventy five years later, such as where his bed had stood in the present child's bedroom, where his aunt Kate had roasted scallops in the open fireplace of the kitchen, as well as the location in the dining room of the Broadwood piano that had been dropped into the sea during transportation to "The Seat" and had thereafter been difficult to tune.

Kate Burrell died in 1925 and the Williams family purchased the house in 1927. There was an auction under the name of "The Lighthouse Estate" and the remaining property was subdivided into blocks of land. The Williams carried out some renovations, (possibly covering the original walls) and converted the outside kitchen into a small flat. From 1938 to 1947 the homestead was used as a private nursing home until it was sold in 1952. From 1952 until 1955, the house was divided into two flats to be let as holiday accommodation, a new development on the peninsula following the World War II.

In 1961 the house was repurchased by George Gordon McCrae, named after his grandfather, and was Georgiana McCrae's great grandson. Following the death of George Gordon McCrae, Junior, his son, Andrew, in 1970 donated the homestead to the Victorian branch of the National Trust. By then, the exterior surroundings of the house were greatly changed by time and the original vast land run purchased by Andrew McCrae had shrunk to a mere few blocks. The interior of the house was dilapidated.

In the twentieth century, the Burrell family had covered the original wooden messmate shingles with a corrugated roof both for tank water and to protect against bushfires. When the homestead was restored, the shingles were revealed under the newer cladding roof, that had protected the integrity of the original messmate shingles from 1844.

=== Connection to Heronswood ===
All early buildings in the area incorporated local materials. Heronswood, a grand home which stands above Anthonys Nose, is open to the public. The main building was built in 1874, of a rare green granite that was obtained from the original McCrae property in 1874. The shingle roofs of the McCrae homestead and the first building at Heronswood were made of local messmate timber.

== Historic home museum ==
The McCrae Homestead Visitors Centre is a gallery that was built adjacent to the original homestead to house the McCrae and Burrell family collections of 19th-century heirlooms. The galleries provide more of the history of the homestead and Victorian society at that time.

=== McCrae Gallery ===
The McCrae Gallery is a restored space that uses original fine sketches and drawings by Georgiana McCrae, costumes and artefacts to illustrate Georgiana's extraordinary life. The exhibit shows the transitions that Georgiana McCrae made from her birth as the illegitimate daughter of a Scottish Lord from Clan Gordon, to her studies of portrait painting in London as a young woman, her marriage to Andrew McCrae, and their emigration to Melbourne, her life there as part of Melbourne society, and her love of her "mountain home" where she lived the life of a pioneer while maintaining her life as a painter.

Georgiana McCrae kept a diary that analysed Victorian society. Many of her letters are held in the Latrobe Library archives, part of the State Library of Victoria. Of interest is her paint box and brushes and a Scottish kilt of Gordon tartan, that was made in a child's size for one of her sons. Also there are some examples of her miniatures, including a self-portrait, and paintings of her children and of Eliza, a member of the Bunurong tribe. There is also a childhood drawing by George Gordon McCrae that illustrated a local corroboree.

=== Burrell Twycross Gallery ===
The Burrell Twycross Gallery tells the story of the Burrell family who lived at the Arthur's Seat cottage for seventy four years. The Gallery contains video presentations, original artefacts and furnishings.

A rare surviving example of a large format Ambrotype portrait of the Burrells is featured, that was taken in 1857, six years after they settled at Arthur's Seat. It shows the eight family members that were still living at the homestead after the early years of births, deaths and re-migration to England. Following the death of her first husband Samuel Henry Clutterbuck, Charlotte Burrell married John Twycross, a wool merchant from Wokingham, England, at the homestead in 1870.

The Dollond telescope in the homestead, by John William Twycross, 1923

The Visions of Port Phillip exhibition displays the photographic works of their son, early-20th century pictorialist photography, John William Twycross, a banker, who spent his holidays visiting his mother's family at Arthur's Seat Run, before development changed the area. Twycross' work as a photographer combined artistry and environmentalism. The large fine art prints are of great historic interest, and captured the Mornington Peninsula of its era, and show the strong ties formed between families that were early pioneers and their dependence on the Port Phillip Bay for transport, fishing, and pleasure. The exhibition was a recipient of the 2010 Victorian Community History Awards. The judges found that "A rich and extensive family photographic album forms the extraordinary raw material for a 14-chapter social documentary which also draws on family stories to profile the development of one of Melbourne’s historic and popular beachside holiday regions." Images were drawn from the pictorial black and white photographs of Twycross and colour slides taken in the 1950s on the Mornington peninsula. Information for the DVD was gathered from family papers, oral histories, the Dromana and District Historical Society Inc, and the La Trobe Library archives. Chapter 2, "Once Were Wetlands" drew on 19th-century books and maps owned by the Twycross family and a Victorian Historical Journal article, published in 1940.

John William Twycross was also part of a renowned group of first cousins, William Scoresby Routledge, an Easter Island anthropologist, John Milne, the inventor of the modern seismograph, and his sister Lilian Twycross, a Melbourne opera singer and the first student of F. Matthias Alexander.

Of further interest are original papers and quotes from Alfred William Howitt, a family friend, show Howitt's perspective on the Bay and the beauty of the land and sea at "The Seat". "The Bay is covered with a haze as I look out... the smell of new hay comes in at the windows...a few hundred yards below the house is a belt of huge honeysuckle wattles, tea tree and she oaks edging the beach... over the tops you see the bay as smooth as a pond and six miles off are the heads and a blue broken ridge of hills."

== See also ==
- Architecture of Melbourne
- List of museums in Melbourne
- List of places on the Victorian Heritage Register in the Shire of the Mornington Peninsula
