= Andrew Kellaway (Australian rules footballer) =

Australian rules footballer

Personal information
- Born: 23 November 1975 (age 50)
- Original team: Sandringham Zebras/Richmond Reserves
- Draft: 71st overall, 1997 AFL draft
- Debut: Round 7, 10 May 1998, Richmond vs. Melbourne, at MCG
- Height: 190 cm (6 ft 3 in)
- Weight: 90 kg (198 lb)

Playing career^{1}
Years	Club	Games (Goals)
1998–2006	Richmond	172 (30)
- ^{1} Playing statistics correct to the end of 2006.

Career highlights
- Richmond Best & Fairest 2000; All Australian 2000; International Rules Series 2000, 2002 Jim Stynes Medal 2002

Andrew Kellaway (born 23 November 1975) is a former Australian rules football player who played for the Richmond Football Club in the AFL.

== Life ==
Educated at Caulfield Grammar School, Kellaway joined his brother Duncan at Richmond in 1997, recruited with pick 71. He was a defender, and in his best AFL season, 2000, he won the club's best and fairest award and was a member of the All-Australian Team, at one stage playing 118 games in a row.

He played International rules football for Australia in 2000 and 2002, playing as the goalkeeper in both years. In the latter year he won the Jim Stynes Medal.

He was delisted by Richmond at the end of the 2006 season at age 30, a decision made by the club that surprised many.

In 2011, Kellaway, after a stint as a landscaper, became a firefighter.

== Statistics ==
Legend
G	Goals	K	Kicks	D	Disposals	T	Tackles
B	Behinds	H	Handballs	M	Marks

Season	Team	No.	Games	Totals							Averages (per game)							Votes
Season	Team	No.	Games	G	B	K	H	D	M	T	G	B	K	H	D	M	T	Votes
1998	Richmond	39	16	0	0	89	111	200	74	34	0.0	0.0	5.6	6.9	12.5	4.6	2.1	0
1999	Richmond	39	18	1	4	117	108	225	79	23	0.1	0.2	6.5	6.0	12.5	4.4	1.3	0
2000	Richmond	39	22	12	4	235	145	380	161	36	0.5	0.2	10.7	6.6	17.3	7.3	1.6	5
2001	Richmond	39	25	3	1	222	148	370	153	54	0.1	0.0	8.9	5.9	14.8	6.1	2.2	0
2002	Richmond	39	22	4	3	200	137	337	139	47	0.2	0.1	9.1	6.2	15.3	6.3	2.1	1
2003	Richmond	39	22	2	1	216	140	356	144	52	0.1	0.0	9.8	6.4	16.2	6.5	2.4	0
2004	Richmond	39	16	1	2	108	79	187	71	21	0.1	0.1	6.8	4.9	11.7	4.4	1.3	0
2005	Richmond	39	16	3	0	142	103	245	98	28	0.2	0.0	8.9	6.4	15.3	6.1	1.8	0
2006	Richmond	39	15	4	1	160	78	238	128	34	0.3	0.1	10.7	5.2	15.9	8.5	2.3	4
Career			172	30	16	1489	1049	2538	1047	329	0.2	0.1	8.7	6.1	14.8	6.1	1.9	10

== See also ==
- List of Caulfield Grammar School people
