= Mick McLaren (footballer) =

Australian rules footballer (1936 – 2014)

Personal information
- Full name: John William McLaren
- Born: 3 April 1936; Melbourne
- Died: 18 February 2014 (aged 77)
- Original team: Caulfield Grammar School
- Height: 182 cm (6 ft 0 in)
- Weight: 81 kg (179 lb)
- Position: half-back flank

Playing career^{1}
Years	Club	Games (Goals)
1955	St Kilda (VFL)	4 (0)
- ^{1} Playing statistics correct to the end of 1960.

John William "Mick" McLaren (3 April 1936 – 18 February 2014) was an Australian rules footballer for the St Kilda Football Club in the Victorian Football League (VFL), who later became the manager of a highly successful printing business.

== Early life and education ==
The son of John and Jean McLaren (née Rayner), John William McLaren was born in the City of Melbourne on 3 April 1936.

He attended Caulfield Grammar School from 1943 to 1953, where he distinguished himself as both a cricketer and as a footballer, playing in both the school's First XI, aged 14, where he played alongside Bill O'Halloran, and its First XVIII, aged 16.

== Football ==
He was recruited by St Kilda from Caulfield Grammar School in 1954. He played well in a number of St Kilda's senior pre-season practice matches, and went on to play the entire 1954 season in the St Kilda (under-19) Third XVIII.

Having trained well in the preseason, McLaren made his senior debut in the first match of the 1955 season, against Melbourne, at the Junction Oval, on 16 April 1955 on the half-back flank; St Kilda lost the match 8.11 (59) to 17.16 (118).

He played in the next match in Round Two (23 April) against Essendon; but was unable to play again, due to his Army National Service obligations, until the Round 17 (13 August 1955) match against Geelong, and in Round 18 (20 August 1955), the last match of the season, against Richmond.

He injured his ankle in the early part of the 1956 season and did not play again.

== See also ==
- List of Caulfield Grammar School people
