= Andrew Walsh =

Andrew Hugh Walsh AM is an Australian festival director. He has directed numerous ceremonies and public events.

He was educated at Caulfield Grammar School in Melbourne. Among his career highlights, Walsh was Executive Producer of the ceremonies of the Athens 2004 Olympic Games and Executive Producer the ceremonies of the 2006 Commonwealth Games. He also Directed the 2003 Rugby World Cup Opening Ceremony.

On 12 June 2006, in the Queen's Birthday honours list, Walsh was made a Member of the Order of Australia "for service to the events management industry through the creative direction and production of major outdoor performances and public celebrations in Australia and internationally, and to education."

== See also ==
- List of Caulfield Grammar School people
