= Marcus Glasscock =

Australian rules footballer (1900–1979)

Personal information
- Full name: Herbert Marcus Glasscock
- Born: 3 September 1900; Monomeith, Victoria
- Died: 11 October 1979 (aged 79)
- Original team: Lang Lang
- Height: 183 cm (6 ft 0 in)
- Position: Centre half-forward

Playing career^{1}
Years	Club	Games (Goals)
1923–24	Melbourne	6 (0)
- ^{1} Playing statistics correct to the end of 1924.

Herbert Marcus Glasscock (3 September 1900 – 11 October 1979) was an Australian rules footballer who played with Melbourne in the Victorian Football League (VFL).

== Family ==
The son of Herbert Thomas Glasscock (1872–1953), and Alice Betsy Glasscock (1873–1950), née Greaves, Herbert Marcus Glasscock was born at Monomeith, Victoria on 3 September 1900.

He married Kathleen Violet "Kate" Barling (1913–2014) in 1937.

== Education ==
He attended Caulfield Grammar School in East St Kilda for three years, from 1916 to 1918. He played cricket for the school's First XI, and football for the school's First XVIII.

In his last year at Caulfield Grammar (viz., 1918), Glasscock, an excellent student, was not only the school captain, but was also the captain of the school's First XI and its First XVIII teams.

== Football ==
He had been captain of Caulfield Grammar's First XVIII in 1918.

=== Lang Lang ===
Glasscock came to the attention of VFL recruiters while playing for Lang Lang. In their 1922 premiership victory, Lang Lang were trailing by five points with almost no time left: Glasscock kicked a goal from 50 yards out, winning the match for Lang Lang by a point.

=== Melbourne ===
Recruited from Lang Lang, he played his first senior match, at half-forward flank, for the Melbourne Football Club in the round 16 match against the Essendon Football Club, at Windy Hill, on 1 September 1923.

Glasscock, a tall half-forward from Lang Lang, had his first run with the Fuchsias on Saturday. The selectors are satisfied that in him, and (Eric) Donaldson, from the same district, they have found two stars that will twinkle brightly next season. Glasscock stands 6ft. high, and Donaldson, who plays half-back, is two inches taller. Both arc intelligent players, capable marks, and can drive a ball accurately with both feet.

In all he played six senior matches with Melbourne.

His last match was the round 8 match against the Fitzroy Football Club, at the Brunswick Street Oval, on 14 June 1924.

=== Lang Lang ===
Granted a clearance from Melbourne, he returned to Lang Lang in 1925.

== Death ==
He died in New South Wales on 11 October 1979 and his ashes are interred at Springvale Botanical Cemetery.
