= Dick Wicks =

Australian rules footballer

Personal information
- Full name: Dick Wicks
- Born: 18 August 1929
- Died: 20 April 2006 (aged 76)
- Original team: Caulfield Grammarians
- Height: 180 cm (5 ft 11 in)
- Weight: 70 kg (154 lb)
- Position: Wing

Playing career^{1}
Years	Club	Games (Goals)
1949–51	St Kilda	16 (5)
- ^{1} Playing statistics correct to the end of 1951.

Dick Wicks (18 August 1929 – 20 April 2006) was an Australian rules footballer who played with St Kilda in the Victorian Football League (VFL).

Wicks was runner up in the 1955 - 130 yards Wangaratta Gift at the Wangaratta Showgrounds.

== See also ==
- List of Caulfield Grammar School people
