= Duncan Kellaway =

Australian rules footballer (born 1973)

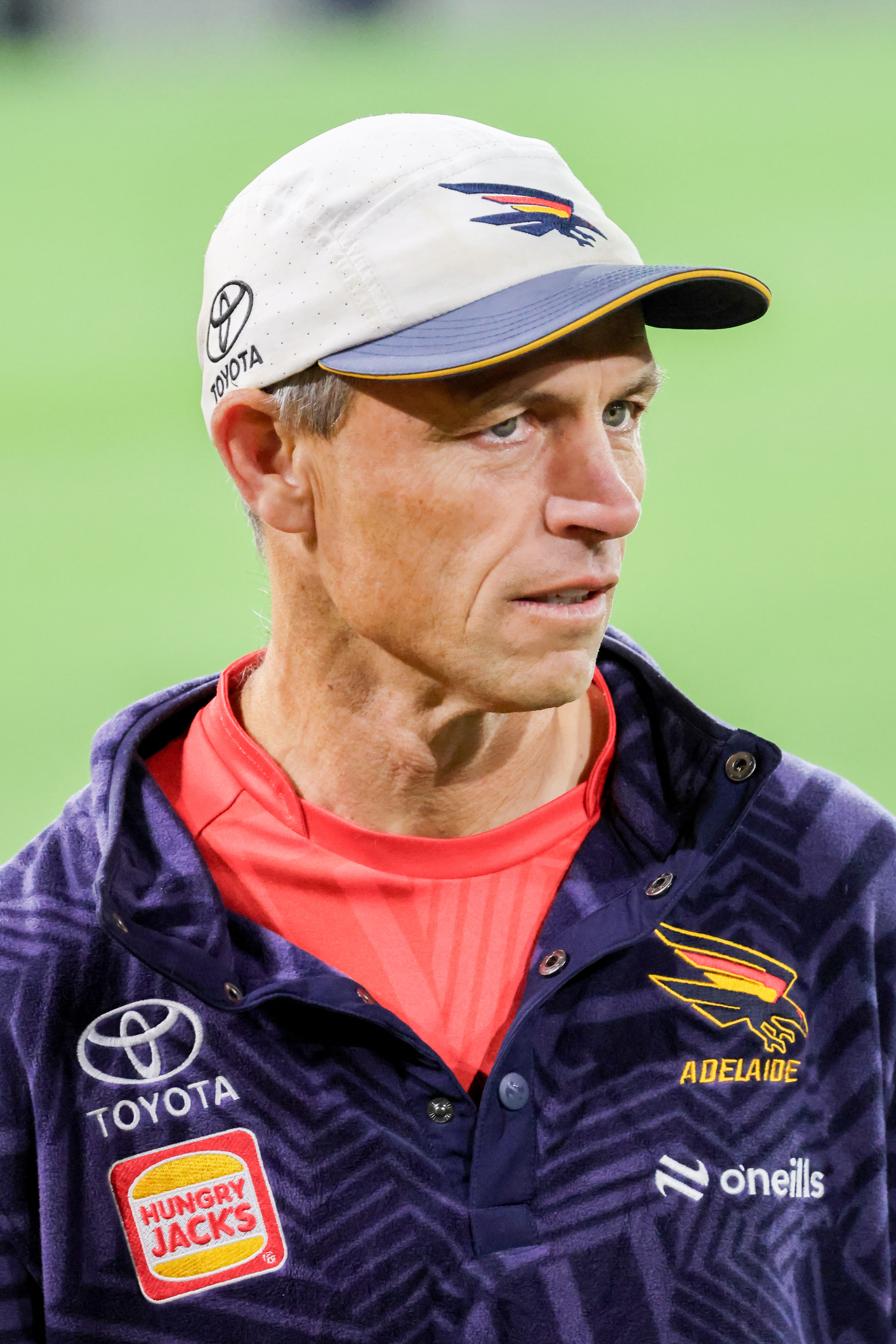
- Kellaway with Adelaide in 2026

Personal information
- Born: 17 February 1973 (age 53)
- Original team: Caulfield Grammar
- Debut: Round 7, 8 May 1993, Richmond vs. St Kilda, at MCG
- Height: 185 cm (6 ft 1 in)
- Weight: 83 kg (183 lb)

Playing career^{1}
Years	Club	Games (Goals)
1993–2004	Richmond	180 (12)
- ^{1} Playing statistics correct to the end of 2004.

Career highlights
- AFL Rising Star nominee 1993, 1994; Interstate Games:- 2

Duncan Kellaway (born 17 February 1973) is a former Australian rules football player who played for the Richmond Football Club in the Australian Football League (AFL).

Educated at Caulfield Grammar School, Kellaway debuted for Richmond in 1993, tallying 27 possessions in his first AFL match. He played State of Origin football on several occasions for Victoria, and retired in 2004 having played 180 senior games. He played just eight games in his final two seasons due to injuries. His brother Andrew was drafted to Richmond in 1997, and they lined up in the same back line.

He joined the Adelaide Football Club as the Physio and Rehab Coach in 2012. Kellaway was employed as a physiotherapist at the Geelong Football Club from 2005 to 2011.
