= Caulfield Grammar School =

School in Victoria, Australia

Location
- Melbourne, Victoria (main campuses); Australia; 37°52′34″S 145°0′11″E

Information
- Type: Private school, co-educational, day and boarding, Christian school
- Motto: Latin: Labora Ut Requiescas (Work hard that you may rest content)
- Denomination: Anglican
- Established: 25 April 1881; 145 years ago
- Founder: Joseph Henry Davies
- Principal: Ashleigh Martin
- Employees: 800+
- Gender: Co-educational
- Enrolment: 3,470 (K–12)
- Colours: Blue & White
- Slogan: Mind for life.
- Song: The School Song
- Publication: Labora
- Yearbook: The Grammarian
- Annual tuition: $20,000 – $36,000 + $30,000 for boarding students
- Affiliation: Associated Public Schools of Victoria
- Alumni: Caulfield Grammarians
- Website: www.caulfieldgs.vic.edu.au

Caulfield Grammar School is a private, co-educational, Anglican, International Baccalaureate, day and boarding school, located in Melbourne, Victoria, Australia. Founded in 1881 as a boys' school, Caulfield Grammar began admitting girls exactly one hundred years later. The school amalgamated with Malvern Memorial Grammar School (MMGS) in 1961, with the MMGS campus becoming Malvern Campus.

Caulfield Grammar has three-day campuses in Victoria, Caulfield (Years 7–12), Wheelers Hill (K–Year 12), and Malvern House (K–Year 6). It has an outdoor education campus at Yarra Junction, and a student centre in Nanjing, China where the Year 9 internationalism programme is conducted. Caulfield Grammar is the second largest school in Victoria, currently catering for 3,315 students.

== History ==
=== Foundation and early years ===
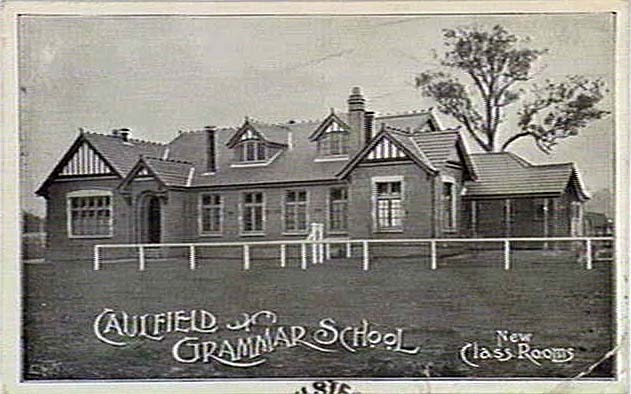
The original buildings on Caulfield Campus's current site, circa 1910

Joseph Henry Davies, who had served as a missionary in southern India, purchased the site for the school — it was adjacent to the Elsternwick railway station, and had been a small lolly shop — for £25 on 16 April and employed his sister and two brothers as teachers. Davies' aim was "that the School should be a thoroughly Christian one" that looked to render "Christian service".

Although the school was originally located in Elsternwick, it is thought to have been named Caulfield Grammar School because Caulfield was the regional locality — and the geographical boundaries of Melbourne's suburban areas were not strictly defined or precisely named at the time — also, it is significant that the vicar of St Mary's Anglican Church in Caulfield had provided Davies with support when opening the school.

Caulfield Grammar School was founded on 25 April 1881, by Davies, with just nine pupils. Davies' original intention was to commence classes on Wednesday, 20 April 1881; however, due to circumstances that were never clearly explained, Davies postponed the school's opening, at the last minute, until Monday, 25 April 1881.

A year after opening, the school had 32 students enrolled. To house the growing student body, the school then moved to a nearby small building, later destroyed in a fire in 1890. In 1896, the school subsumed Hawksburn Grammar School, a smaller local Christian school, situated in Wynnstay Road, Prahran, after Hawksburn's headmaster, Walter Murray Buntine, was appointed as headmaster at Caulfield Grammar. Hawksburn's 55 students subsequently transferred to Caulfield Grammar. The current site, a property near Sir Frederick Sargood's Rippon Lea Estate on what is now Glen Eira Road, St Kilda East was purchased in 1909. Classes began on the site on 9 February 1909 and the school's boarding house opened in 1912.

By 1931, the school's 50th anniversary, attendance had grown to 500 students but Caulfield Grammar was still considered small compared to schools such as Scotch College, Melbourne, Wesley College Melbourne and Melbourne Grammar School. To celebrate the Golden Jubilee, a Jubilee Fair was held at the school in May. In the same year, the school moved from private ownership to a registered company governed by a School Council, an organisational structure still used today, with formal affiliation with the Church of England.

=== Post WWII history ===
The school was renamed Malvern Memorial Grammar School in 1948 to honour old boys who had fought in World Wars I and II. Malvern Memorial Grammar School amalgamated with Shaw House in 1971 and became the Malvern Campus, a primary school located in the Valentine's Mansion, and its students began to wear the Caulfield Grammar School uniform. From 1949 to 1979, Caulfield Grammar had operated Shaw House, its primary school located in Mayfield Street, St Kilda East, offering kindergarten and schooling from Years 1 to 3.

In 1958, Caulfield Grammar joined the Associated Public Schools of Victoria school sporting competition. Caulfield Grammar was Victoria's fifth largest school in 1959, with over 800 students. In 1961, Caulfield Grammar School affiliated with Malvern Memorial Grammar School. Malvern Grammar School opened in 1890 as a boys-only secondary school and in 1924 moved into the Valentine's Mansion, formerly the home of Sir John Mark Davies (no relation to the school's founder), a Victorian Cabinet minister. The mansion was built in 1892 and contains a large ballroom. Valentine's Mansion has been listed as a place of historical and architecture significance by both the Victorian Heritage Register and the Register of the National Estate.

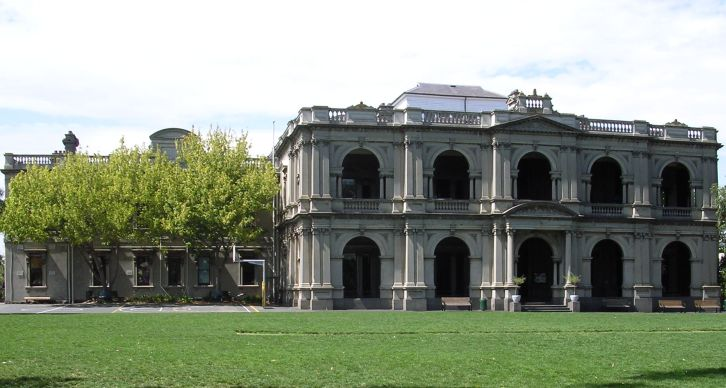
Valentine's Mansion at Malvern Campus

During the 1960s and 1970s, student activism saw changes in the school's policies relating to students. Appointed prefects were replaced in 1970 by an elected School Committee to represent the student body, the publication of a student newsletter Demos—containing editorials on aspects of the school—was allowed, religious education classes were made voluntary for senior year levels, the position of school chaplain was abolished, and Caulfield Grammar was the only APS school to allow its students to participate in moratorium marches protesting the Vietnam War on 8 May 1970.

The school's centenary year, 1981, marked the appearance of the first girls at Caulfield Grammar, as a second senior school campus opened at Wheelers Hill on 26 April. Caulfield Grammar had purchased the land for a future project in 1969, and a new campus was established to celebrate the centenary. Wheelers Hill began as a coeducational school for all year levels. In 1993, the other campuses opened to girls, making Caulfield Grammar fully co-educational.

The school established a computer network in 1997 with all students and staff having individual log in details, email accounts, and file space. This capability is referred to as the School's sixth or "virtual" campus, and enables access to email and files from the school network over the Internet.

The school's historic War Memorial Hall, opened by Sir Dallas Brooks, the Governor of Victoria, on 27 April 1958, had cost some £50,000 (approx. $12 million in 2016) to construct on the Caulfield Grammar Campus. In the early morning of 7 November 2000, the "Cup Day" public holiday, a fierce fire broke out in the then-being-refurbished building (just two weeks away from completion); the roof collapsed, and the entire building was destroyed — only Alan Sumner's stained glass memorial windows escaped damage.

The school then began to plan the construction of major halls at both the Caulfield Grammar and the Wheelers Hill campuses, naming the project "The Twin Halls". The Memorial Hall at Wheelers Hill was officially opened on 28 July 2005, and the "Cripps Centre", its counterpart on the Caulfield Grammar Campus opened on 25 October 2005. Each hall seats 650 people: the Wheelers Hill hall including a new chapel fitted with a multimedia centre, and the Caulfield Grammar hall including a music/visual art department. Caulfield Grammar School now has over 3,000 students throughout its three-day campuses.

The school is a member of the Associated Public Schools of Victoria (APS), and is affiliated with the Headmasters' and Headmistresses' Conference, the Association of Heads of Independent Schools of Australia (AHISA), the Junior School Heads Association of Australia (JSHAA), the Australian Boarding Schools' Association, and the Association of Independent Schools of Victoria (AISV).

=== Yarra Junction Campus ===
In 1947, a country centre opened at Yarra Junction on land donated by the Cuming family. Cuming House was the first outdoor education campus for an Australian school, set in the Australian bush and close to the Yarra River. The Yarra Junction Campus today allows students to live in sustainable eco-cabins with rainwater tanks and solar power technology. The Earth Studies Centre, Wadambawilam (Aboriginal term for 'learning place'), operates on wind and solar power, and uses many environmentally sound practices to teach students about long-term environmental sustainability. Also on campus is a commercial dairy which produces over 1 million litres of milk annually. On United Nations World Environment Day 2001 the Yarra Junction Campus won an award for Best School Based Environment Project for its energy-saving eco-cabins project.

=== Nanjing Campus ===
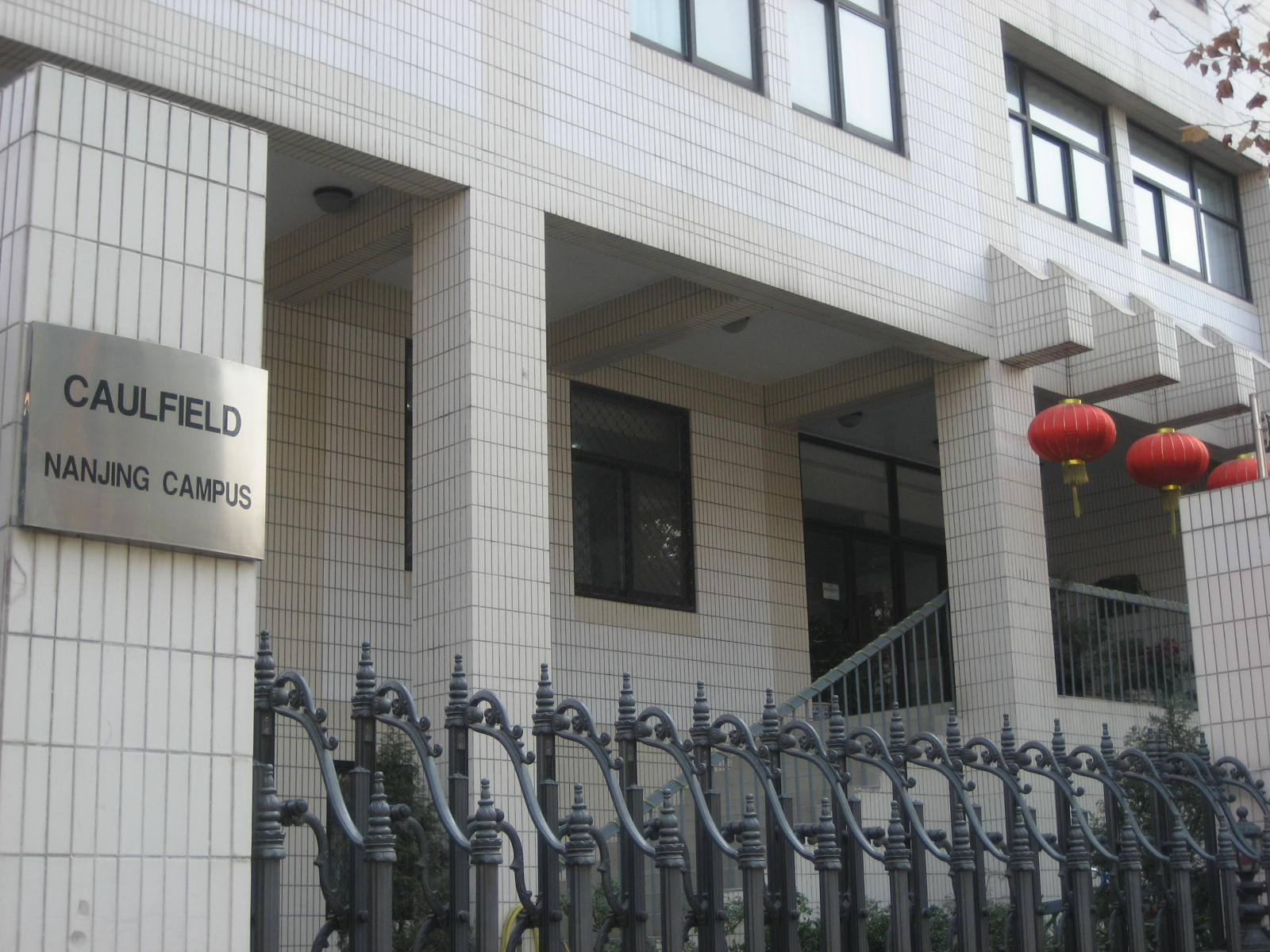
Main entrance of the Nanjing Campus

The school opened a fifth campus in Nanjing, China in 1998, with a residential campus constructed on property owned by the High School Affiliated to Nanjing Normal University. This became the first overseas campus for an Australian high school, and the first campus established by a foreign secondary school in China. It is staffed by six full-time Australian teachers, as well as six trainees selected from the school's annual graduating Year 12 class who complete 12-month gap year placements. Most Caulfield Grammar Year 9 students take part in five-week internationalism programs and are based in Nanjing, The Nanjing campus is temporarily closed.

Caulfield Grammar focuses on Mandarin Chinese as its major Language Other Than English, with the language first offered as a senior school subject in 1963, and later becoming the sole Asian language taught as it had higher student enrolments than Indonesian. It has been taught at every year level across all three campuses since 1994, and the establishment of a campus in Nanjing allowed the school to strengthen its ties with the region. Nanjing was selected as the campus' location in part because Jiangsu province, of which Nanjing is the capital and largest city, is Victoria's sister-state, and Nanjing University had previously established an Australian studies department.

Stephen Newton, Caulfield Grammar's principal from 1993 to 2011, was made an Officer of the Order of Australia in 2012, for "distinguished service to education in the independent schools sector, through executive roles with professional organisations and advisory bodies, and to the development of educational development opportunities with China," recognising his role in founding the Nanjing Campus.

== Academics ==
Caulfield Grammar School offers students a wide range of subjects in its academic curriculum. All students study a language in the middle school where they can choose to study Mandarin Chinese, French, or German. Students may continue these languages as electives thereafter. The school awards scholarships for a range of fields, including academic excellence, theatre, music, art and sports.

=== Outdoor education ===
The Yarra Junction campus hosts student camps at various year levels: Year 3 students attend for one day, Year 5 students for three days, Year 7 students have one week camps, and Year 8 students have 11-day programmes including a three-day outdoor camping activity. At each of the camps involving overnight stays by students, student leaders currently in Years 10 and 11 accompany groups for the duration of their programmes. Year 10 and 11 students wishing to act as leaders attend a leadership camp at the campus at the end of the previous school year, and a number are then selected to take part in student camps. As part of various camps, students stay in eco-cabins and must monitor their use of both water and electricity. Lessons also take place at Wadambawilam and at the campus dairy.

== Student life ==
=== Sport ===
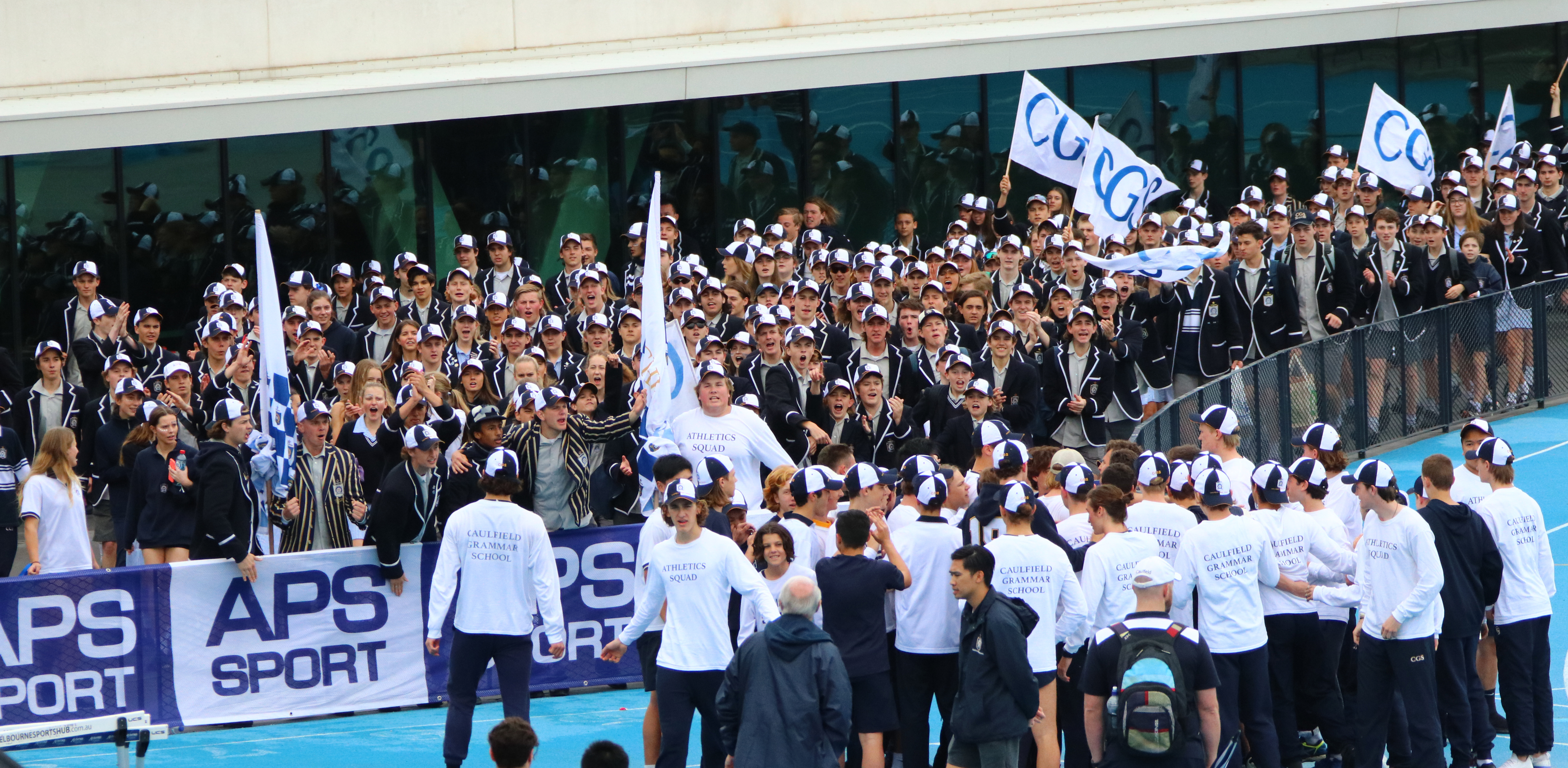
2018 APS Boys Athletics team being accompanied by a Caulfield Grammar School cheer squad at Lakeside Stadium

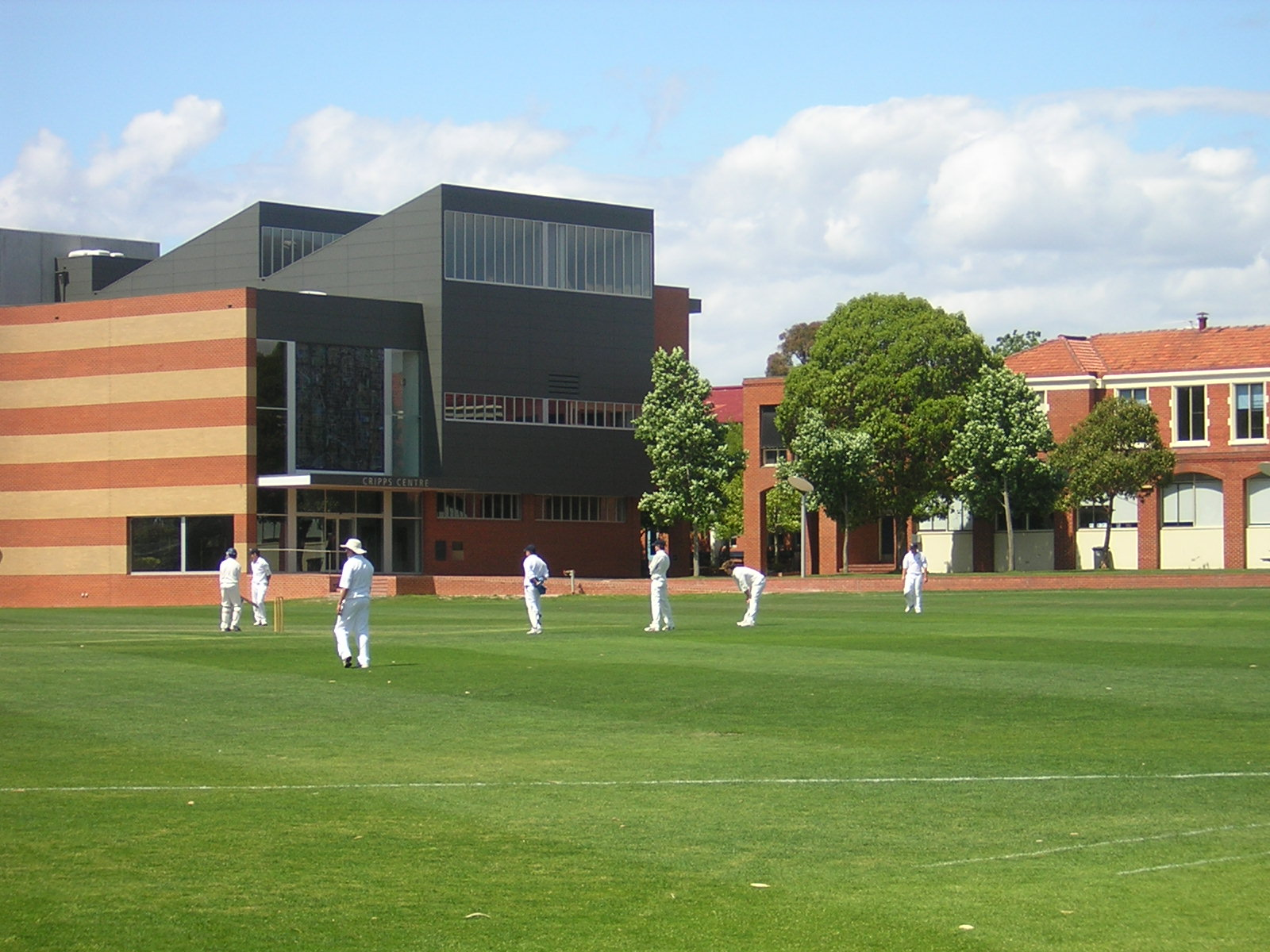
The Cripps Centre (left) and main buildings (right) at Caulfield Campus, with Alf Mills Oval in the foreground

Students from Years 5 to 12 participate in school sport as part of the APS competition. Caulfield Grammar was one of the founding members of the Schools' Association of Victoria in 1882, but when the legitimacy of the association's amateur status was questioned, Caulfield Grammar and Brighton Grammar School formed the Schools' Amateur Athletic Association of Victoria in 1911 (renamed the Associated Grammar Schools of Victoria in 1921), and were joined by other Melbourne private and church schools in the competition. In 1958, Caulfield Grammar accepted an offer to join the Associated Public Schools of Victoria.

After initially poor results the school introduced compulsory involvement in sporting teams in 1958 in an attempt to improve its performance. Caulfield Grammar currently holds an APS record for winning 12 consecutive APS Boys' Athletics Championships from 1994 to 2005, and has won numerous 1st Division premierships throughout its history. The First XVIII football team won 18 consecutive premierships from 1913 to 1930 – the longest championship run for a Caulfield Grammar Firsts team.

The main facilities for sport are shared over both Caulfield and Wheelers Hill campus. At Caulfield Grammar, the Lindsay Thompson Centre is used for indoor sports such as basketball and netball, and the Alfred Mills Oval is the traditional home of the First XI cricket and First XVIII football teams. The oval has been a venue of matches in the 2004 Commonwealth Bank Under 19 Cricket Championships.

==== Basketball Team Achievements ====
===== Championship Men (Open) =====
- Australian Schools Championships

(gold) Champions: 2012

=== The arts ===
Caulfield Grammar's most senior orchestral group is the Galamian Orchestra, which is primarily a string group, but expands to add other instruments when required. In 2005, Australian jazz musician James Morrison performed with the "No Strings Attached" stage band at Monash University. In 2006, the "No Strings Attached" stage band and the senior concert band toured European nations, and was part of the Montreux Jazz Festival on 5 July 2006.

Caulfield Grammar also competes in the Debaters Association of Victoria Schools competition, and Caulfield Campus is the host venue for the Caulfield Grammar regional competition. Five debates are held each year, and Caulfield Grammar teams debate against other Melbourne schools on various current interest topics. Students are also involved in mooting, where teams argue legal matters based on evidence and precedent, and compete in the Bond University Mooting competition.

== Alumni ==
All past students of the school are members of the Caulfield Grammarians' Association (CGA), which coordinates reunions, alumni sporting teams and other activities for alumni, known as Caulfield Grammarians. The CGA was formed in 1885, and is believed to have been in continuous operation since 1906, the year of the 25th anniversary of Caulfield Grammar's founding. The Caulfield Grammarians Football Club competes in the Victorian Amateur Football Association, and has been represented by notable former Australian rules football players, including Dean Anderson and Duncan Kellaway (both past students of Caulfield Grammar), as well as Glenn Archer and Anthony Stevens.

A number of Caulfield Grammar alumni have made significant contributions in the fields of government, sports, music, business and academia among others. Among those who have had involvement in politics, Peter Dowding (Western Australia) and Lindsay Thompson (Victoria), have served as state premiers. Free-style swimmer Mack Horton has won multiple medals at the Olympic Games, World Championships and Commonwealth Games, including a gold medal in the 400m freestyle event at the 2016 Summer Olympics in Rio de Janeiro, Brazil. Chris Judd and John Schultz have both been awarded the Brownlow Medal for the fairest and best player in the Victorian/Australian Football League, and John Landy has held both the men's mile world record in athletics and the office of Governor of Victoria. John Clifford Valentine Behan, later second Warden of Trinity College at the University of Melbourne, became the first Victorian Rhodes Scholar after graduating as the Dux of Caulfield Grammar School in 1895. Fred Walker founded the company that first created and sold Vegemite, an Australian spread and cultural icon.

The rock group The Birthday Party was formed by Nick Cave, Mick Harvey and Phill Calvert while they were students at the school in 1973, and Cave and Harvey would later form the band Nick Cave and the Bad Seeds, which released Top 10 albums in Australia and the United Kingdom. Cave and Harvey had been members of the school choir under the direction of Norman Kaye, who became a noted actor and musician after working at Caulfield Grammar as a music teacher and choirmaster.

== Headmasters and principals ==
Caulfield Grammar School has had 10 headmasters and principals over its 141 years of operation. The current principal is Ashleigh Martin, who was appointed in 2018 after the retirement of Rev. Andrew Syme.

Years	Name
1881–1888	J.H Davies
1888–1896	E.J. Barnett
1896–1931	W.M. Buntine
1923–1954	F.H.J. Archer
1955–1964	S.W. Kurrle
1965–1977	B.C. Lumsden
1977–1992	A.S. Holmes
1993–2011	S.H. Newton
2011–2018	A.P. Syme
2018–present	A.R. Martin

== See also ==
- List of schools in Victoria, Australia
- Caulfield Grammarians Football Club
