= 1914 VFL season =

18th season of the Victorian Football League (VFL)

1914 VFL premiership season
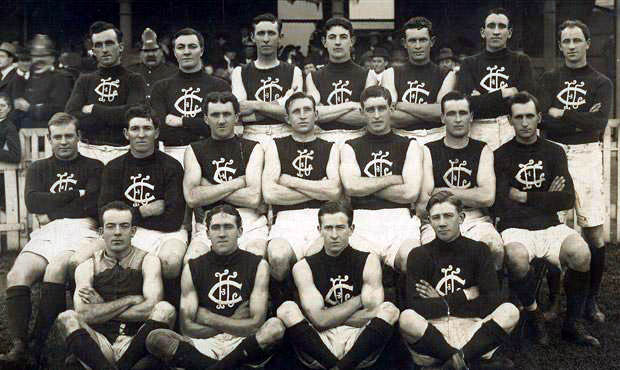
- Carlton 1914 VFL premiership team
- Date: 25 April – 26 September 1914
- Teams: 10
- Premiers: Carlton; 4th premiership
- Minor premiers: Carlton; 5th minor premiership
- Leading goalkicker medallist: Dick Lee (Collingwood); 57 goals
- Matches played: 94

The 1914 VFL season was the 18th season of the Victorian Football League (VFL), the highest-level senior Australian rules football competition in Victoria. The season featured ten clubs and ran from 25 April to 26 September, comprising an 18-match home-and-away season followed by a four-week finals series featuring the top four clubs.

It was the last season to feature University, who dropped out of the VFL after seven seasons: the club's strict policy of amateurism, at a time when player payments were becoming common, and its players focusing primarily on their studies, meant that they could not remain viable or competitive in the league.

Carlton won the premiership, defeating South Melbourne by six points in the 1914 VFL grand final; it was Carlton's fourth VFL premiership. Carlton also won the minor premiership by finishing atop the home-and-away ladder with a 13–3–2 win–loss–draw record. Collingwood's Dick Lee won his fourth leading goalkicker medal as the league's leading goalkicker.

== Background ==
In 1914, the VFL competition consisted of ten teams of 18 on-the-field players each, with no "reserves", although any of the 18 players who had left the playing field for any reason could later resume their place on the field at any time during the match. Each team played each other twice in a home-and-away season of 18 rounds; once the 18 round home-and-away season had finished, the 1914 VFL premiers were determined through the amended Argus system.

=== Withdrawal of University ===
On 16 October 1914, three weeks after the end of the 1914 season, University dropped out of the VFL and folded. The reasons given for this decision were:

1. After three promising seasons from 1908 to 1910, University had become very uncompetitive, finishing last in 1911–1914, and losing its last 51 consecutive matches.
2. The club had found it difficult to maintain a constant lineup since the players' primary focus was on their studies rather than football, particularly during mid-year examinations.
3. Since University's admission to the VFL in 1908, player payments in the VFL had become commonplace, and were officially permitted from 1911, whereas University chose to remain a fully amateur club drawing solely from university students, which had caused a number of players to defect to other clubs.

As such, both the club and the VFL had conceded it would be virtually impossible for University to become viable and/or competitive in an increasingly professional competition. Despite the outbreak of World War I eleven weeks earlier, the war was not given as a contributing factor in University's decision, especially as the conflict was not, at the time, expected to escalate to the extent it did.

Following University's dissolution, players who wished to continue playing in the VFL were all cleared to Melbourne through an informal arrangement beneficial to both clubs: University wished to see its best players playing together in the same VFL club to retain the strength of its own team for intervarsity competition, and Melbourne, which had mostly struggled since its 1900 premiership due to the lack of a natural recruiting district (formal zoning was not introduced until the following year), gained exclusive access to a valuable source of recruits. Among those who transferred from University to Melbourne were Jack Brake, Claude Bryan, Jack Doubleday, Dick Gibbs, Roy Park, and Percy Rodriguez.

University reformed in 1919, and after two seasons in the VFL seconds (reserves) competition where they fielded "A" and "B" teams, both teams returned to the Metropolitan Amateur Football Association (MAFA) in 1921, and they have continued in that competition (now known as the VAFA) to this day.

== Home-and-away season ==
=== Round 1 ===
Home team	Home team score	Away team	Away team score	Venue	Date
Fitzroy	13.15 (93)	Melbourne	5.7 (37)	Brunswick Street Oval	25 April 1914
University	6.8 (44)	South Melbourne	14.14 (98)	MCG	25 April 1914
St Kilda	8.16 (64)	Richmond	5.12 (42)	Junction Oval	25 April 1914
Geelong	8.13 (61)	Essendon	8.13 (61)	Corio Oval	25 April 1914
Collingwood	8.8 (56)	Carlton	6.20 (56)	Victoria Park	25 April 1914

=== Round 2 ===
Home team	Home team score	Away team	Away team score	Venue	Date
Essendon	12.14 (86)	University	7.8 (50)	EMCG	2 May 1914
Carlton	4.11 (35)	St Kilda	6.12 (48)	Princes Park	2 May 1914
South Melbourne	8.14 (62)	Geelong	7.9 (51)	Lake Oval	2 May 1914
Richmond	3.10 (28)	Fitzroy	9.15 (69)	Punt Road Oval	2 May 1914
Melbourne	6.7 (43)	Collingwood	9.13 (67)	MCG	2 May 1914

=== Round 3 ===
Home team	Home team score	Away team	Away team score	Venue	Date
Geelong	10.14 (74)	Melbourne	9.4 (58)	Corio Oval	9 May 1914
Fitzroy	9.12 (66)	South Melbourne	11.8 (74)	Brunswick Street Oval	9 May 1914
Collingwood	12.18 (90)	Richmond	4.12 (36)	Victoria Park	9 May 1914
St Kilda	7.10 (52)	Essendon	9.15 (69)	Junction Oval	9 May 1914
University	4.8 (32)	Carlton	13.24 (102)	MCG	9 May 1914

=== Round 4 ===
Home team	Home team score	Away team	Away team score	Venue	Date
Essendon	7.11 (53)	Richmond	7.7 (49)	EMCG	16 May 1914
St Kilda	17.13 (115)	Melbourne	8.7 (55)	Junction Oval	16 May 1914
University	11.5 (71)	Geelong	13.9 (87)	MCG	16 May 1914
Fitzroy	7.12 (54)	Collingwood	7.10 (52)	Brunswick Street Oval	16 May 1914
South Melbourne	8.4 (52)	Carlton	7.10 (52)	Lake Oval	16 May 1914

=== Round 5 ===
Home team	Home team score	Away team	Away team score	Venue	Date
Collingwood	18.17 (125)	University	7.11 (53)	Victoria Park	23 May 1914
Carlton	4.4 (28)	Fitzroy	6.10 (46)	Princes Park	23 May 1914
South Melbourne	11.11 (77)	St Kilda	9.12 (66)	Lake Oval	23 May 1914
Richmond	10.17 (77)	Geelong	6.17 (53)	Punt Road Oval	23 May 1914
Melbourne	5.7 (37)	Essendon	5.24 (54)	MCG	23 May 1914

=== Round 6 ===
Home team	Home team score	Away team	Away team score	Venue	Date
Essendon	5.11 (41)	South Melbourne	5.13 (43)	EMCG	30 May 1914
Carlton	13.19 (97)	Melbourne	5.9 (39)	Princes Park	30 May 1914
University	5.6 (36)	Richmond	16.14 (110)	MCG	30 May 1914
Geelong	4.8 (32)	Fitzroy	6.4 (40)	Corio Oval	30 May 1914
St Kilda	12.10 (82)	Collingwood	5.14 (44)	Junction Oval	30 May 1914

=== Round 7 ===
Home team	Home team score	Away team	Away team score	Venue	Date
Richmond	4.12 (36)	South Melbourne	7.12 (54)	Punt Road Oval	6 June 1914
Melbourne	14.9 (93)	University	5.16 (46)	MCG	6 June 1914
Fitzroy	10.13 (73)	St Kilda	7.6 (48)	Brunswick Street Oval	6 June 1914
Collingwood	11.12 (78)	Essendon	9.9 (63)	Victoria Park	6 June 1914
Geelong	9.11 (65)	Carlton	3.16 (34)	Corio Oval	6 June 1914

=== Round 8 ===
Home team	Home team score	Away team	Away team score	Venue	Date
Richmond	14.11 (95)	Melbourne	6.17 (53)	Punt Road Oval	8 June 1914
St Kilda	12.10 (82)	Geelong	8.10 (58)	Junction Oval	8 June 1914
University	3.6 (24)	Fitzroy	15.18 (108)	MCG	8 June 1914
South Melbourne	5.13 (43)	Collingwood	6.10 (46)	Lake Oval	8 June 1914
Essendon	6.3 (39)	Carlton	11.10 (76)	EMCG	8 June 1914

=== Round 9 ===
Home team	Home team score	Away team	Away team score	Venue	Date
St Kilda	15.11 (101)	University	10.7 (67)	Junction Oval	13 June 1914
Melbourne	8.7 (55)	South Melbourne	13.12 (90)	MCG	13 June 1914
Carlton	5.13 (43)	Richmond	5.11 (41)	Princes Park	13 June 1914
Fitzroy	10.6 (66)	Essendon	7.8 (50)	Brunswick Street Oval	13 June 1914
Geelong	9.17 (71)	Collingwood	5.6 (36)	Corio Oval	13 June 1914

=== Round 10 ===
Home team	Home team score	Away team	Away team score	Venue	Date
South Melbourne	9.16 (70)	University	8.7 (55)	Lake Oval	20 June 1914
Richmond	9.14 (68)	St Kilda	9.12 (66)	Punt Road Oval	20 June 1914
Essendon	9.13 (67)	Geelong	5.11 (41)	EMCG	20 June 1914
Carlton	6.16 (52)	Collingwood	5.15 (45)	Princes Park	20 June 1914
Melbourne	8.15 (63)	Fitzroy	12.11 (83)	MCG	20 June 1914

=== Round 11 ===
Home team	Home team score	Away team	Away team score	Venue	Date
Geelong	9.20 (74)	South Melbourne	6.9 (45)	Corio Oval	27 June 1914
Fitzroy	10.11 (71)	Richmond	4.15 (39)	Brunswick Street Oval	27 June 1914
Collingwood	11.16 (82)	Melbourne	7.10 (52)	Victoria Park	27 June 1914
University	3.8 (26)	Essendon	14.21 (105)	MCG	27 June 1914
St Kilda	7.8 (50)	Carlton	7.11 (53)	Junction Oval	27 June 1914

=== Round 12 ===
Home team	Home team score	Away team	Away team score	Venue	Date
Essendon	6.18 (54)	St Kilda	8.6 (54)	EMCG	4 July 1914
Carlton	11.21 (87)	University	8.8 (56)	Princes Park	4 July 1914
Melbourne	3.4 (22)	Geelong	9.14 (68)	MCG	4 July 1914
South Melbourne	10.4 (64)	Fitzroy	7.12 (54)	Lake Oval	4 July 1914
Richmond	9.11 (65)	Collingwood	6.13 (49)	Punt Road Oval	4 July 1914

=== Round 13 ===
Home team	Home team score	Away team	Away team score	Venue	Date
Melbourne	7.6 (48)	St Kilda	14.16 (100)	MCG	11 July 1914
Geelong	8.17 (65)	University	3.3 (21)	Corio Oval	11 July 1914
Collingwood	5.7 (37)	Fitzroy	3.16 (34)	Victoria Park	11 July 1914
Carlton	11.14 (80)	South Melbourne	9.6 (60)	Princes Park	11 July 1914
Richmond	8.21 (69)	Essendon	5.7 (37)	Punt Road Oval	11 July 1914

=== Round 14 ===
Home team	Home team score	Away team	Away team score	Venue	Date
St Kilda	12.7 (79)	South Melbourne	7.15 (57)	Junction Oval	18 July 1914
Geelong	13.12 (90)	Richmond	3.12 (30)	Corio Oval	18 July 1914
Essendon	14.15 (99)	Melbourne	6.5 (41)	EMCG	18 July 1914
University	3.5 (23)	Collingwood	15.13 (103)	MCG	18 July 1914
Fitzroy	4.13 (37)	Carlton	7.4 (46)	Brunswick Street Oval	18 July 1914

=== Round 15 ===
Home team	Home team score	Away team	Away team score	Venue	Date
Richmond	14.10 (94)	University	10.11 (71)	Punt Road Oval	25 July 1914
Fitzroy	8.5 (53)	Geelong	11.13 (79)	Brunswick Street Oval	25 July 1914
Collingwood	12.14 (86)	St Kilda	7.5 (47)	Victoria Park	25 July 1914
South Melbourne	4.8 (32)	Essendon	15.14 (104)	Lake Oval	25 July 1914
Melbourne	8.10 (58)	Carlton	16.15 (111)	MCG	25 July 1914

=== Round 16 ===
Home team	Home team score	Away team	Away team score	Venue	Date
Carlton	4.12 (36)	Geelong	5.4 (34)	Princes Park	1 August 1914
South Melbourne	8.9 (57)	Richmond	5.13 (43)	Lake Oval	1 August 1914
University	6.12 (48)	Melbourne	11.9 (75)	MCG	1 August 1914
St Kilda	6.15 (51)	Fitzroy	7.11 (53)	Junction Oval	1 August 1914
Essendon	5.9 (39)	Collingwood	6.12 (48)	EMCG	1 August 1914

=== Round 17 ===
Home team	Home team score	Away team	Away team score	Venue	Date
Melbourne	8.10 (58)	Richmond	15.15 (105)	MCG	22 August 1914
Geelong	9.7 (61)	St Kilda	5.15 (45)	Corio Oval	22 August 1914
Fitzroy	18.19 (127)	University	6.2 (38)	Brunswick Street Oval	22 August 1914
Collingwood	4.12 (36)	South Melbourne	8.9 (57)	Victoria Park	22 August 1914
Carlton	10.11 (71)	Essendon	7.8 (50)	Princes Park	22 August 1914

=== Round 18 ===
Home team	Home team score	Away team	Away team score	Venue	Date
Essendon	9.14 (68)	Fitzroy	7.8 (50)	EMCG	29 August 1914
Collingwood	4.10 (34)	Geelong	8.10 (58)	Victoria Park	29 August 1914
University	7.10 (52)	St Kilda	13.15 (93)	MCG	29 August 1914
South Melbourne	10.18 (78)	Melbourne	5.5 (35)	Lake Oval	29 August 1914
Richmond	8.9 (57)	Carlton	9.9 (63)	Punt Road Oval	29 August 1914

== Ladder ==
(P)	Premiers
	Qualified for finals

#	Team	P	W	L	D	PF	PA	%	Pts
1	Carlton (P)	18	13	3	2	1122	865	129.7	56
2	South Melbourne	18	12	5	1	1113	1017	109.4	50
3	Fitzroy	18	12	6	0	1177	858	137.2	48
4	Geelong	18	11	6	1	1122	874	128.4	46
5	Collingwood	18	10	7	1	1114	928	120.0	42
6	Essendon	18	9	7	2	1139	944	120.7	40
7	St Kilda	18	9	8	1	1243	1052	118.2	38
8	Richmond	18	8	10	0	1084	1077	100.6	32
9	Melbourne	18	2	16	0	922	1505	61.3	8
10	University	18	0	18	0	813	1729	47.0	0

Rules for classification: 1. premiership points; 2. percentage; 3. points for
Average score: 60.3
Source: AFL Tables

== Finals series ==
All of the 1914 finals were played at the MCG so the home team in the semi-finals and Preliminary Final is purely the higher ranked team from the ladder but in the Grand Final the home team was the team that won the Preliminary Final.

=== Semi-finals ===
Home team	Score	Away team	Score	Venue	Date
South Melbourne	5.14 (44)	Geelong	5.7 (37)	MCG	5 September
Carlton	9.8 (62)	Fitzroy	5.12 (42)	MCG	12 September

=== Preliminary final ===
Home team	Score	Away team	Score	Venue	Date
South Melbourne	5.13 (43)	Carlton	3.6 (24)	MCG	19 September

== Season notes ==
- Claude Bryan made his VFL debut for University in Round 1 using the pseudonym R.V. Kinnear, due to his clearance from his Tasmanian club Cananore having not been finalised.
- A crowd of 2,000 angry Carlton fans mobbed the field umpire after Carlton lost to St Kilda in round 2.
- In Round 14, Collingwood full-forward Dick Lee kicked eleven goals in the victory over University, equalling the record set by Jim McShane in 1899 for the most goals by a player in a game.
- In Round 16, a spectator ran onto the ground during the Essendon and South Melbourne match and hit Essendon captain Alan Belcher behind the ear. Belcher chased the spectator, struck him, and was reported for unseemly play. Belcher was cleared by the VFL tribunal.
- In round 16, University lost its 49th consecutive match, breaking the record of 48 consecutive VFL losses set by St Kilda in 1897–1899. University dropped out of the league at the end of the season having lost its last 51 matches, which as of 2026 remains the longest winless streak in VFL/AFL history, and the second-longest in the major state leagues behind Glenelg's 56 consecutive losses from 1921 to 1924.
- In his 27th and final game of VFL football in round 18, Arthur Fitzroy Best kicked the entire Melbourne score of 5.5 (35).
- The preliminary final between South Melbourne and Carlton on 19 September was held following a curtain-raiser, with South Yarra defeating Collingwood District in the 1914 Metropolitan Amateur Football Association grand final.

== Awards ==
- The 1914 VFL Premiership team was Carlton.
- The VFL's leading goalkicker was Dick Lee of Collingwood with 57 goals.
- University took the "wooden spoon" in 1914.

== Sources ==
- "1914". AFL Tables.
- "1914 VFL season". Australian Football.
