= Hassett =

Hassett is an Irish surname and may refer to:

== People ==
- Betsy Hassett (born 1990), New Zealand association football player
- Billy Hassett (1921–1992), American basketball player
- Brendan Hassett, American mathematician
- Brenna Hassett, American British bioarchaeologist
- Buddy Hassett (1911–1997), American baseball player
- Christopher R. Hassett, American founder of PointCast, software company
- Cormac Hassett, Irish cricketer
- David Hassett (born 1947), Australian politician
- Dick Hassett (1909–2006), Australian cricketer
- Frank Hassett, (1918–2008), Australian general
- Gavin Hassett (born 1973), Canadian rower
- Harry Hassett (1905–1971), Australian tennis player
- Jack Hassett (1880–1942), Australian rules footballer
- Jim Hassett (1887–1964), Irish hurler
- Joe Hassett (born 1955), American basketball player
- John Hassett (died 1955), Irish politician
- Johnny Hassett (1891–1972), Australian rules footballer
- John Blennerhassett (landowner) (also known as John Hassett, died 1573), English landowner
- Kevin Hassett (born 1962), American economist
- Liam Hassett (born 1975), Irish footballer
- Lindsay Hassett (1913–1993), Australian cricketer
- Marilyn Hassett (born 1947), American actress
- Matt Hassett (1932–2025), Irish hurler and lawyer
- Mike Hassett, Irish footballer
- Peter Hassett, managing editor of Russian Machine Never Breaks, an American hockey blog
- Ronald Hassett (1923–2004), New Zealand major general
- Steve Hassett, member of Australian band Luluc
- William Hassett, member of the Knights of Columbus
- William D. Hassett Jr. (1936–2000), American businessman
- Thomas Hassett (Irish nationalist) (1841–1893), escaped prisoner during the Catalpa rescue

== Other uses ==
- Hassett, Nova Scotia, Canada
- Marin-Hassett House, a historic house in St. Augustine, Florida, United States

== See also ==
- Hasset Go (1986–2015), Filipino celebrity chef
- Haskett, a surname
- Hasselt (disambiguation)
