= Haskett =

Haskett (alternately Hesketh, Heskett, Heskit, Haskett, Hasketts, Hackett etc.) is an English surname of Norman origin. People bearing the name include:

- Chris Haskett (born 1962), American guitarist
- Dan Haskett (born 1952), African-American animator who designed "Belle" for Disney's Beauty and the Beast
- Dianne Haskett (born 1955), mayor of London, Ontario, Canada, from 1994 to 2000
- Jack Haskett (1911–1992), Australian rules footballer
- Jane Haskett Bock (née Haskett), professor emerita in biology at the University of Colorado, Boulder
- Irwin Haskett (1903–1994), Canadian politician and cabinet minister
- Max Haskett, former trumpet player in the American rock band Starship

== See also ==
- Askett
- Hassett (disambiguation)
- Hesket (disambiguation)
