= Electoral results for the district of Caulfield East =

Victoria, Australia, district election results

This is a list of electoral results for the electoral district of Caulfield East in Victorian state elections.

== Members for Caulfield East ==
Member	Party	Term
Alexander Fraser	Liberal	1955–1958

== Election results ==
=== Elections in the 1950s ===
1955 Victorian state election: Caulfield East
Party	Candidate	Votes	%	±%
Liberal and Country	Alexander Fraser	12,165	58.1	
Labor	Robert Flanagan	5,773	27.6	
Labor (A-C)	Bernard Tarpey	3,011	14.4	
Total formal votes		20,949	98.3	
Informal votes		353	1.7	
Turnout		21,302	93.5	
Two-party-preferred result
Liberal and Country	Alexander Fraser	14,725	70.3	
Labor	Robert Flanagan	6,224	29.7	
Liberal and Country hold		Swing		
