= Roy Park =

Roy Park may refer to:

- Roy H. Park (1910–1993), American media executive
- Roy Park (sportsman) (1892–1947), Australian cricketer and Australian rules footballer
