= Hasselt (disambiguation) =

Hasselt is a Belgian city and municipality.

Hasselt may also refer to:

- Arrondissement of Hasselt, Limburg, Belgium
- Hasselt (Bedburg-Hau), Germany
- Hasselt, Overijssel, Netherlands
- Hasselt, Venlo, Netherlands
- Hasselt University, a university with campuses in Hasselt and Diepenbeek, Belgium
- K.S.C. Hasselt, a Belgian football club
- Arend Ludolf van Hasselt, (1848-1909), a Dutch explorer
- Hasselt, an album by the Evan Parker Electro-Acoustic Ensemble (2012)

== See also ==
- van Hasselt
