= Jack Doubleday =

Australian rules footballer (1890–1918)

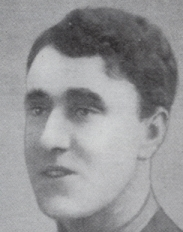

Personal information
- Full name: Jack Lindsay Doubleday
- Born: 28 May 1890; Prahran, Victoria
- Died: 30 October 1918 (aged 28); Indian Ocean
- Original team: Wesley College

Playing career^{1}
Years	Club	Games (Goals)
1912–14	University	36 (17)
1915	Melbourne	17 (4)
Total		53 (21)
- ^{1} Playing statistics correct to the end of 1915.

Jack Lindsay Doubleday (28 May 1890 – 30 October 1918) was an Australian rules footballer who played with University and Melbourne in the Victorian Football League.

== Family ==
The son of John Doubleday (1837–1907), and Elizabeth Josephine Doubleday (1863–1943), née Naeser, Jack Lindsay Doubleday was born at Prahran, Victoria on 28 May 1890.

== Education ==
He was educated at All Saints' Grammar School, in East St Kilda, and at Wesley College, Melbourne (from 1906 to 1910).

He studied dentistry at the University of Melbourne, and graduated Bachelor of Dental Science (BDSc) on 20 December 1916.

== Football ==
=== Melbourne (VFL) ===
The university team withdrew from the VFL competition prior to the 1915 season; and, along with his team-mates Jack Brake, Claude Bryan, Dick Gibbs, Roy Park, and Percy Rodriguez, Doubleday was given a clearance to transfer from University to Melbourne.

== Football ==
In May 1919, an unidentified former Melbourne footballer, wrote to the football correspondent of The Argus as follows:

"In 1914 the Melbourne football team, after its junction with the University, was a fine team, and succeeded in reaching the semi-finals.
Out of this combination the following players enlisted and served at the front:—
C. Lilley (seriously wounded), J. Hassett, H. Tomkins (severely wounded), J. Evans (seriously wounded), W. Hendrie, R. L. Park, J. Doubleday (died), A. Best, C. Burge (killed), C. (viz., A.) Williamson (killed), J. Brake, R. Lowell, E. Parsons (seriously wounded), A. M. Pearce (killed), F. Lugton (killed), A. George, C. Armstrong, P. Rodriguez (killed), J. Cannole (viz., Connole), A. Fraser (seriously wounded), T. Collins.
These are all players of note, and in themselves would have formed a very fine side, but there is only one of them playing at the present time, viz., C. Lilley, who, as a matter of fact, takes the field under some disability owing to severe wounds which he received on service." – The Argus, 16 May 1919.

== Military service ==
A qualified dentist, Doubleday enlisted in the Australian Army Medical Corps on 9 October 1918, and left Australia on 16 October 1918, to serve overseas in the Australian Dental Corps.

== Death ==
He died of spinal meningitis on 30 October 1918, on his way to the Western Front.

He was buried at sea, and is commemorated at the Chatby Memorial in the Shatby district of eastern Alexandria, in Egypt.

== See also ==
- List of Victorian Football League players who died on active service
