= Jack Brake =

Australian rules footballer

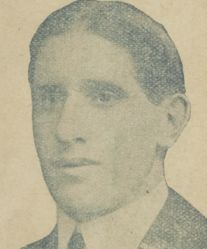

Personal information
- Full name: John Brake
- Born: 11 November 1890; Horsham, Victoria
- Died: 16 May 1970 (aged 79); Castlemaine, Victoria
- Original team: Horsham
- Height: 188 cm (6 ft 2 in)
- Weight: 92 kg (203 lb)
- Position: Ruck

Playing career^{1}
Years	Club	Games (Goals)
1909–1914	University	81 (21)
1915, 1920–1921	Melbourne	17 (2)
Total		98 (23)
- ^{1} Playing statistics correct to the end of 1921.

Career highlights
- Victorian interstate representative: 1912; University vice captain: 1913; AIF Pioneer Exhibition Game, London, 28 October 1916

John Brake (11 November 1890 – 16 May 1970) was a former leading Australian rules footballer who played with University and Melbourne in the Victorian Football League (VFL).

== Family ==
The son of James Hugh Brake (1853–1915), and Barbara Stevenson Brake (1856–1930), née McDougall, John Brake was born at Horsham, Victoria on 11 November 1890.

He married Grace Glendinning Taylor (1890–1976) on 19 July 1921.

== Education ==
Brake was educated at the Princes Hill High School, the Hawthorn College, and the University of Melbourne.

=== Bachelor of Agricultural Science (B.Agr.Sc.) ===
Enrolled at the University of Melbourne in 1910, he graduated B.Agr.Sc. (Bachelor of Agricultural Science) in April 1916, attending the conferral ceremony in his AIF uniform.

== Athletics ==
He was a champion schoolboy track and field athlete.

At the 1914 Australasian Athletics Championships, with a height of 11 ft (3.35m) – Brake set a new record for a Victorian Amateur, breaking the record he had set (10 ft 6in) at the Victorian Championships in February 1912) – he tied for first place in the pole vault with the visiting Stanford University athlete Dink Templeton.

While at the University of Melbourne he was awarded a triple blue: for athletics, football, and rifle shooting.

== Football ==
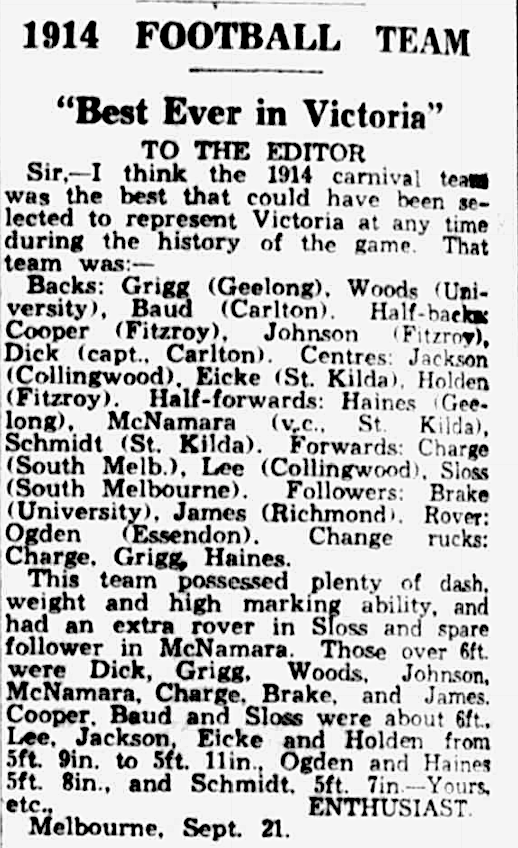
Enthusiast's Letter to the Editor The Herald, 21 Sept. 1934.

=== University (VFL) ===
Generally regarded as one of university's few great players, Brake usually played in the ruck.

He tried out with Melbourne in the 1909 pre-season. He was vice captain of the university side in 1913.

It is good news to footballers to hear that Jack Brake, the champion follower, has arranged to come to town two out of every three Saturdays, during the season. He is at [the University's] Dookie College, and is keenly anxious to play for the old team. In order to catch the morning train, it is necessary for him to motor-cycle 26 miles over rough country. He has to cover the same distance on returning on Saturday nights or Sunday mornings.

=== Victoria ===
He represented Victoria in 1912.

=== Melbourne (VFL) pre-AIF service ===
The university team withdrew from the VFL competition prior to the 1915 season; and, along with his team-mates Claude Bryan, Jack Doubleday, Dick Gibbs, Roy Park, and Percy Rodriguez, Brake was given a clearance to transfer from University to Melbourne.

=== Pioneer Exhibition Game (1916) ===
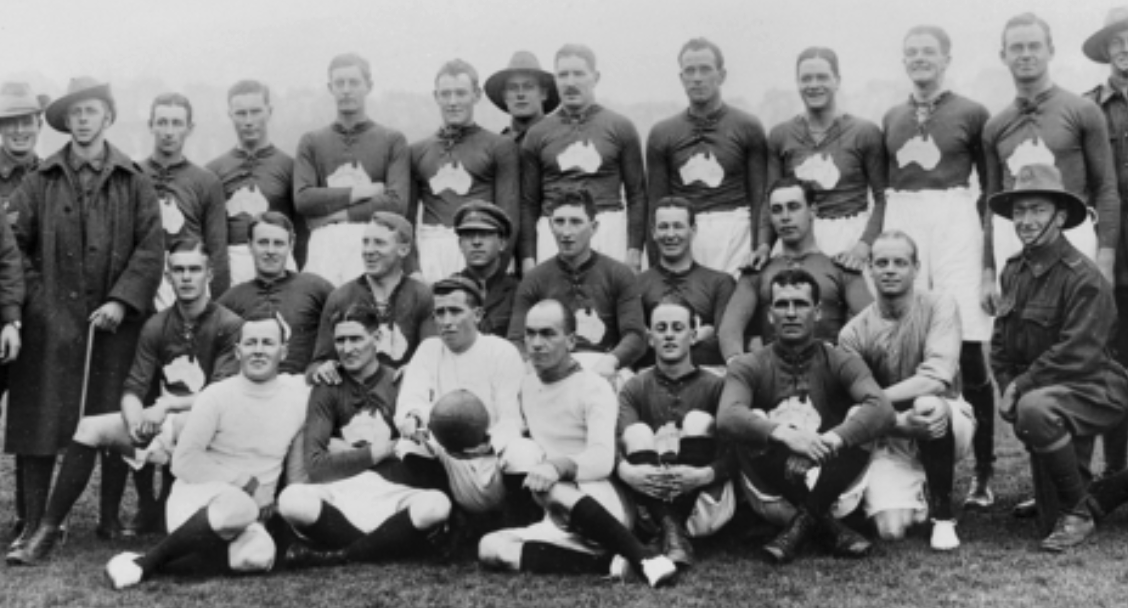
The Third Australian Divisional Team: 28 October 1916. Jack Brake is the fifth player from left, back row.

Brake was stationed with the 3rd Division in London when an Australian rules match was organised for 28 October 1916 between two teams of Australian servicemen in aid of the British and French Red Cross.

Promoted as the "Pioneer Exhibition Game of Australian Football in London", Brake represented the Third Australian Divisional Team against Australian Training Units at Queen's Club, West Kensington before an estimated crowd of 3,000, including the (then) Prince of Wales (later King Edward VIII), and King Manuel II of Portugal. A news film was taken at the match.

=== Melbourne (VFL) post-AIF service ===
As with many players at the time, World War I severely interrupted his career. In May 1919, an unidentified former Melbourne footballer, wrote to the football correspondent of The Argus as follows:

"In 1914 the Melbourne football team, after its junction with the University, was a fine team, and succeeded in reaching the semi-finals.
Out of this combination the following players enlisted and served at the front:—
C. Lilley (seriously wounded), J. Hassett, H. Tomkins (severely wounded), J. Evans (seriously wounded), W. Hendrie, R. L. Park, J. Doubleday (died), A. Best, C. Burge (killed), C. (viz., A.) Williamson (killed), J. Brake, R. Lowell, E. Parsons (seriously wounded), A. M. Pearce (killed), F. Lugton (killed), A. George, C. Armstrong, P. Rodriguez (killed), J. Cannole (viz., Connole), A. Fraser (seriously wounded), T. Collins.
These are all players of note, and in themselves would have formed a very fine side, but there is only one of them playing at the present time, viz., C. Lilley, who, as a matter of fact, takes the field under some disability owing to severe wounds which he received on service." — The Argus, 16 May 1919.

Brake continued to appear sporadically for Melbourne after World War I, finally retiring in 1921 after 17 matches with Melbourne and 98 VFL matches over all.

=== VFL Trubunal ===
Brake later became a member of the VFL Tribunal.

== Military service ==
=== World War I ===
Brake enlisted in the Third Division Artillery of the Australian Imperial Force (AIF) at the start of the war, reaching the rank of Lieutenant.

=== World War II ===
In September 1940 he enlisted in the Second AIF, attaining the rank of Major.

== Death ==
Brake died on 16 May 1970 at Castlemaine, Victoria.

== See also ==
- 1914 Sydney Carnival
- 1916 Pioneer Exhibition Game
