= Arthur Best =

Australian rules footballer

Personal information
- Full name: Arthur Fitzroy Best
- Born: 18 October 1888; Fitzroy, Victoria
- Died: 17 June 1960 (aged 71); Double Bay, New South Wales
- Original teams: Melbourne Grammar, South Yarra
- Height: 175 cm (5 ft 9 in)

Playing career^{1}
Years	Club	Games (Goals)
1912–1913	St Kilda	15 (22)
1914	Melbourne	12 (30)
Total		27 (52)
- ^{1} Playing statistics correct to the end of 1914.

Arthur Best (18 October 1888 – 17 June 1960) was an Australian rules footballer who played for the St Kilda Football Club and Melbourne Football Club in the Victorian Football League (VFL). His father was Sir Robert Best, a prominent politician who served in the Victorian Legislative Assembly and Parliament of Australia.

In September 1914, Best enlisted in the AIF to fight in World War I. He had been working as a salesman prior to enlistment. A member of the 58th Battalion, Best worked his way up from the rank of private to captain. In 1918, he was twice mentioned in dispatches. Best returned safely to Australia in July 1919.

In May 1919, an unidentified former Melbourne footballer, wrote to the football correspondent of The Argus as follows:

"In 1914 the Melbourne football team, after its junction with the University, was a fine team, and succeeded in reaching the semi-finals.
Out of this combination the following players enlisted and served at the front:—
C. Lilley (seriously wounded), J. Hassett, H. Tomkins (severely wounded), J. Evans (seriously wounded), W. Hendrie, R. L. Park, J. Doubleday (died), A. Best, C. Burge (killed), C. (viz., A.) Williamson (killed), J. Brake, R. Lowell, E. Parsons (seriously wounded), A. M. Pearce (killed), F. Lugton (killed), A. George, C. Armstrong, P. Rodriguez (killed), J. Cannole (viz., Connole), A. Fraser (seriously wounded), T. Collins.
These are all players of note, and in themselves would have formed a very fine side, but there is only one of them playing at the present time, viz., C. Lilley, who, as a matter of fact, takes the field under some disability owing to severe wounds which he received on service." – The Argus, 16 May 1919.
