= Charlie Lilley =

Australian rules footballer

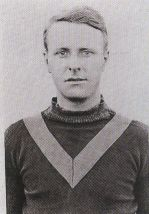

Personal information
- Full name: Charles Harold Lilley
- Born: 3 July 1892; Armadale, Victoria
- Died: 16 June 1982 (aged 89); Heidelberg, Victoria
- Original team: Wangaratta/Elsternwick
- Height: 176 cm (5 ft 9 in)
- Weight: 74.4 kg (164 lb)
- Position: Centre/Defence

Playing career^{1}
Years	Club	Games (Goals)
1913–15, 1919–25	Melbourne	132 (5)
- ^{1} Playing statistics correct to the end of 1925.

Career highlights
- AIF Pioneer Exhibition Game, London, 28 October 1916

Charles Harold Lilley (3 July 1892 – 16 June 1982) was an Australian rules footballer who played with Melbourne in the Victorian Football League (VFL).

== Family ==
The son of Charles William Henry Lilley (1893-1918), and Mary Louisa Lilley (1866-1956), née Wright, Charles Harold Lilley was born at Armadale, Victoria on 3 July 1892.

== Football ==
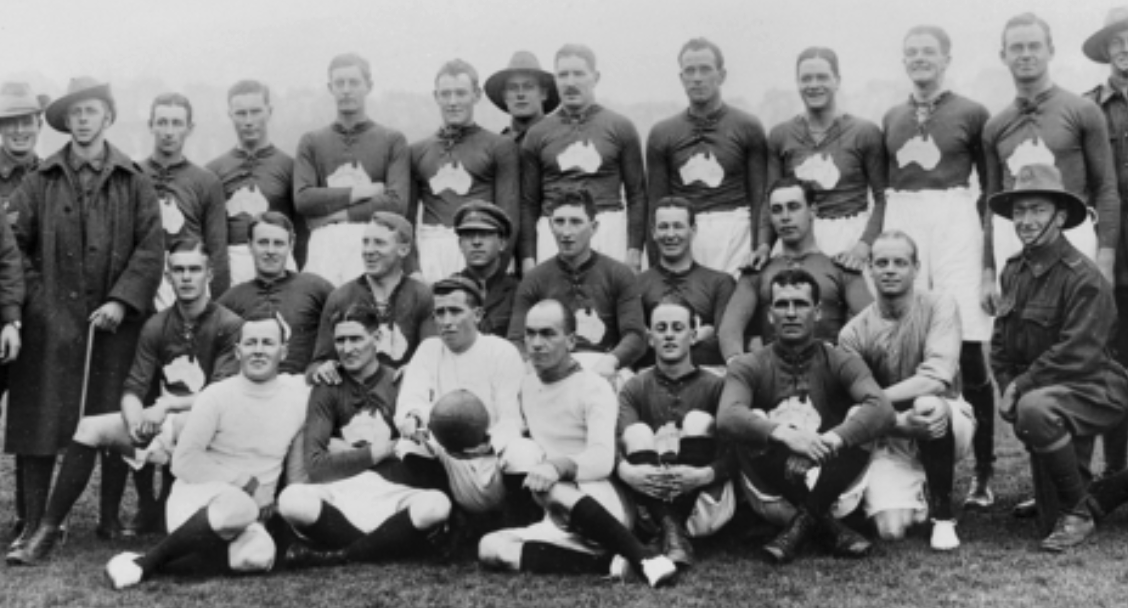
The Third Australian Divisional Team: 28 October 1916. Charlie Lilley is second from left, middle row.

In May 1919, an unidentified former Melbourne footballer, wrote to the football correspondent of The Argus as follows:

"In 1914 the Melbourne football team, after its junction with the University, was a fine team, and succeeded in reaching the semi-finals.
Out of this combination the following players enlisted and served at the front:—
C. Lilley (seriously wounded), J. Hassett, H. Tomkins (severely wounded), J. Evans (seriously wounded), W. Hendrie, R. L. Park, J. Doubleday (died), A. Best, C. Burge (killed), C. (viz., A.) Williamson (killed), J. Brake, R. Lowell, E. Parsons (seriously wounded), A. M. Pearce (killed), F. Lugton (killed), A. George, C. Armstrong, P. Rodriguez (killed), J. Cannole (viz., Connole), A. Fraser (seriously wounded), T. Collins.
These are all players of note, and in themselves would have formed a very fine side, but there is only one of them playing at the present time, viz., C. Lilley, who, as a matter of fact, takes the field under some disability owing to severe wounds which he received on service." — The Argus, 16 May 1919.

== Military service ==
He served in the First AIF during World War One.

He played for the (winning) Third Australian Divisional team in the famous "Pioneer Exhibition Game" of Australian Rules football, held in London, in October 1916. A news film was taken at the match.

== See also ==
- 1916 Pioneer Exhibition Game
