= John Robinson (Australian rules footballer) =

Australian rules footballer

Personal information
- Full name: John Ware Robinson
- Born: 28 December 1891; St Kilda, Victoria
- Died: 25 February 1966 (aged 74); Melbourne, Victoria
- Original team: Caulfield Grammar
- Height: 5ft 11in (180 cm)
- Weight: 12 st (76 kg)

Playing career^{1}
Years	Club	Games (Goals)
1912	University	1 (0)
- ^{1} Playing statistics correct to the end of 1912.

John Ware Robinson (28 December 1891 – 25 February 1966) was an Australian rules footballer who played with University in the Victorian Football League (VFL). He served in the First AIF, and was awarded a Distinguished Conduct Medal in 1917.

== Family ==
The son of Rev. Samuel Robinson (1841-1899), D.D., and Annie Roger Robinson (1860-1939), née Ware, and known as "Jack" to his family, he was born in St Kilda on 28 December 1891. While at the university he was one of the secretaries of the Australian Student Christian Movement; and, by 1922, he was its "travelling secretary".

He married Jean Hawthorne Hutchinson (1899-1990) on 25 July 1923; they had a daughter, Judith MacRae, née Robinson. He died on 25 February 1966.

== Education ==
Educated at Caulfield Grammar School from 1902 to 1911, he studied at the University of Melbourne. His studies were suspended due to his war service; and he eventually graduated Bachelor of Arts (in absentia) in 1921.

== Athletics ==
A fine athlete, he competed in the high jump and 120 yards hurdles for Caulfield Grammar, in the team (which included Dick Gibbs) that won the 1911 Schools Amateur Athletic Association championships.

== Football ==
=== Caulfield Grammar ===
He had been captain of the School's First XVIII at Caulfield Grammar in 1911.

=== University of Melbourne ===
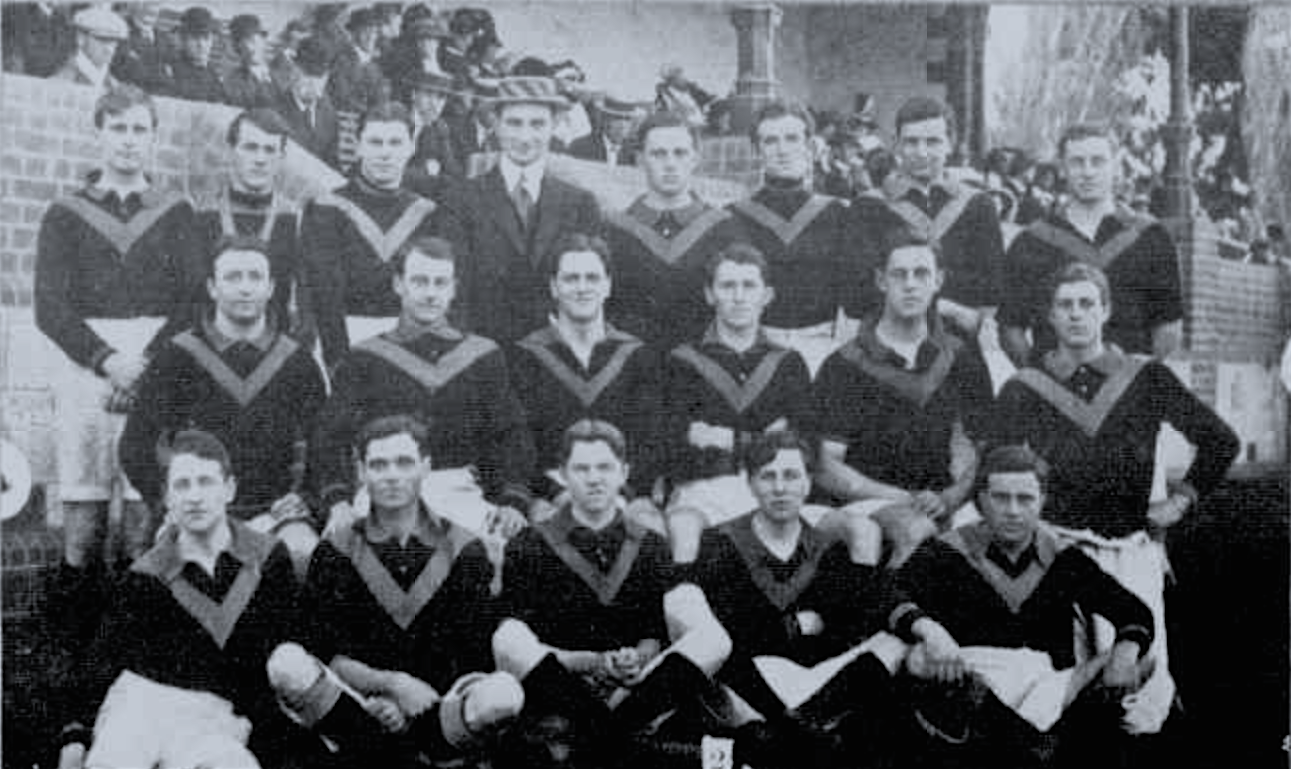
University of Melbourne's team for the annual (inter-varsity) football match against University of Adelaide, played in Adelaide on 12 August 1914 (Robinson is far left, back row).

In addition to playing Inter-Varsity football for the University of Melbourne, and playing for the University in the Metropolitan Amateur Football Association (MAFA) competition, he played well on the single occasion that he appeared for the Melbourne University First XVIII in the VFL competition (on 18 May 1912, against St Kilda). He was awarded a full blue for football in 1913.

The University team withdrew from the VFL competition prior to the 1915 season; and, although he might have been given an automatic clearance to transfer from University to Melbourne, his enlistment meant that he was unable to play any more football at that time.

=== Old Caulfield Grammarians ===
In 1920, when the Metropolitan Amateur Football Association decided to resume its inter-club competition (the competition had been suspended during the war), Old Caulfield Grammarians was one of the eight teams that competed in the competition's first year. Jack Robinson was the team's first captain.

== Military service (WWI) ==
Suspending his University studies, he enlisted in the First AIF in October 1914, and served in the Australian Camel Field Ambulance; and, later, the 3rd Light Horse Field Ambulance. He sustained a gunshot wound in action in 1915, but soon returned to active service. He returned to Australia

=== Military Honours ===
- MiD: Mentioned in dispatches of General Sir Archibald James Murray, Commander-in-Chief of the Egyptian Expeditionary Force (London Gazette, 6 July 1917; Commonwealth of Australia Gazette, 11 October 1917).
- DCM: Distinguished Conduct Medal, "the military decoration that is generally recognised as being only secondary to the Victoria Cross", London Gazette, 24 April 1917; Commonwealth of Australia Gazette, 21 August 1917):

"For gallantry and marked devotion to duty during and after the battle of Magdhaba on 23rd December, 1916. He was conspicuous in his efforts at the successful collection of wounded during and after the battle. But for his untiring and successful efforts many wounded would have undoubtedly been left out overnight. Also at the battle of Rafa on 9th. January 1917, this non-commissioned officer displayed great devotion to duty and rendered splendid service in the collection of wounded under fire. Both in the Field and in Camp he has displayed marked ability as Transport Serjeant." — (Original recommendation in full.)

== Grazier ==
On his return from active service, and having graduated from University, he spent at least twenty years as a sheep grazier on "Nar-Darak", at Molesworth, Victoria.

== Military service (WWII) ==
Robinson enlisted in the Army Reserve in March 1942, at the age of 51, and served until late 1945.

== Death ==
He died at Melbourne, Victoria, on 25 February 1966.

== See also ==
- List of Caulfield Grammar School people
