= Frank Lugton =

Australian sportsman

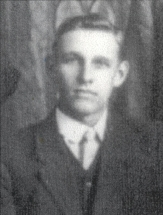

Personal information
- Full name: Frank Leslie Lugton
- Born: 4 November 1893; Northcote, Victoria
- Died: 29 July 1916 (aged 22) near Villers-Bretonneux, France
- Original team: Clifton Hill

Playing career^{1}
Years	Club	Games (Goals)
1913–1914	Melbourne	36 (1)
- ^{1} Playing statistics correct to the end of 1914.

Frank Leslie Lugton (4 November 1893 – 29 July 1916) was an Australian sportsman who played first-class cricket for Victoria and Australian rules football for Melbourne in the Victorian Football League (VFL).

== Family ==
One of the ten children of Charles Edward Lugton (1860-1927), and Jane Ann Lugton (1861-1944), née May, Frank Leslie Lugton was born at Northcote, Melbourne, Victoria on 4 November 1893.

His older brother, Edward Charles Lugton (1885-1939), served as a gunner in the First AIF. Another brother, John Archibald Lugton (1889-1918), also served in the First AIF, and died of wounds sustained in action in August 1918.

Lugton Street, in Alphington, Victoria was named as a local tribute to the three brothers.

== Cricket ==
Lugton was a right-handed batsman and a fast-medium bowler. He played five Sheffield Shield games for the Victorian cricket team in the 1913/1914 season, making 218 runs at 31.14 and taking nine wickets at 34.00.

DEATH OF FRANK LUGTON
It is with extreme regret that I have to announce the death in France of Frank Lugton, the Melbourne footballer, and Northcote cricketer.
He was a fine all-round athlete, and the most lovable young fellow one could imagine.
In cricket he stepped from the colts into the representative team, and gave every promise of developing into a very fine all-round cricketer.
He bowled a fast medium, and had a beautiful off stroke, besides possessing a wonderful pair of hands.
He was amongst the first to volunteer, and all who knew the manly young fellow will sympathise with his people in their great loss.
He was a fine type of Australian manhood, tall and straight as a rush, and was the embodiment of everything that was fair, and generous.
In cricket he came directly under my control, and I can write feelingly of his splendid qualities and untimely end. — Jack Worrall, 16 September 1916.

== Football ==
=== Northcote Methodists (MDFA) ===
He was recruited from the Northcote Methodist Football Club in the Melbourne District Football Association (MDFA).

=== Melbourne (VFL) ===
Lugton made his VFL debut for melbourne in 1913, and played 18 games in both 1913 and 1914.

In May 1919, an unidentified former Melbourne footballer, wrote to the football correspondent of The Argus as follows:

"In 1914 the Melbourne football team, after its junction with the University, was a fine team, and succeeded in reaching the semi-finals.
Out of this combination the following players enlisted and served at the front:—
C. Lilley (seriously wounded), J. Hassett, H. Tomkins (severely wounded), J. Evans (seriously wounded), W. Hendrie, R. L. Park, J. Doubleday (died), A. Best, C. Burge (killed), C. (viz., A.) Williamson (killed), J. Brake, R. Lowell, E. Parsons (seriously wounded), A. M. Pearce (killed), F. Lugton (killed), A. George, C. Armstrong, P. Rodriguez (killed), J. Cannole (viz., Connole), A. Fraser (seriously wounded), T. Collins.
These are all players of note, and in themselves would have formed a very fine side, but there is only one of them playing at the present time, viz., C. Lilley, who, as a matter of fact, takes the field under some disability owing to severe wounds which he received on service." — The Argus, 16 May 1919.

== Military service ==
Lugton survived the fighting in Gallipoli but went on to serve in France where he was killed in 1916, near Villiers-Bretonneux. He was the first Sheffield Shield cricketer to lose his life in the war.

The first Sheffield Shield player to fall in the great contlict was that promising young Northcote cricketer Frank Lugton.
He enlisted nearly two years ago, prior to attaining his majority, with practically the whole of his athletic life in front of him, and was only 22 at the time of his death.
His friends, and they were legion, received a painful shock when the notification came through of his being killed in France.
He had attained the rank of lance-corporal, but I happen [sic] to know that he enlisted purely as a matter of duty.
He came of a fighting stock, and his ancestors fought at Culloden.
Frank always had a splendid arm, and could throw the cricket ball a hundred yards.
He naturally took to "bombing" work at Gallipoli, and had charge of a grenade party.
His C.O. told him jokingly on one occasion that on his return to Melbourne he could see him in his mind's eye putting a match to the crioket ball before he delivered it.
Prior to his death he had some narrow shaves on the peninsula.
He was buried by a shell explosion for six hours before being rescued, necessitating his being transferred to the hospital for a period; and another time had the bolt of his rifle shot off by a Turkish sniper whilst he was sighting for a shot at the selfsame sniper.
The Turk happened to fire first, but Frank got his afterwards from a less exposed position. —"Short Stop", 18 November 1916.

== Death ==
Aged 22, he was killed in action near Villers-Bretonneux, France on 29 July 1916.

=== Obituary ===
Frank Lugton, of the Northcote Cricket Club, is another of the leading Victorian cricketers who has made the supreme sacrifice.
He lost his life fighting in Prance.
Lugton was considered by good judges to have been one of Victoria's coming cricketers.
He was selected by Mr. J. Worrall for several of the interstate colts' matches, wherein he performed well, and he was a member of the last Victorian team to visit Tasmania, where his work with bat and ball was pleasing.
He was one of the leading players of the Melbourne Football Club, his work on the half-hack line being of a high order.
His comrades of the Northcote Baseball Club wore armbands in their match against Williamstown on Saturday as a mark of respect to his memory.
He was of a modest and retiring disposition, and was extremely well liked by all.
The Argus, 11 September 1916.

== See also ==
- List of Victoria first-class cricketers
- List of Victorian Football League players who died on active service
