= Van Hasselt =

Van Hasselt is a Dutch-language toponymic surname, meaning "from Hasselt", a town either in Belgian Limburg, Dutch Limburg, Overijssel, the District of Kleve, or East Frisia . Notable people with this surname include the following:

- Johan Coenraad van Hasselt (1797–1823), Dutch physician, zoologist, botanist and mycologist
- André Henri Constant van Hasselt (1806–1874), Dutch-Belgian writer and poet
- Alexander Willem Michiel van Hasselt (1814–1902), Dutch entomologist and toxicologist
- Barthold Theodoor Willem van Hasselt (1896–1960), Dutch chief executive
- Arend Ludolf van Hasselt (1848-1909), Dutch explorer and ethnologist
