= Cliff Burge =

Australian rules footballer

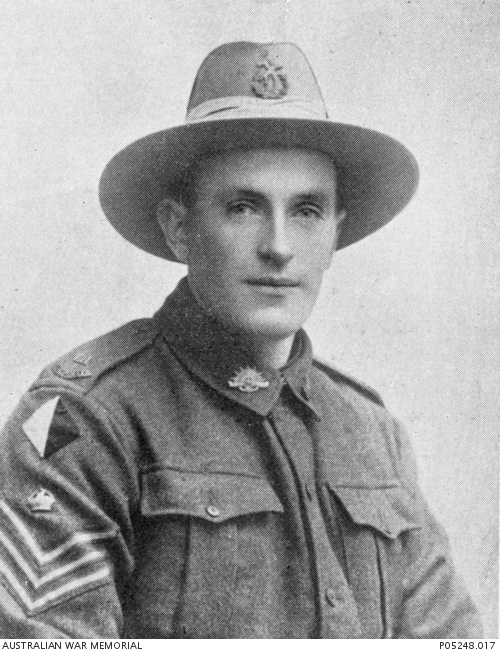
- Enlistment photograph of Burge

Personal information
- Full name: Clifford Charles Burge
- Born: 27 April 1892; Rushworth, Victoria
- Died: 14 August 1918 (aged 26); Villers-Bretonneux, France
- Original team: Elsternwick Juniors
- Height: 6 ft (183 cm)
- Weight: 12 st 6 lb (174 lb; 79 kg)

Playing career^{1}
Years	Club	Games (Goals)
1914	Melbourne	5 (1)
- ^{1} Playing statistics correct to the end of 1914.

Clifford Charles "Cliff" Burge (27 April 1892 – 14 August 1918) was an Australian rules footballer who played with Melbourne in the Victorian Football League.

He was killed in action in World War I in France.

== Family ==
Clifford Burge was the son of Charles Abraham Burge (1863–1939), and Emily Jane Burge, née Morris (1861–1947).

He had two brothers, Trevor Robert William Burge (1895–1953), and Maxwell Lewis Burge (1899–1976), and two sisters, Emily Blanche Burge (1894–1895) and Emily May Burge (1897–1989).

== Education ==
He completed his education at Melbourne High School, where he was a member of the school's First XVIII.

== Football ==
He played five senior games for Melbourne in 1914. He was already in the army by the start of the 1915 season.

In May 1919, an unidentified former Melbourne footballer wrote to the football correspondent of The Argus as follows:

In 1914 the Melbourne football team, after its junction with the University, was a fine team, and succeeded in reaching the semi-finals.
Out of this combination the following players enlisted and served at the front:—
C. Lilley (seriously wounded), J. Hassett, H. Tomkins (severely wounded), J. Evans (seriously wounded), W. Hendrie, R. L. Park, J. Doubleday (died), A. Best, C. Burge (killed), C. (viz., A.) Williamson (killed), J. Brake, R. Lowell, E. Parsons (seriously wounded), A. M. Pearce (killed), F. Lugton (killed), A. George, C. Armstrong, P. Rodriguez (killed), J. Cannole (viz., Connole), A. Fraser (seriously wounded), T. Collins.
These are all players of note, and in themselves would have formed a very fine side, but there is only one of them playing at the present time, viz., C. Lilley, who, as a matter of fact, takes the field under some disability owing to severe wounds which he received on service.

— The Argus, 16 May 1919.

== Military service ==
He enlisted in the First AIF on 19 February 1915. He was promoted to Second Lieutenant on 2 November 1917.

== Death ==
Having fought at Gallipoli, and having survived a German gas attack in June 1918, he was killed in action on 14 August 1918, aged 23, during fighting at Villers-Bretonneux, France, just three months before the end of hostilities.

His (temporarily buried) remains were exhumed in 1920, and he was re-buried at the Villers–Bretonneux Military Cemetery.

== See also ==
- List of Victorian Football League players who died on active service
