= Percy Rodriguez (footballer) =

Australian rules footballer

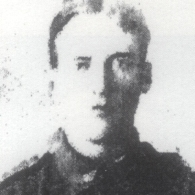

Personal information
- Full name: John Filomeno Rodriguez
- Born: 5 January 1893; Broome, Western Australia
- Died: 20 March 1917 (aged 24); Somme, France
- Original team: Xavier College
- Height: 5 ft 8 in (173 cm)
- Weight: 11 st 7 lb (73 kg)
- Position: wing/rover

Playing career^{1}
Years	Club	Games (Goals)
1914	University	17 (1)
1915	Melbourne	5 (1)
Total		22 (2)
- ^{1} Playing statistics correct to the end of 1915.

John Filomeno "Percy" Rodriguez (Note: Note that many of the press reports relating to Rodriguez and members of his extended family have his family name as "Rodrigues", "Rodriquez", or "Rodriques") (5 January 1893 – 20 March 1917) was an Australian rules footballer who played with University and Melbourne in the Victorian Football League (VFL).

Born in Broome, Western Australia, he was killed in action at France during the Battle of the Somme.

== Family ==
The second of ten children, and the eldest son of pearl fisherman and hotelier Filomeno Francisco "Francis" Rodriguez (1864–1943), and Maud Winifred Gwenevere Rodriguez (1877–1921), née Miller, John Filomeno Rodriguez was born at Broome, Western Australia on 5 January 1893; he was "the first white boy" to be born at Broome.

== Education ==
Educated at Christian Brothers' College, Perth, and Xavier College, Melbourne.

== Football ==
A champion schoolboy footballer at CBC, he was playing senior WAFL football while still at school.

=== Perth (WAFL) ===
He played 31 games for Perth over three seasons, 1910 to 1912, when, on the suggestion of the Perth captain, (Note: former Melbourne and University footballer Harry Cordner) he decided to move to Melbourne. He went to Xavier College (1913–1914); however, because he was too old (at 20) for Associated Public Schools' football, he coached at a junior level at the school.

=== University (VFL) ===
He played 17 games for University duirng the 1914 season.

=== Melbourne (VFL) ===
University withdrew from the VFL competition prior to the 1915 season; and, along with Claude Bryan, Jack Doubleday, Roy Park, he was cleared from University to Melbourne on 31 March 1915.

In May 1919, an unidentified former Melbourne footballer, wrote to the football correspondent of The Argus as follows:

"In 1914 the Melbourne football team, after its junction with the University, was a fine team, and succeeded in reaching the semi-finals.
Out of this combination the following players enlisted and served at the front:—
C. Lilley (seriously wounded), J. Hassett, H. Tomkins (severely wounded), J. Evans (seriously wounded), W. Hendrie, R. L. Park, J. Doubleday (died), A. Best, C. Burge (killed), C. (viz., A.) Williamson (killed), J. Brake, R. Lowell, E. Parsons (seriously wounded), A. M. Pearce (killed), F. Lugton (killed), A. George, C. Armstrong, P. Rodriguez (killed), J. Cannole (viz., Connole), A. Fraser (seriously wounded), T. Collins.
These are all players of note, and in themselves would have formed a very fine side, but there is only one of them playing at the present time, viz., C. Lilley, who, as a matter of fact, takes the field under some disability owing to severe wounds which he received on service." – The Argus, 16 May 1919.

== Military service ==
He enlisted in the First AIF in Melbourne on 1 June 1915 under the name of "Percy John Rodriguez". On 3 February 1917 he was promoted to the rank of Second Lieutenant.

== Death ==
He was killed in action on 20 March 1917 during the Battle of the Somme. He has no known grave. His name is listed on the Villers–Bretonneux Australian National Memorial.

Football followers, particularly those connected with the University and Melbourne clubs, will regret to hear of the death in France of 2nd Lieutenant Percy Rodriguez, the former wing player of the two clubs mentioned. Coming from Western Australia, where. although young, he had already earned a reputation as a dashing player, he joined the University Club, and played with them until they withdrew from the league in 1914. In 1915 he played with Melbourne for a time before departing for the front. His dash and daring on the field, and his quiet, unassuming disposition when off, endeared him to all, and his many friends and admirers here will regret exceedingly that his career has been brought to a close all too soon. He was taking the dental course at the University before enlisting.
The Daily News, 20 September 1917.

== Siblings ==
- Clarence Albert "Clarrie" Rodruiguez (1896–1952), footballer with West Perth, Subiaco, and Claremont-Cottesloe.
- Joseph Holland "Joe" Rodriguez (1894–1973), footballer with Perth.
- Richard Patrick Gerald "Pat" Rodriguez (1900–1964), footballer with West Perth and Subiaco, coach of Claremont-Cottesloe, and administrator.
- Thomas Angelo "Tom" Rodriguez (1908–), footballer with Claremont-Cottesloe.

Percy and Joe played together for Perth before Percy left for Melbourne; Clarrie and Pat played together for both West Perth and Subiaco; and Clarrie and Tom played together for Claremont-Cottlesloe.

== See also ==
- List of Victorian Football League players who died on active service
