= Bill Hendrie =

Australian rules footballer

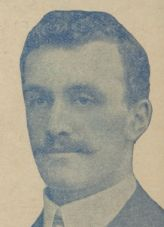

Personal information
- Full name: William Tulloch Hendrie
- Born: 22 January 1884; Richmond, Victoria
- Died: 11 May 1939 (aged 55); Burnley, Victoria
- Original team: Preston

Playing career^{1}
Years	Club	Games (Goals)
1910–15	Melbourne	87 (40)
- ^{1} Playing statistics correct to the end of 1915.

William Tulloch Hendrie (22 January 1884 – 11 May 1939) was an Australian rules footballer who played with Melbourne in the Victorian Football League (VFL).

He is the brother of Hawthorn’s Gil Hendrie.

== Football ==
In May 1919, an unidentified former Melbourne footballer wrote to the football correspondent of The Argus as follows:

"In 1914 the Melbourne football team, after its junction with the University, was a fine team, and succeeded in reaching the semi-finals.
Out of this combination the following players enlisted and served at the front:—
C. Lilley (seriously wounded), J. Hassett, H. Tomkins (severely wounded), J. Evans (seriously wounded), W. Hendrie, R. L. Park, J. Doubleday (died), A. Best, C. Burge (killed), C. (viz., A.) Williamson (killed), J. Brake, R. Lowell, E. Parsons (seriously wounded), A. M. Pearce (killed), F. Lugton (killed), A. George, C. Armstrong, P. Rodriguez (killed), J. Cannole (viz., Connole), A. Fraser (seriously wounded), T. Collins.
These are all players of note, and in themselves would have formed a very fine side, but there is only one of them playing at the present time, viz., C. Lilley, who, as a matter of fact, takes the field under some disability owing to severe wounds which he received on service." — The Argus, 16 May 1919.
