= Jack Evans (footballer, born 1891) =

Australian rules footballer (1891–1966)

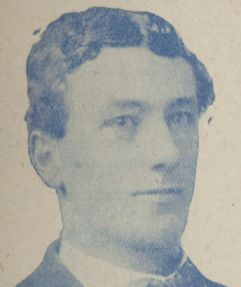

Personal information
- Full name: John Adrian Evans
- Nickname: Dodger
- Born: 28 March 1891; Mount Egerton, Victoria
- Died: 22 October 1966 (aged 75); Preston, Victoria
- Original team: Richmond District
- Height: 174 cm (5 ft 9 in)
- Weight: 72 kg (159 lb)
- Position: Defender

Playing career^{1}
Years	Club	Games (Goals)
1912–15, 1919	Melbourne	61 (5)
- ^{1} Playing statistics correct to the end of 1919.

Jack Evans (28 March 1891 – 22 October 1966) was an Australian rules footballer who played with Melbourne in the Victorian Football League (VFL). Evans' football career was interrupted by serving in World War I. He served in the Army and was a sergeant when awarded the Military Medal in 1918.

== Football ==
In May 1919, an unidentified former Melbourne footballer, wrote to the football correspondent of The Argus as follows:

"In 1914 the Melbourne football team, after its junction with the University, was a fine team, and succeeded in reaching the semi-finals.
Out of this combination the following players enlisted and served at the front:—
C. Lilley (seriously wounded), J. Hassett, H. Tomkins (severely wounded), J. Evans (seriously wounded), W. Hendrie, R. L. Park, J. Doubleday (died), A. Best, C. Burge (killed), C. (viz., A.) Williamson (killed), J. Brake, R. Lowell, E. Parsons (seriously wounded), A. M. Pearce (killed), F. Lugton (killed), A. George, C. Armstrong, P. Rodriguez (killed), J. Cannole (viz., Connole), A. Fraser (seriously wounded), T. Collins.
These are all players of note, and in themselves would have formed a very fine side, but there is only one of them playing at the present time, viz., C. Lilley, who, as a matter of fact, takes the field under some disability owing to severe wounds which he received on service." — The Argus, 16 May 1919.
