= Alf Williamson =

Australian rules footballer (1893–1917)

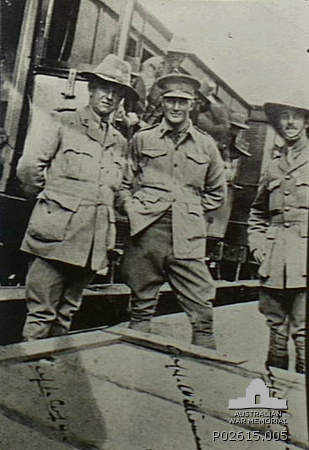
- Williamson (centre) in France during WWI, 1916

Personal information
- Full name: Alfred Williamson
- Nickname: Lofty
- Born: 6 October 1893; Toongabbie, Victoria
- Died: 11 April 1917 (aged 23); Bullecourt, France
- Original team: Teachers Training College
- Height: 183 cm (6 ft 0 in)
- Weight: 81 kg (179 lb)
- Position: Half forward

Playing career^{1}
Years	Club	Games (Goals)
1912–1914	Carlton	11 (2)
1914	Melbourne	8 (5)
Total		19 (7)
- ^{1} Playing statistics correct to the end of 1914.

Alfred Williamson (6 October 1893 – 11 April 1917) was an Australian rules footballer who played for the Carlton Football Club and Melbourne Football Club in the Victorian Football League (VFL).

== Family ==
He was born in Toongabbie, to Reuben and Annie Williamson.

He studied at Sale Agricultural High School; and was transferred to Melbourne High School in 1914, where he was a popular and successful Manual arts teacher. At the time of his enlistment (19 June 1915) he was still working there as a school teacher.

He is the great-uncle of Gary Ablett Sr., and the great-great-uncle of Gary Ablett Jr.

== Footballer ==
Recruited from the Melbourne Teachers Training College, he played his first senior VFL match for Carlton on 18 May 1912, on the half-forward flank, against Collingwood, at Princes Park.

He played two senior games for Carlton in his first year (1912), eight in his second (1913), and one in his third (1914). He transferred to Melbourne, playing his first senior match on 6 June 1914 against University (he scored three goals).

He was suspended for three weeks, when playing for Carlton, in June 1913 for elbowing Allan Belcher in a spiteful match against Essendon on 21 June 1913 (Belcher was suspended for four weeks for elbowing Williamson).

On his transfer to Melbourne, he was suspended for three weeks for "rough conduct" during the 11 July 1914 match against St Kilda, and for 15 weeks for "elbowing and general roughness" during the match against Richmond on 22 August 1914 (his first match on return from the earlier suspension).

In May 1919, an unidentified former Melbourne footballer, wrote to the football correspondent of The Argus as follows:

"In 1914 the Melbourne football team, after its junction with the University, was a fine team, and succeeded in reaching the semi-finals.
Out of this combination the following players enlisted and served at the front:—
C. Lilley (seriously wounded), J. Hassett, H. Tomkins (severely wounded), J. Evans (seriously wounded), W. Hendrie, R. L. Park, J. Doubleday (died), A. Best, C. Burge (killed), C. (viz., A.) Williamson (killed), J. Brake, R. Lowell, E. Parsons (seriously wounded), A. M. Pearce (killed), F. Lugton (killed), A. George, C. Armstrong, P. Rodriguez (killed), J. Cannole (viz., Connole), A. Fraser (seriously wounded), T. Collins.
These are all players of note, and in themselves would have formed a very fine side, but there is only one of them playing at the present time, viz., C. Lilley, who, as a matter of fact, takes the field under some disability owing to severe wounds which he received on service." – The Argus, 16 May 1919.

== Soldier ==
He enlisted on 19 June 1915; and, according to his service record, he held the rank of sergeant whilst training, was promoted to second lieutenant on 1 February 1916, to lieutenant on 10 March 1916, and to captain on 4 July 1916.

He served with distinction at Gallipoli, Egypt, and in France.

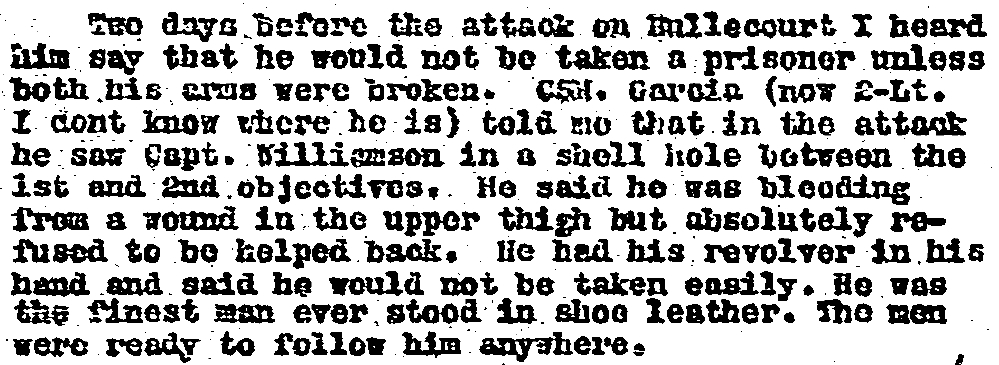
One of the statements gathered by the Red Cross investigating the circumstances of Williamson's wounding.

Considered a natural leader, he was regarded as one of Australia's best officers. Williamson received the Commander in Chief's Congratulatory Card for showing "bravery and initiative".

He was reported wounded and missing in action in France on 11 April 1917; it was later determined (in late November 1917) that he had died in action, on 11 April 1917, at Bullecourt in France fighting with the 14th Battalion.

== See also ==
- List of Victorian Football League players who died on active service
