= Gil Hendrie =

Australian rules footballer, born 1901

- Hendrie in May 1925

Personal information
- Full name: Gilbert John Hendrie
- Born: 15 July 1901; Richmond, Victoria
- Died: 24 June 1968 (aged 66); Mornington, Victoria
- Original team: Camberwell
- Debut: Round 1, 1925, Hawthorn vs. Richmond, at Glenferrie Oval
- Height: 185 cm (6 ft 1 in)
- Weight: 84 kg (185 lb)
- Position: Centre-half forward

Playing career^{1}
Years	Club	Games (Goals)
1925–1927	Hawthorn	17 (9)
- ^{1} Playing statistics correct to the end of 1927.

Gilbert John Hendrie (15 July 1901 – 24 June 1968) was an Australian rules footballer who played with Hawthorn in the Victorian Football League (VFL).

== Family ==
The fifth son of Thomas Bruce Hendrie and Alice Charlotte Ingram, Hendrie grew up in the Hawthorn area. He was the younger brother of Melbourne’s Bill Hendrie and the grandfather of John Hendrie.

== Football ==
A tall man for his era, he was a centre half-forward and originally played for Camberwell Football Club before transferring to Hawthorn when they joined the VFL. He played in 1925 and 1927 and was a prominent member of the team in Hawthorn's first ever VFL match.

== After football ==
Gil Hendrie married Isabella Victoria Deering in 1926 and after football he became a partner in Deering's Bakery in Camberwell before retiring to Mornington.

Gil Hendrie died in 1968 at the age of 66 and was cremated at Springvale Botanical Cemetery.
