= Alf George =

Australian rules footballer

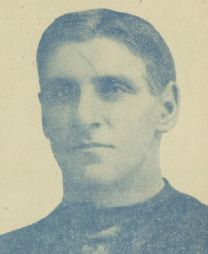

Personal information
- Full name: Alfred Thomas George
- Nickname: Alf
- Born: 7 September 1884; Mount Egerton
- Died: 28 April 1946 (aged 61); Melbourne
- Original team: Numurkah / Essendon Association
- Height: 183 cm (6 ft 0 in)
- Weight: 87 kg (192 lb)
- Positions: Ruck, defender

Playing career^{1}
Years	Club	Games (Goals)
1906–1909	Essendon	33 (0)
1911–1913, 1915	Melbourne	55 (12)
Total		88 (12)
- ^{1} Playing statistics correct to the end of 1915.

Career highlights
- Melbourne captain: 1912–1913

Alfred Thomas George (7 September 1884 – 28 April 1946) was an Australian rules footballer who played for Melbourne and Essendon in the Victorian Football League (VFL). George was the captain of Melbourne for the 1912 and 1913 seasons.

== Early life ==
George was born in Mount Egerton on 7 September 1884. He played football for Seymour, Numurkah and, finally, Essendon Association, before being recruited to play for Essendon.

== Football career ==
=== Essendon ===
George was recruited at the beginning of 1906 and he made his VFL debut in round 3 of that year, going on to play 16 games in his first season. George generally played as a ruckman, but could also play in defence and was known for his marking ability. In total, he played 33 games for Essendon between 1906 and 1909, with his best season for Essendon being his first, where he played in a losing semi final.

=== Melbourne ===
After leaving Essendon at the end of 1909, George did not play in the VFL again until he transferred to Melbourne for the 1911 season. He played 12 matches for the season and kicked his first goal in the VFL. Despite only being at Melbourne for one season, George was named Melbourne's captain for 1912. He was captain for two seasons, and he left the club at the end of 1913. During his two seasons as captain, Melbourne finished sixth and ninth. George returned for one final season in 1915, playing 14 games and kicking two goals; the team concluded the year by losing in a semi final. While playing with Melbourne, George formed a "famous" and "powerful" ruck combination with Hedley Tomkins and Bill Hendrie.

In May 1919, an unidentified former Melbourne footballer, wrote to the football correspondent of The Argus as follows:

"In 1914 the Melbourne football team, after its junction with the University, was a fine team, and succeeded in reaching the semi-finals.
Out of this combination the following players enlisted and served at the front:—
C. Lilley (seriously wounded), J. Hassett, H. Tomkins (severely wounded), J. Evans (seriously wounded), W. Hendrie, R. L. Park, J. Doubleday (died), A. Best, C. Burge (killed), C. (viz., A.) Williamson (killed), J. Brake, R. Lowell, E. Parsons (seriously wounded), A. M. Pearce (killed), F. Lugton (killed), A. George, C. Armstrong, P. Rodriguez (killed), J. Cannole (viz., Connole), A. Fraser (seriously wounded), T. Collins.
These are all players of note, and in themselves would have formed a very fine side, but there is only one of them playing at the present time, viz., C. Lilley, who, as a matter of fact, takes the field under some disability owing to severe wounds which he received on service." — The Argus, 16 May 1919.

=== Prahran ===
After ending his VFL career with Melbourne, George played in the Victorian Football Association (VFA) with Prahran Football Club.

== World War I ==
George worked as an engine driver, both during and after his football career. Due to this background, he enlisted in the Railways Unit of the Australian Imperial Force (AIF) on 10 January 1917. When George enrolled he was immediately given the rank of sergeant and left Australia, to fight on the Western Front, aboard HMAT A70 Ballarat. At the time of embarkation, George was living in Kensington, Victoria with his wife, Lilla. George's service was uncontroversial; he was never wounded, nor did he receive any honours or awards. He returned safely to Australia on 19 August 1919 after the conclusion of the war.

== Later life ==
George died on 28 April 1946 after a long illness. His obituary in The Argus described him as a "champion footballer" who was a "well-known follower in the decade preceding the First World War".
