= Hedley Tomkins =

Australian rules footballer

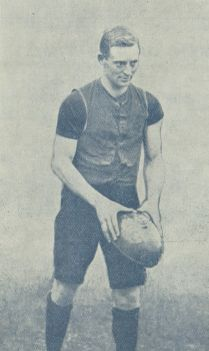

Personal information
- Full name: Hedley Whiteway Tomkins
- Born: 11 June 1885; Northcote, Victoria
- Died: 6 February 1965 (aged 79); Heidelberg, Victoria
- Original team: Leopold (MJFA)
- Position: Rover

Playing career^{1}
Years	Club	Games (Goals)
1904	Fitzroy	4 (0)
1906, 1910–1913	Melbourne	71 (25)
Total		75 (25)
- ^{1} Playing statistics correct to the end of 1913.

Hedley Whiteway Tomkins (11 June 1885 – 6 February 1965) was an Australian rules footballer who played with Fitzroy and Melbourne in the Victorian Football League (VFL).

Tomkins played his early football with Metropolitan Junior Football Association side Leopold, from where he made his way to Fitzroy in 1904. After making just four appearances, the rover was rejected by Fitzroy, deemed to be too small. He would, however, prove a good player for his new club, Melbourne.

His first stint with Melbourne was in the 1906 VFL season and he kicked three goals in his debut, the first of five games he played that year. Over the next three years he played for Preston in the Victorian Football Association. He then returned to Melbourne and was a regular fixture in the side for four seasons, missing only six games during this time. His roving was good enough to earn him a spot in the VFL representative team which competed against South Australia in 1913.

Tomkins, who worked as a travelling salesman, transferred East Perth in 1913. He played 30 games for the club and in 1914 represented Western Australia five times at the 1914 Sydney Carnival, where he won a medal for the "Best stab passing".

In World War I, Tomkins joined the 28th Battalion in the Australian Imperial Forces and fought on the Western Front, where he was badly injured in an artillery barrage during the Battle of the Somme. Hit by a trench mortar, he received 13 wounds in the explosion, to his right leg, abdomen, right arm and left wrist. The most serious of his injuries was to his right leg and he had to have it amputated, below the knee.

== Football ==
In May 1919, an unidentified former Melbourne footballer, wrote to the football correspondent of The Argus as follows:

"In 1914 the Melbourne football team, after its junction with the University, was a fine team, and succeeded in reaching the semi-finals.
Out of this combination the following players enlisted and served at the front:—
C. Lilley (seriously wounded), J. Hassett, H. Tomkins (severely wounded), J. Evans (seriously wounded), W. Hendrie, R. L. Park, J. Doubleday (died), A. Best, C. Burge (killed), C. (viz., A.) Williamson (killed), J. Brake, R. Lowell, E. Parsons (seriously wounded), A. M. Pearce (killed), F. Lugton (killed), A. George, C. Armstrong, P. Rodriguez (killed), J. Cannole (viz., Connole), A. Fraser (seriously wounded), T. Collins.
These are all players of note, and in themselves would have formed a very fine side, but there is only one of them playing at the present time, viz., C. Lilley, who, as a matter of fact, takes the field under some disability owing to severe wounds which he received on service." — The Argus, 16 May 1919.

== Sources ==
- Atkinson, G. (1982) Everything you ever wanted to know about Australian rules football but couldn't be bothered asking, The Five Mile Press: Melbourne. ISBN 0 86788 009 0.
