= Jack Connole =

Australian rules footballer

Personal information
- Full name: John Peter Connole
- Born: 29 July 1890; East Melbourne, Victoria
- Died: 23 May 1958 (aged 67); Parkville, Victoria
- Original team: Coburg

Playing career^{1}
Years	Club	Games (Goals)
1914, 1919	Melbourne	14 (12)
- ^{1} Playing statistics correct to the end of 1919.

John Peter Connole (29 July 1890 – 23 May 1958) was an Australian rules footballer who played with Melbourne in the Victorian Football League (VFL).

In May 1919, an unidentified former Melbourne footballer, wrote to the football correspondent of The Argus as follows:

"In 1914 the Melbourne football team, after its junction with the University, was a fine team, and succeeded in reaching the semi-finals.
Out of this combination the following players enlisted and served at the front:—
C. Lilley (seriously wounded), J. Hassett, H. Tomkins (severely wounded), J. Evans (seriously wounded), W. Hendrie, R. L. Park, J. Doubleday (died), A. Best, C. Burge (killed), C. (viz., A.) Williamson (killed), J. Brake, R. Lowell, E. Parsons (seriously wounded), A. M. Pearce (killed), F. Lugton (killed), A. George, C. Armstrong, P. Rodriguez (killed), J. Cannole (viz., Connole), A. Fraser (seriously wounded), T. Collins.
These are all players of note, and in themselves would have formed a very fine side, but there is only one of them playing at the present time, viz., C. Lilley, who, as a matter of fact, takes the field under some disability owing to severe wounds which he received on service." — The Argus, 16 May 1919.
