= Joe Pearce (footballer) =

Australian rules footballer (1885–1915)

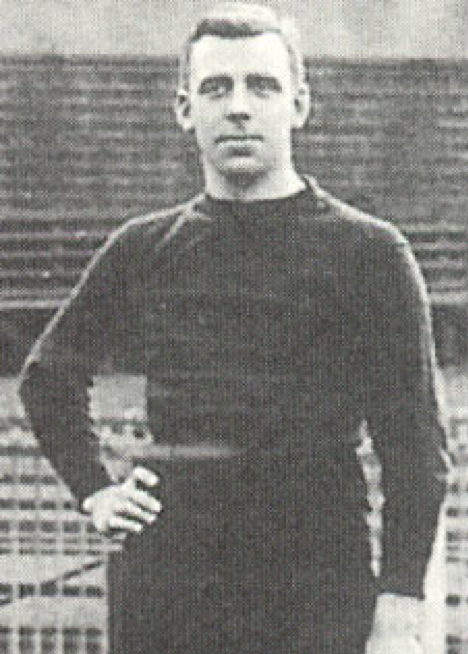

Personal information
- Full name: Arthur Mueller Pearce
- Born: 28 January 1885; Sandhurst, Victoria
- Died: 25 April 1915 (aged 30); Anzac Cove, Gallipoli, Ottoman Turkey
- Original team: South Bendigo
- Height: 184 cm (6 ft 0 in)
- Weight: 80 kg (176 lb)

Playing career^{1}
Years	Club	Games (Goals)
1904–1913	Melbourne	152 (5)
- ^{1} Playing statistics correct to the end of 1913.

Arthur Mueller "Joe" Pearce (28 January 1885 – 25 April 1915) was an Australian rules footballer who played with Melbourne in the Victorian Football League (VFL). Throughout his life, he was always known as "Joe".

He was a member of the First AIF, and was killed in action whilst landing at Gallipoli, Ottoman Turkey on 25 April 1915, during the Gallipoli campaign. His 152 League games became the most of any VFL player killed in World War I.^{[a]}

== Family ==
The son of Arthur John Pearce, the headmaster of the Bendigo Grammar School, and Lena Margaret Pearce, née Mueller, he was born at Sandhurst (Bendigo) on 28 January 1885. He was educated at Bendigo Grammar School, and was employed in a well-paid position in the Australian Mutual Provident Society, firstly in Bendigo, and then in Melbourne.

Once he had moved to Melbourne he became very involved in the community of the Anglican Holy Trinity Church, in East Melbourne; he was Church Treasurer, the Sunday School Superintendent, the Secretary of the Church of England Men's Society, and a member of the church choir.

His cousin, Jack Mueller, played 216 senior VFL games for Melbourne from 1934 to 1950.

== Footballer ==
Recruited from the South Bendigo Football Club in 1904, he played as a strict amateur, and even refused to accept out of pocket expenses.

He played his first senior game for Melbourne, aged 19, against Collingwood, at the MCG, on Saturday, 14 May 1904 (round two). Pearce played well in a Melbourne team that lost by 6 points to Collingwood.

He played his last senior match for Melbourne against Essendon, on the MCG, on Saturday, 30 August 1913 (round eighteen). Essendon won by 10 points, 6.16 (52) to 6.6 (42), and Pearce was one of the best players in a losing team.

A specialist full-back, Pearce was a regular player for Melbourne from 1904 to 1913, and was noted for "clear[ing] his goal with a dash which took the ball past the centre", playing 152 games, and represented Victoria at the 1908 Melbourne Carnival.

In 1922, champion full-forward Dick Lee, who played for Collingwood from 1906 to 1922, told a reporter that he thought that Pearce was, by far, the best full-back of his day; and only matched in that time (1922) by the current Richmond full-back Vic Thorp.

== Sportsman ==
He played sub-district cricket with Coburg, and also played with the Melbourne Cricket Club's Club XI's. He was also good at lawn tennis, and at lacrosse.

== Soldier ==
Leaving his lucrative employment as a clerk with the Australian Mutual Provident Society, he enlisted in the First AIF on 17 August 1914 (he was the eighth man to enlist at Essendon on day one); he was immediate given the rank of Lance-Corporal, and was promoted to Corporal on 6 April 1915.

== Death ==
He was killed in action with the 7th Battalion, whilst taking part in the landings at Gallipoli, Ottoman Turkey on 25 April 1915. He was shot before his boat could reach the beach.

In May 1919, an unidentified former Melbourne footballer, wrote to the football correspondent of The Argus as follows:

"In 1914 the Melbourne football team, after its junction with the University, was a fine team, and succeeded in reaching the semi-finals.
Out of this combination the following players enlisted and served at the front:—
C. Lilley (seriously wounded), J. Hassett, H. Tomkins (severely wounded), J. Evans (seriously wounded), W. Hendrie, R. L. Park, J. Doubleday (died), A. Best, C. Burge (killed), C. (viz., A.) Williamson (killed), J. Brake, R. Lowell, E. Parsons (seriously wounded), A. M. Pearce (killed), F. Lugton (killed), A. George, C. Armstrong, P. Rodriguez (killed), J. Cannole (viz., Connole), A. Fraser (seriously wounded), T. Collins.
These are all players of note, and in themselves would have formed a very fine side, but there is only one of them playing at the present time, viz., C. Lilley, who, as a matter of fact, takes the field under some disability owing to severe wounds which he received on service." – The Argus, 16 May 1919.

== Remembered ==
He was buried at No 2 Outpost Cemetery, Gallipoli, Turkey (one and a half miles from where he first landed), and his name is located name is located at panel 51 in the Commemorative Area at the Australian War Memorial. A bronze memorial plaque was erected at the Holy Trinity Church, East Melbourne.

On Saturday, 12 June 1915, playing against Essendon (in round eight), "the Melbourne players wore black armbands, as a token of respect for a former comrade, Lance-Corporal Pearce, a well-known back man of a few seasons ago, who was killed in action at the Dardanelles".

As a devoted church-man, Joe Pearce would have most likely been pleased to know that he was the subject of a sermon, "Football, the Game and the Barracker", delivered by Rev. Ernest George Petherick (1879–1950) at the Horsham Presbyterian Church on Sunday, 12 September 1926.

His sister Ethel, and a "F.W. Hastings" each inserted an "In Memoriam" notice in the newspaper, every year, at least until 1956.

== See also ==
- List of Australian military personnel killed at Anzac Cove on 25 April 1915
- List of Victorian Football League players who died on active service
- 1908 Melbourne Carnival

== Notes ==
^{a} East Fremantle's "Hooky" Doig, a member of that famous football family, played 225 games for Old Easts – sixteen more than Thomas – between 1899 and 1912 before being killed in World War I at the age of forty.
