= Rupe Lowell =

Australian rules footballer

Personal information
- Full name: Rupert Leslie Lowell
- Born: 30 August 1893; Richmond, Victoria
- Died: 5 November 1980 (aged 87); Portland, Victoria
- Original team: Hawthorn (MJFA)
- Position: Wing

Playing career^{1}
Years	Club	Games (Goals)
1913	Essendon	11 (0)
1914–15	Melbourne	9 (0)
Total		20 (0)
- ^{1} Playing statistics correct to the end of 1915.

Rupert Leslie Lowell (30 August 1893 – 5 November 1980) was an Australian rules footballer who played with Essendon and Melbourne in the Victorian Football League (VFL).

== Football ==
=== Melbourne (VFL) ===
He played his last VFL game for Melbourne two days after enlisting with the First AIF.

In May 1919, an unidentified former Melbourne footballer, wrote to the football correspondent of The Argus as follows:

"In 1914 the Melbourne football team, after its junction with the University, was a fine team, and succeeded in reaching the semi-finals.
Out of this combination the following players enlisted and served at the front:—
C. Lilley (seriously wounded), J. Hassett, H. Tomkins (severely wounded), J. Evans (seriously wounded), W. Hendrie, R. L. Park, J. Doubleday (died), A. Best, C. Burge (killed), C. (viz., A.) Williamson (killed), J. Brake, R. Lowell, E. Parsons (seriously wounded), A. M. Pearce (killed), F. Lugton (killed), A. George, C. Armstrong, P. Rodriguez (killed), J. Cannole (viz., Connole), A. Fraser (seriously wounded), T. Collins.
These are all players of note, and in themselves would have formed a very fine side, but there is only one of them playing at the present time, viz., C. Lilley, who, as a matter of fact, takes the field under some disability owing to severe wounds which he received on service." — The Argus, 16 May 1919.

== Death ==
He died at Portland, Victoria on 5 November 1980.
