= Charlie Armstrong (footballer) =

Australian rules footballer

Personal information
- Full name: Charles Stanley Armstrong
- Born: 10 March 1883; Holbrook, New South Wales
- Died: 2 June 1954 (aged 71); Glen Huntly, Victoria
- Original team: South Yarra
- Height: 185 cm (6 ft 1 in)
- Weight: 80 kg (176 lb)

Playing career^{1}
| Years | Club | Games (Goals) |
| 1912 | Geelong | 15 (3) |
| 1913–14, 1919 | Melbourne | 30 (1) |
| Total | | 45 (4) |
- ^{1} Playing statistics correct to the end of 1919.

Charles Stanley Armstrong (10 March 1883 – 2 June 1954) was an Australian rules footballer who played with Geelong and Melbourne in the Victorian Football League (VFL).

He later served in World War I.

In May 1919, an unidentified former Melbourne footballer, wrote to the football correspondent of The Argus as follows:

"In 1914 the Melbourne football team, after its junction with the University, was a fine team, and succeeded in reaching the semi-finals.
Out of this combination the following players enlisted and served at the front:—
C. Lilley (seriously wounded), J. Hassett, H. Tomkins (severely wounded), J. Evans (seriously wounded), W. Hendrie, R. L. Park, J. Doubleday (died), A. Best, C. Burge (killed), C. (viz., A.) Williamson (killed), J. Brake, R. Lowell, E. Parsons (seriously wounded), A. M. Pearce (killed), F. Lugton (killed), A. George, C. Armstrong, P. Rodriguez (killed), J. Cannole (viz., Connole), A. Fraser (seriously wounded), T. Collins.
These are all players of note, and in themselves would have formed a very fine side, but there is only one of them playing at the present time, viz., C. Lilley, who, as a matter of fact, takes the field under some disability owing to severe wounds which he received on service." — The Argus, 16 May 1919.
