= Tim Collins (footballer) =

Australian rules footballer (1889–1971)

Personal information
- Full name: Timothy James Collins
- Born: 24 December 1889; Melbourne
- Died: 19 September 1971 (aged 81); Camberwell, Victoria
- Original team: Hawthorn (MJFA)

Playing career^{1}
| Years | Club | Games (Goals) |
| 1914–15 | Melbourne | 20 (20) |
- ^{1} Playing statistics correct to the end of 1915.

Timothy James Collins (24 December 1889 – 19 September 1971) was an Australian rules footballer who played with Melbourne in the Victorian Football League (VFL).

== Football ==
Hawthorn's captain in the MJFA before joining Melbourne, Collins never played again after seriously injuring his knee in the second quarter of the round 13, 1915 loss to Collingwood.

In May 1919, an unidentified former Melbourne footballer, wrote to the football correspondent of The Argus as follows:

"In 1914 the Melbourne football team, after its junction with the University, was a fine team, and succeeded in reaching the semi-finals.
Out of this combination the following players enlisted and served at the front:—
C. Lilley (seriously wounded), J. Hassett, H. Tomkins (severely wounded), J. Evans (seriously wounded), W. Hendrie, R. L. Park, J. Doubleday (died), A. Best, C. Burge (killed), C. (viz., A.) Williamson (killed), J. Brake, R. Lowell, E. Parsons (seriously wounded), A. M. Pearce (killed), F. Lugton (killed), A. George, C. Armstrong, P. Rodriguez (killed), J. Cannole (viz., Connole), A. Fraser (seriously wounded), T. Collins.
These are all players of note, and in themselves would have formed a very fine side, but there is only one of them playing at the present time, viz., C. Lilley, who, as a matter of fact, takes the field under some disability owing to severe wounds which he received on service." — The Argus, 16 May 1919.

== Military service ==
He subsequently enlisted to serve in World War I.

== Death ==
He died at Camberwell, Victoria on 19 September 1971.

== See also ==
- 1916 Pioneer Exhibition Game
