= Electoral district of Caulfield East =

Former state electoral district of Victoria, Australia

Caulfield East Victoria—Legislative Assembly
- State: Victoria
- Created: 1955
- Abolished: 1958
- Namesake: Caulfield East
- Demographic: Metropolitan
- Coordinates: 37°53′S 145°03′E

Electoral district of Caulfield East was an electoral district of the Legislative Assembly in the Australian state of Victoria.

== Members for Caulfield East ==
Member	Party	Term
Alexander Fraser	Liberal	1955–1958

== See also ==
- Parliaments of the Australian states and territories
- List of members of the Victorian Legislative Assembly
