= Jim Hassett =

Irish hurler

Personal information
- Native name: Séamus Haiséid (Irish)
- Born: 3 June 1887 Quin, County Clare, Ireland
- Died: 3 December 1964 (aged 77) Rathmines, Dublin, Ireland
- Occupation: Civil servant

Sport
- Sport: Hurling
- Position: Right wing-back
Clubs
- Years: Club
- Clooney-Quin; Collegians; Civil Service
Inter-county
Years	County	Apps (scores)
1916-1921	Cork	10 (3-13)
Inter-county titles
- Munster titles: 2
- All-Irelands: 1

John Joseph Hassett (3 June 1887 – 3 December 1964) was an Irish hurler who played as a right corner-back for the Cork senior team.

Hassett made his first appearance for the team during the 1916 championship and became a regular player over subsequent seasons until 1921. During that time he won one All-Ireland winner's medals and two Munster winner's medals.

At club level Hassett played with the Collegians club in Cork and the Civil Service club in Dublin.
