= Jack Hassett =

Australian rules footballer

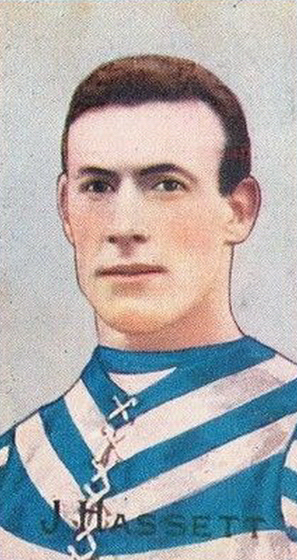
- Cigarette card of Hassett in 1909

Personal information
- Full name: John Joseph Hassett
- Born: 15 August 1880; Geelong, Victoria
- Died: 7 September 1942 (aged 62); Liverpool, New South Wales
- Position: Rover

Playing career^{1}
Years	Club	Games (Goals)
1902–05	South Melbourne	38 (22)
1907–09	Geelong	34 (29)
Total		72 (51)
- ^{1} Playing statistics correct to the end of 1909.

Jack Hassett (15 August 1880 – 7 September 1942) was an Australian rules footballer who played with South Melbourne and Geelong in the Victorian Football League (VFL).

== Family ==
The son of John James Hassett (1858–1919), and Honora (Nora) Hassett (1853–1911), nee Mulcahy, John Joseph Hassett was born on 15 August 1880 in Geelong.

== Football ==
Hassett was a follower and his career had a degree of controversy.

=== Port Melbourne (VFA) ===
Despite the fact that he lived in Geelong, his first senior games were with Port Melbourne in the Victorian Football Association.

=== South Melbourne (VFL) ===
Having returned to Geelong in 1901, he began playing with South Melbourne in 1902; and, although the VFL permit committee apparently disapproved, nothing was done to prevent him. Hassett went on to play a total of 38 games over three and a half seasons with South, but controversy attended him once more when, after alleged involvement in misdemeanours during a trip to Sydney, he was sacked.

=== North Broken Hill (BHFL) ===
In 1906, he played with the North Broken Hill Football Club in the Broken Hill Football League, and, in Adelaide on Saturday 25 August, playing as the captain of the Combined Barrier Ranges Football team, he was best-on-the-ground (kicking 3 goals) in the team that lost to a combined SAFL side 6.7 (43) to 9.14 (68). He returned to Victoria on 21 September 1906.

=== Geelong (VFL) ===
On 12 June 1907, Hassett was cleared from Broken hill to play with Geelong, and soon showed that he had lost none of his dash, agility and long kicking prowess.

He spent a further three years with Geelong; and played a further 34 VFL games before his career ended after a serious ankle injury and then failing to appear when selected a few weeks later.

== Death ==
He died at Liverpool, New South Wales on 7 September 1942.
