= Hesket =

Hesket is the name of several locations:

- Hesket, Cumbria, a civil parish in the United Kingdom
- Hesket, Victoria, a locality in Australia

== Etymology ==
For its etymology see Hesketh (disambiguation)#Etymology.
