= Alexander Fraser (Australian politician) =

Australian politician (1892–1965)

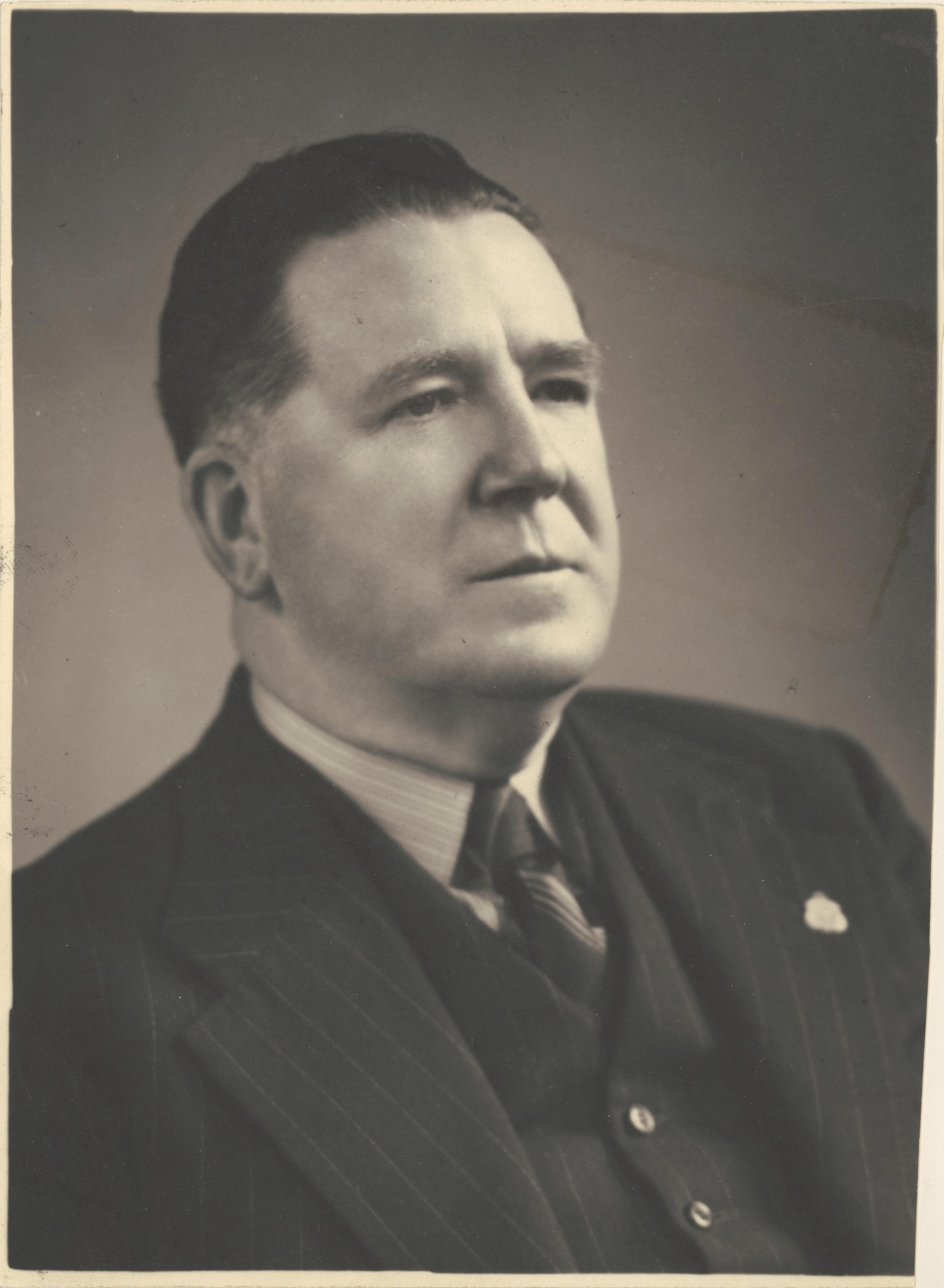
- Fraser, c. 1846

Senator for Victoria
- In office 15 May 1946 – 27 September 1946
- Preceded by: Richard Keane
- Succeeded by: Jack Devlin

Member of the Victorian Legislative Assembly for Grant
- In office 13 May 1950 – 5 December 1952
- Preceded by: Frederick Holden
- Succeeded by: Leslie D'Arcy

Member of the Victorian Legislative Assembly for Caulfield East
- In office 28 May 1955 – 30 May 1958

Member of the Victorian Legislative Assembly for Caulfield
- In office 31 May 1958 – 9 July 1965
- Preceded by: Joe Rafferty
- Succeeded by: Ian McLaren

Personal details
- Born: Alexander John Fraser; 22 August 1892 Fairfield, Victoria, Australia
- Died: 9 July 1965 (aged 72) Malvern, Victoria, Australia
- Party: United Country (1946–52); Liberal (1955–61)
- Spouse: Ivy Elizabeth Hume (m. 1919) Catherine Boyd (m. 1929) Ilene Blackley (m. 1955)
- Children: 3 sons, 2 daughters
- Education: Melbourne University
- Occupation: Businessman
Australian rules football career
Playing career
Years	Club	Games (Goals)
1914–1915	Melbourne	10 (2)
Total		10 (2)

Alexander John Fraser MC (22 August 1892 – 9 July 1965) was an Australian politician.

Fraser was educated at Kyneton College in Kyneton, Victoria, before becoming a company manager. He was a good enough Australian rules footballer to play ten games for Melbourne in the 1914 and 1915 Victorian Football League seasons.

In May 1919, an unidentified former Melbourne footballer, wrote to the football correspondent of The Argus as follows:

"In 1914 the Melbourne football team, after its junction with the University, was a fine team, and succeeded in reaching the semi-finals.
Out of this combination the following players enlisted and served at the front:—
C. Lilley (seriously wounded), J. Hassett, H. Tomkins (severely wounded), J. Evans (seriously wounded), W. Hendrie, R. L. Park, J. Doubleday (died), A. Best, C. Burge (killed), C. (viz., A.) Williamson (killed), J. Brake, R. Lowell, E. Parsons (seriously wounded), A. M. Pearce (killed), F. Lugton (killed), A. George, C. Armstrong, P. Rodriguez (killed), J. Cannole (viz., Connole), A. Fraser (seriously wounded), T. Collins.
These are all players of note, and in themselves would have formed a very fine side, but there is only one of them playing at the present time, viz., C. Lilley, who, as a matter of fact, takes the field under some disability owing to severe wounds which he received on service." — The Argus, 16 May 1919.

He served in the First Australian Imperial Force, 10th Machine Gun Company from 1915 to 1919 with the rank of Lieutenant. He was awarded a Military Cross and wounded three times. He was an organiser with the Australian Producers' Wholesale Federation from 1937 to 1946. From 1946 to 1948, he was Secretary of the United Country Party of Victoria, and also served as chairman of government advisory bodies. On 15 May 1946, he was appointed to the Australian Senate as a Country Party Senator for Victoria, filling the vacancy caused by the death of Labor Senator Richard Keane. He was defeated at the 1946 election, but in 1950 entered the Victorian Legislative Assembly as the member for Grant. He left the Assembly in 1952, but returned in 1955 as the Liberal Party member for Caulfield East, transferring to Caulfield in 1958. He was Minister for State Development in 1959 and Minister for Forests 1959–1961. Fraser died in 1965.

Victorian Legislative Assembly
Preceded by Frederick Holden	Member for Electoral district of Grant; 1950–1952	Succeeded by Leslie D'Arcy
New seat	Member for Caulfield East; 1955–1958	seat abolished
New seat	Member for Caulfield; 1958–1965	Succeeded by Ian McLaren
