= Roy Park (sportsman) =

Australian sportsman

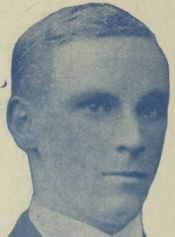

Personal information
- Full name: Roy Lindsay Park
- Nickname: Little Doc
- Born: 30 July 1892; Charlton, Victoria
- Died: 23 January 1947 (aged 54); Middle Park, Victoria
- Original team: Wesley College, Melbourne
- Height: 5 ft 5 in (165 cm)
- Weight: 8 st 11 lb (56 kg)
- Position: Forward

Playing career^{1}
Years	Club	Games (Goals)
1912–1914	University	44 (111)
1915	Melbourne	13 (35)
1920–1921	Footscray (VFA)	28 (72)
Total		85 (218)
- ^{1} Playing statistics correct to the end of 1921.

Career highlights
- VFL leading goalkicker 1913; University leading goalkicker 1912, 1913, 1914; Melbourne leading goalkicker 1915

Roy Lindsay Park (30 July 1892 – 23 January 1947) was an Australian sportsman and doctor. The son of a Methodist minister, he played cricket for Australia and also Australian rules football in the Victorian Football League (VFL). He was educated at Wesley College, Melbourne. Park also served in the Australian Imperial Force in World War I.

== Football career ==
Park started his senior VFL career at University, making his debut in 1912. He had an immediate impact as the club's leading goal kicker with 22. Park's 53 goals in the 1913 VFL season was bettered only by Fitzroy's Jimmy Freake with 56.

Little interest was manifested in the meeting of Richmond and University at Richmond [Cricket Ground on 13 August 1913], the local men displaying more knowledge and better tactics than the students, and winning handsomely.
The real concern in the game centred in the doings of Roy Park, the students' goal sneak, a great favourite on all grounds.
Notwithstanding that his side has not won a game, Park's success has been phenomenal, his judgment standing out among his comrades' like an oasis in a desert.
After the match the opposition supporters, who were carried away by the boy's marvellous accuracy [in kicking five goals], rushed the ground and carried him in shoulder high – a unique tribute in these degenerate days. – The Australasian, 6 September 1913.

Park had medical studying commitments at Melbourne University in 1914, keeping him out of four games, but still managed to kick 36 goals for the season, which was University's last in the VFL.

In 1915 Park played with Melbourne, where he kicked 35 goals in 13 games, but was suspended for four matches for striking Gerry Balme of St Kilda, despite three witnesses coming forward to say that Park had not hit the player at all. Park refused to play football again after his suspension, ending his VFL career with 146 goals in 57 matches. However, following the end of the war, Park returned to football, playing with Footscray – he was conducting his medical practice in Footscray at the time – who were then a member of the Victorian Football Association (VFA). In the 1920 second semi-final replay, Park won the match for Footscray against North Melbourne with a dramatic kick that dribbled through for a goal with less than ten seconds left on the clock.

== World War I ==
A registered medical practitioner, Park enrolled in the Australian Army Medical Corps of the Australian Imperial Force on 12 July 1917. Upon enrolling, Park was given the rank of captain and left Australia on 4 August 1917 aboard HMAT Themistocles. He served with the 5th Field Ambulance Unit and was mentioned in dispatches in the London Gazette on 11 July 1919 and in the Commonwealth of Australia Gazette on 30 October 1919. Park returned safely to Australia on 2 June 1919 after the conclusion of World War I.

In May 1919 an unidentified former Melbourne footballer, wrote to the football correspondent of The Argus as follows:

"In 1914 the Melbourne football team, after its junction with the University, was a fine team, and succeeded in reaching the semi-finals.
Out of this combination the following players enlisted and served at the front:—
C. Lilley (seriously wounded), J. Hassett, H. Tomkins (severely wounded), J. Evans (seriously wounded), W. Hendrie, R. L. Park, J. Doubleday (died), A. Best, C. Burge (killed), C. (viz., A.) Williamson (killed), J. Brake, R. Lowell, E. Parsons (seriously wounded), A. M. Pearce (killed), F. Lugton (killed), A. George, C. Armstrong, P. Rodriguez (killed), J. Cannole (viz., Connole), A. Fraser (seriously wounded), T. Collins.
These are all players of note, and in themselves would have formed a very fine side, but there is only one of them playing at the present time, viz., C. Lilley, who, as a matter of fact, takes the field under some disability owing to severe wounds which he received on service." — The Argus, 16 May 1919.

== Cricket career ==
Roy Park
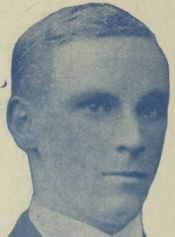

Cricket information
- Batting: Right-handed
- Bowling: Right-arm off-spin

International information
- National side: Australia
- Only Test (cap 113): 31 December 1920 v England

Career statistics
Competition	Test	First-class
Matches	1	36
Runs scored	0	2,514
Batting average	0.00	39.28
100s/50s	0/0	9/10
Top score	0	228
Balls bowled	6	226
Wickets	0	3
Bowling average	–	46.33
5 wickets in innings	–	0
10 wickets in match	–	0
Best bowling	–	1/15
Catches/stumpings	0/–	13/–
- Source: CricInfo, 8 August 2021

Park was a cricket prodigy at Wesley College. His schoolmate Robert Menzies, future Prime Minister of Australia, recalled reading Shakespeare behind the school practice nets, "so that he could partake of the bard whilst watching Park bat." Park played for South Melbourne Cricket Club in the Victorian Cricket Association (VCA), and starred as a right-handed opening batsman, including a 315-run opening partnership with future Australian Test captain Bill Woodfull, for many years a club record. He became the youngest man to lead the batting averages for Melbourne Cricket Club. He was chosen as part of Warwick Armstrong's 1914/15 Australian team for a stillborn tour of South Africa:

At Melbourne, Park had been one of the youngsters sent to the "special net" for Armstrong's attention. Armstrong had been impressed, Park awestruck, later crediting Armstrong with "most of my cricket brains". They were an odd sight in partnership, like a planet and its satellite, but their simpatico was deep. During the match against South Australia, for example, Park joined his captain with an hour left of the second day and shared a thunderous stand. Over lunch on the third day, with Park 226 and himself 101, Armstrong recalled his own eight-year-old record score for Victoria: "Parky, you haven't far to go to beat my 250. I promise to do my best to stop there while you make them." Park did not make it, but always remembered the gesture.

Park also notched up some fine performances for Victoria, and soon earned a Test call-up in the 1920–21 season. He was unsuccessful in his debut against England at the Melbourne Cricket Ground (MCG), making a first-ball duck in his only innings, and bowling a single over of off-spinners which went for nine runs. He was said to have been called late during the night for medical duties, and not to have got any sleep before his debut. He never played Test cricket again. Legend has it that his wife, who was watching in the stands, dropped a stitch in her knitting as he prepared to face his first ball, looked down to retrieve it at the moment of delivery, and thus missed his entire Test batting career.

At first-class level, he made 2514 runs at an average of just under 40, scoring nine centuries, with a highest score of 228. Following his retirement from cricket, Park held numerous administrative positions, including the South Melbourne delegate to the VCA and Victorian selector. In 1953 a memorial plaque honouring Park was unveiled in South Melbourne by the Mayor of South Melbourne.

Park's son-in-law, Ian Johnson, who married his daughter, Lal, was a captain of the Australian cricket team in the 1950s and a member of The 1948 Invincibles.

== See also ==
- List of Australian rules football and cricket players
