= Jane Haskett Bock =

American academic

Jane Haskett Bock is a professor emerita in biology at the University of Colorado, Boulder.

== Early life ==
Bock was born Jane Haskett. She intended to follow her mother’s footsteps as a chemist, but once in college, she decided to switch to botany. She received a bachelor's degree from Duke University, a master's degree from Indiana University Bloomington, and earned a PhD in Botany from the University of California at Berkeley in 1966. She has one daughter with husband and zoologist Carl E. Bock, where they were both directors of the "Research Ranch" in Arizona. Additionally, both taught at the University of Colorado in 1968.

== Career ==
In 1982, a medical examiner approached Bock and asked her to identify the food plants in the stomach of a murder victim. She created samples by chewing up food herself and comparing it to the contents of the victim’s stomach. Her work led the police to the killer, and she was regularly recruited to homicide investigations.

== Impact ==
Bock was featured in an episode of Forensic Files in which she helped police catch a killer by identifying a strain of grass that was found at the crime scene, on the body, and on the suspect’s shoes. By proving that the grass from all the sources was identical, she helped police link the suspect to the crime and convict the murderer.

After their time at the "Research Ranch" in Arizona, Bock and her husband published a book in 2000 about their work, The View from Bald Hill.

She is also a significant member of the following groups:

- Forensic Botany, LLC. Founding member.
- American Academy of Forensic Sciences
- Botanical Society of America
- Society for International Conservation
- Society for Conservation Biology
- British Ecological Society
- International Association for Identification
- Necrosearch International, Ltd (Charter Member)
- California Botanical Society

== Awards & Certificates ==
- 2000 Outstanding Women of 1972 (British List)
- Hunt Botanical Library Listing
- Charles A. Lindbergh Fellow
- Hazel Barnes Prize for Research and Teaching, University of Colorado, Boulder Campus, 1997.
- Boulder Faculty Assembly Service Award, 1999
- Lesley Hewes Award for Best Paper - 1998-9.
