= Hasselt, Venlo =

Hamlet near Velden in Venlo, Netherlands

Coordinates: 51°25′36″N 6°9′40″E

Hasselt is a hamlet in the Dutch province of Limburg. It is located in the municipality of Venlo, about 2 km north of the village of Velden (Limburg).
