= Dick Gibbs =

Australian rules footballer

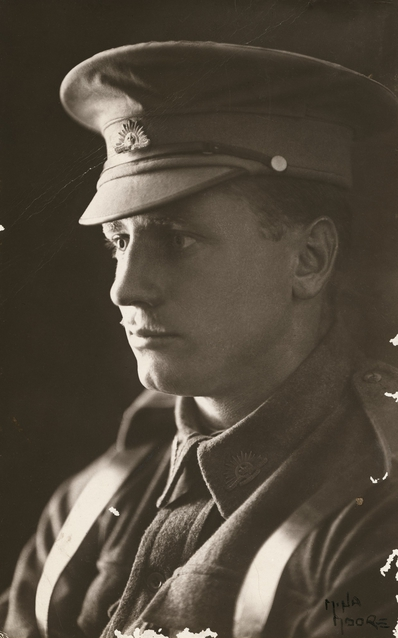

Personal information
- Full name: Richard Horace Maconochie Gibbs
- Born: 4 February 1893; Warracknabeal, Victoria
- Died: 19 July 1916 (aged 23); Fleurbaix, France
- Original team: Caulfield Grammarians

Playing career^{1}
Years	Club	Games (Goals)
1912–14	University	35 (3)
1915	Melbourne	0 (0)
Total		35 (3)
- ^{1} Playing statistics correct to the end of 1915.

Richard Horace Maconochie Gibbs MC (4 February 1893 – 19 July 1916), a medical student and an Australian rules footballer, played with the Melbourne University Football Club in the Victorian Football League.

When the University team withdrew from the VFL competition in 1915, he was transferred to the Melbourne Football Club, but never played a game due to his enlistment in the First AIF. He was killed in action, in France, on 19 July 1916.

== Family ==
The son of physician and surgeon Richard Horace Gibbs (1863-1919), L.R.C.P., L.R.C.S.Ed, L.F.P.S.G., and Helen Gibbs (1868-1959), née Maconochie, Richard Horace Maconochie Gibbs was born at Warracknabeal, Victoria on 4 February 1893. He was a cousin of Lieutenant Walter Horace Carlyle "Lyle" Buntine (1895-1917), MC.

=== Brother's death ===
His younger brother, John Harbinger Gibbs (1897-1917), also attended Caulfield Grammar School, and also served in the First AIF. First taken ill at Gallipoli, John eventually died of illness at his father's Colac home, aged 20, on 13 October 1917, having been repatriated to Australia from England (on 16 July 1917) seriously ill with advanced pulmonary tuberculosis and, initially, he had been admitted to the Caulfield Military Hospital.

=== Father's closure of his medical and surgical practice ===
Greatly distressed by the loss of both sons, his father — who had also been the local area Recruiting Depot's medical examining officer — closed his medical practice in Colac; and, having decided to use his professional skills to provide medical care for the sick and wounded soldiers who were returning to Australia, his father was gazetted a Major in the AIF, and was appointed Senior Surgeon at No 16 Australian General Hospital in Macleod.

=== Father's death ===
On the way home to Malvern on 12 July 1919, his father boarded a Swanston Street cable tram, and was badly injured when he overbalanced and fell from the back platform of the rapidly moving cable tram, upon which he was standing, as it swung round the curve from St Kilda Road into Domain Road, South Yarra. His head hit the roadway, and he sustained a fractured skull, He was taken to the Caulfield Military Hospital, where he died of his injuries on the following day (13 July 1919). His body was taken from the hospital to Spencer Street station, en route to Colac, on Tuesday, 15 July:

"With the No. 3rd district guard band playing the Dead March, the body of Major E. H. Gibbs; senior-surgeon at McLeod Military Hospital, was conveyed from Caulfield Hospital to Spencer-street railway station yesterday. The coffin was curried on a gun carriage, draped with flags, and covered with wreaths. A contingent of 800 returned men, including invalids from McLeod Hospital, in charge of Colonel [Herbert Augustus] Embling, O.C., and Colonel A. H. Sturdee [the Principal Medical Officer for Victoria], represented the district commandant. The funeral will take place at Colac to-day, and arrangements are being made by Colonel [George Alfred] M'Leod, officer commanding local Light Horse, for a military funeral." (The Age, 16 July 1919)

His father was buried in Colac on 16 July "with military honours. A large number of returned men attended. The streets were lined with thousands of spectators."

== Education ==
He was educated at Colac Grammar School and at Caulfield Grammar School, where, in addition to football, he represented the school in both long jump and 440 yards in the team (which included John Robinson) that won the 1911 Schools Amateur Athletic Association's sports meeting, and in swimming. He commenced his medical studies at the University of Melbourne in 1912.

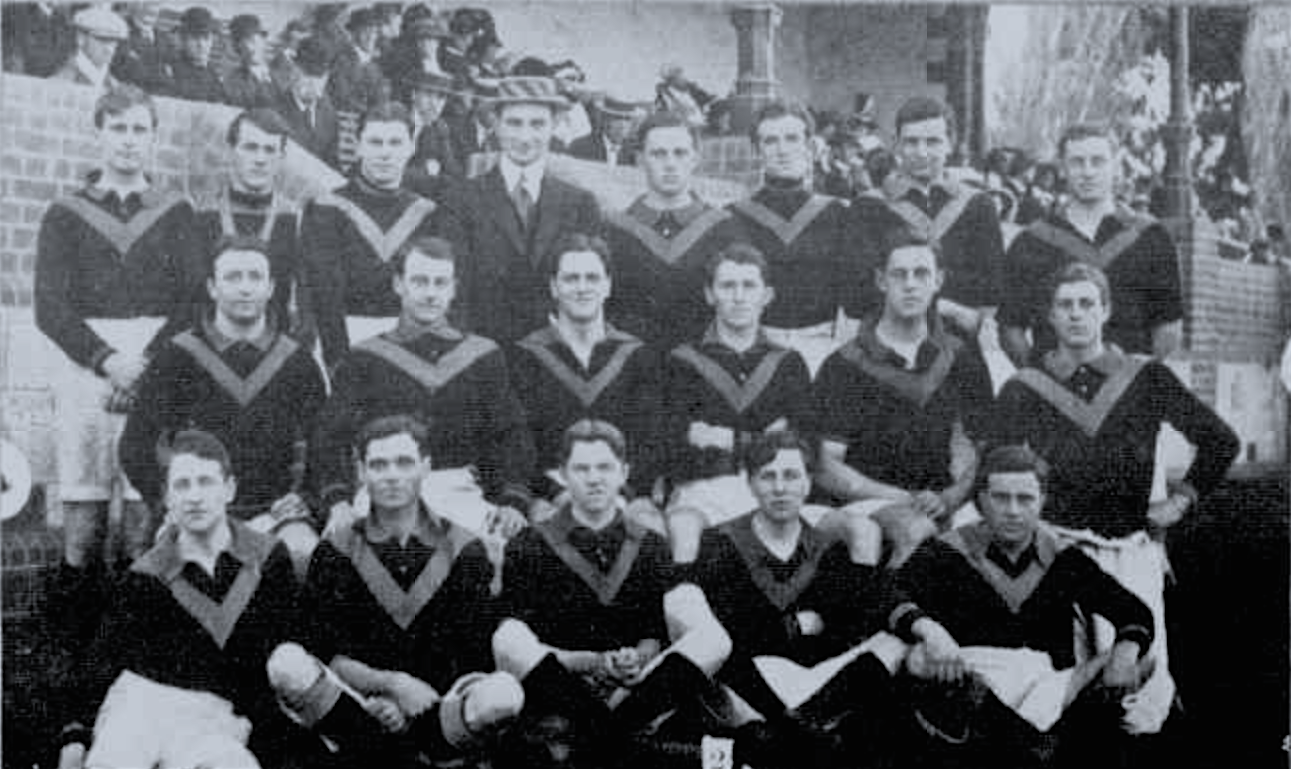
University of Melbourne's team for the annual (inter-varsity) football match against University of Adelaide, played in Adelaide on 12 August 1914 (Gibbs is at far right of back row).

== Football ==
He played Inter-Varsity football for the University of Melbourne; and was awarded a full blue for football.

He played 35 games for the Melbourne University First XVIII in the VFL competition over three seasons (1912-1914). He played well in his first match, against Essendon, on 27 April 1912 (round one), with the reporter remarking that, "although yet only a boy, he marked and kicked so well that he gives great promise".

The University team withdrew from the VFL competition prior to the 1915 season; and, having been given a clearance to transfer from University to Melbourne, Gibbs tried out with Melbourne in the pre-season of 1915. However, his enlistment meant that he was unable to play with Melbourne.

== Military ==
He enlisted in the First AIF in May 1915. At the time he was a third-year medical student at Melbourne University.

On 1 June 1916, Second Lieutenant R. H. M. Gibbs was promoted to Lieutenant.

He was killed on 19 July 1916, in his first clash with the enemy. He was posthumously awarded the Military Cross, "for conspicuous gallantry in action", when leading his troops over a parapet, despite heavy German gunfire:

"At Petillon on the 19th/20th July 1916, when his Company Commander was seriously wounded immediately prior to the order to charge Lieut. Gibbs took charge and led his men over the parapet. By his example the men were spurred on, and although advancing under a galling machine gun and rifle fire he kept his men moving steadily forward in perfect line and order. Lieut. Gibb's calm and collected manner gave his men the impulse necessary to carry them as far as it was possible to go."

He was originally reported as "missing"; and was not reported as "killed in action" until October 1917.

== See also ==
- List of Victorian Football League players who died on active service
- List of Caulfield Grammar School people
