= Claude Bryan =

Australian rules footballer

Personal information
- Full name: Claude Vivian Joseph Bryan
- Born: 23 December 1892; Hobart, Tasmania
- Died: 10 March 1960 (aged 67); Longford, Tasmania
- Original team: Cananore
- Height: 183 cm (6 ft 0 in)
- Weight: 82 kg (181 lb)

Playing career^{1}
Years	Club	Games (Goals)
1914	University	7 (0)
1915, 1920	Melbourne	14 (1)
Total		21 (1)
- ^{1} Playing statistics correct to the end of 1920.

Dr. Claude Vivian Joseph Bryan (23 December 1892 – 10 March 1960) was an Australian rules footballer who played with University and Melbourne in the Victorian Football League (VFL). He played with Cananore in the TFL both before and after his VFL career. Bryan also represented Tasmania at the 1911 Adelaide Carnival.
