= Jack Cannan =

Australian rules footballer

John Henry Cannan
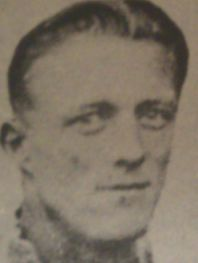

Personal information
- Full name: John Henry Cannan
- Nicknames: Jack, Snowy
- Born: 14 January 1899; Myers Flat, Victoria
- Died: 24 November 1965 (aged 66); Heidelberg, Victoria
- Original team: Bendigo East
- Height: 183 cm (6 ft 0 in)
- Weight: 85 kg (187 lb)
- Position: Half-back

Playing career^{1}
Years	Club	Games (Goals)
1925–26	Melbourne	6 (9)
- ^{1} Playing statistics correct to the end of 1926.

John Cannan (14 January 1899 – 22 November 1965) was an Australian rules footballer who played with Melbourne in the Victorian Football League (VFL). John Henry Cannan wore jersey numbers 33 and 25.

John Cannan was a returned soldier who had served in the 57th Battalion of the Army from 1917, Cannan found his way to the VFL in 1925, initially playing as a half-back.

Legend has it that fans had been promised the debut of a champion Tasmanian player, and when Col Deane's allotted number 33 ran out the fans were duly pleased at his great performance and three goals. Then they were shocked to find out than it was actually "Snowy" Cannan in 33 because Deane was unable to play.

He had played in the Seconds in 1924 before making his debut the next year. Cannan's three goals against Carlton were the highlight of his career, he played just four more matches that year and one early the next season.

In 1927 he was cleared to VFA side Port Melbourne, then played at Williamstown in 1928.

John Cannan married Leah Ellen Delves, granddaughter of former Fitzroy mayor Thomas Delves, in 1927 and they had 11 children.

John Cannan died on 24 November 1965.
