= Mark McKeon =

Australian rules footballer

Personal information
- Full name: Mark McKeon
- Born: 15 May 1957 (age 69)
- Original team: Preston
- Height: 183 cm (6 ft 0 in)
- Weight: 80 kg (176 lb)

Playing career^{1}
Years	Club	Games (Goals)
1978	Melbourne	6 (0)
- ^{1} Playing statistics correct to the end of 1978.

Mark McKeon (born 15 May 1957) is a former Australian rules footballer who played with Melbourne in the Victorian Football League (VFL). Mckeon was a dual Premiership player with Preston in 1983, 1984 and represented the VFA in 1983. He was selected in Preston's Legends Team of the 1980s and 1990s. Mckeon became High Performance Coach for Collingwood for 15 years from 1984 and served as Collingwood's Club Runner for over 200 games.

Mark Mckeon became a well known Keynote Speaker and is the Author of 4 books: Every Day Counts, Work a Little Less, Live a Little More, Mark Mckeon 's Life Tips and Get in the Go Zone.
