= George O'Keeffe =

Australian rules footballer

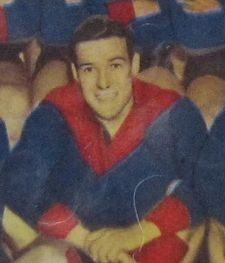

Personal information
- Full name: George Augustus O'Keeffe
- Born: 12 August 1930
- Died: 3 March 2012 (aged 81)
- Original team: East Melbourne
- Height: 171 cm (5 ft 7 in)
- Weight: 64 kg (141 lb)

Playing career^{1}
Years	Club	Games (Goals)
1951–52	Melbourne	13 (1)
- ^{1} Playing statistics correct to the end of 1952.

George Augustus O'Keeffe (12 August 1930 – 3 March 2012) was an Australian rules footballer who played with Melbourne in the Victorian Football League (VFL).
