= Percy Beswicke =

Australian rules footballer

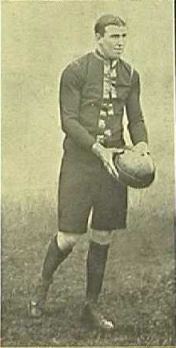

Personal information
- Full name: Percy John Beswicke
- Born: 22 February 1881; Hawthorn, Victoria
- Died: 7 June 1944 (aged 63); Dandenong, Victoria
- Original team: Ferntree Gully

Playing career^{1}
| Years | Club | Games (Goals) |
| 1909–10 | Melbourne | 16 (1) |
- ^{1} Playing statistics correct to the end of 1910.

Percy John Beswicke (22 February 1881 – 7 June 1944) was an Australian rules footballer who played with Melbourne in the Victorian Football League (VFL).
