= Jim Fargie =

Australian rules footballer

Personal information
- Full name: James Fargie
- Born: 30 October 1886; Collingwood, Victoria
- Died: 18 June 1960 (aged 73); South Melbourne, Victoria
- Original team: Abbotsford

Playing career^{1}
Years	Club	Games (Goals)
1909	Melbourne	5 (1)
- ^{1} Playing statistics correct to the end of 1909.

James Fargie (30 October 1886 – 18 June 1960) was an Australian rules footballer who played with Melbourne in the Victorian Football League (VFL).

== Family ==
The son of William McKenzie Fargie (c.1860-1941), and Rachel Fargie (1861–1947), née Whiteley, James Fargie was born in Collingwood, Victoria on 30 October 1886.

He married Adelaide Victoria Jean Teele (1887–1970) on 16 October 1913.
