= Don Hewson =

Australian rules footballer, born 1919

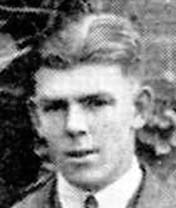

Personal information
- Full name: Donald Neil Hewson
- Born: 28 October 1919
- Died: 12 July 2017 (aged 97)
- Original team: Scotch College
- Height: 182 cm (6 ft 0 in)
- Weight: 80 kg (176 lb)

Playing career^{1}
Years	Club	Games (Goals)
1942–44	Melbourne	16 (0)
- ^{1} Playing statistics correct to the end of 1944.

Donald Neil Hewson (28 October 1919 – 12 July 2017) was an Australian rules footballer who played with Melbourne in the Victorian Football League (VFL).
