= Dave Hardie =

Australian rules footballer

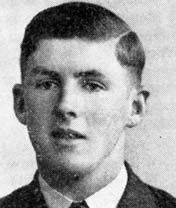

Personal information
- Full name: Dave Hardie
- Born: 8 February 1928
- Died: 9 June 2003 (aged 75)
- Original team: Scotch College
- Height: 179 cm (5 ft 10 in)
- Weight: 77 kg (170 lb)

Playing career^{1}
Years	Club	Games (Goals)
1947–48	Melbourne	7 (3)
- ^{1} Playing statistics correct to the end of 1948.

Dave Hardie (8 February 1928 – 9 June 2003) was an Australian rules footballer who played with Melbourne in the Victorian Football League (VFL).
