= Les Mitchell =

Australian rules footballer

Personal information
- Full name: Leslie James Mitchell
- Born: 15 April 1891; Fitzroy, Victoria
- Died: 5 August 1957 (aged 66); Prince Henry Hospital, Randwick, New South Wales
- Height: 168 cm (5 ft 6 in)
- Weight: 62.5 kg (138 lb)

Playing career^{1}
Years	Club	Games (Goals)
1910	Melbourne	3 (1)
- ^{1} Playing statistics correct to the end of 1910.

Leslie James Mitchell (15 April 1891 – 5 August 1957) was an Australian rules footballer who played with Melbourne in the Victorian Football League (VFL). Mitchell served in the First Australian Imperial Force during World War I.
