= Maurie Bartlett =

Australian rules footballer

Personal information
- Full name: Maurice Adrian Alan Bartlett
- Born: 9 June 1946 (age 80)
- Original team: Bentleigh
- Height: 191 cm (6 ft 3 in)
- Weight: 95.5 kg (211 lb)
- Position: Ruck / Forward

Playing career^{1}
Years	Club	Games (Goals)
1964, 1966	Melbourne	7 (6)
- ^{1} Playing statistics correct to the end of 1966.

Maurice Adrian Alan Bartlett (born 9 June 1946) is a former Australian rules footballer who played with Melbourne in the Victorian Football League (VFL). He also played with Prahran in the Victorian Football Association (VFA).
