= Les Nichols =

Australian rules footballer (1891–1965)

Personal information
- Full name: Alfred Leslie Nichols
- Born: 2 August 1891; Hawthorn, Victoria
- Died: 14 August 1965 (aged 74)
- Original team: Hawthorn Districts
- Height: 183 cm (6 ft 0 in)
- Weight: 79.5 kg (175 lb)

Playing career^{1}
Years	Club	Games (Goals)
1919	Melbourne	1 (0)
- ^{1} Playing statistics correct to the end of 1919.

Alfred Leslie Nichols (2 August 1891 – 14 August 1965) was an Australian rules footballer who played with Melbourne in the Victorian Football League (VFL).
