= Kelvin Clarke (Australian footballer) =

Australian rules footballer

Personal information
- Full name: Kelvin Clarke
- Born: 26 December 1947 (age 78)
- Original team: East Brighton
- Height: 168 cm (5 ft 6 in)
- Weight: 70 kg (154 lb)

Playing career^{1}
Years	Club	Games (Goals)
1969–70	Melbourne	9 (9)
- ^{1} Playing statistics correct to the end of 1970.

Kelvin Clarke (born 26 December 1947) is a former Australian rules footballer who played with Melbourne in the Victorian Football League (VFL).
