= Bob Langford =

Australian rules footballer

Robert Langford

Personal information
- Full name: Robert Langford
- Born: 3 October 1948 (age 78)
- Original team: Bentleigh
- Height: 188 cm (6 ft 2 in)
- Weight: 96 kg (212 lb)
- Position: Full back

Playing career^{1}
Years	Club	Games (Goals)
1966–67	Melbourne	3 (1)
- ^{1} Playing statistics correct to the end of 1967.

Robert Langford (born 3 October 1948) is a former Australian rules footballer who played with Melbourne in the Victorian Football League (VFL).
