= Barry Hodges =

Australian rules footballer (born 1950)

Personal information
- Full name: Barry Hodges
- Born: 20 January 1950 (age 76)
- Original team: Parkdale
- Height: 185 cm (6 ft 1 in)
- Weight: 84 kg (185 lb)

Playing career^{1}
Years	Club	Games (Goals)
1970–1971	Melbourne	7 (2)
- ^{1} Playing statistics correct to the end of 1971.

Barry Hodges (born 20 January 1950) is a former Australian rules footballer who played for the Melbourne Football Club in the Victorian Football League (VFL).
