= Gordon Landy =

Australian rules footballer (1900–1970)

Personal information
- Full name: Clarence Gordon Landy
- Born: 13 January 1900; Footscray, Victoria
- Died: 4 January 1970 (aged 69); East Melbourne, Victoria
- Original team: Navy Office

Playing career^{1}
Years	Club	Games (Goals)
1919	Melbourne	1 (1)
- ^{1} Playing statistics correct to the end of 1919.

Gordon Landy (13 January 1900 – 4 January 1970) was an Australian rules footballer who played with Melbourne in the Victorian Football League (VFL).
