= Jim Jenkinson =

Australian rules footballer

Personal information
- Full name: Jim Jenkinson
- Born: 1 June 1943
- Original team: Hamilton Imperials
- Height: 168 cm (5 ft 6 in)
- Weight: 71 kg (157 lb)
- Position: Rover

Playing career^{1}
Years	Club	Games (Goals)
1962–63	Melbourne	3 (3)
- ^{1} Playing statistics correct to the end of 1963.

Jim Jenkinson (born 1 June 1943) is a former Australian rules footballer who played with Melbourne in the Victorian Football League (VFL).
