= Hugh Bromell =

Australian rules footballer

Personal information
- Full name: Hugh Bromell
- Born: 2 January 1942 (age 84)
- Original team: Hamilton
- Height: 191 cm (6 ft 3 in)
- Weight: 91 kg (201 lb)
- Position: Ruck

Playing career^{1}
Years	Club	Games (Goals)
1965	Melbourne	13 (4)
- ^{1} Playing statistics correct to the end of 1965.

Hugh Bromell (born 2 January 1942) is a former Australian rules footballer who played with Melbourne in the Victorian Football League (VFL).
