= Kelvin Richards =

Australian rules footballer

Personal information
- Full name: Kelvin Richards
- Born: 6 March 1960 (age 66)
- Original team: Melbourne Fourths
- Height: 188 cm (6 ft 2 in)
- Weight: 74.5 kg (164 lb)

Playing career^{1}
Years	Club	Games (Goals)
1978–79	Melbourne	5 (0)
- ^{1} Playing statistics correct to the end of 1979.

Kelvin Richards (born 6 March 1960) is a former Australian rules footballer who played with Melbourne in the Victorian Football League (VFL).
