= Glenn Walley =

Australian rules footballer

Personal information
- Full name: Glenn Walley
- Born: 23 July 1956 (age 70)
- Original team: Bentleigh McKinnon YC
- Height: 182 cm (6 ft 0 in)
- Weight: 80 kg (176 lb)

Playing career^{1}
Years	Club	Games (Goals)
1975–76	Melbourne	3 (2)
- ^{1} Playing statistics correct to the end of 1976.

Glenn Walley (born 23 July 1956) is a former Australian rules footballer who played with Melbourne in the Victorian Football League (VFL).
