= John Corby (footballer) =

Australian rules footballer

Personal information
- Full name: John Armstrong Corby
- Born: 28 December 1898; South Yarra, Victoria
- Died: 15 November 1970 (aged 71); Malvern, Victoria
- Original team: Bank Club

Playing career^{1}
Years	Club	Games (Goals)
1922	Melbourne	1 (1)
- ^{1} Playing statistics correct to the end of 1922.

John Armstrong Corby (28 December 1898 – 15 November 1970) was an Australian rules footballer who played with Melbourne in the Victorian Football League (VFL).
