= Bob Gormly =

Australian rules footballer

Personal information
- Full name: Bob Gormly
- Born: 7 February 1947 (age 79)
- Original team: Old Scotch (Launceston)
- Height: 184 cm (6 ft 0 in)
- Weight: 84 kg (185 lb)

Playing career^{1}
Years	Club	Games (Goals)
1965	Melbourne	1 (0)
- ^{1} Playing statistics correct to the end of 1965.

Bob Gormly (born 7 February 1947) is a former Australian rules footballer who played with Melbourne in the Victorian Football League (VFL).
