= Laurie Queay =

Australian rules footballer

Personal information
- Full name: Laurie Queay
- Born: 17 November 1952 (age 73)
- Original team: Melbourne Thirds
- Height: 182 cm (6 ft 0 in)
- Weight: 79.5 kg (175 lb)

Playing career^{1}
Years	Club	Games (Goals)
1972	Melbourne	2 (2)
- ^{1} Playing statistics correct to the end of 1972.

Laurie Queay (born 17 November 1952) is a former Australian rules footballer who played with Melbourne in the Victorian Football League (VFL).
