= Mal Owens =

Australian rules footballer

Personal information
- Full name: Malcolm James Owens
- Born: 30 January 1952 (age 74)
- Original team: Chelsea
- Height: 188 cm (6 ft 2 in)
- Weight: 83 kg (183 lb)

Playing career^{1}
Years	Club	Games (Goals)
1973–75	Melbourne	16 (3)
- ^{1} Playing statistics correct to the end of 1975.

Malcolm James Owens (born 30 January 1952) is a former Australian rules footballer who played with Melbourne in the Victorian Football League (VFL).
