= Henry McCrae =

Australian rules footballer

Personal information
- Full name: Henry Raymond McCrae
- Born: 24 July 1910; Townsville, Queensland
- Died: 10 July 1984 (aged 73)
- Original team: Melbourne Grammar

Playing career^{1}
Years	Club	Games (Goals)
1929	Melbourne	3 (7)
- ^{1} Playing statistics correct to the end of 1929.

Henry Raymond McCrae (24 July 1910 – 10 July 1984) was an Australian rules footballer who played with Melbourne in the Victorian Football League (VFL).
