= Brett Marchant =

Australian rules footballer

Personal information
- Full name: Brett Marchant
- Born: 29 October 1959 (age 67)
- Original team: Mentone
- Height: 185 cm (6 ft 1 in)
- Weight: 80 kg (176 lb)

Playing career^{1}
Years	Club	Games (Goals)
1977	Melbourne	4 (0)
- ^{1} Playing statistics correct to the end of 1977.

Brett Marchant (born 29 October 1959) is a former Australian rules footballer who played with Melbourne in the Victorian Football League (VFL).
