= Euan Campbell =

Australian rules footballer (born 1945)

Personal information
- Born: 25 September 1945 (age 81)
- Original team: Old Scotch Collegians
- Height: 183 cm (6 ft 0 in)
- Weight: 75 kg (165 lb)

Playing career^{1}
Years	Club	Games (Goals)
1968	Melbourne	1 (0)
- ^{1} Playing statistics correct to the end of 1968.

Euan Campbell (born 25 September 1945) is a former Australian rules footballer who played with Melbourne in the Victorian Football League (VFL).
