= Bruce Leslie =

Australian rules footballer

Personal information
- Full name: Bruce Leslie
- Born: 10 February 1940
- Original team: McKinnon
- Height: 179 cm (5 ft 10 in)
- Weight: 74 kg (163 lb)

Playing career^{1}
Years	Club	Games (Goals)
1961	Melbourne	6 (1)
- ^{1} Playing statistics correct to the end of 1961.

Bruce Leslie (born 10 February 1940) is a former Australian rules footballer who played with Melbourne in the Victorian Football League (VFL).
