= Ed Burston =

Australian rules footballer

Personal information
- Full name: Ed Burston
- Born: 19 January 1944 (age 82)
- Original team: University Blacks
- Height: 193 cm (6 ft 4 in)
- Weight: 85 kg (187 lb)

Playing career^{1}
Years	Club	Games (Goals)
1966	Melbourne	8 (13)
- ^{1} Playing statistics correct to the end of 1966.

Ed Burston (born 19 January 1944) is a former Australian rules footballer who played with Melbourne in the Victorian Football League (VFL).
