= Brent Jones (Australian footballer) =

Australian rules footballer

Personal information
- Full name: Brent Jones
- Born: 4 January 1946 (age 80)
- Height: 191 cm (6 ft 3 in)
- Weight: 85 kg (187 lb)

Playing career^{1}
Years	Club	Games (Goals)
1966–71	Melbourne	45 (5)
- ^{1} Playing statistics correct to the end of 1971.

Brent Jones (born 4 January 1946) is a former Australian rules footballer who played with Melbourne in the Victorian Football League (VFL).
