= John Toll (footballer) =

Australian rules footballer

Personal information
- Full name: John Toll
- Born: 4 February 1946 (age 80)
- Original team: Gunbower
- Height: 183 cm (6 ft 0 in)
- Weight: 85 kg (187 lb)

Playing career^{1}
Years	Club	Games (Goals)
1967	Melbourne	2 (0)
- ^{1} Playing statistics correct to the end of 1967.

John Toll (born 4 February 1946) is a former Australian rules footballer who played with Melbourne in the Victorian Football League (VFL).
