= Garry Byers =

Australian rules footballer

Personal information
- Full name: Garry Byers
- Born: 13 January 1939
- Original team: Glenhuntly
- Height: 188 cm (6 ft 2 in)
- Weight: 76 kg (168 lb)

Playing career^{1}
Years	Club	Games (Goals)
1962–63	Melbourne	5 (2)
- ^{1} Playing statistics correct to the end of 1963.

Garry Byers (born 13 January 1939) is a former Australian rules footballer who played with Melbourne in the Victorian Football League (VFL).
