= Greg MacDonald =

Australian rules footballer

Personal information
- Full name: Greg MacDonald
- Born: 1 December 1954 (age 71)
- Height: 170 cm (5 ft 7 in)
- Weight: 72 kg (159 lb)

Playing career^{1}
Years	Club	Games (Goals)
1973	Melbourne	4 (6)
- ^{1} Playing statistics correct to the end of 1973.

Greg MacDonald (born 1 December 1954) is a former Australian rules footballer who played with Melbourne in the Victorian Football League (VFL).
