= Vince Driver =

Australian rules footballer, born 1908

Personal information
- Full name: Vince Driver
- Born: 7 January 1908
- Died: 17 November 1970 (aged 62)
- Original team: Darling Juniors

Playing career^{1}
Years	Club	Games (Goals)
1928–30	Melbourne	8 (0)
- ^{1} Playing statistics correct to the end of 1930.

Vince Driver (7 January 1908 – 17 November 1970) was an Australian rules footballer who played with Melbourne in the Victorian Football League (VFL).
