= Frank Giampaolo =

Australian rules footballer

Personal information
- Born: 7 February 1954 (age 72)
- Height: 173 cm (5 ft 8 in)
- Weight: 73 kg (161 lb)

Playing career^{1}
Years	Club	Games (Goals)
1973–77	Melbourne	53 (31)
- ^{1} Playing statistics correct to the end of 1977.

Frank Giampaolo (born 7 February 1954) is a former Australian rules footballer who played with Melbourne in the Victorian Football League (VFL).
