= Shane McSpeerin =

Australian rules footballer

Personal information
- Born: 5 August 1952 (age 74)
- Height: 185 cm (6 ft 1 in)
- Weight: 78 kg (172 lb)

Playing career^{1}
Years	Club	Games (Goals)
1971–73	Melbourne	16 (11)
- ^{1} Playing statistics correct to the end of 1973.

Shane McSpeerin (born 5 August 1952) is a former Australian rules footballer who played with Melbourne in the Victorian Football League (VFL).
