= Les Crawley =

Australian rules footballer

Personal information
- Full name: Leslie Norman Crawley
- Born: 11 March 1927
- Died: 17 July 2018 (aged 91)

Playing career^{1}
Years	Club	Games (Goals)
1948	Melbourne	4 (0)
- ^{1} Playing statistics correct to the end of 1948.

Leslie Norman Crawley (11 March 1927 - 17 July 2018) was an Australian rules footballer who played with Melbourne in the Victorian Football League (VFL).
