= Norm Stephenson =

Australian rules footballer

Personal information
- Full name: Norm Stephenson
- Born: 1 May 1879
- Died: 27 January 1936 (aged 56)

Playing career^{1}
Years	Club	Games (Goals)
1906	Melbourne	1 (0)
- ^{1} Playing statistics correct to the end of 1906.

Norm Stephenson (1 May 1879 – 27 January 1936) was an Australian rules footballer who played with Melbourne in the Victorian Football League (VFL).
