= Neil McMullin =

Australian rules footballer

Personal information
- Full name: Neil McMullin
- Born: 11 January 1954 (age 72)
- Original team: Melbourne Grammar

Playing career^{1}
Years	Club	Games (Goals)
1974	Melbourne	7 (1)
- ^{1} Playing statistics correct to the end of 1974.

Neil McMullin (born 11 January 1954) is a former Australian rules footballer who played with Melbourne in the Victorian Football League (VFL).
