= List of VFL debuts in 1908 =

The 1908 Victorian Football League (VFL) season was the twelfth season of the VFL. The season saw 137 Australian rules footballers make their senior VFL debut and a further 39 players transfer to new clubs having previously played in the VFL.

== Summary ==
Summary of debuts in 1908
Club	VFL debuts	Change of club
Carlton	6	0
Collingwood	12	0
Essendon	13	3
Fitzroy	10	0
Geelong	18	1
Melbourne	12	5
Richmond	21	13
St Kilda	15	1
South Melbourne	14	0
University	16	16
Total	137	39

== Debuts ==
Name	Club	Age at debut	Round debuted	Games	Goals	Notes
Ernie Kelly	Carlton	23 years, 174 days	2	8	11	Brother of Harvey and Otto Kelly.
Andy Pattison	Carlton	22 years, 259 days	13	8	1	
Wally Koochew	Carlton	20 years, 315 days	3	4	2	First Victorian Football League player of Chinese background.
Bill Marchbank	Carlton	20 years, 323 days	12	3	2	Brother of Jim Marchbank.
Bill Laver	Carlton	19 years, 269 days	3	1	0	
Bill Carmody	Carlton	18 years, 317 days	7	1	0	
Les Hughes	Collingwood	24 years, 14 days	1	225	175	
Jim Sadler	Collingwood	21 years, 293 days	5	135	64	
Marshall Herbert	Collingwood	30 years, 273 days	1	51	8	
Bill Heatley	Collingwood	22 years, 50 days	1	50	19	
Artie Freeman	Collingwood	20 years, 235 days	2	27	17	
Richard Daykin	Collingwood	21 years, 207 days	15	21	7	
Alex Dunstan	Collingwood	22 years, 293 days	1	10	2	
Harold Gyton	Collingwood	24 years, 56 days	3	9	1	
Bill Carden	Collingwood	21 years, 344 days	1	5	0	
Tom Holland	Collingwood	22 years, 251 days	4	5	0	Brother of Jack Holland.
Mick Ryan	Collingwood	25 years, 321 days	2	1	0	
Harry Lees	Collingwood	18 years, 60 days	10	1	0	
Paddy Shea	Essendon	22 years, 46 days	1	142	156	Brother of Mark. Previously played for Fitzroy. Also played first-class cricket for Victoria.
Lou Armstrong	Essendon	23 years, 84 days	1	107	109	
Bert Daykin	Essendon	19 years, 359 days	13	32	9	Brother of Percy and Richard Daykin.
Harry Prout	Essendon	21 years, 152 days	GF	29	35	
Les Minto	Essendon	21 years, 296 days	1	25	7	Previously played for Melbourne.
Harry Farnsworth	Essendon	22 years, 179 days	5	24	16	
Bert Ryan	Essendon	27 years, 334 days	1	15	3	
Alan Irwin	Essendon	19 years, 109 days	7	8	2	
Lon Smith	Essendon	21 years, 348 days	4	6	1	
Bill Heaphy	Essendon	19 years, 262 days	18	5	3	
Tommy Crow	Essendon	20 years, 307 days	1	4	0	
Bill French	Essendon	24 years, 68 days	10	3	0	
Tom Sevior	Essendon	20 years, 203 days	3	1	0	
Archie Snell	Essendon	30 years, 312 days	6	1	0	Previously played for Carlton.
Jim Campbell	Essendon	22 years, 89 days	9	1	0	
Fred Anderson	Essendon	22 years, 103 days	10	1	0	
George Holden	Fitzroy	19 years, 17 days	1	165	37	
Billy Dick	Fitzroy	18 years, 291 days	1	53	40	
Bill Dinsmore	Fitzroy	21 years, 155 days	13	19	13	
Val Duncan	Fitzroy	23 years, 364 days	1	11	0	
Bill Franklin	Fitzroy	24 years, 10 days	1	5	4	
Fred Forbes	Fitzroy	25 years, 65 days	13	5	6	
Jim Thorpe	Fitzroy	23 years, 194 days	1	2	0	
Ned Richardson	Fitzroy	22 years, 32 days	10	2	0	
Bill Campbell	Fitzroy	24 years, 295 days	3	1	0	
Tom Norton	Fitzroy	22 years, 156 days	18	1	2	
Les Armstrong	Geelong	21 years, 32 days	13	175	2	
Rupe Brownlees	Geelong	20 years, 6 days	1	100	4	
Charlie Cameron	Geelong	21 years, 343 days	1	46	5	Previously played for South Melbourne.
Alex Boyd	Geelong	24 years, 243 days	11	30	0	
Bert Whittington	Geelong	23 years, 220 days	16	27	3	
Billy Wilton	Geelong	19 years, 144 days	16	20	8	
Percy Salmon	Geelong	22 years, 197 days	11	17	7	
Les Gell	Geelong	21 years, 264 days	1	6	5	
George Tansing	Geelong	24 years, 73 days	6	5	2	
Jack Pender	Geelong	22 years, 253 days	12	4	0	
Johnny Keon	Geelong	22 years, 298 days	14	4	1	
Bill Davern	Geelong	24 years, 294 days	2	3	2	
Norm McGorlick	Geelong	20 years, 219 days	11	3	2	
Les Chisholm	Geelong	20 years, 38 days	16	3	0	
Jack Green	Geelong	20 years, 283 days	6	2	0	
Tom Dickson	Geelong	20 years, 60 days	16	2	0	
Fred James	Geelong	24 years, 98 days	17	2	1	
Robert Ritchie	Geelong	24 years, 206 days	17	2	0	
Bert Bourchier	Geelong	23 years, 291 days	8	1	0	
Len Norman	Melbourne	22 years, 220 days	3	30	15	
Fred Hewitt	Melbourne	24 years, 227 days	10	27	2	Previously played for Carlton.
Alf Jones	Melbourne	22 years, 341 days	1	24	18	
Joe Hodgkins	Melbourne	22 years, 133 days	8	24	23	
Henry Wright	Melbourne	26 years, 75 days	2	18	1	
Bill Tottey	Melbourne	19 years, 209 days	1	14	6	
Jack Donaldson	Melbourne	28 years, 7 days	1	9	3	
Albert Bickford	Melbourne	20 years, 289 days	7	9	0	Brother of Edric Bickford, brother-in-law of Rod McGregor and uncle of George Bickford. Previously played for Carlton.
Joe Bray	Melbourne	21 years, 210 days	4	3	0	
Herb Friend	Melbourne	19 years, 301 days	1	2	0	
George Martin	Melbourne	24 years, 317 days	7	2	2	
Alex Holland	Melbourne	24 years, 13 days	7	1	0	Previously played for Collingwood.
Bill Gillespie	Melbourne	20 years, 361 days	2	1	0	
George McCart	Melbourne	24 years, 320 days	2	1	0	Previously played for Carlton.
Andy Kennedy	Melbourne	24 years, 186 days	5	1	0	Previously played for Carlton.
Jim Bonelli	Melbourne	23 years, 263 days	18	1	0	
Dick Fowler	Melbourne	18 years, 205 days	18	1	0	
Bill Mahoney	Richmond	23 years, 122 days	01	114	53	Previously played for Geelong and St Kilda.
Ted Ohlson	Richmond	21 years, 200 days	1	105	36	
Bob Bowden	Richmond	21 years, 34 days	1	73	9	Previously played for Collingwood.
Billy Schmidt	Richmond	20 years, 125 days	1	75	71	
George Gibson	Richmond	22 years, 328 days	3	70	6	Previously played for Essendon.
Len Incigneri	Richmond	24 years, 120 days	1	62	4	Previously played for South Melbourne.
Tom Heaney	Richmond	20 years, 30 days	1	56	37	
Bill Burns	Richmond	28 years, 119 days	1	53	10	Previously played for Geelong.
Bill Luff	Richmond	22 years, 108 days	1	39	0	Father of Bill Luff Jr.
Bill Bourke	Richmond	25 years, 284 days	1	32	45	
Dick Condon	Richmond	32 years, 44 days	1	32	26	Previously played for Collingwood.
Ivor Lawson	Richmond	25 years, 14 days	3	32	3	Previously played for Collingwood and St Kilda.
Harry Neil	Richmond	25 years, 260 days	5	31	0	Previously played for Collingwood.
Herbert Hill	Richmond	20 years, 156 days	1	24	4	Previously played for Melbourne.
Doug Chapman	Richmond	18 years, 358 days	3	23	5	
Jack Megson	Richmond	25 years, 12 days	1	20	3	Previously played for Essendon.
Jack Hardiman	Richmond	30 years, 280 days	1	15	5	Previously played for Geelong.
Bill Lang	Richmond	25 years, 301 days	1	14	7	Australian heavyweight boxing champion in 1908.
Charlie Pannam	Richmond	33 years, 213 days	1	14	22	Brother of Albert Pannam, father of Alby and Charlie Pannam and grandfather of Lou and Ron Richards. Previously played for Collingwood.
Emmett Ryan	Richmond	22 years, 270 days	1	12	2	Father of Peter Ryan.
Percy Stainer	Richmond	19 years, 232 days	4	7	0	
Stan O'Connell	Richmond	25 years, 17 days	3	5	3	
Ernie McDonald	Richmond	25 years, 97 days	1	4	0	
Percy Speakman	Richmond	22 years, 249 days	12	4	4	
George St John	Richmond	30 years, 116 days	16	4	1	
Charles Williams	Richmond	27 years, 101 days	1	3	0	
Jack Pemberton	Richmond	25 years, 133 days	4	3	0	
Syd Barker	Richmond	20 years, 200 days	8	2	1	Father of Syd Barker Jr.
George Rankine	Richmond	23 years, 243 days	11	2	0	
Fred Larkin	Richmond	20 years, 133 days	15	2	0	
Vin Hannaford	Richmond	23 years, 14 days	2	1	0	
Alex Johnston	Richmond	26 years, 154 days	2	1	0	Previously played for Carlton.
Walter Johnston	Richmond	24 years, 148 days	8	1	0	
Frank Sanguinetti	Richmond	22 years, 102 days	17	1	0	
Bill Woodcock	St Kilda	19 years, 322 days	3	155	48	
Wally Gant	St Kilda	18 years, 60 days	18	49	6	
Bill Madden	St Kilda	26 years, 166 days	1	26	14	
Mick Grace	St Kilda	33 years, 283 days	1	16	26	Brother of Fitzroy footballers Jim and Joe Grace. Previously played for Carlton and Fitzroy.
Alby Landt	St Kilda	19 years, 226 days	1	4	0	
Bismarck Kulpa	St Kilda	21 years, 167 days	1	2	0	
Leo Duff	St Kilda	23 years, 82 days	7	2	1	
Harry Hall	St Kilda	25 years, 228 days	15	2	0	
Bob Northey	St Kilda	26 years, 148 days	16	2	1	
Bert O'Connell	St Kilda	22 years, 343 days	17	2	0	
Joe Prince	St Kilda	22 years, 341 days	18	2	0	
Bob Cromie	St Kilda	26 years, 297 days	06	1	0	
Jack Grant	St Kilda	25 years, 008 days	06	1	0	Previously played for Carlton.
Ernie Abbott	St Kilda	25 years, 20 days	15	1	1	
Doug Hill	St Kilda	24 years, 194 days	16	1	1	
Hector Mitchell	St Kilda	20 years, 355 days	16	1	0	
Arthur Hiskins	South Melbourne	21 years, 236 days	1	185	56	Brother of Fred, Stan and Rupert Hiskins and uncle of Jack Hiskins.
Tom Grimshaw	South Melbourne	18 years, 145 days	1	85	0	
Alf Gough	South Melbourne	20 years, 160 days	1	78	45	
Jack Jones	South Melbourne	20 years, 287 days	1	15	9	
Jack Turnbull	South Melbourne	22 years, 159 days	6	12	0	
Toner Hosking	South Melbourne	17 years, 7 days	3	9	1	
Des Baird	South Melbourne	20 years, 22 days	13	6	0	
Henry Paternoster	South Melbourne	25 years, 306 days	2	2	0	
John Roberts	South Melbourne	27 years, 126 days	8	2	0	
Joe Larkin	South Melbourne	19 years, 315 days	11	2	0	
Reuben Holland	South Melbourne	17 years, 310 days	1	1	1	
Dave Bowen	South Melbourne	22 years, 63 days	3	1	0	
Charles Millsom	South Melbourne	22 years, 315 days	3	1	0	
Tom Clancy	South Melbourne	21 years, 58 days	7	1	0	
Herbert Hurrey	University	20 years, 131 days	6	101	29	
John Gray	University	19 years, 295 days	1	85	3	
George Elliott	University	22 years, 336 days	1	79	3	Previously played for Fitzroy.
Jack West	University	19 years, 089 days	3	71	17	Previously played for Melbourne.
Athol Tymms	University	22 years, 071 days	1	60	29	Previously played for Essendon.
Ted Cordner	University	20 years, 319 days	1	60	8	Father of Ted Jr., Donald, Denis and John Cordner, brother of Harry Cordner, great-grandfather of Harriet Cordner and cousin of Alan and Larry Cordner. Previously played for Melbourne.
Albert Hartkopf	University	18 years, 163 days	7	48	87	Also played Test cricket for Australia.
Edgar Kneen	University	25 years, 236 days	1	46	48	Previously played for Fitzroy.
Norm Richards	University	18 years, 33 days	2	46	5	
Martin Ratz	University	20 years, 201 days	1	42	52	
Jack Jones	University	20 years, 93 days	6	40	3	
Denby Browning	University	23 years, 316 days	1	38	25	
Frank Crawford	University	20 years, 330 days	1	36	0	
Harry Cordner	University	22 years, 320 days	1	29	7	Brother of Ted Cordner, cousin of Alan and "Larry" Cordner, and uncle of Don, Denis, Ted and John Cordner. Previously played for Melbourne.
Alick Ogilvie	University	21 years, 116 days	1	27	20	Previously played for Melbourne.
Chris Fogarty	University	24 years, 95 days	1	26	12	Brother of Tom, John, and Joe Fogarty, and uncle of Tom Fogarty.
Frank Boynton	University	21 years, 122 days	1	25	12	Previously played for Melbourne and Geelong.
Mark Gardner	University	23 years, 283 days	9	21	2	Previously played for Melbourne.
Tom Fogarty	University	35 years, 42 days	1	19	5	Brother of John, Chris and Joe Fogarty, and father of Tom Fogarty. Previously played for St Kilda and South Melbourne.
Leo Seward	University	22 years, 182 days	2	15	15	Brother of Harrie Seward.
Willie Marshall	University	23 years, 298 days	1	11	0	Previously played for Melbourne.
Lance Sleeman	University	23 years, 42 days	1	8	1	Previously played for Melbourne.
Henry Bowden	University	20 years, 88 days	10	8	5	
Mal Williams	University	21 years, 257 days	4	7	0	
Gilbert Barker	University	25 years, 277 days	1	6	2	Previously played for Fitzroy.
Joe Fogarty	University	22 years, 130 days	1	5	1	Brother of Tom, John and Chris, and uncle of Tom Fogarty. Previously played for South Melbourne and Essendon.
John Laing	University	23 years, 339 days	7	2	0	
Arthur Gall	University	22 years, 272 days	10	2	0	
Jim Piper	University	24 years, 128 days	18	2	0	Previously played for Geelong.
Ken Kendall	University	24 years, 57 days	01	1	0	
Ted Fleming	University	22 years, 119 days	04	1	0	Previously played for Melbourne.
Frank Kirby	University	22 years, 321 days	16	1	0	
