= Leo Seward =

Australian rules footballer

Personal information
- Full name: Leo Malachi Seward
- Nickname: Sammy
- Born: 3 November 1885; Rochester, Victoria
- Died: 1 April 1941 (aged 55); Pingelly, Western Australia
- Original team: St Pat's College
- Height: 193 cm (6 ft 4 in)
- Weight: 93 kg (205 lb)

Playing career^{1}
Years	Club	Games (Goals)
1908	University	15 (15)
- ^{1} Playing statistics correct to the end of 1908.

Career highlights
- Victorian interstate representative: 1912; University Vice Captain: 1913

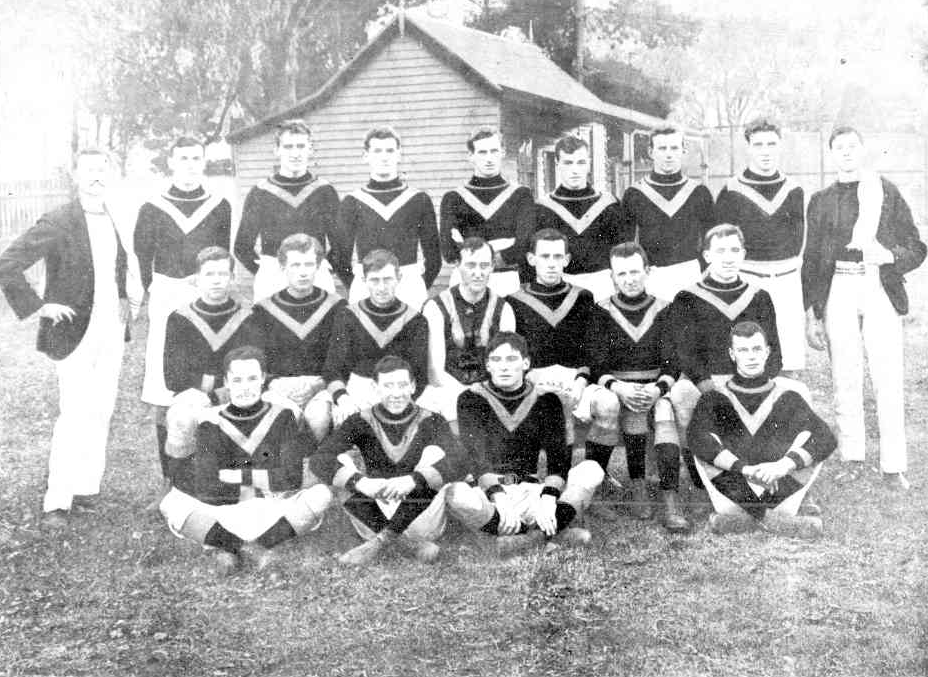
University VFL Team: 23 May 1908 L. Seward, second from left, middle row.

Leo Malachi "Sammy" Seward (3 November 1885 – 1 April 1941) was an all-round athlete, who played Australian rules football with University in the Victorian Football League (VFL) where he was regarded by his fellow players as one of the cleverest followers.

== Family ==
The second of the five children (one of whom died in his infancy) of Stephen Seward (1853–1923), and Mary Ellen Seward (1849–1935), née Kelleher, Leo Malachi Seward (a.k.a. Leo Malachy Seward) was born at Rochester, Victoria on 3 November 1885.

=== Siblings ===
His older brother, Harrie Stephen Seward (1884–1958), was a Member of the Western Australian Legislative Assembly from 1933 to 1950, and a Member of the Australian Senate from 1951 until his death in 1958; his younger brother, Joseph Thomas Lawrence "Tom" Seward (1889–1974), a dental surgeon, served with the First AIF; and his youngest brother, Stephen Aloysius "Steenie" Seward (1892-1982), a farmer, also served with the First AIF.

=== Marriage ===
He married Eveleen Josine McCarthy (1884-1967) — the sister of Dr. Kevin McCarthy, President of the Footscray Football Club from 1926 to 1938 — in Ballarat, on 19 August 1916. They had four children.

== Education ==
He was educated at St Patrick's College, Ballarat, and at the Ballarat School of Mines.

== Football ==
Given the conditions of the admission of the University team to the VFL competition in 1908, and because he had attended the Ballarat School of Mines, Seward was eligible to play for the University side. Whilst playing for the University team, "among his contemporaries, he was regarded as the cleverest follower of his day".

Even though he played for just one season in the VFL, he played for many years in Ballarat and also a season for the Perth Football Club in the West Australian Football League.

Seward, considered to be a magnificent player, bigger than most others, possessing a long kick and a strong mark, was acknowledged to be one of the finest players of his time:

"Seward, a tall University player, was about 6ft. 5in., very strong, and a grand mark and kick. His hitting out from ruck was accurate. It was a pity he did not remain in the game longer." — 'Old St Kildaite', The Sporting Globe, 22 August 1936.
"Seward was the greatest player I have ever seen, ... [he] was simply a football-coach's dream! A giant of 6ft. 4in., it is no exaggeration to say he was a super-Torney, a super-Mueller and a super-Gordon Rattray (of punt kick fame) combined. He followed unchanged for four quarters, hit out unerringly to his clever rover, Martin Ratz, marked like Tom Fitzmaurice, and, like Gordon Rattray, punted goals with no trouble whatsoever from 65 yards out, to the tune of five or six goals in the side's av. 13 goals total." — Dr. James N. Shelton, The Sporting Globe, 17 October 1942.
"The reason [Leo Seward'] name is not so frequently recalled as those of other great players is that he played only one season in the League — 1908 — with University. His team mates included Tom, Chris, and Joe Fogarty, Harry and Ted Cordner, Martin Ratz, Alec (sic) Ogilvie, George Elliott, Lance Sleeman, Mark Gardner, Edgar Kneen, Bert Hartkopf and others.
I regard Seward as without exception the greatest follower and most dominating influence on the field during the last 30 years. This was Seward — 6ft. 4in. to height, 15 stone, magnificently built to proportion. Known by his team mates as "Sammy", he was scrupulously fair, unbeatable in the air, or in the ruck. His opponents literally bounced off him.
His hitting out to his smart rovers, Martin Ratz and Alec Ogilvie, was unerring, and opened up opportunities for fast, open play. On the run, a slow strider, with a stride "from here to the other side of the street", he was much faster than he appeared. When in possession of the ball, a punch, a stab or punt never failed to find a comrade. His punt kicks were rivalled only those of the late Frank Caine. His ruck opponents in that season included such great players as "Mallee" Johnson, Bert Franks, Vic Cumberland, Bill Walker, Bill Busbridge, and he was invincible..." — 'Retrospect', The Sporting Globe, 27 April 1935.

== All-round athlete ==
He was also a fine all-round sportsman.

Apart from his prowess on the football field Leo [Seward] was also outstanding in many other avenues of life. It will be admitted he was one of the fairest footballers ever to play.
At golf and cricket, he excelled. At handball and tennis in his home town (Ballarat) he had few, if any, superiors. As an oarsman and as a swimmer he was again much above the average athlete, and as a pedestrian, notwithstanding his massive frame and height (6ft. 1½ [sic]), he was able to cut out the 100 yards in exceptionally good time. In addition, an occasional break of 100 on the billiard table cost him very little effort.
His life was a model for any young man to emulate. Speaking as one who knew him intimately, and appreciated him in full, his memory will ever be my cherished privilege." — "Roxy, Williamstown", (Letter to the Editor), The Sporting Globe, 21 November 1942.

== Death ==
A mining engineer and then a farmer at Beverley, Western Australia, he died in Western Australia on 1 April 1941, in a motoring accident, aged 55.
