= List of University Football Club leading goalkickers =

The following is a list of University Football Club leading goalkickers in each of their seasons in the Victorian Football League.

+	Player won Leading Goalkicker Medal in same season

Season	Leading Goalkicker	Goals
1908	Martin Ratz	25
1909	Albert Hartkopf	19
1910	Albert Hartkopf (2)	30
1911	Albert Hartkopf (3)	19
1912	Roy Park	22
1913	Roy Park (2)	53
1914	Roy Park (3)	36

Note: Park also won the VFL's Leading Goalkicker Award in 1913 with 53 goals for the home-and-away season, a remarkable effort considering the team itself scored only 115 goals for the year.
