= Tom Fogarty =

Tom Fogarty may refer to:

- Tom Fogarty (hurler) (born 1951), Roman Catholic priest and hurler
- Tom Fogarty (footballer, born 1878) (1878–1922), Australian rules player for University, St Kilda and South Melbourne
- Tom Fogarty (footballer, born 1909) (1909–1984), Australian rules player for St Kilda
- Thomas J. Fogarty, known as Tom, American surgeon and medical device inventor

== See also ==
- Tom Fogerty (1941–1990), American musician best known as the rhythm guitarist for Creedence Clearwater Revival
