= Chris Fogarty =

Australian rules footballer (1884–1915)

Personal information
- Full name: Andrew Christopher Fogarty
- Born: 28 January 1884; North Melbourne, Victoria
- Died: 29 November 1915 (aged 31); Gallipoli, Ottoman Turkey
- Original team: St Pats, Ballarat
- Height: 185 cm (6 ft 1 in)
- Weight: 84 kg (185 lb)
- Position: Follower

Playing career^{1}
Years	Club	Games (Goals)
1906	Essendon	2 (0)
1908–1910	University	26 (12)
Total		28 (12)
- ^{1} Playing statistics correct to the end of 1910.

Andrew Christopher Fogarty (28 January 1884 – 29 November 1915) was an Australian rules footballer who played with Essendon and University in the Victorian Football League (VFL).

He was killed in a shell explosion in Gallipoli.

== Family ==
One of the ten children, six boys and four girls, of the wealthy wine merchant and former Mayor of Hotham (now known as North Melbourne) Thomas Fogarty (1836–1900) and Cecilia Mary Fogarty (1854–1933), née Cullen, Chris Fogarty was born on 28 January 1884 in Hotham, Victoria. He married Mary Agnes O'Connor (sometimes given as Agnes Mary O'Connor) in Hawthorn, on 7 May 1915, the day before he left Australia. Their daughter, Anne Christine Fogarty, was born in London on 5 March 1916.

== Education ==
He was educated at St Patrick's College, Ballarat, Ormond College, and at the University of Melbourne, where he first studied engineering and then transferred to a veterinary science degree.

== Football ==
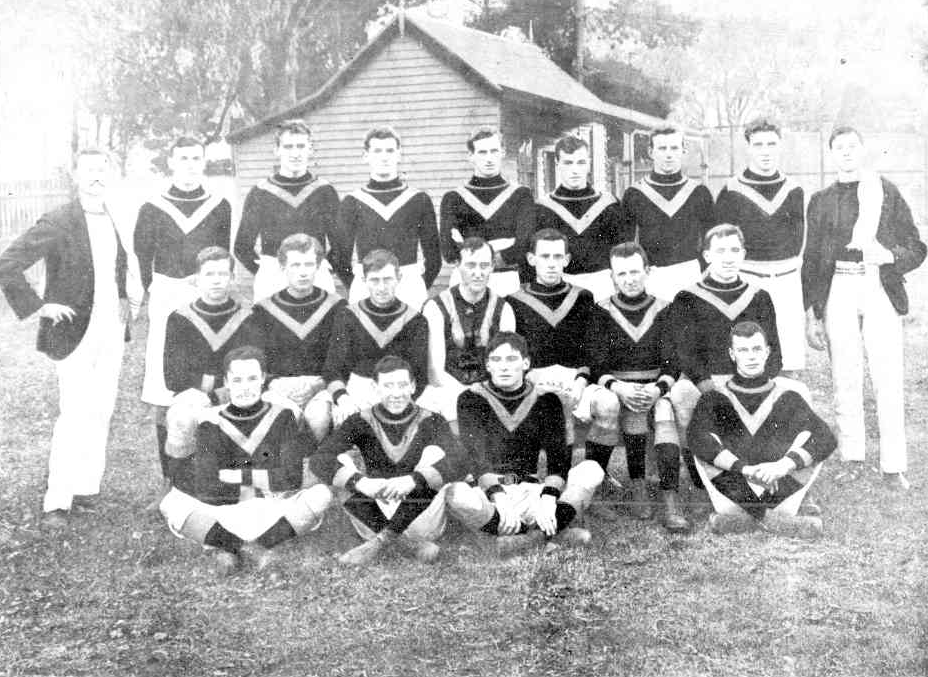
University VFL Team: 23 May 1908: Chris Fogarty, 2nd player from left, back row.

Four of the six Fogarty brothers played VFL football: Thomas Bernard "Tom" Fogarty (1878–1922), played for St Kilda, South Melbourne, and University for a total of 95 games; John Joseph Fogarty (1882–1952), played a single game for South Melbourne; Chris Fogarty, played for Essendon and University for a total of 28 games; and Joseph Patrick "Joe" Fogarty (1887–1954), played with South Melbourne, Essendon, and University for a total of 16 games. His nephew, Thomas Bernard Fogarty (1909–1984), son of his brother Tom, played 13 senior VFL games for St Kilda.

Along with his brother Joe, he played football, representing Ormond College, in a combined Melbourne University team, against a combined University of Adelaide team, on 8 August 1906.

Fogarty played his first senior match for Essendon, against Geelong, at the Corio Oval, on Saturday, 8 September 1906 (which Geelong won by 24 points), and his second march was in the Semi-Final on the following Saturday, against Fitzroy, where he played full-back in an Essendon team that lost by 36 points (his brother Joe also played for Essendon team in each of the matches).

He played football both for Ormond College and Melbourne University during 1907 in the Metropolitan Association, and was awarded a "blue" for football. In late 1907, the VFL agreed to admit the University to its 1908 competition; and, now 24, with his brothers Tom (aged 30) (who captained the team) and Joe (aged 22), Chris Fogarty played in the first competition match that the University VFL team ever played, against Essendon, at the East Melbourne Cricket Ground, on 2 May 1908. He played well in the ruck, although his team lost by 66 points, 14.11 (95) to 3.11 (29).

He played another 25 games for University, playing his last VFL game for University, on the half-back flank, against Collingwood, at the East Melbourne Cricket Ground, on 27 August 1910 (round seventeen). University lost the tight match by 16 points, 9.5 (59) to 10.15 (75).

== Military service ==
His younger brother, Major Joseph Patrick Fogarty (1885–1954), OBE, MC, of the 21st Battalion (Australian Army Medical Corps), served in AIF, in the Middle East and France during World War I. His older brother, Sergeant Thomas Bernard Fogarty (60679), a lawyer, also enlisted (on 17 July 1918).

Chris Fogarty, single, listing his occupation as grazier, enlisted in the First AIF on 26 February 1915. Having received officer training, he was promoted to Lieutenant on 22 April 1915, appointed to the 24th Battalion, AIF, and left Australia on 8 May 1915. He was killed, amongst 31 dead and 100 wounded, by a massive explosion caused by a Turkish shell barrage, on 29 November 1915, at Gallipoli. His brother, Joe, a Medical Officer with the Australian Army Medical Corps, was close at hand and heard the explosion:

Fogarty's brother, Captain (later Major) Joseph Fogarty (a doctor with the Australian Army Medical Corps) also was at Gallipoli at the time and when he heard the carnage caused by this barrage, rushed to the scene and frantically searched for his brother's body.
He found only a left foot and was able to identify it as his brother's because of a large bunion. That foot, all that remained of Chris Fogarty, is buried under the headstone featuring a cross and name. (Main and Allen, 2002, p. 65)

A brother-in-law, John Maurice Orr Colahan (1894–1917), son of Surgeon-Major-General John Colahan, M.D., was killed in action on 14 October 1917.

== Remembered ==
He is buried at the Lone Pine Cemetery, Gallipoli, Turkey; and his name is located at panel 101 in the Commemorative Area at the Australian War Memorial.

His parents installed a stained glass window in his memory at the Roman Catholic church, St Mary Star of the Sea, at West Melbourne.

== See also ==
- List of Victorian Football League players who died on active service
- List of Australian rules football families

== Sources ==
- Holmesby, Russell & Main, Jim (2007). The Encyclopedia of AFL Footballers. 7th ed. Melbourne: Bas Publishing.
- Main, J. & Allen, D., "Fogarty, Chris", pp. 65–67 in Main, J. & Allen, D., Fallen – The Ultimate Heroes: Footballers Who Never Returned From War, Crown Content, (Melbourne), 2002.
- Died on Service: Fogarty, The Argus, (Wednesday, 15 December 1915), p.1.
- Australian Casualties: 125th List Issued: Killed in Action: Victoria (Lieut. Fogarty, A. C., 24th Batt., Kew), The Argus, (Tuesday, 21 December 1915), p.8.
