= Bill Carmody (disambiguation) =

Bill Carmody (born 1951) is a retired American men's college basketball coach

Bill Carmody may also refer to:

- Bill Carmody (footballer, born 1889) (died 1953), Australian rules footballer who played for the Carlton Football Club
- Bill Carmody (footballer, born 1922) (died 2001), Australian rules footballer who played for the St Kilda Football Club
- Bill Carmody (priest) (1957–2016), Roman Catholic priest
- Bill Carmody (lawyer), American trial lawyer
