= Joe Fogarty =

Australian rules footballer (1885–1954)

Personal information
- Full name: Joseph Patrick Fogarty
- Born: 24 December 1885; Hotham, Victoria
- Died: 28 June 1954 (aged 68); Armadale, Victoria
- Original team: South Yarra Amateur FC (MJFA)

Playing career^{1}
Years	Club	Games (Goals)
1905	South Melbourne	9 (5)
1906	Essendon	2 (3)
1908	University	5 (1)
Total		16 (9)
- ^{1} Playing statistics correct to the end of 1908.

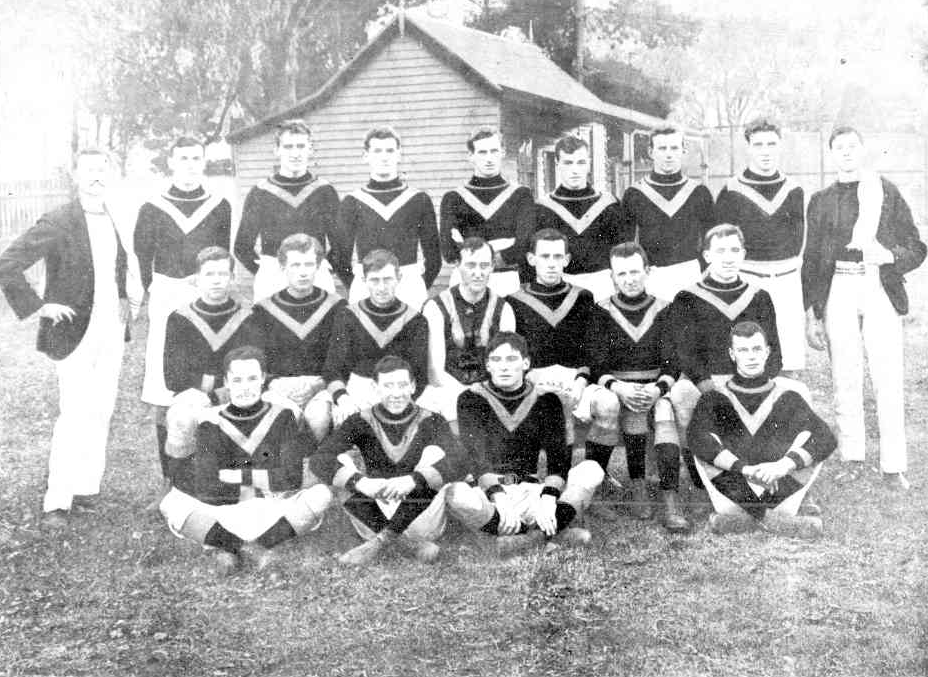
University VFL Team: 23 May 1908: A. C. Fogarty, player at extreme right, back row.

Joseph Patrick Fogarty (24 December 1885 – 28 June 1954), MC, OBE, M.B.B.S. (Melbourne), is a former Australian rules footballer who played with South Melbourne, Essendon and University in the Victorian Football League (VFL). He is one of four Fogarty brothers that played senior VFL football. He also served in the Australian Army Medical Corps in World War I, eventually attaining the rank of Major.

== Family ==
One of the twelve children of the wealthy wine merchant and former Mayor of Hotham (now known as "North Melbourne") Thomas Fogarty (1836–1900), and Cecilia Mary Fogarty (1854–1933), née Cullen, Joe Fogarty was born on 24 December 1885 in Hotham, Victoria.

He married Gladys Willshear (1890–1979), at Brompton Oratory, in England, on 24 December 1916; they had no children.

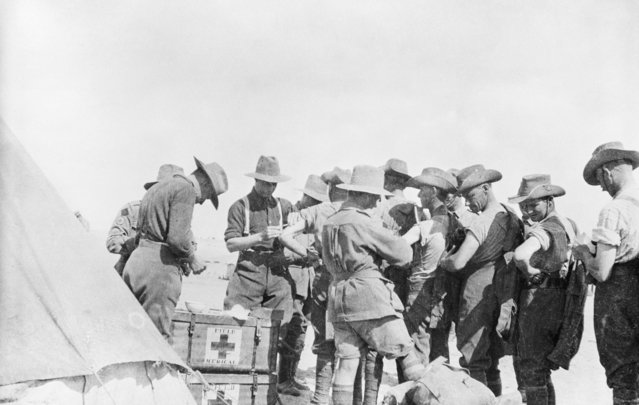
Medical Officer Captain J.P. Fogarty (centre) vaccinating Australian soldiers against cholera, in Egypt, August 1915, prior to them leaving for Gallipoli.

== Education ==
Educated at Christian Brothers' College (Parade), East Melbourne, and then at St Patrick's College, Ballarat as a boarder (he was dux of the College in 1901).

He was admitted to Ormond College in 1903. He studied medicine at the University of Melbourne, and graduated as Bachelor of Medicine and Bachelor of Surgery (M.B.B.S.) on 10 June 1912.

During his time at the university he was awarded a full blue in football and in rowing (in 1906).

== Footballer ==
Including Joe, four of the six Fogarty brothers played VFL football: Thomas Bernard "Tom" Fogarty (1878–1922), played for St Kilda, South Melbourne, and University for a total of 95 games, John Joseph Fogarty (1882–1952), played a single game for South Melbourne in 1902, and Andrew Christopher "Chris" Fogarty (1884–1915), played for Essendon and University for a total of 28 games.

Joe's nephew, Thomas Bernard Fogarty (1909–1984), son of his brother Tom, played 13 senior VFL games for St Kilda.

=== University of Melbourne (inter-collegial and inter-varsity) ===
During his time at Melbourne University, he also played for Ormond College in inter-collegial matches, and for the University of Melbourne in its annual matches against the University of Adelaide.

=== South Melbourne (VFL) ===
Recruited from the South Yarra Amateur Football Club in the Metropolitan Junior Football Association (MJFA), he played his first VFL match for South Melbourne, on the half-forward flank, alongside his brother, Tom, in the ruck, against Geelong, at the Lake Oval, on 1 July 1905: .

=== Essendon (VFL) ===
Both Joe and his brother Chris played their only two VFL matches for Essendon, against Geelong, at the Corio Oval, on 8 September 1906, and against Fitzroy at the MCG, on 15 September 1906.

=== University (VFL) ===
Granted a clearance from Essendon on 29 April 1908, he played in the 1908 season's first five games for the University of Melbourne's VFL team. His last VFL match was against South Melbourne, at the Lake Oval, on 30 May 1908. He was unable to continue due to a knee injury.

== Military service ==
Enlisting in the Australian Army Medical Corps on 26 March 1915, Fogarty served in the Middle East and France with the 21st Battalion during World War I. On his way to the Dardanelles, his transport ship, the Southport, was torpedoed.

He was appointed Captain on his enlistment, and was promoted to Major on 27 April 1917. He was awarded the Military Cross for bravery at Pozières in July 1916, and was made an officer of the Order of the British Empire for valuable special services during the war in December 1919.

== Medical practitioner ==
He was registered as a Medical Practitioner in Victoria on 13 June 1912 (Reg. no.2872); and, having returned from military service, he conducted his medical practice from 114 Barkers Road, Hawthorn, Victoria. He retired from his general practice in 1949 and became a specialist, practising from 61 Collins Street.

== Death ==
He died at a privare hospital Armadale, Victoria on 28 June 1954.

== See also ==
- List of Australian rules football families
