= Norm Richards =

Australian rules footballer

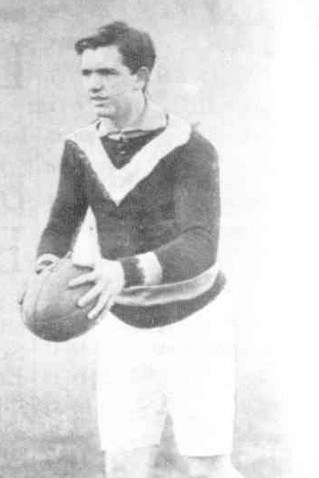
- Richards in 1910

Personal information
- Full name: Norman Roy Richards
- Born: 6 April 1890; Mooroopna
- Died: 26 July 1952 (aged 62); Ballarat
- Original team: Scotch College

Playing career^{1}
Years	Club	Games (Goals)
1908–1910	University	46 (5)
- ^{1} Playing statistics correct to the end of 1910.

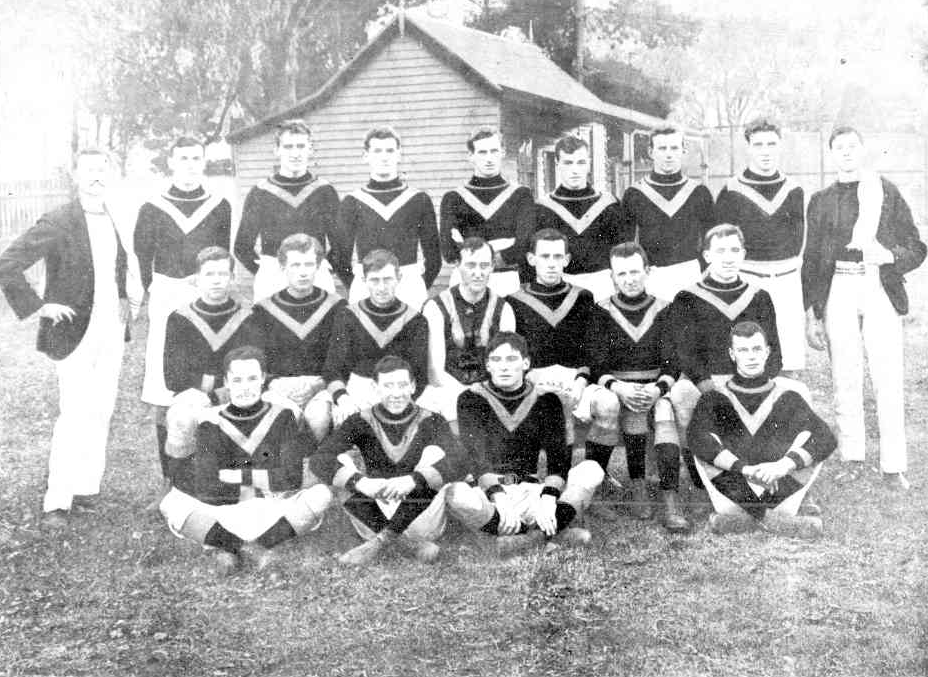
University VFL Team: 23 May 1908: N. Richards, player at extreme left, middle row.

Norman Roy Richards (6 April 1890 – 26 July 1952) was an Australian rules footballer who played with University in the Victorian Football League (VFL).
