= Ted Fleming =

Australian rules footballer

Personal information
- Full name: Edmond Aloysius Fleming
- Born: 25 January 1886; Echuca
- Died: 17 May 1909 (aged 23); Carlton, Victoria
- Original team: Trinity College / Xavier College

Playing career^{1}
Years	Club	Games (Goals)
1905	Melbourne	1 (0)
1908	University	1 (0)
Total		2 (0)
- ^{1} Playing statistics correct to the end of 1908.

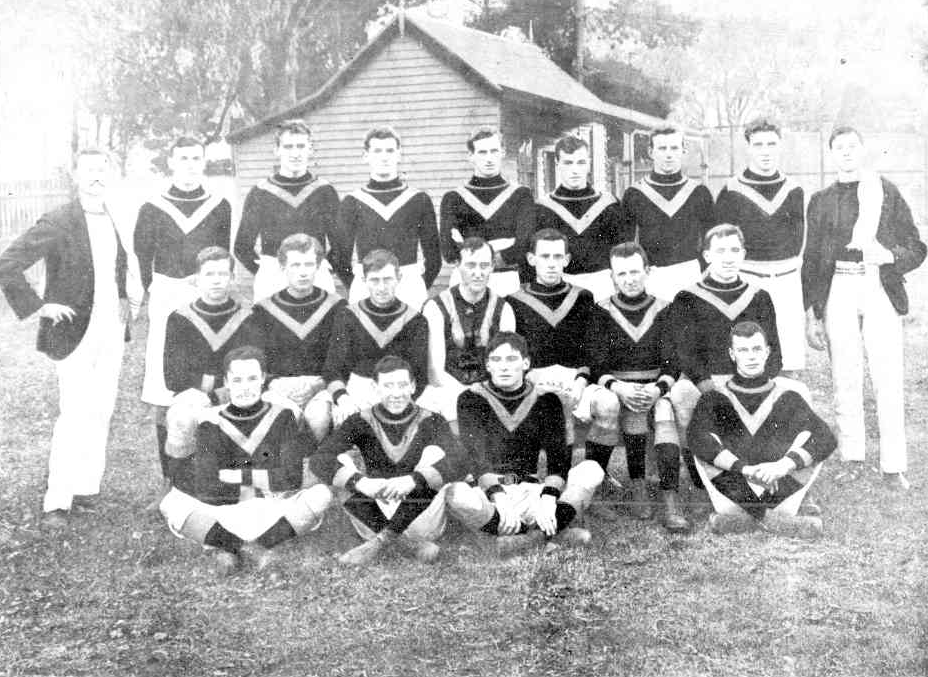
University VFL Team: 23 May 1908: E. Fleming, second from right, middle row.

Edmond Aloysius "Ted" Fleming (25 January 1886 – 17 May 1909) was an Australian rules footballer who played with Melbourne and University in the Victorian Football League (VFL).

== Death ==
Fleming died on 17 May 1909, aged 23, after he had suffered a ruptured blood vessel in his stomach.
