= Frank Crawford (Australian rules footballer) =

Australian rules footballer

Personal information
- Full name: Francis Bartlett Crawford
- Born: 7 June 1887; St Kilda, Victoria
- Died: 3 July 1943 (aged 56); Richmond, Victoria
- Original team: Geelong College

Playing career^{1}
Years	Club	Games (Goals)
1908–11	University	36 (0)
- ^{1} Playing statistics correct to the end of 1911.

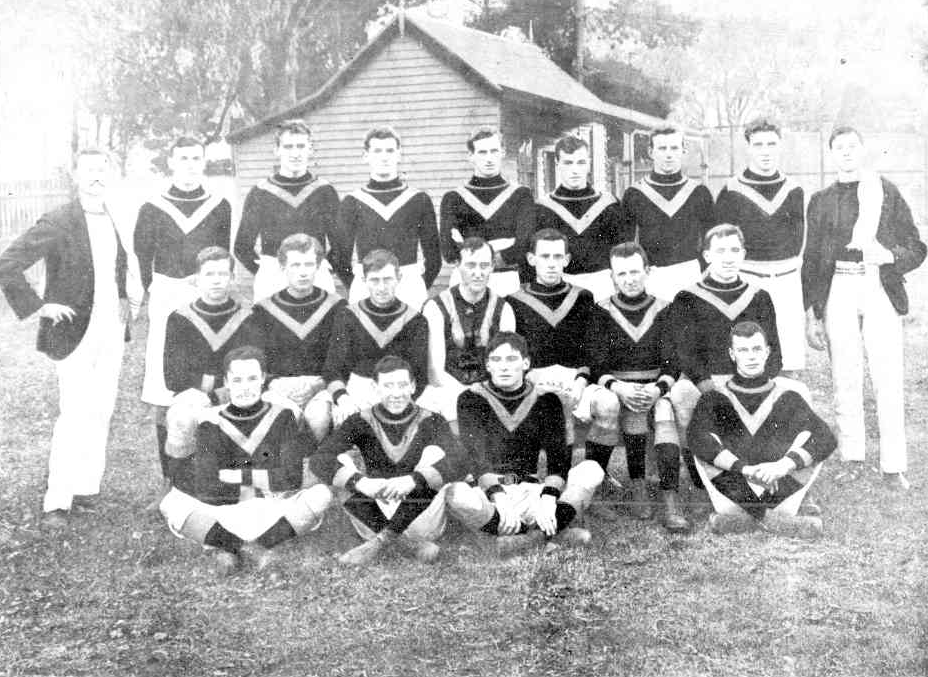
University VFL Team: 23 May 1908: F. R. Crawford, player at extreme left, back row.

Francis Bartlett Crawford (7 June 1887 – 3 July 1943) was an Australian rules footballer who played with University in the Victorian Football League (VFL).

== Education ==
He was educated at Geelong College.

== Football ==
He played VFL football while he studied medicine at the University of Melbourne.

== Medical practitioner ==
Following his graduation, he worked in Launceston and Ballarat before taking over a practice in Erin St, Richmond.
