= Alex Boyd =

Alex Boyd and similar names may refer to:

- Alex Boyd (photographer) (born 1984), Scottish artist & photographer
- Alex Boyd (author) (born 1969), Canadian poet, essayist, editor, and critic
- Alex Boyd (footballer) (1883–1962), Australian rules footballer

== Alexander ==
- Alexander Boyd (1764–1857), U.S. Representative from New York
- Alexander Boyd, 3rd Lord Boyd (died after 1508), Scottish noble
- Alexander Boyd (county solicitor) (1834–1870), murdered by a lynching party of Ku Klux Klan members
- Alexander Boyd Baird (1891–1967), Canadian businessman and Senator

== Alexandra ==
- Alexandra Boyd, British actress
