= John Gray (Australian footballer) =

Australian rules footballer

Personal information
- Full name: John Gray
- Born: 12 July 1888; Irvine, Scotland
- Died: 28 June 1947 (aged 58); Toorak, Victoria
- Original team: Scotch College

Playing career^{1}
Years	Club	Games (Goals)
1908–1913	University	85 (3)
- ^{1} Playing statistics correct to the end of 1913.

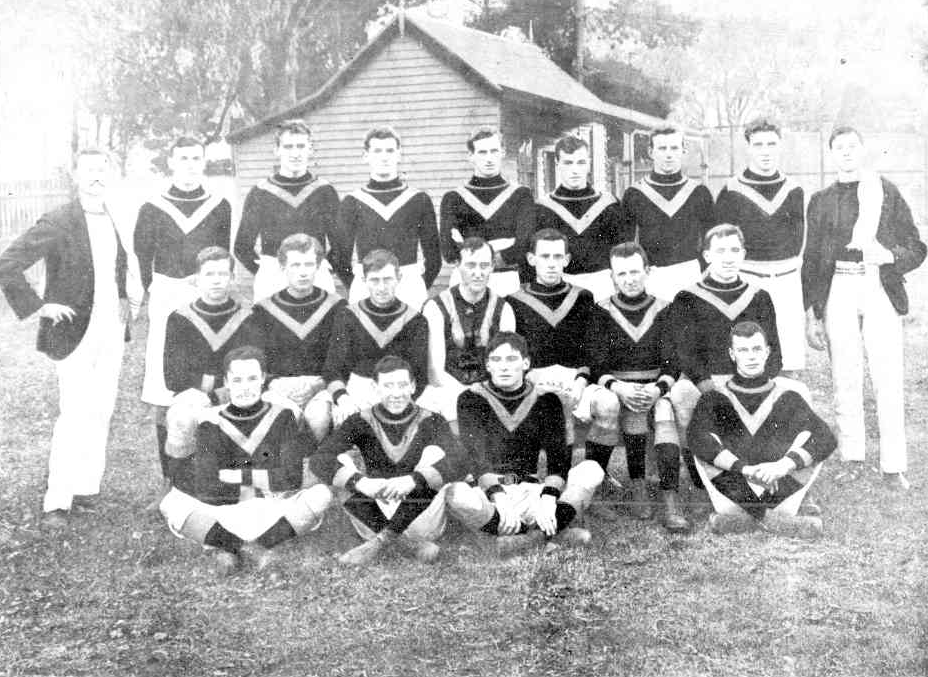
University VFL Team: 23 May 1908: J. Gray, fourth from left, front row.

John G Gray (12 July 1888 – 28 June 1947) was an Australian rules footballer who played with University in the Victorian Football League (VFL).

== Football ==
A defender for University, his relatively long career at the club ended after the 1913 season.

== Medicine ==
Upon completion of his medical degree, Gray moved to Corowa, New South Wales in 1914, after purchasing a practice from H D McKenzie. He would later serve in both World Wars.

He was appointed the Border United Football Club's Honorary Medical Officer for the 1919 Ovens and Murray Football League season and continued in this role for a number of years.

Gray settled in Corowa and conducted a general practice there for a number of years before returning to Melbourne, Victoria in 1924.

== Death ==
He died in June 1947 whilst driving to see a patient in Toorak.
