= Denby Browning =

Australian rules footballer

Personal information
- Full name: Denby De Courcey Browning
- Born: 21 June 1884; Carlton, Victoria
- Died: 20 December 1942 (aged 58); Burwood, New South Wales
- Original team: Carlton College
- Position: Centre

Playing career^{1}
Years	Club	Games (Goals)
1908–10	University	38 (25)
- ^{1} Playing statistics correct to the end of 1910.

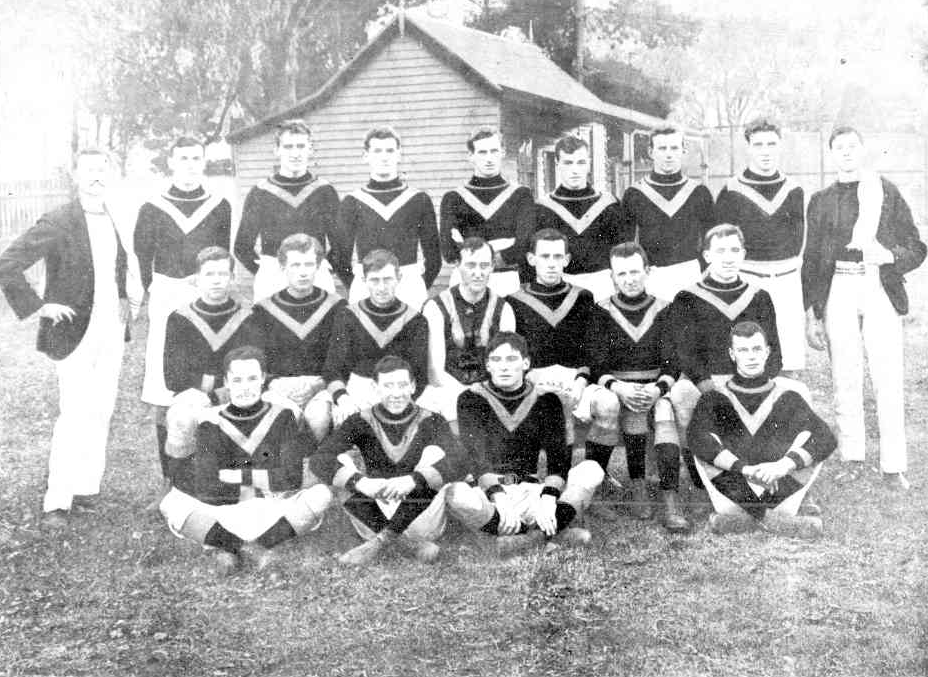
University VFL Team: 23 May 1908: D. Browning, third from left, back row.

Denby De Courcey Browning (21 June 1884 – 20 December 1942) was an Australian rules footballer who played with University in the Victorian Football League (VFL).

== Biography ==
Browning was born in Carlton, Victoria and attended Carlton College, where he was Dux of Upper IV in 1899, before his acceptance to the University of Melbourne's medical school. With the university's football club entering the VFL in 1908, Browning was selected in University's inaugural side, against Essendon at East Melbourne Cricket Ground on 2 May 1908.

Browning was a regular member of university's side in the 1908 and 1909 seasons but only played four matches in 1910, finishing his VFL career with 38 games and 25 goals.

Browning graduated in 1911 and moved to Ardrossan, South Australia in 1912 to practice medicine.

Following the outbreak of World War I, Browning enlisted with the Australian Army Medical Corps on 26 March 1915, gaining the rank of Major and serving with the 4th Light Horse Brigade Field Ambulance. Invalided, Browning returned to Australia on 27 July 1917 and was discharged on 9 October 2017.

Browning was a Protestant.

Browning's wife Elizabeth, of Burwood, New South Wales, predeceased him, on 5 April 1936.

Browning died on 20 December 1942 at 27 Belmore St, Burwood, survived by his second wife Constance, son Thomas and daughter Elizabeth.

== Sources ==
- Holmesby, Russell & Main, Jim (2007) The Encyclopedia of AFL Footballers 7th ed. Melbourne: Bas Publishing.
