= Bert O'Connell =

Australian rules footballer (1885–1917)

Personal information
- Full name: Herbert Dean O'Connell
- Born: 7 September 1885; Windsor, Victoria
- Died: 17 October 1917 (aged 32); Broodseinde, Passchendaele salient, Belgium

Playing career^{1}
Years	Club	Games (Goals)
1908	St Kilda	2 (0)
1909	Footscray (VFA)	16 (6)
- ^{1} Playing statistics correct to the end of 1908.

Herbert Dean O'Connell (7 September 1885 – 17 October 1917) was an Australian rules footballer who played for the St Kilda Football Club in the Victorian Football League (VFL). He died of wounds sustained in action as a member of the First AIF, in World War I.

== Family ==
The son of Walter James O'Connell, and Annie Jane O'Connell (1857–1899), née Kemp, Herbert Dean O'Connell was born at Windsor, Victoria on 7 September 1885.

He married Ruby Evelyn Henderson (1890–?) on 17 June 1916 at All Saints Anglican Church, East St Kilda.

== Football ==
Recruited from the South Yarra Amateur Football Club in the Metropolitan Junior Football Association (MJFA), he made his VFL debut, on the wing, with the St Kilda First XVIII in the round 17 match against Fitzroy, at the Junction Oval, 15 August 1908.

His second, and final match for St Kilda was in the round 18 match against Richmond, the final home-and-away game of the 1908 season, held on 5 September 1908 (the competition had been suspended for two weeks to accommodate the 1908 Melbourne Carnival).

The following season O'Connell played with Footscray in the Victorian Football Association.

== Military service ==
Employed as an etcher, O'Connell enlisted in the First AIF on 14 February 1916, and he embarked for Europe on 1 August 1916 after completing basic training.

After serving in England as a bayonet instructor in early 1917, O'Connell was transferred to the 60th Battalion on 8 October 1917.

== Death ==
On 17 October 1917, having been fatally wounded by a shell in the front line trenches at Broodseinde Ridge, east of Ypres, he died of his wounds.

== Burial ==
A letter, written to O'Connell's wife, Ruby, dated 5 September 1921, informed her that there was now "little doubt" that the individual interred as a (previously unidentified) corporal was "identical with" O'Connell, and that, as a consequence, "the Imperial War Graves Commission have decided to erect over the grave [of the previously unidentified corporal] a provisional cross marked "Believed to be 2236, Cpl.H.D.O'Donnell, 60th Battalion, A.I.F."."

== See also ==
- List of Victorian Football League players who died on active service
