= Jack West =

Australian rules footballer

Personal information
- Full name: John Melville West
- Born: 17 February 1889; Mooroopna, Victoria
- Died: 26 March 1960 (aged 71); South Yarra, Victoria
- Original team: South Melbourne College

Playing career^{1}
Years	Club	Games (Goals)
1906–07	Melbourne	4 (0)
1908–14	University	71 (17)
Total		75 (17)
- ^{1} Playing statistics correct to the end of 1910.

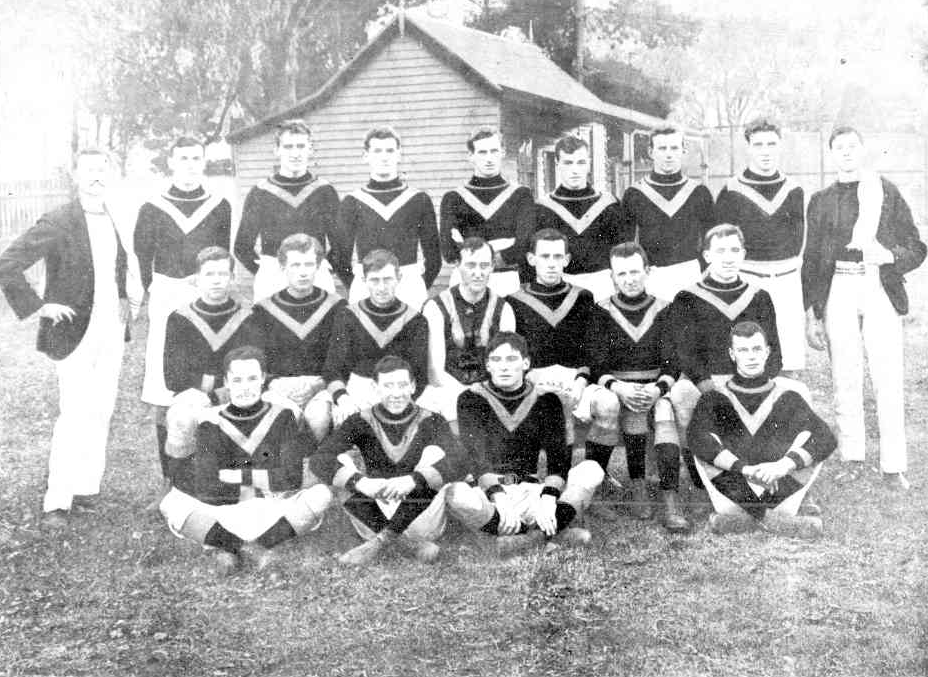
University VFL Team: 23 May 1908: A.J. West, third player from right, back row.

John Melville West (17 February 1889 – 26 March 1960) was an Australian rules footballer who played with Melbourne and University in the Victorian Football League (VFL).

== Military service ==
He was both a footballer and a resident master at Melbourne Grammar School when he enlisted in the AIF, 7th Battalion, C Company, on 17 August 1914, only two weeks after war was declared.

On 25 April 1915 he landed at Gallipoli and four days later was appointed second lieutenant. In August he was promoted to lieutenant, just a week before he was wounded in action with significant gunshot wounds to the head and hand. A few days later he was admitted to the 1st Australian General Hospital, Cairo, Egypt, and he subsequently returned to Australia in May 1916 as he was no longer fit for active duties. From 1919 until 1947 he was employed by Munitions Supply Department.

== Death ==
West died in South Yarra on 26 March 1960, aged 71.
