= Lance Sleeman =

Australian rules footballer and doctor

Personal information
- Full name: Lancelot Osbert Sleeman
- Born: 21 March 1885; Tylden, Victoria
- Died: 20 December 1968 (aged 83); Hawthorn, Victoria
- Original team: Scotch College

Playing career^{1}
Years	Club	Games (Goals)
1906	Melbourne	1 (0)
1908	University	8 (1)
Total		9 (1)
- ^{1} Playing statistics correct to the end of 1908.

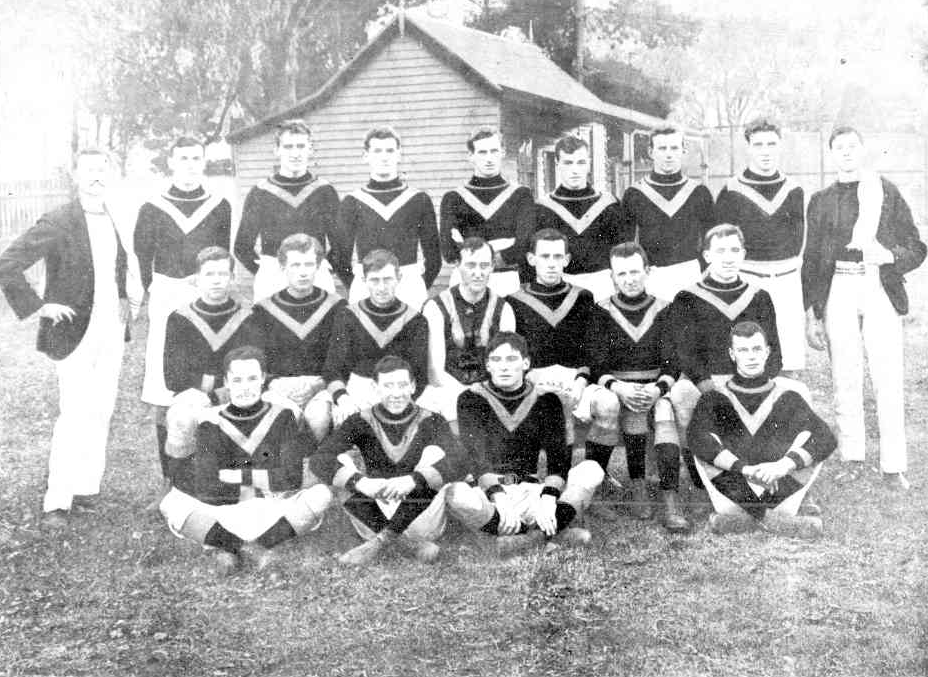
University VFL Team: 23 May 1908: L.O. Sleeman, extreme left, front row.

Dr. Lancelot Osbert "Lance" Sleeman (21 March 1885 – 20 December 1968) was an Australian rules footballer who played with Melbourne and University in the Victorian Football League (VFL).

== Family ==
Originally from Wonthaggi,

== Education ==
Sleeman was educated at Scotch College, but he never played school football for Scotch. After further education at Melbourne University where he studied medicine, Sleeman became a general practitioner.
