= Tom Fogarty (footballer, born 1878) =

Australian rules footballer (1878–1922)

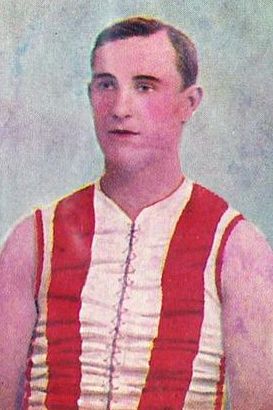
- Cigarette card of Fogarty in 1905

Personal information
- Full name: Thomas Bernard Fogarty
- Born: 21 March 1878; Hotham, Victoria
- Died: 23 February 1922 (aged 43); St Kilda, Victoria
- Position: Ruck

Playing career^{1}
Years	Club	Games (Goals)
1898	St Kilda	10 (0)
1902–06	South Melbourne	66 (20)
1908–09	University	19 (5)
Total		95 (25)
- ^{1} Playing statistics correct to the end of 1909.

Career highlights
- South Melbourne captain, 1903; University captain, 1908

Thomas Bernard Fogarty (21 March 1878 – 23 February 1922) was an Australian rules footballer who played with St Kilda, South Melbourne and University in the Victorian Football League (VFL).

== Football ==
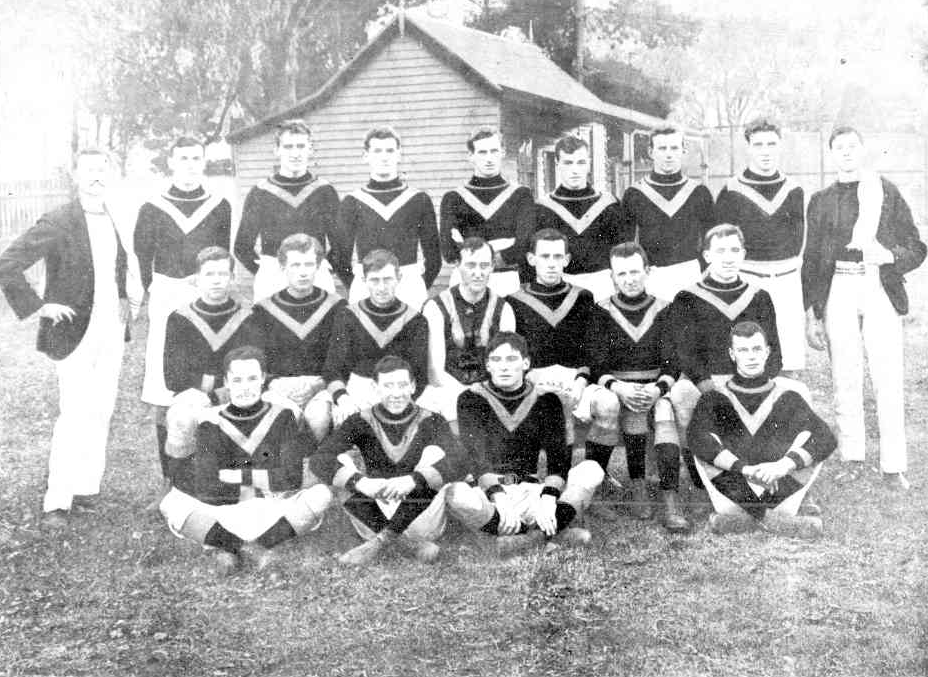
University VFL Team: 23 May 1908: T.B. Fogarty, fourth from left, middle row.

After retiring in 1906 because of business pressures, Essendon did their best to convince him to join their team, but he did not accept. Captaining South Melbourne in 1903, he also captained University for a short period of time in 1908 upon his return from retirement.

== Family ==
One of the ten children, six boys and four girls, of the wealthy wine merchant and former Mayor of Hotham (now known as "North Melbourne"), Thomas Fogarty (1836–1900) and Cecilia Mary Fogarty (1854–1933), née Cullen, Tom Fogarty was born on 21 March 1878 in Hotham, Victoria. He married Rose Elinor Starr in 1907. Their son, Thomas Bernard Fogarty (1909–1984), played 13 senior VFL games for St Kilda.

Four of the six Fogarty brothers played VFL football. In addition to Tom, John Joseph Fogarty (1882–1952), played a single game for South Melbourne, Andrew Christopher "Chris" Fogarty (1884–1915), played for Essendon and University for a total of 28 games, and Joseph Patrick "Joe" Fogarty (1887–1954), played with South Melbourne, Essendon, and University for a total of 16 games.

== Soldier ==
Sergeant Thomas Bernard Fogarty (60679), a lawyer, enlisted in the First AIF on 17 July 1918.

== Death ==
In February 1922, Fogarty was found dead, floating in Port Phillip, near the St Kilda Pier. His hat and coat had been found under the pier the previous day. He had been suspended from practising law the previous December for misconduct.

== See also ==
- List of Australian rules football families

== Sources ==
- Holmesby, Russell & Main, Jim (2007). The Encyclopedia of AFL Footballers. 7th ed. Melbourne: Bas Publishing.
- Main, J. & Allen, D., "Fogarty, Chris", pp. 65–67 in Main, J. & Allen, D., Fallen – The Ultimate Heroes: Footballers Who Never Returned From War, Crown Content, (Melbourne), 2002.
- South Melbourne Team, Melbourne Punch, (Thursday, 4 June 1903), p.16.
