= Doug Chapman (Australian footballer) =

Australian rules footballer

Personal information
- Full name: Walter Douglas Chapman
- Born: 24 May 1889; Dromana, Victoria
- Died: 18 November 1975 (aged 86); Box Hill, Victoria
- Original team: Dromana
- Height: 191 cm (6 ft 3 in)
- Weight: 85 kg (187 lb)

Playing career^{1}
Years	Club	Games (Goals)
1908–09	Richmond	23 (5)
1913	Melbourne	10 (7)
Total		33 (12)
- ^{1} Playing statistics correct to the end of 1913.

Walter Douglas Chapman (1889-1975) was an Australian rules footballer who played with Richmond and Melbourne in the Victorian Football League (VFL).

Born in Dromana to Henry George Chapman and Isabella Gibson, Doug Chapman joined Richmond from Dromana at the start of the 1908 VFL season. In 1910, he transferred to Essendon Association Football Club in the Victorian Football Association (VFA), and he was a member of their premiership winning team in 1912. He returned to the VFL when he joined Melbourne, where he made ten senior appearances during the 1913 VFL season. In 1914, he joined Hawthorn in their first year of senior football in the VFA, and he played until 1919, making 29 appearances in total for the club.

In 1917, he married Eveline Vere Innes, and they lived in the eastern suburbs of Melbourne until his death in 1975.
