= Walter Johnston (footballer) =

Australian rules footballer

Personal information
- Full name: Walter Johnston
- Born: 17 January 1884; Kingston
- Died: 18 July 1946 (aged 62); Ringwood

Playing career^{1}
| Years | Club | Games (Goals) |
| 1908 | Richmond | 1 (0) |
| Total | | 1 (0) |
- ^{1} Playing statistics correct to the end of 1908.

Walter Johnston (17 January 1884 – 18 July 1946) was an Australian rules footballer who played one game for the Richmond Football Club in the Victorian Football League (VFL) in 1908.

Until 2018, this game had been incorrectly allocated to Alex Johnston.

Johnston served in the Australian army during World War II, despite being 56 years old by falsifying his birth day to 1 January 1896.
