= Frank Sanguinetti =

Australian rules footballer

Personal information
- Full name: Frank Sanguinetti
- Born: 5 May 1886; Collingwood, Victoria
- Died: 27 July 1973 (aged 87); Camberwell, Victoria
- Original team: Collingwood Districts

Playing career^{1}
Years	Club	Games (Goals)
1908	Richmond	1 (0)
- ^{1} Playing statistics correct to the end of 1908.

Frank Sanguinetti (5 May 1886 – 27 July 1973) was an Australian rules footballer who played with Richmond in the Victorian Football League (VFL).

== Family ==
The son of tailor John Francis Sanguinetti (1862-1917), and dressmaker Emily Purthynia Sanguinetti (1862-1902), née Williams, Frank Sanguinetti was born at Collingwood, Victoria on 5 May 1886.

He married Edith Jane Allen (1890-1972) in 1912. They had six children.

== Football ==
After a single senior game with Richmond against Carlton at the Punt Road Oval on 15 August 1908, the second last match of Richmond's first VFL season, Sanguinetti returned to Collingwood Districts in 1909 where he played until 1913.

== Death ==
Having spent his life employed as a tailor, he died at Camberwell, Victoria on 27 July 1973.
