= Hector Mitchell (footballer) =

Australian rules footballer

Personal information
- Full name: Hector Matheson Mitchell
- Born: 19 August 1887; Warrnambool, Victoria
- Died: 16 June 1917 (aged 29); Singapore
- Original team: Warrnambool

Playing career^{1}
Years	Club	Games (Goals)
1908	St Kilda	1 (0)
- ^{1} Playing statistics correct to the end of 1908.

Stoker Hector Matheson Mitchell (19 August 1887 – 16 June 1917) was an Australian rules footballer who played with St Kilda in the Victorian Football League (VFL).

Mitchell, the second son of Andrew and Grace Mitchell, was born in Warrnambool.

He was with St Kilda during the 1908 VFL season and played one senior game, in round 16, as one of three debutants in a 19-point loss to Collingwood at Victoria Park.

His football career was put on hold aged 21 when he enlisted in the Royal Navy, on 4 November 1908. Mitchell, a stoker, was a member of the crew on board HMS Psyche initially, then went to England on HMS Challenger. In England he was posted to HMAS Melbourne, the first cruiser launched for the Royal Australian Navy.

Once he returned to Australia, with his five-year term of service completed, Mitchell went to work at the Newport Workshops, where he remained for two years. Around this time he played football for Port Melbourne in the Victorian Football Association (VFA).

Mitchell re-enlisted in August 1916 and served on HMAS Cerberus, before he was transferred to HMAS Swan.

On board HMAS Swan, which was in operation with British blockade forces in the Far East, Mitchell began suffering from an illness, described in one source as "brain fever". He was sent to a hospital in Singapore, where he died from the illness on 16 June 1917, aged 29. Buried with full naval honors, he now rests at Singapore's Kranji War Cemetery.
