= Tom Grimshaw =

Australian rules footballer

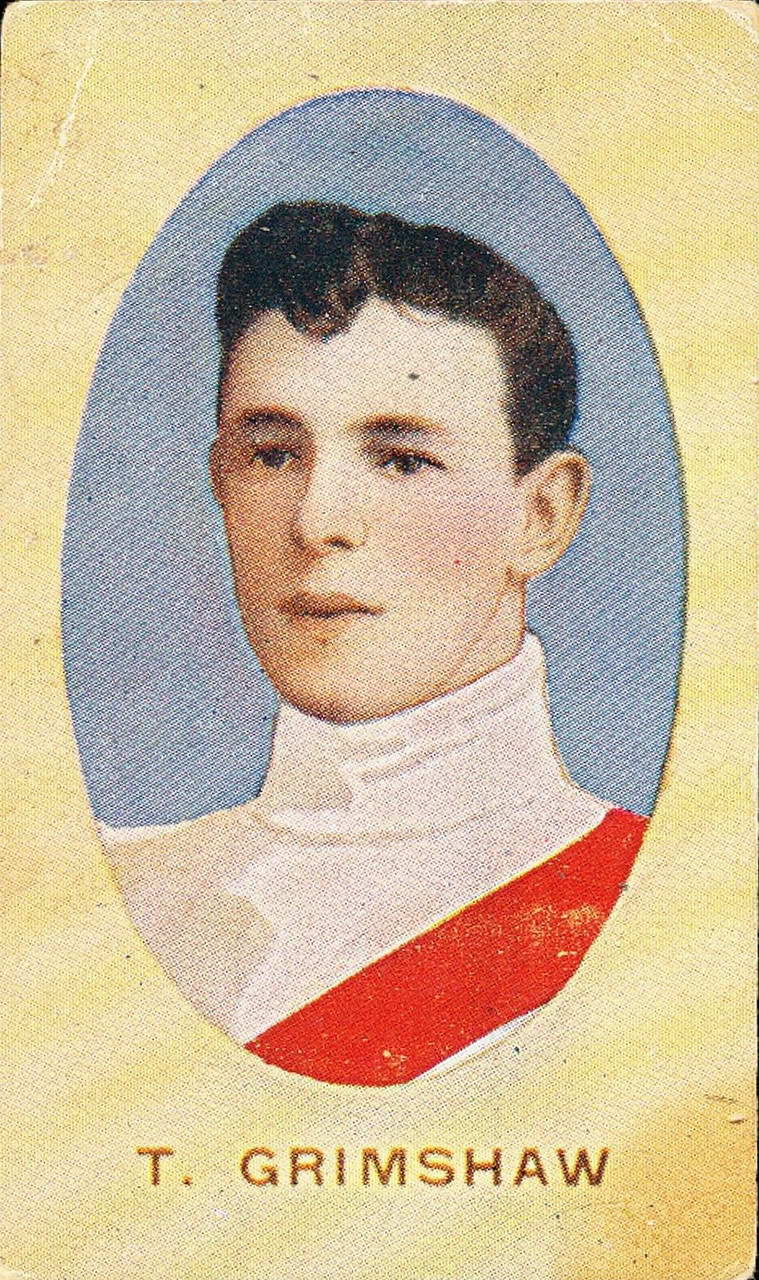
- Cigarette card of Grimshaw in 1910

Personal information
- Full name: Thomas Stewart Grimshaw
- Born: 9 December 1889; Williamstown, Victoria
- Died: 10 August 1958 (aged 68); Parkville, Victoria
- Original team: Footscray juniors
- Height: 179 cm (5 ft 10 in)
- Weight: 70 kg (154 lb)
- Position: Half-back flank

Playing career^{1}
Years	Club	Games (Goals)
1908–1912	South Melbourne	85 (0)
1913–1914	Footscray (VFA)	37 (0)
- ^{1} Playing statistics correct to the end of 1914.

Thomas Stewart Grimshaw (9 December 1889 – 10 August 1958) was an Australian rules footballer who played with South Melbourne in the Victorian Football League (VFL).

Grimshaw was a defender who played 82 games in a row from debut, in the opening round of the 1908 VFL season. He was a member of South Melbourne's 1909 premiership team. Although he never kicked a goal in his league career, he came close in the 1909 VFL Grand Final when he hit the post in the third quarter. He had started the match in his usual position on a half-back flank and was knocked unconscious in a collision during the opening quarter. This prompted his move to full-forward.

A knee injury ended his run of games in 1912 and also cost him a spot in the 1912 Grand Final.

The defender returned to Victorian Football Association side Footscray in 1913, having played his junior football with the club. He participated in a premiership in his first season and then a losing grand final in 1914. His performance in Footscray's 1914 grand final loss to North Melbourne was called into question and he was one of five players sacked by Footscray, accused of "playing dead".
