= Ned Richardson =

Australian rules footballer

Personal information
- Full name: Nicholas Thomas Richardson
- Born: 26 May 1886; Walhalla, Victoria
- Died: 19 January 1929 (aged 42); Fitzroy, Victoria
- Original team: Beverley

Playing career^{1}
Years	Club	Games (Goals)
1908–1909	Fitzroy	2 (0)
1913–1915	Richmond	26 (4)
1915, 1918	Essendon	22 (2)
Total		50 (6)
- ^{1} Playing statistics correct to the end of 1918.

Nicholas Thomas "Ned" Richardson (26 May 1886 – 19 January 1929) was an Australian rules footballer who played with Fitzroy, Richmond and Essendon in the Victorian Football League (VFL).

Richardson, a half back from Beverley, had two stints in the VFL. He started out at Fitzroy but could only manage two appearances. When he returned to the league in 1913, at Richmond, he immediately became a regular member of the side, with 16 games for the year. He switched clubs during the 1915 VFL season but then had to sit out of league football for two years, as Essendon went into a war imposed recess. He resumed at Essendon in 1918 and was one of only two players from his club to appear in all 14 rounds.

Richardson also had a noted professional running career, specialising in middle-distance events.
