= Bill Franklin =

Australian rules footballer

Personal information
- Full name: William Franklin
- Born: 22 April 1884; Campbells Creek
- Died: 10 May 1968 (aged 84); Horsham
- Original team: Prahran

Playing career^{1}
Years	Club	Games (Goals)
1908	Fitzroy	5 (4)
- ^{1} Playing statistics correct to the end of 1908.

William Franklin (22 April 1884 – 10 May 1968) was an Australian rules footballer who played with Fitzroy in the Victorian Football League (VFL).
