= Andy Pattison =

Australian rules footballer

Personal information
- Full name: Andrew Chanel Pattison
- Born: 2 November 1885; Shepparton, Victoria
- Died: 12 June 1952 (aged 66); Melbourne, Victoria
- Original team: Caniambo
- Height: 183 cm (6 ft 0 in)
- Weight: 86 kg (190 lb)

Playing career^{1}
Years	Club	Games (Goals)
1908–1909	Carlton	8 (1)
1910–1911	Fitzroy	16 (0)
1912	Richmond	1 (0)
Total		25 (1)
- ^{1} Playing statistics correct to the end of 1912.

Andrew Chanel Pattison (2 November 1885 – 12 June 1952) was an Australian rules footballer who played for the Carlton Football Club, Fitzroy Football Club and Richmond Football Club in the Victorian Football League (VFL).
