= George Elliott (Australian rules footballer) =

Australian rules footballer (1885–1917)

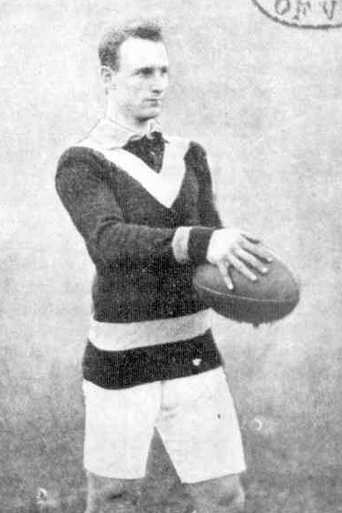
- Elliott in 1910

Personal information
- Full name: George Stephenson Elliott
- Born: 1 June 1885; Charlton, Victoria
- Died: 25 September 1917 (aged 32); Menin Road Ridge, Passchendaele salient, Belgium
- Original team: Ballarat College

Playing career^{1}
Years	Club	Games (Goals)
1905	Fitzroy	1 (0)
1908–1913	University	79 (3)
Total		80 (3)
- ^{1} Playing statistics correct to the end of 1913.

George Stephenson Elliott MC (1 June 1885 – 25 September 1917) was an Australian rules footballer who played with University and Fitzroy in the Victorian Football League (VFL).

== Family ==
The son of Thomas Elliott (1831–1911), and his wife Helen Elliott (1849–1933), née Janvrin, and the brother of AIF General Harold "Pompey" Elliott (1878–1931), and cousin of Admiral Sir Francis Tottenham, George Stephenson Elliott was born at Charlton, Victoria, on 1 June 1885. He married Alice Evelyn "Lyn" Walker on 30 October 1915; and they had a daughter, Jacquelyn Edmee (1916–1963), who later married John Edwin Fellows (1919–1995).

== Education ==
He was educated at Ballarat College and the University of Melbourne, and took a leading part in sport with both Ormond College and the university. He studied medicine, and graduated M.B.B.S. in September 1915.

== Football ==
A defender, Elliott played one game for Fitzroy in 1905 before becoming a member of the inaugural University side when they joined the league in 1908. He captained the club in 1911 and 1912.

== Military service ==
Elliott was killed in World War I at the Menin Road Ridge, having previously been awarded the Military Cross for gallantry.

== See also ==
- List of Victorian Football League players who died on active service
