= Mick Ryan (Australian footballer) =

Australian rules footballer

Personal information
- Full name: Michael Joseph Ryan
- Born: 23 June 1882; Dookie, Victoria
- Died: 29 September 1957 (aged 75); Yarraville, Victoria
- Original team: Seymour
- Height: 180 cm (5 ft 11 in)
- Weight: 84 kg (185 lb)

Playing career^{1}
Years	Club	Games (Goals)
1908	Collingwood	1 (0)
- ^{1} Playing statistics correct to the end of 1908.

Michael Joseph Ryan (23 June 1882 – 29 September 1957) was an Australian rules footballer who played with Collingwood in the Victorian Football League (VFL).
