= Henry Paternoster =

Australian rules footballer

Personal information
- Full name: Henry John Norman Paternoster
- Born: 8 July 1882; Gawler, South Australia
- Died: 15 July 1956 (aged 74); Pascoe Vale South, Victoria
- Original team: South Broken Hill

Playing career^{1}
| Years | Club | Games (Goals) |
| 1908 | South Melbourne | 2 (0) |
- ^{1} Playing statistics correct to the end of 1908.

Henry John Norman Paternoster (8 July 1882 – 15 July 1956) was an Australian rules footballer who played with South Melbourne in the Victorian Football League (VFL).
