= Jack Pender (footballer) =

Australian rules footballer

Personal information
- Full name: John Thomas Pender
- Born: 1 November 1885; Berringa, Victoria
- Died: 22 January 1937 (aged 51); Caulfield, Victoria
- Original team: Queenscliff

Playing career^{1}
Years	Club	Games (Goals)
1908	Geelong	4 (0)
- ^{1} Playing statistics correct to the end of 1908.

John Thomas Pender (1 November 1885 – 22 January 1937) was an Australian rules footballer who played with Geelong in the Victorian Football League (VFL).
