= Bill Davern =

Australian rules footballer

Personal information
- Full name: William James Davern
- Born: 3 September 1883; Hawthorn, Victoria
- Died: 4 June 1952 (aged 68); Parkville, Victoria
- Original team: Warrnambool / West Perth

Playing career^{1}
Years	Club	Games (Goals)
1908	Geelong	3 (2)
- ^{1} Playing statistics correct to the end of 1908.

William James Davern (3 September 1883 – 4 June 1952) was an Australian rules footballer who played with Geelong in the Victorian Football League (VFL).
