= Leo Duff =

Australian rules footballer

Personal information
- Full name: Leo Vivian Duff
- Born: 18 March 1885; Unley, South Australia
- Died: 24 January 1956 (aged 70); Kew, Victoria
- Original team: Essendon (VFA)

Playing career^{1}
| Years | Club | Games (Goals) |
| 1908 | St Kilda | 2 (1) |
- ^{1} Playing statistics correct to the end of 1908.

Leo Vivian Duff (18 March 1885 – 24 January 1956) was an Australian rules footballer who played with St Kilda in the Victorian Football League (VFL).
