= Mark Gardner (footballer) =

Australian rules footballer

Personal information
- Full name: Mark Clayson Gardner
- Born: 11 September 1884; Hawthorn, Victoria
- Died: 2 November 1949 (aged 65); East Melbourne, Victoria
- Original team: Melbourne Grammar

Playing career^{1}
Years	Club	Games (Goals)
1904–05, 1907	Melbourne	14 (1)
1908–09	University	21 (2)
Total		35 (3)
- ^{1} Playing statistics correct to the end of 1909.

Mark Clayson Gardner MC (11 September 1884 – 2 November 1949) was an Australian rules footballer who played with Melbourne and University in the Victorian Football League (VFL). He was the younger brother of Corrie Gardner and Eric Gardner.
