= Len Norman (footballer) =

Australian rules footballer

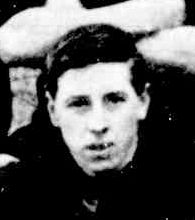

Personal information
- Full name: Leonard Tasman Norman
- Born: 9 October 1885; Launceston, Tasmania
- Died: 20 October 1944 (aged 59); Hobart, Tasmania
- Original team: City (Launceston)

Playing career^{1}
Years	Club	Games (Goals)
1908–09	Melbourne	30 (15)
- ^{1} Playing statistics correct to the end of 1909.

Leonard Tasman Norman (9 October 1885 – 20 October 1944) was an Australian rules footballer who played with Melbourne in the Victorian Football League (VFL).
