= Rupe Brownlees =

Australian rules footballer

Personal information
- Full name: Rupert Burt Brownlees
- Born: 26 April 1888; Penola, South Australia
- Died: 2 February 1960 (aged 71); Geelong West, Victoria
- Original team: Presbyterians
- Height: 178 cm (5 ft 10 in)
- Weight: 72 kg (159 lb)
- Position: Ruck

Playing career^{1}
Years	Club	Games (Goals)
1908–09, 1911–15, 1919	Geelong	100 (4)
- ^{1} Playing statistics correct to the end of 1919.

Rupert Burt Brownlees (26 April 1888 – 2 February 1960) was an Australian rules footballer who played with Geelong in the Victorian Football League (VFL).
