= Norm McGorlick =

Australian rules footballer

Personal information
- Full name: Norman William McGorlick
- Born: 28 November 1887; Collingwood, Victoria
- Died: 27 July 1962 (aged 74); Bluff, New Zealand

Playing career^{1}
Years	Club	Games (Goals)
1908	Geelong	3 (2)
- ^{1} Playing statistics correct to the end of 1908.

Norman William McGorlick (28 November 1887 – 27 July 1962) was an Australian rules footballer who played with Geelong in the Victorian Football League (VFL).

In 1910 he emigrated to New Zealand and he served in the New Zealand military in both World War I and World War II (major in the New Zealand Home Guard). In 1953, he was awarded the Queen Elizabeth II Coronation Medal.
