= Bill Carmody (footballer, born 1922) =

Australian rules footballer

Personal information
- Full name: Bill J. Carmody
- Born: 25 December 1922
- Died: 18 June 2001 (aged 78)
- Original team: St Kilda West CYMS (CYMSFA)
- Height: 178 cm (5 ft 10 in)
- Weight: 76 kg (168 lb)

Playing career^{1}
Years	Club	Games (Goals)
1946–1947	St Kilda	18 (19)
- ^{1} Playing statistics correct to the end of 1947.

Bill J. Carmody (25 December 1922 – 18 June 2001) was an Australian rules footballer who played for the St Kilda Football Club in the Victorian Football League (VFL).
