= George McCart =

Australian rules footballer

Personal information
- Full name: George John McCart
- Born: 24 June 1883; Dandenong, Victoria
- Died: 8 November 1931 (aged 48); Camberwell, Victoria
- Original team: Korumburra / West Melbourne (VFA)

Playing career^{1}
Years	Club	Games (Goals)
1905	Carlton	1 (0)
1906–7	West Melbourne (VFA)	27 (3)
1908	Melbourne	1 (0)
1908	Essendon A (VFA)	9 (6)
1909–10	St Kilda	2 (0)
- ^{1} Playing statistics correct to the end of 1910.

George John McCart (24 June 1883 – 8 November 1931) was an Australian rules footballer who played with Carlton, Melbourne and St Kilda in the Victorian Football League (VFL).

He died on 8 November 1931.
