= Joe Hodgkins =

Australian rules footballer

Personal information
- Full name: Joseph Arnold Hodgkins
- Born: 1 February 1886; Collingwood, Victoria
- Died: 24 March 1944 (aged 58); Brunswick West, Victoria
- Original team: Carlton District

Playing career^{1}
Years	Club	Games (Goals)
1908–11	Melbourne	24 (23)
- ^{1} Playing statistics correct to the end of 1911.

Joseph Arnold Hodgkins (1 February 1886 – 24 March 1944) was an Australian rules footballer who played with Melbourne in the Victorian Football League (VFL).
