= Robert Ritchie (footballer) =

Australian rules footballer (1884–1954)

Personal information
- Full name: Robert Charles Julien Ritchie
- Born: 22 January 1884; Geelong, Victoria
- Died: 10 June 1954 (aged 70); Parkville, Victoria
- Original team: Mercantile

Playing career^{1}
Years	Club	Games (Goals)
1908	Geelong	2 (0)
- ^{1} Playing statistics correct to the end of 1908.

Robert Charles Julien Ritchie (22 January 1884 – 10 June 1954) was an Australian rules footballer who played with Geelong in the Victorian Football League (VFL).

== Death ==
He died in Parkville on 10 June 1954.
