= Bert Bourchier =

Australian rules footballer

Personal information
- Full name: Bertram Gideon Bourchier
- Born: 27 August 1884; Corindhap, Victoria
- Died: 27 February 1958 (aged 73); Mount Gambier, South Australia
- Original team: Birregurra
- Height: 173 cm (5 ft 8 in)
- Weight: 71 kg (157 lb)

Playing career^{1}
Years	Club	Games (Goals)
1908	Geelong	1 (0)
- ^{1} Playing statistics correct to the end of 1908.

Bertram Gideon Bourchier (27 August 1884 – 27 February 1958) was an Australian rules footballer who played for the Geelong Football Club in the Victorian Football League (VFL).
