= Toner Hosking =

Australian rules footballer

Personal information
- Full name: Toner William Hosking
- Born: 9 May 1891; Deep Lead near Stawell, Victoria
- Died: 12 May 1963 (aged 72); Mornington, Victoria

Playing career^{1}
Years	Club	Games (Goals)
1908, 1910	South Melbourne	9 (1)
- ^{1} Playing statistics correct to the end of 1910.

Toner William Hosking (9 May 1891 – 12 May 1963) was an Australian rules footballer who played with South Melbourne in the Victorian Football League (VFL).

== Family ==
The son of Peter Joseph Murphy (1861–1894) and Emily Amelia (1869–1962), née Scarlett, Toner William Murphy was born at Deep Lead Railway Station just north of Stawell on 9 May 1891. After his father's death in 1894, his mother married Benjamin Edward Hosking and Toner subsequently took the Hosking name.

In 1917, Toner Hosking married Alice Annette Andrew (1893–1938) and they subsequently had three sons.
