= Charles Millsom =

Australian rules footballer

Personal information
- Full name: Charles Allerdale Millsom
- Born: 6 July 1885; Edwardstown, South Australia
- Died: 21 December 1912 (aged 27); Korumburra, Victoria
- Original team: City

Playing career^{1}
| Years | Club | Games (Goals) |
| 1908 | South Melbourne | 1 (0) |
- ^{1} Playing statistics correct to the end of 1908.

Charles Allerdale Millsom (6 July 1885 – 21 December 1912) was an Australian rules footballer who played with South Melbourne in the Victorian Football League (VFL).
