= Percy Stainer =

Australian rules footballer

Personal information
- Full name: Percy Amos Mozart Stainer
- Born: 4 October 1888; Carlton, Victoria
- Died: 8 July 1967 (aged 78); Frankston, Victoria
- Original team: North Melbourne (VFA)

Playing career^{1}
| Years | Club | Games (Goals) |
| 1907–08 | North Melbourne (VFA) | 6 (0) |
| 1908 | Richmond | 7 (0) |
| 1909–10 | New Norfolk (Tas) | |
| 1911 | St Kilda | 2 (0) |
- ^{1} Playing statistics correct to the end of 1911.

Percy Amos Mozart Stainer (4 October 1888 – 8 July 1967) was an Australian rules footballer who played with Richmond and St Kilda in the Victorian Football League (VFL).
