= Herbert Hurrey =

Australian rules footballer (1888–1961)

Personal information
- Full name: Herbert Grindell Hurrey
- Born: 27 January 1888; Herberton, Queensland
- Died: 16 December 1961 (aged 73); Chatswood, New South Wales
- Original team: Scotch College

Playing career^{1}
Years	Club	Games (Goals)
1908–1913	University	101 (29)
- ^{1} Playing statistics correct to the end of 1913.

Career highlights
- Games record holder for University

Herbert Grindell Hurrey (27 January 1888 – 16 December 1961) was an Australian rules footballer in the Victorian Football League who played for Melbourne University Football Club in the VFL from 1908 to 1913.

Hurrey played the most VFL/AFL games for the university club, with 101, and was the only player to play 100 games or more for the club in the top level of senior Australian rules football.

== Family ==
The third son of Charles Gisborne Hurrey (1846-1919), and Norah Hurrey (1852-1930), née O'Neill, Herbert Grindell Hurrey was born at Herberton, Queensland on 27 January 1888.

He married Nina Ethel Crockett (1891-1974), on 25 September 1914. They had five children, one of whom, a son, was born premature and died soon after his birth.

== Education ==
He was educated at Scotch College, Melbourne, and at the University of Melbourne, from whence he graduated (in absentia) as Bachelor of Medicine and Bachelor of Surgery (MBBS) on 4 April 1914 — his "in absentia" graduation was due to his decision to move to South Australia and begin practising medicine there — and where he was awarded a full blue for football in October 1913.

== Football ==
In 1912, he played in the centre for a representative VFL side against a combined Bendigo Football Association team, at Bendigo, on 3 July 1912.

In 1913, he was elected captain of the university team; and, on 16 August 1913, replacing Fitzroy's Harold McLennan (who was injured and could not play) in the team that had played in Adelaide on 12 July 1913, he played in the centre for Victoria, in its return match against South Australia, at the Melbourne Cricket Ground. Due to his move to South Australia, he was unable to continue playing VFL football in 1914.

== Military service ==
A Surgeon Lieutenant-Commander in the Royal Australian Navy Reserve, he served as a medical officer in the First World War:

"Surgeon-Lieut. [Herbert Grindell Hurrey], R.A.N. … left Brisbane October 21st, 1915, with the H.M.A. Destroyer Flotilla (Warrego, Yarra, and Parramatta), as M.O. in charge of flotilla. Service on high seas, Pacific, and China Station. Patrolling duties until April 21st, 1917. …"

== Medical practitioner ==
=== Registration ===
Having moved to South Australia following his final examinations at Melbourne University in 1913, he was registered, by the South Australian Medical Board, as a legally qualified medical practitioner for the State of South Australia on 9 April 1914.

His name (reg. no.4602) was removed from the Register of Medical Practitioners for New South Wales on 4 October 1961.

=== Health Officer ===
In 1919, he was appointed as Health Officer for the Kedron Shire Council in Queensland.

=== Partnership ===
In late 1924 he began practising in Rozelle and Balmain, New South Wales in joint partnership with Charles Herbert Wesley; the partnership was dissolved on 1 May 1925.

=== Goodyear Rubber factory ===
In September 1948 he was appointed medical officer for the Sydney factory of the Goodyear Rubber Company.

== Death ==
He died at Chatswood, New South Wales on 16 December 1961.
