= Alex Johnston (Australian rules footballer) =

Australian rules footballer

Personal information
- Full name: Alexander Johnston
- Born: 7 December 1881
- Died: 19 March 1965 (aged 83); Heidelberg, Victoria
- Original teams: Lancefield, North Melbourne (VFA)
- Height: 170 cm (5 ft 7 in)
- Weight: 72 kg (159 lb)

Playing career^{1}
Years	Club	Games (Goals)
1906	Carlton	6 (0)
1908	Richmond	1 (0)
Total		7 (0)
- ^{1} Playing statistics correct to the end of 1908.

Alexander Johnston (7 December 1881 – 19 March 1965) was an Australian rules footballer who played for the Carlton Football Club and Richmond Football Club in the Victorian Football League (VFL).
