= Bill Carmody (footballer, born 1889) =

Australian rules footballer

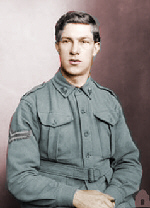
- Carmody in his WWI uniform

Personal information
- Full name: William Brendan Carmody
- Born: 27 July 1889; Flemington, Victoria
- Died: 7 April 1953 (aged 63); Brighton, Victoria
- Original team: Prahran
- Height: 183 cm (6 ft 0 in)
- Weight: 82 kg (181 lb)
- Position: Forward pocket

Playing career^{1}
Years	Club	Games (Goals)
1908	Carlton	1 (0)
- ^{1} Playing statistics correct to the end of 1908.

William Brendan Carmody (27 July 1889 – 7 April 1953) was an Australian rules footballer who played for the Carlton Football Club in the Victorian Football League (VFL). He later served in World War I.
