= Alex Boyd (footballer) =

Australian rules footballer

Personal information
- Full name: Alexander William Boyd
- Born: 4 November 1883; Geelong, Victoria
- Died: 28 July 1962 (aged 78); Fitzroy, Victoria
- Original team: Barwon

Playing career^{1}
Years	Club	Games (Goals)
1908–1910	Geelong	30 (0)
- ^{1} Playing statistics correct to the end of 1910.

Alexander William Boyd (4 November 1883 – 28 July 1962) was an Australian rules footballer who played for the Geelong Football Club in the Victorian Football League (VFL).
