= Martin Ratz =

Australian rules footballer

Personal information
- Full name: Martin Wilhelm Ratz
- Born: 14 October 1887; Collingwood, Victoria
- Died: 8 August 1943 (aged 55); St Kilda, Victoria
- Original team: Scotch College
- Position: Rover

Playing career^{1}
Years	Club	Games (Goals)
1908–1910	University	42 (52)
- ^{1} Playing statistics correct to the end of 1910.

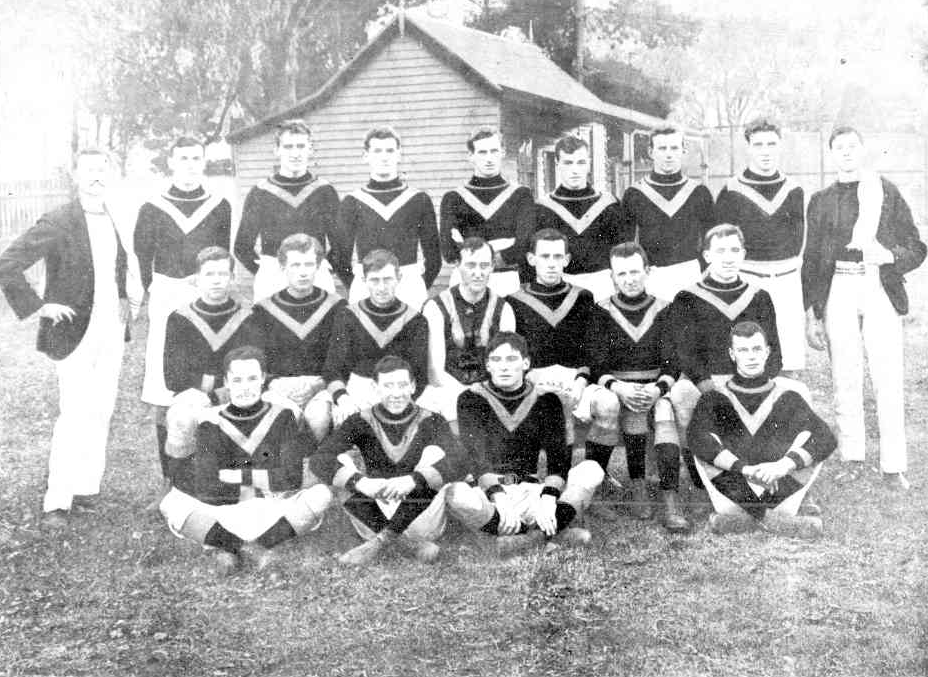
University VFL Team: 23 May 1908: M. Ratz, second from left, front row.

Martin Wilhelm Ratz (14 October 1887 – 8 August 1943) was an Australian rules footballer who played with University. He was also played cricket and football at Scotch College, Melbourne, before becoming a doctor.
