= Albert Hartkopf =

Australian sportsman

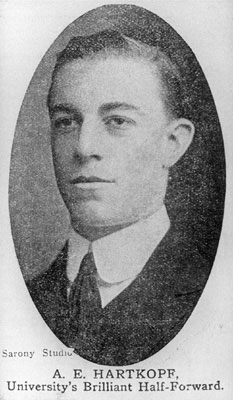

Personal information
- Full name: Albert Ernst Victor Hartkopf
- Born: 28 December 1889; Fitzroy North, Victoria
- Died: 20 May 1968 (aged 78); Kew, Victoria
- Batting: Right-handed
- Bowling: Legbreak

International information
- National side: Australia
- Only Test (cap 120): 1 January 1925 v England

Career statistics
Competition	Test	First-class
Matches	1	41
Runs scored	80	1,758
Batting average	40.00	34.47
100s/50s	0/1	2/12
Top score	80	126
Balls bowled	240	6,494
Wickets	1	121
Bowling average	134.00	30.79
5 wickets in innings	0	7
10 wickets in match	0	1
Best bowling	1/120	8/105
Catches/stumpings	0/–	36/–
- Source: CricInfo, 23 August 2019

Albert Ernst Victor Hartkopf (28 December 1889 – 20 May 1968) was an Australian sportsman who played Test cricket for Australia and Australian rules football for Melbourne University Football Club.

== Family ==
Born in North Fitzroy, Victoria to Ernst Robert Hartkopf (1849–1915), and Mary Louise Hartkopf (1859–1939), née Ranke, German migrants.

He married Isabel Faulks on 23 February 1918.

== Education ==
Hartkopf attended Scotch College, Melbourne from 1897 to 1909, attracting attention as a cricketer, footballer, and, especially, a star schoolboy athlete:

A. E. Hartkopf (S.C. [Scotch College]), however, was the champion of the meeting, winning no fewer than five championships [viz., Open 100 yards, 220 yards, 440 yards, shot put, and long jump (and came fourth in the Open high jump)] in four of them beating the previous best of these contests. Hartkopf is probably the most remarkable schoolboy athlete there has been in Victoria, as, in addition to his athletic ability, he is a prominent footballer in the University League team, and also playing for the Fitzroy club in cricket last year won their bowling average.

After Scotch College, Hartkopf studied medicine at the University of Melbourne, and graduated Bachelor of Medicine and Bachelor of Surgery (MBBS) on 17 April 1915.

== Football ==
Albert Hartkopf
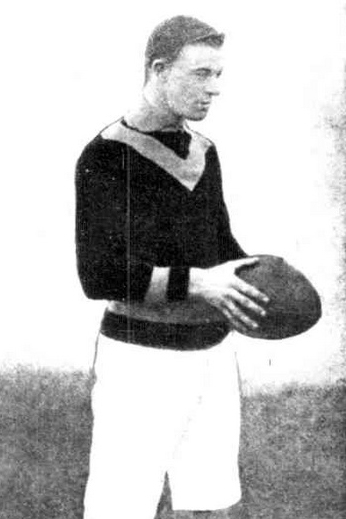
- Bert Hartkopf (1910)

Personal information
- Original team: Scotch College
- Position: Centre half-forward

Playing career^{1}
Years	Club	Games (Goals)
1908–11; 1914	University	48 (87)
- ^{1} Playing statistics correct to the end of 1914.

He represented University in the Victorian Football League. Renowned for the length and accuracy of his place-kicks, he played 48 games and kicking 87 goals.

== All-round athlete ==
In 1911, Hartkopf cemented his position as one of Australia's best all-round sportsmen by becoming the Victorian state 440 yards champion and making his first-class cricket debut for Victoria on 23 December 1911 against New South Wales at the Melbourne Cricket Ground, scoring an unbeaten 42 and a duck and taking 2/20 with his leg break bowling. He was a regular member of Victoria's cricket side and University's football side until injury and then World War I restricted Hartkopf's sporting career.

== Medicine ==
During World War I, Hartkopf worked first at the Royal Women's Hospital in Melbourne and then at the Royal Children's Hospital in Perth, Western Australia. There is no evidence to suggest his German background caused him problems during the war.

== Cricket ==
In 1919 Hartkopf returned to Melbourne, opening a medical practice in Northcote and returned to cricket, playing his first game for Victoria for six years, scoring 53 and 49 against New South Wales. In 1922/23 in a match for Victoria against the touring MCC he took 5 for 23 and 8 for 105, and scored 86 and 14 not out. In November 1924, an unbeaten half century for Victoria against the touring English side led to his selection, at age 35, in the Australian team for the second Test of the 1924/25 series against England at the MCG. Batting at number 8, Hartkopf scored 80 in Australia's first innings but could only produce match figures of 1/134 and was dropped from the team.

Hartkopf continued to play for Victoria until the end of the 1927/28 season but never returned to the national side. He then concentrated on his medical practice.

== Death ==
Albert Hartkopf died in Kew, Victoria, on 20 May 1968, after a long battle with rheumatoid arthritis.

Unusually, his obituary was not recorded in Wisden until 1994.
