= Tom Fogarty (footballer, born 1909) =

Australian rules footballer, born 1909

Personal information
- Full name: Thomas Bernard Fogarty
- Born: 15 May 1909; Caulfield, Victoria
- Died: 9 September 1984 (aged 75); Hawthorn, Victoria
- Original team: Auburn
- Height: 185 cm (6 ft 1 in)
- Weight: 79 kg (174 lb)

Playing career^{1}
Years	Club	Games (Goals)
1931–33	St Kilda	13 (2)
- ^{1} Playing statistics correct to the end of 1933.

Thomas Bernard Fogarty (15 May 1909 – 9 September 1984) was an Australian rules footballer who played with St Kilda in the Victorian Football League (VFL).
