= John Fogarty (footballer, born 1882) =

Australian rules footballer

Personal information
- Full name: John Joseph Fogarty
- Born: 5 March 1882; North Melbourne, Victoria
- Died: 13 November 1956 (aged 74); Toorak, Victoria
- Original team: St Pat's

Playing career^{1}
Years	Club	Games (Goals)
1902	South Melbourne	1 (0)
- ^{1} Playing statistics correct to the end of 1902.

John Joseph Fogarty (5 March 1882 – 13 November 1956) was an Australian rules footballer who played with South Melbourne in the Victorian Football League (VFL).
