= Melbourne University Football Club =

Australian rules football club

Melbourne University

Names
- Full name: Melbourne University Football Club
- Nickname(s): Students, Blacks, Blues, Mugars
- Former nickname: Varsity

2024 season
- Home-and-away season: Blacks: 7th Blues: 6th Mugars: 9th
- Leading goalkicker: Blacks: Ayui Makieng (22); Blues: James Stewart (45); Mugars: Asha Price (25)
- Best and fairest: Blacks: Henry Bennett; Blues: Martin Gleeson; Mugars: TBA

Club details
- Founded: 1859; 167 years ago
- Colours: Black Blue
- Competition: VAFA: Senior men and senior women
- Chairperson: MUFC: Andrew M. Donald; Blacks: Nick Carah; Blues: Andrew Lowcock
- Coach: Blacks: Cameron Roberts; Blues: Guy Martin (Blues)
- Captain(s): Blacks: Bede Mahon; Blues: Martin Gleeson
- Premierships: VAFA Premier (Blacks) (14): 1906; 1907; 1928; 1929; 1935; 1938; 1939; 1946; 1947; 1948; 1949; 1965; 1974; 2014; VAFA Premier (Blues) (6): 1921; 1922; 1952; 1960; 2004; 2019; VAFA Premier (Mugars) (1): 2018
- Ground: University of Melbourne Main Oval; Crawford Oval; Princes Park

Uniforms
Home	Away

Other information
- Official website: melbourneuniversityfc.com.au

Melbourne University Football Club, often known simply as University, is an Australian rules football club based at the University of Melbourne. Founded in 1859, it is one of the oldest football clubs in the world. The club fields two teams, known as the "Blacks" and "Blues", who both compete in the Victorian Amateur Football Association (VAFA) in the William Buck Premier Division and the women's team (nicknamed the "Mugars") in the VAFA Women's.

The club achieved prominence by being a member of Victoria's elite competition in the early 20th century, the Victorian Football League (VFL, now AFL), between 1908 and 1914, departing after its strict policy of amateurism left it uncompetitive in an increasingly professional league. It is one of only three clubs to leave the competition in its entire history. It is one of 13 clubs to have competed in both the VFA and the breakaway VFL competition prior to its expansion into a national competition. The women's team also competed at the highest level of women's competition, the Victorian Women's Football League (VWFL) and VFL Women's (VFLW) in 2016 prior to the formation of the national AFLW competition.

Although there are no records of its exact formation, University's first recorded match took place in the same month that the Castlemaine Football Club was formed, making it possible that University is the second-oldest club in Australia.

== History ==
=== Early history (1859–1907) ===
University was founded in 1859 by students and graduates of the University of Melbourne. The first report of the university participating in a match was against a club named St Kilda (unrelated to the later VFL/AFL club) in June 1859. According to ‘Gymnastic’, writing in the sporting newspaper Bell's Life in Victoria, the ‘long pending match’ finally came off between two teams of 15. University was captained by a player called Phillips, and St Kilda emerged the winners. The winning team under the rules at the time was the first team to score two out of three goals.

The 15 man team in 1859 consisted of: Messrs. Browning, Bromby, Curlewis, Craig, Davis, Greene, Hart, Jacomb, Molesworth, Patterson, Philips, Purcell, Nunn, Oldham, Stephen, Walker.

Shortly afterwards, it played against teams from Albert Park, Carlton, Melbourne, Royal Park and South Yarra. In 1861, University defeated Melbourne to win the first ever trophy for Australian rules football, instituted as part of the Caledonian Society's Games.

During the 1870s, the club played in the Second Twenties competition, the level below the main competition of the South Yarra Challenge Cup, except for in 1875 when it fielded a combined team with St. Kilda. From 1885 to 1888, University played in the VFA, which at the time was both the major governing body and top level of senior Australian rules football.

In Melbourne on 3 September 1888 the club defeated the Sydney University Australian Association Club in the first inter-varsity football match ever held in Australia under any code.

From 1888 to 1904, the club spent periods in recess or playing in other competitions, including the Metropolitan Junior Football Association and the Colleges Football Association, and from 1905 to 1907 as a dominant member of the Metropolitan Football Association.

The University club first played for the first time against a football team from the Adelaide University in September 1904 at the Adelaide Oval.

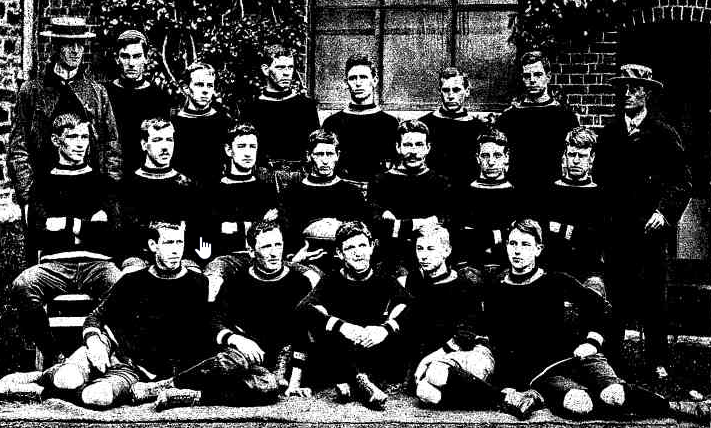
Melbourne University Football Team in 1904

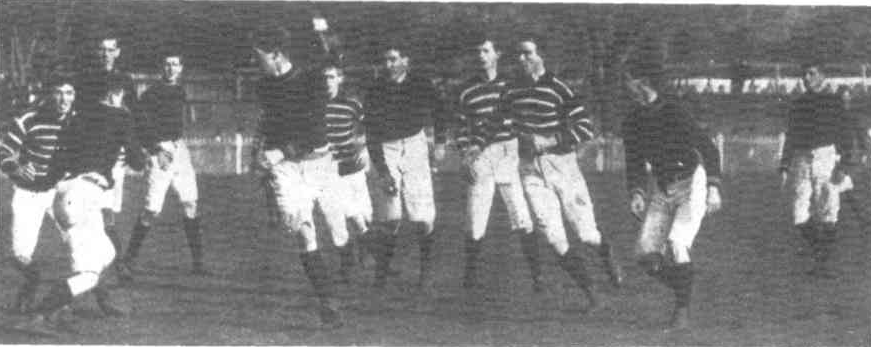
Action from 1907 Intervarsity final. Melbourne defeated Adelaide.

=== VFL history (1908–1914) ===
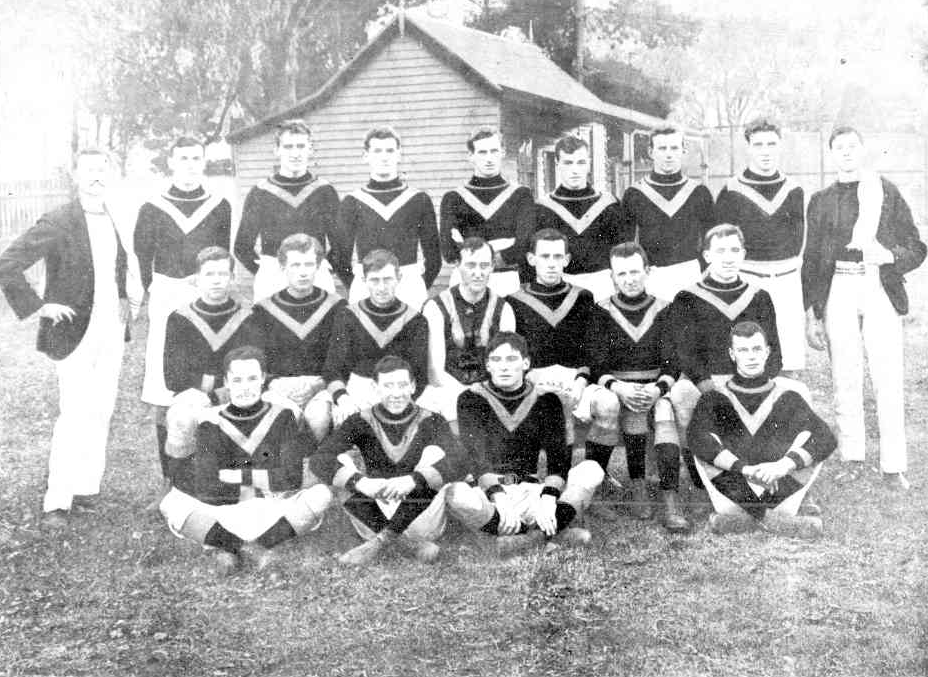
University VFL Team: 23 May 1908

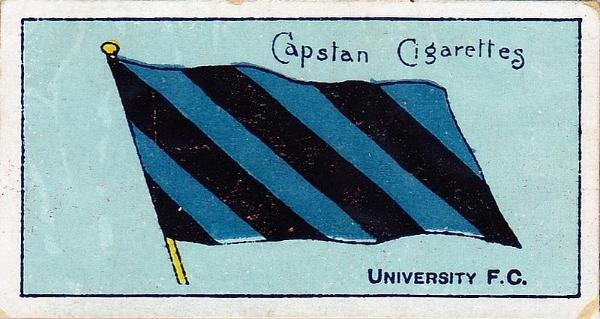
University's VFL club flag and colours

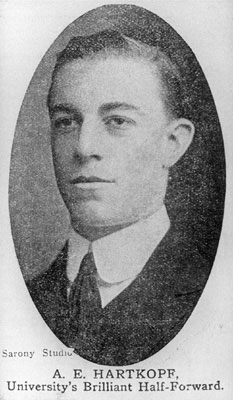
Albert Hartkopf, footballer in the University VFL team 1908–11 & 1914. The club's leading goalkicker in 1909 (17), 1910 (30) & 1911 (19), Hartkopf was also a fine cricketer, playing for Victoria from 1911 to 1928, as well as representing Australia in one Test.

On 4 October 1907, the eight founding clubs of the VFL voted to include University in the league as its ninth team, with the Richmond Football Club becoming the tenth team two weeks later. The club's home ground was originally the East Melbourne Cricket Ground, where it was a tenant of the Essendon Football Club; after a lengthy dispute with Essendon over rent, the club relocated in 1911 to the Melbourne Cricket Ground which it also shared, this time with the Melbourne Football Club.

The club was nicknamed The Students, The Professors and The Shop. The players wore a black guernsey with a blue chevron and blue collars and cuffs (the same design is still used to this day), black and blue socks, and an optional black and blue cap. Players had to have matriculated or hold a higher degree to be eligible to play in the team.

The club was not particularly successful: it never finished higher than sixth in the ten-team competition, and never played in the finals. It finished last in the competition from 1911 to 1914, and lost its last 51 games in a row. In total, it played 126 games for 27 wins, 2 draws and 97 losses between 1908 and 1914.

The club is unique among VFL/AFL clubs in never having any professional players, and this was a major factor in its decline in competitiveness after 1911, when player payments were becoming common amongst the other clubs.

It became clear that the club could not remain competitive or viable in the VFL if it wished to remain amateur, and the fact that its players were focussed primarily on their studies (particularly during mid-year examinations) was another logistical issue for the club. As a consequence, the club withdrew from the VFL at the end of 1914.

Many of its players transferred to the Melbourne Football Club, under an informal agreement between the clubs aimed at keeping the best University players together in the same club to keep the University intervarsity team strong.

==== VFL Honour roll ====
Chart of yearly ladder positions for University in VFL

Year	Position	Coach	Captain	Leading goalkicker (goals)
1908	6		Tom Fogarty	Martin Ratz (25)
1909	7		Harry Cordner	Albert Hartkopf (19)
1910	6	Gerald Brosnan	Edgar Kneen	Albert Hartkopf (30)
1911	10	Gerald Brosnan	George Elliot	Albert Hartkopf (19)
1912	10	Gerald Brosnan	George Elliot	Roy Park (22)
1913	10	Victor Upton-Brown	Bert Hurrey	Roy Park (53)
1914	10	Gerald Brosnan	Jack West	Roy Park (36)

==== University VFL players ====
Overall, 112 players played at least one game for University in the Victorian Football League between 1908 and 1914; and, of that 112, at least 20 died in active service in either World War I or World War II (see List of Victorian Football League players who died on active service).

Bert Hurrey played the most games for the club, with 101, and was the only University player to play at least 100 games in the VFA or VFL, while Roy Park was the club's leading goalscorer, kicking 111 goals between 1912 and 1914: Park also won the VFL's Leading Goalkicker Award in 1913 with 53 goals for the home-and-away season, a remarkable effort considering the team itself scored only 115 goals and finished last on the ladder without a win.

==== VFL coaches ====
The following is a list of coaches to have coached the club in the VFL.

P = Played
W = Won
L = Lost
D = Drew
W% = Win percentage

No.	Coach	P	W	L	D	W%	Years
1	Gerald Brosnan	72	12	60	0	16.67	1910–14
2	Victor Upton-Brown	18	0	18	0	0.00	1913

=== Post-VFL and post-war reformation (1919–) ===
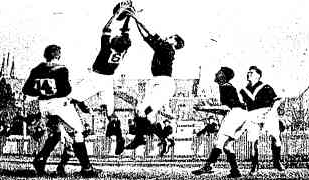
Melbourne defeats Adelaide in the intervarsity final in 1923

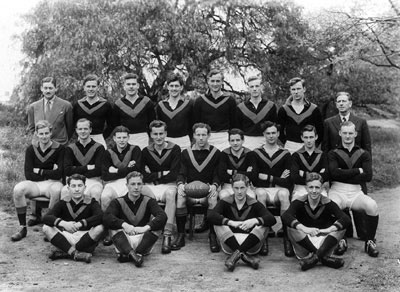
Melbourne University – A grade premiership team of 1946

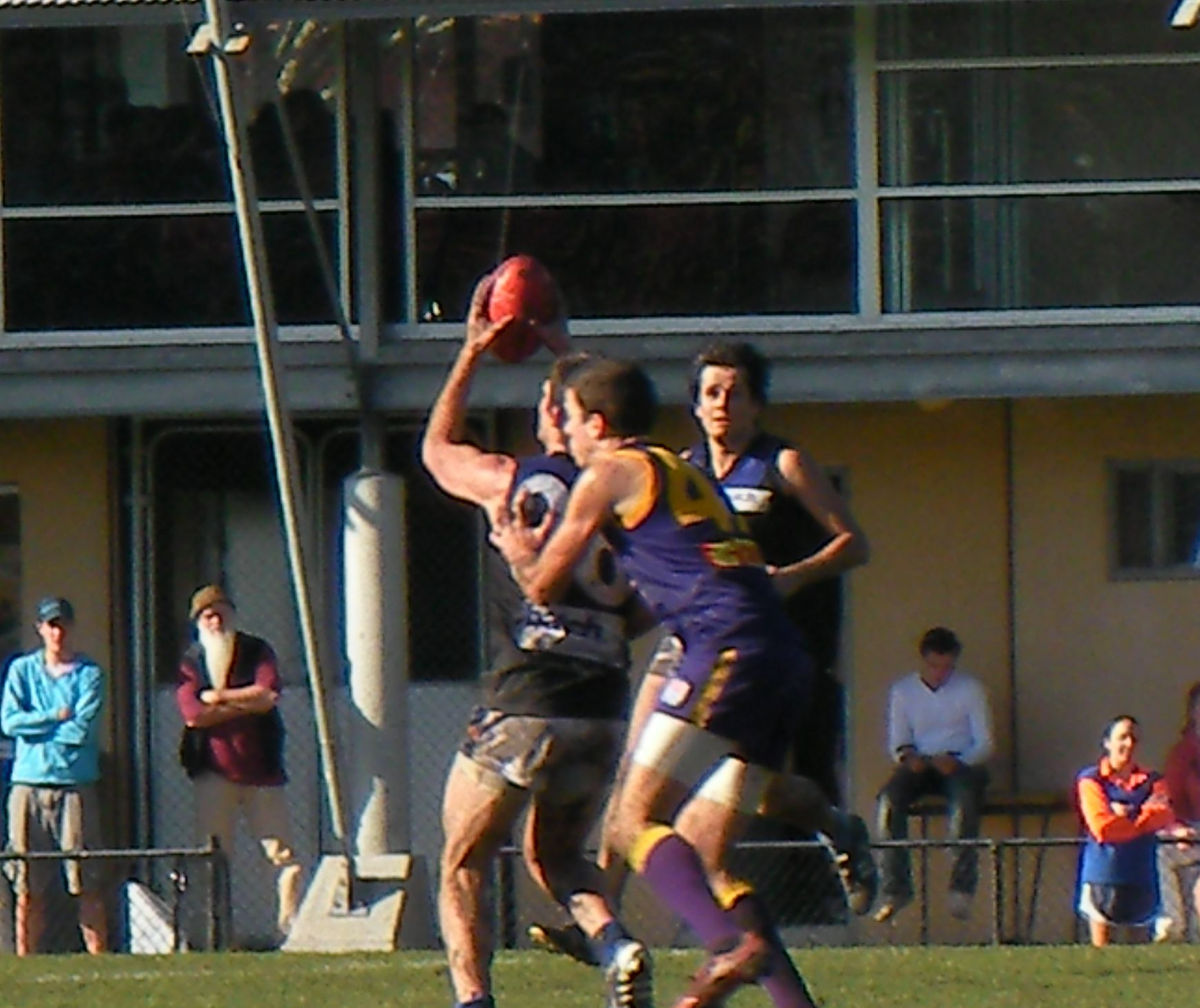
A Melbourne University Blues player takes a mark in front of a Collegians opponent in a 2008 VAFA A- Section reserves match

In the summer of 1919, after the War, Melbourne University began to rebuild its football involvement. Deciding not to reapply for a position in the VFL, they were instead requested by the VFL to supply two teams to the newly formed VFL reserves competition, or the Victorian Junior Football League. These two teams were initially called University A and University B, but soon became known as "University Blues" and "University Blacks", respectively (although the names did not become official until 1930).

The Blues contested the 1919 and 1920 VJFL grand finals, losing to Collingwood on both occasions; the Blacks, who joined the 1919 VJFL season only at short notice when Melbourne was unable to organise its own junior team, moved to the Metropolitan Amateur Football Association in 1920, and the following season, were joined by the Blues. Both contested the 1921 MAFA Grand Final, with the Blacks winning what to date is the only grand final the two teams have contested in the MAFA or VAFA.

Melbourne University students and alumni continue to maintain their involvement in football through the Blues and Blacks. The Melbourne University Football Club is unique in that it only plays as "Melbourne University" in inter-university matches, and its regular weekly competition is provided through its component teams, University Blues and University Blacks. The Blues and Blacks play in the Victorian Amateur Football Association, and have been a perennial power in the highest division of a high-standard amateur competition.

Up until the 1950s, the Blacks were the leading University side as well as one of the dominant sides in the Amateur competition, winning 11 A-Section premierships by 1949, including a record six premierships in a row between 1938 and 1949 (the 1940–1945 seasons not being played due to World War II). However, in the later part of the century the Blues established themselves as the premier University side, and are currently the longest serving club to play in the top division of the VAFA.

The Blacks have won a total of 14 A-section flags (their most recent in 2014 & the most in the VAFA). The Blues have won a total of 4 A-section flags (with their most recent being in 2019).

Throughout their history, the Blues and Blacks have often played together in A section of the MAFA/VAFA, and with the Blacks return to A section in 2008 after a prolonged absence, the teams met again for the first time in 25 years. In head-to-head matches, the Blues lead the win tally with 43 wins to the Blacks 36, and one draw. The Blacks and the Blues added to their head-to-head history in 2015 after the Blues won promotion after only one year in B section in 2014. Unfortunately the Blacks dropped to B in 2018.

Both teams have consistently been a spawning ground for young players who go on to the AFL. To date, 240 MUFC players have played in the VFL/AFL competition.

From 1955 until 1996, an additional team was fielded by the club called University Reds which competed in the lower sections of the VAFA with a firsts and reserves team. When the team was discontinued by the club, players and supporters of the team decided to keep the team operating as the Fitzroy Reds. The Reds merged with the Fitzroy Football Club in 2008.

== Women's team ==
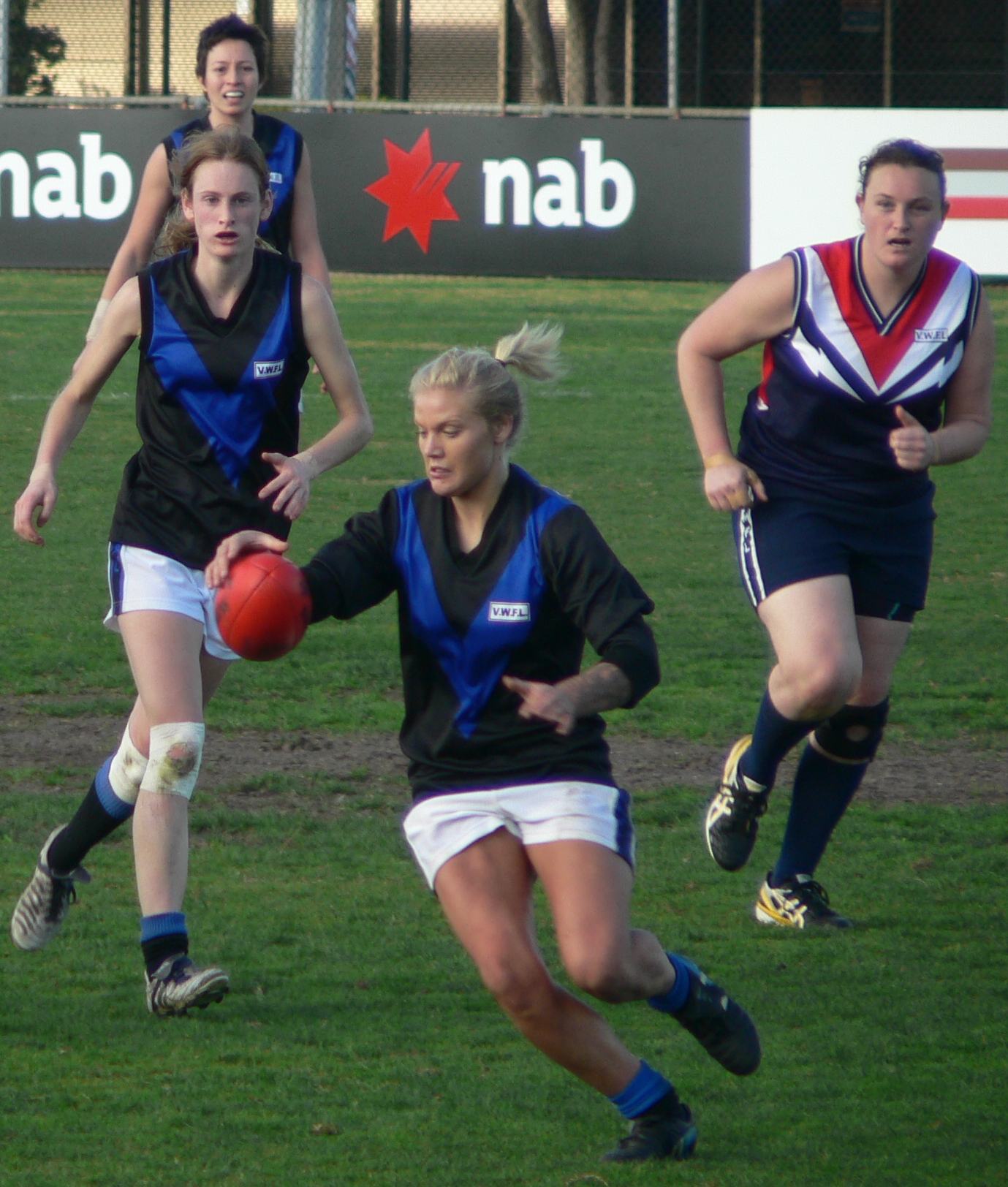
Melbourne University women's team during their 2007 VWFL Grand Final appearance.

A women's side was formed in 1996 as a stand-alone side that did not fall under the Melbourne University Football Club. The club was named Melbourne University Women's Football Club and was nicknamed the MUGARS, an acronym for Melbourne University Girls Australian Rules Squad. In 2016, the MUWFC became a part of the MUFC and is equally represented alongside the Blacks and Blues sides on the MUFC board.

The MUWFC field three senior sides and three junior sides across three different leagues. Historically having senior teams in both the Victorian Women's Football League and WRFL/EDFL Youth Girls Competition, in 2016, upon formation of the inaugural statewide competition aligned with the Victorian Football League, MUWFC entered a senior side, with a second and third team competing in the Premier Division and Division 3 of the Victorian Women's Football League respectively. The WRFL/EDFL Youth Girls Competition also expanded from under-13s side and under-18s side to also include and under-15s side.

In 2002, MUWFC won their first premiership against St Albans in Division 1. This was followed by double premierships in 2003 and 2005, to make up the club's five premierships.

In 2005, an Under-18s Youth Girls team was formed. They started competing in the Essendon Districts Football League in 2012.

From 2009, North Melbourne partnered with the club, allowing them to use Arden Street Oval for training and matches. Under this arrangement, Melbourne University served as North Melbourne's VFL Women's affiliate from 2016 until the end of 2019, when North Melbourne decided to field a standalone team instead.

In 2011, an Under-12s team was established in conjunction with North Melbourne Football Club.

The club also facilitates intervarsity teams, for both the Southern University Games and Australian University Games.

== Honours ==
=== Premierships ===
University Blacks
Competition	Level	Wins	Years won
Victorian Amateur Football Association	Premier	14	1906, 1907, 1928, 1929, 1935, 1938, 1939, 1946, 1947, 1948, 1949, 1965, 1974, 2014
Victorian Amateur Football Association	Premier B	2	1964, 2012
Victorian Amateur Football Association	Premier C	1	2005
Victorian Amateur Football Association	E Central	1	1997
VAFA reserves
VAFA reserves	Division 1	1	2004
VAFA reserves	Division 2	1	2000
Challenge Cup	Seniors	2	1862, 1895
University Blues
Victorian Amateur Football Association	William Buck Premier	6	1921, 1922, 1952, 1960, 2004, 2019
Victorian Amateur Football Association	Premier B	3	1967, 1981, 2014
University Mugars
Victorian Amateur Football Association	William Buck Premier	1	2018
Victorian Women's Football League	Premier	1	2005
Victorian Women's Football League	Division 1	2	2002, 2003
Victorian Women's Football League	Premier Reserves	1	2005
VWFL Division 2	Reserves	1	2002

== See also ==
- University Football Club players
- Adelaide University Football Club
- Sydney University Students AFC
- University of Queensland Australian Football Club

== Bibliography ==
- Black & Blue: The Story of Football at the University of Melbourne. J Cordner et al., 2007.
- Kevin Taylor, The Sydney Swans. Allen & Unwin, 1987.
- Rodgers, S and A Browne, Every Game Ever Played : VFL/AFL Results 1897–1997, (Ringwood, Vic. : Viking, 1998)
