= 1908 VFL season =

Twelfth season of the Victorian Football League (VFL)

1908 VFL premiership season
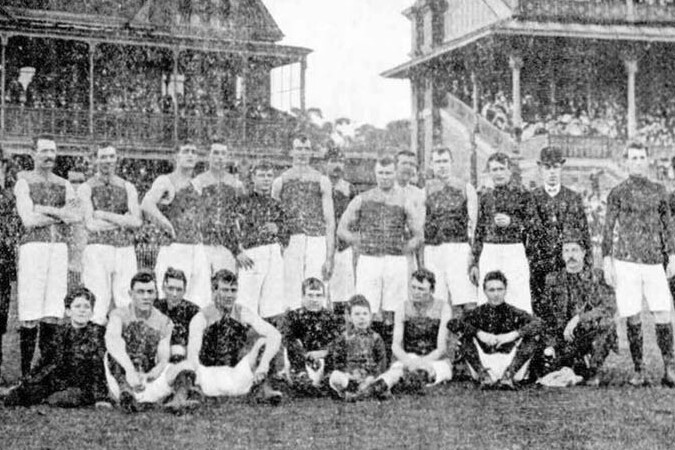
- Carlton 1908 VFL premiership team
- Date: 2 May – 26 September 1908
- Teams: 10
- Premiers: Carlton; 3rd premiership
- Minor premiers: Carlton; 3rd minor premiership
- Leading goalkicker medallist: Dick Lee (Collingwood); 54 goals
- Matches played: 93

The 1908 VFL season was the twelfth season of the Victorian Football League (VFL), the highest-level senior Australian rules football competition in Victoria. The season featured ten clubs and ran from 2 May to 26 September, comprising an 18-match home-and-away season followed by a three-week finals series featuring the top four clubs. Victorian Football Association (VFA) club Richmond and Metropolitan Junior Football Association (MJFA) club University featured for the first time in 1908.

Carlton won the premiership, defeating Essendon by nine points in the 1908 VFL grand final; it was Carlton's third (consecutive and overall) VFL premiership, marking the first time a club won three consecutive VFL premierships. Carlton also won its third consecutive minor premiership by finishing atop the home-and-away ladder with a 17–1 win–loss record. Collingwood's Dick Lee won his second consecutive leading goalkicker medal as the league's leading goalkicker.

== Background ==
In 1908, the VFL competition consisted of ten teams of 18 on-the-field players each, with no "reserves", although any of the 18 players who had left the playing field for any reason could later resume their place on the field at any time during the match.

Each team played each other twice in a home-and-away season of 18 rounds.

Once the 18 round home-and-away season had finished, the 1908 VFL Premiers were determined by the specific format and conventions of the amended "Argus system".

== Home-and-away season ==
=== Round 1 ===
Home team	Home team score	Away team	Away team score	Venue	Date
Fitzroy	6.8 (44)	South Melbourne	7.11 (53)	Brunswick Street Oval	2 May 1908
Essendon	14.11 (95)	University	3.11 (29)	EMCG	2 May 1908
Carlton	6.12 (48)	St Kilda	3.4 (22)	Princes Park	2 May 1908
Richmond	8.14 (62)	Melbourne	7.9 (51)	Punt Road Oval	2 May 1908
Geelong	12.13 (85)	Collingwood	5.8 (38)	Corio Oval	2 May 1908

=== Round 2 ===
Home team	Home team score	Away team	Away team score	Venue	Date
Collingwood	3.14 (32)	Fitzroy	9.9 (63)	Victoria Park	9 May 1908
University	14.10 (94)	Richmond	12.4 (76)	EMCG	9 May 1908
South Melbourne	7.9 (51)	Geelong	4.8 (32)	Lake Oval	9 May 1908
St Kilda	7.6 (48)	Essendon	12.14 (86)	Junction Oval	9 May 1908
Melbourne	6.8 (44)	Carlton	9.8 (62)	MCG	9 May 1908

=== Round 3 ===
Home team	Home team score	Away team	Away team score	Venue	Date
Geelong	7.8 (50)	Melbourne	10.12 (72)	Corio Oval	16 May 1908
Carlton	5.13 (43)	Essendon	4.8 (32)	Princes Park	16 May 1908
South Melbourne	4.2 (26)	St Kilda	7.13 (55)	Lake Oval	16 May 1908
Richmond	7.13 (55)	Fitzroy	11.14 (80)	Punt Road Oval	16 May 1908
University	7.12 (54)	Collingwood	8.14 (62)	EMCG	16 May 1908

=== Round 4 ===
Home team	Home team score	Away team	Away team score	Venue	Date
St Kilda	5.10 (40)	University	8.6 (54)	Junction Oval	23 May 1908
Melbourne	12.3 (75)	South Melbourne	10.13 (73)	MCG	23 May 1908
Fitzroy	7.18 (60)	Geelong	6.8 (44)	Brunswick Street Oval	23 May 1908
Essendon	11.16 (82)	Richmond	6.9 (45)	EMCG	23 May 1908
Collingwood	5.9 (39)	Carlton	10.7 (67)	Victoria Park	23 May 1908

=== Round 5 ===
Home team	Home team score	Away team	Away team score	Venue	Date
South Melbourne	12.4 (76)	University	9.11 (65)	Lake Oval	30 May 1908
Carlton	10.12 (72)	Fitzroy	5.10 (40)	Princes Park	30 May 1908
St Kilda	9.12 (66)	Melbourne	2.13 (25)	Junction Oval	30 May 1908
Richmond	8.17 (65)	Geelong	8.11 (59)	Punt Road Oval	30 May 1908
Essendon	10.9 (69)	Collingwood	9.10 (64)	EMCG	30 May 1908

=== Round 6 ===
Home team	Home team score	Away team	Away team score	Venue	Date
Geelong	5.9 (39)	St Kilda	6.6 (42)	Corio Oval	6 June 1908
Collingwood	12.7 (79)	Richmond	9.10 (64)	Victoria Park	6 June 1908
University	12.7 (79)	Melbourne	1.13 (19)	EMCG	6 June 1908
Fitzroy	5.8 (38)	Essendon	5.12 (42)	Brunswick Street Oval	6 June 1908
South Melbourne	7.9 (51)	Carlton	8.5 (53)	Lake Oval	6 June 1908

=== Round 7 ===
Home team	Home team score	Away team	Away team score	Venue	Date
Richmond	9.9 (63)	South Melbourne	11.11 (77)	Punt Road Oval	8 June 1908
Carlton	13.14 (92)	Geelong	2.13 (25)	Princes Park	8 June 1908
University	9.7 (61)	Fitzroy	12.12 (84)	EMCG	8 June 1908
Melbourne	10.6 (66)	Essendon	10.12 (72)	MCG	8 June 1908
St Kilda	12.11 (83)	Collingwood	5.12 (42)	Junction Oval	8 June 1908

=== Round 8 ===
Home team	Home team score	Away team	Away team score	Venue	Date
Geelong	4.11 (35)	University	5.9 (39)	Corio Oval	13 June 1908
Fitzroy	7.6 (48)	St Kilda	12.9 (81)	Brunswick Street Oval	13 June 1908
Essendon	8.11 (59)	South Melbourne	6.9 (45)	EMCG	13 June 1908
Collingwood	8.8 (56)	Melbourne	4.8 (32)	Victoria Park	13 June 1908
Carlton	17.13 (115)	Richmond	2.15 (27)	Princes Park	13 June 1908

=== Round 9 ===
Home team	Home team score	Away team	Away team score	Venue	Date
St Kilda	9.5 (59)	Richmond	3.15 (33)	Junction Oval	20 June 1908
Melbourne	4.4 (28)	Fitzroy	3.7 (25)	MCG	20 June 1908
Geelong	3.7 (25)	Essendon	7.9 (51)	Corio Oval	20 June 1908
South Melbourne	9.11 (65)	Collingwood	6.8 (44)	Lake Oval	20 June 1908
University	6.15 (51)	Carlton	7.15 (57)	EMCG	20 June 1908

=== Round 10 ===
Home team	Home team score	Away team	Away team score	Venue	Date
Melbourne	11.16 (82)	Richmond	1.6 (12)	MCG	27 June 1908
Collingwood	9.12 (66)	Geelong	7.4 (46)	Victoria Park	27 June 1908
South Melbourne	2.19 (31)	Fitzroy	2.6 (18)	Lake Oval	27 June 1908
University	6.10 (46)	Essendon	7.14 (56)	EMCG	27 June 1908
St Kilda	6.5 (41)	Carlton	10.12 (72)	Junction Oval	27 June 1908

=== Round 11 ===
Home team	Home team score	Away team	Away team score	Venue	Date
Richmond	11.5 (71)	University	8.14 (62)	Punt Road Oval	4 July 1908
Geelong	9.4 (58)	South Melbourne	9.12 (66)	Corio Oval	4 July 1908
Essendon	5.10 (40)	St Kilda	8.9 (57)	EMCG	4 July 1908
Carlton	8.15 (63)	Melbourne	4.7 (31)	Princes Park	4 July 1908
Fitzroy	6.6 (42)	Collingwood	7.2 (44)	Brunswick Street Oval	4 July 1908

=== Round 12 ===
Home team	Home team score	Away team	Away team score	Venue	Date
St Kilda	5.4 (34)	South Melbourne	4.5 (29)	Junction Oval	11 July 1908
Fitzroy	4.9 (33)	Richmond	5.4 (34)	Brunswick Street Oval	11 July 1908
Collingwood	3.13 (31)	University	2.2 (14)	Victoria Park	11 July 1908
Melbourne	9.12 (66)	Geelong	7.6 (48)	MCG	11 July 1908
Essendon	6.6 (42)	Carlton	4.5 (29)	EMCG	11 July 1908

=== Round 13 ===
Home team	Home team score	Away team	Away team score	Venue	Date
Carlton	10.17 (77)	Collingwood	5.7 (37)	Princes Park	18 July 1908
University	7.14 (56)	St Kilda	5.13 (43)	EMCG	18 July 1908
South Melbourne	5.10 (40)	Melbourne	11.8 (74)	Lake Oval	18 July 1908
Geelong	7.14 (56)	Fitzroy	11.8 (74)	Corio Oval	18 July 1908
Richmond	7.3 (45)	Essendon	9.14 (68)	Punt Road Oval	18 July 1908

=== Round 14 ===
Home team	Home team score	Away team	Away team score	Venue	Date
Melbourne	16.11 (107)	St Kilda	8.3 (51)	MCG	25 July 1908
Geelong	6.17 (53)	Richmond	5.8 (38)	Corio Oval	25 July 1908
Collingwood	8.12 (60)	Essendon	8.8 (56)	Victoria Park	25 July 1908
University	11.7 (73)	South Melbourne	10.11 (71)	EMCG	25 July 1908
Fitzroy	4.9 (33)	Carlton	6.8 (44)	Brunswick Street Oval	25 July 1908

=== Round 15 ===
Home team	Home team score	Away team	Away team score	Venue	Date
Melbourne	7.12 (54)	University	8.10 (58)	MCG	1 August 1908
Essendon	8.13 (61)	Fitzroy	7.8 (50)	EMCG	1 August 1908
Carlton	8.19 (67)	South Melbourne	6.5 (41)	Princes Park	1 August 1908
St Kilda	17.5 (107)	Geelong	5.8 (38)	Junction Oval	1 August 1908
Richmond	11.8 (74)	Collingwood	10.9 (69)	Punt Road Oval	1 August 1908

=== Round 16 ===
Home team	Home team score	Away team	Away team score	Venue	Date
Fitzroy	13.16 (94)	University	11.7 (73)	Brunswick Street Oval	8 August 1908
Essendon	17.17 (119)	Melbourne	8.11 (59)	EMCG	8 August 1908
Collingwood	10.10 (70)	St Kilda	7.9 (51)	Victoria Park	8 August 1908
South Melbourne	18.12 (120)	Richmond	4.4 (28)	Lake Oval	8 August 1908
Geelong	5.9 (39)	Carlton	6.13 (49)	Corio Oval	8 August 1908

=== Round 17 ===
Home team	Home team score	Away team	Away team score	Venue	Date
University	13.18 (96)	Geelong	6.8 (44)	EMCG	15 August 1908
St Kilda	4.7 (31)	Fitzroy	3.4 (22)	Junction Oval	15 August 1908
South Melbourne	5.8 (38)	Essendon	3.14 (32)	Lake Oval	15 August 1908
Melbourne	4.8 (32)	Collingwood	6.9 (45)	MCG	15 August 1908
Richmond	4.17 (41)	Carlton	6.12 (48)	Punt Road Oval	15 August 1908

=== Round 18 ===
Home team	Home team score	Away team	Away team score	Venue	Date
Richmond	16.11 (107)	St Kilda	6.8 (44)	Punt Road Oval	5 September 1908
Fitzroy	11.18 (84)	Melbourne	1.4 (10)	Brunswick Street Oval	5 September 1908
Essendon	13.20 (98)	Geelong	3.9 (27)	EMCG	5 September 1908
Collingwood	12.16 (88)	South Melbourne	3.4 (22)	Victoria Park	5 September 1908
Carlton	10.7 (67)	University	4.4 (28)	Princes Park	5 September 1908

== Ladder ==
(P)	Premiers
	Qualified for finals

#	Team	P	W	L	D	PF	PA	%	Pts
1	Carlton (P)	18	17	1	0	1125	664	169.4	68
2	Essendon	18	14	4	0	1160	814	142.5	56
3	St Kilda	18	10	8	0	955	942	101.4	40
4	Collingwood	18	10	8	0	966	996	97.0	40
5	South Melbourne	18	9	9	0	975	962	101.4	36
6	University	18	8	10	0	1032	1075	96.0	32
7	Fitzroy	18	7	11	0	932	852	109.4	28
8	Melbourne	18	7	11	0	927	1065	87.0	28
9	Richmond	18	6	12	0	940	1275	73.7	24
10	Geelong	18	2	16	0	803	1170	68.6	8

Rules for classification: 1. premiership points; 2. percentage; 3. points for
Average score: 54.5
Source: AFL Tables

== Finals series ==
=== Semi-finals ===
Home team	Home team score	Away team	Away team score	Venue	Date	
Essendon	9.14 (68)	Collingwood	5.3 (33)	MCG	12 September 1908	Attendance: 24,700
Carlton	12.12 (84)	St Kilda	3.8 (26)	MCG	19 September 1908	Attendance: 26,100

=== Grand final ===
Team	1 Qtr	2 Qtr	3 Qtr	Final
Carlton	2.3	5.4	5.5	5.5 (35)
Essendon	1.1	2.4	3.5	3.8 (26)

== Season notes ==
- Richmond Football Club and University Football Club were admitted to the VFL competition.
- With fiery former Collingwood coach Dick Condon as playing coach and former Collingwood champion Charlie Pannam as captain, Richmond won its first VFL match against Melbourne, 8.14 (62) to 7.9 (51). University had its first VFL victory in the second round of the season, beating Richmond 14.10 (94) to 12.4 (76).
- In the first round match between Fitzroy and South Melbourne at the Brunswick Street Oval, an umpire was hit by a stone thrown by a spectator.
- The sixth round match between Fitzroy and Essendon, also at the Brunswick Street Oval, was a fiery affair that resulted in a number of suspensions. A horde of Fitzroy supporters invaded the ground immediately the final bell had rung, kicking, punching and otherwise assaulting Essendon players as they tried to leave the playing field. Essendon fans also jumped the fence, in order to protect their players. A riot ensued.
- A ten-day Carnival, the "Jubilee of Australasian Football (1858–1908)" was held in Melbourne in August 1908, involving teams from New South Wales, New Zealand, Queensland, South Australia, Tasmania, Victoria, and Western Australia.
- At an official Carnival function, when proposing a toast to "The Australasian Game" the Prime Minister of Australia, the Melbourne-born Alfred Deakin (1856–1919) spoke of his youthful experiences of playing a rudimentary form of Australian football.

== Awards ==
- The 1908 VFL Premiership team was Carlton.
- The VFL's leading goalkicker was Dick Lee of Collingwood with 54 goals.
- Geelong took the "wooden spoon" in 1908.

== Sources ==
- 1908 VFL season at AFL Tables
- 1908 VFL season at Australian Football
