= List of VFL debuts in 1911 =

Debuts in the Victorian Football League

The 1911 Victorian Football League (VFL) season was the fifteenth season of the VFL. The season saw 135 Australian rules footballers make their senior VFL debut and a further 30 transfer to new clubs having previously played in the VFL.

== Summary ==
Summary of debuts in 1911
| Club | VFL debuts | Change of club |
|---|---|---|
| Carlton | 13 | 4 |
| Collingwood | 10 | 2 |
| Essendon | 8 | 3 |
| Fitzroy | 18 | 4 |
| Geelong | 8 | 0 |
| Melbourne | 10 | 5 |
| Richmond | 12 | 2 |
| St Kilda | 32 | 8 |
| South Melbourne | 6 | 1 |
| University | 18 | 1 |
| Total | 135 | 30 |

== Debuts ==
| Name | Club | Age at debut | Round debuted | Games | Goals | Notes |
|---|---|---|---|---|---|---|
| Viv Valentine | Carlton | 23 years, 154 days | 2 | 116 | 91 | |
| Billy Dick | Carlton | 21 years, 322 days | 6 | 100 | 35 | Uncle of Ian and Alexander Dick. Previously played for Fitzroy. |
| Gordon Green | Carlton | 21 years, 88 days | 5 | 92 | 85 | |
| Ned Bowen | Carlton | 21 years, 260 days | 1 | 28 | 14 | |
| Roy Johnson | Carlton | 19 years, 285 days | 1 | 15 | 21 | |
| Fen McDonald | Carlton | 20 years, 65 days | 15 | 10 | 4 | Brother of Arch and Ted McDonald. |
| Harry Matheson | Carlton | 19 years, 321 days | 1 | 7 | 3 | Previously played for St Kilda. |
| Tommy Hughes | Carlton | 20 years, 145 days | 9 | 6 | 1 | |
| Bruce Campbell | Carlton | 20 years, 362 days | 1 | 3 | 0 | |
| Charlie Taylor | Carlton | 32 years, 1042 days | 1 | 3 | 0 | Previously played for Melbourne. |
| Herbert Cock | Carlton | 23 years, 67 days | 4 | 3 | 0 | Previously played for Collingwood. |
| Harry Jane | Carlton | 20 years, 299 days | 6 | 3 | 1 | |
| Les Rowe | Carlton | 20 years, 189 days | 2 | 2 | 0 | |
| Bert Cowley | Carlton | 25 years, 129 days | 9 | 2 | 0 | |
| Fred Marriott | Carlton | 25 years, 137 days | 11 | 2 | 0 | |
| Tom Hanson | Carlton | 19 years, 301 days | 1 | 1 | 0 | |
| John Gunter | Carlton | 27 years, 334 days | 15 | 1 | 0 | |
| Alec Mutch | Collingwood | 22 years, 29 days | 1 | 144 | 5 | |
| Jack Green | Collingwood | 23 years, 272 days | 5 | 108 | 6 | Previously played for Geelong. |
| George Anderson | Collingwood | 26 years, 0 days | 6 | 104 | 8 | |
| Mal Seddon | Collingwood | 23 years, 38 days | 12 | 102 | 56 | |
| Dan Minogue | Collingwood | 19 years, 237 days | 1 | 85 | 37 | |
| Paddy Rowan | Collingwood | 21 years, 364 days | 5 | 82 | 28 | |
| Jim Sharp | Collingwood | 29 years, 17 days | 6 | 18 | 0 | Previously played for Fitzroy. |
| Eddie Thomas | Collingwood | 20 years, 14 days | 12 | 7 | 1 | |
| Billy Hammond | Collingwood | 23 years, 214 days | 5 | 4 | 1 | Brother of Charlie and Jack Hammond. |
| Jack Sheehan | Collingwood | 20 years, 349 days | 3 | 3 | 0 | |
| John Somer | Collingwood | 20 years, 21 days | 3 | 1 | 0 | |
| Billy Holmes | Collingwood | 21 years, 114 days | 4 | 1 | 0 | |
| Jack Kirby | Essendon | 22 years, 0 days | 11 | 77 | 113 | |
| Wally Chalmers | Essendon | 20 years, 232 days | 2 | 73 | 11 | |
| Dan Hanley | Essendon | 28 years, 38 days | 10 | 67 | 9 | |
| Bill Walker | Essendon | 24 years, 243 days | 1 | 66 | 53 | |
| Vernon Hazel | Essendon | 21 years, 204 days | 4 | 12 | 4 | Amateur welterweight champion of Victoria in 1916. Previously played for St Kilda and Melbourne. |
| Rupe Benstead | Essendon | 21 years, 342 days | 3 | 4 | 0 | |
| Johnny Hart | Essendon | 22 years, 266 days | 10 | 4 | 0 | |
| Charlie Hay | Essendon | 29 years, 213 days | 7 | 2 | 0 | Previously played for Carlton. |
| Edgar Masters | Essendon | 22 years, 266 days | 12 | 1 | 0 | |
| Artie Freeman | Essendon | 23 years, 308 days | 14 | 1 | 0 | Previously played for Collingwood and Fitzroy. |
| Jimmy Jones | Essendon | 22 years, 93 days | 14 | 1 | 0 | |
| Fred Bamford | Fitzroy | 24 years, 47 days | 5 | 119 | 1 | |
| George Shaw | Fitzroy | 25 years, 35 days | 2 | 117 | 48 | |
| Charlie Norris | Fitzroy | 29 years, 343 days | 11 | 106 | 19 | Oldest player to debut in the VFL/AFL and go on to play 100 games. Great-great-grandfather of Will Hoskin-Elliott. Previously played for Collingwood. |
| Teddy Buist | Fitzroy | 25 years, 360 days | 1 | 59 | 15 | |
| Cliff Hutton | Fitzroy | 23 years, 283 days | 2 | 34 | 7 | |
| Frank Lamont | Fitzroy | 24 years, 263 days | 1 | 17 | 9 | |
| Tom Reardon | Fitzroy | 23 years, 304 days | 3 | 16 | 4 | |
| Bruce Campbell | Fitzroy | 21 years, 51 days | 10 | 15 | 27 | Previously played for Carlton. |
| Clarrie Dall | Fitzroy | 23 years, 275 days | 6 | 10 | 10 | |
| Charlie Dowell | Fitzroy | 23 years, 129 days | 7 | 7 | 0 | |
| Charlie McMillan | Fitzroy | 23 years, 177 days | 10 | 7 | 3 | |
| Jack Furness | Fitzroy | 20 years, 249 days | 1 | 6 | 3 | |
| Tom McCluskey | Fitzroy | 20 years, 255 days | 3 | 5 | 0 | Previously played for Carlton. |
| Thornton Clarke | Fitzroy | 19 years, 174 days | 4 | 4 | 0 | |
| Ernie Everett | Fitzroy | 26 years, 116 days | 1 | 3 | 0 | |
| Bill Moxon | Fitzroy | 26 years, 121 days | 6 | 3 | 0 | |
| Fred Markby | Fitzroy | 26 years, 121 days | 2 | 2 | 0 | |
| Tom Moloughney | Fitzroy | 22 years, 203 days | 1 | 1 | 0 | |
| Danny Murphy | Fitzroy | 27 years, 66 days | 1 | 1 | 0 | |
| Eric Watson | Fitzroy | 17 years, 230 days | 1 | 1 | 1 | |
| Artie Freeman | Fitzroy | 23 years, 231 days | 2 | 1 | 0 | Previously played for Collingwood. |
| Alby Sheehan | Fitzroy | 23 years, 263 days | 15 | 1 | 0 | |
| Arthur Francis | Fitzroy | 24 years, 258 days | 16 | 1 | 0 | |
| Jack Gray | Geelong | 25 years, 311 days | 10 | 77 | 8 | |
| Leo Healy | Geelong | 20 years, 240 days | 9 | 75 | 23 | |
| Neil Freeman | Geelong | 21 years, 8 days | 1 | 45 | 1 | Later became an Australian Army Brigadier. |
| Bert Schofield | Geelong | 20 years, 352 days | 16 | 11 | 6 | |
| Sid Smith | Geelong | 20 years, 186 days | 1 | 5 | 4 | |
| Tom Martin | Geelong | 22 years, 200 days | 7 | 5 | 5 | |
| Norm Grigg | Geelong | 17 years, 318 days | 2 | 4 | 1 | |
| Alan Cordner | Geelong | 21 years, 105 days | 16 | 3 | 0 | Half brother of Laurence Cordner and cousin of Harry and "Ted" Cordner. |
| Alf George | Melbourne | 26 years, 241 days | 2 | 55 | 12 | Previously played for Essendon. |
| Wally Naismith | Melbourne | 29 years, 333 days | 1 | 36 | 0 | Twin brother of Charlie Naismith, brother-in-law of Alf Dummett and father of Alby and Herb Naismith. Previously played for Fitzroy. |
| Ted Politz | Melbourne | 21 years, 338 days | 6 | 26 | 19 | |
| Bill Hickey | Melbourne | 25 years, 119 days | 5 | 20 | 1 | |
| Mal Kennedy | Melbourne | 18 years, 216 days | 6 | 17 | 4 | |
| Leo Rush | Melbourne | 20 years, 321 days | 5 | 6 | 4 | Brother of Bob, Bryan, Gerald and Kevin Rush. |
| Ben Sheppard | Melbourne | 20 years, 331 days | 4 | 4 | 1 | Played first-class cricket for Victoria. |
| Billy Irwin | Melbourne | 26 years, 204 days | 2 | 2 | 1 | |
| Ken Edgar | Melbourne | 20 years, 337 days | 5 | 2 | 0 | Previously played for St Kilda. |
| Harold Curran | Melbourne | 23 years, 7 days | 9 | 2 | 0 | |
| Bill McKeone | Melbourne | 22 years, 70 days | 1 | 1 | 0 | |
| George St John | Melbourne | 33 years, 15 days | 1 | 1 | 0 | Previously played for Richmond. |
| Jack Geggie | Melbourne | 29 years, 196 days | 3 | 1 | 0 | Previously played for Essendon. |
| Jimmy Nolan | Melbourne | 17 years, 289 days | 5 | 1 | 0 | |
| Jim Moore | Melbourne | 20 years, 149 days | 14 | 1 | 0 | |
| Ted Farrell | Richmond | 21 years, 213 days | 4 | 41 | 2 | Previously played for Fitzroy. |
| Bill Jones | Richmond | 21 years, 213 days | 1 | 19 | 3 | |
| Joe Price | Richmond | 24 years, 341 days | 8 | 7 | 2 | |
| Les Irwin | Richmond | 24 years, 85 days | 5 | 6 | 0 | Previously played for Melbourne. |
| Johnny MacGregor | Richmond | 21 years, 184 days | 7 | 4 | 0 | |
| Gerald Hogan | Richmond | 19 years, 354 days | 17 | 4 | 4 | |
| Norm Brooker | Richmond | 21 years, 325 days | 16 | 3 | 0 | |
| Bertie Wollacott | Richmond | 21 years, 136 days | 16 | 3 | 3 | |
| Dave Mahoney | Richmond | 18 years, 341 days | 2 | 2 | 1 | |
| Mick Schade | Richmond | 24 years, 63 days | 5 | 2 | 1 | |
| George May | Richmond | 19 years, 234 days | 1 | 1 | 0 | |
| Arch Robinson | Richmond | 20 years, 301 days | 2 | 1 | 0 | |
| Matt Incigneri | Richmond | 20 years, 141 days | 10 | 1 | 1 | Brother of Len Incigneri. |
| Artie Harrison | Richmond | 18 years, 171 days | 15 | 1 | 0 | |
| Roy Cazaly | St Kilda | 18 years, 197 days | 15 | 99 | 39 | Inducted into the Australian Football Hall of Fame as one of the inaugural twelve Legends. Brother of Ernest Cazaly. |
| Ernie Sellars | St Kilda | 21 years, 11 days | 11 | 47 | 119 | |
| Paul White | St Kilda | 18 years, 46 days | 16 | 20 | 5 | |
| Alex MacKenzie | St Kilda | 29 years, 134 days | 5 | 13 | 1 | |
| Bill Patterson | St Kilda | 22 years, 240 days | 3 | 11 | 0 | Coached St Kilda for one match in 1938. |
| Wally Graham | St Kilda | 21 years, 190 days | 1 | 8 | 0 | |
| Joe Stephens | St Kilda | 23 years, 280 days | 1 | 8 | 2 | |
| Bob Briggs | St Kilda | 27 years, 195 days | 6 | 7 | 7 | Previously played for Fitzroy. |
| Bill Goddard | St Kilda | 31 years, 99 days | 6 | 7 | 0 | Previously played for South Melbourne and Carlton. |
| Charlie Taylor | St Kilda | 32 years, 177 days | 6 | 7 | 1 | Previously played for Melbourne and Carlton. |
| Ted Brown | St Kilda | 19 years, 214 days | 4 | 4 | 0 | Father of Vincent and John Brown. |
| Aubrey Hart | St Kilda | 17 years, 349 days | 16 | 4 | 1 | |
| Reg Gregson | St Kilda | 20 years, 75 days | 1 | 3 | 2 | |
| Henry Merrett | St Kilda | 24 years, 353 days | 9 | 3 | 0 | |
| Harold Parker | St Kilda | 18 years, 264 days | 9 | 3 | 0 | |
| Bert Butler | St Kilda | 22 years, 149 days | 12 | 3 | 0 | |
| Claude Crowl | St Kilda | 18 years, 251 days | 15 | 3 | 0 | Cousin of Joe Crowl. |
| Rowley Smith | St Kilda | 20 years, 41 days | 15 | 3 | 0 | |
| Vic Gordon | St Kilda | 20 years, 283 days | 16 | 3 | 0 | |
| Percy Stainer | St Kilda | 22 years, 207 days | 1 | 2 | 0 | Previously played for Richmond. |
| Albert Biggs | St Kilda | 21 years, 354 days | 3 | 2 | 0 | |
| George O'Connor | St Kilda | 19 years, 53 days | 4 | 2 | 0 | Previously played for Richmond. |
| Claude Hunt | St Kilda | 23 years, 172 days | 5 | 2 | 0 | |
| Norm Ingham | St Kilda | 21 years, 86 days | 16 | 2 | 0 | |
| Fred Linay | St Kilda | 21 years, 23 days | 16 | 2 | 2 | |
| Sam Mortimer | St Kilda | 18 years, 169 days | 2 | 1 | 1 | |
| Tom Handley | St Kilda | 25 years, 147 days | 4 | 1 | 0 | |
| Arthur Newbound | St Kilda | 25 years, 84 days | 5 | 1 | 1 | Previously played for Fitzroy. |
| Alby Bowtell | St Kilda | 24 years, 32 days | 15 | 1 | 0 | |
| Peter Donnelly | St Kilda | 20 years, 160 days | 15 | 1 | 0 | |
| Alf Hammond | St Kilda | 17 years, 92 days | 15 | 1 | 0 | |
| Otto O'Pelt | St Kilda | 23 years, 167 days | 15 | 1 | 0 | |
| Tom Soutar | St Kilda | 18 years, 135 days | 15 | 1 | 0 | Represented Australia in the 1919 Inter-Allied Games. |
| Bill Ward | St Kilda | 19 years, 235 days | 15 | 1 | 0 | |
| Henry Bray | St Kilda | 20 years, 67 days | 16 | 1 | 0 | |
| Brodie Ainslie | St Kilda | 20 years, 9 days | 16 | 1 | 0 | |
| Jack Whittle | St Kilda | 21 years, 228 days | 17 | 1 | 0 | |
| Gordon Robinson | St Kilda | 23 years, 143 days | 18 | 1 | 0 | Brother of Alex, Bill and Fred Robinson and uncle of Alexander William and George Robinson. |
| Henry McNamara | St Kilda | 27 years, 208 days | 16 | 1 | 0 | |
| Charles Suhr | St Kilda | 26 years, 48 days | 17 | 1 | 0 | Previously played for Melbourne. |
| Mark Tandy | South Melbourne | 18 years, 252 days | 3 | 207 | 47 | |
| Herbert Milne | South Melbourne | 27 years, 115 days | 6 | 31 | 14 | Previously played for Fitzroy. |
| Tom Strownix | South Melbourne | 24 years, 362 days | 1 | 14 | 1 | |
| George Deas | South Melbourne | 22 years, 339 days | 18 | 4 | 3 | |
| Ben Main | South Melbourne | 23 years, 358 days | 3 | 1 | 0 | |
| Fred Fielding | South Melbourne | 21 years, 263 days | 5 | 1 | 0 | |
| Ernie George | South Melbourne | 23 years, 250 days | 10 | 1 | 0 | 1913 Stawell Gift winner. |
| Vic Trood | University | 19 years, 134 days | 1 | 41 | 8 | |
| Bill Hinman | University | 18 years, 344 days | 8 | 35 | 3 | Brother of Arthur Hinman. |
| Eric Woods | University | 18 years, 159 days | 4 | 34 | 0 | |
| Joe Shelley | University | 18 years, 223 days | 1 | 23 | 11 | |
| Allan McCracken | University | 22 years, 16 days | 1 | 22 | 8 | |
| Bill Denehy | University | 21 years, 363 days | 1 | 21 | 5 | |
| Dave Cumming | University | 19 years, 247 days | 6 | 21 | 34 | |
| George Anderson | University | 24 years, 156 days | 1 | 20 | 1 | Previously played for South Melbourne. |
| Harold Bennett | University | 19 years, 324 days | 1 | 17 | 2 | |
| Bob Thompson | University | 20 years, 69 days | 3 | 14 | 6 | |
| Frank Macky | University | 19 years, 159 days | 5 | 7 | 2 | His parents drowned in the sinking of the RMS Lusitania. |
| Victor Hurley | University | 23 years, 186 days | 12 | 7 | 0 | |
| Will Armstrong | University | 19 years, 31 days | 4 | 3 | 0 | |
| Ray Whitford | University | 21 years, 287 days | 16 | 3 | 0 | |
| Alan Tait | University | 20 years, 70 days | 12 | 2 | 0 | |
| Reg McGillicuddy | University | 19 years, 356 days | 13 | 2 | 0 | |
| Alec Birrell | University | 26 years, 95 days | 1 | 1 | 0 | |
| Jim Nicholas | University | 20 years, 233 days | 12 | 1 | 0 | |
| Clifton Tucker | University | 23 years, 165 days | 18 | 1 | 0 | |
