= List of University Football Club players =

This is a list of University Football Club players who made one or more appearance in the Victorian Football League. University competed in the VFL from 1908 until 1914.

Players are listed by the date of their VFL debut with the club. In cases of players debuting in the same game, they are listed alphabetically.

== University Football Club players ==
Key
Order	Players are listed in order of debut
Seasons	Includes Melbourne only careers and spans from when a player was first listed with the club to their final year on the list
Debut	Debuts are for VFL regular season and finals series matches only
Games	Statistics are for VFL regular season and finals series matches only.
Goals	Statistics are for VFL regular season and finals series matches only.

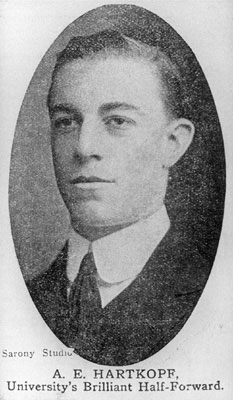
Albert Hartkopf played 48 games and scored 87 goals for University from 1908 to 1914.

=== 1900s ===
Order	Name	Seasons	Debut	Games	Goals
1	Gilbert Barker	1908	round 1, 1908	6	2
2	Frank Boynton	1908–1910	round 1, 1908	25	12
3	Denby Browning	1908–1910	round 1, 1908	38	25
4	Harry Cordner	1908–1909	round 1, 1908	29	7
5	Edward Cordner	1908–1912	round 1, 1908	60	8
6	Frank Crawford	1908–1911	round 1, 1908	36	0
7	George Elliott	1908–1913	round 1, 1908	79	3
8	Chris Fogarty	1908–1910	round 1, 1908	26	12
9	Joe Fogarty	1908	round 1, 1908	5	1
10	Tom Fogarty	1908–1909	round 1, 1908	19	5
11	John Gray	1908–1913	round 1, 1908	85	3
12	Ken Kendall	1908	round 1, 1908	1	0
13	Edgar Kneen	1908–1912	round 1, 1908	46	48
14	William Marshall	1908	round 1, 1908	11	0
15	Alick Ogilvie	1908–1909	round 1, 1908	27	20
16	Martin Ratz	1908–1910	round 1, 1908	42	52
17	Lance Sleeman	1908	round 1, 1908	8	1
18	Athol Tymms	1908–1913	round 1, 1908	60	29
19	Norm Richards	1908–1910	round 2, 1908	46	5
20	Leo Seward	1908	round 2, 1908	15	15
21	Jack West	1908–1910, 1912–1914	round 3, 1908	71	17
22	Ted Fleming	1908	round 4, 1908	1	0
23	Mal Williams	1908	round 4, 1908	7	0
24	Herbert Hurrey	1908–1913	round 6, 1908	101	29
25	Jack Jones	1908–1909, 1913	round 6, 1908	40	3
26	Albert Hartkopf	1908–1911, 1914	round 7, 1908	48	87
27	John Laing	1908	round 7, 1908	2	0
28	Mark Gardner	1908–1909	round 9, 1908	21	2
29	Herbert Bowden	1908	round 10, 1908	8	5
30	Arthur Gall	1908	round 10, 1908	2	0
31	Frank Kirby	1908	round 16, 1908	1	0
32	Jim Piper	1908–1909	round 18, 1908	2	0
33	Alex Grant	1909–1910	round 1, 1909	2	0
34	Frank Kerr	1909–1911, 1913	round 1, 1909	40	10
35	Rupe Matthews	1909–1911	round 1, 1909	20	20
36	Arthur Wilson	1909–1911	round 1, 1909	51	3
37	Norman Yeo	1909	round 1, 1909	2	2
38	Alex Robertson	1909	round 2, 1909	10	0
39	Rupert Balfe	1909, 1911	round 3, 1909	7	2
40	Norman Good	1909	round 3, 1909	4	0
41	Frank Dossetor	1909	round 4, 1909	3	0
42	Dave Greenham	1909–1912	round 9, 1909	51	9
43	Jack Brake	1909–1914	round 10, 1909	81	21
44	Simon Fraser	1909	round 11, 1909	2	0
45	Hugh Boyd	1909	round 14, 1909	1	2
46	Stan Martin	1909–1914	round 17, 1909	65	4
47	Ron Larking	1909	round 18, 1909	1	0
48	Tom O'Brien	1909–1910	round 18, 1909	3	3

=== 1910s ===
Order	Name	Seasons	Debut	Games	Goals
49	Keith Doig	1910–1914	round 1, 1910	44	15
50	Bill Lyon	1910–1911	round 1, 1910	7	1
51	Ken McLeod	1910–1913	round 1, 1910	54	33
52	Arthur Hinman	1910–1911	round 3, 1910	24	1
53	Pat Morrissey	1910	round 10, 1910	4	6
54	George Anderson	1911, 1913–1914	round 1, 1911	20	1
55	Harold Bennett	1911	round 1, 1911	17	2
56	Alec Birrell	1911	round 1, 1911	1	0
57	Allan McCracken	1911–1912	round 1, 1911	22	8
58	Joe Shelley	1911–1914	round 1, 1911	23	11
59	Vic Trood	1911–1914	round 1, 1911	41	8
60	Robert Thompson	1911, 1913	round 3, 1911	14	6
61	William Armstrong	1911	round 4, 1911	3	0
62	Eric Woods	1911–1914	round 4, 1911	34	0
63	Bill Denehy	1911–1912	round 5, 1911	21	0
64	Frank Macky	1911	round 5, 1911	7	2
65	Dave Cumming	1911–1912	round 6, 1911	21	34
66	Bill Hinman	1911, 1913–1914	round 8, 1911	38	2
67	Victor Hurley	1911	round 12, 1911	7	0
68	Jim Nicholas	1911	round 12, 1911	1	0
69	Reg McGillicuddy	1911	round 13, 1911	2	0
70	Alan Tait	1911	round 16, 1911	1	0
71	Ray Whitford	1911	round 16, 1911	3	0
72	Clifton Tucker	1911	round 18, 1911	1	1
73	Ramsay Anderson	1912	round 1, 1912	3	0
74	Dick Gibbs	1912–1914	round 1, 1912	35	3
75	Lester Kelly	1912–1914	round 1, 1912	40	0
76	Leo Little	1912–1913	round 1, 1912	34	20
77	Les Primrose	1912–1913	round 1, 1912	16	0
78	Carl Willis	1912–1914	round 1, 1912	46	41
79	Bill Walker	1912–1913	round 2, 1912	10	3
80	Roy Park	1912–1914	round 4, 1912	44	111
81	John Robinson	1912	round 4, 1912	1	0
82	Arch Corbett	1912–1913	round 5, 1912	7	0
83	Athol Milne	1912–1913	round 5, 1912	10	2
84	Westmore Stephens	1912–1914	round 6, 1912	10	0
85	Tommy Graham	1912	round 8, 1912	8	1
86	Bruce Lang	1912	round 9, 1912	6	1
87	John Nicholson	1912	round 9, 1912	1	0
88	Jack Doubleday	1912–1914	round 11, 1912	36	17
89	Bill McIlroy	1913	round 1, 1913	3	0
90	Fred McIntosh	1913–1914	round 1, 1913	25	4
91	Stan Neale	1913–1914	round 1, 1913	28	0
92	Billy Newing	1913	round 1, 1913	5	5
93	Ernie Atkins	1913–1914	round 5, 1913	23	7
94	Wilfrid Heron	1913–1914	round 6, 1913	23	5
95	Ashley Vines	1913–1914	round 13, 1913	17	0
96	Norm Barker	1913	round 15, 1913	1	0
97	Claude Bryan	1914	round 1, 1914	7	0
98	Will Houghton	1914	round 1, 1914	2	0
99	Leslie Marks	1914	round 1, 1914	14	13
100	Percy Rodriguez	1914	round 1, 1914	17	1
101	Heinrich Schrader	1914	round 1, 1914	13	4
102	Cyril Seelenmeyer	1914	round 2, 1914	6	1
103	Wally Don	1914	round 3, 1914	15	0
104	Reuben Patton	1914	round 3, 1914	6	0
105	Jim Houghton	1914	round 5, 1914	3	0
106	Gerald Johnston	1914	round 6, 1914	11	0
107	Cyril Steele	1914	round 6, 1914	1	0
108	Howard Stafford	1914	round 8, 1914	5	2
109	Frank Cameron	1914	round 9, 1914	8	0
110	Bob Heatley	1914	round 14, 1914	4	0
111	Adrian Farmer	1914	round 17, 1914	1	2
112	Gordon Morrissey	1914	round 17, 1914	2	0
