= Bill Hickey =

Bill Hickey may refer to:

- Bill Hickey (American football coach), former coach of the Coast Guard Bears in college football
- Bill Hickey (footballer, born 1880) (1880–1969), former Australian rules footballer for South Melbourne and Carlton
- Bill Hickey (footballer, born 1886) (1886–1973), former Australian rules footballer for Melbourne
- Bill Hickey (bobsleigh) (born 1936), competed for the United States at the 1964 Winter Olympics

== See also ==
- Bill Hicke (1938–2005), Canadian ice hockey right winger
- William Hickey (disambiguation)
