= John Gunter =

John Gunter may refer to:

- John Gunter (football manager), secretary-manager of Middlesbrough F.C.
- John Gunter (footballer), Australian rules footballer

== See also ==
- John Gunther (1901–1970), American journalist and author
- John Gunther (public servant) (1910–1984), Australian public servant
