= Walter Graham =

Walter Graham may refer to:

- Pud Graham (Walter A. Graham, 1936–2011), politician in Mississippi who served in the state senate including as its president
- Walter D. Graham (1885–1927), American football player
- Walter Hodgson Bevan Graham (1849–1931), British Royal Navy officer
- Watty Graham (1763–1798), Irish Presbyterian and member of the Society of the United Irishmen
- Wally Graham, Australian rules footballer
