= David Mahoney =

David Mahoney may refer to:

- David Mahoney (soccer) (born 1981), American soccer goalkeeper
- David Mahoney (conductor) (born 1987), British conductor, producer, performer and creative director
- David J. Mahoney (1923–2000), American business leader, philanthropist and author
- Dave Mahoney (1892–1947), Australian rules footballer
