= Frank Lamont =

Australian rules footballer (1886–1963)

Personal information
- Full name: Francis Carlyle Lamont
- Born: 9 August 1886; Ballarat East, Victoria
- Died: 22 July 1963 (aged 76); Heidelberg, Victoria
- Original team: South Ballarat (BFL)
- Height: 164 cm (5 ft 5 in)

Playing career^{1}
Years	Club	Games (Goals)
1911–12	Fitzroy	17 (9)
- ^{1} Playing statistics correct to the end of 1912.

Francis Carlyle Lamont (9 August 1886 – 22 July 1963) was an Australian rules footballer who played with Fitzroy in the Victorian Football League (VFL).

== Family ==
The son of John James Lamont (-1918), and Margaret Ann Lamont (1852-1911), née Carr, Francis Carlyle Lamont was born at Ballarat East, Victoria on 9 August 1886.

He married Sarah Amelia McDiarmid (1888-1972) in 1908.

== Football ==
=== South Ballarat (BFL) ===
Playing for South Ballarat Football Club in the Ballarat Football League, he was selected in a combined Ballarat League team in June 1910.

=== Fitzroy (VFL) ===
Cleared from South Ballarat, he made his debut, as one of the seven new players for Fitzroy — i.e., Ernie Everett, Jack Furness, Cliff Hutton, Frank Lamont, Tom Moloughney, Danny Murphy, and Eric Watson — against Melbourne on 29 April 1911: "The maroons have a star in Lamont, the boy from South Ballarat, playing winning [foot]ball throughout" (Melbourne Punch, 4 May 1911).

=== South Ballarat (BFL) ===
On 5 June 1912, having played in the season's first two matches, he was cleared from Fitzroy back to South Ballarat. In 1915 he was the team's vice-captain.

== Military service ==
He enlisted in the First AIF on 5 July 1915.

He left Australia on 23 November 1915 on HMAT Ceramic (A40), served overseas with the 4th Australian Pioneer Battalion, and returned to Australia on the SS Armagh which left Plymouth on 5 April 1919 and arrived in Melbourne on 18 May 1919.

He was discharged on 27 July 1919.

== Death ==
He died at the Heidelberg Repatriation Hospital on 22 July 1963.
