= Aeroplane Jelly =

Australian confectionery company

- Product type: Confectionery
- Current owner: McCormick Foods Australia
- Country: Australia
- Introduced: 1927
- Markets: Australia
- Tagline: "I like Aeroplane Jelly"
- Website: AeroplaneJelly.com.au

Aeroplane Jelly is a jelly brand in Australia created in 1927 by Bert Appleroth. Appleroth's backyard business, Traders Pty Ltd, became one of Australia's largest family-operated food manufacturers and was sold to McCormick Foods Australia, a subsidiary of United States corporation McCormick & Company, in 1995. Aeroplane Jelly is the market leader in Australia's jelly market, with over 18 million packets sold annually. Strawberry is the best-selling flavour.

Aeroplane Jelly ran a successful advertising campaign featuring a jingle that has become part of Australian culture. It is one of Australia's longest-running jingles, recorded in 1937 featuring the voice of five-year-old Joy King. It was played on radio over 100 times per day in the 1940s. The jingle was added to the National Film and Sound Archive's Sounds of Australia registry in 2008.

== History ==
Adolphus Herbert Frederick Norman Appleroth, known as Bert Appleroth, was a tram conductor who created jelly crystals using gelatine and sugar in his bath. He sold these jelly crystals door-to-door, using his tram route to transport him around Sydney. In 1917, Appleroth rented premises to manufacture his jelly, then formed a company with Albert Francis Lenertz named Traders Pty Ltd in 1927. Planes were considered new and exciting at the time, so aviation fan Appleroth named the brand Aeroplane Jelly. Appleroth used a Tiger Moth plane to make deliveries to rural areas in 1934, and his publicity stunts and Aeroplane Jelly's advertising campaigns made the jelly a national icon, like Holden and Vegemite.

Appleroth's company, Traders Pty Ltd, was run by his son, Bert II, then grandson, Bert III, and ownership passed to Bert III's wife Val when he died in 1985. According to Traders' managing director, Hugh Knox, the Appleroth family were friends with a former managing director of McCormick & Company, which opened up negotiations between the parties. Aeroplane Jelly was sold to McCormick Foods Australia in 1994, the Australian subsidiary of the United States–based McCormick & Company.

After first making jelly at his parent's home in Paddington, the first Aeroplane Jelly factory was located in National Street, Leichhardt, New South Wales, a suburb of Sydney, and then manufactured in West Ryde for 33 years. In 2006, McCormick Foods Australia moved production of Aeroplane Jelly to Clayton, Victoria, to centralise its manufacturing operations in Victoria.

== Advertising ==
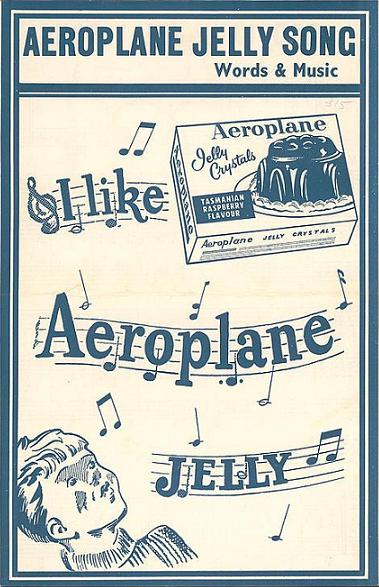
Cover of Aeroplane Jelly sheet music and lyrics

Refrain

The Aeroplane Jelly jingle was composed by Albert Francis Lenertz (1891–1943), Appleroth's business partner. The jingle was a re-working of Lenertz's earlier political jingle in tribute to Australian Prime Minister Billy Hughes. A minor controversy occurred in the Sydney Morning Herald in 1988 over authorship of the song, with claims made on behalf of vaudeville actress Peggy Thorne, pianist of the Musician's Lodge, Les Woods, and New Zealander Bill White.

The jingle was first sung in the early 1930s on the Goodie Reeve radio show by three-year-old Jennifer Paykel. As the commercials were broadcast live, Paykel was taken to the studio two or three times per week to sing the jingle. Paykel's mother did not renew her contract because, according to Paykel, "Shirley Temple was all the rage and my mother was terrified I might become a public figure like her". Aeroplane Jelly held a talent quest in Sydney to find a new singer and the competition was won by five-year-old Joy King. King recorded the jingle in 1937.

A finalist in the same talent quest was seven-year-old Tommy Dawes, who Appleroth chose to appear as the "whistling boy" on the front of the jelly packets and advertising. According to Dawes, as a finalist he received 10 guineas and an onyx inkstand, but has received no other compensation for the use of his image or his recorded version of the jingle. Dawes said, "It was absolutely fantastic; I loved seeing my picture and singing the song and all my friends were very impressed... I have never wanted any money from it... I just like telling everyone that I'm the Aeroplane Jelly boy."

In 1966, the jingle was recorded in Greek, Italian, Russian and Yugoslav, and became one of Australia's first advertising campaigns to target ethnic groups. Versions of the jingle have been recorded by The Andrews Sisters and Victor Borge. At its peak in the 1940s, the jingle was played over 100 times per day on radio stations, and it is one of the longest-running jingles in Australia. In 2003, Aeroplane Jelly marked its 75th anniversary with a national competition to record a new version of the jingle and raise money for the Starlight Children's Foundation. A McCormick spokesperson described the number of submissions as "overwhelming". The competition was won by Queensland's Palm Beach State School, who re-recorded the jingle with runners-up Park Ridge Primary School from Victoria.

Brisbane advertising agencies named the Aeroplane Jelly jingle one of the best and most recognisable advertisement catchphrases of the past 40 years, a runner-up to Mortein's "Louie the Fly" jingle. In June 2008, Joy King's recording of the jingle was added to the National Film and Sound Archive's Sounds of Australia registry.

Bertie the Aeroplane was introduced as Aeroplane Jelly's mascot in 1942. Named after Bert Appleroth, Bertie sung the jingle in cinema advertising. Bertie was later featured in television advertisements and reappeared in 1996 on jelly packaging and the Aeroplane Jelly website.

== Products ==
The Australian jelly industry is worth approximately $1.121 billion per annum, and Aeroplane Jelly is the market leader with a 25% share. Over 19 million packets of Aeroplane Jelly are sold each year. Strawberry flavour is the top-selling jelly variant with nearly 2 million packs sold each year. In 1953, Aeroplane Jelly introduced Australia's first low-calorie jelly. In 1988, in honour of the Australian Bicentenary, jelly was available in special Australian flavours such as Lilly Pilly, Quandong and Midjinberry. These flavours were phased out by 1992. Now Aeroplane Jelly is owned by American company McCormicks foods; it used to be owned by Traders Pty Ltd.
