= Herb Naismith =

Australian rules footballer, born 1915

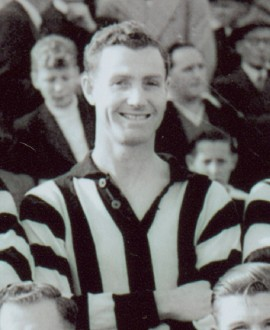
- Naismith during his Collingwood career

Personal information
- Full name: Herbert Walter Naismith
- Born: 9 October 1915; Clifton Hill
- Died: 17 June 1995 (aged 79); Reservoir, Victoria
- Original team: Alphington Amateurs
- Height: 185 cm (6 ft 1 in)
- Weight: 81 kg (179 lb)

Playing career^{1}
Years	Club	Games (Goals)
1938–46	Collingwood	75 (15)
- ^{1} Playing statistics correct to the end of 1946.

Herbert Walter Naismith (9 October 1915 – 17 June 1995) was an Australian rules footballer who played with Collingwood in the Victorian Football League (VFL).

He played cricket for Collingwood Cricket Club, then based at Victoria Park. Between 1930 and 1932 he played 9 first grade fixtures, taking 10 wickets at an average of 34.20.

His father Wally Naismith, paternal uncle Charlie Naismith, maternal uncle Alf Dummett and brother Alby Naismith also played in the VFL.

Naismith also served in the Australian Army during World War II.
