= Cliff Hutton =

Australian rules footballer (1887–1965)

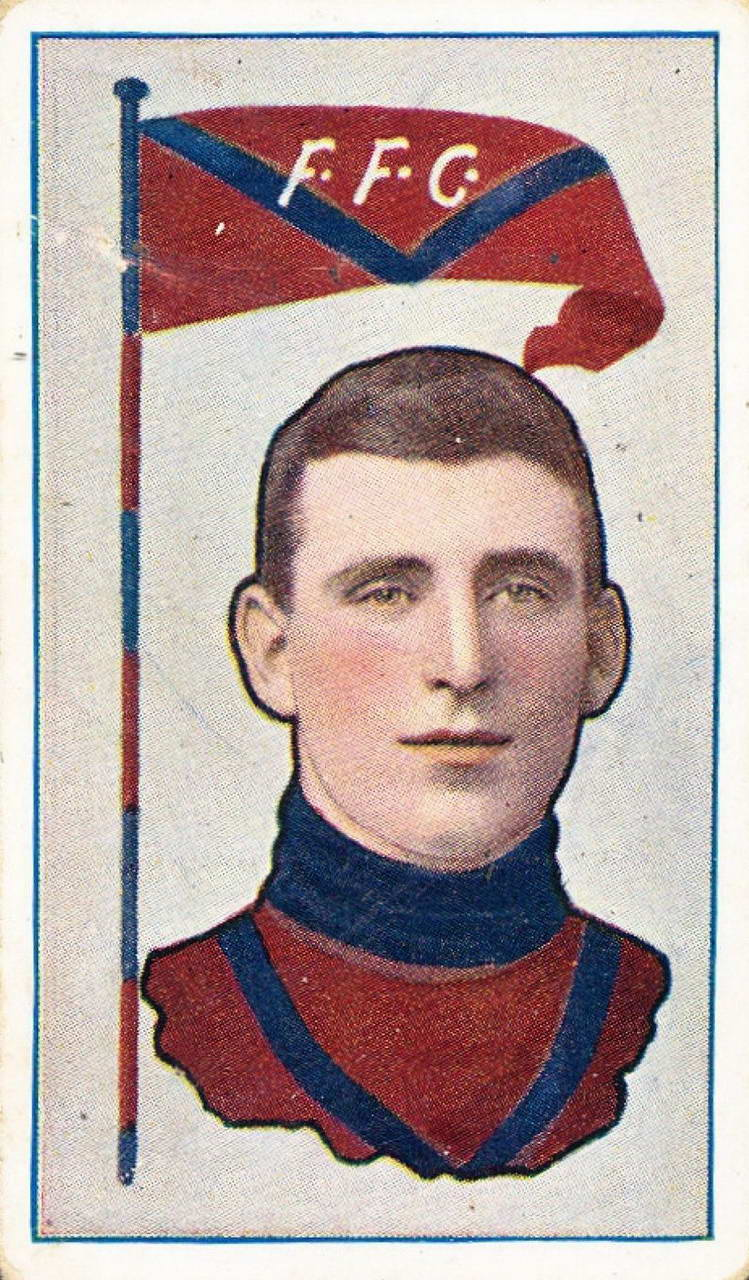
- Cigarette card of Hutton in 1912

Personal information
- Full name: Clifford Charles Hutton
- Born: 27 July 1887; Collingwood, Victoria
- Died: 31 May 1965 (aged 77); Abbotsford, Victoria
- Original team: Northcote (VFA)
- Height: 188 cm (6 ft 2 in)
- Weight: 96 kg (212 lb)
- Position: Ruck

Playing career^{1}
Years	Club	Games (Goals)
1911–12	Fitzroy	34 (7)
1913	Richmond	6 (1)
Total		40 (8)
- ^{1} Playing statistics correct to the end of 1913.

Clifford Charles Hutton (27 July 1887 – 31 May 1965) was an Australian rules footballer who played with Fitzroy and Richmond in the Victorian Football League (VFL).

== Family ==
The son of Frederick Henry Hutton (1851-1894), and Arthena Hutton (1859-1944), née Coulton, Clifford Charles Hutton was born in Collingwood, Victoria on 27 July 1887.

== Football ==
=== Fitzroy (VFL) ===
He made his debut, as one of the seven new players for Fitzroy — i.e., Ernie Everett, Jack Furness, Cliff Hutton, Frank Lamont, Tom Moloughney, Danny Murphy, and Eric Watson — against Melbourne on 29 April 1911.
