= Alby Naismith =

Australian rules footballer (1917–1981)

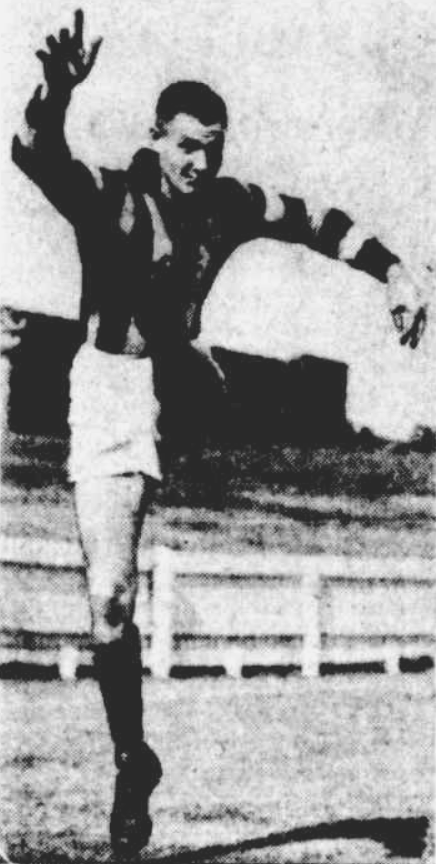

Personal information
- Full name: Albert Henry Naismith
- Born: 13 November 1917; Clifton Hill, Victoria
- Died: 14 June 1981 (aged 63)
- Original team: Alphington
- Height: 183 cm (6 ft 0 in)
- Weight: 81 kg (179 lb)
- Position: Forward

Playing career^{1}
Years	Club	Games (Goals)
1938–1943	Hawthorn	68 (85)
- ^{1} Playing statistics correct to the end of 1943.

Albert Henry Naismith (13 November 1917 – 14 June 1981) was an Australian rules footballer who played with Hawthorn in the Victorian Football League (VFL).

Naismith was a forward, used in the pockets and at centre half-forward. An Alphington recruit, he was the leading goal-kicker for Hawthorn on two occasions, with 30 goals in 1938 and 25 goals in 1940.

His brother Herb Naismith played for Collingwood, as did their maternal uncle Alf Dummett. They were sons of Wally Naismith, a premiership player at Fitzroy (the club where Wally's twin brother Charlie also featured in the VFL).

Naismith later played for Oakleigh, as a full-forward.
