= Ernie Everett =

Australian rules footballer

Personal information
- Full name: Ernest Alfred Everett
- Born: 3 January 1885; Fitzroy, Victoria
- Died: 10 March 1938 (aged 53); Royal Melbourne Hospital, Melbourne
- Original team: Brunswick (VFA)
- Height: 177 cm (5 ft 10 in)
- Weight: 80 kg (176 lb)

Playing career^{1}
Years	Club	Games (Goals)
1911	Fitzroy	3 (0)
- ^{1} Playing statistics correct to the end of 1911.

Ernie Everett (3 January 1885 – 10 March 1938) was an Australian rules footballer who played with Fitzroy in the Victorian Football League (VFL) and Brunswick in the Victorian Football Association.

== Fitzroy (VFL) ==
He made his VFL debut along with Jack Furness, Cliff Hutton, Frank Lamont, Tom Moloughney, Danny Murphy, and Eric Watson — against Melbourne on 29 April 1911.
