= Eric Watson (footballer) =

Australian rules footballer (1893–1971)

Personal information
- Full name: Eric Leslie Watson
- Born: 11 September 1893; Kew, Victoria
- Died: January 1971 (aged 77); Mere, Wiltshire
- Height: 171 cm (5 ft 7 in)

Playing career^{1}
Years	Club	Games (Goals)
1911	Fitzroy	1 (1)
- ^{1} Playing statistics correct to the end of 1911.

Eric Leslie Watson (11 September 1893 – January 1971) was an Australian rules footballer who played with Fitzroy in the Victorian Football League (VFL).

== Fitzroy (VFL) ==
He made his debut, as one of the seven new players for Fitzroy — i.e., Ernie Everett, Jack Furness, Cliff Hutton, Frank Lamont, Tom Moloughney, Danny Murphy, and Eric Watson — against Melbourne on 29 April 1911.
