= Jack Furness =

Australian rules footballer (1890–1968)

Personal information
- Full name: John Robert Furness
- Born: 23 August 1890; North Melbourne, Victoria
- Died: 9 February 1968 (aged 77); Hawthorn, Victoria
- Original team: Fitzroy juniors

Playing career^{1}
Years	Club	Games (Goals)
1911	Fitzroy	6 (3)
- ^{1} Playing statistics correct to the end of 1911.

John Robert Furness (23 August 1890 – 9 February 1968) was an Australian rules footballer who played with Fitzroy in the Victorian Football League (VFL).

== Fitzroy (VFL) ==
He made his debut, as one of the seven new players for Fitzroy — i.e., Ernie Everett, Jack Furness, Cliff Hutton, Frank Lamont, Tom Moloughney, Danny Murphy, and Eric Watson — against Melbourne on 29 April 1911.

== Death ==
He died at Hawthorn, Victoria on 9 February 1968.
