= Goodie Reeve =

English born Australian actress and radio host

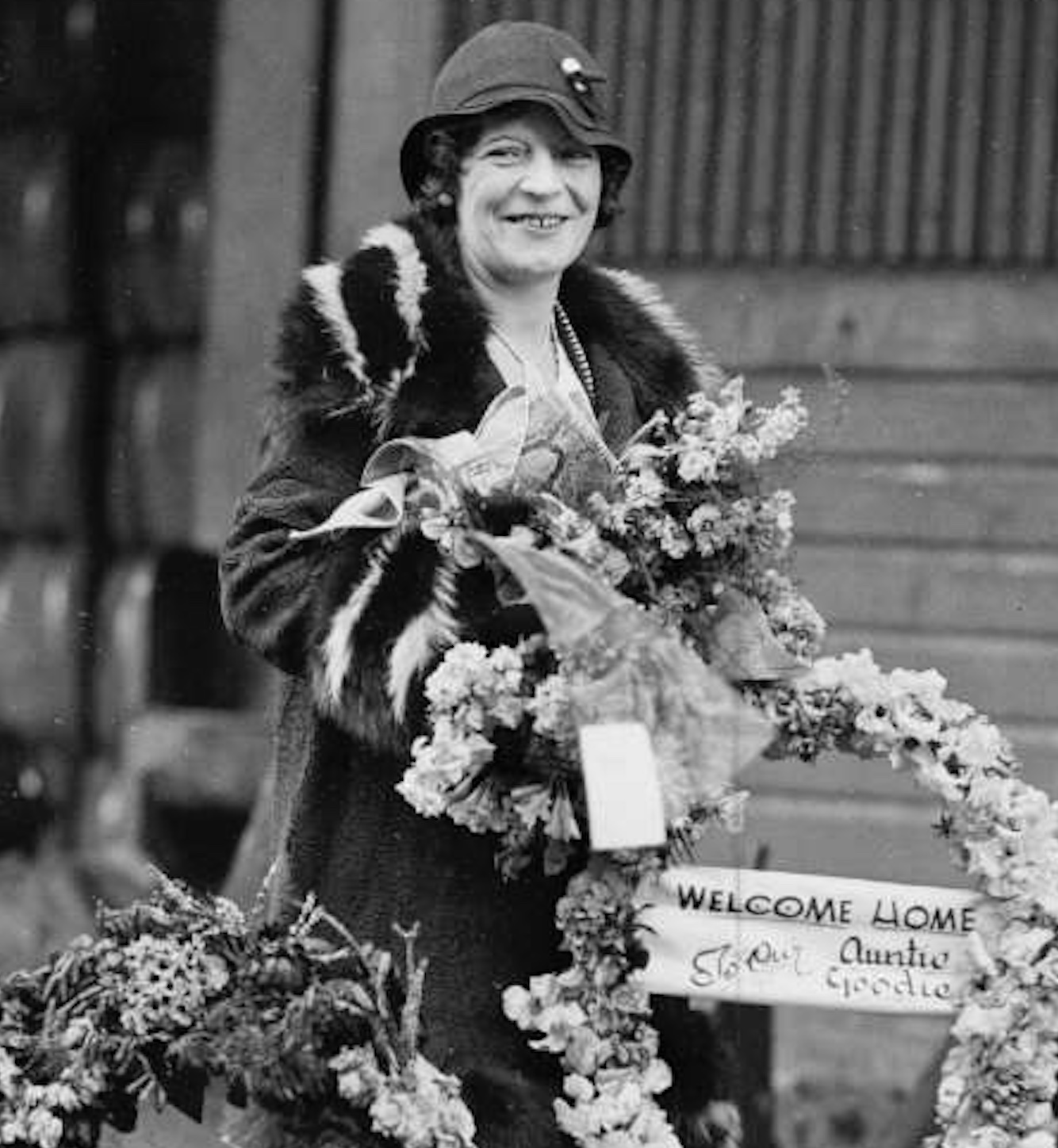
- Born: Lillian Mary Hazlewood; 1897; London, England
- Died: 4 December 1978 (aged 80–81); Brisbane, Australia
- Occupations: Actress, songwriter, radio announcer
- Years active: 1916–1972
- Spouses: Reg McGillicuddy (m. 1919; died 1922) Walter Martin (m. 1932; div. 1948) Paul Dawson (m. 1948; died 1948)
- Children: 1

Goodie Reeve (1897 – 4 December 1978 (Note: There is uncertainty around Reeve's birthdate. An article on Reeve's one-time brother-in-law Cyril McGillicuddy states she was born in 1897 and died in 1978. The author references The Historical Index, Registry of Births, Deaths and Marriages, Department of Justice, Victoria, Reg No 9588, for this claim. However, Reeve's death notice states that she died on 4 December 1978, aged 80.)) was a British-born actor, singer, songwriter, radio host, critic and columnist who found fame in Australia, becoming known as the "First Lady of Sydney Radio".

== Early life ==
Reeve was born Lillian Mary Hazlewood in Warwick Garden, London, the second child of famed comedic actress Ada Reeve and actor Bert Gilbert (Joseph Gilbert Hazlewood); her sister Bessie Hazlewood was also an actress before becoming a chauffeur in Sydney.

Reeve's maternal grandparents Charles Reeve and Harriet Saunders were also actors, and Charles was an active member of the original vigilance committee established to capture Jack the Ripper.

Reeve's paternal grandfather Henry Hazlewood was an actor and theatre manager and her great-grandfather was the playwright Colin Henry Hazlewood.

Following the divorce of Reeve's parents, her mother Ada married Wilfred Cotton, which made Goodie a step-cousin of the actress Lily Elsie.

Reeve's parents regularly toured with their respective acts, sometimes taking Goodie and Bessie with them, including to Australia in 1898 and Southern Africa in 1912.

=== Schooling ===
Reeve began violin lessons while very young, before switching to the piano. Due to her parents' travels, Reeve did not attend school until age ten, initially sent to a convent by her mother in order to learn French, before shifting to a school in Shropshire and then, with her sister, a school in Bonn, Germany, studying music and languages, but was forced to flee when World War I broke out.

Back in England, Reeve studied at the Guildhall School of Music and Drama and following in her parents' footsteps, established herself in musical comedy. In 1916 she appeared in the hit play The Better 'Ole at the Oxford Music Hall in London, initially in the supporting role of "Suzette" before transferring to the lead female role of "Victorine". The Times theatre critic wrote that Reeve helped "brightly and daintily with the song and dance side of the entertainment."

== Australia ==
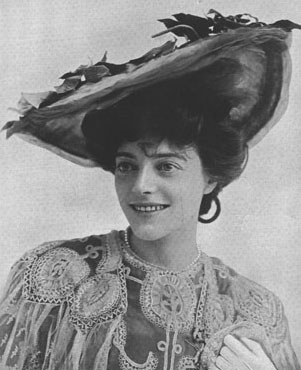
Reeve's mother Ada Reeve

Reeve came to Australia in 1917 for the local production of The Better 'Ole, continuing her role as Victorine. Much of the early media interest in Reeve was related to her famous mother, with critics regularly comparing Goodie to Ada, including claims that Goodie was as skilled as her mother but also having "a quiet charm of her own." Reeve's management capitalised on the connection, billing Goodie as "Famous Ada Reeve's Fascinating Daughter".

Following the end of The Better 'Ole's run in 1919, Reeve spent years appearing on the Tivoli circuit in a solo show, singing and played the piano, including a tour of New Zealand in the 1927/28 summer, and worked in the publicity department of J. C. Williamson's theatre company.

=== Writing ===
Reeve also turned her hand to writing in the early 1920s, becoming the theatre critic for, at various times, The Referee and Arrow before a stint editing Theatre Magazine. She also wrote on a range of other topics, including "women's issues" and the future of education in Australia.

Combining her writing and musical skills, Reeve released Auntie Goodie's Bedtime Story Songs in 1924, an album of self-written children's songs, including "Come To My Island", "Poor Mummy's Tired, Every Night", "The Puppy Dogs' Parade", "I Jus' P'tend", and "It's Lullaby".

Following the release of Auntie Goodie's Bedtime Story Songs, Reeve was hired to write what were the first radio musical commercials in Sydney, including the famous advertising jingle "Eat Your Uncle Toby's Every Day". She also penned and performed "Here Comes Amy", the song sung at the official welcome of aviator Amy Johnson in Sydney on 4 June 1930.

=== Radio ===
Reeve started her 46 year career in radio presenting in Sydney in 1926, working across multiple stations during her career including 2BL, 2FC, 2GB, 2CH, 2SM and 2UE. Reeve was popular among listeners and noted for her "knack of radiating her happy personality at the mike" and ability to bring novel features into radio. By 1932, Reeve was known as "one of the best woman announcers on the air" with "a large army of listeners" following her across to 2SM.

Reeve initially hosted radio programmes for children, including Children's Session, Chickabiddies and Tiny Tots. A typical episode was described as Reeve singing a song she had written while accompanying herself on the piano, before explaining the song or telling a story to the child listener, while continuing to play the piano. Most of her songs and stories were impromptu, although Reeve would eventually hire writers, like Kylie Tennant, who got her big break writing plays for Reeve's children programme, while the iconic Aeroplane Jelly jingle was first sung on one of Reeve's shows.

Reeve's ability to build relationships with young listeners led to her becoming known as "Auntie Goodie" and someone that children would listen to, which she put to use in her 1930 Christmas message on 2GB, urging listeners to "specially appreciate your presents this year, because most Mummies and Daddies have not had too many pennies to spend".

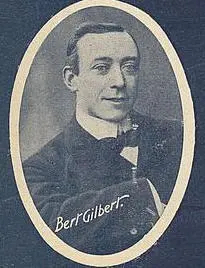
Reeve's father Bert Gilbert appeared on Reeve's Behind the scenes at Hollywood program

Proving to be a popular radio host, Reeve branched out to different programme genres, including women's interests, Auntie Goodie's Good Deeds, where listeners would write in with stories of acts of kindness, and entertainment, with Behind the scenes at Hollywood on 2FC, featuring actors, including her own father, speaking about their life and career.

It was in this role that Reeve inadvertently performed the first interview on the ABC, when a visiting actor froze during a talk and Reeve resorted to asking questions to encourage him to speak.

In 1937 Reeve launched the For Men Only programme on 2GB, encouraging men to write to her about their personal issues, including complaints about their wives, loneliness or lack of employment. Reeve read out the letters and responded, providing advice and organising support when required.

Such was Reeve's popularity in the 1930s, she was called "perhaps the greatest favourite in the air in Australia to-day", to the point that a letter from the UK addressed "Goodie Reeve, Sydney" found her.

However, Reeve's popularity had its drawbacks, including death threats and Christmas cakes containing screws, needles and other objects sent to her. to a listener travelling hundreds of kilometres to personally lecture her on the benefits of using a parrot to rub face creams on ones face.

After World War II, Reeve ran the popular 2GB programme Session for the Blind, that included a backing band of blind musicians and an emphasis on helping blind ex-serviceman. Critics praised Reeve's work on Session for the Blind, stating in her "quiet, pleasant way, has deservedly achieved some remarkable results from her cheerful little programme."

== Personal life ==
Described as "of the pale face and the experienced grey eyes, and the lips which seem to form ideas instead of words", Reeve had a distant relationship with her mother, who appeared to prefer working to motherhood or family life. The two did not see each other for the last thirty seven years of Ada's life, although Reeve recorded a tribute to her mother when Ada was the subject of a This is your life episode.

In 1926 Reeve became seriously ill and by 1929 had undergone 20 operations on her head. It was later suggested that Reeve's well known "extraordinarily sympathetic nature", partly derived from this illness and her desire to spread kindness in the world as a result, including her ongoing charity work, in particular for the Royal Society for the Blind.

=== Marriages ===
Reeve was married three times:

The first to Dr Reg McGillicuddy, a physician and former Australian rules footballer with Victorian Football League (VFL) club University, at St Patrick's Cathedral, Melbourne, on 5 December 1919. Reeve left the Sydney run of My Lady Frayle, in which she played a leading role, at short notice, to travel to Melbourne to wed McGillicuddy. Reeve was replaced by her understudy Trilby Clark.

The couple moved to Queensland where they had a daughter, Patricia Mary "Yuki", before McGillicuddy died in Cunnamulla in 1922, aged 30. Reeve was in Sydney visiting her father when she heard of McGillicuddy's illness but he died before Reeve was able to return to Cunnamulla.

Reeve and her daughter returned to Sydney where Yuki attended Normanhurst Convent.

Reeve's second marriage was to Walter Geoffrey Martin, an executive with Amalgamated Wireless, in St Mary's Cathedral, Sydney on 22 October 1932, followed by a honeymoon in Suva, Fiji. Up to 400 fans were outside St Mary's, throwing rose petals and mobbing Reeve, leading to near suffocations in the resulting crush and many children screaming in fright. Reeve stopped to kiss and calm many of the children present and momentarily lost her gold plaited headwear.

Following the wedding, Reeve spent a year away from the airwaves but due to her ongoing popularity she remained one of the best known personalities in Australian radio throughout her break.

Reeve later stated that Martin left her within three months of the wedding.

The third was to Australian Army Major Paul Frederick Dawson on 21 October 1948. Dawson, who had served with the New South Wales Lines of Communication Unit in World War II, was critically ill from injuries sustained from the war, and died less than a month later, on 16 November 1946.

As Reeve married Dawson only three hours after her decree nisi for divorce from her second husband Walter Martin was made absolute on 21 October 1946, there was confusion over the validity of the marriage.

Under Australian law of the time, remarriage was forbidden within 21 days of the granting of a decree nisi. As Dawson's wife, Reeve would be entitled to Dawson's estate and war pension, and the case went before the court which ruled that the marriage was invalid.

Although not eligible for a widow's war pension, as the sole beneficiary of Dawson's will, Reeve inherited his estate valued at £258 (the equivalent of $AUD40959 in 2022). Reeve continued to refer to herself as "Mrs Dawson" after the court case.

Additionally, it was reported in early 1919 that Reeve had become engaged to British humourist Bruce Bairnsfather, and that they would marry when Bairnsfather came to Australia later that year. However, Bairnsfather was too ill to undertake travel.

=== Retirement ===
Following her retirement from radio in 1972, Reeve moved to Queensland, where she died in a Springfield nursing home on 4 December 1978, aged 80. She was survived by her daughter and two grandchildren.

== Sources ==
- Clark, N. (2022) A dog for the job, Inspiring Publishers: Canberra. ISBN 9781922792433.
- Fisher, C. (2021) Sound Citizens: Australian Women Broadcasters Claim their Voice, 1923–1956, ANU Press: Canberra. ISBN 9781760464318.
- Griffen-Foley, B. (2020) Australian Radio Listeners and Television Viewers, Palgrave MacMillan: Sydney. ISBN 9783030546366.
- Ledger, E. (1915) The Era Annual, Open Court: London.
- National Board of Review of Motion Pictures (1979) Films in Review, vol. 30, National Board of Review of Motion Pictures: Washington, US.
- Snell, K. (1991) Australian Popular Music Composer Index, Quick Trick Press: Melbourne. ISBN 9780958767767.
