= Danny Murphy (Australian footballer, born 1884) =

Australian rules footballer (1884–1956)

Personal information
- Full name: Daniel Denis Murphy
- Born: 22 February 1884; Footscray, Melbourne
- Died: 1 November 1956 (aged 72); Kew, Melbourne
- Height: 175 cm (5 ft 9 in)
- Weight: 78 kg (172 lb)

Playing career^{1}
| Years | Club | Games (Goals) |
| 1911 | Fitzroy | 1 (0) |
- ^{1} Playing statistics correct to the end of 1911.

Danny Murphy (22 February 1884 – 1 November 1956) was an Australian rules footballer who played with Fitzroy in the Victorian Football League (VFL).

== Fitzroy (VFL) ==
He made his debut, as one of the seven new players for Fitzroy — i.e., Ernie Everett, Jack Furness, Cliff Hutton, Frank Lamont, Tom Moloughney, Danny Murphy, and Eric Watson — against Melbourne on 29 April 1911.
