= William Hickey =

William Hickey may refer to:

- William Hickey (actor) (1927–1997), American actor
- William Hickey (basketball) (born 1999), Australian basketball player
- William Hickey (columnist), pseudonymous byline for a column in the Daily Express
- William Hickey (memoirist) (1749–1830), English lawyer and author of a famous set of memoirs
- William Hickey (writer) (1787–1875), Irish philanthropist
- William J. Hickey (1873–1953), New York politician and judge
- William A. Hickey (1869–1933), American prelate of the Roman Catholic Church
- William F. Hickey Jr., (1929–2016), Connecticut politician and judge
- Will Hickey, Irish rugby union player

== See also ==
- Bill Hickey
