= Ada Reeve =

English stage and film actress (1874–1966)

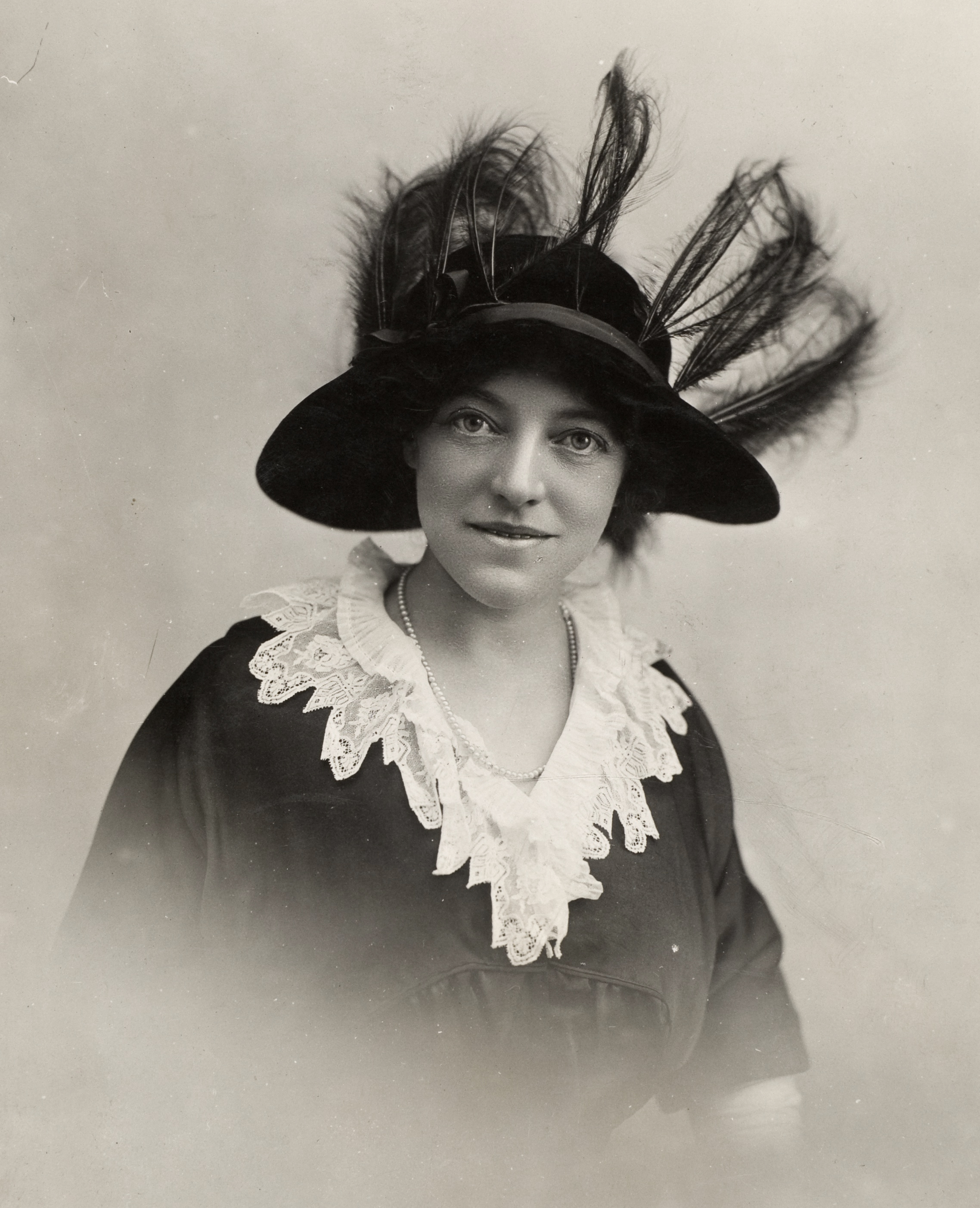
- Born: Adelaide Mary Reeves; 3 March 1874; London, England
- Died: 5 October 1966 (aged 92); London, England
- Occupation: Actress
- Years active: 1878–1957
- Spouses: Bert Gilbert (m. 1894; div. 1900) Wilfred Cotton (m. 1902)
- Children: 2, including Goodie Reeve

Ada Reeve (born Adelaide Mary Reeves; 3 March 1874 – 5 October 1966) was an English actress of both stage and film. Reeve began to perform in pantomime and music hall as a child. She gained fame in Edwardian musical comedies in the 1890s.

Reeve found considerable success on tour in Australia, South Africa, America and other places in pantomime, variety and vaudeville in the new century. At the age of 70 she began a film career, which she pursued for over a dozen years.

== Early career ==
Adelaide Mary Reeves was born in London on 3 March 1874. Her father was Samuel Isaacs, an actor who changed his name to Charles Reeves, and her mother was Harriet Reeves (née Seaman), a dancer. She was of Jewish descent. She made her first appearance on the stage at the age of four in the pantomime Red Riding Hood on Boxing Day 1878 at the Pavilion Theatre, Whitechapel and continued to play in pantomimes. As a young child, she toured for several years with the Frederick Wright Dramatic Company, performing with the young Huntley Wright and his family. Her first role with them was "Little Willie" in East Lynne. A series of pantomime and dramatic roles followed, many at the Pavilion. The touring company the family worked for went bankrupt in 1888 and the large family was reduced to singing on the beach to keep the family fed. When she was 14 years old, Reeve's father's health failed, and she was left to support her family, so she began working as a music hall performer, finding immediate success. As a child, she performed under the name "Little Ada Reeves", but she shortened her surname to Reeve by 1886.

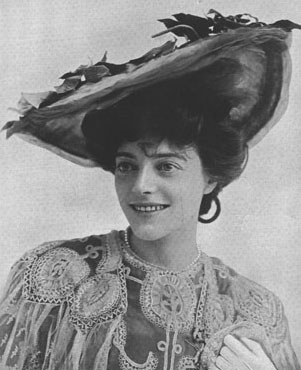
Reeve in The Medal and the Maid (1903)

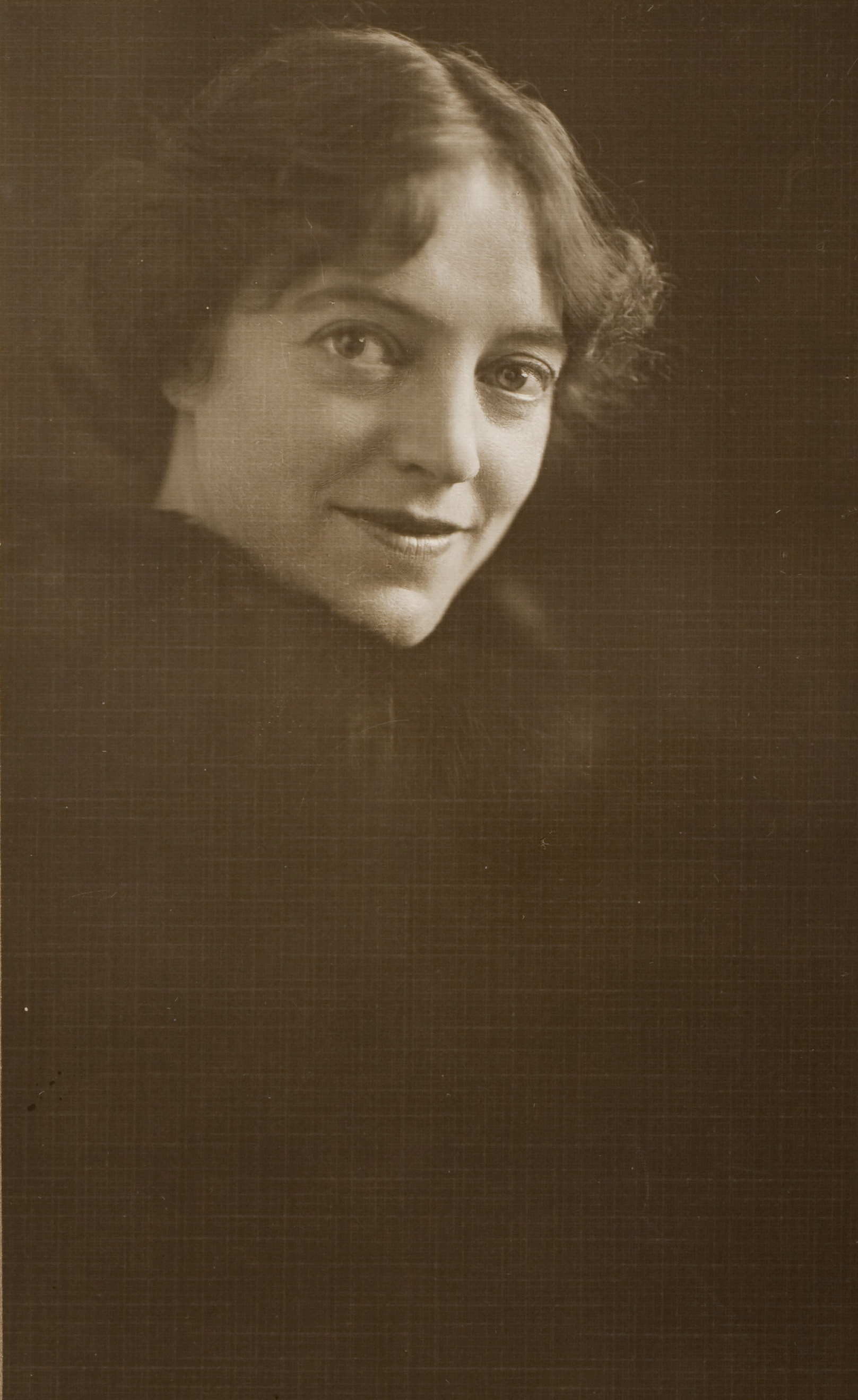
Ada Reeve (1874 - 1966), Sydney, 1910-1913

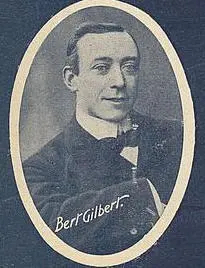
Bert Gilbert, Reeve's first husband

"She Was a Clergyman's Daughter" (see illustration) was a seemingly innocent, but actually risqué music hall song about a clergyman's daughter who was not as naive or charitable as she would have you imagine. Reeve performed the song in a demure costume of a flounced dress and bonnet, letting the audience in on the racy innuendos of the song through knowing winks and gestures. She continued to perform in pantomimes, being promoted to principal boy in 1891 in The Old Bogie of the Sea at the Britannia Theatre and playing the title role in Aladdin at the Prince of Wales's Theatre, Birmingham, in 1892, where she sang her hit song "What Do I Care?" In 1893, she played Bo-Peep in Bo-Peep and Bonnie Boy Blue at the same theatre.

Reeve married actor Bert Gilbert (Joseph Gilbert Hazlewood) in 1894, and returned to starring in provincial pantomimes and touring as Haidee in Don Juan. She soon became known for her role in one of George Edwardes' earliest musical comedies at the Gaiety Theatre, starring as Bessie Brent, the title role in The Shop Girl (1894) opposite Seymour Hicks. She was pregnant, however, and had to be replaced in the role by Hicks' wife, Ellaline Terriss. She returned in All Abroad at the Criterion Theatre (1895), and as the title character in The Gay Parisienne at the Duke of York's Theatre (1896). She and her husband then toured Australia in 1897 with J. C. Williamson in 1897–98. She starred as Robin Hood and later Maid Marion in Williamson's pantomime Babes in the Wood, drawing popular and critical praise. However, the marriage with Gilbert had turned sour, with Reeve claiming extreme cruelty and petitioning for divorce while still in Australia. On the return sea journey to Britain, Reeve was forced to appeal to the captain of the ship for protection from him. Once in England, the couple separated, and the divorce was finalised in 1900. Ada settled in London with her two daughters, Bessie Adelaide Hazlewood (b. 28 March 1895 in Wolverhampton) and Lillian Mary "Goodie" Hazlewood (b. Jan 1897 in London).

Still in 1898, Reeve played the role of "Madame Celeste" in Milord, Sir Smith, followed by the role of Cleopatra in The Great Caesar in 1899. Later that year, she created the role of Lady Holyrood in the musical comedy Florodora at the Lyric Theatre. She reprised her role as principal boy in Aladdin at the Prince's Theatre, Bristol, over Christmas 1899–1900. In 1900–01, she again toured Australia, returning to Britain to tour in Florodora. Reeve joined the cast of the hit musical San Toy, in 1901, playing Dudley and later taking over the title role from Marie Tempest. The music was transcribed down for Reeve's lower voice. Late in the year, she succeeded Evie Greene in the title role of Kitty Grey, followed by Ada Branscombe in Three Little Maids, in 1902. In between these engagements, she continued to play in pantomime, which she enjoyed very much, often as Aladdin.

== Later years ==
Reeve remarried in 1902 to Wilfred Cotton, a manager and actor who was the uncle of Lily Elsie. That year, she leased the Eden Theatre, Brighton, on behalf of her new husband. However, she caught typhoid fever on a trip to Germany and consequently was too ill to perform that Christmas. Under her husband's management, in 1903, she played Miss Ventnor in The Medal and the Maid. Next, in 1904, she co-produced with her husband, and played the title role in, the play Winnie Brooke, Widow. In 1905, she played the title role in The Adventures of Moll on tour and appeared in Birmingham again as Aladdin in the Christmas pantomime. In 1906, Reeve toured South Africa with her husband, becoming very popular. Back in England, she appeared at the Tivoli and Empire theatres and on tour and, in 1908, played Rhodanthe in the musical Butterflies at the Apollo Theatre, which she produced. In 1909, they toured South Africa again and then toured Butterflies in Britain. She played the title role in the 'Christmas 1908 and 1909 pantomimes of Jack and the Beanstalk, with George Robey as her stage mother.

Over the following years, Reeve played in variety in England and enjoyed extensive and lucrative foreign tours, including South Africa and the U.S. in 1911, South Africa in 1913, Australia in 1914, Australia and South Africa in 1917–1918 (including a return engagement at the Tivoli in Melbourne in You're in Love), South Africa in 1920, Australia and New Zealand from 1922 to 1924 (again often in Aladdin with the Williamson company), and in 1926 and 1929, the last time playing in vaudeville. She was absent from England from 1929 to 1935. In Australia in 1932, she starred in short films produced by Efftee Studios, including two in the "Efftee Entertainers" series of films of variety acts from the local stage. The most notable of her Efftee films is In the Future (1932), a twelve-minute play that Reeve co-directed with F. W. Thring. The film's central premise is a reversal of traditional gender roles, in which Reeve plays a domineering wife who smokes a cigar and departs for her club while her husband sits at home embroidering. Both of Reeve's daughters, Bessie and Goody, had settled in Australia, where both married and had children, Goody becoming a well known radio personality. Bessie died of an illness in 1954. Upon Ada's return to England, she appeared in cabarets, revues and variety. Her next dramatic role was in 1940 in the musical Black Velvet.

After a few more years on stage, in 1944 Reeve began appearing in films as Mrs. Barley in They Came to a City. She appeared in a total of nine movies and continued her stage work in the 1940s and 1950s. At the age of 80, she retired from the stage but made two more films, the last of which was at the age of 83 in The Passionate Stranger in 1957.

She was the subject of This Is Your Life in 1956 when she was surprised by Eamonn Andrews at the King's Theatre, Hammersmith, London.

Ada Reeve died in 1966 at the age of 92.

== Filmography ==
Year	Title	Role	Notes
1919	Comradeship	Betty Mortimore	
1932	In the Future	May	
1944	They Came to a City	Mrs. Batley	
1947	Meet Me at Dawn	Concierge	
1947	When the Bough Breaks	2nd Landlady	
1949	Dear Mr. Prohack	Mrs. Griggs	
1950	Night and the City	Molly	
1952	I Believe in You	Mrs. Crockett	
1953	Time Bomb	Old Lady	Uncredited
1956	Eyewitness	Mrs. Hudson	
1957	The Passionate Stranger	Old Woman	
