= Billy Holmes (Australian footballer) =

Australian rules footballer

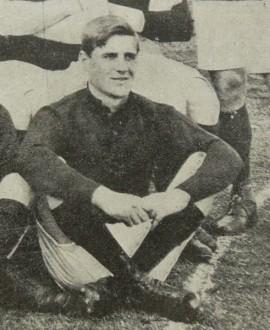
- Holmes in 1912

Personal information
- Full name: William Frederick Holmes
- Born: 26 January 1890; Eaglehawk, Victoria
- Died: 11 October 1942 (aged 52); Prahran, Victoria
- Original team: California Gully
- Height: 175 cm (5 ft 9 in)
- Weight: 77 kg (170 lb)

Playing career^{1}
Years	Club	Games (Goals)
1911	Collingwood	1 (0)
1912	Fitzroy	16 (11)
Total		17 (11)
- ^{1} Playing statistics correct to the end of 1912.

William Frederick Holmes (26 January 1890 – 11 October 1942) was an Australian rules footballer who played with Collingwood and Fitzroy in the Victorian Football League (VFL).
