= Billy Hammond =

Australian rules footballer

Personal information
- Full name: William Hammond
- Born: 25 October 1887; Collingwood, Victoria
- Died: 16 February 1919 (aged 31); Melbourne, Victoria
- Original team: Collingwood District
- Height: 178 cm (5 ft 10 in)
- Weight: 82 kg (181 lb)

Playing career^{1}
Years	Club	Games (Goals)
1911	Collingwood	4 (1)
- ^{1} Playing statistics correct to the end of 1911.

William Hammond (25 October 1887 – 16 February 1919), nicknamed "Chock", was an Australian rules footballer who played with Collingwood in the Victorian Football League (VFL).

== Family ==
The son of Thomas Hammond, and Ann Hammond, née Williams, Billy Hammond was born on 25 October 1887. Two of his brothers, Jack Hammond (1884-1971), and Charlie Hammond (1886-1936) also played VFL football.

He married Ellen Irvine in 1911.

== Death ==
He died as an inpatient at the Melbourne's special "Spanish flu" hospital that had been set up in the Royal Exhibition Building on 16 February 1919.
