= Ned Bowen =

Australian rules footballer

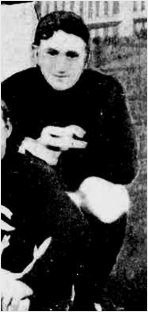
- Bowen during his Carlton career

Personal information
- Full name: Edward Joseph Bowen
- Born: 12 August 1889; Katandra, Victoria
- Died: 2 December 1933 (aged 44); Elwood, Victoria
- Original team: Port Melbourne Juniors (VFA)
- Height: 180 cm (5 ft 11 in)
- Weight: 79.5 kg (175 lb)

Playing career^{1}
Years	Club	Games (Goals)
1911–12	Carlton	28 (14)
1913	St Kilda	2 (0)
Total		30 (14)
- ^{1} Playing statistics correct to the end of 1913.

Edward Joseph Bowen (12 August 1889 – 2 December 1933) was an Australian rules footballer who played with Carlton and St Kilda in the Victorian Football League (VFL).
