= Billy Dick =

Australian rules footballer (1889–1960)

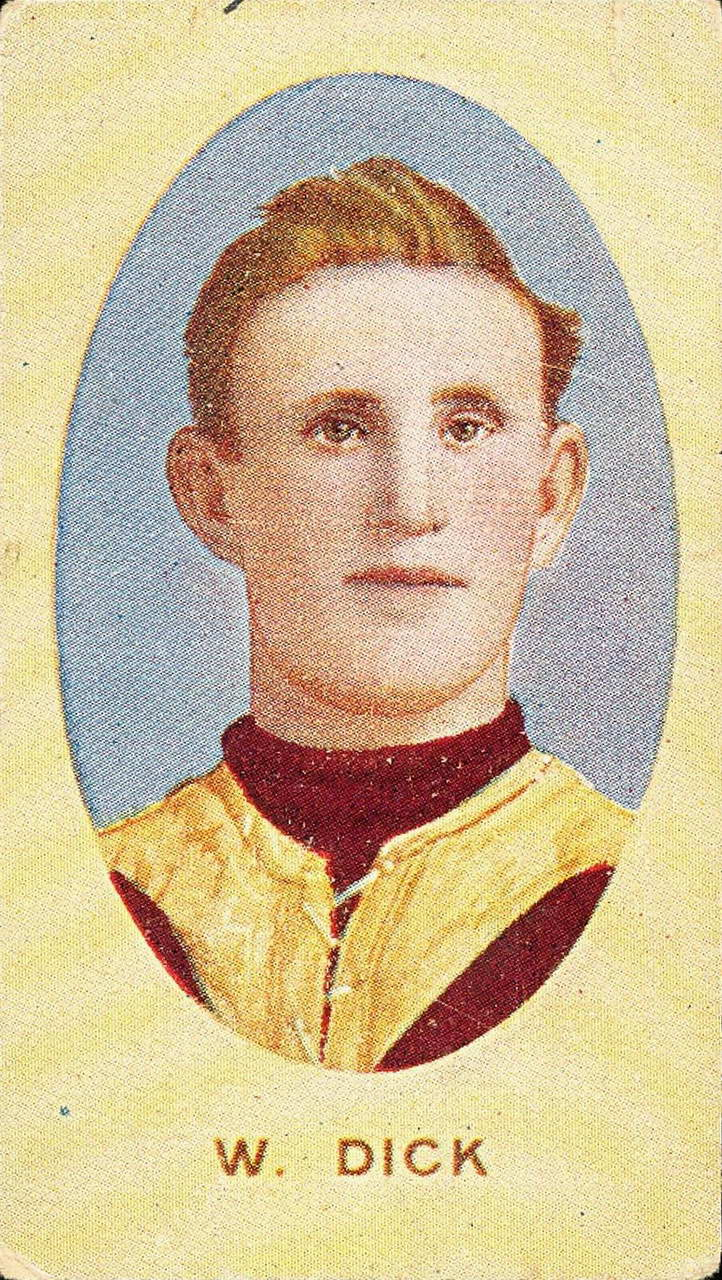
- Cigarette card of Dick in 1910

Personal information
- Full name: William John Dick
- Born: 16 July 1889; Stawell, Victoria
- Died: 18 November 1960 (aged 71); Cheltenham, Victoria
- Original team: East Brunswick
- Height: 179 cm (5 ft 10 in)
- Weight: 77 kg (170 lb)
- Positions: Centre half-forward, centre half-back

Playing career^{1}
Years	Club	Games (Goals)
1906–07	Brighton	?? (??)
1908–10	Fitzroy	53 (40)
1911–18	Carlton	100 (35)
1919	Brunswick	5 (3)
- ^{1} Playing statistics correct to the end of 1919.

Career highlights
- Fitzroy leading goalkicker 1909; Carlton captain 1914–17; Carlton premiership side 1914; Carlton leading goalkicker 1917

William John Dick (16 July 1889 – 18 November 1960) was an Australian rules footballer who played for Fitzroy and Carlton in the Victorian Football League (VFL).

Dick also played for the Carlton Cricket Club, averaging over 50 runs an inning through 31 March of the 1911 season.

== Family ==
He was the nephew of Alick Dick, who captained the Brighton cricket team and later was captain of Essendon in the VFA.

His nephews Ian and Alexander Dick played first-class cricket for Western Australia, with Ian also captaining Australia in the field hockey tournament at the 1956 Summer Olympics in Melbourne.

== Football ==
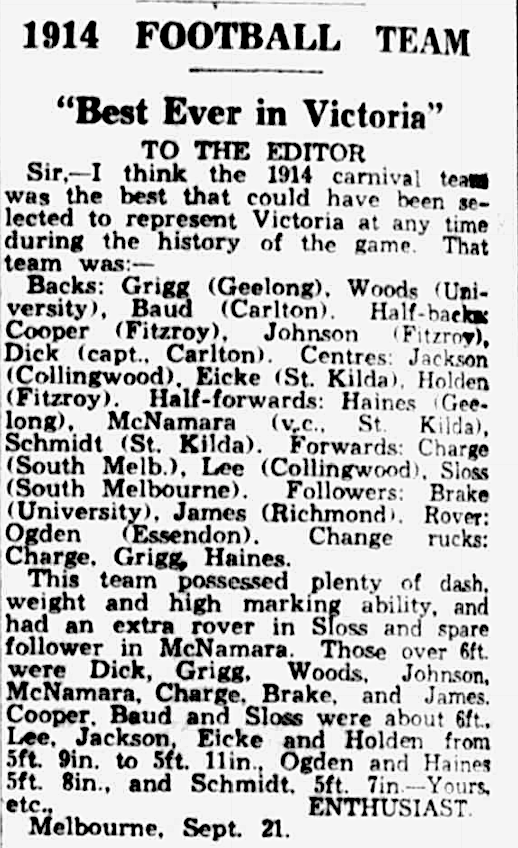
Enthusiast's Letter to the Editor The Herald, 21 September 1934.

Dick made his debut for Carlton in round 6 of the 1911 VFL season.

Midway though the 1915 season, on June 26 against Fitzroy, Dick was reported for striking Jack Cooper and subsequently suspended for ten matches. Carlton took legal advice, but the league upheld the suspension against the club's appeal. Alf Baud took over as team captain to replace the suspended Dick.

He left Carlton at the end of 1918 and played for Brunswick in 1919.

== See also ==
- 1914 Sydney Carnival
