= Vic Gordon (footballer) =

Australian rules footballer

Personal information
- Full name: Victor Bass Forsyth Gordon
- Born: 9 November 1890; Oakleigh, Victoria
- Died: 11 August 1981 (aged 90); Brighton, Victoria
- Original team: Hawthorn (VFA)
- Height: 183 cm (6 ft 0 in)
- Weight: 73 kg (161 lb)
- Position: Ruck / Forward

Playing career^{1}
Years	Club	Games (Goals)
1911	St Kilda	3 (0)
1914	Melbourne	15 (4)
1915	Carlton	1 (0)
Total		19 (4)
- ^{1} Playing statistics correct to the end of 1915.

Victor Bass Forsyth Gordon (9 November 1890 – 11 August 1981) was an Australian rules footballer who played with St Kilda, Melbourne and Carlton in the Victorian Football League (VFL).
