= Tom Hanson (Australian footballer) =

Australian rules footballer

Personal information
- Full name: Thomas Bucknell Hanson
- Born: 2 July 1891; St Kilda, Victoria
- Died: 27 December 1986 (aged 95); Macleod, Victoria
- Original team: Grosvenor
- Height: 178 cm (5 ft 10 in)
- Weight: 75.5 kg (166 lb)

Playing career^{1}
Years	Club	Games (Goals)
1911	Carlton	1 (0)
- ^{1} Playing statistics correct to the end of 1911.

Thomas Bucknell Hanson (2 July 1891 – 27 December 1986) was an Australian rules footballer who played with Carlton in the Victorian Football League (VFL).
