= Albert Biggs =

Australian rules footballer (1889–1954)

Personal information
- Full name: Albert George Silvanus Biggs
- Born: 24 May 1889; Bendigo, Victoria
- Died: 4 April 1954 (aged 64); Yarraville, Victoria
- Original team: Sandhurst Juniors

Playing career^{1}
Years	Club	Games (Goals)
1911	St Kilda	2 (0)
- ^{1} Playing statistics correct to the end of 1911.

Albert George Silvanus Biggs (24 May 1889 – 4 April 1954) was an Australian rules footballer who played for the St Kilda Football Club in the Victorian Football League (VFL).
