= Charles Suhr =

Australian rules footballer (1885–1930)

Personal information
- Full name: Charles Thomas Suhr
- Born: 9 July 1885; Glenlyon, Victoria
- Died: 6 May 1930 (aged 44); South Yarra, Victoria
- Original team: Caulfield City

Playing career^{1}
Years	Club	Games (Goals)
1906	Melbourne	1 (0)
1911	St Kilda	1 (0)
Total		2 (0)
- ^{1} Playing statistics correct to the end of 1911.

Charles Thomas Suhr (9 July 1885 – 6 May 1930) was an Australian rules footballer who played with Melbourne and St Kilda in the Victorian Football League (VFL).
