= Tom O'Brien (footballer, born 1889) =

Australian rules footballer

Personal information
- Full name: Thompson Joseph O'Brien
- Born: 11 October 1889; Adelong, New South Wales
- Died: 11 September 1963 (aged 73); Wagga Wagga
- Original team: Xavier College

Playing career^{1}
Years	Club	Games (Goals)
1909–10	University	3 (3)
- ^{1} Playing statistics correct to the end of 1910.

Thompson Joseph "Tom" O'Brien (11 October 1889 – 11 September 1963) was an Australian rules footballer who played with University in the Victorian Football League (VFL).

== Sources ==
- Holmesby, Russell & Main, Jim (2007). The Encyclopedia of AFL Footballers. 7th ed. Melbourne: Bas Publishing.
- Tom O'Brien's playing statistics from AFL Tables
- Tom O'Brien at AustralianFootball.com
