= Bill Patterson (footballer, born 1888) =

Australian rules footballer

Personal information
- Full name: William George Patterson
- Born: 15 September 1888; Noorat, Victoria
- Died: 17 September 1956 (aged 68); Warrnambool, Victoria

Playing career^{1}
Years	Club	Games (Goals)
1911–1912	St Kilda	11 (0)

Coaching career
Years	Club	Games (W–L–D)
1938	St Kilda	1 (0–1–0)
- ^{1} Playing statistics correct to the end of 1912.

William Patterson (15 September 1888 – 17 September 1956) was an Australian rules footballer who played for the St Kilda Football Club in the Victorian Football League (VFL).

Patterson made 11 appearances for St Kilda, with the only win coming against University. Following his retirement from football, Patterson became head trainer of St Kilda and during the 1938 VFL season he took over from Ansell Clarke as coach of St Kilda for a game against North Melbourne at Arden Street. St Kilda lost 12.11 (83) to 7.15 (57).
