= Tom Martin (Australian footballer) =

Australian rules footballer

Personal information
- Full name: Thomas Henry Martin
- Born: 17 November 1888; Drysdale, Victoria
- Died: 30 January 1949 (aged 60); Windsor, Victoria
- Height: 175 cm (5 ft 9 in)
- Weight: 79 kg (174 lb)

Playing career^{1}
Years	Club	Games (Goals)
1911	Geelong	5 (5)
- ^{1} Playing statistics correct to the end of 1911.

Thomas Henry Martin (17 November 1888 – 30 January 1949) was an Australian rules footballer who played with Geelong in the Victorian Football League (VFL).
