= Charlie Hammond =

Australian rules footballer (1886–1936)

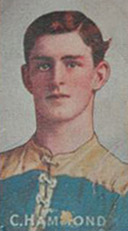

Personal information
- Full name: Charles Hammond
- Born: 19 March 1886; Collingwood, Victoria
- Died: 4 December 1936 (aged 50); Clifton Hill, Victoria
- Original team: Northcote (MJFA)
- Debut: Round 1, 1905, Carlton vs. Essendon, at Princes Park
- Height: 178 cm (5 ft 10 in)
- Weight: 86 kg (190 lb)

Playing career^{1}
Years	Club	Games (Goals)
1905–1909	Carlton	92 (19)
1910–1911	North Melbourne (VFA)	19 (10)
1912	Northcote (VFA)	15 (3)
1914–1918	Carlton	62 (21)
Total		188 (53)
- ^{1} Playing statistics correct to the end of 1918.

Charles William Hammond (19 March 1886 – 4 December 1936) was an Australian rules footballer who played with the Carlton Football Club in the Victorian Football League (VFL). Hammond is notable as the only footballer in history to play in five Carlton premiership sides.

== Family ==
The son of Thomas Hammond, and Ann Hammond, née Williams, Charles William Hammond was born at Collingwood, Victoria on 19 March 1886. One of his brothers, Jack Hammond (1884–1971), played VFL football for Carlton and Melbourne; and another, Billy Hammond (1887–1919), played VFL football for Collingwood.

He married Elsie May Allport (1885–1939) in 1910.

== Football ==
Hammond originally played for the Northcote Football Club in the Metropolitan Junior Football Association (MJFA).

=== Carlton (VFL) ===
In 1905, he was recruited to the Carlton Football Club in the VFL, and made his debut in the opening game of the 1905 season, against Essendon on 6 May 1905.

He played as a defender during his early days at the club but soon established himself as an excellent ruck shepherd. Hammond was a premiership player for Carlton in three successive seasons from 1906 to 1908.

=== North Melbourne (VFA) ===
In 1910, he was one of a group of players who left Carlton in protest over the sacking of coach Jack Worrall.

On 27 April 1910 he was granted a permit to play for the VFA team North Melbourne. He played in 19 games, and scored 19 goals for North Melbourne in 1910, as well as playing in its 1910 premiership team.

He also played for North Melbourne in 1911, missing out on the (losing) semi-final match against Brunswick due to injury (he had dislocated his shoulder in the 19 August match against Essendon A).

=== Northcote (VFA) ===
He was cleared from North Melbourne to play with Northcote on 8 May 1912. His first match for Northcote was against Prahran on 11 May 1912; and he played a total of 15 games for the club in 1912.

His application for a clearance from Northcote to Carlton was refused in June 1913; and there is no record of him playing football anywhere in 1913.

=== Carlton (VFL) ===
Cleared from Northcote on 15 April 1914, Hammond returned to Carlton in 1914, where he played for a further five seasons. Hammond was part of two more premiership teams at Carlton, in 1914 and 1915. He remains the only player to have won five premierships with the Carlton Football Club. He retired at the end of 1918.

== Death ==
He died at his residence in Clifton Hill, Victoria on 4 December 1936.
