= Bill McKeone =

Australian rules footballer

Personal information
- Full name: William McKeone
- Born: 18 February 1889; Richmond, Victoria
- Died: 14 October 1969 (aged 80); Fitzroy, Victoria
- Original team: Beverley
- Height: 177 cm (5 ft 10 in)
- Weight: 71 kg (157 lb)

Playing career^{1}
Years	Club	Games (Goals)
1911	Melbourne	1 (0)
- ^{1} Playing statistics correct to the end of 1911.

William McKeone (18 February 1889 – 14 October 1969) was an Australian rules footballer who played with Melbourne in the Victorian Football League (VFL).
