= Reg Gregson =

Australian rules footballer

Personal information
- Full name: Reginald George Joseph Gregson
- Born: 13 February 1891; Seymour, Victoria
- Died: 17 January 1938 (aged 46); Melbourne, Victoria
- Original team: Dandenong
- Height: 184 cm (6 ft 0 in)
- Weight: 83 kg (183 lb)

Playing career^{1}
Years	Club	Games (Goals)
1911	St Kilda	3 (2)
- ^{1} Playing statistics correct to the end of 1911.

Reginald George Joseph Gregson (13 February 1891 – 17 January 1938) was an Australian rules footballer who played with St Kilda in the Victorian Football League (VFL).
