= Jack Geggie =

Australian rules footballer and coach

Personal information
- Full name: John Geggie
- Born: 29 October 1881; Richmond, Victoria
- Died: 20 January 1973 (aged 91); Glen Iris, Victoria
- Original team: North Melbourne (VFA)
- Height: 179 cm (5 ft 10 in)
- Weight: 81 kg (179 lb)
- Position: Defender

Playing career^{1}
Years	Club	Games (Goals)
1902–04	Essendon	43 (11)
1911	Melbourne	1 (0)
Total		44 (11)
- ^{1} Playing statistics correct to the end of 1911.

Jack Geggie (29 October 1881 – 20 January 1973) was an Australian rules footballer who played for Essendon and Melbourne in the Victorian Football League (VFL).

Although he started his career at Victorian Football Association (VFA) club North Melbourne as a forward and follower, Geggie was used as a defender during his time with Essendon. He appeared as a full-back in the 1902 VFL Grand Final, when Essendon was comprehensively defeated by Collingwood. The following two seasons, he represented the league at interstate football.

Geggie returned to the VFA in 1906, as captain-coach of Richmond. He only remained in that role a year and later, after a stint at Melbourne, captain-coached Oakleigh.
