= Harry Matheson =

Australian rules footballer

Personal information
- Full name: William Henry Matheson
- Born: 12 June 1891; Nagambie, Victoria
- Died: 4 November 1956 (aged 65); Kew, Victoria
- Original team: Clifton Juniors
- Height: 173 cm (5 ft 8 in)
- Weight: 72.5 kg (160 lb)

Playing career^{1}
Years	Club	Games (Goals)
1909–1910	St Kilda	7 (4)
1911–1912	Carlton	7 (3)
1914	Collingwood	9 (8)
Total		23 (15)
- ^{1} Playing statistics correct to the end of 1914.

William Henry Matheson (12 June 1891 – 4 November 1956) was an Australian rules footballer who played with St Kilda, Carlton and Collingwood in the Victorian Football League (VFL).
