= Les Rowe =

Australian rules footballer

Personal information
- Full name: William Leslie Rowe
- Born: 29 October 1890; Carlton North, Victoria
- Died: 8 March 1965 (aged 74); Mount Martha, Victoria
- Original team: Carlton District
- Height: 168 cm (5 ft 6 in)
- Weight: 73 kg (161 lb)

Playing career^{1}
Years	Club	Games (Goals)
1911	Carlton	2 (0)
- ^{1} Playing statistics correct to the end of 1911.

William Leslie Rowe (29 October 1890 – 8 March 1965) was an Australian rules footballer who played with Carlton in the Victorian Football League (VFL).
