= Leslie Marks =

Australian rules footballer

Personal information
- Full name: Leslie Richard Marks
- Born: 14 December 1892
- Died: 27 August 1919 (aged 26)
- Original team: Melbourne Grammar

Playing career^{1}
Years	Club	Games (Goals)
1914	University	14 (13)
- ^{1} Playing statistics correct to the end of 1914.

Leslie Richard Marks (14 December 1892 – 27 August 1919) was an Australian rules footballer who played with University in the Victorian Football League.

He served twice during World War I, firstly with the 6th Field Ambulance unit, before returning to Australia in 1916. He then re-enlisted with the 8th Field Artillery Brigade unit in November 1917. He died soon after returning to Australia in 1919 when he was a passenger in a car that crashed in Bendigo, killing Marks and two other passengers.

== Sources ==
- Holmesby, Russell & Main, Jim (2007). The Encyclopedia of AFL Footballers. 7th ed. Melbourne: Bas Publishing.
