= Bill Hickey (footballer, born 1880) =

Australian rules footballer

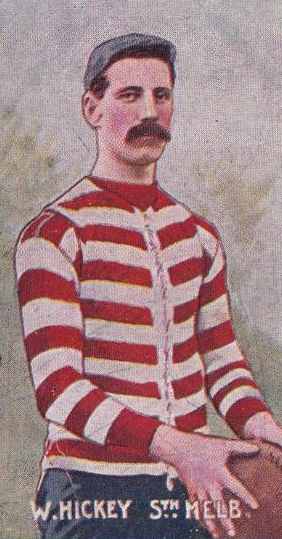
- Cigarette card of Hickey in 1906

Personal information
- Full name: William Thomas Hickey
- Born: 20 February 1880; Allans Flat, Victoria
- Died: 15 March 1969 (aged 89); Wangaratta
- Original team: Wangaratta
- Position: Defence

Playing career^{1}
Years	Club	Games (Goals)
1902–05	South Melbourne	45 (1)
1907	Carlton	1 (0)
Total		46 (1)
- ^{1} Playing statistics correct to the end of 1907.

William Thomas Hickey (20 February 1880 – 15 March 1969) was an Australian rules footballer who played in defence with South Melbourne and Carlton in the Victorian Football League (VFL).
