= Arch Robinson =

Australian rules footballer

Personal information
- Full name: Archibald Robinson
- Born: 9 July 1890; Mitta Mitta, Victoria
- Original team: North Melbourne Juniors

Playing career^{1}
Years	Club	Games (Goals)
1911	Richmond	1 (0)
1912	Melbourne City (VFA)	8 (0)
1913	Port Melbourne (VFA)	1 (0)
1914	Hawthorn (VFA)	1 (0)
1914	Northcote (VFA)	1 (0)
Total		12 (0)
- ^{1} Playing statistics correct to the end of 1911.

Archibald Robinson (born 9 July 1890) was an Australian rules footballer who played for the Richmond Football Club in the Victorian Football League (VFL) and Hawthorn, Melbourne City, Northcote and Port Melbourne in the Victorian Football Association (VFA).

== Family ==
The son of William George Robinson (1840-1894), and Elizabeth Ann Robinson (1854-1913), née Lowns, Archibald Robinson was born at Mitta Mitta, Victoria on 9 July 1890.

He married Edith Robinson Whitehead (1889-1966), later Mrs. John Francis Muir, on 11 January 1913; their only child was stillborn on 22 August 1913. They were divorced in 1921.

== Football ==
=== Melbourne City (VFA) ===
In 1912 he was cleared from Richmond to the Melbourne City Football Club in the VFA.

== Military service ==
He enlisted in the First AIF on 17 August 1914, served overseas with the 7th Battalion, was in the first landings at Gallipoli on 25 April 1915, and was transferred to the Australian Army Provost Corps in 1916.

He was wounded twice in action, and returned to Australia on 20 October 1918.
