= Alexander Dick (cricketer) =

Australian cricketer

Personal information
- Full name: Alexander Williamson Dick
- Born: 30 November 1922; Boulder, Western Australia
- Died: 31 January 2018 (aged 95)
- Batting: Right-handed
- Bowling: Right-arm fast-medium
- Role: Batsman
- Relatives: Ian Dick (brother); Billy Dick (uncle)

Domestic team information
- Years: Team
- 1949: Western Australia

Career statistics
Competition	First-class
Matches	1
Runs scored	8
Batting average	4.00
100s/50s	0/0
Top score	8
Balls bowled	32
Wickets	0
Bowling average	–
5 wickets in innings	–
10 wickets in match	–
Best bowling	–
Catches/stumpings	0/–
- Source: ESPNCricinfo, 16 July 2011

Alexander Williamson Dick (30 November 1922 – 31 January 2018) was an Australian cricketer who played one first-class match for Western Australia in 1949. He played his only match against Victoria, scoring a duck batting at number eight in the first innings and eight runs batting at number nine in the second innings. He took 0/11 off of four overs in Victoria's first innings bowling right-arm fast-medium. Born in Boulder, he was the brother of Ian Dick, who captained Australia in the field hockey tournament at the 1956 Summer Olympics in Melbourne, and the nephew of Australian rules footballer Billy Dick, who captained Carlton to the 1914 VFL premiership.
