= Herbert Cock (Australian footballer) =

Australian rules footballer

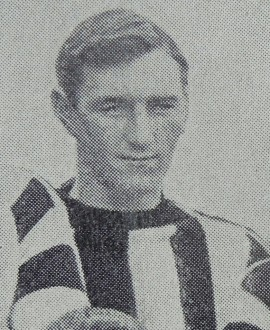
- Cock in 1909

Personal information
- Full name: Herbert Horace Sydney Cock
- Born: 14 March 1888; Clifton Hill, Victoria
- Died: 16 July 1968 (aged 80); Box Hill, Victoria
- Original team: Clifton Hill
- Height: 171 cm (5 ft 7 in)

Playing career^{1}
Years	Club	Games (Goals)
1909	Collingwood	2 (1)
1911	Carlton	3 (0)
Total		5 (1)
- ^{1} Playing statistics correct to the end of 1911.

Herbert Horace Sydney Cock (14 March 1888 – 16 July 1968) was an Australian rules footballer who played with Collingwood and Carlton in the Victorian Football League (VFL).
