= Tom Handley (Australian footballer) =

Australian rules footballer

Personal information
- Full name: Thomas Albert Handley
- Born: 24 December 1885; Melbourne, Victoria
- Died: 15 January 1948 (aged 62); Northcote, Victoria

Playing career^{1}
Years	Club	Games (Goals)
1911	St Kilda	1 (0)
- ^{1} Playing statistics correct to the end of 1911.

Thomas Albert Handley (24 December 1885 – 15 January 1948) was an Australian rules footballer who played with St Kilda in the Victorian Football League (VFL).
