= Rupe Matthews =

Australian rules footballer

Personal information
- Full name: Rupert Mackay Tyson Matthews
- Born: 19 July 1888; Bourke, New South Wales
- Died: 21 February 1966 (aged 77); South Yarra, Victoria
- Height: 185 cm (6 ft 1 in)

Playing career^{1}
Years	Club	Games (Goals)
1909–11	University	20 (20)
- ^{1} Playing statistics correct to the end of 1911.

Rupert Mackay Tyson Matthews (19 July 1888 – 21 February 1966) was an Australian rules footballer who played with University in the Victorian Football League (VFL) between 1909 and 1911.

He later served in World War I.
