= Paul White (Australian footballer) =

Australian rules footballer

Personal information
- Full name: Paul John White
- Born: 4 July 1893; Westbury, Tasmania
- Died: 25 October 1973 (aged 80); Camberwell, Victoria
- Original team: St Ignatius

Playing career^{1}
| Years | Club | Games (Goals) |
| 1911–14, 1918–19 | St Kilda | 20 (5) |
- ^{1} Playing statistics correct to the end of 1919.

Paul John White (4 July 1893 – 25 October 1973) was an Australian rules footballer who played with St Kilda in the Victorian Football League (VFL).

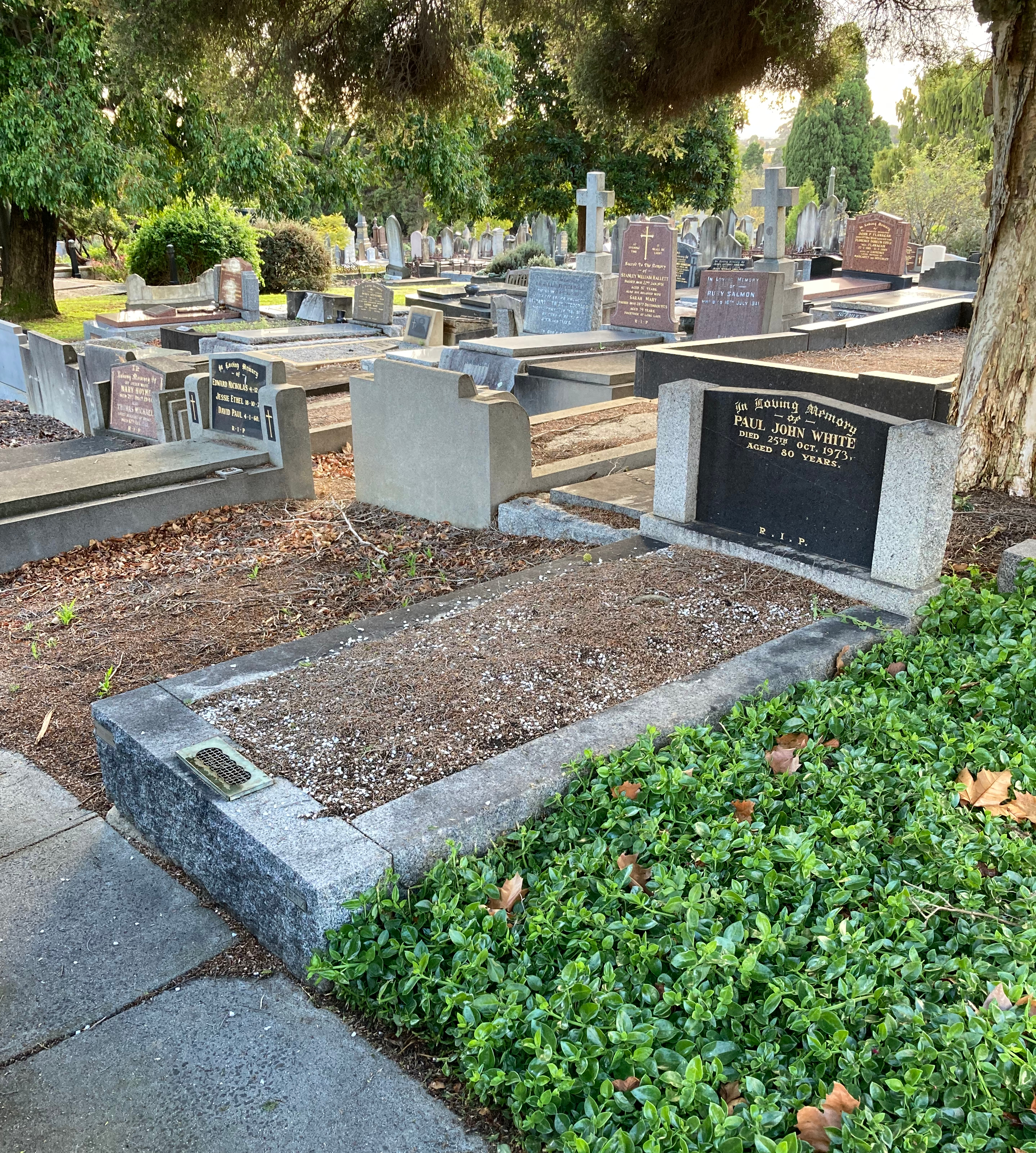
White's grave at Boroondara General Cemetery
