= Billy Irwin (Australian rules footballer) =

Australian rules footballer

Personal information
- Full name: William Henry Irwin
- Born: 14 October 1884; Footscray, Victoria
- Died: 17 October 1946 (aged 62); North Adelaide

Playing career^{1}
Years	Club	Games (Goals)
1911	Melbourne	2 (1)
- ^{1} Playing statistics correct to the end of 1911.

William Henry Irwin (14 October 1884 – 17 October 1946) was an Australian rules footballer who played with Melbourne in the Victorian Football League (VFL).

Irwin played two games of football for Melbourne in 1911 and was also a keen cricketer. He enlisted in the artillery in World War I, subsequently becoming a chaplain. He later was a teacher at Trinity Grammar School, Victoria and St Peter's College, Adelaide.
