= Ashley Vines =

Australian rules footballer

Personal information
- Full name: Robert Ashley Vines
- Born: 16 January 1891; Kew, Victoria
- Died: 10 August 1977 (aged 86); Canterbury, Victoria
- Original team: University Metro / Scotch College

Playing career^{1}
Years	Club	Games (Goals)
1913–1914	University	17 (0)
- ^{1} Playing statistics correct to the end of 1914.

Robert Ashley Vines (16 January 1891 – 10 August 1977) was an Australian rules footballer who played for the University Football Club in the Victorian Football League (VFL).

== Sources ==
- Holmesby, Russell & Main, Jim (2007). The Encyclopedia of AFL Footballers. 7th ed. Melbourne: Bas Publishing.
- Ashley Vines's playing statistics from AFL Tables
