= Norm Ingham =

Australian rules footballer

Personal information
- Full name: Norman Gordon Ingham
- Born: 25 May 1890; Clifton Hill, Victoria
- Died: 19 May 1959 (aged 68); Mooroopna, Victoria

Playing career^{1}
Years	Club	Games (Goals)
1911	St Kilda	2 (0)
- ^{1} Playing statistics correct to the end of 1911.

Norman Gordon Ingham (25 May 1890 – 19 May 1959) was an Australian rules footballer who played with St Kilda in the Victorian Football League (VFL).
