= Roy Johnson (footballer) =

Australian rules footballer (1891–1962)

Personal information
- Full name: Roy Clifford Johnson
- Born: 18 July 1891; Footscray, Victoria
- Died: 8 May 1962 (aged 70); Croydon, Victoria
- Original team: Carlton District

Playing career^{1}
Years	Club	Games (Goals)
1911–12	Carlton	15 (21)
1912	Footscray (VFA)	6 (9)
- ^{1} Playing statistics correct to the end of 1912.

Roy Clifford Johnson (18 July 1891 – 8 May 1962) was an Australian rules footballer who played with Carlton in the Victorian Football League (VFL).

He kicked a career high six goals in a win over Richmond at Princes Park in round five, 1911 but by the middle of the next season Johnson had transferred to Footscray in the Victorian Football Association (VFA), performing well in a side that finished top of the ladder but missed out on playing in the finals due to illness.
