= Artie Freeman =

Australian rules footballer

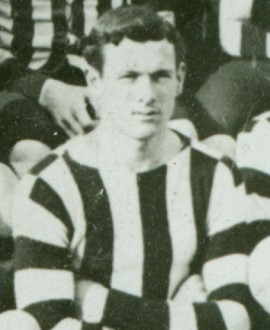
- Freeman in 1908

Personal information
- Full name: Arthur Freeman
- Born: 17 September 1887; Bairnsdale, Victoria
- Died: 15 September 1973 (aged 85); Carlton North, Victoria
- Original team: Preston District
- Height: 173 cm (5 ft 8 in)
- Weight: 70 kg (154 lb)

Playing career^{1}
Years	Club	Games (Goals)
1908–1910	Collingwood	27 (17)
1911	Fitzroy	1 (0)
1911	Essendon	1 (0)
Total		29 (17)
- ^{1} Playing statistics correct to the end of 1911.

Arthur Freeman (17 September 1887 – 15 September 1973) was an Australian rules footballer who played for the Collingwood Football Club, Fitzroy Football Club and Essendon Football Club in the Victorian Football League (VFL).
