= Ian Dick (Australian sportsman) =

Australian cricketer and field hockey player

Personal information
- Full name: Ian Robinson Dick
- Born: 30 August 1926; Boulder, Western Australia
- Died: 5 September 2012 (aged 86); Perth, Western Australia
- Batting: Right-handed
- Role: Batsman
- Relatives: Alexander Dick (brother); Billy Dick (uncle)

Domestic team information
- Years: Team
- 1950: Western Australia

Career statistics
Competition	First-class
Matches	1
Runs scored	27
Batting average	13.50
100s/50s	0/0
Top score	27
Catches/stumpings	0/–
- Source: CricketArchive, 16 July 2011

Ian Robinson Dick (30 August 1926 – 5 September 2012) was an Australian cricketer and field hockey player who played one first-class cricket match for Western Australia in 1950 and also captained Australia in the field hockey tournament at the 1956 Summer Olympics in Melbourne. Born in Boulder, Western Australia, Dick was the brother of Alexander Dick (who also played cricket for Western Australia) and David Dick (who was the school captain of Wesley College in 1936 and also played hockey for Western Australia). The brothers' uncle, Billy Dick, captained Carlton to the 1914 VFL premiership. Having worked as a pharmacist outside of sport, Dick died in September 2012.

== Cricket career ==
Dick began playing in the WACA District Cricket competition at an early age, and had played C-grade matches for the South Perth Cricket Club at the age of 12, as well as representing his school, Wesley College. He made his A-grade debut for West Perth during the 1944–45 season at the age of 18, but transferred back to South Perth the following season when the club was admitted to the first-grade competition. Dick later vice-captained South Perth, and holds the club record for the highest first-grade career runs total. Dick played one match for Western Australia in 1950 against Queensland, scoring a duck in the first innings and 27 runs in the second innings. He also captained Western Australia Colts in one match against the MCC in 1950.

== Hockey career ==
Dick made his debut for Western Australia in 1946, and his debut for Australia in 1948. He represented Australia in every match from 1948 to 1958, and captained the team at the 1956 Summer Olympics in Melbourne, scoring Australia's first goal in Olympic competition. He also captained Western Australia. Dick was inducted in the Western Australian Hockey Hall of Champions in 1991, and was inducted into the Hockey Australia Hall of Fame in 2008.
