= Will Houghton =

Australian rules footballer

Personal information
- Full name: William Sherwood Houghton
- Born: 5 January 1890; Stirling, Victoria
- Died: 26 March 1952 (aged 62); Parkville, Victoria

Playing career^{1}
Years	Club	Games (Goals)
1914	University	2 (0)
- ^{1} Playing statistics correct to the end of 1914.

William Sherwood Houghton (5 January 1890 – 26 March 1952) was an Australian rules footballer who played with University during the 1914 VFL season. Houghton enlisted to serve in World War I in mid 1915 and served until the end of the war.
