= Bill Lyon =

Australian rules footballer

Personal information
- Full name: Alexander Victor Lyon
- Born: 19 January 1886; Apsley, Victoria
- Died: 13 January 1962 (aged 75); Mildura

Playing career^{1}
Years	Club	Games (Goals)
1910–11	University	7 (1)
- ^{1} Playing statistics correct to the end of 1911.

Alexander Victor "Bill" Lyon (19 January 1886 – 13 January 1962) was an Australian rules footballer who played with University in the Victorian Football League in 1910 and 1911. He played for Footscray in the Victorian Football Association prior to joining University.
