= George Deas (footballer) =

Australian rules footballer

Personal information
- Full name: George Deas
- Born: 28 September 1888; Port Melbourne, Victoria
- Died: 27 July 1958 (aged 69); Eildon, Victoria
- Original team: Port Melbourne (VFA)
- Height: 178 cm (5 ft 10 in)
- Weight: 75 kg (165 lb)

Playing career^{1}
Years	Club	Games (Goals)
1911–12	South Melbourne	4 (3)
- ^{1} Playing statistics correct to the end of 1912.

George Deas (28 September 1888 – 27 July 1958) was an Australian rules footballer who played with South Melbourne in the Victorian Football League (VFL).
