= Harold Curran =

Australian rules footballer (1888–1971)

Personal information
- Full name: Harold Maurice Curran
- Born: 10 June 1888; Stratford, Victoria
- Died: 26 June 1971 (aged 83); Dandenong, Victoria
- Original team: Stratford

Playing career^{1}
Years	Club	Games (Goals)
1911	Melbourne	2 (0)
- ^{1} Playing statistics correct to the end of 1911.

Harold Maurice Curran (10 June 1888 – 26 June 1971) was an Australian rules footballer who played with Melbourne in the Victorian Football League (VFL).
