= Ken Edgar =

Australian rules footballer

Personal information
- Full name: Kenneth Ewart Edgar
- Born: 24 June 1890; Flemington, Victoria
- Died: 20 May 1961 (aged 70); Sunbury, Victoria
- Original team: Caulfield

Playing career^{1}
Years	Club	Games (Goals)
1909–10	St Kilda	9 (0)
1911	Melbourne	2 (0)
Total		11 (0)
- ^{1} Playing statistics correct to the end of 1911.

Kenneth Ewart Edgar (24 June 1890 – 20 May 1961) was an Australian rules footballer who played with St Kilda and Melbourne in the Victorian Football League (VFL).
