= Charlie Taylor (footballer, born 1878) =

Australian rules footballer

Personal information
- Full name: Charles Joseph Amphlett Taylor
- Born: 8 December 1878; Collingwood, Victoria
- Died: 25 August 1960 (aged 81); Mont Albert, Victoria
- Original team: Caulfield / Hawthorn (VJFL)
- Height: 182 cm (6 ft 0 in)
- Weight: 89 kg (196 lb)

Playing career^{1}
Years	Club	Games (Goals)
1906	Melbourne	3 (1)
1911	Carlton	3 (0)
1911–12	St Kilda	7 (1)
Total		13 (2)
- ^{1} Playing statistics correct to the end of 1912.

Charles Joseph Amphlett Taylor (8 December 1878 – 25 August 1960) was an Australian rules footballer who played with Melbourne, Carlton and St Kilda in the Victorian Football League (VFL).
