= Bruce Campbell (Australian footballer) =

Australian rules footballer

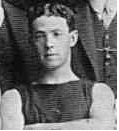
- Campbell in 1911

Personal information
- Full name: Robert Wallace Bruce Campbell
- Born: 2 May 1890; Richmond, Victoria
- Died: 16 October 1964 (aged 74); Preston, Victoria
- Original team: Subiaco (WAFL)

Playing career^{1}
| Years | Club | Games (Goals) |
| 1911 | Carlton | 3 (0) |
| 1911–1912 | Fitzroy | 15 (27) |
| 1920 | Melbourne | 5 (4) |
| Total | | 23 (31) |
- ^{1} Playing statistics correct to the end of 1920.

Robert Wallace Bruce Campbell (2 May 1890 – 16 October 1964) was an Australian rules footballer who played with Carlton, Fitzroy and Melbourne in the Victorian Football League (VFL).

Campbell, a Victorian by birth, was brought up in Western Australia and debuted for Subiaco in 1908.

He started his VFL career at Carlton, appearing in the opening three rounds of the 1911 season. His first two league game ended in draws and the third was decided by a margin of just two points. They would be the only games he played for Carlton and he finished the season at Fitzroy.

Used as a forward, Campbell made an immediate impression at his new club and despite only playing the second half of the season was their leading goal-kicker with 25 goals. He would only make six appearances in 1912 and decided to return to Subiaco.

Campbell continued playing for Subiaco until 1919, although he missed three seasons during the war. He was a member of Subiaco's 1913 and 1915 premiership winning teams.

In 1920 he once again returned to Victoria and despite being 30 years of age was signed by Melbourne. He however played only five senior games.

He would go on to become a lieutenant in the Australian Army, having volunteered to serve in World War II.
