= Tommy Graham (Australian rules footballer) =

Australian rules footballer

Personal information
- Full name: Thomas Oswald Graham
- Born: 12 May 1886; Narracan
- Died: 29 April 1933 (aged 46); Melbourne
- Original teams: University and Metropolitan Club

Playing career^{1}
Years	Club	Games (Goals)
1909–12	University	9 (1)
- ^{1} Playing statistics correct to the end of 1912.

Thomas Oswald Graham (12 May 1886 – 29 April 1933) was an Australian rules footballer who played with University in the Victorian Football League (VFL).

== Sources ==
- Holmesby, Russell & Main, Jim (2007). The Encyclopedia of AFL Footballers. 7th ed. Melbourne: Bas Publishing.
