= Wally Naismith =

Australian rules footballer

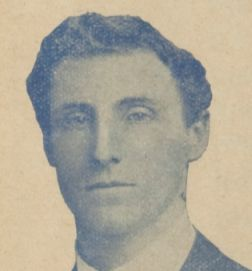

Personal information
- Full name: Walter Henry Naismith
- Born: 31 May 1881; Prahran, Victoria
- Died: 9 January 1954 (aged 72); Alphington, Victoria
- Original team: Clifton Hill
- Position: Defender

Playing career^{1}
Years	Club	Games (Goals)	
1902–1910	Fitzroy	143 (20)	
1911–1912	Melbourne	36 (0)	
Total		179 (20)	

Umpiring career
Years	League	Role	Games
1915–1919	VFL	Field umpire	11
1913–1927	VFL	Boundary umpire	207
- ^{1} Playing statistics correct to the end of 1912.

Career highlights
- 2× VFL premiership player: 1904, 1905

Walter Henry "Wally" Naismith (31 May 1881 – 9 January 1954) was an Australian rules footballer who played for the Fitzroy Football Club and Melbourne Football Club in the Victorian Football League (VFL). He was the twin brother of Fitzroy player Charlie Naismith.

Playing mostly as a defender, Naismith was part of the strong Fitzroy side that won back to back premierships in 1904 and 1905. He left Fitzroy after the 1910 season and joined Melbourne, appearing 36 times for his new club over two seasons to bring his final VFL tally to 179 games. After retiring, Naismith was the field umpire for 11 VFL matches, from 1915 to 1919, but had more success as a boundary umpire, umpiring 207 matches from the boundary, from 1913 to 1927, including the 1919, 1920, 1922, 1925, 1926 and 1927 Grand Finals.

In 1910, Naismith married Eva Emmeline Dummett (sister of Collingwood player Alf Dummett). Two of their sons, Herb Naismith and Alby Naismith, also played VFL football.
