= Billy Newing =

Australian rules footballer (1892–1970)

Personal information
- Full name: William Joseph Newing
- Born: 1 August 1892; Moonee Ponds, Victoria
- Died: 7 March 1970 (aged 77); Kew, Victoria
- Height: 185 cm (6 ft 1 in)
- Weight: 79 kg (174 lb)

Playing career^{1}
Years	Club	Games (Goals)
1913	University	5 (5)
- ^{1} Playing statistics correct to the end of 1913.

William Joseph Newing (1 August 1892 – 7 March 1970) was an Australian rules footballer who played with University in the Victorian Football League (VFL) in 1913.

== Family ==
The son of John Newing, and Mary Jane Newing (1859-1926), née Kernan, William Joseph Newing was born at Moonee Ponds, Victoria on 1 August 1892.

He married Olivia Marguerite Byrne on 20 November 1922.

== Education ==
Educated at the Christian Brothers College, in East St Kilda, he began his medical studies at the University of Melbourne in 1912, graduating Bachelor of Medicine and Bachelor of Surgery (MB BS), in absentia, on 20 December 1916.

== Football ==
He played five games for the First XVIII of the Melbourne University Football Club in the VFL competition in 1913. His first match was against Fitzroy on 26 April 1913. and the last, against St Kilda on 5 July 1913. He was awarded a "half blue" for football.

== Cricket ==
He played district cricket with Essendon Cricket Club (four matches, 1912–13 season) and with the Melbourne University Cricket Club (six matches, 1914–15 to 1916–17 seasons).

== Military service ==
He enlisted in the First AIF on 26 November 1917, and served overseas (in France) as a Medical Officer in the Australian Army Medical Corps. He left Australia aboard HMAT Themistocles (A32) on 28 January 1918, and returned to Australia aboard HMAT Anchises (A68), arriving in Melbourne on 22 September 1919.

== Medicine ==
Upon graduation, he began his career as a Resident Medical Officer at the Melbourne Hospital; and, following his military service, he worked at St Vincent's Hospital, Melbourne:

Newing was educated at the Christian Brothers College, East St Kilda. In 1918, he enlisted in the Australian Army Medical Corps and served as a captain in France. At St Vincent’s Hospital in Melbourne, where he worked for over forty years, he was remembered as a tall, military-looking and distinguished figure. Being some seven or eight years older than his contemporaries—due to his career being interrupted by war service—his demonstrations of clinical findings made a strong impression on his students. His specialty was chest diseases, particularly pulmonary tuberculosis, from which he himself suffered as a consequence of his wartime experiences (Carolan, 2015, pp. 131–132).

=== University Council ===
For a number of years he was a member of the University Council of the University of Melbourne, representing "Medicine and Surgery".

=== Victorian Tuberculosis Association ===
He served as the President of the Victorian Division of the Australian Tuberculosis Association.

== Death ==
He died at his home in Kew, Victoria on 7 March 1970.
