= Bill Hickey (bobsleigh) =

American bobsledder (1936–2025)

Personal information
- Full name: William David Hickey
- Born: June 16, 1936 Keene Valley, New York, U.S.
- Died: October 29, 2025 (aged 89)

Sport
- Sport: Bobsleigh

William David Hickey (June 16, 1936 – October 29, 2025) was an American bobsledder. He competed at the 1964 Winter Olympics and the 1968 Winter Olympics.

Hickey died on October 29, 2025, at the age of 89.
