= Norm Grigg =

Australian rules footballer

Personal information
- Full name: Norman Cecil Grigg
- Born: 22 June 1893; Drysdale, Victoria
- Died: 1 July 1945 (aged 52); Melbourne, Victoria
- Original team: Portarlington

Playing career^{1}
Years	Club	Games (Goals)
1911	Geelong	4 (1)
- ^{1} Playing statistics correct to the end of 1911.

Norman Cecil Grigg (22 June 1893 – 1 July 1945) was an Australian rules footballer who played with Geelong in the Victorian Football League (VFL).

== Family ==
The son of Thomas Tobias Grigg (1851–1930), and Katherine Douglas Grigg (1854–1946), née Williamson, Norman Cecil Grigg was born at Drysdale, Victoria on 22 June 1893.

One of his brothers, Richard Randolph "Dick" Grigg (1885–1972) also played VFL football with Geelong.

== Football ==
=== Geelong (VFL) ===
In 1911 he played in four games for Geelong in the VFL. Not only did he play the four games alongside his brother, Dick, but also alongside the Eason brothers, Bill and Alec.

== Military service ==
Employed as the manager of the Portarlington flax mill, he enlisted in the First AIF in August 1915, and served overseas in France, where he was wounded in action (he was "gassed") in August 1918. He was invalided to England, and returned to his unit in November 1918. He returned to Australia on the HMAT Orontes in June 1919.

== Death ==
He died on 1 July 1945.
