= Howard Stafford =

Australian rules footballer

Personal information
- Full name: Howard Raymond Stafford
- Born: 24 March 1893; Wedderburn, Victoria
- Died: 23 May 1942 (aged 49); Myanmar
- Original team: Wesley College

Playing career^{1}
Years	Club	Games (Goals)
1914	University	5 (2)
- ^{1} Playing statistics correct to the end of 1914.

Howard Raymond Stafford MM (24 March 1893 – 23 May 1942) was an Australian rules footballer who played with University in the Victorian Football League (VFL).

He later served in World War I, being awarded a Military Medal in 1917.
