= Reuben Patton =

Australian rules footballer

Personal information
- Full name: Reuben Tom Patton
- Born: 15 August 1883; Bundalong, Victoria
- Died: 24 June 1962 (aged 78); Melbourne, Victoria
- Height: 191 cm (6 ft 3 in)

Playing career^{1}
Years	Club	Games (Goals)
1914	University	6 (0)
- ^{1} Playing statistics correct to the end of 1914.

Reuben Tom Patton (15 August 1883 – 24 June 1962) was an Australian rules footballer who played with University in the Victorian Football League.

He later served in World War I before embarking on a successful career as an academic in the fields of forestry and botany. He died in 1962.
