= Ted Politz =

Australian rules footballer

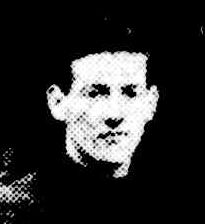

Personal information
- Full name: Edward Matthew Politz
- Born: 28 July 1889; Richmond, Victoria
- Died: 14 February 1967 (aged 77); St Kilda, Victoria
- Original team: Yarraville

Playing career^{1}
Years	Club	Games (Goals)
1911–13	Melbourne	26 (19)
- ^{1} Playing statistics correct to the end of 1913.

Edward Matthew Politz (28 July 1889 – 14 February 1967) was an Australian rules footballer who played with Melbourne in the Victorian Football League (VFL).

== Family ==
The son of Charles Zapp Politz (1854-1916), and Jane Politz (1856-1914), née Stewart, Edward Matthew Politz was born on 28 July 1889.

He Married Elizabeth Agnes Stanley (1894-1983) in 1914.

== Football ==
Recruited from Yarraville Football Club in the Victorian Junior Football Association, he played his first senior match for Melbourne, against Geelong, on 1 July 1911.

His twenty-sixth (and last) senior game for Melbourne was against Essendon, in the last round of the 1913 season, on 30 August 1913.
