= Arthur Newbound =

Australian rules footballer (1886–1957)

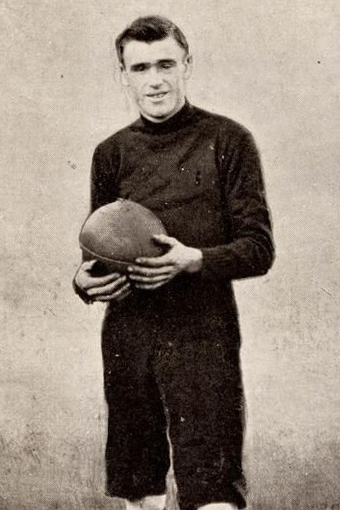
- Newbound in 1910

Personal information
- Full name: Arthur Richey Newbound
- Born: 4 March 1886; Collingwood, Victoria
- Died: 31 August 1957 (aged 71); Prahran, Victoria

Playing career^{1}
Years	Club	Games (Goals)
1909–1910	Fitzroy	24 (13)
1911	St Kilda	1 (1)
Total		25 (14)
- ^{1} Playing statistics correct to the end of 1911.

Arthur Richey Newbound (4 March 1886 – 31 August 1957) was an Australian rules footballer who played for the Fitzroy Football Club and St Kilda Football Club in the Victorian Football League (VFL).

== Football ==
=== Bribery scandal ===
While playing with Fitzroy, Newbound was one of the five Fitzroy players that gave evidence to a special VFL inquiry into the allegations, revealed in the press a week earlier, that they had been offered cash inducements, by an (otherwise unknown) individual, to play "dead" in the 3 September 1910 match against South Melbourne, the result of which was vital for South Melbourne's final chances.

As a result of the comprehensive VFL inquiry, wherein the South Melbourne delegate advised the Inquiry that the football club had no connection with the offer, and that extensive enquiries had failed to reveal the identity of those making (and those behind the making of) the offer, and in which the Fitzroy footballers George Holden, "Boxer" Milne, Jack Cooper, and Newbound all gave "privileged" evidence (in that they "need[ed] not fear [the] consequences" of doing so). (Bill Walker, whose evidence matched that of Holden's, was not required to attend in person.)

The Inquiry exonerated all five Fitzroy players, and released the following press statement on 28 September:

""That after hearing the evidence of the Fitzroy players, the league find that they were approached with the offer of trivial sums of money by certain men unknown to them, and whose identity the league have no means of ascertaining. The league consider the players are to be commended for their action in the matter."

=== St Kilda (VFL) ===
He played one First XVIII match for St Kilda, on 27 May 1911, against Melbourne, before being cleared to Fitzroy Juniors in July 1911.

=== Essendon A (VFA) ===
Cleared from St Kilda to Essendon A in the VFA in May 1912.

=== Northcote (VFA) ===
He was cleared from Essendon A to Northcote in May 1913.

== Death ==
He died at the Alfred Hospital in Prahran, Victoria on 31 August 1957.
