= Henry Jane =

Australian rules footballer

Harry Jane

Personal information
- Full name: Henry Edward Jane
- Born: 8 August 1890; Dunolly, Victoria
- Died: 23 March 1933 (aged 42); Leongatha, Victoria
- Original team: Kalgoorlie City

Playing career^{1}
Years	Club	Games (Goals)
1911	Carlton	3 (1)
1914	St Kilda	10 (0)
Total		13 (1)
- ^{1} Playing statistics correct to the end of 1914.

Henry Edward Jane (8 August 1890 – 23 March 1933) was an Australian rules footballer who played with Carlton and St Kilda in the Victorian Football League (VFL).

== Death ==
He died on 23 March 1933.
