= Jack Hammond (footballer) =

Australian rules footballer

Personal information
- Full name: John Hammond
- Born: 30 September 1884; South Melbourne, Victoria
- Died: 5 June 1971 (aged 86); East Melbourne, Victoria
- Original team: Northcote (MJFA).

Playing career^{1}
Years	Club	Games (Goals)
1906	Carlton	2 (1)
1907	Melbourne	2 (2)
Total		4 (3)
- ^{1} Playing statistics correct to the end of 1907.

John "Jack" Hammond (30 September 1884 – 5 June 1971) was an Australian rules footballer who played with Carlton and Melbourne in the Victorian Football League (VFL).

== Family ==
The son of Thomas Hammond, and Ann Hammond, née Williams, John Hammond was born on 30 September 1884. Two of his brothers, Charlie Hammond (1886-1936), and Billy Hammond (1887-1919) also played VFL football.

He married Millicent Evelyn Iverson (1897-1960) in 1921.

== Football ==
During a Melbourne practice match against VFA club Hawthorn, on 13 April 1908 at the MCG, Hammond slipped and fell heavily to the ground, fracturing his right leg below the knee. He never played again.
