= Charlie Hay =

Australian rules footballer

Personal information
- Full name: Charles Burt Hay
- Born: 4 November 1881; Prospect Farm, Seaford Meadows, South Australia
- Died: 21 August 1945 (aged 63); Broadmeadows, Victoria
- Original team: Mount Gambier
- Height: 183 cm (6 ft 0 in)
- Weight: 89 kg (196 lb)

Playing career^{1}
Years	Club	Games (Goals)
1910	Carlton	1 (0)
1911	Essendon	2 (0)
Total		3 (0)
- ^{1} Playing statistics correct to the end of 1911.

Charles Burt Hay (4 November 1881 – 21 August 1945) was an Australian rules footballer who played with Carlton and Essendon in the Victorian Football League (VFL).
