= Arthur Gall =

Australian rules footballer

Personal information
- Full name: Arthur John Gall
- Born: 29 September 1885; Bendigo
- Died: 19 September 1953 (aged 67); Kew, Victoria
- Original team: Bendigo Grammar

Playing career^{1}
Years	Club	Games (Goals)
1908	University	2 (0)
- ^{1} Playing statistics correct to the end of 1908.

Arthur John "Artie" Gall (29 September 1885 – 19 September 1953) was an Australian rules footballer who played for the University Football Club in the Victorian Football League (VFL).

== Sources ==
- Holmesby, Russell & Main, Jim (2007). The Encyclopedia of AFL Footballers. 7th ed. Melbourne: Bas Publishing.
