= Gordon Morrissey =

Australian rules footballer (1894 – 1970)

Personal information
- Full name: Gordon Carey Morrissey
- Born: 8 July 1894; Alphington, Victoria
- Died: 8 March 1970 (aged 75); Ingham, Queensland
- Original team: University Metropolitan

Playing career^{1}
Years	Club	Games (Goals)
1914	University	2 (0)
- ^{1} Playing statistics correct to the end of 1914.

Gordon Carey Morrissey OBE (8 July 1894 – 8 March 1970) was an Australian rules footballer who played for the University Football Club in the Victorian Football League (VFL) while a medical student at Melbourne University. After University left the VFL at the end of the 1914 season, he remained with the club when it resumed in the Metropolitan Amateur Football Association (MAFA) in 1915.

Morrissey served in World War I before embarking on a medical career in Ingham, Queensland. He was appointed an Officer of the Order of the British Empire for his work in addressing an outbreak of Leptospirosis in the Ingham region in the 1930s through introducing the practice of burning cane before harvesting. He later became superintendent of Ingham Hospital.
