= Frank Macky =

Australian rules footballer

Personal information
- Full name: Frank Macky
- Born: 19 December 1891; Auckland, New Zealand
- Died: 29 December 1975 (aged 84); Auckland, New Zealand

Playing career^{1}
Years	Club	Games (Goals)
1911	University	7 (2)
- ^{1} Playing statistics correct to the end of 1911.

Frank Macky (19 December 1891 – 29 December 1975) was an Australian rules footballer who played with the Melbourne University Football Club in the Victorian Football League (VFL).

== Family ==
The son of Joseph Cochrane Macky (1855–1915), and Mary Macky (1858–1915), née Birrell, Frank Macky was born at Auckland, New Zealand on 19 December 1891.

Both his parents were drowned on 7 May 1915 when the British ocean liner RMS Lusitania was sunk by the German U-Boat SM U-20. Although offered a seat on a lifeboat, Mary Macky gave her seat to a younger woman, choosing to remain with her husband.

He married Barbara Allan Taylor (1916–1975), at Cambridge, New Zealand on 2 March 1916.

== Football ==
In 1911 he played in seven matches in the VFL competition with the University First XVIII: the first, against Essendon on 27 May 1911, and the last, against Melbourne on 26 August 1911.

== Education ==
Educated at New College, Box Hill, he studied medicine at the University of Melbourne (whilst a resident at Ormond College), and graduated Bachelor of Medicine, Bachelor of Surgery in April 1914.

== Military service ==
He enlisted in the Royal Australian Army Medical Corps on 17 July 1915. and served overseas in the Middle East and in Europe.

== Medical career ==
In May 1914 he applied for registration as a medical practitioner in Auckland, New Zealand.

For a number of years he was the president of the Auckland Branch of the British Medical Association.

== Sources ==
- World War One Embarkation Roll: Captain Frank Macky, Collection of the Australian War Memorial.
- World War One Nominal Roll: Major Frank Macky, Collection of the Australian War Memorial.
- World War One Service Record: Major Frank Macky, National Archives of Australia.
