= Ray Whitford =

Australian rules footballer

Personal information
- Full name: Raymond S. Whitford
- Born: 5 November 1889
- Died: 12 January 1970 (aged 80)
- Original team: Melbourne Grammar

Playing career^{1}
Years	Club	Games (Goals)
1911	University	3 (0)
- ^{1} Playing statistics correct to the end of 1911.

Ray Whitford (5 November 1889 – 12 January 1970) was an Australian rules footballer who played with University.

== Sources ==
- Holmesby, Russell & Main, Jim (2007). The Encyclopedia of AFL Footballers. 7th ed. Melbourne: Bas Publishing.
- Ray Whitford's playing statistics from AFL Tables
- Ray Whitford at AustralianFootball.com
