= John Gunter (footballer) =

Australian rules footballer (1883–1963)

Personal information
- Full name: John Gunter
- Born: 29 August 1883
- Died: 23 January 1963 (aged 79)
- Original team: Innisfail (Victoria)
- Height: 179 cm (5 ft 10 in)
- Weight: 83 kg (183 lb)

Playing career^{1}
Years	Club	Games (Goals)
1911	Carlton	1 (0)
- ^{1} Playing statistics correct to the end of 1911.

John Gunter (29 August 1883 – 23 January 1963) was an Australian rules footballer who played with Carlton in the Victorian Football League (VFL).
