= William Armstrong (footballer) =

Australian rules footballer, born 1892

Personal information
- Full name: William Louther Armstrong
- Born: 19 April 1892; Albert Park, Victoria
- Died: 12 March 1968 (aged 75); Newtown, Victoria
- Original team: Wesley College

Playing career^{1}
Years	Club	Games (Goals)
1911	University	3 (0)
- ^{1} Playing statistics correct to the end of 1911.

William Louther Armstrong (19 April 1892 – 12 March 1968) was a qualified medical practitioner and an Australian rules footballer.

== Family ==
The son of William Louther Armstrong (1860-1936), and Catherine Armstrong (1868-1941), née Anstey, William Louther Armstrong was born at Albert Park, Victoria on 19 April 1892.

He married Nita Elizabeth Hunter (1890-1973) on 14 November 1918.

== Education ==
He attended Wesley College.

== Football ==
Armstrong only played one season of Victorian Football League football, in 1911 for University. He played only three games in his short career, and was an ex-Wesley College player.

== Military service ==
He served in the First AIF.

== Medical practitioner ==
After leaving the army he worked for many years in Shepparton as a medical practitioner.
