= Robert Thompson (Australian footballer, born 1891) =

Australian rules footballer

Personal information
- Full name: Robert William Thompson
- Born: 5 March 1891; Richmond, Victoria
- Died: 8 February 1918 (aged 26); Fitzroy, Victoria
- Original team: St Patrick's College, Ballarat

Playing career^{1}
Years	Club	Games (Goals)
1911, 1913	University	14 (6)
- ^{1} Playing statistics correct to the end of 1913.

Robert William Thompson (5 March 1891 – 8 February 1918) was an Australian rules footballer who played with Melbourne University Football Club in the Victorian Football League (VFL).

From the Victorian town of Cobden, he died at age 26 in 1918 after a suffering a brain tumour.

Thompson's uncle Joe Forgan played for St Kilda prior to the formation of the Victorian Football League.
