= Allan McCracken =

Australian rules footballer (1889–1967)

Personal information
- Full name: Robert Alexander Allan McCracken
- Born: 13 April 1889; Essendon, Victoria
- Died: 28 June 1967 (aged 78); Malvern, Victoria
- Original team: Scotch College

Playing career^{1}
Years	Club	Games (Goals)
1911–1912	University	22 (8)
- ^{1} Playing statistics correct to the end of 1912.

Robert Alexander "Allan" McCracken (13 April 1889 – 28 June 1967) was an Australian rules footballer who played for the University Football Club in the Victorian Football League (VFL).

After leaving Scotch College in 1910, McCracken studied to qualify as an architect at the University of Melbourne and while studying played 22 games for the university team in the VFL.

In August 1914 McCracken enlisted to serve in World War I at Prahran, and shortly before embarking on HMAT Orivieto for overseas in October, he married Mabel Geraldine Fitzgerald. He landed at Gallipoli with the machine gun section of the 5th Battalion, fought at Cape Helles and took part in the Battle of Krithia. After the Gallipoli evacuation he was given a commission in the 57th Battalion but he returned to Australia after being shot in the face while fighting near Fleurbaix in France, and was discharged in January 1917.
