= Reg McGillicuddy =

Australian rules footballer

Personal information
- Full name: Reginald Patrick MacGillicuddy
- Born: 24 July 1891; Richmond, Victoria
- Died: 26 January 1922 (aged 30); Cunnamulla, Queensland
- Original team: Xavier College

Playing career^{1}
Years	Club	Games (Goals)
1911	University	2 (0)
- ^{1} Playing statistics correct to the end of 1911.

Reginald Patrick MacGillicuddy (24 July 1891 – 26 January 1922) was an Australian rules footballer who played with University in the Victorian Football League in 1911.

Reg MacGillicuddy was the son of Irish-catholic parents, Dr Daniel Florance MacGillicuddy and Mary Anne Meaney, who lived in Richmond, in Melbourne's inner east. He attended the prestigious Xavier College, excelling at rowing, cricket and football.

McGillicuddy enrolled at the University of Melbourne in 1911, studying medicine, and while in his first year he made his VFL debut with the university team in Round 13, 15 July 1911, against Carlton Football Club at Carlton's home ground Princes Park. University lost by 44 points and McGillicuddy was omitted from the university side until Round 16, when he returned to play against Collingwood at the Melbourne Cricket Ground (MCG), which Collingwood won 14.14 (98) to 0.9 (9). It would prove to be University's lowest ever score in the VFL, as well as its biggest ever defeat. McGillicuddy was omitted from University's team and did not play again.

Following his graduation from Medical School, Dr McGillicuddy enlisted in World War I and served as captain in the Australian Army Medical Corps Hospital Transport Corps at Suez Canal in 1917–18 as part of the Sinai and Palestine campaign but was discharged due to chronic cough.

Upon his return from war McGillicuddy married stage performer Goodie Reeve and moved to Queensland, where their daughter Patricia Mary "Yuki" was born. McGillicuddy died in Cunnamulla, Queensland in 1922, aged 30.

== Sources ==
- Cullen, B. (2015) Harder than football: league players at war, Slattery Media Group: Richmond, Victoria. ISBN 978-0-9923791-4-8.
- Holmesby, R. & Main, J. (2014) The Encyclopedia of AFL Footballers: every AFL/VFL player since 1897 (10th ed.), Bas Publishing: Melbourne, Victoria. ISBN 978-1-921496-32-5.
