= Clifton Tucker =

Australian rules footballer

Personal information
- Full name: Clifton Eric Tucker
- Born: 21 March 1888; Balwyn, Victoria
- Died: 3 September 1973 (aged 85); Queensland
- Original team: Carlton District

Playing career^{1}
Years	Club	Games (Goals)
1911	University	1 (1)
- ^{1} Playing statistics correct to the end of 1911.

Clifton Eric Tucker (21 March 1888 – 3 September 1973) was an Australian rules footballer who played with University in the Victorian Football League (VFL).

== Sources ==
- Holmesby, Russell; Main, Jim (2014). The Encyclopedia of AFL Footballers: every AFL/VFL player since 1897 (10th ed.). Melbourne, Victoria: Bas Publishing. p. 895. ISBN 978-1-921496-32-5.
- Clifton Tucker's playing statistics from AFL Tables
- Clifton Tucker at AustralianFootball.com
