= Wally Graham =

Australian rules footballer

Personal information
- Full name: Walter David Graham
- Born: 21 October 1889; Richmond, Victoria
- Died: 29 March 1965 (aged 75); South Yarra, Victoria
- Original team: Brighton (VFA)

Playing career^{1}
Years	Club	Games (Goals)
1911	St Kilda	8 (0)
- ^{1} Playing statistics correct to the end of 1911.

Walter David Graham (21 October 1889 – 29 March 1965) was an Australian rules footballer who played with St Kilda in the Victorian Football League (VFL).
