= Dave Mahoney =

Australian rules footballer

Personal information
- Full name: David Joseph Mahoney
- Born: 30 May 1892; Kilmore, Victoria
- Died: 29 March 1947 (aged 54)
- Height: 168 cm (5 ft 6 in)
- Weight: 64 kg (141 lb)

Playing career^{1}
Years	Club	Games (Goals)
1911	Richmond	2 (1)
- ^{1} Playing statistics correct to the end of 1911.

David Joseph Mahoney (30 May 1892 – 29 March 1947) was an Australian rules footballer who played with Richmond in the Victorian Football League (VFL).
