= Bill Hickey (footballer, born 1886) =

Australian rules footballer

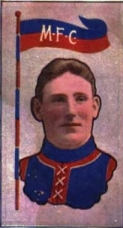

Personal information
- Full name: William Davitt Parnell Hickey
- Born: 28 January 1886; Adelaide, South Australia
- Died: 16 August 1973 (aged 87); East Melbourne, Victoria
- Original team: South Ballarat

Playing career^{1}
Years	Club	Games (Goals)
1911–12	Melbourne	20 (1)
- ^{1} Playing statistics correct to the end of 1912.

William Davitt Parnell Hickey (28 January 1886 – 16 August 1973) was an Australian rules footballer who played with Melbourne in the Victorian Football League (VFL).
