= Charlie Naismith =

Australian rules footballer

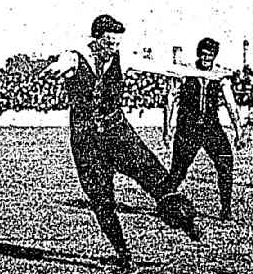

Personal information
- Full name: Charles Ernest Naismith
- Born: 31 May 1881; Prahran, Victoria
- Died: 2 November 1964 (aged 83); Blackburn, Victoria
- Original team: Clifton Hill

Playing career^{1}
Years	Club	Games (Goals)
1902, 1906–07	Fitzroy	29 (30)
- ^{1} Playing statistics correct to the end of 1907.

Charles Ernest Naismith OBE (31 May 1881 – 2 November 1964) was an Australian rules footballer who played with Fitzroy. He was the twin brother of Wally Naismith.

After his football career, he worked in the dairy industry and was appointed an Officer of the Order of the British Empire in January 1954 for his services to the industry.
