= Tom Moloughney (footballer) =

Australian rules footballer

Personal information
- Full name: Thomas Moloughney
- Born: 8 October 1888; Melbourne, Victoria
- Died: 27 July 1977 (aged 88); Brighton, Victoria
- Original team: Leopold (MJFA)
- Height: 170 cm (5 ft 7 in)

Playing career^{1}
Years	Club	Games (Goals)
1911	Fitzroy	1 (0)
1915	St Kilda	1 (0)
Total		2 (0)
- ^{1} Playing statistics correct to the end of 1915.

Tom Moloughney (8 October 1888 – 27 July 1977) was an amateur athlete and an Australian rules footballer who played with Fitzroy and St Kilda in the Victorian Football League (VFL).

== Family ==
The son of Thomas Moloughney (-1923), and Margaret Moloughney (-1914), née Quan, Thomas Moloughney was born at Melbourne on 8 October 1888.

He married Bessie Harris Tyack (1888-1975), at Hawthorn, Victoria, on 28 April 1917.

== Football ==
=== Fitzroy (VFL) ===
Recruited from Melbourne Junior Football Association (MJFA) club Leopold, Moloughney made his debut in Round 1 of the 1911 VFL season.

=== St Kilda (VFL) ===
Recruited from CYMS Football Association club South Melbourne C.Y.M.S., he played in one match for the St Kilda First XVIII, against Melbourne, at the Junction Oval, on 29 May 1915.

== Death ==
He died at Brighton, Victoria on 27 July 1977.
