= Ken MacLeod (disambiguation) =

Ken MacLeod is a Scottish science fiction writer.

Ken MacLeod or Ken McLeod may also refer to:

- Ken McLeod (born 1948), Buddhist teacher
- Ken McLeod (cricketer) (born 1964), Jamaican cricketer
- K. G. MacLeod (Kenneth Grant MacLeod, 1888–1967), Scottish cricketer
- Ken MacLeod (Australian footballer) (1890–1940), Australian rules footballer
- K. G. MacLeod (1888–1967), known as Ken, Scottish international rugby union player
- Kenneth McLeod (1858–1940), politician in Alberta, Canada
- Kenneth G. McLeod (born 1962), Christian apologist and radio talk show host
- Kenneth P. MacLeod (1923–2001), American politician from Maine, USA
- Kenneth R. MacLeod (born 1955), former politician in New Brunswick, Canada
- Kenneth Roy MacLeod (1927–2011), judge and politician in Saskatchewan, Canada

== See also ==
- Donald Kenneth McLeod (1885–1958), officer in the British Indian Army
