= Bill Madden (footballer) =

Australian rules footballer (1881–1917)

Personal information
- Full name: William Charles Madden
- Born: 18 November 1881; North Melbourne, Victoria
- Died: 3 May 1917 (aged 35); Bullecourt, France
- Original team: West Melbourne

Playing career^{1}
Years	Club	Games (Goals)
1908–1909	St Kilda	26 (14)
- ^{1} Playing statistics correct to the end of 1909.

William Charles Madden (18 November 1881 – 3 May 1917) was an Australian rules footballer who played for St Kilda. He was killed whilst in action in France in 1917.

== Family ==
The son of Daniel Madden (1839–1914), and Margaret Madden (1846–1919), née Cannon, William Charles Madden was born in Hotham, now known as North Melbourne, on 18 November 1881.

He was married in 1904; and he and his wife, Dorothea Harriett Madden (?–1942), née Surguy, had two children, Priscilla Victoria Madden, and William Leonard Madden.

== Football ==
=== West Melbourne (VFA) ===
Having made his debut in the 7 June 1902 match against Brunswick, he played in 84 games over six seasons (1902 to 1907) for the West Melbourne Football Club in the Victorian Football Association (VFA), and kicked 4 goals.

=== St Kilda (VFL) ===
At 26 years of age, he was cleared to St Kilda, from West Melbourne on 29 April 1908.

He played his first senior match, in the first round, against Carlton, at Princes Park on 2 May 1908. Of the three St Kilda debutants, Madden, Bismarck Kulpa, and Alby Landt, he was considered to be "the most promising" of all the new St Kilda players. Although not a tall man, he played as a Backman, a forward, and a Ruckman, with an equally high level of skill and performance during his senior VFL career.

In his first season at St Kilda (1908) he played in every senior match, including the Semi-Final against Carlton, at the M.C.G. on 19 September 1908. Carlton thrashed St Kilda, by 58 points (12.12 (84) to 3.8 (26), Madden was selected as the forward pocket resting Ruckman for St Kilda. The match was played in extremely wet and muddy conditions, and the umpiring was of such a poor standard that St Kilda lodged a complaint.

In his second season (1909) he only played seven matches, the last of which, against Melbourne at the Junction Oval on 24 July 1908 (round thirteen) was only possible because he was needed to replace an unavailable player.

=== Footscray (VFA) ===
Cleared from St Kilda in April 1910 to the Footscray Football Club in the Victorian Football Association (VFA), he played in 21 games over two seasons (1910 to 1911), and kicked 19 goals.

== Cricket ==
He was also the wicket-keeper for the Brunswick Cricket Club.

== Military service ==
Prior to enlisting in the First AIF on 30 March 1916, he had been employed as a tinsmith.

== Death ==
He was declared "missing in action" in May 1917; and his name appeared in the list of missing issued in June 1917.

He was finally (officially) declared "Killed in Action" on 26 November 1917 after a Court of Inquiry had conducted an investigation into his case, although the relevant casualty list was not published until February 1918.

He has no known grave, and is commemorated at the Villers–Bretonneux Australian National Memorial.

== See also ==
- List of Victorian Football League players who died on active service
