= Richard Clough (disambiguation) =

Richard Clough was a merchant.

Richard Clough may refer to:

- Richard Clough, High Sheriff of Denbighshire 1787
- Richard Clough (journalist) on Los Angeles Business Journal
- Dick Clough (1884–1915), Australian rules footballer

== See also ==
- Richard Clough Anderson Sr.
- Richard Clough Anderson Jr.
