= List of Victorian Football League players who died on active service =

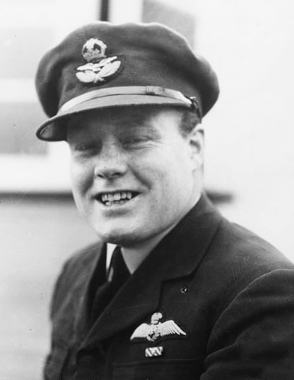
Keith Truscott

Since the inception of the Victorian Football League in 1897, many of its players have served in the armed services, including the Anglo–Boer War, World War I, World War II, the Korean War (in which Melbourne's Geoff Collins served as a fighter pilot), and the Vietnam War (in which Essendon's Keith Gent, Lindsay McGie, and Ian Payne, and Geelong's Wayne Closter all served).

A number of the VFL players who served also lost their lives on active service; they were either killed in action, or died as a consequence of the wounds, injuries, and/or illnesses they had suffered in their active service.

According to Main & Allen (2002, p. x), "no VFL footballer was killed in any wars other than the Anglo–Boer War and the two World Wars".

== Anglo–Boer War ==
Charlie Moore and Stan Reid, the only two VFL players to be killed in the Anglo–Boer War, had played against each other in the 1898 VFL Grand Final.

Reid had played in the back pocket for Fitzroy and was one of Fitzroy's best players, whilst Moore had played at full-forward for Essendon. Fitzroy won the match 5.8 (38) to 3.5 (23), with Moore kicking one of Essendon's three goals.

Moore had already played a number of senior games for Albert-Park Football Club (and, possibly, also for the South Melbourne Football Club) in the VFA before moving to play for Essendon in the VFL's inaugural year of 1897, whilst Stan Reid had played quite a number of senior games for the Fitzroy Football Club in the VFA prior to 1897.

Player	VFL Games	VFL club(s)	Rank held at time of death	Date of death	Location
Charlie Moore	30	Essendon	Trooper, 4th Victorian Imperial; Bushmen's Contingent	12 May 1901	Kwaggashoek Farm, South Africa
Stan Reid	24	Fitzroy	Lieutenant, 6th Western Australian; Mounted Infantry	29 June 1901	Middel-Kraal, South Africa

== World War I ==
It can never be definitively argued that any particular person was "the first VFL footballer killed in the First World War" due to at least six former VFL footballers being killed during the chaos of the landing at Anzac Cove on Sunday, 25 April 1915—Lieutenant Joseph Rupert "Rupert" Balfe (University), Private Joseph Alan "Alan" Cordner (Geelong and Collingwood), Private Claude Terrell Crowl (St Kilda), Private Charles "Charlie" Fincher (South Melbourne), Private Fenley John "Fen" McDonald (Carlton and Melbourne), and Corporal Arthur Mueller "Joe" Pearce (Melbourne).

Player	VFL games	VFL club(s)	Rank held at time of death	Date of death	Location
James Aitken	1	Geelong	Private, 5th Battalion, First A.I.F.	8 August 1915	Gallipoli, Turkey
Rupert Balfe	7	University	Lieutenant, 6th Battalion, First A.I.F.	25 April 1915	Gallipoli, Turkey
John Bell	18	Geelong	Captain, No. 2 Squadron, Australian Flying Corps	27 December 1917	Western Front, France
Lewis Blackmore	7	Essendon	Second Lieutenant, 1st Battalion, First A.I.F.	23 July 1916	Pozières, France
Jim Bonella	1	Melbourne	Private; 2nd Battalion Australian Machine Gun Corps	24 May 1918	France
Norman Bradford	7	South Melbourne	Corporal, 23rd Battalion, First A.I.F.	4 August 1916	Pozières, France
Cliff Burge	5	Melbourne	Lieutenant, 24th Battalion, First A.I.F.	14 August 1918	Villers-Bretonneux, France
Arthur Caldwell	8	St Kilda	Private, 4th Battalion, First A.I.F.	26 July 1915	Valletta, Malta
Sam Campbell	1	Collingwood	Private; Australian Reinforcement	21 October 1918	Sierra Leone
Hughie Callan	71	Essendon; South Melbourne	Private, 14th Battalion, First A.I.F.	5 February 1917	Bapaume, France
George Challis	70	Carlton	Sergeant, 58th Battalion, First A.I.F.	15 July 1916	Armentières, France
Thornton Clarke	4	Fitzroy	Corporal, 60th Battalion, First A.I.F.	19 July 1916	Fromelles, France
Dick Clough	2	Essendon	Corporal, 5th Australian Light Horse Regiment	2 June 1915	Gallipoli, Turkey
Harry Collins; DCM	6	Fitzroy	Lieutenant, 6th Battalion, First A.I.F.	10 August 1918	Villers-Bretonneux, France
Jack Cooper	136	Fitzroy	Lance-Corporal, 8th Battalion, First A.I.F.	20 September 1917	Polygon Wood, Belgium
Arch Corbett	7	University	Captain, Australian Army; Medical Corps, First A.I.F.	25 June 1920	Lost at sea off Toulon, France
Alan Cordner	23	Geelong; Collingwood	Private, 6th Battalion, First A.I.F.	25 April 1915	Gallipoli, Turkey
Claude Crowl	3	St Kilda	Private, 8th Battalion, First A.I.F.	25 April 1915	Gallipoli, Turkey
Joe Crowl	3	Geelong	Captain, 8th Australian, Light Horse, First A.I.F.	27 June 1915	Gallipoli, Turkey
Dave Cumming; MC and Bar	21	University	Captain, 48th Battalion, First A.I.F.	3 May 1918	Villers-Bretonneux, France
Harry Daniel	11	Carlton	Private; 5th Battalion (Infantry)	10 August 1918	France
Jack Doubleday	53	University; Melbourne	Lieutenant, Australian; Dental Corps, First A.I.F.	30 October 1918	Died at sea, Indian Ocean
George Elliott; MC	80	Fitzroy; University	Captain, Australian Army; Medical Corps, First A.I.F.	25 September 1917	Chateau Wood, Ypres, France
Jim Farnan	1	St Kilda	Private; 46th Battalion (Infantry)	9 August 1916	France
Fred Fielding	18	South Melbourne; Collingwood	Private, 28th Battalion, First A.I.F.	8 August 1918	Villers-Bretonneux, France
Charlie Fincher	9	South Melbourne	Private, 5th Battalion, First A.I.F.	25 April 1915	Gallipoli, Turkey
Bill Fischer	1	Melbourne	Sergeant; 8th Brigade Australian Field Artillery	15 October 1917	Belgium
Chris Fogarty	28	Essendon; University	Lieutenant, 24th Battalion, First A.I.F.	29 November 1915	Gallipoli, Turkey
Jack Freeman	22	South Melbourne	Sapper, 2nd Field; Company, Australian; Engineers, First A.I.F.	15 November 1916	Rouen, France
Dick Gibbs; MC	35	University	Captain, 59th Battalion, First A.I.F.	19 July 1916	Fleurbaix, France
Dave Gillespie	5	Carlton	Company Sergeant Major, 59th Battalion, First A.I.F.	27 March 1917	Military Hospital; Caulfield, Victoria
Jimmy Gordon	8	Essendon	Bombardier, 3rd AFA Brigade, Australian Field Artillery	30 September 1918	France
Albert Gourlay	6	Carlton; Melbourne	Private, Wellington Infantry Regiment, New Zealand Expeditionary Force	15 August 1917	Military Hospital, England
Artie Harrison	20	Richmond; Fitzroy	Lance-Corporal, 22nd Battalion, First A.I.F.	3 May 1917	Bullecourt; France
Ed Harrison	7	South Melbourne	Sergeant, 24th Battalion, First A.I.F.	13 March 1917	Étaples; France
Billy Harvey	9	Essendon	Captain; 1st Pioneer Battalion	14 September 1917	Belgium
Arthur Hinman	24	University	Lieutenant, 15th Battalion, First A.I.F.	10 May 1915	Gallipoli, Turkey
Lou Holmes	1	St Kilda	Captain, 10th Battalion, First A.I.F.	23 June 1915	Gallipoli, Turkey
Herb Hunter	3	Essendon	Captain, 7th Battalion, First A.I.F.	8 May 1915	Gallipoli, Turkey
Les James	72	Geelong	Private, 14th Battalion, First A.I.F.	22 October 1917	Passchendaele, Belgium
Arthur Jones	7	Fitzroy	Trooper, 8th Australian; Light Horse, First A.I.F.	7 August 1915	Gallipoli, Turkey
Malcolm Kennedy	17	Melbourne	Captain; Headquarters 1 Australian Division	2 January, 1918	Belgium
Bill Landy	2	Geelong	Private, 58th Battalion, First A.I.F.	19 July 1916	Fromelles, France
Charles Langtree	1	Collingwood	Lieutenant, 159th Brigade; Royal Field Artillery	3 August 1916	Corbie, France
Ron Larking; MC and Bar	1	University	Captain, 38th Division, Signal; Company, Royal Engineers	1 April 1918	Neuve-Église, Belgium
Les Lee	2	Richmond	Private, 10th Machine Gun; Company, First A.I.F.	8 June 1917	Messines, Belgium
Otto Lowenstern	12	St Kilda	Lord Strathcona's Horse (Royal Canadians)	1 December 1917	France
Frank Lugton	36	Melbourne	Lance-Corporal, 24th Battalion, First A.I.F.	29 July 1916	Villers-Bretonneux, France
Jim Mackie	5	Melbourne	Private, 21st Battalion, First A.I.F.	20 March 1917	Bapaume, France
Bill Madden	26	St Kilda	Lance Corporal; 22nd Battalion (Infantry)	3 May 1917	France
Peter Martin	15	Collingwood	Private, 6th Battalion, First A.I.F.	25 March 1918	Military Hospital; Caulfield, Victoria
Stan Martin	65	University	Corporal, 22nd Battalion, First A.I.F.	3 May 1917	Bullecourt; France
Bill Maxwell	2	Melbourne	Lieutenant, 38th Battalion, First A.I.F.	12 October 1917	Passchendaele, Belgium
Tom McCluskey	9	Carlton; Fitzroy	Private, 37th Battalion, First A.I.F.	4 October 1917	Passchendaele, Belgium
Fen McDonald	11	Carlton; Melbourne	Private, 37th Battalion, First A.I.F.	25 April 1915	Gallipoli, Turkey
Paddy McGuinness	1	St Kilda	Private; 51st Battalion (Infantry)	6 May 1918	France
Fred McIntosh	39	University; Essendon	Lieutenant, 59th Battalion, First A.I.F.	28 September 1917	Polygon Wood, Belgium
Arthur McKenzie	4	Geelong	Private, 1st Regiment; South African Infantry	18 July 1916	Delville Wood, France
Stan McKenzie	14	Carlton	Sergeant, 1st Australian; Clearing Hospital, First A.I.F.	8 December 1915	Alexandria, Egypt
Ted McLean	2	Geelong	Private, 8th Battalion, First A.I.F.	29 May 1915	Gallipoli, Turkey
Hector Mitchell	1	St Kilda	Stoker; HMAS Swan, R.A.N.	16 June 1917	Singapore
Charlie Morley	3	Essendon	Lieutenant, Australian Army Ordnance Corps	13 April 1919	London, England
Stan Neale; MC	28	University	Captain, 59th Battalion, First A.I.F.	29 September 1918	Bellicourt, France
Jim Nicholas	1	University	Lieutenant Colonel, 5th Australian Field Ambulance, Australian Army Medical Corps	20 September 1917	Belgium
Bill Nolan	30	Richmond	Sergeant, 58th Battalion, First A.I.F.	23 July 1916	Fleurbaix, France
Bert O'Connell	2	St Kilda	Private, 24h Battalion, First A.I.F.	17 October 1917	Broodseinde, Belgium
Sid O'Neill	1	Fitzroy	Sergeant, 8th Australian Light Horse	7 August 1915	Gallipoli, Turkey
Alick Ogilvie	28	Melbourne; University	Second Lieutenant, 12th Battalion, First A.I.F.	18 August 1915	Malta
Charlie Oliver	1	Carlton	Doctor; Australian Army Medical Corps	29 December 1917	Melbourne, Australia
Harold Parker	3	St Kilda	2nd Lieutenant; 37th Battalion (Infantry)	30 January 1917	France
Joe Pearce	152	Melbourne	Corporal, 7th Battalion, First A.I.F.	25 April 1915	Gallipoli, Turkey
Jim Pender	15	Carlton	Private, 14th Battalion, First A.I.F.	2 July 1916	Bois-Grenier, France
Hugh Plowman	26	St Kilda	Captain, 60th Battalion, First A.I.F.	19 July 1916	Fromelles, France
Leslie Primrose	16	University	Lieutenant, Australian Flying Corps	4 June 1918	The Somme, France
Leo Rankin	1	Melbourne	Private; 55th Australian Infantry Battalion	10 May 1917	Dorset, England
Harold Rippon	9	Melbourne; South Melbourne	Private; 2nd Pioneer Battalion	16 January 1917	France
Alex Robertson	10	University	Second Lieutenant, 11th Battalion, First A.I.F.	6 August 1915	Gallipoli, Turkey
Ralph Robertson	14	St Kilda	Second Lieutenant, Royal Flying Corps & Second Lieutenant, 8th Battalion, Hampshire Regiment	11 May 1917	Aboukir, Egypt
Percy Rodriguez	22	University; Melbourne	Second Lieutenant, 23rd Battalion, First A.I.F.	20 March 1917	The Somme, France
Bill Rogers	3	Carlton	Corporal, 3rd Battalion, Machine Gun Corps, First A.I.F.	22 September 1918	near Rouen, France
Les Rogers	3	Essendon	Private; 23rd Battalion (Infantry)	4 August 1916	France
Gower Ross	8	St Kilda	Second Lieutenant; 3rd Squadron Royal Flying Corps	14 February 1917	Gueudecourt, France
Paddy Rowan	82	Collingwood	Sergeant, 29th Battalion, First A.I.F.	5 December 1916	Western Front, France
Bobby Royle	3	Melbourne	Private; 2nd Company Machine Gun Corps	3 November 1916	France
Gerald Ryan	18	Essendon	Lance Sergeant, 14th Battalion, First A.I.F.	6 February 1917	Tidworth, Wiltshire, England
Cyril Seelenmeyer; MC	6	University	Major, Australian Army Veterinary Corps	8 August 1918	Fouilloy, Somme, France
Joe Slater	108	Geelong	Captain, 22nd Battalion, First A.I.F.	3 May 1917	Bullecourt; France
Bruce Sloss	84	Essendon; South Melbourne	Lieutenant, 10th Machine; Gun Company, First A.I.F.	4 January 1917	Armentières, France
Claude Thomas	13	South Melbourne	Private, 14th Battalion, First A.I.F.	5 July 1918	Hamel, France
Jack Turnbull	12	South Melbourne	Private, 39th Battalion, First A.I.F.	2 May 1917	Western Front, France
Jack Walker	4	St Kilda	Sergeant, 8th Battalion, First A.I.F.	27 July 1916	Pozières, France
Mal Williams	7	University	Lieutenant Colonel, 1st Field Ambulance, Australian Army Medical Corps	2 May 1917	The Somme, France
Alf Williamson	19	Carlton; Melbourne	Captain, 14th Battalion, First A.I.F.	11 April 1917	Bullecourt; France
Jack Wood	2	Essendon	Private; 6th Battalion, First A.I.F.	20 October 1914	Melbourne, Victoria
Tommy Worle	3	Collingwood	Sergeant, 8th Brigade; Australian Field Artillery	31 July 1917	Armentières, France
Tom Wright	12	Collingwood	Corporal; 59th Battalion (Infantry)	12 December 1916	France

== World War II ==
Player	VFL games	VFL club(s)	Rank held at time of death	Date of death	Location
Syd Anderson	53	Melbourne	Flying Officer, 100 Squadron, R.A.A.F.	20 May 1944	Shot down off Wewak, New Guinea
Jack Atkins	4	Melbourne	Able Seaman, HMAS Perth, Naval Reserve	1 March 1942	Sunda Strait, off Java
Wilf Atkinson	1	Carlton	Flight Sergeant R.A.A.F. attached to 232 Squadron, R.A.F.	12 August 1943	over Sicily
Harold Ball	33	Melbourne	Private, 2/9 Field Ambulance, Australian Army Medical Corps	9 February 1942	Singapore, Malaya
Ron Barassi Sr	58	Melbourne	Corporal, 7th Division Supply Column, Australian Army Service Corps	31 July 1941	Tobruk, Libya
Paul Bell	15	St Kilda	Lance Corporal, 2/5 Cavalry (Commando) Squadron, Second A.I.F.	4 July 1945	Balikpapan, Borneo
George Brock	4	North Melbourne	Leading Aircraftman R.A.A.F. 1 Service Flying Training School, Point Cook	2 August 1941	Air collision near the You Yangs, Victoria
Harry Comte	104	St Kilda	Private, 2/24th Battalion, Second A.I.F.	30 May 1945	Tarakan, Dutch East Indies
Tommy Corrigan	107	Fitzroy	Sergeant, 1 Recruit; Centre Melbourne, R.A.A.F.	9 January 1943	Heidelberg; Military Hospital
Bill Cosgrove	3	Richmond	Fight Sergeant, 30 Squadron, R.A.A.F.	11 August 1943	off Goodenough Island; Milne Bay
Bill Downie	69	Footscray; St Kilda	Private, 105 Transport Company, Australian Army Service Corps	11 September 1943	Burma-Siam railway Burma
Jack Drake	3	Hawthorn	Lance-Bombardier, 2/2 Field; Regiment, Royal Australian Artillery	23 April 1941	Bralos Pass; Thermopylae, Greece
Noel Ellis	3	Melbourne	Sergeant, 23rd Anti Tank Battery, Royal Australian Artillery	6 July 1942	Queensland
Bob Flegg	18	St Kilda	Warrant Officer R.A.A.F. attached to 70 Squadron, R.A.F.	7 July 1944	over Feuersbrunn, Austria
Bill Garvie	9	Richmond	Private, 20 Field Bakery Platoon, Australian Army Service Corps	27 June 1944	Atherton Tablelands, Far North Queensland
Alf Giblett	9	Hawthorn	Corporal, 2/24th Battalion, Second A.I.F.	19 June 1943	New Guinea
Godfrey Goldin	8	Essendon	Private, 2/7th Battalion, Second A.I.F.	7 February 1943	New Guinea
Alf Goonan	7	North Melbourne	Private, 2/29th Battalion, Second A.I.F.	22 January 1942	Malaya
Jeff Grieve	11	South Melbourne	Flight Sergeant, 667 Communication Unit 11 Base RAF; R.A.A.F	8 November 1944	Glen Shee, Scotland
Gordon Hamilton	2	South Melbourne	Ordinary Seaman, HMAS Cerberus; R.A.N.	23 February 1941	Chelsea, Victoria
Alf Hedge	16	South Melbourne	Pilot Officer, R.A.A.F. attached to 78 Squadron, R.A.F.	4 May 1942	over Hamburg, Germany
Fred Heintz	14	Fitzroy	Private, 2/21st Battalion, Second A.I.F.	20 February 1942	Ambon, Dutch East Indies
Clyde Helmer	73	Geelong; Melbourne	Warrant Officer Class II, Bomb Disposal Mobile Unit, Royal Australian Engineers	24 April 1945	whilst defusing bomb at Aitapi, near Lae, New Guinea
Bill Hudson	5	St Kilda	Lance Corporal, 51st Field Park Company, Royal Australian Engineers	11 April 1945	New Guinea
Len Johnson	69	Essendon; North Melbourne	Private, 4th Reserve Motor; Transport Company, Australian; Army Service Corps	24 January 1942	near Singapore, Malaya
Jack Keddie	1	Essendon	Sergeant, 127 Brigade Workshops, Australian Corps of Electrical and Mechanical Engineers	15 August 1945	Wewak, New Guinea
Stuart King	43	St Kilda	Flying Officer, 11 Squadron, R.A.A.F.	28 February 1943	off Cairns, Far North Queensland
Jim Knight	43	Geelong; Carlton	Flying Officer, 30 Squadron, R.A.A.F.	11 October 1943	Goodenough Island, Milne Bay
Ralph Lancaster	44	Geelong	Gunner, 9th Light; Anti-Aircraft Battery, Royal; Australian Artillery, Second A.I.F.	28 August 1942	New Guinea
Norm Le Brun	50	Carlton; Collingwood; Essendon; South Melbourne	Trooper, 2/10th Australian; Cavalry (Commando) Squadron	15 November 1944	Aitapi, near Lae, New Guinea
Jack Lynch	25	Geelong	Driver, 2/19th Transport Platoon, Australian Army Service Corps	8 September 1944	Charters Towers, Far North Queensland
Ken MacLeod	54	University	Engineer-Lieutenant Commander, HMS Glowworm, R.A.N.	8 April 1940	off Trondheim, Norway
Wallace Mills	1	St Kilda	Warrant Officer Class II, 2/41st Light Aid Detachment, Australian; Corps of Electrical and Mechanical Engineers	24 November 1943	Far North Queensland
Derek Mollison	66	Melbourne	Captain, 2/12th Field Regiment; 9th Division, Second A.I.F.	19 December 1943	Rockhampton, Central Queensland
Alex Nash; DFM	1	Hawthorn	Pilot Officer, 8 Squadron, R.A.A.F.	28 March 1944	off Bougainville Island, New Guinea
Norm Oliver	13	Collingwood	Flying Officer, 4 Squadron, R.A.A.F.	27 June 1944	Madang, New Guinea
Jim Park	128	Carlton	Lieutenant, 2/6th Infantry; Battalion, Second A.I.F.	9 February 1943	Wau, New Guinea
Alan Pearsall	2	South Melbourne	Flying Officer, R.A.A.F. (seconded to 16 Squadron, R.A.F.)	8 March 1944	over English; Channel
Bert Peters	17	North Melbourne	Flying Officer, R.A.A.F. 53 Squadron RAF	13 June 1944	Shot down over the English Channel
Dick Pirrie	3	Hawthorn	Sub-Lieutenant, HMS Invicta, Royal; Australian Naval Volunteer Reserve	6 June 1944	Normandy, France
Jack Price	10	Hawthorn	Private, 2/2nd Pioneer Battalion, Second A.I.F.	27 June 1941	Syria
Ted Regan	11	Melbourne; Essendon	Flight Sergeant, R.A.A.F. attached to 11 Squadron, R.A.F.	9 July 1943	over Burma
Beres Reilly	13	St Kilda; North Melbourne; Melbourne	Pilot Officer, 454 Squadron, R.A.A.F.	23 July 1943	over Crete
Archie Roberts	48	Essendon; Melbourne	Private, 2/21st Battalion, Second A.I.F.	6 June 1945	Ambon; Dutch East Indies
Percy Roberts	18	Fitzroy	Private, 85 Light Aid Detachment	3 August 1943	Burma
Tasman Roberts	58	St Kilda; Fitzroy	Private, 2/24th Battalion, Second A.I.F.	9 April 1942	Rabaul
Gordon Sawley	7	South Melbourne	Flying Officer R.A.A.F. attached to 19 Operational Training Unit, R.A.F.	14 August 1942	over Scotland
Mo Shapir	2	North Melbourne	Flight Sergeant, R.A.A.F. attached to 108 Squadron, R.A.F.	15 August 1942	Middle East
Jack Shelton	2	South Melbourne; St Kilda	Lieutenant, 2/21st Battalion, Second A.I.F.	1 May 1941	Libya
Len Thomas	209	North Melbourne; Hawthorn; South Melbourne	Private, 2/3rd Independent (Commando) Company, Second A.I.F.	17 August 1943	Salamaua, New Guinea
Henry Thomson	1	Carlton	Sergeant; AA Pay Corps	21 May 1943	Burma
Keith Truscott; DFC and Bar	50	Melbourne	Squadron Leader, 76 Squadron, R.A.A.F.	28 March 1943	Exmouth Gulf, Western Australia
Jack Wade	26	South Melbourne	Private, 2/27th Battalion, Second A.I.F.	11 June 1941	Syria
Max Wheeler	1	Hawthorn	Private, 2/2nd Pioneer; Battalion, Second A.I.F.	11 June 1941	Syria
Barney Wood	5	Melbourne	Sergeant, 2/16th Battalion, Second A.I.F.	9 June 1941	Litani River, Syria
Gus Young	10	Hawthorn	Bombardier, 3rd Australian; Light Anti Aircraft Regiment, Royal Australian Artillery	29 May 1941	at sea Middle East
Harold Zucker	3	Hawthorn	Corporal, A.I.F. General; 101 Hospital, Australian; Army Medical Corps	7 June 1947	Plympton, South Australia

== Umpires ==
At least one VFL umpire is known to have been killed: goal umpire Alexander Salton who served as a private in the 60th Battalion, First A.I.F. He died from his wounds on 10 September 1916 in France. He was shot in the stomach five days after joining his battalion, which had been comprehensively defeated two months before at the Battle of Fromelles. He is the only VFL field, boundary, or goal umpire known to have been killed on active service in any war.

In an unusual case, one VFL umpire, Henry James "Bunny" Nugent (1880–1955), served in three wars: the Boer War, World War I (wherein he was awarded the Military Cross for his bravery), and World War II (he had put his age back five years to enlist in 1939). In his first senior VFL match as field umpire back from his service in the First AIF (Richmond v. Essendon on Saturday, 11 May 1918), the Richmond and Essendon players lined up and formed a guard of honour for him to run through as he took the ground.

== See also ==
- The VFL during the World Wars
