= Arthur Jones (footballer, born 1891) =

Australian rules footballer

Personal information
- Full name: Arthur Montague Septimus Jones
- Born: 12 October 1891; Railton, Tasmania
- Died: 7 August 1915 (aged 23); Gallipoli, Ottoman Turkey
- Original team: Lefroy

Playing career^{1}
Years	Club	Games (Goals)
1914	Fitzroy	7 (3)
- ^{1} Playing statistics correct to the end of 1914.

Arthur Montague Septimus Jones was an Australian rules footballer who played for the Fitzroy Football Club in the Victorian Football League. He was killed on 7 August 1915 in Ottoman Turkey during World War I.

== Family ==
The son of Railton farmers Henry Jones and Martha Jones, née Wells, he was born on 12 October 1891.

== Football ==
He played for the Lefroy Football Club in 1912 and 1913. Recruited from Lefroy, he played in seven matches for the Fitzroy First XVIII in 1914; the first being the (round 2) match against Richmond, on 2 May 1914, when he took the place of an injured Artie Harrison.

== Military ==
He enlisted in the First AIF on 21 October 1914, and served in the 8th Australian Light Horse Regiment. He was killed in action on 7 August 1915 at Gallipoli.

== See also ==
- List of Victorian Football League players who died on active service
