= Lou Holmes =

Lou Holmes may refer to:

- Louis Holmes (1911–2010), ice hockey centre
- Lou Holmes (footballer) (1892–1915), Australian rules footballer
