= Giblett =

Giblett is a surname. Notable people with the surname include:

- Alf Giblett (1908–1943), Australian rules footballer
- Eloise Giblett (1921–2009), American geneticist and hematologist
- Michael Giblett (1934–1999), Australian rules footballer

== See also ==
- Gillett (surname)
