= Mal Kennedy =

Mal Kennedy may refer to:

- Malcolm Kennedy, a fictional character from the Australian soap opera Neighbours
- Malcolm Kennedy (footballer) (1892–1918), Australian rules footballer
