= Stan Neale =

Australian rules footballer

Personal information
- Full name: Stanley Walter Neale
- Born: 2 January 1894; Carlton, Victoria
- Died: 29 September 1918 (aged 24); Bellicourt, France
- Original team: Scotch College
- Position: Half back / Back pocket

Playing career^{1}
Years	Club	Games (Goals)
1913–14	University	28 (0)
- ^{1} Playing statistics correct to the end of 1914.

Stanley Walter Neale MC (1894–1918) was an Australian rules footballer who played with University in the Victorian Football League. He studied law at the University of Melbourne before enlisting in the army for World War I. Awarded the Military Cross for bravery, he was killed by a shell in France in 1918.

== See also ==
- List of Victorian Football League players who died on active service

== Sources ==
- Holmesby, Russell & Main, Jim (2007). The Encyclopedia of AFL Footballers. 7th ed. Melbourne: Bas Publishing.
- Stan Neale's playing statistics from AFL Tables
