= Beres Reilly =

Australian rules footballer

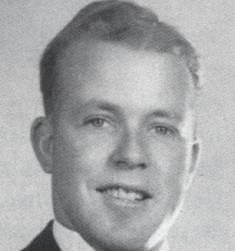

Personal information
- Full name: Beresford Stanley Reilly
- Born: 17 September 1914; South Melbourne, Victoria
- Died: 23 July 1943 (aged 28); Ierapetra, Crete
- Original team: Sixth Scouts
- Height: 178 cm (5 ft 10 in)
- Weight: 71 kg (157 lb)
- Position: Wing / Rover

Playing career^{1}
Years	Club	Games (Goals)
1935–1936	North Melbourne	8 (2)
1937	Melbourne	3 (1)
1938	St Kilda	2 (0)
Total		13 (3)
- ^{1} Playing statistics correct to the end of 1938.

Beresford Stanley "Beres" Reilly (17 September 1914 – 23 July 1943) was an Australian rules footballer who played for the North Melbourne Football Club, Melbourne Football Club and St Kilda Football Club in the Victorian Football League (VFL).

== Family ==
The third of the five children of William John Reilly (1882–1964), and Winifred Frances Reilly (1886–1964), née Knopp, Beresford Stanley Reilly was born at South Melbourne, Victoria on 17 September 1914.

He married Mary Margaret Purves on 4 January 1941.

== Football ==
Representing a Victorian schoolboys team, he tried out for the Footscray Football Club. He wasn't given a game and as such moved on to North Melbourne.

== Military service ==
He was a good friend of Keith Truscott, who was also killed in World War II. Serving as a Pilot Officer in the RAAF, Reilly was killed when his Martin Baltimore aircraft crashed over Crete. All 4 on board died in the crash.

== See also ==
- List of Victorian Football League players who died on active service
