= Bob Flegg =

Australian rules footballer (1918–1944)

Personal information
- Full name: Robert Barnes Flegg
- Born: 19 August 1918; Sandringham, Victoria
- Died: 7 July 1944 (aged 25) over Feuersbrunn, Grafenwörth, Austria
- Original team: Sandringham
- Height: 178 cm (5 ft 10 in)
- Weight: 77 kg (170 lb)

Playing career^{1}
Years	Club	Games (Goals)
1941	St Kilda	18 (47)
- ^{1} Playing statistics correct to the end of 1941.

Robert Barnes Flegg (19 August 1918 – 7 July 1944) was an Australian rules footballer who played with St Kilda in the Victorian Football League.

== Family ==
The son of William Ernest Flegg (1882–1951), and Grace Pearl Flegg (1886–1967), née Walsh, Robert Barnes Flegg was born at Sandringham, Victoria on 19 August 1918.

He married Leslie Mavis Smith (1919–1965), later Mrs. Clarence Wilbur Henry Harvey, in 1941.

== Football ==
=== Ormond (VAFA) ===
He played for several seasons with Ormond Amateur Football Club in the Victorian Amateur Football Association (VAFA). He scored 130 goals in the 1937 season, and won the club's "Best Recruit" award.

=== Sandringham (VFA) ===
Recruited from Ormond, he played for Sandringham First XVIII in the last five home-and-away matches for the 1940 VFA season, and the first three matches of the 1941 season.

=== St Kilda ===
Cleared from Sandringham on 23 April 1941, he played in all eighteen of the 1941 season's home-and-away matches with the St Kilda First XVIII. He was St Kilda's top goal scorer in 1941, with a total of 47 goals for the season (including 7 goals in rounds 2 and 5, 6 goals in round 4, and 5 goals in rounds 3 and 13).

"At Ormond, Bob Flegg gained a high reputation as a full-forward. After the Amateur competition was abandoned, Flegg crossed to Sandringham, and this season came to St. Kilda. He seems to have solved their worries about the full-forward position.
Strangely, they were not convinced at St. Kilda, before the season opened, that Flegg could fill the position. However, he has done everything to show them they were mistaken.
The feature of his work is his leading out for passes. Provided St. Kilda can give him the ball as he likes it and make the fullest use of his leading, he will get them a bag of goals. He is second on the goal-kickers' list with 19 goals to Sel Murray's 24." -- The Sporting Globe, 21 May 1941.

== Military service ==
He enlisted in the Royal Australian Air Force in World War II on 5 December 1941.

== Death ==
He was killed when his plane was shot down over Feuersbrunn in the Grafenwörth district of Austria on 7 July 1944.

He was buried at the British War Cemetery at Klagenfurt, in Austria.

== See also ==
- List of Victorian Football League players who died on active service
