= Alf Hedge =

Australian rules footballer

Personal information
- Full name: Alfred William Hedge
- Born: 29 October 1917, Victoria, Australia
- Died: 4 May 1942 (aged 24); Free City of Hamburg, Nazi Germany
- Original team: Sandringham Amateurs
- Position: Wing / rover

Playing career^{1}
Years	Club	Games (Goals)
1937–1938	South Melbourne	16 (3)
1940	Sandringham (VFA)	12 (5)
- ^{1} Playing statistics correct to the end of 1938.

Alfred William Hedge (29 October 1917 – 4 May 1942) was an Australian rules footballer who played for the South Melbourne Football Club in the Victorian Football League (VFL), and for Sandringham Football Club in the Victorian Football Association (VFA).

He was killed in action serving as a RAAF bomber pilot, serving with the RAF in the Second World War.

== Family ==
The only son of Alfred Hedge and Ethel May Hedge née Hume, he was born on 29 October 1917. He was educated at Sandringham State School and Hampton High School. He married Gwynneth Maie Foster in Ormond, Victoria on 11 January 1941. She remarried more than four years after Hedge's death on active service, becoming Mrs. Daniel Hunter Owen.

== Cricket ==
He played sub-district cricket for a number of years (1933–1939) for the Brighton Second XI.

== Football ==
=== South Melbourne ===
Having been awarded the trophy as the team's "best first season player" for the 1935 season, he was recruited from Sandringham Amateurs in 1937, and was immediately noticed for his accurate disposal.

=== Sandringham ===
Having spent 1939 playing for the South Melbourne Second XVIII, he was cleared from South Melbourne to Sandringham in April 1940, having applied for the transfer a year earlier.

== Military service ==
Hedge enlisted in 1940, and served as a bomber pilot for the Royal Australian Air Force during World War II.

== Death ==
He was killed when his plane (78 Squadron Halifax W7662) was shot down over Germany in May 1942.

Six of the seven crew perished when the aircraft – detailed to bomb Hamburg, Germany – was shot down by German flak and crashed at Lüneburg Heath. One of the engines caught fire and Hedge ordered the crew to abandon the aircraft. The rear gunner was able to leave the aircraft by parachute; he saw one of the wings come off the aircraft before it crashed – which, in his view, accounted for the failure of the rest of the crew to escape the aircraft – and, upon landing he was taken prisoner of war.

The six who perished, including both Hedge and another RAAF officer, Pilot Officer Gerald Ware Copeland (406548), who was the mid upper gunner, were all buried at Ohlsdorf Cemetery.

== See also ==
- List of Victorian Football League players who died on active service

== Sources ==
- Holmesby, Russell & Main, Jim (2007). The Encyclopedia of AFL Footballers. 7th ed. Melbourne: Bas Publishing.
- Alf Hedge's playing statistics from AFL Tables
- Roll of Honour: Alfred William Hedge (400588), Australian War Memorial.
- Alfred William Hedge entry at the Commonwealth War Graves Commission
- World War II Nominal Roll: RAAF: Hedge, Alfred William (400588).
- Victorians in RAAF Casualty List: Overseas: Previously Reported Missing, Now Presumed Dead, The Argus, (Wednesday, 28 October 1942), p.5.
- The Roll of Honor, The Age, (Wednesday 31 March 1943), p.5.
- The Roll of Honor, The Age, (Tuesday 6 April 1943), p.6.
