= Norm Bradford =

Australian rules footballer

Norman Bradford

Personal information
- Full name: Alfred Norman Bradford
- Born: 17 August 1894; Ascot Vale, Victoria
- Died: 4 August 1916 (aged 21); Pozières, France
- Original team: Yarraville

Playing career^{1}
| Years | Club | Games (Goals) |
| 1915 | South Melbourne | 7 (9) |
- ^{1} Playing statistics correct to the end of 1915.

Alfred Norman Bradford (14 August 1894 – 4 August 1916) was an Australian rules footballer who played with South Melbourne in the Victorian Football League.

== Family ==
Son of Alfred David Bradford (1858-1941), and Margaret Mary Bradford (1865-1946), née Thompson, Alfred Norman Bradford was born at Ascot Vale, Victoria on 14 August 1894.

== Football ==
Recruited from Yarraville Football Club in the Metropolitan Junior Football Association (MJFA), he played 7 senior games with South Melbourne in 1915.

His first match for the South Melbourne First XVIII was against St Kilda on 24 April 1915, and his seventh and last match, prior to his enlistment was against Fitzroy on 24 July 1915.

== Military service ==
He enlisted in the First AIF in July 1915; and, leaving Australia on the HMAT Ulysses (A38) on 27 October 1915, he served overseas in the Australian Imperial Force as a Corporal in the 23rd Battalion of the Australian Infantry.

== Death ==
Bradford was killed in action while in charge of a section of his battalion's bomb throwers, at Pozières, France, on 4 August 1916.

His name is engraved on the Villers-Bretonneux Memorial, a memorial to all Australian soldiers who fought in France and Belgium during the First World War whose graves are not known.

== See also ==
- List of Victorian Football League players who died on active service
