= Bill Maxwell =

Australian rules footballer (1882–1917)

Personal information
- Full name: William Maxwell
- Born: 12 April 1882; Caulfield, Victoria
- Died: 12 October 1917 (aged 35); Passchendaele salient, Belgium
- Original team: Collegians (MJFA)

Playing career^{1}
Years	Club	Games (Goals)
1909	Melbourne	2 (1)
- ^{1} Playing statistics correct to the end of 1909.

William Maxwell (12 April 1882 – 12 October 1917) was an Australian rules footballer who played with Melbourne in the Victorian Football League (VFL).

== Family ==
The son of Charles Frederick Maxwell (1849–1889), and Eliza Jane Maxwell (1852–1925), née Mooney, William Maxwell was born at Caulfield, Victoria on 12 April 1882.

== Education ==
He was educated at Scotch College, in St Kilda, formerly known as the Hofwyl School, an entirely different institution from the Scotch College, then in East Melbourne, now in Hawthorn.

== Football ==
Recruited from Collegians in 1909, he played his first match for Melbourne against Essendon on 10 July 1909.

His second, and last match for Melbourne, in which he kicked his only VFL goal, was against Geelong on 21 August 1909.

== Military service ==
Maxwell served as a lieutenant with the 38th Battalion during World War I. He left Australia on 20 June 1916 on HMAT Runic (A54).

He was wounded in the Battle of Messines on 7 June 1917 but recovered from his injuries and rejoined his battalion three months later.

== Death ==
Maxwell was killed in action on 12 October 1917 at the First Battle of Passchendaele in Belgium.

He has no known grave and is commemorated at the Menin Gate Memorial to the Missing in Ypres, Belgium.

== See also ==
- List of Victorian Football League players who died on active service
