= Gordon Hamilton (footballer) =

Australian rules footballer

Personal information
- Full name: Gordon Ross Hamilton
- Born: 13 July 1920; East Prahran, Victoria
- Died: 23 February 1941 (aged 20); Chelsea, Victoria
- Original team: Myer's
- Height: 173 cm (5 ft 8 in)
- Weight: 71 kg (157 lb)

Playing career^{1}
Years	Club	Games (Goals)
1940	South Melbourne	2 (0)
- ^{1} Playing statistics correct to the end of 1940.

Gordon Ross Hamilton (13 July 1920 – 23 February 1941) was an Australian rules footballer who played with South Melbourne in the Victorian Football League (VFL). He was the first South Melbourne player to die on active service in World War II.

== Career ==
=== Football ===
Hamilton was born in East Prahran on 13 July 1920, to Gordon and Lily Hamilton. He arrived at South Melbourne from Myer's in 1940 as a centre player. His first opportunity to play league football came in round 15, when Hamilton played for South Melbourne in a six-point loss to Hawthorn at Glenferrie Oval. A week later, Hamilton played his second senior game with South Melbourne, this time in a four-point win over Geelong. Hamilton, described as a "promising young player", was 19th man in both games.

=== Military ===
On 30 December 1940 Hamilton enlisted in the Royal Australian Navy, and he was sent to HMAS Cerberus, near Crib Point on the Mornington Peninsula.

Soon after, on 23 February 1941, Hamilton drowned off a Chelsea beach, in an attempt to save the life of a young girl who had got into difficulties in the choppy seas. His companions were able to bring the girl to shore and revive her, but Hamilton didn't make it back. His body was found 300 yards away on a sandbank.

On Monday 24 February the flag over the South Melbourne Cricket Club pavilion was flown at half mast as a tribute to Hamilton, and Mr. Pat Farnan and Mr. Fred J. Ferry of the South Melbourne Football Club attended his funeral. Hamilton was buried at Fawkner Cemetery on Tuesday, 25 February 1941.

== See also ==
- List of Victorian Football League players who died on active service
