= Noel Ellis =

Australian rules footballer

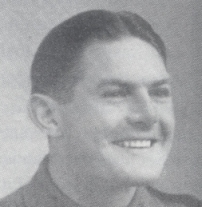

Personal information
- Full name: Arthur Noel Ellis
- Born: 9 July 1921
- Died: 6 July 1942 (aged 20); Queensland
- Original team: Wesley College / Collegians
- Height: 175 cm (5 ft 9 in)
- Weight: 82.5 kg (182 lb)
- Position: Half back flank

Playing career^{1}
Years	Club	Games (Goals)
1940–41	Melbourne	3 (0)
- ^{1} Playing statistics correct to the end of 1941.

Arthur Noel Ellis (9 July 1921 – 6 July 1942) was an Australian rules footballer who played with Melbourne in the Victorian Football League.

== Family ==
The son of Cornelius Stanley Ellis (1894–1948) and Amy Gertrude Ellis (1894–1982), née Christensen, Arthur Noel Ellis was born on 9 July 1921. He had two brothers: Paul and Graeme.

== Education ==
He attended Wesley College on St Kilda Road.

== Football ==
Ellis played for Wesley College's First XVIII and, at the same time, was playing for Collegians Football Club.

In 1940, "Noel Ellis was outstanding at centre half-back with Collegians, in the Victorian Amateur Football Association, [who] transferred to the Demons when the amateurs suspended their competition halfway through the season [due to the war]" (Sporting Globe, 24 August 1940).

Ellis's application for a permit to play with South Melbourne was refused by the VFL Permit Committee, on 26 June 1940 – on the precedent-setting grounds that, as a boarder at Wesley College, Wesley College (rather than his parents' residence at Red Cliffs, Victoria) was deemed to be his official place of residence – and, so, given the physical location of Wesley College (on the eastern side of St Kilda Road), Ellis was residentially bound to Melbourne. The VFL Permit Committee granted him a clearance from Old Collegians to Melbourne.

Ellis participated in his first practice at Melbourne the following evening. He was selected as 19th man in his first First XVIII match for Melbourne, against Hawthorn, on 24 August 1940 (round 17). He also played for the First XVIII in the first two matches of the 1941 VFL season (against Fitzroy, and South Melbourne).

Ellis was injured while playing for Melbourne against Carlton in the first round of the Patriotic Premiership (1941), at the M.C.G., on Saturday, 24 May 1941, and did not play again.

== Cricket ==
He played cricket at Wesley College and South Melbourne Cricket Club.

== Military service ==
He enlisted in the Second AIF in October 1941 – V185010.

== Death ==
Only 20 years of age (three days before he turned 21), Ellis was accidentally shot and killed, by a mishandled revolver, at a World War II military camp in Queensland.

The soldier who fired the weapon, Lieutenant Mervyn David Henry (VX101968), had been talking to Ellis in the mess tent when the incident occurred.

The Melbourne First XVIII wore black armbands in their match against Carlton, on 11 July 1942, as a mark of respect for the memory of Ellis.

== See also ==
- List of Victorian Football League players who died on active service
