= Arthur McKenzie =

Australian rules footballer

Personal information
- Full name: William Arthur McKenzie
- Born: 25 December 1879; Sandhurst
- Died: 18 July 1916 (aged 36); Delville Wood, France
- Original team: Geelong Grammar School

Playing career^{1}
Years	Club	Games (Goals)
1898	Geelong	4 (0)
- ^{1} Playing statistics correct to the end of 1898.

William Arthur McKenzie (25 December 1879 – 18 July 1916) was an Australian rules footballer who played for the Geelong Football Club in the Victorian Football League. He later moved to South Africa, and was killed during World War I.

== Family ==
The son of William Kenneth McKenzie (1850–1920), and Elizabeth Ann McKenzie (1854–1929), née Stoker, William Arthur McKenzie was born at Sandhurst, Victoria (known as Bendigo since 1891) on 25 December 1879.

== Education ==
He attended Geelong Grammar School in 1898. He was considered an outstanding schoolboy athlete in cricket and football.

At the 16 November 1898 Geelong Grammar School sports carnival he was the school's champion athlete, and was awarded the school's Championship Cup for his performance. He won the long jump by 14 1/2 inches (approx. 37cm), jumping 18ft. 11 1/2in. (approx. 5.78m), the 100 yards ("McKenzie … won easily"), the quarter mile ("McLaurin [who finished second] led till 50 yards from home, when McKenzie bolted to the front, winning by several yards"), the mile ("Belcher [who finished second] was leading until about 40 yards from the tap, but McKenzie then spurted to the front, and won by two or three yards"), and came third in the pole vault.

== Football ==
He played for Geelong in the VFL in the last four games of the 1898 football season.

== Military service ==
=== Boer War ===
He served overseas in the 2nd Victorian Mounted Rifles in the Second Boer War (1899–1902).

=== World War I ===
Permanently residing in South Africa, he enlisted in the South African Military Forces, and served overseas in the 1st Regiment South African Infantry.

== Death ==
He was killed in action at Delville Wood, in France, on 18 July 1916. He has no known grave, and is commemorated at the Thiepval Memorial to the Missing of the Somme near Thiepval, in northern France.

== See also ==
- List of Victorian Football League players who died on active service
