= Bill Garvie =

Australian rules footballer

Personal information
- Full name: William Henry Garvie
- Born: 31 December 1910; Cobden, Victoria
- Died: 27 June 1944 (aged 33); Atherton Tablelands, Far North Queensland
- Original team: Hamilton
- Height: 170 cm (5 ft 7 in)
- Weight: 70 kg (154 lb)
- Position: rover/wing

Playing career^{1}
Years	Club	Games (Goals)
1934–1935	Richmond	9 (0)
- ^{1} Playing statistics correct to the end of 1935.

William Henry Garvie (31 December 1910 – 27 June 1944) was an Australian rules footballer who played with Richmond. Winning the Richmond Reserves best and fairest in 1935, he was killed in an accident while serving in the army during World War II.

== Family ==
The son of George William Austin Garvie (1885–1955), and Mary Garvie, William Henry Garvie was born at Cobden, Victoria on 31 December 1910. He married Jean Kathleen Crawford in 1938.

== Football ==
=== Richmond (VFL) ===
Cleared from Hamilton to Richmond, Garvie played a total of nine First XVIII games and 29 Second XVIII games over two seasons (1934 and 1935). He won the Second XVIII best and fairest in 1935.

=== Carlton (VFL) ===
Transferred to Carlton in 1936, he played 13 games and scored 18 goals for the Carlton Second XVIII in that single season. He did not play a single game for the Carlton First XVIII.

=== Oakleigh (VFA) ===
Transferred from Carlton to Oakleigh, Garvie played for Oakleigh First XVIII for the first four matches of the 1937 season.

== Cricket ==
Garvie played two District Cricket matches for the Richmond Cricket Club's First XI in the 1933–34 season.

== Military service ==
Employed as a conductor by the Melbourne & Metropolitan Tramways Board, he enlisted in the Second Australian Imperial Force in November 1942, and served in the 20th Field Bakery Platoon of the Royal Australian Army Service Corps.

== Death ==
Seriously injured (fractured skull, fractured spine, etc.) in an accident on 26 June 1944 (the military vehicle he was in overturned), he died of his injuries the next day. He was buried at the Atherton War Cemetery in Queensland.

== See also ==
- List of Victorian Football League players who died on active service
