= Jack Lynch (footballer, born 1918) =

Australian rules footballer

Personal information
- Full name: John Thomas Lynch
- Born: 9 August 1918; Geelong, Victoria
- Died: 8 September 1944 (aged 26); Charters Towers, Far North Queensland
- Original team: Marnock Vale
- Height: 185 cm (6 ft 1 in)
- Weight: 80 kg (176 lb)

Playing career^{1}
| Years | Club | Games (Goals) |
| 1939–40 | Geelong | 25 (39) |
- ^{1} Playing statistics correct to the end of 1940.

John Thomas Lynch (9 August 1918 – 8 September 1944) was an Australian rules footballer who played with Geelong, until he defected to the VFA club Preston without clearance in 1941. He was killed in a motorcar accident while on active service during World War II.

== Family ==
The second child of James Lynch (1887–1976) and Jessie Lynch (1892–1936), née McWilliam, John Thomas Lynch was born at Geelong on 9 August 1918. One of his younger brothers, Marty Lynch, also played VFL football for Geelong and for South Melbourne.

He married Coral Joan Jamieson in 1939. They had two children, Marion and Merlyn (Coral).

Marion married and had 2 children, Kellie & Peta. Merlyn (Coral) married and had 3 children, Terri (Barra), Tracy & Darren (Roo).

Jack has 7 great-grandchildren and 12 great-great-grandchildren.

== Education ==
Following his mother's death he went to live with his aunt and uncle, and was educated at St Joseph's College, Geelong.

== Football ==
=== Geelong (VFL) ===
Recruited from the Marnock Vale Football Club in the Geelong and District Football Association in 1938, he spent some time with the Seconds—including his game at full-forward in the Second's 1938 Grand Final win against Footscray (12.19 (91) to 12.8 (80)) at the MCG, on Show Day (29 September 1938)—before making his senior debut, against Carlton, at the Corio Oval, on 29 April 1939.

=== Preston (VFA) ===
In 1941, he crossed to Preston in the VFA without a clearance. He played in 21 matches and kicked 132 goals in his single season with Preston.

Although he was clearly Preston's leading goal-kicker in 1941 with a massive total, he was not the Association's leading goal-kicker—Coburg's Bob Pratt had kicked 165 goals in the home-and-away season (total 183 goals, including finals matches); additionally, Camberwell's Laurie Nash had kicked a total of 141 goals.

== Death ==
He died, as the result of an accident, in North Queensland on 8 September 1944: "Lynch and some of his mates were returning [to camp] in the back of a Jeep from a night out in Charters Towers when it ran into a mob of cattle. Lynch was thrown forward onto the Jeep's bonnet, fractured his spine and died shortly after, on September 8, 1944." (Main & Allen, 2002, p. 292).

He was buried in the War Cemetery at Woombye, Queensland.

== See also ==
- List of Victorian Football League players who died on active service
