= Jack Wood (footballer) =

Australian rules footballer

Personal information
- Full name: John Alexander Wood
- Born: 2 January 1889; Essendon, Victoria
- Died: 20 October 1914 (aged 25); Melbourne Hospital, Parkville, Victoria
- Original team: Preston
- Height: 182 cm (6 ft 0 in)

Playing career^{1}
Years	Club	Games (Goals)
1910	Essendon	2 (0)
- ^{1} Playing statistics correct to the end of 1910.

John Alexander Wood (2 January 1889 – 20 October 1914) was an Australian rules footballer who played with Essendon in the Victorian Football League (VFL).

== Family ==
The son of John Thomas Wood (1862–1924), and Kate Wood (1860–1932), née McKenzie, John Alexander Wood was born in Essendon, Victoria on 2 January 1889.

(Note that many of the Junior, VFA, and VFL records — and, as a consequence, many of the newspaper reports — mistakenly give his family name as "Woods": for instance: The Preston Football Team (Association), The Leader, (Saturday, 11 July 1908), p.28).

== Football ==
=== Preston (VFA) ===
Recruited from the Coburg Football Club in the Victorian Junior Football Association in 1908, he played for the VFA team Preston in 1908 and 1909, and played in one match with Preston in 1910.

=== Essendon (VFL) ===
Granted a permit from Preston to Essendon on 15 June 1910, he played two senior games for Essendon in the 1910 VFL season. Both appearances were in winning teams: a win against Richmond in round nine, and a win against Fitzroy in round 10.

== Military service ==
He enlisted in the first AIF on 20 August 1914, and began his military training as a Private with the 6th Infantry Battalion.

== Death ==
He died on 20 October 1914, at the Melbourne Hospital, two days after he had been badly injured when he was hit by a bus "near Broadmeadows camp early on Sunday morning [18 October]" and was immediately "removed to the Melbourne Hospital suffering from internal injuries and a lacerated leg"; "his condition became worse [on 20 October] and he died between 8 and 9 o'clock [that] night" (The Argus, 21 October 1914).

An earlier report states that the accident had "ruptured" a "large artery" of one of his knees and that there was "some danger" of his "losing one of his legs by amputation".

The coroner's investigation returned a finding of "accidental death".

Dr. [Robert Hodgson] Cole, City Coroner, yesterday investigated [the death of] John Alexander Wood … [who] was a passenger on [a bus] returning to camp shortly after midnight on 18th October. … Deceased was seated on the front seat of the vehicle next but one to the driver. When close to the camp he apparently fell or was jolted out of his seat. The driver and other passengers felt a bump, and the bus was stopped. Wood was picked up seriously injured, and was sent in a passing taxi to Melbourne Hospital, where he died on the morning of 20th inst., without being able to explain how the accident happened. Evidence went to show that he was quite sober at the time. No one seemed to have actually seen him fall off the bus, which was travelling at about eight miles an hour. There was no very noticeable jolt which would seem to have thrown him out of his seat.
The Coroner said that probably deceased had tried to get off the bus, and misjudged the distance to the ground. It was evident that the wheels had passed over him.
A verdict of accidental death was recorded. — The Age, 28 October 1914.

== See also ==
- List of Victorian Football League players who died on active service
