= Bobby Royle =

Australian rules footballer and soldier

Personal information
- Full name: Robert Royle
- Born: 24 August 1878; Liverpool, England
- Died: 3 November 1916 (aged 38) near Gueudecourt, France
- Debut: 14 May 1898, Melbourne vs. St Kilda, at Junction Oval

Playing career^{1}
Years	Club	Games (Goals)
1898	Melbourne	3 (0)
- ^{1} Playing statistics correct to the end of 1898.

Robert Royle (24 August 1878 – 3 November 1916) was an Australian rules footballer who played for Melbourne in the Victorian Football League. He died in action whilst serving with the First AIF during the First World War.

== Family ==
Son of Robert (1849–1881) and Barbara Royle (1852–1939), née Phelps, and one of four children, he was born in England on 24 Aug 1878. His mother, along with her four children, moved to Australia in 1880. In 1881, she married Thomas Beck (1849–1910), and had five children with him.

Bobby married Susannah Caroline "Susie" Shillinglaw in 1900. They had five children: Muriel (1900–1975), Barbara Holly (1902–1960), Violet (1905–1981), Myrtle (1908–1909), and Robert Ivan (1910–1964).

== Football ==
He played his first senior match for the Melbourne Football Club, aged 19, against St Kilda, at the Junction Oval on 14 May 1898 (round one). He played in three senior matches: against St Kilda on 14 May 1898, against Carlton on 21 May 1898 ("Royle, a back man with a tremendous turn of speed, also showed well. He did a fine sprint with the ball at top speed, full half the length of the [MCG], on one occasion"), and against Collingwood on 24 May 1898. Melbourne won the three matches by 76, 57, and 10 points respectively.

== After football ==
Prior to his enlistment in the First AIF, he worked as a carpenter/builder.

== Soldier ==
Stating that his occupation was "carpenter", he enlisted on 7 June 1915, and served with the 2nd Company, Australian Machine Gun Corps of the 7th Battalion. He served at Gallipoli, in Egypt, and in France.

== Death ==
He was killed instantly by an enemy shell, when he, as part of a party of seven, took shelter in a trench, near Gueudecourt, on the way to take supplies to their comrades.

== See also ==
- List of Victorian Football League players who died on active service
