= Alex Robertson (Australian rules footballer) =

Australian rules footballer (1887–1915)

Personal information
- Full name: Alexander John Robertson
- Born: 4 January 1887; Bundalaguah near Sale, Victoria
- Died: 6 August 1915 (aged 28); Gallipoli, Ottoman Turkey
- Original team: University Metropolitan

Playing career^{1}
Years	Club	Games (Goals)
1909	University	10 (0)
- ^{1} Playing statistics correct to the end of 1909.

Alexander John Robertson (4 January 1887 – 6 August 1915), a geologist and mining engineer, was an Australian rules footballer who played for the University Football Club in the Victorian Football League (VFL) in 1910.

He served in the First AIF, and was killed in action at Gallipoli, Ottoman Turkey.

== Family ==
The son of James Lang Robertson (1858-1929), and Annie Robertson (1859-1944), née McArthur, Alexander John Robertson was born at Bundalaguah, near Sale, in Gippsland, Victoria, on 4 January 1887, where his father was the headmaster of the local State School.

He married Violet Ann "Dear Wah" Chapman (1885-1917), in Perth, Western Australia on 29 June 1911. Violet left for England not long after Robertson's death, served for almost two years with the Voluntary Aid Detachment at Coulter Hospital, in London, and qualified to serve in France as an ambulance driver. She was killed in a riding accident, in London's Hyde Park, on 30 November 1917.

== Education ==
He was educated at St. Andrew's College, Bendigo, where he was dux of the school, and at the University of Melbourne. He was a resident of Ormond College. While at the university, in addition to his courses in Science and Mining Engineering, he rowed, played cricket, played football, and competed in the long jump for Ormond College; and, as well, represented the university at both rowing, and at football.

=== Awards ===
- 1908: Full blue for football.
- 1909: Bachelor of Science (BSc).
- 1909: Final Honor Scholarship in Geology, Palæontology, and Mineralogy.
- 1909: Professor Kernot Research Scholarship in Geology.
- 1912: Master of Science (MSc).

== Football ==
He was part of the Melbourne University team that played in the annual match against Adelaide University on 19 August 1908.

Playing for the university in the Metropolitan Junior Football Association (MJFA), he made his debut for the university's VFL team, playing on the half-back flank, against Richmond on 8 May 1909. He played 10 senior matches, and was one of the best University players in his last match, the season's final round, in the draw against Fitzroy, that was played in a quagmire at the Brunswick Street Oval on 4 September 1909.

His studies at university and his employment in Queensland prevented him from playing for the university's VFL team in 1910.

== Western Australia ==
Having spent twelve months as a lecturer in science and mining at the Brisbane Technical College, he moved to Western Australia to work as an assistant mineralogist and surveyor with the Geological Survey of West Australia in 1911; and, later, still with the Geological Survey of West Australia, he also assumed the duties of a chemist and analyst.

He was admitted as an inaugural member of the Convocation of the University of Western Australia in 1913.

== Military ==
He enlisted in the First AIF on 10 May 1915, and served overseas in Egypt and at Gallipoli.

== Death ==
He was killed in action at Gallipoli on 6 August 1915.

Lieutenant Alexander John Robertson … had joined the 11th Battalion only two days before his death, and was engaged in holding a trench which had been captured from the Turks.
The latter made a counter attack in force, and Lieutenant Robertson, to inspire confidence in the men under his command, sprang into a recess, and raising his head and shoulders above the parapet, fired his revolver into the foremost of the enemy, and continued to do so until he was shot.
His commanding officer says, "He died a gallant Australian soldier".

== See also ==
- List of Victorian Football League players who died on active service
