= Otto Lowenstern =

Australian rules footballer

Personal information
- Full name: Otto Lowenstern
- Born: 7 December 1888; Dandenong, Victoria
- Died: 1 December 1917 (aged 28) near Gouzeaucourt, France
- Original team: Dandenong

Playing career^{1}
Years	Club	Games (Goals)
1910–11	St Kilda	12 (1)
- ^{1} Playing statistics correct to the end of 1911.

Otto Lowenstern (7 December 1888 – 1 December 1917) was an Australian rules footballer who played with St Kilda in the Victorian Football League (VFL).

Lowenstern spent both the 1910 and 1911 seasons playing in the VFL. He only appeared once in 1910 but played 11 games in 1911 under coach Eddie Drohan.

He fought in World War I, with the Lord Strathcona's Horse (Royal Canadians) regiment of the Royal Canadian Armoured Corps. Lowenstern was killed while fighting in France on 1 December 1917 and is buried at Vimy Memorial at Pas-de-Calais.

== See also ==
- List of Victorian Football League players who died on active service
