= Norm Oliver (footballer, born 1922) =

Australian rules footballer

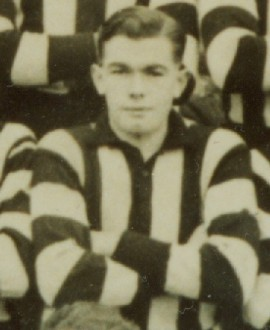
- Oliver in 1940

Personal information
- Full name: Norman Leslie Oliver
- Born: 15 August 1922; Melbourne, Victoria
- Died: 27 June 1944 (aged 21); Hansa Bay, Madang Province, New Guinea
- Original team: Melbourne High School
- Height: 182 cm (6 ft 0 in)
- Weight: 79 kg (174 lb)
- Position: Defence

Playing career^{1}
Years	Club	Games (Goals)
1940–41	Collingwood	13 (2)
- ^{1} Playing statistics correct to the end of 1941.

Norman Leslie Oliver (15 August 1922 – 27 June 1944) was an Australian rules footballer who played with Collingwood in the Victorian Football League (VFL). He was also a talented tennis player, and there was a possibility of him being a future Davis Cup player.

== Family ==
Son of Harold George Oliver (1893-1968), and Gladys Elizabeth Ann Oliver (1894-1961), née Atherton, Norman Leslie Oliver was born on 15 August 1922.

== Military service ==
Serving as a Flying Officer in the RAAF during World War II, he was killed when his Kittyhawk plane crashed on a beach in New Guinea.

== See also ==
- List of Victorian Football League players who died on active service
