= Fred Heintz =

Australian rules footballer (1913–1942)

Personal information
- Full name: Frederick John Heintz
- Nickname: "Fatty"
- Born: 22 July 1913; Carlton, Victoria
- Died: 20 February 1942 (aged 28); Ambon, Dutch East Indies
- Original team: Fitzroy Methodists / Oakleigh
- Position: Half forward flank

Playing career^{1}
| Years | Club | Games (Goals) |
| 1931–33 | Fitzroy | 14 (18) |
| 1934–38 | Oakleigh (VFA) | 57 (116) |
- ^{1} Playing statistics correct to the end of 1938.

Frederick John Heintz (22 July 1913 – 20 February 1942) was an Australian rules footballer who played with Fitzroy in the Victorian Football League (VFL). He was killed at Ambon in World War II.

== Career ==
=== Fitzroy ===
Strictly speaking, he made his VFL debut for Fitzroy, against Collingwood, on 18 July 1931, when he was selected as 19th man; however, in those days, the 19th man in a VFL team only took the field to replace an injured player – and, because there were no Fitzroy injuries, Heintz, although selected, never took the field. He was selected, for a second time, in the Fitzroy team, on the half-forward flank, against Footscray, on 22 August 1931; he did play that day, and that's why some records show it as his debut, and others show it as his second game.

=== Oakleigh ===
In 1934, he was cleared, by Fitzroy, to the VFA club Oakleigh, on the understanding that Oakleigh would release him back to Fitzroy if ever he was required there.

Fitzroy requested his return in 1937, just after the second VFA round of the season; yet, notwithstanding Fitzroy's request, Heintz did not play for Fitzroy again and, although missing seven VFA matches, he resumed playing for Oakleigh in round 9 (12 June) of the 1937 season.

In all, he played 57 games for Oakleigh, over five seasons (1934 to 1938), scoring 116 goals.

== Military service ==
He joined the Second AIF in June 1940. He died in active service.

Heintz … was part of the 2/21 Battalion Gull Force sent to the island of Ambon in the Banda Sea to defend key airfields and deep water harbours. A huge Japanese force invaded the island in January, 1942, with heavy Australian casualties, including 229 Diggers who were executed at the Laha airfield and others taken prisoner of war. Precise details of Heintz's death are not known and he was reported as "presumed" dead, the date of death recorded as February 20, 1942. Private Frederick John Heintz has no known grave and is commemorate at the Ambon Memorial, which takes the form of a shelter …

== See also ==
- List of Victorian Football League players who died on active service
