= Bill Landy =

Australian rules footballer

Personal information
- Full name: William Joseph Landy
- Nickname: Plugger
- Born: 25 June 1897; Geelong, Victoria
- Died: 19 July 1916 (aged 19); Fromelles, France
- Height: 164 cm (5 ft 5 in)
- Weight: 59 kg (130 lb)

Playing career^{1}
Years	Club	Games (Goals)
1915	Geelong	2 (1)
- ^{1} Playing statistics correct to the end of 1915.

William Joseph Landy was an Australian rules footballer who played with Geelong in the Victorian Football League. Joining the army at the age of 18, he was killed in action at Fromelles during World War I.

== See also ==
- List of Victorian Football League players who died on active service

== Sources ==
- Holmesby, Russell & Main, Jim (2007). The Encyclopedia of AFL Footballers. 7th ed. Melbourne: Bas Publishing.
- Bill Landy's playing statistics from AFL Tables
