= Jack Freeman (Australian rules footballer) =

Australian rules footballer

Personal information
- Full name: Jack Freeman
- Born: 15 November 1891; Bairnsdale, Victoria
- Died: 15 November 1916 (aged 25); Rouen, France
- Original team: Rose of Northcote
- Height: 170 cm (5 ft 7 in)
- Weight: 66 kg (146 lb)

Playing career^{1}
Years	Club	Games (Goals)
1913–14	South Melbourne	22 (39)
- ^{1} Playing statistics correct to the end of 1914.

Jack Freeman (15 November 1891 – 15 November 1916) was an Australian rules footballer who played with South Melbourne in the Victorian Football League.

== Family ==
The son of Frederick and Margaret Freeman, née McGuiness, he was born on 15 November 1891. He died of wounds received on active service on 15 November 1916.

== Football ==
Top goalscorer for South Melbourne in 1914.

== Military ==
He enlisted in the First AIF in July 1915. He was badly wounded in France; and, after having both legs amputated, he died in a military hospital on his 25th birthday.

== See also ==
- List of Victorian Football League players who died on active service
