= Jack Keddie =

Australian rules footballer

Personal information
- Full name: Jack Keddie
- Born: 12 February 1922; Maffra, Victoria
- Died: 15 August 1945 (aged 23); Wewak, Territory of New Guinea
- Original team: Keilor

Playing career^{1}
Years	Club	Games (Goals)
1941	Essendon	1 (0)
- ^{1} Playing statistics correct to the end of 1941.

Jack Keddie (12 February 1922 – 15 August 1945) was an Australian rules footballer who played with Essendon. Considered to be a great talent, his league career was cut short due to war.

He was accidentally drowned on Victory in the Pacific Day while serving with the Second AIF.

== Family ==
The son of schoolteacher Robert Keddie, and Christina Keddie, née Edmond, Jack Keddie was born in Maffra on 12 February 1922.

He was engaged to Olive Myrtle Wright, of Palmwoods, Queensland, in September 1944. He died before they could be married.

== Football ==
"A natural athlete with a loping gait and ability to win the ball almost at will", Keddie was recruited from Keilor, and a regular Second XVIII player, he played one senior match for Essendon, when he was selected to replace the injured Harold Lambert in the match against Fitzroy on 30 August 1941. He injured his shoulder, and was replaced in the last quarter.

Playing for the Essendon Second XVIII he scored four goals in its 1941 Grand Final victory over the Fitzroy Second XVIII.

== Death ==
Keddie, who could not swim, was accidentally drowned at Wewak, Territory of New Guinea on 15 August 1945 while serving with the Second AIF, when the rowing boat he was sharing with his brother Lyle Keddie (VX91352), and his two mates, Clarrie Vernon (VX113376) and Patrick George Dungan (VX131595) overturned. All four were serving in the same A.E.M.E. unit.

== See also ==
- List of Victorian Football League players who died on active service

== Sources ==
- Holmesby, Russell & Main, Jim (2007). The Encyclopedia of AFL Footballers. 7th ed. Melbourne: Bas Publishing.
- Main, J. & Allen, D., "Keddie, Jack", pp. 273–275 in Main, J. & Allen, D., Fallen – The Ultimate Heroes: Footballers Who Never Returned From War, Crown Content, (Melbourne), 2002. ISBN 1-74095-010-0
- World War Two Service Record: Sergeant Jack Keddie (VX105370), National Archives of Australia.
- Roll of Honour: Sergeant Jack Keddie (VX105370), Australian War Memorial.
