= Tasman Roberts =

Australian rules footballer

Personal information
- Full name: Albert Tasman Roberts
- Born: 18 August 1901; Albert Park, Victoria
- Died: 9 April 1942 (aged 40); Rabaul, Territory of New Guinea
- Original team: Prahran
- Position: Ruck / forward pocket

Playing career^{1}
Years	Club	Games (Goals)
1925–27	St Kilda	41 (22)
1928	Fitzroy	17 (10)
Total		58 (32)
- ^{1} Playing statistics correct to the end of 1928.

Albert Tasman Roberts (18 August 1901 – 9 April 1942) was an Australian rules footballer who played with St Kilda and Fitzroy in the Victorian Football League (VFL).

Originally recruited from Prahran in the Victorian Football Association, he returned to the VFA to play for Yarraville Football Club in 1929. In July 1930 Roberts and a Yarraville team-mate, Peter Hannan, were involved in a car accident, in which Roberts fractured his skull.

In 1940, using his given name, his mother's maiden name and a false date of birth, Roberts enlisted in the 2/22nd Infantry Battalion as Albert Lyons. In April 1941 his battalion embarked to Rabaul, Territory of New Guinea. He was captured as a prisoner of war during the Battle of Rabaul in January 1942. In October 1945 he was recorded as having died on 9 April 1942 from inanition cachexia (starvation).

== See also ==
- List of Victorian Football League players who died on active service
