= Wallace Mills =

Australian rules footballer

Personal information
- Full name: Wallace Hickford Mills
- Born: 7 January 1915; Middle Park, Victoria
- Died: 24 November 1943 (aged 28); Gordonvale, Queensland
- Height: 187 cm (6 ft 2 in)
- Weight: 84 kg (185 lb)

Playing career^{1}
Years	Club	Games (Goals)
1937	St Kilda	1 (0)
- ^{1} Playing statistics correct to the end of 1937.

Wallace Hickford Mills (7 January 1915 – 24 November 1943) was an Australian rules footballer who played with St Kilda in the Victorian Football League (VFL).

== Family ==
The son of Frederick Mills (1880–1966), and Emily Louisa "Emma" Mills (1866–1949), née Hickford, Wallace Hickford Mills was born in Middle Park, Victoria on 7 January 1915.

He married Edith Jane Edward (1915–2003) in 1939.

== Football ==
He played in one First XVIII match for St Kilda: against Footscray, at the Junction Oval, on 24 July 1937. He was promoted from the Seconds, and replaced Ken Mackie. He was relegated to the Seconds for the next week's match.

== Military service ==
He enlisted for service in the Australian Military forces on 4 December 1939, and served overseas in the Middle East.

== Death ==
He was killed in a motor accident in Far North Queensland while serving with the 2/41st Light Aid Detachment, Australian Corps of Electrical and Mechanical Engineers.

On 24 November 1943, Mills was fatally injured when the army truck he was riding in collided with a Royal Australian Air Force truck on the Innisfail-Cairns road. He died later that day at a hospital in Gordonvale.

He was buried at the Atherton War Cemetery.

== See also ==
- List of Victorian Football League players who died on active service
