= Jack Drake (footballer) =

Australian rules footballer

Personal information
- Full name: John Montague Drake
- Born: 15 March 1904; Perth, Western Australia
- Died: 23 April 1941 (aged 37); Bralos Pass, Thermopylae, Greece
- Original team: Old Xaverians
- Position: Centre half back

Playing career^{1}
Years	Club	Games (Goals)
1926	Hawthorn	3 (1)
- ^{1} Playing statistics correct to the end of 1926.

John Montague Drake (15 March 1904 – 23 April 1941) was an Australian rules footballer who played for Hawthorn in the Victorian Football League.

== Early life ==
The son of Frederick David Drake (1857–1941) and Mary Elizabeth Drake, née Falvey (1868–1956), John Montague Drake was born in Perth on 15 March 1904. The Drake family moved to Melbourne before he reached school age and Jack Drake was educated at Xavier College.

== Football ==
Drake joined Hawthorn during the 1926 VFL season and scored a goal on debut against Fitzroy, but was also injured and missed the next six weeks. He played two more games at the end of the season but failed to make the senior squad for the 1927 season.

== World War II ==
Jack Drake enlisted to serve in the Australian Army during World War II in December 1939. After completing training at Seymour he was deployed to Palestine and then Greece, his division providing support for Allied troops as the German forces swept through Greece in April 1941.

Drake was killed on 23 April 1941, aged 37, while defending a bridge at the Bralos Pass, Thermopylae, Greece against German artillery. A Lance Bombardier serving on a field gun position, both of his legs were amputated below the knee by a shell blast, fatally wounding Drake. The same blast killed and wounded several other gunners.

== See also ==
- List of Victorian Football League players who died on active service
