= Bill Hudson (footballer) =

Australian rules footballer

Personal information
- Full name: Ross William Hudson
- Born: 11 November 1920; Adelaide, South Australia
- Died: 11 April 1945 (aged 24); New Guinea
- Original team: West Adelaide
- Height: 6 ft 1 in (185 cm)
- Weight: 13 st 8 lb (86 kg)
- Position: Forward

Playing career^{1}
| Years | Club | Games (Goals) |
| 1937-1942 | West Adelaide (SANFL) | 68 (134) |
| 1942 | St Kilda (VFL) | 5 (6) |
- ^{1} Playing statistics correct to the end of 1942.

Ross William Hudson (11 November 1920 – 11 April 1945) was an Australian rules footballer who played with St Kilda. Joining St Kilda during army service in World War II, he died from injuries sustained in an accidental grenade explosion whilst serving with the Second Australian Imperial Force in New Guinea.

== Family ==
The son of Albert Arthur Hudson, and Ann Hudson, Ross William Hudson was born in Adelaide on 11 November 1920. He married Eileen Maria Coombes on 4 March 1944.

== Education ==
He was educated at Goodwood Central School.

== Football ==
=== West Adelaide (SANFL) ===
He played in 68 games and scored 134 goals for the West Adelaide Football Club from 1937 to 1942, with one of those games played for the "West-Glenelg" (the combined West Adelaide and Glenelg Football Club) team, on 13 June 1942, in the so-called "Patriotic League" in South Australia, before the Army transferred him to Victoria.

=== St Kilda (VFL) ===
Having been transferred to Victoria with the AIF, he played five games for St Kilda in 1942, the first of which was the round 11 match against North Melbourne on 18 July 1942. Selected as nineteenth man, Hudson came on in the second quarter and kicked three goals.

== Cricket ==
He played for cricket for the Adelaide Cricket Club. From the 1936/1937 season to the 1940/1941 season, he "scored 342 runs from 26 innings (three not out) for an average of 14.86 and a top score of 65".

== Military service ==
Employed as a printer at Vardon and Sons Printing Works, he enlisted in the Second AIF in October 1941.

== Death ==
Hudson served as a lance-corporal in the Pacific theatre of the Second World War, and died of injuries sustained — "accidentally killed in a grenade explosion" — while fighting the Japanese, in New Guinea on 11 April 1945. He was buried at the Bomana War Cemetery on 15 April 1945.

== See also ==
- List of Victorian Football League players who died on active service

== Sources ==
- Holmesby, Russell & Main, Jim (2007). The Encyclopedia of AFL Footballers. 7th ed. Melbourne: Bas Publishing.
- Main, J. & Allen, D., "Hudson, Bill", pp.267-269 in Main, J. & Allen, D., Fallen – The Ultimate Heroes: Footballers Who Never Returned From War, Crown Content, (Melbourne), 2002.
- Roll of Honour: Lance Corporal Ross William Hudson (SX20394), Australian War Memorial.
- Roll of Honour Circular: Lance Corporal Ross William Hudson (SX20394), Australian War Memorial Collection.
