= Jack Walker (Australian footballer, born 1892) =

Australian rules footballer

Personal information
- Full name: John Preston Walker
- Born: 16 May 1892; North Brighton, Victoria
- Died: 27 July 1916 (aged 24); Pozières, France
- Original teams: Dandenong and Melbourne Grammar
- Height: 184 cm (6 ft 0 in)
- Weight: 68 kg (150 lb)

Playing career^{1}
Years	Club	Games (Goals)
1910–11	St Kilda	4 (2)
- ^{1} Playing statistics correct to the end of 1911.

John Preston Walker (16 May 1892 – 27 July 1916) was an Australian rules footballer who played with St Kilda in the Victorian Football League. He was killed while on active service in France during World War I.

== Family ==
The son of William Henry Walker (1860–1949), and Florance Maud Walker, née Williams, John Preston Walker was born at North Brighton, Victoria on 16 May 1892.

== Education ==
He was educated at the Melbourne Grammar School. He played in the school's First XVIII in 1908 and 1909. He was captain of the school's First XI in 1908.

At the combined public schools sport meeting held at the Melbourne Cricket Ground on 3 May 1906, Walker tied for first place in the Under-14 High jump, with a leap of 4 ft 5in (135 cm), which broke the existing record.

== Cricket ==
A batsman/wicketkeeper, he played one District Cricket match for the St Kilda Cricket Club's First XI in the 1909–1910 season (1 innings 0 runs; 2 stumpings), and eight matches for the East Melbourne Cricket Club's First XI in the 1911–1912, 1912–1913, and 1913–1914 seasons (6 catches, 3 stumpings; 9 innings, 178 runs, highest score 61 runs).

== Football ==
=== St Kilda (VFL) ===
He played in four First XVIII matches with St Kilda. His first match was in the final round of the 1910 season, against Carlton on 3 September 1910 in which St Klda 5.6 (36) defeated Carlton 2.12 (24) – it was St Kilda's only win for the season.

He also played three games in the 1911 season.

=== Dandenong Football Club (DBDA) ===
After leaving St Kilda, he played with the Dandenong Football Club in the Dandenong and Berwick District Association in 1913 and 1914.

== Military service ==
He enlisted in the First AIF on 4 January 1915, and left Australia on 14 April 1915 on the HMAT Wiltshire. He served with the 8th Australian Infantry Battalion in Gallipoli and France, and was promoted to Sergeant on 2 May 1916.

== Death ==
He was killed (instantly) in action during the Battle of Pozières on 27 July 1916. Buried that evening in a shell-hole, he has no known grave.

He is commemorated at the Villers–Bretonneux Australian National Memorial, and at the Melbourne Grammar School Honour Roll.

On Monday, 28 August 1916, the Dandenong Town Hall flag was flown at half mast; and, on Saturday, 2 September 1916, in their match against the Navy Office, the Dendenong Patriotics players wore armbands out of respect for the late Sergeant Jack Walker, recently killed in France.

== See also ==
- List of Victorian Football League players who died on active service
