= Alf Goonan =

Australian rules footballer

Personal information
- Full name: Alfred Goonan
- Born: 3 April 1904; North Melbourne, Victoria
- Died: 22 January 1942 (aged 37) near Johor, British Malaya
- Original team: North Melbourne Under-19s
- Height: 178 cm (5 ft 10 in)
- Weight: 74 kg (163 lb)
- Position: Forward pocket

Playing career^{1}
Years	Club	Games (Goals)
1925–1926	North Melbourne	7 (12)
- ^{1} Playing statistics correct to the end of 1926.

Alfred Goonan (3 April 1904 – 22 January 1942) was an Australian rules footballer who played with North Melbourne in the Victorian Football League (VFL).

== Family ==
The son of William Goonan (1868–1957), and Emma Goonan (1866–1925), née Williams, Alfred Goonan was born in North Melbourne on 3 April 1904.

== Football ==
=== North Melbourne (VFA) ===
Goonan joined the North Melbourne under 19s and, later, played the last two games of the 1924 season for the North Melbourne VFA team.

=== North Melbourne (VFL) ===
He played in North's first ever VFL game, against Geelong at Corio Oval. Playing at forward pocket, he scored North's first score in a game of VFL: a behind. He kicked 1.1 for the match.

Playing against Fitzroy at Arden Street, in North Melbourne's second VFL match, Goonan kicked 4 goals.

== Military service ==
He joined the Australian Imperial Force in 1940 at Mildura, and was deployed to British Malaya in August 1941. After the invasion of the colony by the Japanese Empire, Goonan's battalion fought fiercely, resulting in Goonan being wounded. The battalion fought the Japanese until forced to retreat at the Simpang-kiri River. The battalion left its wounded behind, including Goonan, in the hope that the Japanese would give them medical care. All 110 left behind were executed near Johor in the Parit Sulong Massacre, including Goonan.

== See also ==
- List of Victorian Football League players who died on active service
