= Fred Fielding (footballer) =

Australian rules footballer

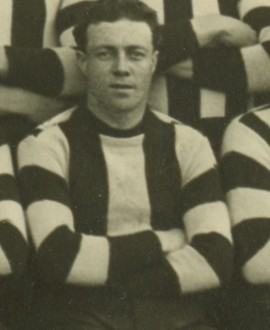
- Fielding in 1913

Personal information
- Full name: Alfred Fielding
- Born: 6 September 1889; Bendigo, Victoria
- Died: 8 August 1918 (aged 28); Villers-Bretonneux, France
- Original team: South Bendigo (BFL)

Playing career^{1}
Years	Club	Games (Goals)
1911	South Melbourne	1 (0)
1913	Collingwood	17 (10)
Total		18 (10)
- ^{1} Playing statistics correct to the end of 1913.

Fred Fielding (6 September 1889 – 8 August 1918) was an Australian rules footballer who played with South Melbourne and Collingwood in the Victorian Football League.

Recruited from South Bendigo where he played in their 1909, 1910, 1911, and 1912 Bendigo Football Association premiership teams.

== Family ==
The son of James Fielding (-1901), and Winifred Fielding (-1936), née Gleeson, he was born on 6 September 1889.

== Military ==
He enlisted to serve in World War I using the name James Gleeson (his father's given name and his mother's maiden name) while in Perth in 1916.

== Death ==
He died in action on the first day of the Hundred Days Offensive, the final series of offensives by the Allies on the Western Front in World War I.

== See also ==
- List of Victorian Football League players who died on active service
