= Jim Mackie =

Australian rules footballer

Personal information
- Full name: James Robert Mackie
- Born: 31 December 1889; Port Melbourne, Victoria
- Died: 20 March 1917 (aged 27); Bapaume, France
- Original team: Port Melbourne Railway United

Playing career^{1}
Years	Club	Games (Goals)
1913	Melbourne	5 (0)
- ^{1} Playing statistics correct to the end of 1913.

James Robert Mackie (31 December 1889 – 20 March 1917) was an Australian rules footballer who played with Melbourne in the Victorian Football League (VFL). He was killed in action in World War I.

== See also ==
- List of Victorian Football League players who died on active service

== Sources ==
- Holmesby, Russell & Main, Jim (2007). The Encyclopedia of AFL Footballers. 7th ed. Melbourne: Bas Publishing.
- Jim Mackie's playing statistics from AFL Tables
