= Harry Daniel =

Australian rules footballer

Personal information
- Full name: Harold Daniel
- Born: 19 June 1879; Western Creek, Ballarat, Australia
- Died: 10 August 1918 (aged 39); Amiens, France
- Position: Defender

Playing career^{1}
Years	Club	Games (Goals)
1901	Carlton	11 (0)
- ^{1} Playing statistics correct to the end of 1901.

Harold "Harry" Daniel, MM (19 June 1879 – 10 August 1918) was an Australian rules footballer who played with Carlton in the Victorian Football League (VFL).

Originally from the Ballarat region, Daniel played in the Victorian Football Association at Port Melbourne before joining Carlton for the 1901 VFL season. He put together 11 games in the first 12 rounds, as a defender, before returning to Port Melbourne.

Daniel would later fight in the First World War as a private with the 5th Battalion. He was awarded a Military Medal in 1917 for bravery during an offensive against the German lines at Ypres. A month later, he was seriously injured after taking fire from a machine-gun and was evacuated to England for treatment. He returned to the front in March 1918 but was killed in action by shellfire three months later in the Battle of Amiens.

== See also ==
- List of Victorian Football League players who died on active service
