= Mo Shapir =

Australian rules footballer

Personal information
- Full name: Morris William "Mo" Shapir
- Born: 9 September 1917; South Melbourne
- Died: 15 August 1942 (aged 24); British-occupied Egypt
- Original team: Melbourne High School Old Boys (VAFA)
- Height: 164 cm (5 ft 5 in)
- Weight: 61.5 kg (136 lb)

Playing career^{1}
Years	Club	Games (Goals)
1935	North Melbourne	3 (2)
- ^{1} Playing statistics correct to the end of 1935.

Morris William "Mo" Shapir (9 September 1917 – 15 August 1942) was an Australian rules footballer who played with North Melbourne. He was killed in action serving with the R.A.A.F. in World War II.

== Family ==
The son of Eleazar Shapir (1898–1988) and Rosetta Blanche Shapir (1898–1975), née Gooding, Morris William Shapir was born in South Melbourne on 9 September 1917.

He was engaged to Norma Turnbull (his death prevented their marriage).

== Football ==
Recruited from Melbourne High School Old Boys (MHSOB) in the Victorian Amateur Football Association (VAFA).

He sustained a leg injury in the 1936 pre-season training.

== Military service ==
Shapir served in the Royal Australian Air Force as a Flight Sergeant.

On 22 October 1941, Shapir's flak-damaged Vickers Wellington (IV R1765), piloted by RAF Flight Lieutenant James Anthony Hosking "Jimmie" Sargeaunt, crashed while returning from a bombing raid. The crew bailed out over Aldershot in England. One of the crew (the rear gunner who had not bailed out) died, and another two were wounded (including Shapir who suffered internal injuries and a broken leg).

== Death ==
On 15 August 1942, the bomber Shapir was on (Wellington IC DV676), piloted by RAF Flight Sergeant Alfred Ronald Beaven (1269424), was lost over British-occupied Egypt. Shapir's remains were not found, and he is commemorated on the Alamein Memorial.

== See also ==
- List of Victorian Football League players who died on active service
