= Sam Campbell (footballer) =

Australian rules footballer

Personal information
- Full name: Samuel Cleland Campbell
- Born: 12 March 1891; Ballarat, Victoria
- Died: 21 October 1918 (aged 27); Freetown, British Sierra Leone
- Original teams: Spensley Street Methodists Clifton Hill

Playing career^{1}
Years	Club	Games (Goals)
1910	Collingwood	1 (0)
- ^{1} Playing statistics correct to the end of 1910.

Samuel Cleland Campbell (12 March 1891 – 21 October 1918) was an Australian rules footballer who played with Collingwood in the Victorian Football League (VFL).

He died of illness (influenza), in British Sierra Leone, while on active service in World War I.

== Family ==
One of the eight children of John Campbell (1836–1913) and Johanna McIntosh Campbell (1848–1915), née Matheson, he was born in Ballarat, Victoria on 12 March 1891.

His cousin, Sapper George McLarty (5386), who also served in the First AIF, died of pneumonia at Chester Military Hospital, in England, on 4 November 1918.

== Footballer ==
Aged 19, recruited from Spensley Street Methodists, he played his only senior VFL match for Collingwood, against Carlton, at Princes Park, on 30 April 1910 (round one). Carlton won by 28 points, 9.9 (63) to 5.5 (35).

== Soldier ==
Enlisting with the First AIF on 14 May 1918, giving his occupation as clerk, and his status as single, he was engaged as part of the 12th General (Victorian) Reinforcements. He died, on active service, in transit to the United Kingdom.

== Death ==
Private Samuel Cleland Campbell died of influenza on 21 October 1918 in a military hospital, having been put ashore from HMAT Barambah (A37) in Freetown, British Sierra Leone, en route to the United Kingdom.

Eleven of the men that had left Cape Town, South Africa with Campbell on the (overcrowded and insanitary) HMAT Barambah on 6 October 1918 had already died – ten of whom were buried at sea – from the influenza epidemic that had broken out on board after embarkation, by the time the transport ship reached Freetown on 20 October 1918.

He was admitted to the ship's hospital on 14 October 1918, seriously ill with influenza.

He was put ashore on 20 October 1918, and admitted to the military hospital at Tower Hill in a critical condition, suffering from influenza and pneumonia. He died the next day (i.e., seven days after his presentation for treatment).

He is buried at the Freetown (King Tom) Military Cemetery, in Sierra Leone. His name is located at panel 185 in the Commemorative Area at the Australian War Memorial.

== See also ==
- List of Victorian Football League players who died on active service
