= Les Primrose =

Australian rules footballer

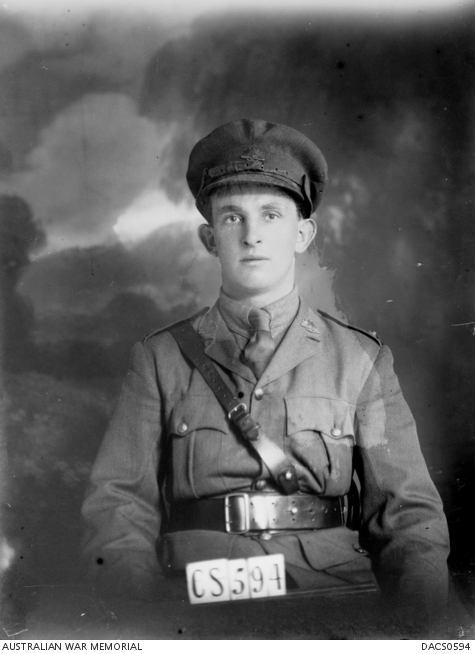
- Primrose in November 1916

Personal information
- Full name: Leslie John Primrose
- Born: 14 May 1890; Ballarat, Victoria
- Died: 4 June 1918 (aged 28); Somme, France
- Original team: Ballarat

Playing career^{1}
Years	Club	Games (Goals)
1912–13	University	16 (0)
- ^{1} Playing statistics correct to the end of 1913.

Leslie John Primrose (14 May 1890 – 4 June 1918) was an Australian rules footballer who played with University in the Victorian Football League. He served in the Australian Flying Corps in World War I and took part in dogfights against the German Red Baron unit. He was killed in a plane crash in 1918.

== Family ==
The son of John William Primrose (1866–1919), and Catherine Ellen Primrose (1867–1937), née Dent, Leslie John Primrose was born in Ballarat, Victoria on 14 May 1890.

== Football ==
=== University (VFL) ===
Cleared from Golden Point to University on 26 April 1912, he played in 16 senior matches over two seasons (1912–1913).

== Military service ==
Employed as a schoolteacher, Primrose enlisted in the First AIF on 2 August 1915.

== Death ==
He was killed in action when his plane crashed on its return flight to its base on 4 June 1918.

== See also ==
- List of Victorian Football League players who died on active service
