= Charles Langtree =

Australian rules footballer

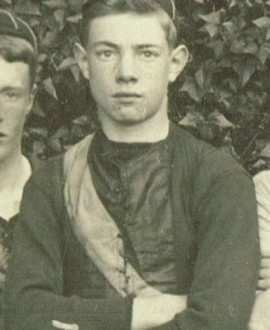
- Langtree in 1900

Personal information
- Full name: Charles Henry Langtree
- Born: 23 April 1883; Moonee Ponds, Victoria
- Died: 3 August 1916 (aged 33); Corbie, France
- Original team: Haileybury College

Playing career^{1}
Years	Club	Games (Goals)
1900	Collingwood	1 (0)
- ^{1} Playing statistics correct to the end of 1900.

Charles Henry Langtree (23 April 1883 – 3 August 1916) was an Australian rules footballer who played with Collingwood in the Victorian Football League (VFL).

He was wounded in World War I while serving with the British Army, and later died of his injuries.

== Family ==
The son of Charles William Langtree (1848–1899), and Jeannie Langtree (-1915), née McCracken, Charles Henry Langtree was born at Moonee Ponds, Victoria on 23 April 1883. He was the grandson of Alexander McCracken (1856–1915), the first president of the VFL.

He grew up on the family property, "Ulundi", at Warrenbayne in north-eastern Victoria.

== Education ==
He was educated at Haileybury College, where he excelled at both cricket and football and at Dookie College.

== Football ==
Langtree "attended Dookie College before being recruited to Collingwood as 'an old boy' from Haileybury College".

Having played for a Collingwood team a week earlier (21 July 1900) in a match against a Bright District team, he played his only senior VFL game, at the age of 17, against St Kilda at the Junction Oval on 28 July 1900.

He enlisted in the British Army in World War I, and served in the 159th Brigade Royal Field Artillery with the rank of Lieutenant.

== Death ==
He died of wounds sustained in action (in the Battle of the Somme) on 3 August 1916.

He is buried at Corbie Communal Cemetery Extension, in Corbie, France.

His name is recorded on the Warrenbayne War Memorial.

== See also ==
- List of Victorian Football League players who died on active service
