= Jeff Grieve =

Australian rules footballer

Personal information
- Full name: Jeffrey James Grieve
- Born: 27 January 1918; Armadale, Victoria
- Died: 8 November 1944 (aged 26); Glenshee, Scotland
- Original team: McKinnon
- Height: 173 cm (5 ft 8 in)
- Weight: 70 kg (154 lb)

Playing career^{1}
Years	Club	Games (Goals)
1941	South Melbourne	11 (0)
- ^{1} Playing statistics correct to the end of 1941.

Flight Sergeant Jeffrey James Grieve (27 January 1918 – 8 November 1944) was an Australian rules footballer who played with South Melbourne in the Victorian Football League (VFL).

Originally from McKinnon, Grieve made 11 appearances for South Melbourne, which all came in the 1941 VFL season.

He was a second cousin of Carlton player Ollie Grieve.

== Military ==
Grieve, who worked as a baker, enlisted in the Royal Australian Air Force in 1942. On 8 November 1944, Grieve was one of seven men on board a bomber (Halifax LK901), which crashed during a cross-country training exercise. The plane took off from Sandtoft, Lincolnshire and broke up mid air after going into cumulonimbus clouds due to atmospheric icing. The plane's remains crashed into the ground near Glenshee, Scotland, killing all 7 crew members on board.

== See also ==
- List of Victorian Football League players who died on active service
