= Marty Lynch (Australian footballer) =

Australian rules footballer

Personal information
- Full name: Martin Joseph Lynch
- Born: 8 August 1926; Geelong, Victoria
- Died: 17 December 2016 (aged 90); North Geelong, Victoria
- Original team: Geelong West
- Height: 175 cm (5 ft 9 in)
- Weight: 76 kg (168 lb)

Playing career^{1}
Years	Club	Games (Goals)
1947–51	Geelong	43 (63)
1952	South Melbourne	8 (11)
Total		51 (74)
- ^{1} Playing statistics correct to the end of 1952.

Martin Joseph Lynch (8 August 1926 – 17 December 2016) was an Australian rules footballer who played with Geelong and South Melbourne in the Victorian Football League (VFL). He was the brother of Jack Lynch (footballer, born 1918).
