= Wilf Atkinson =

Australian rules footballer

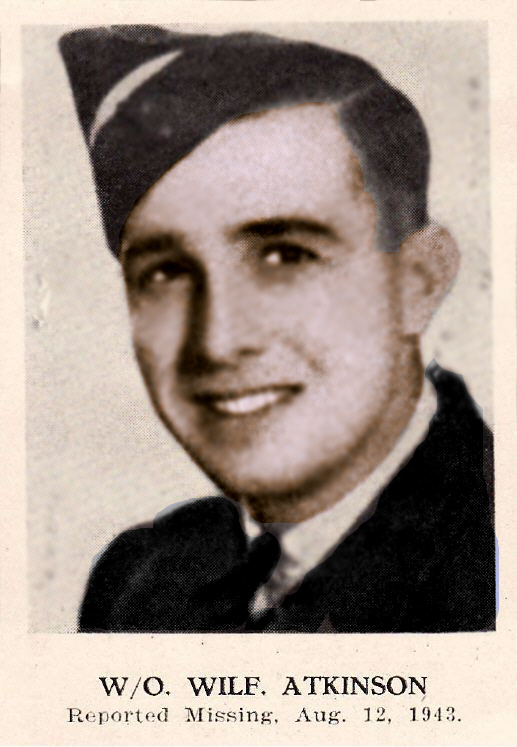
- Atkinson in 1943

Personal information
- Full name: Wilfred George Atkinson
- Born: 9 April 1920; Armadale, Victoria
- Died: 12 August 1943 (aged 23); Aegean Sea
- Original team: Hampton

Playing career^{1}
Years	Club	Games (Goals)
1942	Carlton	1 (0)
- ^{1} Playing statistics correct to the end of 1942.

Wilfred George Atkinson (9 April 1920 – 12 August 1943) was an Australian rules footballer who played with Carlton in the Victorian Football League (VFL). He enlisted in the Royal Australian Air Force during World War II, and was killed in action when his bomber was shot down over the Aegean Sea in 1943. He was serving as a Pilot Officer in No. 232 Squadron RAF.

== Family ==
The third son of Hector Rupert Atkinson (1879–1958), and Marion Atkinson (1882–1946), née Jackson, Wilfred George Atkinson was born in Armadale, Victoria on 9 April 1920. His brother, Leonard James Melbourne Atkinson (1918–), who also served in the Second AIF, was a prisoner of war of the Japanese.

== Football ==
Recruited from Sandringham, and having already enlisted in the RAAF, and having commenced his training at Point Cook, he made his debut for Carlton, and played well in the centre, in the match against South Melbourne, Carlton's first match for the season, on 16 May 1942. It was the only match that Atkinson played for Carlton; the following week he informed Carlton that he was unable to continue playing due to his transfer from Point Cook to another station.

== Military service ==
He served in the RAAF in World War II, having enlisted in May 1941. He was killed in action while flying on a Short Stirling when it was shot down over the Aegean Sea. On the flight, he was serving as a wireless operator.

== See also ==
- List of Victorian Football League players who died on active service
