= Bill Nolan (footballer, born 1888) =

Australian rules footballer (1888–1916)

Personal information
- Full name: William Nolan
- Born: 4 September 1888; Corop, Victoria
- Died: 23 July 1916 (aged 27); Fleurbaix, France
- Original team: Brighton Juniors
- Height: 180 cm (5 ft 11 in)
- Weight: 89 kg (196 lb)

Playing career^{1}
Years	Club	Games (Goals)
1914–15	Richmond	30 (4)
- ^{1} Playing statistics correct to the end of 1915.

William Nolan (4 September 1888 – 23 July 1916) was an Australian rules footballer who played with Richmond in the Victorian Football League. He died of wound sustained in France while serving with the First AIF in World War I.

== Family ==
The son of John Patrick Nolan (1839–1920), and Elizabeth Mary Nolan (1855–1929), née Cullen, William Nolan was born in the northern Victorian town of Corop on 4 September 1888.

== Football ==
His 30-game career with Richmond, as a ruckman, ended with his enlistment in the First AIF.

== Death ==
He died of wound sustained in action at Fleurbaix, France on 23 July 1916.

== See also ==
- List of Victorian Football League players who died on active service
