= Alex Nash =

Australian rules footballer

Personal information
- Full name: James Alexander Nash
- Born: 10 January 1923; Carlton, Victoria
- Died: 28 March 1944 (aged 21); Solomon Sea, off Bougainville Island, New Guinea
- Original team: Hawthorn Colts
- Position: Half back

Playing career^{1}
Years	Club	Games (Goals)
1942	Hawthorn	1 (0)
- ^{1} Playing statistics correct to the end of 1942.

James Alexander Nash DFM (10 January 1923 – 28 March 1944) was an Australian rules footballer who played for the Hawthorn Football Club in the Victorian Football League (VFL).

== Family ==
The son of Stanley Nash, and Myra Lucille Nash, née McIntosh, James Alexander Nash was born at Carlton, Victoria on 10 January 1923.

== Football ==
His only VFL game, which was against Collingwood, was while he was on leave from Royal Australian Air Force (RAAF) duties.

== Military service ==
A notable pilot, he was awarded the Distinguished Flying Medal for his efforts during the Second World War; the award was presented to his mother by William McKell, the Governor-General of Australia, at Government House, Melbourne, on 20 October 1947.

== Death ==
He was killed in action off Bougainville, on 28 March 1944, when the bomber he was flying crashed into the sea in poor conditions and failing light while making a steep turn on his return to base after a strafing raid.

His body was never recovered. He is commemorated at the Rabaul War Cemetery.

== See also ==
- List of Victorian Football League players who died on active service
