= Albert Gourlay =

Australian rules footballer

Personal information
- Full name: Albert John Gourlay
- Born: 31 July 1881; Emerald Hill, Victoria
- Died: 1 November 1918 (aged 37); 2nd New Zealand General Hospital, Walton-on-Thames, England
- Original team: West Melbourne

Playing career^{1}
Years	Club	Games (Goals)
1903	Melbourne	3 (1)
1904	Carlton	3 (0)
Total		6 (1)
- ^{1} Playing statistics correct to the end of 1904.

Albert John Gourlay (31 July 1881 – 1 November 1918) was an Australian rules footballer who played with Melbourne and Carlton in the Victorian Football League (VFL). He died of wounds sustained in action during World War I.

== Family ==
The son of John Ebenezer Gourlay (1853-), and Jessie Bruce Gourlay (1862–1889), née Bell, Albert John Gourlay was born at Emerald Hill on 31 July 1881.

He married Emma Randle Porteous (c.1871-1954), née Collie, in New Zealand, in 1909.

== Football ==
Gourlay played his early football at West Melbourne before entering the VFL. He played just three games for Melbourne, in the 1903 VFL season and at the end of the year crossed to Carlton. Playing as a defender, Gourlay made three appearances with Carlton and experienced all possible results, a win, draw and a loss.

== New Zealand ==
He later emigrated to New Zealand, where he got married and worked as a commercial traveller in Wellington.

== Military service ==
In 1917 he signed up to serve his adopted country in the war and, in August 1917, travelled on the MMNZT 92 Ruahine, to the United Kingdom with the New Zealand Expeditionary Force.

Gourlay fought with the 29th Reinforcements of the Wellington Infantry Regiment, B Company, on the front and suffered serious wounds when fighting in some of the final offensives of the war.

== Death ==
He died of the wounds he had sustained in action at a military hospital in England just ten days before the ceasefire. He is buried at Brookwood Military Cemetery, Woking, Surrey, England.

== See also ==
- List of Victorian Football League players who died on active service
