= Ken MacLeod (Australian footballer) =

Australian rules footballer

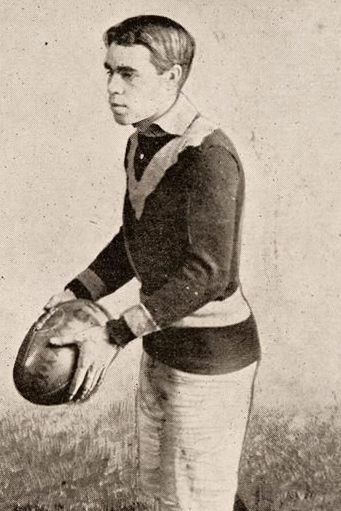
- MacLeod in 1910

Personal information
- Full name: James Kenneth MacLeod
- Born: 18 August 1890; Warrnambool, Victoria
- Died: 8 April 1940 (aged 49); HMS Glowworm, Norwegian Sea
- Original team: Hawthorn College

Playing career^{1}
Years	Club	Games (Goals)
1910–13	University	54 (33)
- ^{1} Playing statistics correct to the end of 1913.

James Kenneth MacLeod (18 August 1890 – 8 April 1940) was an Australian rules footballer who played with University in the Victorian Football League (VFL).

== Family ==
The son of James MacLeod (1859-1938), and Hughina Walker MacLeod (1860-1920), née McCallum, James Kenneth MacLeod was born at Warrnambool, Victoria on 18 August 1890.

He married Freda May Potter in 1922.

== Education ==
MacLeod was educated at the Hawthorn College, and at the University of Melbourne.

=== B.Mech.E. ===
While studying mechanical engineering at the University of Melbourne, he gained a "blue" in football.

His degree, Bachelor of Mechanical Engineering (B.Mech.E.) was conferred upon him, in absentia, on 23 December 1919.

== Football ==
He played 54 games and scored 33 goals over four seasons (1910 to 1913) with Melbourne University Football Club in the VFL.

"A rover, McLeod (sic) was regarded as a tremendous goal-sneak and undoubtedly was one of the Students' most accomplished players.

== Military service ==
He served in the Australian Navy in World War I, and later moved to England.

In World War II he worked for the British war office, before he got a commission in the Royal Navy.

== Death ==
He was killed in the sinking of HMS Glowworm (H92) in the Norwegian Sea on 8 April 1940.

Although initially "presumed killed in action", a note on his service record (dated 1 May 1940) reports: "Not included in published list of "Glowworm" casualties Admiralty having unconfirmed report that he may be prisoner of war." A further note (dated 6 October 1942) reports: "Death on April 8th 1940 now presumed."

He has no known grave. He is commemorated at the Plymouth Naval Memorial.

== See also ==
- List of Victorian Football League players who died on active service
