= Kenneth G. McLeod =

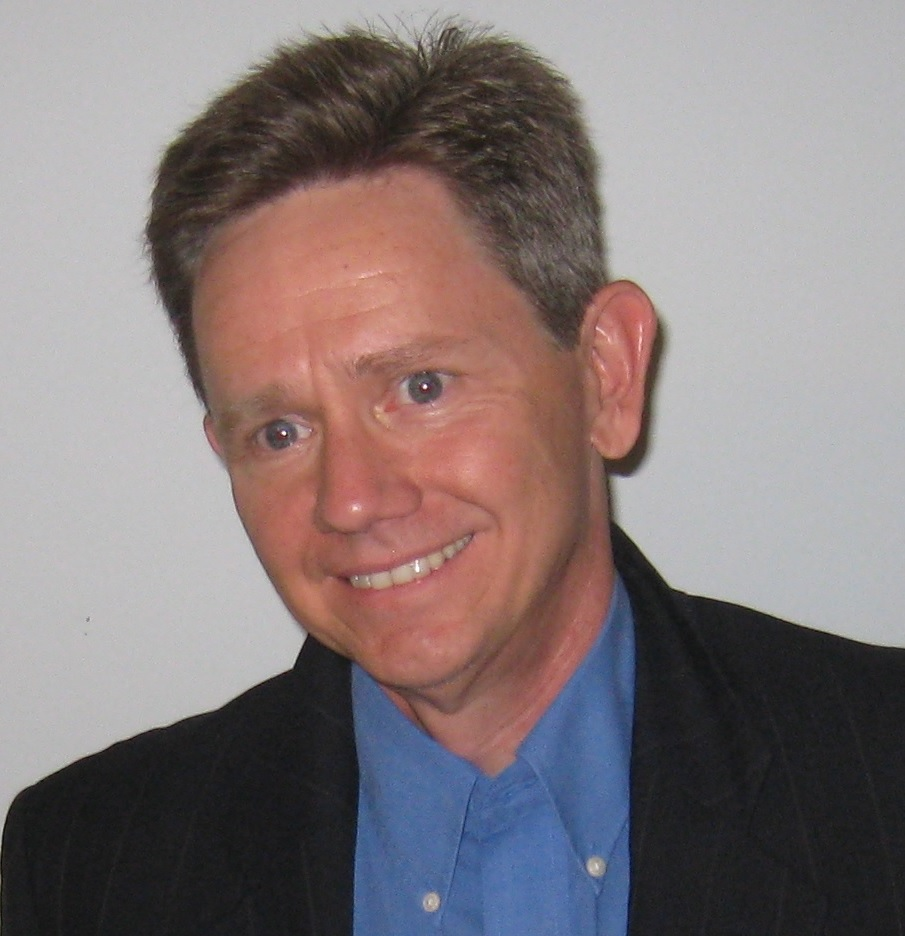
- Kenneth G. McLeod
- Born: Kenneth G. McLeod; June 15, 1962 (age 64); Mobile, Alabama
- Occupations: Teacher, writer, Christian apologist
- Writing career
- Genre: Christian literature
- Subject: Christian apologetics

Kenneth G. McLeod (born 1962) is a Christian apologist, radio talk show host, teacher, writer and founder of the Christian apologetics ministry: Faith Worth Defending. He is an Evangelical Christian and the author of A Well Reasoned Faith: A Rational Defense of God, Jesus and the Bible; Evidence for Skeptics: Answering the biggest Challenges to Christianity; College Christian: How to get your college degree without losing your Christian faith, and other titles.

== Family and education ==
Kenneth G. McLeod was born in Mobile, Alabama in 1962. He was one of two children born to Frankie and Bettie McLeod. He was an average student in school and did not become interested in education until his senior year of high school. After graduating from Mary G. Montgomery High School, McLeod studied electronics engineering and began a career in the technology industry. Restless to get back into school, he completed two master's degrees, one in business and one in education. After almost 20 years of the corporate world, he started a career in teaching. After a few years teaching mathematics at the high school and university level, he completed a PhD in education from the University of Southern Mississippi. Shortly after, he studied Christian apologetics at Biola University and became a member of the International Society of Christian Apologetics. In 2013, McLeod founded Faith Worth Defending Apologetics Ministry.

== Career and Ministry ==
According to McLeod, he was converted to Christianity at a young age, but began to see conflicts in science and his faith in the area of evolutionary biology. To reconcile this apparent conflict, he began a study of Christian apologetics in the early ‘90s. As a result of this study, he began a lifelong passion for apologetics, as well as a passion for helping others work through doubts about the validity of Christianity. He has been a guest speaker at churches and universities.

== Apologetic Arguments ==
McLeod's writings center on arguments for the existence of God, the legitimacy of Christianity as the only path to God, and the authenticity of the Bible. In A Well Reasoned Faith: A Rational Defense of God, Jesus and the Bible (2011), arguments for the existence of God are made on the cosmological, teleological and moral arguments. Arguments for Christianity are made using logical reasoning, historical evidence, eyewitness testimony, and archaeology. Arguments for the authenticity of the bible come from applying the bibliographical, internal and external tests.

== Works by McLeod ==
- The Prize (2010)
- A Well Reasoned Faith: A Rational Defense of God, Jesus and the Bible (2012)
- Evidence for Skeptics: Answering the Biggest Challenges to Christianity (2013)
- Faith Worth Defending: A 12-Week Christian Apologetics Course (2013)
- College Christian: How to get your college degree without losing your Christian faith (2014)
- Faith Worth Defending: How to Defend your Christian Faith in a Skeptical Culture (2014)
