= Alby Landt =

Australian rules footballer

Personal information
- Full name: Albert George Landt
- Born: 19 September 1888; Cannum, Victoria
- Died: 9 November 1954 (aged 66); Warracknabeal, Victoria
- Original team: Jeparit / Melbourne High

Playing career^{1}
Years	Club	Games (Goals)
1908	St Kilda	4 (0)
- ^{1} Playing statistics correct to the end of 1908.

Albert George Landt (19 September 1888 – 9 November 1954) was an Australian rules footballer who played for the St Kilda Football Club in the Victorian Football League (VFL).
