= Dick Clough =

Australian rules footballer

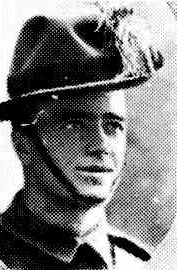

Personal information
- Full name: Richard Henry Clough
- Born: 2 March 1884; Williamstown, Victoria
- Died: 2 June 1915 (aged 31) off Gallipoli, Ottoman Turkey
- Original team: Coburg Juniors
- Height: 174 cm (5 ft 9 in)

Playing career^{1}
Years	Club	Games (Goals)
1907–1908	Essendon	2 (0)
- ^{1} Playing statistics correct to the end of 1908.

Richard Henry Clough (2 March 1884 – 2 June 1915) was an Australian rules footballer who played with Essendon in the Victorian Football League (VFL), who died as a result of the wounds he sustained on active service in World War I.

== Family ==
The son of Joseph Richard Clough (1863–1936), and Louisa Mary Clough (1866–1931), née Hobbs, Richard Henry Clough was born in Williamstown on 2 March 1884.

He married Catherine Maud Alice "Kitty" Cox (1885–1945), later, Mrs Bartholomew Cotter, in 1906.

== Football ==
=== Essendon (VFL) ===
Recruited from Coburg Juniors, Clough made two VFL appearance for Essendon. The first came in the 1907 season, Essendon's round seven loss to Carlton at Princes Park, noted as the 104 points Carlton scored was then the most Essendon had ever conceded in a VFL fixture. His other game for Essendon was in the seventh round of the 1908 VFL season, a six-point win over Melbourne at the MCG.

=== North Melbourne (VFA) ===
He was granted a permit in 1909 to join North Melbourne in the Victorian Football Association.

== Military service ==
Clough, who was married and employed as a telephone linesman, enlisted for armed service on 29 October 1914. He enlisted in Mackay, Queensland, but gave his address as North Williamstown.

On 21 December, Clough and his unit, the 5th Light Horse Regiment, embarked from Sydney, on board the Transport A34 Persic. They arrived in Egypt on 1 February 1915 and in May were deployed to Gallipoli.

== Death ==
He was wounded in action in Gallipoli on 2 June, a gunshot had penetrated his chest and abdomen.

On 2 June 1915, on board the HMT Gascon, Clough died of his wounds and was buried at sea three miles off the coast of Gaba Tepe.

He was posthumously awarded the British War Medal.

== See also ==
- List of Victorian Football League players who died on active service
