= Lou Holmes (footballer) =

Australian rules footballer (1892–1915)

Personal information
- Full name: Louis Gordon Holmes
- Born: 7 July 1892; Launceston, Tasmania
- Died: 23 June 1915 (aged 22); Gallipoli, Ottoman Turkey
- Original team: Launceston

Playing career^{1}
Years	Club	Games (Goals)
1910	St Kilda	1 (0)
- ^{1} Playing statistics correct to the end of 1910.

Louis Gordon Holmes (7 July 1892 – 23 June 1915) was an Australian rules footballer who played with St Kilda in the Victorian Football League. He was killed in Gallipoli in World War I.

== Family ==
The son of Louis Saengar Holmes (1859–1926), and Lucy Mary Holmes (-1935), née Newton, Louis Gordon Holmes was born in Launceston, Tasmania on 7 July 1892.

== Football ==
The Late Capt. L.G. Holmes.
Captain L. Gordon Holmes, only son of Dr. Holmes, of Norwood,
has died from wounds he received in the Dardanelles.
Captain Holmes, who was well known as an athlete, left Adelaide
as a Lieutenant of the 10th Battalion, and was promoted to captain
in Egypt, where he was A.D.C. to Brigadier Maclagan, on the head-
quarters staff of the 3rd Brigade, with Major Brand.
Captain Holmes was born in Tasmania and educated at Wesley
College, Melbourne, where he gained his blue for football and rowing.
He attended the University [of Adelaide], where he had a success-
ful scholastic career, and on the athletic side he was in the University
rowing and football teams.
He also rowed in the South Australian crew.
Captain Holmes before the war was studying for a military career.
He was widely popular.
The Adelaide Chronicle, 17 July 1915).

Following his VFL career, Holmes moved to South Australia and studied at the University of Adelaide, where he received a double blue for Rowing and Australian rules football.

== Death ==
He died on 23 June 1915, on the hospital ship H.M.H.S. Gascon, of the abdominal shrapnel wounds that he had sustained in action on 16 June 1915.

He was buried at sea on 24 June 1915, three miles from Gaba Tepe.

=== Commemorated ===
He is commemorated at the Lone Pine Cemetery near Gallipoli, Turkey.

== See also ==
- List of Victorian Football League players who died on active service

== Sources ==
- Holmesby, Russell & Main, Jim (2007). The Encyclopedia of AFL Footballers. 7th ed. Melbourne: Bas Publishing.
- Over a Precipice: Green Hill Road Accident: Motorist's Wonderful Escape, The (Adelaide) Journal, (Tuesday, 7 January 1913), p.1.
- Captain Louis Gordon Holmes, The AIF Project, UNSW Canberra.
- First World War Nominal Roll: Captain Louis Gordon Holmes, collection of the Australian War Memorial.
- First World War Embarkation Roll: Lieutenant Louis Gordon Holmes, collection of the Australian War Memorial.
- World War One Service Record: Captain Louis Gordon Holmes, at National Archives of Australia.
- Roll of Honour Circular: Captain Louis Gordon Holmes, at Australian War Memorial.
- Roll of Honour: Captain Louis Gordon Holmes, at Australian War Memorial.
- Wesley College Roll of Honour: Captain Louis Gordon Holmes.
- Virtual War Memorial Australia: Captain Louis Gordon Holmes.
