= Malcolm Kennedy (footballer) =

Australian rules footballer (1892–1918)

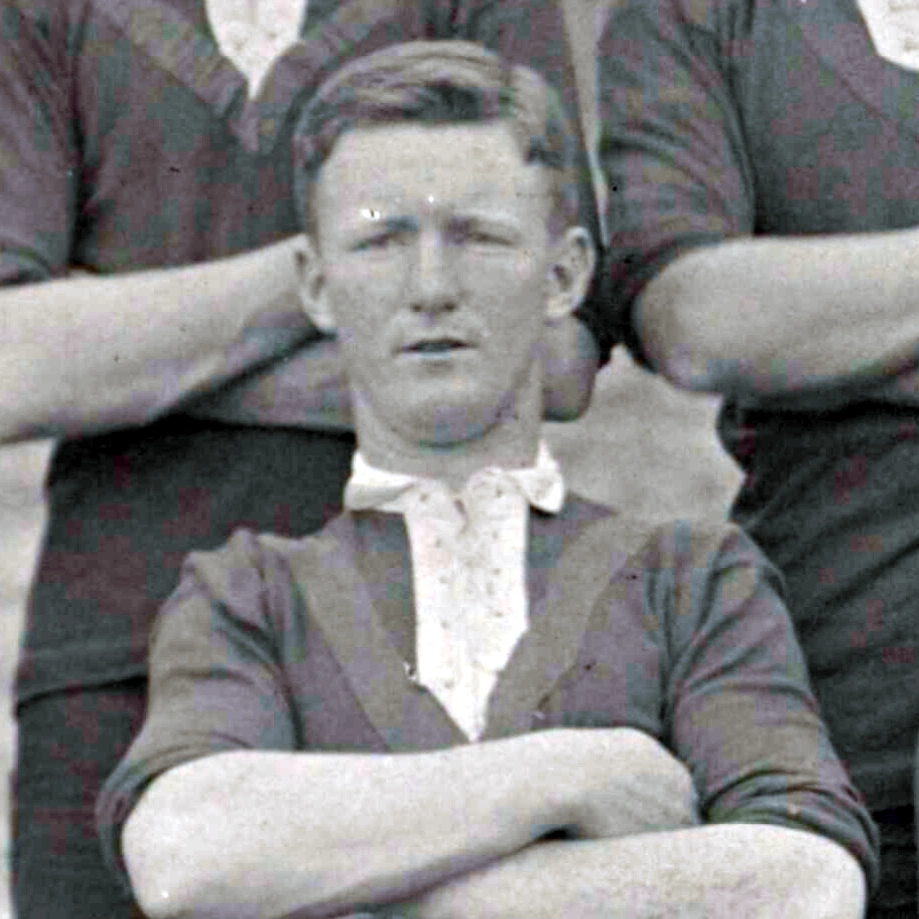
- Malcolm Stuart Kennedy, R.M.C. Duntroon First XVIII, 1913

Personal information
- Full name: Malcolm Stuart Kennedy
- Born: 30 October 1892; Kew, Victoria
- Died: 2 January 1918 (aged 25); Dranouter, Belgium

Playing career^{1}
Years	Club	Games (Goals)
1911–12	Melbourne	17 (4)
- ^{1} Playing statistics correct to the end of 1912.

Malcolm Stuart Kennedy (30 October 1892 – 2 January 1918) was an Australian rules footballer who played with Melbourne in the Victorian Football League (VFL). (Note: Note that although the VFL/AFL records have "Mal Kennedy" and, therefore, the Melbourne Football Club's records also have "Mal Kennedy" (his "registered" name), he was never known as "Mal"; it was always "Malcolm" to his family and friends (per private communication from his nephew).) He was killed in action on active service in Belgium in World War I.

== Family ==
Malcolm was the eldest of three sons of Robert Kennedy and Clementina Sobieska Stuart Kennedy (née Robertson), he was born on 30 October 1892 in Kew, Victoria.

== Education ==
He attended Camberwell Grammar School, Queen's College, Hobart (which was later absorbed by The Hutchins School), University of Melbourne, and Royal Military College, Duntroon.

== Sportsman ==
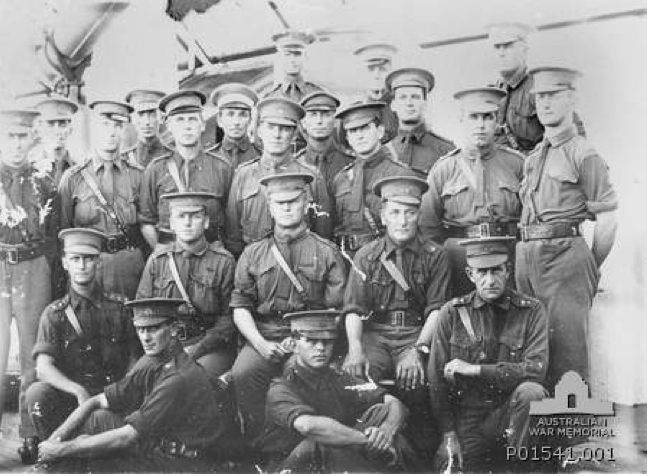
Captain M.S. Kennedy (standing, far right), among the officers of the Fifth Australian Light Horse, at sea, en route to Egypt in December 1914. His Duntroon classmate, Robert Nimmo on ground, at centre front. (Note: Although the Australian War Memorial's card reference () claims that Robert Nimmo was a "Major"; no doubt due to the single "thing" on his shoulder, which was, obviously, thought to be a "crown", rather than what it must have been: a "bath star" or "pip" (see British Army officer rank insignia). Nimmo's service record (, page 27) clearly shows that he was a (two "pip") Lieutenant at the time of the photograph. Perhaps Nimmo had borrowed a shirt from a (one "pip") Second Lieutenant for the photograph.)

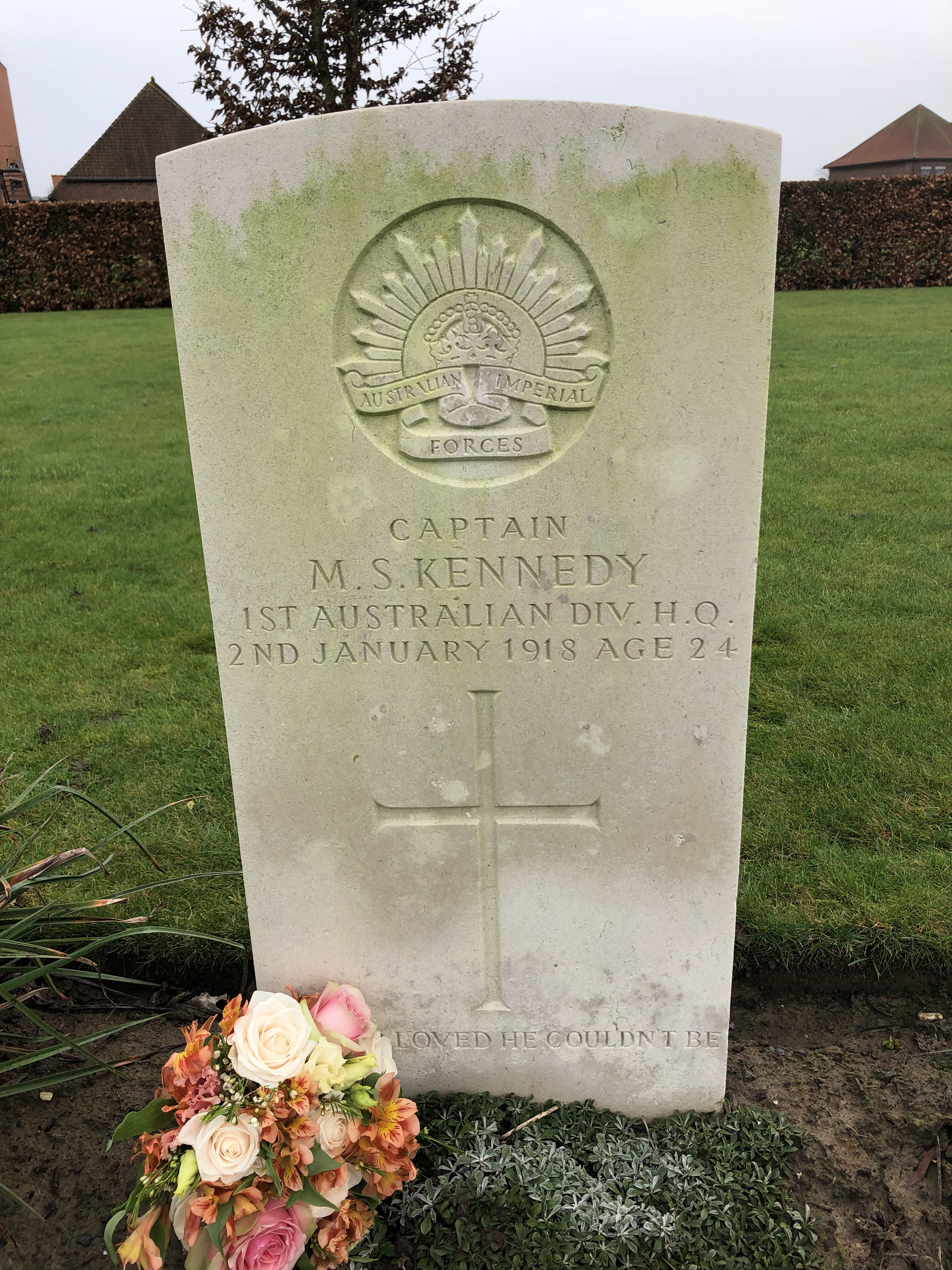
Gravestone of Captain Malcolm Stuart Kennedy, the engraving reads "Greater Loved He Couldn't Be"

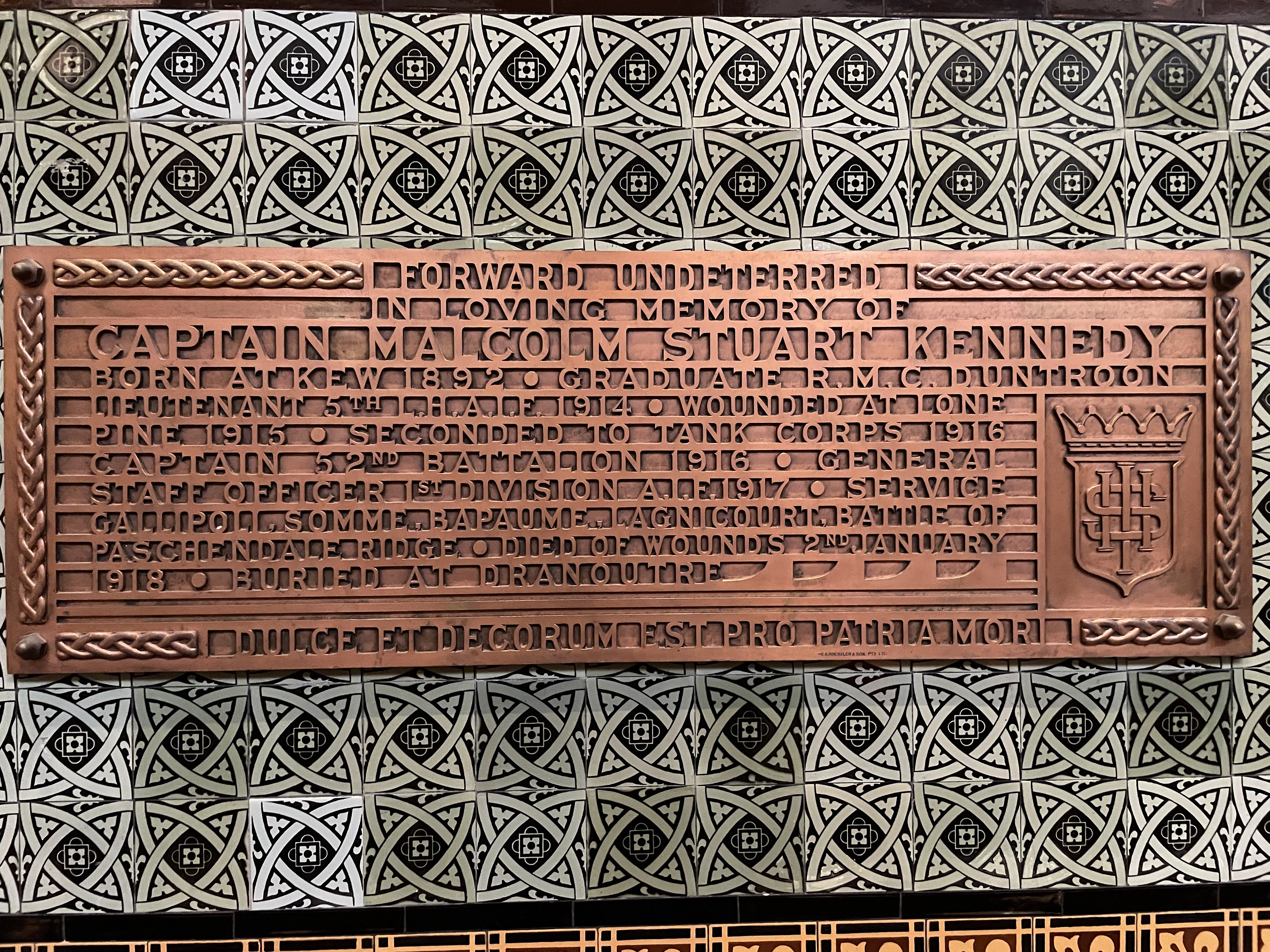
The memorial tablet dedicated to Malcolm Stuart Kennedy located at Saint Paul's Cathedral, Melbourne.

Recruited from Blackburn, aged 18, he played his first senior VFL match for Melbourne, against Collingwood, at Victoria Park on 3 June 1911. Melbourne lost by a six points; Kennedy kicked one goal.

He went on to play a total of seventeen games for Melbourne; eleven games in twelve rounds in 1911, kicking four goals, and six games in seven rounds in 1912 (no goals). Before the 1912 season commenced, the VFL instituted the convention of all players wearing a distinctive, large, conspicuous, personal number on the back of their guernsey (to promote sales of The Football Record, which supplied lists of the player numbers); therefore, when Kennedy ran out on to the Melbourne Cricket Ground, on Saturday 27 April 1912, the first round of the 1912 VFL season, to play against Collingwood he was the first Melbourne player to wear the number 12 guernsey.

He played his last match against Essendon, at the Melbourne Cricket Ground, on the King's Birthday Holiday, Monday, 3 June 1912. In the reports of the day, there is no indication that he was either injured or played badly; and, further, none of the contemporary newspapers give any indication at all of any possible reason that might explain why that match was Kennedy's last game for Melbourne.

In 1913, he represented Duntroon at Australian rules football, rugby union, playing as a forward, and at cricket.

On 6 September 1913, at the second annual sports carnival of the Royal Military College, Kennedy came third in the finals of the 100 yards, 220 yards handicap, and 440 yards races, the heats having been conducted over the previous fortnight.

== Professional soldier ==
He was in the second (1913) intake of cadets at Duntroon, announced on 13 January 1913. His Corps of Staff Cadets (CSC) number was 82.

Britain's declaration of war on Germany on 4 August, meant that Australia was also at war.

Due to the direct, personal representations of Lord Kitchener, the graduation of thirty of the cadets in the second intake, including Kennedy, were accelerated, and they were immediately given commissions as Lieutenants.

Fifteen of the thirty R.M.C. graduates were allotted to the infantry, to serve under Colonel John Monash, and the other fifteen, including Kennedy and Robert Harold Nimmo (later, Lieutenant General Nimmo), were allotted to the Light Horse.

It was announced in The Sydney Morning Herald of 24 March 1916, that Captain M.S. Kennedy of the Light Horse had "passed the course of instruction under the Defence Act for the rank of major". However his military record has no record of such training; it seems that there was a misunderstanding as his military record (p. 14) shows that Kennedy "obtained "distinguished" pass at the School of Musketry Hythe, [and] also qualified in mechanism of the Lewis Gun" in February 1916.

He lies buried at Dranoutre Military Cemetery in Belgium.

== Remembered ==
His name appears with 41 others on a memorial honour board, displayed at Duntroon, commemorating the memory of the 42 graduates of the Royal Military College of Australia who died during their military service in the Great War. and the Greensborough District's War Memorial Cenotaph. At evensong on Friday 23 November 1928, a memorial tablet dedicated to Malcolm Kennedy was unveiled by the Anglican Archbishop of Melbourne, Harrington Lees, on the eastern wall of St Paul's Cathedral, Melbourne. The tablet's inscription read:

Forward Undeterred.
In loving memory of Captain Malcolm Stuart Kennedy, born at Kew, 1892; graduate R.M.C., Duntroon; Lieut. 5th L. H.,. A.I.F., 1914; Wounded at Lone Pine, 1915; seconded to Tank Corps, 1916; Captain 57th Battalion, 1916; General Staff Officer, 1st Division, A.I.F., 1917. Service, Gallipoli, Somme, Bapaume, Lignicourt, Battle of Passchendaele Ridge, died of wounds, 2nd January, 1918. Buried at Dranoutre.
Dulce et decorum est pro patria mori.

— The Argus, Friday, 23 November 1928.

== See also ==
- List of Victorian Football League players who died on active service
