= Bismarck Kulpa =

Australian rules footballer

Personal information
- Full name: Ferdinand Ottoman Bismarck Kulpa
- Born: 17 November 1886; Carlton, Victoria
- Died: 16 November 1960 (aged 73); Maryborough, Victoria
- Original team: Preston

Playing career^{1}
Years	Club	Games (Goals)
1908	St Kilda	2 (0)
- ^{1} Playing statistics correct to the end of 1908.

Ferdinand Ottoman Bismarck Kulpa (17 November 1886 – 16 November 1960) was an Australian rules footballer who played with St Kilda in the Victorian Football League (VFL).
