= Artie Harrison =

Australian footballer

Personal information
- Full name: Arthur Charles Harrison
- Born: 8 February 1893; Collingwood, Victoria
- Died: 3 May 1917 (aged 24); Bullecourt, France
- Original team: Preston Juniors
- Height: 173 cm (5 ft 8 in)
- Weight: 70 kg (154 lb)

Playing career^{1}
| Years | Club | Games (Goals) |
| 1911 | Richmond | 1 (0) |
| 1913–1914 | Fitzroy | 19 (3) |
| Total | | 20 (3) |
- ^{1} Playing statistics correct to the end of 1914.

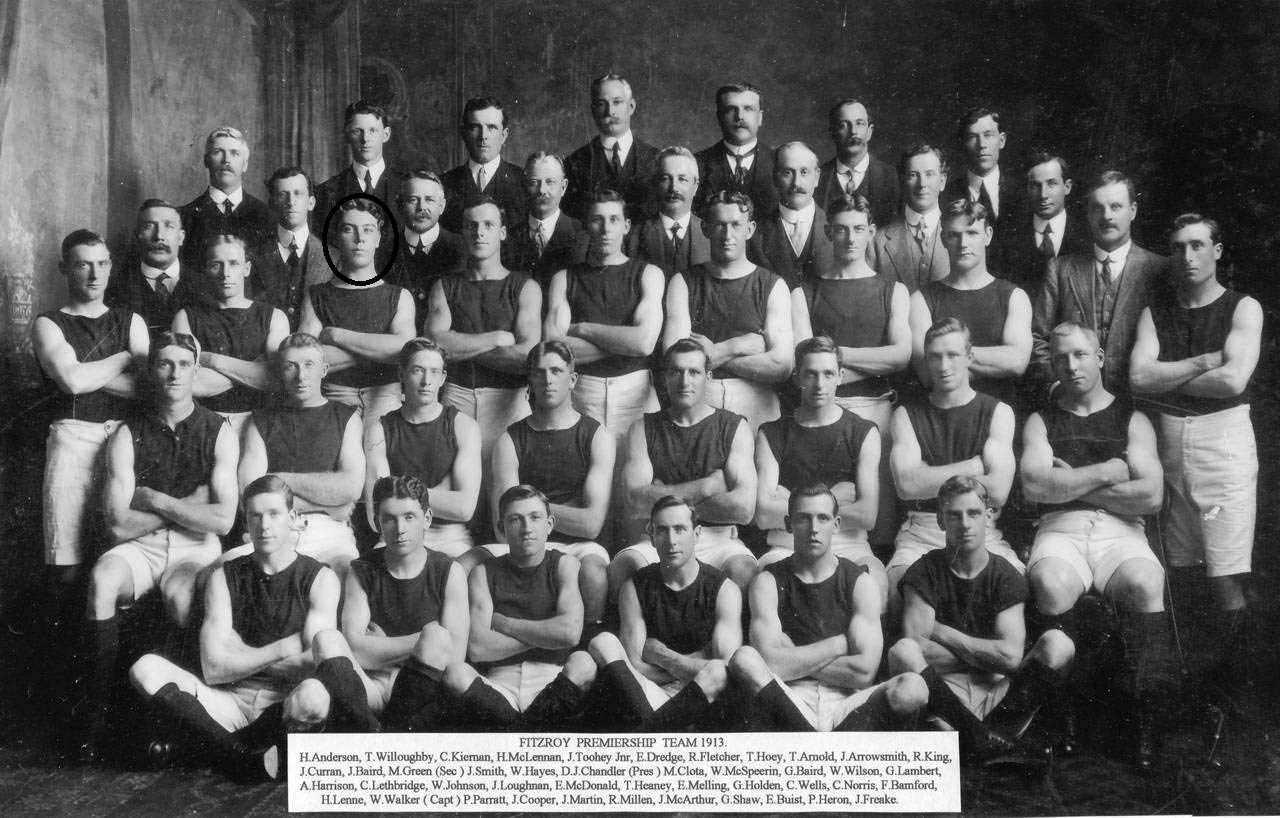

Arthur Charles Harrison (8 February 1893 – 3 May 1917) was an Australian rules footballer who played for the Richmond Football Club and Fitzroy Football Club in the Victorian Football League. He played in Fitzroy's 1913 premiership side after two players were ruled out due to injury and suspension respectively. He was killed at Bullecourt in World War I.

== See also ==
- List of Victorian Football League players who died on active service

== Sources ==
- Holmesby, Russell & Main, Jim (2007). The Encyclopedia of AFL Footballers. 7th ed. Melbourne: Bas Publishing.
- Artie Harrison's playing statistics from AFL Tables
