= Harold Zucker =

Australian rules footballer (1917–1947)

Personal information
- Full name: Harold Walter Zucker
- Born: 23 December 1917; Saddleworth, South Australia
- Died: 7 July 1947 (aged 29); Plympton, South Australia
- Original team: Saddleworth
- Height: 191 cm (6 ft 3 in)
- Weight: 86 kg (190 lb)

Playing career^{1}
| Years | Club | Games (Goals) |
| 1938–1942, 1946 | Sturt | 51 (59) |
| 1942 | Hawthorn | 3 (3) |
- ^{1} Playing statistics correct to the end of 1946.

Harold Walter Zucker (23 December 1917 – 7 June 1947) was an Australian rules footballer who played with Hawthorn in the Victorian Football League (VFL). He kicked three goals in his three games for the club. He also played for the Sturt Football Club in the South Australian National Football League (SANFL).

== Family ==
The son of Friedrich William Zucker (1884–1937) and Ida Mary Zucker (?–1976), née Becker (later, Mrs C. Gangell), Harold Walter Zucker was born in Saddleworth, South Australia, on 23 December 1917.

He married Esma Mary DeVerneis (1926–2008) (later known as Mrs. John William O'Brien) on 10 September 1945. They had one son, Geoffrey.

== Football ==
A 191-centimetre (6 ft 3 in) ruckman, he played with the Saddleworth Football Club in the Mid North Football Association, the Sturt Football Club in the South Australian National Football League (SANFL), and the Hawthorn Football Club in the Victorian Football League (VFL).

== Military service ==
Having enlisted in August 1942, he served in the Second AIF.

== Employment ==
On his return from the Second AIF, he was employed as a fireman.

== Death ==
He was unable to play for Sturt in 1947 due to the protracted illness, from which he subsequently died at Plympton, South Australia, on 7 June 1947.

Buried at Adelaide's West Terrace Cemetery, his funeral was well attended by ex-footballers and members of the fire brigade. A minute's silence was observed by players and officials before the start of the 7 June 1947 match between Saddleworth (his former team) and Riverton.

== Sources ==
- Holmesby, Russell & Main, Jim (2007). The Encyclopedia of AFL Footballers. 7th ed. Melbourne: Bas Publishing.
- World War Two Nominal Roll: Corporal Harold Walter Zucker (SX21526), collection of the Australian War Memorial.
- World War Two Service Record: Corporal Harold Walter Zucker (SX21526), National Archives of Australia.
- Roll of Honour: Corporal Harold Walter Zucker (SX21526), Australian War Memorial.
- Corporal Harold Walter Zucker (SX21526), Commonwealth War Graves Commission.
