= Alf Giblett =

Australian rules footballer

Personal information
- Full name: Alfred Rowton Giblett
- Born: 30 May 1908; Warrnambool, Victoria
- Died: 19 June 1943 (aged 35); Territory of New Guinea
- Original team: South Hawthorn United
- Height: 182 cm (6 ft 0 in)
- Weight: 78 kg (172 lb)

Playing career^{1}
Years	Club	Games (Goals)
1935	Hawthorn	9 (0)
- ^{1} Playing statistics correct to the end of 1935.

Alfred Rowton Giblett (30 May 1908 – 19 June 1943) was an Australian rules footballer who played for the Hawthorn Football Club in the Victorian Football League (VFL). He was killed in action in World War II.

== Family ==
Son of Samuel Robert Giblett (1873–1940), and Edith Sarah Giblett (1872–1956), née Small, Alfred Rowton Giblett was born at Warrnambool on 30 May 1908.

He married Valma Olive Cocking (1911–1994), at Surrey Hill, on 21 December 1935. They had three children; Patricia Mary Aughterson (née Giblett) (1937–2020), Anthony Jackson Giblett (1939–2010), and Lynne (1942–?).

== Football ==
Having been declared the best and fairest player in the A Grade of the Eastern Suburbs Churches Association in both 1933 and 1934, Giblett was granted a clearance from South Hawthorn United (formerly South Hawthorn Presbyterians) to Hawthorn on 24 April 1935.

== Military service ==
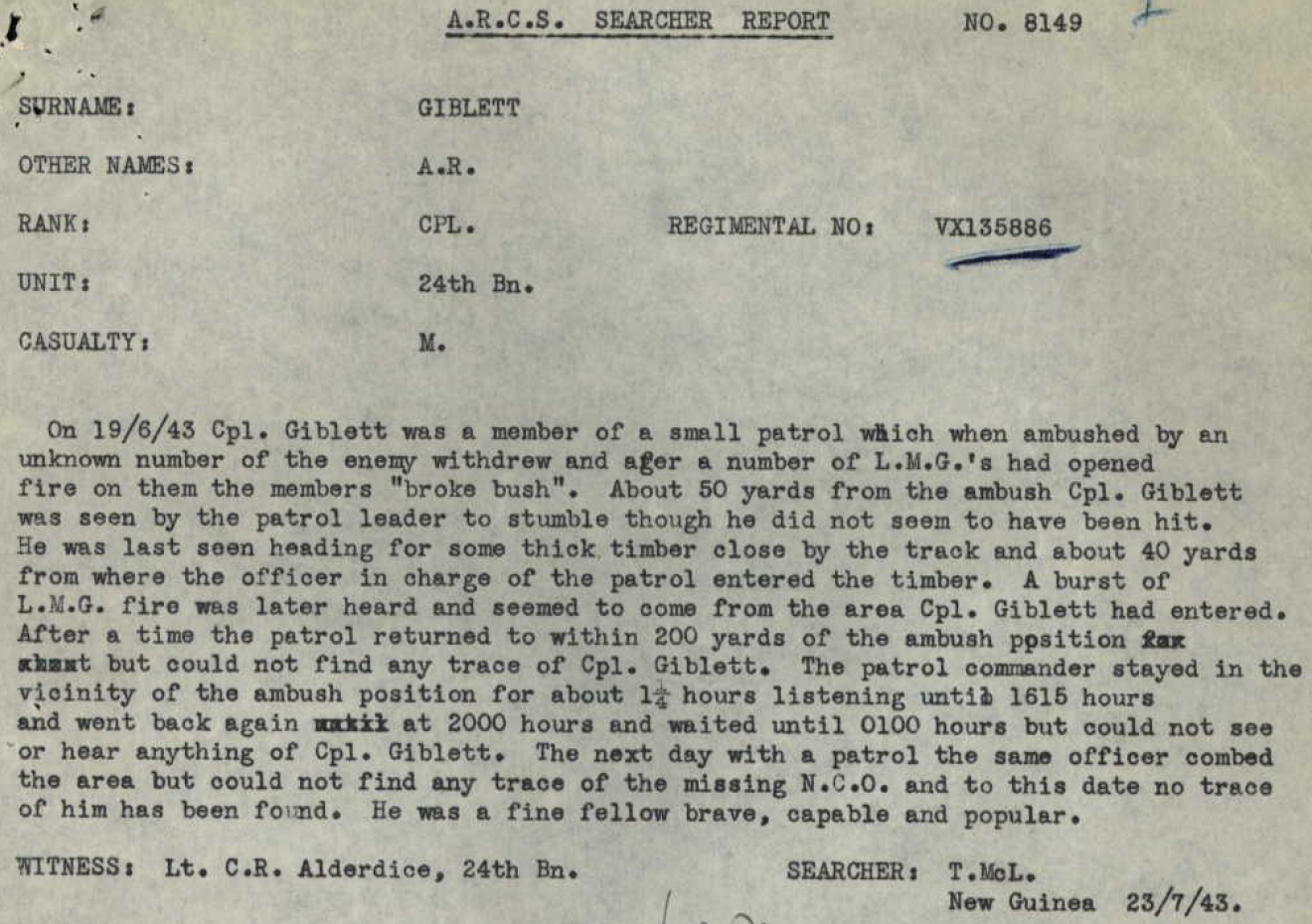
The Australian Red Cross "wounded and Missing" Searcher's Report (on Service File).

He enlisted in the Second AIF and served overseas with the 2/24th Battalion.

== Death ==
He was reported "missing in action" whilst under light machine gun (L.M.G.) fire on 19 June 1943; and, on the basis of evidence that was presented to an official investigation, it was recommended that the official records be reclassified to read "Missing believed Killed".

== Commemorated ==
He has no known grave. He is commemorated at the Port Moresby War Cemetery.

== See also ==
- List of Victorian Football League players who died on active service
