= Cordner =

Cordner is a surname. Notable people with the surname include:

- Alan Cordner (1890–1915), Australian rules footballer
- Boyd Cordner (born 1992), Australian professional rugby league player
- Christopher Cordner (born 1949), Australian philosopher
- Denis Cordner (1924–1990), Australian rules football player
- Don Cordner (1922–2009), Australian rules footballer
- Douglas Cordner (1887–1946), Irish cricketer
- Edward Cordner (1887–1963), Australian rules footballer
- Elijah Cordner (born 2007), Trinidadian footballer
- Harry Cordner (1885–1943), Australian rules footballer
- Jock Cordner (1910–1996), Australian rules footballer
- John Cordner (politician) (1816–1894), first Unitarian minister in Canada
- John Cordner (sportsman) (1929–2016), Australian sportsman
- Laurence Cordner (1911–1992), Australian sportsman
- Michael Cordner, academic, author and specialist in theatre and drama
- Robert Cordner (born 1932), Canadian sprint canoeist
- Ted Cordner (1919–1996), Australian rules footballer

== See also ==
- Cordner–Eggleston Cup, historic private school Australian rules football competition
- Alexander and Nellie P. Cordner House, historic Victorian Eclectic house in Orem, Utah
- Cordner–Calder House, built in 1894 by William Cordner in Orem, Utah
- William James and Edna Cordner House, built c.1898 in Orem, Utah
- Corder (disambiguation)
- Corner (disambiguation)
