= Otto O'Pelt =

Australian rules footballer

Personal information
- Full name: Otto Albert O'Pelt
- Born: 12 February 1888; Port Melbourne, Victoria
- Died: 11 July 1963 (aged 75); Camberwell, Victoria

Playing career^{1}
Years	Club	Games (Goals)
1911	St Kilda	1 (0)
- ^{1} Playing statistics correct to the end of 1911.

Otto Albert O'Pelt (12 February 1888 – 11 July 1963) was an Australian rules footballer who played with St Kilda in the Victorian Football League (VFL).

== Family ==
The son of Julius Richard Opelt (1849–1915), and Rosa Opelt (1864–1947), née Drews, Otto Albert Opelt was born at Port Melbourne on 12 February 1888.

== Football ==
Recruited from the Metropolitan Football Association (MFA) club Oakleigh, and selected as a rover, Opelt played his first and only First XVIII match for St Kilda in its 2.3 (15) to 18.21 (129) loss against Carlton, at Princes park, on 29 July 1911.

On Tuesday, 26 July 1911, 18 dissatisfied senior players — Gordon Dangerfield, Bert Butler, Wally Scott, Reg Gregson, Hugh Plowman, Tom Baird, Sam Mortimer, Harry Lever, Harold Parker, Matt Outen, Ken McKenzie, Artie Thomas, Ernie Sellars, Bill O'Brien, Henry Merrett, Bob Briggs, Wels Eicke, and Wally Graham — informed the St Kilda Football Club officials that "they would not be available for the rest of the season".

Opelt was one of the nine new players in the last-minute, stopgap senior team selected for the game against Carlton; the others were Alby Bowtell, Roy Cazaly, Claude Crowl, Peter Donnelly, Alf Hammond, Rowley Smith, Tom Soutar, and Bill Ward. Including that match — and ignoring the experienced Harrie Hattam (16 games), Bert Pierce (41 games), and Bill Woodcock (65 games) — the team's remaining six players had only played a total of 37 senior matches.

== Death ==
He died at Camberwell, Victoria on 11 July 1963.
