= David Cordner =

Australian rules footballer (born 1962)

Personal information
- Born: 25 May 1962 (age 64)
- Original team: Old Melburnians (VAFA)
- Height: 192 cm (6 ft 4 in)
- Weight: 92 kg (203 lb)

Playing career^{1}
Years	Club	Games (Goals)
1982–1987	Melbourne	53 (61)
1988	Sydney Swans	5 (6)
Total		58 (67)
- ^{1} Playing statistics correct to the end of 1988.

David Baillieu Cordner (born 25 May 1962) is a former Australian rules footballer who played with Melbourne and the Sydney Swans in the Victorian Football League (VFL).

== Family ==
Cordner's father, Ted, was a member of Melbourne's 1941 premiership team. Three uncles also played with Melbourne in the VFL, two-time best and fairest winner Denis, Brownlow Medalist Don and John, who also represented Victoria in cricket. David's grandfather, Edward, played twice for Melbourne in 1905 and appeared in a further 60 games with University.

== Career ==
=== Melbourne ===
A key forward, Cordner started his career in the Victorian Amateur Football Association (VAFA), with Old Melburnians.

Cordner had a prolific Under-19s season in 1981, when he kicked over 100 goals. This included a 12-goal haul in Melbourne's semi-final win over Hawthorn and five in their grand final win over Geelong.

In his first two seasons with the seniors, Cordner struggled with injury, but in the 1984 VFL season put together 17 games. His 32 goals that year were bettered by only one teammate, Kelvin Templeton (51).

He kicked seven goals against Fitzroy on the Melbourne Cricket Ground in the opening round of the 1985 season. For the rest of the season he kicked only 14 more goals, but he was also used as a defender.

In 1986 he missed the early part of the season with a broken collarbone and only managed nine appearances that year.

=== Sydney ===
Cordner decided to change clubs in 1988, after making just one appearance for Melbourne in 1987. Talks were held with Geelong and Footscray, but it was the Sydney Swans that secured his services, on a one-year contract. The Swans were looking for a key forward to cover the loss of Warwick Capper, who had gone to the Brisbane Bears.

He played only five games for the Swans, the last in round seven.
