= Alf Hammond =

Australian rules footballer

Personal information
- Full name: Alfred Richard Hammond
- Born: 30 July 1887; Fitzroy, Victoria
- Died: 18 July 1961 (aged 73); Parkville, Victoria

Playing career^{1}
Years	Club	Games (Goals)
1911	St Kilda	1 (0)
- ^{1} Playing statistics correct to the end of 1911.

Alfred Richard Hammond (30 July 1887 – 18 July 1961) was an Australian rules footballer who played for the St Kilda Football Club in the Victorian Football League (VFL).

== Football ==
One of nine new players in the team, Hammond played his only First XVIII match for St Kilda against Carlton, at Princes park, on 29 July 1911. They were required because many of the regular St Kilda First XVIII players were on strike.

The other new players were: Alby Bowtell, Roy Cazaly, Claude Crowl, Peter Donnelly, Otto Opelt, Rowley Smith, Tom Soutar, and Bill Ward — and, including that match, and ignoring Harrie Hattam (16 games), Bert Pierce (41 games), and Bill Woodcock (65 games), the very inexperienced team's remaining fifteen players had only played a total of 46 matches.
