= Peter Donnelly (Australian footballer) =

Australian rules footballer

Personal information
- Full name: Peter Daniel Donnelly
- Born: 19 February 1891; Collingwood, Victoria
- Died: 29 July 1957 (aged 66); Fairfield, Victoria
- Original team: Richmond Juniors

Playing career^{1}
Years	Club	Games (Goals)
1911	St Kilda	1 (0)
- ^{1} Playing statistics correct to the end of 1911.

Peter Daniel Donnelly (19 February 1891 – 29 July 1957) was an Australian rules footballer who played with St Kilda in the Victorian Football League (VFL).

== Football ==
One of nine new players in the team, Donnelly played his only First XVIII match for St Kilda against Carlton, at Princes park, on 29 July 1911. They were required because many of the regular St Kilda First XVIII players were on strike.

The other new players were: Alby Bowtell, Roy Cazaly, Claude Crowl, Alf Hammond, Otto O'Pelt, Rowley Smith, Tom Soutar, and Bill Ward — and, including that match, and ignoring Harrie Hattam (16 games), Bert Pierce (41 games), and Bill Woodcock (65 games), the very inexperienced team's remaining fifteen players had only played a total of 46 matches.
