= Bill Ward (footballer, born 1891) =

Australian rules footballer

Personal information
- Full name: William Henry Ward
- Born: 16 November 1891; Kew, Victoria
- Died: 21 February 1978 (aged 86); Camberwell, Victoria
- Original team: Glenhuntly

Playing career^{1}
Years	Club	Games (Goals)
1911	St Kilda	1 (0)
- ^{1} Playing statistics correct to the end of 1911.

William Henry Ward (16 November 1891 – 21 February 1978) was an Australian rules footballer who played with St Kilda in the Victorian Football League (VFL).

== Family ==
The son of William Mathew Ward (-1939), and Anne Ward, née Haines, William Henry Ward was born at Kew, Victoria on 16 November 1891.

He married Jennie May Foster in 1915.

== Football ==
One of nine new players in the team, Ward played his only First XVIII match for St Kilda against Carlton, at Princes park, on 29 July 1911. They were required because many of the regular St Kilda First XVIII players were on strike.

The other new players were: Alby Bowtell, Roy Cazaly, Claude Crowl, Peter Donnelly, Alf Hammond, Otto Opelt, Rowley Smith, and Tom Soutar — and, including that match, and ignoring Harrie Hattam (16 games), Bert Pierce (41 games), and Bill Woodcock (65 games), the very inexperienced team's remaining fifteen players had only played a total of 46 matches.

== Death ==
He died at Camberwell, Victoria on 21 February 1978.
