= Rowley Smith =

Australian rules footballer

Personal information
- Full name: John Rowland Smith
- Born: 18 June 1891; Carlton North, Victoria
- Died: 17 April 1958 (aged 66); Heidelberg, Victoria
- Original team: Caulfield (FFA)

Playing career^{1}
Years	Club	Games (Goals)
1911	St Kilda	3 (0)
- ^{1} Playing statistics correct to the end of 1911.

John Rowland Smith (18 June 1891 – 17 April 1958) was an Australian rules footballer who played with St Kilda in the Victorian Football League (VFL).

== Football ==
One of nine new players in the team, Smith made his debut for St Kilda against Carlton, at Princes park, on 29 July 1911. They were required because many of the regular St Kilda First XVIII players were on strike.

The other new players were: Alby Bowtell, Roy Cazaly, Claude Crowl, Peter Donnelly, Alf Hammond, Otto Opelt, Tom Soutar, and Bill Ward — and, including that match, and ignoring Harrie Hattam (16 games), Bert Pierce (41 games), and Bill Woodcock (65 games), the very inexperienced team's remaining fifteen players had only played a total of 46 matches.
