= Tom Soutar =

Personal information
- Full name: Thomas William Soutar
- Born: 16 March 1893; Prahran, Victoria
- Died: 14 June 1981 (aged 88); Western Australia
- Original team: South Yarra

Playing career^{1}
Years	Club	Games (Goals)
1911	St Kilda	1 (0)
- ^{1} Playing statistics correct to the end of 1911.

Thomas William Soutar (16 March 1893 – 14 June 1981) was a professional athlete and an Australian rules footballer who played with St Kilda in the Victorian Football League (VFL).

== Family ==
The son of Thomas Soutar, and Margaret Soutar, née Dunne, Thomas William Soutar was born at Prahran on 16 March 1893.

He married Vera Grace Veale (1896-1988), at Subiaco, on 24 November 1923. They had two children, Douglas William Soutar (b.1924), and Mavis Vera Soutar (b.1926).

== Athlete ==
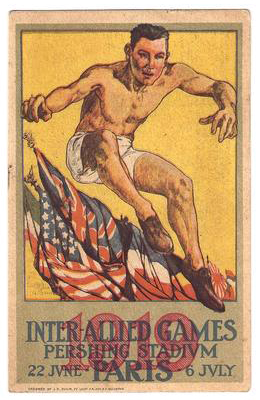
The Inter-Allied Games 1919

He was a fine middle-distance runner. winning the professional mile handicap at the 1914 Easter Gift Meeting at Stawell; and, during his service with the First AIF, on the basis of having won both the 880 yards and the mile at the Egyptian Expeditionary Force's 1919 Sports in Cairo, he was selected to be part of the team that represented Australia in the Inter-Allied Games, held at the Pershing Stadium, near Paris from 22 June 1919 to 6 July 1919.

"In army sports there is no distinction between amateur and professional ... During the latter part of the war in 27 championship brigade and divisional events over 440 yards, 880 yards and one mile, Soutar was never beaten ..." — The (Perth) Mirror, 16 November 1935.

== Football ==
One of nine new players in the team, Soutar played his only First XVIII match for St Kilda against Carlton, at Princes park, on 29 July 1911. They were required because many of the regular St Kilda First XVIII players were on strike.

The other new players were: Alby Bowtell, Roy Cazaly, Claude Crowl, Peter Donnelly, Alf Hammond, Otto Opelt, Rowley Smith, and Bill Ward — and, including that match, and ignoring Harrie Hattam (16 games), Bert Pierce (41 games), and Bill Woodcock (65 games), the very inexperienced team's remaining fifteen players had only played a total of 46 matches.

He trained with Melbourne in the 1920 pre-season, but did not play with them.

He played with West Perth in 1920 on his return to Australia from his overseas service in the First AIF.

== Military service ==
He enlisted in the First AIF at Perth, Western Australia on 9 March 1915; and, leaving Fremantle, Western Australia on 2 September 1915 on HMAT Anchises (A68), and served overseas with the 10th Light Horse Regiment.

His post-war repatriation to Australia was delayed when, as part of the A.I.F. Educational Scheme, he attended a course in bookkeeping at Clark's College, in Chancellery Lane, London in September/October 1919. He returned to Australia on the HT Konigin Luise, leaving England on 19 December 1919, arriving in Fremantle on 20 January 1920, and was discharged from the AIF on 30 March 1920.

== Death ==
He died, in Western Australia, on 14 June 1981, and has a memorial plaque at Karrakatta Cemetery.
