= Alby Bowtell =

Australian rules footballer

Personal information
- Full name: Albert Henry Bowtell
- Born: 27 June 1887; Collingwood, Victoria
- Died: 11 July 1948 (aged 61); Preston, Victoria
- Original team: Albert Park

Playing career^{1}
Years	Club	Games (Goals)
1911	St Kilda	1 (0)
- ^{1} Playing statistics correct to the end of 1911.

Albert Henry Bowtell (27 June 1887 – 11 July 1948) was an Australian rules footballer who played for the St Kilda Football Club in the Victorian Football League (VFL).

== Family ==
The son of David Walmsley Bowtell, and Mary Ann Bowtell, née Davies, Albert Henry Bowtell was born in Collingwood on 27 June 1887.

He married Ethel May Harcombe (1888-1920) on 18 January 1911. His second wife was Alexandrina Victoria Clark (1887-1973), née Patten.

== Football ==
One of nine new players in the team, Bowtell played his only First XVIII match for St Kilda against Carlton, at Princes park, on 29 July 1911.

The other new players were: Roy Cazaly, Claude Crowl, Peter Donnelly, Alf Hammond, Otto Opelt, Rowley Smith, Tom Soutar, and Bill Ward — and, including that match, and ignoring Harrie Hattam (16 games), Bert Pierce (41 games), and Bill Woodcock (65 games), the very inexperienced team's remaining fifteen players had only played a total of 46 matches.

== Death ==
He died at his Preston residence on 11 July 1948.
