= Roy Cazaly =

Australian rules footballer (1893–1963)

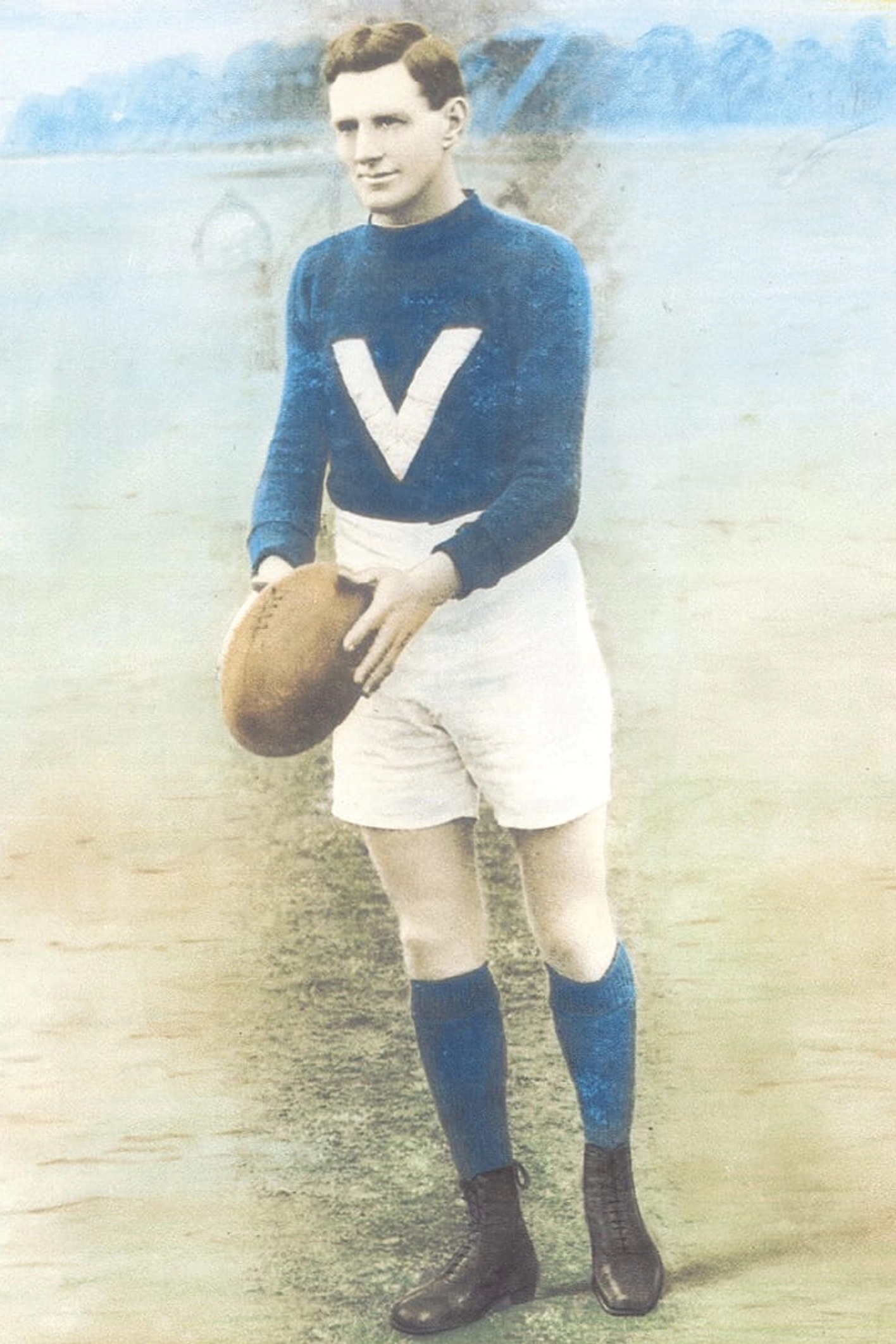
- Cazaly representing Victoria in 1924

Personal information
- Full name: Roy Cazaly
- Nickname: Cazza
- Born: 13 January 1893; Albert Park, Victoria, Australia
- Died: 10 October 1963 (aged 70); Lenah Valley, Tasmania, Australia
- Original team: Middle Park
- Height: 180 cm (5 ft 11 in)
- Weight: 80 kg (176 lb)
- Position: Ruckman

Playing career^{1}
Years	Club	Games (Goals)
1911–20	St Kilda	99 (38)
1921–24, 1926–27	South Melbourne	99 (129)
1925	Minyip	? (?)
Total		198 (167)

Representative team honours
Years	Team	Games (Goals)
	Victoria	13 (?)
	Tasmania	5 (?)

Coaching career^{3}
Years	Club	Games (W–L–D)
1922, 1937–38	South Melbourne	52 (12–38–2)
1942–43	Hawthorn	30 (10–20–0)
1928–30	City (NTFA)	54 (25–27–2)
1932–33	North Hobart	37 (25–12)
1934–36, 1948–51	New Town	130 (72–56–2)
1941	Camberwell	?
Total		303 (144–153–6)
- ^{1} Playing statistics correct to the end of 1927.^{3} Coaching statistics correct as of 1943.

Career highlights
- Australian National Football Carnival Championship: 1924; St Kilda Best and Fairest: 1918; St Kilda Captain: 1920; South Melbourne Most Consistent Player: 1926; Australian Football Hall of Fame – Legend Status; Tasmanian Football Hall of Fame

Roy Cazaly (13 January 1893 – 10 October 1963) was an Australian rules footballer who played for South Melbourne and St Kilda in the Victorian Football League (VFL). He also represented Victoria and Tasmania in interstate football and, after his retirement as a player, turned to coaching.

Known for his ruck work and high-flying marks, he inspired the common catchphrase "Up there, Cazaly!" which, in 1979, became the title of a popular song, securing his place in Australian folklore.

Cazaly was one of 12 inaugural "Legends" inducted into the Australian Football Hall of Fame.

== Family ==
Cazaly was born in Albert Park, a suburb of Melbourne, on 13 January 1893. He was the tenth child of English-born James Cazaly and his wife Elizabeth Jemima (née McNee). James Cazaly was a renowned sculler and rower in Melbourne. Just before 6 July 1878 he was eliminated in a semi-final for the sculling championship of Victoria by the eventual victor, Charles A. Messenger. Elizabeth was a midwife and herbalist from Scotland.

== Football ==
Cazaly learnt his football at the local state school, quickly becoming its first-choice ruckman. He tried out for VFL side Carlton Football Club in 1910, but quit the club when he injured a shoulder in a reserves match and could not get the Carlton medical staff to treat it.

=== St Kilda ===
Cazaly crossed to rival VFL side St Kilda and made his senior debut in 1911 during a players' strike, when many of St Kilda's regular senior players refused to play as a result of a dispute with the club's committee over dressing rooms.

One of nine new players in the team, Cazaly played his only First XVIII match for St Kilda against Carlton, at Princes Park, on 29 July 1911.

The other new players were: Alby Bowtell, Claude Crowl, Peter Donnelly, Alf Hammond, Otto Opelt, Rowley Smith, Tom Soutar, and Bill Ward – and, including that match, and ignoring Harrie Hattam (16 games), Bert Pierce (41 games), and Bill Woodcock (65 games), the very inexperienced team's remaining fifteen players had only played a total of 46 matches.

Cazaly played 99 matches with St Kilda.

=== South Melbourne ===
In 1920, he left St Kilda, signing with South Melbourne. He coached that club in 1922, and won South's most consistent player award in 1926.

During the depression of the early 1930s, he worked on the Melbourne waterfront and played with waterside workers in a midweek football competition.

=== South Warrnambool ===
Cazaly coached South Warrnambool during the 1919, 1920 and 1921 finals series and when they won the 1921 Warrnambool & District Football Association premiership.

Cazaly was responsible for recruiting South Warrnambool footballer and 1925 Brownlow Medallist, Colin Watson to St Kilda in 1920.

=== Minyip ===
Cazaly was captain-coach of Minyip in the Wimmera District Football League in 1925 at a salary of £12 a week. Cazaly returned to South Melbourne for the 1926 VFL season.

=== VFL fame ===
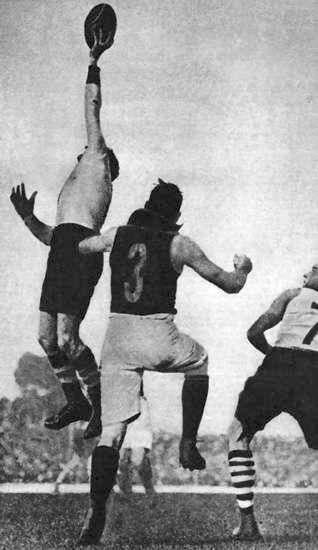
Cazaly taking a one-handed mark during the 1920s

Cazaly was 180 centimetres (5 ft 11 in) tall, which is short for a ruckman, but his high leap made up for that, and he was incredibly fit.

He was famous for his ability to take spectacular marks despite his relatively small stature, and South Melbourne teammates Fred "Skeeter" Fleiter and Mark "Napper" Tandy would simultaneously yell "Up there, Cazzer", originating the phrase that would become synonymous with Australian rules football. He initially developed his marking ability by jumping at a ball strung up in a shed at his home, and held his breath as he jumped, an action that he believed lifted him higher. He also possessed the capacity to kick a football over 65 metres. In 2009, The Australian nominated Cazaly as one of the 25 greatest footballers never to win the Brownlow Medal.

=== Post-VFL and coaching career ===
In 1928, Cazaly played for the South Melbourne Districts Football Club, including in a losing VFL Sub-Districts grand final in 1928.

He departed Victoria at the end of the year and headed for Launceston, Tasmania, before returning in 1931 to coach Preston in the Victorian Football Association (VFA).

His subsequent return to Tasmania was punctuated by stints as non-playing coach of South Melbourne in 1937 and 1938, and coach of Camberwell. In 1941, at the age of 48, he was nominally their non-playing coach, but did don a guernsey for a few games late in the season. He was non-playing coach of Hawthorn in 1942 and 1943, and non-playing assistant coach of South Melbourne in 1947.

While coaching Hawthorn, he was reported to have given the club its nickname the "Hawks", because he saw it as providing a tougher image than their original nickname, the "Mayblooms".

== Legacy ==
Cazaly is known to have played 322 premiership matches (198 in the VFL and 124 in the Tasmanian leagues), and 354 total career senior games (including 14 intrastate matches for the NTFA in Tasmania, and 18 interstate matches, 13 for Victoria and five for Tasmania). If his matches for Preston and Camberwell in the VFA are included, then Cazaly played in 343 premiership matches and 375 career senior games. Cazaly also played country football for Minyip in 1925, and in a mid-week football competition during the 1930s.

Cazaly retired from competitive football in 1941 at the age of 48. Later, he coached (non-playing) New Town to a number of Tasmanian Football League premierships.

The famous cry "Up there, Cazaly" was used as a battle cry by Australian forces during World War II. It is also the title of a famous song, released in 1979 by Mike Brady and the Two-Man Band.

After his retirement from football, Cazaly was involved in many business ventures. In later years he ran a successful physiotherapy business in Hobart which, in the years before his death, was managed by his son, also called Roy. Roy junior played for Sydney Naval Redlegs in 1945, and Newtown after the Second World War, in the NSWANFL. Cazaly senior, known for his extraordinary fitness well into his later years, although he was in ill-health in the five years before his death on 10 October 1963, at the age of seventy, in Lenah Valley, a suburb of Hobart.

Cazaly was inducted into the Australian Football Hall of Fame in 1996 as one of the inaugural twelve Legends. In 2003, Cazalys Stadium in Cairns, Queensland, was named after him.
