= Harry Cordner =

Australian rules footballer

Personal information
- Full name: Henry Cordner
- Born: 17 June 1885; Bendigo, Victoria
- Died: 14 November 1943 (aged 58); Hobart
- Original team: Melbourne Grammar
- Height: 6 ft (183 cm)
- Weight: 12 st 5 lb (173 lb; 78 kg)
- Position: centre

Playing career^{1}
Years	Club	Games (Goals)
1903–05	Melbourne	11 (16)
1908–09	University	29 (7)
Total		40 (23)
- ^{1} Playing statistics correct to the end of 1909.

Henry Cordner (17 June 1885 – 14 November 1943) was an Australian rules footballer who played with both the Melbourne Football Club and the Melbourne University Football Club in the Victorian Football League (VFL).

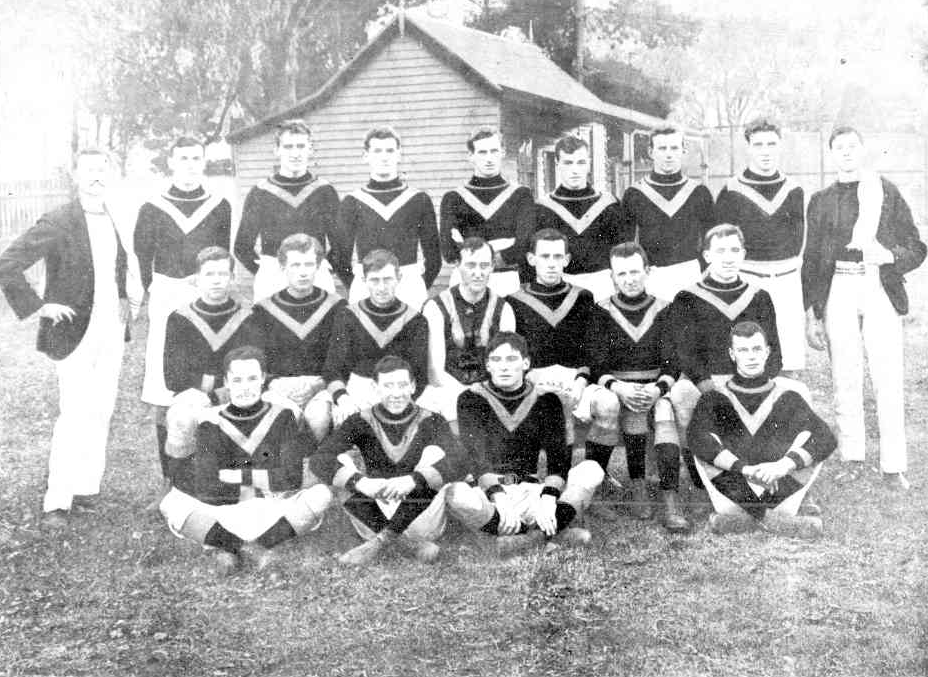
University VFL Team: 23 May 1908: H. Cordner, third from right, middle row.

== Family ==
The son of Edward James Cordner, and Helen Cordner, née Rae, Henry Cordner was born in Bendigo on 17 June 1885. He died in Hobart on 14 November 1943.

Harry's brother Ted Cordner, and his cousins Alan Cordner and "Larry" Cordner, also played senior VFL football. Harry is the uncle of the Cordners – Don, Denis, Ted and John – who played for Melbourne in the 1940s.

== Education ==
Henry entered into residence at Trinity College, Melbourne in 1904, graduating with a M.B., Ch.B. from the University of Melbourne in 1909.

== Football ==
He played VFL football for both Melbourne and University.

== Military service ==
Overseas at the time that war broke out, Dr. Henry Cordner was commissioned as a lieutenant in the Royal Army Medical Corps, on 16 August 1914, promoted to captain on 16 August 1916, and served in France.

== See also ==
- List of Australian rules football families
