= Alan Cordner =

Australian rules footballer (1890–1915)

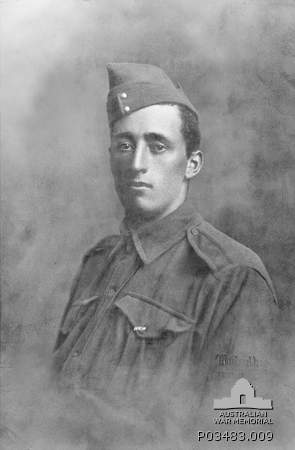
- Private J.A. Cordner (from a Red Cross file)

Personal information
- Full name: Joseph Alan Cordner
- Born: 6 May 1890; Bridgewater On Loddon
- Died: 25 April 1915 (aged 24) near Cape Helles, Gallipoli, Ottoman Turkey
- Original team: Hamilton
- Height: 183 cm (6 ft 0 in)
- Weight: 80 kg (176 lb)

Playing career^{1}
Years	Club	Games (Goals)
1911–1912	Geelong	3 (0)
1913–1914	Collingwood	20 (2)
Total		23 (2)
- ^{1} Playing statistics correct to the end of 1914.

Joseph Alan Cordner (6 May 1890 – 25 April 1915) was an Australian rules footballer who played for the Geelong Football Club and Collingwood Football Club in the Victorian Football League (VFL).

He was killed at Cape Helles in Ottoman Turkey during the initial invasion of the Gallipoli peninsula by the forces of the First AIF (Australian Imperial Force) on 25 April 1915.

== Family ==
The son of Isaiah Joseph Cordner (1860–1934), a bank manager, and Jessie Cordner (1865–1901), née Walker, he was born on 6 May 1890 at Bridgewater On Loddon, Victoria. His father remarried, marrying Mabel Emilie McKay (1860–1969) in 1902. He had one full brother, Edward Clement Cordner (1892–1943), three half-brothers and one half-sister.

Cordner attended the Hamilton and Western District Boys' College from 1902 to 1906, and was a prefect in 1905 and school captain in 1906.

== Footballer ==
As a schoolboy Cordner was renowned for his long drop-kicks and strong marks.

Recruited from Warrnambool, Cordner played his first senior VFL match, aged 21, for Geelong, against Carlton, at Princes Park, on Saturday, 19 August 1911 (round sixteen). He was given the single game to gauge his prospects for the 1912 season; he played well for Geelong in a high standard match, which Carlton won in the last quarter.

Although Cordner played well in Geelong's first match of the season, he was not selected again until the match against University on 8 June 1912 (round eight). On a very windy day, with a bad football (it had been over-inflated), and in a very low standard game, which Geelong eventually won by 37 points, 8.15 (63) to 3.8 (26), he was not amongst Geelong's best players.

Cleared from Geelong to Collingwood on 9 April 1913, he played his first senior game for Collingwood, at Victoria Park, against Carlton, on 17 May 1913 (round four); he played well, in the backline, in a Collingwood team that won a hard-fought match by six points. In 1913 he played ten senior games (of a possible nineteen) for Collingwood, including its Semi-Final 37-point loss to Fitzroy on 13 September 1913. He injured his collar-bone during the match, which was played in the rain, on a very wet and muddy ground. He remained on the field of play once injured, but was of little use.

Cordner's half brother Laurence Osmaston "Larry" Cordner (1911–1992), and two of his cousins, Dr. Henry "Harry" Cordner (1885–1943) and Dr. Edward Rae "Ted" Cordner (1887–1963), also played senior VFL football. Dr "Ted" was the father of the Don Cordner, Denis Cordner, Ted Cordner and John Cordner who all played for Melbourne in the 1940s.

== Soldier ==
Cordner was working as a clerk when he enlisted in Melbourne on 22 August 1914; it was the same day that he played his last match for Collingwood. He was the first Collingwood footballer to enlist. He served as a private in B Company of the 6th Battalion, First AIF, and embarked on 19 October 1914, aboard HMAT Hororata, for service overseas.

His brother, Sergeant Edward Clement Cordner (Service number 89), enlisted on 18 May 1914, serving in the 13th Light Horse Regiment. His cousin, Captain Edward Rae "Ted" Cordner, served as a medical officer in the 6th Field Ambulance. His other cousin, Dr. Henry "Harry" Cordner, overseas at the time that war broke out, was commissioned as an officer in the Royal Army Medical Corps, and served in France.

== Death ==
Cordner died on 25 April 1915, shot some four miles inland, after being cut off by the Turks and becoming separated from his Battalion at Cape Helles, the rocky headland at the southwesternmost tip of the Gallipoli peninsula.

His body was never recovered. He was initially posted as "wounded" (in April 1915); following a fruitless search of the relevant hospitals, he was posted as "wounded and missing" (in October 1915). He was not officially declared to have been "killed in action" until after some twelve months of investigation had been conducted by the Red Cross.

In an apparent act of kindness, the final declaration of his death was conveyed to his mother and father by the Reverend Thomas Pearse Bennett, the vicar of Christ Church, Warrnambool. Pearse, who was also an Anglican military chaplain, had received the news by wire that Cordner had been declared "killed in action", along with "expressions of sympathy with the deceased's parents from the King and Government", and took the news immediately to Cordner's parents at the Warrnambool National Bank.

== Remembered ==
He is commemorated at the Lone Pine Memorial, on the Gallipoli Peninsula; his name is located at panel 46 in the Commemorative Area of the Australian War Memorial.

== See also ==
- List of Australian military personnel killed at Anzac Cove on 25 April 1915
- List of Victorian Football League players who died on active service
- List of Australian rules football families

== Sources ==
- Holmesby, Russell & Main, Jim (2007). The Encyclopedia of AFL Footballers. 7th ed. Melbourne: Bas Publishing.
- Main, J. & Allen, D., "Cordner, Alan", pp. 44–46 in Main, J. & Allen, D., Fallen – The Ultimate Heroes: Footballers Who Never Returned From War, Crown Content, (Melbourne), 2002.
- Personal: Dr. Henry Cordner, The Argus, (Saturday, 29 August 1914), p. 17.
- Personal, Warrnambool Standard, (Tuesday, 8 September 1914), p. 2.
- Australian Casualties: 97th List Issued: Wounded: Victoria ("Pte. J. A. Cordner, 6th Batt., Warrnambool"), The Argus, (Monday 25 October 1915), p. 5.
- The Roll of Honour: Two Further Lists of Casualties (102nd and 103rd Lists): Victoria: Wounded ("Pte. J. A. Cordner, 6th Btn. (and missing)"), The Brisbane Courier, (Tuesday, 2 November 1915), p. 4.
- Collingwood Club, The Argus, (Thursday 2 March 1916), p. 6.
- Personal, Warrnambol Standard, (Saturday 3 June 1916), p. 3.
- Australian Casualties: 175th List: Killed in Action: Victoria ("Pvt. J. A. Cordner, Warrnambool, 25/4/15"), The Argus, (Monday 12 June 1916), p. 5: (Note: 13½ months after he was, at least, "missing").
