= Rupert Balfe =

Australian rules footballer

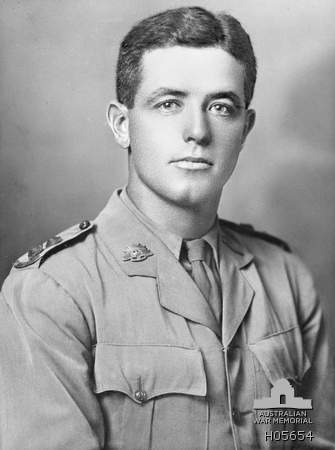

Personal information
- Full name: Joseph Rupert Balfe
- Born: 9 March 1890; Brunswick, Victoria, Australia
- Died: 25 April 1915 (aged 25); Anzac Cove, Gallipoli, Ottoman Turkey
- Original team: Brunswick (VFA)
- Debut: 15 May 1909, University vs. St Kilda, at Junction Oval

Playing career^{1}
Years	Club	Games (Goals)
1909, 1911	University	7 (2)
- ^{1} Playing statistics correct to the end of 1911.

Joseph Rupert Balfe (9 March 1890 – 25 April 1915) was an Australian rules footballer and soldier who was killed during the landing at Anzac Cove. (Note: Despite various suggestions given over time, related to particular individuals, it is clear that because at least six former VFL footballers were killed during the chaos of the landing at Anzac Cove—Rupert Balfe (University), Alan Cordner (Geelong and Collingwood), Claude Crowl (St Kilda), Charlie Fincher (South Melbourne), Fen McDonald (Carlton and Melbourne), and Joe Pearce (Melbourne)—it can never be definitively argued that one of these men was "the first VFL footballer killed in the First World War".)

== Early life and education ==
The son of Matthew Balfe (later mayor of Brunswick) and Sarah Knott, Rupert Balfe was born in Brunswick in 1890. Balfe attended Princes Hill State School before earning a scholarship to attend Thomas Palmer's University High School, in Grattan Street, Carlton.

After completing his secondary education in 1908, he studied medicine at the University of Melbourne and was in his final year when he enlisted to serve in World War I.

== The true athlete ==
Balfe played football for Brunswick whilst starring in athletics at University High. He played in the 1908 VFA Grand Final for Brunswick against Footscray, along with his two brothers, Harold (whose arm was broken) and Stan. When at Melbourne University, he played for the VFL side University, but due to his studies he played a limited number of games. He played one game in the 1909 season and 6 more games during the 1911 season.

Balfe was a notable athlete, especially in field athletics. He was a state High School champion in athletics, winning the 100, 200 and 440 yards, long jump, high jump and 120 yards hurdles. In 1913 he was runner-up in the long jump at the Victorian athletic championships.

== World War I ==
Balfe enlisted on 2 September 1914 as a Second Lieutenant with the 6th Battalion in the First Australian Imperial Force (AIF). He was killed by a bursting shell whilst landing at Gallipoli, Ottoman Turkey, at the age of 25. He was one of many players from the VFL during World War I who lost their lives.

== Friendship with Menzies ==
Balfe had a strong friendship with Robert Menzies, who was studying law at Melbourne University. Menzies went on to become the Prime Minister of Australia from 1939 to 1941, 1949–1966. Menzies wrote a poem for the late Balfe which appeared in several local newspapers on 16 July 1915.

In Memoriam Lieut. J. R. Balfe, Killed in Action, Gallipoli, July 1915

His was the call that came from far away –
An Empire's message flashing o'er the sea –
The call to arms! The blood of chivalry
Pulsed quicker in his veins; he could not stay!
Let others wait; for him the glorious day
Of tyrants humbled and a world set free
Had dawned in clouds and thunder; with a glee
Born not of insensate madness for the fray,
But rather of a spirit noble, brave,
And kindled by a heart that wept at wrong,
He went. The storms of battle round him rave
And screaming fury o'er him chants its song,
Sleep, gallant soul! Though gone thy living breath,
Thou liv'st for aye, for thou has conquered death!"

== See also ==
- List of Australian military personnel killed at Anzac Cove on 25 April 1915
- List of Victorian Football League players who died on active service
