= John Cordner =

John Cordner may refer to:

- John Cordner (politician) (1816–1894), first Unitarian minister in Canada
- John Cordner (sportsman) (1929–2016), one of the Cordner brothers of the VFL
