= Claude Crowl =

Australian rules footballer (1892–1915)

Personal information
- Full name: Claude Terrell Crowl
- Born: 26 December 1892; Stratford
- Died: 25 April 1915 (aged 22); Anzac Cove, Gallipoli, Ottoman Turkey
- Original team: Caulfield Grammar

Playing career^{1}
Years	Club	Games (Goals)
1911	St Kilda	3 (0)
- ^{1} Playing statistics correct to the end of 1911.

Claude Terrell Crowl (26 December 1892 – 25 April 1915) was an Australian rules footballer who played with St Kilda in the Victorian Football League.

He was a member of the First AIF, and was killed in action during the landing at Anzac Cove, Gallipoli, in Ottoman Turkey on 25 April 1915.

== Family ==
The son of Richard Terrell Crowl (1851–1923) and Jane Crowl (1851–1918), née Brown, he was born at Stratford, Victoria on 26 December 1892.

He was the cousin of the Geelong footballer Captain Joseph Terrell Crowl who was killed in action at Gallipoli on 27 June 1915.

== Athlete ==
He attended Caulfield Grammar School from 1903 to 1905; and, whilst there, he was an outstanding performer in under-age athletics.

At the 1905 Caulfield Grammar School Sports, held on 27 October, he was declared the under-14 champion, having won the 100 yards and 220 yards, and come second in the 440 yards. He was awarded the "Under 14 Cup" having beaten another student, equal on points, in a "run off". Running for the school, he came third in the under-14 100 yards race in the Fourth Annual Victorian School Athletic Championships two weeks later.

== Footballer ==
Although he had been training with Carlton, he played his first senior game for St Kilda, aged 18, against Carlton, at Princes Park on Saturday, 29 July 1911 (round fifteen).

He was one of nine men who took the field for St Kilda for the first time on that day. The nine were Alby Bowtell, Roy Cazaly, Crowl, Peter Donnelly, Alf Hammond, Otto Opelt, Rowley Smith, Tom Soutar, and Bill Ward – and, including that match, and ignoring Harrie Hattam (16 games), Bert Pierce (41 games), and Bill Woodcock (65 games), the very inexperienced team's remaining fifteen players had only played a total of 46 matches. They were required because many of the regular St Kilda First XVIII players were on strike.

The fact that Crowl played the last of his three senior games in round seventeen, is simply explained: the strike was resolved before round eighteen, and the only player of the nine to keep his place was Cazaly. Crowl played well in his first match in the back pocket of a team that was thrashed by 114 points, 18.21 (129) to 2.3 (15).

He played the next match, against Essendon, also in the back pocket; St Kilda lost by 125 points, 24.19 (163) to 5.8 (38).

In the last of his three senior matches, in round seventeen, against Richmond, he played at centre half-forward. It is not clear whether the selectors thought that his presence would strengthen the forward line, or that his absence would make the back-line less vulnerable; regardless, Richmond won by 87 points, 17.21 (123) to 5.6 (36).

== Soldier ==
He enlisted in the First AIF on 25 August 1914, giving his occupation as a farmer at Poowong, Victoria.

== Died ==
A Private in the 8th Battalion, First AIF, he died in action whilst landing at Gallipoli on 25 April 1915.

Fen McDonald who had played his first game for Carlton on the same day that Crowl made his debut for St Kilda, also died in action at Gallipoli on 25 April 1915. A special medal named in honour of both men was awarded to the best player on the ground in the match played between St Kilda and Carlton on the hundredth anniversary of the Gallipoli landings.

== Remembered ==
His name appeared on an honour roll at Caulfield Grammar School, and on the Lone Pine Memorial.

== See also ==
- List of Australian military personnel killed at Anzac Cove on 25 April 1915
- List of Victorian Football League players who died on active service
- List of Caulfield Grammar School people
