= Edward Cordner =

Australian rules footballer

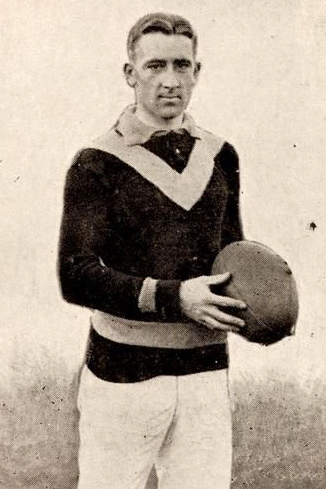
- Cordner in 1910

Personal information
- Full name: Edward Rae Cordner
- Born: 18 June 1887; Sandhurst, Victoria
- Died: 21 July 1963 (aged 76); Greensborough, Victoria
- Original team: Melbourne Grammar
- Position: Defender

Playing career^{1}
Years	Club	Games (Goals)
1905	Melbourne	2 (0)
1908–12	University	60 (8)
Total		62 (8)
- ^{1} Playing statistics correct to the end of 1912.

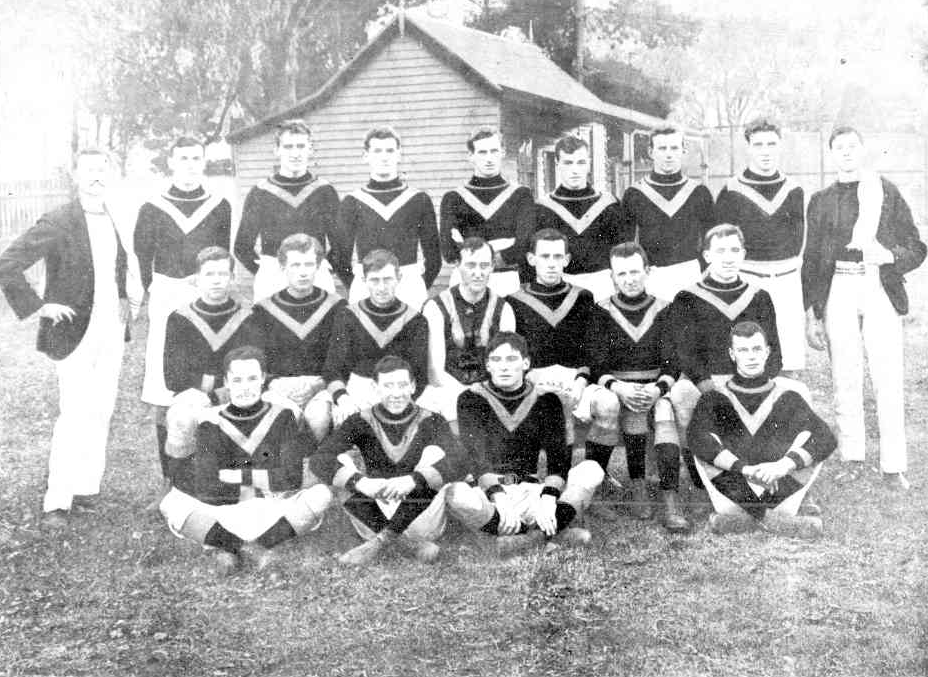
University VFL Team: 23 May 1908: E. Cordner, extreme right, middle row.

Edward Rae Cordner (18 June 1887 – 21 July 1963) was an Australian rules footballer who played with Melbourne and University in the Victorian Football League (VFL).

== Family ==
The son of Edward James Cordner (1856–1930), and Helen Cordner (1860–1952), née Rae, Edward Rae Cordner was born at Sandhurst, now known as Bendigo, in Victoria on 18 June 1887.

Whilst serving in the First AIF, he married Margaret Constance Pruen, at Cheltenham, in England, on 23 January 1918. They had four sons, Edward Pruen Cordner (1919–1996), the 1946 Brownlow Medal winner Donald Pruen Cordner (1922–2009), George Denis Pruen Cordner (1924–1990), and John Pruen Cordner (1929–2016), all of whom represented Melbourne Grammar School, University Blacks, and Melbourne in Australian rules football.

Ted's brother Harry Cordner — "Harry" Cordner, who was overseas at the time that war broke out, was commissioned as an officer in the Royal Army Medical Corps, and served in France. — and two of his cousins Alan Cordner and "Larry" Cordner, also played senior VFL football.

== Education ==
Educated at Melbourne Grammar School, Ted entered into residence at Trinity College, Melbourne in 1906, and graduated M.B.B.S. from the University of Melbourne on 23 December 1910.

In 1910, he shared the prestigious Beaney Scholarship for Surgery, with his fellow Old Melburnian, University Football Club team-mate, and fellow medical student, Athol Tymms.

== Football ==
Ted played two senior VFL games with Melbourne in 1905, while still a pupil at Melbourne Grammar.

Admitted to Melbourne University in 1906, he played for the university team for two seasons (1906 and 1907) in the Metropolitan Junior Football Association (MJFA); and, then, when the university team was admitted to the VFL competition in 1908, he played another 60 VFL games for University over five seasons (1908 to 1912), as both a student and a graduate of the university. He left Australia for England in 1913 to advance his medical career, and did not play in the VFL ever again.

== Military service ==
Captain (later, Major) Edward Rae Cordner, served as a medical officer in the 6th Field Ambulance.

== Death ==
He died at the Diamond Valley Community Hospital in Greensborough on 21 July 1963.

== See also ==
- List of Australian rules football families
