= Thomas Baird (disambiguation) =

Thomas, Tom or Tommmy Baird may refer to:

- Thomas D. Baird (1819–1973), American educator
- Tom Baird (footballer) (1884–1939) Australian rules footballer
- Thomas Baird (born 1924), English Royal Navy officer
- Tom Baird (1885–1962), American baseball executive
- Tommy Baird (footballer, born 1911) (1911-1994) Scottish footballer, also known as Tam Baird, see List of Rochdale A.F.C. players (25–99 appearances)
