= William Sullivan Barnes =

William Sullivan Barnes (16 June 1841 – 2 April 1912) was born in Boston and became a Unitarian minister.

After working in the business world, Barnes studied at Newton Theological Seminary. After graduating, he was a practicing minister in various locations in Massachusetts before accepting a position with the Unitarians of Montreal to succeed John Cordner, a distinguished minister with an established congregation of many leading citizens. He soon became recognized as an outstanding orator.

The Barnes ministry was highly geared toward culture and the visual arts and for this he became famous, receiving an honorary LLD from McGill University in 1909.

He was seen as weak in the area of denominational promotion and the congregation diminished during his tenure.

== Family ==
Barnes married Mary Alice Turner in 1864; they had two daughters and two sons. Edith Westgate Barnes (1866-1867); Clara Lillian Barnes (1868 - ); Howard Turner Barnes (1873 - ) and Wilfred Molson Barnes (1882 - 1955)
