= Joe Crowl =

Australian rules footballer (1883–1915)

Personal information
- Full name: Joseph Terrell Crowl
- Born: 13 December 1883; Melbourne, Victoria
- Died: 27 June 1915 (aged 31); Gallipoli, Ottoman Turkey
- Original teams: Mercantile and Chilwell

Playing career^{1}
Years	Club	Games (Goals)
1906	Geelong	4 (0)
- ^{1} Playing statistics correct to the end of 1914.

Joseph Terrell Crowl (13 December 1883 – 27 June 1915) was an Australian rules footballer who played with Geelong in the Victorian Football League. He was killed soon after the landings in Gallipoli in World War I.

== Family ==
The son of Joseph Terrell Crowl (1856–1924), and Matilda Orr Crowl (1924), née Forbes, Joseph Terrell Crowl was born in Melbourne on 13 December 1883.

He was the cousin of the St Kilda footballer Private Claude Terrell Crowl (337) who was killed in action whilst landing at Gallipoli, Ottoman Turkey on 25 April 1915.

== See also ==
- List of Victorian Football League players who died on active service
