= William Henry Strahan =

Australian soldier, poet

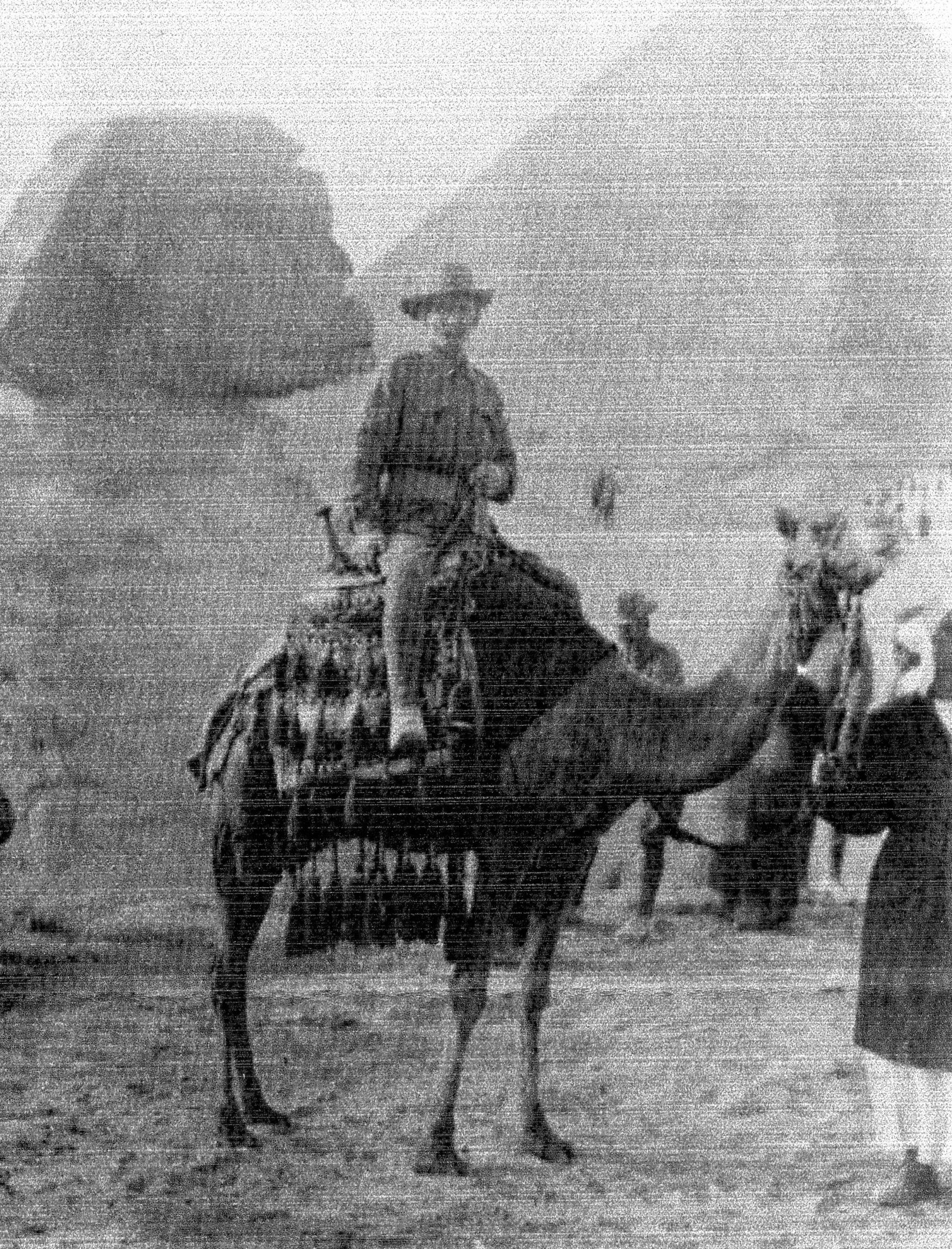
- Bill Strahan in Egypt 1915
- Born: 21 September 1869; Toodyay, Western Australia, Australia
- Died: 25 April 1915 (aged 45); Anzac Cove, Gallipoli Peninsula, Ottoman Turkey
- Military career
- Allegiance: Australia
- Branch: Citizen Military Forces; Australian Imperial Force
- Service years: c. 1900–1915
- Rank: Sergeant
- Nicknames: Bill, Will
- Unit: 16th Battalion
- Conflicts: First World War; Gallipoli campaign; Landing at Anzac Cove †

William Henry Strahan (21 September 1869 – 25 April 1915) was an Australian fruitgrower, soldier and poet. Before enlisting in the Australian Imperial Force (AIF), he was a member of the Toodyay Road Board in Western Australia and a volunteer member of the Australian Light Horse and Guildford Rifles, where he held the rank of sergeant major. He joined the AIF on the outbreak of the First World War and was a sergeant in the 16th Battalion when he was killed in action on 25 April 1915 following the landing at Anzac Cove.

Strahan wrote The Bugle Call, which was published several times after his death. The verses were sent to King George V, prompting the response from the palace that Strahan had "acted up ... to the spirit of his utterances".

== Personal life ==
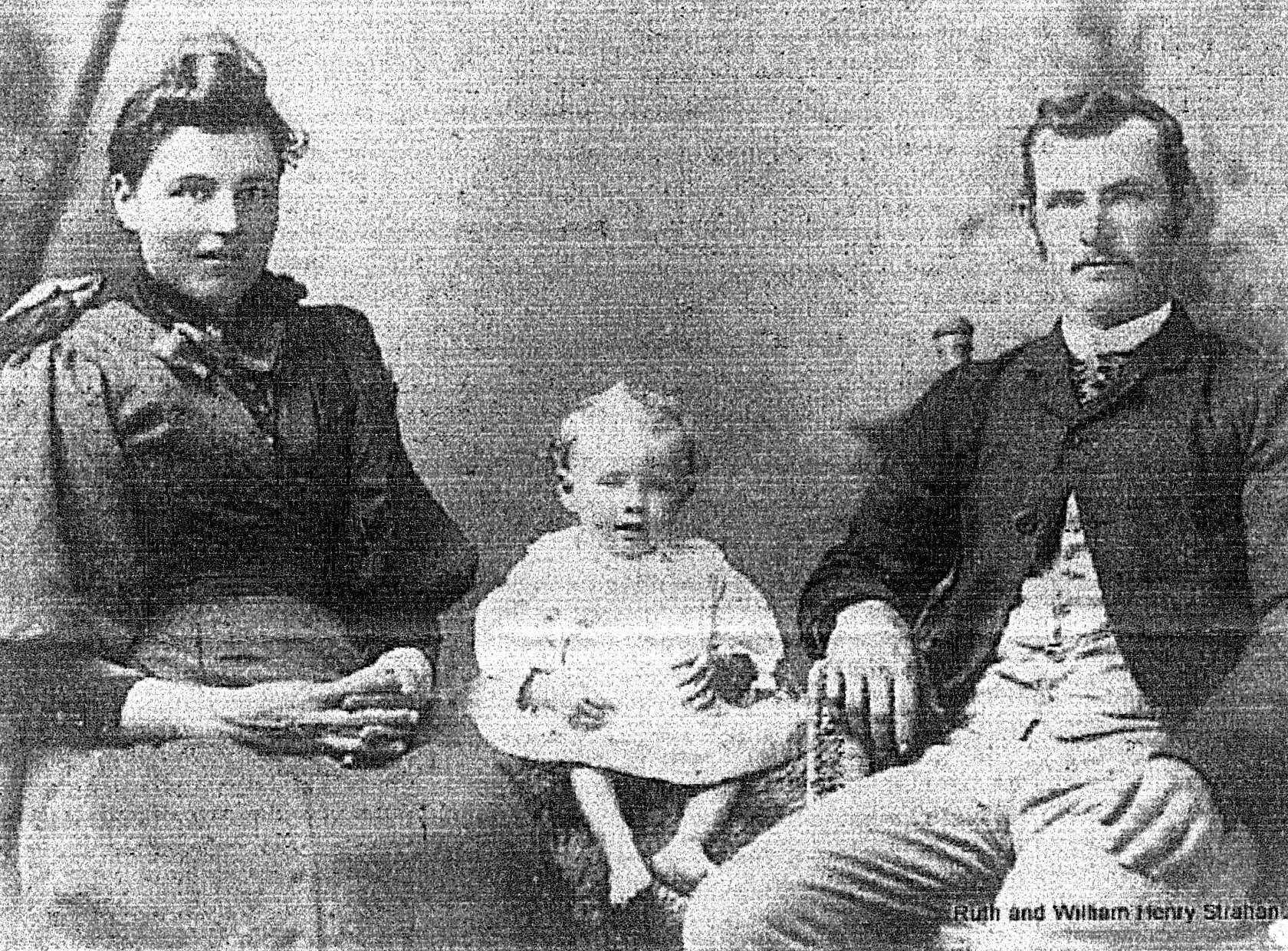
Ruth and Bill Strahan

Strahan was born on 21 September 1869, the son of James Strahan (1837–1918) and Susannah née Straghan (1841–1900), and grew up on the 100-acre (40 ha) farm and 25-acre (10 ha) family orchard in Toodyay. In 1895 he purchased the orchard from his father. Strahan married Ruth Ellen Monger (1872–1936) (the cousin of John Henry Monger) at St Stephen's Anglican Church, Toodyay on 25 April 1894. They had ten children: Olive Myrtle (1895), Herbert Elwell (1896), William (Jim) James (1898), Ruth Eileen (1900), Eric Forrest (1902), Gordon Phillip (1904), Byron Henry (1907), Margaret Esther (1909), Stephen Monger (1911) and Kelvin John (1913).

Strahan served on the Toodyay Road Board and was a member of the Deepdale Fruitgrowers Association. Strahan was noted for arguing his position to his own benefit but he would concede when there was benefit to the wider community. It was this character that not only made Strahan well respected in the community but also saw him become one of the first people to enlist for the First World War.

Strahan's son, Herbert Elwell (1896–1987), also fought in France with the 39th Battalion in the First World War.

== Military service ==
Around 1900 Strahan joined the Guildford Rifles and later the Australian Light Horse, where he rose to the rank of sergeant major. At the outbreak of the First World War, he resigned to enlist in the Australian Imperial Force. He joined A Company of the 16th Battalion on 14 September 1914, and on 1 October was promoted to sergeant. The initial training period of two months took place at Blackboy Hill in Western Australia. The army then decided that the 4th Brigade was to assemble at Broadmeadows, in Victoria, to complete its organisation and training before embarkation overseas. In November, therefore, all ranks were given leave and Strahan went back to Toodyay to visit family and friends. While there, he was given an official send off by the Toodyay Road Board. On 21 November, the battalion entrained for Fremantle and embarked in two parties on SS Indarra and Dimboola, which arrived at Port Melbourne about a week later. Each party was then transported to Broadmeadows. On 22 December Strahan, along with the 16th Battalion, embarked on troopship A40 Ceramic for Albany, Western Australia. They reached Albany on 28 December. No shore leave was granted. At 8am on 31 December Ceramic sailed from King George Sound in the second convoy of troops to leave Albany and arrived a month later in Egypt. After further training in Egypt, the 16th Battalion was part of the third wave of the landings at Gallipoli on the afternoon of 25 April 1915. Strahan was shot by a sniper and killed on that first day. He is memorialised at Lone Pine Cemetery at Gallipoli.

== The Bugle Call ==
On 4 September 1914, before departing for Blackboy Hill and joining the AIF, Strahan wrote The Bugle Call. After his death the lyrics were published in various papers. Major General Sir Harry Barron, the Governor of Western Australia, sent a copy of the lyrics to King George V, eliciting the response "Evidently the writer by his gallant deeds acted up not to the letter only, but to the spirit of his utterances".

Do you hear the Bugle calling, or are you deaf or blind or dumb?

Will you fight tor Flag, and Freedom, will you let the foeman come?
Will you halt, and look, and linger, will you fail your brothers now?
Or stand and fight and conquer 'neath Australia's wattle bough.

Do you hear the Bugle calling, call all men worth the name?
Will you share your Country's conflict, or hide your face in shame?
Do you hear the millions marching, 'gainst Belgium's glorious stand?
Will you lend a hand to conquer the spoilers of the land?
Do you hear the Bugle calling, calling loud, and long and shrill?
Help to stay the marching millions – there's a place that you can fill
Shall we, when History's written, like Belshazzar weighed of old
Be in the scales found wanting, our Empire to uphold.

Do you hear the Bugle calling, Come from your Farms afar;
If it's British blood that's in you, uphold our Nation's star
For tradition proudly tells us, while Britannia rules the waves
We're the British race of people – they can never make us slaves.
Do you hear the Bugle calling, don't let it call in vain?
Let your answer be 'we're coming' to our friends across the foam
For wife and child, and sweetheart and our sunny Austral home.

Do you hear the Bugle calling, do you see the foeman reel?
Gainst a line of gleaming bayonets like a glistening wall of steel
Hold the Forts, brave lads, 'We're coming' Australia's sons are true
We'll stand or fall together 'neath the Red, White and the Blue.

Do you hear the Bugle calling, we expect you to reply!
You will stake your life for freedom, you will do your best or die
And if perchance in action for you Country you should Fall
We will not forget your answer to that thrilling Bugle call.

Chorus
Australia's sons are coming, Britain never calls in vain.
Like our proud Canadian brothers
We are sons of British mothers –
That's our answer to our Foes across the Main.

== See also ==
- List of Australian military personnel killed at Anzac Cove on 25 April 1915
