= Athol Tymms =

Australian rules footballer, born 1886

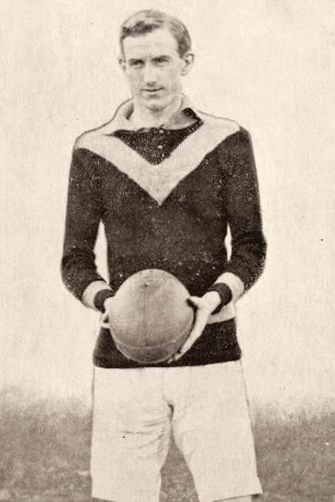
- Tymms in 1910

Personal information
- Full name: Athol Stanley Mortimer Tymms
- Born: 21 February 1886; Essendon, Victoria
- Died: 2 November 1949 (aged 63); Armadale, Victoria

Playing career^{1}
Years	Club	Games (Goals)
1905	Essendon	3 (1)
1908–1913	University	60 (29)
Total		63 (30)
- ^{1} Playing statistics correct to the end of 1913.

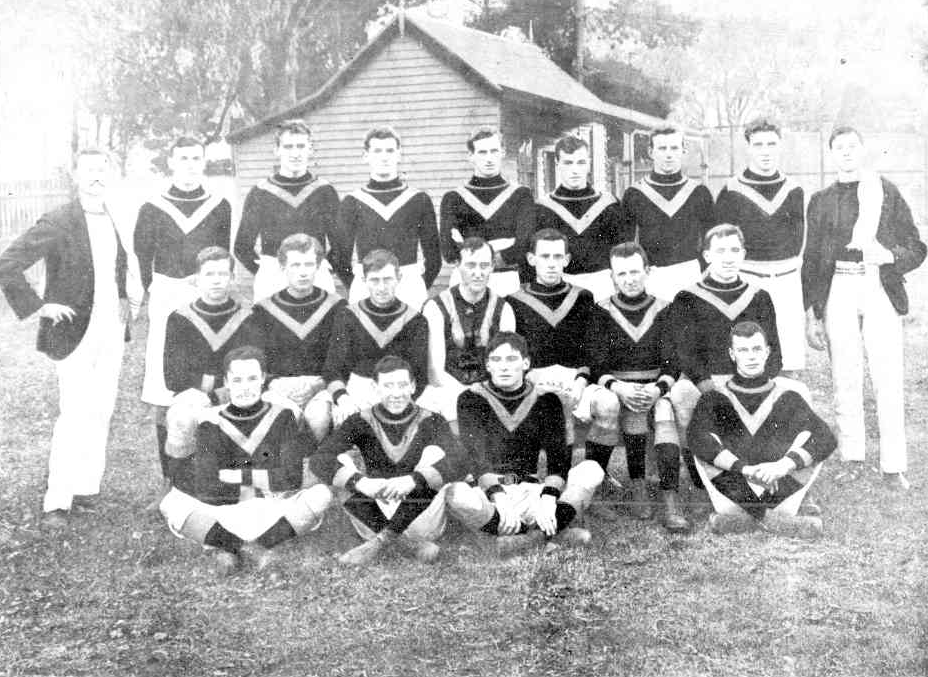
University VFL Team: 23 May 1908: A. Tymms, fourth player from left, back row.

Athol Stanley Mortimer Tymms (21 February 1886 – 2 November 1949) was an Australian rules footballer in the Victorian Football League (VFL).

== Family ==
The third son, and the eighth of the eleven children of English-born jeweller, Robert Joseph Tymms (1847–1930), and Canadian-born Anna Augusta Tymms (1849–1938), née Magee, Athol Stanley Mortimer Tymms was born at Essendon, Victoria on 21 February 1886.

=== Marriages ===
He married his first wife, Ethel Mary Ragg (1878–1936), at Sydney, on 17 December 1915; they had one child: Robert Dunlop Tymms (b. 30 May 1922).

He married his second wife, Alison Atkins Fletcher (1904–1998), at Deniliquin, New South Wales in 1937; they had two children: the twins, Athol Mortimer Tymms, and John Mortimer Tymms, both born on 1 August 1938.

== Education ==
Having been educated at Melbourne Grammar School from 1901 to 1904 — where he excelled as both an athlete and a footballer — Tymms went on to study medicine at the University of Melbourne.

- In 1910, he shared the prestigious Beaney Scholarship for Surgery with his fellow Old Melburnian, University Football Club team-mate, and fellow medical student, Edward Cordner.
- He was scheduled to graduate Bachelor of Medicine (MB) on 23 December 1910; however, he did not attend the graduation ceremony.
- He graduated Bachelor of Medicine and Bachelor of Surgery (MBBS) on 2 March 1911.
- He graduated Doctor of Medicine (MD) on 5 April 1913.
- He graduated Master of Surgery (MS) on 8 April 1916.

== Football ==
=== Essendon (VFL) ===
Born in Essendon, he debuted with the Essendon Football Club in 1905, and played in three senior games.

=== University (VFL) ===
After two seasons absence, he returned to the VFL with the University in 1908, the club's first season in the VFL competition, going on to play 60 games with University over six seasons (1908–1913).

== Medical career ==
After the 1913 season Tymms retired to focus on his career as a medical practitioner, and concentrate on his studies to become a specialist surgeon.

== Death ==
He died at his home in Armadale on 2 November 1949 at the age of 63.
