= Henry Merrett =

Australian rules footballer

Personal information
- Full name: Henry Frederick Merrett
- Born: 29 June 1886; Allendale, Victoria
- Died: 13 February 1954 (aged 67); Lyndhurst, Victoria
- Original team: Warburton

Playing career^{1}
Years	Club	Games (Goals)
1911	St Kilda	3 (0)
- ^{1} Playing statistics correct to the end of 1911.

Henry Frederick Merrett (29 June 1886 – 13 February 1954) was an Australian rules footballer who played with St Kilda in the Victorian Football League (VFL).

== Family ==
The son of Thomas Henry Merrett (1834-1907), and Hannah Maria Merrett (1845-1919), née Polley, Henry Frederick Merrett was born at Allendale, Victoria on 29 June 1886.

He married Eva Ruby Williams (1889-1958) in 1907. They had two children, Bruce (b.1909), and Olga (b.1910).

== Football ==
"H. Merrett, a tall forward and follower from Warburton", made his debut for St Kilda, against Collingwood, at Victoria Park, on 17 June 1911. He played in two more senior matches: against Melbourne, at the Junction Oval on 22 July 1911, and against Richmond, at the Punt Road Oval, on 26 August 1911.

== Death ==
He died on 13 February 1954.
