= St Stephen's Anglican Church, Toodyay =

Church building in Western Australia, Australia

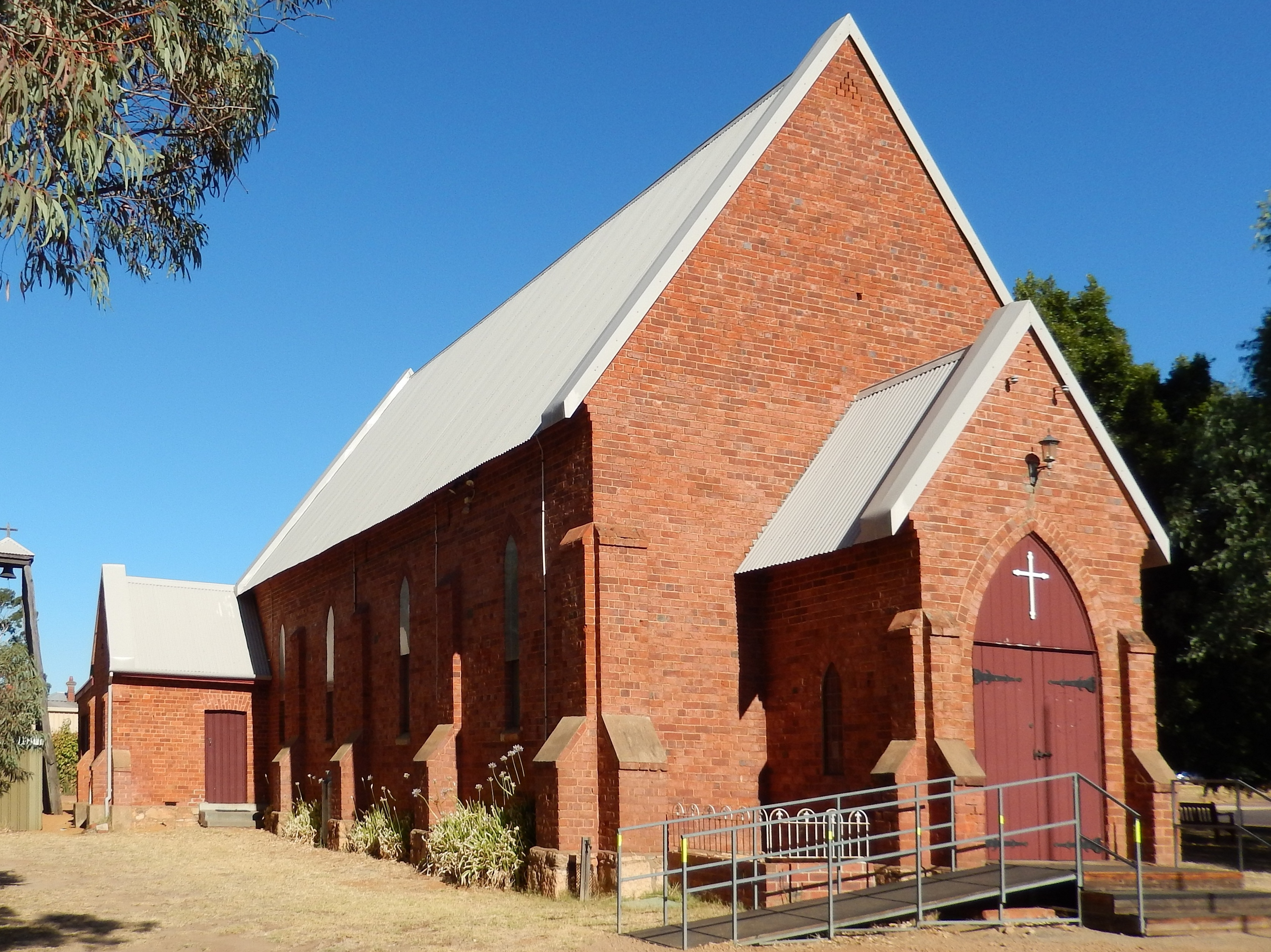
- The church in 2014
- St Stephen's Anglican Church, Toodyay
- 31°33′0″S 116°27′55″E
- Location: 132 Stirling Terrace, Toodyay, Western Australia
- Country: Australia
- Denomination: Anglican
- Website: St Stephen, Toodyay

History
- Status: Church
- Founded: 1861
- Dedication: St Stephen
- Consecrated: 1862

Architecture
- Functional status: Active
- Architect: F.G.B. Hawkins (1948)
- Style: Victorian Gothic
- Years built: 1861–62, extended 1948

Specifications
- Materials: Brick, corrugated iron

Administration
- Province: Western Australia
- Diocese: Perth
- Parish: Toodyay-Goomalling

Western Australia Heritage Register
- Official name: St Stephen's Church of England (fmr)
- Type: Shire of Toodyay; Heritage List
- Designated: 1 December 2012
- Part of: Stirling Terrace Streetscape Group (04128)
- Reference no.: 02579

St Stephen's Anglican Church is a heritage-listed Anglican church on Stirling Terrace, Toodyay, Western Australia. It was one of the earliest significant public buildings constructed in the town then named Newcastle.

== History ==
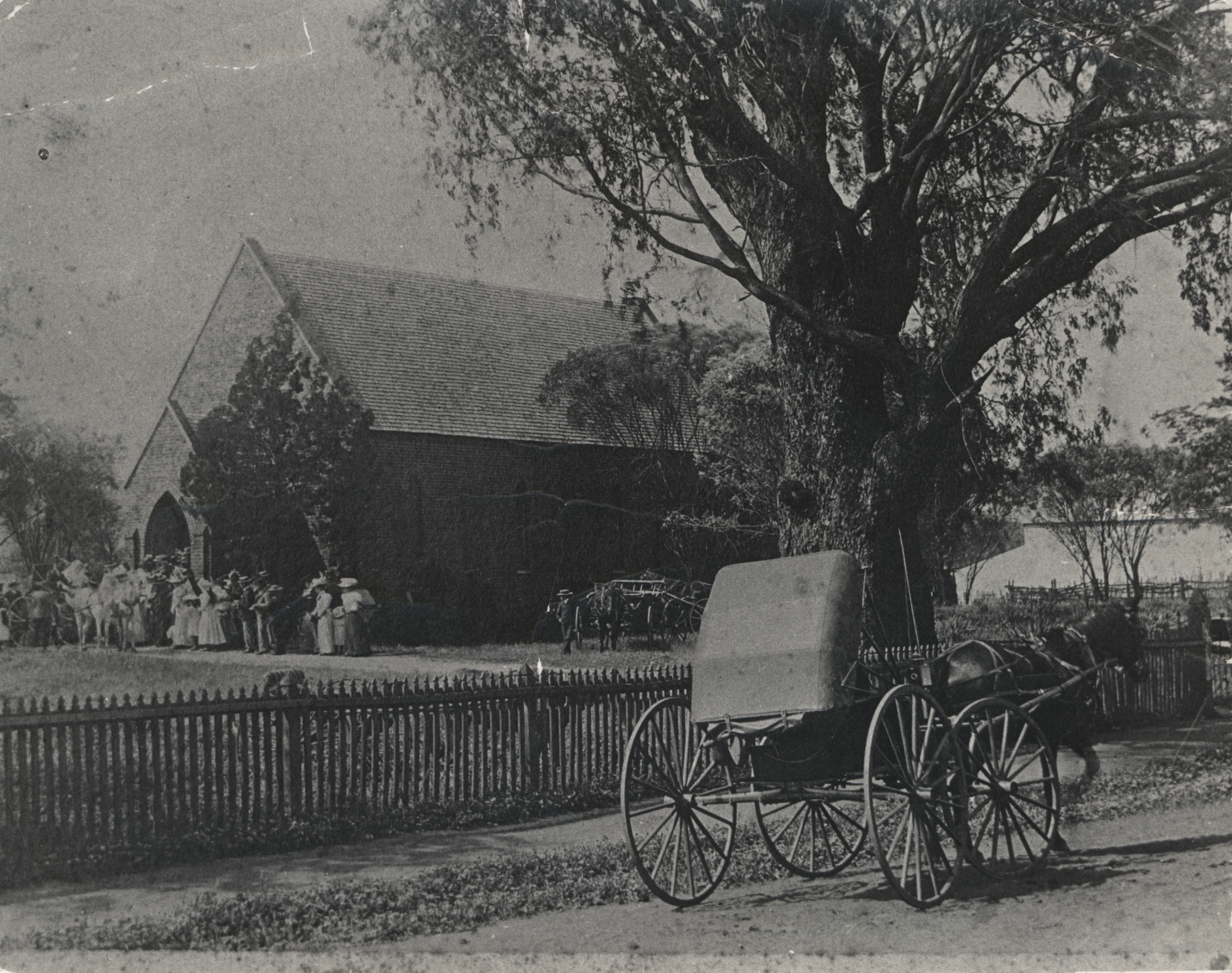
St Stephen's Anglican Church, Toodyay circa 1890s - 1910s.

The church was built by George Henry Hasell, assisted by stonemason Esau Wetherall and a shingle splitter with the surname MacKnoe. On 9 May 1862 Matthew Hale, in his role as Lord Bishop of the Anglican Diocese of Perth, consecrated the church and it opened for services. The first minister was Charles Harper.

A separate bell tower made of bush timber was later constructed and this remains on site. The bell was dedicated in December 1910 by Charles Riley, Bishop of Perth. The bell was made by Fred Metters & Co., Perth and donated by Charles Maxwell Lukin.

On 20 June 1915 a memorial service was held at St Stephen's for William Henry (Bill) Strahan who had been killed in the ANZAC action at Gallipoli during World War I. Strahan was the first Toodyay casualty of the war. Widespread grief saw a large attendance (about 195 people) at his funeral—roughly 1/5 of the district's population.

The shingled roof was replaced with corrugated iron in the mid-1940s.

On 18 March 1948 the sanctuary of St Stephen's church was consecrated by Archbishop Robert Moline, as a memorial to Charles Augustus Lee Steere and Roderick Yelverton Lee Steere, who lost their lives in World War II. The extension was designed by architect F.G.B. Hawkins and built by contractor Mr. Hawkins with bricks from the demolished Nunyle Agricultural Hall.

== Description ==
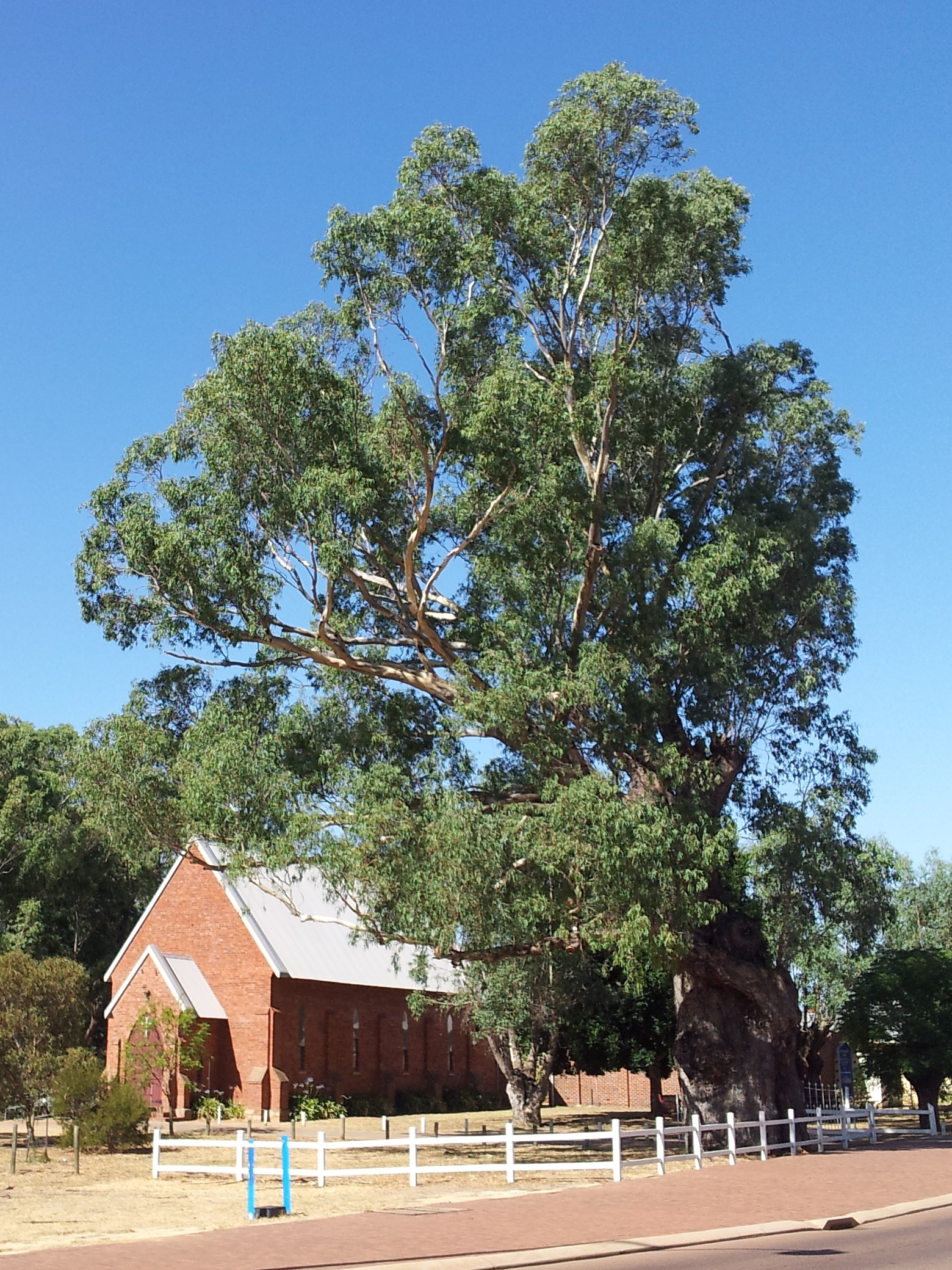
St Stephen's Church and flooded gum in Stirling Terrace, Toodyay

The architectural style of the church could be described as restrained Gothic with its pointed arched window and door surrounds. There are tall lancet windows to the north and south, with buttresses dividing the north and south façades into evenly spaced bays. The highly pitched roof is today covered by corrugated iron.

A flooded gum (Eucalyptus rudis), said to be over 400 years old, towers over the church. The trimming of the upper branches of the tree, giving it a somewhat lopsided appearance, was to prevent it striking overhead power lines which have since been run underground. Although the removal of the tree has been threatened in the past by development it is now regarded as an icon with its historical significance well appreciated.

== See also ==
- List of Anglican churches in Western Australia
- List of heritage places in the Shire of Toodyay
