= List of Australian military personnel killed at Anzac Cove on 25 April 1915 =

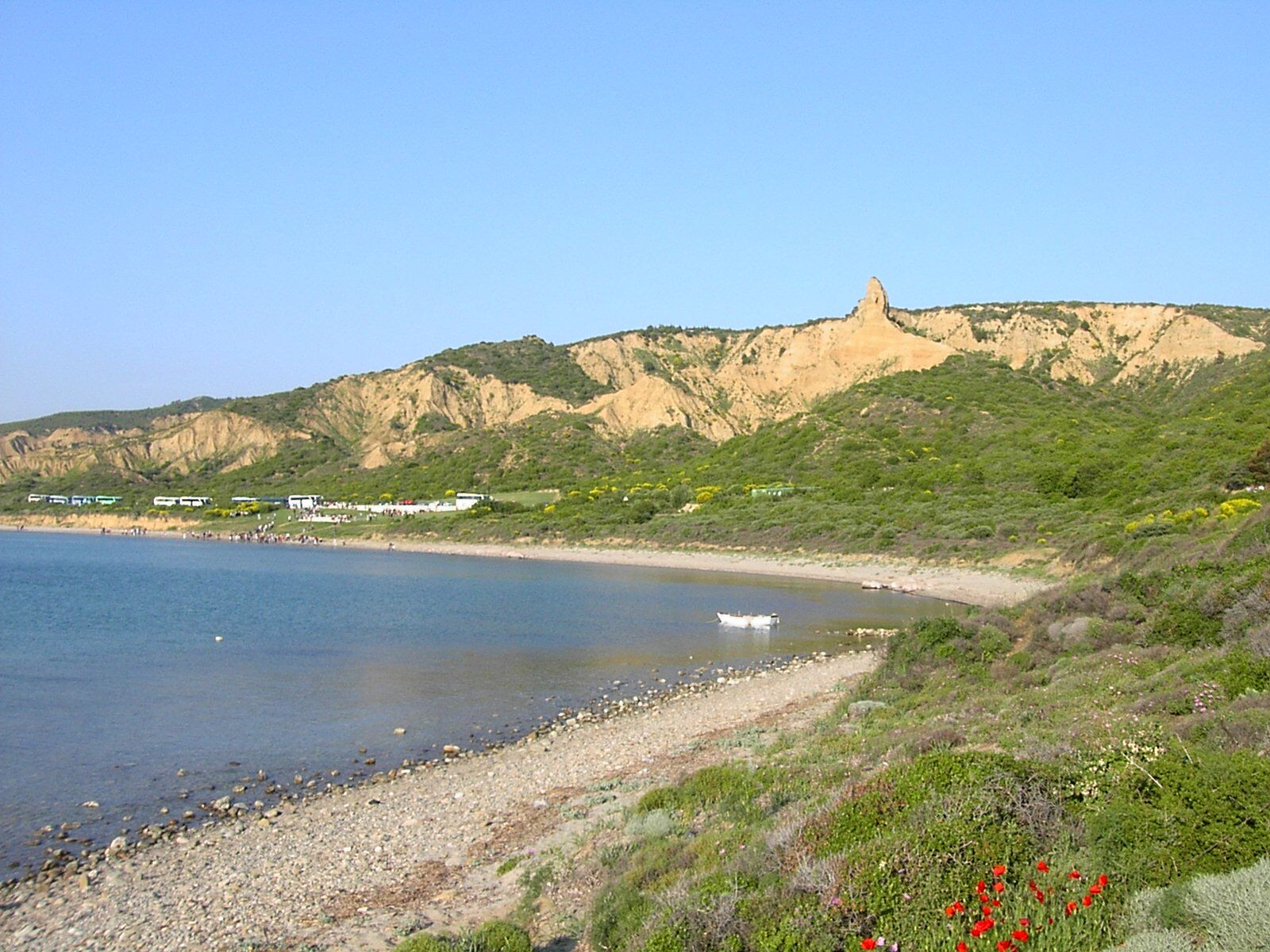
Anzac Cove

This is a list of notable people who were killed in action during the landing at Anzac Cove, Gallipoli, in Turkey on Sunday, 25 April 1915 while serving with Australian armed forces during World War I. The list is ordered by family name.

According to the historians at the Australian War Memorial, it is generally accepted that the total number of Australian casualties, killed and wounded at Anzac Cove, on 25 April 1915 is something of the order of 2,000 men; and, although no-one can be certain of the precise number, it is generally accepted that something like 650 Australian servicemen were killed in action at Anzac Cove on 25 April 1915—and, according to Stanley (2014), the "first wave to land at dawn on 25 April 1915 … came from just six companies of the 9th, 10th and 11th Battalions [of the Australian Imperial Force]" and, of those who landed in that first wave, 101 were killed in action.

Name	Service Number	Birthplace	Occupation at Enlistment	Age at death	Rank
Balfe, Joseph Rupert	—	Brunswick, Victoria	Fifth year medical student	25	Lieutenant, A Company; 6th Battalion, First A.I.F.
Cordner, Joseph Alan	180	Bridgewater On Loddon, Victoria	Clerk	24	Private, 6th Battalion, First A.I.F.
Crowl, Claude Terrelll	337	Stratford, Victoria	Farmer	22	Private, 8th Battalion, First A.I.F.
Fincher, Charles	472	Footscray, Victoria	Engine-driver	23	Private, 5th Battalion, First A.I.F.
Larkin, Edward Rennix	321	North Lambton, N.S.W.	Member of Parliament	34	Sergeant, 1st Battalion, First A.I.F.
McDonald, Fenley John	127	Nagambie, Victoria	Stock and station agent	23	Private, 7th Battalion, First A.I.F.
Pearce, Arthur Mueller	418	Sandhurst (Bendigo)	Clerk	30	Corporal, 7th Battalion, First A.I.F.
Strahan, William Henry	199	Toodyay, Western Australia	Orchardist	45	Sergeant, 16th Battalion, First A.I.F.
Swannell, Blair Inskip	—	Weston Underwood, Buckinghamshire, England	Not employed	39	Major, 1st Battalion, First A.I.F.

The last surviving individual who had served in any capacity for any of the combatants during the Gallipoli campaign was Alec Campbell (2731). Born in Tasmania on 26 February 1899, Campbell saw action at Gallipoli aged 16 (having given his age at the recruiting office as 18 years 4 months). He died in Tasmania on 16 May 2002, aged 103 years.

== See also ==
- List of Australian diarists of World War I
- Military history of Australia during World War I
