= Bert Butler (footballer, born 1889) =

Australian rules footballer (1889–1953)

Personal information
- Full name: Albert Lionel Butler
- Born: 9 February 1889; Carlton, Victoria
- Died: 15 May 1953 (aged 64); South Melbourne, Victoria
- Original team: Brunswick

Playing career^{1}
Years	Club	Games (Goals)
1910	Brunswick (VFA)	1 (0)
1911	St Kilda	3 (0)
1912–13	Brighton (VFA)	25 (1)
- ^{1} Playing statistics correct to the end of 1913.

Albert Lionel Butler (9 February 1889 – 15 May 1953) was an Australian rules footballer who played for the St Kilda Football Club in the Victorian Football League (VFL).

== Family ==
The son of Burris Butler (1860–1933), and Margaret Butler, née McDonald, Albert Lionel Butler was born in Carlton, Victoria on 9 February 1889.

He married Lena Rose Pim (1889–1982) on 20 June 1913.

== Football ==
=== Brunswick (VFA) ===
He played at full-back for Brunswick in the 1910 VFA Grand Final.

=== St Kilda (VFL) ===
On 14 June 1911, he was cleared from Brunswick to St Kilda.

He played his first senior VFL match for St Kilda, against South Melbourne on 8 July 1911 at the Lake Oval. He also played in the next two matches: against Fitzroy, on 15 July 1911, and against Melbourne on 22 July 1911.

==== Players' strike ====
However, because he was one of the 18 Senior St Kilda players who refused to play (on the Tuesday prior to the 29 July 1911 match against Carlton) in protest at the club committee's decision to bar a former team captain, Joe Hogan, and the father of star player Wels Eicke from the club's dressing room, he never played VFL football again.

=== Brighton (VFA) ===
On 1 May 1912 he was cleared from St Kilda to Brighton.

== Death ==
He died at Prince Henry's Hospital, St Kilda Road, on 15 May 1953.
