= Elijah Cordner =

Trinidadian footballer (born 2007)

Personal information
- Full name: Elijah John Cordner
- Date of birth: 3 September 2007 (age 19)
- Place of birth: Orlando, Florida, United States
- Height: 1.85 m (6 ft 1 in)
- Position: Centre-back

Team information
- Current team: Raków Częstochowa

Youth career
- Orlando FC Barca
- 2022–2026: Rayo Vallecano
- 2026–: Raków Częstochowa

International career^{‡}
| Years | Team | Apps | (Gls) |
| 2026– | Trinidad and Tobago | 1 | (0) |
- ‡ National team caps and goals as of 20:05, 21 April 2026 (UTC)

Elijah John Cordner (born 3 September 2007) is a professional footballer who plays as a centre-back for Ekstraklasa club Raków Częstochowa. Born in the United States, he plays for the Trinidad and Tobago national team.

== Club career ==
A former youth product of Orlando FC Barca and Rayo Vallecano, he moved to the Polish club Raków Częstochowa on 3 March 2026.

== International career ==
Cordner was born in the United States to Trinidadian parents, and holds dual Trinidadian and American citizenship. He was called up to the Trinidad and Tobago national team for a set of friendlies in March 2026. He debuted with Trinidad and Tobago as a substitute in a friendly 3–0 loss to Bolivia on 15 March 2026.
