= Michael Cordner =

Michael Cordner is an academic, author, and specialist in theatre and drama.

His particular interests lie in English drama from c.1580–1720 and the development of the theatre in the UK in the second half of the twentieth century.

A former professor in English and Related Literature at the University of York, Cordner is now professor of theatre at the School of Arts and Creative Technologies (formerly the Department of Theatre, Film, Television and Interactive Media). He is the former general editor of Oxford English Drama for Oxford University Press.

== Publications ==
Michael Cordner's books and articles include:

Editions

- George Farquhar, The Beaux' Stratagem (1976)
- Sir George Etherege, Plays (1982)
- Sir John Vanbrugh, Four Comedies (1989)
- Four Restoration Marriage Plays (1995)
- Richard Brinsley Sheridan, The School for Scandal and Other Plays (1998)

== Recent Articles ==
- "Annotation and Performance in Shakespeare", Essays in Criticism, 46 (1996), 289–301
- "Restoring Zeal-of-the-Land Busy", in Martin Butler (ed.), Re-Presenting Ben Jonson (1999)
- "Playwright versus Priest: Profanity and the Wit of Restoration Comedy", in Deborah Payne Fisk (ed.), The Cambridge Companion to English Restoration Theatre (2000), 209–225
- "Actors, Editors, and the Annotation of Shakespearian Playscripts", Shakespeare Survey, 55 (2002), pp. 181–198
- "'To Show Our Simply Skill': Scripts and Performances in Shakespearian Comedy", Shakespeare Survey, 56 (2003), 167–183
