= Charlie Fincher =

Australian rules footballer (1892–1915)

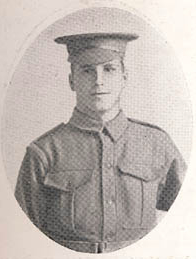

Personal information
- Full name: Charles Fincher
- Born: 23 January 1892; Footscray, Victoria
- Died: 25 April 1915 (aged 23); Anzac Cove, Gallipoli, Ottoman Turkey
- Original teams: Malmsbury and Scarsdale

Playing career^{1}
Years	Club	Games (Goals)
1913	South Melbourne	9 (5)
- ^{1} Playing statistics correct to the end of 1913.

Charles Fincher (23 January 1892 – 25 April 1915) was an Australian rules footballer who played with South Melbourne in the Victorian Football League (VFL), and with Essendon Town Football Club in the Victorian Football Association (VFA).

A private in the First AIF, he was killed in action during the Anzac Cove landings on 25 April 1915, as part of the first action of the Gallipoli campaign.

== Family ==
Second eldest of the nine children (six boys and three girls) of George Francis Fincher (1865–1959), and Margaret Lawrence Fincher (c.1866–1956), née Nicoll, he was born in Footscray, Victoria on 23 January 1892. The family moved to Lauriston, near Kyneton, Victoria. He attended Lauriston State School.

== Footballer ==
One of his young brothers, John Alexander "Jack" Fincher (1904–1970), was also a talented footballer, playing senior VFL football with Richmond (1927–1930) and with Footscray (1931–1933).

=== Country Footballer ===
Charlie Fincher was an exceptionally talented young footballer, playing with the senior Lauriston team when just 15, transferring to the side from Malmsbury, Victoria that played in the Kyneton District Association, and then, in 1911, he played the first of his two seasons with the Ballarat club Scarsdale. In his second year with Scarsdale he represented the Ballarat League in matches against Geelong, a combined Broken Hill side, and a combined VFL team.

=== South Melbourne ===
His form in the representative matches impressed the South Melbourne Football Club, and Finscher was invited to Melbourne to train with the team. Granted a clearance on 25 April 1913 (exactly two years before his death), he played his first senior VFL match with South Melbourne, against St Kilda, at the Lake Oval, on Saturday, 26 April 1913 (round one), as a rover. He played well and kicked one goal.

The next Saturday, he played in a tough match in very wet conditions against Carlton, at Princes Park, which South Melbourne drew with Carlton despite having five less scoring shots.

He missed the next two matches, then played well in South Melbourne's 14 point round five win over Geelong, scoring two goals, In round six, he played against Melbourne, then against Fitzroy and University.

He did not play for two weeks, then played again in rounds eleven, twelve, and thirteen. In his last match on 19 July 1913 (round thirteen), against Essendon, South Melbourne unexpectedly lost by 20 points (South Melbourne did not scoring a goal until the last quarter).

=== Essendon Town Football Club ===
On 29 April, he was granted a clearance from South Melbourne to the Essendon Town Football Club, also known as Essendon 'A', and was given a permit to play with them.

He played his first match for Essendon 'A', against Brighton, on Saturday, 2 May 1914 (round four); he played well in a team that beat Brighton by 89 points.

He played consistently well for the team in the remaining games of the season, playing his last VFA game in the 31 point, 8.10 (58) to 13.11 (89), Semi-Final loss to North Melbourne (the eventual premiers in 1914).

== Soldier ==
At the time of his enlistment (18 August 1914), he was living in Albert Park and was employed as an engine-driver with the Metropolitan Gas Company. Two of his brothers, Lieutenant George Francis Fincher (3729), and Lieutenant James Francis Fincher (3730), also served in the First AIF; and each of his brothers was Mentioned in Despatches.

He embarked from Melbourne on the HMAT Orvieto on 21 October 1914, bound for Egypt and the Dardanelles. Midway across the Indian Ocean, their ship encountered, and took on board, survivors from the German raider, the SMS Emden, that had been defeated by HMAS Sydney.

== Death ==
Fincher was killed in action during the Landing at Anzac Cove on 25 April 1915, as part of the Gallipoli campaign.

== Remembered ==
His remains were never recovered; and he has no known Grave. His name is recorded on the Lone Pine Memorial at Gallipoli, Turkey; it is also located at panel 3 in the Commemorative Area at the Australian War Memorial, and it appears on the side of the pedestal of the War Memorial at Kyneton, Victoria.

On Saturday evening, 21 August 1915, the Essendon Town Football Club conducted a farewell function for seven of its members who had enlisted. There were many patriotic speeches given, and presentations were made to each of the enlisted men. As a mark of respect, one place was kept vacant throughout the evening; it had the name of Charlie Fincher attached to it. – The Essendon Gazette and Keilor, Bulla and Broadmeadows Reporter, 26 August 1915.

== See also ==
- List of Australian military personnel killed at Anzac Cove on 25 April 1915
- List of Victorian Football League players who died on active service

== Sources ==
- Charlie Fincher's playing statistics from AFL Tables
- Holmesby, Russell & Main, Jim (2007). The Encyclopedia of AFL Footballers. 7th ed. Melbourne: Bas Publishing.
- Main, J. & Allen, D., "Fincher, Charles", pp. 62–64 in Main, J. & Allen, D., Fallen – The Ultimate Heroes: Footballers Who Never Returned From War, Crown Content, (Melbourne), 2002.
- Football: Permits to Players: The League (C. Fincher, Ballarat to South Melbourne), The Argus, (Saturday, 26 April 1913), p.20.
- Football: Permits to Players, The Argus, (Saturday, 30 April 1914), p,13.
- "Patriotic Mr. Charlie Fincher", The Essendon Gazette and Keilor, Bulla and Broadmeadows Reporter, (Thursday, 24 September 1914), p.5.
- Australian Casualties: 42nd List Issued: Killed in Action: Victoria (Pte. Fincher, C., 5th Batt., Lauriston), The Argus, (Tuesday, 22 June 1915), p.11.
- Family Notices: Killed in Action: Fincher, The Argus, (Saturday, 26 June 1915), p.11.
- Personal Particulars: Private Charlie Fincher, The Argus, (Saturday, 26 June 1915), p.15.
- Roll of Honour (Obituary), The Essendon Gazette and Keilor, Bulla and Broadmeadows Reporter, (Thursday, 1 July 1915), p.3.
- Farewell to Footballers, The Argus, (Monday, 23 August 1915), p.10.
- Family Notices: In Memoriam: On Active Service: Fincher, The Argus, (Saturday, 26 April 1930), p.1.
- World War I Nominal Roll: Charles Fincher (472)
- World War I Embarkation Roll: Charles Fincher (472)
- Australian War Memorial Roll of Honour "Circular": Charles Fincher (472)
- Australian War Memorial Roll of Honour: Charles Fincher (472)
- National Archives of Australia: World War I Service Record: Charles Fincher (472)
- Commonwealth War Graves Commission casualty Details: Fincher, Charles (472)
