= Corder =

Corder may refer to:

- Corder (surname)
- Corder, Missouri, a city in Lafayette county
- Corder House, a building in Sunderland
- Corder Catchpool (1883–1952), English Quaker and pacifist
- Commander Corder, a fictional character from the 1995 TV serial, The Final Cut
