= Douglas Cordner =

Irish cricketer (1887–1946)

Personal information
- Full name: Arthur Douglas Cordner
- Born: 30 August 1887; Ireland
- Died: 3 July 1946 (aged 58); Dublin, Leinster, Ireland
- Batting: Right-handed
- Role: Wicket-keeper

Domestic team information
- Years: Team
- 1926: Ireland

Career statistics
Competition	First-class
Matches	1
Runs scored	3
Batting average	3.00
100s/50s	–/–
Top score	3*
Catches/stumpings	–/–
- Source: Cricinfo, 30 December 2021

Arthur Douglas Cordner (30 August 1887 in Ireland – 3 July 1946 in Dublin) was an Irish cricketer. A right-handed batsman and wicket-keeper, he played three times for the Ireland cricket team, making his debut against Scotland in July 1926. One of his matches for Ireland had first-class status.
