= Bert Whittington =

Australian rules footballer

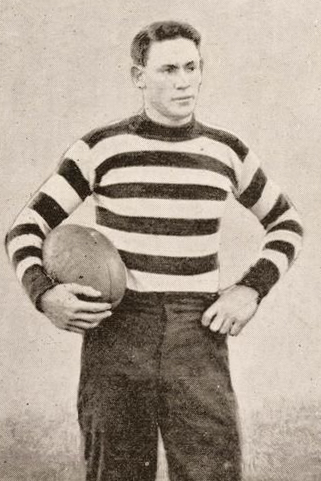
- Whittington in 1910

Personal information
- Full name: Albert John Whittington
- Born: 1 January 1885; Geelong, Victoria
- Died: 4 July 1969 (aged 84); Geelong, Victoria
- Original team: Corio

Playing career^{1}
Years	Club	Games (Goals)
1908–1911	Geelong	27 (3)
- ^{1} Playing statistics correct to the end of 1911.

Albert John Whittington (1 January 1885 – 4 July 1969) was an Australian rules footballer who played with the Geelong Football Club in the VFL. He scored after the siren to tie the game for Geelong against Melbourne, the score at 54 all in 1911.
