= Bill O'Brien (footballer, born 1887) =

Australian rules footballer

Personal information
- Full name: William Joseph O'Brien
- Born: 27 September 1887; Elmhurst, Victoria
- Died: 18 January 1943 (aged 55); Temora, New South Wales
- Original team: Williamstown

Playing career^{1}
Years	Club	Games (Goals)
1910–11	St Kilda	4 (1)
- ^{1} Playing statistics correct to the end of 1911.

William Joseph O'Brien (27 September 1887 – 18 January 1943) was an Australian rules footballer who played with St Kilda in the Victorian Football League (VFL).

O'Brien was also a policeman, and then a farmer in Ariah Park, enlisted for part-time duty in the Volunteer Defence Corps during World War II at the age of 55, but died before the end of the war.
