= Larry Cordner =

Australian rules footballer, born 1911

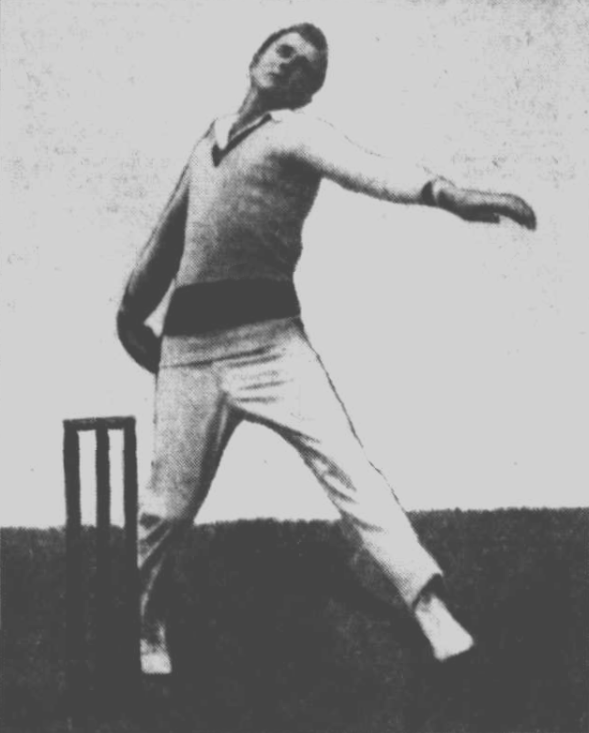

Personal information
- Full name: Laurence Osmaston Cordner
- Born: 7 February 1911; Warrnambool, Victoria
- Died: 11 July 1992 (aged 81); Penshurst, Victoria
- Batting: Right-handed
- Bowling: Leg-break and googly

Domestic team information
- Years: Team
- 1930/31–1933/34: Victoria

Career statistics
Competition	First-class
Matches	3
Runs scored	43
Batting average	14.33
100s/50s	0/0
Top score	30*
Balls bowled	760
Wickets	7
Bowling average	68.85
5 wickets in innings	0
10 wickets in match	0
Best bowling	3/154
Catches/stumpings	2/–
- Source: CricketArchive, 31 December 2014

Laurence Osmaston Cordner (7 February 1911 – 11 July 1992) was an Australian sportsman who played first-class cricket for Victoria and Australian rules football in the VFL with Hawthorn.

Cordner made just one VFL appearance for Hawthorn, against Collingwood at Glenferrie Oval during the 1933 season. His cousins were more successful, two of them Denis and Don, are members of the Melbourne Football Club Team of the Century. His half-brother Alan Cordner also played senior VFL football.

The first of Cordner's three first-class cricket matches came in the Sheffield Shield competition of 1930–31 against South Australia, with his only notable contribution being the wicket of Bert Tobin. Four weeks later, at the MCG, he was part of the Victorian team which played a tour match with the West Indians. He took five wickets in the match, including Lionel Birkett twice and a prized victim in George Headley. Cordner then saved the game for Victoria with the bat by making 30 not out in the fourth innings as Victoria hung on with nine wickets down. His final match came in 1934 against Western Australia.

== See also ==
- List of Australian rules football families
