= Tom Baird (footballer) =

Australian rules footballer

Personal information
- Full name: Thomas Fairley Baird
- Born: 6 May 1884; Geelong, Victoria
- Died: 23 August 1939 (aged 55); Ormond, Victoria
- Original team: Prahran Juniors

Playing career^{1}
Years	Club	Games (Goals)
1910–11	St Kilda	10 (7)
- ^{1} Playing statistics correct to the end of 1911.

Thomas Fairley Baird (6 May 1884 – 23 August 1939) was an Australian rules footballer who played with St Kilda in the Victorian Football League (VFL).
