= John Cordner (politician) =

John Cordner (3 July 1816 – 22 June 1894) was the first Unitarian minister in Canada.

Cordner was born in Ireland, where his family in Newry belonged to a politically radical sect of the Presbyterian Church in Ireland. Cordner studied at the Royal Belfast Academical Institution, then worked in commerce. He was ordained in 1843 as a Unitarian minister. That year, he emigrated to Montreal to become minister to the first Unitarian congregation in Canada.

Cordner's ministry was successful and popular, especially among the upper-middle classes and the business elite. He wrote and edited several magazines. In sermons and speeches, he championed progressive issues: world peace, woman's rights, and anti-slavery in the US, among others. He was succeeded by William Sullivan Barnes.

He retired to Boston for the warmer climate where he died in 1894. He was still writing on issues important to the Unitarian movement.
