= Denis Cordner =

Australian rules footballer, industrial chemist and diplomat

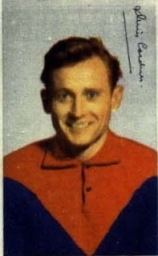

Personal information
- Born: 28 June 1924; Diamond Creek, Victoria
- Died: 17 October 1990 (aged 66); Kew East, Victoria
- Original team: University Blacks (VAFA)
- Debut: Round 5, 1943, Melbourne vs. Richmond, at the MCG
- Height: 191 cm (6 ft 3 in)
- Weight: 91 kg (201 lb)

Playing career^{1}
Years	Club	Games (Goals)
1943, 1948–56	Melbourne	152 (82)
- ^{1} Playing statistics correct to the end of 1956.

Career highlights
- 3× VFL premiership: 1948, 1955, 1956; 2× Melbourne Keith 'Bluey' Truscott Medallist: 1949, 1954; Melbourne leading goalkicker: 1950; Melbourne captain: 1951–1953; Melbourne Team of the Century–Ruckman; Melbourne Hall of Fame; 2× Sporting Life Team of the Year: 1952, 1955

George Denis Pruen Cordner (28 June 1924 – 17 October 1990) was an Australian rules footballer, industrial chemist and diplomat.

== Early years ==
Cordner was the third of four sons to Edward "Ted" Cordner and Margaret Constance née Pruen. Like his father, Cordner and his brothers Ted (1919–1996), Don (1922–2009) and John (1929–2016) were also notable sportsmen. All of them represented Melbourne Grammar School, University Blacks and Melbourne in Australian rules football.

== Football ==
=== Melbourne (VFL) ===
Cordner made his senior VFL football debut in Round 5 of the 1943 VFL season for Melbourne against Richmond at Punt Road Oval while on leave from the Royal Australian Navy. It was the only time he played with his older brothers Don and Ted. Cordner was flattened five seconds into the match, but recovered and went on to kick two goals in a losing cause.

=== University Blacks (VAFA) ===
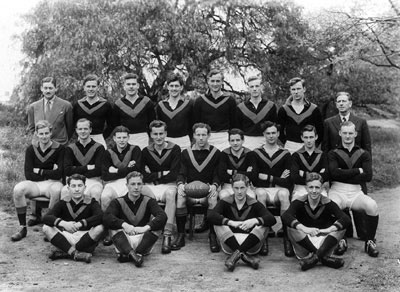
University Blacks in 1946 – Cordner is in the back row, 4th from the right

Following the war, Cordner played in the Victorian Amateur Football Association (VAFA) for the University Blacks while studying a Bachelor of Science, specializing in metallurgy. He was the fifth Cordner to represent the Blacks and provided outstanding service in his three seasons with the club, finishing second in the VAFA A Grade Best and Fairest Award count in 1946 and 1947 before winning it in 1948. That year he was also club premiership captain.

=== Melbourne (VFL) ===
At the same time, Cordner was still a registered Melbourne player, and was called up to play his second senior VFL game in the drawn 1948 VFL Grand Final, where he played a sterling high marking game at centre half-back. He played again in the Grand Final Replay and was a Melbourne premiership player in just his third game of senior football.

Cordner switched permanently to the Melbourne Football Club in 1949, and played for the club primarily in the ruck for the next eight years. He was particularly noted for his ability in wet weather; after watching Melbourne's win over Geelong in the 1954 Preliminary Final, Richmond ruckman and Brownlow medallist of that season Roy Wright wrote in The Herald:

He is the greatest wet weather ruckman I have seen. Cordner's a freak. Wet weather is bad news for most big men but not for Cordner. He seems to be able to mark the greasy ball when and how he likes. It is fascinating to watch him mark the wet ball. He gets well up in the air, seems to funnel the ball into his arms and then smothers it onto his chest. Before he retires I will have to persuade him to give me a few lessons in wet weather tactics.

Cordner went on to play in two more premiership teams for Melbourne, in 1955 and 1956. He retired at the end of the 1956 season, and was notable for having played his entire VFL career as an amateur.

== Cricket ==
Cordner was also a capable cricketer, known for his bowling. He played 40 district cricket matches for University between 1946/47 and 1953/54, taking 60 wickets at 23.8. In an intervarsity match at the University Oval in Sydney in 1949, he took nine wickets (six of those in the second innings) for the match to help Melbourne beat Sydney.

== Life after football ==
=== Australian Consul-General in New York ===
In September 1981, Cordner was appointed Australian Consul-General in New York. He took up the post in March 1982. Cordner's wife Pat was mugged on her first day out in New York city. In March 1984, Cordner was asked to return to Australia within three months.

=== Business leader ===
On returning to Australia, Cordner served in a number of leadership positions. He became a chairman of John Holland Constructions, chairman of Australian Motor Industries and a director of the Australian branch of British Petroleum and Plessey Pacific.

== Death ==
Cordner died of coronary heart disease on 17 October 1990 at his home in East Kew, and was buried in Point Lonsdale Cemetery. He was survived by his wife and two daughters.

== Posthumous honours ==
=== Team of the Century (MFC) ===
In 2000, he was named in the Melbourne's "Team of the Century" as the starting ruckman, with Ron Barassi as his ruck-rover, and Stuart Spencer as his rover (his brother, Don Cordner, was selected as the back-pocket ruckman).

=== Hall of Fame (MFC) ===
In 2001, he was one of the 24 inaugural inductees into the Melbourne Football Club's "Hall of Fame" (his brother, Don Cordner, was also an inaugural inductee).

=== "150 Heroes" (MFC) ===
On 7 June 2008, as part of its 150th anniversary celebrations, the Melbourne Football Club announced its list of "150 Heroes", Denis Cordner and two of his brothers, Don Cordner, and Ted Cordner, were named on the list.

== See also ==
- Australian football at the 1956 Summer Olympics
- List of consuls-general of Australia in New York

== Bibliography ==
- Hutchinson, Garrie (2008). Heroes : 150 players, 150 years : Melbourne Football Club. Prahran, Victoria: Hardie Grant Books. ISBN 9781740666152.

Diplomatic posts
Preceded by Bob Cotton	Australian Consul General in New York; 1982–1984	Succeeded by John Taylor
