= Ted Cordner =

Australian rules footballer, born 1919

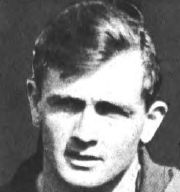

Personal information
- Full name: Edward Pruen Cordner
- Born: 31 January 1919; Cheltenham, Gloucestershire, England
- Died: 4 March 1996 (aged 77); Greensborough, Victoria
- Original team: University Blacks
- Height: 188 cm (6 ft 2 in)
- Weight: 89 kg (196 lb)

Playing career^{1}
Years	Club	Games (Goals)
1941–43, 1946	Melbourne	52 (0)
- ^{1} Playing statistics correct to the end of 1946.

Edward Pruen Cordner (31 January 1919 – 4 March 1996) was an Australian rules footballer who played with Melbourne in the Victorian Football League (VFL) during the 1940s.

== Family ==
The older brother of Melbourne Team of the Century members Denis and Don Cordner, Ted would have played more than 52 games had he not pursued a medical career. His youngest brother was John.

He married Elizabeth Anne Baillieu on 4 December 1951.

== Football ==
Cordner joined the club in 1941 and was a member of their premiership winning side. He missed the entire 1944 and 1945 seasons due to him being busy serving as a naval doctor but managed to play 19 games in 1946 as well as representing Victoria in an interstate match.
