= Don Cordner =

Australian rules footballer

- Cordner in 1945

Personal information
- Full name: Donald Pruen Cordner
- Born: 21 January 1922
- Died: 13 May 2009 (aged 87)
- Original team: Melbourne University (MAFA)
- Height: 188 cm (6 ft 2 in)
- Weight: 89 kg (196 lb)
- Position: Ruckman

Playing career^{1}
Years	Club	Games (Goals)
1941–1950	Melbourne	166 (23)
- ^{1} Playing statistics correct to the end of 1950.

Career highlights
- 2× VFL premierships: 1941, 1948; Brownlow Medallist: 1946; Keith 'Bluey' Truscott Medallist: 1943; Melbourne captain: 1948–1949; Melbourne Team of the Century–back pocket; Melbourne Hall of Fame–Legend status; 2× Sporting Life team of the year: 1947, 1949

Dr Donald Pruen Cordner (21 January 1922 – 13 May 2009), M.B.B.S. was an Australian rules footballer who played with Melbourne in the Victorian Football League (VFL) during the 1940s. His brothers Denis, John and Ted also played for the club. Captain of the Melbourne Football Club, he was also the only amateur footballer to win the Brownlow Medal.

== Playing career ==
Cordner attended Melbourne Grammar School where he was a keen sportsman excelling at cricket, athletics and Australian rules football. Whilst studying medicine he played for Melbourne University in 1940 prior to joining the VFL.

A ruckman who was also used in defence, Cordner made his debut for Melbourne in the 1941 finals series, playing in their winning grand final in just his second appearance for the club. Rarely injured, he played 144 consecutive games between 1942 and 1950. Throughout his entire football career he played as an amateur.

In 1943, Cordner was named the inaugural winner of the Keith 'Bluey' Truscott Medal. Although Melbourne had been awarding the club Best & Fairest since 1935, it had remained unnamed until coach "Checker" Hughes dedicated the award to Truscott's memory after the Melbourne star and Air Force pilot perished in a training exercise earlier that year.

Cordner created history when he became the first Melbourne Cricket Club member to win the Brownlow Medal in 1946 and also the only amateur player to win the Medal. He also finished equal sixth in the 1947 Brownlow Medal count.

In 1948 he was named club captain, leading the Demons to the 1948 Premiership in the Grand FInal against Essendon. He also captained Victoria in interstate football in the same year. At the end of the 1949 season he stepped down from the captaincy and retired from football after the 1950 season citing the difficulty in balancing football with his medical practice in Diamond Creek.

== Life after football ==
Cordner continued to be heavily involved with football while running his medical practice at Diamond Creek for 46 years.

He was a member of the VFL Tribunal in 1962 and 1963 and sat on the board of the Melbourne Football Club for two stints—from 1957 to 1958 and 1964–71. He also served on the Melbourne Cricket Club committee from 1964 to 1992 and was president between 1985 and 1992.

Cordner served on the School Council of Melbourne Grammar School for 20 years with five years served as chairman. In 1989 the Cordner-Eggleston Cup was jointly named in his honour being the annual football match played between Melbourne Grammar and Scotch College.

In 1993 the entrance to the MCC Members stand at the Melbourne Cricket Ground was named in his honour and he was named Victorian of the Year.

In 2000, he was named in the back pocket in Melbourne's official Team of the Century.

Don Cordner died on 13 May 2009 at age 87.

When the AFLW competition was formed in 2017, his granddaughter Harriet was able to continue the Cordner link to Melbourne when she was picked in Melbourne's inaugural team.

== See also ==
- List of Australian rules football families

== Bibliography ==
- Hutchinson, Garrie (2008). Heroes : 150 players, 150 years : Melbourne Football Club. Prahran, Victoria: Hardie Grant Books. ISBN 978-1-74066-615-2.
