= John Cordner (sportsman) =

Australian sportsman

Personal information
- Full name: John Pruen Cordner
- Born: 20 March 1929; Diamond Creek, Victoria
- Died: 10 December 2016 (aged 87)
- Batting: Right-handed
- Bowling: Left-arm fast-medium

Domestic team information
- Years: Team
- 1951/52: Victoria
- 1952: Warwickshire

Career statistics
| Competition | First-class |
|---|---|
| Matches | 4 |
| Runs scored | 13 |
| Batting average | 6.50 |
| 100s/50s | 0/0 |
| Top score | 8* |
| Balls bowled | 612 |
| Wickets | 3 |
| Bowling average | 78.66 |
| 5 wickets in innings | 0 |
| 10 wickets in match | 0 |
| Best bowling | 2/37 |
| Catches/stumpings | 3/– |
- Source: CricketArchive, 10 April 2023

John Pruen Cordner (20 March 1929 – 10 December 2016) was an Australian sportsman who played first-class cricket for Victoria and Australian rules football in the Victorian Football League (VFL) with Melbourne.

Born in Diamond Creek, Victoria, Cordner came from a famous Australian rules football family with three brothers, Don, Denis and Ted all having noted careers for the Melbourne Football Club. John spent just one season with Melbourne, in 1951, and played six VFL games.

Unlike his brothers, John excelled at cricket and made his first-class debut for Victoria in the 1951/52 Sheffield Shield season. Playing against Queensland at Brisbane he dismissed both openers, Leyland Sanders and Wally Grout, with his left-arm fast-medium bowling to finish with figures of 2 for 37 in the first innings. Despite playing another three first-class matches he only managed to take one further wicket. The last of those matches was for English side Warwickshire when they took on the touring Indian cricket team. He was in England at the time studying nuclear science. He played 34 district cricket matches for University, and took 80 wickets at 22.1.

He died in December 2016.
