= Harrie Hattam =

Australian rules footballer

Personal information
- Full name: Harrie Lewis Hattam
- Born: 7 July 1890; Footscray, Victoria
- Died: 12 January 1947 (aged 56); Brighton, Victoria
- Original team: Oakleigh
- Height: 178 cm (5 ft 10 in)
- Weight: 77 kg (170 lb)
- Position: Defence

Playing career^{1}
Years	Club	Games (Goals)
1910–15	St Kilda	84 (2)
- ^{1} Playing statistics correct to the end of 1915.

Harrie Lewis Hattam (7 July 1890 – 12 January 1947) was an Australian rules footballer who played with St Kilda in the Victorian Football League (VFL).
