= Bert Pierce =

Australian rules footballer

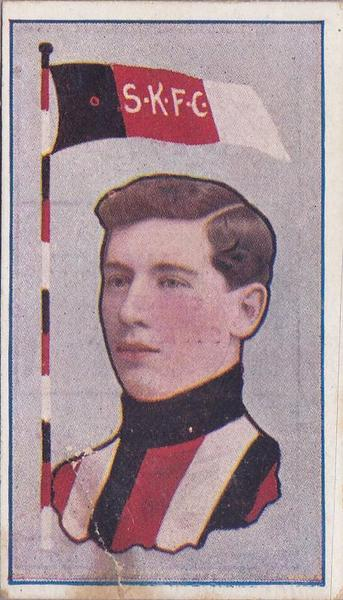
- Cigarette card of Pierce in 1912

Personal information
- Full name: Robert Bertram Pierce
- Born: 8 March 1886; Bendigo, Victoria
- Died: 14 August 1968 (aged 82); Bendigo, Victoria
- Position: Centre

Playing career^{1}
| Years | Club | Games (Goals) |
| 1909–1913 | St Kilda | 64 (10) |

Representative team honours
| Years | Team | Games (Goals) |
| 1911 | Victoria | |
- ^{1} Playing statistics correct to the end of 1913.

Robert Bertram Pierce (8 March 1886 – 14 August 1968) was an Australian rules footballer who played for the St Kilda Football Club in the Victorian Football League (VFL).
