= Bill Woodcock (footballer) =

Australian rules footballer

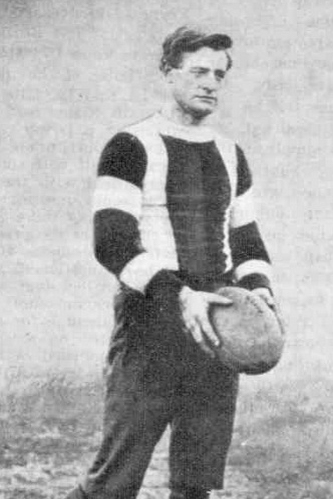
- Woodcock in 1910

Personal information
- Full name: Herbert Miller Woodcock
- Born: 29 June 1888; North Adelaide, South Australia
- Died: 6 October 1957 (aged 69); Windsor, Victoria
- Original team: St Kilda Wednesday
- Height: 182 cm (6 ft 0 in)
- Weight: 96 kg (212 lb)
- Position: Ruck shepherd

Playing career^{1}
Years	Club	Games (Goals)
1908–14, 1918–21	St Kilda	155 (48)
- ^{1} Playing statistics correct to the end of 1921.

Herbert Miller Woodcock (29 June 1888 – 6 October 1957) was an Australian rules footballer who played for St Kilda in the Victorian Football League (VFL).

Woodcock, who was recruited to St Kilda locally, used his powerful build to good effect as a ruck shepherd. Also a butcher by profession, Woodcock participated in the 1913 Grand Final which they lost to Fitzroy. He joined former St Kilda teammates Ernie Sellars and George Morrissey at East Perth in 1915 and played there for three seasons. In 1918 he returned to St Kilda and remained with the club until 1921.
