= 1911 VFL season =

15th season of the Victorian Football League (VFL)

1911 VFL premiership season
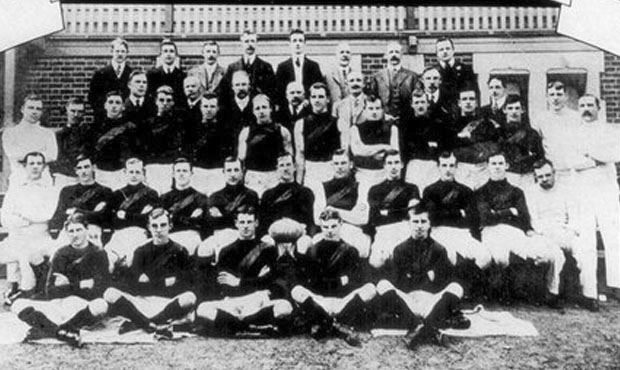
- Essendon 1911 VFL premiership team
- Date: 29 April – 23 September 1911
- Teams: 10
- Premiers: Essendon; 3rd premiership
- Minor premiers: Essendon; 2nd minor premiership
- Leading goalkicker medallist: Harry Brereton (Melbourne); 46 goals
- Matches played: 93

The 1911 VFL season was the 15th season of the Victorian Football League (VFL), the highest-level senior Australian rules football competition in Victoria. The season featured ten clubs and ran from 29 April to 23 September, comprising an 18-match home-and-away season followed by a three-week finals series featuring the top four clubs. The season was the beginning of the league's professional era, with clubs permitted for the first time to pay players beyond the reimbursement of expenses.

Essendon won the premiership, defeating Collingwood by six points in the 1911 VFL grand final; it was Essendon's third VFL premiership. Essendon also won the minor premiership by finishing atop the home-and-away ladder with a 15–2–1 win–loss–draw record. Melbourne's Harry Brereton won the leading goalkicker medal as the league's leading goalkicker.

== Background ==
In 1911, the VFL competition consisted of ten teams of 18 on-the-field players each, with no "reserves", although any of the 18 players who had left the playing field for any reason could later resume their place on the field at any time during the match.

Each team played each other twice in a home-and-away season of 18 rounds.

Once the 18 round home-and-away season had finished, the 1911 VFL Premiers were determined by the specific format and conventions of the amended "Argus system".

== Home-and-away season ==
=== Round 1 ===
Home team	Home team score	Away team	Away team score	Venue	Date
South Melbourne	14.18 (102)	University	5.10 (40)	Lake Oval	29 April 1911
Collingwood	14.10 (94)	Richmond	9.11 (65)	Victoria Park	29 April 1911
St Kilda	10.6 (66)	Geelong	7.15 (57)	Junction Oval	29 April 1911
Melbourne	10.12 (72)	Fitzroy	11.4 (70)	MCG	29 April 1911
Essendon	5.15 (45)	Carlton	6.9 (45)	EMCG	29 April 1911

=== Round 2 ===
Home team	Home team score	Away team	Away team score	Venue	Date
Geelong	7.12 (54)	Melbourne	7.12 (54)	Corio Oval	6 May 1911
Carlton	10.6 (66)	South Melbourne	10.6 (66)	Princes Park	6 May 1911
University	10.9 (69)	St Kilda	6.7 (43)	MCG	6 May 1911
Richmond	3.11 (29)	Essendon	10.16 (76)	Punt Road Oval	6 May 1911
Fitzroy	4.10 (34)	Collingwood	7.7 (49)	Brunswick Street Oval	6 May 1911

=== Round 3 ===
Home team	Home team score	Away team	Away team score	Venue	Date
St Kilda	2.5 (17)	South Melbourne	10.13 (73)	Junction Oval	13 May 1911
Richmond	6.17 (53)	University	6.5 (41)	Punt Road Oval	13 May 1911
Collingwood	8.17 (65)	Geelong	10.8 (68)	Victoria Park	13 May 1911
Carlton	6.7 (43)	Fitzroy	6.9 (45)	Princes Park	13 May 1911
Melbourne	0.9 (9)	Essendon	6.11 (47)	MCG	13 May 1911

=== Round 4 ===
Home team	Home team score	Away team	Away team score	Venue	Date
Geelong	8.12 (60)	Richmond	6.11 (47)	Corio Oval	20 May 1911
Fitzroy	10.24 (84)	St Kilda	4.6 (30)	Brunswick Street Oval	20 May 1911
South Melbourne	12.13 (85)	Melbourne	8.11 (59)	Lake Oval	20 May 1911
Essendon	21.12 (138)	Collingwood	7.11 (53)	EMCG	20 May 1911
University	6.8 (44)	Carlton	9.11 (65)	MCG	20 May 1911

=== Round 5 ===
Home team	Home team score	Away team	Away team score	Venue	Date
Melbourne	9.15 (69)	St Kilda	4.7 (31)	MCG	27 May 1911
Fitzroy	8.17 (65)	Geelong	4.8 (32)	Brunswick Street Oval	27 May 1911
Essendon	12.14 (86)	University	6.6 (42)	EMCG	27 May 1911
Carlton	13.11 (89)	Richmond	4.15 (39)	Princes Park	27 May 1911
South Melbourne	4.10 (34)	Collingwood	5.10 (40)	Lake Oval	27 May 1911

=== Round 6 ===
Home team	Home team score	Away team	Away team score	Venue	Date
Richmond	8.14 (62)	South Melbourne	7.12 (54)	Punt Road Oval	3 June 1911
Collingwood	6.13 (49)	Melbourne	5.13 (43)	Victoria Park	3 June 1911
University	5.12 (42)	Fitzroy	10.16 (76)	MCG	3 June 1911
Geelong	6.6 (42)	Essendon	8.11 (59)	Corio Oval	3 June 1911
St Kilda	5.12 (42)	Carlton	6.16 (52)	Junction Oval	3 June 1911

=== Round 7 ===
Home team	Home team score	Away team	Away team score	Venue	Date
Melbourne	6.12 (48)	Richmond	9.15 (69)	MCG	5 June 1911
Fitzroy	3.5 (23)	South Melbourne	10.11 (71)	Brunswick Street Oval	5 June 1911
Essendon	9.10 (64)	St Kilda	3.6 (24)	EMCG	5 June 1911
Collingwood	10.17 (77)	University	7.9 (51)	Victoria Park	5 June 1911
Geelong	7.7 (49)	Carlton	5.8 (38)	Corio Oval	5 June 1911

=== Round 8 ===
Home team	Home team score	Away team	Away team score	Venue	Date
Essendon	8.7 (55)	Fitzroy	3.2 (20)	EMCG	10 June 1911
Carlton	7.13 (55)	Collingwood	2.10 (22)	Princes Park	10 June 1911
St Kilda	3.8 (26)	Richmond	6.6 (42)	Junction Oval	10 June 1911
University	5.9 (39)	Melbourne	9.13 (67)	MCG	10 June 1911
South Melbourne	7.10 (52)	Geelong	5.9 (39)	Lake Oval	10 June 1911

=== Round 9 ===
Home team	Home team score	Away team	Away team score	Venue	Date
Geelong	10.12 (72)	University	9.6 (60)	Corio Oval	17 June 1911
Collingwood	12.13 (85)	St Kilda	4.8 (32)	Victoria Park	17 June 1911
Richmond	4.12 (36)	Fitzroy	5.8 (38)	Punt Road Oval	17 June 1911
South Melbourne	6.8 (44)	Essendon	5.11 (41)	Lake Oval	17 June 1911
Melbourne	9.2 (56)	Carlton	13.11 (89)	MCG	17 June 1911

=== Round 10 ===
Home team	Home team score	Away team	Away team score	Venue	Date
Fitzroy	8.15 (63)	Melbourne	5.5 (35)	Brunswick Street Oval	22 June 1911
Richmond	4.6 (30)	Collingwood	7.8 (50)	Punt Road Oval	22 June 1911
Geelong	8.7 (55)	St Kilda	6.4 (40)	Corio Oval	24 June 1911
Carlton	6.16 (52)	Essendon	5.10 (40)	Princes Park	24 June 1911
University	4.5 (29)	South Melbourne	9.13 (67)	MCG	24 June 1911

=== Round 11 ===
Home team	Home team score	Away team	Away team score	Venue	Date
St Kilda	15.11 (101)	University	6.5 (41)	Junction Oval	1 July 1911
Essendon	7.15 (57)	Richmond	7.5 (47)	EMCG	1 July 1911
Collingwood	9.7 (61)	Fitzroy	10.12 (72)	Victoria Park	1 July 1911
Melbourne	10.7 (67)	Geelong	8.7 (55)	MCG	1 July 1911
South Melbourne	12.8 (80)	Carlton	9.11 (65)	Lake Oval	1 July 1911

=== Round 12 ===
Home team	Home team score	Away team	Away team score	Venue	Date
Essendon	7.15 (57)	Melbourne	6.13 (49)	EMCG	8 July 1911
South Melbourne	12.14 (86)	St Kilda	6.13 (49)	Lake Oval	8 July 1911
University	3.8 (26)	Richmond	6.10 (46)	MCG	8 July 1911
Geelong	6.7 (43)	Collingwood	8.5 (53)	Corio Oval	8 July 1911
Fitzroy	5.13 (43)	Carlton	6.10 (46)	Brunswick Street Oval	8 July 1911

=== Round 13 ===
Home team	Home team score	Away team	Away team score	Venue	Date
Melbourne	7.7 (49)	South Melbourne	9.8 (62)	MCG	15 July 1911
Collingwood	2.11 (23)	Essendon	3.11 (29)	Victoria Park	15 July 1911
Carlton	9.12 (66)	University	2.10 (22)	Princes Park	15 July 1911
Richmond	11.14 (80)	Geelong	8.12 (60)	Punt Road Oval	15 July 1911
St Kilda	3.8 (26)	Fitzroy	12.12 (84)	Junction Oval	15 July 1911

=== Round 14 ===
Home team	Home team score	Away team	Away team score	Venue	Date
Collingwood	5.6 (36)	South Melbourne	5.7 (37)	Victoria Park	22 July 1911
St Kilda	5.9 (39)	Melbourne	11.11 (77)	Junction Oval	22 July 1911
Geelong	10.14 (74)	Fitzroy	6.3 (39)	Corio Oval	22 July 1911
University	6.6 (42)	Essendon	12.8 (80)	MCG	22 July 1911
Richmond	6.5 (41)	Carlton	11.10 (76)	Punt Road Oval	22 July 1911

=== Round 15 ===
Home team	Home team score	Away team	Away team score	Venue	Date
Fitzroy	12.14 (86)	University	7.7 (49)	Brunswick Street Oval	29 July 1911
Essendon	9.7 (61)	Geelong	4.11 (35)	EMCG	29 July 1911
Carlton	18.21 (129)	St Kilda	2.3 (15)	Princes Park	29 July 1911
South Melbourne	8.25 (73)	Richmond	5.7 (37)	Lake Oval	29 July 1911
Melbourne	4.6 (30)	Collingwood	6.16 (52)	MCG	29 July 1911

=== Round 16 ===
Home team	Home team score	Away team	Away team score	Venue	Date
Carlton	11.5 (71)	Geelong	7.9 (51)	Princes Park	19 August 1911
Richmond	7.9 (51)	Melbourne	9.6 (60)	Punt Road Oval	19 August 1911
South Melbourne	5.6 (36)	Fitzroy	4.3 (27)	Lake Oval	19 August 1911
St Kilda	5.8 (38)	Essendon	24.19 (163)	Junction Oval	19 August 1911
University	0.9 (9)	Collingwood	14.14 (98)	MCG	19 August 1911

=== Round 17 ===
Home team	Home team score	Away team	Away team score	Venue	Date
Richmond	17.21 (123)	St Kilda	5.6 (36)	Punt Road Oval	26 August 1911
Melbourne	13.13 (91)	University	4.5 (29)	MCG	26 August 1911
Geelong	10.12 (72)	South Melbourne	10.3 (63)	Corio Oval	26 August 1911
Fitzroy	3.7 (25)	Essendon	6.10 (46)	Brunswick Street Oval	26 August 1911
Collingwood	8.8 (56)	Carlton	4.17 (41)	Victoria Park	26 August 1911

=== Round 18 ===
Home team	Home team score	Away team	Away team score	Venue	Date
Fitzroy	8.9 (57)	Richmond	4.10 (34)	Brunswick Street Oval	2 September 1911
Essendon	9.9 (63)	South Melbourne	8.10 (58)	EMCG	2 September 1911
Carlton	9.8 (62)	Melbourne	8.6 (54)	Princes Park	2 September 1911
University	7.4 (46)	Geelong	15.17 (107)	MCG	2 September 1911
St Kilda	6.8 (44)	Collingwood	15.11 (101)	Junction Oval	2 September 1911

== Ladder ==
(P)	Premiers
	Qualified for finals

#	Team	P	W	L	D	PF	PA	%	Pts
1	Essendon (P)	18	15	2	1	1207	677	178.3	62
2	South Melbourne	18	13	4	1	1143	814	140.4	54
3	Carlton	18	12	4	2	1150	810	142.0	52
4	Collingwood	18	12	6	0	1064	855	124.4	48
5	Fitzroy	18	10	8	0	951	837	113.6	40
6	Geelong	18	8	9	1	1025	1026	99.9	34
7	Melbourne	18	7	10	1	989	1003	98.6	30
8	Richmond	18	7	11	0	931	1021	91.2	28
9	St Kilda	18	2	16	0	699	1454	48.1	8
10	University	18	1	17	0	721	1383	52.1	4

Rules for classification: 1. premiership points; 2. percentage; 3. points for
Average score: 54.9
Source: AFL Tables

== Finals series ==
All of the 1911 finals were played at the MCG so the home team in the semi-finals and Preliminary Final is purely the higher ranked team from the ladder but in the Grand Final the home team was the team that won the Preliminary Final.

=== Semi-finals ===
Home team	Score	Away team	Score	Venue	Date
Collingwood	11.11 (77)	South Melbourne	6.11 (47)	MCG	9 September
Essendon	9.15 (69)	Carlton	6.12 (48)	MCG	16 September

=== Grand final ===
Team	1 Qtr	2 Qtr	3 Qtr	Final
Essendon	2.4	3.9	3.11	5.11 (41)
Collingwood	1.1	1.5	3.8	4.11 (35)

== Season notes ==
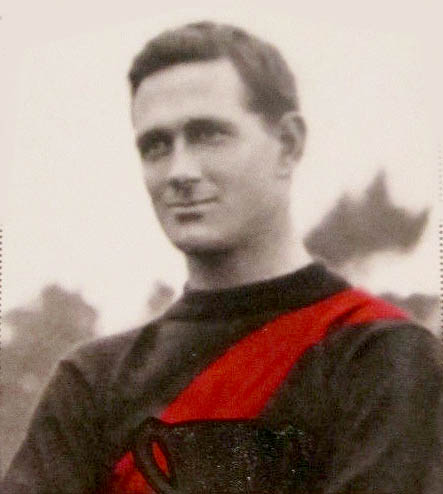
Dave Smith captained Essendon to victory

- In May 1911, after much agitation from the majority of clubs, 16 of the 20 club delegates voted to delete Rule 29 of the VFL constitution, expressly forbidding player payments beyond expenses, which had been added in 1900. It was widely accepted that most clubs had flouted this rule and used creative methods to provide payments. By allowing payments other than reimbursement of expenses to be made to players, this made the competition professional.
  - The four dissenting delegates were from the clubs who remained amateur, Melbourne and University, as both clubs' by-laws at the time stated that any player found to be professional would be immediately expelled.
- In Round 2, Geelong 7.12 (54) controversially tied Melbourne 7.12 (54) apiece, after Bert Whittington (Geelong) took a free kick after the final bell which was touched through the goal face for a behind. Under the rules at the time, the ball should have been declared dead for no score when it was touched; however, umpire Lardie Tulloch had not heard the bell over the crowd and signalled 'all clear' as if the whole passage of play had occurred before the bell. Melbourne lodged a protest against the result, but it was dismissed under a clause which had been newly added to the Laws of the Game prior to the 1911 season to provide clarity in exactly this type of situation, stating "the field umpire shall be the sole judge as to the first sound of the bell," irrespective of the volume of the bell or conduct of the timekeepers.
- In Round 4, Essendon became the first team to score 100 points against Collingwood, which was the last club remaining to have not yet conceded 100 points in a game. Essendon's score of 21.12 (138) was the highest by any club since Round 17, 1901.
- On 20 August, the SAFL Interstate team defeated Victoria 11.11 (77) to 5.4 (34) to win the 1911 Adelaide Carnival.
- In round 9, Fitzroy back-man Bill Marchbanks, a constable with the Victorian Police Force, was refused leave to play for Fitzroy against Richmond and was instead, assigned to the South Melbourne and Essendon match to patrol as a mounted policeman. Near the end of the match, the home crowd roared as South Melbourne suddenly took the lead, causing his horse to rear and throw him against the iron fence. Marchbanks fractured his knee.
- Essendon player Jim Martin received a 12-match suspension for striking Fitzroy player George Holden (see also ) during the round 8 match, despite there being no witnesses who saw Martin throw a punch; it appeared that Holden had thrown himself at Martin, who was stationary and braced himself for the collision. Martin was charged with assault, and was found not guilty on appeal when the case went to the District Court, but the tribunal's suspension cost him a place in Essendon's premiership team.
- From Round 15, St Kilda players went on strike to protest the club committee's barring of former player and captain Joe Hogan and the father of star player Wels Eicke from the club, and the Saints had to use 62 players for the season, the most by any team in the history of the VFL/AFL; due to a series of long-running disputes with the committee, St. Kilda also used 55 players in 1909 and 60 players in 1910. After the strike, the club lost its last four games by an average of 96 points.
- In Round 15, Vin Gardiner of Carlton became only the second player to kick ten goals in a match; his 21 scoring shots (10.11) also set a new record for a single player in a game.
- In Round 16, Essendon scored 24.19 (163) against the strike-affected St Kilda, setting a new record for the highest score in a VFL match and breaking the previous record of 23.24 (162) set by Geelong in 1899.
- In the 1911 finals series, players wore numbers on their backs for the first time in any VFL match played in Melbourne.

== Awards ==
- The 1911 VFL Premiership team was Essendon.
- The VFL's leading goalkicker was Vin Gardiner of Carlton with 47 goals.
- University took the "wooden spoon" in 1911.

== Sources ==
- 1911 VFL season at AFL Tables
- 1911 VFL season at Australian Football
