= Electoral results for the Division of Kooyong =

Australian division election results

This is a list of electoral results for the Division of Kooyong in Australian federal elections from the division's creation in 1901 until the present.

== Members ==
Member	Party	Term
William Knox	Free Trade/Anti-Socialist	1901–1909
William Knox	Liberal	1909–1910
Sir Robert Best	Liberal	1910 by–1917
Sir Robert Best	Nationalist	1917–1922
John Latham	Liberal	1922–1925
John Latham	Nationalist	1925–1931
John Latham	United Australia	1931–1934
(Sir) Robert Menzies	United Australia	1934–1945
(Sir) Robert Menzies	Liberal	1945–1966
Andrew Peacock	Liberal	1966 by–1994
Petro Georgiou	Liberal	1994 by–2010
Josh Frydenberg	Liberal	2010–2022
Monique Ryan	Independent	2022–present

== Election results ==
=== Elections in the 2020s ===
==== 2025 ====
2025 Australian federal election: Kooyong
Party	Candidate	Votes	%	±%
Libertarian	Richard Peppard			
Liberal	Amelia Hamer			
Greens	Jackie Carter			
One Nation	Camille Brache			
Trumpet of Patriots	David Vader			
Independent	Monique Ryan			
Labor	Clive Crosby			
Total formal votes				
Informal votes				
Turnout				

==== 2022 ====
2022 Australian federal election: Kooyong
Party	Candidate	Votes	%	±%
Liberal	Josh Frydenberg	43,736	42.66	−6.51
Independent	Monique Ryan	41,303	40.29	+40.29
Labor	Peter Lynch	7,091	6.92	−10.60
Greens	Piers Mitchem	6,461	6.30	−14.78
Liberal Democrats	Alexandra Thom	1,080	1.05	+1.05
United Australia	Scott Hardiman	1,011	0.99	−0.22
One Nation	Josh Coyne	741	0.72	+0.72
Animal Justice	Rachael Nehmer	500	0.49	−0.65
Independent	Will Anderson	265	0.26	+0.26
Justice	Michele Dale	177	0.17	+0.12
Australian Values	David Connolly	152	0.15	+0.15
Total formal votes		102,517	97.11	+0.08
Informal votes		3,046	2.89	−0.08
Turnout		105,563	93.44	−2.39
Notional two-party-preferred count
Liberal	Josh Frydenberg	55,542	54.18	−2.21
Labor	Peter Lynch	46,975	45.82	+2.21
Two-candidate-preferred result
Independent	Monique Ryan	54,276	52.94	+52.94
Liberal	Josh Frydenberg	48,241	47.06	−8.36
Independent gain from Liberal				

Alluvial diagram for preference flows in the seat of Kooyong in the 2022 federal election. indicates at what stage the winning candidate had over 50% of the votes and was declared the winner.

=== Elections in the 2010s ===
==== 2019 ====
2019 Australian federal election: Kooyong
Party	Candidate	Votes	%	±%
Liberal	Josh Frydenberg	48,928	49.41	−8.24
Greens	Julian Burnside	21,035	21.24	+2.65
Labor	Jana Stewart	16,666	16.83	−3.70
Independent	Oliver Yates	8,890	8.98	+8.98
United Australia	Steven D'Elia	1,185	1.20	+1.20
Animal Justice	Davina Hinkley	1,117	1.13	+1.00
Independent	Bill Chandler	669	0.68	+0.68
Independent	Angelina Zubac	539	0.54	−2.32
Total formal votes		99,029	97.03	−0.97
Informal votes		3,033	2.97	+0.97
Turnout		102,062	94.14	+0.48
Notional two-party-preferred count
Liberal	Josh Frydenberg	56,127	56.68	−6.14
Labor	Jana Stewart	42,902	43.32	+6.14
Two-candidate-preferred result
Liberal	Josh Frydenberg	55,159	55.70	−7.64
Greens	Julian Burnside	43,870	44.30	+44.30
Liberal hold		Swing	N/A	

==== 2016 ====
2016 Australian federal election: Kooyong
Party	Candidate	Votes	%	±%
Liberal	Josh Frydenberg	52,401	58.22	+2.53
Labor	Marg D'Arcy	17,825	19.80	−2.63
Greens	Helen McLeod	17,027	18.92	+2.34
Independent	Angelina Zubac	2,750	3.06	+2.35
Total formal votes		90,003	98.01	+1.40
Informal votes		1,823	1.99	−1.40
Turnout		91,826	91.70	−1.76
Two-party-preferred result
Liberal	Josh Frydenberg	57,007	63.34	+2.28
Labor	Marg D'Arcy	32,996	36.66	−2.28
Liberal hold		Swing	+2.28	

==== 2013 ====
2013 Australian federal election: Kooyong
Party	Candidate	Votes	%	±%
Liberal	Josh Frydenberg	48,802	55.69	+3.20
Labor	John Kennedy	19,655	22.43	−5.12
Greens	Helen McLeod	14,526	16.58	−1.76
Independent	Tiffany Harrison	1,464	1.67	+1.67
Palmer United	Luke McNamara	1,406	1.60	+1.60
Family First	Jaxon Calder	825	0.94	−0.60
Independent	Angelina Zubac	621	0.71	+0.71
Rise Up Australia	Tim Kriedemann	327	0.37	+0.37
Total formal votes		87,626	96.61	−0.61
Informal votes		3,073	3.39	+0.61
Turnout		90,699	93.38	−0.19
Two-party-preferred result
Liberal	Josh Frydenberg	53,504	61.06	+3.61
Labor	John Kennedy	34,122	38.94	−3.61
Liberal hold		Swing	+3.61	

==== 2010 ====
2010 Australian federal election: Kooyong
Party	Candidate	Votes	%	±%
Liberal	Josh Frydenberg	42,728	52.56	−2.58
Labor	Steve Hurd	22,268	27.39	−2.64
Greens	Des Benson	15,019	18.48	+6.66
Family First	John Laidler	1,272	1.56	+0.02
Total formal votes		81,287	97.22	−0.68
Informal votes		2,326	2.78	+0.68
Turnout		83,613	93.26	−1.54
Two-party-preferred result
Liberal	Josh Frydenberg	46,779	57.55	−1.98
Labor	Steve Hurd	34,508	42.45	+1.98
Liberal hold		Swing	−1.98	

=== Elections in the 2000s ===
==== 2007 ====
2007 Australian federal election: Kooyong
Party	Candidate	Votes	%	±%
Liberal	Petro Georgiou	45,172	55.14	+0.48
Labor	Ken Harvey	24,599	30.03	+1.02
Greens	Peter Campbell	9,686	11.82	−0.72
Family First	John Laidler	1,261	1.54	+0.16
Democrats	David Collyer	1,056	1.29	−0.56
Citizens Electoral Council	Pierre Curtis	154	0.19	−0.37
Total formal votes		81,928	97.90	+0.80
Informal votes		1,756	2.10	−0.80
Turnout		83,684	94.75	+0.49
Two-party-preferred result
Liberal	Petro Georgiou	48,775	59.53	−0.05
Labor	Ken Harvey	33,153	40.47	+0.05
Liberal hold		Swing	−0.05	

==== 2004 ====
2004 Australian federal election: Kooyong
Party	Candidate	Votes	%	±%
Liberal	Petro Georgiou	43,581	54.66	−0.42
Labor	Tom Wilson	23,132	29.01	+2.75
Greens	Peter Campbell	9,997	12.54	+1.82
Democrats	Mary Dettman	1,472	1.85	−6.09
Family First	John Laidler	1,099	1.38	+1.38
Citizens Electoral Council	Andrew Reed	446	0.56	+0.56
Total formal votes		79,727	97.10	−0.33
Informal votes		2,380	2.90	+0.33
Turnout		82,107	94.26	−1.26
Two-party-preferred result
Liberal	Petro Georgiou	47,498	59.58	−1.36
Labor	Tom Wilson	32,229	40.42	+1.36
Liberal hold		Swing	−1.36	

==== 2001 ====
2001 Australian federal election: Kooyong
Party	Candidate	Votes	%	±%
Liberal	Petro Georgiou	44,244	55.08	+0.26
Labor	Tom Wilson	21,096	26.26	−3.18
Greens	Peter Campbell	8,607	10.72	+6.67
Democrats	Ari Sharp	6,374	7.94	−0.18
Total formal votes		80,321	97.48	−0.50
Informal votes		2,075	2.52	+0.50
Turnout		82,396	94.86	
Two-party-preferred result
Liberal	Petro Georgiou	48,944	60.94	−0.45
Labor	Tom Wilson	31,377	39.06	+0.45
Liberal hold		Swing	−0.45	

=== Elections in the 1990s ===
==== 1998 ====
1998 Australian federal election: Kooyong
Party	Candidate	Votes	%	±%
Liberal	Petro Georgiou	43,028	54.83	−2.18
Labor	Maxine Morand	23,107	29.44	+2.16
Democrats	Brad Starkie	6,366	8.11	−0.17
Greens	Wendy Salter	3,177	4.05	−0.96
One Nation	Ron McKean	1,637	2.09	+2.09
Unity	Milton Nomikoudis	1,164	1.48	+1.48
Total formal votes		78,479	97.98	−0.03
Informal votes		1,620	2.02	+0.03
Turnout		80,099	95.28	−1.11
Two-party-preferred result
Liberal	Petro Georgiou	48,176	61.39	−2.42
Labor	Maxine Morand	30,303	38.61	+2.42
Liberal hold		Swing	−2.42	

==== 1996 ====
1996 Australian federal election: Kooyong
Party	Candidate	Votes	%	±%
Liberal	Petro Georgiou	44,022	57.00	−3.74
Labor	Christina Sindt	21,070	27.28	−3.29
Democrats	Pierre Harcourt	6,392	8.28	+2.66
Greens	Jane Beer	3,870	5.01	+5.01
Against Further Immigration	Rod Spencer	1,543	2.00	+2.00
Natural Law	Raymond Schlager	330	0.43	−1.34
Total formal votes		77,227	98.00	+0.47
Informal votes		1,573	2.00	−0.47
Turnout		78,800	96.38	+0.59
Two-party-preferred result
Liberal	Petro Georgiou	48,841	63.81	+0.51
Labor	Christina Sindt	27,699	36.19	−0.51
Liberal hold		Swing	+0.51	

==== 1994 by-election ====
1994 Kooyong by-election
Party	Candidate	Votes	%	±%
Liberal	Petro Georgiou	32,872	56.86	−7.27
Greens	Peter Singer	16,202	28.03	+28.03
Against Further Immigration	Angela Walker	4,573	7.91	+7.91
Independent	Yasmin Cotton	2,004	3.47	+3.47
Independent	Gilbert Boffa	955	1.65	+1.65
Imperial British	David Greagg	686	1.19	+1.19
Independent	Paul Francis Tobias	518	0.90	+0.90
Total formal votes		57,810	96.39	−1.08
Informal votes		2,166	3.61	+1.08
Turnout		59 976	82.79	−13.00
Two-candidate-preferred result
Liberal	Petro Georgiou	36,964	64.03	−0.03
Greens	Peter Singer	20,766	35.97	+35.97
Liberal hold		Swing	N/A	

==== 1993 ====
1993 Australian federal election: Kooyong
Party	Candidate	Votes	%	±%
Liberal	Andrew Peacock	42,363	61.13	+3.10
Labor	Wayne Clarke	20,961	30.25	+7.42
Democrats	David Zemdegs	3,780	5.45	−8.34
Natural Law	Christine Harris	1,210	1.75	+1.75
Imperial British	David Greagg	987	1.42	+0.99
Total formal votes		69,301	97.47	+0.26
Informal votes		1,801	2.53	−0.26
Turnout		71,102	95.79	
Two-party-preferred result
Liberal	Andrew Peacock	44,381	64.07	−0.74
Labor	Wayne Clarke	24,893	35.93	+0.74
Liberal hold		Swing	−0.74	

==== 1990 ====
1990 Australian federal election: Kooyong
Party	Candidate	Votes	%	±%
Liberal	Andrew Peacock	39,123	58.0	−1.1
Labor	Eugene O'Sullivan	15,391	22.8	−7.9
Democrats	Jill Leisegang	9,302	13.8	+6.4
Independent	Tim Ferguson	2,471	3.7	+3.7
Against Further Immigration	Arthur Burns	835	1.2	+1.2
Imperial British	David Greagg	292	0.4	+0.4
Total formal votes		67,414	97.2	
Informal votes		1,937	2.8	
Turnout		69,351	94.9	
Two-party-preferred result
Liberal	Andrew Peacock	43,608	64.8	+0.8
Labor	Eugene O'Sullivan	23,682	35.2	−0.8
Liberal hold		Swing	+0.8	

=== Elections in the 1980s ===
==== 1987 ====
1987 Australian federal election: Kooyong
Party	Candidate	Votes	%	±%
Liberal	Andrew Peacock	36,608	59.1	+0.3
Labor	Lindsay Woods	19,030	30.7	−2.6
Democrats	Peter Taft	4,593	7.4	+1.9
Unite Australia	Margaret Cole	1,685	2.7	+1.8
Total formal votes		61,916	95.8	
Informal votes		2,709	4.2	
Turnout		64,625	94.4	
Two-party-preferred result
Liberal	Andrew Peacock	39,647	64.0	+1.0
Labor	Lindsay Woods	22,265	36.0	−1.0
Liberal hold		Swing	+1.0	

==== 1984 ====
1984 Australian federal election: Kooyong
Party	Candidate	Votes	%	±%
Liberal	Andrew Peacock	36,491	58.8	+1.8
Labor	Kate Nash	20,624	33.3	−1.8
Democrats	Russell White	3,385	5.5	−1.7
Democratic Labor	John Mulholland	1,156	1.9	+1.9
Imperial British	David Greagg	351	0.6	+0.6
Total formal votes		62,007	93.8	
Informal votes		4,095	6.2	
Turnout		66,102	94.0	
Two-party-preferred result
Liberal	Andrew Peacock	39,074	63.0	+3.2
Labor	Kate Nash	22,933	37.0	−3.2
Liberal hold		Swing	+3.2	

==== 1983 ====
1983 Australian federal election: Kooyong
Party	Candidate	Votes	%	±%
Liberal	Andrew Peacock	36,297	56.3	−1.3
Labor	Avis Meddings	23,081	35.8	+1.9
Democrats	Keith Bruckner	4,635	7.2	−1.3
Imperial British	David Greagg	434	0.7	+0.7
Total formal votes		64,447	98.2	
Informal votes		1,154	1.8	
Turnout		65,601	94.6	
Two-party-preferred result
Liberal	Andrew Peacock		59.1	−2.0
Labor	Avis Meddings		40.9	+2.0
Liberal hold		Swing	−2.0	

==== 1980 ====
1980 Australian federal election: Kooyong
Party	Candidate	Votes	%	±%
Liberal	Andrew Peacock	38,013	57.6	+2.0
Labor	Wesley Blackmore	22,356	33.9	+8.2
Democrats	James Lysaght	5,630	8.5	−3.9
Total formal votes		65,999	98.2	
Informal votes		1,181	1.8	
Turnout		67,180	93.6	
Two-party-preferred result
Liberal	Andrew Peacock		61.1	−6.6
Labor	Wesley Blackmore		38.9	+6.6
Liberal hold		Swing	−6.6	

=== Elections in the 1970s ===
==== 1977 ====
1977 Australian federal election: Kooyong
Party	Candidate	Votes	%	±%
Liberal	Andrew Peacock	36,791	55.6	−6.0
Labor	John Wilkinson	16,988	25.7	−4.6
Democrats	Michael McBride	8,176	12.4	+12.4
Democratic Labor	Bernie Gaynor	4,209	6.4	+0.5
Total formal votes		66,164	97.9	
Informal votes		1,388	2.1	
Turnout		67,552	93.6	
Two-party-preferred result
Liberal	Andrew Peacock		67.7	−0.2
Labor	John Wilkinson		32.3	+0.2
Liberal hold		Swing	−0.2	

==== 1975 ====
1975 Australian federal election: Kooyong
Party	Candidate	Votes	%	±%
Liberal	Andrew Peacock	35,809	61.6	+6.7
Labor	John Wilkinson	17,620	30.3	−3.9
Democratic Labor	Francis Duffy	3,411	5.9	+0.2
Australia	John Gare	1,283	2.2	−0.8
Total formal votes		58,123	98.5	
Informal votes		907	1.5	
Turnout		59,030	95.5	
Two-party-preferred result
Liberal	Andrew Peacock		67.9	+5.1
Labor	John Wilkinson		32.1	−5.1
Liberal hold		Swing	+5.1	

==== 1974 ====
1974 Australian federal election: Kooyong
Party	Candidate	Votes	%	±%
Liberal	Andrew Peacock	32,086	54.9	+5.3
Labor	Wellington Lee	19,986	34.2	−0.6
Democratic Labor	Francis Duffy	3,334	5.7	−2.5
Australia	Frances Vorrath	1,779	3.0	−2.9
Independent	Ian Channell	1,311	2.2	+0.7
Total formal votes		58,496	98.4	
Informal votes		980	1.6	
Turnout		59,476	94.4	
Two-party-preferred result
Liberal	Andrew Peacock		62.8	+3.8
Labor	Wellington Lee		37.2	−3.8
Liberal hold		Swing	+3.8	

==== 1972 ====
1972 Australian federal election: Kooyong
Party	Candidate	Votes	%	±%
Liberal	Andrew Peacock	27,104	49.6	−4.7
Labor	Clive Lipshut	19,039	34.8	+1.9
Democratic Labor	Francis Duffy	4,465	8.2	−4.6
Australia	Pamela Thornley	3,237	5.9	+5.9
Independent	Ian Channell	807	1.5	+1.5
Total formal votes		54,652	97.8	
Informal votes		1,219	2.2	
Turnout		55,871	95.0	
Two-party-preferred result
Liberal	Andrew Peacock		59.0	−5.9
Labor	Clive Lipshut		41.0	+5.9
Liberal hold		Swing	−5.9	

=== Elections in the 1960s ===
==== 1969 ====
1969 Australian federal election: Kooyong
Party	Candidate	Votes	%	±%
Liberal	Andrew Peacock	29,076	54.3	−4.0
Labor	Richard Dunstan	17,591	32.9	+3.7
Democratic Labor	Francis Duffy	6,856	12.8	+0.3
Total formal votes		53,523	97.8	
Informal votes		1,185	2.2	
Turnout		54,708	93.6	
Two-party-preferred result
Liberal	Andrew Peacock		64.9	−4.7
Labor	Richard Dunstan		35.1	+4.7
Liberal hold		Swing	−4.7	

==== 1966 ====
1966 Australian federal election: Kooyong
Party	Candidate	Votes	%	±%
Liberal	Andrew Peacock	28,760	61.2	−2.7
Labor	William Cooper	12,370	26.3	+1.9
Democratic Labor	Bernie Gaynor	5,888	12.5	+2.3
Total formal votes		47,018	97.9	
Informal votes		1,031	2.1	
Turnout		48,049	95.9	
Two-party-preferred result
Liberal	Andrew Peacock		72.5	−1.6
Labor	William Cooper		27.5	+1.6
Liberal hold		Swing	−1.6	

==== 1966 by-election ====
1966 Kooyong by-election
Party	Candidate	Votes	%	±%
Liberal	Andrew Peacock	25,012	56.8	−7.1
Labor	William Cooper	12,181	27.7	+3.3
Democratic Labor	Bernie Gaynor	5,854	13.3	+3.1
Independent	Peter Brereton	781	1.8	+1.8
Republican	Charles Cook	220	0.5	+0.5
Total formal votes		4,048	98.0	
Informal votes		900	2.0	
Turnout		44,948	90.0	
Two-party-preferred result
Liberal	Andrew Peacock	30,569	69.4	−4.7
Labor	William Cooper	13,478	30.6	+4.7
Liberal hold		Swing	−4.7	

==== 1963 ====
1963 Australian federal election: Kooyong
Party	Candidate	Votes	%	±%
Liberal	Sir Robert Menzies	30,205	63.9	+6.6
Labor	Robert White	11,514	24.4	−1.6
Democratic Labor	Charles Murphy	4,806	10.2	−5.0
Communist	Ralph Gibson	727	1.5	+0.5
Total formal votes		47,252	98.9	
Informal votes		513	1.1	
Turnout		47,765	95.9	
Two-party-preferred result
Liberal	Sir Robert Menzies		74.1	+3.7
Labor	Robert White		25.9	−3.7
Liberal hold		Swing	+3.7	

==== 1961 ====
1961 Australian federal election: Kooyong
Party	Candidate	Votes	%	±%
Liberal	Robert Menzies	26,328	57.3	−6.1
Labor	Moss Cass	11,938	26.0	+3.8
Democratic Labor	Thomas Brennan	6,968	15.2	+1.8
Communist	Bill Tregear	458	1.0	−0.1
Independent	Goldie Collins	237	0.5	+0.5
Total formal votes		45,929	97.8	
Informal votes		1,043	2.2	
Turnout		46,972	95.3	
Two-party-preferred result
Liberal	Robert Menzies		70.4	−4.3
Labor	Moss Cass		29.6	+4.3
Liberal hold		Swing	−4.3	

=== Elections in the 1950s ===
==== 1958 ====
1958 Australian federal election: Kooyong
Party	Candidate	Votes	%	±%
Liberal	Robert Menzies	28,285	63.4	−3.2
Labor	Dolph Eddy	9,921	22.2	+0.2
Democratic Labor	John Buchanan	5,962	13.4	+3.1
Communist	Gerry O'Day	476	1.1	−0.1
Total formal votes		44,644	98.1	
Informal votes		882	1.9	
Turnout		45,526	95.5	
Two-party-preferred result
Liberal	Robert Menzies		74.7	−0.2
Labor	Dolph Eddy		25.3	+0.2
Liberal hold		Swing	−0.2	

==== 1955 ====
1955 Australian federal election: Kooyong
Party	Candidate	Votes	%	±%
Liberal	Robert Menzies	28,363	66.6	−2.7
Labor	Dolph Eddy	9,350	22.0	−6.9
Labor (A-C)	Kevin Gregson	4,371	10.3	+10.3
Communist	Gerry O'Day	507	1.2	−0.6
Total formal votes		42,591	98.0	
Informal votes		855	2.0	
Turnout		43,446	95.0	
Two-party-preferred result
Liberal	Robert Menzies		74.9	+5.5
Labor	Dolph Eddy		25.1	−5.5
Liberal hold		Swing	+5.5	

==== 1954 ====
1954 Australian federal election: Kooyong
Party	Candidate	Votes	%	±%
Liberal	Robert Menzies	29,427	69.3	+1.9
Labor	George Miller	12,269	28.9	+0.5
Communist	Rex Mortimer	763	1.8	−2.4
Total formal votes		42,459	99.1	
Informal votes		398	0.9	
Turnout		42,857	95.7	
Two-party-preferred result
Liberal	Robert Menzies		69.5	+0.7
Labor	George Miller		30.5	−0.7
Liberal hold		Swing	+0.7	

==== 1951 ====
1951 Australian federal election: Kooyong
Party	Candidate	Votes	%	±%
Liberal	Robert Menzies	28,174	67.4	+0.3
Labor	Maurice Sheehy	11,873	28.4	−4.5
Communist	Ted Laurie	1,734	4.2	+4.2
Total formal votes		41,781	98.8	
Informal votes		516	1.2	
Turnout		42,297	96.2	
Two-party-preferred result
Liberal	Robert Menzies		68.8	+1.7
Labor	Maurice Sheehy		31.2	−1.7
Liberal hold		Swing	+1.7	

=== Elections in the 1940s ===
==== 1949 ====
1949 Australian federal election: Kooyong
Party	Candidate	Votes	%	±%
Liberal	Robert Menzies	27,912	67.1	+4.8
Labor	Keith Ewert	13,691	32.9	+1.3
Total formal votes		41,603	98.9	
Informal votes		463	1.1	
Turnout		42,066	97.2	
Liberal hold		Swing	+4.2	

==== 1946 ====
1946 Australian federal election: Kooyong
Party	Candidate	Votes	%	±%
Liberal	Robert Menzies	49,298	61.7	+13.1
Labor	Albert Nicholls	25,494	31.9	+5.2
Communist	Ted Laurie	5,134	6.4	−1.8
Total formal votes		79,926	98.4	
Informal votes		1,299	1.6	
Turnout		81,225	93.7	
Two-party-preferred result
Liberal	Robert Menzies		63.3	+0.8
Labor	Albert Nicholls		36.7	−0.8
Liberal hold		Swing	+0.8	

==== 1943 ====
1943 Australian federal election: Kooyong
Party	Candidate	Votes	%	±%
United Australia	Robert Menzies	37,988	48.6	−14.3
Labor	Albert Nicholls	20,912	26.7	+6.1
Middle Class	John Nimmo	10,601	13.5	+13.5
Communist	Ted Laurie	6,402	8.2	+8.2
Christian Independent	Gwendolyn Noad	2,338	3.0	+3.0
Total formal votes		78,241	98.0	
Informal votes		1,599	2.0	
Turnout		79,840	97.2	
Two-party-preferred result
United Australia	Robert Menzies		62.5	−7.6
Labor	Albert Nicholls		37.5	+7.6
United Australia hold		Swing	−7.6	

==== 1940 ====
1940 Australian federal election: Kooyong
Party	Candidate	Votes	%	±%
United Australia	Robert Menzies	44,161	62.9	+11.6
Labor	Thomas Brennan	14,467	20.6	−4.1
Independent	John Dale	7,382	10.5	+10.5
Independent	Drysdale Bett	2,598	3.7	+3.7
Independent	Frank Hartnett	1,168	1.7	+1.7
Independent	Francis Foster	377	0.5	+0.5
Total formal votes		70,153	98.3	
Informal votes		1,184	1.7	
Turnout		71,337	95.3	
Two-party-preferred result
United Australia	Robert Menzies		70.1	+12.8
Labor	Thomas Brennan		29.9	−12.8
United Australia hold		Swing	+12.8	

=== Elections in the 1930s ===
==== 1937 ====
1937 Australian federal election: Kooyong
Party	Candidate	Votes	%	±%
United Australia	Robert Menzies	31,690	51.3	−11.4
Labor	Thomas Brennan	15,247	24.7	+6.6
Independent	Leslie Hollins	14,841	24.0	+24.0
Total formal votes		61,778	97.9	
Informal votes		1,326	2.1	
Turnout		63,104	95.6	
Two-party-preferred result
United Australia	Robert Menzies		57.3	−15.0
Labor	Thomas Brennan		42.7	+15.0
United Australia hold		Swing	−15.0	

==== 1934 ====
1934 Australian federal election: Kooyong
Party	Candidate	Votes	%	±%
United Australia	Robert Menzies	41,876	61.7	−14.8
Labor	Maurice Kelly	13,051	19.2	−4.3
Social Credit	Leslie Hollins	12,980	19.1	+19.1
Total formal votes		67,907	97.2	
Informal votes		1,946	2.8	
Turnout		69,853	95.3	
Two-party-preferred result
United Australia	Robert Menzies		70.8	−5.7
Labor	Maurice Kelly		29.2	+5.7
United Australia hold		Swing	−5.7	

==== 1931 ====
1931 Australian federal election: Kooyong
Party	Candidate	Votes	%	±%
United Australia	John Latham	50,590	76.5	+21.3
Labor	Cornelius Loughnan	15,557	23.5	−21.3
Total formal votes		66,147	98.2	
Informal votes		1,221	1.8	
Turnout		67,368	96.7	
United Australia hold		Swing	+21.3	

=== Elections in the 1920s ===
==== 1929 ====
1929 Australian federal election: Kooyong
Party	Candidate	Votes	%	±%
Nationalist	John Latham	34,909	55.2	−11.3
Labor	Albert Langker	28,276	44.8	+11.3
Total formal votes		63,185	98.6	
Informal votes		898	1.4	
Turnout		64,083	95.4	
Nationalist hold		Swing	−11.3	

==== 1928 ====
1928 Australian federal election: Kooyong
Party	Candidate	Votes	%	±%
Nationalist	John Latham	39,988	66.5	−1.2
Labor	Joseph Hannan	20,124	33.5	+1.2
Total formal votes		60,112	97.1	
Informal votes		1,773	2.9	
Turnout		61,885	95.5	
Nationalist hold		Swing	−1.2	

==== 1925 ====
1925 Australian federal election: Kooyong
Party	Candidate	Votes	%	±%
Nationalist	John Latham	36,954	67.7	+20.3
Labor	Lionel Batten	17,664	32.3	+13.5
Total formal votes		54,618	98.7	
Informal votes		745	1.3	
Turnout		55,363	94.5	
Nationalist hold		Swing	+18.3	

==== 1922 ====
1922 Australian federal election: Kooyong
Party	Candidate	Votes	%	±%
Nationalist	Sir Robert Best	13,459	47.4	−15.1
Liberal	John Latham	9,591	33.8	+33.8
Labor	Jean Daley	5,341	18.8	+0.0
Total formal votes		28,391	97.8	
Informal votes		629	2.2	
Turnout		29,020	61.9	
Two-party-preferred result
Liberal	John Latham	14,360	50.6	+50.6
Nationalist	Sir Robert Best	14,031	49.4	−14.9
Liberal gain from Nationalist		Swing	+14.9	

=== Elections in the 1910s ===
==== 1919 ====
1919 Australian federal election: Kooyong
Party	Candidate	Votes	%	±%
Nationalist	Sir Robert Best	22,732	62.5	−37.5
Ind. Nationalist	Stephen Thompson	7,025	19.3	+19.3
Labor	Mary Grant	6,589	18.1	+18.1
Total formal votes		36,346	96.5	
Informal votes		1,331	3.5	
Turnout		37,677	76.6	
Two-party-preferred result
Nationalist	Sir Robert Best		64.3	−35.7
Ind. Nationalist	Stephen Thompson		35.7	+35.7
Nationalist hold		Swing	−35.7	

==== 1917 ====
1917 Australian federal election: Kooyong
Party	Candidate	Votes	%	±%
Nationalist	Sir Robert Best	unopposed		
Nationalist hold		Swing		

==== 1914 ====
1914 Australian federal election: Kooyong
Party	Candidate	Votes	%	±%
Liberal	Sir Robert Best	18,545	59.4	−2.5
Independent Socialist	Vida Goldstein	10,264	32.9	−5.2
Independent	Edward Terry	2,420	7.7	+7.7
Total formal votes		31,229	98.0	
Informal votes		636	2.0	
Turnout		31,865	76.3	
Liberal hold		Swing	+1.4	

==== 1913 ====
1913 Australian federal election: Kooyong
Party	Candidate	Votes	%	±%
Liberal	Sir Robert Best	18,777	61.9	+4.1
Independent	Vida Goldstein	11,540	38.1	+38.1
Total formal votes		30,317	98.3	
Informal votes		509	1.7	
Turnout		30,826	74.7	
Liberal hold		Swing	+4.1	

==== 1910 by-election ====
1910 Kooyong by-election
Party	Candidate	Votes	%	±%
Liberal	Sir Robert Best	11,925	55.5	−0.8
Independent Liberal	Alfred Lumsden	8,214	38.2	−5.5
Labour	Leger Erson	1,363	6.3	+6.3
Total formal votes		21,502	98.8	
Informal votes		253	1.2	
Turnout		21,755	56.7	
Liberal hold		Swing	+2.4	

==== 1910 ====
1910 Australian federal election: Kooyong
Party	Candidate	Votes	%	±%
Liberal	William Knox	15,089	56.3	−37.1
Independent Liberal	Alfred Lumsden	11,733	43.7	+43.7
Total formal votes		26,822	99.1	
Informal votes		253	0.9	
Turnout		27,075	71.1	
Liberal hold		Swing	−37.1	

=== Elections in the 1900s ===
==== 1906 ====
1906 Australian federal election: Kooyong
Party	Candidate	Votes	%	±%
Anti-Socialist	William Knox	12,018	58.7	+5.9
Protectionist	Robert Barbour	7,093	34.7	−12.5
Labour	Edward Hodges	1,358	6.6	+6.6
Total formal votes		20,469	96.8	
Informal votes		676	3.2	
Turnout		21,145	62.8	
Anti-Socialist hold		Swing	+9.2	

==== 1903 ====
1903 Australian federal election: Kooyong
Party	Candidate	Votes	%	±%
Free Trade	William Knox	12,045	52.8	−4.6
Protectionist	Robert Barbour	10,768	47.2	+13.7
Total formal votes		22,813	98.4	
Informal votes		366	1.6	
Turnout		23,179	58.9	
Free Trade hold		Swing	−9.2	

==== 1901 ====
1901 Australian federal election: Kooyong
Party	Candidate	Votes	%	±%
Free Trade	William Knox	5,193	57.4	+57.4
Protectionist	Theodore Fink	3,026	33.5	+33.5
Ind. Protectionist	John Rogers	821	9.1	+9.1
Total formal votes		9,040	99.5	
Informal votes		45	0.5	
Turnout		9,085	66.4	
Free Trade win		(new seat)		

== Graphical Representation ==
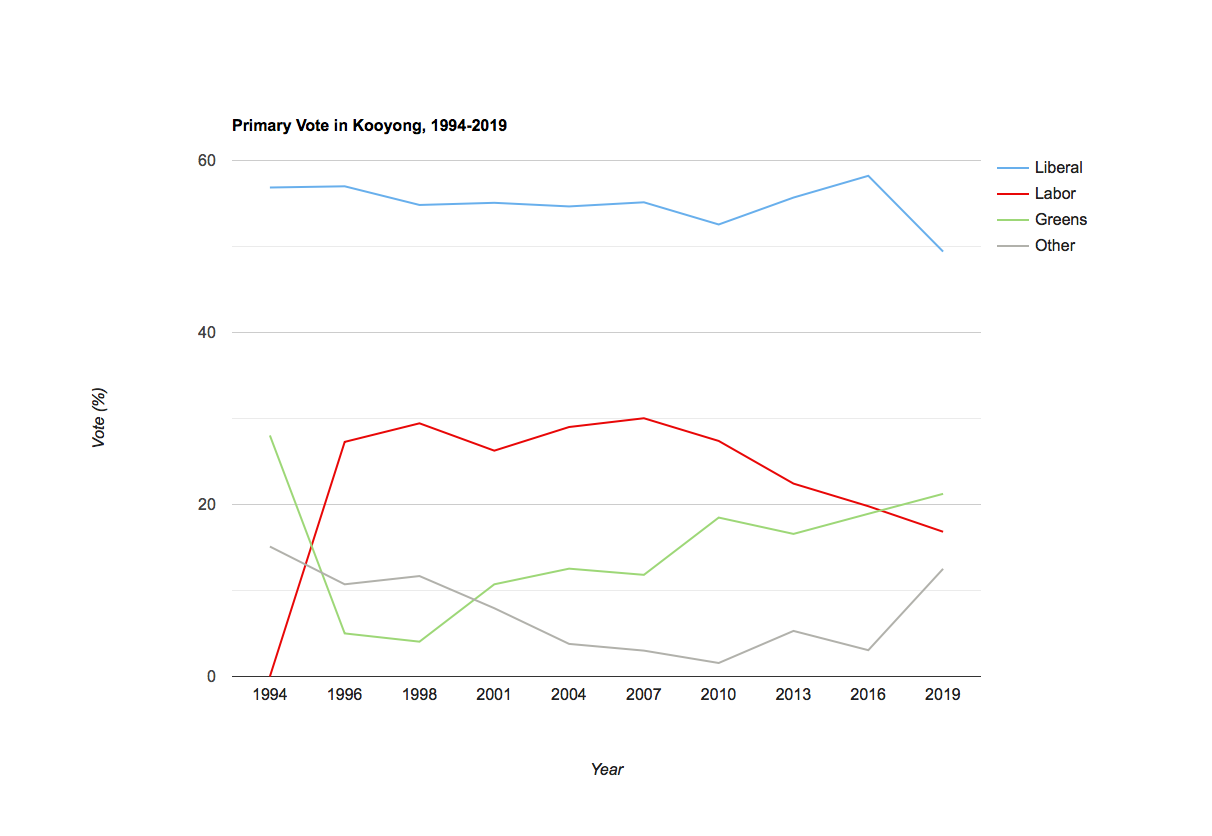
Graphical depiction of primary votes in Kooyong, 1994–2019.
