= Toorak =

- Suburb
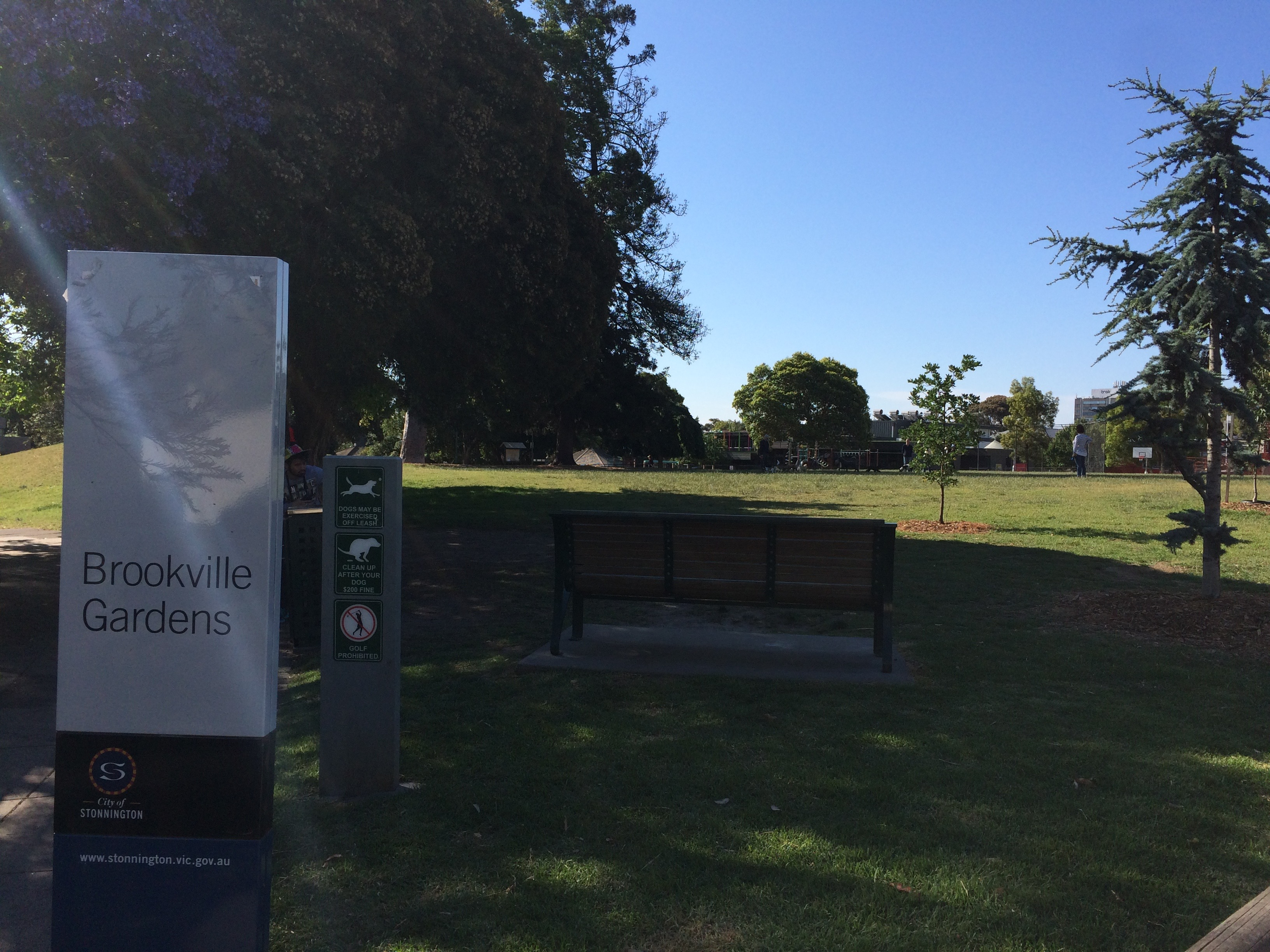
- Brookville Gardens, Toorak

- Interactive map of Toorak
- Coordinates: 37.841°S 145.018°E
- Country: Australia
- State: Victoria
- City: Melbourne
- LGA: City of Stonnington
- Location: 5 km (3.1 mi) from Melbourne
- Established: 1850s

Government
  - State electorate: Malvern
  - Federal division: Kooyong

Area
  - Total: 4.3 km^{2} (1.7 sq mi)
- Elevation: 32 m (105 ft)

Population
  - Total: 12,817 (2021 census)
  - Density: 2,980/km^{2} (7,720/sq mi)
- Postcode: 3142
Suburbs around Toorak
Richmond	Burnley	Hawthorn
South Yarra	Toorak	Kooyong
Prahran	Armadale	Malvern

Toorak (/ˈtuːræk/) is an inner suburb of Melbourne, Victoria, Australia, 5 km (3.1 mi) south-east of the Melbourne central business district, located within the City of Stonnington local government area. Toorak recorded a population of 12,817 at the 2021 census.

The name Toorak has become synonymous with wealth and privilege, the suburb long having the reputation of being Melbourne's most elite, and ranking among the most prestigious in Australia. It has the highest average property values in Melbourne, and is one of the most expensive suburbs in Australia. In early 2025, Toorak's Coonac estate was sold for $124 million, setting a record for the most expensive house ever sold in Australia. It is the nation's second-highest-earning postcode, trailing the Melbourne seaside suburb of Portsea, which ranks first nationally.

Located on a rise on the south side (or left bank) of a bend in the Yarra River, Toorak is bordered by South Yarra, at Williams Road on the west, Malvern, at Glenferrie Road on the east, Prahran and Armadale, at Malvern Road to the south and the suburbs of Richmond, Burnley and Hawthorn on the north side of the river. The suburb's main street is considered to be Toorak Road, on which the commercial area of Toorak Village is located.

== History ==
=== Toponymy ===
Toorak was named after Toorak House, an Italianate residence built in 1849 by merchant James Jackson. The name of the house may have originated from the Woiwurrung language of the indigenous inhabitants, with words of similar pronunciation meaning "black crow" or "reedy swamp".

=== Toorak House ===
From 1854 Toorak House served as the residence of the first Governor of Victoria, Captain Sir Charles Hotham KCB RN and his successors, until the completion of the present Government House (1876) in the Kings Domain.

Toorak Post Office opened around June 1858.

=== 1880s land boom ===
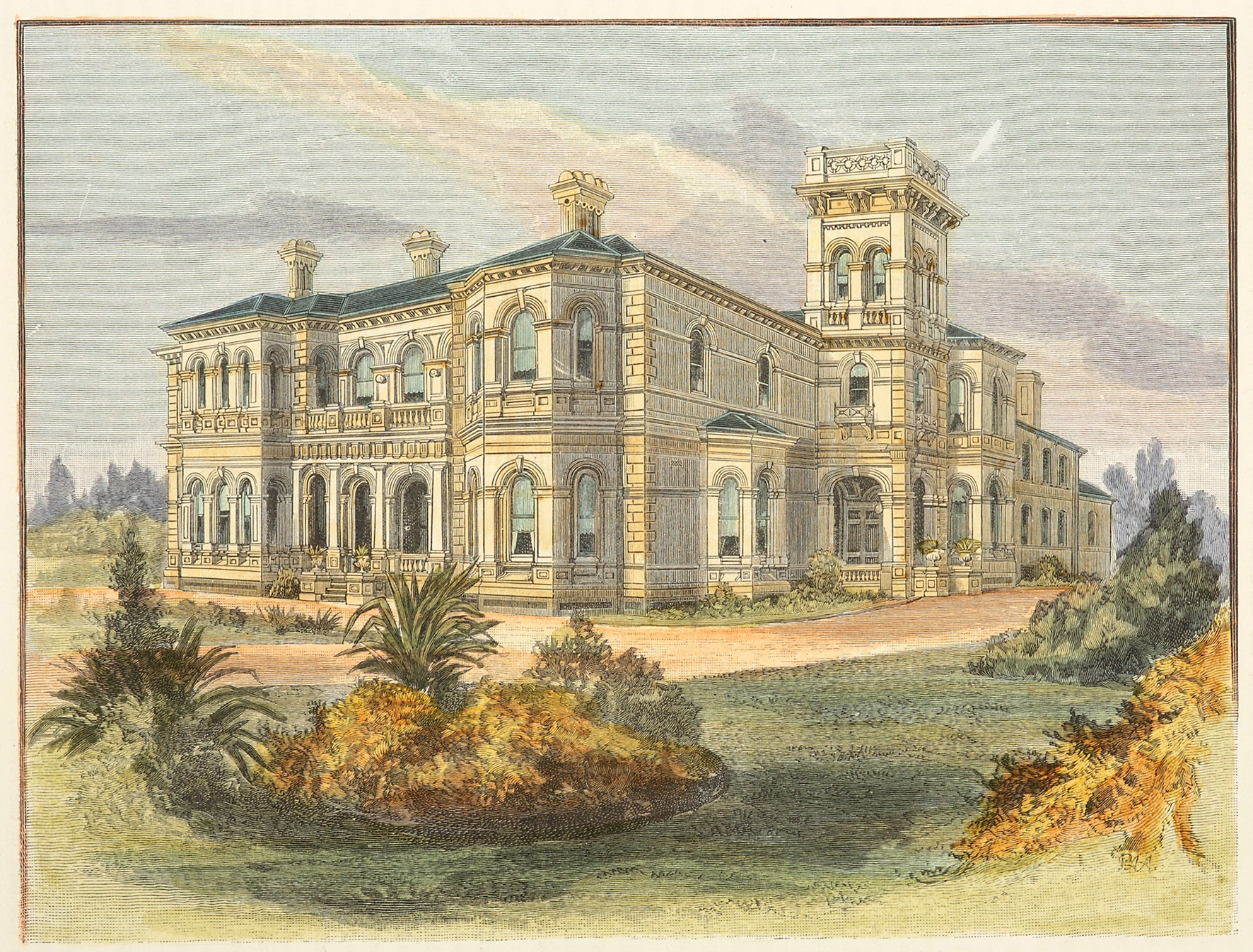
"Wombalano", a thirty-room mansion built by John Munro Bruce in the 1880s

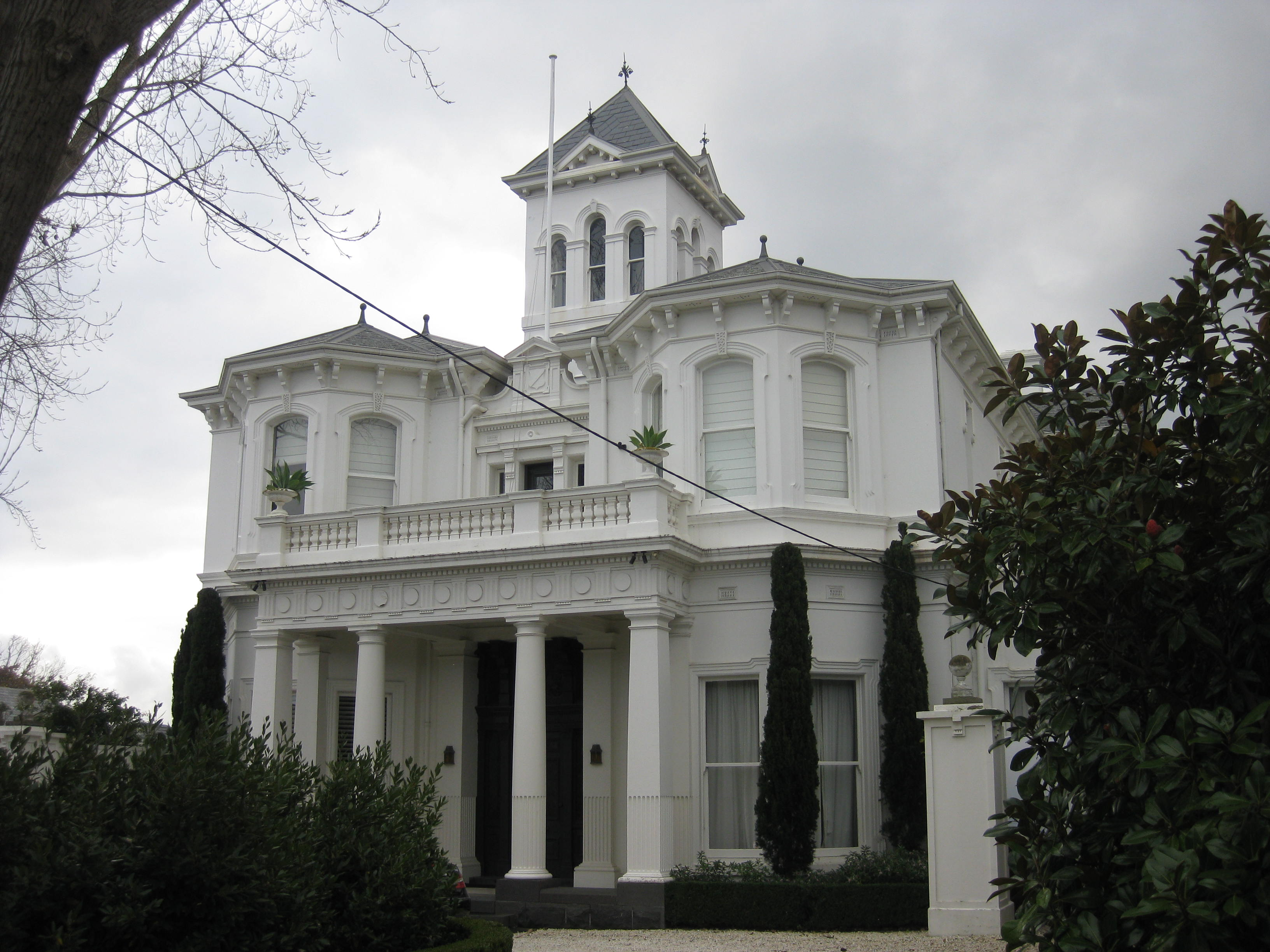
"Chastelton", characteristic of many 1880s Victorian houses built in the area

During the land boom of the 1880s, many large and elaborate mansions were erected in Toorak, often in the Italianate style. Following East Melbourne and then St Kilda, Toorak, along with Brighton, became the new favored location for the wealthy.

=== 1890s depression ===
The suburb was hit particularly hard by the 1890s economic depression and many wealthy landowners declared bankruptcy and were forced to sell. Nonetheless, the suburb remained and is still Melbourne's home of "old money". During the Interwar period, many houses were built in the Tudor revival style; many houses were also designed by society Architect Marcus Martin in the Moderne style over a Georgian building form.

=== Post-war era ===
In the period of post-World War II prosperity, rising standards of living and land values caused Toorak to become highly sought after by a new generation of the wealthy, thought by some to be social climbers and nouveau riche. For some of these people, the focus was simply to have the postcode of Toorak, which was SE 2 and now 3142. As a result, many of the larger mansions were demolished and large holdings were subdivided to make way for flats, townhouses and apartments.

In the 1980s, larger houses in Neo-Georgian and Neo-Classical styles began to appear.

=== Contemporary Toorak ===
While large mansions have survived in neighbouring Hawthorn, Kew and Armadale, only a few of the original 19th-century mansions in Toorak remain, due in part to the high land value. Two of the most notable are Illawarra House, which was acquired by the National Trust; and Coonac, the most expensive house in Melbourne. In Toorak, some of the old property names live on as street names or the names of blocks of flats, carved out of or built on their sites; Dunraven Avenue, Millicent Avenue, Iona Avenue, Woorigoleen Road, Myoora Road, and Scotsburn Grove are examples.

== Demographics ==
In the 2016 census, there were 12,909 people in Toorak.

- 63.9% of people were born in Australia. The next most common countries of birth were China (excludes SARs and Taiwan) 3.6%, England 3.1%, New Zealand 2.2%, India 1.8% and Malaysia 1.2%.
- 73.7% of people spoke only English at home. Other languages spoken at home included Mandarin 4.5%, Cantonese 1.8%, Italian 1.4%, Greek 1.3% and French 0.9%.
- The most common responses for religion were no religion 30.9%, Catholic 17.6% and Anglican 14.9%,
- Of the employed people in Toorak, 4.0% worked in legal services. Other major industries of employment included hospitals 3.7%, real estate services 3.1%, general practice medical services 2.9% and clothing retailing 2.7%.
- The proportion of Toorak residents with a Bachelor's degree or higher is 46.7%.
- The median age is 47.

=== Housing ===
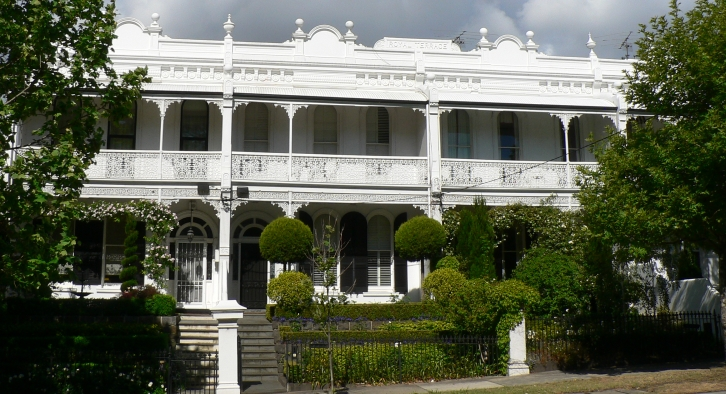
Victorian terrace housing (b. 1880s) in Williams Road

Toorak has an unusual mix of high-, low- and medium-density housing, due to intense subdivision of larger lots in the 1880s, 1920s and 1960s. The predominant housing in Toorak (49.6%) is apartments, particularly walk-up flats.

Single-family detached homes are also prevalent (30.2%). Some of these homes are in the form of traditional mansions or newer large residences on significant-sized estates, owned by Melbourne's wealthy and social elite. The architectural style of the mansions is predominantly Italianate and colonial. There are also extant stands of semi-detached housing (20.1%), including terraces, which were traditionally fashionable with the middle class and later gentrified.

== Heritage listings ==
Likewise to the surrounding suburbs, Toorak has had a long and storied social and architectural history, resulting in a number of heritage places, including (but not limited too):

State significance:

- Brett House, Buddle Drive (VHR H2396), is a postwar Modernist residence constructed in 1955 to the designs of Robin Boyd. A unique postwar interpretation of Georgian architecture.
- Caringal Flats, Tahara Road (VHR H0579), is a postwar Modernist flats building constructed in 1951 to the designs of John William Rivett. An early demonstration of postwar Modernist architecture, the building features two buildings, one curved with three-storeys and twelve flats, and the other is a six storey tower with twelve flats, for a total of twenty-four flats.
- Cranlana, Clendon Road (VHR H1293), is a residence owned by businessman and philanthropist Sidney Myer, best known for founding Myer. Myer purchased Cranlana (which was constructed around 1903) in 1921, who remodelled the residence between 1929-30 to the designs of H W and F P Tompkins, and features a large gardens and strong axial landscape designs.
- Illawarra, Illawarra Court (VHR H0701), is a Victorian mansion, grandiose in scale and flamboyant in decoration, constructed in 1889-91 for land speculator Charles Henry James, in the Italianate style.
- Roy Grounds House, Hill Street (VHR H1963), is a postwar Modernist residence constructed in 1953 to the designs of Roy Grounds, as a personal residence. The residence won the Victorian Architecture Medal in 1954, and features a central courtyard with circular glass walls. In addition, four flats are located behind the residence, and features mixture of a single studio and three larger, double-storey two bedroom units, all with courtyard gardens.
- Toorak House, St. Georges Road (VHR H0207), is an early Victorian mansion constructed in 1849 for Melbourne merchant James Jackson by Samuel Jackson, in the Victorian Italianate style. During its history, Toorak House served as Melbourne's first Government House between 1854 and 1876, before the current Government House was finished in 1876. Today, Toorak House is owned by the Church of Sweden abroad.
- Trawalla, Lascelles Avenue (VHR H0209), is a two-storey Victorian mansion constructed in 1867-68 for Melbourne merchants George Stevenson, in the Victorian Italianate style. The mansion was enlarged to 50 rooms for retired pastoralist John Simpson of Trawalla, near Beaufort in 1885. The estate was subdivided in the 1930s, which formed the current allotment seen today.

Local significance:

- Carmel, Mathoura Road (HO573, Stonnington Planning Scheme), is a two-storey Victorian villa constructed in 1888-89 to the designs of Arthur Edward Clarke, in the Medieval Free style, for politician John Rogers, who served as the Member of the Victorian Legislative Assembly for the Electoral district of South Yarra between 1894 and 1897.
- Carnegie House, Grant Avenue (HO491, Stonnington Planning Scheme), is a two-storey Interwar Georgian Revival residence constructed in 1936 to the designs of Yuncken, Freeman & Griffiths.
- Gelbart House, Heyington Place (HO733, Stonnington Planning Scheme), is a single-storey postwar Modernist constructed in 1971-72 to the designs of Holgar & Holgar.
- Heyington Gardens, Theodore Court (HO735, Stonnington Planning Scheme), is a postwar Modernist flats building constructed in 1962 to the designs of Ernest Fooks.
- Kinkell, Lansell Road (HO630, Stonnington Planning Scheme), is a two-storey Federation bungalow constructed in 1916 to the designs of Christopher Cowper.
- Telgai House, Struan Street (HO168, Stonnington Planning Scheme), is a two-storey residence constructed in 1923 to the designs of Robert Hamilton, with a later addition constructed in 1932. Bell served as a Councillor for the City of Prahran, and later served as the Member of the Victorian Legislative Assembly for the state Electoral district of Toorak from 1945 until his death in 1948.

== Politics ==
Toorak falls within the federal electorate of Kooyong since the 2025 Australian Federal Election, having been previously located in the federal electorate of Higgins (until its abolition in 2025). The seat of Kooyong was created in 1901 and was held by notable Liberal members including former Prime Minister Sir Robert Menzies 1934-1966, Andrew Peacock 1966-1994 and Josh Frydenberg 2010-2022. In the 2022 Federal Election, the seat fell to teal independent Monique Ryan, marking the first time since Federation that the seat had not been held by the Liberal Party or its predecessors.

At state level, it falls within the electorate of Malvern (currently held by the Liberals' Michael O'Brien) since the 2006 Victorian State Election. At local council level, Toorak falls within the City of Stonnington.

Toorak has historically voted for conservative political parties. The Liberal Party retained the seat of Malvern in the 2022 state election, with a 2% swing towards O'Brien.

== Toorak Village ==
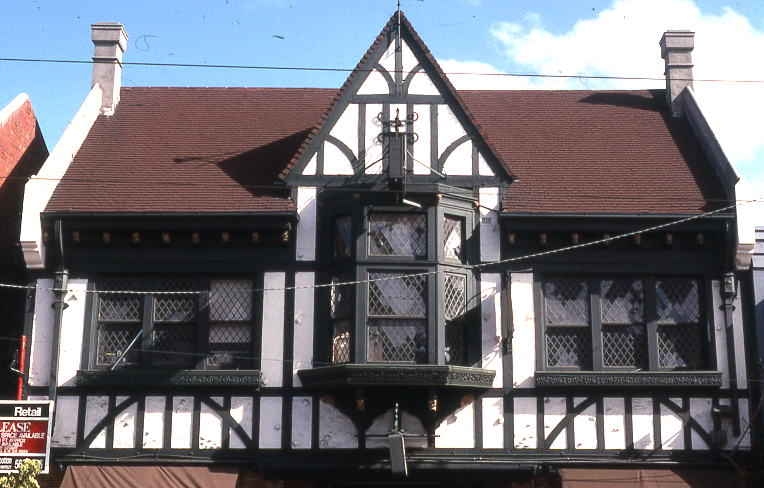
A mock-Tudor shop in Toorak Village

The Toorak Village features a number of shops, restaurants and cafes, located centrally in Toorak Road. Recent mixed-use developments including St. Germain, have increased the number of offices within Toorak Village.

== Places of worship ==
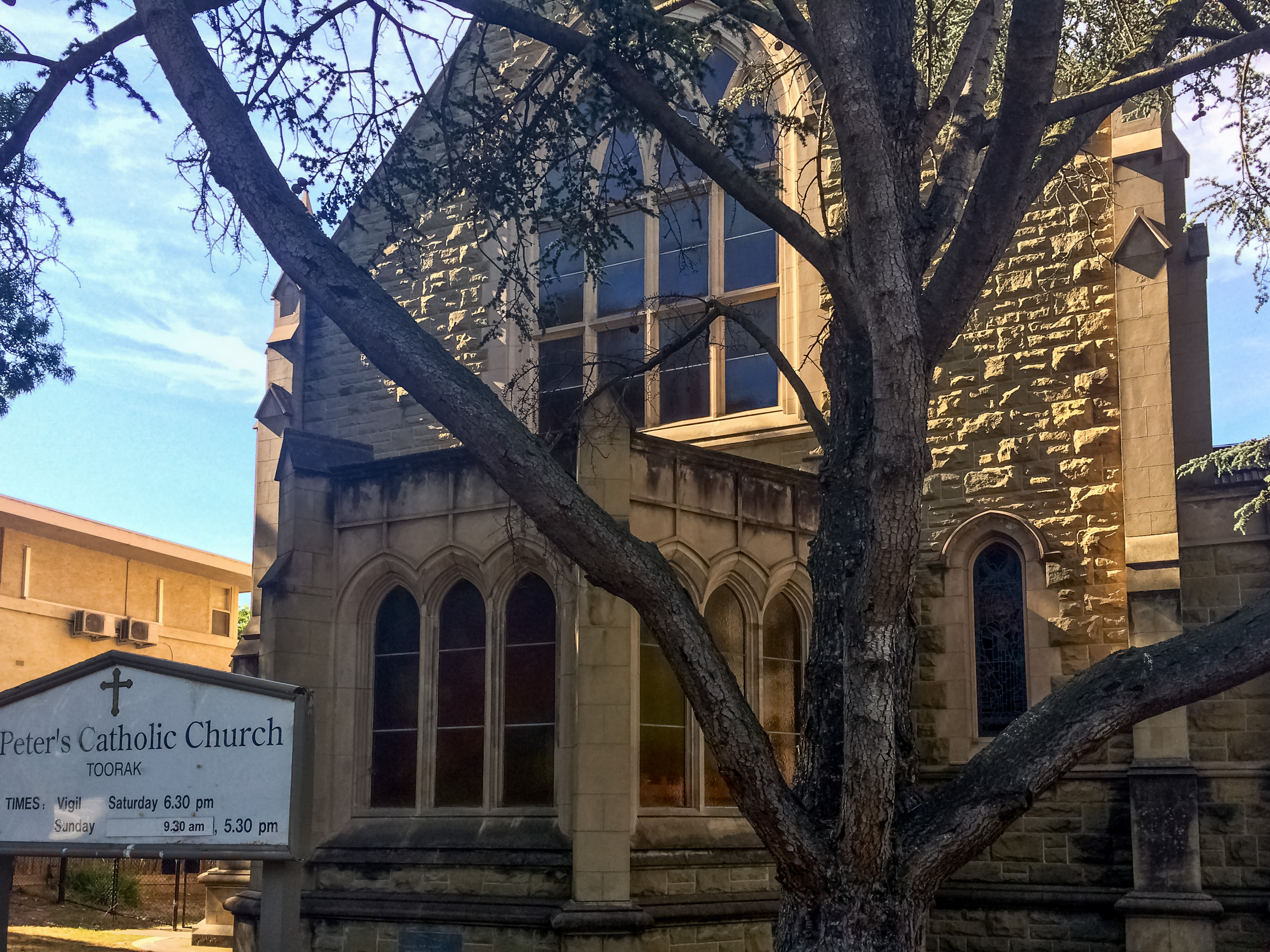
St Peters Church Toorak

- Saint John's Anglican Church, an 1862 Gothic Revival bluestone church, designed by William Wardell, dominates the skyline of Toorak, with a large tower including a peal of bells and a distinctive sandstone broach spire. The church was formally established at a meeting held on 21 November 1859. Those present were Messrs Alfred Ross, H. W. Dauglish, J. Goodman, Allan Spowers, John Steavenson, Jas Blackwood, J. Quarterman, W. M. Hammill, H. W. Farrar, George Hull, Captain Sawell, W. T. Wood, P. Gunning, E. Davis, J. Slater, G. Guillaume and son. Construction began in April 1860, and was completed on 23 October 1860. The ground for the church buildings was selected by Bishop Parry at what was the entrance to the Orrong Estate, which was the property of Mr Alfred Ross. The foundation stone was laid by the Governor, Sir Henry Barkly. Saint John's, Toorak is one of the most popular wedding venue churches in Australia.
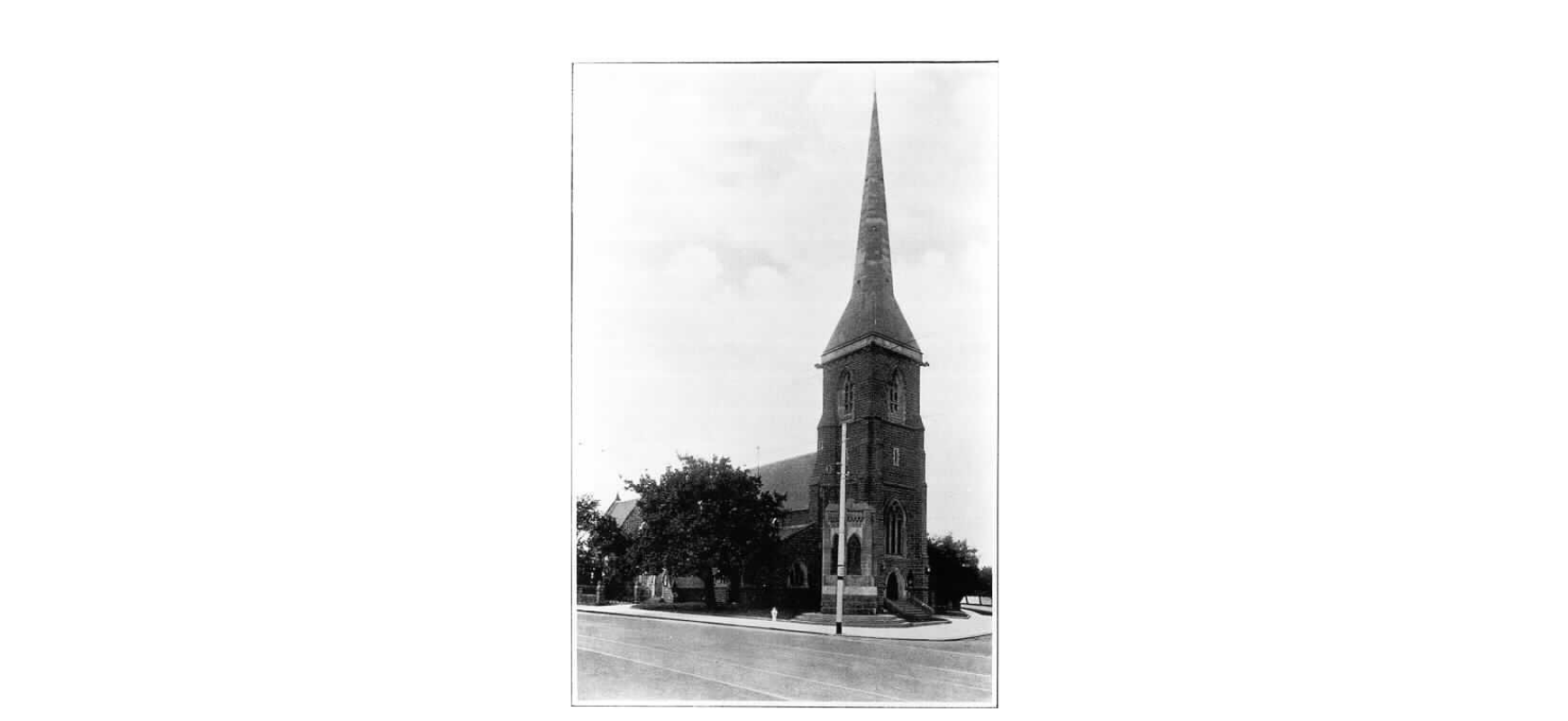
  Church of St John the Evangelist, Toorak, 1934
- Saint Peter's Roman Catholic Church, built in 1876 in the Gothic style and extended in 1934. A campanile was added during renovations in 2018.
- Toorak Uniting Church (1876), in the Frenchified Gothic style
- Swedish Church

The Wesleyan Church (1877), formerly on the corner of Toorak and Williams Roads, was illegally demolished in 1990 by developers and later replaced by a block of flats.

== Schools ==
Schools in Toorak include St Catherine's School, Loreto Mandeville Hall, St Kevin's College, Glamorgan (now Toorak Campus, the junior school of Geelong Grammar School) and Toorak Central School (1890).

== Sport ==
The Royal South Yarra Lawn Tennis Club was founded in 1884 and is located in Toorak. Kooyong Stadium, former home of the Australian Open, is located on Glenferrie Road.

== Transport ==
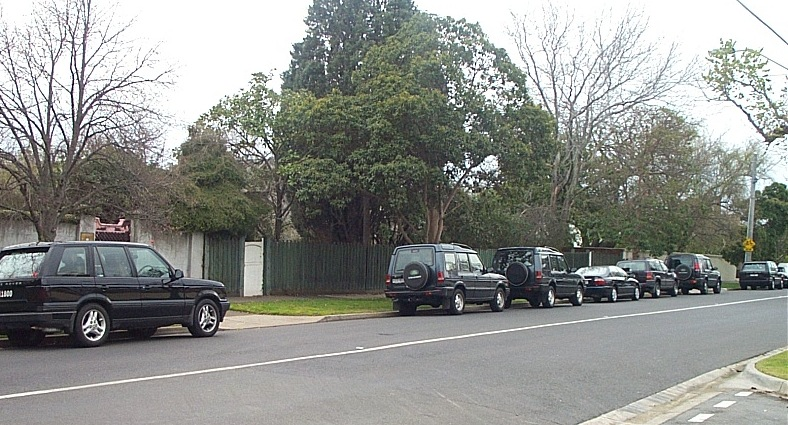
SUVs line a residential street in Toorak

The most popular form of transport in Toorak is the automobile. CityLink runs along north eastern Toorak, though there are no interchanges within the suburb, although there is access to the freeway via MacRobertson Bridge and interchanges at Burnley. Main arterials running north–south are Williams Road (at the eastern boundary), Grange Road, Orrong Road, St Georges Road and Kooyong Road. The east–west arterials include Alexandra Avenue (at the northern boundary), Toorak Road (which runs midway through the suburb) and Malvern Road (at the southern boundary). Alexandra Avenue becomes St Georges Road and both along with Grange Road feed onto the MacRobertson Bridge, Toorak's main river crossing.

Toorak's road planning is an example of street hierarchy. As a result, there are numerous quiet pedestrian streets. However, traffic congestion is an increasing problem along Toorak Road and Williams Roads. There is limited street parking along the main roads with just a couple of multi-storey car parks and parking lots within proximity of the main Toorak Road shopping strip. There are no level crossings in Toorak. There is a perception in popular culture of the luxury 4WD as a status symbol, (controversial for their comfort rather than for their off-road abilities) and this has been associated with the suburb of Toorak, such that in popular Australian culture, the term 'Toorak Tractor' has become well established in Australian slang. An example of this was an episode of the popular program Top Gear Australia, aired on SBS TV, in which the presenters, tongue-in-cheek, drove a $200,000 tractor along Toorak Road.

Toorak's only railway station is Heyington, on the Glen Waverley line, which crosses the Yarra from Richmond on the Heyington Railway Bridge, to the suburb's north. Despite its name, Toorak railway station is located in Armadale. The Pakenham, Frankston and Cranbourne railway line group to which this station belongs runs close to Toorak's southern boundary. Other nearby stations include Hawksburn, in South Yarra and Kooyong, in Kooyong.

Trams have run down Toorak Road since 1888. Route 58 runs along Toorak Road to Glenferrie Road, at the suburb's eastern boundary. Route 72 runs along Malvern Road, the suburb's southern boundary.

Cycling facilities are poor, with few marked on road lanes. MacRobertson Bridge and Gardiners Creek pedestrian bridge, however, the bridge provides pedestrians access to the Main Yarra Trail and shared bicycle and pedestrian paths in nearby Burnley. Pedestrians are serviced by an extensive network of footpaths and pedestrian crossings.

== Residents ==
=== Celebrities, philanthropists, cultural figures ===
- Tina Arena AM – singer/songwriter
- Dame Zara Bate DBE – Fashion designer and wife of Harold Holt
- Martin Clemens CBE MC AM - war hero
- Albert Dadon AM – Chair of the Australian Israel Cultural Exchange
- Gina Liano – Real Housewife of Melbourne
- Paul Little AO and Jane Hansen – business people, philanthropists, Little was a former president of the Essendon Football Club
- Peter Hudson – television chef and entertainer, born in Toorak in 1930
- Eddie McGuire AM – Journalist, sports commentator, television and radio personality, Australian republic advocate and former president of the Collingwood Football Club
- Dame Elisabeth Murdoch AC DBE
- Dame Merlyn Myer DBE – philanthropist
- Sir Norman Myer – philanthropist and chairman of the Myer Emporium
- Sidney Myer – philanthropist and founder of the Myer Emporium
- Livinia Nixon – Channel 9 presenter and the Ambassador and face for the City of Melbourne-Grew up in Toorak
- Susan Renouf – socialite
- Peter Robb – Australian author, born in Toorak in 1946
- Dame Hilda Stevenson DBE – philanthropist

=== Politicians ===
- Ted Baillieu – Victorian Liberal Party politician, 46th Premier of Victoria
- Malcolm Fraser AC CH – Liberal Party politician, 22nd Prime Minister of Australia
- Duncan Gillies – Colonial politician, 14th Premier of Victoria
- David Hamer AM DSC – Director of Naval Intelligence, Liberal Party Senator
- Sir Rupert Hamer AC KCMG ED – Liberal Party politician, 39th Premier of Victoria
- Harold Holt CH – Liberal Party politician, 17th Prime Minister of Australia
- Sir William Murray McPherson KBE – Philanthropist and politician, 31st Premier of Victoria

=== Businesspeople ===
- John Munro Bruce – retail businessman, father of prime minister Stanley Bruce
- Lindsay Fox AC – Former Australian Rules footballer, owner of the Linfox transportation company
- Michael Gudinski AM – Entrepreneur and businessman
- Solomon Lew – Importer and retail supplier, current resident of Toorak
- Peter Lew – managing director of Witchery clothing, son of Solomon Lew
- Keith Murdoch – journalist and newspaper owner
- Ziggy Switkowski AO – former CEO of Telstra
- Sir Donald Trescowthick AC KBE
- Alex Waislitz – Chairman & CEO of Thorney Investment group, vice president of the Collingwood Football Club
- Ron Walker AC CBE – Lord Mayor of Melbourne
- Ed Craven – Co-founder of the online casino Stake

=== Sportspeople ===
- Nathan Buckley – Australian rules footballer, head coach of the Collingwood Football Club from 2012 to 2021
- Andrew Demetriou – former chief executive of the AFL
- Walter Fellows – English-born vicar who hit a cricket ball for 175 yards, considered the world record
- Lleyton Hewitt – Australian tennis player
- Clem Hill – Australian test cricketer
- James Hird – Australian Rules Footballer and former head coach of the Essendon Football Club
- Ed Langdon – AFL footballer grew up in Toorak
- Tom Langdon – AFL footballer grew up in Toorak
- Charlie McLeod – Australian test cricketer
- Lou Richards MBE – Australian Rules footballer
- Jack Saunders – Australian test cricketer
- Tup Scott – cricketer
- David Hayes- horse trainer

== See also ==
- City of Malvern – Parts of Toorak were previously within this former local government area.
- City of Prahran – Parts of Toorak were previously within this former local government area.
