= Kooyong, Victoria =

Kooyong
- Suburb
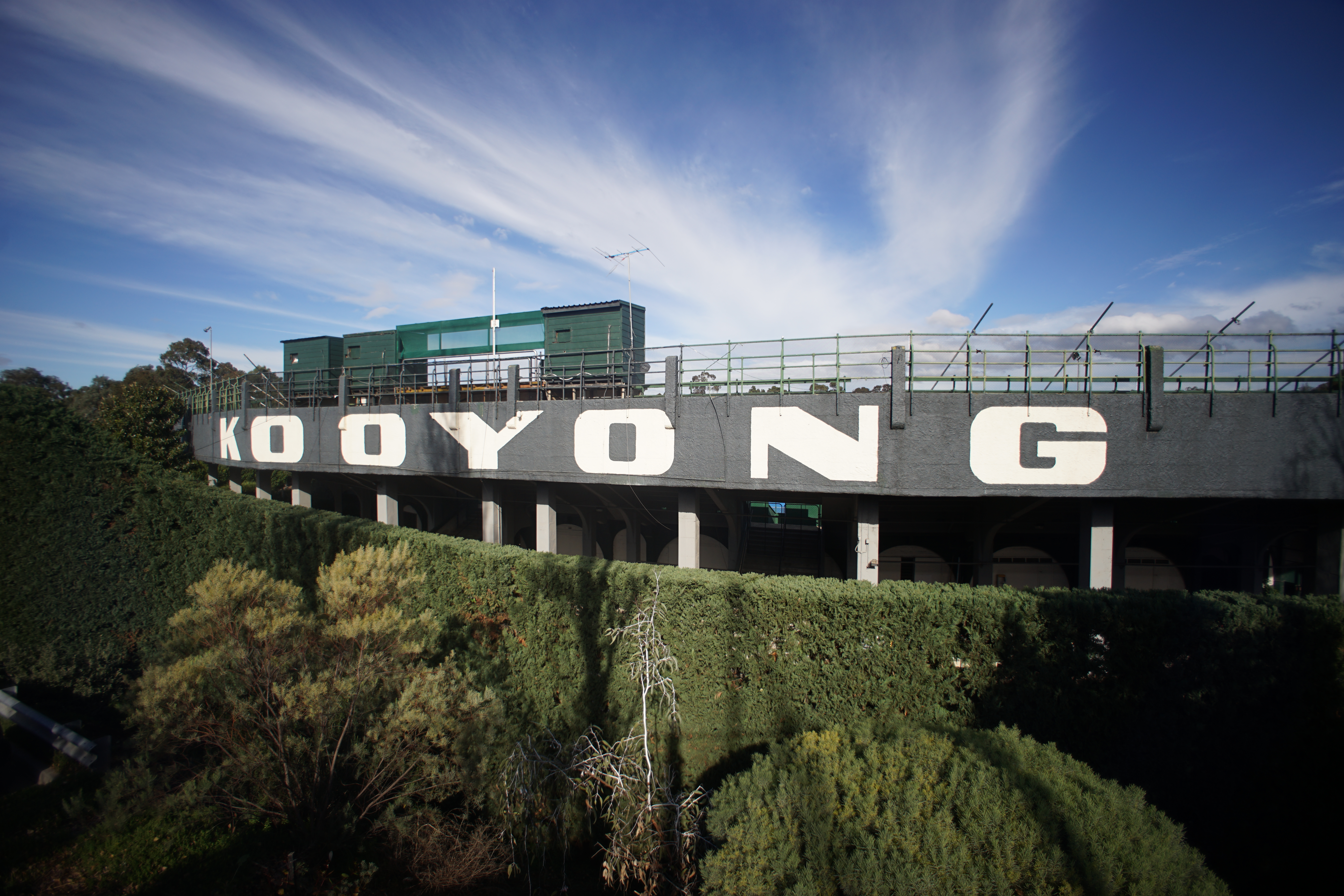
- Image of the exterior grandstand (North) of Kooyong tennis stadium in Melbourne Australia showing iconic lettering and broadcast boxes.

- Interactive map of Kooyong
- Coordinates: 37°50′31″S 145°2′6″E
- Country: Australia
- State: Victoria
- City: Melbourne
- LGA: City of Stonnington
- Location: 7 km (4.3 mi) from Melbourne

Government
  - State electorate: Malvern
  - Federal division: Kooyong

Area
  - Total: 0.5 km^{2} (0.19 sq mi)
- Elevation: 22 m (72 ft)

Population
  - Total: 842 (2021 census)
  - Density: 1,680/km^{2} (4,400/sq mi)
- Postcode: 3144
Suburbs around Kooyong
Toorak	Toorak	Hawthorn
Toorak	Kooyong	Hawthorn
Toorak	Malvern	Malvern

Kooyong (/ˈkuːjɒŋ/) is a suburb in Melbourne, Victoria, Australia, 7 km south-east of Melbourne's Central Business District, located within the City of Stonnington local government area. Kooyong recorded a population of 842 at the 2021 census.

Kooyong is the second most expensive suburb of Melbourne, with a median house price of $3.585 million.

Kooyong takes its name from Kooyong Koot Creek, which was the original name given to Gardiners Creek by the government surveyor, Robert Hoddle, in 1837. It is thought that the name derives from an Aboriginal word meaning camp or resting place, or haunt of the wild fowl. It is best known for being the namesake of Kooyong Stadium and Kooyong Lawn Tennis Club, neither of which are officially in Kooyong. It borders the suburbs of Hawthorn, Malvern and Toorak.

== History ==
Kooyong Post Office opened on 18 March 1912.

== Population ==
In the 2016 census, there were 817 people in Kooyong. 72.2% of people were born in Australia and 80.5% of people spoke only English at home. The most common responses for religion were No Religion 29.7%, Catholic 23.1% and Anglican 16.9%.

== Transport ==
The suburb is serviced by the Kooyong railway station, as well as tram route 16.

== Sport ==
Malvern City Soccer club are located in Kooyong and play their home games at Sir Zelman Cowen Park.

Malvern Braves Baseball Club are also located at Sir Zelman Cowen Park.

== See also ==
- City of Malvern – Kooyong was previously within this former local government area.
