= Ted Laurie =

Australian barrister (1912–1989)

Edward Andrew Hevingham Laurie, QC (31 August 1912 – 29 October 1989) was an Australian barrister and communist.

== Biography ==
Born at Hampton in Melbourne to William Spalding Laurie and Minnie Mabel Monica, née Root, he grew up near his father's medical practice in Camberwell and attended Scotch College, of which he was captain (1930). He received a Bachelor of Law (1935) and eventually a Master of Law (1944) from the University of Melbourne where he resided at Ormond College. In 1935, he began work with Makower, McBeath & Co. He moved to Brisbane in 1936 and in 1939 joined the Communist Party of Australia. He soon returned to Melbourne, however, and became involved with the Federated Clerks' Union. He enlisted in the Australian Imperial Force on 1 June 1942, having served in the militia for much of the previous year, and embarked as part of an anti-aircraft unit in August bound for Milne Bay.

Laurie was promoted lieutenant in March 1943, and was granted leave from the army to contest the 1943 federal election, standing as a Communist against Robert Menzies in Kooyong. His AIF appointment was terminated in November 1944 and he was transferred to the Reserve. On 18 August 1944 he had married Lesley Maie Mackay, known as Bon, at Chatswood in Sydney. After the war he spent a brief period in the Queensland Trades and Labour Council's research bureau before returning to Melbourne. He was called to the bar on 6 June 1946, and in 1949 appeared before the Royal Commission Inquiring into the Origins, Aims, Objects and Funds of the Communist Party in Victoria and Other Related Matters into the Victorian Communist Party, a case that went to the High Court as Australian Communist Party v Commonwealth, where Laurie and his fellow barristers succeeded in having the Menzies Government's attempt to ban the Communist Party overturned.

Laurie had established a successful law practice by this time, although his application to take silk in 1962 was blocked on political grounds. On 16 November 1965, however, he was appointed Queen's Counsel, the second Australian communist to receive the appointment. Within the Communist Party he was increasingly marginalised as he demanded greater democracy in the way the party was run. He left the party in 1965, but remained active in left-wing causes, supporting conscientious objectors during the Vietnam War and Aboriginal land rights. Laurie's retirement in 1982 was preceded by his wife's suicide (1977) and the loss of a leg to diabetes. He drowned in his swimming pool in Carlton North on 29 October 1989.
