= 1910 Kooyong by-election =

← 1910	24 August 1910	1913 →

The Kooyong seat in the House of Representatives
- Registered: 38,394
- Turnout: 21,980 (57.3%)
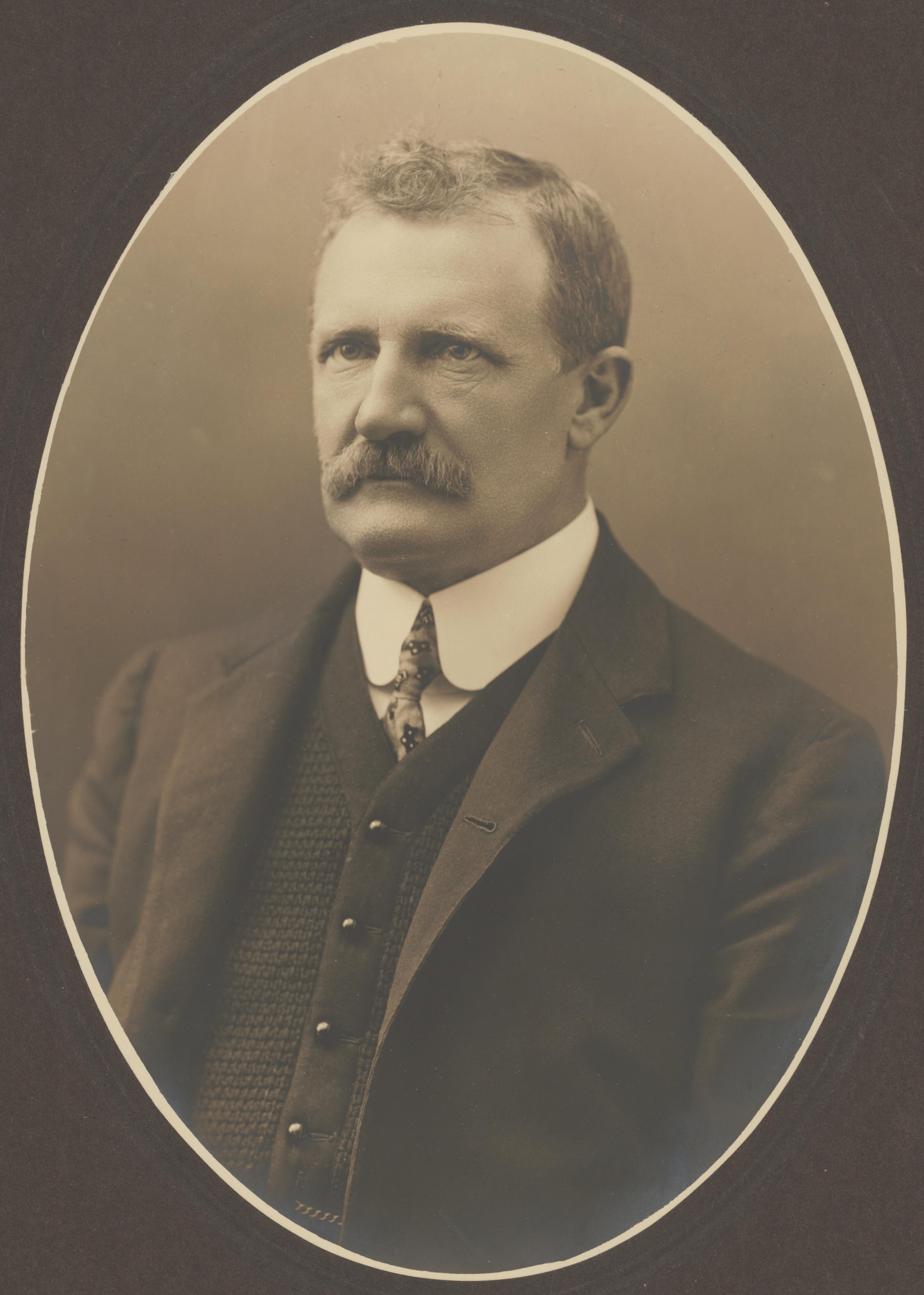

	First party	Second party	Third party
Candidate	Robert Best	Alfred Lumsden	Leger Erson
Party	Liberal	Ind. Liberal	Ind. Labour
Popular vote	11,925	8,214	1,363
Percentage	55.5%	38.2%	6.3%
Swing	▼0.8	▼5.5	▲6.3
MP before election
William Knox
Liberal
Elected MP
Robert Best
Liberal

A by-election was held for the Australian House of Representatives seat of Kooyong on 24 August 1910. This was triggered by the resignation of Commonwealth Liberal Party (CLP) MP William Knox. It is the first by-election to be triggered by the resignation of the sitting member who did not then re-contest the seat in the by-election.

The election was won by CLP candidate Robert Best.

== Results ==
1910 Kooyong by-election
Party	Candidate	Votes	%	±%
Liberal	Robert Best	11,926	55.46	−0.79
Independent Liberal	Alfred Lumsden	8,214	38.20	−5.54
Independent Labour	Leger Erson	1,363	6.34	+6.34
Total formal votes		21,503	97.83	−1.24
Informal votes		477	2.17	+1.24
Registered electors		38,394		
Turnout		21,980	57.25	−13.81
Liberal hold		Swing	−0.79	

== See also ==
- List of Australian federal by-elections
