= Petro Georgiou =

Australian politician (1947–2025)

Petro Georgiou AO
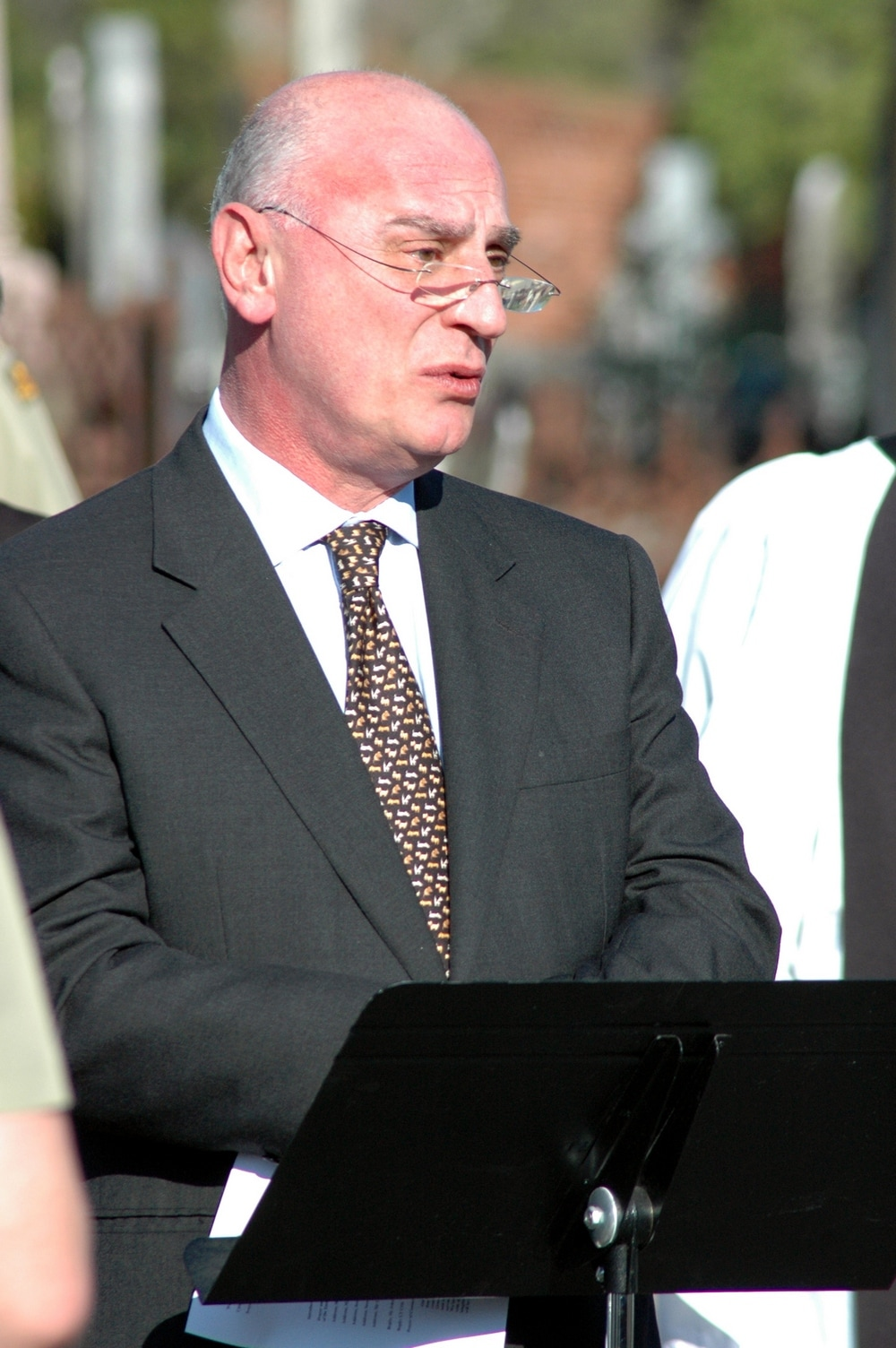
- Georgiou in 2006

Member of the Australian Parliament for Kooyong
- In office 19 November 1994 – 19 July 2010
- Preceded by: Andrew Peacock
- Succeeded by: Josh Frydenberg

Personal details
- Born: 30 November 1947 Corfu, Greece
- Died: 4 April 2025 (aged 77)
- Party: Liberal
- Children: 2
- Education: University of Melbourne
- Occupation: Tutor, political advisor

Petro Georgiou AO (30 November 1947 – 4 April 2025) was an Australian politician who was a Liberal member of the Australian House of Representatives from November 1994 to July 2010, representing the Division of Kooyong, Victoria.

== Early life ==
Born on 30 November 1947 in Corfu, Greece, Georgiou was educated at Melbourne University. He was a senior tutor in politics at La Trobe University 1970–73, Senior Adviser to Prime Minister Malcolm Fraser 1975–79, Secretary of the Ethnic Television Review Panel 1979–80, Director of the Australian Institute of Multicultural Affairs 1980–85, Senior Adviser to the Leader of the Opposition, Andrew Peacock, 1985, Director of the Victorian Liberal Policy Unit 1985–89 and State Director of the Victorian Liberal Party 1989–94. Georgiou battled Opposition leader John Hewson to exempt food from the 15% GST he proposed at the federal election in 1993 which the Liberals were defeated at. Had Georgiou's suggestion not been taken the defeat would have been greater for the Coalition. Georgiou would later work for Hewson as his chief of staff until Hewson was replaced by Alexander Downer following a leadership spill.

== Parliament ==
Upon the resignation of former Liberal leader Andrew Peacock, Georgiou was preselected to contest the 1994 Kooyong by-election for the Liberal Party. He won the safe Liberal seat on 64 percent of the two-party vote against the main contender, the Greens. He was only the fourth member for this blue-ribbon non-Labor seat in 72 years.

In 2005, Georgiou was one of a small number of Liberal parliamentarians who expressed disagreement with the government's policy of mandatory detention for asylum seekers. He began speaking out against the policy in June and began drafting a private member's bill aimed at softening the policy. On 17 June, Prime Minister John Howard announced a shift in that policy, allowing families in detention with children to enter the community and ensuring that long-term detainees would have their cases reviewed regularly. Georgiou was given a large amount of credit for the policy change.

On 11 August 2006, Georgiou joined Russell Broadbent and Judi Moylan in crossing the floor to vote against the Migration Amendment (Designated Unauthorised Arrivals) Bill, which would force all asylum seekers to be processed offshore.

=== Preselection challenge ===
In March 2006, Josh Frydenberg, an investment banker and former political adviser, made known his intention to challenge Georgiou for his seat in an internal Liberal Party preselection. This followed another prominent Liberal former Victorian president Michael Kroger's decision not to contest the seat. Liberal deputy leader Peter Costello endorsed Georgiou, and Kroger is believed to have supported him.

In the days leading to the preselection convention, Queensland frontbenchers Ian Macfarlane, Peter Dutton and Santo Santoro backed Frydenberg's credentials, to the dismay of former premier Jeff Kennett. The preselection was held at Trinity Grammar School on 23 April 2006. Georgiou retained selection by receiving 62 of the 85 Liberal Party delegates' votes, with challenger Frydenberg receiving 22 votes and a third candidate, Alistair Armstrong, receiving one vote.

=== Retirement ===
On 22 November 2008, Georgiou announced he would retire at the 2010 federal election. His valedictory speech to the House of Representatives criticised both major parties regarding their immigration policies. He was the first member for this blue-ribbon Liberal seat in more than a century to spend his entire career on the backbench; since 1910, all of his predecessors had served long spells as either cabinet ministers or opposition frontbenchers. Howard offered Georgiou a parliamentary secretary position in 1998, but he turned it down.

== Death ==
Georgiou died on 4 April 2025, at the age of 77.

== Honours ==
In the 2013 Queen's Birthday Honours, Petro Georgiou was made an Officer of the Order of Australia (AO) "For distinguished service to the Parliament of Australia, to multiculturalism and human rights advocacy, and to the community."

Parliament of Australia
Preceded by Andrew Peacock	Member for Kooyong; 1994–2010	Succeeded by Josh Frydenberg
