= 1994 Kooyong by-election =

Australian federal by-election

← 1993	19 November 1994	1996 →
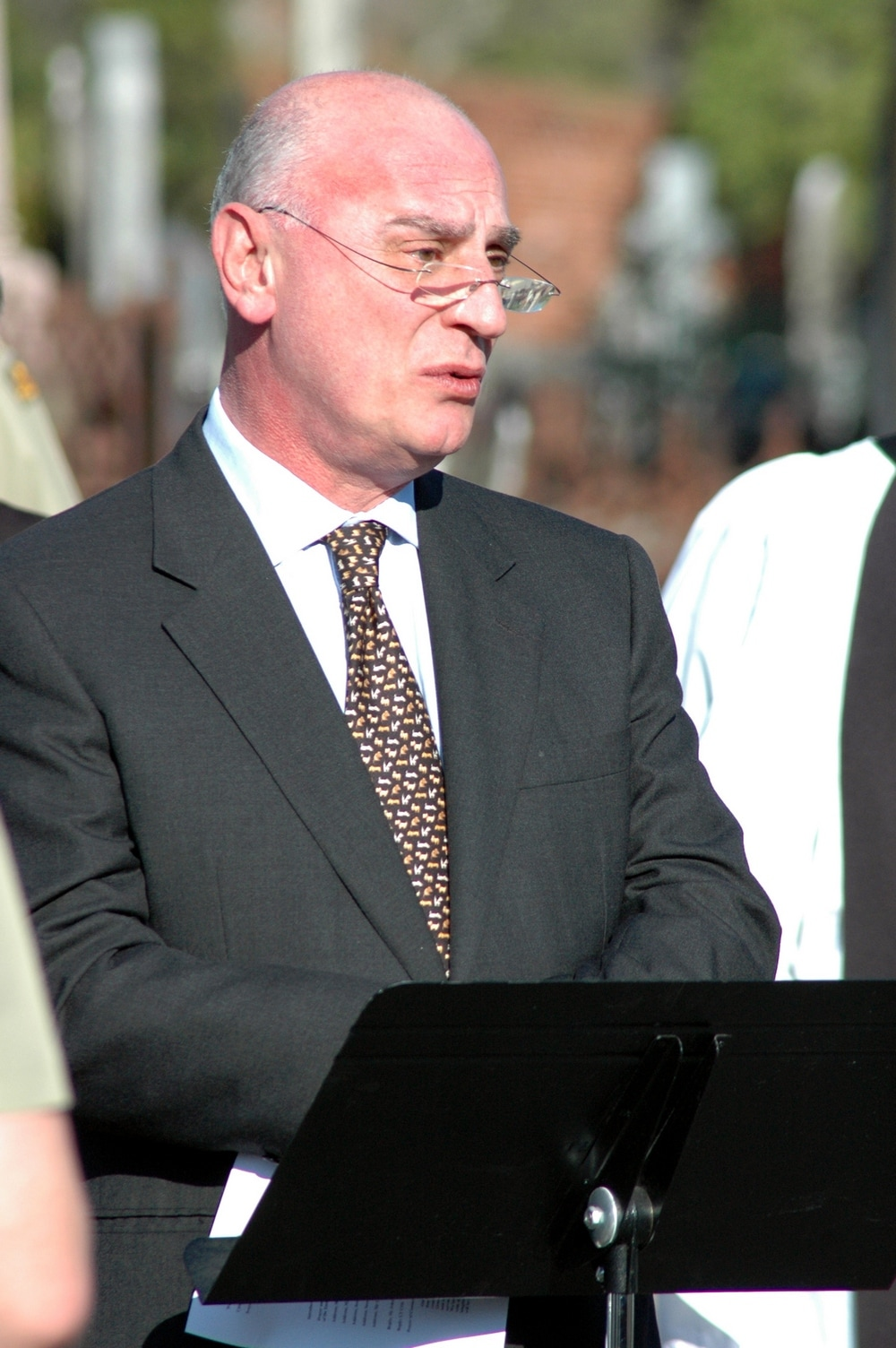

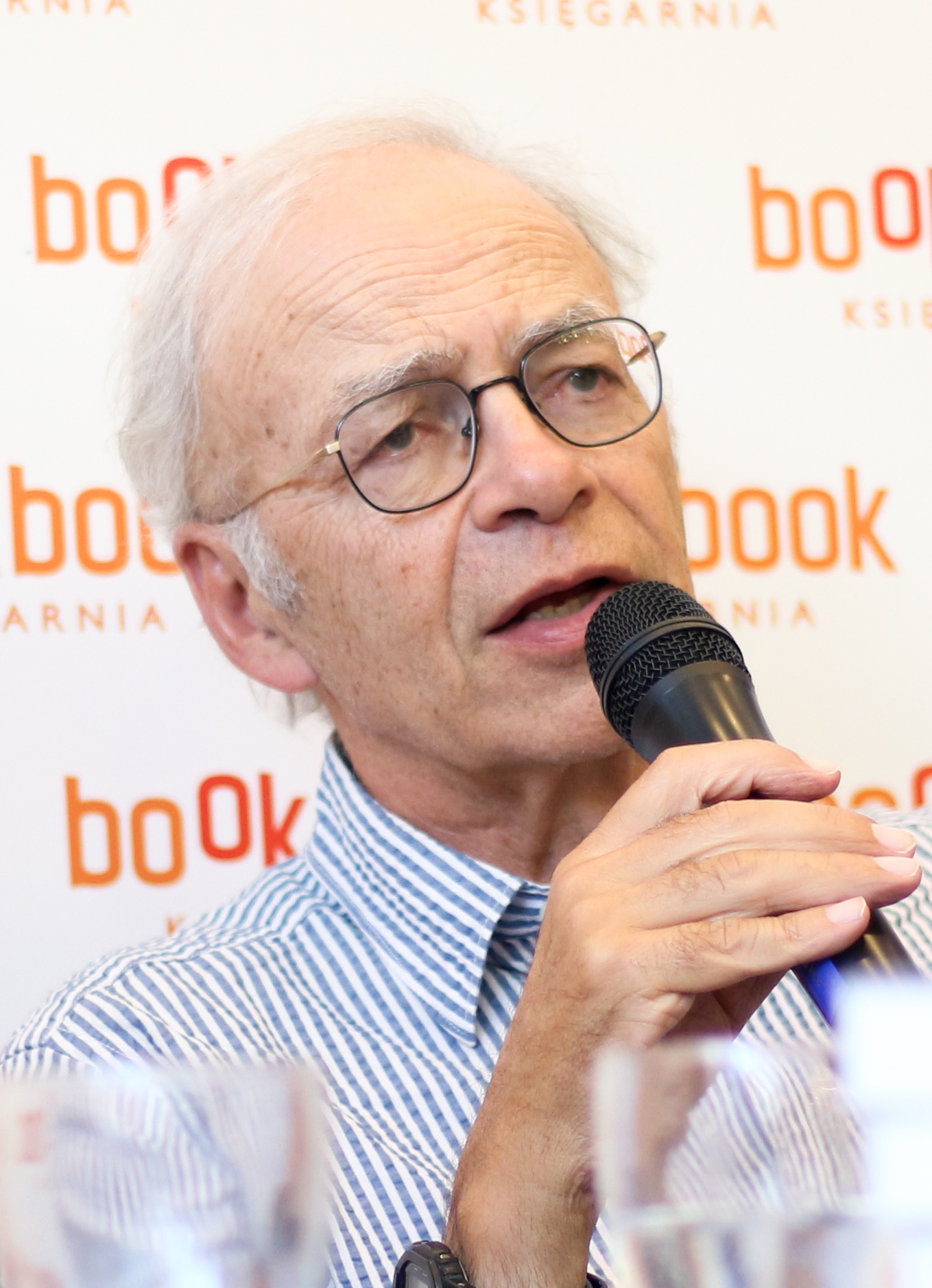
	First party	Second party
Candidate	Petro Georgiou	Peter Singer
Party	Liberal	Greens
Primary vote	32,872	16,202
Percentage	56.86%	28.03%
Swing	▼7.27	▲28.03
TCP	64.03%	35.97%
TCP swing	▼0.03	▲35.97
MP before election
Andrew Peacock
Liberal
Elected MP
Petro Georgiou
Liberal

The 1994 Kooyong by-election was held in the Australian electorate of Kooyong in Victoria on 19 November 1994. The by-election was triggered by the resignation of the sitting member, the Liberal Party of Australia's Andrew Peacock on 17 September 1994. The writ for the by-election was issued on 14 October 1994.

The by-election was won by Liberal Party candidate Petro Georgiou.

== Results ==
1994 Kooyong by-election
Party	Candidate	Votes	%	±%
Liberal	Petro Georgiou	32,872	56.86	−7.27
Greens	Peter Singer	16,202	28.03	+28.03
AAFI	Angela Walker	4,573	7.91	+7.91
Independent	Yasmin Cotton	2,004	3.47	+3.47
Independent	Gilbert Boffa	955	1.65	+1.65
Imperial British	David L J Greagg	686	1.19	+1.19
Independent	Paul Francis Tobias	518	0.90	+0.90
Total formal votes		57,810	96.39	−1.08
Informal votes		2,166	3.61	+1.08
Turnout		59 976	82.79	−13.00
Two-candidate-preferred result
Liberal	Petro Georgiou	36,964	64.03	−0.03
Greens	Peter Singer	20,766	35.97	+35.97
Liberal hold		Swing	N/A	

== See also ==
- List of Australian federal by-elections
