= 1966 Kooyong by-election =

← 1963	2 April 1966	1966 →

The Kooyong seat in the House of Representatives
- Turnout: 44,948 (89.98%)
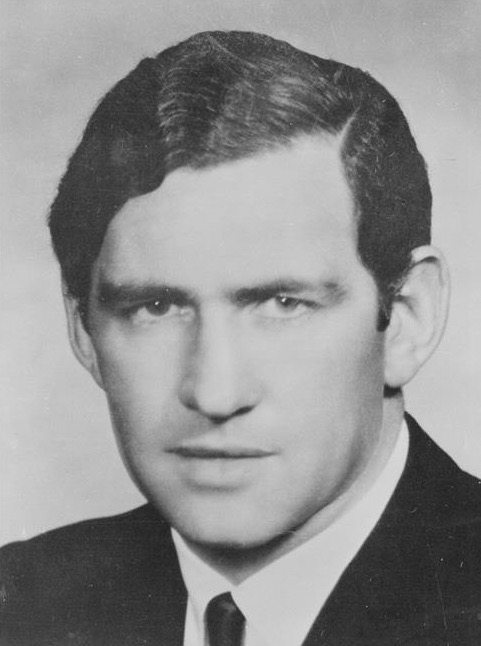

	First party	Second party
Candidate	Andrew Peacock	William Cooper
Party	Liberal	Labor
Popular vote	25,012	12,181
Percentage	56.78%	27.65%
Swing	▼7.14	▲3.28
MP before election
Sir Robert Menzies
Liberal
Elected MP
Andrew Peacock
Liberal

A by-election was held for the Australian House of Representatives seat of Kooyong on 2 April 1966, following the resignation of Liberal Party MP and former Prime Minister Sir Robert Menzies on 16 February 1966.

The by-election was won by Liberal candidate Andrew Peacock, although with a reduced majority.

== Results ==
Kooyong by-election, 1966
Party	Candidate	Votes	%	±%
Liberal	Andrew Peacock	25,012	56.78	−7.14
Labor	William Cooper	12,181	27.65	+3.28
Democratic Labor	Bernie Gaynor	5,854	13.29	+3.12
Independent	Peter Brereton	781	1.77	+1.77
Republican	Charles Cook	220	0.50	+0.50
Total formal votes		44,048	97.98	−0.95
Informal votes		900	2.02	+0.95
Turnout		44,948	89.98	−5.94
Two-party-preferred result
Liberal	Andrew Peacock	30,569	69.4	−4.7
Labor	William Cooper	13,478	30.6	+4.7
Liberal hold		Swing	−4.7	

== See also ==
- List of Australian federal by-elections
