= Division of Kooyong =

Australian federal electoral division

Coordinates: 37.812°S 145.061°E

Kooyong Australian House of Representatives Division
- Interactive map of electorate boundaries from the 2025 federal election
- Created: 1901
- MP: Monique Ryan
- Party: Independent
- Namesake: Kooyong
- Electors: 124,516 (2025)
- Area: 59 km^{2} (22.8 sq mi)
- Demographic: Inner metropolitan
Electorates around Kooyong:
Cooper	Jagajaga	Menzies
Melbourne	Kooyong	Menzies
Macnamara	Chisholm	Chisholm

The Division of Kooyong (/kuːjɒŋ/) is an electoral division for the Australian House of Representatives in the state of Victoria, which covers an area of approximately 59 km^{2} (23 mi^{2}) in the inner-east of Melbourne. It contains the suburbs of Armadale, Canterbury, Deepdene, Hawthorn, Hawthorn East, Kew, Kew East, Kooyong, Malvern and Toorak, as well as parts of Balwyn, Balwyn North, Camberwell, Glen Iris, Malvern East, Prahran, Surrey Hills and Mont Albert North

At the 2022 election, teal independent Monique Ryan became the member for the electorate, unseating former Liberal deputy leader and federal treasurer, Josh Frydenberg. It was the first time since Federation that the seat had not been held by the Liberal Party or its predecessors. Ryan was the first woman to hold the seat, as well as the first person to unseat an incumbent in Kooyong since 1922.

== Geography ==
Since 1984, federal electoral division boundaries in Australia have been determined by a redistribution committee appointed by the Australian Electoral Commission. Redistributions occur for the boundaries of divisions in a particular state, and they take place every seven years, or sooner if a state's representation entitlement changes, or when divisions of a state are malapportioned.

== Demography ==
The 2021 Census found that 64% of Kooyong constituents were born in Australia, with 8.4% being born in China. 44.8% of people stated they were not religious, with the next most common responses being Catholic (19.6%), and Anglican (7.9%). At the time of the 2022 Australian federal election, over 11% of Kooyong's population had Chinese ancestry.

== History ==
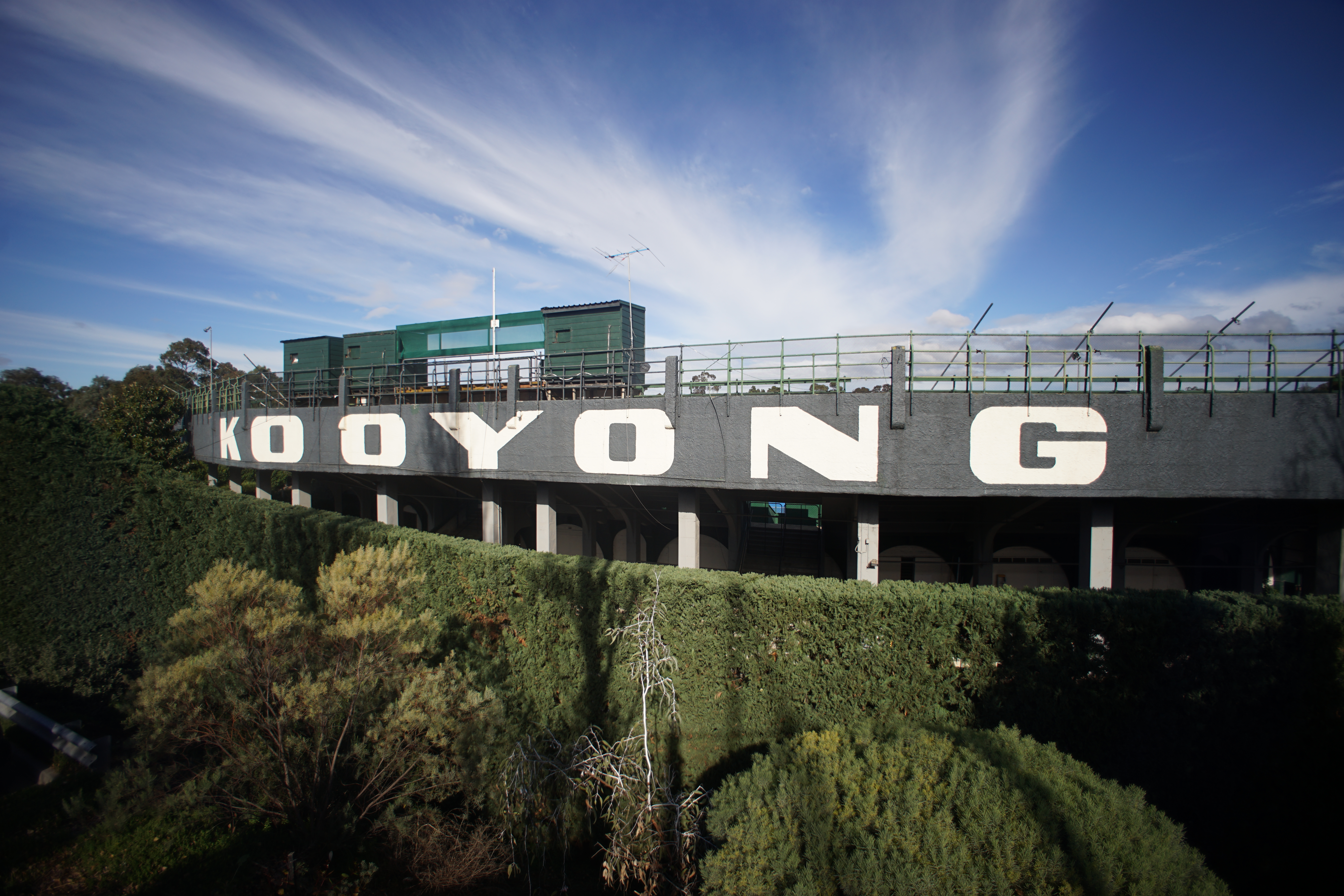
Kooyong Tennis Stadium, 2014

The division was proclaimed in 1900, and was one of the original 65 divisions to be contested at the first Federal election. It was named after the suburb of Kooyong, which it originally included. The name derives from an Aboriginal word for camp or resting place. The electorate has not always included the suburb of Kooyong or its namesake tennis stadium, although they were re-included in the electorate boundaries for the 2025 federal election.

Kooyong was held by the Liberal Party of Australia and its conservative predecessors for the first 121 years of its existence, apart from 1921 to 1925, when John Latham successfully ran as a "Liberal", mainly on the platform of removing Billy Hughes as prime minister. With Hughes' resignation in 1923, Latham joined the governing Nationalist Party, and remained a member till his resignation from the seat and his elevation to the High Court. It is one of two original electorates in Victoria to have never been won by the Australian Labor Party, the other being Gippsland.

The seat's best-known member was Sir Robert Menzies, the longest-serving Prime Minister of Australia. From 1922 to 1994, it was held by only three members, all of whom went on to lead the non-Labor forces in Parliament – former Opposition Leader and future Chief Justice Latham, Menzies, and former Opposition Leader Andrew Peacock.

For decades, it was one of the safest Liberal-National coalition seats in metropolitan Australia. Even during Labor's landslide victory in 1943, Menzies won comfortably with 62.5 percent of the two-party-preferred vote.

Peacock's successor, high-profile Liberal backbencher Petro Georgiou, saw off a challenge from Josh Frydenberg for Liberal Party preselection in April 2006 but, on 22 November 2008, Georgiou announced his retirement at the next federal election. Frydenberg won preselection as the Liberal Party's candidate for the seat for the 2010 election and won, despite a small swing against him.

In 2019, high-profile Greens candidate Julian Burnside received the highest two-party preferred vote against the Liberals or their predecessors in 90 years, with 44.3%. The Liberals had anticipated a strong contest and had doubled their campaign funding for Kooyong earlier in the year, from $500,000 to $1 million. Frydenberg retained the seat, despite suffering a significant negative swing of 8.81%, and the Liberal Party received its lowest first preference vote in the electorate in 76 years. It was also only the second time in 76 years that the major non-Labor party did not win the seat outright on the first count. The swing was large enough to make the seat marginal in a "traditional" two-party contest with Labor, for the first time in decades. Frydenberg's margin in a "traditional" match-up with Labor fell to 6.8 percent. Although the Liberal Party won in the majority of booths, the Greens had the highest primary vote in three polling booths (Melbourne, Glenferrie and Glenferrie Central) and won the two-party-preferred vote in 10 booths.

At the 2022 Australian federal election, "Teal independent" candidate Monique Ryan defeated Frydenberg 52.9-47.1 of the 2PP after-preference vote. Both Frydenberg's and Ryan's campaigns spent over A$2 million each.

Two-party-preferred vote in Kooyong, 1996–2025
Election	1996	1998	2001	2004	2007	2010	2013	2016	2019	2022	2025
Liberal	63.81%	61.39%	60.94%	59.58%	59.53%	57.55%	61.06%	63.34%	55.70%	47.06%	49.33%
Labor	36.19%	38.61%	39.06%	40.42%	40.47%	42.45%	38.94%	36.66%			
Greens									44.30%		
Independent										52.94%	50.67%
Government	L/NP	L/NP	L/NP	L/NP	ALP	ALP	L/NP	L/NP	L/NP	ALP	ALP

== Location ==
The Division is named after the suburb of Kooyong, on which it was originally based. However, the suburb of Kooyong was not in its namesake electorate from 1949 to 2025, and was in neighbouring Higgins. Nonetheless, the seat retained the name of Kooyong, primarily because the Australian Electoral Commission guidelines on redistributions require it to preserve the names of original electorates where possible. With the abolition of Higgins in the leadup to the 2025 election, the suburb of Kooyong has returned to its namesake seat.

== Members ==
Image	Member	Party	Term	Notes
	William Knox (1850–1913)	Free Trade	29 March 1901 – 1906	Previously a member of the Victorian Legislative Council. Resigned due to ill health
	William Knox (1850–1913)	Anti-Socialist	1906 – 26 May 1909	Previously a member of the Victorian Legislative Council. Resigned due to ill health
	William Knox (1850–1913)	Liberal	26 May 1909 – 26 July 1910	Previously a member of the Victorian Legislative Council. Resigned due to ill health
	Sir Robert Best (1856–1946)	Liberal	24 August 1910 – 17 February 1917	Previously a member of the Senate. Lost seat
	Sir Robert Best (1856–1946)	Nationalist	17 February 1917 – 16 December 1922	Previously a member of the Senate. Lost seat
	Sir John Latham (1877–1964)	Liberal Union	16 December 1922 – 1925	Served as minister under Bruce and Lyons. Served as deputy prime minister under Lyons. Served as Opposition Leader from 1929 to 1931. Retired. Later appointed Chief Justice of Australia
	Sir John Latham (1877–1964)	Nationalist	1925 – 7 May 1931	Served as minister under Bruce and Lyons. Served as deputy prime minister under Lyons. Served as Opposition Leader from 1929 to 1931. Retired. Later appointed Chief Justice of Australia
	Sir John Latham (1877–1964)	United Australia	7 May 1931 – 7 August 1934	Served as minister under Bruce and Lyons. Served as deputy prime minister under Lyons. Served as Opposition Leader from 1929 to 1931. Retired. Later appointed Chief Justice of Australia
	Sir Robert Menzies (1894–1978)	United Australia	15 September 1934 – 21 February 1945	Previously held the Victorian Legislative Assembly seat of Nunawading. Served as minister under Lyons, Page and Fadden. Served as Opposition Leader from 1943 to 1949. Served as Prime Minister from 1939 to 1941, and 1949 to 1966. Resigned to retire from politics
	Sir Robert Menzies (1894–1978)	Liberal	21 February 1945 – 17 February 1966	Previously held the Victorian Legislative Assembly seat of Nunawading. Served as minister under Lyons, Page and Fadden. Served as Opposition Leader from 1943 to 1949. Served as Prime Minister from 1939 to 1941, and 1949 to 1966. Resigned to retire from politics
	Andrew Peacock (1939–2021)	Liberal	2 April 1966 – 17 September 1994	Served as minister under Gorton, McMahon and Fraser. Served as Opposition Leader from 1983 to 1985, and from 1989 to 1990. Resigned to retire from politics
	Petro Georgiou (1947–2025)	Liberal	19 November 1994 – 19 July 2010	Retired
	Josh Frydenberg (1971–)	Liberal	21 August 2010 – 21 May 2022	Served as minister under Turnbull and Morrison. Lost seat
	Monique Ryan (1967–)	Independent	21 May 2022 – present	Incumbent

== Election results ==
2025 Australian federal election: Kooyong
Party	Candidate	Votes	%	±%
Liberal	Amelia Hamer	49,542	43.13	−0.27
Independent	Monique Ryan	38,955	33.91	+3.13
Labor	Clive Crosby	13,671	11.90	+0.57
Greens	Jackie Carter	8,900	7.75	−2.10
Libertarian	Richard Peppard	1,475	1.28	−0.13
One Nation	Camille Brache	1,201	1.05	+0.52
Trumpet of Patriots	David Vader	1,124	0.98	+0.87
Total formal votes		114,868	97.95	+0.78
Informal votes		2,402	2.05	−0.78
Turnout		117,270	94.21	+0.85
Notional two-party-preferred count
Liberal	Amelia Hamer	60,159	52.37	−1.37
Labor	Clive Crosby	54,709	47.63	+1.37
Two-candidate-preferred result
Independent	Monique Ryan	58,200	50.67	−1.85
Liberal	Amelia Hamer	56,668	49.33	+1.85
Independent hold		Swing	−1.85	
