= Josh Frydenberg =

Australian former politician (born 1971)

The Honourable Josh Frydenberg
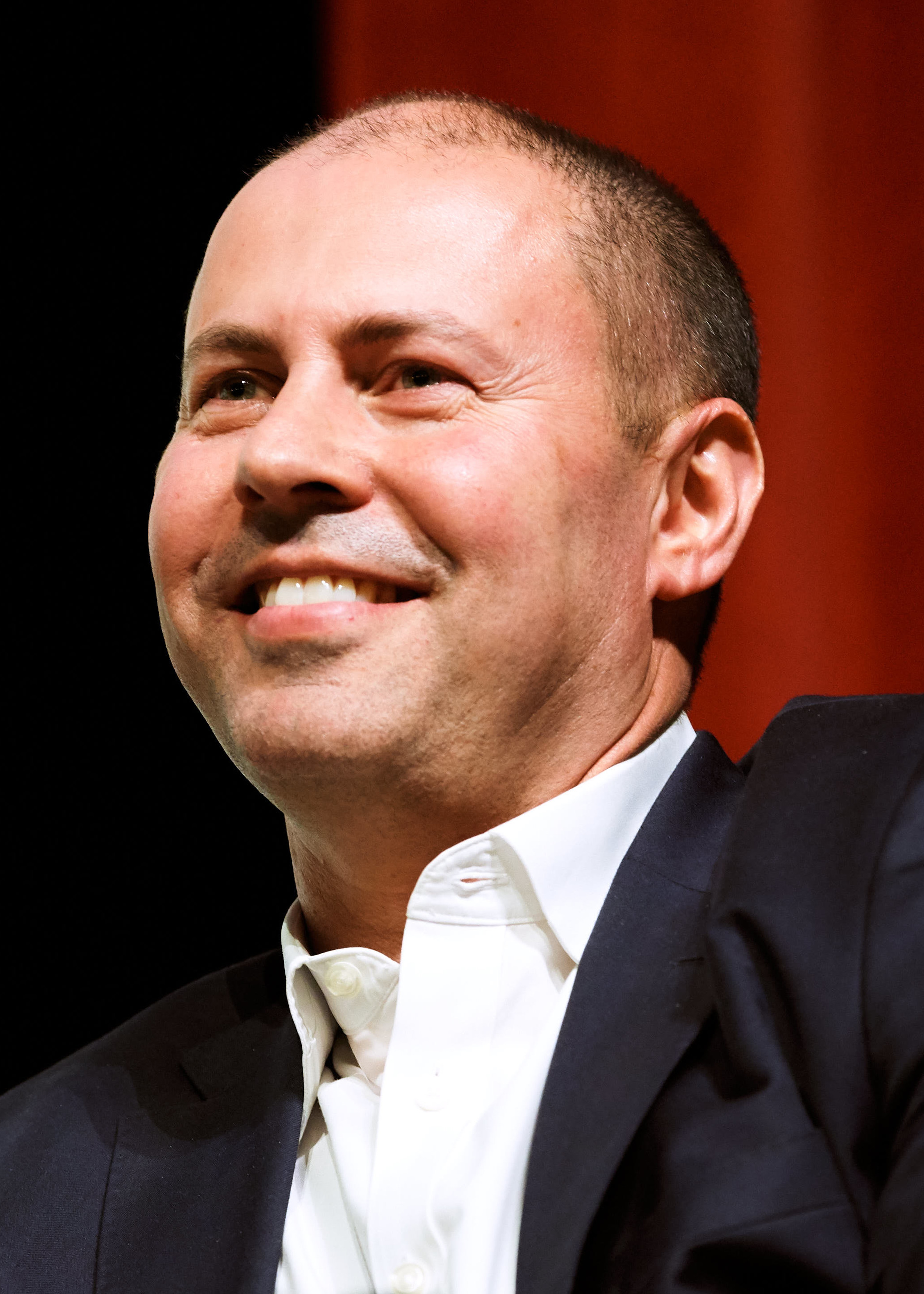
- Frydenberg in 2019

Treasurer of Australia
- In office 24 August 2018 – 23 May 2022 Serving with Scott Morrison (2021–2022)
- Prime Minister: Scott Morrison
- Preceded by: Scott Morrison
- Succeeded by: Jim Chalmers

Deputy Leader of the Liberal Party
- In office 24 August 2018 – 30 May 2022
- Leader: Scott Morrison
- Preceded by: Julie Bishop
- Succeeded by: Sussan Ley

Minister for the Environment and Energy
- In office 19 July 2016 – 24 August 2018
- Prime Minister: Malcolm Turnbull
- Preceded by: Greg Hunt
- Succeeded by: Melissa Price (Note: As Minister for the Environment); Angus Taylor (Note: As Minister for Energy)

Minister for Resources and Energy
- In office 21 September 2015 – 19 July 2016
- Prime Minister: Malcolm Turnbull
- Preceded by: Gary Gray
- Succeeded by: Matt Canavan

Assistant Treasurer of Australia
- In office 23 December 2014 – 21 September 2015
- Prime Minister: Tony Abbott; Malcolm Turnbull
- Preceded by: Arthur Sinodinos
- Succeeded by: Kelly O'Dwyer

Member of the Australian Parliament for Kooyong
- In office 21 August 2010 – 21 May 2022
- Preceded by: Petro Georgiou
- Succeeded by: Monique Ryan

Personal details
- Born: Joshua Anthony Frydenberg; 17 July 1971 (age 55) Melbourne, Victoria, Australia
- Party: Liberal
- Spouse: Amie Saunders
- Children: 2
- Education: Monash University; University College, Oxford; Harvard University
- Profession: Politician; policy adviser; investment banker

Joshua Anthony Frydenberg (/ˈfraɪdənˌbɜːrɡ/; born 17 July 1971) is an Australian former politician who served as the treasurer in the Morrison government from 2018 to 2022, holding office as the deputy leader of the Liberal Party. He was the member of Parliament (MP) for the Victorian division of Kooyong from 2010 to 2022, and served as a minister in the Abbott and Turnbull governments.

After leaving university, Frydenberg served as an adviser to Prime Minister John Howard and Foreign Minister Alexander Downer during the Howard government. He also worked for Deutsche Bank until his election to the Australian House of Representatives at the 2010 federal election. Quickly appointed to the frontbench, he went on to serve in several ministerial roles during the Abbott and Turnbull governments from 2013 to 2018, including as Minister for Resources and Minister for the Environment and Energy. In August 2018, he was elected as deputy leader of the Liberal Party following a leadership spill, which saw Scott Morrison elected as leader and prime minister. Morrison subsequently appointed Frydenberg as treasurer.

At the 2022 federal election, Frydenberg suffered a significant swing against him, and lost his seat to Teal independent candidate Monique Ryan. Frydenberg became the first sitting treasurer to lose his seat since Ted Theodore at the 1931 election. After leaving politics, he became chairman at the Australian arm of investment bank Goldman Sachs.

== Early life and education ==
Frydenberg was born in Melbourne. His mother, Erika Strausz, is a psychologist and University of Melbourne professor and his father Harry is a general surgeon. His mother was a Jewish Hungarian born in 1943 who arrived in Australia in 1950 as a stateless child from a refugee camp after escaping the Holocaust. His great aunt, Mary Frydenberg, is also a victim of the Holocaust; she spent 2 years at the infamous Auschwitz concentration camp. His father is also Jewish; his grandparents emigrated to Australia from Poland in the 1930s. His grandfather owned a haberdashery store, along with two other Jewish families, with locations in Colac, Camperdown, and Mortlake.

Frydenberg was educated at Jewish schools Bialik College and Mount Scopus Memorial College. Throughout his childhood, Frydenberg was a keen tennis player. He lobbied his parents, unsuccessfully, to drop out of high school to pursue a career in tennis. When they refused, Frydenberg stuck up a handwritten sign on his bedroom, reading, "The pain of discipline is far easier than the pain of regret". After finishing high school, he took a gap year to play tennis full-time in Australia and Europe. Frydenberg played against Mark Philippoussis and Pat Rafter, and represented Australia at two World University Games. He and his father were present at the 1997 Maccabiah bridge collapse. A photograph of Frydenberg carrying a man on a stretcher was used in Israeli newspapers.

Frydenberg completed honours degrees in economics and law at Monash University, where he became president of the Law Students Society, before working at Mallesons Stephen Jaques, a large Australian commercial law firm. Frydenberg won both a Fulbright Scholarship to attend Yale University and a Commonwealth Scholarship to attend the University of Oxford. He opted to accept the latter, completing a Master of International Relations at University College, Oxford, with a thesis on Indonesian politics. While deciding between Oxford and Yale, he was introduced to and developed a friendship with Greg Hunt, a Fulbright Scholar and future cabinet colleague, who introduced him to the Liberal Party. Frydenberg was best man at Hunt's wedding, and Hunt was a groomsman at Frydenberg's wedding. When attending Oxford, mutual friend Steven Skala introduced Frydenberg to Sir Zelman Cowen, a former Australian governor-general and Oxford provost at Oriel College. Cowen "became a mentor to Frydenberg and they spent many Sundays together discussing literature, music, philosophy and law".

Frydenberg also earned a Master of Public Administration from the John F. Kennedy School of Government at Harvard University.

Frydenberg was one of seven Liberal MPs in the 46th Parliament of Australia who obtained degrees at an Oxbridge or Ivy League university, the others being Alan Tudge, Angus Taylor, Andrew Laming, Dave Sharma, Greg Hunt and Paul Fletcher.

== Early career ==
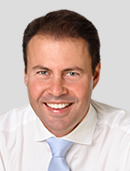
Frydenberg early in his political career

In 1999, Frydenberg worked as an assistant adviser to Attorney-General Daryl Williams before becoming an adviser to Foreign Affairs Minister Alexander Downer, a post he held until 2003. From 2003 to 2005 he was a policy adviser to Prime Minister John Howard, specialising in domestic security issues, border protection, justice and industrial relations. In 2005 he took up a position as a Director of Global Banking with Deutsche Bank in the company's Melbourne office.

=== 2006 preselection attempt ===
In 2006, Frydenberg announced that he was seeking Liberal preselection for Kooyong, a safe Liberal seat in Melbourne's eastern suburbs. He was contesting it against the incumbent member, Petro Georgiou, who had held the seat since 1994.

In the days leading to the preselection convention, Queensland frontbenchers Ian Macfarlane, Peter Dutton and Santo Santoro backed Frydenberg's credentials, for which they were criticised by former Victorian Premier Jeff Kennett.

Georgiou won the nomination by gaining 62 of the 85 delegates' votes, with Frydenberg receiving 22 votes and a third candidate, Alastair Armstrong, receiving one vote. After Frydenberg's defeat, federal Treasurer and deputy Liberal leader Peter Costello, who represented the neighbouring seat of Higgins, encouraged Frydenberg to run for pre-selection in Chisholm, a marginal electorate neighbouring Kooyong, held by Anna Burke of the ALP. Frydenberg declined the offer, saying, "This is where I am from, this is where I feel most comfortable and this is where I think there is real work to be done."

After Georgiou announced his decision to retire at the 2010 election, Frydenberg ran for preselection for Kooyong again. Frydenberg's candidacy was supported by references from former prime minister John Howard and former Opposition Leader Andrew Peacock. With the support of former Liberal state president Michael Kroger, Frydenberg won Liberal preselection. He defeated industrial lawyer John Pesutto, who later went on to become the leader of the Victorian Liberal Party.

== Member of Parliament ==
In the 2010 election, Frydenberg won the seat with 52.56% of the primary vote and 57.55% of the two-party-preferred vote. He was only the fifth person to represent this traditionally safe non-Labor seat in 88 years. He held the seat that was once held by Australia's longest-serving prime minister, Robert Menzies.

The first Jewish Liberal elected to the House of Representatives, in his maiden speech, Frydenberg recounted the story of his Jewish grandparents' and great aunt's migration to Australia from Nazi controlled Europe and lauded the contribution of migrants to communities within his electorate. He enunciated his belief in small government, called for stronger ties with Asia while also maintaining a solid alliance with the US and proposed a target of having two Australian universities within the world's top ten by 2030.

Frydenberg is a member of the centre-right faction of the Liberal Party.

Frydenberg has at times been the target of antisemitic attacks, such as defacing his election material with Nazi icons.

=== Abbott government ===
At the 2013 federal election, Frydenberg was re-elected with the largest swing to the Liberal Party in the seat since 1975. He was sworn in as a Parliamentary Secretary to the Prime Minister on 18 September 2013, with particular responsibility for the government's deregulation agenda. On 23 December 2014, Frydenberg was sworn in as Assistant Treasurer in a ministerial reshuffle and replaced Arthur Sinodinos, who resigned due to delays in an ICAC inquiry.

=== Turnbull government ===
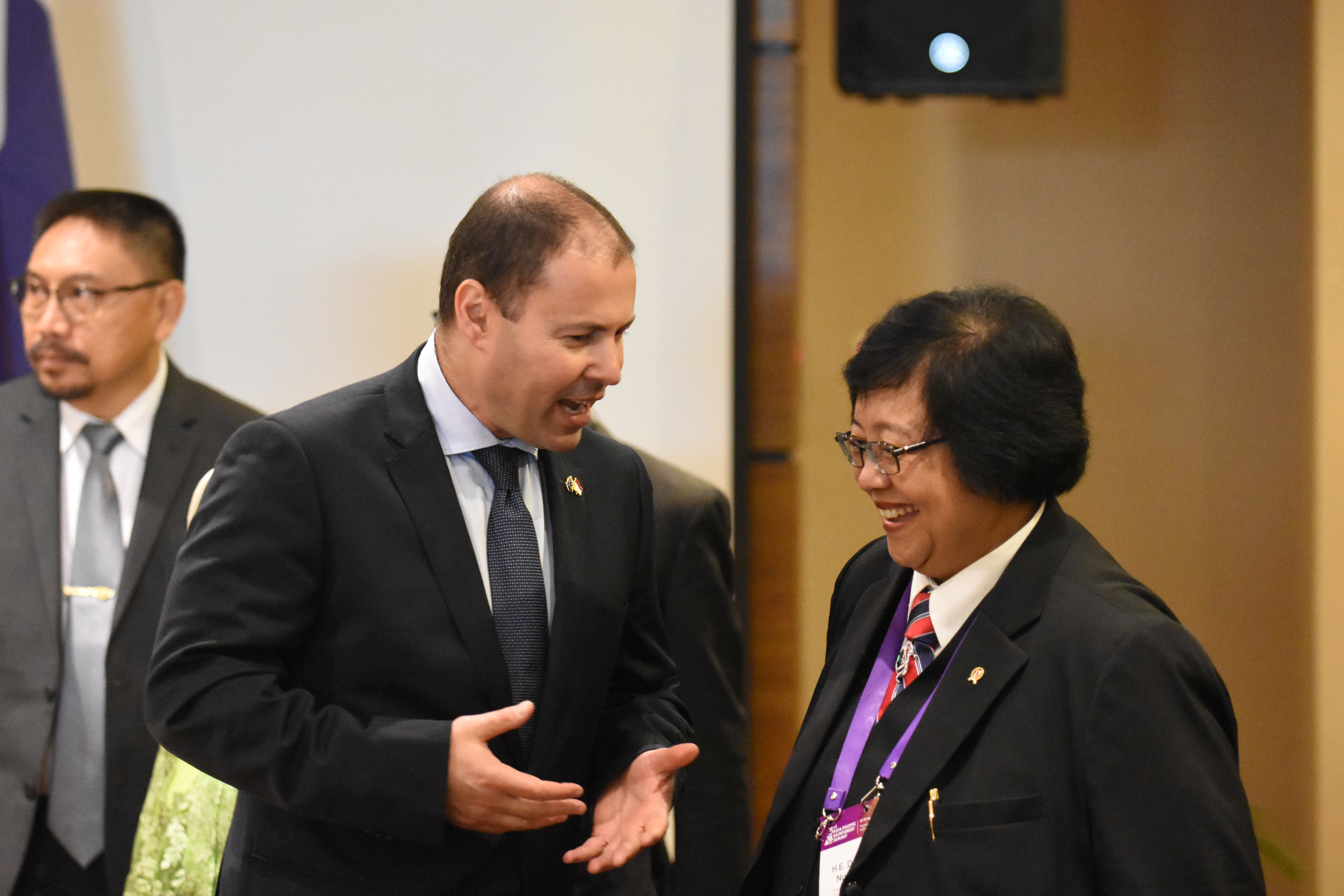
Frydenberg in April 2018 with Siti Nurbaya Bakar, Indonesia's Minister of Environment and Forestry

Following the September 2015 Liberal leadership ballot where Malcolm Turnbull became the Prime Minister, Frydenberg was appointed the Minister for Resources, Energy and Northern Australia in the First Turnbull Ministry. In February 2016, the Nationals Matt Canavan took over responsibility for Northern Australia in the rearranged ministry.

In 2015, he declared that he had switched positions regarding same-sex marriage and publicly supported same sex marriage.

With the re-election of the Turnbull government in 2016, Frydenberg became the Minister for the Environment and Energy in the Second Turnbull Ministry.

==== Parliamentary eligibility ====
In the years following the 2016 election, numerous members of parliament were deemed to be ineligible to sit in parliament due to them breaching Section 44 of the Constitution of Australia, which prohibits MPs from having dual citizenship.

In the course of the 2017-18 Australian parliamentary eligibility crisis, suggestions were raised that Frydenberg might be in breach of Section 44, as his mother and her family had come to Australia as refugees from Hungary and were stateless at the time, but subsequently Hungary conferred citizenship by descent, which may have applied to Frydenberg. Documents from the National Archives show that Frydenberg's grandparents and mother were considered "Hungarian" when they arrived in Australia, but had applied for a certificate of exemption, listing their nationality as "stateless".

Labor Party MPs were split on whether the matter should be investigated: Mark Dreyfus indicated that he would pursue the matter, but other Labor MPs requested that he desist. Ed Husic said that he felt uncomfortable with his party questioning the legal citizenship of stateless Jewish refugees escaping Europe. Mark Butler stated that it was not the party's official position to pursue the matter.

Following the 2019 election, Frydenberg was taken to court over the issue by a constituent, Michael Staindl. In March 2020, the Federal Court ruled that Frydenberg was eligible to sit in parliament. Frydenberg was awarded legal costs of $410,000 against Staindl, of which Staindl paid him $350,000. In July 2022, the Federal Court approved a settlement in which Staindl would make no further statement disparaging Frydenberg or his lawyers and no further payment would be required.

=== Morrison government ===
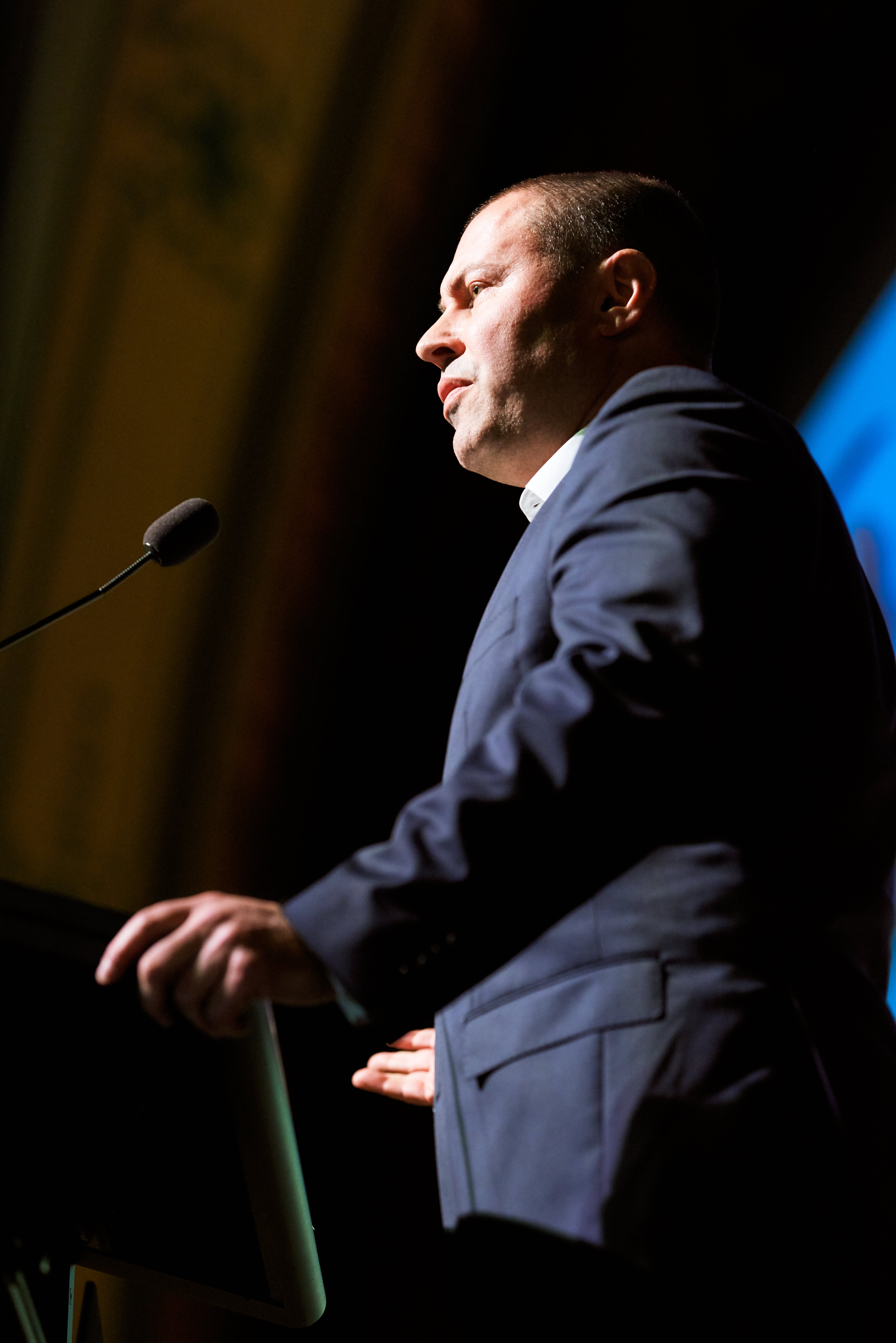
Frydenberg in April 2019 at a candidates' forum prior to the 2019 federal election

Two leadership spills were carried out by the Liberal Party in August 2018, with the second resulting in Treasurer Scott Morrison replacing Malcolm Turnbull as party leader and prime minister. Julie Bishop did not seek re-election as deputy leader, and in the resulting ballot Frydenberg won a majority in the first round with 46 votes, while Trade Minister Steven Ciobo received 20 and Health Minister Greg Hunt received 16. During Morrison's subsequent press conference, he announced that Frydenberg would replace him as treasurer.

At the 2019 federal election, he retained his seat of Kooyong with a reduced majority, following a challenge from high-profile Greens candidate Julian Burnside. Perceiving Burnside as a strong contender, the Liberal Party doubled its spending on the campaign in Kooyong, from $500,000 to $1 million. Frydenberg received a primary swing of 8.2% against him, as well as the lowest Liberal vote in Kooyong in 97 years.

In July 2019 a Kooyong resident petitioned the High Court, as Court of Disputed Returns, for a ruling that Frydenberg had been ineligible owing to foreign citizenship, being allegedly a citizen of Hungary. On 23 November 2019 it was reported that Frydenberg had received confirmation from the Hungarian government that no record could be found of Hungarian citizenship of himself or his mother. On 12 December 2019, since factual as well as legal questions remained unresolved, Justice Gordon of the High Court (who was critical of parties' delay) referred the case to the Federal Court. On 17 March 2020, a Full Court of the Federal Court found on the basis of expert evidence that Frydenberg's maternal family had lost their Hungarian citizenship upon leaving Hungary, so that he was not and had never been a Hungarian citizen, and consequently he was not ineligible to be elected to the federal parliament.

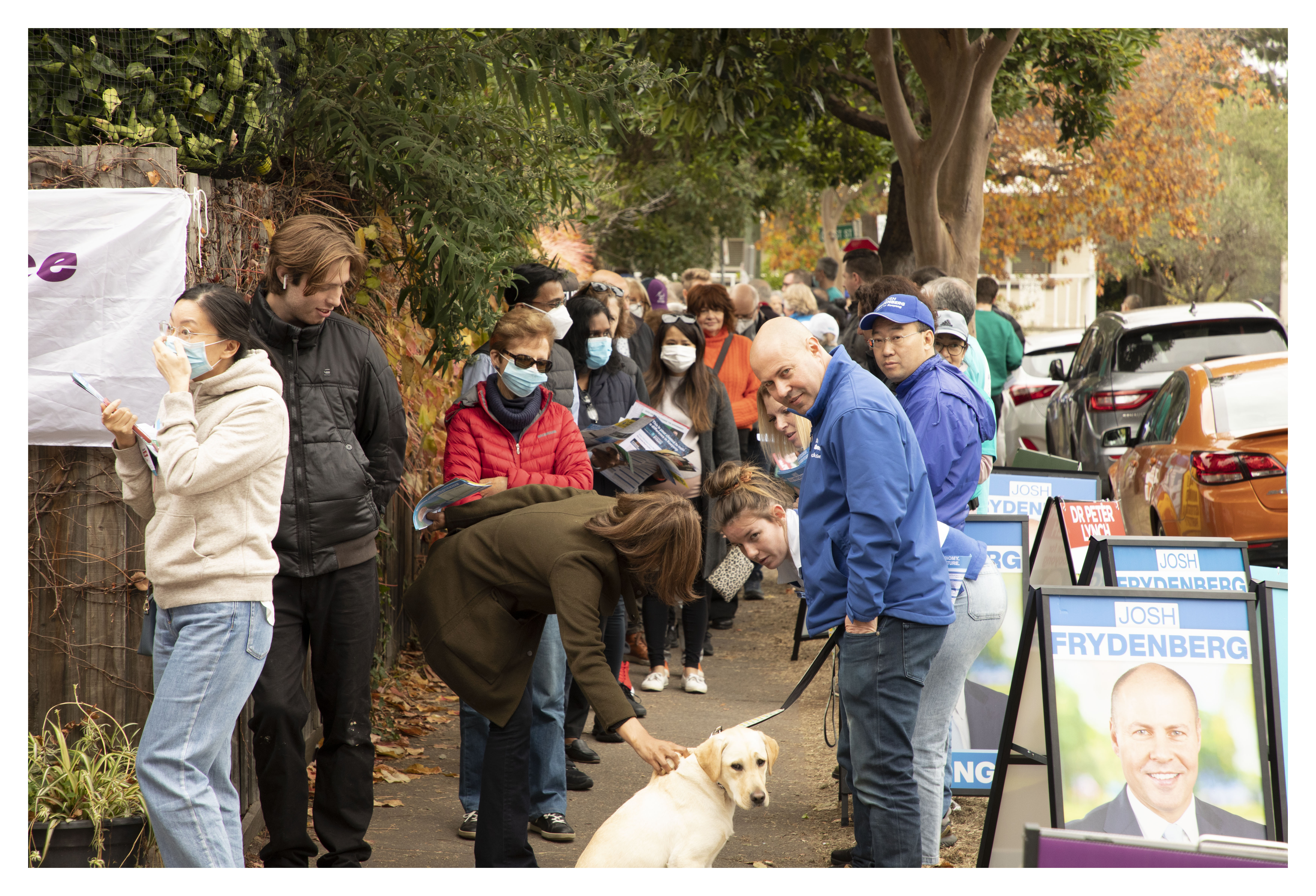
Frydenberg with volunteers at a polling place in Hawthorn at the 2022 election

In the lead-up to the 2022 election, Frydenberg's marginal seat of Kooyong faced a significant challenge by independent candidate Monique Ryan, who was a part of the "teal independent" movement. At the election on 21 May, Frydenberg lost his seat to Ryan, and he conceded defeat two days later. Frydenberg's loss marked the first time that the seat of Kooyong would not be held by the Liberal Party or its predecessors since its inception in 1901.

Frydenberg reportedly had a close working relationship with Morrison and "often stayed overnight at Kirribilli [House]". He and Morrison both stated Frydenberg also stayed with Morrison at The Lodge instead of elsewhere in his own private accommodation while in Canberra during Parliament.

==== Treasurer of Australia ====
Frydenberg delivered his first federal budget in April 2019.

== Life after politics ==
In July 2022, Frydenberg joined investment bank Goldman Sachs as a senior regional advisor for the Asia Pacific. In September 2023, Frydenberg was appointed as the chairman of Goldman Sachs’ Australian and New Zealand operations, a move which led Frydenberg to rule himself out of re-contesting Kooyong in 2025.

After the Australian Electoral Commission announced a draft redistribution for the division of Kooyong, it was widely speculated in the media that Frydenberg would attempt to become the candidate, with several members of the federal Liberal party announcing their support for his candidacy. As the Liberal party had already preselected Amelia Hamer as the candidate for Kooyong, preselection would have to begin again for Frydenberg to become the candidate. Frydenberg issued a statement in response stating he did not intend to stand at the next election.

In May 2024, Frydenberg examined the rise of antisemitism in a Sky News Australia documentary Never Again: The Fight Against Antisemitism.

In October 2026, Frydenberg released his memoir, titled A Grateful Son at the Malvern Town Hall in his old electorate of Kooyong. When interviewed by Sharri Markson of News24 about the book, Frydenberg hinted at a return to politics, adding that he supported Opposition leader Angus Taylor, but the party could not continue as normal. However, in a different interview on 60 Minutes, he criticised Taylor's leadership of the Liberal Party, stating that he contributed to the party's polling being at a record low. Despite this, Taylor said he would welcome Frydenberg if he returned to politics. One Nation MP Barnaby Joyce told Frydenberg to "cut the BS" over his ambitions to return to politics, further stating that he was "popping up like an illegal smoke shop" that was "bad for Angus Taylor's health".

== Personal life ==
Frydenberg is married and has two children.

Frydenberg is a supporter of the Carlton Football Club, and served as the club's number-one ticket holder for 2021 and 2022. In 2019, he was the Melbourne Storm number-one ticket holder.

Frydenberg's sister, Lexi Frydenberg, is a pediatrician in Melbourne

== See also ==
- List of Jewish members of Australian parliaments

== Notes ==
Parliament of Australia
Preceded by Petro Georgiou	Member of Parliament for Kooyong; 2010–2022	Succeeded by Monique Ryan
Political offices
Preceded by Arthur Sinodinos	Assistant Treasurer of Australia; 2014–2015	Succeeded by Kelly O'Dwyer
Preceded by Gary Gray	Minister for Resources; 2015–2016	Succeeded by Matt Canavan
Preceded by Greg Hunt	Minister for the Environment and Energy; 2016–2018	Succeeded by Angus Taylor
Preceded by Scott Morrison	Treasurer of Australia; 2018–2022	Succeeded by Jim Chalmers
Party political offices
Preceded by Julie Bishop	Deputy Leader of the Liberal Party; 2018–2022	Succeeded by Sussan Ley
