= List of mayors of Malvern =

This is a list of mayors, presidents and chairmen of the City of Malvern, a former local government area in Melbourne, Victoria, Australia and its precedents. It existed from 1856 until 1994 when it merged with the City of Prahran to form the new City of Stonnington.

== Council name ==
Name	Established
Gardiner Road Board	8 November 1856
Gardiner Shire Council	26 May 1871
Malvern Shire Council	15 February 1878
Malvern Borough Council	22 February 1901
Malvern Town Council	24 April 1901
Malvern City Council	30 May 1911

== Gardiner Road Board chairmen (1856–1870) ==
#	Chairman	Term
1	Gideon Rutherford	1856–1858
2	Richard McClure	1858–1862
3	William Sloggatt	1862
4	Henry Shaw	1862–1864
5	Robert Glover Benson	1842–1866
6	Thomas Gibson Henry	1866–1868
7	Henry Middleton	1868–1869
8	Robert Glover Benson	1869–1870
9	Henry Middleton	1870
10	John George Heywood	1870

== Gardiner Shire presidents (1871–1877) ==
#	Chairman	Term
11	John George Heywood	1871
12	James Ferguson	1871–1872
13	James Munro	1872–1873
14	John Bellin	1873–1874
15	Robert Edward Lewis	1874–1876
16	Robert Glover Benson	1876–1877

== Malvern Shire presidents (1877–1900) ==
#	President	Term
17	Robert Edward Lewis	1877–1878
18	James Lorimer	1878–1880
19	Robert Glover Benson	1880–1881
20	John George Heywood	1881–1883
21	William Woodmason	1883–1884
22	Edward Sidney Edsall	1884–1885
23	Robert Glover Benson	1885–1887
24	Alfred Edward Clarke	1887–1889
25	Robert Glover Benson	1889–1890
26	Alexander McKinley	1890–1893
27	William Knox	1893–1895
28	Donald Munro	1895–1896
29	Thomas Carroll	1896–1898
30	Adolphus Francis Alway	1898–1899
31	Joseph Voysey	1899–1900

== Malvern City mayors (1900–1994) ==
#	Mayor	Term
32	Alexander McKinley	1900–1901
33	Louis William Holmes	1901–1902
34	Eli Parslow	1902–1903
35	William Valentine Bailey	1903–1904
36	Walter Henry Lewis	1904–1905
37	Albert Joseph Weller	1905–1906
38	William Haslam Edgar	1906–1907
39	John Ellis	1907–1908
40	Alexander James Browne Dunlop	1909–1910
41	Alexander McKinley	1910–1911
42	Rupert de Clare T Wilks	1911–1912
43	Frank Herbert Goode Cornwall	1912–1913
44	Sydney Herbert Wilson	1913–1914
45	William Rogers Thomson	1914–1915
46	Albert Joseph Weller	1915–1916
47	Rupert de Clare T Wilks	1916–1917
48	Ernest Ingram Thompson	1917–1918
49	Alexander McKinley	1918–1919
50	Louis William Holmes	1919–1920
51	Frederick H. Francis	1920–1921
52	James D. Evans	1921–1922
53	Robert N. Corney	1922–1923
54	Charles J. Waters	1923–1924
55	Henry T. Matthews	1924–1925
56	Robert W. Sylvester	1925–1926
57	William Stewart Turnbull	1926–1927
58	Harry George Wilmot	1927–1928
59	Samuel Hattam	1928–1929
60	George Taylor	1929–1930
61	Charles J. Waters	1930–1932
62	James D. Evans	1931–1932
63	Milton F. W. Gray	1932–1933
64	George H. Kilborn	1933–1934
65	Leonard A. Righetti	1934–1935
66	Frank Alway	1935–1936
67	David Hyslop	1936–1937
68	Thomas H. King	1937–1938
69	Leonard A. Righetti	1938–1940
70	Milton F. W. Gray	1940–1943
71	George H. Kilborn	1943–1944
72	John Johnson	1944–1945
73	Stanley E. Stevens	1945–1946
74	Richard G. Moss	1946–1947
75	Wilfred W. Cummins	1947–1948
76	John H. Snaddon	1948–1949
77	Leslie E. Montague	1949–1950
78	Leslie E. Montague	1949–1950
79	John Johnson	1950–1951
80	Thomas H. King	1952–1952
81	Stanley E. Stevens	1952–1953
82	John Johnson	1953–1954
83	William Wilson	1954–1956
84	Stanley E. Stevens	1956–1957
85	Arthur B. Morgan	1957–1958
86	Sydney G. Hayes	1958–1959
87	John Johnson	1959–1960
88	James T. Firman	1960–1961
89	Edward D. Armstrong	1961–1963
90	Ernest V. Johnson	1963–1964
91	Colin R. Cameron	1964–1965
92	Douglas E. Muir	1965–1966
93	Thomas H. King	1966–1968
94	Stuart Winston Hall	1968–1969
95	Hubert T. H. Healy	1969–1970
96	Julius C. Pollack	1970–1972
97	Thomas H. King	1972–1973
98	Hubert T H Healy	1973–1975
99	Malcolm Davison	1975–1976
100	Ray B. Cox	1976–1978
101	Julius C. Pollack	1978–1979
102	Ann Morrow	1979–1980
103	Hubert T. H. Healy	1980–1981
104	Max M. J. Dumais	1981–1983
105	Ross E. Heale	1983–1984
106	Marie Quinn	1984–1986
107	Raymond C. Lang	1986–1988
108	Janice Carpenter	1988–1989
109	George Pepperell	1989–1990
110	Barry Fenton	1990–1991
111	Elizabeth Shalless	1991–1992
112	Claude Ullin	1992–1993
113	Raymond C. Lang	1993–1994

== Stonnington City mayors (from 1996) ==
- List of mayors of Stonnington

== See also ==
- Malvern Town Hall
- List of mayors of Prahran
