= Prahran Town Hall =

Civic building in Melbourne, Australia

Coordinates: 37°50′59″S 144°59′35″E

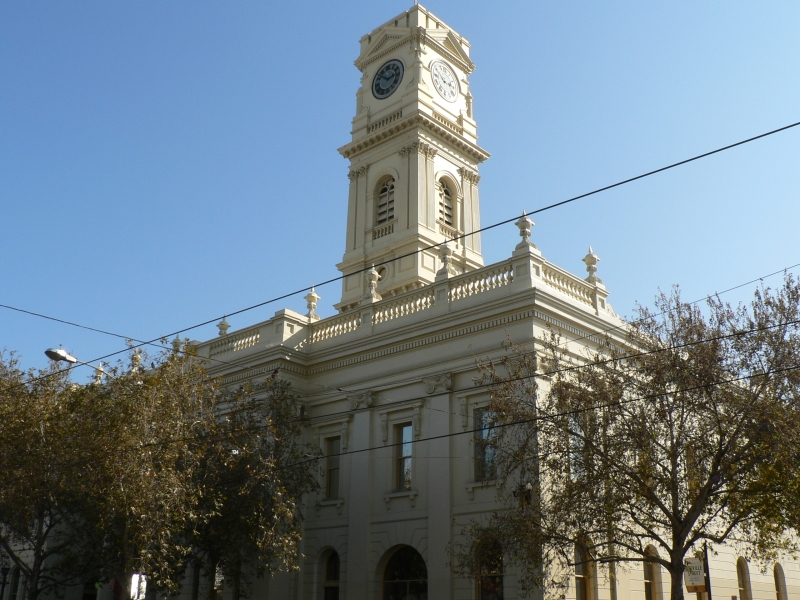
Prahran Town Hall

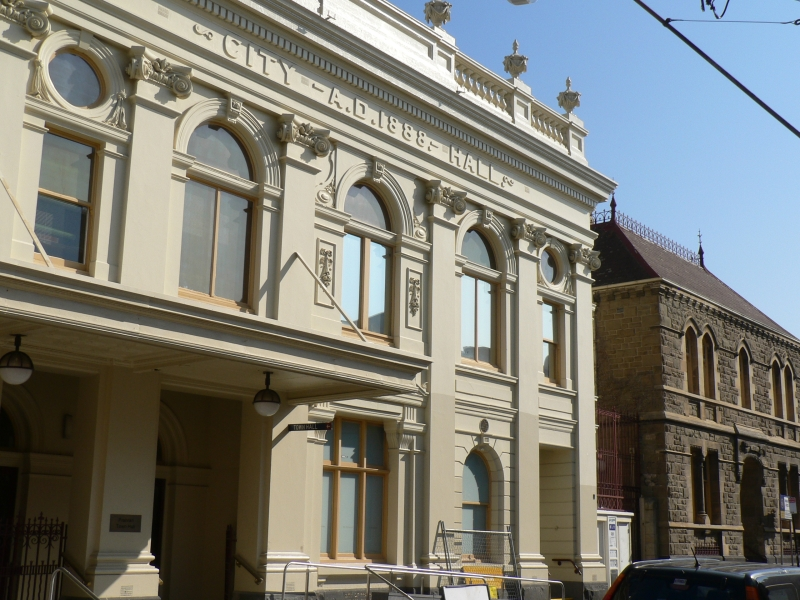
Prahran City Hall

Prahran Town Hall is a civic building located on the corner of Chapel Street and Greville Street in Prahran, a suburb of Melbourne, Australia.

After the amalgamation of the City of Prahran with the City of Malvern in 1994 to form the City of Stonnington, the Town Hall now houses services including the Greville Street Library.

The original Town Hall was built in 1861 to the design of local architects Crouch and Wilson in the Italianate style of Victorian architecture popular in Melbourne at the time, including Italian Renaissance inspired interior spaces. The building was extended in 1888 to include a City Hall in a similar style.

The clock tower was designed by Charles D'Ebro and built in 1890 above the municipal offices and council chambers for the former City of Prahran. In the 1960s, the decorative tower was truncated.

== See also ==
- List of Town Halls in Melbourne
- City of Stonnington
- List of mayors of Stonnington
- List of mayors of Prahran
