= List of mayors of Stonnington =

This is a list of mayors of the City of Stonnington local government area in Melbourne, Victoria, Australia, which was formed in 1994 by the amalgamation of the City of Malvern and the City of Prahran.

== Commissioners (1994-1996) ==
Commissioners	Term
Neil Smith (Chief Commissioner)	1994–1996
Anne Murphy	1994–1996
Reg Weller (Died in Office)	1994–1995
Des Bethke	1995–1996

== Mayors ==
=== 1996–present ===
From 1996 until 2004, the annual election of the mayor for the following 12 months occurred in March. New legislation effective from 2004 onwards changed the date of the election of the mayor to November or December. There was a truncated transitional term of office from March to November 2004.

#	Party	Mayor (Ward)	Term
1	Independent	John Chandler (Chapel)	1996–1997
2	Independent	Adam Held (Armadale)	1997–1998
3	Independent	Christopher Gahan OAM (Hawksburn)	1998–1999
4	Independent	Annette Stockman (Como)	1999–2000
5	Independent	Claude Ullin (Armadale)	2000–2001
6	Independent	Leon Hill (Orrong)	2001–2002
7	Independent	Sally Davis (Hedgeley Dene)	2002–2003
8	Independent	Melina Sehr (Greville)	2003–2004*
9	Independent	Sarah Davies (North)	2004–2005
10	Independent	Anne O'Shea (East)	2005–2006
11	Independent	John Chandler (North)	2006–2007
12	Independent	Claude Ullin (South)	2007–2009
13	Liberal	Tim Smith (North)	2009–2010
14	Independent	Melina Sehr (South)	2010–2011
15	Independent	John Chandler (North)	2011–2012
16	Liberal	Matthew Koce (North)	2012–2013
17	Independent	Adrian Stubbs (East)	2013–2014
18	Independent	Melina Sehr (South)	2014–2015
19	Independent	Claude Ullin (South)	2015–2016
20	Labor	Jami Klisaris (East)	2016–2017
21	Independent	Steven Stefanopoulos (South)	2017–2020
22	Independent	Kate Hely (North)	2020–2021
23	Labor	Jami Klisaris (East)	2021–2023
24	Independant	Joe Gianfriddo (East)	2023–2024
25	Independent	Melina Sehr (Greville)	2024–2026
26	Independent	Steven Stefanopoulos OAM (Wattletree)	2026–2027

== Deputy mayors ==
=== 2019–present ===
The first Deputy Mayor was appointed in 2019.

#	Party	Deputy Mayor (Ward)	Term
1	Independent	John Chandler OAM (North)	2019–2020
2	Independent	Melina Sehr (South)	2020–2023
3	Greens	Mike Scott (South)	2023–2024
4	Liberal	Tom Humphries (Toorak)	2024–2025
5	Independent	Samantha Choudhury (Orrong)	2025–2026

== See also ==
- Malvern Town Hall
- List of mayors of Malvern
- List of mayors of Prahran
