= Charles D'Ebro =

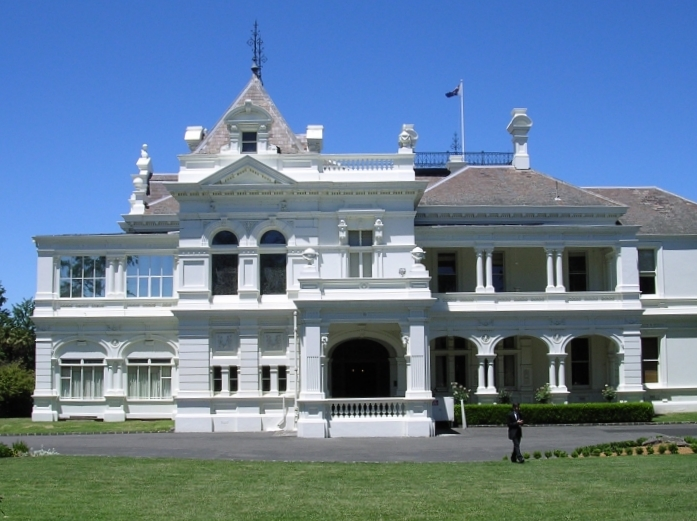
Stonnington mansion is an example of Charles D'Ebro architectural work. The City of Stonnington was named for the mansion.

Charles Abraham D'Ebro (1850–1920) was an Australian architect who designed many important buildings in Melbourne, Victoria, Australia during the late Victorian and early Edwardian periods. Many of these buildings are now preserved under heritage laws. From 1881 to 1885, he enjoyed a very productive partnership with John Grainger, the designer of the Princes Bridge, with whom he had emigrated to Adelaide in 1877.

== Biography ==
D'Ebro was born 27 October 1850 at 10 Bury Street, Bloomsbury, London, the posthumous son of Charles D'Almandos D'Ebro, Baron and Chevalier, who died 16 August 1850, and Frances, the daughter of the artist Justin McArthy. She remarried 30 May 1853, becoming the second wife of Abraham Cooper (1789–1868).

D'Ebro married Blanche Mary Tracy (1859–1943) in 1891, and they had a daughter Ethel (Essa) in 1892. He apparently committed suicide in Perth, Western Australia on 23 June 1920.

== Attributed works ==
- (1887) Auckland Art Gallery, Auckland Main gallery, with John Grainger
- (1887) Fremantle Town Hall, Victorian Free Style (Classical), with John Grainger
- (1889) Moorakyne, the former mansion home of merchant John Grice
- (1890) Stonington (also spelt Stonnington) of Malvern in the Italian Renaissance style, mansion & stables
- (1890) Prahran Town Hall Clock Tower, Prahran, Melbourne
- (1891) Richmond Power Station
- (1891) The Winfield Building in the Queen Anne style, with Richard Speight which forms part of a notable Collins Street streetscape
- (1901–1902) Former Gollin and Company Building in the Queen Anne style. Bourke Street, Melbourne
- (1904) Adelaide Steamship Company building in the Palazzo style (destroyed 1980)
- (1907–1908) Scottish House in the Palazzo style, on William Street, Melbourne.

== Gallery ==
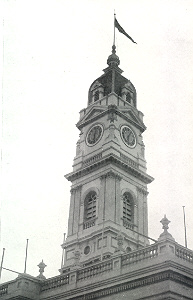
Prahran Town Hall Clock Tower (since modified)

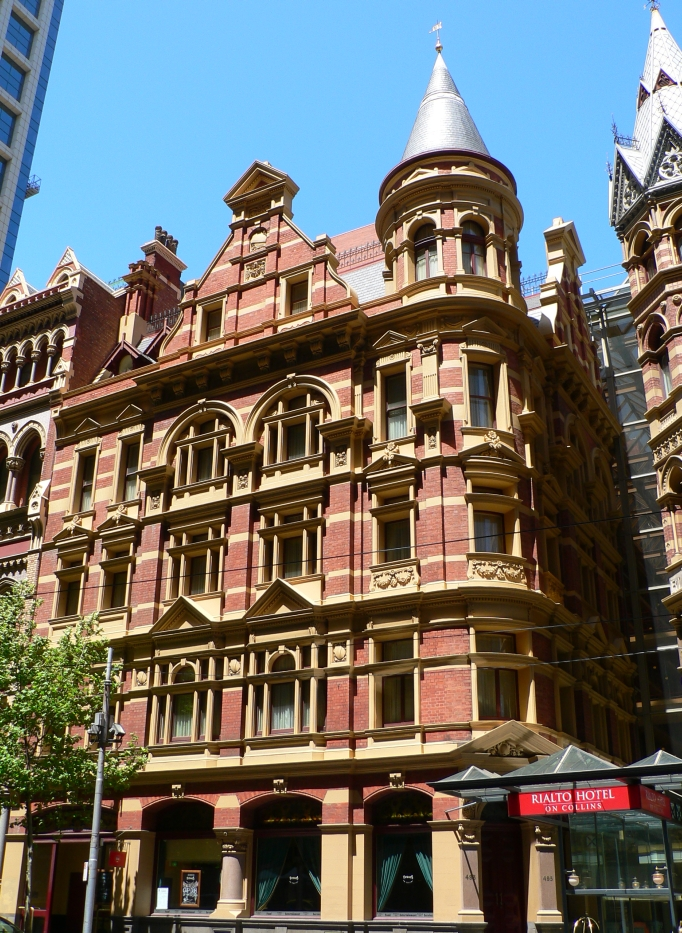
Winfield Building in the Queen Anne style

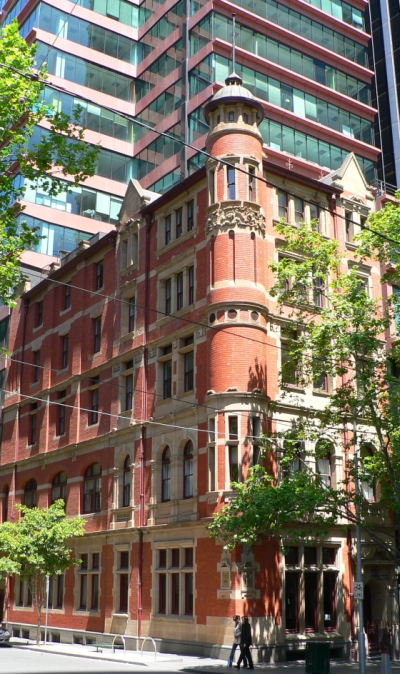
Former Gollin & Company buildings

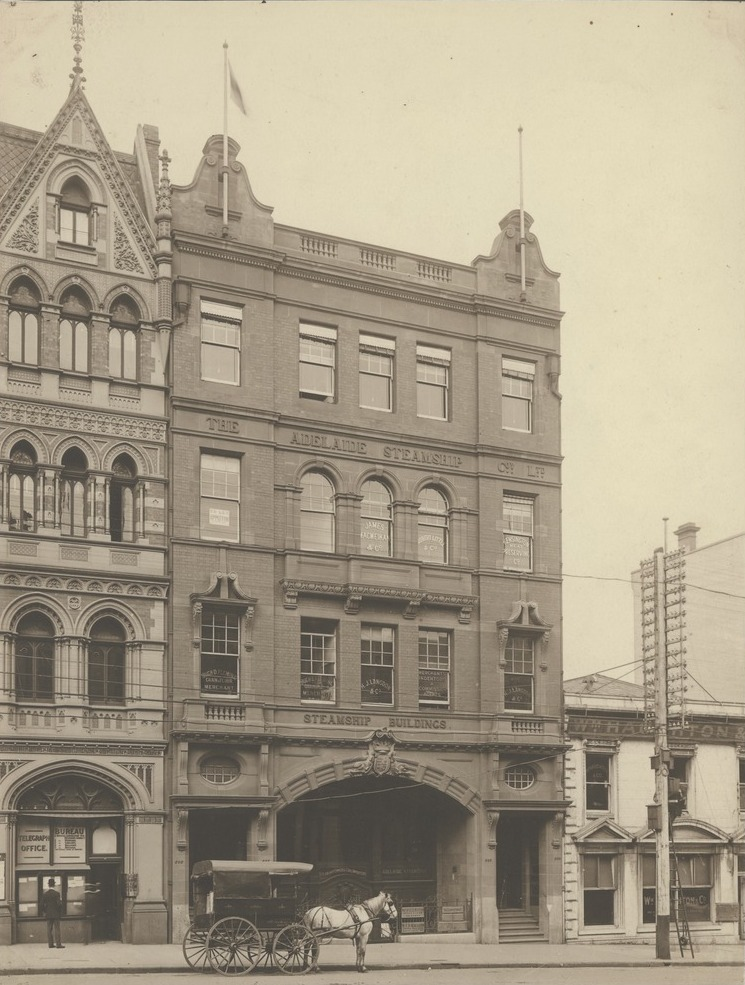
The Adelaide Steamship Company building

== Resource ==
- City of Stonnington history City of Stonnington
