= Henry Gooch (disambiguation) =

Henry Gooch may refer to:

- Henry Gooch, British politician
- Sir Henry Daniel Gooch, 2nd Baronet (1841–1897) of the Gooch baronets
- Henry Mansfield Gooch, Mayor of Prahran, Australia
