= List of mayors of Prahran =

This is a list of mayors and chairmen of the City of Prahran, a former local government area in Melbourne, Victoria, Australia and its precedents. It existed from 1854 until 1994 when it merged with the City of Malvern to form the new City of Stonnington.

== Council name ==
Name	Established
Prahran Road Board	17 May 1854
Prahran Municipality	24 April 1855
Prahran Borough Council	1 October 1863
Prahran Town Council	13 May 1870
Prahran City Council	27 May 1879

== Prahran chairmen (1856–1863) ==
#	Chairman	Term
1	Frederick J Sargood	1856–1857
2	J Cunnington	1857–1858 (part)
3	Frederick J Sargood	1857–1858 (part)
4	J Cunnington	1858–1859 (part)
5	Francis John Sydney Stephen	1858–1859 (part)
6	Daniel Rutter Long	1859–1861
7	James Wisewould	1861–1862
8	R McClure	1862–1863 (part)
9	John Branscombe Crews	1862–1863 (part)

== Prahran mayors (1863–1994) ==
#	Mayor	Term
10	John Branscombe Crews	1863–1865 (part)
11	James Stodart	1864–1865 (part)
12	Joshua Snowball	1864–1866 (part)
13	George Young	1866–1867 (part)
14	Edward Luke Vail	1866–1868 (part)
15	George Young	1867–1869 (part)
16	William Henry Lacey	1868–1870 (part)
17	Charles Ogg	1869–1871 (part)
18	Robert Murray Smith	1870–1872 (part)
19	George Lewis	1871–1873 (part)
20	Charles Hipwell	1872–1874 (part)
21	George Young	1873–1874 (part)
22	Joseph Harris	1874–1876
23	Edward J Dixon	1876–1877
24	William Bowen	1877–1878
25	Samuel Willis	1878–1879
26	Thomas Arkle	1879–1880
27	James Hole	1880–1881
28	M H Davies	1881–1882
29	John Turner	1882–1883
30	William Templeton	1883–1884
31	George W Taylor	1884–1885
32	T B Muntz	1885–1886
33	Robert Arthur Forbes	1886–1887
34	John Beatty	1887–1888
35	Henry Osment	1888–1889
36	William Fuller	1889–1890
37	Thomas Ellis	1890–1891
38	John Henry Maddock	1891–1892
39	George Lindsay Skinner	1892–1893
40	William Davies	1893–1894
41	Thomas Luxton	1894–1897
42	Robert Arthur Forbes	1897–1898
43	Thomas Simmons	1898–1899
44	Henry Mansfield Gooch	1899–1901
45	Thomas Luxton	1901–1902
46	William Densham	1902–1904
47	Sydney Albert Chambers	1904–1906
48	Josiah James Walter Flintoft	1906–1907
49	Henry Upton	1907–1908 (part)
50	Frank Temple S Dobson	1907–1909 (part)
51	Edward Naylor	1908–1910 (part)
52	John Rupert G Nicolson	1910–1911
53	Herbert Arthur Austin Embling	1911–1912
54	Thomas Gemmell Logan Scott	1912–1913
55	Ernest Horatio Willis	1913–1914
56	George Neeve Heywood	1914–1915
57	William Matthew McIlwrick	1915–1916
58	Herbert Arthur Austin Embling	1916–1918
59	Ernest Horatio Willis	1918–1919
60	George Neeve Heywood	1919–1920
61	Josiah James Walter Flintoft	1920–1921
62	Alfred Holmes Woodfull	1921–1922
63	William Thomas Chambers	1922–1923
64	William Benjamin Lumley	1923–1924
65	John Charles Pickford	1924–1925
66	Albert Armytage Holdsworth	1925–1926
67	Josiah James Walter Flintoft	1926–1927
68	Frederick W Harvey	1927–1928
69	Alfred Holmes Woodfull	1928–1929
70	William Matthew McIlwrick	1929–1930
71	John McDonald Ellis	1930–1932
72	Alfred William Cole	1932–1934
73	William Musson Flintoft	1934–1935
74	Robert James Grant	1935–1936
75	Albert William Sterck	1936–1937
76	Henry Rudolf David	1937–1938
77	Harry Landen	1938–1939
78	Maurice Gabriel Sloman	1939–1940
79	Alfred Holmes Woodfull	1940–1941
80	William Matthew McIlwrick	1941–1943
81	John McDonald Ellis	1943–1945
82	Alfred William Cole	1945–1946
83	Martin Patrick Smith	1946–1947
84	Ernest Peter McMaster	1947–1948
85	George Ernest Furnell	1948–1949
86	Emlyn Leighton Jones	1949–1950
87	Thomas Alfred Thomas	1950–1951
88	Horace Rostill Petty	1951–1952
89	Leslie John Hay Buddle	1952–1953
90	Charles Sherwin Gawith	1953–1954
91	Spencer T Harper	1954–1955
92	Martin Patrick Smith	1955–1956
93	George Ernest Furnell	1956–1957
94	C H A Carty-Salmon	1957–1958
95	Murray Sutherland Peden	1958–1959
96	Thomas Alfred Thomas	1959–1960
97	Charles Sherwin Gawith	1960–1961
98	Emlyn Leighton Jones	1961–1962
99	C H A Carty-Salmon	1962–1963
100	Francis Ignatius Smyth	1963–1964
101	Norman Dobie R Maxwell	1964–1965
102	George Thomas Gahan	1965–1966
103	Martin Patrick Smith	1966–1967
104	Richard H Matthews	1967–1968
105	Charles Lux	1968–1969
106	Christopher Charles E Gahan	1969–1970
107	George Thomas Gahan	1970–1971
108	William Mayfield Dane	1971–1973
109	Frederick T Farrall	1973–1974
110	Colin John Bell	1974–1975
111	Peter John Hegarty	1975–1976
112	Keith Victor Nicholls	1976–1977
113	William Maurice F Drever	1977–1979
114	Robert Wilson-Reid	1979–1980
115	Harry Gregory	1980–1981
116	Christopher Charles E Gahan	1981–1982
117	David Cameron Cran	1982–1983
118	Basil Theophilos	1983–1984
119	Mary Duffy	1984–1985
120	Dieter Habicht	1985–1986
121	Neil Graham Barker	1986–1987
122	Wendy A Spry	1987–1988
123	John V Chandler	1988–1989
124	John V Velos	1989–1990
125	Leonie T Burke	1990–1992
125	Sandra A Gatehouse	1992–1993
125	Robert W Gill	1993–1994

== See also ==
- Prahran Town Hall
- List of mayors of Malvern
- List of mayors of Stonnington
