= Piccadilly Cinema, Birmingham =

Former cinema in Birmingham, England

Coordinates: 52.4578376°N 1.8691651°W

The old Piccadilly Cinema building is located in Sparkhill, Birmingham, England, and is situated on the Stratford Road.

It first opened in May 1930 under the name the Piccadilly Super Cinema and was designed by Harold Seymore Scott.

Its Compton Pipe Theatre Organ is now in Stonnington City Centre (formerly Malvern Town Hall) in Malvern, Victoria, Australia.
