= William Flintoft =

Bill Flintoft
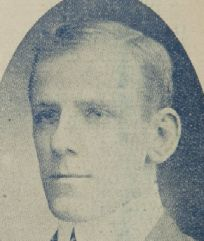

Personal information
- Full name: William Morris Musson Flintoft
- Born: 20 March 1889; South Yarra, Victoria
- Died: 3 May 1951 (aged 62); Melbourne, Victoria
- Original team: Prahran College / South Yarra
- Position: Centre / Half forward flank

Playing career^{1}
Years	Club	Games (Goals)
1909–1912	Melbourne	42 (18)
1913	St Kilda	1 (0)
- ^{1} Playing statistics correct to the end of 1913.

William Morris Musson Flintoft (20 March 1889 – 3 May 1951) was an Australian rules football player with the Melbourne Football Club and the St Kilda Football Club in the Victorian Football League (VFL). He played Victorian Premier Cricket for the Melbourne Cricket Club. Flintoft also served in the First Australian Imperial Force in World War I. In later life Flintoft was Mayor of Prahran, on the Committee of the Melbourne Cricket Club, and on the Board of the Melbourne Football Club, serving as president of the latter for three years.

== Early life ==
Flintoft was born in South Yarra, Victoria, the son of Josiah James Walter Flintoft, a three-time mayor of Prahran, and Fanny (née Michell), on 20 March 1889. He was educated at Prahran College and he became a clerk.

== Sporting career ==
=== Football ===
Flintoft was recruited from the South Yarra Football Club, at the age of 19, and made his VFL debut for the Melbourne Football Club in round 3 of the 1909 season. His career with Melbourne lasted from 1909 to 1912, playing 42 games and kicking 18 goals. Described as "the Beau Brummell of League football", Flintoft played in the centre and was known for being "dapper on and off the field". Flintoft left Melbourne at the end of the 1912 season and joined St Kilda for the 1913 season. However, his time with St Kilda was unsuccessful, playing only one game in the lone season he was at the club. The 1913 season was Flintoft's last in the VFL.

=== Cricket ===
Flintoft was an accomplished cricketer, playing Victorian Premier Cricket, the top level of cricket in Victoria, with the Melbourne Cricket Club (MCC). He played for the MCC from 1909 to 1927, with a hiatus from 1915 to 1919, in order to serve in World War I.

== World War I ==
Flintoft enlisted in the First Australian Imperial Force, to serve in World War I, on 2 August 1915. He began his service as a Second Lieutenant in the 58th Battalion, with which he would remain for the entirety of World War I, and embarked from Melbourne, Victoria on 16 December 1916, on the HMAT A7 Medic. The 58th Battalion was attached to the 5th Australian Division and saw action in Egypt and on the Western Front, fighting in France and Belgium. Flintoft fought in many of the deadliest battles of World War I, such as Fromelles, Amiens and Mont St. Quentin. Flintoft, however, remained unharmed throughout World War I, was promoted to the rank of Lieutenant, and returned to Australia on 3 March 1919.

== Later life ==
Flintoft was Mayor of Prahran from 1934 to 1935. In 1934, Flintoft's wife gave birth to a son. He served on the board of the Melbourne Football Club and took over from Joe Blair as president of the club in 1947, serving in the position until 1949, when Albert Chadwick took over the presidency. During his time as president, Melbourne won the 1948 premiership. He was awarded life membership of the club in 1945. Flintoft was also on the Committee of the Melbourne Cricket Club, from 1937 until his death on 3 May 1951. Flintoft was survived by his wife and two sons.
