= Windsor, Victoria =

Windsor
- Suburb
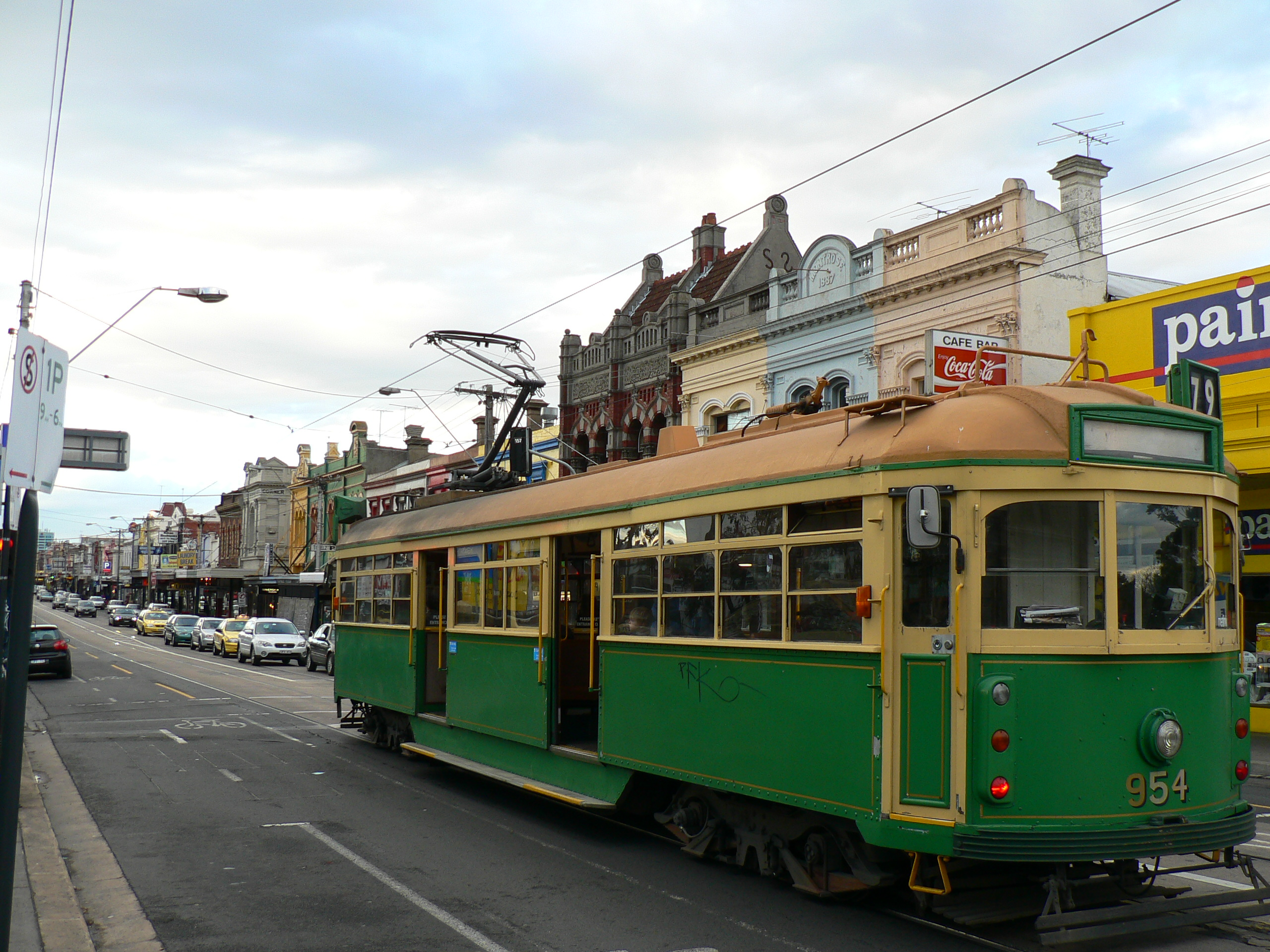
- Tram on Chapel Street stopping at Windsor railway station

- Interactive map of Windsor
- Coordinates: 37.854°S 144.988°E
- Country: Australia
- State: Victoria
- City: Melbourne
- LGAs: City of Port Phillip; City of Stonnington
- Location: 7 km (4.3 mi) from Melbourne
- Established: 1860s

Government
  - State electorate: Prahran
  - Federal division: MacNamara

Area
  - Total: 1 km^{2} (0.39 sq mi)
- Elevation: 24 m (79 ft)

Population
  - Total: 7,273 (2021 census)
  - Density: 7,000/km^{2} (19,000/sq mi)
- Postcode: 3181
Suburbs around Windsor
Melbourne CBD	Prahran	Prahran
Melbourne CBD	Windsor	Prahran
St Kilda	St Kilda East	St Kilda East

Windsor is an inner suburb in Melbourne, Victoria, Australia, 5 km south-east of Melbourne's Central Business District, located within the Cities of Port Phillip and Stonnington local government areas. Windsor recorded a population of 7,273 at the 2021 census.

Windsor is bounded by Dandenong Road, St Kilda Road, Williams Road and High Street.

== History ==
Known at first as Prahran South, the suburb's name was changed to Windsor in 1891, after Windsor, Berkshire. It is often incorrectly referred to as Prahran, Windsor's northern neighbour. In the past, Windsor was within the City of Prahran's boundaries and many institutions still refer to this.

A Windsor Post Office opened in 1856, but was renamed St Kilda in 1858. The Windsor Post Office in the area opened in 1886.

== Demographics ==
62.1% were born in Australia. Other countries of birth were England 5%, Greece 3.1%, New Zealand 3.1%, China (excluding Taiwan & SARs) 1.5% and Ireland 1.2%.

== Today ==
Although Stonnington's smallest suburb, Windsor has its own bank, supermarket and historic pubs, along with a growing number of independent clothing stores, restaurants, bars, lounges and cafés. Windsor contains a diverse mix of housing, including medium density apartments, Victorian terrace housing and a high-rise public housing tower.

The Prahran campus of Swinburne University used to be located just south of High Street in Windsor, but this is now Melbourne Polytechnic – Prahran Campus, although it is actually in Windsor. The National Institute of Circus Arts is in Green Street, Windsor.

The painkiller Aspro was invented by the chemist George Nicholas in Windsor. Nuttelex margarine was also manufactured in Windsor for many years but production later shifted to Knoxfield.

== Landmarks ==
The suburb has many landmarks, including the historic Presentation Convent (now the secondary school St Mary's College), the Windsor Primary School, old post office, Telstra exchange tower and a campus of Swinburne University. In recent times, the large Empire Cinemas, converted into a nightclub, was gutted by fire before eventually being demolished and replaced by high-rise apartments, also named the Empire.

The remains of one side of Punt Road at the Windsor end contains one of Windsor's lesser shopping strips, called Little Windsor on Punt.

The suburb also features new design, including the award-winning Windsor Fire station, by architects Edmund and Corrigan. In Raleigh Street are the K2 apartments, a Sustainable architecture built in 2006, to the design of Hansen Yuncken and features passive solar design, recycled and sustainable materials, photovoltaic cells, wastewater treatment, rainwater collection and solar hot water.

There are many remaining hotels in the suburb, including the popular Windsor Castle and The Windsor Alehouse.

The new Prahran High School has been built on part of the grounds of what is now Melbourne Polytechnic. The new High School is a vertical school consisting of 4 levels with a gymnasium on the top floor. The school officially opened in 2019.

== Transport ==
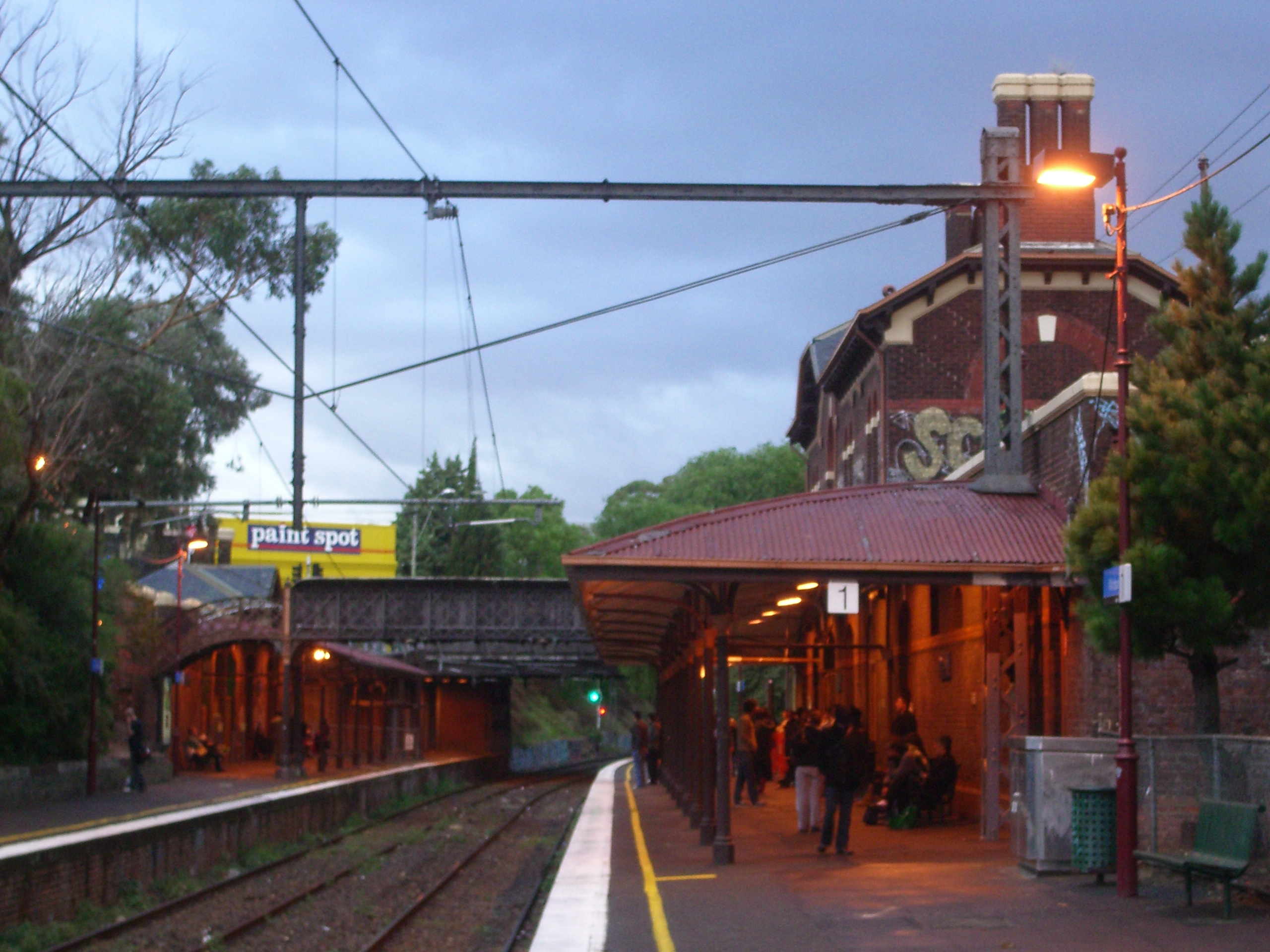
Windsor railway station

Windsor is serviced by a number of trams along Dandenong Road, High Street and Chapel Street (routes 5, 6, 64, and 78) with Metro Trains Melbourne's Sandringham railway line takes commuters from Windsor station to the CBD in 10 minutes. The 216 and 219 bus routes operate along Williams Road.

Punt Road is one of the main bus thoroughfares in Melbourne, with route 246 passing through the western side of the suburb.

== Notable people ==
- Gustave Slapoffski (1862–1951), conductor, lived and died in Windsor.

== Community ==
The Australia Western Thrace Turkish Association (located at 103–109 Union Street) is a community hub for the Western Thrace Turkish people, offering a prayer room and cultural programs, with its formal association established in 1975.

== See also ==
- City of Prahran – Windsor was previously within this former local government area.
