= Glenferrie Road =

Road in Melbourne, Australia

Glenferrie Road Victoria
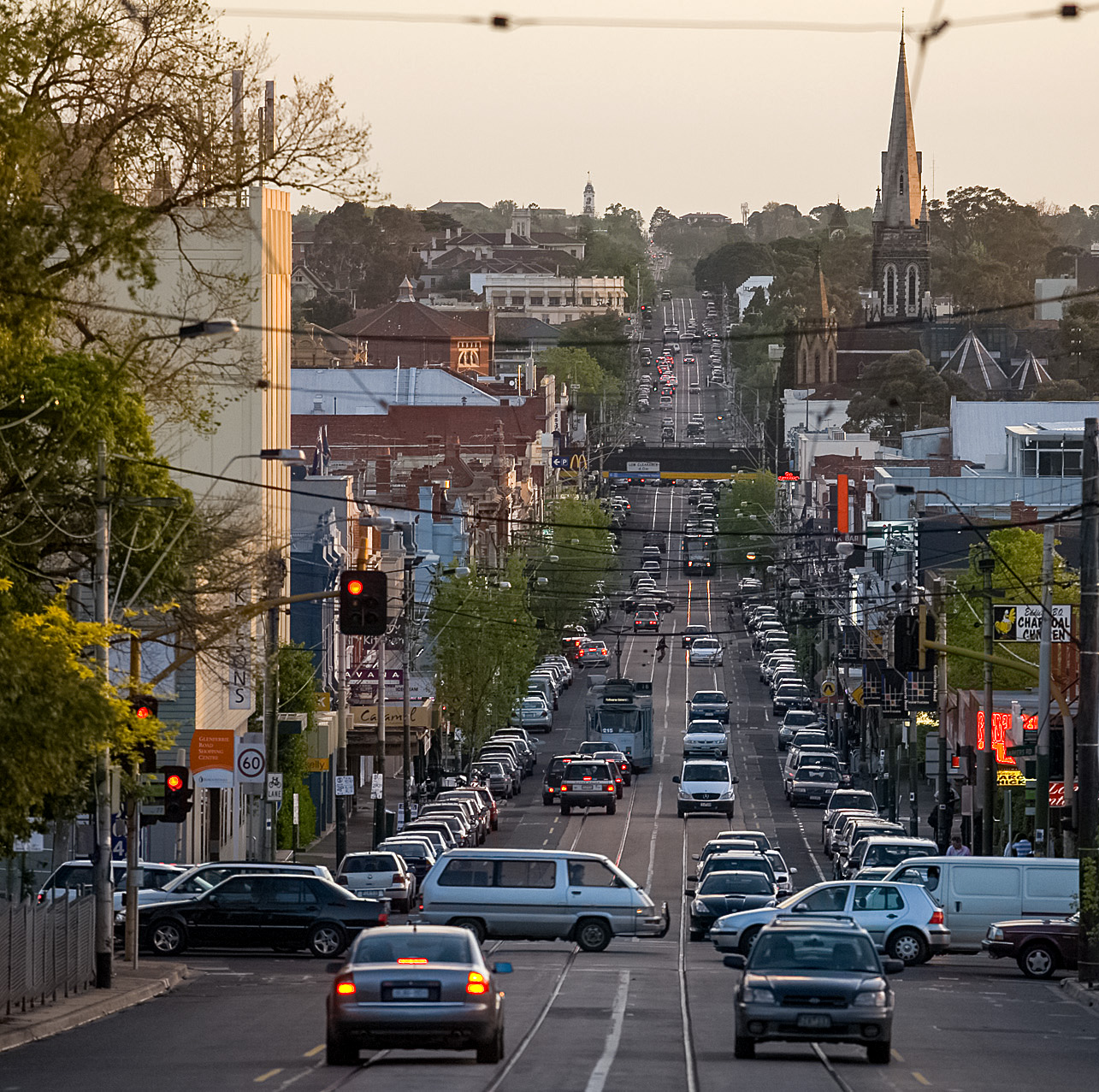
- Looking south down Glenferrie Road, from the hill in Kew, through Hawthorn, with Barkers Road in the foreground
- Coordinates: 37.807716°S 145.038151°E (North end); 37.866271°S 145.027592°E (South end)

General information
- Type: Road
- Length: 6.6 km (4.1 mi)
- Route number(s): Metro Route 19 (1965–present)

Major junctions
- North end: Cotham Road; Kew, Melbourne
- Barkers Road; Burwood Road; Riversdale Road; Toorak Road; High Street
- South end: Dandenong Road; Caulfield North, Melbourne

Location(s)
- Major suburbs: Hawthorn, Kooyong

Glenferrie Road is a major north–south thoroughfare in Melbourne, Victoria, Australia. It runs from Kew to Caulfield North, and includes major shopping districts at both Hawthorn and Malvern. There are a number of rail transport options on Glenferrie Road and also some landmarks.

== Route ==
Glenferrie Road starts at the intersection with Cotham Road as a dual-lane, single-carriageway road, sharing tram tracks along its entire length, heading south under the Lilydale railway line through Hawthorn, under CityLink tollway and across the Glen Waverley railway line in Kooyong, over the Frankston railway line in Malvern and eventually ending at Dandenong Road on the northern edge of Caulfield North.

== History ==
Glenferrie Road was named after Glen Ferrie, an 1840s property south of Gardiners Creek, owned by Peter Ferrie. Glenferrie Road was planned in 1839 and officially opened in 1863. In 1860 the council wished to build the council building on Glenferrie Road; despite petitions from the public, it was opened in February 1862. By the 1880s there were a number of shops on Glenferrie Road.

Glenferrie Road was signed as Metropolitan Route 19 between Kew and Malvern in 1965. Metropolitan Route 19 continues south, with a brief concurrency along Dandenong Road, via Hawthorn Road eventually to Black Rock.

The passing of the Road Management Act 2004 granted the responsibility of overall management and development of Victoria's major arterial roads to VicRoads: in 2004, VicRoads re-declared the road as Glenferrie Road (Arterial #5310), beginning at Cotham Road at Kew and ending at Dandenong Road in Caulfield North.

== Transport ==
Tram route 16 runs along the entire length of Glenferrie Road. The Malvern tram depot is also located on Glenferrie Road, serving routes 5, 6, 58 and 72. Three railway stations are each located on Glenferrie Road: Glenferrie, serving the Belgrave, Lilydale, and Alamein lines in Hawthorn; Kooyong, serving the Glen Waverley line in Kooyong; and Malvern, serving the Frankston line, in Malvern.

== Landmarks ==
The Kooyong Tennis Stadium, the original home of the Australian Open, is located on Glenferrie Road, as are Stonnington House, formerly the Toorak Campus of Deakin University (and Government House, Melbourne from 1901 to 1927) and the biggest campus of the Swinburne University of Technology. Malvern Town Hall, housing Stonnington City Council (seat of the local government area of the City of Stonnington), is located on the corner of High Street in Malvern.

== See also ==
- Road infrastructure in Melbourne
