= Will Alma =

Australian magician

Will Alma, OAM (born Oswald George William Bishop; 4 November 1904 – 6 May 1993) was an Australian stage magician, maker of conjuring apparatus and magic historian. He is perhaps best known for his curation and donation of the 'WG Alma Conjuring Collection' to State Library Victoria.

== Early years ==
Oswald George William Bishop was born in Malvern, Australia. His parents were Oswald Henry Bishop, a tinsmith by trade and a stage magician who performed under the stage name 'Alma, the Court Magician', and Rosetta Mary Long, a piano teacher. He was an only child. After his father abandoned the family and moved to the US, his mother forbade the young Bishop (later Alma) from considering magic as a career.

== Career ==
After acquiring a copy of Magic Made Easy by David Devant, Bishop studied magic in secret, against his mother's wishes. His first performance was at an amateur talent contest at the Burke Road Congregational Church in Malvern at the age of 15 – after which his mother accepted and supported his career as a stage magician.

In 1949, Bishop changed his name by deed poll to William George Alma. He enjoyed a successful career as a performer and a manufacturer of conjuring apparatus and props, with a particular highlight being touring Australia and New Zealand with Levante as Technical Adviser and Technician Levante's 'How's Tricks' show.

After having a heart attack, Alma retired from performing and turned his attention to curating the collection of magic memorabilia which would later become the WG Alma Conjuring Collection.

In 1991 he was awarded a Medal of the Order of Australia on the Queen's Birthday public holiday "for service as a magician and to the conservation of conjuring memorabilia." In the same year he received a Presidential Citation from the International Brotherhood of Magicians for his services to magic.

== WG Alma Conjuring Collection ==
The WG Alma Conjuring Collection, housed at State Library Victoria, is an extensive archive of magic-related material including but not limited to: props, posters, books, magazines, scale models of tricks and research files.

Originally a solo project, Alma began working in conjunction with the library to grow the collection in later life, acting as an honorary curator and adviser before bequeathing the full collection to the library upon his death in 1993.
