= Stonington mansion =

Former Australian Government House in Melbourne

Coordinates: 37.848934°S 145.03159°E

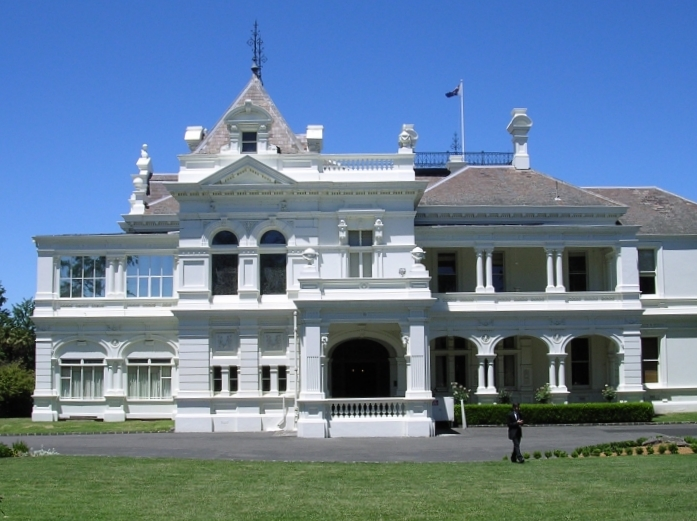
Stonington mansion

Stonington (formerly Stonnington) is a private residence and former Australian Government House located in the Melbourne suburb of Malvern, at 336 Glenferrie Road. The house was built for John Wagner, a partner in Cobb and Co coaches. Stonington gave its name to the City of Stonnington, a Melbourne municipality.

== Wagner house ==
John Wagner, a partner in Cobb and Co coaches, built the house in 1890. The house was designed in the Italianate Victorian style by architect Charles D'Ebro. The house was named for the birthplace of Wagner's wife, Mary, in Stonington, Connecticut, USA. Wagner and his family lived in the house until his death in 1901.

== Government House ==
At the Federation of Australia in 1901 Melbourne became the location of government, and Government House, Melbourne became the home of the Governor-General and Stonnington Mansion was leased by the Victorian Government as a home for the Governor of Victoria in 1901, before eventually being purchased by the state, along with all its contents, in 1928. The house was maintained as Victoria's Government House until 1931. During that time the house hosted many famous guests, including Dame Nellie Melba, the Duke and Duchess of York (later King George VI and Queen Elizabeth), the Prince of Wales (later King Edward VIII), Lord and Lady Baden-Powell, Lord Kitchener, Sir John Monash, Sir Keith Murdoch, and Ernest Shackleton.

Christopher Rous, who died in 1925 at age nine, is buried in the grounds. He died of leukaemia in the house when his father, the Earl of Stradbroke, was Governor of Victoria. His ghost is reputed to still haunt the house.

== School and Health service ==
In 1931 the state of Victoria leased the mansion to St Margaret's School, which occupied the site until 1938. In 1938 the state took back control and the Victoria Health Department used it as a hospital for children with polio; during and World War II the department of health allowed the Australian Red Cross to share the building in its work to help wounded soldiers convalesce.

In 1957 the Victoria Department of Education took over the property from the Department of Health and made the site the campus for the Toorak Teachers College; the Department of Health continued to run some health services out of parts of the mansion until 1958. In 1962 the college moved all classes out of the mansion and started using it only for administration and plans were made to build a new wing, which was completed in 1968. In 1973 the college was made part of the State Colleges of Victoria system, and in 1981 the college was merged into the newly formed Victoria College.

In 1991, as part of the Dawkins education reforms that were announced in 1988 by the Commonwealth government, Victoria College was made part of Deakin University.

== Private residence ==
By 2006 Deakin University put the mansion and campus up for sale. This was met with protest from local residents, who believed the property should be retained by a government body so it could remain a public space. In December 2006, the three-hectare property was sold for $33 million to a joint venture between Hamton Property Group and Industry Superannuation Property Trust.

In June 2007, businessman and former President of the Liberal Party in Victoria, Michael Kroger, announced that he and other Australian businessmen, a group dubbed the "Melbourne Lodgers", would examine properties in Melbourne for the Prime Minister of Australia to use as a residence while in that city. Kroger stated that Stonington was the most sought-after residence on that list.

In August 2007 the 1.3-hectare site, comprising the mansion, gatehouse and 3 acres (12,000 m^{2}), were conditionally sold to art dealer Rodney Menzies for about $18 million, as a private residence.

In June 2008 the remaining 1.7-hectare garden site was acquired for $45 million by Sydney-based developer and fund manager Ashington, who announced a $150 million project called Stonington Malvern, a 75-dwelling development in four precincts, comprising 31 terrace houses, 18 townhomes, 14 apartments and 12 maisonettes. In March 2009 the mansion's former stables, and until September 2007 Deakin University's Stonington Stables Museum of Art, were sold separately by Ashington for about $4 million.

In February 2018, Rod Menzies sold the mansion for $52 million to a Chinese buyer, eclipsing the state's previous $40 million record for a Toorak home, making it the most expensive house in the state.
