= Malvern Town Hall =

Local government seat in Victoria, Australia

Coordinates: 37°51′22″S 145°01′46″E

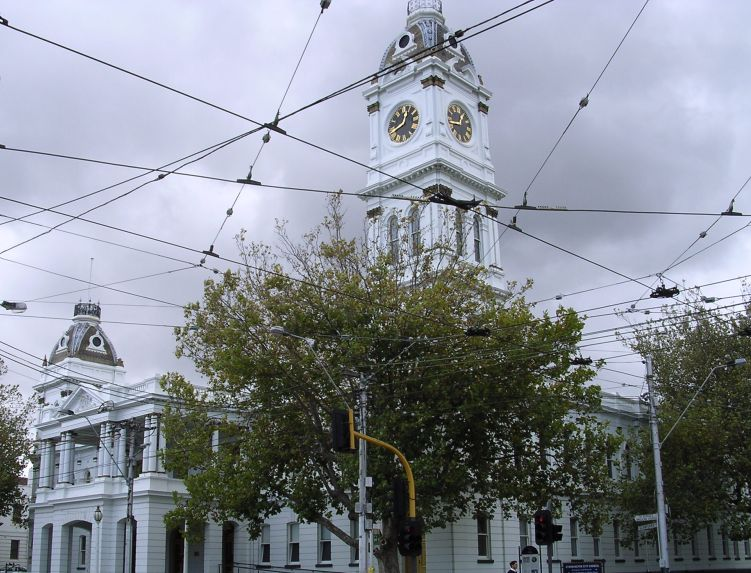
Malvern Town Hall, now offices of the City of Stonnington

Malvern Town Hall is the former town hall of the municipality of Malvern in the state of Victoria, Australia. It is the seat of the local government area of the City of Stonnington.

The Second Empire and Italianate style Victorian era building is located on the northeast corner of Glenferrie Road and High Street, in Malvern.

== History ==
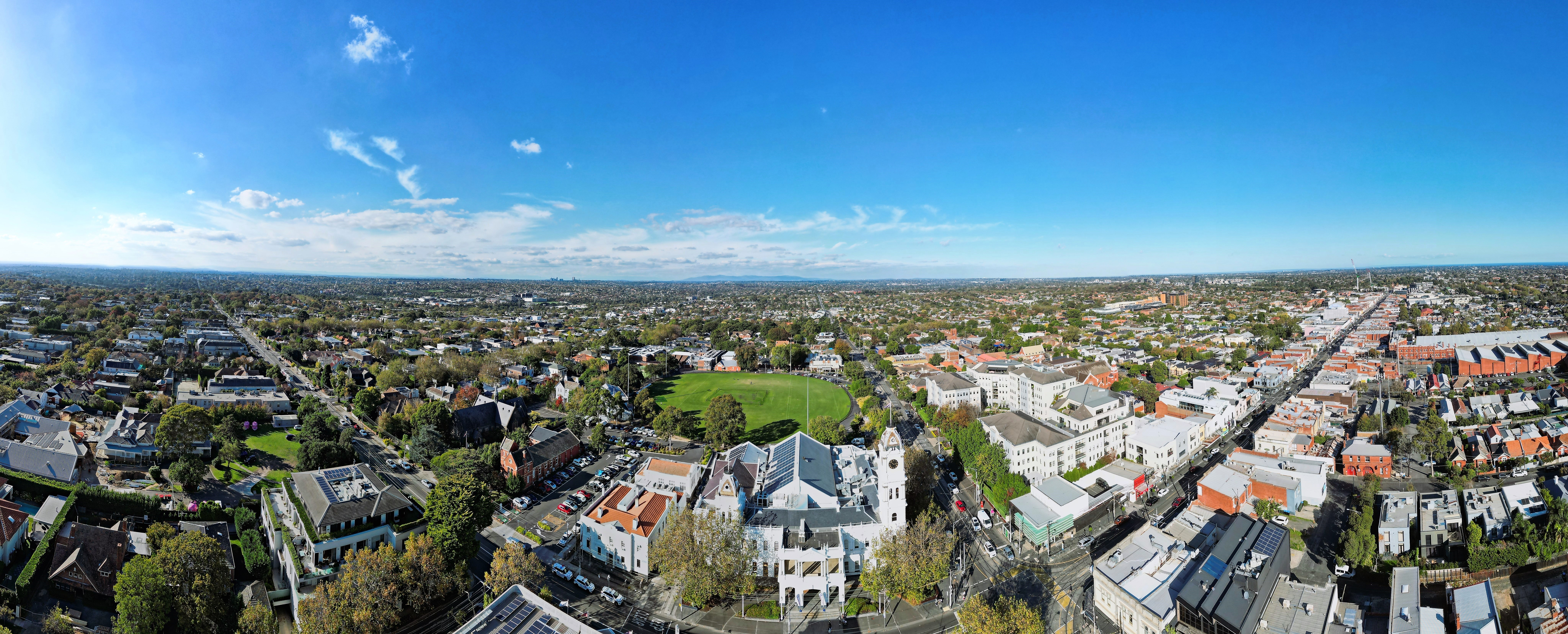
Aerial panorama of Malvern Town Hall intersected by Glenferrie Road and High Street. April 2023.

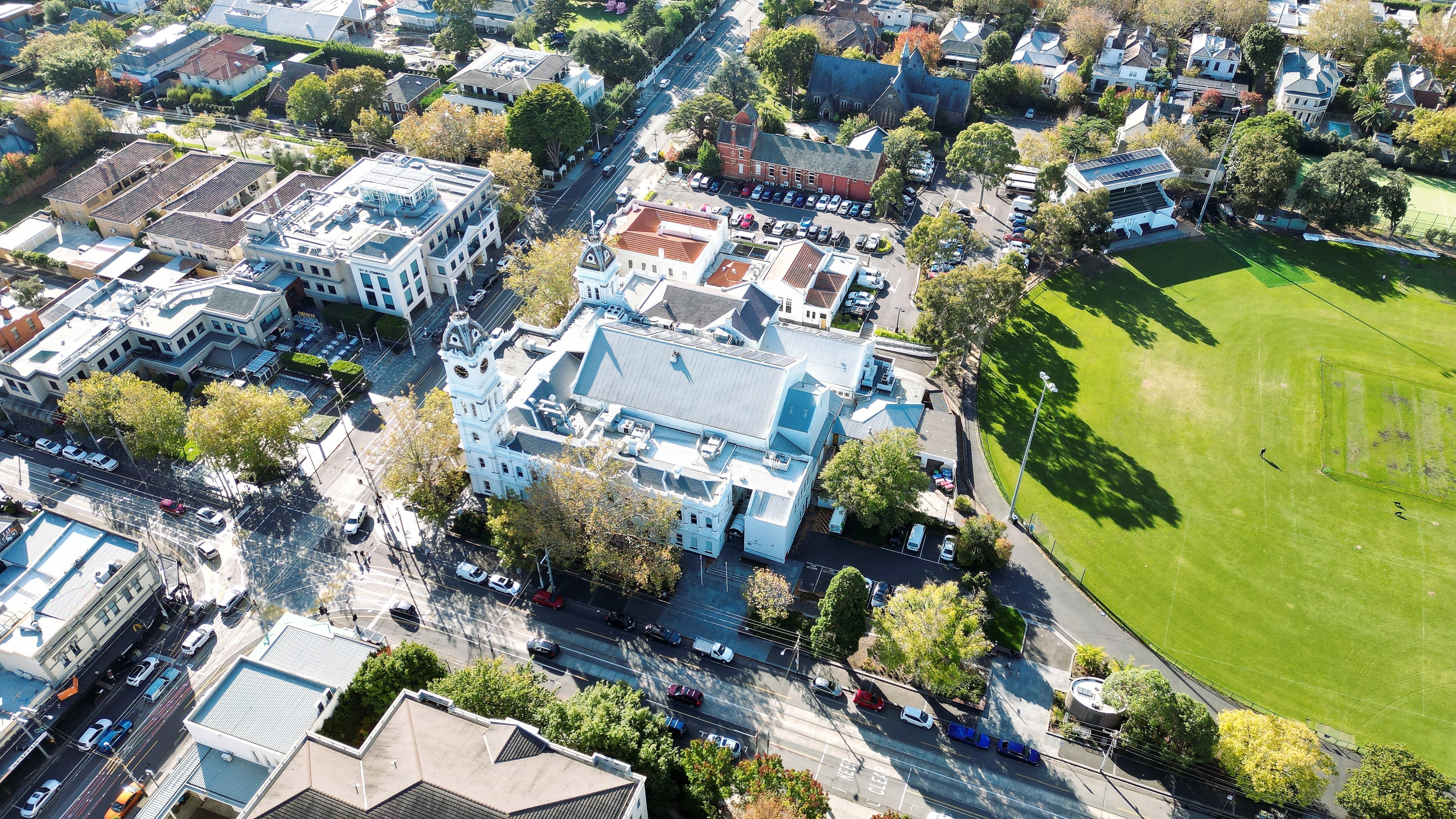
Aerial vista of Malvern Town Hall. April 2023.

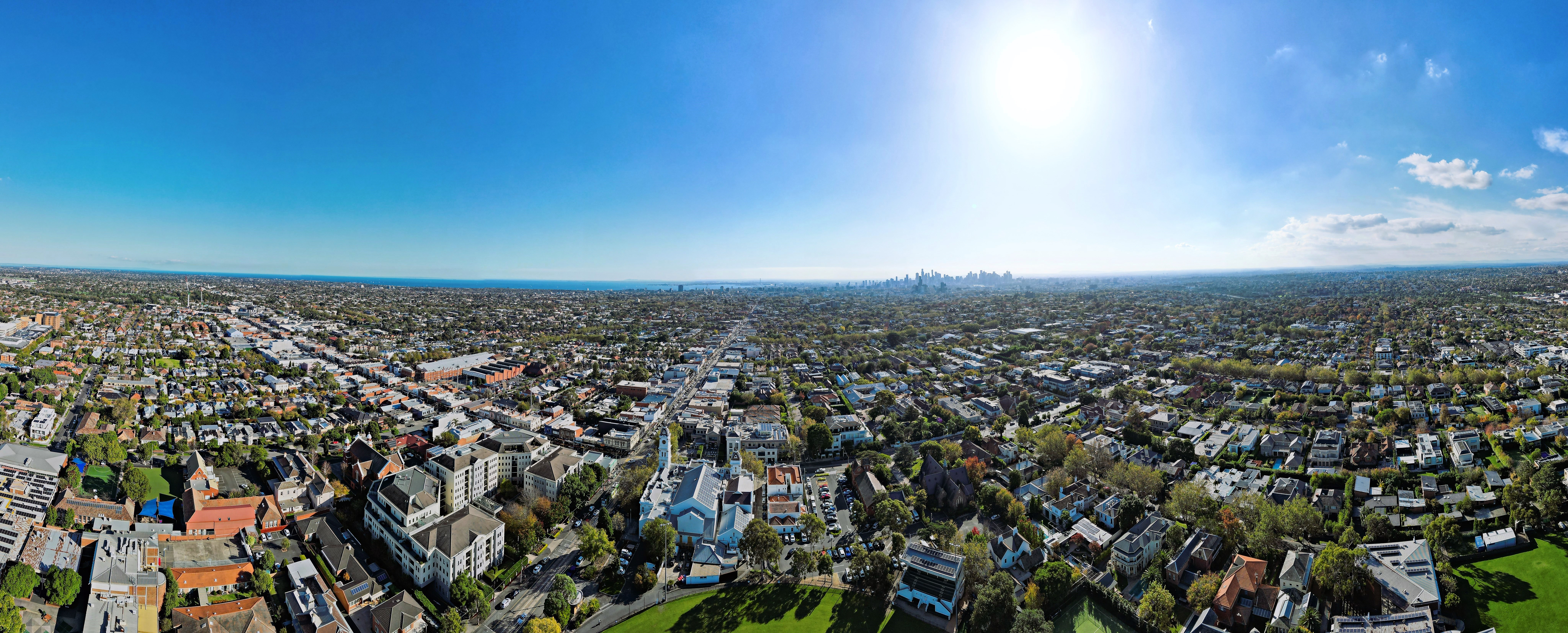
Aerial panorama of Malvern facing west towards the Melbourne skyline and Port Philip Bay. April 2023.

Planning for a shire hall in the Gardiner Road District commenced as early as 1867. In 1878 land at the corner of High Street and Glenferrie Road was reserved for a shire hall, court house and library. Two years later, the estimated cost of erecting a building comprising a shire hall, municipal, post and telegraph offices, library and reading room was £4,000. The council considered the shire could not afford to pay such a sum, and the members were against borrowing the money. In August, 1884, the proposal was again considered, and in November, the council decided to float a loan of £5,000 for the purpose of building a shire hall.

A Shire Hall Committee was formed and submitted a proposal to council which included a hall capable of holding 400 people, court house, rooms for a magistrate, clerk of petty sessions, shire secretary, a public reading room and library. Plans drawn up by Architects Wilson and Beswicke were accepted by council and the total cost of the new building was £8,651.

The foundation stone of the Malvern Shire Hall was laid by the Hon. Alfred Deakin, the Minister of Public Works, on 22 September 1885. The councillors and a representative gathering of residents watched the ceremony. A casket, containing copies of Melbourne newspapers of the day was deposited in a cavity beneath the foundation stone. Shire President, Councillor Robert G. Benson invited all those present to a luncheon in a marquee on the adjacent Malvern Cricket Ground.

A large number of residents and ratepayers of the Shire of Malvern assembled to witness the opening ceremony on Monday afternoon, 26 July 1886. The Shire President, Councillor Benson showed those present the new building and assembled the crowd in the Council Chamber for a toast to the Queen and the citizens of the Shire of Malvern. In the evening Councillor Benson presided over a civic banquet in the Main Hall. In August that year, the councillors presented Councillor Benson with a gold medal "commemorating the opening of the new public offices, and a small token of esteem in which he, the President, is held by the members of the Council."

Additions to the shire hall in 1890 included a second tower and an extended Glenferrie Road facade. A brass plaque at the base of the main tower commemorates the presentation of the clock in 1891 by Shire President, Councillor Alex McKinley.

In 1926, alterations to the design of architects Hudson and Wardrop, were carried out on the municipal wing, containing public offices, Council Chamber, and Mayoral rooms. The first council meeting was held in the new Council Chamber on 5 April 1927 and four months later the renovated Ballroom (with gallery), new Supper Room and Cocktail Lounge, front Portico and extended south wing were completed. A brass plaque at the head of the main stairs commemorates this renovation. The first official function held in the renovated City Hall was a mayoral ball given by the Mayor and Mayoress Councillor William Turnbull, and Mrs. Turnbull, on 28 July 1927. At a civic dinner, His Excellency the State Governor, Lord Somers, opened the hall and congratulated the citizens of Malvern on their possession of such a handsome civic building. In 1996 the City of Stonnington completed major renovations to the building.

== Architecture ==
Heritage Victoria describes the Malvern Town Hall as aesthetically and historically significant. It is an extraordinary and essentially intact example of a building of its type, having two towers. The building demonstrates a changing sequence of styles from the Late Victorian Boom period to interwar Adamesque. The use of marble and terrazzo in the foyers and the plaster Adamesque ornamentation in the hall is of note.

The Malvern Town Hall is a large and imposing Late Victorian Italianate style building with a symmetrical facade to Glenferrie Road and projecting two storey portico. The two tower roofs are in the French Second Empire style with fish scale slates, circular vents, elaborate leadwork and cast iron walks.

A terrazzo floor, marble walls and central marble staircase, feature in the foyer which leads to the upper cocktail lounge which has a similar elaborate, coffered ceiling. Also of interest in the foyer is the War Memorial designed by Paul Montford and the statue of Psyche and Cupid.

The Main Hall has a vaulted ceiling and pendant lighting from the period. Swags and urns decorate the curved sides of the vaults. The stage and rear gallery both feature cast plaster with City of Malvern crests. The Compton Pipe Theatre Organ was installed in 1992, having been acquired from the Piccadilly Cinema in Birmingham, England.

The Council Chamber with its tiered gallery and vaulted ceiling remains essentially intact. The Queensland Maple timber furnishings and panelled dado are original. An ornamental cast plaster ceiling is a feature of the Banquet Hall.

== Name change ==
After the amalgamation of the City of Malvern with the City of Prahran in 1994 to form the new City of Stonnington, the Town Hall was renamed the Stonnington City Centre and became the corporate headquarters of the new Stonnington City Council.

In 2015, the corporate headquarters of the Stonnington City Council was relocated to the new Stonnington City Centre, across the road at 311 Glenferrie Road, and the Malvern Town Hall reverted to its original name.

== Present functions ==
Malvern Town Hall can be hired for a variety of community and commercial events such as festivals, markets, music and fairs.

== See also ==
- List of town halls in Melbourne
