= City of Stonnington =

Local government area in Melbourne, Victoria, Australia

Coordinates: 37°51′22″S 145°01′46″E

- Local government area
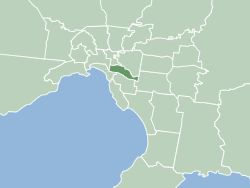

- Interactive map of City of Stonnington
- Country: Australia
- State: Victoria
- Region: Greater Melbourne
- Established: 1994
- Council seat: Malvern

Government
  - State electorates: Malvern; Prahran
  - Federal divisions: Chisholm; Kooyong; Macnamara; Melbourne

Area
  - Total: 25.7 km^{2} (9.9 sq mi)

Population
  - Total: 104,703 (2021)
  - Density: 4,074/km^{2} (10,552/sq mi)
- Website: City of Stonnington
LGAs around City of Stonnington
Yarra	Boroondara	Monash
Melbourne	City of Stonnington	Monash
Port Phillip	Glen Eira	Monash

The City of Stonnington is a local government area located within the metropolitan area of Melbourne, Australia. It comprises the inner south-eastern suburbs, between 3 and 13 km (2 and 8 mi), from the Melbourne CBD. The city covers an area of 25.7 km^{2} (9.9 sq mi). The City of Stonnington had a population of 116,207 in June 2018.

The name Stonnington comes from Stonington mansion, the Charles D'Ebro-designed mansion built in 1890 for a founding partner of Cobb & Co, John Wagner, who named the house after his wife's birthplace in Stonington, Connecticut, USA. The house is located in Glenferrie Road, Malvern.

The logo of the City of Stonnington features two interlocking celebratory ribbons representing the coming together of the two former cities of Malvern and Prahran.

The City of Stonnington is one of the richest local government areas in Victoria.

== History ==
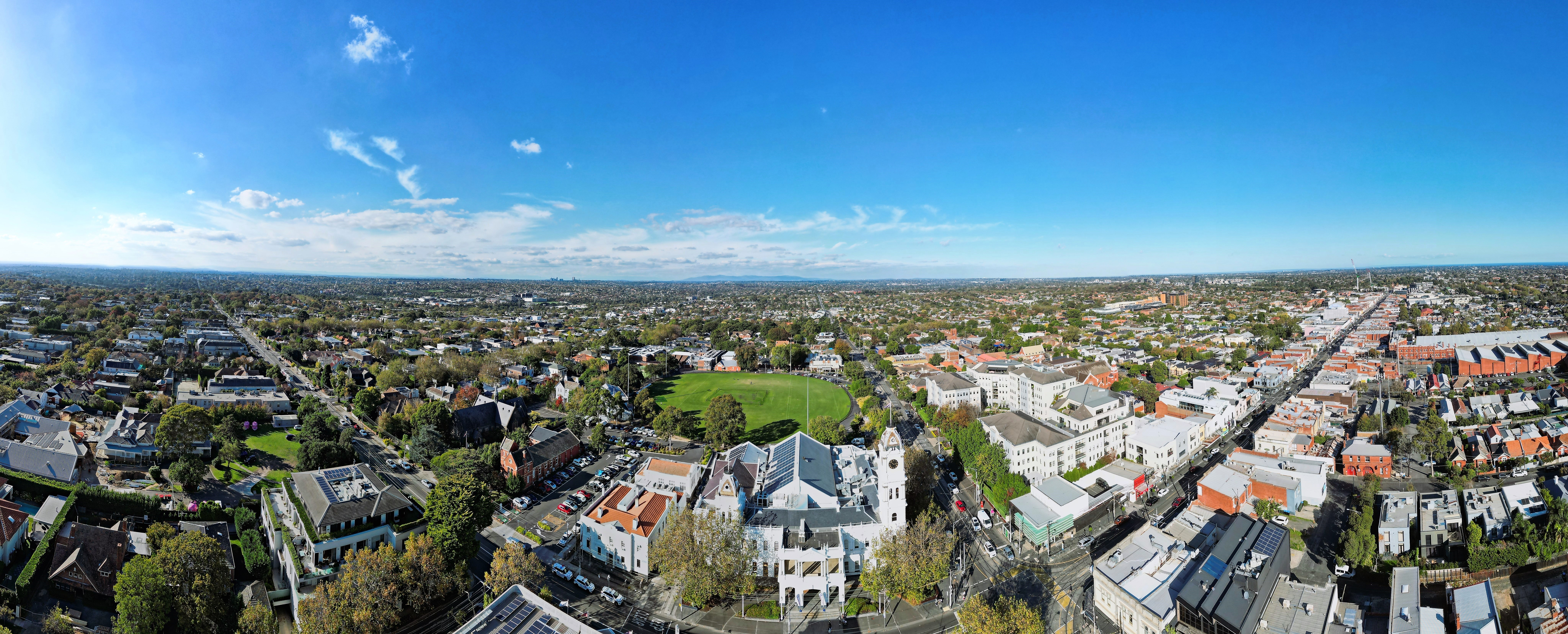
Aerial panorama of Malvern Town Hall intersected by Glenferrie Road and High Street. April 2023.

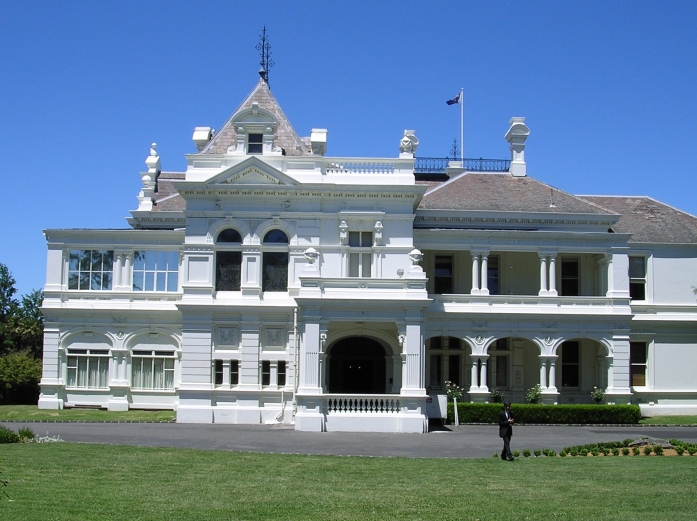
Stonington mansion after which the City of Stonnington was named

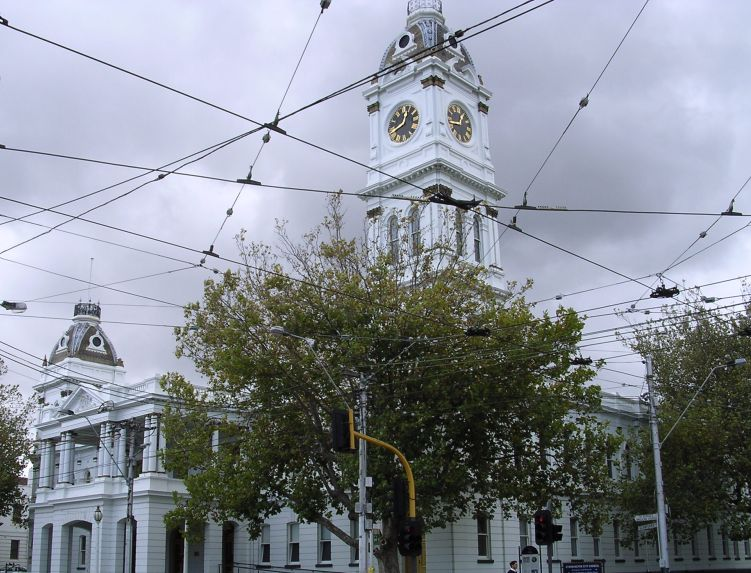
Malvern Town Hall

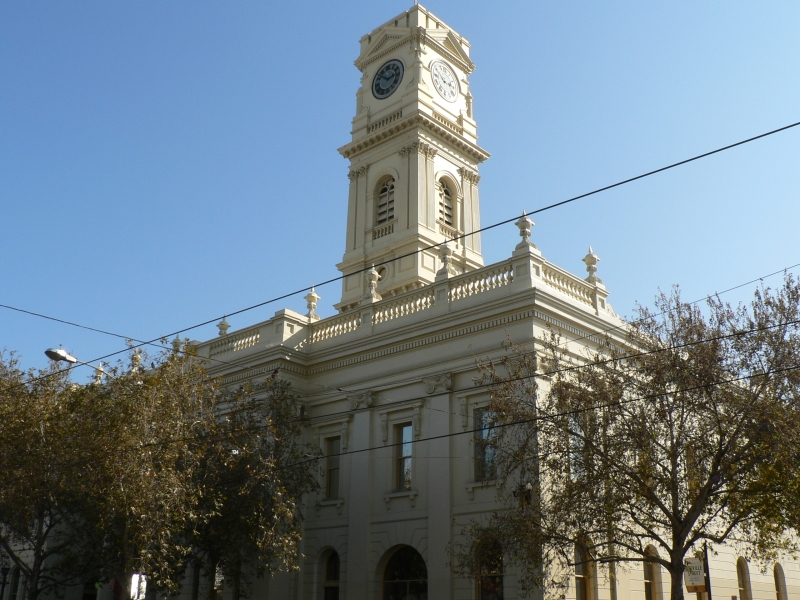
Prahran Town Hall now houses a library and council offices

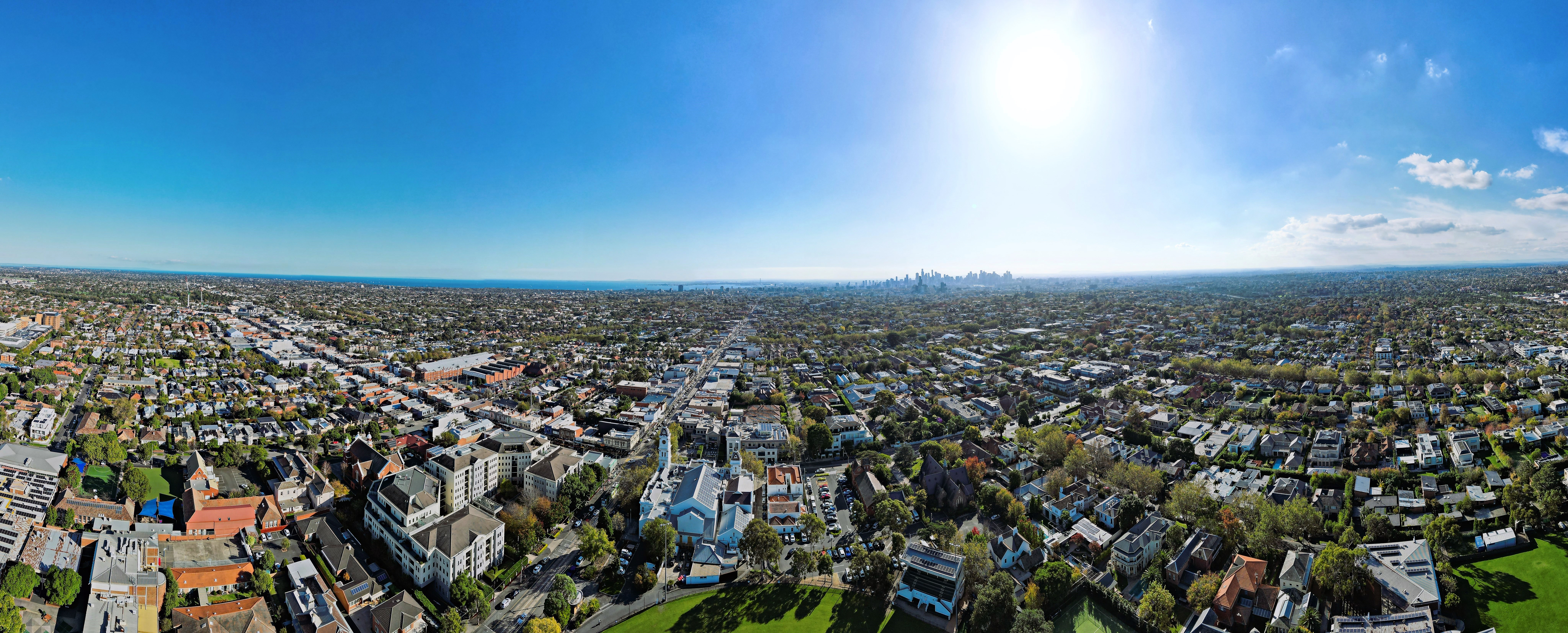
Aerial panorama of Malvern facing west towards the Melbourne skyline and Port Philip Bay. April 2023.

Prior to European settlement, the land of the City of Stonnington was occupied by the Wurundjeri, an Indigenous Australian Woiwurrung speaking people of the Kulin nation.

The establishment of European settlers in what was then the Port Phillip District of New South Wales in 1835, was soon followed by pastoralist John Gardiner, together with Joseph Hawdon and John Hepburn, driving cattle south from Yass to Kooyong Koot (later named Gardiner's) Creek, in the area now known as Malvern and establishing a homestead and grazing property.

The first sale of land by the Crown in the area took place on 10 June 1840 when land bounded by Kooyong Road, Gardiners Creek (Yarra River). Gardiners Creek Road (now Toorak Road) and Glenferrie Road was sold. The purchasers included Jane Hill (the widow of pastoralist David Hill), the Langhorne Bros. (the nephews of Captain William Lonsdale), Capt. John Browne and James Jackson.

The high ground between Gardiner's Creek Road (now Toorak Road) and the river returned the best prices and it was here that most of the grand mansions of the period were built. Much of the land south of Toorak Road was swampy. This area was subdivided into much smaller blocks, for workman's cottages and later to house gold-rush immigrants. The distinction between the two areas remains today in the suburbs of Toorak and South Yarra. Further auctions of land in the Prahran area took place in 1849 and 1850.

The early 1850s saw the return of many miners from the gold diggings to Prahran, resulting in increased development and the gazetting as a municipality in 1855. The population of Prahran at the time of the first council elections was about 8,000. Meanwhile, Government land sales within the area bounded by Kooyong Road, Gardiners Creek and Wattletree Road were held in 1854 and a small settlement grew around Malvern and Glenferrie Roads. The area known as Gardiner (later Malvern) was proclaimed a Roads Board District in 1856 and became a municipality in 1871, taking the name Malvern in 1878.

The 1880s and 1890s saw substantial residential and commercial development in the City of Prahran, such that by 1891 Prahran had a population of almost 40,000. The development of Malvern followed from 1900 onwards and by 1921 Malvern's population was almost 33,000.

The late 19th century saw substantial residential and commercial development such that by 1891 Prahran had a population of almost 40,000 and Malvern 11,000. Following the election of the Kennett government in the Spring of 1992, as part of a comprehensive reorganisation of local government in Victoria, the Cities of Malvern and Prahran were amalgamated to form the City of Stonnington.

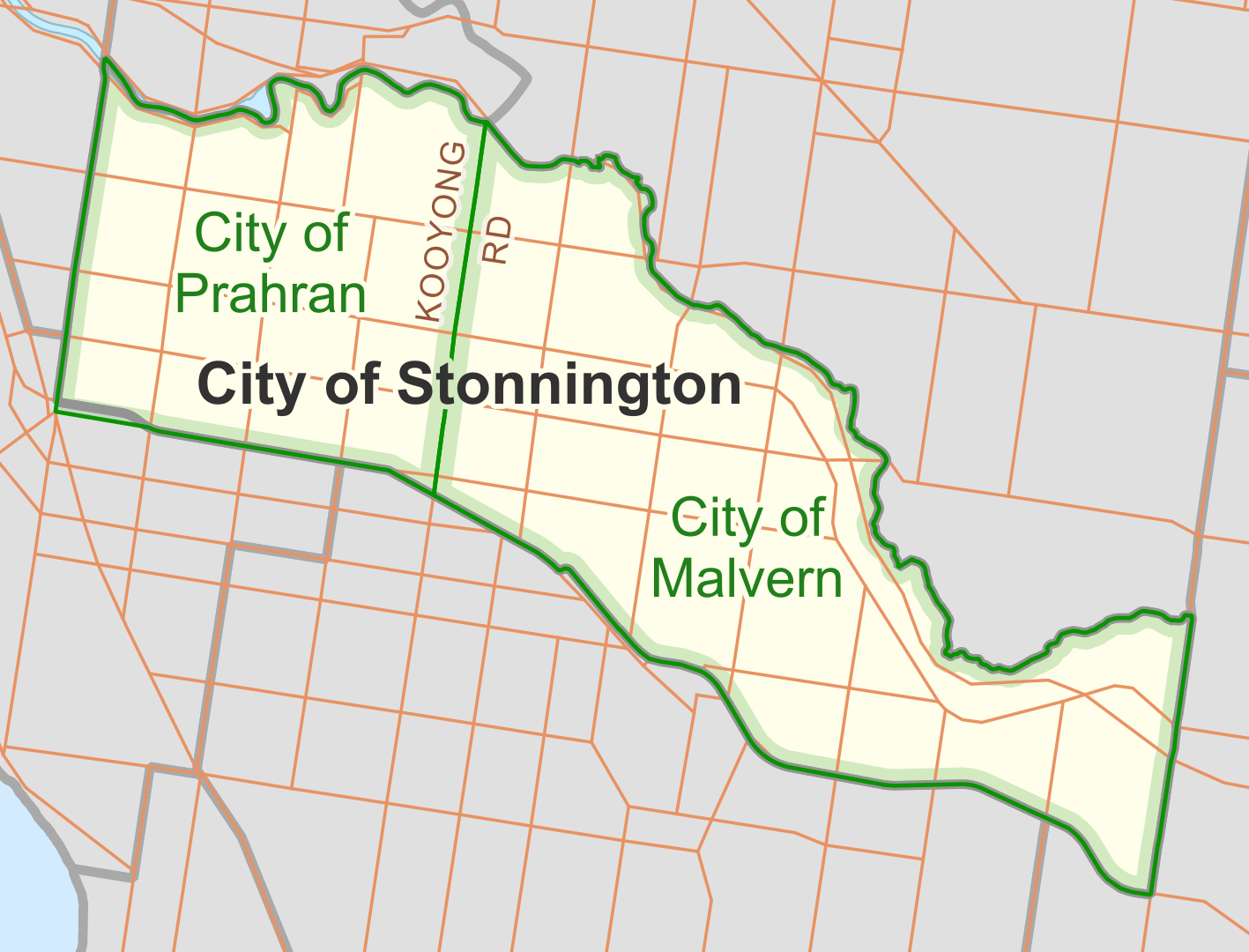
The City's predecessor LGAs (green) as they were in 1994

Following the amalgamation of the cities the Malvern Town Hall was renamed the Stonnington City Centre and it became the corporate headquarters of the new Stonnington City Council. In 2015, the new Stonnington City Centre, opposite at 311 Glenferrie Road, was opened and the Malvern Town Hall reverted to its original name.

== Geography ==
The western part of the city, around South Yarra, Prahran and Windsor, were originally part of the Yarra River flood plain and much of the area was covered by swamps, bogs, and creeks, formed from the run-off from the Malvern Hills to the east. The Albert Park Lake to the west is a remnant of the original flood plain.

The City of Stonnington is bounded by the Yarra River and Gardiners Creek to the north, Warrigal Road to the east, Dandenong Road and Queens Way to the south and Punt Road to the west. Stonnington has numerous tree-lined streets and 126 parks and gardens as well as 27 off-leash parks. Many public reserves occur along the Gardiners Creek valley. The city has some of Melbourne's major shopping precincts in Chapel Street, Glenferrie Road, High Street, Malvern Road and Toorak Road, as well as the Chadstone Shopping Centre. Local sporting venues include Malvern Valley Golf Club, Kooyong Lawn Tennis Club and Harold Holt Memorial Swimming Centre.

== Demographics ==
The following demographic information is from the 2011 Census of Population and Housing, Australian Bureau of Statistics.

- Population – Stonnington has a population of 93,145, of which 52% are female. There are 39,105 occupied dwellings in the city.
- Age – The age structure of the population of Stonnington is different from the Greater Melbourne average with a higher percentage of persons aged 25–34 (21.9%) and a lower percentage of children aged under 15 (13.1%).
- Country of birth – Stonnington has a multicultural population with 29% being born overseas. The top five countries of birth are England, India, China, New Zealand and Greece.
- Language spoken – In 27.6% of homes a language other than English is spoken. The top five languages are Greek, Mandarin, Cantonese, Italian, and Hindi.
- Religious affiliation – 20.8% of people stated their religion as Catholic, 27.2% as no religion, 14.9% as Anglican and 5.7% as Eastern Orthodox.
- Weekly income – The median household income is $1,722. Stonnington has a higher household income when compared to the Greater Melbourne median of $1,333.
- Occupation – 57.4% of the populations gave their occupation as Professional or Manager, compared to the Greater Melbourne average of 36.6%.
- Employment – The unemployment rate in Stonnington was 4.4% compared to 5.5% in Greater Melbourne (4.4%).
- Dwellings – Stonnington has a higher proportion of medium or high density dwellings (64%), compared to the Greater Melbourne average of 28%.
- Housing loan repayments – The median monthly housing loan repayment in Stonnington was $2,447, compared to the Greater Melbourne average of $1,800.
- Households renting - 43.4% are renting compared to 27% in Greater Melbourne.

== Council ==
2024 ward boundaries. Expand the map and click on a ward to see the ward name.

Party	Councillors
Independent	6
Independent Labor	2
Independent Liberal	1
Total	9

Ward	Party	Councillor	Notes
Como	Independent Labor	Meghan Hopper	
Greville	Independent	Melina Sehr	Mayor 2003–2004, 2010–2011, 2014–2015, 2024–2026; Deputy Mayor 2020–2023
Hedgeley Dene	Independent	Sally Davis	Mayor 2002–2003
Malvern Valley	Independent Labor	Jami Klisaris	Mayor 2016–2017, 2021–2023
Orrong	Independent	Samantha Choudhury	Deputy Mayor 2025–2026
South Yarra	Independent	Kate Hely	Mayor 2020–2021; Deputy Mayor 2026-2027
Toorak	Independent Liberal	Tom Humphries	Deputy Mayor 2024–2025
Tooronga	Independent	Jamie Bell	
Wattletree	Independent	Steve Stefanopoulos	Mayor 2017–2020, 2026-2027

=== Mayors and councillors ===
From 1996 until 2004, the mayor was elected annually for the following 12 months in March. From 2004 the election took place in November or December. There was a truncated transitional term of office from March to November 2004.

== Townships and localities ==
The 2021 census, the city had a population of 104,703 up from 103,832 in the 2016 census

Population
Locality	2016	2021
Armadale	9,054	9,368
Glen Iris^	25,268	26,131
Kooyong	817	842
Malvern	10,066	9,929
Malvern East	21,707	22,296
Prahran	12,982	12,203
South Yarra^	25,147	25,028
Toorak	12,909	12,817
Windsor^	7,281	7,273

^ - Territory divided with another LGA

== Education ==
Australia has a system of public (state government) and private (independent) schools. Most public schools are co-educational. Most private schools are administered by their own boards and receive a government subsidy besides having their own fee structure.

=== Secondary education ===
Schooling is compulsory for students until the age of fifteen, although many students continue on to complete Year 12. The following are secondary colleges (high schools) in the City of Stonnington:

- De La Salle College, Malvern
- St Kevin's College, Toorak
- The King David School, Armadale
- Korowa Anglican Girls' School, Glen Iris
- Lauriston Girls' School, Armadale
- Loreto Mandeville Hall, Toorak
- Sacré Cœur School, Glen Iris
- St Catherine's School, Toorak
- Melbourne High School, South Yarra
- Prahran High School, Windsor

Additionally, Kildara College, Malvern operated from 1917 to 1993 and Presentation College, Windsor operated from 1873 to 2020.

=== Tertiary education ===
- The Prahran Mechanics' Institute was founded in 1854. It grew to have a focus on the arts, and spawned the Prahran Technical Art School in 1909 (later being renamed the Prahran Technical School). In 1973, this body became the Prahran College of Advanced Education. The national higher education reforms of 1992 saw this body somewhat dismembered, with its campus becoming part of Swinburne University of Technology (and some of its courses and other aspects going to other organisations). The campus was then transferred to Melbourne Polytechnic in 2013.
- Brigidine Teachers' College was located in High St, Malvern at the Kildara school and convent. It moved and became part of the new Christ College in Chadstone in 1966. (The book "Reflections over time: collected stories from a group of women who trained as teachers in Catholic Education in 1960" was published by the Brigidine archive in 2005, and features the college.)
- Mercer House (Associated Teachers' Training College) was located at 11 Mercer Rd, Armadale, a short walk from Lauriston. It was established here in 1946, being a continuation of an earlier college in the city founded in 1921. By 1966, it trained both general primary and lower secondary teachers, as well as art, domestic science and special science teachers. The school aimed to supply teachers to Independent schools. It closed and merged into Toorak Teachers' College in 1975.
- Larnook Domestic Arts Teachers' College at the Larnook mansion, Armadale, was founded in 1950. It later became Larnook Teachers' College, but retained the domestic arts specialisation. It became the Armadale campus of the State College of Victoria at Rusden in 1973. This became part of Victoria College in 1981, forming the Armadale site of its Rusden campus. This closed in 1984. The property then became The King David School.
- Toorak Teachers' College was established by the state government in Malvern in 1951. It moved to the Stonington mansion in Malvern in 1957. This later became the State College of Victoria at Toorak, which became part of Victoria College in 1981. This then became part of Deakin University in 1991. Deakin chose to close the campus in 2006.
- Christ College Teachers' College was established in 1966, from the merger of Brigidine Teachers' College in Malvern and Presentation Teachers' College in Elsternwick. It was temporarily located in Malvern, before moving to a purpose built building in Chadstone in 1968. The college became the Christ Campus of the Australian Catholic University, and its location was later redefined as East Malvern. This campus closed in the year 2000, when its operations merged with those in Ascot Vale, and moved to Fitzroy. The site became part of the Chadstone Shopping Centre car park.

== Public transport ==
Stonnington is extremely well serviced by Melbourne's public transport system. Three suburban railway lines and eight tram services pass through the City of Stonnington, as well as a number of bus services, including 12 services to Chadstone Shopping Centre.

=== Railways ===
The Frankston railway line provides a regular service to South Yarra, Hawksburn, Toorak, Armadale and Malvern stations. The Sandringham railway line services South Yarra, Prahran and Windsor stations and the Glen Waverley line runs along the northern boundary of Stonnington to Heyington, Kooyong, Tooronga, Gardiner, Glen Iris, Darling, East Malvern and Holmesglen stations.

=== Trams ===
All major east–west roads in Stonnington have tram services. Route 3 runs along Balaclava Road and Waverly Road to East Malvern and tram route 5 services Dandenong Road and Wattletree Road and ends at Burke Road in Malvern. Route 6 runs along High Street and terminates at Malvern Road in Glen Iris, while route 72 services Commercial Road, Malvern Road and Burke Road and route 58 travels along Toorak Road and ends at Glenferrie Road in Toorak. Route 78 runs north–south along Chapel Street and Route 16 along Glenferrie Road.

== Media ==
Stonnington has a commercial news website, the Stonnington Leader, which is operated as part of the Herald Sun. When in free newspaper form, the publication had a circulation of about 50,000.

Stonnington News is the City of Stonnington's bi-monthly community newsletter that is delivered to all residents. It features a range of information to help keep residents informed of the latest Council news and views, as well as issues affecting the city. It was previously known as "InStonnington". In 2014 the publication became available online.

88.3 Southern FM is a local community radio station that includes Stonnington in its licence area.

The city maintains a list of newspapers that were previously based in the area.

Stonnington is also covered by the media of Greater Melbourne.

== See also ==
- List of Melbourne suburbs
- Malvern Town Hall
- List of mayors of Malvern
- List of mayors of Prahran
