= Malvern, Victoria =

Malvern
- Suburb
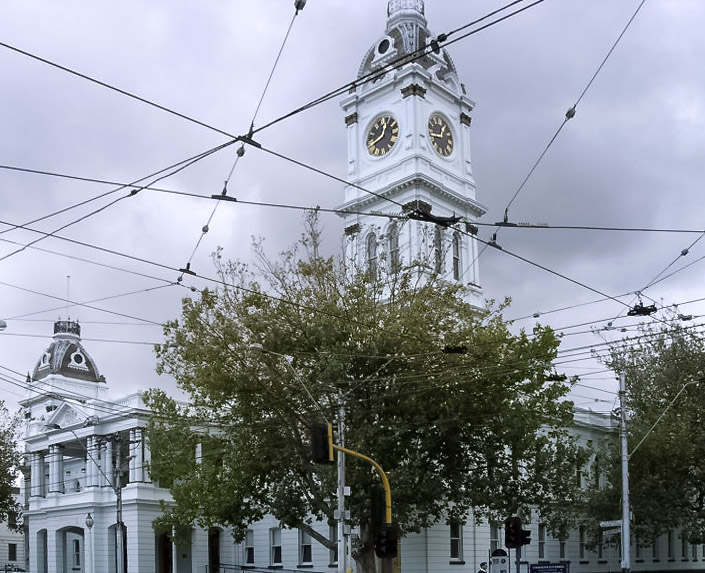
- Malvern Town Hall

- Interactive map of Malvern
- Coordinates: 37.857°S 145.036°E
- Country: Australia
- State: Victoria
- City: Melbourne
- LGA: City of Stonnington
- Location: 8 km (5.0 mi) from Melbourne
- Established: 1835

Government
  - State electorate: Malvern
  - Federal division: Kooyong

Area
  - Total: 2.9 km^{2} (1.1 sq mi)
- Elevation: 59 m (194 ft)

Population
  - Total: 9,929 (2021 census)
  - Density: 3,420/km^{2} (8,870/sq mi)
- Postcode: 3144
Suburbs around Malvern
| Toorak | Kooyong | Hawthorn East |
| Armadale | Malvern | Glen Iris |
| Caulfield North | Caulfield East | Malvern East |

Malvern (/ˈmɒlvərn/) is an inner suburb of Melbourne, Victoria, Australia, eight kilometres south-east of the Melbourne central business district, located within the City of Stonnington local government area. Malvern recorded a population of 9,929 at the 2021 census.

== History ==
The first people to live in the Malvern area were the Kulin people. The Yarra River and Gardiners Creek approximates the boundary of two Kulin groups, with the Boonwurrung to the south and the Wurundjeri to the north. According to Alfred Howitt, the rising area in Malvern from the junction of Wattletree Road and Dandenong Road was known as Koornang by the Kulin people, which meant 'rising ground'. The name was used for Koornang Road, which runs south of Malvern, through Carnegie.

The area of Malvern was first settled by Europeans in 1835. John Gardiner was one of the first Europeans to make his home in the general area. A small hamlet known as "Gardiners Creek" (1851 Melbourne Postal Directory) was established, but it diminished with the gold rush. The nearby creek was also named Gardiners Creek. Gardiners Creek Road (now Toorak Road) ran from South Yarra, east to the junction of Gardiners Creek and onto the Gardiner Homestead, which is now the site of Scotch College in Hawthorn. According to Howitt's notes, the place where Gardiner made his home was called Koyūng-bort in the Woiwurrung language.

In the 1860s the Gardiners Creek Roads Board was the forerunner of the Gardiners Creek Shire that then became Malvern Council.

Malvern Post Office opened on 1 January 1860 on Glenferrie Road, near Malvern Road. In 1892 this was renamed Malvern North when a new Malvern office on Glenferrie Road, near Wattletree Road, replaced the Malvern railway station office.

The then shire hall (later town hall) was built in 1886, on the corner of Glenferrie Road and High Street and later extended.

Prahran & Malvern Tramways Trust ran its first car out of Malvern depot on 30 May 1910.

Malvern is the original home of Malvern Star, once Australia's largest and most well-known bicycle manufacturer. Another business that began in Malvern was Crittendens chain of grocery stores and liquor outlets.

== Attractions ==
The main shopping attraction is Malvern Central, home to David Jones, Woolworths and BWS as well as forty other stores, mostly fashion stores like Cotton On Kids. Glenferrie Road is also Malvern's main shopping attraction, which has shops as well as a wide variety of restaurants and boutiques.

There are several Victorian parks and gardens in Malvern, including Malvern Gardens, in Spring Road. This park has a beautiful fountain which was built on the site of a natural spring. The water used to flow naturally, but as the land was developed, the water feeding the spring was interrupted, and the fountain is now run by electricity.

The Malvern Town Hall, in the Second Empire style, is where the Stonnington City Council meets and is opposite the corporate headquarters known as the Stonnington City Centre, which is also home to the Malvern Police Station and the Stonnington Council.

Significant heritage buildings listed on the Victorian Heritage Register include Stonington mansion (1890), Malvern tram depot, the former ES&A Bank (on the corner of Glenferrie Road and High Street) and Malvern railway station.

Other significant buildings include St Joseph's Parish Church (Roman Catholic) and De La Salle College tower building. There is also an Anglican parish church dedicated to St George and the Malvern Presbyterian Church.

The Malvern Police Station is located at 288 Glenferrie Road opposite the new Stonnington council building and next to the town hall. Malvern Police Station was the first Station in the state to receive the new Ford Ranger Divisional Van. Malvern Police Station is also home to Protective Service Officers with the Transit Division.

== Transport ==
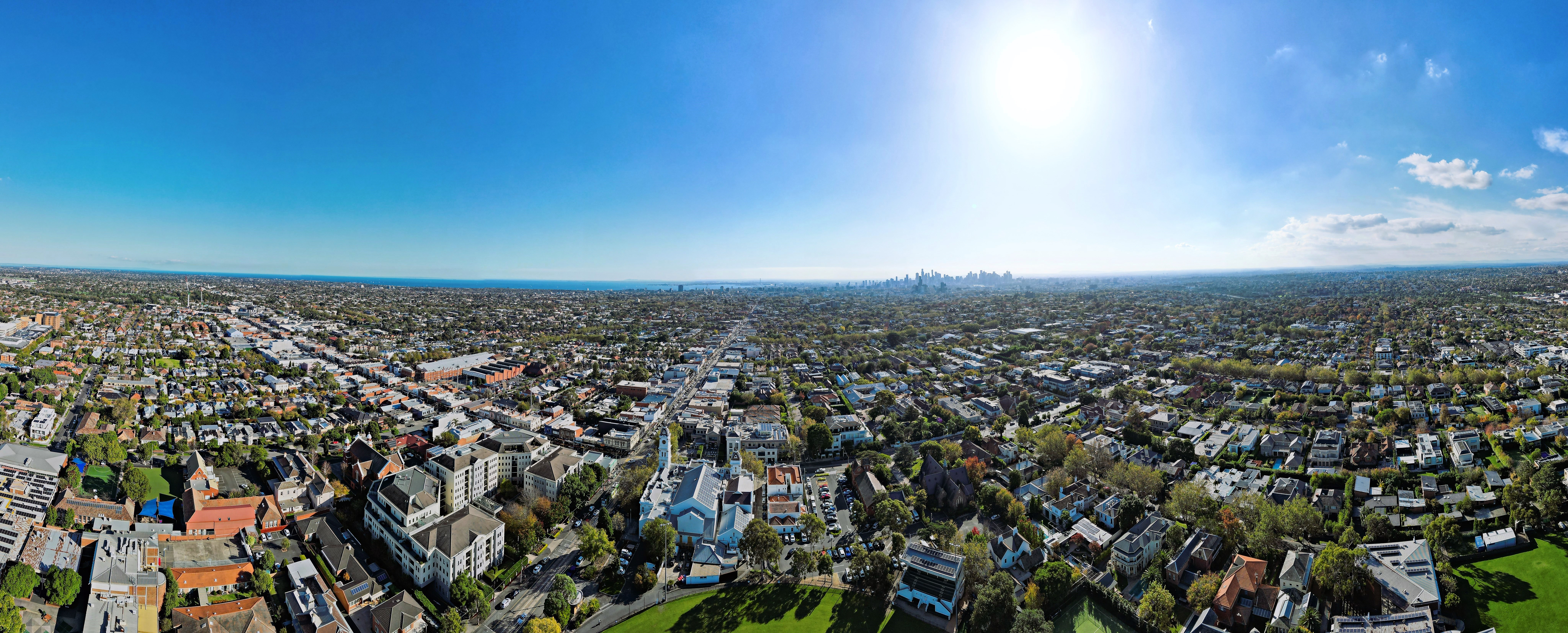
Aerial panorama of Malvern facing west towards the Melbourne skyline and Port Philip Bay in April 2023

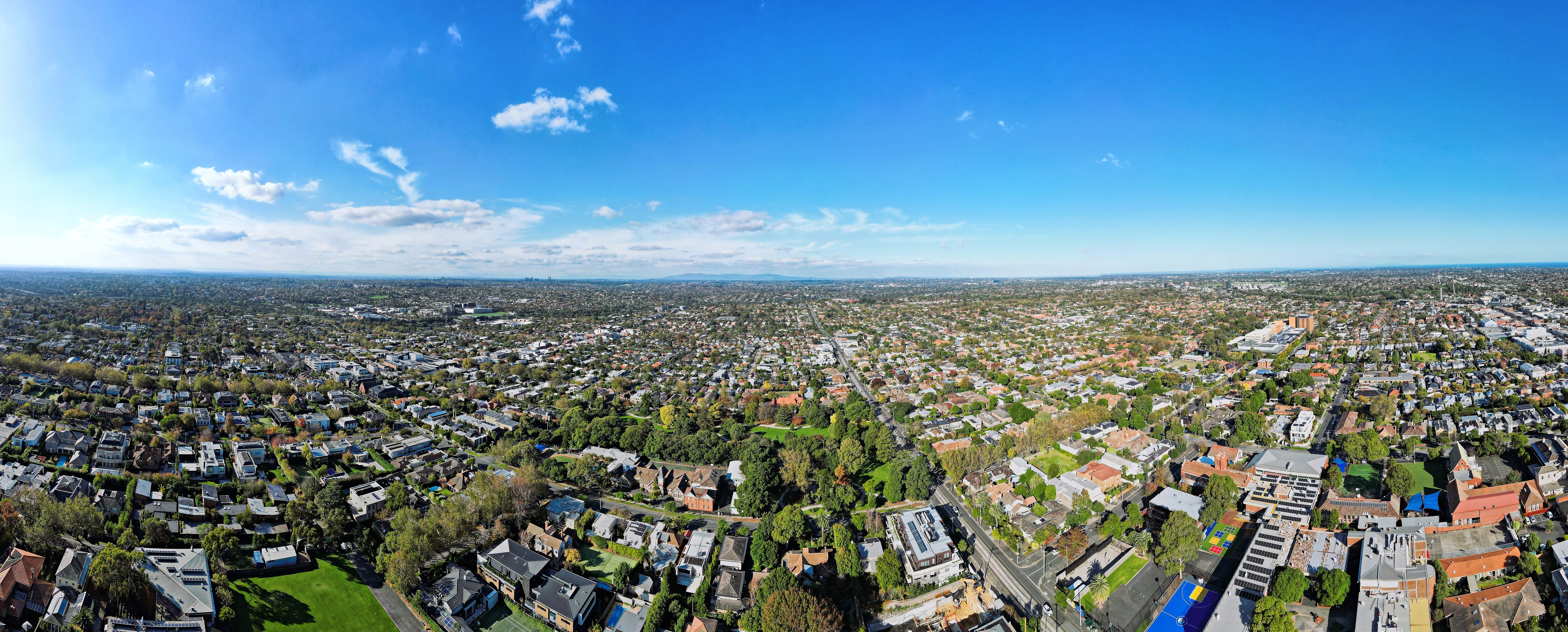
Aerial panorama of Malvern facing east to the Dandenong Ranges in April 2023

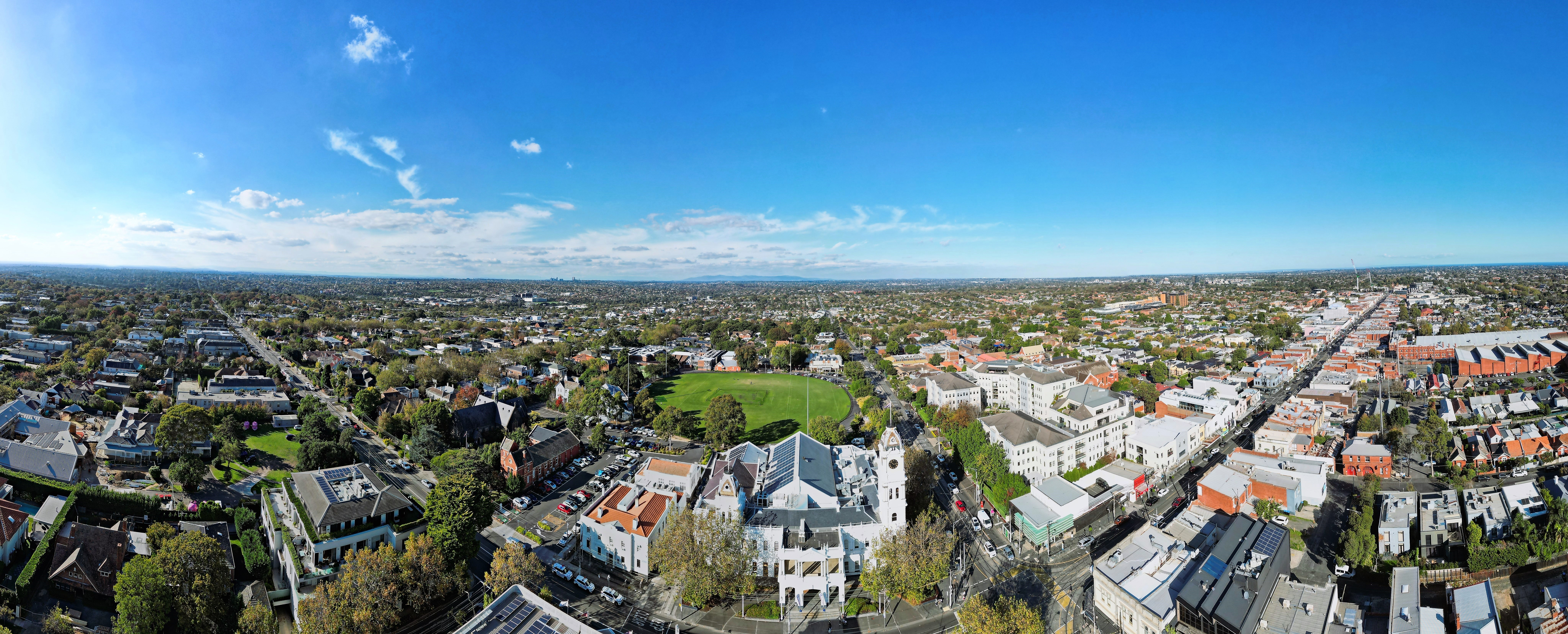
Aerial panorama of Malvern Town Hall intersected by Glenferrie Road and High Street in April 2023

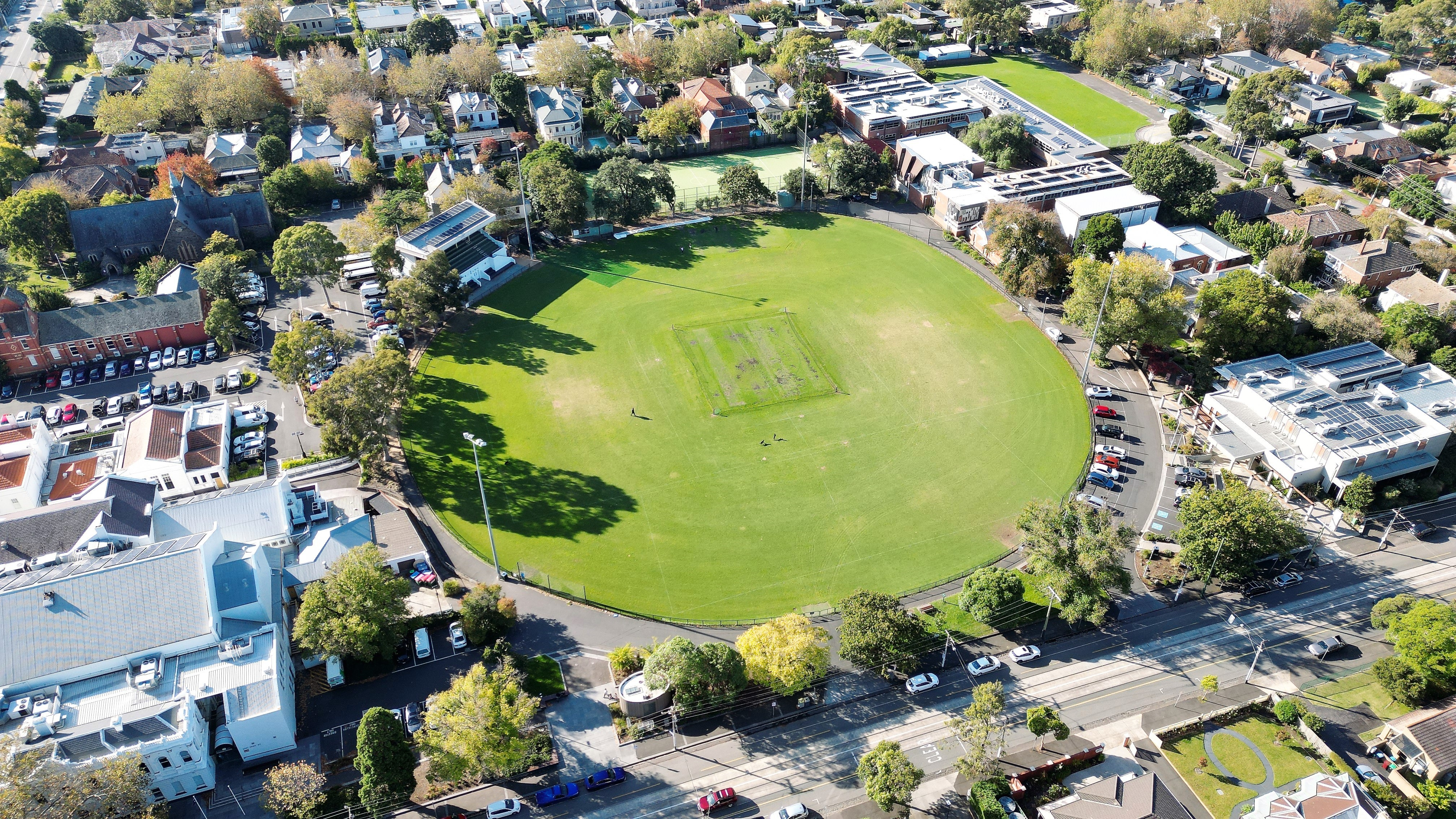
Aerial vista of the Malvern Cricket Ground in April 2023

The Malvern tram depot, located on Glenferrie Road (off Coldbo Road, Armadale), provides trams for the various routes which service Malvern.

Malvern railway station is a busy station on the Gippsland railway line. It is located on Station Street, Malvern (off Glenferrie Road). In addition, Tooronga station also services the northern section of the suburb, on the Glen Waverley line.

There are also various bus stops across Malvern and a train replacement stop outside Malvern station (Dandenong Road).

== Schools ==
- De La Salle College, Malvern, 1312–1326 High Street, with a second campus at 9 Northbrook Avenue, Malvern
- Malvern Primary School, Tooronga Road
- St Joseph's Primary School Malvern, 49 Stanhope Street
- Malvern Central School, Spring Road (Year 3–6) And Park Street (Prep – Year 2)

== Notable citizens ==
- Wes Agar – cricketer
- Will Alma (born Oswald George William Bishop) – stage magician
- Norman Banks – radio broadcaster
- Rupert Betheras – former AFL Collingwood footballer, grew up in East Malvern and attended Lloyd Street Central School and De La Salle College, Malvern.
- Andrew Bolt – political commentator
- Andrea Bresciani – Italian-born cartoonist and animator lived in Malvern in his later years and died there in 2006.
- Walter Crawford – first-class cricketer and British colonial official
- Katya Crema – skier cross and Olympian
- John Mark Davies – president of the Victorian Legislative Council from 1910 to 1919 and original owner of Malvern House (Valentines).
- Jason Donovan – actor and singer
- Robert Doyle – 103rd Lord Mayor of Melbourne, former Member for Malvern and former Leader of the Opposition in the Victorian Legislative Assembly.
- Jack Dyer – captain of Richmond Football Club, attended De La Salle College, Malvern.
- Colin Egar – former Test cricket umpire, born in Malvern in 1928.
- Tom Hafey – Australian rules (VFL) player and coach, Hafey attended Lloyd Street Central School (now Lloyd Street Primary) in East Malvern.
- Harold Holt – 17th Prime Minister of Australia from 1966 to 1967 and the namesake of the Harold Holt Memorial Swimming Centre, a swimming pool complex in neighbouring Glen Iris.
- Mack Horton – Australian Swimming Champion. 2016 Rio Olympics 400m Gold Medalist, 2018 Gold Coast Commonwealth Games 400m Gold Medalist, 2017 Recipient of The Order of Australia Medal.
- Brian Howe – 8th Deputy Prime Minister of Australia from 1991 to 1995.
- Gertrude Johnson – soprano and founder of the National Theatre, died in Malvern in 1973.
- Lowe Kong Meng – Chinese Australian businessman and merchant during the gold rush era
- John Landy – former track and field athlete and the 26th Governor of Victoria. Attended school at Malvern Memorial Grammar School, and trained for his 1957 four-minute mile around Central Park, Malvern.
- Stephanie McIntosh – actor and singer
- Ian McLaren - politician, businessman and historian
- Sir Robert Menzies – former Prime Minister of Australia, lived in Haverbrack Avenue, Malvern and has been commemorated in the naming of the Robert Menzies Reserve, bounded by Elizabeth Street, Henderson Avenue and Toorak Road in Malvern.
- Hubert Opperman – cyclist and politician, who was once employed by Malvern Star Cycles, a tiny cycle shop in Malvern.
- Will Pucovski – Australian cricketer
- Lydia Schiavello – cast member of reality television series The Real Housewives of Melbourne.
- Bruce Small – businessman and former owner of bicycle manufacturer Malvern Star
- Jesse Spencer – actor (Neighbours, House), attended Malvern Central School in the 1980s.
- Angela Thirkell – English novelist, lived at 4 Grace St. Malvern from 1919 to 1929.
- Lindsay Thompson – 40th Premier of Victoria from 1981 to 1982 and former Member for Malvern.

== Gallery ==
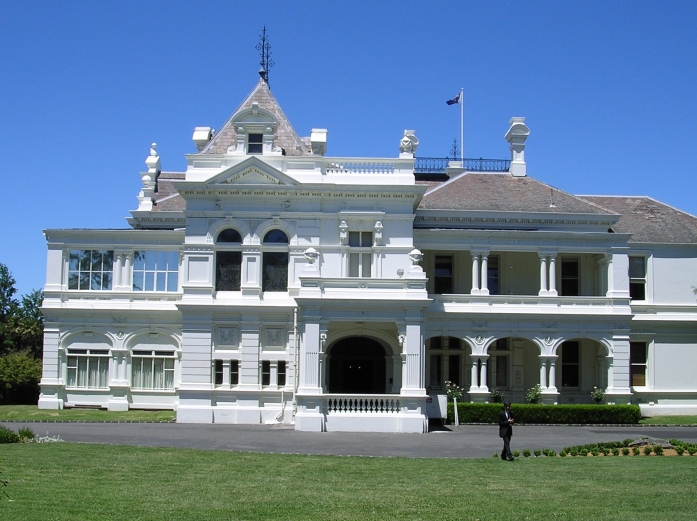
Stonington mansion after which the City of Stonnington was named.

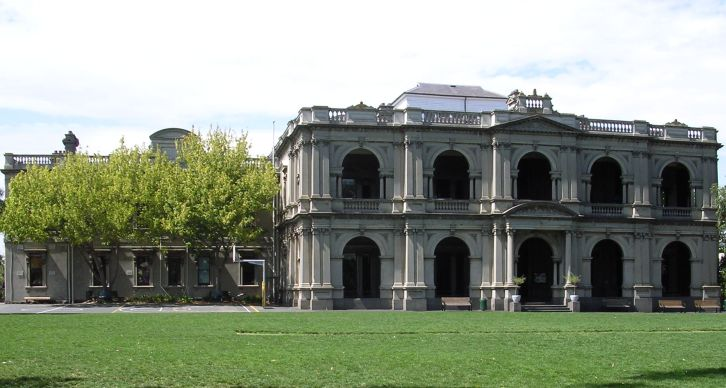
The Valentine's Mansion (now Caulfield Grammar School - Malvern Campus).

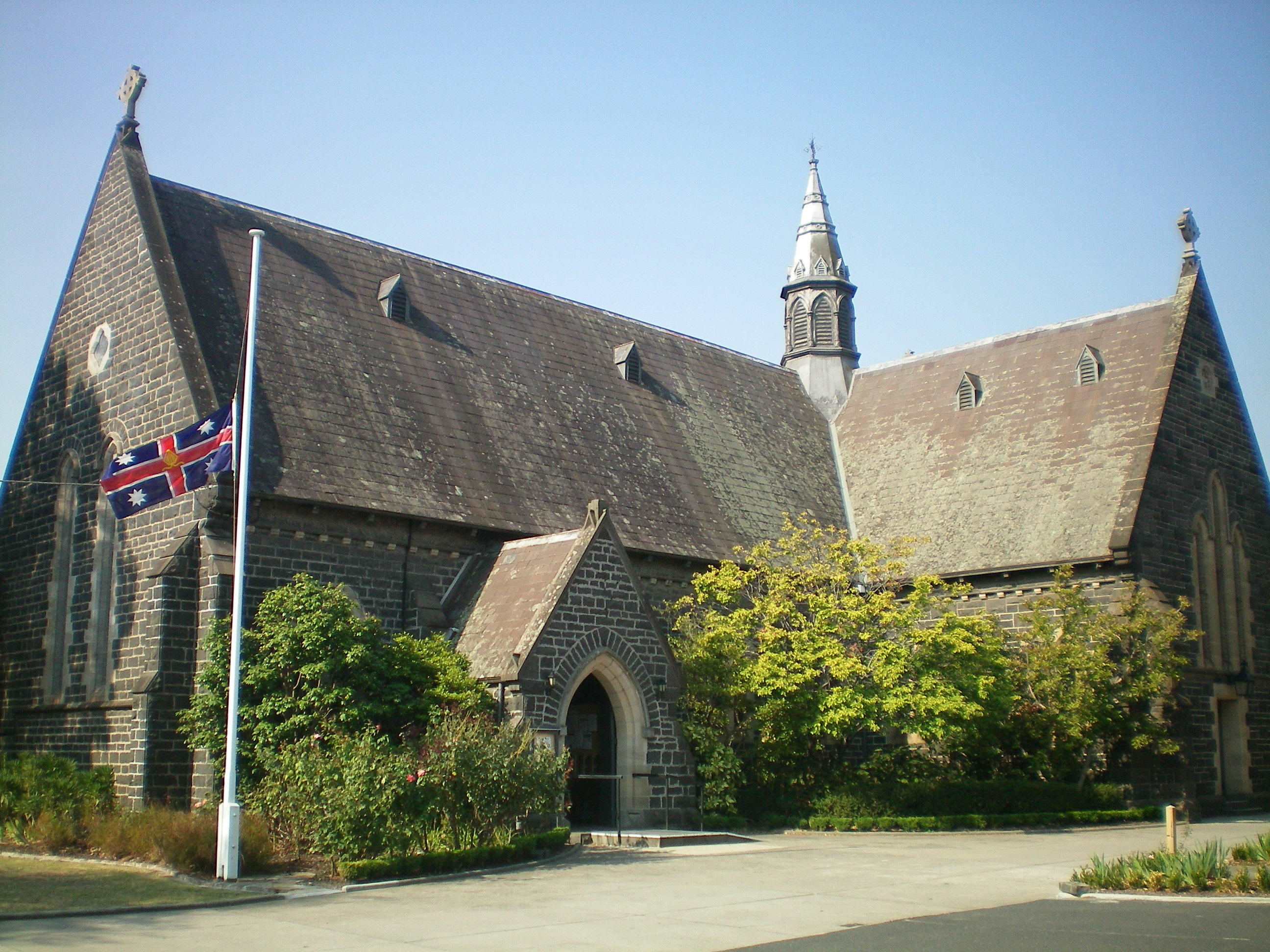
St George's Anglican Parish Church

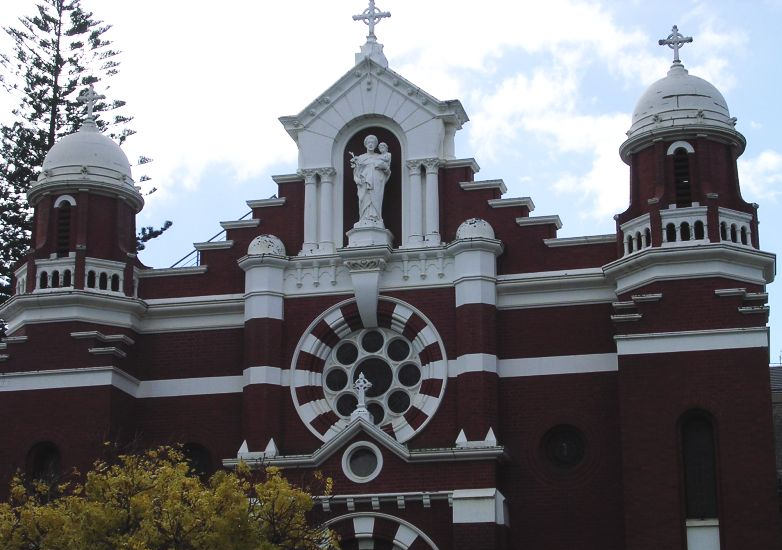
St Joseph's RC Parish Church

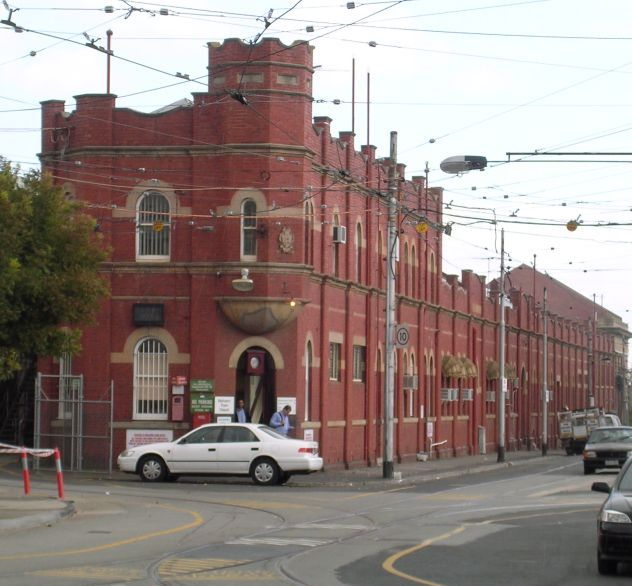
Malvern tram depot

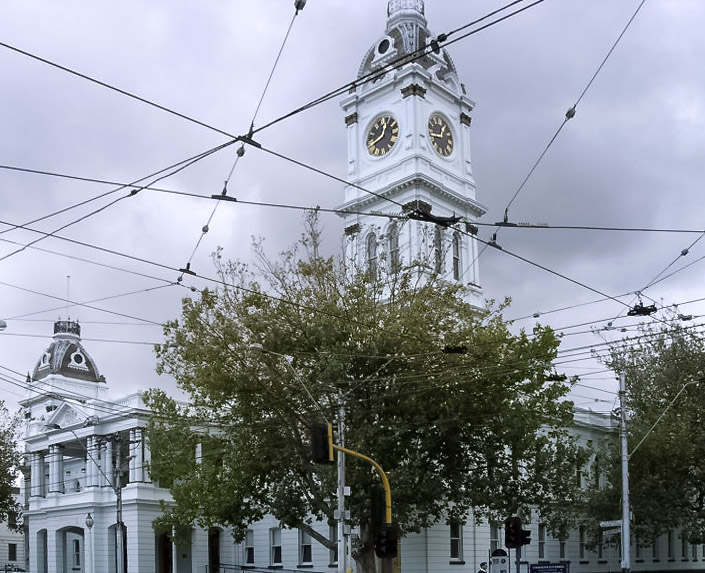
Stonnington City Centre, which includes Stonnington Council, Malvern Town Hall & Malvern Police Station

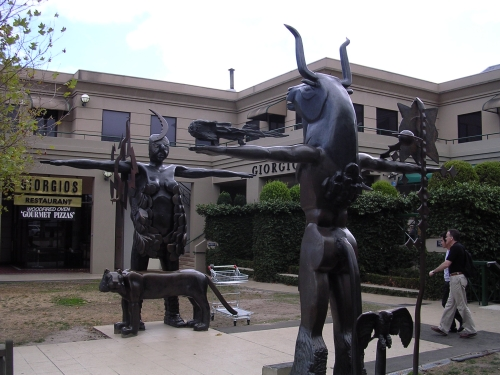
Sculptures in the City Square

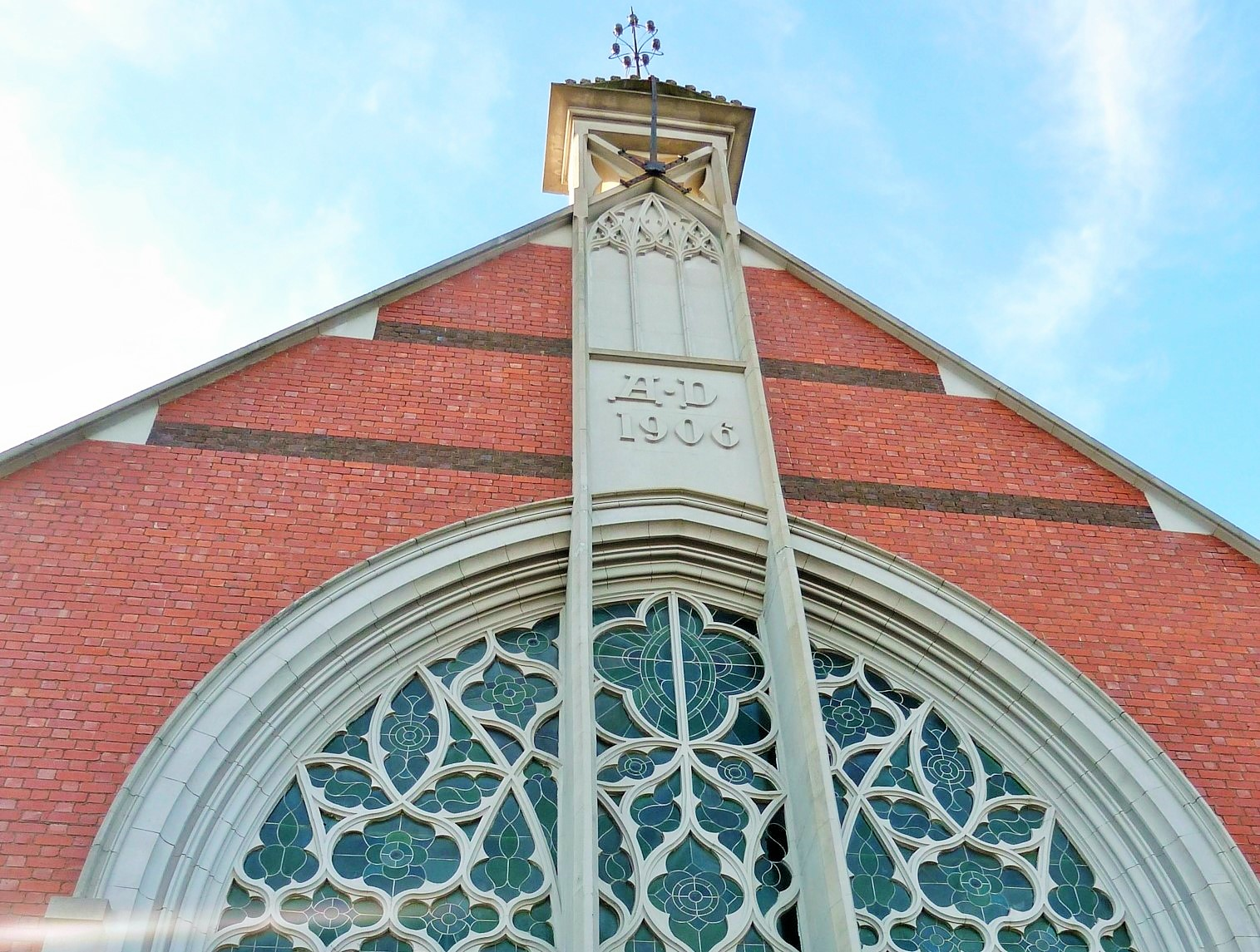
Malvern Presbyterian Church

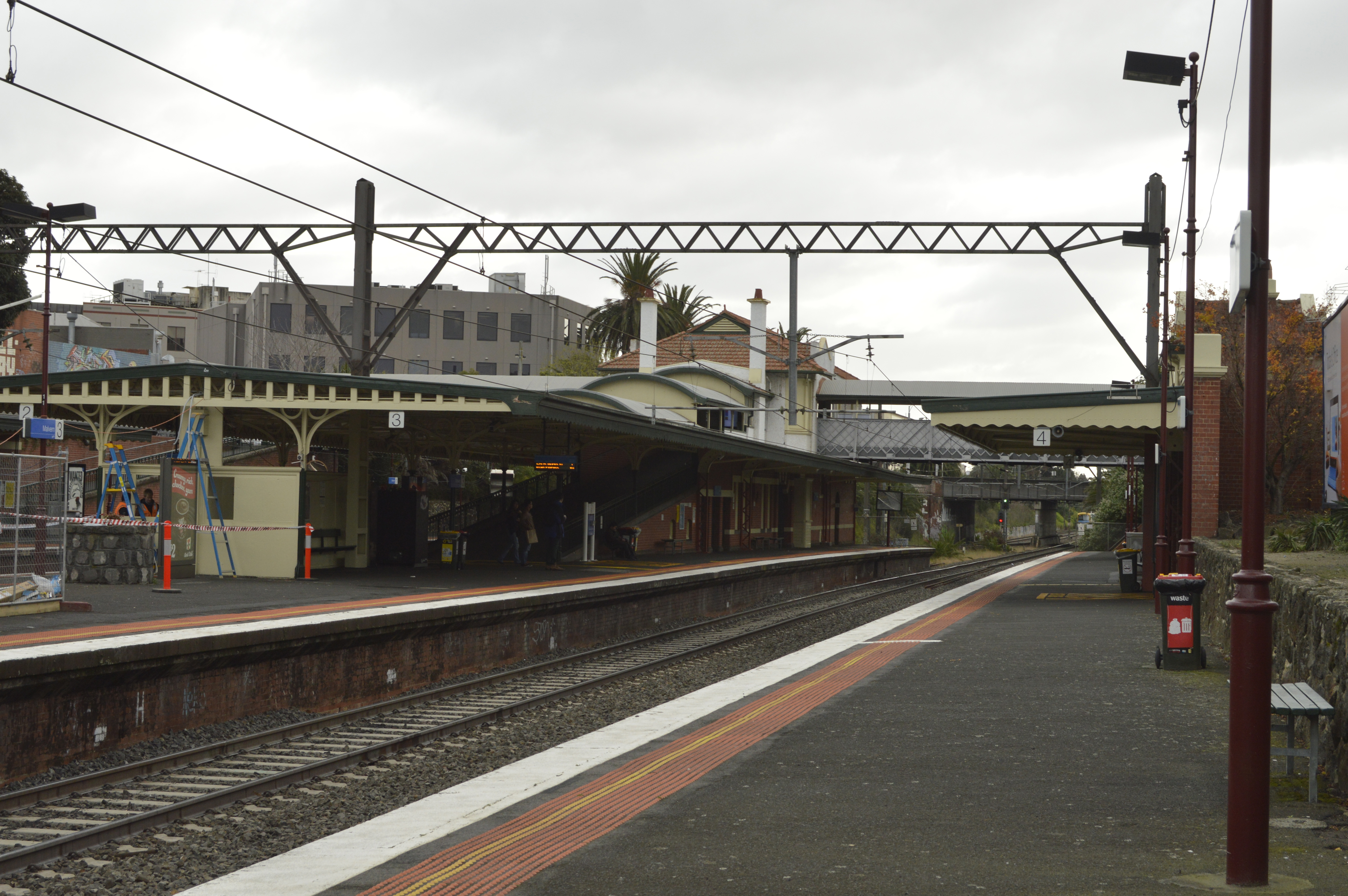
Malvern railway station

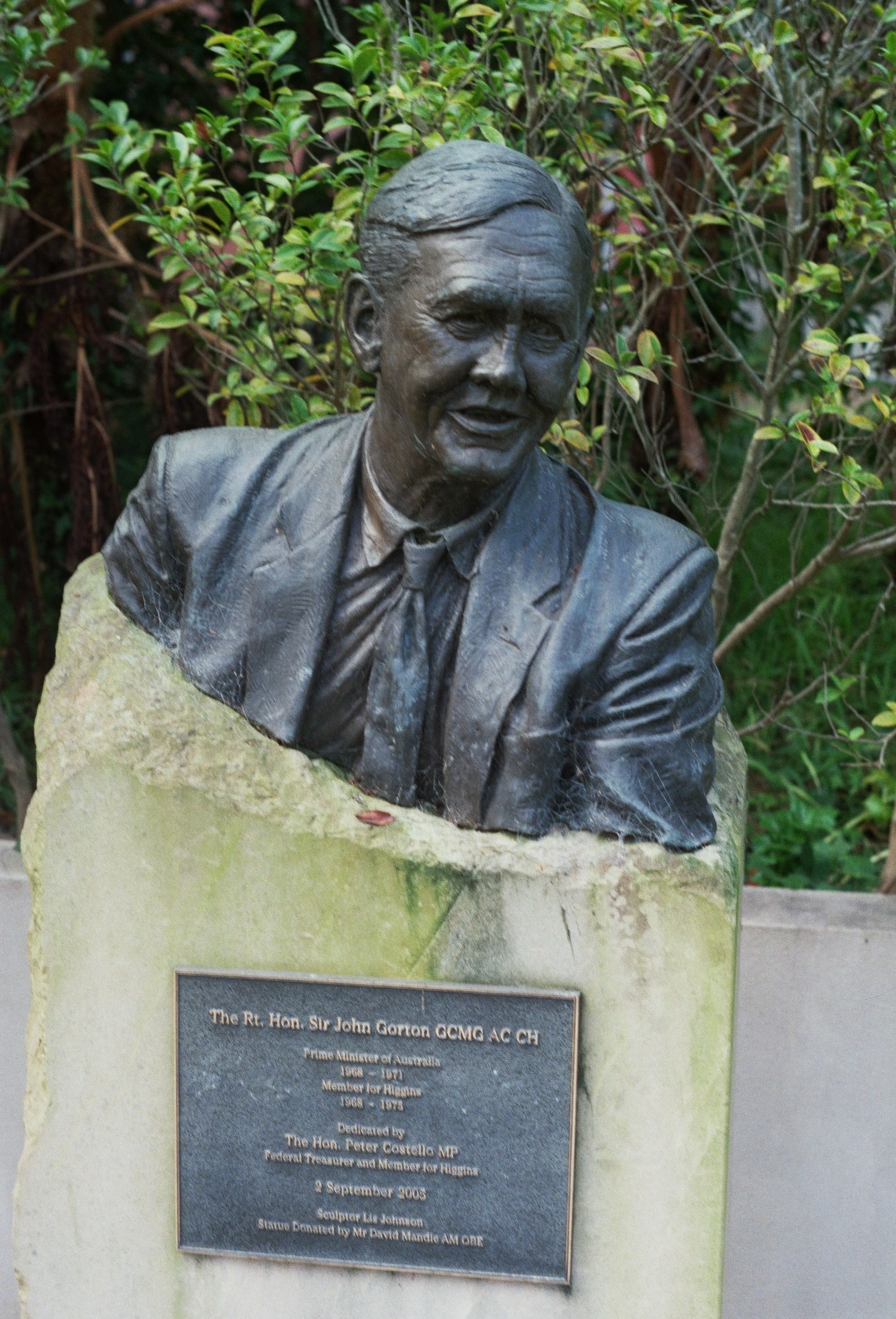
Gorton statue

== See also ==
- City of Malvern – Malvern was previously within this former local government area.
