= City of Malvern =

Former local government area in Victoria, Australia

Coordinates: 37°51′S 145°02′E

City of Malvern Victoria
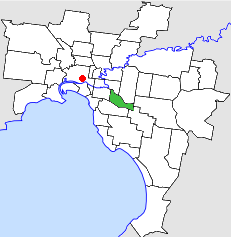
- Location in Melbourne
- The extent of the City of Malvern at its dissolution in 1994
- Population: 43,600 (1992)
  - Density: 2,746/km^{2} (7,111/sq mi)
- Established: 1856
- Area: 15.88 km^{2} (6.1 sq mi)
- Council seat: Malvern
- Region: Southeastern Melbourne
- County: Bourke
LGAs around City of Malvern:
Hawthorn	Camberwell	Waverley
Prahran	City of Malvern	Oakleigh
Caulfield	Caulfield	Oakleigh

The City of Malvern was a local government area about 9 kilometres (6 mi) southeast of Melbourne, the state capital of Victoria, Australia. The city covered an area of 15.88 square kilometres (6.13 sq mi), and existed from 1856 until 1994, when it was merged with the City of Prahran to create the City of Stonnington.

== History ==
Malvern was incorporated as the Gardiner Road District on 17 October 1856, which became the Shire of Gardiner on 26 May 1871. It was renamed the Shire of Malvern on 15 February 1878. It then became a borough on 22 February 1901, a town on 24 April 1901 and a city on 30 May 1911.

In the 1990s, it was originally planned for the City of Malvern to be abolished, with the northern half of the City of Malvern merging with City of Prahran to form a City of Stonnington, and the remaining southern half merging with City of Caulfield to form a City of Gardiner. On 22 June 1994, the entirety of the City of Malvern and the City of Prahran were merged to form the City of Stonnington. The creation of the City of Gardiner never eventuated, with Caulfield instead merging with parts of City of Moorabbin to form the City of Glen Eira.

Council meetings were held at the Malvern Town Hall, at Glenferrie Road and High Street, Malvern. It presently serves as a service centre for the City of Stonnington.

== Wards ==
The City of Malvern was subdivided in October 1980 into four wards — Centre, East, North and South — each electing three councillors.

== Suburbs ==
- Armadale (shared with the City of Prahran)
- Glen Iris (shared with the City of Camberwell)
- Kooyong
- Malvern*
- Malvern East
- Toorak (shared with the City of Prahran)

* Council seat.

== Population ==
Year	Population
1954	46,910
1958	45,800*
1961	47,870
1966	49,975
1971	50,560
1976	45,566
1981	43,211
1986	41,777
1991	41,340

* Estimate in the 1958 Victorian Year Book.
