= City of Prahran =

Coordinates: 37°51′25″S 145°02′10″E

- Local government area
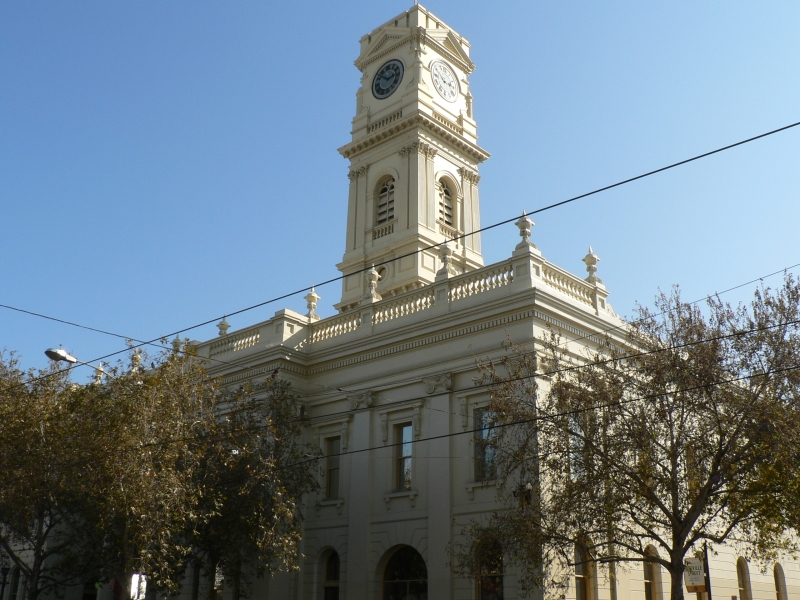
- Prahran Town Hall

- The extent of the City of Prahran at its dissolution in 1994
- Country: Australia
- State: Victoria
- Region: Inner Melbourne
- Established: 1855
- Council seat: Prahran

Area
  - Total: 9.55 km^{2} (3.69 sq mi)

Population
  - Total(s): 42,200 (1992)
  - Density: 4,419/km^{2} (11,445/sq mi)
- County: Bourke
LGAs around City of Prahran
Melbourne	Richmond	Hawthorn
South Melbourne	City of Prahran	Malvern
St Kilda	St Kilda	Caulfield

The City of Prahran was a local government area about 5 kilometres (3 mi) southeast of Melbourne, the state capital of Victoria, Australia. The city covered an area of 9.55 square kilometres (3.69 sq mi), and existed from 1855 until 1994, when it was merged with the City of Malvern to create the City of Stonnington.

== History ==
Prahran (/pɛ'ræn/) was incorporated as a municipal district on 24 April 1855, and became a borough on 1 October 1863, a town on 13 May 1870, and a city on 30 May 1879.

On 22 June 1994, the City of Prahran was abolished, and along with the City of Malvern, was merged into the newly created City of Stonnington. Parts of Windsor were transferred to the newly created City of Port Phillip. The residential district of South Yarra was transferred to the City of Melbourne.

Council meetings were held at the Prahran Town Hall, at Chapel Street and Greville Street, Prahran. It presently serves as a service centre for the City of Stonnington.

== Wards ==
The City of Prahran was subdivided into four wards on 2 December 1887, each electing three councillors:

- Prahran Ward
- South Yarra Ward
- Toorak Ward
- Windsor Ward

== Suburbs ==
- Armadale (shared with the City of Malvern)
- Melbourne (Domain district)
- Prahran*
- South Yarra
- Toorak (shared with the City of Malvern)
- Windsor

* Council seat.

== Population ==
Year	Population
1861	9,886
1881	21,268
1891	39,703
1921	50,290
1947	59,882
1954	54,009
1958	51,500*
1961	52,554
1966	54,629
1971	56,766
1976	48,462
1981	45,018
1986	43,051
1991	42,195

* Estimate in the 1958 Victorian Year Book.
