= Malvern railway station, Melbourne =

Railway station in Melbourne, Australia

Malvern
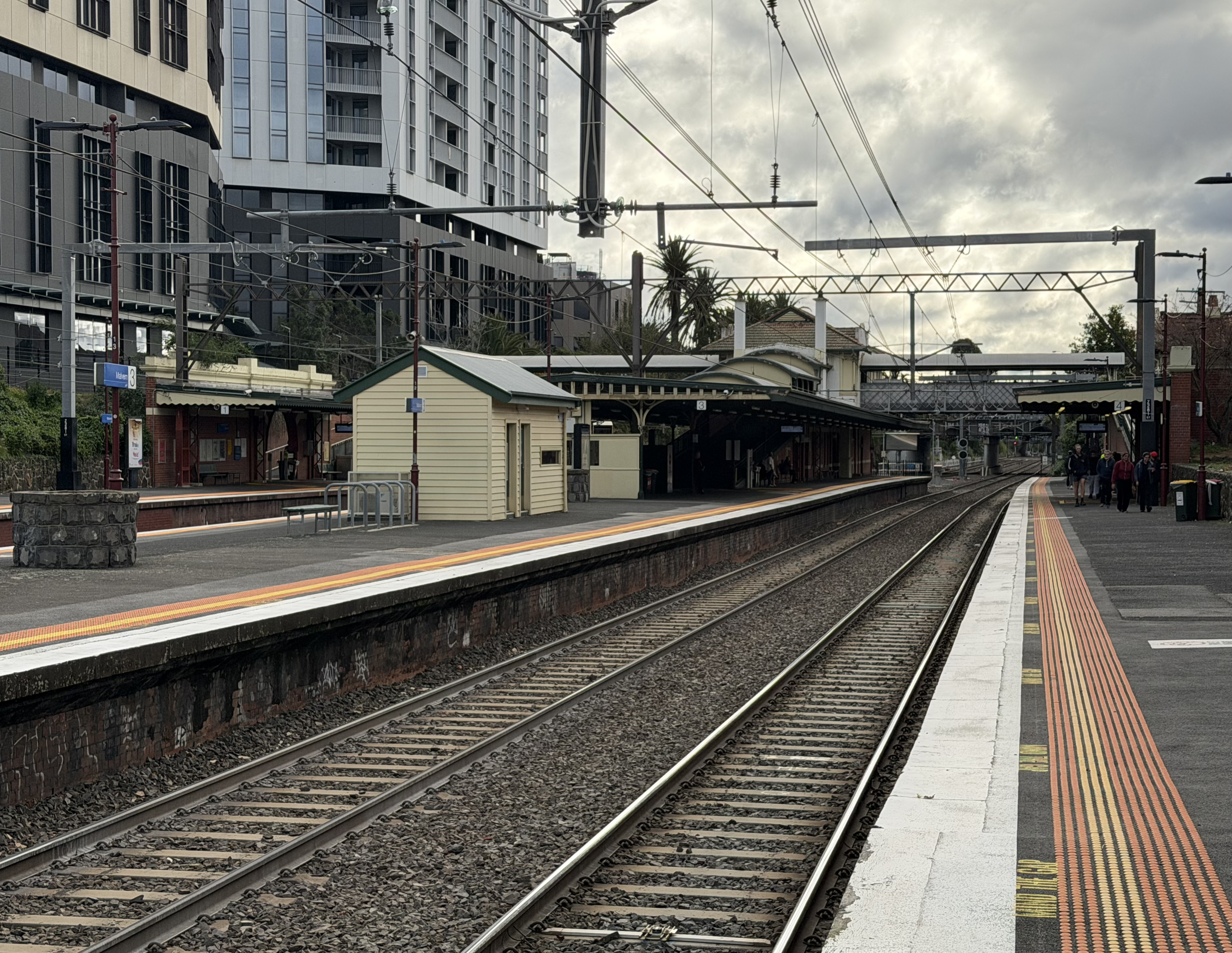
- North-west bound view from Platform 4, June 2026

General information
- Location: Station Street, Malvern, Victoria 3144 City of Stonnington; Australia
- Coordinates: 37°51′59″S 145°01′44″E
- System: PTV commuter rail station
- Owner: VicTrack
- Operator: Metro Trains
- Lines: Cranbourne Pakenham; Frankston
- Distance: 10.11 kilometres from Southern Cross
- Platforms: 4 (2 side, 1 island)
- Tracks: 4
- Connections: Tram

Construction
- Structure type: Lowered
- Accessible: No—steep ramp

Other information
- Status: Operational, host station
- Station code: MAL
- Fare zone: Myki zone 1
- Website: Public Transport Victoria

History
- Opened: 7 May 1879; 147 years ago
- Rebuilt: 1914
- Electrified: March 1922 (1500 V DC overhead)

Passengers
- 2017–2018: 953,261
- 2018–2019: 832,800 ▼12.63%
- 2019–2020: 586,650 ▼29.55%
- 2020–2021: 340,300 ▼41.99%
- 2021–2022: 371,100 ▲9.05%

Services
Preceding station	Metro Trains	Following station
Services to Town Hall
Anzac towards Watergardens or Sunbury via Metro Tunnel	Cranbourne line	Caulfield towards Cranbourne or East Pakenham
Anzac towards Watergardens or Sunbury via Metro Tunnel	Pakenham line	Caulfield towards Cranbourne or East Pakenham
Services to Flinders Street
Armadale towards Flinders Street via City Loop	Frankston line	Caulfield towards Frankston
South Yarra Citybound only towards Flinders Street via City Loop	Frankston line Express services	Caulfield One-way operation
Former services
Preceding station	Metro Trains	Following station
Armadale towards Flinders Street	Pakenham line	Caulfield towards Pakenham or Cranbourne
Armadale towards Flinders Street	Cranbourne line	Caulfield towards Pakenham or Cranbourne
Track layout
Location

Malvern station is a railway station operated by Metro Trains Melbourne on the Frankston, Pakenham and Cranbourne lines, all part of the Melbourne rail network. It serves the southern border of Malvern, a suburb of Melbourne in Victoria, Australia. It was opened on 7 May 1879.

The station complex consists of an island platform and two side platforms all accessed by a pedestrian bridge. There are two red brick Edwardian-era station buildings, constructed in 1914 as ticketing and staff offices. The entire complex is listed on the Victorian Heritage Register because of its architectural significance and its role in the development of Malvern as a significant metropolitan centre. The station is only partially accessible because of multiple steep access ramps.

Malvern railway station is served by the Cranbourne, Pakenham and Frankston lines. The station also connects to route 5, 16 and 64 tram services. The journey to Flinders Street railway station is approximately 8.5 km (5.3 mi) and takes 15 minutes, with express services to Town Hall via the Metro Tunnel taking about 12 minutes.

== Description ==
Malvern railway station is on the boundary of Malvern and Caulfield North, suburbs of Melbourne, Victoria. East of the station is Glenferrie Road, and south of the station is Dandenong Road. The station is located nearby to the Glenferrie Road shopping precinct, Malvern Central shopping centre, and the Malvern Collective apartments. The station is owned by VicTrack, a state government agency, and is operated by Metro Trains. The station is 8.5 km (5.3 mi), or a 15-minute train journey, from Flinders Street station. The adjacent stations are Armadale station up towards Melbourne and Caulfield station down towards Dandenong or Frankston.

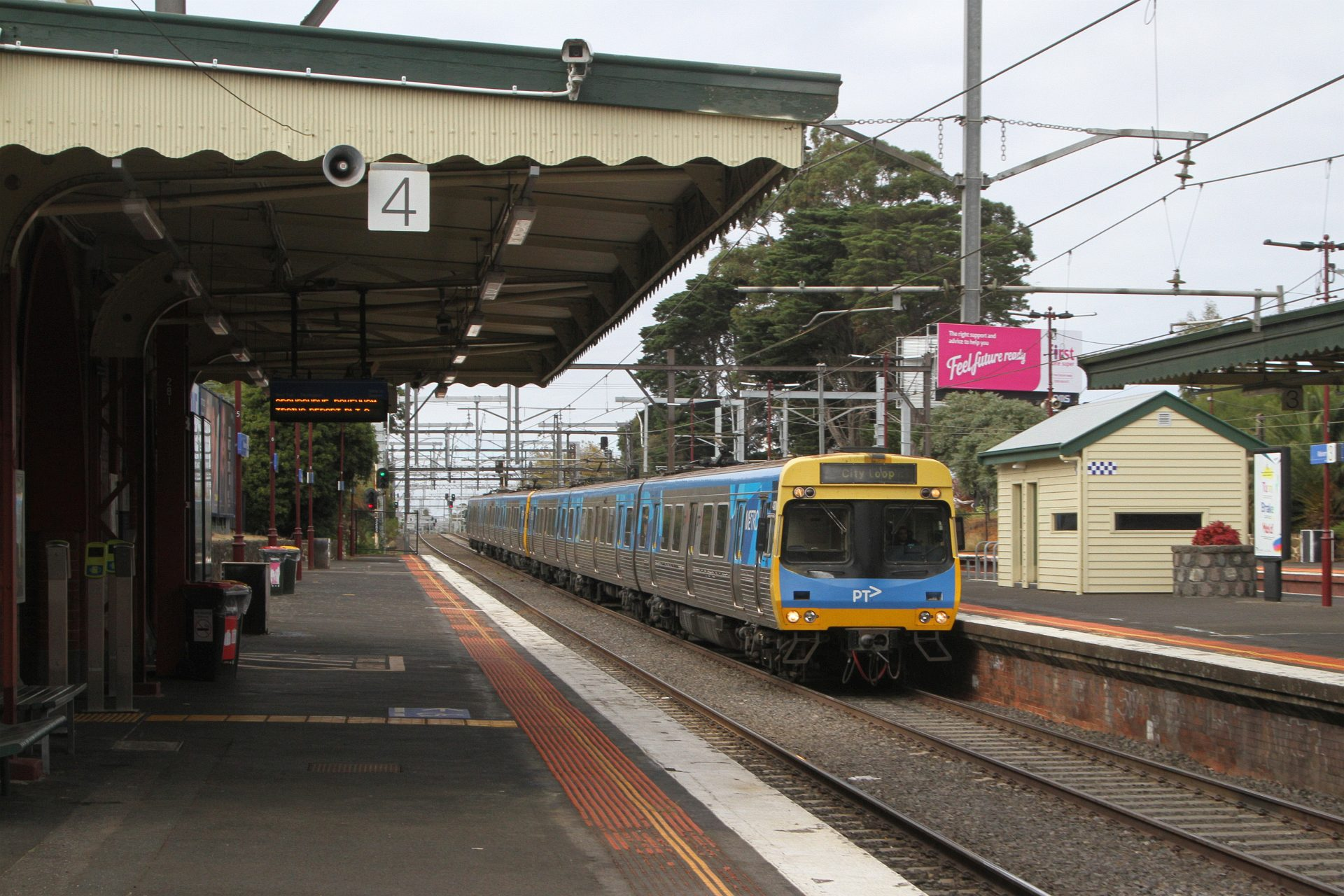
Distinct Edwardian architectural features are pictured on the platform 4 shelter and entrance building, amongst other structures around the station

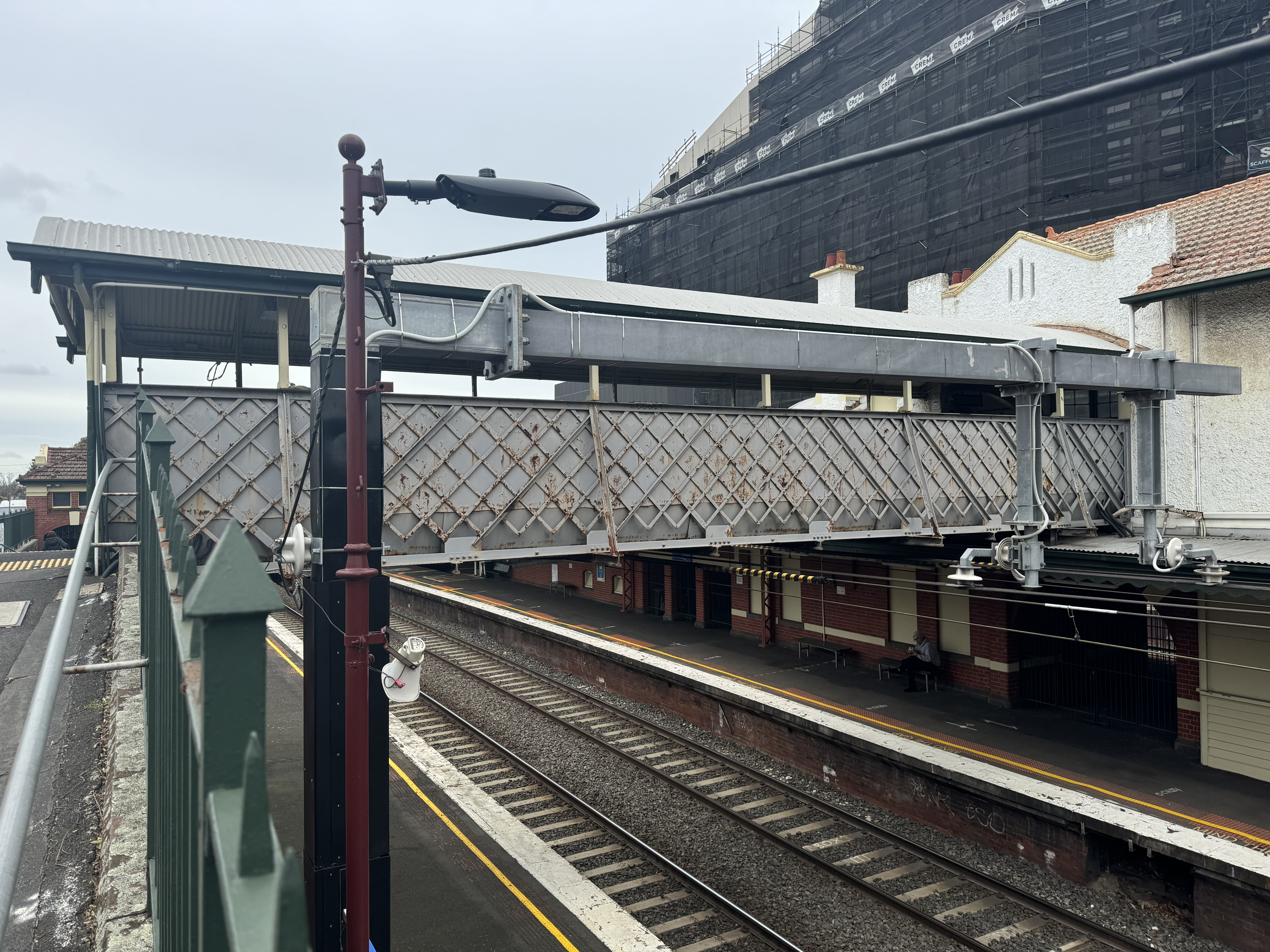
Distinct footbridge taken over Platforms 3 and 4, which was installed in 1914

The station consists of a single island platform and two side platforms. The platforms are of standard design for the Melbourne commuter rail network, with an asphalt surface and concrete edges. The platforms are approximately 160 metres (524.93 ft) long, enough for a Metro Trains 7-car High Capacity Metro Train (HCMT). The station features a pedestrian bridge, accessed from the centre of the platforms by a ramp. The station has two station buildings that were former ticketing offices and are now used as staff facilities. Distinct Edwardian architectural features of the two red brick station buildings include tiled hip roof with terracotta finials, tall chimneys with terracotta pots, ornate parapets, cement banding, and stucco walls. These features are similar to those of other stations constructed in eastern Melbourne in the same period, including the nearby stations Hawksburn, Toorak, and Armadale. The entire complex is listed on the Victorian Heritage Register because of its architectural significance and its role in the development of Malvern as a significant metropolitan centre.

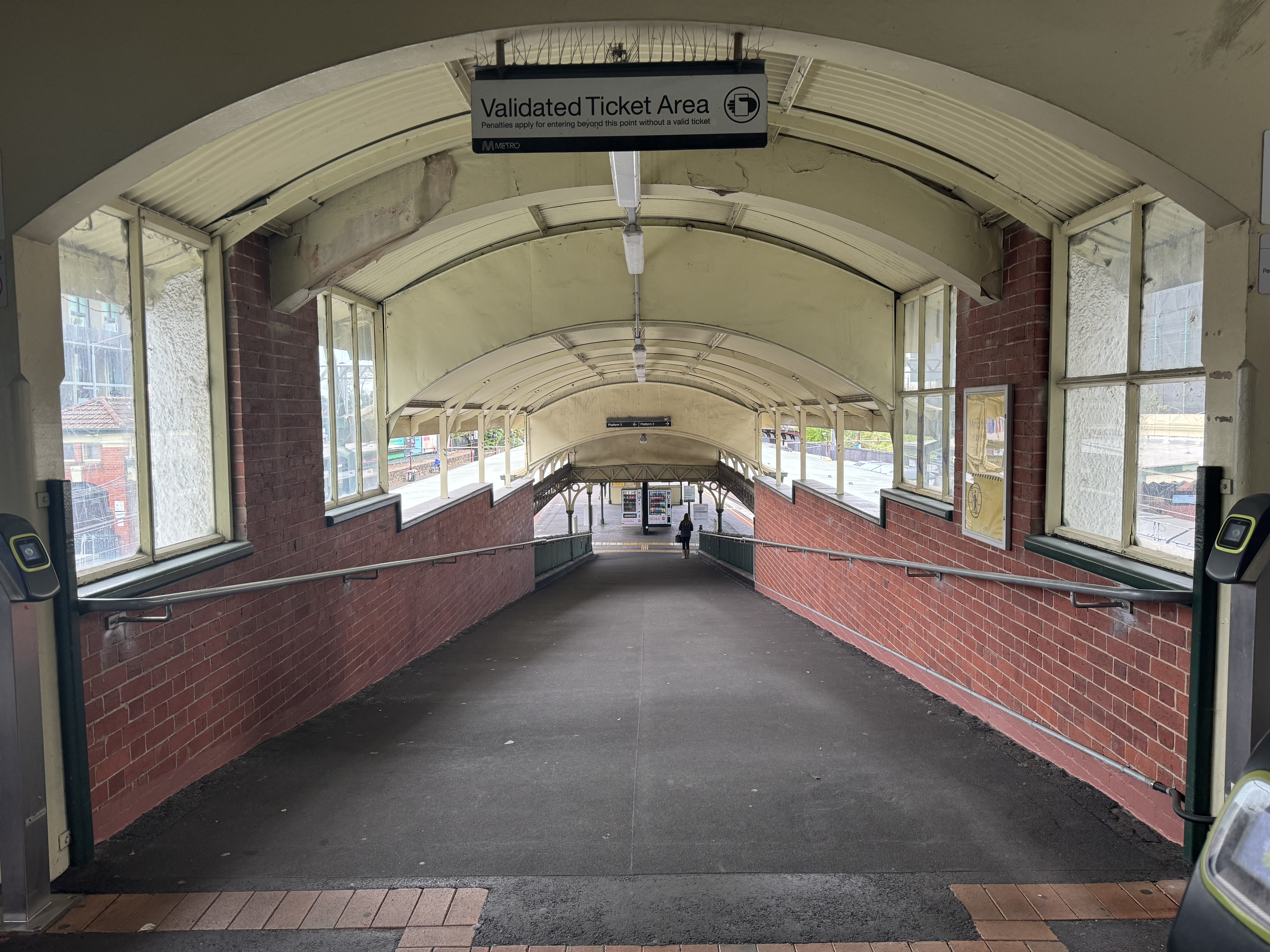
The station has partially accessible ramps, which are steep for wheelchair access

There is no dedicated car-parking available at the station, instead there are a limited number of on-street parking spaces for travellers to use. The station is listed as an "assisted access" station on the Metro Trains website, as the access ramp is too steep and would require assistance for wheelchair customers to traverse.

== History ==
Malvern station is situated on Crown Allotment 59, purchased in 1854 by Thomas Fulton, Lauchlan Mackinnon, and Frederick Sargood for a sum of £310. The land was promptly divided into smaller plots, and by 1865, property at the intersection of Glenferrie Road and Dandenong Road had been purchased by William Chandler, a market gardener. In 1874, the Secretary of the Malvern Shire, Smith Ellis, lobbied the Commissioner of Roads and Railways, arguing for the proposed Gippsland Railway to be routed through Malvern. He claimed that the route would capture a substantial portion of the daily commuter traffic that was currently using other means of transport to and from the city. In 1877, the State Government obtained the assets of the Melbourne and Hobson's Bay United Railway Company. A decision was reached to extend the railway line from South Yarra through Malvern, Caulfield, and Oakleigh. This extension would link the suburban railway network with the government's country service, providing access to Gippsland. During the surveying of the Malvern section, the railway line's path crossed William Chandler's property, including his house and land. Consequently, in 1878, the Board of Land and Works acquired his property for the purpose of constructing the railway.

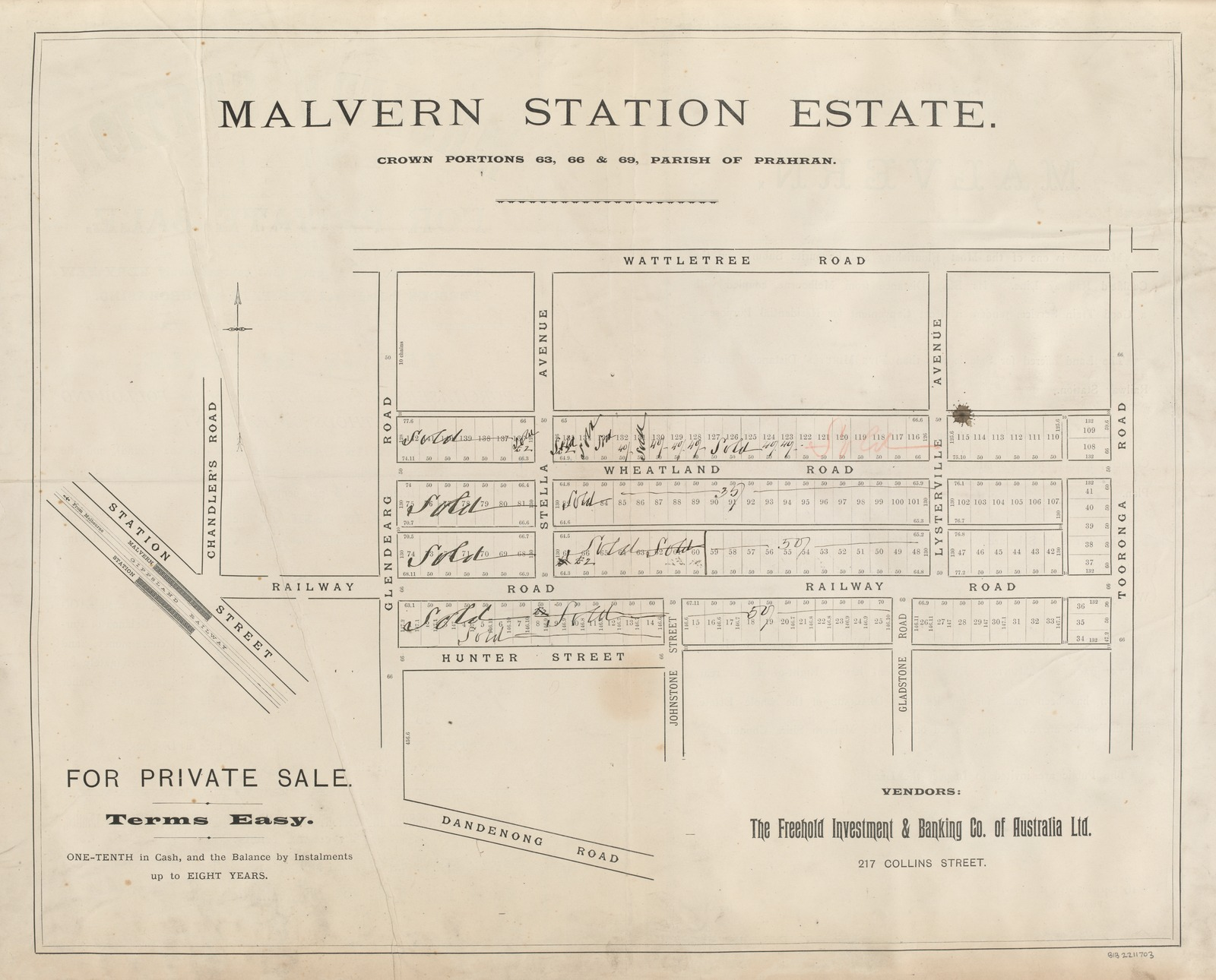
Early map of planned housing estate adjacent to Malvern railway station

Malvern railway station was opened on 7 May 1879, with the station consisting of a single platform and track for commuter and freight service. Like the suburb itself, the station was named after the Malvern Hill Estate. The housing lots within the estate were sold by barrister Charles Skinner in 1856, who named the estate after the Malvern Hills in Herefordshire, England. The first station buildings were opened on the site between 1881 and 1883 to coincide with the duplication of track between the city and Oakleigh. In 1888, postal authorities established an office at the station due to the high volume of mail passing through the station.

The current station was constructed in 1914. It was designed by James Hardy, chief architect for the Department of Way and Works, to provide improved and additional facilities to what had become an increasingly busy and important location on the train network. The station rebuild was part of level crossing removal works that removed all level crossings, rebuilt all stations, and quadruplicated the corridor between South Yarra and Caulfield by 1914. Whilst these removals did bring positive safety benefits to the community, reports have highlighted that these works incidentally made pedestrian conditions worse, due to limited pedestrian crossings around the station and difficult transfers with tram services. Later in 1922, the line was electrified using 1500 V DC overhead wires, with three-position signalling also introduced.

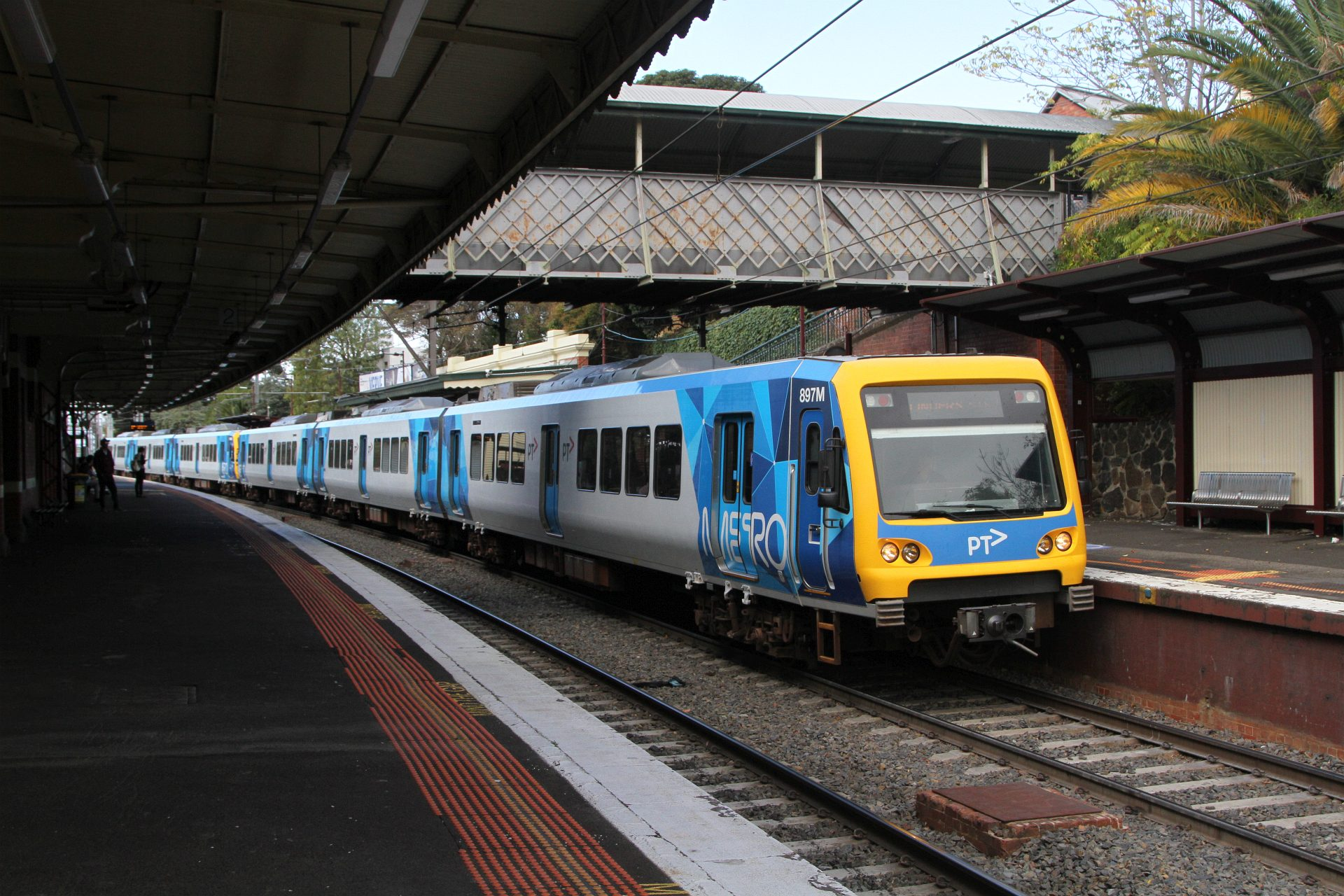
Platform shelters were installed on platform 1 in the early 2010s

In 1924, gas lighting at the station was replaced with electric lights. In 1988, the former electrified goods yard were removed. This platform had been used for cargo and postal deliveries during its operational life, however was decommissioned after the reduction in use. The station underwent minor upgrades with the installation of new shelters on Platform 1 in the 2010s. In September 2021, High Capacity Metro Trains used on the Pakenham and Cranbourne lines were certified to stop at platforms 3 and 4 only, due to the Frankston line not receiving approval for their use.

In 2015, Stonnington Council rezoned land surrounding the station to allow for higher density residential and commercial development. Following this decision, Kokoda Property acquired multiple parcels of land immediately south of the station to construct two apartment towers. The $260 million development, known as the Malvern Collective, consists of two towers, one with 73 apartments and the other with 192. The project also includes the construction of a small supermarket, offices, and other retail spaces. The project is currently under construction and set to be complete by 2024.

== Incidents ==
Numerous incidents have occurred at the station since its opening in 1879. In the period from 1879 to 1888, there were three fatal accidents at the station. A fire occurred at the joinery works adjacent to the station in 1911, causing about £2000 worth of property. Another four fatalities at the station occurred between 1918 and 1940.

In 1935, a cow escaped from its herd near Dandenong and Orrong roads in Armadale and made its way to the platforms at Malvern station. The cow injured a woman who was knocked over in the process, with the cow eventually being caught in a nearby garage.

In September 1936, a 47-year-old woman fell from the platform moments before a train arrived and flung herself between the rails. The train's first carriage passed over the spot where she lay, with only about 18 inches of clearance. Despite the ordeal, she only suffered minor facial abrasions and shock.

In June 2014, a 17 year old Beaumaris male was fatally injured when he leaned out of a moving train 200 m from Malvern station. The teenager, accompanied by two others, had broken into the back carriage of the Frankston-bound train before leaning outside. The teenager's head struck a fixed object, and he later died from his injuries.

== Platforms and services ==
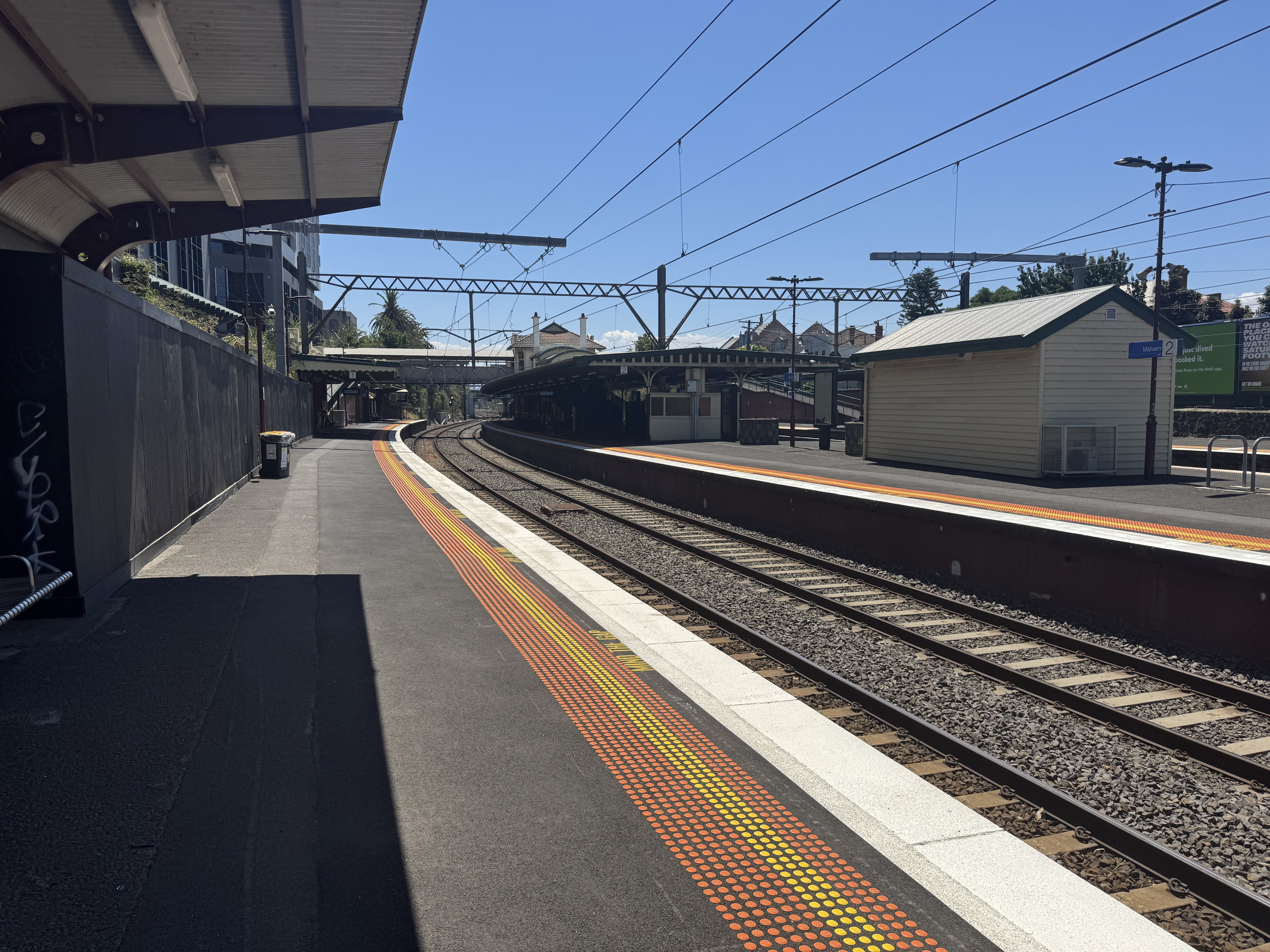
North-east bound view from Platform 1, February 2025

Malvern station is currently served by the Cranbourne, Frankston & Pakenham lines. The Cranbourne & Pakenham lines run outbound as a combined service to Dandenong station before splitting off with the Pakenham line terminating at East Pakenham station and the Cranbourne line terminating at Cranbourne station. Citybound, both lines towards Sunbury via Town Hall and the Metro Tunnel. The Frankston line heads outbound to Frankston station with connecting services to Stony Point at Frankston. Citybound, the Frankston line runs to Flinders Street station via the City Loop.

Malvern platform arrangement
Platform	Line	Destination	Via	Service Type	Notes	Source
1	Frankston line	Flinders Street	City Loop	All stations		
2	Frankston line	Cheltenham, Mordialloc, Carrum or Frankston		All stations	Services to Cheltenham, Mordialloc and Carrum only operate during weekday peaks.	
3	Cranbourne line Pakenham line	West Footscray, Watergardens or Sunbury	Town Hall	Limited express	Services to West Footscray only operate during weekday peaks and late nights.	
4	Cranbourne line Pakenham line	Westall, Dandenong, Cranbourne or East Pakenham		All stations	Services to Westall and Dandenong only operate during weekday peaks.	

== Transport links ==
Malvern station has three tram connections with no bus connections (except train replacement bus stops located adjacent to the station). The route 5 tram service operates from the nearby stop on Wattletree Road up towards the city and down towards Malvern. The route 16 tram service operates from nearby stop Glenferrie Road up towards the city and down towards Kew. The route 64 tram service operates from nearby Dandenong Road up towards the city and down towards East Brighton. The station has an accessible platform tram stop for routes 16 and 64 on Dandenong Road. The Route 16 stop outside the station on Glenferrie Road and the Route 5 stop on Wattletree Road are not wheelchair accessible as they both lack proper platforms.

Tram connections:

- : Melbourne University – Malvern
- : Melbourne University – Kew
- : Melbourne University – East Brighton
