= Ingpen =

Ingpen is an English surname. Notable people with the surname include:

- Abel Ingpen, English entomologist
- Edith Ingpen (1909–2006), Australian architect
- Joan Ingpen, English classical music talent agent
- Robert Ingpen (born 1936), Australian illustrator
