= Harry Grigg =

Australian rules footballer

Personal information
- Full name: Henry Alfred Grigg
- Born: 30 March 1899; Armadale, Victoria
- Died: 11 July 1977 (aged 78); Elsternwick, Victoria
- Original team: St Kilda Juniors
- Height: 174 cm (5 ft 9 in)
- Weight: 68 kg (150 lb)

Playing career^{1}
Years	Club	Games (Goals)
1919–21	St Kilda	18 (3)
- ^{1} Playing statistics correct to the end of 1921.

Henry Alfred Grigg (30 March 1899 – 11 July 1977) was an Australian rules footballer who played with St Kilda in the Victorian Football League (VFL).
