= Armadale railway station, Melbourne =

Railway station in Melbourne, Australia

Armadale
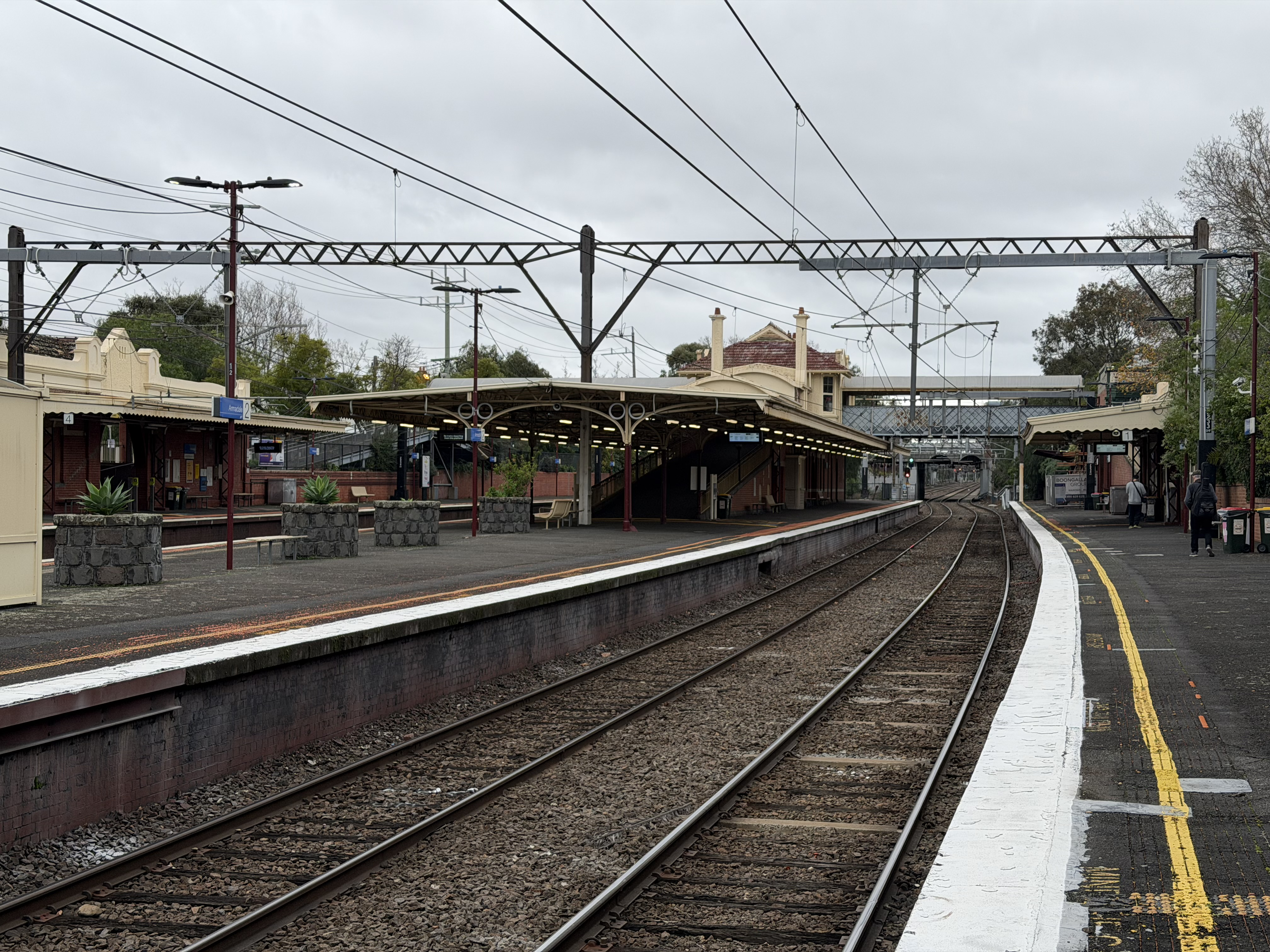
- Eastbound view from Platform 1, July 2026

General information
- Location: Morey Street, Armadale, Victoria 3143; City of Stonnington; Australia
- Coordinates: 37°51′23″S 145°01′09″E
- System: PTV commuter rail station
- Owner: VicTrack
- Operator: Metro Trains
- Line: Frankston
- Distance: 8.67 kilometres from Southern Cross
- Platforms: 4 (2 side, 1 island)
- Tracks: 4
- Connections: Tram; Bus

Construction
- Structure type: Below-grade
- Accessible: No—steep ramp

Other information
- Status: Operational, host station
- Station code: ARM
- Fare zone: Myki zone 1
- Website: Public Transport Victoria

History
- Opened: 7 May 1879; 147 years ago
- Rebuilt: 1914
- Electrified: March 1922 (1500 V DC overhead)

Passengers
- 2017–2018: 660,932
- 2018–2019: 582,450 ▼11.87%
- 2019–2020: 414,400 ▼28.85%
- 2020–2021: 227,300 ▼45.15%
- 2021–2022: 244,650 ▲7.63%
- 2022–2023: 370,550 ▲51.46%
- 2023–2024: 413,300 ▲11.54%
- 2024–2025: 469,600 ▲13.62%

Services
Preceding station	Metro Trains	Following station
Toorak towards Flinders Street via City Loop	Frankston line	Malvern towards Frankston
Pakenham line does not stop here
Cranbourne line does not stop here
Former services
Preceding station	Metro Trains	Following station
Toorak towards Flinders Street	Pakenham line	Malvern towards Pakenham or Cranbourne
Toorak towards Flinders Street	Cranbourne line	Malvern towards Pakenham or Cranbourne
Track layout
Location

Armadale station is a railway station operated by Metro Trains Melbourne on the Frankston line, which is part of the Melbourne rail network. It serves Armadale, a suburb of Melbourne, Victoria, Australia. The station is listed on the Victorian Heritage Register and was opened on 7 May 1879.

The station consists of an island platform and two side platforms, all accessed by a pedestrian bridge. There are two principal station buildings located on the central platform (platforms 2 and 3) and on platform 4, consisting of a small two and one-story brick buildings. These buildings were provided in 1914 as ticketing and staff offices. The station is only partially accessible due to the steep access ramps.

The station connects to the Route 6 tram service and the route 605 bus service. The journey to Flinders Street railway station is approximately 7.3 kilometres (4.5 mi) and takes 14 minutes.

== Description ==
Armadale railway station is located in the suburb of Armadale, a suburb of Melbourne, Victoria. The station is located nearby to the High Street shopping precinct and the heritage listed Kings Arcade. The station is owned by VicTrack, a state government agency, and the station is operated by Metro Trains. The station is approximately 7.3 kilometres (4.5 mi), or a 14-minute train journey, from Flinders Street station. The adjacent stations are Toorak station up towards Melbourne and Malvern station down towards Frankston.

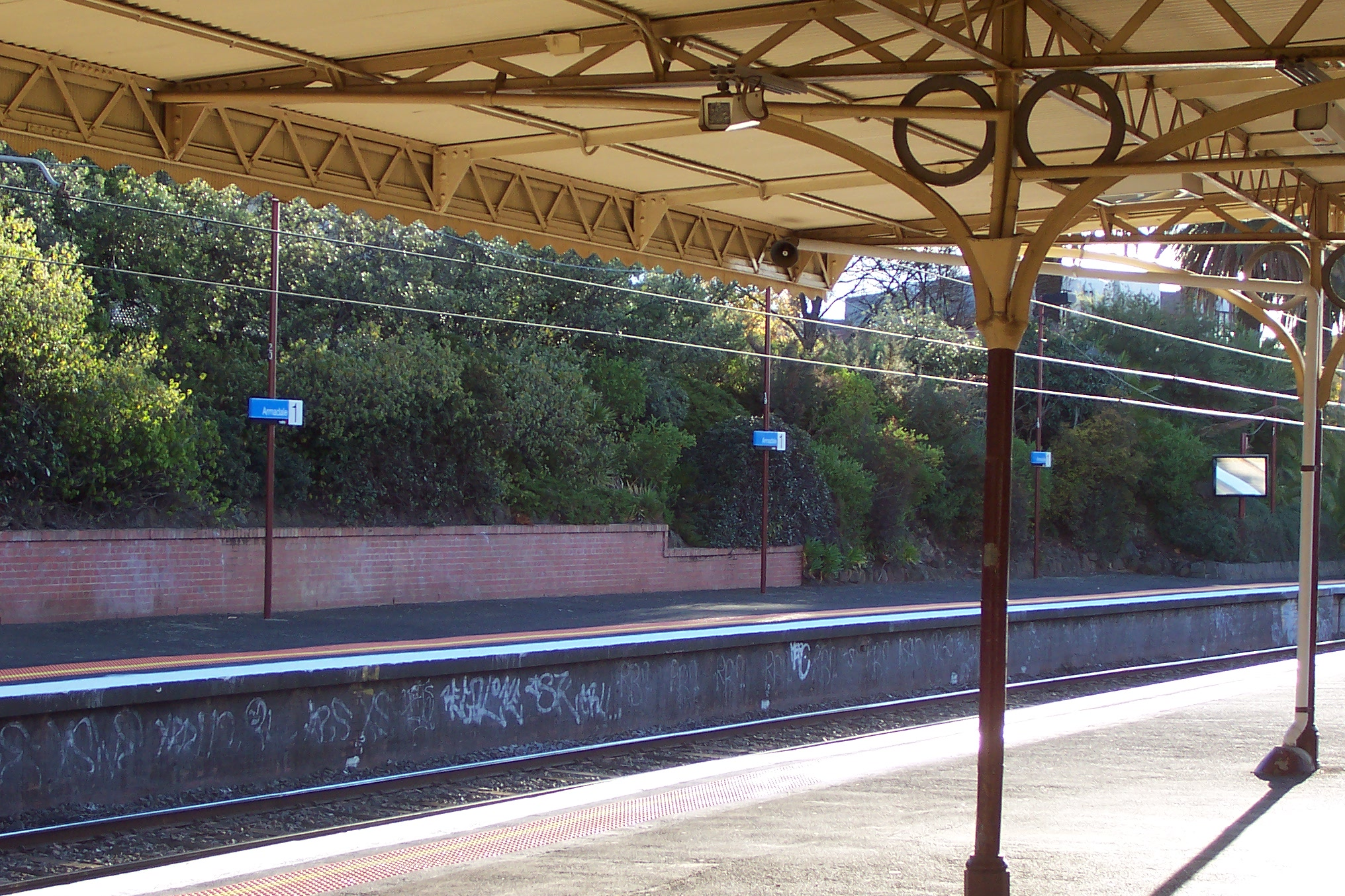
The heritage listed station structure on Platforms 2 and 3, January 2004

The station consists of a single island platform and two side platforms with a total of four platform edges. Standard in Melbourne, the platform has an asphalt surface with concrete on the edges. The platforms are approximately 160 metres (524.93 ft) long, enough for a Metro Trains 7-car HCMT. The station features a pedestrian bridge, accessed from the centre of the platforms by a ramp. The station features two principal station buildings, both former ticketing offices which are now heritage listed staff facilities. Distinct Edwardian architectural features of the red brick station buildings include ornate parapets, cement banding, tall chimneys with terracotta pots, tiled hip roof with terracotta finials, and stucco walls. An additional station building is present onsite, 14 Cheel Street. This building is a single-storey Edwardian-era shop listed as "A2" grade on the Victorian heritage register.

The station building, platform, and overpass are largely the same as when originally built, with the main change being updated signage, technology, and the addition of one new platform canopy amongst other minor building and platform upgrades. There is no car-parking available at the station. The station is listed as an "assisted access" station on the Metro Trains website, as the access ramp is too steep and would require assistance for wheelchair customers to traverse.

== History ==
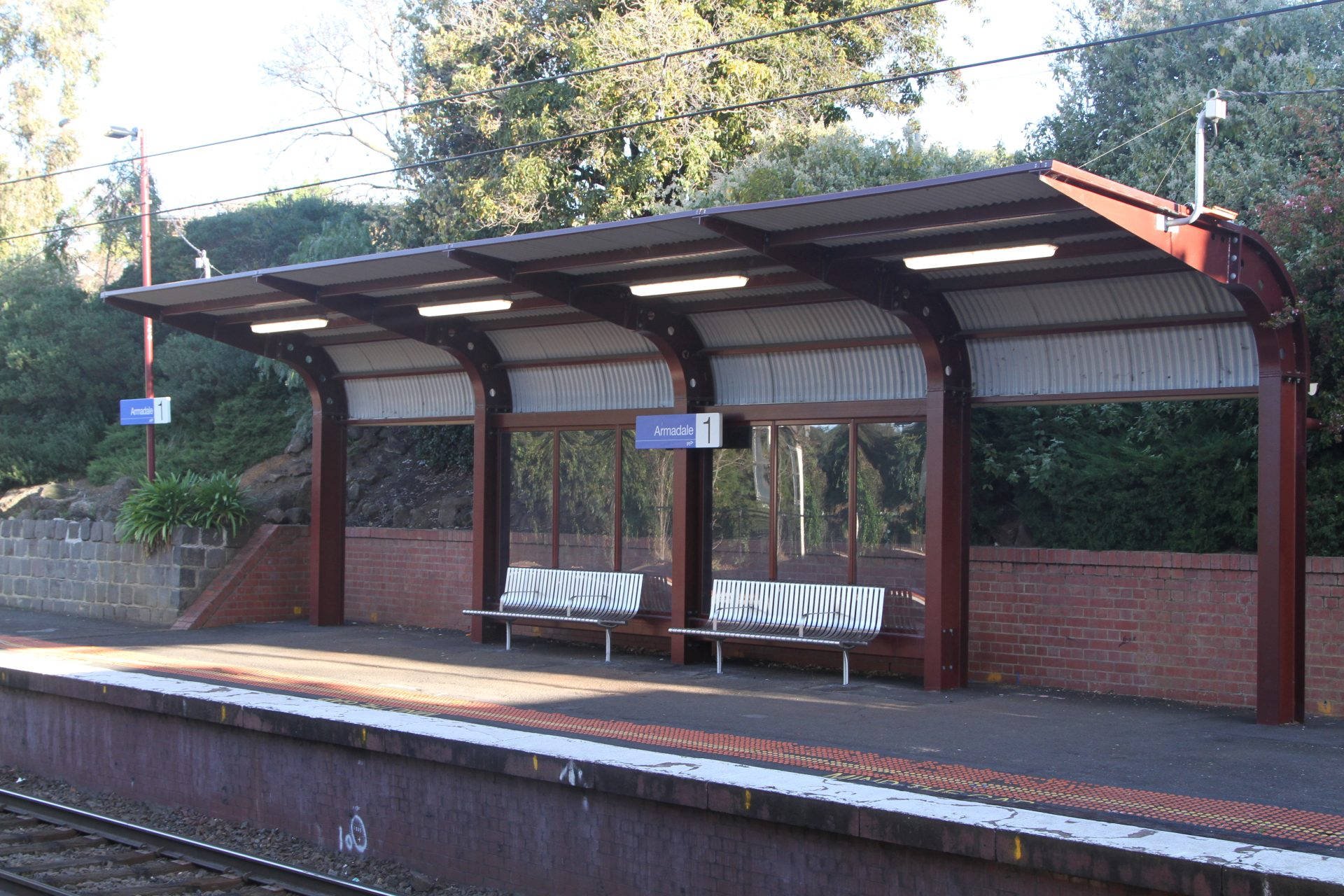
The heritage styled platform shelters installed in the 2010s.

Armadale railway station was opened on 7 May 1879, with the station consisting of a single platform and track for commuter and freight service. Like the suburb itself, the station was named after Armadale House the residence of former premier and attorney-general James Munro. The house was named after Armadale, Scotland, where Munro was born. The first station buildings were opened on the site between 1881 and 1883 to coincide with the duplication of track between the city and Oakleigh. The current station was constructed in 1914 to provide improved and additional facilities to what had become an increasingly busy and important location on the train network. The station rebuild was part of level crossing removal works that removed all level crossings, rebuilt all stations, and quadruplicated the corridor between South Yarra and Caulfield by 1914. Later in 1922, the line was electrified using 1500 V DC overhead wires with three-position signalling also introduced.

The station has mostly stayed the same since 1914, with only minor upgrades taking place. In 1972, the island platform (Platforms 2 and 3) was extended at both ends. In 1978, a former goods siding and associated point work were permanently closed before being removed. In 1993, major re-signalling works occurred between Toorak and Caulfield stations. The station underwent minor upgrades with the installation of a new shelter on Platform 1 in the 2010s. In 2021, resignalling works occurred to upgrade the corridor to high capacity signalling as part of the Metro Tunnel project.

=== 14 Cheel Street ===
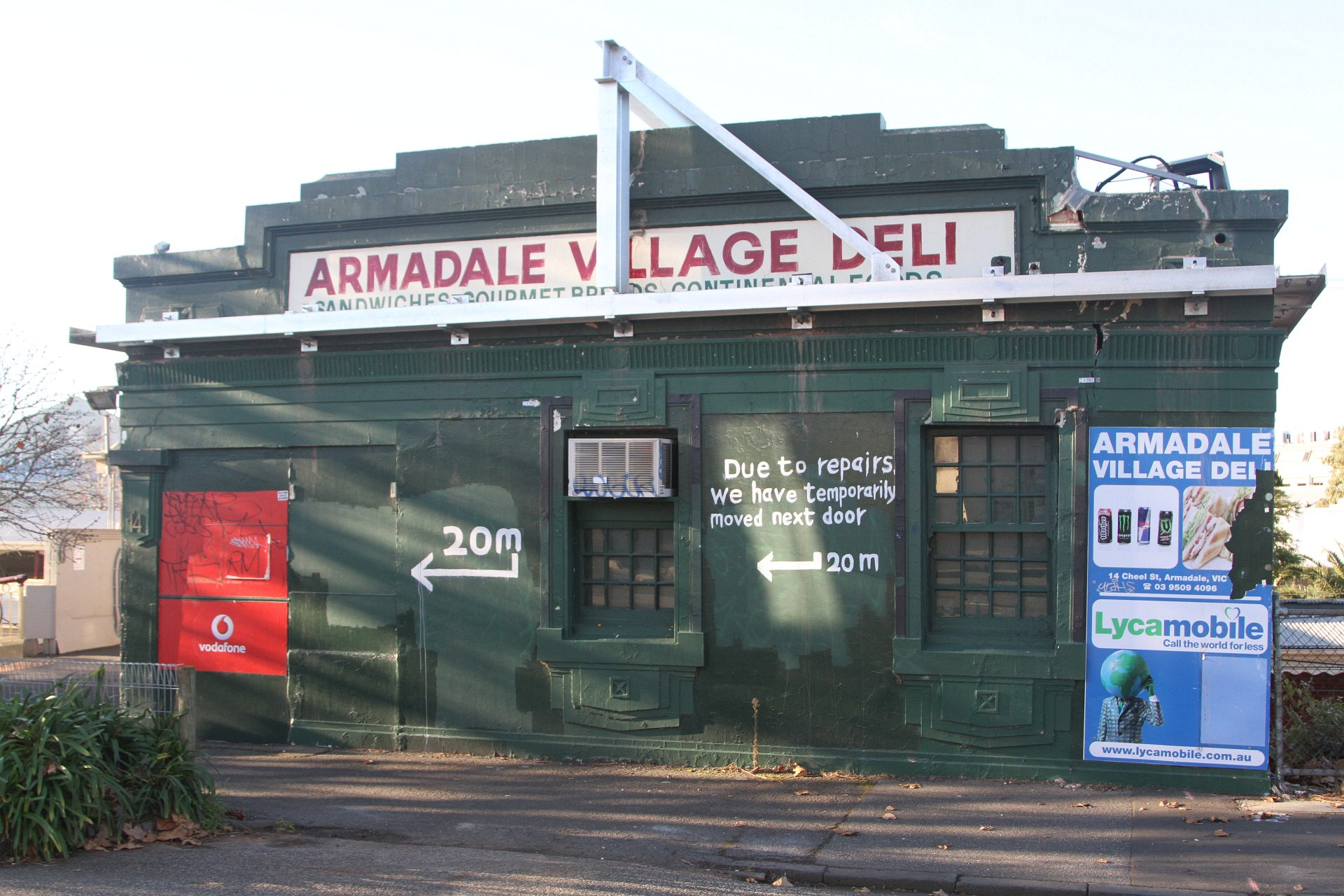
The single-storey shop with structural supports.

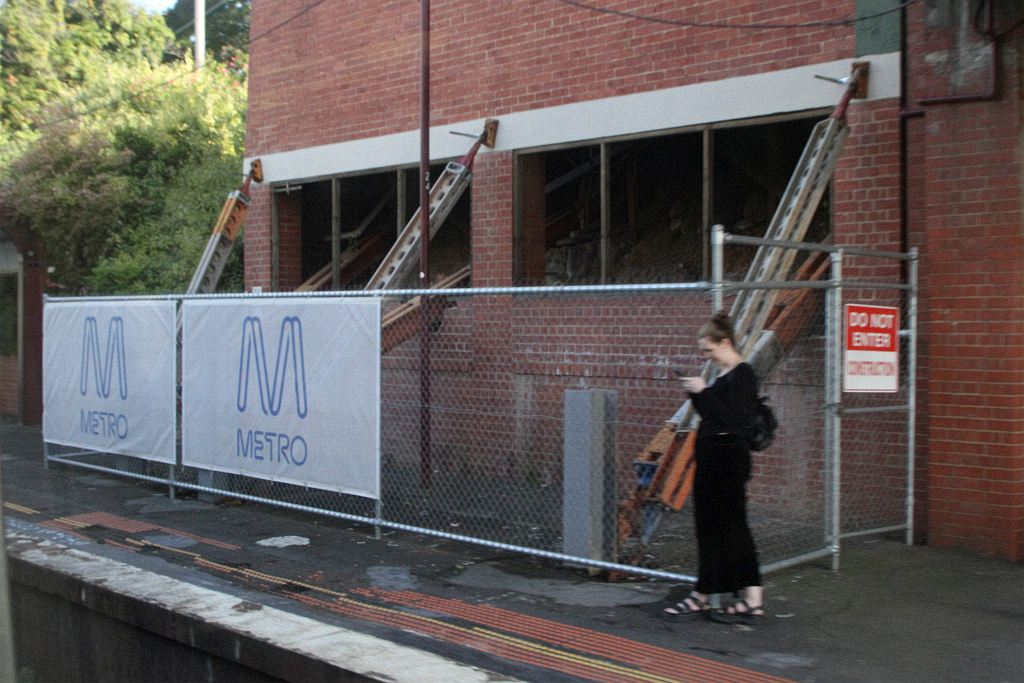
On platform level, a permanent fence and supports have been installed.

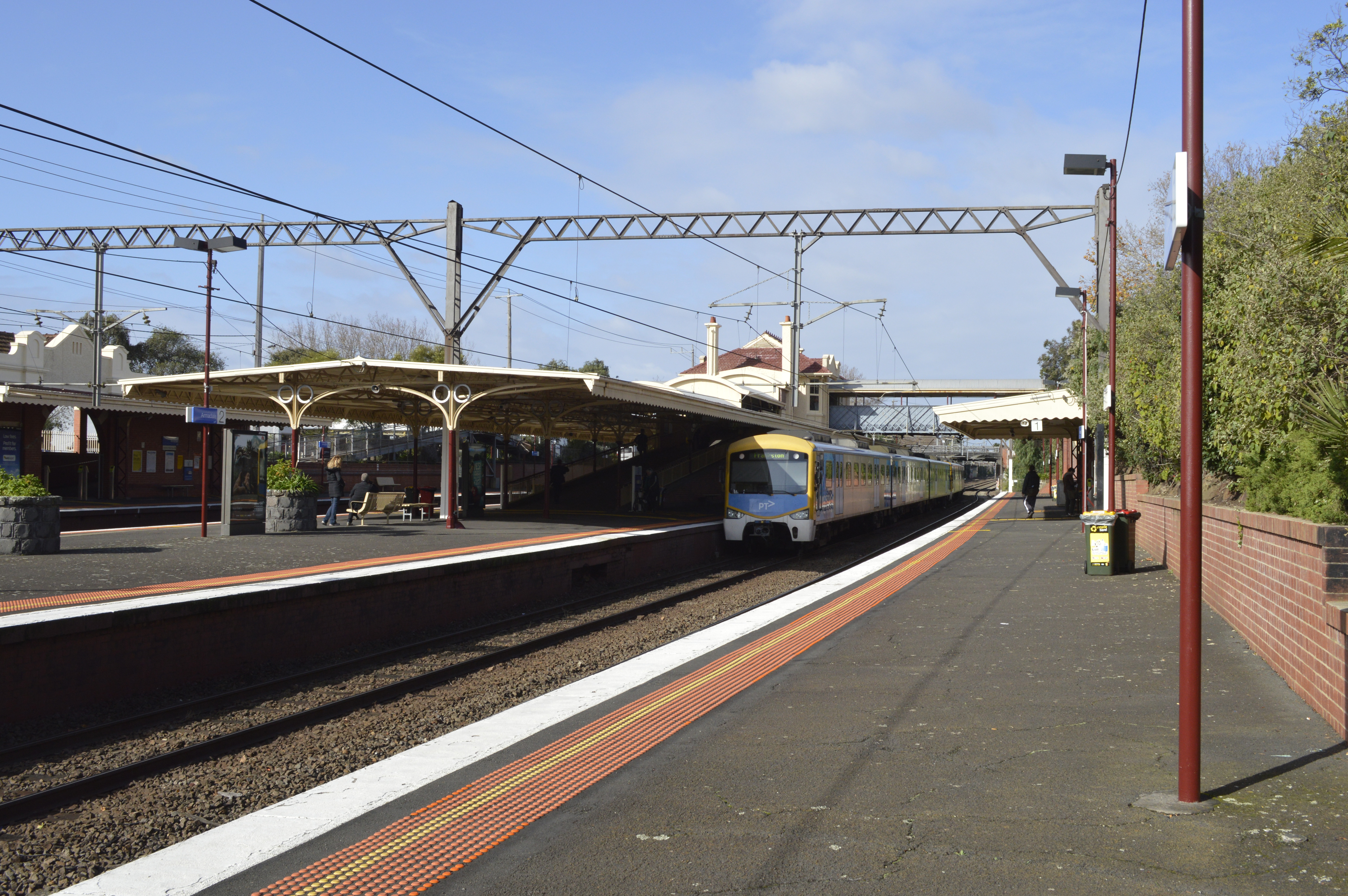
Eastbound view from Platform 1, with a Siemens Nexas train departing Platform 2 on a down Frankston service, June 2014

Located next to the station entrance on 14 Cheel Street is a class A2 heritage listed single-storey Edwardian-era shop. This building was previously a general store, however, in 2015 structural problems emerged inside the building forcing the closure of the store and eviction of the tenants. The structure has been reinforced due to the inability to demolish the building, due to its "high local significance that act as an important milestone in the development of the region or the municipality, and that it may illustrate one or more of the key local historical themes." In 2022, a permanent fence was installed on the platform replacing the existing temporary fence.

== Platforms and services ==
Armadale has two side platforms and one island platform with four faces. The station is currently served by the Frankston line—a service on the metropolitan rail network. The Frankston line runs from Frankston station south east of Melbourne, joining the Cranbourne and Pakenham lines at Caulfield station before continuing to Flinders Street station via the City Loop. Despite the Pakenham and Cranbourne lines operating through the station, these services no longer stop at the station due to low station patronage, instead running express through the station.

Armadale platform arrangement
Platform	Line	Destination	Via	Service Type	Notes	Source
1	Frankston line	Flinders Street	City Loop	All stations		
2	Frankston line	Cheltenham, Carrum or Frankston		All stations	Services to Cheltenham and Carrum only operate during weekday peaks.	
3	No scheduled services				No services stop at this platform. Cranbourne and Pakenham line services run express through this platform.	
4	No scheduled services				No services stop at this platform. Cranbourne and Pakenham line services run express through this platform.	

== Transport links ==
Armadale station has one tram and one bus connection.

Yarra Trams operates one route via Armadale station:

- : Moreland – Glen Iris

CDC Melbourne operates one bus route via Armadale station:

- 605 : Gardenvale – City (Queen Victoria Market)
