= Malvern Central =

- Location: Malvern, Victoria, Australia
- Coordinates: 37°51′46.8″S 145°01′38.1″E
- Address: 110-122 Wattletree Road, Malvern
- Opened: 27 July 1987
- Manager: GPT Group
- Owner: UniSuper
- Num. of stores: ~50
- Num. of anchor tenants: 2
- Floors: 2 + 2 parking
- Parking: 690
- Public transit: Malvern railway station, Route 5, Route 16
- Website: www.malverncentralshopping.com.au

Malvern Central is a luxury regional shopping centre located in the Eastern Melbourne suburb of Malvern, Victoria, Australia. The centre, which opened in 1987 includes a food court, two anchor tenants and numerous specialty stores.

== History ==
Malvern Central opened on the 27 July 1987 as a 14,000 square metre Grollo built complex. The complex consisted of Target and Safeway stores, as well as 46 speciality shops. It was renovated and redeveloped in 2013.

== Tenants and amenities ==
Malvern Central comprises about 50 stores with two anchor tenants. Stores include Woolworths (the former Safeway store), David Jones (planned for closure by the end of 2026), BWS, Adairs, Bakers Delight, Boost Juice, Decjuba, Laser Clinics Australia, Peter Bouchier, Roll'd, Seed, Telstra and The Athlete's Foot.

== Location ==
Malvern Central is located near Malvern railway station. Services from this station include the Crabourne, Pakenham, and Frankston lines. Tram Route 5 tram service operates in front of the centre on Wattletree Road, and Route 16 operates on nearby Glenferrie Road.

In June 2022, Evie installed two electric vehicle charging spaces in the basement carpark of Malvern Central.
