= South Yarra railway station =

Railway station in Melbourne, Australia

South Yarra
- Southbound view from Platform 1, November 2026

General information
- Location: Toorak Road, South Yarra, Victoria 3141; City of Stonnington; Australia
- Coordinates: 37°50′20″S 144°59′32″E
- System: PTV commuter rail station
- Owner: VicTrack
- Operator: Metro Trains
- Lines: Frankston; Sandringham
- Distance: 5.41 kilometres from Southern Cross
- Platforms: 6 (2 side, 2 island)
- Tracks: 6
- Connections: Tram

Construction
- Structure type: Ground
- Accessible: No—steep ramp

Other information
- Status: Operational, premium station
- Station code: SYR
- Fare zone: Myki zone 1
- Website: Public Transport Victoria

History
- Opened: 22 December 1860; 165 years ago
- Electrified: May 1919 (1500 V DC overhead)
- Former names: Gardiner's Creek Road (1860–1866)

Passengers
- 2019–2020: 3,151,600 ▼27.83%
- 2020–2021: 1,669,900 ▼47.01%
- 2021–2022: 1,997,050 ▲19.59%
- 2022–2023: 2,769,550 ▲38.68%
- 2023–2024: 3,100,250 ▲11.94%

Services
Preceding station	Metro Trains	Following station
Richmond towards Flinders Street via City Loop	Frankston line	Hawksburn towards Frankston
Richmond towards Flinders Street via City Loop	Frankston line Weekday peak express services	Malvern One-way operation
Richmond One-way operation	Frankston line Weekday peak express services	Caulfield towards Frankston
Richmond towards Laverton, Werribee or Williamstown via Flinders Street	Sandringham line	Prahran towards Sandringham
Former services
Preceding station	Metro Trains	Following station
Richmond towards Flinders Street via City Loop	Pakenham line	Malvern towards East Pakenham or Cranbourne
Richmond towards Flinders Street	Cranbourne line	Malvern towards East Pakenham or Cranbourne
Track layout
Location

South Yarra station is a railway station operated by Metro Trains Melbourne on the Frankston and Sandringham lines, part of the Melbourne rail network. It serves the southern Melbourne suburb of South Yarra in Victoria, Australia.

South Yarra is a ground-level premium station featuring six platforms, with two island platforms and two side platforms accessible by an overground concourse. It opened on 22 December 1860.

== History ==
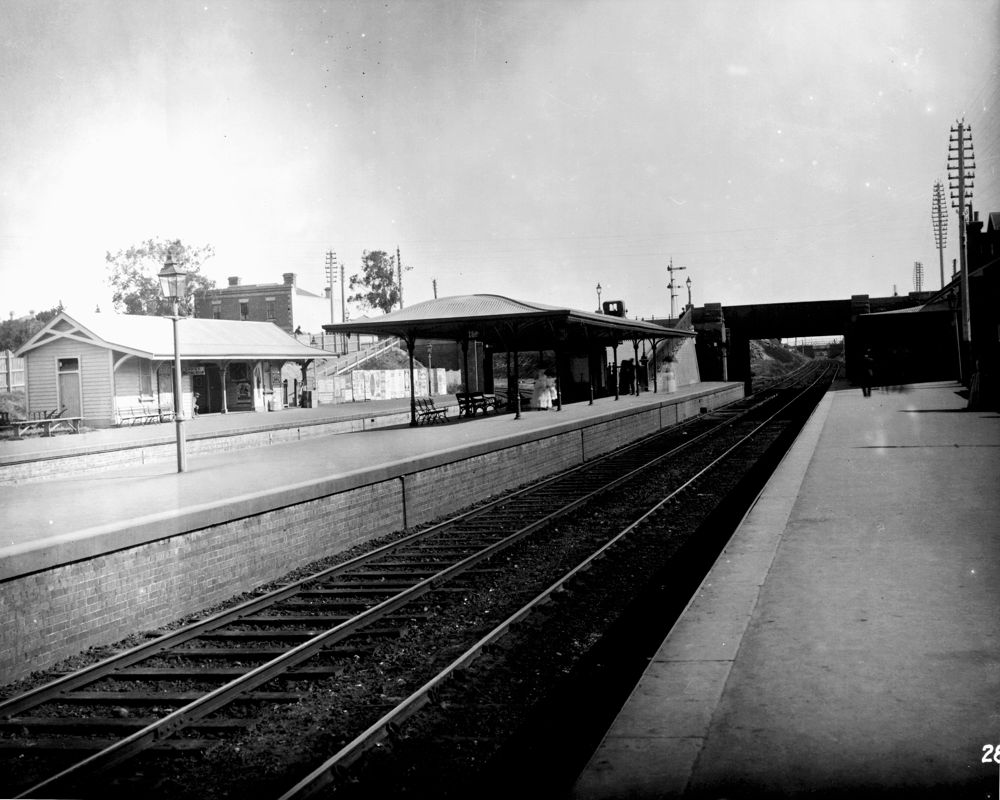
Southbound view from Platform 4, 1900

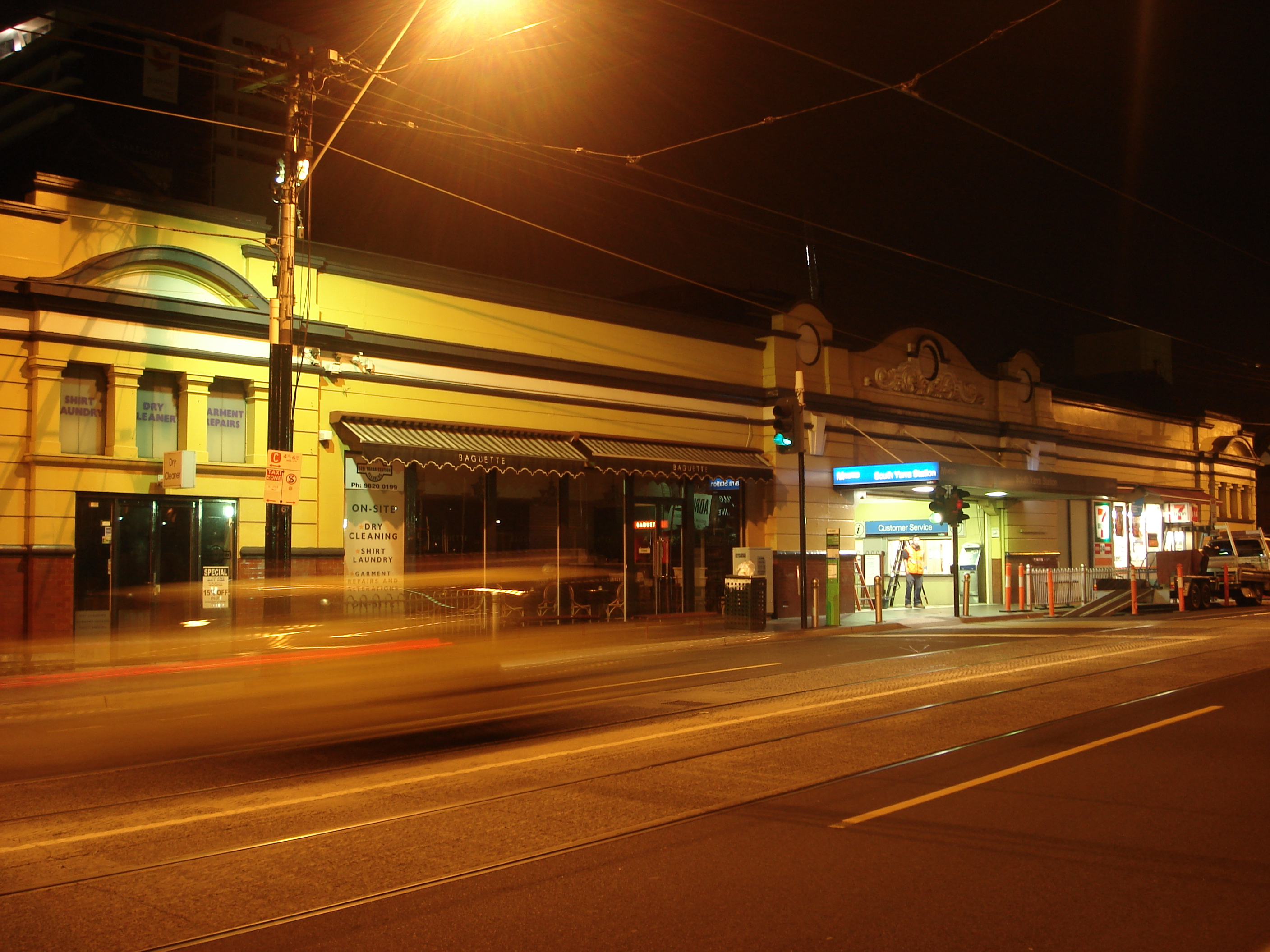
Station facade and entrance at night, May 2011

South Yarra station was opened by the Melbourne and Suburban Railway Company as Gardiners Creek Road. Initially, it served the Brighton line, on what was called the "Prahran Branch". On 1 January 1867, the station was renamed South Yarra. The private railway company, by then the Melbourne and Hobson's Bay United Railway Company, was taken over by the Government of Victoria in 1878, and its network became part of the Victorian Railways.

In 1924, historian John Cooper noted that when the South Yarra to Oakleigh line was first constructed, a set of points connected the line to the existing Brighton line. However, a high embankment obscured the vision of train drivers approaching South Yarra on both lines. To solve that problem, it was decided that the Oakleigh line should have its own tracks into Melbourne, and the Cremorne Railway Bridge, spanning the Yarra River, was duplicated to allow that.

The opening of the South Yarra to Oakleigh line in 1879 made the proposed Outer Circle line largely redundant, but it was constructed anyway, a decade later.

In 1914, the line between South Yarra and Caulfield was completely rebuilt. The works included the quadruplication of the line, and the reconstruction of the stations at Hawksburn, Toorak, Armadale and Malvern.

In 1946, the current Cremorne Railway Bridge over the Yarra River was opened, replacing the earlier one. In 1947, a works siding opened, which was disconnected in 1955.

Even after the laying of six tracks from Richmond to South Yarra, and the abolition of the signal box, the station retained three emergency crossovers at the up end of Platforms 1 and 2, 3 and 4 and 5 and 6. The latter set was removed in 1983, followed by the middle pair by 23 June 1984, and the final set in August 1986. The crossovers were originally provided in 1945 and 1960. Also in 1960, the "local lines", used by Pakenham and Cranbourne line services, were extended to Richmond, and the signal box, located at the up end of Platforms 4 and 5, was closed, but still remains in place.

In 1993, there were major re-signalling works between South Yarra and Toorak, with similar works occurring between South Yarra and Richmond in 1994. In 1997, South Yarra was upgraded to a premium station. As such, the station is staffed from the first to the last service each day.

According to Public Transport Victoria data, South Yarra is the eighth-busiest station on the Melbourne metropolitan network, with 4.59 million boardings per year during the 2017/2018 financial year.

In early 2020, it was announced that South Yarra was to undergo a $12 million refurbishment. The entrance to the station on Toorak Road was to be widened, and the layout changed to make the station larger.

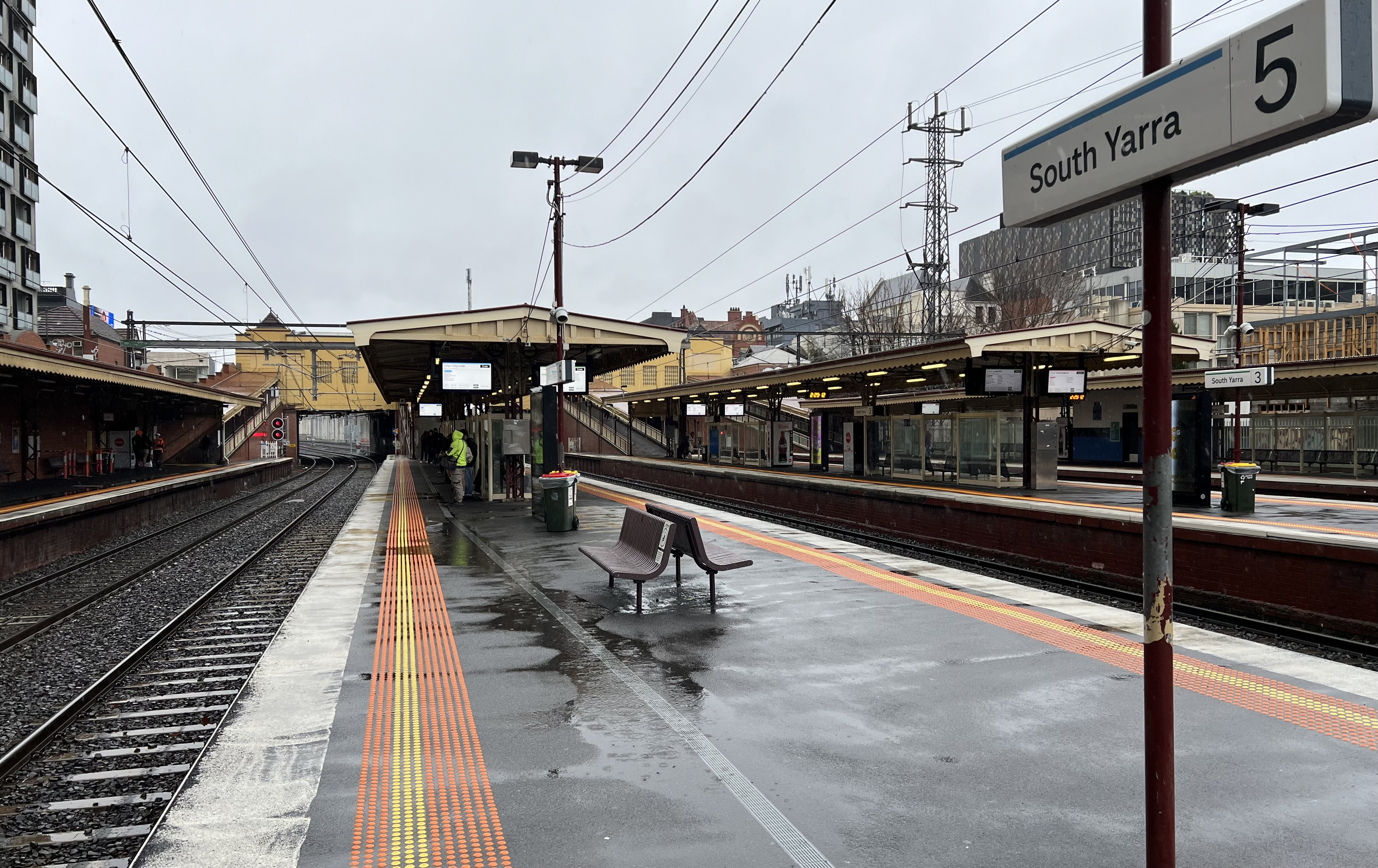
Cranbourne and Pakenham lines used South Yarra station, specifically Platforms 5 and 6, prior to the full opening of the Metro Tunnel in February 2026.

Services on the Pakenham and Cranbourne lines no longer stopped at South Yarra after the Metro Tunnel was fully operational on 1 February 2026. The entrance portal to the Metro Tunnel is located near the station, but South Yarra was not integrated into the new tunnel, which generated some criticism.

== Platforms and services ==
South Yarra station has six platforms: two side platforms and two island platforms with four faces. It is served by Frankston and Sandringham line trains. V/Line's Bairnsdale rail services (Gippsland line) pass non-stop through the station.

South Yarra platform arrangement
Platform	Line	Destination	Via	Service Type	Notes	Source
1	Sandringham line	Laverton, Werribee or Williamstown	Flinders Street	All stations	Services to Laverton and Williamstown only operate on weekdays.	
2	Sandringham line	Sandringham		All stations		
3	Frankston line	Flinders Street	City Loop	All stations		
4	Frankston line	Cheltenham, Mordialloc, Carrum or Frankston		All stations and limited express services	Services to Cheltenham, Mordialloc and Carrum only operate during weekday peaks.	
5	No Scheduled Services					
6	No Scheduled Services					

== Usage ==
A chart showing passenger usage at South Yarra Railway Station in Melbourne, Australia, between 2008 and 2024 sorted by financial year.

South Yarra is the eighth-busiest station on Melbourne's metropolitan rail network.

== Transport links ==
Yarra Trams operates one route via South Yarra station:

- : West Coburg – Toorak
