= Hawksburn railway station =

Railway station in Melbourne, Australia

Hawksburn
- Eastbound view from Platform 1, July 2026

General information
- Location: Luxton Road, South Yarra, Victoria 3141; City of Stonnington; Australia
- Coordinates: 37°50′41″S 145°00′08″E
- System: PTV commuter rail station
- Owner: VicTrack
- Operator: Metro Trains
- Line: Frankston
- Distance: 6.63 kilometres from Southern Cross
- Platforms: 4 (2 side, 1 island)
- Tracks: 4

Construction
- Structure type: Below-grade
- Accessible: No—steep ramp

Other information
- Status: Operational, unstaffed
- Station code: HKN
- Fare zone: Myki zone 1
- Website: Public Transport Victoria

History
- Opened: 7 May 1879; 147 years ago
- Rebuilt: 1914
- Electrified: March 1922 (1500 V DC overhead)

Passengers
- 2017–2018: 555,477
- 2018–2019: 507,600 ▼8.62%
- 2019–2020: 369,550 ▼27.2%
- 2020–2021: 201,400 ▼45.5%
- 2021–2022: 231,600 ▲14.99%
- 2022–2023: 340,500 ▲47.02%
- 2023–2024: 378,250 ▲11.09%
- 2024–2025: 447,000 ▲18.18%

Services
Preceding station	Metro Trains	Following station
South Yarra towards Flinders Street via City Loop	Frankston line	Toorak towards Frankston
Pakenham line does not stop here
Cranbourne line does not stop here
Former services
Preceding station	Metro Trains	Following station
South Yarra towards Flinders Street	Pakenham line	Toorak towards Pakenham or Cranbourne
South Yarra towards Flinders Street	Cranbourne line	Toorak towards Pakenham or Cranbourne
Track layout
Location

Hawksburn station is a railway station operated by Metro Trains Melbourne on the Frankston line, part of the Melbourne rail network. It serves the southern Melbourne suburb of South Yarra in Victoria, Australia. Hawksburn is a below ground unstaffed station, featuring four platforms with an island platform and two side platforms accessible by a pedestrian bridge. The station is listed on the Victorian Heritage Register, and was opened on 7 May 1879.

The stations' namesake is the locality of Hawksburn, situated 600 metres from the station. The station is only partially accessible due to multiple steep access ramps.

There are two principal station buildings, one of which is located on the stations central island platform (platforms 2 and 3) consisting of a small two-story brick building, whilst the other is a one-story brick structure situated on platform 4. These buildings were provided for the station in 1914, as ticketing and staff offices.

Although Cranbourne and Pakenham lines do run through the station, these services are express and do not stop. The journey to Flinders Street station is approximately 5.3 kilometres (3.29 mi) and takes 9 minutes.

== Description ==
Hawksburn railway station is located in the suburb of South Yarra, a suburb of Melbourne, Victoria. The station is located nearby to the Hawksburn shopping precinct and the Prahran Housing Commission Estate. The station is owned by VicTrack, a state government agency, and the station is operated by Metro Trains. The station is approximately 5.3 kilometres (3.29 mi), or an 9-minute train journey, from Flinders Street station. The adjacent stations are South Yarra station up towards Melbourne, and Toorak station down towards Frankston.

The station consists of a single island platform and two side platforms with a total of four platform edges. Standard in Melbourne, the platform has an asphalt surface with concrete on the edges. The platforms are approximately 160 metres (524 ft 11 in) long, enough for a Metro Trains 7 car HCMT. The station features a pedestrian bridge, accessed from the centre of the platforms by a ramp. The station features two principal station buildings, both former ticketing offices which are now heritage listed staff facilities. Distinct Edwardian architectural features of the red brick station buildings include ornate parapets, cement banding, tall chimneys with terracotta pots, tiled hip roof with terracotta finials, and stucco walls.

The station building, platform, and overpass are largely the same as when originally built, with the main change being updated signage, technology, and the addition of one new platform canopy amongst other minor building and platform upgrades. There is no car parking available at the station. The station is listed as an "assisted access" station on the Metro Trains website, as the access ramp is too steep and would require assistance for wheelchair customers to traverse.

== History ==
Hawksburn railway station was opened on 7 May 1879 with the station consisting of a single platform and track for commuter and freight service. Like the locality itself, the station was named after Hawksburn Estate, where the station is located. The first station buildings were opened on the site between 1881 and 1883 to coincide with the duplication of track between the city and Oakleigh. The current station was constructed in 1914 to provide improved and additional facilities to what had become an increasingly busy and important location on the train network. The station rebuild was part of level crossing removal works that removed all level crossings, rebuilt all stations, and quadruplicated the corridor between South Yarra and Caulfield by 1914. Later in 1922, the line was electrified using 1500 V DC overhead wires with three position signalling also introduced.

The station has mostly stayed the same since 1914, with only minor upgrades taking place. In 1972, the island platform (Platforms 2 and 3) was extended at both ends. In 1993, major re-signalling works occurred between South Yarra and Toorak stations. The station underwent minor upgrades with the installation of one new shelter on Platform 1 in the 2010s. In 2021, resignalling works occurred to upgrade the corridor to high-capacity signalling as part of the Metro Tunnel project.

== Platforms and services ==
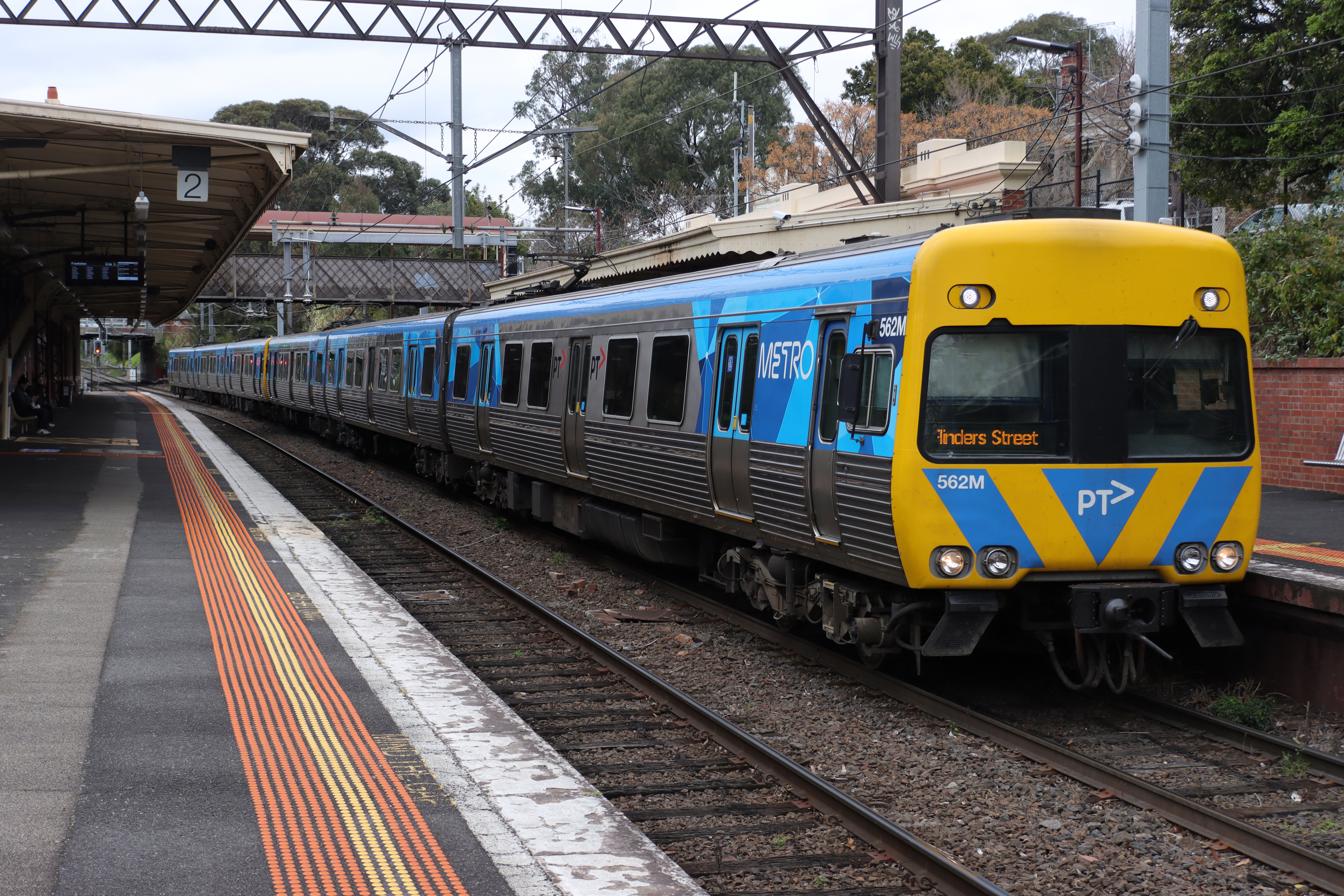
A Comeng train on a Flinders Street-bound service arrives at Platform 1, August 2023

Hawksburn has two side platforms and one island platform with four faces. The station is currently served by the Frankston line—a service on the metropolitan rail network. The Frankston line runs from Frankston station southeast of Melbourne, joining the Cranbourne and Pakenham lines at Caulfield station before continuing onto Flinders Street station via the City Loop. Despite the Pakenham and Cranbourne lines operating through the station, these services no longer stop at the station due to low station patronage, instead running express through the station. However Pakenham and Cranbourne trains used to be the only trains that stopped here during off peak.

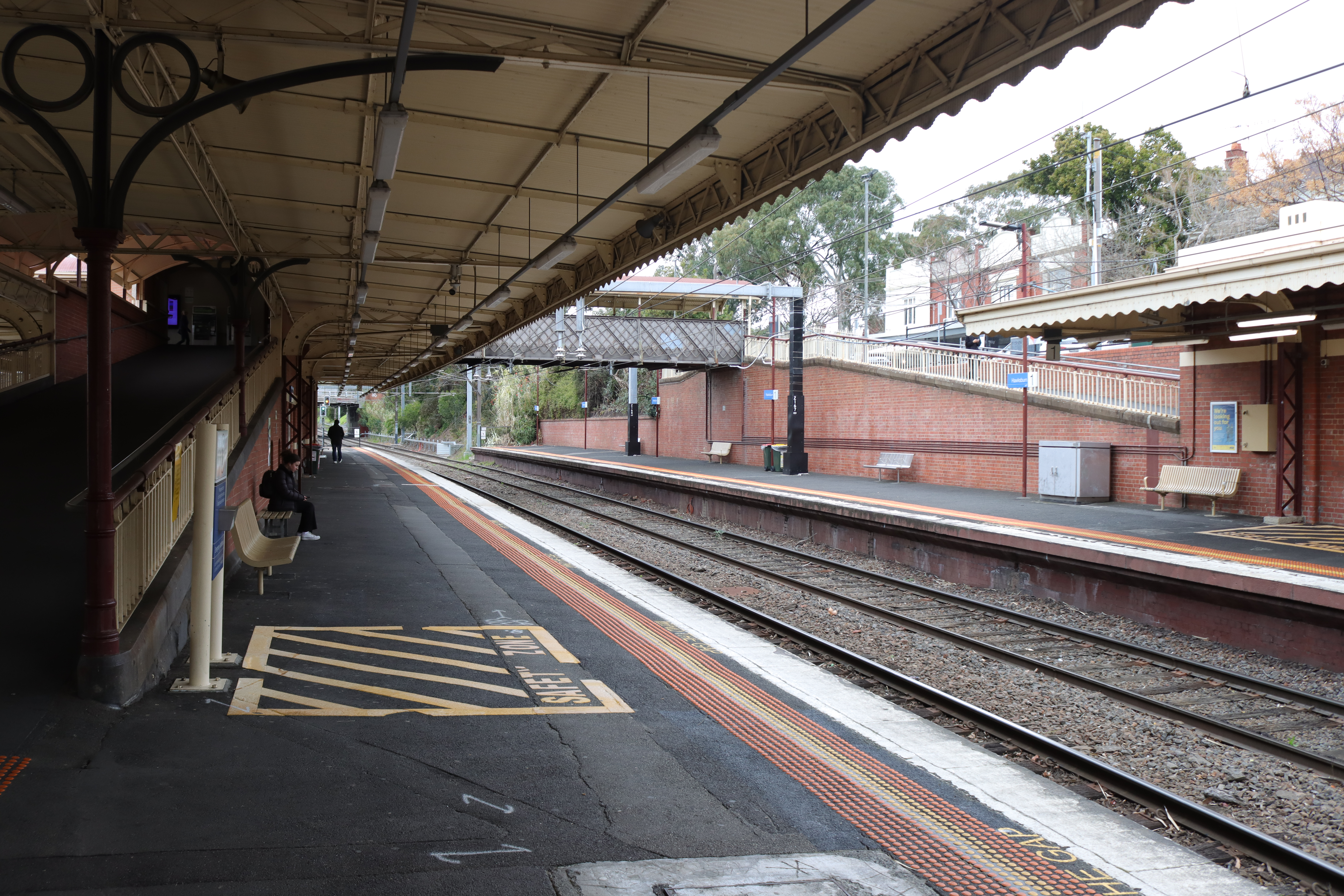
Platforms 1 and 2, which are used for Frankston line services

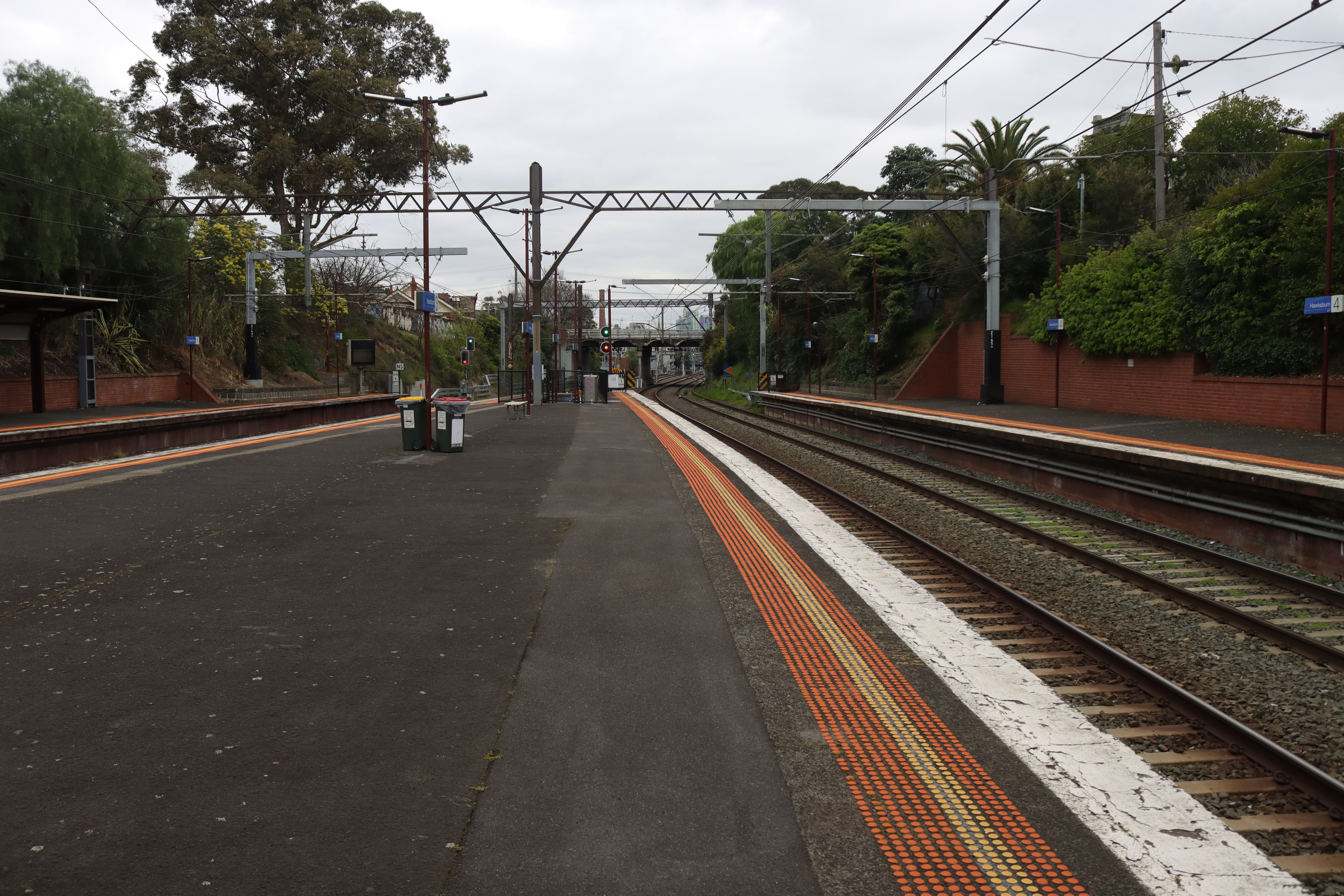
Platforms 3 and 4, no services stop at these platforms, but the Gippsland, Pakenham and Cranbourne lines do pass these platforms

=== Current ===
Hawksburn platform arrangement
Platform	Line	Destination	Via	Service Type	Notes	Source
1	Frankston line	Flinders Street	City Loop	All stations		
2	Frankston line	Cheltenham, Mordialloc, Carrum, Frankston		All stations	Services to Cheltenham, Mordialloc and Carrum only operate during weekday peaks.	
3	No scheduled services				Services on the Cranbourne and Pakenham line will only stop here if the Frankston line is disrupted. Normally, these lines will run express through this platform.	
4	No scheduled services				Services on the Cranbourne and Pakenham line will only stop here if the Frankston line is disrupted. Normally, these lines will run express through this platform.	

== Transport links ==
Kinetic Melbourne operates one route via Hawksburn station, under contract to Public Transport Victoria:

- 603 : Brighton Beach station – Burnley station

== Gallery ==
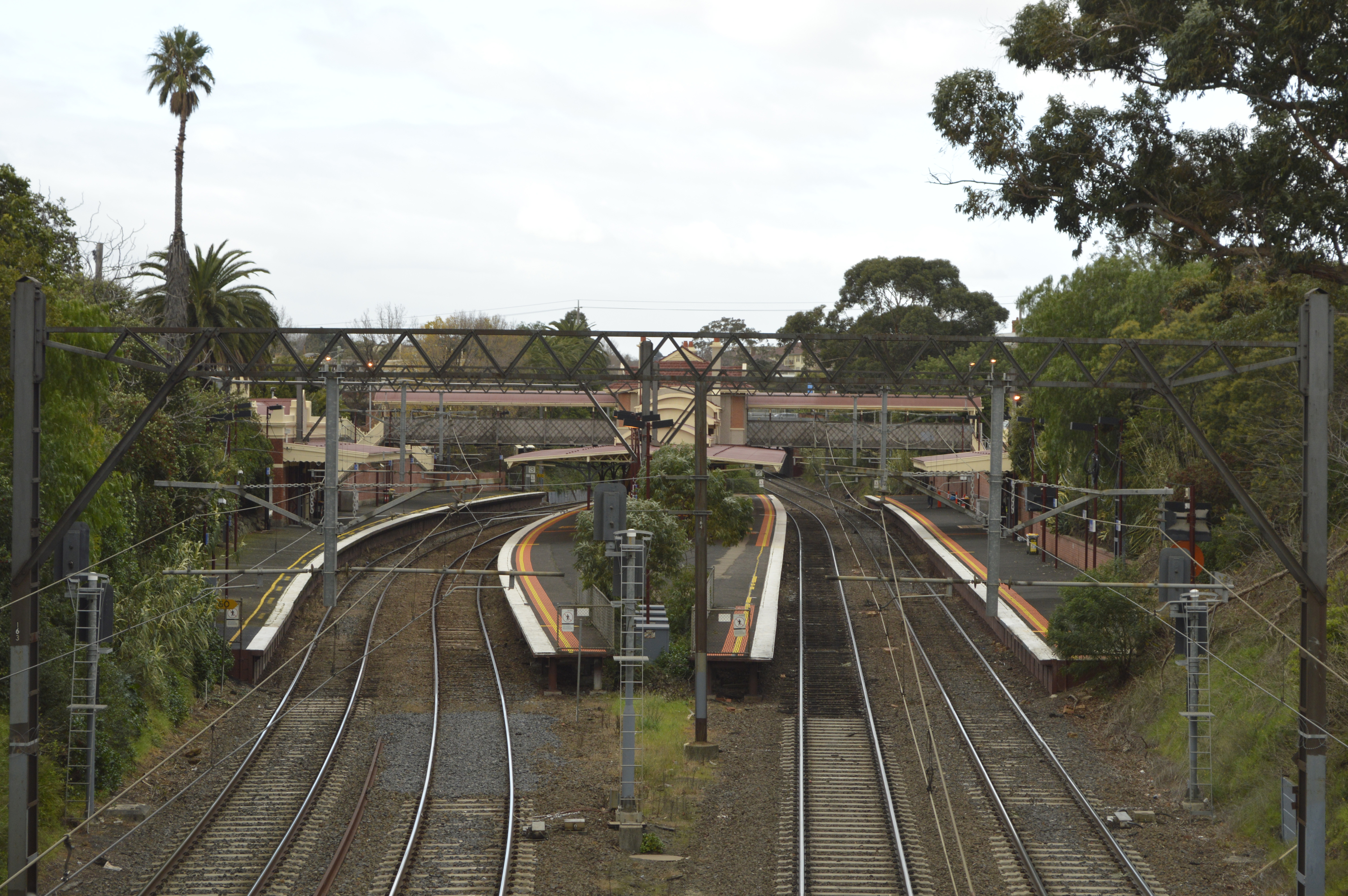
North-west view of all four platforms, taken from Williams Road, June 2014

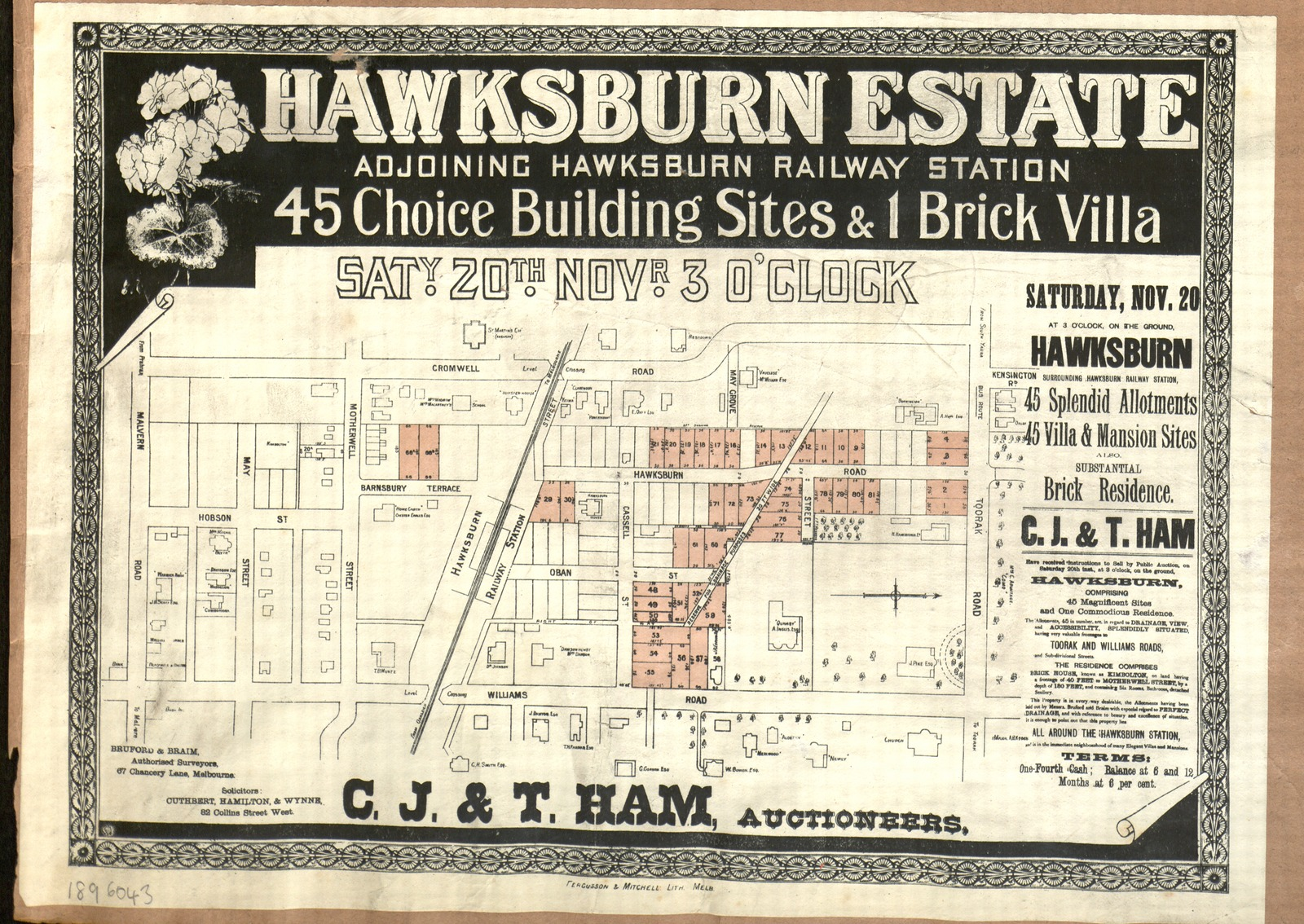
A map of the Hawksburn Estate building sites from 1886.

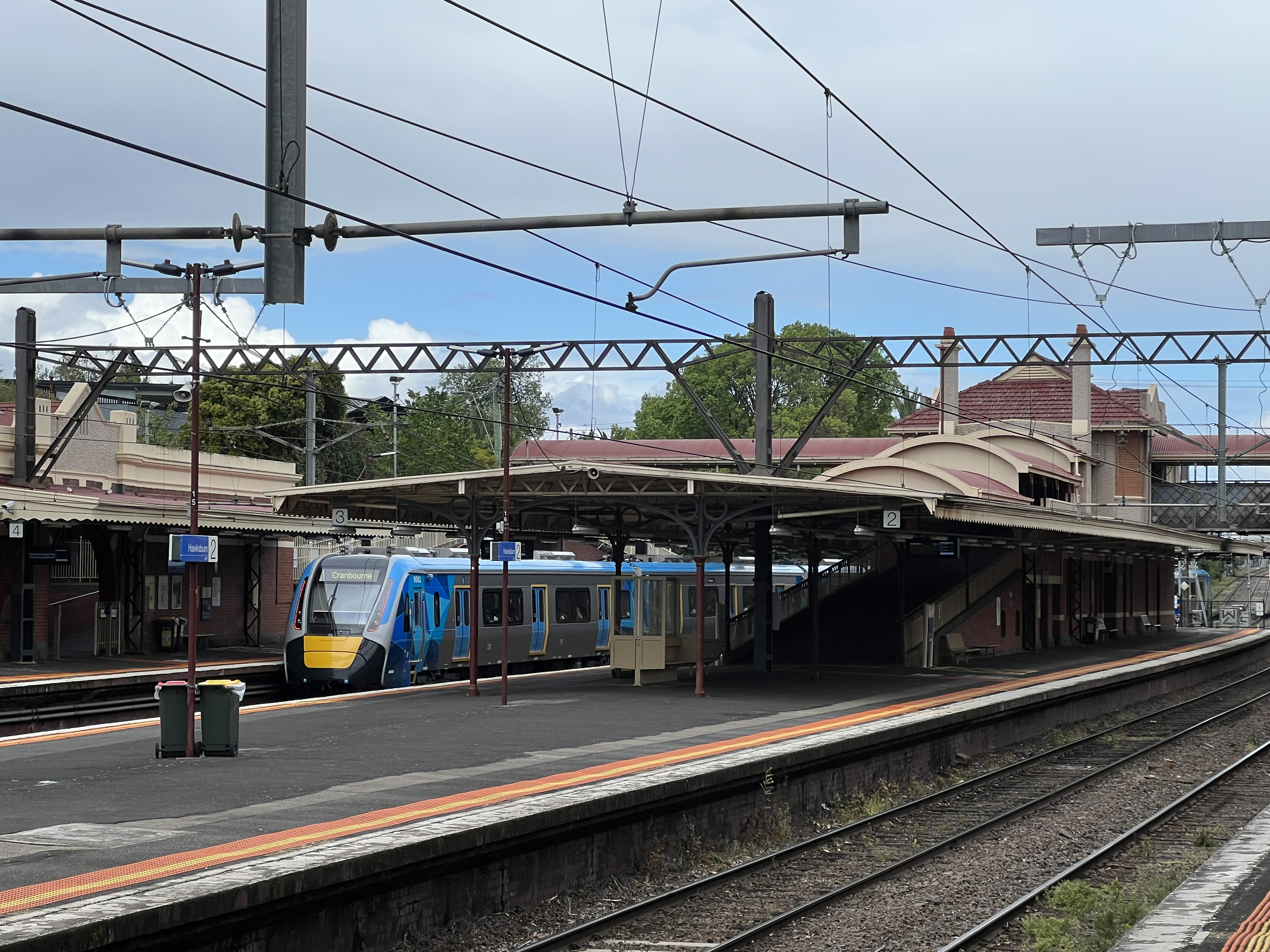
The detail of the distinct Edwardian architectural features on shelters and buildings at Platforms 2, 3 and 4 and a High Capacity Metro Train passing Platform 4

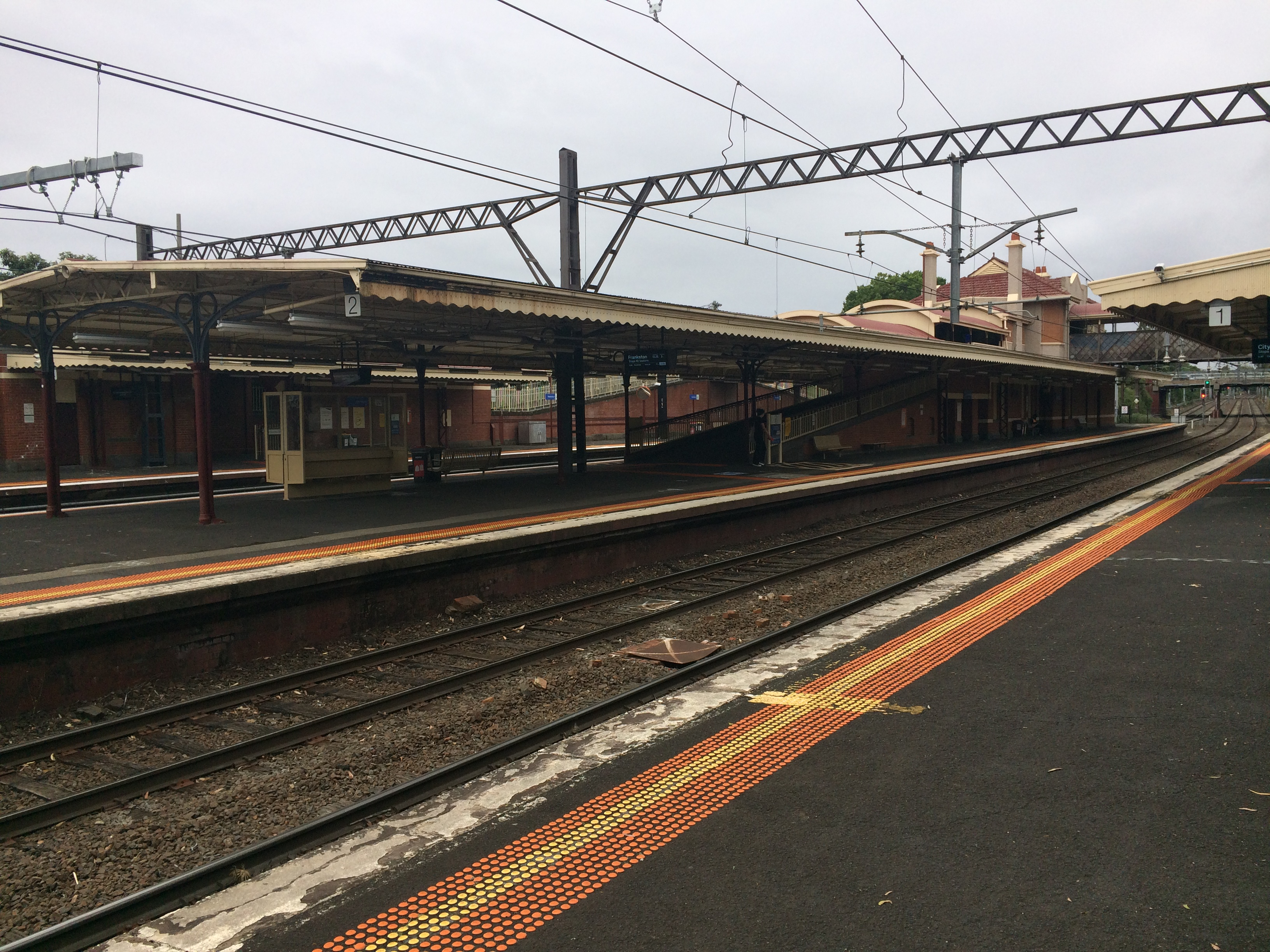
The detail of the heritage shelters on Platforms 2 and 3
