= Toorak railway station =

Railway station in Melbourne, Australia

Toorak
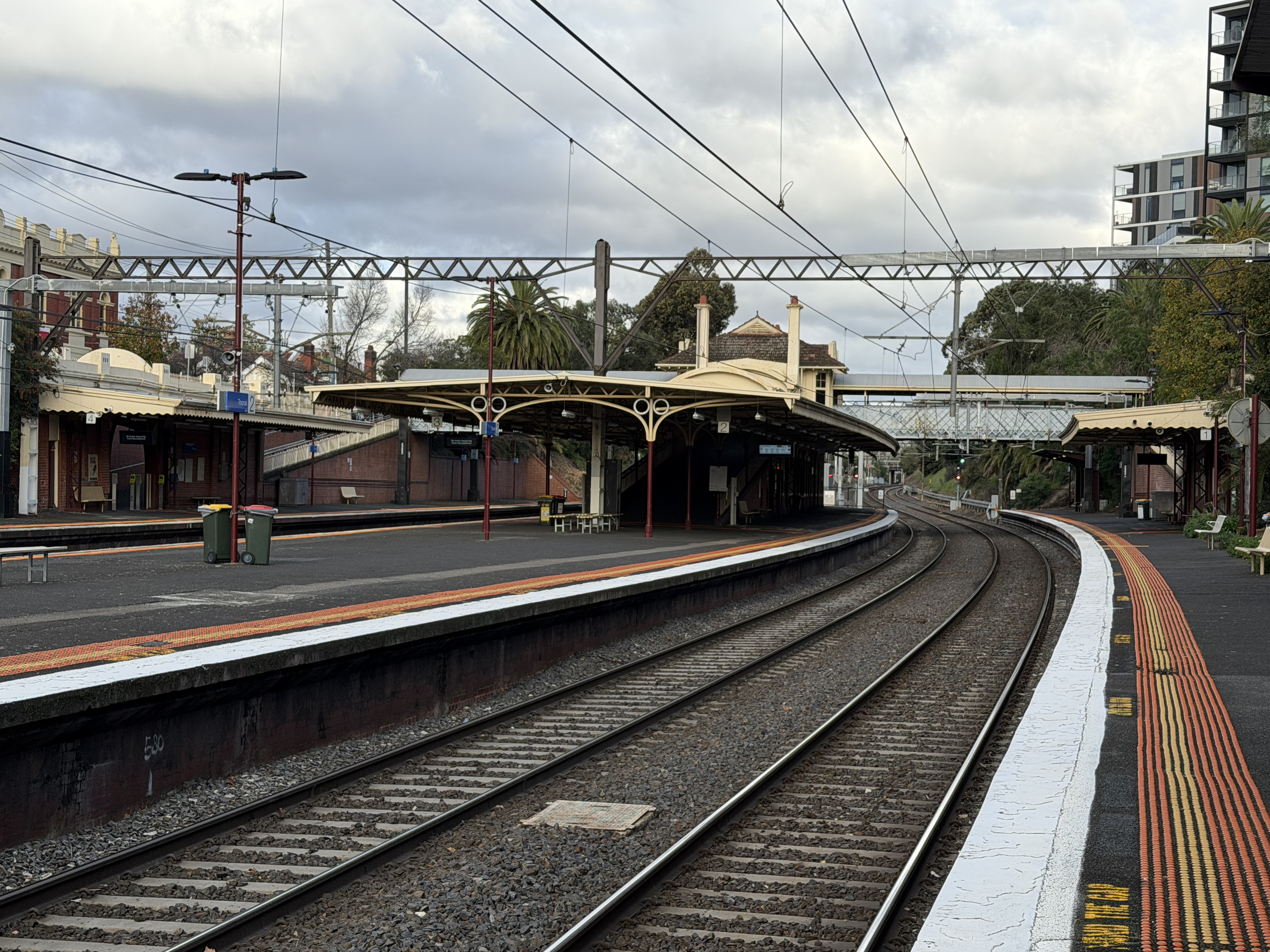
- Southbound view from Platform 1 in June 2026

General information
- Location: Beatty Avenue, Armadale, Victoria 3143; City of Stonnington; Australia
- Coordinates: 37°51′04″S 145°00′50″E
- System: PTV commuter rail station
- Owner: VicTrack
- Operator: Metro Trains
- Line: Frankston
- Distance: 7.91 kilometres from Southern Cross
- Platforms: 4 (2 side, 1 island)
- Tracks: 4
- Connections: Tram; Bus

Construction
- Structure type: Below-grade
- Accessible: No—steep ramp

Other information
- Status: Operational, unstaffed
- Station code: TOR
- Fare zone: Myki zone 1
- Website: Public Transport Victoria

History
- Opened: May 7, 1879; 147 years ago
- Rebuilt: 1914
- Electrified: March 1922 (1500 V DC overhead)

Passengers
- 2017–2018: 554,692
- 2018–2019: 514,950 ▼7.16%
- 2019–2020: 370,450 ▼28.06%
- 2020–2021: 196,650 ▼46.9%
- 2021–2022: 224,850 ▲14.34%

Services
Preceding station	Metro Trains	Following station
Hawksburn towards Flinders Street via City Loop	Frankston line	Armadale towards Frankston
Pakenham line does not stop here
Cranbourne line does not stop here
Former services
Preceding station	Metro Trains	Following station
Hawksburn towards Flinders Street	Pakenham line	Armadale towards Pakenham or Cranbourne
Hawksburn towards Flinders Street	Cranbourne line	Armadale towards Pakenham or Cranbourne
Track layout
Location

Toorak station is a railway station operated by Metro Trains Melbourne on the Frankston line, part of the Melbourne rail network. It serves the north of Armadale, a suburb of Melbourne, Victoria, Australia. The station is named after the nearby suburb of Toorak, which is located north of the station.

The station is listed on the Victorian Heritage Register, and was opened on 7 May 1879. The station consists of an island platform and two side platforms all accessed by a pedestrian bridge. There are two principal station buildings located on the central platform (platforms 2 and 3) and on platform 4, consisting of a small two and one-story brick buildings. These buildings were provided in 1914, as ticketing and staff offices. The station is only partially accessible due to a multiple steep access ramps.

The station connects to the Route 72 tram service and the route 604 and 605 bus services. The journey to Flinders Street railway station is approximately 6.5 kilometres (4.04 mi) and takes 11 minutes.

== Description ==
Toorak railway station is on the boundary of Armadale, Toorak, and Prahran suburbs of Melbourne, Victoria. The station is located nearby to the Beatty Avenue shopping precinct, Orrong Romanis Reserve, and Toorak Park. The station is owned by VicTrack, a state government agency, and the station is operated by Metro Trains. The station is approximately 6.5 kilometres (4.04 mi), or an 11-minute train journey, from Flinders Street station. The adjacent stations are Hawksburn station up towards Melbourne, and Armadale station down towards Frankston.

The station consists of a single island platform and two side platforms with a total of four platform edges. Standard in Melbourne, the platform has an asphalt surface with concrete on the edges. The platforms are approximately 160 metres (524.93 ft) long, enough for a Metro Trains 7 car HCMT. The station features a pedestrian bridge, accessed from the centre of the platforms by a ramp. The station features two principal station buildings, both former ticketing offices which are now heritage listed staff facilities. Distinct Edwardian architectural features of the red brick station buildings include ornate parapets, cement banding, tall chimneys with terracotta pots, tiled hip roof with terracotta finials, and stucco walls.

The station building, platform, and overpass are largely the same as when originally built, with the main change being updated signage, technology, and the addition of two new platform canopy amongst other minor building and platform upgrades. There is no car parking available at the station. The station is listed as an "assisted access" station on the Metro Trains website, as the access ramp is too steep and would require assistance for wheelchair customers to traverse.

== History ==
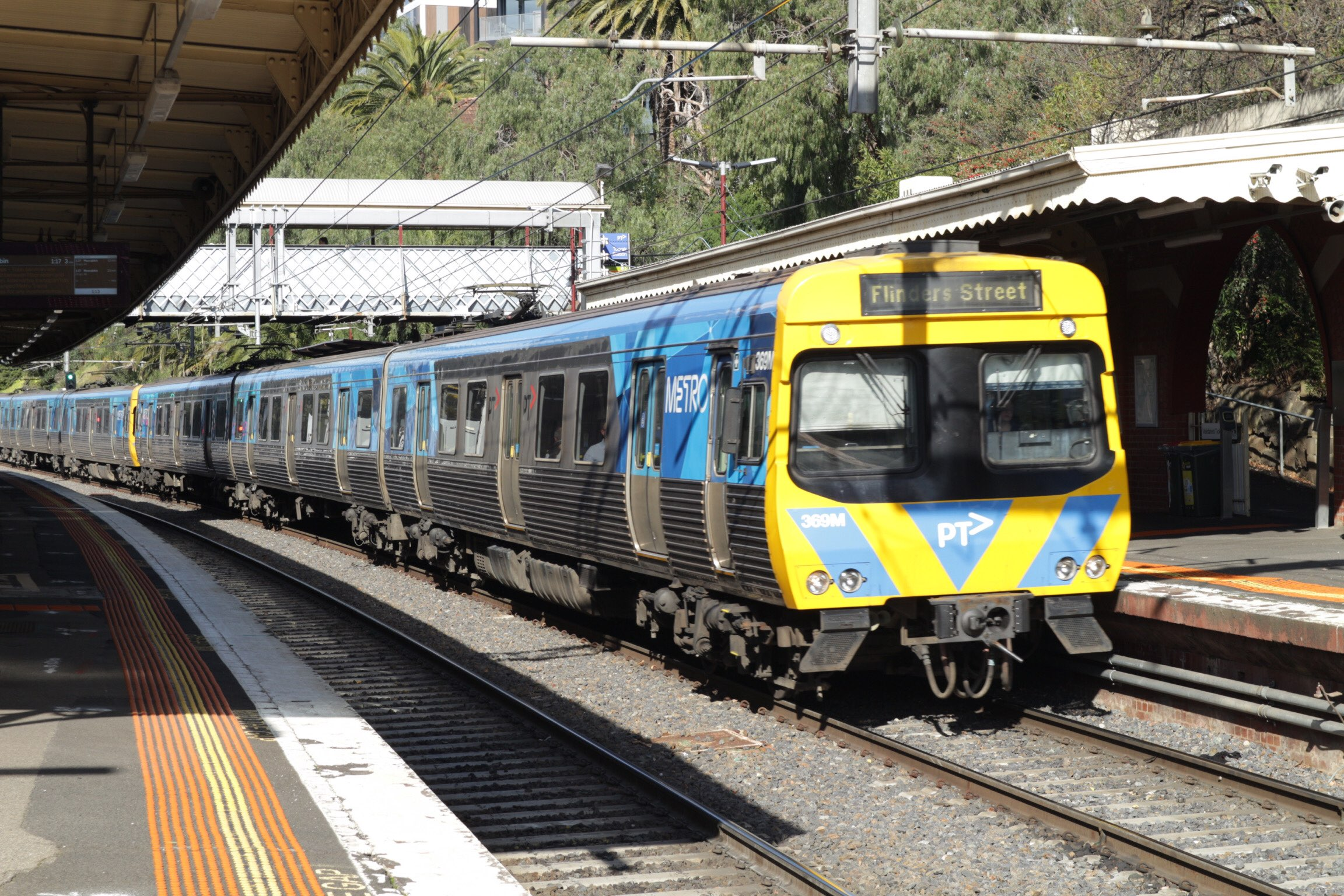
A city-bound Comeng train arriving at Platform 1 in July 2022. This platform was constructed as part of level crossing removal works in 1914.

Toorak railway station was opened on 7 May 1879, with the station consisting of a single platform and track for commuter and freight service. Like the adjacent suburb itself, the station was named after Toorak House, built by merchant James Jackson in 1849. The name is believed to be an Indigenous word meaning 'reedy swamp' or 'black crow'. The first station buildings were opened on the site between 1881 and 1883 to coincide with the duplication of track between the city and Oakleigh. The current station was constructed in 1914 to provide improved and additional facilities to what had become an increasingly busy and important location on the train network. The station rebuild was part of level crossing removal works that removed all level crossings, rebuilt all stations, and quadruplicated the corridor between South Yarra and Caulfield by 1914. Later in 1922, the line was electrified using 1500 V DC overhead wires with three position signalling also introduced.

In 1976, debate regarding the name of the station occurred as the station is located in the nearby suburb of Armadale. Suggestions were made about renaming the station, including naming the station after Albert Jacka, Australia's first recipient of the Victoria Cross, who was mayor of the former St Kilda Council. These calls never eventuated, with Toorak station retaining its name with little conversation regarding its naming taking place since.

The station has mostly stayed the same since 1914, with only minor upgrades taking place. In 1972, the island platform (Platforms 2 and 3) was extended at both ends. In 1977, a former goods siding and associated point work were permanently closed before being removed due to limited use. In 1993, major re-signalling works occurred between South Yarra and Toorak stations, with similar works occurring between Toorak and Caulfield stations in that same year. The station underwent minor upgrades with the installation of two new shelters on Platform 1 in the 2010s. In 2021, resignalling works occurred to upgrade the corridor to high capacity signalling as part of the Metro Tunnel project.

In the mid-2010s, rezoning by Stonnington Council allowed for higher density development next to Toorak station. This allowed for the construction of 446 apartments and 18 townhouses across numerous towers by developer Lendlease. These towers have contributed to an increase in patronage and added density on an otherwise under-utilised site.

== Platforms and services ==
Toorak has two side platforms and one island platform with four faces. The station is currently served by the Frankston line—a service on the metropolitan rail network. The Frankston line runs from Frankston station south east of Melbourne, joining the Cranbourne and Pakenham lines at Caulfield station before continuing onto Flinders Street station via the City Loop. Despite the Pakenham and Cranbourne lines operating through the station, these services no longer stop at the station due to low station patronage, instead running express through the station.

Toorak platform arrangement
Platform	Line	Destination	Via	Service Type	Notes	Source
1	Frankston line	Flinders Street	City Loop	All stations		
2	Frankston line	Cheltenham, Carrum, Frankston		All stations	Services to Cheltenham and Carrum only operate during weekday peaks.	
3	No scheduled services				No services stop at this platform. Cranbourne and Pakenham line services run express through this platform.	
4	No scheduled services				No services stop at this platform. Cranbourne and Pakenham line services run express through this platform.	

== Transport links ==
Toorak station has one tram and two bus connections.

Yarra Trams operates one route via Toorak station:

- : Melbourne University – Camberwell

Kinetic Melbourne operates one bus route via Toorak station:

- 604 : Elsternwick station – Anzac station

CDC Melbourne operates one bus route via Toorak station:

- 605 : Gardenvale – City (Queen Victoria Market)
