= Edith Ingpen =

Australian architect

Edith Ingpen (1909–2006) was an Australian architect who lived and worked in Melbourne in the early to mid-twentieth century, and is noted as one of the few female architects in Victoria before WW2 to have had a solo practice.

== Life ==
Edith Constance Ingpen was born to Emma Louisa and Walter Cecil Ingpen on 24 July 1909 in Armadale, Victoria. Ingpen's father Walter Cecil Ingpen was a middle-class professional and held a position as a legal manager of the Royal Insurance company, 414 Collins St Melbourne when Ingpen was a child. Ingpen was a naturally shy person, which was not helped by a slight deafness and poor sense of smell. She never married, and did not have any children. From a young age, Ingpen wanted to be a painter and artist.

For 1926, Ingpen was enrolled in the Diploma of Architecture course at Melbourne University. The diploma required a practical component in which students were articled at an architecture office. Ingpen articled at the offices of E.J & C.L Ruck. Soon after the university introduced a five-year bachelor's degree, into which Ingpen quickly transferred. The first three years consisted of full time study, with the final two being day time employment and night classes. She continued to work in the office of C.L Ruck during her study, and graduated from the Melbourne University Atelier in 1933. Ingpen was the first woman to receive Bachelor of Architecture degree from Melbourne University.

She died in the United Kingdom in January 2006.

== Career ==
Before fully completing her degree, in 1932 Ingpen began work with Harold Desbrowe-Annear who made her an associate of the practice (Desbrowe Annear & Associates). Annear, suffering from diabetes, died a year later, and Ingpen then decided to set up office for herself, taking a room in the rented office next to her father (allowing them to share costs). At the same time, she had taken on her first commission, a block of flats in East Melbourne, which was built 1933–34. It appears as though Ingpen's business was initially successful, winning many domestic commissions. After a little while in business Ingpen had enough time and money to enroll in the National Gallery of Victoria Art School and began taking classes.

As a young woman in business for herself Ingpen attracted a considerable amount of attention. She was interviewed by journalists and gave a lecture tour for the Country Women's Association among others. In 1936, Ingpen was described by Nora Cooper in the Australian Home Beautiful as "one of the best known women architects practicing solo in Melbourne."

In 1939 Ingpen was elected an associate member of the Royal Victorian Association of Architects.

After the beginning of World War II Ingpen found it more difficult to get commissions, and this in combination with the retirement of her father meant she could not longer afford to keep her office open. Following the closure of her office Ingpen began work with the Victorian Public Works Department (VPWD) on or around 1941.

During her time at the VPWD Ingpen was paid less than her male counterparts. She fought an ongoing battle with the public works board for fair pay. In or about 1965 she was passed over for a promotion for which she had been recommended by the Chief Architect. Ingpen was told that notwithstanding the fact that she was the best and most qualified person for the job, it was inappropriate and beneath the VPWD to hire a woman for the position. At this point, she lost patience with the VPWD and resigned in 1965.

Following her resignation Ingpen retired to England, with the intention of taking up painting. In Bristol she enrolled in the Royal West of England Academy of Art.

== Notable work ==
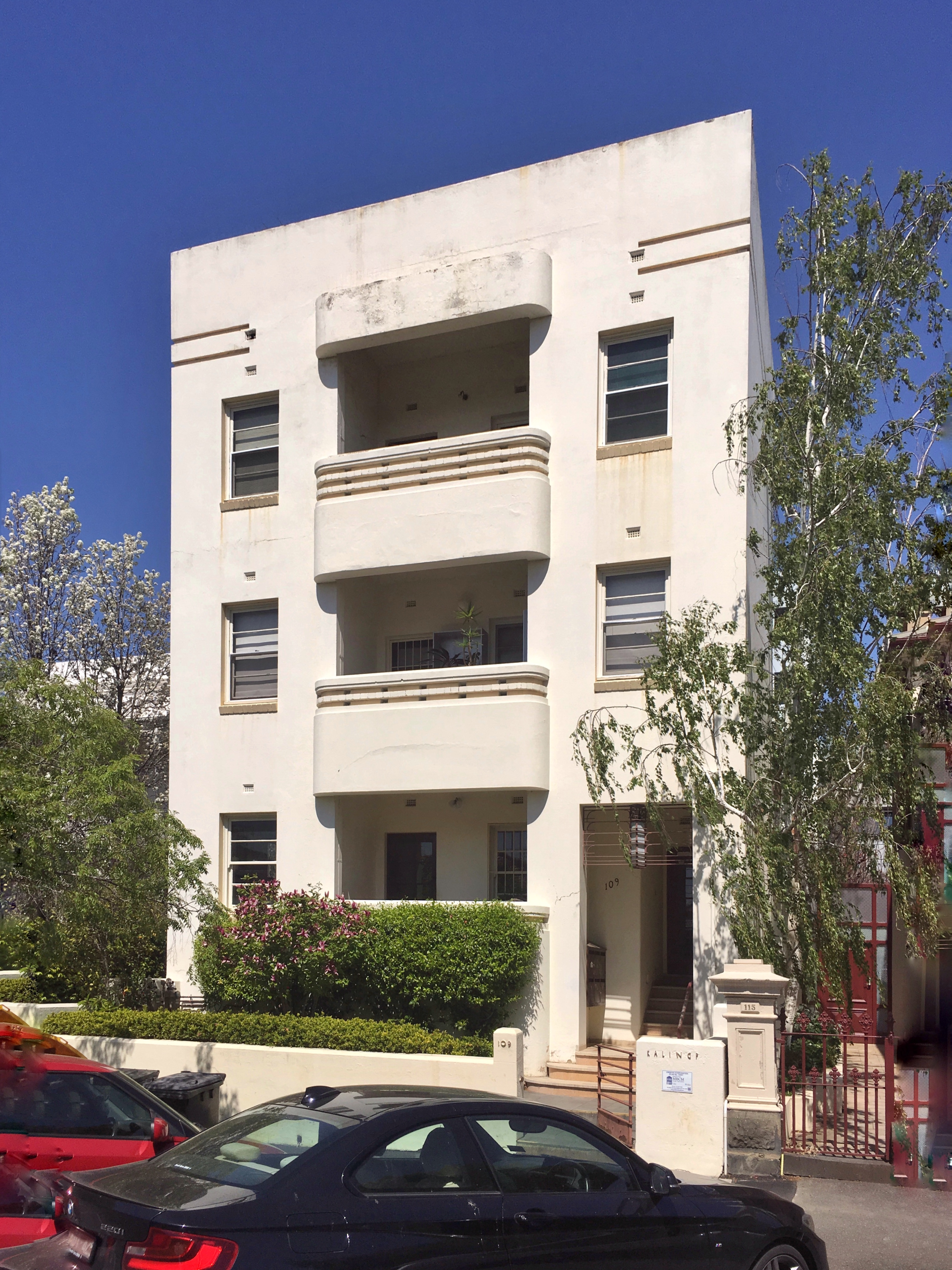
East Melbourne Flats, 1933

Her first commission, a block of flats at 109 George Street, East Melbourne, still stands. Her other commissions included a number of houses around Melbourne (Camberwell, Balwyn, East Melbourne) and country Victoria, including Warrnambool. While Ingpen was studying at the Gallery Art School she met Nina Montford, daughter of English sculptor Paul Raphael Montford. Nina introduced Ingpen to her father who appointed Edith to be his architect for a competition to design for layout and setting of a new statue for the King George V memorial in Canberra . The memorial was not completed until 1953.

In the mid 30s she designed and built a small circular bush cottage near Warragul for herself and her mother. This little cottage was clad with weatherboards, and has exposed framing and roof rafters on the interior walls. It contains a central living space and fireplace, with external rooms fanning out from the centre. The circular form was quite unusual at that time in Australian architecture, though it was made popular by later modernists such as Roy Grounds. The cottage has heritage protection under the Baw Baw Shire planning scheme. The cottage, known as Crossover, was offered for sale in 2023. It had been owned by the same family since the 1960s.

During her time at the VPWD Ingpen worked on a range of diverse of projects. Included were two buildings for the University of Melbourne Engineering School and the conversion of the former Queen Victoria hospital on Williams street into the Peter MacCallum Hospital. She also worked on designs for migrant accommodation and wrote the specifications for the first building to be erected at Monash University.

== Memoria ==
Ingpen Street in the Australian Capital Territory is named after Ingpen.
