= Armadale, Victoria =

Armadale
- Suburb
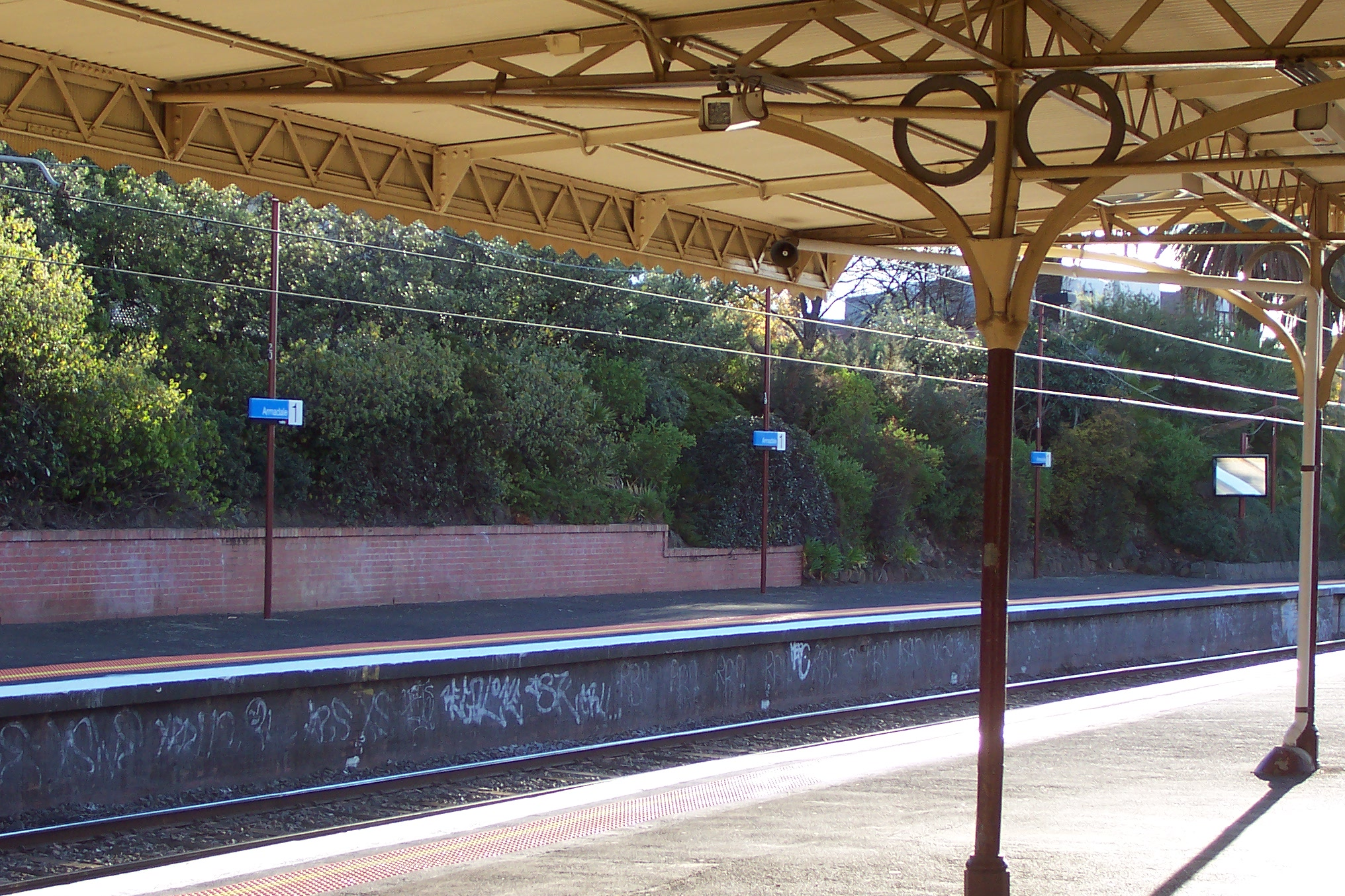
- Armadale railway station

- Interactive map of Armadale
- Coordinates: 37.857°S 145.021°E
- Country: Australia
- State: Victoria
- City: Melbourne
- LGA: City of Stonnington
- Location: 7 km (4.3 mi) from Melbourne

Government
  - State electorates: Malvern; Prahran
  - Federal division: Kooyong

Area
  - Total: 2.2 km^{2} (0.85 sq mi)
- Elevation: 47 m (154 ft)

Population
  - Total: 9,368 (2021 census)
  - Density: 4,260/km^{2} (11,030/sq mi)
- Postcode: 3143
Suburbs around Armadale
South Yarra	Toorak	Malvern
Prahran	Armadale	Malvern
St Kilda East	Caulfield North	Caulfield North

Armadale is an inner suburb in Melbourne, Victoria, Australia, 7 kilometres (4.3 mi) south-east of Melbourne's Central Business District, located within the City of Stonnington local government area. Armadale recorded a population of 9,368 at the 2021 census.

The suburb has two railways stations: Armadale, and Toorak. It is bordered by Glenferrie Road to the east, Orrong Road to the west, Malvern Road to the north and Dandenong Road/Princes Highway to the south.

== History ==
Armadale is named after Armadale, Sutherland in Scotland, the birthplace of James Munro, the 15th Premier of Victoria, who also lived in Armadale Melbourne. Armadale Post Office on High Street opened on 2 October 1884. The Armadale North Post Office, near Toorak Station, opened in 1940.

=== Heritage listings ===
The following places in Armadale are listed on the Victorian Heritage Register:

- Armadale House: Kooyong Road, constructed in 1876 for James Munro, is a two-storey Italianate mansion laid out in a traditional arrangement, on a reduced site facing Kooyong Road.
- Armadale Primary School: Densham Road (also known as Primary School No. 2634), was constructed between 1886 and 1889 to the designs of architect Samuel E Bindley of the Public Works Department, in a Gothic Revival style. In 1901, a purpose built Infant School accompanied the primary school, also designed by Samuel E Bindley, in a Federation Romanesque style.

== Demographics ==
In the 2021 census, there were 9,368 people living in Armadale.

67.3% of people were born in Australia. The next most common countries of birth were England (3.5%), China (3.1%), India (2.2%), New Zealand (1.9%) and South Africa (1.1%).

77% of people only spoke English at home. Other languages spoken at home included Mandarin (3.7%), Greek (2.4%), Cantonese (1.2%), Spanish (0.9%), and French (0.7%).

The most common responses for religion were no religion (42.3%), Catholic (17.1%), Anglican (11.8%), and Judaism (6.8%).

== Today ==
Armadale is considered one of Melbourne's premier blue chip areas, with High Street, its main thoroughfare, containing high-end shops and hair salons. Glenferrie Road, which divides Armadale and Malvern, is well known for its shops and restaurants. Armadale contains and is close to some of Melbourne's private schools, including Lauriston Girls' School and the King David School. Armadale also contains a number of parks, including Toorak Park, Victory Square Reserve, Armadale Reserve and Union Street Gardens.

== Notable residents ==
- Forbes Carlile – (b. 1921) Olympics swimming coach was born in Armadale in
- Missy Higgins – singer-songwriter who attended Armadale Primary School
- Ross Higgins – (b. 1931) actor, best known for his role as Ted Bulpitt in the television series Kingswood Country was born in Armadale
- Edith Ingpen – an architect, born in Armadale
- Sam Loxton – test cricketer who attended Armadale Public School
- James Munro, the 15th Premier of Victoria, lived in Armadale
- Sir Eric Pearce – former Channel 9 newsreader
- Sir John Spicer – former attorney-general
- Richard Stubbs – radio personality
- Trevor Vincent – Commonwealth Games gold medalist

== See also ==
- City of Malvern – Parts of Armadale were previously within this former local government area.
- City of Prahran – Parts of Armadale were previously within this former local government area.
