= Australian Communist Party v Commonwealth =

Judgement of the Australian High Court

- Court: High Court of Australia
- Full case name: Australian Communist Party v The Commonwealth
- Decided: 9 March 1951
- Citations: [1951] HCA 5, (1951) 83 CLR 1

Court membership
- Judges sitting: Latham CJ, Dixon, McTiernan, Williams, Webb, Fullagar, and Kitto JJ

Case opinions
- The Communist Party Dissolution Act 1950 (Cth) is beyond the power of the Parliament and is invalid. It is not supported by the express incidental power read with the executive power of the Constitution or under an implied nationhood power. The Act does not prescribe any rule of conduct or prohibit specific acts or omissions by way of attack or subversion, but deal directly with bodies and persons named and described. "The stream cannot rise above the source", or, "The Parliament cannot recite itself into power" the Parliament itself purports to determine, or empower the Executive to determine, the very facts upon which the existence of the power depends.
- Majority: Dixon, McTiernan, Williams, Webb, Fullagar, and Kitto JJ
- Dissent: Latham CJ

Australian Communist Party v The Commonwealth, also known as the Communist Party Case, was a legal case in the High Court of Australia in 1951 in which the court declared the Communist Party Dissolution Act 1950 unconstitutional and invalid as being beyond the power of the Parliament. Notable Australian academic George Winterton described the case as "undoubtedly one of the High Court's most important decisions".

== Background ==
In the general election held on 10 December 1949, Prime Minister Robert Menzies led a Liberal-Country Party coalition to government pledged to dissolving the Communist Party of Australia. The party had been banned before: following the Molotov–Ribbentrop Pact, the party had opposed Australian involvement in World War II in 1939, which gave Menzies' United Australia Party-Country Party government the opportunity to dissolve it on 15 June 1940 under the National Security (Subversive Associations) Regulations 1940 (Cth) relying on the defence power of the Constitution of Australia. These regulations were invalidated by the High Court in the Jehovah's Witnesses case (Adelaide Company of Jehovah's Witnesses Inc v Commonwealth (1943) 67 CLR 116.) Before that, the ban on the Communist Party (now supporting the war after the invasion of the Soviet Union) was lifted by the Curtin government in December 1942.

The Communist Party Dissolution Bill was brought into the House of Representatives by Prime Minister Menzies on 27 April 1950.

The Bill began with a long preamble with nine 'recitals', which: "(a) cited the three powers principally relied upon: section 51(vi) of the Constitution (the defence power), section 51(xxxix) (the express incidental power), and section 61 (the executive power); "(b) summarised the case against the Communist Party by reference to its objectives and activities: it was said to engage in activities designed, in accordance with 'the basic theory of communism, as expounded by Marx and Lenin', to create a 'revolutionary situation' enabling it 'to seize power and establish a dictatorship of the proletariat.' To this end, it engaged in 'activities ... designed to ... overthrow ... the established system of government in Australia and the attainment of economic, industrial or political ends by force, ... intimidation or [fraud]', especially espionage, sabotage, treason or subversion, and promoted strikes to disrupt production in industries vital to Australia's security and defence, including coal-mining, steel, engineering, building, transport and power; and "(c) asserted that the measures taken by the Bill were necessary for Australia's defence and security and the execution and maintenance of its Constitution and laws, thereby tying the Bill's operative provisions to the powers cited in (a)."

The Bill went on to (1) declare unlawful the Australian Communist Party, confiscating without compensation the property of the party; (2) deal with "affiliated organizations" (including any attempt to reconstitute the party) by purporting to empower the Governor-General (in effect, the Executive) to declare unlawful affiliated bodies if satisfied that their existence was prejudicial to security and defence which resulted in dissolution and seizure of its property; evidence supporting a declaration had to be considered (not necessarily accepted as proof) by a committee of Government appointees and affected organisations could only gain relief by proving to a Court that they were not an affiliate but were unable to challenge security declarations; further, it created an offence for a person knowingly to be an officer or member of an unlawful association and liable to 5 years imprisonment; and (3) persons could be declared to be a communist or Party officer or member and to be engaged, or 'likely to engage', in activities prejudicial to the security and defence of Australia: such declared persons could not be employed by the Commonwealth or a Commonwealth authority, nor could they hold office in a union in an industry declared by the governor-general to be 'vital to the security and defence of Australia.'

The Bill was subjected to vigorous debate. In the House of Representatives, the Government accepted some Opposition amendments but rejected the Opposition-controlled Senate amendments.

A re-drafted Communist Party Dissolution Bill [No. 2] was introduced by Menzies on Thursday, 28 September 1950. In his second reading speech, Menzies threatened a double dissolution of Parliament if the Senate again rejected the measure. The Labor Party Opposition allowed it passage through the Senate on 19 October 1950 and the Government wasted no time in gaining royal assent and making the Act operative the following day.

On the day the Act became law, summonses were issued out of the High Court challenging the validity of the Act. The actions named as respondents:

- the Commonwealth of Australia;
- Robert Gordon Menzies, the prime minister of the said Commonwealth for the time being;
- John Armstrong Spicer, Attorney-General of the said Commonwealth for the time being;
- William John McKell, the governor-general of the Commonwealth;
- and Arnold Victor Richardson the receiver of the property of the Communist Party.

The various plaintiffs were:

- the Communist Party of Australia,
- Ralph Siward Gibson and Ernest William Campbell (editor, Tribune), who sued on behalf of and for the benefit of all the members of the Australia Communist Party;
- the Waterside Workers' Federation of Australia and its general secretary, James Healy;
- the Australian Railways Union and its general secretary, John Joseph Brown;
- Edwin William Bulmer (who sued for the Building Workers' Industrial Union which was deregistered at the time) and Frank Purse;
- the Amalgamated Engineering Union, Australian Section, and Edward John Rowe, a member of the Commonwealth Council of the AEU;
- Seamen's Union of Australia and its general secretary, Eliot Valens Elliott;
- the Federated Ironworkers' Association of Australia and its national secretary, Leslie John McPhillips; and
- the Australian Coal and Shale Employees' Federation and its general president Idris Williams.

These plaintiffs were later joined by a group of intervenors:

- the Federated Ship Painters and Dockers Union;
- Sheet Metal Workers' Union;
- Federated Clerks' Union of Australia (New South Wales Branch) and its secretary, Maurice John Rodwell Hughes.

The matter was sent to Justice Dixon who stated a case for the full court to consider.

When the High Court assembled to hear the matter, the bar table was crowded with the leading names of the Sydney and Melbourne Bars. For the Commonwealth and other respondents: Garfield Barwick KC, Alan Taylor KC, Victor Windeyer KC, Stanley Lewis KC, Richard Ashburner, Bernard Riley, Murray McInerney, Cliff Menhennitt, George Lush and Bruce MacFarlan. The Communist Party and its officers and members were represented by Fred Paterson, Ted Laurie KC, Ted Hill and Max Julius. The unions were represented by various combinations of counsel: H V Evatt KC, Gregory Gowans KC, Simon Isaacs KC, G T A Sullivan, Claude Weston KC, C M Collins and Maurice Ashkanasy KC.

The case began argument on Tuesday, 14 November 1950 and continued through a total of 24 sitting days in Sydney concluding submissions on Tuesday, 19 December 1950. The Court reserved its decision which was delivered in Melbourne on Friday, 9 March 1951.

== Decision ==
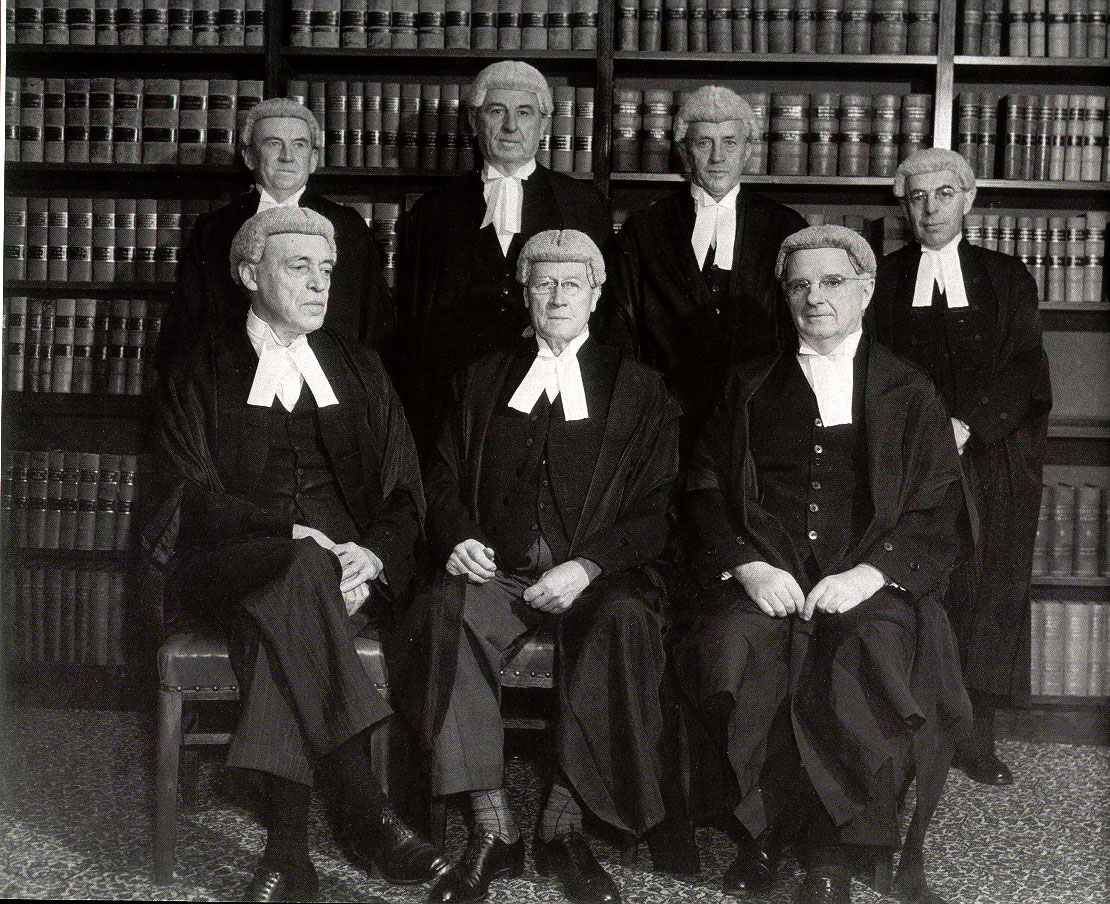
The justices of the Court that sat on this case. Back (left to right): Wilfred Fullagar, William Webb, Dudley Williams, Frank Kitto. Front (left to right): Owen Dixon, John Latham, Edward McTiernan.

Six of the justices ruled that the act was invalid, over the sole dissent of the Chief Justice John Latham.

All seven judges accepted that the Commonwealth had legislative power to deal with subversion (although they differed as to the precise location of such a power) and that it had validly done so in the Crimes Act 1914 (Cth). Unlike the challenged law, the sedition provisions left questions of guilt to the courts to determine through criminal trials.

However, the Communist Party Dissolution Act 1950 (Cth) had simply declared the party guilty and had authorised the executive government to 'declare' individuals or groups of individuals. The validity of the law depended on the existence of a fact (a constitutional fact) which the law asserted to be a fact whether or not there actually was any factual connection between those bodies or persons and subversion. In the metaphor used by Fullagar J, "a stream cannot rise higher than its source". "The validity of a law or of an administrative act done under a law cannot be made to depend on the opinion of the law-maker, or the person who is to do the act, that the law or the consequence of the act is within the constitutional power upon which the law in question itself depends for its validity. A power to make laws with respect to lighthouses does not authorize the making of a law with respect to anything which is, in the opinion of the law-maker, a lighthouse. A power to make a proclamation carrying legal consequences with respect to a lighthouse is one thing: a power to make a similar proclamation with respect to anything which in the opinion of the Governor-General is a lighthouse is another thing.".

This reasoning is predicated on the notion of judicial review, sometimes referred to as the principle in Marbury v. Madison in recognition of its origins in the federal system of the United States of America. In performing the function of judicial review, the judges insist that their role is judicial and not political. In a well-known passage, Justice Wilfred Fullagar expressed this by stating,

It should be observed at this stage that nothing depends on the justice or injustice of the law in question. If the language of an Act of Parliament is clear, its merits and demerits are alike beside the point. It is the law, and that is all. Such a law as the Communist Party Dissolution Act could clearly be passed by the Parliament of the United Kingdom or of any of the Australian States. It is only because the legislative power of the Commonwealth Parliament is limited by an instrument emanating from a superior authority that it arises in the case of the Commonwealth Parliament. If the great case of Marbury v. Madison (1803) 1 Cr. 137 [2 Law. Ed. 118] had pronounced a different view, it might perhaps not arise even in the case of the Commonwealth Parliament; and there are those, even to-day, who disapprove of the doctrine of Marbury v. Madison (1803) 1 Cr. 137 [2 Law. Ed. 118], and who do not see why the courts, rather than the legislature itself, should have the function of finally deciding whether an Act of a legislature in a Federal system is or is not within power. But in our system the principle of Marbury v. Madison (1803) 1 Cr. 137 [2 Law. Ed. 118] is accepted as axiomatic, modified in varying degree in various cases (but never excluded) by the respect which the judicial organ must accord to opinions of the legislative and executive organs.

=== Latham's dissent ===
Latham, the sole dissenter, found the act to be a valid exercise of the federal parliament's defence power. His opinion sought to uphold parliamentary supremacy, on the grounds that the exercise of the defence power was inherently a matter for political rather than judicial judgment. He was the only member of the court who had previously served as a government minister. Andrew Lynch included Latham's dissent in his compilation Great Australian Dissents, with a chapter authored by George Williams. Lynch described it as "probably the most controversial inclusion" and Williams stated that it had been "eclipsed by the brilliance of the majority position". Justice Ian Callinan extensively quoted Latham in his opinion in Thomas v Mowbray (2007), relating to anti-terrorism laws.

== Aftermath ==
Later in the year, at the 1951 referendum, Menzies sought to amend the Constitution to permit the parliament to make laws in respect of Communists and Communism where this was necessary for the security of the Commonwealth. If passed, this would have given a government the power to introduce a bill proposing to ban the Communist Party (although whether it would have passed the Senate is an open question). However, the Opposition leader H. V. Evatt campaigned strongly on civil liberties grounds, and the proposal was narrowly defeated with the results at 50.56% for No to 49.44% for Yes or 52,000 vote difference.

== Legacy ==
Following the Bondi Beach terrorist attack in 2025, the government passed legislation outlawing the neo-nazi group National Socialist Network and thwarting their attempts to register a political party. As of September 2026, the legislation is being challenged in the High Court as the White Australia Party v Commonwealth. The Communist Party Case is being cited as precedent in the legal arguments presented by the White Australia Party in their legal case against the government.

== See also ==
- List of banned political parties
- Royal Commission Inquiring into the Origins, Aims, Objects and Funds of the Communist Party in Victoria and Other Related Matters (1949–1950)
