= Ralph de Boissière =

Australian novelist of Trinidadian origin (1907–2008)

- Born: Ralph Anthony Charles de Boissière; 6 October 1907; Port of Spain, Trinidad and Tobago
- Died: 16 February 2008 (aged 100); Melbourne, Australia
- Education: Queen's Royal College
- Occupation: Novelist
- Notable work: Crown Jewel (1952); Rum and Coca-Cola (1956)

Ralph Anthony Charles de Boissière (6 October 1907 – 16 February 2008) was a Trinidad-born social realist novelist, who in 1948 settled in Melbourne, Australia. Described as "an outspoken opponent of racism, injustice, greed and corruption, a passionate humanist with a vision of a just society", de Boissière was the author of four novels although he was most acclaimed for the first two: Crown Jewel and Rum and Coca-Cola, both originally published in the 1950s. A fifth novel, titled Homeless in Paradise, remains unpublished.

== Biography ==
Ralph de Boissière was born in Port of Spain, Trinidad, the son of Armand de Boissière, a solicitor, and Maude Harper, an Englishwoman who died three weeks later. He attended Queen's Royal College and during this time discovered the Russian authors, Tolstoy, Turgenev, Gorky, Chekhov, Pushkin and Gogol, who were to remain a lasting influence:

They wrote of a vast country in which the weight of tsarism was destroying millions.... crying out against an entire system in which the guilt of the rulers was being ignored while millions were dying from neglect.... The writers of that time are still my favourites.... A hundred and fifty years later the crimes against mankind have multiplied and are choking us all. But not many today write with that call to humankind, that call which, though muffled by the censor, could still boom out its message.

Initially, de Boissière wished to become a concert pianist; however, on leaving school, he took a job as a salesman, which enlightened him to the living and working conditions of ordinary Trinidadians. He then became involved in left-wing and trade union politics, campaigning as well as writing. A story of his, "Booze and the Goberdaw", appeared in the 1929 Christmas issue of a short-lived publication called Trinidad, edited by Alfred Mendes and C. L. R. James. De Boissière became part of the group of young writers, including James, who published in Trinidad's first literary magazine The Beacon (March 1931 – November 1933), edited by Albert Gomes.

In 1935, de Boissière married Ivy Alcantara (died 1984) and they had two daughters. In 1947, having lost his job and unable to find another one because of his political activities, he and his family left the country for Chicago, afterwards moving to the Australian city of Melbourne in 1948. He found work in Australia as salesman and a factory-hand. Aged 42, de Boissière settled into a clerical job, from which he retired in 1980.

In Australia, he joined the Communist Party and had his first novel, Crown Jewel, published in 1952 by the leftist Australasian Realist Writers. Like all his work, this book depicts the struggles of the working class with realistic sympathy, culminating with a portrayal of a 1937 strike in Trinidad brutally put down by police shooting. He subsequently wrote four more novels and his work has been translated into Polish, German, Russian, Bulgarian, Romanian, Czech and Chinese. His writing has been described by one critic as "combin[ing] social realism and political commitment with a concern for the culture of the feeling within the individual in a way that is unique not only among West Indian writers but among writers with a social conscience anywhere in the world."

The literary archive of Ralph de Boissière is held at the National Library of Australia (Papers of Ralph de Boissière) and comprises his manuscripts, "typescripts of his novels and screenplays; diaries; correspondence; reviews; and, photographic prints and negatives".

== Personal life ==
In 2007, his centenary year, de Boissière married his longtime companion, Dr. Annie Greet, his fourth novel, Call of the Rainbow, was published in Melbourne, and in November, he received an honorary Doctor of Literature degree from the University of Trinidad and Tobago. His autobiography, Life on the Edge, was posthumously published (edited and introduced by Kenneth Ramchand) in 2010.

== Death ==
De Boissière died in Melbourne, Australia, on 16 February 2008, aged 100.

== Bibliography ==
=== Novels ===
- Crown Jewel (Australasian Book Society, 1952; London: Allison and Busby, 1981)
- Rum and Coca-Cola (Australasian Book Society, 1956; London: Allison and Busby, 1984)
- No Saddles for Kangaroos (Australasian Book Society, 1964)
- Call of the Rainbow (Melbourne: L.A. Browne, 2007)

Unpublished

- Homeless in Paradise

=== Autobiography ===
- The Autobiography of Ralph de Boissière: Life on the Edge (Caroni, Trinidad: Lexicon, 2010)
