= Royal Commission Inquiring into the Origins, Aims, Objects and Funds of the Communist Party in Victoria and Other Related Matters =

1949–1950 commission regarding the Communist Party of Australia

The Royal Commission Inquiring into the Origins, Aims, Objects and Funds of the Communist Party in Victoria and Other Related Matters was held before Justice Sir Charles Lowe from 6 June 1949 to 6 March 1950, sitting for 154 days. It was to examine the workings of the Communist Party of Australia (CPA), within Victoria. This was in a post-World War II Australian Cold War environment, where the CPA had been banned throughout Australia from June 1940 to December 1942.

The commission was precipitated by a series of articles in The Herald newspaper two months prior, led to calls for a national royal commission into the activities of the CPA within Australia, and was followed by events that culminated in the Australian Communist Party v Commonwealth court case.

The Executive Council of Victoria appointed Lowe on 19 May 1949 to be the royal commissioner. Lowe was assisted by Reginald Sholl KC. E. F. 'Ted' Hill represented the CPA, and their leading counsel was Australia's only CPA member ever elected to parliament, Frederick W. Paterson.

== Terms of reference ==
The inquiry scope was "whether the Communist party by its constitution or propaganda advocates or encourages the overthrow by force or violence of established government". Additionally, whether the activities or operations of the party or any of its members have been designed to effect or accomplish—

1. The overthrow or disruption of representative or democratic institutions;
2. The subversion of law and order;
3. The attainment of social, economic, industrial or political ends by force, violence, intimidation or fraudulent practices;
4. The dislocation or disruption of services safeguarding or essential to the maintenance of the life, health and welfare of the community;
5. The dislocation, disruption or retardation of industrial production; and
6. The indoctrination of children and young people with beliefs or ideas calculated or likely to result in activities and operations of the nature referred to.

== Principal witness Cecil Sharpley ==
The principal witness was former Victorian executive member of the CPA, Cecil Herbert Sharpley (1908–1985). Sharpley was also a journalist and when the party was declared illegal (1940–1942), he established an illegal press and printing of the party's Guardian newspaper. Sharpley later admitted a leading article in the Guardian represented the party policy to support the Soviet Union and defeat the Menzies Government.

Seeking to denounce the party, it was Sharpley's work with journalists of The Herald that led to the commission. A seven-article long investigative journalism piece, first being published on 16 April 1949, was on the CPA accusing the party of election fraud. For writing the articles, Sharpley later admitted he was to be paid £700 (equivalent to A$58,000 in 2020), and had living expenses also met during the writing period. Part of his claims included union ballot rigging from 1937 over twelve years.

He gave evidence for twenty-eight days (over 110 hours in the witness box) and questioned by fourteen counsels.

=== Imagination ===
Earlier in May 1949 it was said by the Postmaster-General that the Herald articles were drawn from imagination and not objective, and one witness during the inquiry also saying Sharpley's evidence was "imaginary". After a report by Justice Lowe was published in 1950 following the Commission, Sharpley's evidence was found unreliable.

Sharpley left Australia and arrived in England on 19 December 1949, and did not return.

== Outcomes ==
Released by the start of May 1950, a report of 70,000 words, based on examination of 159 witnesses and 1083 documents, found "a damning indictment of the activities of a body of men enjoying the advantages of the Australian way of life while plotting to overthrow the country's established institutions and to sabotage its industrial machinery".

Communist activist Ralph Gibson (and commission witness) concluded that Justice Lowe, "contrary to our fears and to the Government's hopes, displayed a certain genuine interest in Communist theory and a certain respect for evidence".

== Parties ==
Some of the persons involved in the proceedings were:

- Dick Diamond (1906–1989), communist, state secretary of Actors Equity, and witness
- Malcolm Henry Ellis (1890–1969), journalist and anti-communist witness
- Ralph Gibson (1906–1989), communist and former State CPA president, and witness
- E. F. 'Ted' Hill (1915–1988), communist and counsel, and named in the final section of the report
- Max Julius (1916–1963), communist and counsel assisting E. A. H. Laurie
- Patricia Kennedy (1916–2012), actress, member of Actors Equity, and witness
- E. A. H. 'Ted' Laurie (1912–1989), communist and counsel
- Jack Malvern Lazarus (1917–1992), named in the final section of the report (unfounded allegation)
- Sir Charles Lowe (1880–1969), presiding judge
- Samuel Merrifield MLA (1904–1982), Victorian politician, and witness (alleged to have taken part in pre-war communist activities), and named in the final section of the report
- Frederick W. Paterson (1897–1977), communist and leading counsel
- Cecil Sharpley (1908–1985), trade unionist, former member of State CPA executive, principal witness
- Reginald Sholl KC (1902–1988), counsel assisting the commission
- Ronald Grant Taylor, communist solicitor as witness, and named in the final section of the report (unfounded allegation)

== See also ==
- Australian Communist Party v Commonwealth [1951] HCA 5
- List of Victorian royal commissions
