= Reginald Sholl =

Australian lawyer, judge, diplomat, commentator

Sir Reginald Sholl
- Born: Reginald Richard Sholl; 8 October 1902; East Melbourne, Victoria, Australia
- Died: 7 August 1988 (aged 85); Southport, Queensland, Australia
- Education: University of Melbourne (BA, MA)
- Occupations: Lawyer, diplomat, commentator
- Spouses: Hazel Ethel Bradshaw (m. 1927; died 1962) Anna McLean nee Carpenter (m. 1964)

Sir Reginald Richard Sholl (8 October 1902 – 7 August 1988) was an Australian lawyer, judge, diplomat, commentator.

Sholl was born in East Melbourne in 1902. Having attended Melbourne Grammar School and the University of Melbourne, Sholl was selected as Victorian Rhodes scholar for 1924. Whilst studying at Oxford University he lived at New College, and learnt to play rugby. He received a university blue in football, and also played lacrosse for Oxford and Combined Universities. In 1927, Sholl was a journalist in London with the Australian Press Association.

During World War II, he served with the Australian Military Forces, and Australian Imperial Forces in New Guinea.

Sholl was appointed a King's Counsel in Victoria in February 1947, in Tasmania in August 1947, and elsewhere in 1948. In June 1949, he was appointed as counsel assisting Justice Charles Lowe in the Royal Commission Inquiring into the Origins, Aims, Objects and Funds of the Communist Party in Victoria and Other Related Matters.

In January 1950 Sholl was appointed a judge in the Supreme Court of Victoria, replacing Sir James Macfarlan. In 1952, he suggested it would be appropriate to order corporal punishment for violent crimes.

Sholl was knighted in June 1962.

In 1966, Sholl picked up an overseas posting, serving the Australian Government as Australian Consul-General in New York.

In 1970, Sholl joined the committee of the Overseas Services Bureau. The Bureau was responsible for the Australian Volunteers Abroad scheme.

In 1974 and 1975 Sholl conducted a Royal Commission into airline services to Western Australia.

Diplomatic posts
Preceded by Roden Cutler	Australian Consul-General in New York; 1966–1968	Succeeded by Francis Murray as Acting Consul-General
