= Horse trams in Adelaide =

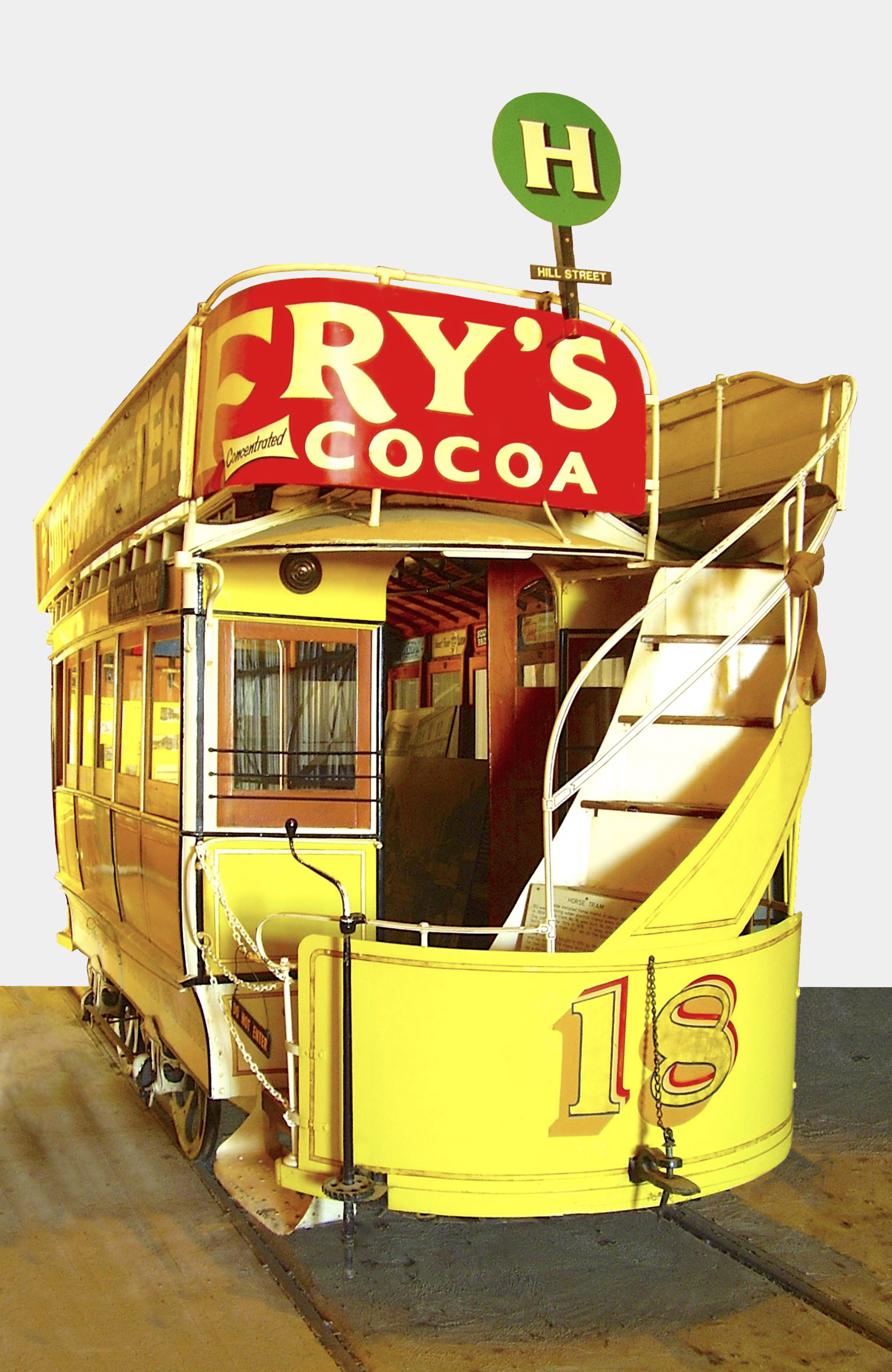
- Horse tram no. 18 of the Adelaide & Suburban Tramway Company, now at the Tramway Museum, St Kilda. Built by the John Stephenson Company of New York, it was one of the first trams ordered for Adelaide's new services.

Operation
- Locale: Adelaide, South Australia
- Open: 1878
- Close: 1917
- Status: Key dates: 1878–1907: Owned by private companies.; 1907: Assets of most companies sold to SA Government.; 1907–1917: Municipal Tramways Trust starts up; runs horse trams while electrifying between 1909 and 1917.; 1914: MTT's horse tram services cease except for the isolated Port Adelaide lines.; 1917: Last MTT horse tram service ceases at Port Adelaide.
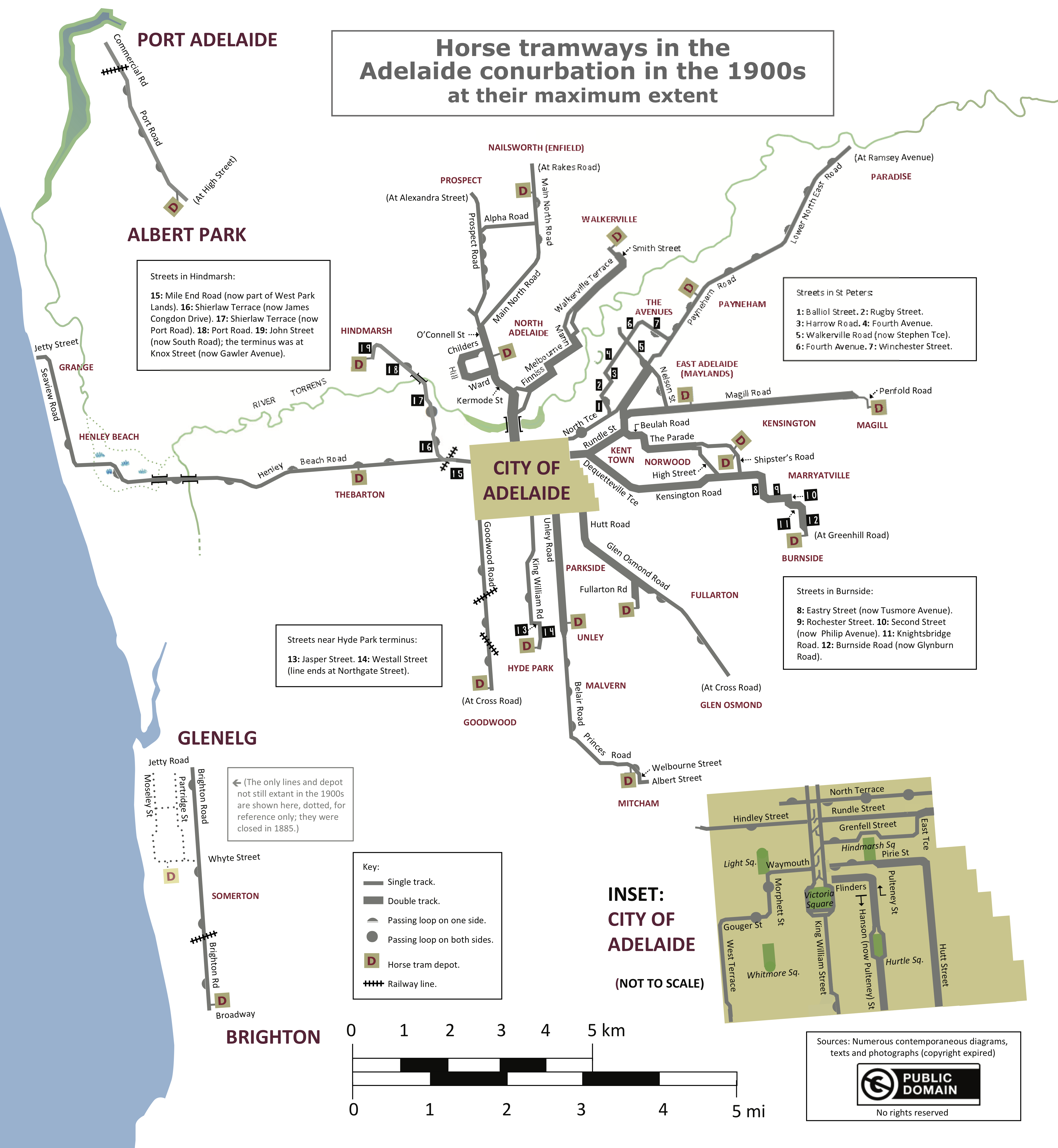
- Routes: Adelaide's horse tramway routes at their maximum extent, in the 1900s (click map to enlarge).
- Operators: Until 1907: private companies (11 eventually); 1907–1917: Municipal Tramways Trust while electrification was introduced

Infrastructure
- Track gauge: 1435 mm (4 ft 8 1/2 in), except one line of 1600 mm (5 ft 3 in)
- Propulsion systems: Usually two horses, sometimes three
- Depot: 19 company depots
- Stock: 162 cars and 1056 horses in 1907

Statistics
- Track length (total): 119 km (74 mi) by 1901; double track nearer the city, mainly single with passing loops further out.

Many private companies operated horse trams in Adelaide from 1878 until 1917 on routes that eventually ran for more than 100 kilometres within a 16 kilometres (10 miles) radius of the Adelaide General Post Office, as shown in the map in the infobox. The trams were extremely popular, since they were more comfortable than the horse-drawn jaunting cars, carriages and omnibuses that operated on the poorly formed roads of the time. The majority of people in the Adelaide suburban area, as it was then, were within walking distance of a horse tram route.

The companies laid tracks and ran trams wherever demand was apparent, and most remained in business for up to three decades. However, Adelaide was eventually the last capital city in Australia to be without faster, higher-capacity, cleaner electric or cable trams; the public eventually saw the quaint vehicles as a blot on their city's image and clamoured for electric trams. However, in the early years of the 20th century, following a sustained large-scale drought and with increasing popularity of the "safety bicycle", few of the companies were making a profit and none could afford the capital cost involved.

In 1907 the South Australian Government bought the companies' assets and formed the Municipal Tramways Trust (MTT) to establish electric tram services, which were opened from 1909. Electrification generally proceeded rapidly. However, for the next eight years horse trams provided interim services, under MTT ownership, while electric transmission infrastructure and new tracks were progressively completed. Horse trams ceased running on Adelaide-centric routes in 1914 and on the isolated Port Adelaide lines in 1917, 39 years after the first horse trams operated.

== Investigations ==
Public transport was beyond the financial reach of many people in Adelaide's early days following European settlement in 1836. However, the 1870s brought good harvests and prosperity to South Australia, and one of the consequences was a vast improvement in Adelaide transport services through the widespread introduction of horse buses, which charged fares about one-fifth those of coaches. But despite some good services, many of the operators had little regard for their customers' interests: complaints were made that the conveyances were filthy, with faded and ragged seat cushions and compartments rarely swept out.

During the early 1870s Sir Edwin Smith and Mr W. C. Buik, both prominent in Kensington and Norwood Corporation then Adelaide City Council (and both later mayors of Adelaide), spent some time inspecting European tramways. They were impressed with horse trams, since one horse hauling a tram could move three to ten times as many people compared with a horse-drawn omnibus and the ride was far superior. On returning to Adelaide they promoted the concept. In April 1875 they issued a prospectus for a new joint stock company, the Adelaide and Suburban Tramway Company. Private commercial interests lobbied the state government for legislative support, over Adelaide City Council's objections related to licensing and control.

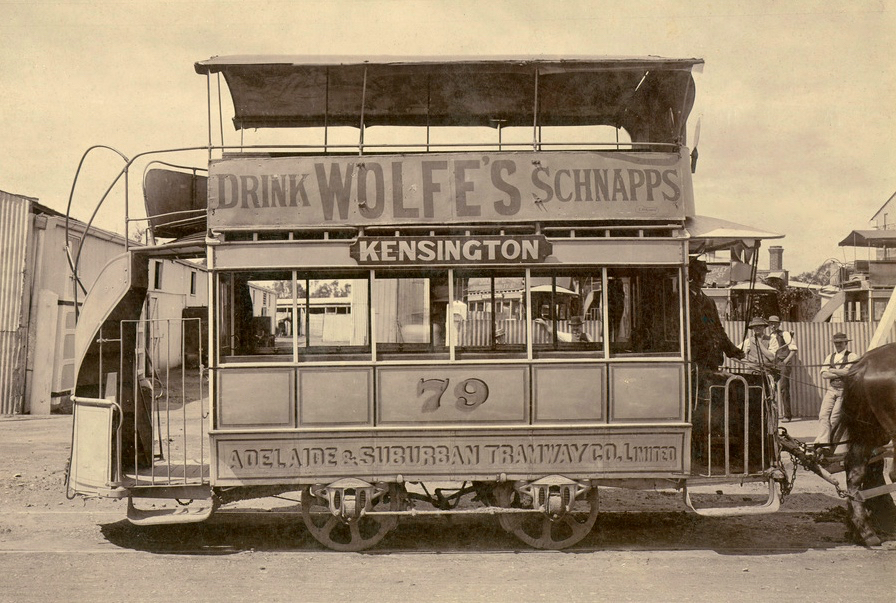
Horse tram 79 of the Adelaide & Suburban Tramway Company Limited at the Kensington depot, about 1909. Horse trams were built to be as light as possible to maximise payload. Occasionally, when another tram needed to pass, the passengers and the two crew would get out, "derail" the tram and wheel it aside to make way.

Public expectations were favourable, reflected by an editorial comment in The Register newspaper:

Of the advantage of street tramways there can be no doubt. Whatever incredulity might at one time have existed upon the subject is now entirely removed by the great success which has attended their introduction in England and on the Continent of Europe, as well as in America. ...

There can be no question that Adelaide is greatly behind many modern cities in facilities for street conveyance, those which are provided being in many respects a long way behind the times. The experience of other cities where railways worked by horse traction have been in use for some time is universal in their favour. The unpleasant jolting which is a general characteristic of a ride in most of our city conveyances is done away with, and greater safety and convenience are ensured.

The Adelaide and Suburban Tramway Company had prudently refrained from committing itself to ordering equipment until the Parliament of South Australia passed the necessary private Act granting powers to construct and operate the line. It was 19 months before that occurred, especially since considerable opposition was raised by the Corporation of the City of Adelaide, mainly over who should have the right to control and license the cars.

== The first horse tram line ==
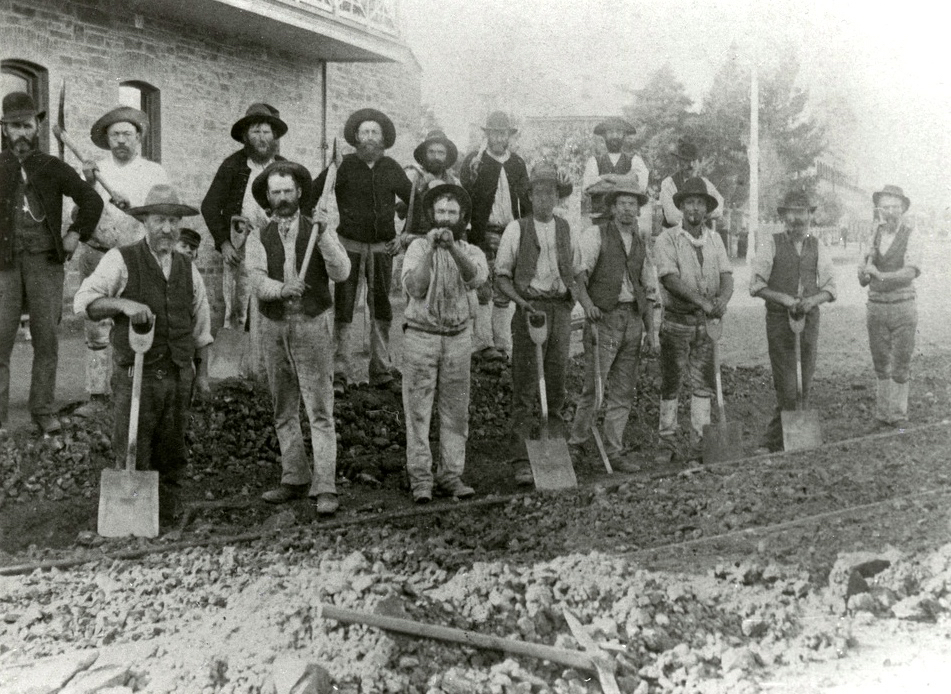
"Navvies" restoring the road surface in which a horse tram track has been laid in the suburb of Mitcham, about 1880.

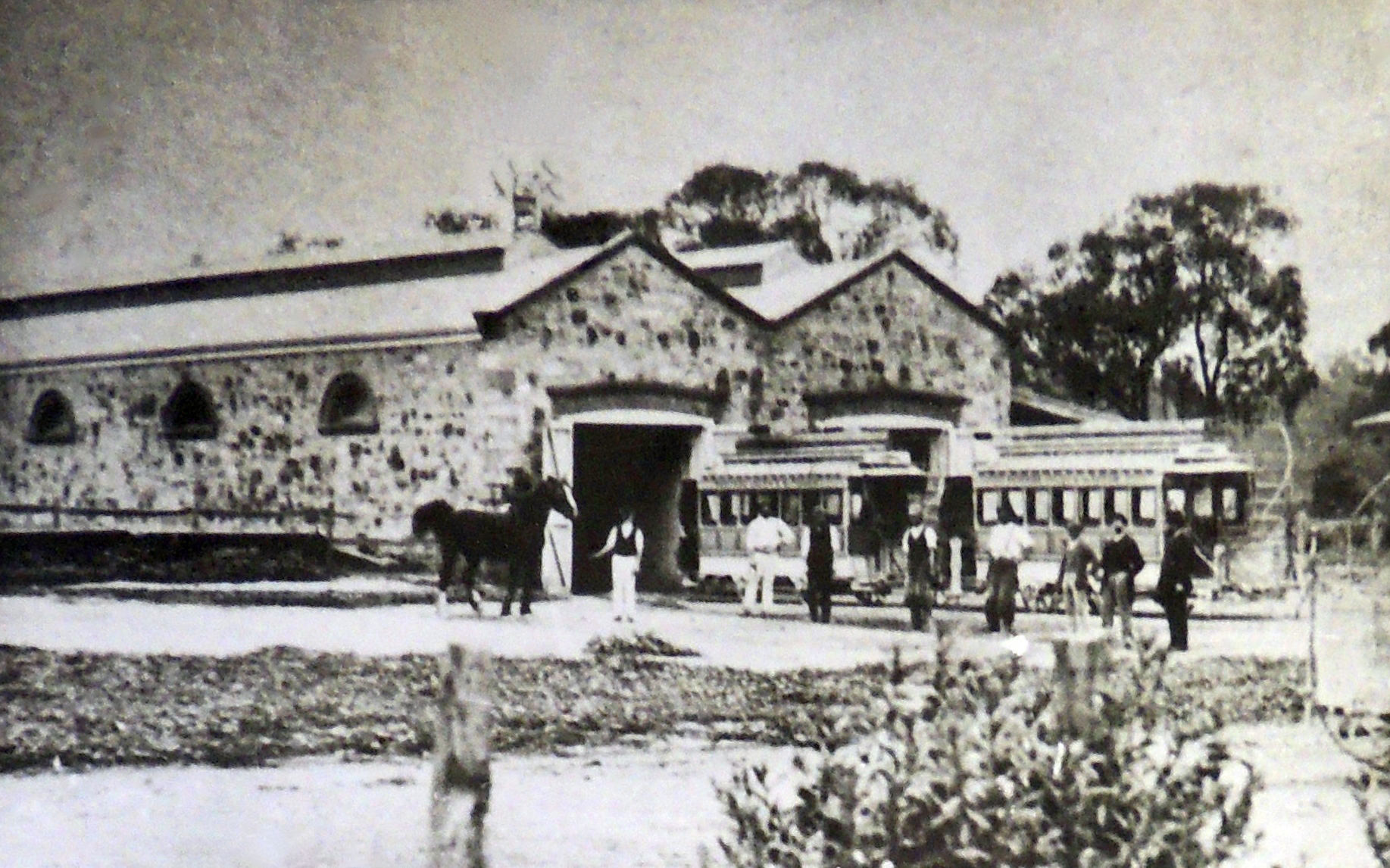
The substantial horse tram depot at Mitcham in 1879, a year after Adelaide's first trams operated. The two cars are double-decked but with no covering upstairs.

Construction of the tram lines, eventually totalling 119 km (74 mi), was entirely by manual labour supplemented for some tasks by horses.

In addition to rails and sleepers, the Adelaide and Suburban Tramway Company ordered twelve new cars – eight single-decked 18-seaters and four double-decked, with 22 seats downstairs and 24 upstairs – from the John Stephenson Company of New York in the United States. (Note: John Stephenson, an American coachbuilder, invented and patented the first streetcar to run on rails in the United States.) Another 12 months therefore elapsed before the Governor of South Australia ceremoniously laid the first rail on 29 October 1877.

The company began its first service from Adelaide to Kensington Park without further ceremony on 10 June 1878. (Note: By 1878 two horse-drawn passenger services were already operating in South Australia. The older service, operated by the South Australian Railways, was on a railway – sometimes called a tramway – 11 km (7 mi) long, which opened in 1854. Horses rather than steam locomotives were deployed as the sole motive power to save costs, and remained so until 1884. The railway ran between Goolwa on the busy River Murray and the ocean harbour at Port Elliot. The line carried passengers although its main purpose was to move freight from shallow-draft vessels navigating the river at Goolwa to coastal and ocean-going vessels calling at Port Elliot, beyond the dangerous river mouth. Passenger services were also operating regularly on the Moonta Town–Moonta Bay section (built in 1866) of the Kadina and Wallaroo Railway and Pier Company's broad-gauge railway, on which horses hauled copper ore cars to smelters at Wallaroo. Eight months after the first Adelaide service started, the South Australian Railways opened a passenger-only horse tram service in Gawler.)

The service became the first permanent tramway system of an Australian city. (Note: The word "permanent" is the operative word in the Adelaide "first tramway" claim: the first tramway to operate in Australia ran along Pitt Street in Sydney in 1861 but closed in 1866.) Ironically, in due course Adelaide would become the last Australian capital city to discard horse trams for more modern public transport – but in 1878 horse trams everywhere were a source of wonder, reflected in Henry James's novel The Europeans, published in that year:

From time to time a strange vehicle drew near to the place where they stood – such a vehicle as the lady at the window, in spite of a considerable acquaintance with human inventions, had never seen before: a huge, low omnibus, painted in brilliant colors, and decorated apparently with jangling bells, attached to a species of groove in the pavement, through which it was dragged, with a great deal of rumbling, bouncing and scratching, by a couple of remarkably small horses. When it reached a certain point the people, [mainly] women, carrying satchels and parcels, projected themselves upon it in a compact body – a movement suggesting the scramble for places in a life-boat at sea – and were engulfed in its large interior. Then the life-boat ... went bumping and jingling away upon its invisible wheels, with the helmsman (the man at the wheel) guiding its course incongruously from the prow.

A writer in The SA Register in September 1877 rhapsodised about the American tram cars then being assembled by Adelaide company Duncan & Fraser:

The object sought to be attained in all American vehicles and machines is a maximum of strength with a minimum of weight, and the manner in which this has been effected in the tramway cars is both interesting and wonderful. ... Though rather different in form to anything we have previously seen in this city the car is very elegant in appearance, and is painted and ornamented in the most chaste and tasteful manner. ... The interior of the car is elegant in the extreme. It is fitted throughout in native American woods, all of light colours and varnished. The seats which run along the sides are marvels of lightness, cleanliness, and comfort. ... The ventilation – that most important consideration in a climate such as ours – is thoroughly provided for by means of adjustable panels in the ceiling.

The Kensington service was so successful that on 9 December 1878 the Adelaide and Suburban Tramway Company was able to open its North Adelaide line, satisfying a key proviso of the Act that it was to construct 10.8 miles (17.4 km) of track from Adelaide's city centre to the suburbs of Kensington and North Adelaide within two years; the goal for Kensington had been reached in May 1878. By 1907 the company owned 90 trams and 650 horses, and had its own tram factory at Kensington.

== Growth of the network ==
The network continued to be developed solely by private companies. The routes were laid to meet market demand and when services were introduced they were extremely popular. Eleven companies built lines between 1878 and 1883. (Note: The companies were as follows: Adelaide and Suburban Tramway Company (included Kensington, North Adelaide, East Adelaide, Maylands, Magill, Marryatville, Burnside, Walkerville, Hill Street); Adelaide, Unley and Mitcham Tramway Company; Adelaide & Hindmarsh Tramway Company (also to Henley Beach, and for a time, Grange); Port Adelaide, Queenstown, Alberton and Portland Estate Tramway Company; Adelaide and Goodwood Tramway Company (also to Clarence Park); Adelaide Prospect, Nailsworth and Enfield Tramway Company (Adelaide & Suburban Tramway Company from 1895); Adelaide and Hyde Park Tramway Company; Adelaide and Parkside Tramway Company (also to Glen Osmond); Glenelg, Brighton and Marino Tramway Company; Glenelg, New Glenelg and Somerton Tramway Company; Adelaide, Payneham and Paradise Tramway Company.) Three companies had failed before laying tracks; evidence suggests they were floated to encourage land speculation, as well as being a speculative investment themselves.

The South Australian Parliament subsequently passed legislation authorising other companies to build new lines. Some of the Acts provided for "steam or other power" in addition to horses. (Note: In this period the world's first operational electric tram service opened in Berlin (1881).)

Within six years of the first line being authorised, companies were operating the following lines:

- Adelaide to Kensington: June 1878
- Adelaide to North Adelaide: December 1878
- Port Adelaide to Albert Park (not connected with the lines radiating from Adelaide): 1879
- Adelaide to Mitcham and Hindmarsh: 1881
- Walkerville and Maylands: 1882
- Burnside, Prospect, Nailsworth, Enfield and Magill: 1883.

Another isolated route was opened from Glenelg to Brighton in 1883. (Note: Earlier (in 1879) a steam-hauled broad-gauge line had been opened from Marino, five miles to the south of Glenelg, passing through Brighton and terminating at Jetty Road, Glenelg. The line ran for most of its distance on the edge of scrubby sand hills fronting the beach. It closed after 15 months. In September 1883 two horse tram routes were built: one along the Brighton Road from Glenelg to Brighton, which lasted until February 1914, and another in the southern streets of Glenelg, which closed after 18 months. The South Australian Government did not purchase the assets of the Brighton company nor the Port Adelaide company.)

The Corporation of the City of Adelaide took responsibility for controlling the disparate services. By-laws imposed a speed limit of 8 mph (13 km/h).

By 1901 the horse tram companies had 74 miles (119 km) of tramlines, 162 cars and 1062 horses.

== Infrastructure ==
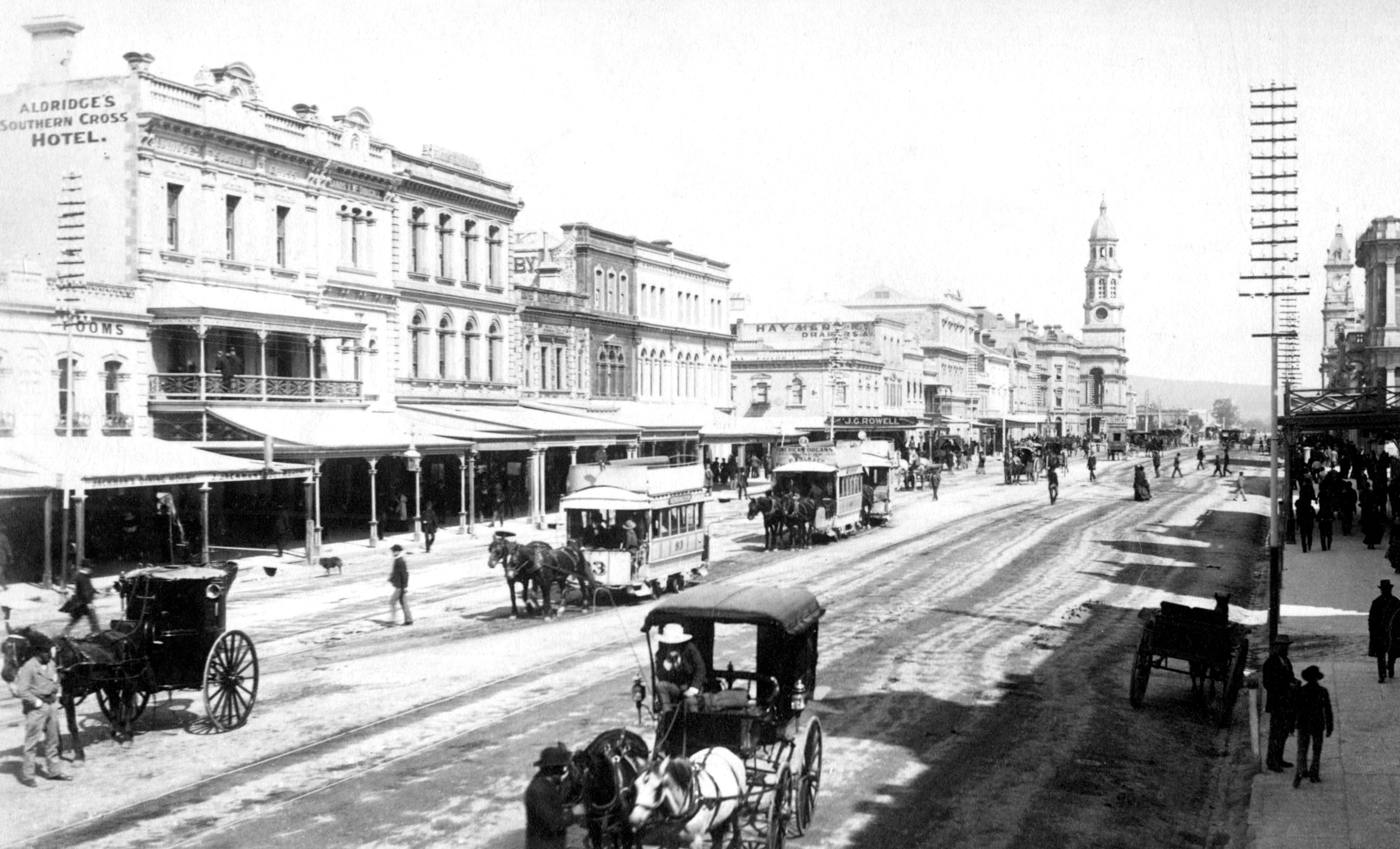
King William Street, Adelaide, circa 1885. Horse drawn-cabs, mainly in the middle, wait for fares as three horse trams seek refuge in a passing loop. Water carts, used to suppress dust, have not long passed.

In accordance with the horse tramway companies' enabling Acts, all lines were built to a gauge of 4 ft 8 1/2 ins (1435 mm standard gauge, except for the Port Adelaide to Albert Park line, which was built to 5 ft 3 ins (1600 mm) broad gauge to accommodate steam locomotives, all of which in the Adelaide area were to that gauge. (This line was also notable for having embankments to avoid swampy ground and flooding.)

Most streets at the time were unsealed, although some heavily trafficked roads were built with the macadam process. Regardless, the surfaces were made soft between the rails to aid the horses' traction. (Note: In the macadam process, invented in the early 19th century by John Loudon McAdam, single-sized crushed stone layers of small angular stones were placed as road base and compacted thoroughly. A later development was to add a binding layer of stone dust "set" with water to produce a stronger, smoother, less dusty and freer-draining pavement. Roads constructed in this manner were described as "macadamised". Late 19th century photos show that dust in Adelaide's main streets was further suppressed by frequent watering. A development later still was to spray tar on the surface to create "tar-bound macadam". Although that process involved bitumen it was only a predecessor of the more durable asphalt concrete process that is standard today, which was not introduced until the 1920s.) The condition of the streets – muddy in winter and dusty in summer – also militated against the introduction of street-level steam trains, which had started operating five years earlier: precursors to what became the Glenelg tram line service.

Various streets needed to be widened especially for tram lines, including Brougham Place, North Adelaide by 10 feet (3 m) and Prospect Road to a total width of 60 feet (18 m).

The route map in the infobox shows the horse tram network in the 1900s, when they were at their maximum extent. City-centred routes had termini at Henley Beach, Hindmarsh, Prospect, Nailsworth, Walkerville, Paradise, Magill, Burnside, Glen Osmond, Mitcham, Hyde Park and Clarence Park. Port Adelaide–Albert Park and Glenelg–Brighton were isolated lines.

Horse trams ran at an average speed of about 5 miles per hour (8 km/h), usually two horses pulling each tram from a pool of four to ten. However, the largest trams were hauled by three horses, especially when going up and down hills. Most of the companies operated double-deck trams with an enclosed saloon at the bottom and an open top deck, although some were single-decked. Many were built by the John Stephenson Company of New York, Duncan & Fraser of Adelaide, and from 1897 the largest of the companies, the Adelaide & Suburban Tramway Company, built its own at Kensington.

== Life on the horse trams ==
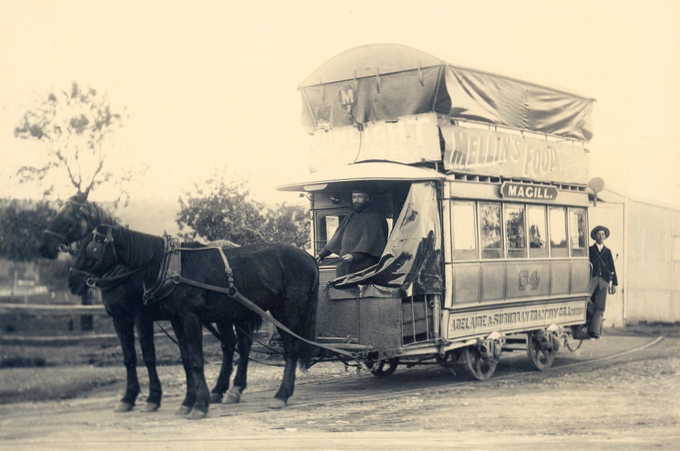
An Adelaide & Suburban Tramway Co. tram, probably at the Magill depot about 1880, showing how drivers and passengers were "protected" against rain and wind.

Horse tram drivers were to be at least 17 years old and conductors 12. The driver and conductor were not to be drunk. No smoking was permitted while on duty. When the hard roads began to trouble their feet, the tramway horses were sold to farmers, who, it was said, could only drive them by using a bell. It appears that the horses, which were trained by the companies and deployed for a few years, were well cared for; it did not pay the companies to do otherwise. Members of the public were not slow to rise in protest at the slightest hint of ill-treatment of the animals.

Horse tram crews were well known to passengers and other people along the lines. One man reminiscing about the Henley Beach line said:

Newspapers were individually delivered along the tram line, the conductor slinging them across the front fence or passing them on to the family dog trained to take delivery. Meat from a butcher [in Hindley Street, in the Adelaide retail centre] was delivered to the back doors of homes along the tram line. Businessmen often gave conductors their takings to bank in the city during the 20-minute layover. The linen bags, often containing £70 or £80, were thrown under the driver's stairs. Big cheques were also taken to the city, cashed at the bank, and the change taken down on the next run.

The layover was often hectic for the conductor, taking mails to the [Adelaide] General Post Office and collecting mails for delivery down the line, calling for prescriptions phoned in by doctors, and collecting cakes for delivery. The conductor made quite a bit for these deliveries. He would hop off the car before it stopped, dash up to the back door, pick up his waiting coin – threepence, sixpence or a shilling – plunk down the parcel and run back to his car.

It was not uncommon to find that a car, licensed to carry 16 passengers inside the saloon and 19 outside (i.e., 16 on the top deck and 3 on the front platform with the driver), would carry as many as 25 inside and more than 30 outside – about 60 per cent overloaded. To remonstrate with the driver about overloading was to no avail: he would take on passengers as long as he could pack them in.

Another inconvenience was the presence of dogs which were permitted in tram cars "to the great annoyance of persons inside" while the ever-present drunkard was "far more objectionable than a dog in a crowded vehicle".

The men who drove the cars were most "respectable and steady; their daily task [was] severe and protracted. "They worked from twelve to fourteen hours a day and had no special times for meals – they took them when they could. If they were off duty from sickness or any other cause, they had to "place a shilling for every trip made in their absence." They received a holiday every other Sunday and one week every year, the latter being a concession only introduced in 1881.

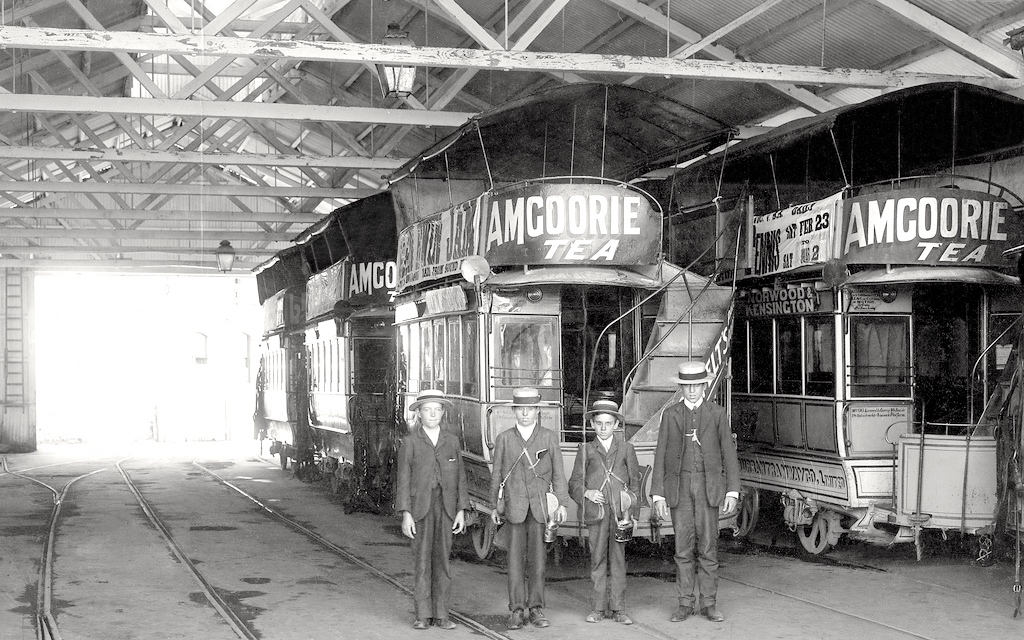
In 1905, when these young conductors were photographed with their ticketing equipment at the Adelaide and Suburban Tramway Company's Kensington depot, employment laws permitted 12-year-olds to work in that role.

Many youths from working-class families, some as young as 12, were employed as conductors. A newspaper editor remarked:

There are few boys who see as much of life as a tram boy. Take the early morning trams for instance. The working men go by these. Wife stands at the door with a half-dressed kid in her arms, other kids scrambling up the picket fence without much clothes on, and with a great deal of dirt on their faces... Most of these men carry their dinners with them in red handkerchiefs with perhaps the neck of a bottle of cold tea sticking out of their pockets. They mostly ride on the top of the car and they mostly smoke and spit .... About 9 o'clock the Government officers and clerks and shop people begin to move ... they read the newspapers and talk politics ... well-blackened briar-root pipes or mild cigarettes are all the go with these fellows. ... Inside the same car are probably several girls going to school. A lot of books tied round with a strap, a roll of music and perhaps a little velvet bag in gaudy colours, full of nothing. As for the schoolboys they mostly like to ride in front with the driver. ...

In the chaos of overcrowded cars, passengers often complained about the behaviour of young conductors. Identifying them could be difficult, however:

A sort of an attempt was made some time ago ... to put badges with numbers on their hats. However this regulation, if it be one, is observed only to a limited extent; many of the lads have no badges at all, and it is within our knowledge that the boys change badges and hats too at times – so that travelling on one car at different times of the day may ring the changes and baffle if not quite prevent positive identification.

== The end ==
Although they were modern at the time they were introduced, the horse trams in Adelaide soon became outdated: tramway technology was advancing rapidly to provide faster, higher-capacity, cleaner public transport. By the end of the 1880s steam tramways had opened in Sydney and cable tramways, followed by Australia's first electric tramway, in Melbourne. Adelaide stayed with horses and became the last Australian capital city to electrify.

By then, Adelaide's horse trams had come to be regarded by the public as a blot on the city's image. Slow speed and subsequent low traffic capacity made them inadequate, especially since the city's population had exceeded 160,000. The unsealed roads the horses needed became quagmires in winter and sources of dust in summer. The 10 pounds (4.5 kg) of manure each horse left behind daily was also not well regarded.

Although it became obvious that the time to convert the tramways to other forms of traction had come, none of the horse tramway companies was in a position to undertake the conversion from its own resources, especially following the sustained large-scale drought that started in 1895. (Note: Not all of the companies made a profit. The Adelaide & Hindmarsh Tramway Company, for example, had never paid a dividend in its operating life.) This was despite the companies being said to earn about 6 per cent interest, although the severe drought had by then reduced their income.

=== Electrification proposals ===
At the close of the century, Adelaide businessmen had been giving thought to the introduction of a system of electric tramways. The first scheme to appear was promoted by F.H. Snow on behalf of two London companies. Between September 1899 and June 1900 he made arrangements with the Adelaide and Suburban, Hindmarsh, Payneham and Paradise, Mitcham, and Hyde Park companies to bring them under one management by buying them out and giving their shareholders a prior right of reinvesting their purchase money in a new electric tramway company. Meanwhile, the Corporation of the City of Adelaide, unbeknown to Snow, had passed resolutions supporting a scheme of indirect municipalisation of the tramways submitted by W.J. Bingham. When the council finally made its approval of this scheme known, considerable controversy arose. Suburban councils were particularly upset that the corporation had not consulted them. However, attempts to promote municipal ownership of the tramways were doomed to failure since the councils would have been unable to raise the capital to purchase the existing horse tramway companies.

Socialists formed a Public Tramways League to promote nationalisation of the tramways. However, the electorate evidently considered that the state government should not own tramways, for the socialists had little success at subsequent elections. After much heated debate, the bill to authorise the Snow scheme was passed in parliament on 6 December 1901. In a referendum soon afterwards, the provisions of the Snow bill were overwhelmingly supported by local residents. However, the legislative proceedings had taken so long that the original source of capital for the scheme had been used on other projects, and financial stringency of the period put an end to any alternative support appearing. Consequently, the whole scheme collapsed.

=== Government takes over ===
Despite the outcome of the earlier referendum, public pressure for government ownership and electrification grew, and estimates of costs and income from increased patronage under electric systems were favourable. The government made several attempts to acquire the horse tramways between 1904 and 1906 but they were abortive.

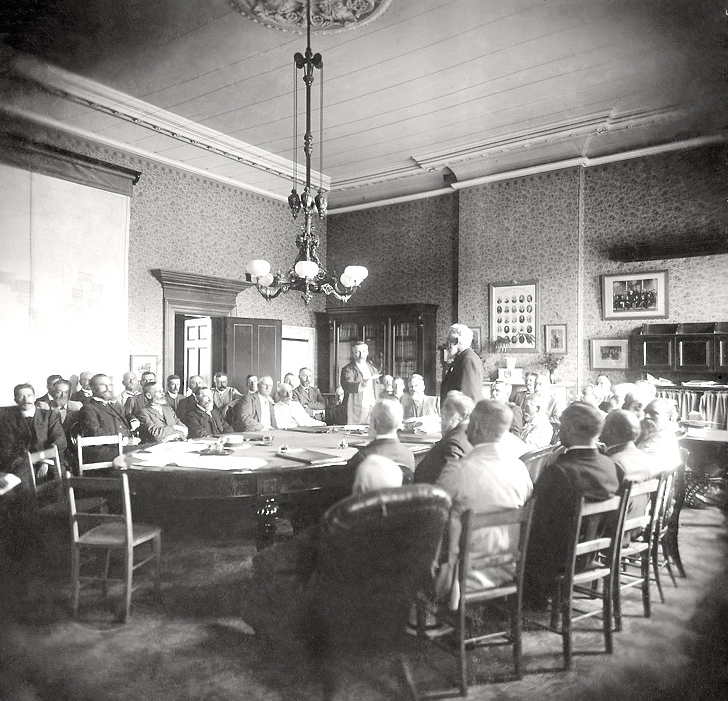
The South Australian state treasurer hands over a cheque paying for the assets of Adelaide's horse tram companies to a representative of the companies on 4 February 1907, the day before ownership by the MTT took effect.

Finally, the government decided to negotiate to purchase seven of the eleven horse tramway companies' assets – properties, plant and equipment – but not the companies themselves. An Act was tabled in the South Australian Parliament and assented to on 22 December 1906 "to authorise the Government to purchase certain tramways, and for the creation of a Municipal Tramways Trust to construct and work tramways, and for other purposes". The hand-over of assets, including 162 trams, (Note: The figure of 162 trams excludes an unknown quantity of Port Adelaide trams, which were included in the purchase and ran until 1914. The minor horse trams from Glenelg were not purchased.) 22 other vehicles and 1056 horses, took place on 4 February 1907 when the state treasurer presented a cheque for 280,372 pounds, 9 shillings and 3 pence (£280,372.9.3) to a representative of the companies in return for a receipt and the company title deeds. (Note: Based on the Retail Price Index calculated by the Australian Bureau of Statistics, 280,372 pounds in Australia in 1907 equates to approximately 41.4 million Australian dollars in 2018.) By 1909 at the launch of Adelaide's electric tram services there were 163 horse trams and 650 horses under the control of the MTT. The government funded the assets purchase by issuing treasury bills (Note: The Glenelg, Brighton and Marino Tramway Company's assets were not purchased; the company continued operating separately until its failure in 1914. (Kingsborough 1965 pp. 43–44.)) – an amount reduced, following a Supreme Court decision, from an asking price of £410,000.

=== Twilight period ===
Until the MTT had upgraded a line for electric services (which included construction of sturdier track), horse trams (and sometimes horse buses) ran from a horse car terminus to a temporary electric terminus. The horse tram service was then retired as the electrified infrastructure became operational. The first stages of electric services were mostly at the city end of each route.

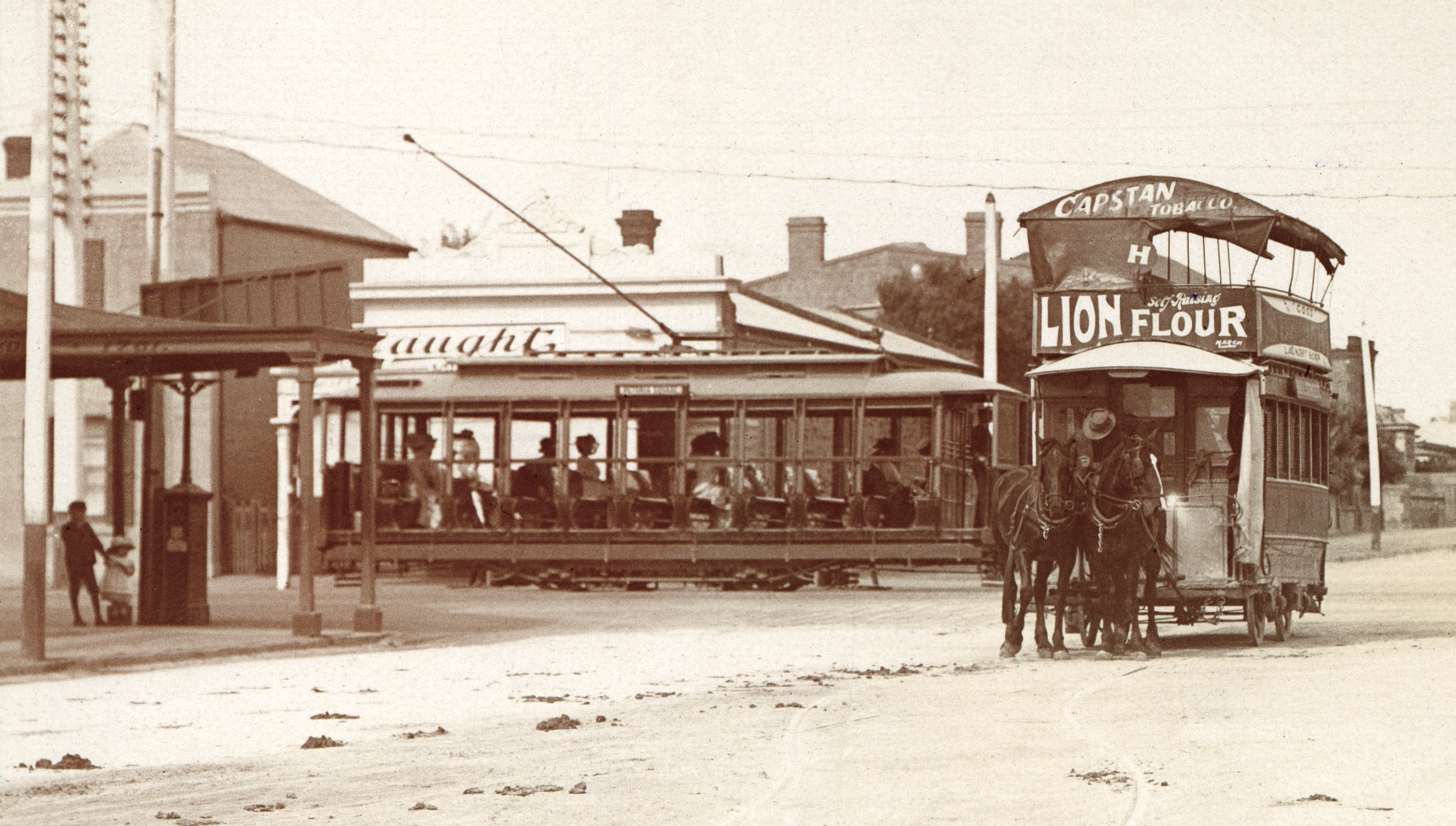
The MTT opened its electric tram service to North Adelaide in April 1909. Soon afterwards, a new "toast rack" electric tram advances up O'Connell Street. A 30-year-old horse tram, its lightweight construction evident, waits in Ward Street.

During the horse tram era, and especially during the twilight period, on some occasions when horse trams travelling in opposite directions met on single track, the car with the fewer passengers was derailed and pulled along the road – by horses and humans – to allow the other car to pass. As new tracks were completed for the electric trams but before electric infrastructure was erected, horse cars were authorised to run on them. When it became evident that the new tracks were more substantial, a local reviewer informed readers that male passengers who were periodically asked to re-rail horse cars when they left the tracks could be sure that derailments would not occur on the new tracks.

By December 1908 about half of the 87 km (54 mi) of new track due to be laid had been completed and driver training on electric trams was due to start on North Terrace. By the end of 1911 most of the tram system had been electrified. Lines were progressively opened to Kensington, North Adelaide, Walkerville, Payneham, Maylands, Marryatville, Parkside, Unley and Hyde Park. However, it was not until 24 October 1914 – seven years after the South Australian Government's purchase of the horse tram companies' assets – that electrification of the entire Adelaide-centric network was complete and horse-drawn services ceased. On the isolated Port Adelaide lines, horses continued to haul trams until 4 April 1917, when electrification was complete. Then, all the trams and the horses that hauled them, "which the Adelaide people are now making haste to forget", disappeared into history. The arrival of electric trams was the start of a new era:

How unhappy [were] the days when tired animals pulled abominably crowded vehicles (antiquities of a forgotten civilisation) around corkscrew hills and up long slopes to the tune of a vigorous whipping, and the sarcastic indignation of those on board. That regime of exhausted horses and exasperated passengers seems never to have existed, so familiar have become the glories of the new system. The people have won the splendid reward of waiting....

Links to other articles about Adelaide tramways, including those that followed the horse tram era, are accessible by clicking [show] in the panel at the beginning of this article.

== Gallery ==
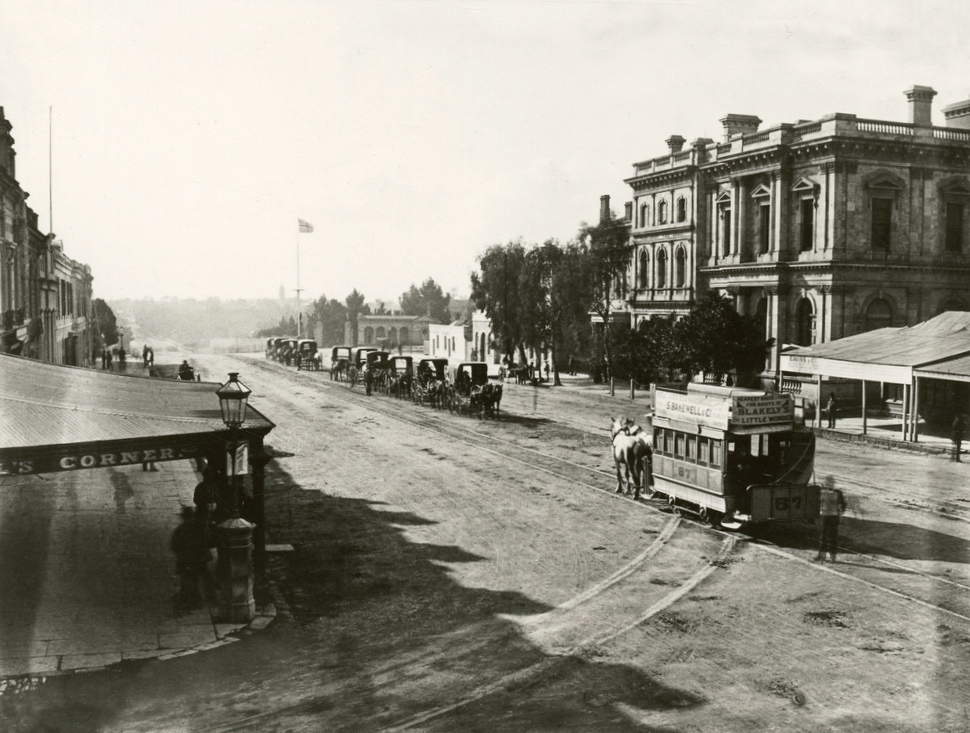
About 1880 : A late afternoon horse tram in King William Street; some of the 10 wagonettes will take passengers from it.

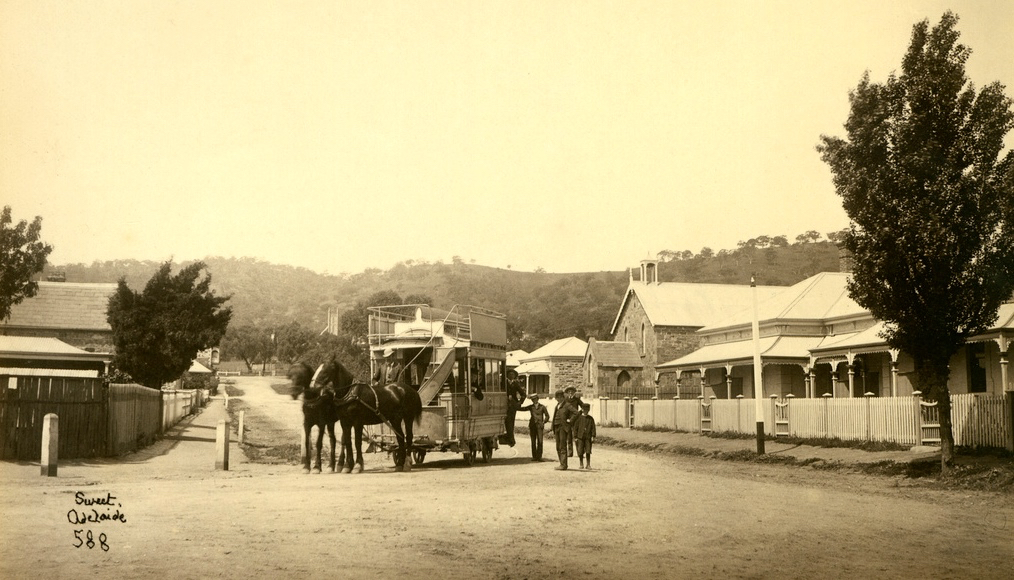
1885 : In the suburbs: turning from Albert Street into Welbourne Street near the end of the Mitcham route, 7.5 km from the city centre.

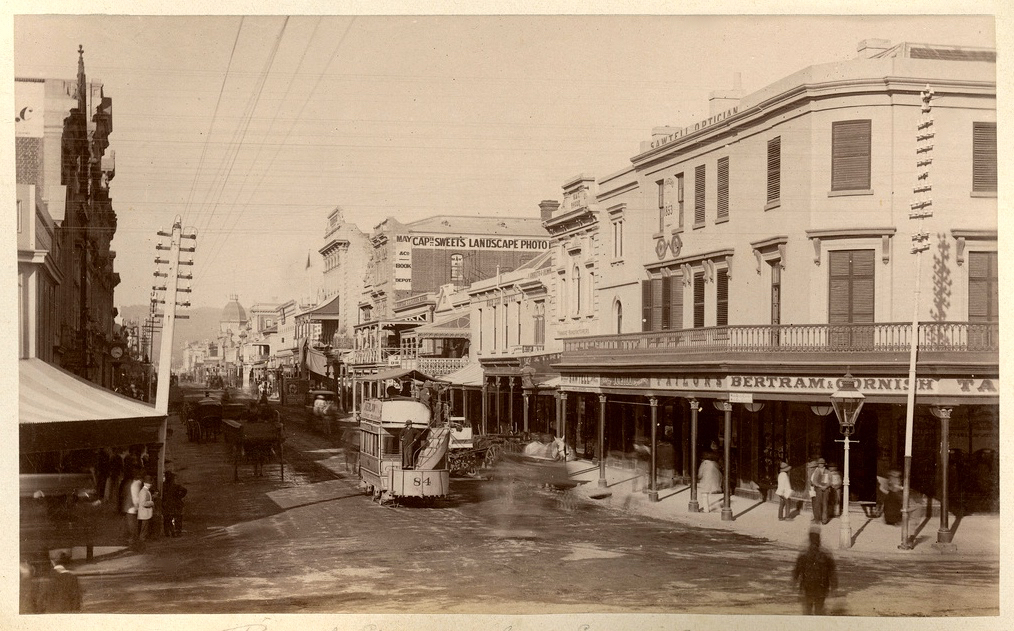
About 1900 : A horse tram at the intersection of King William Street and Rundle Street (now Rundle Mall).

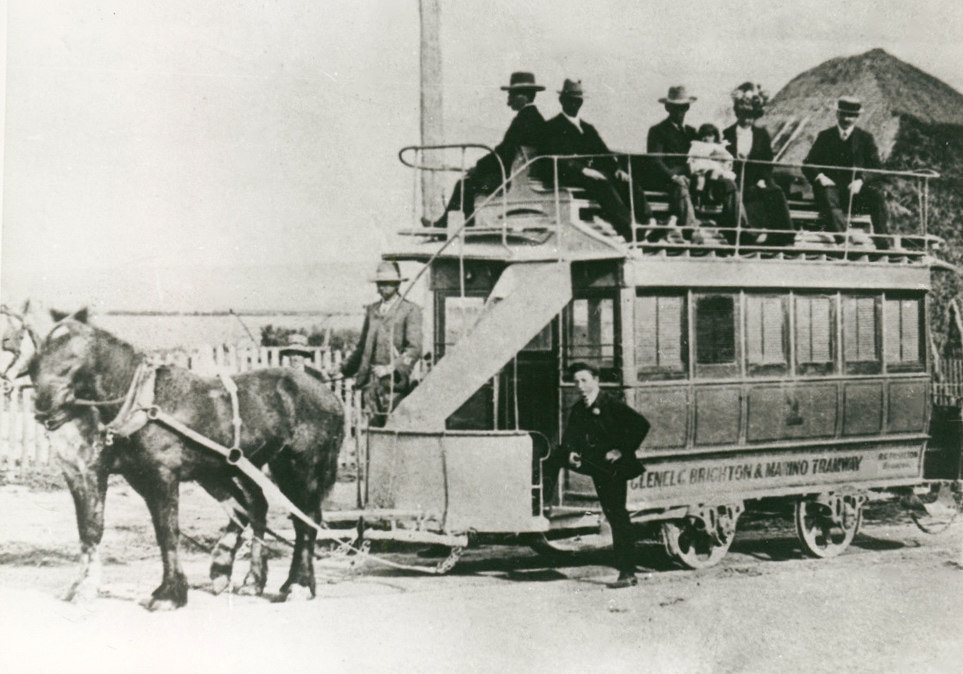
About 1905 : Trams of the Glenelg, Brighton & Marino Tramway ran near the coast; they did not serve central Adelaide.

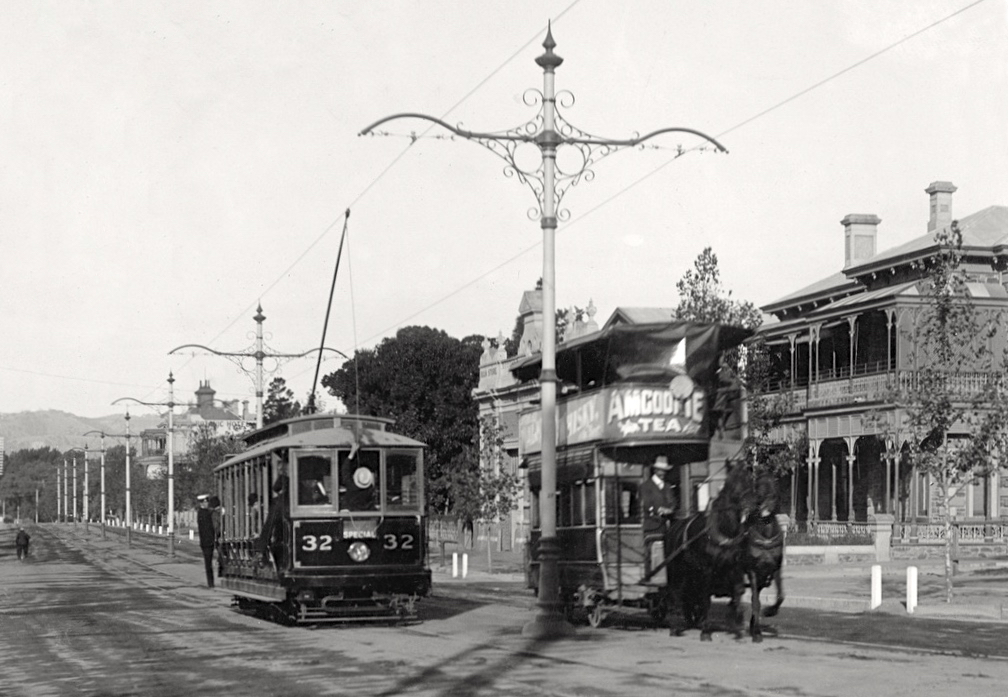
1909 : In North Terrace, a "toast rack" electric tram passes a horse tram running a service until its line was upgraded.

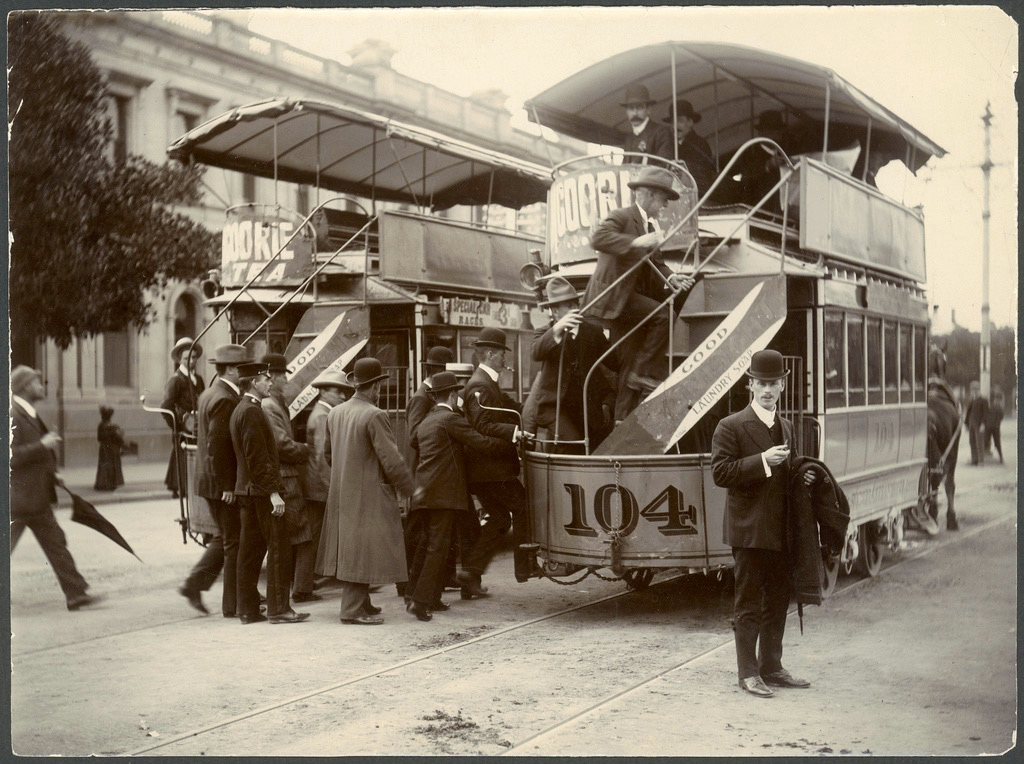
About 1909 : Outside the Government Offices in Wakefield Street, office workers board a tram after work. The other tram awaits Victoria Park race-goers.

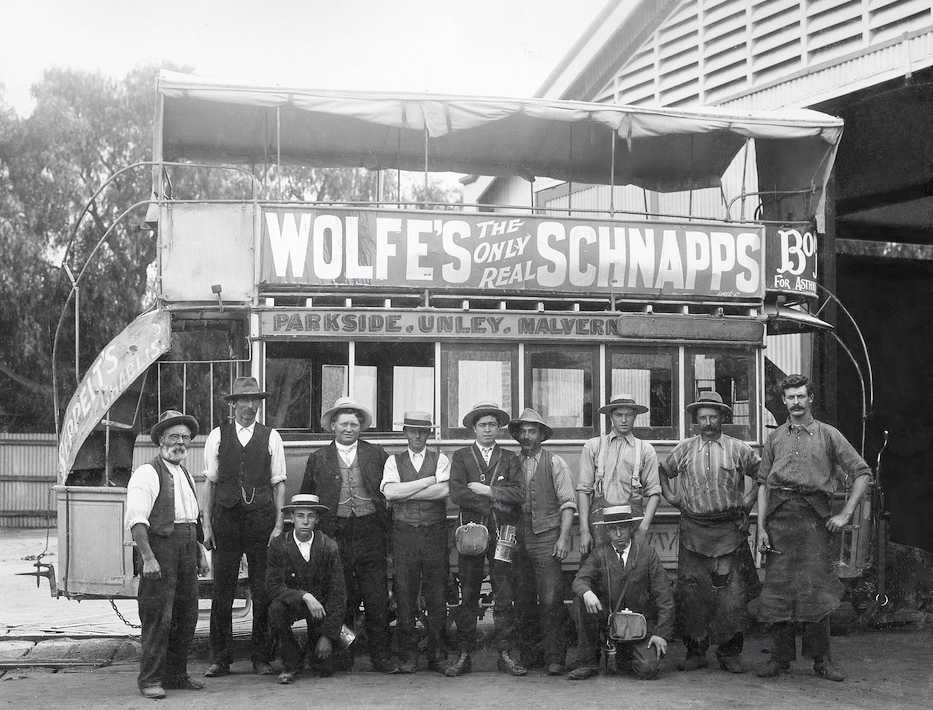
About 1910 : At the horse tram depot at Unley are 11 employees, some showing their tools of trade.

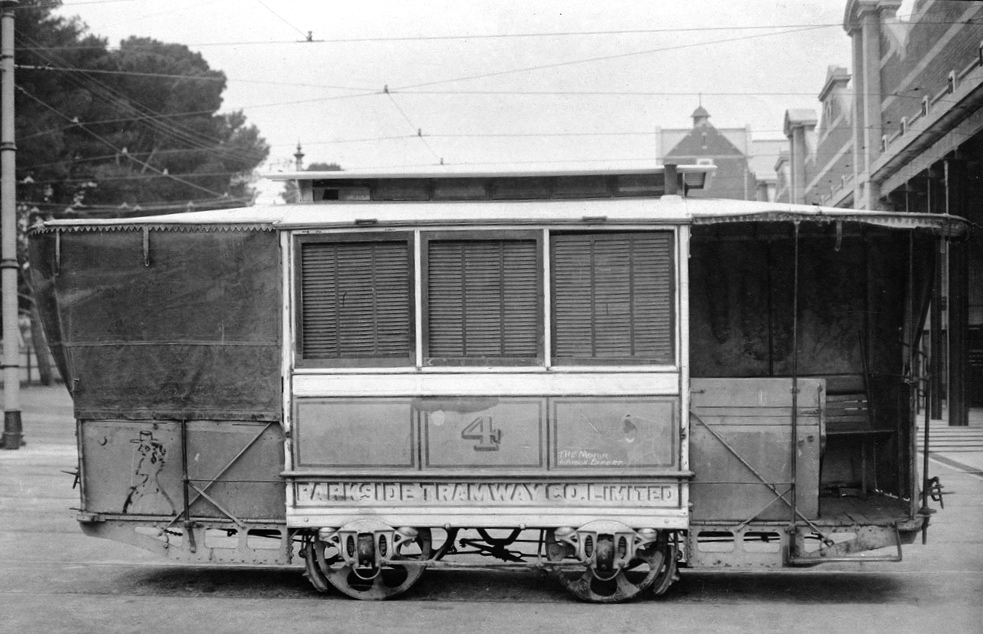
About 1915 : This single-deck car of the former Parkside Tramway Company, retained at the MTT's Hackney depot about 1915, was among the smallest of Adelaide's horse trams.

== See also ==
- Transport in Adelaide
- Transport in South Australia
- Municipal Tramways Trust
- Henwood v Municipal Tramways Trust
- List of public transport routes in Adelaide
- Trams in Australia
