= Cecil Herbert Sharpley =

Australian trade unionist and apostate (1908–1985)

- Born: 3 November 1908; Mangotsfield, Gloucestershire, England
- Died: 6 July 1985 (aged 76)
- Education: Weymouth College
- Occupations: Trade unionist; apostate
- Political party: Communist Party of Australia (1935–1948)

Cecil Herbert Sharpley (3 November 1908 – 6 July 1985) was an English-born Australian trade unionist, former executive member of the Communist Party of Australia, and communist party apostate.

== Early life ==
Sharpley was born on 3 November 1908 at Mangotsfield, Gloucestershire, England, the fifth child of clergyman Arthur Henry Sharpley and Cecilia Lucy Chambers (née Stubbs). He was educated at Weymouth College. He left England for Australia in 1928, with the costs funded by the Big Brother Movement.

== Trade union activities ==
In Victoria, Sharpley befriended priest William Hancock (1863–1955). Sharpley began working on a farm, but soon became homeless. He undertook a correspondence course in journalism. Sharpley then read books on socialism, Lenin and Marx, and submitted articles to Sydney's Morning Herald and other newspapers. He learned about politics and economics in the State Library Victoria. He got a job in an advertising agency in 1933, and joined the Federated Clerks' Union of Australia and the Australian Labor Party the following year.

In 1935, Sharpley joined the Communist Party of Australia (CPA). He became a member of the Victorian executive, and when the party was declared illegal, he established an illegal press and printing of the party's Guardian. He continued to meet in secret in 1941, and in a later inquiry, admitted a leading article represented the party policy to support the Soviet Union and defeat the Menzies Government. During this period he became a member of the Federated Ironworkers' Association of Australia, and worked in the Williamstown Naval Dockyard. In 1943, Sharpley ran a campaign for the Legislative Assembly seat of Footscray, managed by a young George Seelaf. Receiving 19.2 percent of the primary vote, he was unsuccessful.

=== Denouncement and royal commission ===
On 21 December 1948, Sharpley left the CPA and fled to Shepparton. To denounce the party, he worked with journalists of The Herald on a seven-article long investigative journalism piece on the CPA, accusing them of election fraud, with the first being published on 16 April 1949 on the front page. He then was subject to writs for libel in April 1949. A Movietone newsreal was also screened throughout Victoria on Wednesday 27 April 1949 of the Herald's chief of staff interviewing Sharpley. For writing the articles, Sharpley later admitted he was to be paid £700 (equivalent to A$58,000 in 2020), and had living expenses also met during the writing period.

Sharpley felt he was subject to smear campaigns, and was subject to heckling during the 1949–1950 Victorian Royal Commission Inquiring into the Origins, Aims, Objects and Funds of the Communist Party in Victoria and Other Related Matters. Part of his claims included union ballot rigging from 1937 over twelve years.

Sharpley stated in September 1949 he was going to write a book of his experiences as a leader within the CPA, with greater material than the limitations binding the current Royal Commission where he had spent over 110 hours in the witness box. A former police officer also acted as a bodyguard for a period of time, paid by the Herald newspaper.

The Commission concluded in early March 1950 after 154 days; Sharpley giving evidence for twenty-eight days and questioned by fourteen counsels.

Earlier in May 1949 it was said by the Postmaster-General that the Herald articles were drawn from imagination and not objective, and one witness during the inquiry also saying Sharpley's evidence was "imaginary". After a report by Justice Charles Lowe was published following the Commission, Sharpley's evidence was found unreliable.

== Later life ==
On 9 May 1938, he married machinist Veronica Theresa Connolly in Melbourne. They went to live in Gilbert Street, West Preston, and by April 1949, she sought a maintenance order of £2 a week, where he had "told her on numerous occasions to get out", which was dismissed in September 1949.

In May 1949, Sharpley wrote a twenty-eight page booklet I was a communist leader of his experiences as a CPA Victorian executive, a "ruthless indictment of Communism and of the party's plans to wreck Australia". It experienced strong initial sales.

With his father dying three years prior, he indicated in November 1949 he was seeking to visit his aging 84-year-old mother. On 19 December 1949, he returned to England without his wife, finding a job as an insurance salesman. He also became a Christian.

He died on 6 July 1985, of a coronary occlusion at Islington, aged 76.

== Bibliography ==
- Sharpley, C. H. (Cecil H.) (1952). The great delusion : the autobiography of an ex-communist leader / Cecil H. Sharpley.London: Heinemann.
