= Wilfred Fullagar =

Australian judge (1892–1961)

The Honourable Sir Wilfred Fullagar KBE QC

Justice of the High Court of Australia
- In office 8 February 1950 – 9 July 1961
- Nominated by: Robert Menzies
- Preceded by: Sir Hayden Starke
- Succeeded by: Sir William Owen

Judge of the Supreme Court of Victoria
- In office 1 August 1945 – 8 February 1950

Personal details
- Born: 16 November 1892 Malvern, Victoria, Australia
- Died: 9 July 1961 (aged 68) East Melbourne, Victoria, Australia

Sir Wilfred Kelsham Fullagar (16 November 1892 – 9 July 1961) was an Australian judge who served on the High Court of Australia from 1950 until his death in 1961. He had earlier served on the Supreme Court of Victoria from 1945 to 1950, and had previously been considered one of Melbourne's leading barristers.

== Early life ==
Fullagar was born on 16 November 1892 in Malvern, Melbourne. He was the oldest of three children and only son born to Sarah Elizabeth (née Law) and Thomas Kelsham Fullagar. His father was a merchant. Fullagar was educated at Haileybury College before matriculating to the University of Melbourne in 1910. He boarded at Ormond College, graduating Bachelor of Laws in 1915.

In October 1916, while undertaking his articles of clerkship, Fullagar enlisted in the Australian Imperial Force (AIF). He served in France with the 7th Field Artillery Brigade, ending the war with the rank of sergeant. He studied law in England for six months in 1919, during which time he married Marion Lovejoy. The couple returned to Australia in January 1920 and had five sons together.

Although Fullagar aspired to become a barrister, he considered it a financially risky move and instead began working with the Repatriation Department and Commonwealth Immigration Service. However, in 1922 he was admitted to the Victorian Bar after receiving financial assistance from John Latham and Owen Dixon. He was awarded the degree of Master of Laws by the University of Melbourne in 1925.

== Career at the Bar ==
Fullagar lectured at the University of Melbourne from 1923 to 1928, in tort and legal procedure. He would later return to lecture from 1943 to 1945 in Australian constitutional law. He made several appearances before the High Court, and in 1932 appeared in three cases argued before the Privy Council, including the inconspicuously named but significant Dried Fruits case, and Attorney-General (NSW) v Trethowan, the case that considered whether a referendum was necessary to abolish the Legislative Council of New South Wales. Fullagar was junior counsel in those cases to Sir William Jowitt, a future Lord Chancellor, and Sir John Latham, a future Chief Justice of Australia, respectively.

In 1933 he was made a King's Counsel and in 1938 he served as the vice-president of the Law Council of Australia. In 1942 he was appointed as a director of Argus & Australasian Limited, the company that owned The Argus newspaper. Also in that year he remarried, to Mary Taylor, his first wife having died in 1941.

== Judicial career ==
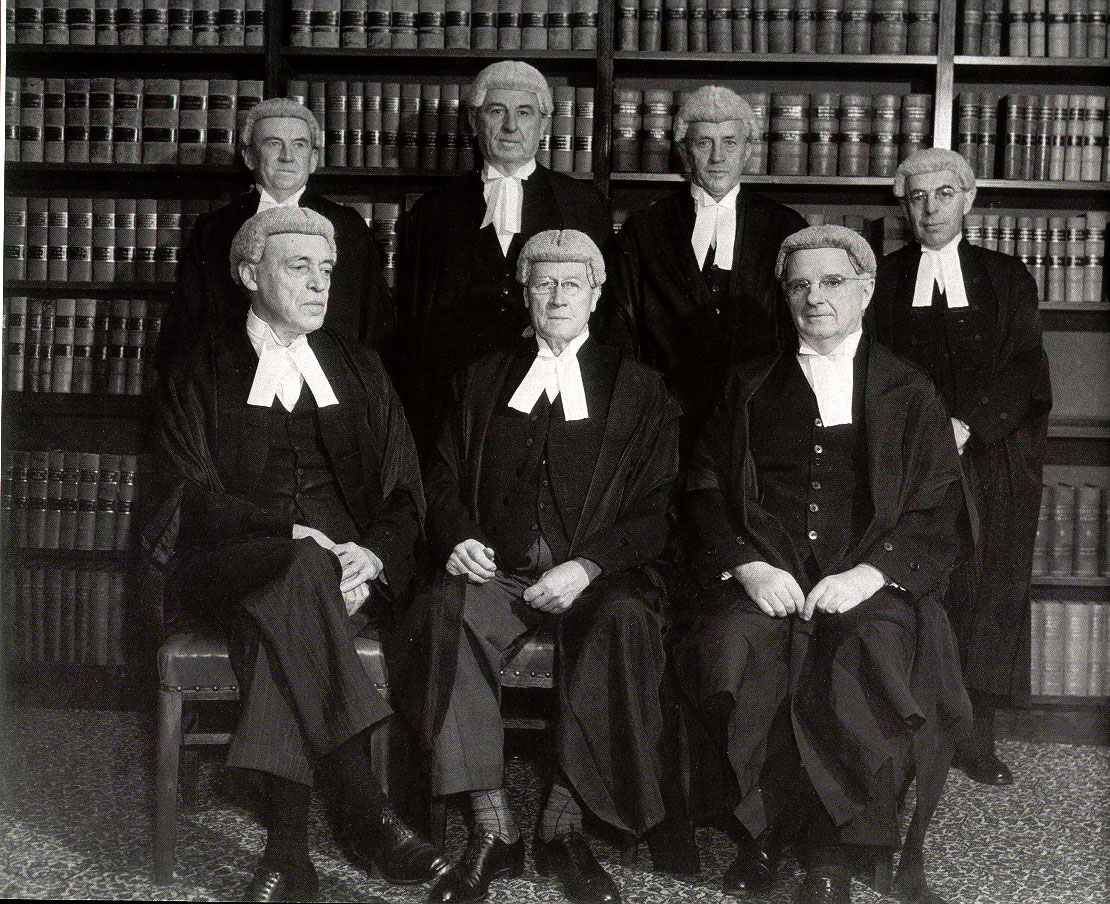
High Court in 1952, Fullagar at far left, back row.

On 1 August 1945 he was made a Judge of the Supreme Court of Victoria. He held that position until his appointment to the High Court on 8 February 1950, when he filled the vacancy left by the resignation of Sir Hayden Starke. Later that year he was made a Knight Commander of the Order of the British Empire. On the High Court, he came to be regarded as one of the greatest Australian judges of his generation. He contributed to the Australian High Court being considered in the 1950s as one of the leading appellate courts in the common law world, and many of his judgments in a variety of areas of law are still regarded as classics. Important cases on which he sat included Jackson v Goldsmith (1950) (where his dissenting judgment set out the law relating to issue estoppel), Australian Communist Party v Commonwealth (1951), Wilson v Darling Island Stevedoring (1956) (an influential exposition of the exceptions to privity of contract), Williams v Hursey (1959) (a trade union case arising from the ALP/DLP split) and Dennis Hotels Pty Ltd v Victoria (1960) (a constitutional case concerning excise duties).

Fullagar sat on the bench of the High Court until his death of a stroke on 9 July 1961. Tributes on his death included the following from then Chief Justice Sir Owen Dixon:

"His learning, the certainty of his grasp of legal principle and the width and profundity of his knowledge of the law are qualities which without more would have assured him a special position not only among his colleagues but among all who are concerned in the work of the law. But it was his fortune to combine a most lovable nature with which won a place in the hearts of all of us with a powerful intelligence, clear and strong, yet at the same time calm and deliberate in its processes."

US Supreme Court Justice Felix Frankfurter (writing to Dixon) said:

"The Times brings me the shocking news of Fullagar's death. ... So close was my professional communion with Fullagar, solely through the printed page, that I feel his death as a personal loss, though I never – to my great regret – laid eyes on him."

In the course of his judgment in Scruttons Ltd v Midland Silicones Ltd [1962] AC 446, Viscount Simonds of the House of Lords stated, in reference to the judgment of the then late Fullagar J in Wilson v Darling Island Stevedoring and Lighterage Co Ltd (1956) 95 CLR 43:

"In that case, in which the facts are not in any material respect different from those in the present case, the late Mr. Justice Fullagar delivered a judgment with which the Chief Justice, Sir Owen Dixon, said that he entirely agreed. So do I—with every line and every word of it, and, having read and reread it with growing admiration, I cannot forbear from expressing my sense of the loss which not only his colleagues in the High Court of Australia but all who anywhere are concerned with the administration of the common law have suffered by his premature death.”

More recently, former Chief Justice of the High Court, Sir Anthony Mason has written of Fullagar J that he was "unquestionably an outstanding lawyer … His judgments were uniformly of very high quality, and his reputation was second only to that of Dixon J himself.”

== See also ==
- Judiciary of Australia
- High Court of Australia
- List of Judges of the Supreme Court of Victoria
- Victorian Bar Association
