= Henwood v Municipal Tramways Trust =

Judgement of the High Court of Australia

Henwood v Municipal Tramways Trust (SA)
- Court: High Court of Australia
- Decided: 30 June 1938
- Citations: [1938] HCA 35, (1938) 60 CLR 438

Case history
- Prior action: [1937] SASR 390
- Appealed from: Supreme Court (SA)

Court membership
- Judges sitting: Latham CJ, Starke, Dixon and McTiernan JJ

Henwood v Municipal Tramways Trust (SA), was a significant Australian court case, decided in the High Court of Australia on 30 June 1938. The case was an influential decision in the law of negligence and is an authority for the proposition that the unlawful act of the deceased did not absolve the Trust from civil liability for its negligence.

== Brief overview ==
Henwood, while riding the tram, was overcome by a fit of nausea and stuck his head out the window. This breached a bylaw made by the tram authority as a safety precaution, and he was struck twice by standards outside the tram.

== Ruling ==
It was held that although he was breaking the law, he was still under the protection of the law, and as such the Tramways Trust was liable for negligence in allowing him to be struck.

"It was there held that there is no general rule denying a person who is doing an unlawful act the protection of the general law imposing upon others duties of care for his safety."

This makes more sense when you look at another example, again mentioned by Finnegan P, of an occupier who shoots someone breaking into the house, such as Revill v Newbery, where the defendant shot the plaintiff who was breaking and entering. The defendant, or the occupier, was held liable for criminal damages, even though it was in defence of his home. In that case the plaintiff was also held liable for trespass.

== See also ==
- Municipal Tramways Trust
