= Simon Isaacs =

Australian barrister and judge (1905 – 1987)

Simon Isaacs QC

Judge of the Supreme Court of New South Wales
- In office 19 October 1964 – 9 April 1975

Personal details
- Born: 9 April 1905 London, England
- Died: 17 June 1987 (aged 82) Sydney, Australia
- Spouse: Maria Israel (m. 1929)
- Education: University of Sydney

Simon Isaacs QC (9 April 1905 – 17 June 1987) was an Australian barrister and judge. He served on the Supreme Court of New South Wales from 1964 to 1975.

== Early life ==
Isaacs was born in London on 9 April 1905. He was one of five children of Herman and Elizabeth Isaacs, Dutch Jews from "impoverished families" who had arrived in England in the 1890s and worked as domestic servants.

Isaacs spent his early years in Edmonton and Hackney. His father immigrated to Australia in 1910 and the rest of the family joined him in Sydney in 1914. He was educated at Bourke Street Public School in Surry Hills and Hurstville Public School, before winning a scholarship to attend Sydney Boys' High School. He went on to study law at the University of Sydney, graduating Bachelor of Laws with first-class honours.

== Legal career ==
Isaacs practised as a solicitor for six years before being admitted to the New South Wales Bar in 1934. He "practised extensively in common law, Commonwealth industrial law and criminal law".

In 1948 Isaacs appeared for Jock Garden in the royal commission chaired by G. C. Ligertwood into the New Guinea timber scandal. Garden, a former federal MP and convicted fraudster, had alleged corruption on the part of government minister Eddie Ward. Isaacs and Ward came into conflict over allegations Isaacs repeated during the trial, with Ward publicly labelling Isaacs a liar and Prime Minister Ben Chifley making unfavourable remarks of Isaacs in federal parliament, leading to a protest by the New South Wales bar council. Ward subsequently reported Isaacs to the bar council for misprofessional conduct, with an investigation clearing him of any wrongdoing.

Isaacs was appointed King's Counsel in 1950. In the same year he represented five trade unions in Australian Communist Party v Commonwealth, appearing alongside H. V. Evatt as they successfully challenged the Menzies government's attempt to ban the Communist Party.

In 1964, Isaacs was appointed to the Supreme Court of New South Wales. He retired from the court in 1975. In 1979, Premier Neville Wran appointed Isaacs to lead an inquiry into logging at Terania Creek.

== Personal life ==
In 1929, Isaacs married Maria "Ria" Israel, with whom he had four children. They settled in Strathfield in 1942. He died in Sydney on 17 June 1987, aged 82.

Isaacs was active in Sydney's Jewish community as a board member of the Great Synagogue and a founding member of the Strathfield Synagogue in western Sydney. He was also treasurer of the Sir Moses Montefiore Home.
