= W. R. Boyce Gibson =

British-Australian philosopher (1869–1935)

William Ralph Boyce Gibson (15 March 1869 – 2 April 1935) was a British-Australian philosopher. He was an advocate of personal idealism.

== Biography ==
He was born in Paris, the son of Reverend William Gibson, a Methodist minister and his wife Helen Wilhelmina, daughter of William Binnington Boyce.

He married Lucy Judge Peacock in 1898; they had five children including Alexander Boyce Gibson, Ralph Siward Gibson and Quentin Boyce Gibson.

In 1911 he was appointed to the chair of mental and moral philosophy at the University of Melbourne, a position he held until his retirement in 1934.

Gibson died in Surrey Hills, Victoria.

== Selected publications ==
- A Philosophical Introduction to Ethics (1904)
- Rudolf Eucken's Philosophy of Life (1906)
- The Problem of Logic (1908, 1914)
- God with Us: A Study in Religious Idealism (1909)

== Sources ==
- "Gibson, William Ralph Boyce," Who Was Who, A & C Black, 1920–2008; online edition, Oxford University Press, Dec. 2007, accessed 31 Jan. 2012.
