= The Herald (Melbourne) =

Newspaper of Melbourne, Victoria, Australia

- Type: Daily newspaper
- Format: Broadsheet
- Owner: News Limited (1987–1990)
- Founder: George Cavenagh
- Founded: 3 January 1840
- Ceased publication: 5 October 1990
- Language: English
- Headquarters: 44–74 Flinders Street (1925–1990)
- City: Melbourne
- Country: Australia
- Sister newspapers: The Sun
- ISSN: 2206-2440

The Herald was a morning and, later, evening broadsheet newspaper published in Melbourne, Australia, from 3 January 1840 to 5 October 1990. It later merged with its sister morning newspaper The Sun News-Pictorial to form the Herald-Sun.

== Founding ==
The Port Phillip Herald was first published as a semi-weekly newspaper on 3 January 1840 from a weatherboard shack in Collins Street. It was the fourth newspaper to start in Melbourne.

The paper took its name from the region it served. Until its establishment as a separate colony in 1851, the area now known as Victoria was a part of New South Wales and it was generally referred to as the Port Phillip district.

Preceding it was the short-lived Melbourne Advertiser which John Pascoe Fawkner first produced on 1 January 1838 as hand-written editions for 10 weeks and then printed for a further 17 weekly issues, the Port Phillip Gazette and The Port Phillip Patriot and Melbourne Advertiser. But within eighteen months of its inauguration, the Port Phillip Herald had grown to have the largest circulation of all Melbourne papers.

It was founded and published by George Cavenagh (1808–1869). He was born in India, as the youngest son of a Major. He came to Sydney in March 1825 where he worked as a magistrates’ clerk and farmer, before eventually taking on the role of editor of the Sydney Gazette in 1836.

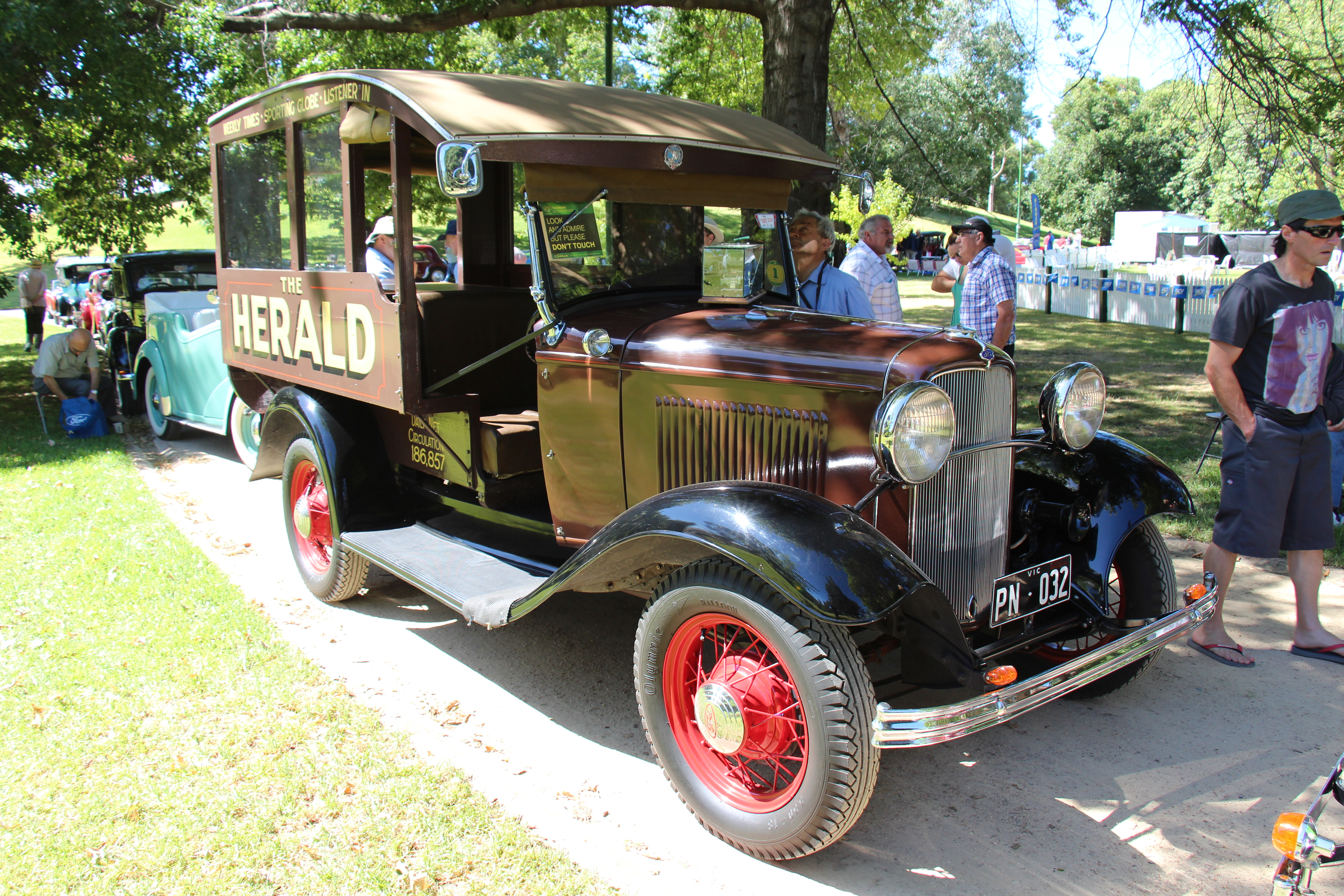
1932 newspaper delivery truck.

Bringing his wife and eight children, his staff and machinery to Melbourne, Cavenagh first produced the Port Phillip Herald as free editions. Later copies were to sell for sixpence. Subscriptions could be taken out for ten shillings per quarter. The newspaper came out twice a week, on Wednesday and Saturday.

== Original staff ==
The paper opened with the adopted motto "impartial – but not neutral", which was to run under its masthead for 50 years.

It was edited by William Kerr (1812–1859) who left Cavenagh in 1841 to be editor of the Port Phillip Patriot and Melbourne Advertiser and then on to the Port Phillip Gazette about a decade later.

The editor who followed Kerr at the Port Phillip Herald was Thomas Hamilton Osborne (c. 1805–1853) who later became proprietor of The Portland Mercury and Port Fairy Register (originally known as The Portland Mercury and Normanby Advertiser) on 10 January 1844.

Edmund Finn worked as the star reporter on The Herald for thirteen years. He arrived in Melbourne on 19 July 1841 and he joined the newspaper's staff in 1845.

Under George Cavenagh's leadership the paper would denounce adversaries, challenge ideas, and employ negative emotive language in an astute invective manner. In the early 1840s this was manifest in dealing with Judge John Walpole Willis which resulted in severe fines being imposed on Cavenagh. It was an editorial policy that often involved litigation and Cavenagh was defendant in the first civil libel case in the colony. He retired in 1853, returned briefly the next year, and then retired permanently in 1855.

== Daily ==
On 1 January 1849, the Port Phillip Herald changed its name to The Melbourne Morning Herald and General Daily Advertiser. It also upped its printing schedule from thrice-weekly to daily. The Argus, which would not yet be a daily until 18 June 1849, scorned its rival's change of schedule with this report on 2 January 1849:

The commencement of 1849 seems likely to prove an era of some moment, in the annals of the Port Phillip Press. On the one hand we are summoned to attend the funeral of a noxious little publication, with which we have been bored for a few months of a Thursday evening, and are daily expecting a summons for a similar purpose, from a contemporary even more troublesome, from being just as stupid and a little more frequent. On the other hand we have the still more melancholy duty of waiting upon the birth of a new daily, and it is with but a blank heart, we look forward to the trebled evils attendant upon a trebled issue of so mischievous a publication as the Port Phillip Herald. We are entire disbelievers in the daily publication of such a paper, till yesterday when the first dose reached us, and most sincerely do we condole with the public, upon the deluge of papers with which this province is to be inundated, till that happy day when a Daily Argus will rush in to the rescue, and effectually settle the quarrel as to which of the present Dailies goes to the wall, by quietly finding them a wall a piece. Thank Heaven that day is not far distant.

For twenty years from 1854, a succession of owners struggled to keep the newspaper afloat during the goldrush period. This included two years in which it was reduced to a biweekly. The newspaper changed its name several times before settling on The Herald from 8 September 1855 – the name it held for the next 135 years. In 1869 it developed stability as an evening daily.

== Twentieth century ==
The Herald was the home of many journalists and cartoonists, including Samuel Garnet Wells, Tess Lawrence, Lawrence Money, and William Ellis Green, whose Grand Final caricatures were a feature of Melbourne life for decades. C. J. Dennis served as staff poet from 1922 to his death in 1938. Cartoonist John Frith (c. 1908–2000) spent 18 years at the paper from 1950 to 1969. Theatre critics included Harry A. Standish ("H.A.S"). Standish was chairman of the Erik Award ("Eriks") judging panel.

The Herald, with its sister publications such as The Weekly Times, expanded and in 1921 a new headquarters was built in Flinders Street, designed by the successful commercial architects HW & FB Tompkins. The building was expanded in 1928, and all the papers were printed and distributed from here until 1991.

In 1949, Cecil Herbert Sharpley—after leaving the Communist Party of Australia (CPA)—worked together with The Herald on a seven-article long investigative piece on the CPA, accusing them of election fraud. A report by Charles Lowe found much of Sharpley's evidence unreliable.

In February 1987, The Herald was included in the sale of The Herald and Weekly Times to News Limited.

== Closure ==
The Herald ceased publication on 5 October 1990 and merged with sister morning newspaper The Sun News-Pictorial to form the Herald-Sun, which contained columns and features from both of its predecessors.
