= White Australia Party v Commonwealth =

Ongoing High Court of Australia legal case

- Court: High Court of Australia
- Full case name: White Australia Party Inc. & Anor v The Commonwealth of Australia & Anor
- Started: 18 May 2026 (application for writ)
- Decided: Pending (heard September 2026)
- Transcripts: [2026] HCASJ 15, [2026] HCASJ 17

Court membership
- Judges sitting: Justice Jayne Jagot (May); Chief Justice Stephen Gageler (June)

Area of law
- Constitutional law, Implied freedom of political communication, Separation of powers

White Australia Party v Commonwealth is an ongoing legal case before the High Court of Australia. It consists of a challenge by the White Australia Party against federal hate speech laws, particularly the part of those laws that grant the executive government the power to proscribe an organisation.

== Background ==
The National Socialist Network (NSN) was a prominent neo-Nazi group in Australia. Some NSN organisers sought to register a federal political party with the Australian Electoral Commission (AEC), and formed the White Australia Party (WAP). The WAP claimed in April 2026 to have 1,779 members, sufficient for federal electoral registration. Home affairs minister Tony Burke claimed that this membership list was largely the same as the NSN's.

Following the Bondi Beach shooting, an Islamic terror attack on Jewish Australians in December 2025, the federal government passed new laws which included the power to proscribe organisations as hate groups. Proscribing an organisation means that individuals who are members of the organisation or otherwise work to support it may be charged with a range of serious criminal offences. In order to be proscribed, the responsible minister must be satisfied that the group has committed or is associated with a hate crime. However, the new laws are also clear that no crime needs to have actually been committed, and the discretionary power of the minister is therefore broad. In May 2026, the White Australia Party was the second group included on the list of proscribed organisations.

== Legal challenge ==
The WAP's barrister is former Liberal MP Peter King, who was obliged to take the brief under the cab-rank rule. On 15 May 2026, the WAP and its National President, Thomas Sewell, commenced proceedings in the original jurisdiction of the High Court against the Commonwealth. The plaintiffs' lawyers lodged an interlocutory application late on a Friday afternoon, seeking to restrain the operation of the proscription on an ex parte basis, without notice to the Commonwealth. Jagot J declined to deal with the application on that basis, holding it was "untenable" for the Court to restrain a law from coming into force without the proposed defendants first being given adequate notice and an opportunity to be legally represented.

=== WAP argument ===
In its writ, the WAP argued that the proscription mechanism introduced by the Combatting Antisemitism, Hate and Extremism (Criminal and Migration Laws) Act 2026 (Cth) into Part 5.3B of the Criminal Code is constitutionally invalid on three grounds.

==== Inconsistency with precedent ====
First, the WAP argued that the proscription mechanism is practically identical to the Communist Party Dissolution Act 1950 (Cth), which the High Court held invalid in Australian Communist Party v Commonwealth. In that case, the Court held that Parliament could not conclusively enact its own opinion (that an organisation was subversive) as though that opinion were an established fact triggering the exercise of legislative power. It found a genuine factual foundation for the exercise of a head of Commonwealth power had to actually exist, and could not be substituted by parliamentary say-so. The WAP contends the 2026 scheme suffers the same defect, allowing the Executive to proscribe an organisation as a "prohibited hate group" by ministerial specification, rather than through a judicial or otherwise independently-tested finding of fact.

==== Incompatibility with implied freedom of political communication ====
Second, the WAP argued that the proscription regime infringes upon the implied freedom of political communication. The WAP contends that criminalising membership of, or association with, a proscribed organisation burdens communication on governmental and political matters in a manner that is not reasonably appropriate and adapted to a legitimate end compatible with the system of representative and responsible government prescribed by the Constitution.

==== Violation of separation of powers ====
Third, the WAP argued that the regime violates the separation of judicial power required by Chapter III of the Constitution, by vesting a punitive power in the Executive. On this ground, the WAP contends that specifying an organisation as a prohibited hate group amounts to the Executive determining criminal guilt or exacting punishment, a function the Constitution confers exclusively on courts exercising judicial power.

=== Commonwealth argument ===
The Commonwealth argues that its power to make the laws comes from the external affairs power, and the laws implement the Commonwealth's treaty obligations that require it to prohibit advocacy of racial hatred and ban organisations that "promote and incite racial discrimination".

=== Proceedings ===
On 3 June 2026, Chief Justice Gageler declined to grant an interlocutory injunction suspending the operation of the proscription regime pending the substantive hearing, which is listed before the Full Court for hearing in September 2026.

== Commentary ==
=== Legal ===
Constitutional scholar Anne Twomey observed the result would be "far more consequential than the existence of the White Australia Party" and that the "decision may be vital in preventing the misuse of such powers by a future authoritarian government as a means of banning opposition groups or parties."

Legal academic Anthony Gray stated that "it's easy to defend freedom of speech for people whose views are what we call reasonable or views with which we agree". Gray said that he expected the Commonwealth to attempt to re-draft the legislation if the WAP was successful.

=== Political ===
In May 2026 Prime Minister Anthony Albanese stated he was confident the new hate speech laws would withstand the White Australia Party's legal challenge.
