= George Seelaf =

Australian unionist

George Seelaf AM
- Born: 4 March 1914; Albert Park, Victoria, Australia
- Died: 9 August 1988 (aged 74); Melbourne, Victoria, Australia
- Occupations: Trade unionist and activist
- Organization: Australasian Meat Industry Employees Union
- Political party: Labor (1939-1940); Communist (1942-1973)
- Spouse: Edna Mary McMillan (married 1938)
- Children: 1

George Seelaf AM (4 April 1914 - 9 August 1988) was an Australian unionist and activist.

== Early life and family ==
Seelaf was born in Albert Park, the eldest child of George Seelaf, an Estonian labourer at the Port of Melbourne, and Janet Rachel, who was born in Victoria. At three years old, his family moved to Footscray, where he would remain for the rest of his life. He was educated at Hyde Street Primary School and Williamstown High School. Leaving school at the age of thirteen, Seelaf lived the next decade in varying states of employment, including a brief stint at a canister-making factory in South Melbourne, and working at his father's market garden in Lyndhurst.

Seelaf married his wife, Edna Mary McMillan, in 1938. They had one son, Anthony, who in 1976 died in a road accident in Kuwait.

== Labour activism ==
In 1936, Seelaf got a temporary job at the meatworks of W. Angliss and Company. There, he encountered a de-skilled, casualised and non-unionised workforce, a consequence of the Great Depression. Seelaf joined the Australasian Meat Industry Employees Union (AMIEU); by 1939, he was the secretary of the Angliss inter-union shop committee. In the same year, he joined the Australian Labor Party, before leaving the next year, and joining the Communist Party of Australia (CPA) in 1942. He continued to further involve himself in CPA and AMIEU affairs; in 1943, Seelaf managed Cecil Herbert Sharpley's unsuccessful campaign for the seat of Footscray, and by 1944, he was an AMIEU union organizer.

In 1947, Seelaf was made Secretary of the AMIEU, a position he would hold for over two decades. Under Seelaf, the AMIEU became a renowned campaigning force. It agitated for both industrial goals, such as shorter hours and better wages, and non-industrial positions, such as opposing antisemitism and homophobia. In 1957, Seelaf was elected as the representative of the food trade unions, on the executive committee of the Australian Council of Trade Unions (ACTU). However, this was opposed by right-wingers, due to his CPA membership; two years later, he was removed from the executive by one vote.

Involving himself in the Wave Hill walk-off, Seelaf became a trustee of the campaign group, 'Gurindji Aboriginal Land Rights Struggle'. Seelaf took an interest in agriculture, aiming to unify city-based unionists with family farmers, believing them to both be victims of large businesses. In 1968, he advocated for the introduction of state-owned farms, to stabilise production and employment in the meat industry. In 1969, the AMIEU became involved in a case before the Australian Industrial Relations Commission regarding equal pay for women; there had been hinting from AMIEU organisers that, if the case failed, industrial action would occur. However, the Commission provided a disappointing ruling of equal pay for women only for identical work, frustrating activists due to difficulties in proving equal work. Seelaf's subsequent decision to abandon the cause disappointed feminists, including prominent campaigner and AMIEU employee Zelda D'Aprano. Seelaf dismissed D'Aprano from her AMIEU job in 1970, after an argument over his treatment of female staff.

In 1969, Seelaf played a key role in future Prime Minister Bob Hawke's elevation to the ACTU's presidency, noted as a skilled negotiator and organiser. He retired from his AMIEU role in 1973, to focus on his community involvement and his family.

== Other activities ==
A lifelong Footscray resident, Seelaf was informally afforded a number of titles, including the "king" and "mayor" of the suburb, "Mr Footscray", and "the King of the West". He held numerous community roles in both Footscray and Melbourne's broader western suburbs, including foundation member of the Living Museum of the West, president and secretary of the Footscray Historical Society, chair of the Footscray Community Activity Committee, and patron of Footscray Technical College (now Victoria University). In 1984, Seelaf was given an honorary Master of Arts degree by Footscray Technical College. He was an ardent supporter of the Footscray Football Club (now the Western Bulldogs).

Seelaf was also highly involved with Melbourne's arts and literary scene. In 1950, he also played a major role in the publishing of Frank Hardy's Power Without Glory. He then co-ordinated defence upon Hardy's subsequent arrest. In 1952, he co-founded and became the inaugural chairman of the Australasian Book Society. In 1974, Seelaf drove the creation of Footscray Community Arts, an arts centre for the western suburbs' migrant communities. With fellow activist Peter Green, he converted a Footscray Technical College shed, then serving as a temporary classroom, into the centre, that would grow into a "cornerstone of cultural identity in Melbourne’s West". Seelaf also served in a number of prominent roles in these communities, including as chairperson of the Sidney Myer Music Bowl, trustee of the Victorian Arts Centre Trust, and inaugural Arts Officer for both the Victorian Trades Hall and the ACTU.

== Death and legacy ==
As part of the 1976 Australia Day Honours, Seelaf was made a Member of the Order of Australia, for his "service to the community and to the trade union movement".

Seelaf died on 9 August 1988, having suffered from cancer from at least 1956. Shortly before his death, a public dinner was held to establish the George Seelaf Trust, to fundraise for the arts in the western suburbs of Melbourne. He is also commemorated by George Seelaf Square, located at the former Angliss meatworks where his career began.
