= Hayden Starke =

Australian judge

The Honourable Sir Hayden Starke KCMG
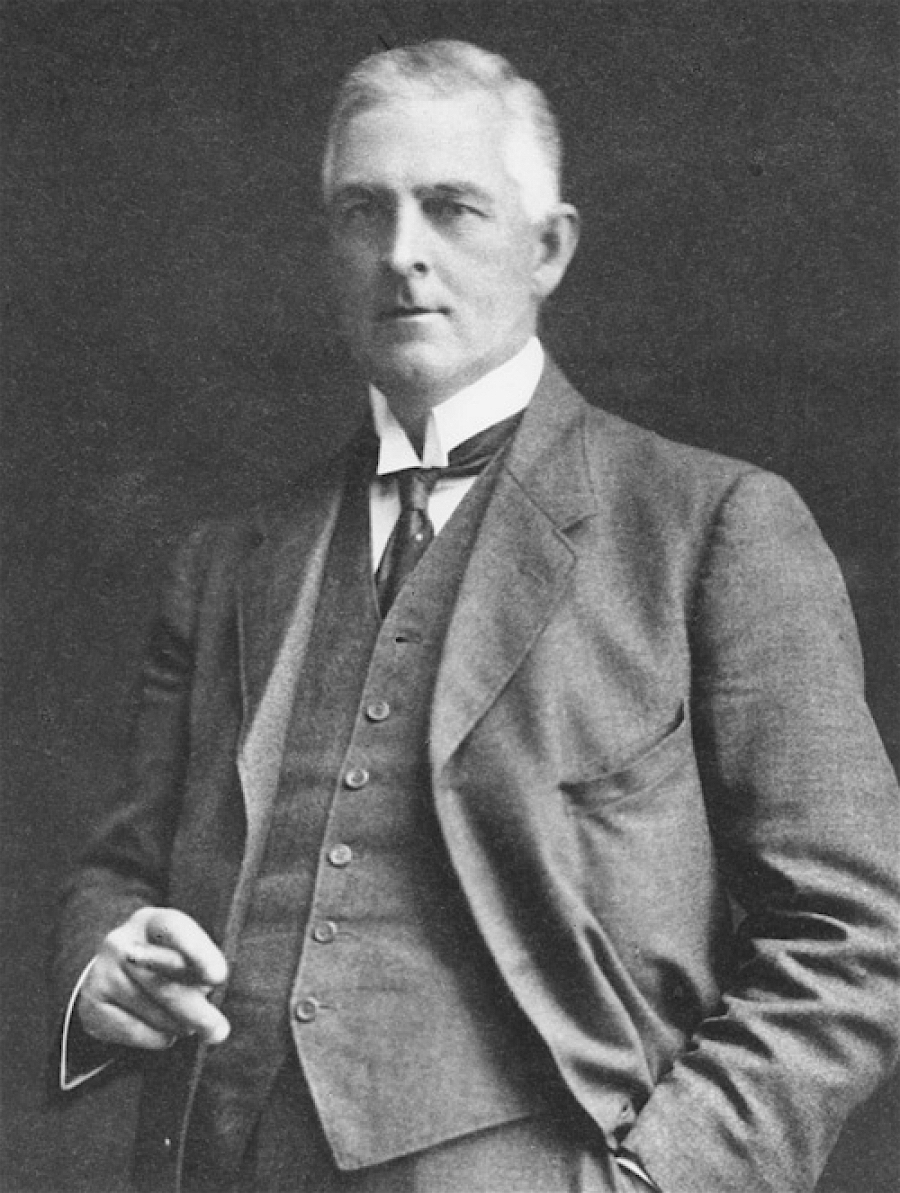

Justice of the High Court of Australia
- In office 5 February 1920 – 31 January 1950
- Nominated by: Billy Hughes
- Preceded by: Sir Edmund Barton
- Succeeded by: Sir Wilfred Fullagar

Personal details
- Born: 22 February 1871 Creswick, Victoria, Australia
- Died: 14 May 1958 (aged 87) Toorak, Victoria, Australia
- Spouse: Margaret Duffy (m. 1909)

Sir Hayden Erskine Starke (22 February 1871 – 14 May 1958) was an Australian judge who served on the High Court of Australia from 1920 to 1950. He was a prominent Melbourne barrister before his appointment to the court.

== Early life ==
Starke was born in 1871 in the Victorian gold rush town of Creswick, Victoria, where his father was the Chief Medical Officer of the Creswick Hospital. Dr Anthony George Hayden Starke had emigrated from Honiton in Devon in 1863 to take up the position at the new hospital in this bustling town that then rivalled Ballarat. Hayden Starke was educated at the Scotch College in Melbourne.

== Barrister ==
Starke completed a course as an articled clerk in 1892, and was admitted to the Victorian Bar later that year, having won the annual Prize in Law from the Supreme Court of Victoria. He practised as a barrister until he was appointed to the bench of the High Court in 1920. Between 1903 (when the High Court was created) and 1920, he appeared before the court 211 times, more than any other justice of the court.

== High Court ==
Starke was appointed to the High Court in 1920 by the Hughes government, following the death of Sir Edmund Barton, a foundation member of the court. From 1920 to 1921, he was the Deputy President of the Commonwealth Court of Conciliation and Arbitration.

Starke was a mentor to John Latham, an Attorney-General of Australia and later Chief Justice of Australia, although there was later friction between them, when Latham was Chief Justice. Starke had a reputation for being upfront and independent. Although it is common practice for the Chief Justice to compose a list of proposals, identifying which justice will hear which case, Starke would regularly arrive and hear cases, often without notice. Starke had a tendency to dissent from the majority opinions offered by the likes of Latham and Owen Dixon. To some extent, commentators have attributed this to personal disagreements with the other justices, as well as his ideological independence. Starke thought that some justices, such as Edward McTiernan, and George Rich, were too heavily under the influence of Owen Dixon, and is said to have referred to them as "parrots" and "worms". At one stage he was not even on speaking terms with fellow judge H. V. Evatt. Over 60 years after Starke's retirement, Justice Dyson Heydon, in his reasons for allowing an appeal brought by Jayant Patel against manslaughter convictions, noted that Patel's charge sheet listed fraud charges before manslaughter charges and said: "The young Hayden Starke would have applauded this decision to place important questions of dollars and cents ahead of mere manslaughter matters".

In 1939, Starke was created a Knight Commander of the Order of St Michael and St George. He resigned from the High Court on 31 January 1950. Starke died in 1958. A Chair of Law is named after him at the law school of Monash University.
