= Jack McPhillips =

Australian communist and trade unionist

Leslie John "Jack" McPhillips

Personal details
- Born: 21 March 1910 Rockhampton, Queensland
- Died: 1 September 2004 (aged 94) Sydney
- Party: Socialist Party of Australia.
- Profession: Trade unionist

Leslie John McPhillips (21 March 1910 – 1 September 2004) was an Australian communist and trade unionist. He joined the Communist Party of Australia in 1929.

Jack was one of the early generation of CPA union officials, he was a long-time leader of the Communist Party of Australia and was prominent in the union movement of the 1940s, '50s and '60s. When the CPA denounced the Soviet intervention in Czechoslovakia, McPhillips sided with the pro-Soviet tendency in the party. He opposed the new 'Eurocommunist' line of the party. In 1971 he took part in breaking away from CPA and forming the Socialist Party of Australia. He was President of SPA from 1984 to 1988.

== Works ==
- 1944: The Work of Our Union: Summary of a Report
- 1952: Arbitration?
- 1954: Act Now to Defend Living Conditions
- 1958: Penal Powers: Menzies' Weapon Against Unions and Wages
- 1961: Today's Wages Fight
- 1963: Penal Powers Cost Unionists £1,000,000!
- 1974: BHP Loses £15,000 and Much Prestige
- 1981: Communists and the Trade Unions
- 1985: The Accord and Its Consequences: Trade Union Experiences
- 1994: Wharfies and Miners Say "Enough is Enough": The Story of the 1994 Wharfies' and Miners' Disputes

== See also ==
- List of foreign delegations at the 9th SED Congress
