= Australasian Book Society =

Australian cooperative publishing society

The Australasian Book Society was a cooperative publishing society in Australia, between 1952 and 1981. Founded in Melbourne by activist George Seelaf, the society was funded by member subscriptions, and each member would receive four books annually.

The society was founded through the initiative of author Frank Hardy following the success of his book Power Without Glory.

According to the University of Queensland's Fryer Library, the Australasian Book Society was known to have had strong links with both communist and trade union activists. Some sources claim that the society was founded by the Communist Party of Australia.
