= Ralph Gibson (political activist) =

Australian political activist

- Born: 19 February 1906; Hampstead, London, England
- Died: 16 May 1989 (aged 83); East Malvern, Victoria, Australia
- Education: University of Melbourne
- Notable work: My Years in the Communist Party (1966); One Woman's Life (1980); The People Stand Up (1983); The Fight Goes On
- Spouse: Dorothy Alexander (1937–1978, her death)
- Parent: W.R. Boyce Gibson

Ralph Siward Gibson (19 February 1906 – 16 May 1989) was an Australian communist organiser and writer.

== Early life ==
Gibson was born in Hampstead in London to W.R. Boyce Gibson and Lucy Judge, née Peacock. The elder Gibson was appointed to the chair of philosophy at the University of Melbourne in 1911, and the family moved to Toorak, before relocating to Mont Albert in 1918. The younger Ralph attended Glamorgan Preparatory and Melbourne Church of England Grammar schools before graduating from the University of Melbourne (where he was a resident at Trinity College) in 1927 with a Bachelor of Arts (Hons) in history and politics.

== Career ==
In 1925 Gibson was one of the founders of the university Labor Club and was active in the Labor Guild of Youth. He returned to England in 1927 and received a Master of Arts from the University of Manchester in 1930. He was an organiser for the British Labour Party at the 1929 general election before returning to Australia in 1931 to work as an extension lecturer for the Workers' Educational Association in 1931. Gibson became disillusioned with the Scullin government and its failure to deal with unemployment, and joined the Communist Party of Australia in January 1932.

Gibson was a full-time party organiser for forty years. He was gaoled in 1933 for three weeks after addressing an illegal street meeting. On 16 March 1937, after returning from the World Peace Conference in Brussels, he married Dorothy Alexander in Melbourne. They settled in Oakleigh. Gibson was a member of the central committee and editor of the communist newspaper the Guardian from 1943 to 1948. He was the principal witness before Justice Lowe's royal commission of 1949–50 into communism in Victoria, and was little moved by Khrushchev's revelations about Stalinism in 1956.

== Later life ==
Gibson published My Years in the Communist Party in 1966, and following his wife's death in 1978 published a memoir of her, One Woman's Life, in 1980. He later published The People Stand Up in 1983 and The Fight Goes On in 1987, two exhaustive histories of communism in Australia and the world.

He died at East Malvern in 1989 and was cremated.
