= Charles Lowe (judge) =

Australian judge

Sir Charles Lowe KCMG

Judge of the Supreme Court of Victoria
- In office 28 January 1927 – 31 January 1964

Personal details
- Born: 4 October 1880 Panmure, Victoria, Australia
- Died: 20 March 1969 (aged 88) East Melbourne, Victoria, Australia
- Spouse: Clara Dickason (m. 1908)
- Education: University of Melbourne

Sir Charles John Lowe KCMG (4 October 1880 – 20 March 1969) was an Australian judge. He served on the Supreme Court of Victoria from 1927 to 1964, the longest serving judge in the court's history. He presided over several major federal and state government inquiries.

== Early life ==
Lowe was born on 4 October 1880 in Panmure, Victoria. His father was born in Lancashire, England, and worked as a schoolteacher until being pensioned off due to blindness. Lowe attended the University of Melbourne where he was the "model of the able poor student", graduating Bachelor of Arts in 1900, Master of Arts in 1902 and Bachelor of Laws in 1904. He was admitted to the Victorian Bar in 1905.

== Judicial career ==
Lowe was appointed to the Supreme Court of Victoria in January 1927, with the encouragement of his friend Owen Dixon. This was with an annual salary of £2500 (equivalent to A$207,400 in 2020).

He notably presided over the trial of the accused Pyjama Girl murderer in 1944, and the murder trial of radio announcer John Bryan Kerr in 1950, where his decision was upheld on appeal to the Judicial Committee of the Privy Council. He also presided over "four major commissions of inquiry":

- the 1940 inquiry into the Canberra air disaster,
- the 1942 inquiry into the Bombing of Darwin,
- the 1943 federal royal commission into the Minister for Labor Eddie Ward's "Brisbane Line" allegations, and
- the 1949–1950 Royal Commission Inquiring into the Origins, Aims, Objects and Funds of the Communist Party in Victoria and Other Related Matters, into the Communist Party of Australia. Communist activist Ralph Gibson concluded that Lowe, "contrary to our fears and to the Government's hopes, displayed a certain genuine interest in Communist theory and a certain respect for evidence".

Lowe retired from the court in 1964 after a record 37 years, presiding over his final trial in 1962.

== Other activities ==
Lowe served as chancellor of the University of Melbourne from 1941 to 1954, in place of John Latham. He "spoke out for better conditions for professors, publicly supported research, international academic intercourse, 'liberal education', and co-residential colleges". He also served as president of the local English-Speaking Union and the Australian-Asian Association of Victoria.
