= Henry Parker =

Henry Parker may refer to:

- Henry Parker (MP for Bedford) (by 1509–1551), MP for Bedford
- Sir Henry Parker (MP for Hertfordshire) (died 1552), MP for Hertfordshire
- Sir Henry Parker, 2nd Baronet (1638–1713), English politician
- Henry Meredith Parker (1796–1868), British writer
- Henry Parker (bishop) (1852–1888), Anglican bishop in Africa
- Henry Parker (writer) (1604–1652), political writer during the English Civil War
- Henry Parker (Georgia official) (c. 1690–c. 1777), colonial governor of the U.S. state of Georgia
- Sir Henry Parker (Australian politician) (1808–1881), Premier of New South Wales
- Henry Parker (cricketer) (1819–1901), English clergyman and cricketer
- Henry Taylor Parker (1867–1934), American theater and music critic
- Henry Wise Parker (1875–1940), British admiral
- Henry Parker (author), British engineer in 19th century colonial Sri Lanka, author of Ancient Ceylon and Village folk-tales of Ceylon
- Henry H. Parker (1858–1930), English landscape artist
- Henry Hodges Parker (1834–1927), kahu (pastor) of Kawaiahaʻo Church in Honolulu
- Henry Perlee Parker (1795–1873), English history painter
- Henry Parker, 10th Baron Morley (c. 1480–c. 1553/6), English peer and translator
- Henry Parker, 11th Baron Morley (1533–1577), English peer
- Henry Parker, 14th Baron Morley (c. 1600–1655)
- Henry Parker (Royal Navy officer) (born 1963), British admiral
- Henry Villiers Parker, Viscount Boringdon (1806–1817), British nobleman
- Sir Harry Parker, 6th Baronet (1735–1812)

== See also ==
- Baron Morley
- Harry Parker (disambiguation)
