= Harold Parker =

Harold Parker may refer to:

- Harold Parker (sculptor) (1873–1962), British-born Australian sculptor
- Harold Parker (footballer) (1892–1917), Australian rules footballer
- Harold Parker (civil servant) (1895–1980), English civil servant
- Harold Parker (politician), American politician
- Harold Parker State Forest, Massachusetts

== See also ==
- Harry Parker (disambiguation)
