= List of places on the Victorian Heritage Register in the City of Glen Eira =

This is a list of places on the Victorian Heritage Register in the City of Glen Eira in Victoria, Australia. The Victorian Heritage Register is maintained by the Heritage Council of Victoria.

The Victorian Heritage Register, as of 2026, listed the following 23 state-registered places within the City of Glen Eira:

Place name	Place #	Location	Suburb	Co-ordinates	Built	State registered	Photo
Caulfield Racecourse	H2415	Normanby Rd and Station St	Caulfield East	37°52′52″S 145°2′24″E	c. 1859	23 February 2023	
Caulfield railway station complex	H1665	Sir John Monash Dr	Caulfield East	37°52′38″S 145°02′32″E	1879	20 August 1982	
Elsternwick Fire Station (former)	H2376	2–4 Selwyn St	Elsternwick	37°53′02″S 145°00′05″E	1895	10 August 2017	
Ernest Fooks House	H2191	32 Howitt Rd	Caulfield North	37°52′30″S 145°00′58″E	1966	12 March 2009	
Grand Union Tramway Junction	H0227	Hawthorn Rd and Balaclava Rd	Caulfield North	37°52′22″S 145°01′29″E	1913	15 February 2007	
Labassa and its adjacent former conservatory	H0135	2 Manor Dr	Caulfield North	37°52′11″S 145°00′35″E	1862–; 1890	9 October 1974	
Labassa and its adjacent former conservatory	H2005	21 Manor Dr	Caulfield North	37°52′13″S 145°00′37″E	1890	14 November 2002	
Lind House	H2387	450 Dandenong Rd	Caulfield North	37°51′47″S 145°01′08″E	1956	14 June 2018	
Rippon Lea Estate	H0614	192 Hotham St	Elsternwick	37°52′45″S 144°59′58″E	1868	19 February 1986	
Tram shelter	H0174	Cnr Balaclava Rd and Orrong Rd	Caulfield North	37°52′15″S 145°00′32″E	1917	14 September 2006	
Tram shelter	H0230	Cnr Dandenong Rd and Hawthorn Rd	Caulfield North	37°51′56″S 145°01′33″E	1912	4 August 2006	
