= Harry Parker =

Harry Parker may refer to:

- Harry Parker (baseball) (1947–2012), pitcher in Major League Baseball
- Harry Parker (footballer), English footballer
- Harry Parker (rower) (1935–2013), rowing coach
- Harry Parker (swimmer) (1849–1932), English swimmer
- Harry Parker (tennis) (1873–1961), New Zealand tennis player
- Harry Parker (wrestler), British Olympic wrestler
- Sir Harry Parker, 6th Baronet (1735–1812), secretary of the Board of Longitude
- Harry Lee Parker (1894–1959), American and Irish neurologist

== See also ==
- Henry Parker (disambiguation)
- Harold Parker (disambiguation)
