= Speculative fiction by writers of color =

Speculative fiction created by nonwhite authors

Speculative fiction is defined as science fiction, fantasy, and horror. Within those categories exists many other subcategories, for example cyberpunk, magical realism, and psychological horror.

"Person of color" is a term used in the United States to denote non-white persons, sometimes narrowed to mean non-WASP persons or non-Hispanic whites, if "ethnic whites" are included. The term "person of color" is used to redefine what it means to be a part of the historically marginalized racial and ethnic groups within Western society. A writer of color is a writer who is a part of a marginalized culture in regards to traditional Euro-Western mainstream culture. This includes Asians, African-Americans, Africans, Native Americans, Latinos, Asian Americans, and Pacific Islanders.

== African-American speculative fiction ==
Black science fiction or black speculative fiction is an umbrella term that covers a variety of activities within the science fiction, fantasy, and horror genres where people of the African descent take part or are depicted. Some of its defining characteristics include a critique of the social structures leading to black oppression paired with an investment in social change. Black science fiction is "fed by technology but not led by it." This means that black science fiction often explores with human engagement with technology instead of technology as an innate good. In the late 1990s a number of cultural critics began to use the term Afrofuturism to depict a cultural and literary movement of thinkers and artists of the African diaspora who were using science, technology, and science fiction as means of exploring the black experience. However, as Nisi Shawl describes in her series on the history of black science fiction, black science fiction is a wide-ranging genre with a history reaching as far back as the 19th century. Also, because of the interconnections between black culture and black science fiction, "readers and critics need first to be familiar with the traditions of African American literature and culture" in order to correctly interpret the nuances of the texts. Indeed, John Pfeiffer has argued that there have always been elements of speculative fiction in black literature. Hope Wabuke, a writer and assistant professor at the University of Nebraska–Lincoln of English and Creative Writing, argues that the term "Black Speculative Literature" can encompass the terms Afrofuturism, Africanfuturism, and Africanjujuism, the latter two coined by Nnedi Okorafor, all of which center "African and African diasporic culture, thought, mythos, philosophy, and worldviews."

== Arab speculative fiction ==
Arab speculative fiction is speculative fiction written by Arabic authors that commonly portrays themes of repression, cyclical violence, and the concept of a utopia long lost by years of destruction. Arabic-American speculative fiction is portrayed through the involvement of the United States in the country-specific subgenres of Arabic speculative fiction. Culture specific subgenres have their own distinct themes from one another characterized by the experiences of those within their respective states. Two such states, the land referred to as Palestine, and Egypt, each have themes specific to their individual histories and cultural experiences. Examples of themes in Palestinian speculative fiction include settler occupation, lost futures, and stoicism in the face of opposition, while themes in Egyptian speculative fiction include militant governments, repressed uprisings, and totalitarianism.

== Asian and Asian American speculative fiction ==
While the term Afrofuturism is widely used and accepted to explain the mingling of the African American experience with technology, science, and the future, a similar term, "Asianfuturism," has yet to catch on. Popularity is growing for English translations of Chinese science fiction novels, but the number of Asian-American science fiction authors remains small and underrepresented. Women's experiences are also explored through the lens of cyberpunk fiction, with an emphasis on the female body.

=== Japanese speculative fiction ===
Science fiction is an important genre of modern Japanese literature that has strongly influenced aspects of contemporary Japanese pop culture, including anime, manga, video games, tokusatsu, and cinema. Japanese fiction has assumed a position of significance in many genres of world literature, with speculative fiction encompassing a diverse range of literary works, has a rich history deeply intertwined with the country's cultural and social contexts, It is Often characterized by its imaginative narratives, futuristic themes, and exploration of societal issues, It has gained international recognition for its unique blend of traditional storytelling elements with modern speculative concepts. Contemporary Japanese speculative fiction has themes focusing on artificial intelligence, genetic engineering, and environmental degradation are prevalent, reflecting the anxieties and realities of the modern world.

==== Japanese horror ====
Belief in ghosts, demons and spirits has been deep-rooted in Japanese folklore throughout history. It is entwined with mythology and superstition derived from Japanese Shinto, as well as Buddhism and Taoism brought to Japan from China and India. Stories and legends, combined with mythology, have been collected over the years by various cultures of the world, both past and present. Folklore has evolved in order to explain or rationalize various natural events. Inexplicable phenomena arouse a fear in humankind because there is no way for us to anticipate them or to understand their origins. The early horror stories of Japan (also known as Kaidan or more recently J-Horror) revolved around vengeful spirits or Yūrei. In recent years, interest in these tales have been revived with the release of such films as Ju-on: The Grudge and Ring .

=== Chinese American speculative fiction ===
Chinese American speculative fiction is speculative fiction written by Chinese-American authors that many speculative works by Asian American authors delve into the immigrant experience, addressing themes of displacement, assimilation, and the search for belonging in a new land. Like speculative fiction in general, Chinese American speculative fiction often serves as a platform for social commentary. It may address current issues such as racism, discrimination, environmental degradation, and political unrest through the lens of speculative elements. Chinese American speculative fiction written by and about women work on creating the feeling of nostalgia in readers, focusing in on experiences by second-generation Americans.

=== Indian speculative fiction ===
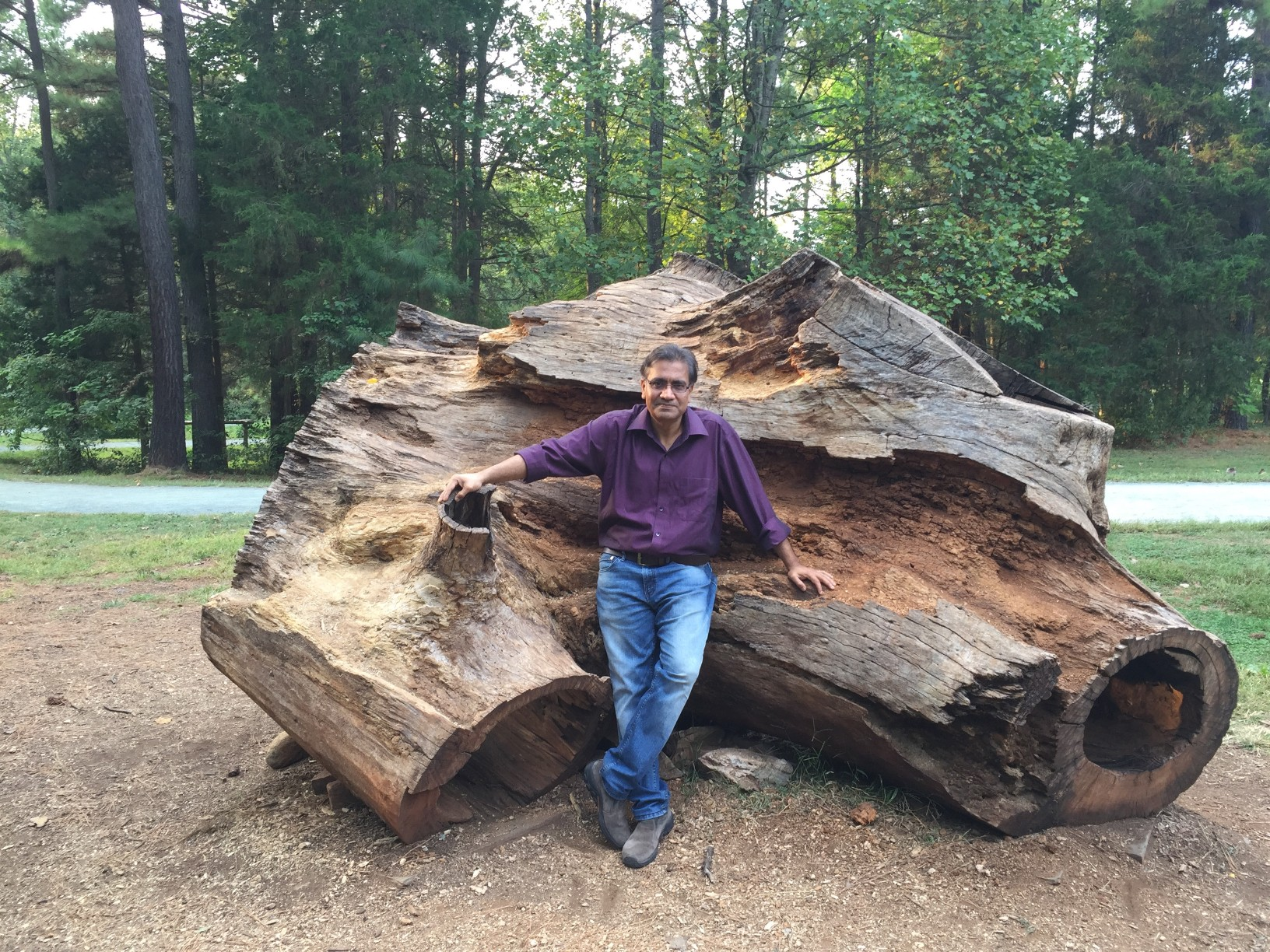
Anil Menon, Indian science fiction author known for his novels "The Beast With Nine Billion Feet" and "Half of What I Say" as well as his contributions to many short story anthologies

Indian speculative fiction has had long-standing roots with the earliest known examples being published in 1835. Early authors such as Henry Meredith Parker, Henry Goodeve, Kylas Chunder Dutt, Soshee Chunder Dutt, Rokeya Sakhawat Hossain, and Jagadish Chandra Bose helped develop the genre. From "The Junction of the Ocean: A Tale of the Year 2098", a story of how the construction of the Panama Canal changed the landscape of the world to "The Republic of Orissá; A Page from the Annals of the Twentieth Century”, a dystopia about a revolt against Britain's institutionalization of a law supporting slavery on colonial India, and "Sultana's Dream", a feminist utopia in where traditional gender norms are turned on their head, as well as, "Runaway Cyclone", about a man who calmed a sea storm using hair oil, which anticipated the phenomenon known as the "butterfly effect," these authors' contributions bring unique perspectives on imperial and anti-imperial sentiments during colonial times. With recent twisted in the genre, stories present a different take for readers to appreciate.

== Latino/Latinx speculative fiction ==
Speculative fiction by authors in the Latino community explores environmental and social issues, ethnicity, diaspora, ethnicity, and other issues. At the same time, countries like Mexico have their own traditions of speculative narratives, with Latin America having a "rich diversity" of speculative stories.

Latino literature scholar Renee Hudson stated that "speculative imaginaries" are limited by contradictions inherent in Latinidad, which some scholars described as incoherent, and noted that Latinx speculative fictions are "not immune from colonizer imaginaries," while stating that such fictions can "move beyond nationalistic frameworks" and called them a toolkit for a "more just, anti-racist world and a more expansive, inclusive latinidad."

Several books have been published on this subject, including Altermundos: Latin@ Speculative Literature, Film, and Popular Culture, Latinx Rising: An Anthology of Latinx Science Fiction and Fantasy and Speculative Fiction for Dreamers: A Latinx Anthology, noting the focus of this fiction on modernity, immigration, globalization, identity, colonialism, gender, and race.

== Indigenous speculative fiction of North America ==
Many Indigenous writers of the Americas write speculative fiction, including Native Americans in the United States Indigenous peoples in Canada, and Greenlandic Inuit. There is also categorical overlap between many Latine people and Indigenous peoples of the Americas.

Indigenous futurisms is a widespread movement, related to Afrofuturism and science fiction, that involves Indigenous peoples imagining possible futures through fiction.

Two-Spirit speculative fiction is a genre that explores gender identity and cultural perspectives through Indigenous traditions and futuristic or alternate realities, sometimes empowering and inspiring readers. The genre offers Indigenous authors and readers a chance to express, reclaim, and reshape their narratives while questioning conventional views on gender and culture through fictional stories. The emergence of Two-Spirit speculative fiction can be understood in the context of queer literature's broader landscape. This includes its efforts to challenge heteronormative narratives and enhance representation within the LGBTQ+ community. Two-Spirit authors use their writing to assert their independence from settler counter-parts and envision a better future for themselves and their communities.

Such works are also characterized by a sense of optimism and hope for the future, contrasting with the dark history of Indigenous peoples in the Americas, marked by destruction and genocide.

== See also ==
- Carl Brandon Society
- Dark Matter (series)
- Cross-genre
- Chinese speculative fiction
- Science fiction films in India
- Speculative writers from:
  - Japan
  - Thailand
  - Cuba
  - Argentina
  - Brazil
