= Elsternwick Metropolitan Fire Brigade Station =

Elsternwick Metropolitan Fire Brigade Station (former)
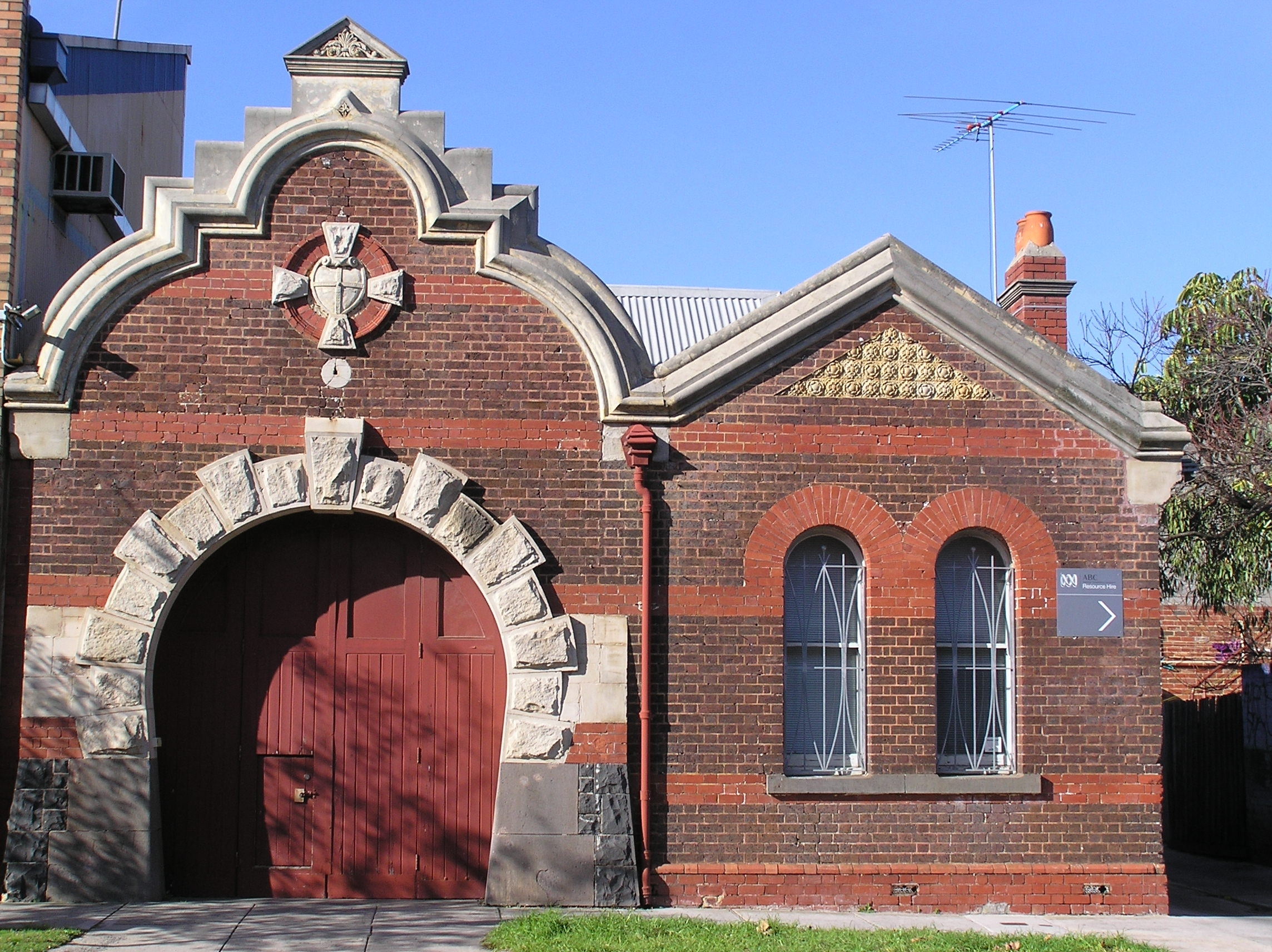
- The former fire station in 2007

- Location of the former fire station in Greater Metropolitan Melbourne

General information
- Status: Completed
- Type: Fire station (former)
- Architectural style: Victorian Romanesque
- Location: 2–4 Selwyn Street, Elsternwick, City of Glen Eira, Melbourne, Victoria, Australia
- Coordinates: 37°53′02″S 145°00′05″E
- Completed: 1895; 131 years ago
- Renovated: 1950s
- Closed: 1926 (as a fire station)
- Cost: £769
- Client: Metropolitan Fire Brigade
- Owner: Australian Broadcasting Corporation (since 1989)

Technical details
- Material: Bricks; limestone; bluestone; timber; corrugated iron; slate; terracotta; glass; pressed metal

Design and construction
- Architect: John Thomas Kelleher
- Architecture firm: Public Works Department (Victoria)

Commonwealth Heritage List
- Official name: Metropolitan Fire Brigade Station (former)
- Type: Removed
- Designated: 22 June 2004
- Delisted: unknown date
- Reference no.: 105216

Victorian Heritage Register
- Official name: Former Elsternwick Fire Station
- Type: Registered place
- Criteria: a., d.
- Designated: 10 August 2017
- Reference no.: VHR H2376
- Heritage overlay no.: HO81
- Category: Utilities - Fire Control

Register of the National Estate
- Official name: Metropolitan Fire Brigade Station (former), Elsternwick
- Type: Defunct register
- Designated: 20 May 2003
- Reference no.: 15720

The Elsternwick Metropolitan Fire Brigade Station is a heritage-listed former fire station at 2–4 Selwyn Street, Elsternwick, in the inner eastern suburbs of Melbourne, in Victoria, Australia.

Built in 1895 on the traditional lands of the Bunurong people, the former fire station was added to the Australian Commonwealth Heritage List on 22 June 2004 and subsequently removed from the list on an unknown date. The former fire station was added to the Victorian Heritage Register on 10 August 2017 in recognition of its architectural, cultural, and historical significance; and was also added to non-statutory lists by the Victorian branch of the National Trust on 7 February 1974 and the now defunct Register of the National Estate on 20 May 2003.

== History ==
Elsternwick village was laid out by surveyor Robert Hoddle in 1851, and was further subdivided in 1856. Until the land boom of the 1880s, the Elsternwick area primarily consisted of rural estates and was sparsely populated. The land boom brought more modern settlement patterns, with rural estates subdivided into suburban housing and commercial lots. The land on which the former fire station is located was originally purchased by Hugh Moore in the 1860s as part of his country estate. He subdivided his plot in 1888, and created 71 building plots and a row of commercial buildings on the street front. By 1892, the land at 2–4 Selwyn Street was used as a wood and coal yard.

=== Fire fighting in Melbourne ===
Prior to the end of the 19th century, firefighting in Melbourne was mostly haphazard, with no coordinated efforts throughout the metropolitan area. Melbourne's first firefighting service was established by the Fire Protection Society in 1845, with a series of volunteer brigades formed in major suburban centres from the 1850s. By the 1860s and 1870s more professional outfits were established, primarily by commercial, industrial, and insurance concerns, to help protect their assets. Due to the ad hoc nature of these services, however, their effectiveness was limited.

In 1885, a Select Committee of the Victorian Government recommended the formation of a formal and coordinated fire fighting service for Melbourne, culminating in the Fire Brigades Act (VIC), 1891. The Metropolitan Fire Brigade (MFB) was created and took over the Insurance Companies' Fire Brigade station at 447 Little Bourke Street, until its new headquarters, the Eastern Hill Fire Station in Gisborne Street, East Melbourne, were completed in November 1893.

In 1892 the MFB implemented a plan to establish thirty-six fire stations throughout the Melbourne metropolitan area; of which thirty-two were newly-constructed. Between 1892 and 1896 these stations were established at a cost of Victoria of £77,750. A number of different architects were engaged to design fire stations during this period, resulting in a proliferation of styles and forms.

=== Elsternwick station ===
A volunteer fire brigade was established in Elsternwick in 1890, operating out of basic premises opposite the post office. The volunteer service was taken over by the MFB the following year. The land for the Elsternwick Station was leased by the Victorian Railway Commissioner, and a deal was made to provide use of the site to the MFB, who purchased the site in 1895. It was initially proposed to construct a simple weatherboard station at Elsternwick but, after deputations to the MFB from members of the local municipality, it was upgraded to a more substantial timber building. In 1895, former Victorian Public Works architect, John Thomas Kelleher, was appointed to provide designs for the Elsternwick station, as well as those at Flemington and Yarraville. The Elsternwick station was to be complemented by another, more substantial, station at nearby Caulfield.

Kelleher worked in the Victorian Public Service from 1863 to 1894 and during that time he developed a strong reputation, expressed most solidly in his designs for buildings such as the post offices in Flemington, Fitzroy and Bairnsdale, as well as the courthouses in Warragul, Benalla, and Bairnsdale. It is possible that the fire station designs he created for the MFB were the first of his private practice career, as he had left the public service in 1894. The land cost £125; and total costs were £769. The Elsternwick Fire Station was in full service by 1895 and it operated as a fire station until 1926, when it was closed, possibly superseded by modernisation of the MFB network.

=== Subsequent use ===
The site was sold to JJ Webster Pty Ltd, who owned timber yards adjacent to the station. After World War II it was sold again and converted into a motor garage, operating under the name of "Esquire Motors". During this period a number of key renovations and conversions were carried out on the building. In 1989, the building was acquired by the Australian Broadcasting Corporation as part of ABC TV's Elsternwick complex.

== Description ==
The former fire station is an example of a small outer suburban fire station, one of many built in the Melbourne metropolitan area between 1892 and 1940. It retains many of the principal characteristics of a small late-19th century fire station, and is an example of the work of prominent Victorian architect John Thomas Kelleher, completed in the Victorian Romanesque Revival style.

The former fire station is a single storey building built from black body bricks with red brick dressings. It bears close resemblance to the other two MFB stations designed by Kelleher in 1895. The most prominent of these similarities is the large Moorish horseshoe arch which marked the entrance to the engine room that features rusticated limestone and fine axed basalt, and the arch remains the most dominant feature of the facade. The arch is presently in-filled with solid timber panelling, with a single standard sized door providing entry to the building. It is surmounted by an Anglo-Dutch gable and a heraldic emblem, probably that of the MFB. The facade also features freestone, dressed and axe finished with red tuckpointing. The sills and stonework to the lower side of the cartway entry are dressed and axe finished bluestone. The roofing is corrugated iron, although the original appears to have been slate with terracotta ridge crestings.

Between 1926 and 1989, the interior showed limited resemblance to the original building fitout. The most conspicuous change was the renovation of the engine room into a mechanic's workshop and showroom, most likely during the 1950s. Some of the original pressed metal centrepieces and panelled ceilings were retained. Further cosmetic changes to the interior occurred since 1989, as office and studio space for the Australian Broadcasting Corporation.

This building illustrates the portfolio of Kelleher, especially as perhaps the first example of his work after leaving the public service. In stylistic terms, the Elsternwick former fire station is quite similar to the others designed by Kelleher, but in condition and integrity Elsternwick is superior to Yarraville, and Flemington is superior in turn to Elsternwick. Nonetheless, Elsternwick remains in good condition and, at least from the exterior, strongly illustrates the main features of its type, and late 19th-century metropolitan fire stations as a broad group.

Of the 36 fire stations established by the MFB between 1892 and 1896, the former station at Elsternwick and the former Eastern Hill Fire Station, built in the Queen Anne Revival style, remain extant, and provide a significant link to this period in the development of firefighting services. The original Insurance Companies' Fire Brigade Station at 447 Little Bourke Street is no longer extant.

The Elsternwick former fire station is in good condition. Its internal integrity is compromised by a number of changes that have occurred since the station closed in 1927. These changes pertain strongly to the building's use as a motor garage and showroom in the 1945-1989 period. It is currently used by the Australian Broadcasting Corporation as office and studio space. Externally, the integrity is good, although, as of 2001, the roofing was not the original fabric.

== See also ==
- Architecture of Melbourne
- List of fire stations in Melbourne
- List of places on the Victorian Heritage Register in the City of Glen Eira
