= Tram shelter, Kew =

Heritage-listed tram shelter in Melbourne, Victoria, Australia

- Location of the tram shelter in Greater Metropolitan Melbourne

General information
- Status: Completed
- Type: Tram shelter
- Architectural style: Federation
- Location: Cotham and Burke roads, Kew, City of Boroondara, Melbourne, Victoria, Australia
- Coordinates: 37°48′37″S 145°03′38″E
- Completed: c.1913; 113 years ago
- Client: Prahran and Malvern Tramways Trust

Technical details
- Material: Corrugated iron; cast iron; timber

Design and construction
- Architect: Leonard Flanagan

Victorian Heritage Register
- Official name: Tram Verandah Shelter
- Type: Registered place
- Designated: 14 September 2006
- Reference no.: VHR H0173
- Heritage overlay no.: HO484
- Category: Transport - Tramways

The tram shelter located on the corner of Cotham and Burke roads in Kew was constructed in c. 1913 for the Prahran and Malvern Tramways Trust and is one of only three remaining tram shelters in Melbourne designed in the form of a verandah. The shelter is located on the north-west corner of the intersection, in the City of Boroondara, in the inner eastern suburbs of Melbourne, in Victoria, Australia.

Built in 1913 on the traditional lands of the Wurundjeri people, the tram shelter was added to the Victorian Heritage Register on 14 September 2006 in recognition of its historical and architectural significance; and was also added to a non-statutory list by the Victorian branch of the National Trust on 3 April 2000.

== History ==
The Prahran and Malvern Tramways Trust (PMTT), established in 1907, was the first municipal electric tramway in Melbourne and became the largest and most successful of all the municipal tramway trusts. Its services played a key role in facilitating suburban expansion and the development of the southern and eastern suburbs. The growth of tramways was one of the greatest municipal developments in Victoria during the first decade of the twentieth century. The waiting shelter is an important remnant of this period of Melbourne's transport history and a tangible reminder of the PMTT.

Due to Melbourne's changeable weather conditions, the various tramway operators in Melbourne built shelters at tram stops, and a small number of the shelters are extant and in current use. They were initially built in the outer extent of the tramway routes, due to the limited frequency of tram services, where passengers could wait for 15 minutes or more for a tram; or at major interchanges between the various tram routes. Some of the shelters were built from timber and others using iron.

The shelter in Kew was designed by notable Melbourne architect Leonard J. Flannagan (1864-1946). Flannagan was responsible for a number of buildings for the PMTT including the early waiting shelter at the junction of Dandenong Road and Hawthorn Road, Caulfield, and sections of the tram depot at Malvern, and also designed a depot for the Hawthorn Tramways Trust.

== Description ==
The waiting shelter, a conservative design influenced by Victorian architecture, is based on the Melbourne City Council late 19th-century standard cast iron verandah. It is of significance as an intact example of the cast iron type shelter and for its detail, including Corinthian columns and a rinceau pattern cast-iron frieze. The shelter is largely in keeping with the original design and retains its integrity.

The shelter has a corrugated iron roof fixed to an angle iron roof frame. The roof, which extends in the form of a skillion over the pavement, is supported on three squared, chamfered timber posts at the rear and three cast iron reeded columns with octagonal bases and Corinthian capitals at the front. The columns are hollow and function as downpipes, with rainwater discharging from the verandah roof, through the columns and under the ground. The shelter has a rinceau pattern frieze along the road frontage and cast iron brackets with shield motif, which does not contain a coat of arms. The side and rear panels are lined with ripple iron and the upper panel at the rear is lattice work. The shelter has two timber slatted bench seats.

== See also ==
- Architecture of Melbourne
- List of places on the Victorian Heritage Register in the City of Boroondara
- Trams in Melbourne
  - Tram shelter, Armadale
  - Tram shelter, Caulfield North
