= Tram shelter, Caulfield North (Dandenong and Hawthorn Roads) =

Heritage-listed tram shelter in Melbourne, Victoria, Australia

Tram shelter, Caulfield North Dandenong and Hawthorn Roads
- Location of the tram shelter in Greater Metropolitan Melbourne

General information
- Status: Completed
- Type: Tram shelter
- Architectural style: Edwardian
- Location: Dandenong and Hawthorn roads, Caulfield North, City of Glen Eira, Melbourne, Victoria, Australia
- Coordinates: 37°51′56″S 145°01′33″E
- Completed: 1912; 114 years ago
- Client: Prahran and Malvern Tramways Trust

Technical details
- Material: Timber; shingles; asbestos cement

Design and construction
- Architect: Leonard Flanagan

Victorian Heritage Register
- Official name: Tram Shelter
- Type: Registered place
- Designated: 4 August 2006
- Reference no.: VHR H0230
- Heritage overlay no.: HO19
- Category: Transport - Tramways

The tram shelter located on the corner of Dandenong and Hawthorn roads in Caulfield North was constructed in 1912 for the Prahran and Malvern Tramways Trust and is the oldest extant tram shelter in Melbourne, and possibly the first tram shelter built in the city. The shelter is located on the median strip, on the south-west corner of the intersection, near the junction with Alma Road, in the City of Glen Eira, in the inner eastern suburbs of Melbourne, in Victoria, Australia.

Built on the traditional lands of the Wurundjeri people, the tram shelter was added to the Victorian Heritage Register on 4 August 2006 in recognition of its historical and architectural significance; and was also added to a non-statutory list by the Victorian branch of the National Trust on 3 March 2000.

== History ==
The Prahran and Malvern Tramways Trust (PMTT), established in 1907, was the first municipal electric tramway in Melbourne and became the largest and most successful of all the municipal tramway trusts. Its services played a key role in facilitating suburban expansion and the development of the southern and eastern suburbs. The growth of tramways was one of the greatest municipal developments in Victoria during the first decade of the twentieth century. The waiting shelter is an important remnant of this period of Melbourne's transport history and a tangible reminder of the PMTT.

Due to Melbourne's changeable weather conditions, the various tramway operators in Melbourne built shelters at tram stops, and a small number of the shelters are extant and in current use. They were initially built in the outer extent of the tramway routes, due to the limited frequency of tram services, where passengers could wait for 15 minutes or more for a tram; or at major interchanges between the various tram routes. Some of the shelters were built from timber and others using iron.

The shelter in Caulfield North was designed by notable Melbourne architect Leonard J. Flannagan (1864–1946). Flannagan was responsible for a number of buildings for the PMTT including the later tram verandah shelter at the junction of Balaclava and Orrong roads, also in Caulfield North, and sections of the tram depot at Malvern, and also designed a depot for the Hawthorn Tramways Trust.

The waiting shelter is located at the corner of Dandenong Road and Hawthorn Road, at an interchange point in the tram network. The line from Wattletree Road, Malvern along Glenferrie and Dandenong Roads to the railway station at Windsor was opened on 16 December 1911. This route was extended to Chapel Street in February 1912 and linked to the cable tramway. On 12 April 1913 the Balaclava Road extension was opened, from Dandenong Road, Malvern to St. Kilda Beach, via Hawthorn and Balaclava Roads and Carlisle Street. The shelter is the oldest extant such structure in Melbourne, and possibly the first tram shelter built in the city.

== Description ==
The rustic Edwardian shelter is constructed mainly of timber and has a half-hipped roof with deep overhanging eaves. The small 'gablet' at each end has plain barge boards. The gable is faced with shingles and contains a louvred vent. The roof is clad in red asbestos cement tiles with a crested terracotta ridge terminated by scrolled terracotta finials. The hips have plain terracotta ridge tiles. The rafters are exposed under the projecting eaves, and the underside lined with boards. The walls are timber-framed with the upper panels, above the dado, lined with V-jointed boards arranged diagonally. The lower panels, below the dado, are clad with vertical V-jointed lining boards on the internal face and shingles on the external face. The interior is sub-divided by timber partitions into four alcoves framed by simple timber brackets; each has a built-in bench seat made of timber slats. The seats face in all four directions.

== See also ==
- Architecture of Melbourne
- List of places on the Victorian Heritage Register in the City of Glen Eira
- Trams in Melbourne
