= Harold Parker (footballer) =

Australian rules footballer

Personal information
- Full name: Harold Carlyle Parker
- Born: 26 September 1892; Elsternwick, Victoria
- Died: 30 January 1917 (aged 24); Armentières, France
- Original team: Essendon District

Playing career^{1}
Years	Club	Games (Goals)
1911	St Kilda	3 (-)
- ^{1} Playing statistics correct to the end of 1911.

Harold Carlyle Parker (26 September 1892 – 30 January 1917) was an Australian rules footballer who played with St Kilda in the Victorian Football League (VFL). He died of wounds received in active service in France in World War I.

== Family ==
The son of Robert Grainger Parker and Eva Parker, he was born in Elsternwick, Victoria on 26 September 1892. He attended Essendon State School. He married Jessie Parker (she remarried after the war and became Mrs. Cumming). At the time of his enlistment, he gave his occupation as warehouseman.

== Footballer ==
During the latter part of the 1911 season, the St. Kilda Football Club and its off-field operations, and its on-field performances were very seriously affected by a players' strike due to protracted disputes with the committee relating to its (mis-)management of club affairs.

Due to the sudden decisions of various played not to play in a particular match, the club used a total of 62 players that season, the most ever used in a single season by a VFL club. This indicates that, given Parker only played towards the end of the season (rounds 9. 13, and 14), he may not have been selected at all if all of the regular players were available.

When measured on his enlistment in the army in 1915, he was 5 ft 9in tall, and weighed 13 stone.

Recruited from the Essendon District Football League, aged 18, Parker played his first senior VFL match for St Kilda, against Collingwood, at Victoria Park on 17 June 1911. He played his second, against Fitzroy, at the Junction Oval, on 15 July 1911.

He played the last of his three VFL senior matches against Melbourne on 22 July, at the Junction Oval. The St Kilda team were so late taking the field that some thought they were not going to play at all. Apart from Wels Eicke, the St Kilda team were hopeless. Heckled, booed, and taunted by the crowd after the match as he was leaving the ground, the St Kilda captain of the day, Harry Lever, had to be restrained from climbing the fence and dealing with the barrackers. Parker's hopes for a fourth match were no doubt dashed by his elementary error of mistaking the behind posts for the goal posts:

[One bright feature of an otherwise dismal day] was the ludicrous mistake made by Parker, a St. Kilda forward, who was so entirely alone when he got the ball in front that he might have crawled to the goal line, but who from the distance of a few yards mistook the opening and kicked a behind, amidst much shouting.

— The Argus, Monday, 24 July 1911.

== Oarsman ==
He was a well known oarsman, and was a member of the Civil Service Rowing Club.

== Military service ==
Prior to his enlistment on 11 October 1915, Parker had 3½ years experience in the Citizen's Military Force.

Parker was promoted to Second Lieutenant on 21 February 1916.

== Death ==
He was badly wounded in action with the 37th Infantry Battalion of the 3rd Division of the AIF, during a trench raid in France on the night of 29 January 1917, when he was struck in the groin by German machine gun fire.

He was lying in a shell hole, and was too badly wounded to be carried back to the Australian lines. The entire stretcher party that had gone to retrieve him were shot down before they could reach the shell-hole; and, by the time a patrolling party could reach the site, Parker was no longer there.

He was taken prisoner by the Germans, and was admitted to the Bavarian Field Hospital, Lambersart, Lille, France. He died of his wounds in the German hospital the next day.

== Remembrance ==
Buried at the Rue-Petillon Military Cemetery, Fleurbaix, France, Parker is commemorated in a two-panel memorial window installed at St. Johns Uniting Church, at the corner of Mount Alexander Road and Buckley Street, Essendon ("In Loving Memory of Lieut Harold Carlyle Parker, 27th Battln, Died of wounds within the German Lines at Armentieres, 30th Jany 1917, aged 25 years. Thy Will be done".).

== See also ==
- List of Victorian Football League players who died on active service
