= Elsternwick =

- Suburb
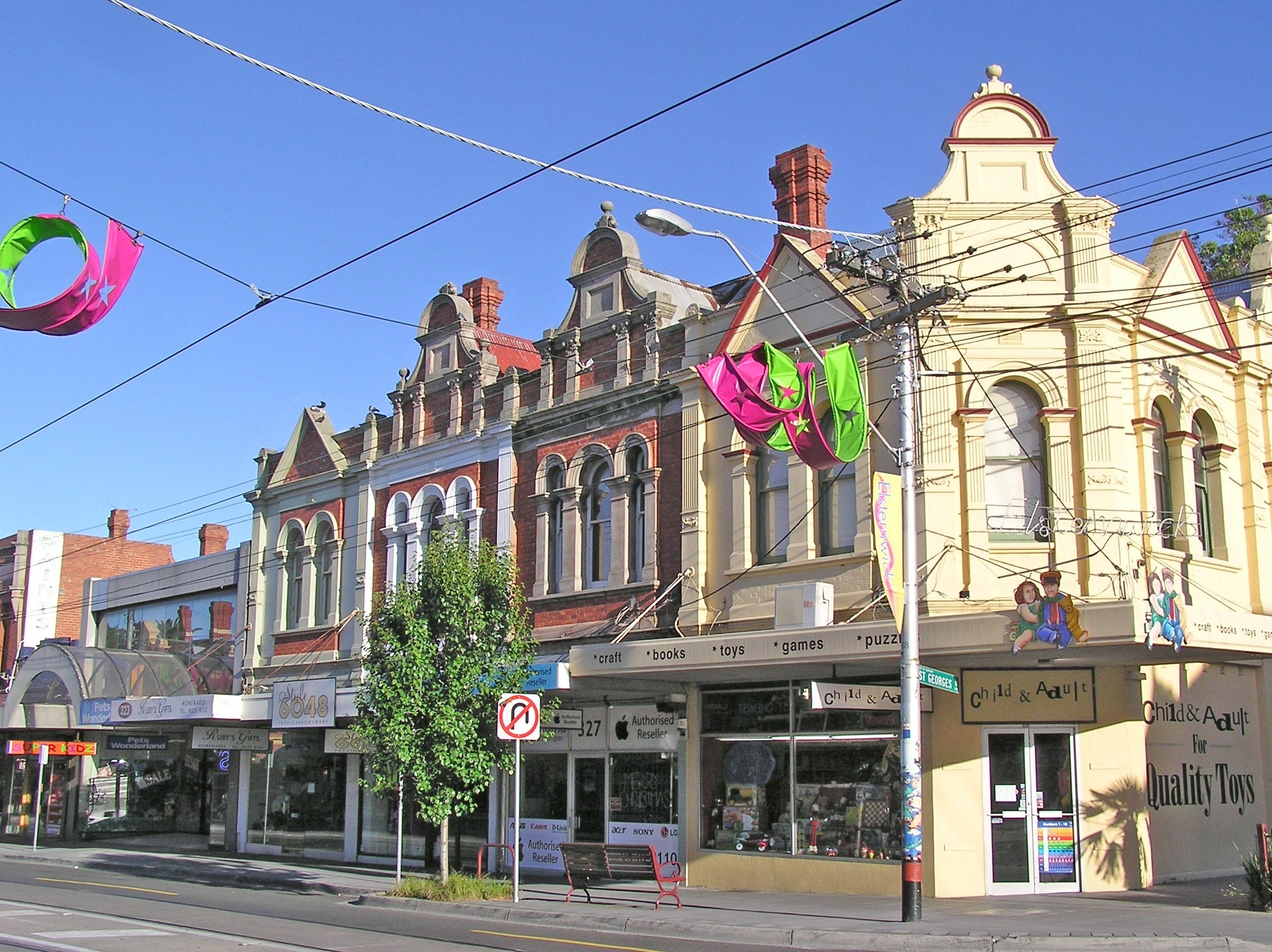
- Victorian shopfronts on the corner of Glen Huntly & St Georges Roads

- Interactive map of Elsternwick
- Coordinates: 37.887°S 145.006°E
- Country: Australia
- State: Victoria
- City: Melbourne
- LGA: City of Glen Eira
- Location: 9 km (5.6 mi) from Melbourne; 3 km (1.9 mi) from Port Phillip; 2 km (1.2 mi) from Caulfield Racecourse
- Established: 1861

Government
  - State electorate: Caulfield
  - Federal divisions: Goldstein; Macnamara

Area
  - Total: 2.6 km^{2} (1.0 sq mi)
- Elevation: 26 m (85 ft)

Population
  - Total: 10,887 (2021 census)
  - Density: 4,190/km^{2} (10,850/sq mi)
- Postcode: 3185
Suburbs around Elsternwick
| Elwood | St Kilda East | Caulfield North |
| Ripponlea, Brighton | Elsternwick | Caulfield |
| Brighton | Gardenvale | Caulfield South |

Elsternwick is an inner suburb in Melbourne, Victoria, Australia, 9 km south-east of Melbourne's Central Business District, located within the City of Glen Eira local government area. Elsternwick recorded a population of 10,887 at the 2021 census.

== Administrative division ==
In terms of its cadastral division, Elsternwick is in the parish of Prahran within the County of Bourke.

== Location ==
Elsternwick is bounded by the Nepean Highway, Elster Avenue, Kooyong Road, Glen Eira Road, and Hotham Street (the continuation of Williams Road).

Formerly Elsternwick covered the area located in the City of Bayside bounded by Head/Bridge Street, Nepean Highway, Glen Huntly Road and St. Kilda Street. This includes the cricket ground (originally the home of the Elsternwick Cricket Club) and currently known as the Sportscover Arena. It is located within the larger area known as Elsternwick Park – located at the junction of the Nepean Highway and Glen Huntly Road – as is the former Elsternwick Park Golf Course.

== First Nations Country ==
Elsternwick is a part of the Boonwurrung country, an Aboriginal people of the Kulin nation, who are the traditional owners of the land from the Werribee River to Wilsons Promontory in the Australian state of Victoria. Their territory includes part of what is now the city and suburbs of Melbourne. They were called the Western Port or Port Philip tribe by the early settlers, and were in alliance with other tribes in the Kulin nation, having particularly strong ties to the Wurundjeri people.

== Name ==
Similarly to how Ripponlea took its name from the Rippon Lea Estate of Sir Frederick Sargood, Elsternwick took its name from the largest property in the district: Charles Ebden's house Elster (elster is German for 'magpie'). The area was previously known as Red Bluff.

The creek nearby became known as the Elster Creek; and, when a village grew up on the creek, the Anglo-Saxon suffix 'wick', meaning village, was added.

== History ==
The Elsternwick village was proposed in 1851. Elsternwick was originally situated across three municipalities - Caulfield, Brighton and St Kilda. At the end of the 1880s unsuccessful attempts were made for Elsternwick to become administratively independent. Today it is in the Local Government Area of the City of Glen Eira. The postcode is 3185.

Elsternwick village was surveyed in 1856, and Elsternwick Post Office opened on 22 June 1860.

In 1861 a railway line, operated by the Melbourne & Hobson's Bay Railway Company, was built from Melbourne to Brighton which included a railway station at Elsternwick. The first site of Caulfield Grammar School, founded in 1881, was adjacent to the Elsternwick railway station.

In the 1880s, Elsternwick railway station was also the Melbourne end of the railway line to the large-scale sugar beet processing mill at Rosstown (see Rosstown Railway) – now known as Carnegie – and beyond. This railway was seldom used, and it ceased to function in 1916.

A tramline was opened along Glen Huntly Road in 1889. Another tramline, running between Elsternwick and Point Ormond, was opened on 4 June 1915, and was closed on 22 October 1960.

The ABC studios in Melbourne were located in Gordon Street. The studios were built during the 1950s and 1960s and were decommissioned in 2017. Many programs were filmed and produced in the studios, such as Countdown, Recovery and Adam Hills in Gordon Street Tonight.

== Today ==
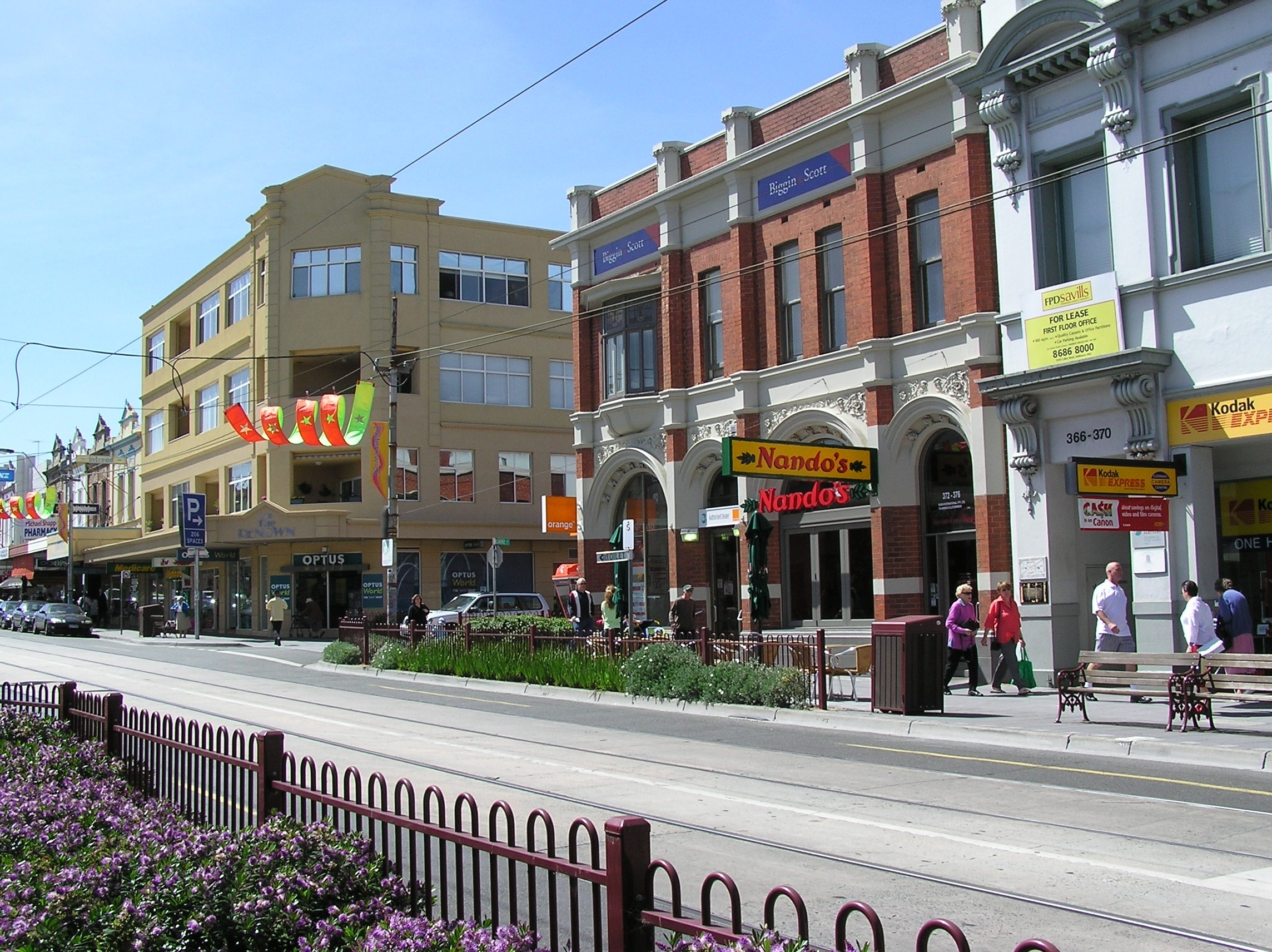
Shopping strip of Glen Huntly Road

Glen Huntly Road in Elsternwick has a variety of cafés and restaurants. Elsternwick was the home of perhaps the best-known brothel in Australia, and certainly Melbourne; Daily Planet, which was the first in the world to be listed on a stock exchange (the Australian Securities Exchange).

Hattam (Mens and Boys Wear) Stores, at 383 Glenhuntly Road, a long, narrow shop, is one of the last locations in Australia that still has a Lamson "Rapid Wire" Cash Carrier in place; it connects three locations in the lower section of the shop with the central cashier's desk.

The 2017 season of The Block was filmed in Regent Street.

== Population ==
In the 2016 Census, there were 10,349 people in Elsternwick. 65.3% of people were born in Australia. The next most common countries of birth were England 3.9%, New Zealand 1.9%, India 1.7%, South Africa 1.7% and China 1.5%. 73.0% of people spoke only English at home. Other languages spoken at home included Greek 2.6%, Hebrew 2.0%, Russian 1.9%, Yiddish 1.8% and Mandarin 1.7%. The most common responses for religion were No Religion 35.5%, Catholic 18.0%, and Judaism 17.8%.

== Transport ==
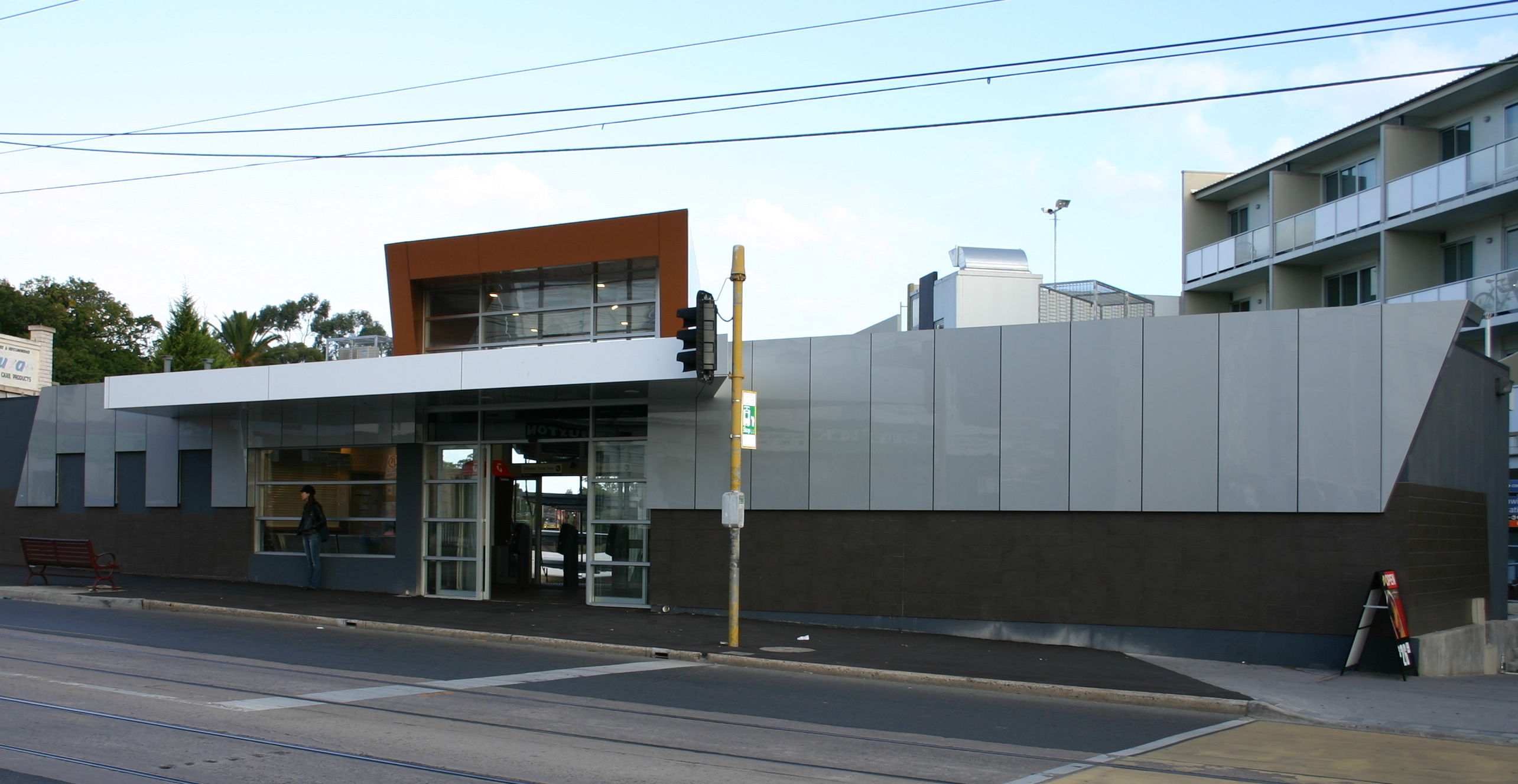
Elsternwick station

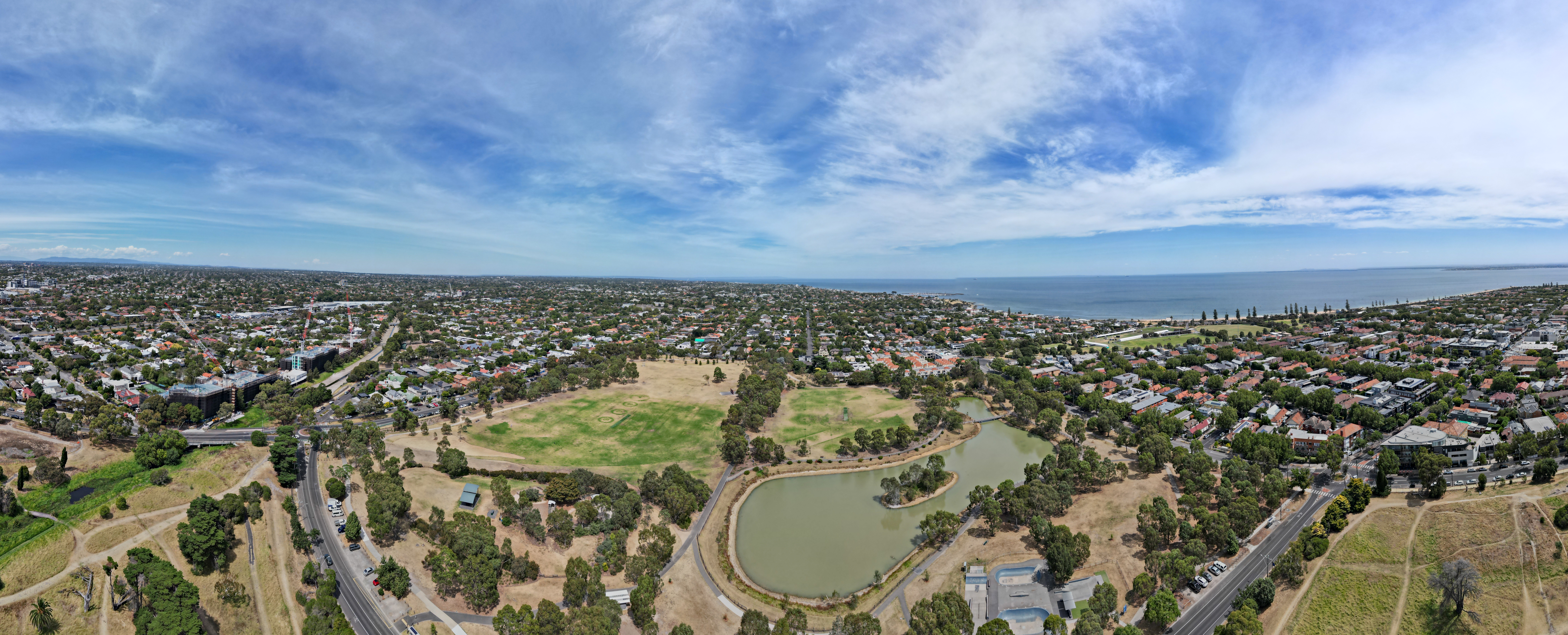
Aerial panorama of Elsternwick Park and Port Philip Bay. Shot February 2023.

Elsternwick railway station on the Sandringham railway line is located on Riddell Parade next to Glen Huntly Road. For a number of years (in the late 1800s and early 1900s) it was also where the Rosstown Railway linked up with the Sandringham railway line.

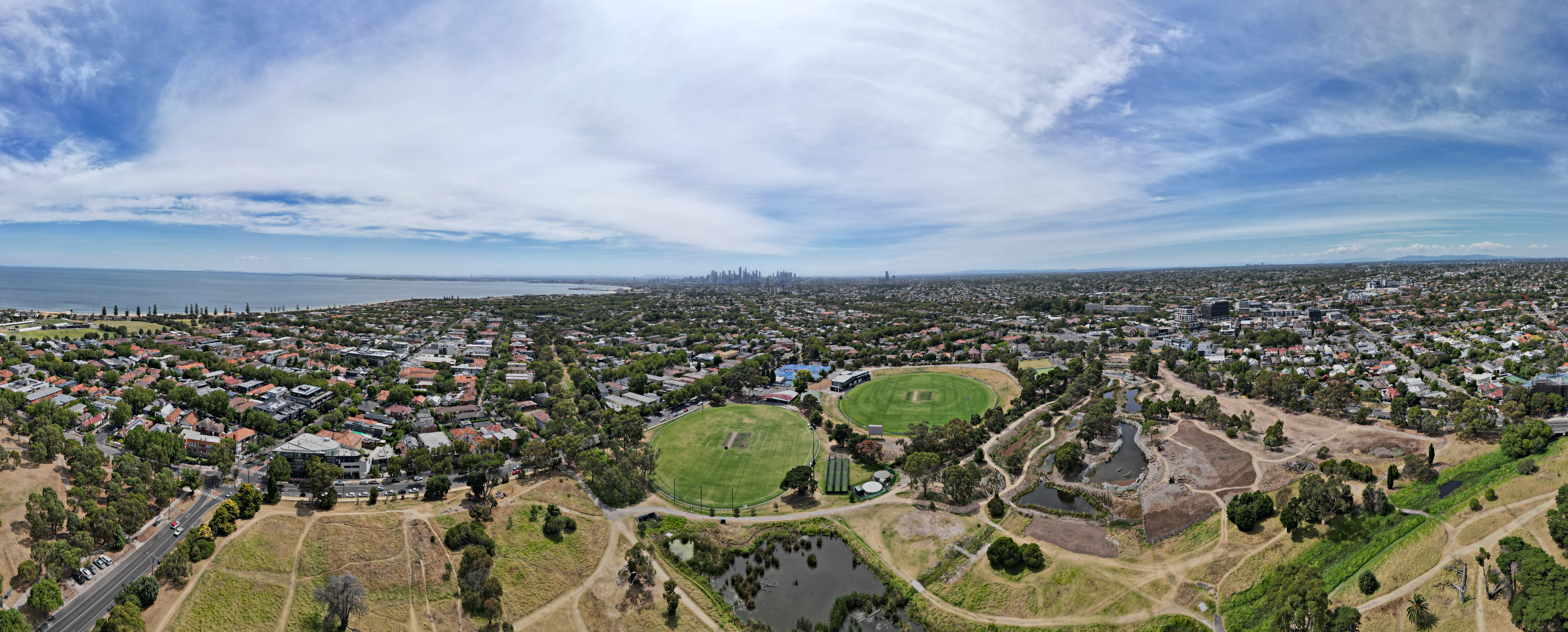
Elsternwick Park Aerial panorama with Yalukit Willam Nature Reserve and the Cricket Club in the frame.

Melbourne tram route 67 links Elsternwick to the Melbourne city centre. It travels along Glen Huntly Road from Carnegie, through Glen Huntly and Caulfield South to Elsternwick and, then, via Brighton Road and St Kilda Road to the CBD, via Swanston Street. It terminates at the University of Melbourne.

== Sport ==
The Elsternwick Club Sandham St est 1919 includes Lawn Bowls on Tiff Dwarf green and various function rooms.

The Elsternwick Cricket Club was founded in August 1901. The Elsternwick Main Oval, now known as Sportscover Arena or Elsternwick Park, was established shortly after the club's foundation. The 'Wickas', as the club is affectionately known, plays in the Victorian Sub-District Cricket Association.

Golfers played at Elsternwick Park Golf Club, also known as Royal Elsternwick, on Glen Huntly Road until 2018, when the course closed to be used as passive open space.

The Elsternwick Croquet Club, founded in 1911, is situated in the Hopetoun Gardens.

== Schools ==
=== State Schools ===
The Elsternwick Primary School – once officially located in "Brickwood Street, Elsternwick" – is now, without any shift in its physical position, officially located in Murphy Street, Brighton. Consequently, the suburb currently has no government schools.

=== Private Schools ===
- Wesley College - Elsternwick Campus (formerly: Methodist Ladies' College and Cato College)
- Leibler Yavneh College
- St Joseph's Primary School

== Heritage sites ==
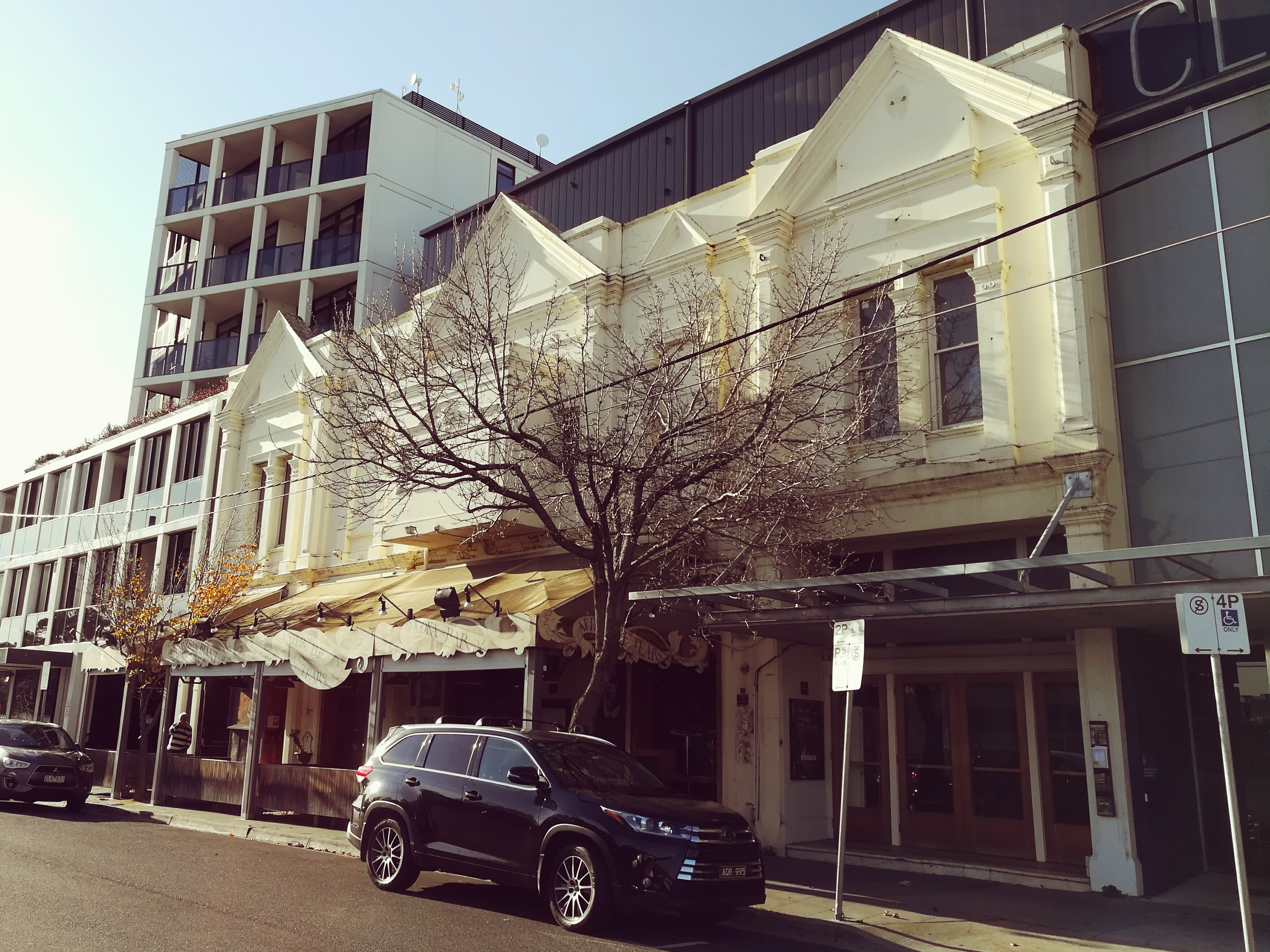
Classic Cinemas

Built as a public hall in 1888 and converted into a cinema in 1911, Classic Cinemas is claimed to be Melbourne's oldest continuously running cinema.

Elsternwick contains a number of heritage-listed sites, including:

- 192 Hotham Street: Rippon Lea Estate
- 2-4 Selwyn Street: Elsternwick Metropolitan Fire Brigade Station
- 84-86 Orrong Road: Union Church
- 6-8 Rusden Street: Elsternwick Tram Substation
- 296-298 Glenhuntly Road & 1A-1B Riddell Parade: Elsternwick Post Office

== Notable people ==
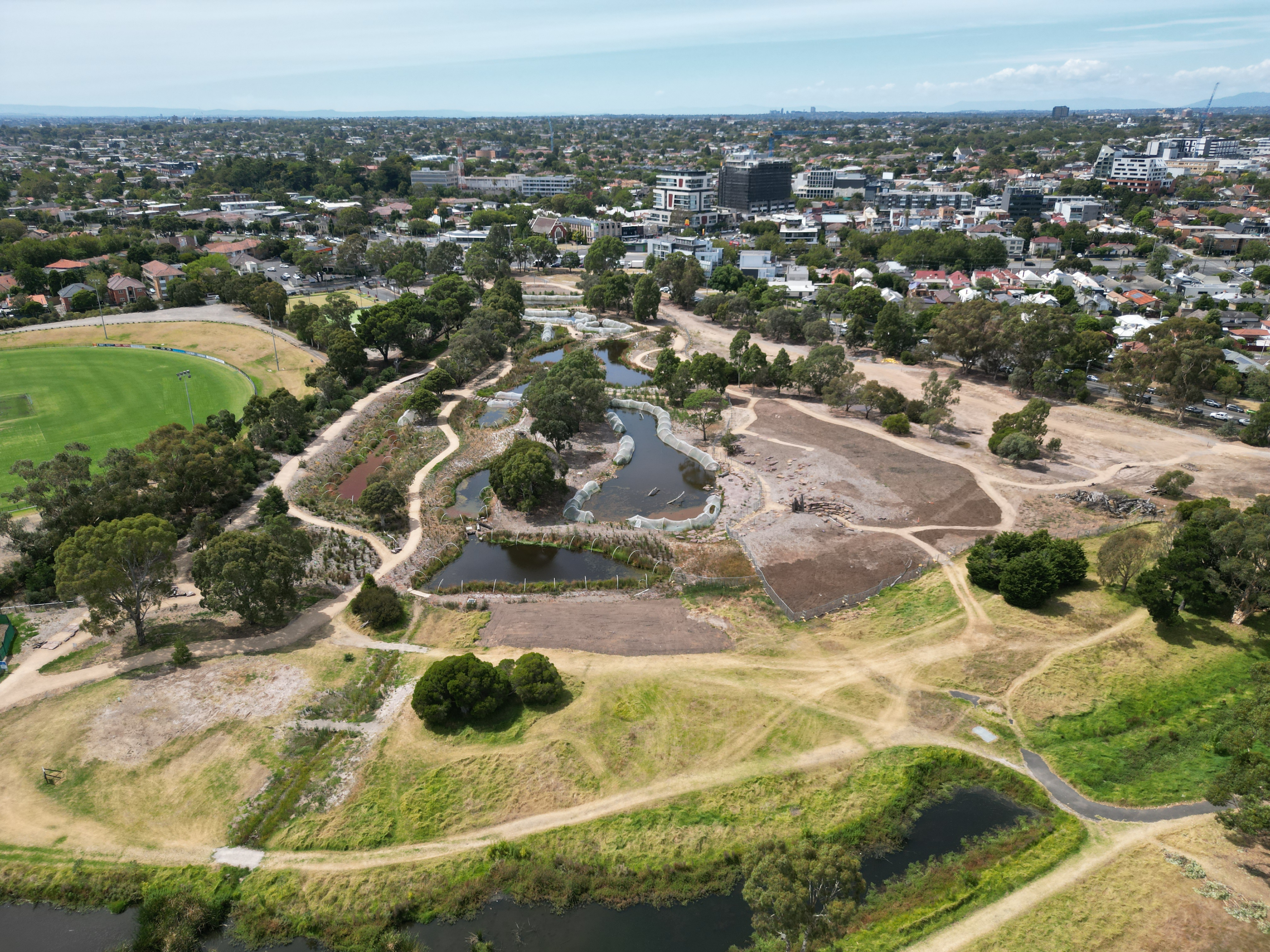
Aerial perspective of Yalukit Willam Nature Reserve

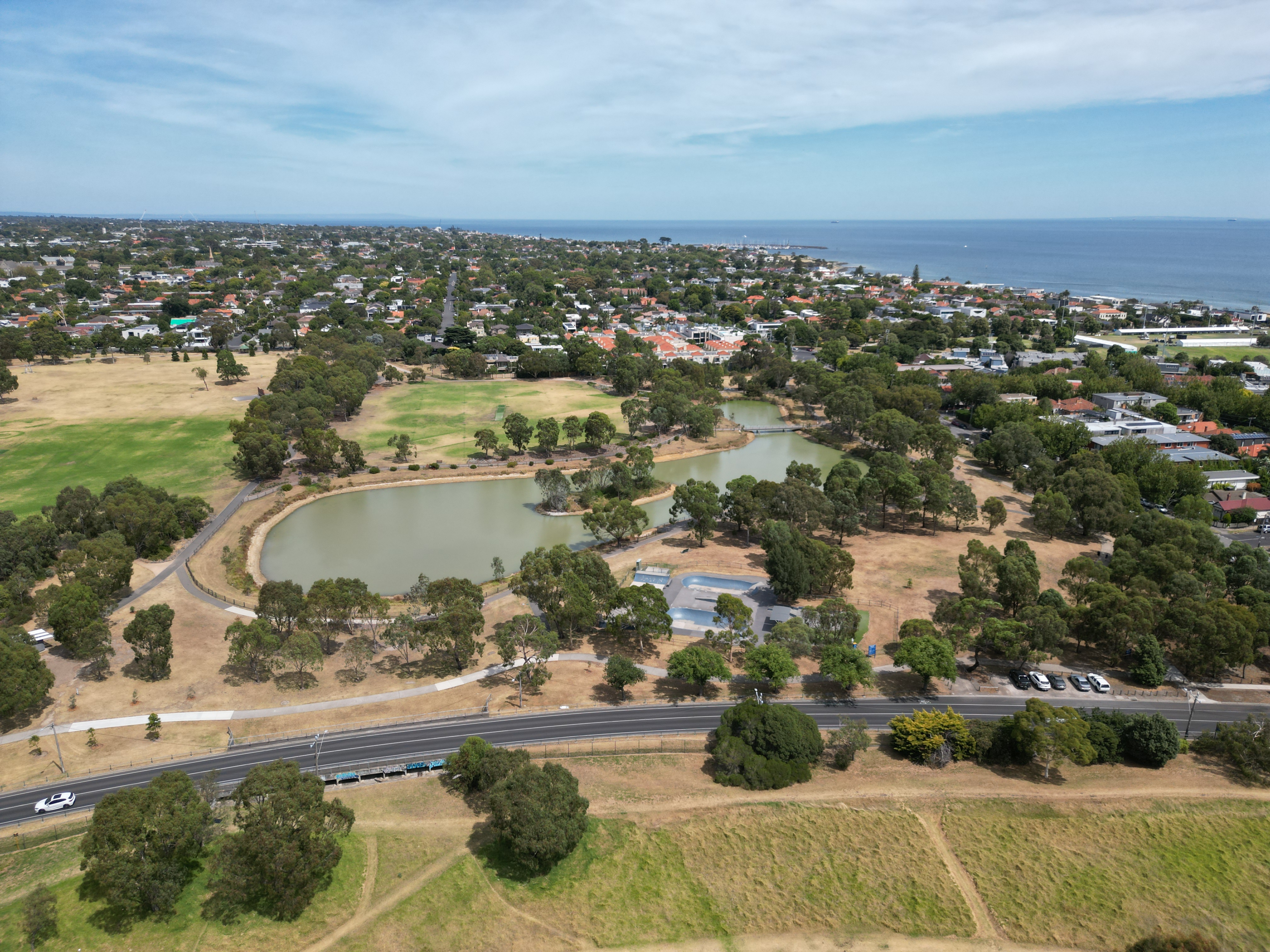
Aerial perspective of the lake at Elsternwick Park

- Hildred Butler (1906–1975), microbiologist, born in Elsternwick
- Joan Chambers, née Murray (1930–2016), Member of the Victorian Legislative Assembly, born in Elsternwick.
- "Chris" Christiansen (1913–2007), radio astronomer and electrical engineer, grew up in Elsternwick.
- Ben Cousins (1978–), former AFL footballer.
- Moira Dynon, née Shelton (1920–1976), welfare worker and scientist, born in Elsternwick.
- Joyce Evans (1929–2019), photographer, artist, gallery director, born in Elsternwick.
- Ray Groom (1944–), lawyer, sportsman, and politician, 39th Premier of Tasmania, born in Elsternwick.
- Joy St. Clair Hester (1920–1960), artist, born in Elsternwick.
- Sir Edwin William Hicks (1910–1984), public servant and diplomat, born in Elsternwick.
- Edward Honey (1885–1922), journalist, born in Elsternwick, suggested the "Two-minute silence" observed on 11 November each year.
- Dave Hughes (1970–), comedian; purchased a house built on The Block 2017.
- Les Johnson (1908–January 1942), Essendon and North Melbourne Footballer, killed in action in World War II, born in Elsternwick.
- William Joynt VC (1889–1986), soldier, printer and publisher, born in Elsternwick.
- Geoffrey Lemprière OBE (1904–1977), woolbuyer and soldier, born in Elsternwick.
- Samuel Mauger (1857–1936), reformer, manufacturer, politician, died in Elsternwick.
- Keith Miller (1919–2004), a resident of Elsternwick in his childhood.
- Enid Moodie-Heddle (1904–1991), poet and children's author, born in Elsternwick.
- Sir Alister Murdoch (1912–1984), air force officer, born in Elsternwick.
- Harold Parker (1892–1917), St Kilda footballer, killed in First World War.
- Bill Ponsford (1900–1991), a resident in the 1920s and 1930s.
- Peter Rowsthorn (1963–), actor and comedian.
- Roy Schilling (1896–1979), politician, died in Elsternwick.
- Percival Serle (1871–1951), accountant, biographer, and bibliographer, born in Elsternwick.
- George Strickland (1942–), Member of the Western Australian Legislative Assembly, born in Elsternwick.
- Frederick Taylor (1810–1872), squatter and mass murderer.
- Richard Toutcher (1861–1941), politician, died in Elsternwick.
- Sir Alexander George Wales (1885–1962), businessman, politician, Lord Mayor of Melbourne, died in Elsternwick.
- Charlie Watts (1895–1965), soldier and cleric, born in Elsternwick.
- Harry Llewellyn Williams (1915–1961), champion golfer, born in Elsternwick.

== Residential architecture ==
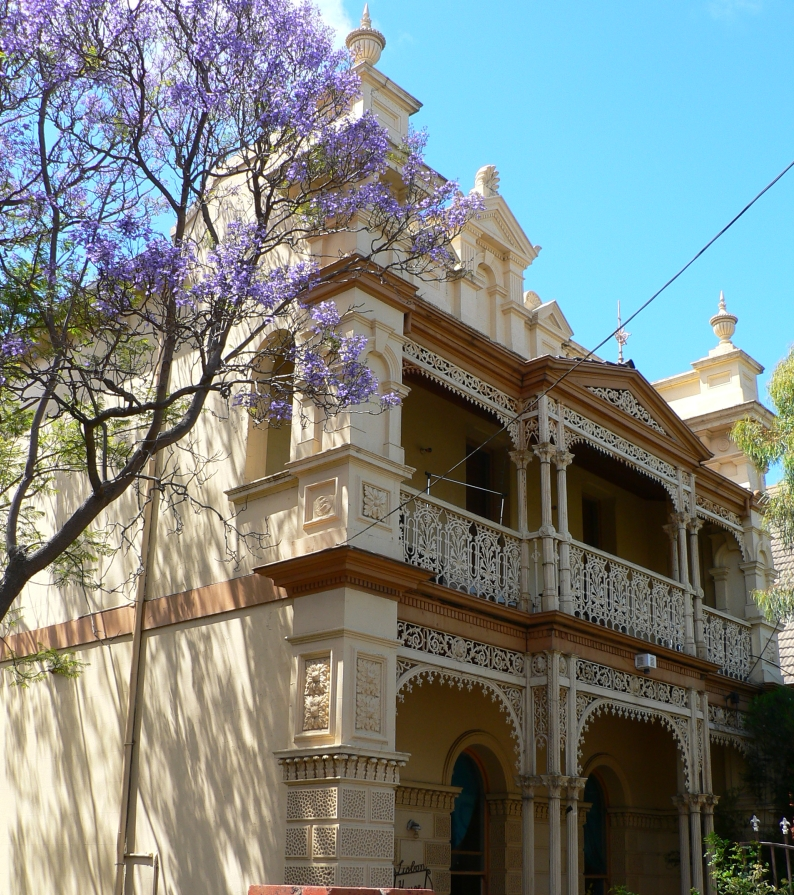
"Lisbon House", 70 Orrong Road, is a grand Victorian terrace home.

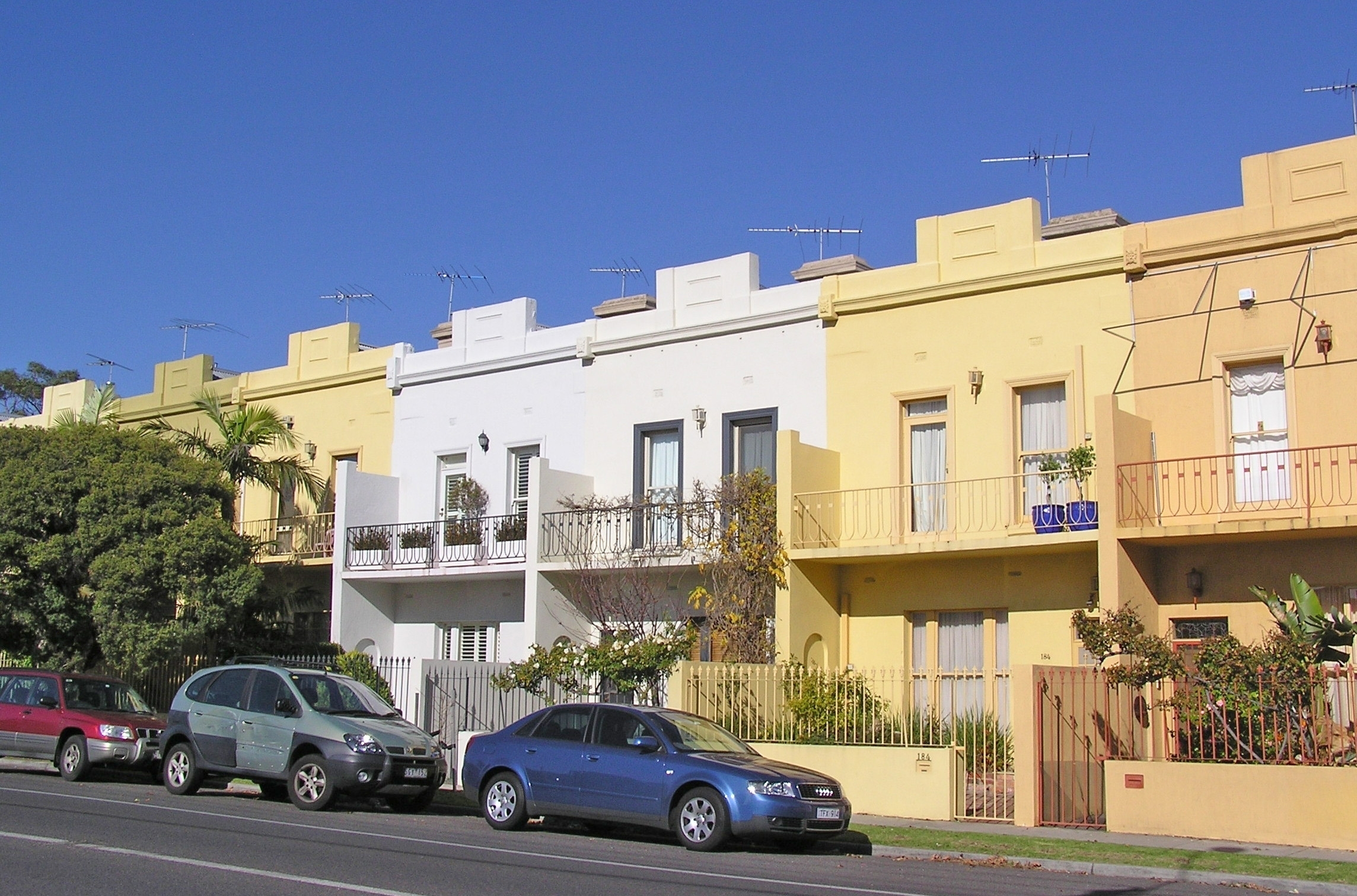
1930s remodelled Victorian terraces, Glen Eira Road (opposite Caulfield Grammar School)

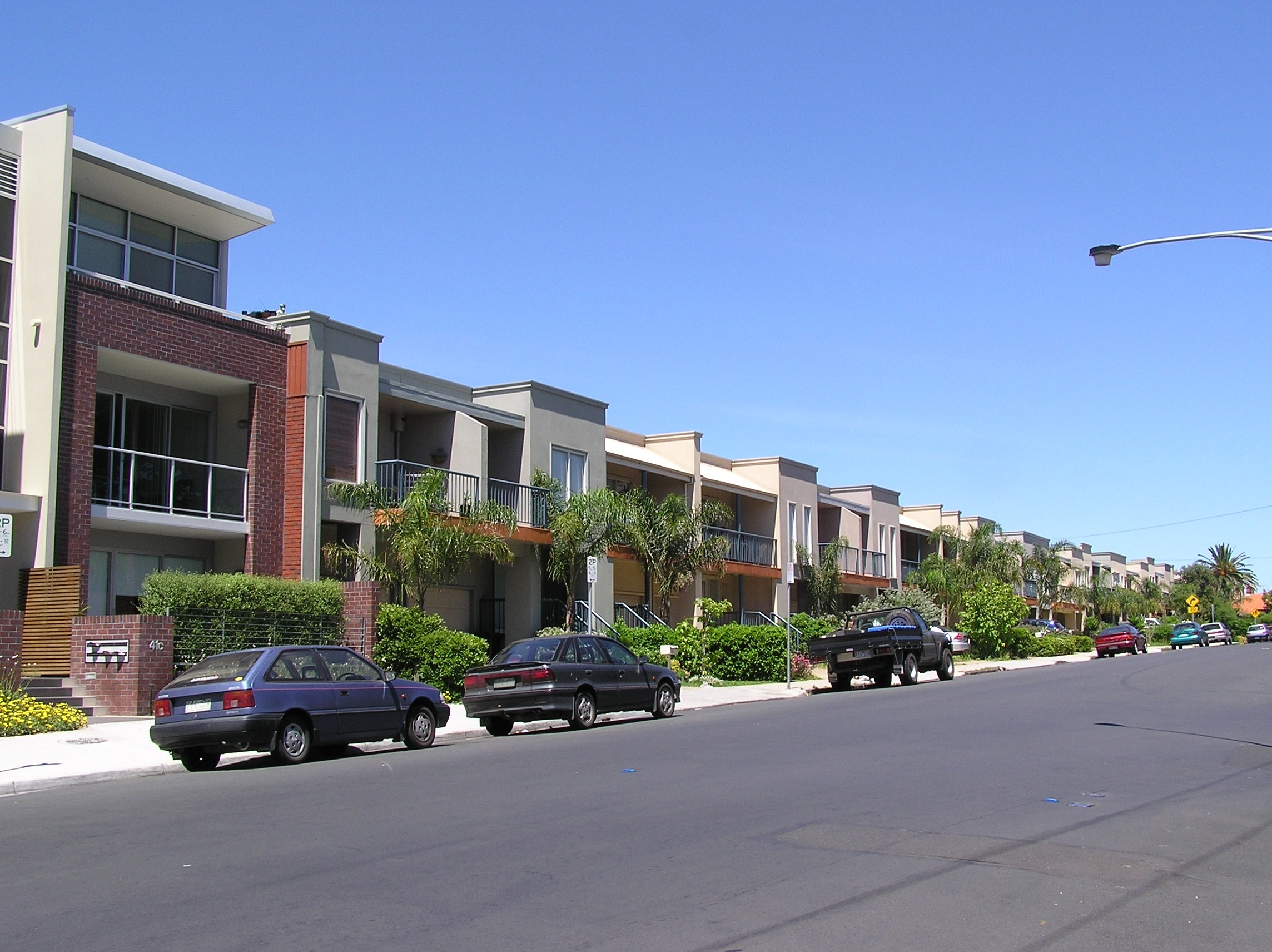
Elsternwick railway station warehouses converted to townhouses and apartment in Horne Street

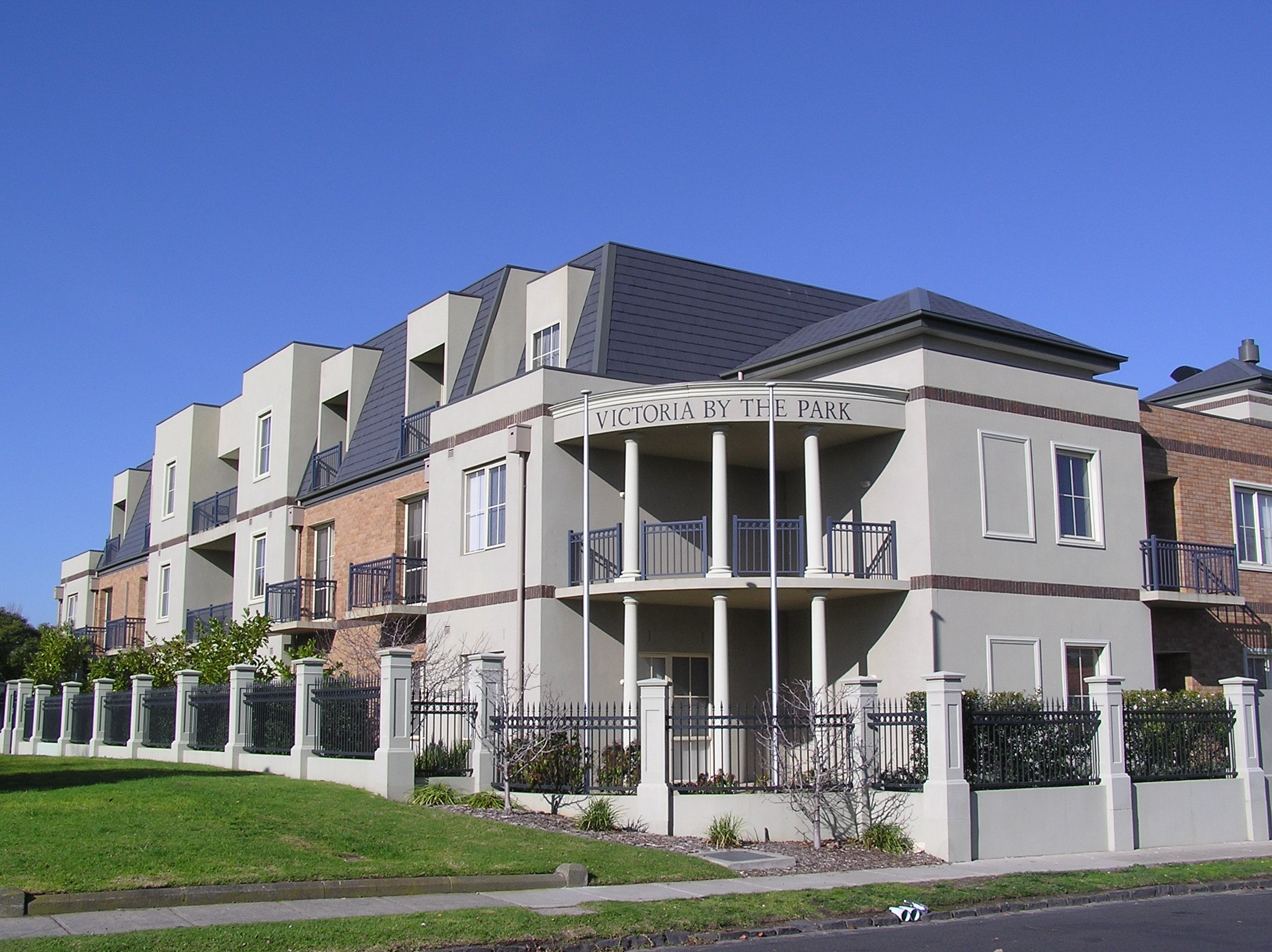
Elsternwick Retirement Apartment (Victoria by the Park) next to Hopetoun Gardens

== Non-residential architecture ==
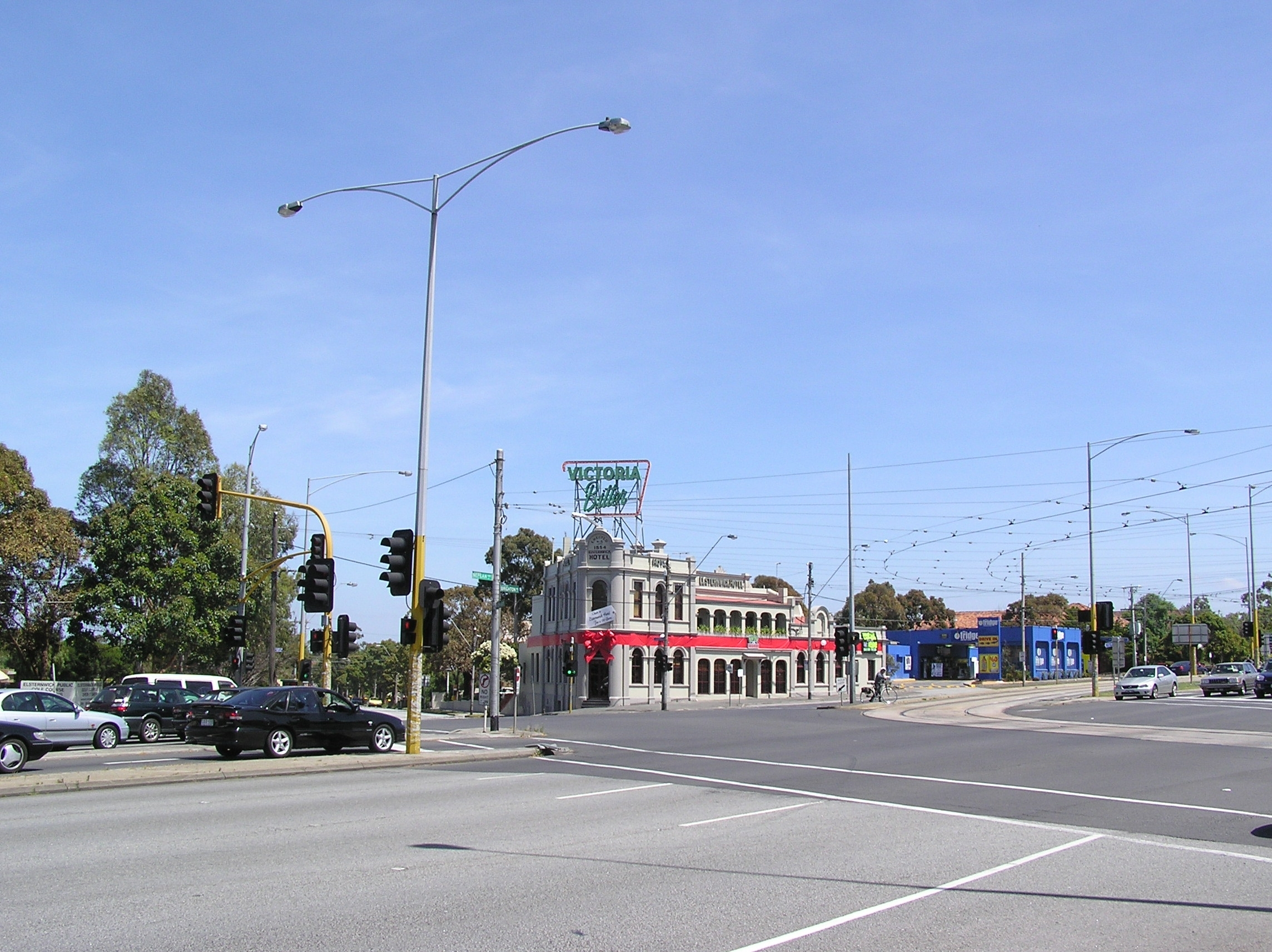
The Elsternwick Hotel (built 1856), corner of Glen Huntly and Brighton Roads

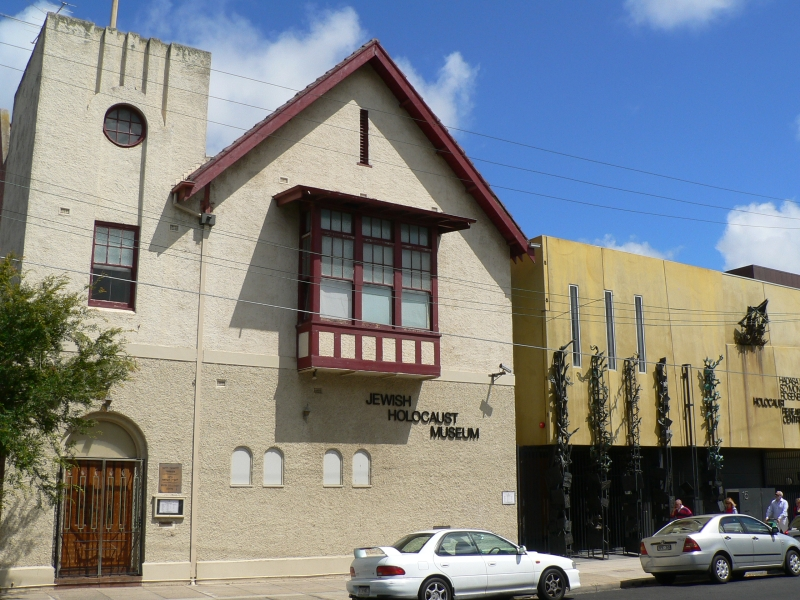
Jewish Holocaust Museum, Selwyn Street

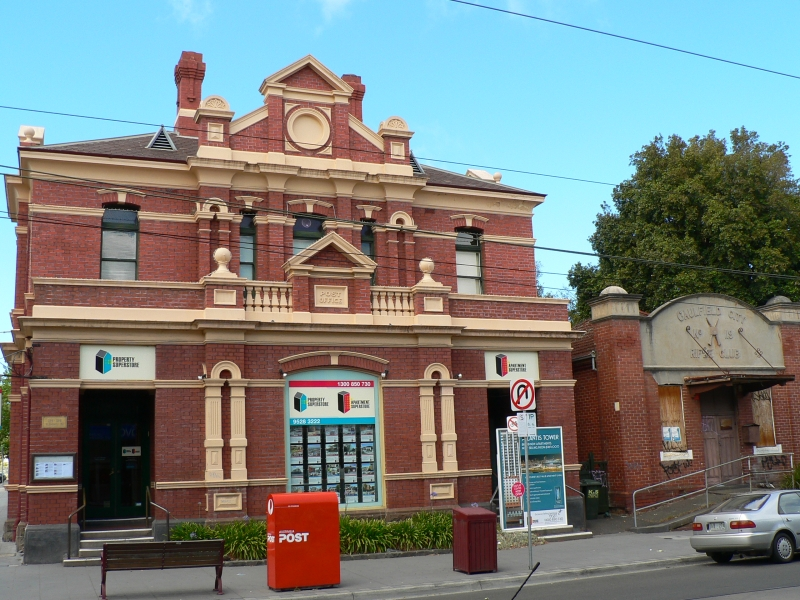
Former Elsternwick Post Office and former Caulfield City rifle club buildings

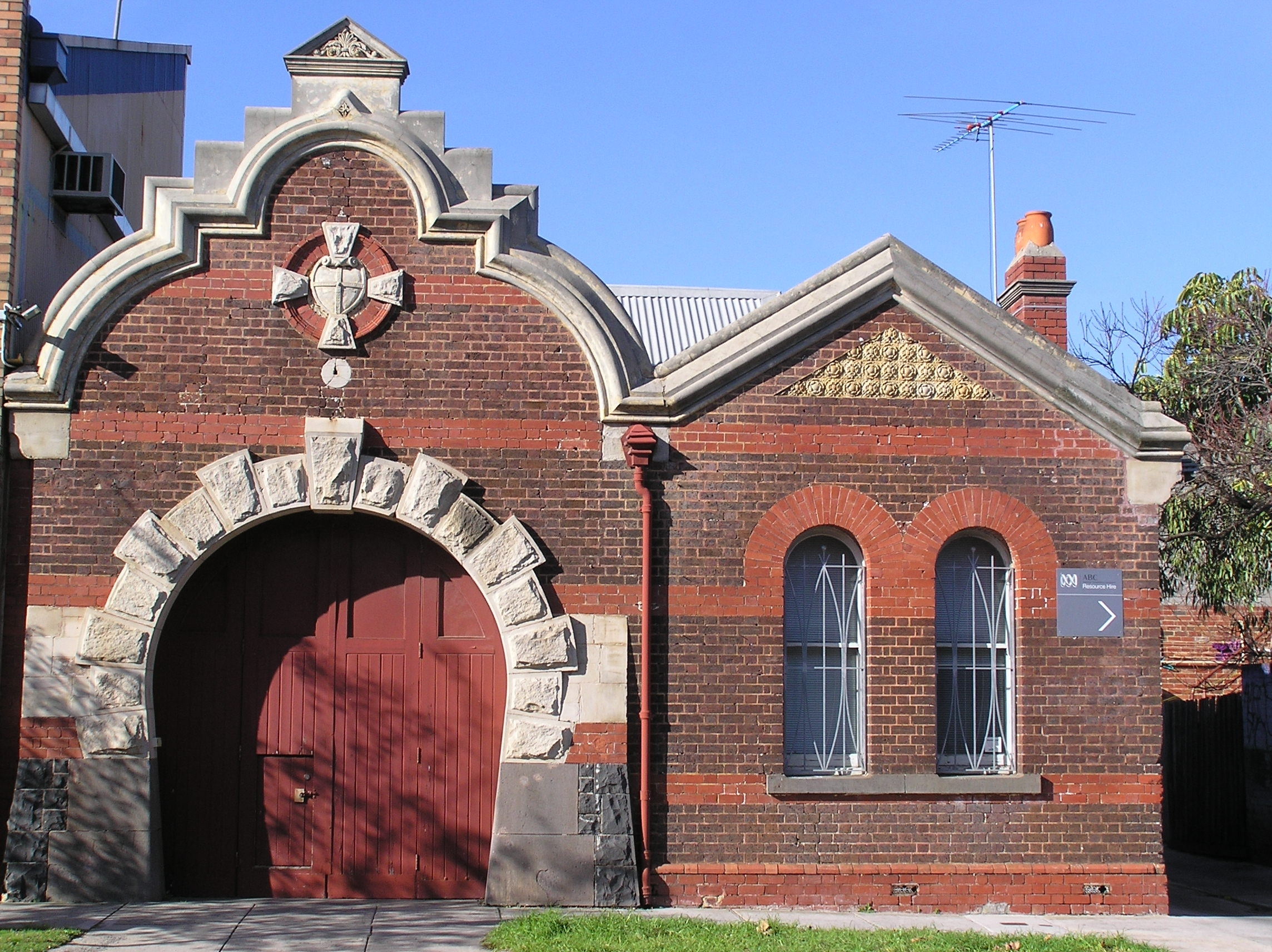
Former Elsternwick Fire Station

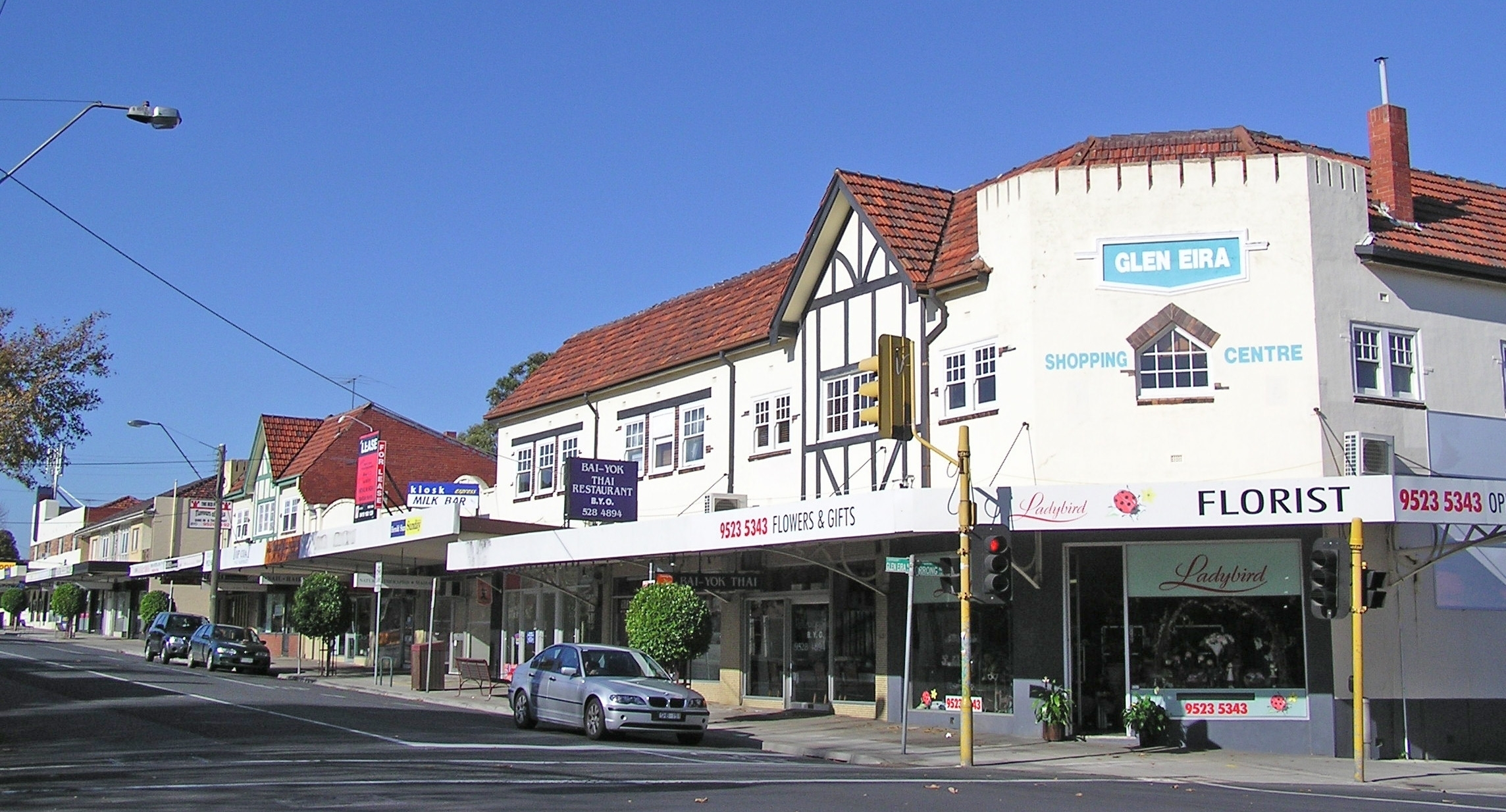
Tudor style dominates Glen Eira shopping village (Corner of Glen Eira & Orrong Roads) in Elsternwick

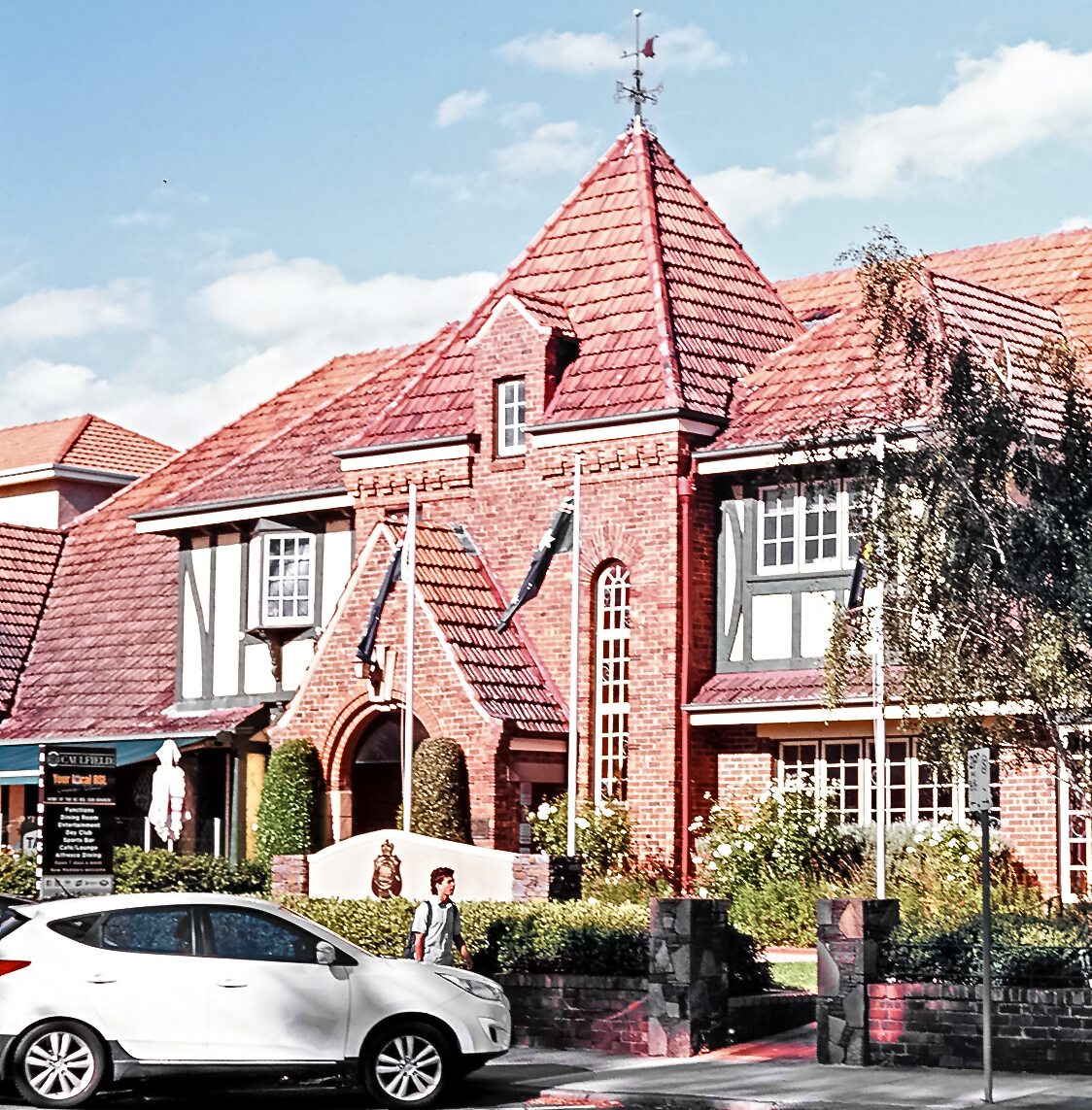
Rsl Elsternwick

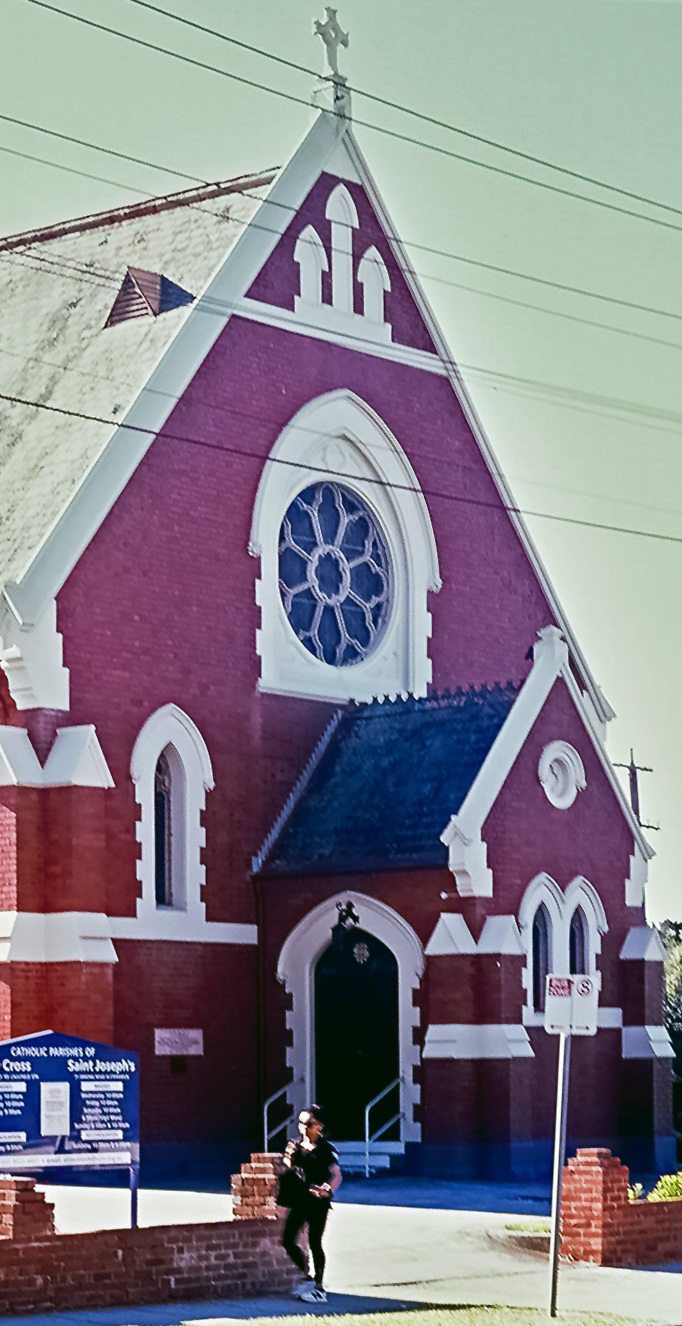
Elsternwick Catholic Church

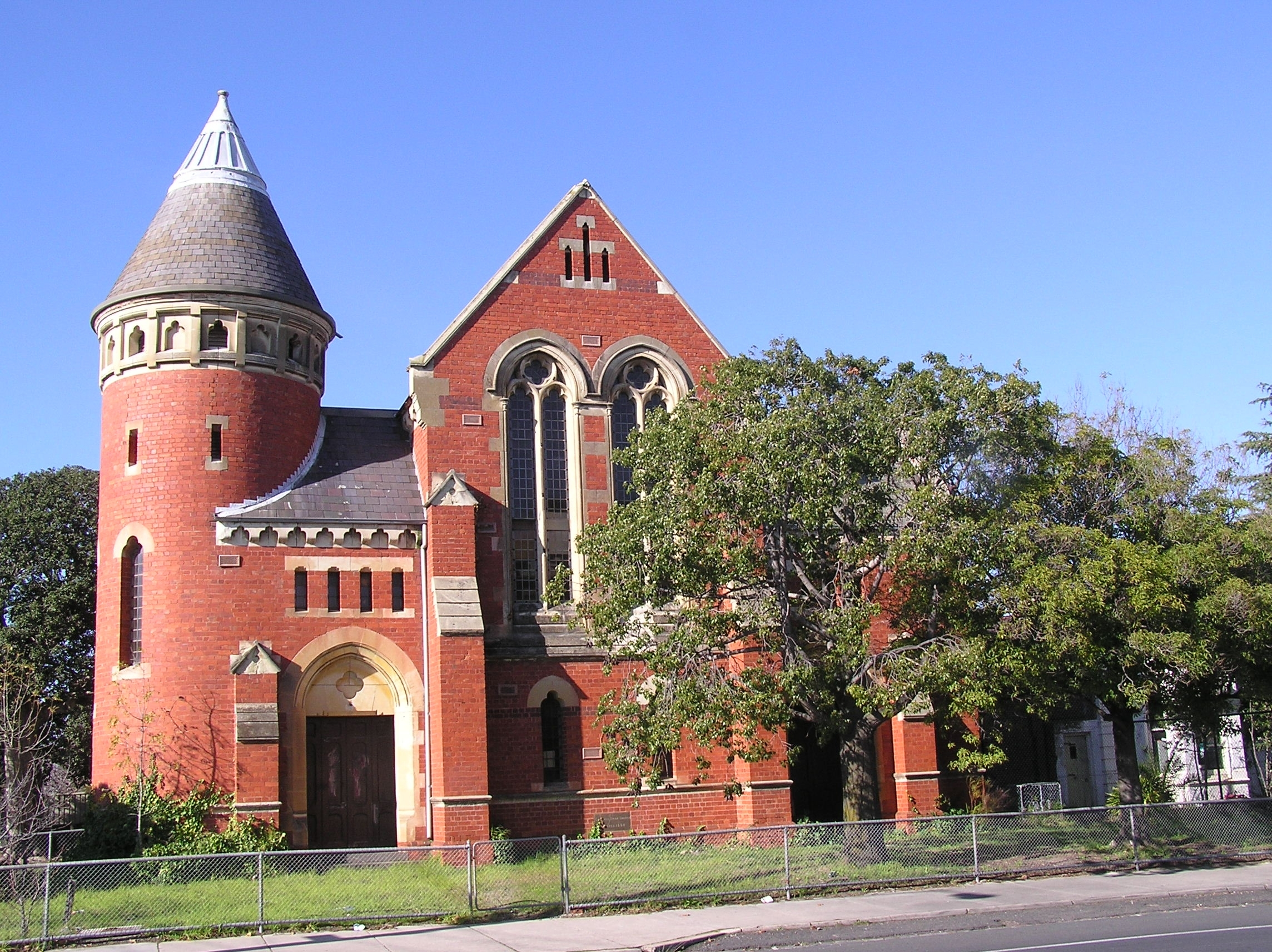
Congregational Church

== Open space ==
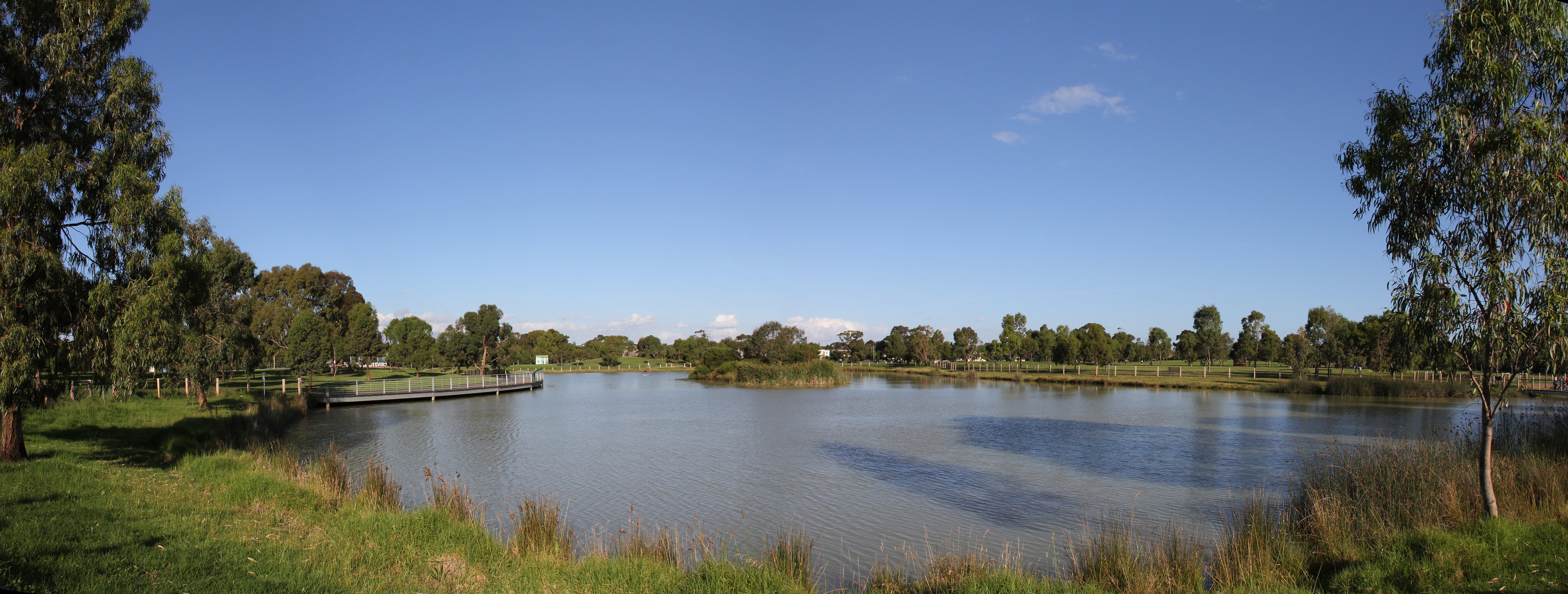
Elsternwick Park Golf Club

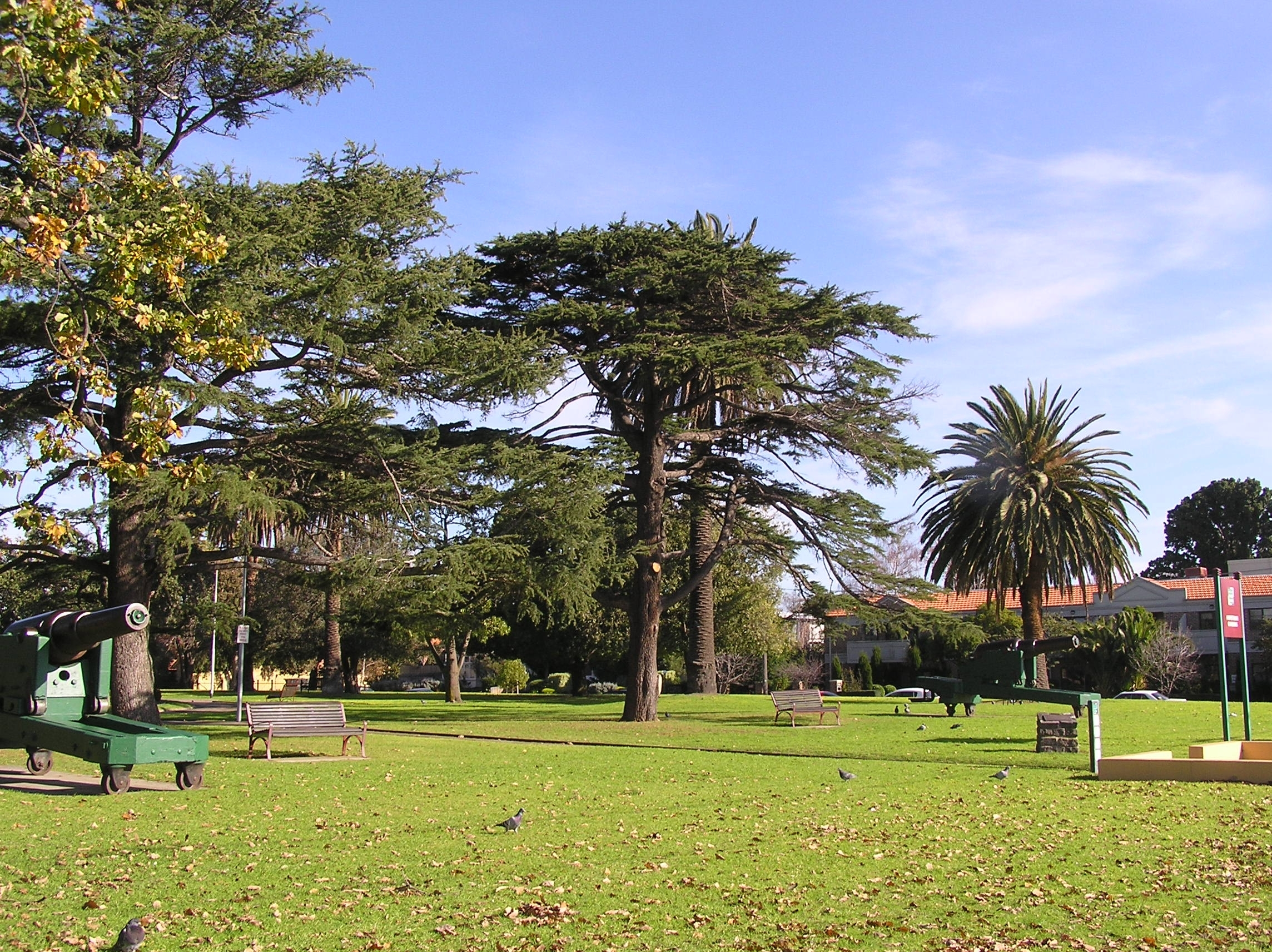
Elsternwick Hopetoun Gardens in Glen Huntly Road (cannons made in England 1866)

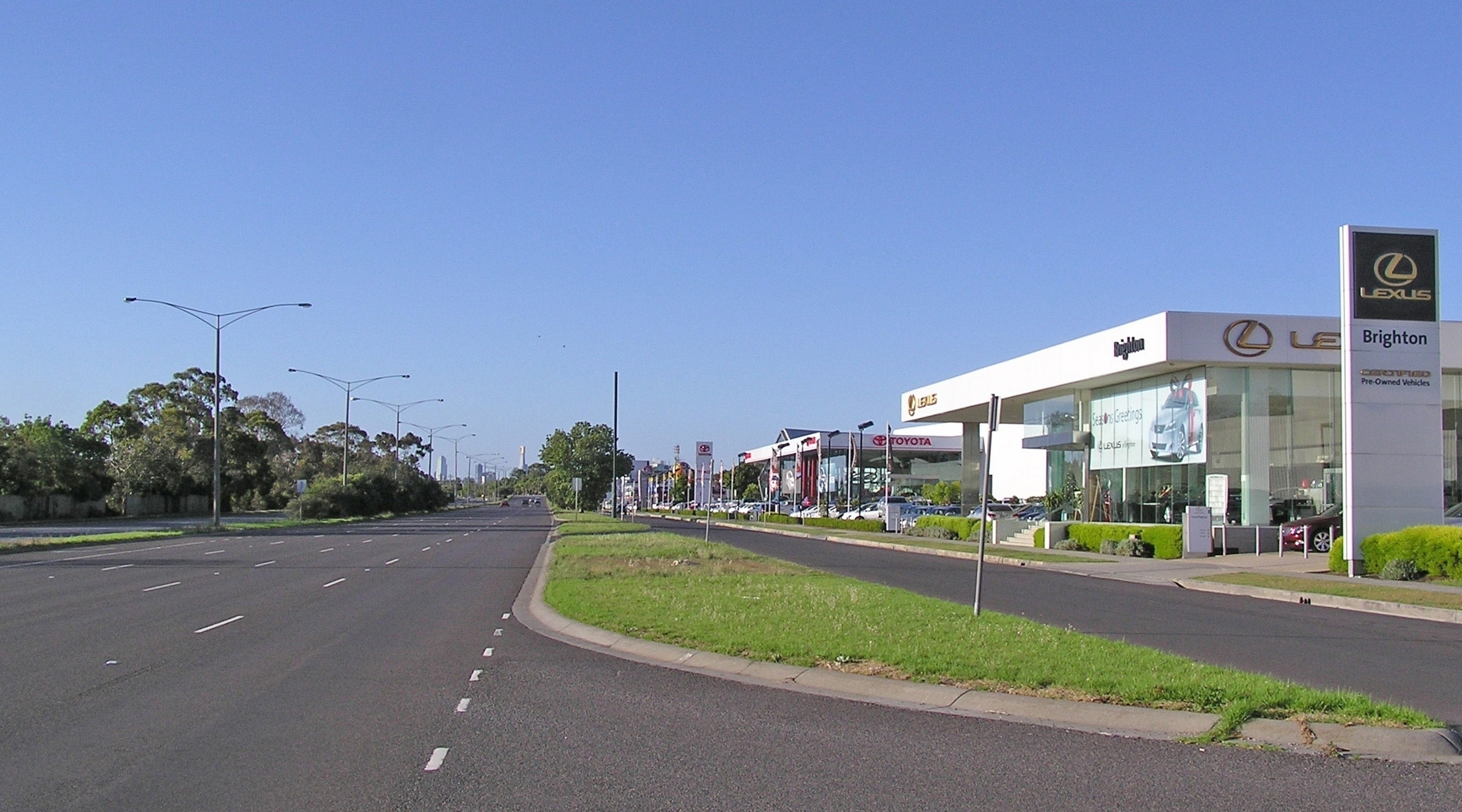
Nepean Highway in Elsternwick (9 km towards Melbourne CBD)

== See also ==
- City of Caulfield – Elsternwick was previously within this former local government area.
- Rosstown Railway
- Rosstown Railway Heritage Trail
