= Harold Parker (politician) =

American politician

Member of the New Hampshire House of Representatives from the Carroll 6th district
- In office 2014–2017

Personal details
- Party: Republican

Harold Parker is an American politician. A member of the Republican Party, he served in the New Hampshire House of Representatives from 2014 to 2017.
