= Harry Parker (swimmer) =

English swimmer

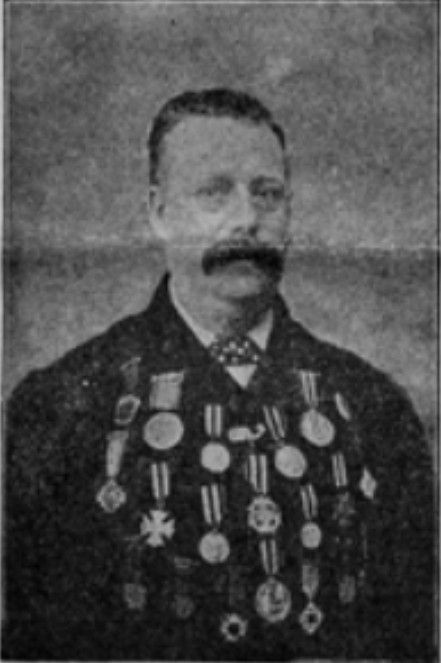
- Prof H Parker with medals from advertising when he was Swimming instructor at Ilfracombe in 1890s

Personal information
- Born: 1849 Ilfracombe, Great Britain
- Died: December 4, 1932 (aged 82–83)

Sport
- Sport: Swimming

Henry Parker (c. 1849 – 4 December 1932) was an English swimmer who won the amateur one-mile championship three consecutive times, from 1870 to 1872. These races were held on the River Thames, from Putney to Hammersmith.

By the 1890s, Parker was the lessee of the bathing pools at the Tunnels Beaches at Ilfracombe, where he was billed as an "expert swimmer and instructor" and "one of the foremost professors of ornamental swimming."

Harry's younger sister, Emily Parker, was also an accomplished swimmer.

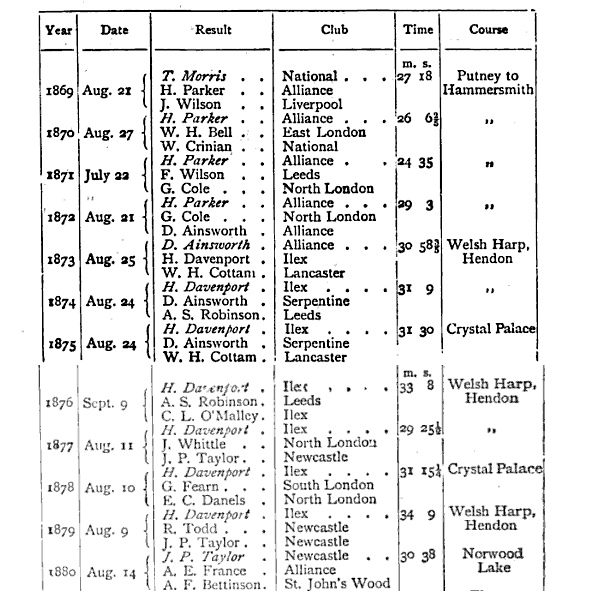
Winners of the amateur One Mile Championship Swim of England from 1869 through 1880. Parker won in 1870, 1871, and 1872, and came in second in 1869.

Harry and his wife Ellen's son, Henry Lloyd Parker, was also an accomplished swimmer and escapologist.
