= Henry H. Parker =

English painter

Henry Hillingford Parker (1858–1930) was an influential English landscape artist.

== Life and work ==
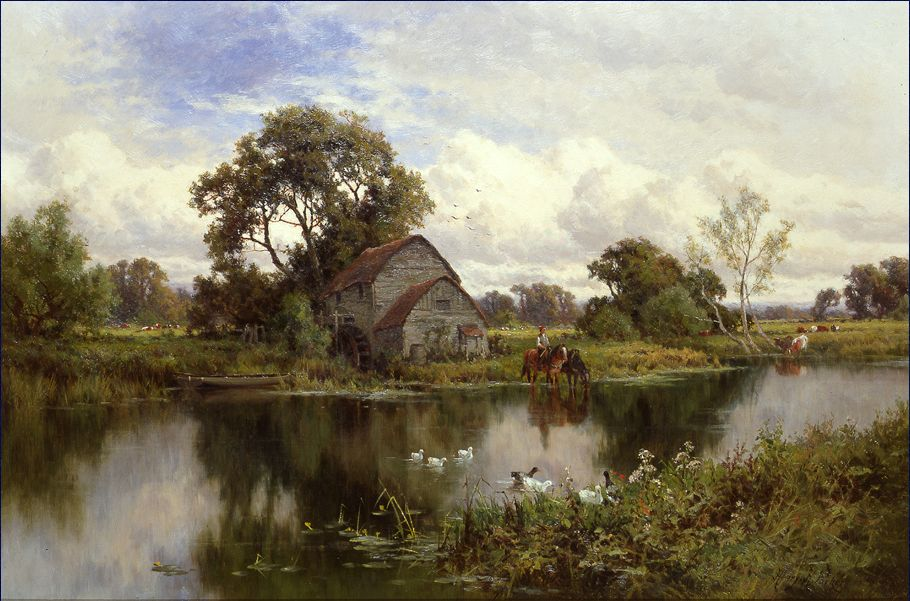
By the Mill (oil, on canvas)

Born in London, England, Parker spent most of his life there. He specialized in creating picturesque pastoral landscapes in oils, often depicting farming activities such as harvesting and haymaking, as well as river and coastal scenes and traditional rural architecture. Much of his painting was done in the counties of southern England.

He studied art at St. Martins School of Art and later at one of the Royal Academy schools. Despite his popularity and success, Parker never exhibited in major national exhibitions during his lifetime, although he did show his work in Canada and the United States. Relatively little is known about his personal life. His works not only reflect the influence of the impressionist school but also demonstrate similarities in technique and subject matter to those of his contemporary, the renowned artist Benjamin Williams Leader. Additionally, Parker served as an illustrator for the Illustrated London News.

Parker also worked under the pseudonyms H.D. Hillier and H. D. Hillyer.
