= Henry Meredith Parker =

British writer (1795–1863)

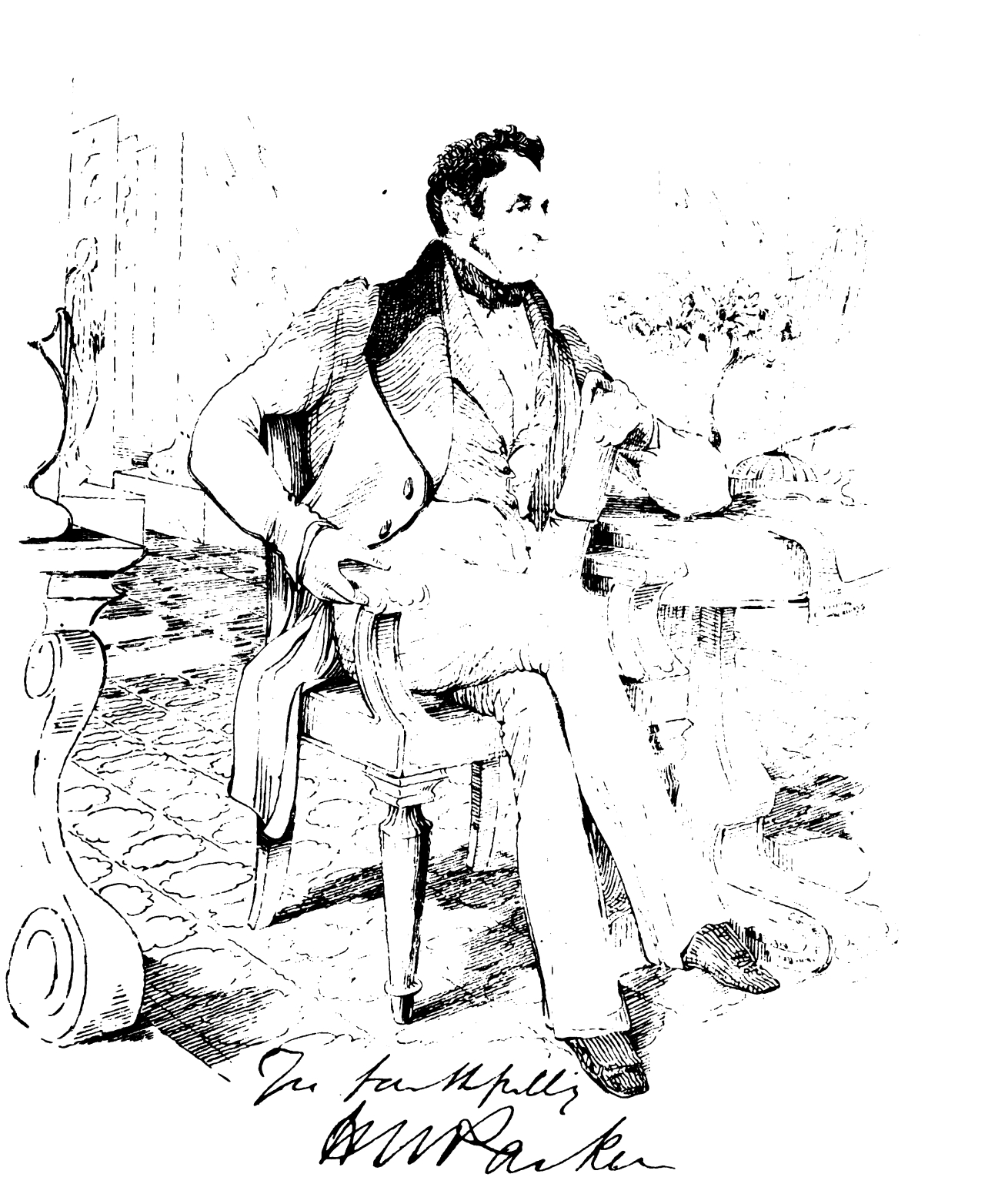
Portrait sketch by Colesworthey Grant

Henry Meredith Parker (1795–1863) was a British writer who lived in Calcutta, India, worked in the Bengal Civil Service, and wrote poems and essays. He contributed a lot to local Indian periodicals such as the Calcutta Review. A major work was his two-volume Bole Ponjis ("Punch Bowl"). Along with Theodore Dickens, Ashutosh Dey, and others, he established the Union Bank of Calcutta in 1829.

Parker's mother was a famous Covent Garden Theatre dancer. In his youth, he played violin at the playhouse. He started work for Lord Moira at the Tower of London, followed by a clerkship in the Commissariat. He served in the Peninsular War and became a writer for the Bengal Civil Service in 1813. He worked as an assistant to the Superintendent of the Western Salt Chaukis, as an assistant Salt Agent in Chittagong, and then in the Customs department. He retired in 1842 with an entertaining farewell performance that he gave at the Sans Souci Theatre in Park Street. In his spare time, he wrote farcical plays for the Calcutta theatre, many of which were drawn from French sources. He supported James Silk Buckingham and the publication of his Calcutta Journal. He was known for supporting cultural integration between Indians and Europeans. Henry Louis Vivian Derozio wrote a Sonnet to Henry Meredith Parker. Kasiprasad Ghosh wrote a poem to Parker.

In his Indian War Song, published in 1824, he foresaw the 1857 rebellion. This was written under the initials "C.J.," but he also wrote under other pseudonyms, including Bernard Wycliffe.
