= Elsternwick railway station =

Railway station in Melbourne, Australia

Elsternwick
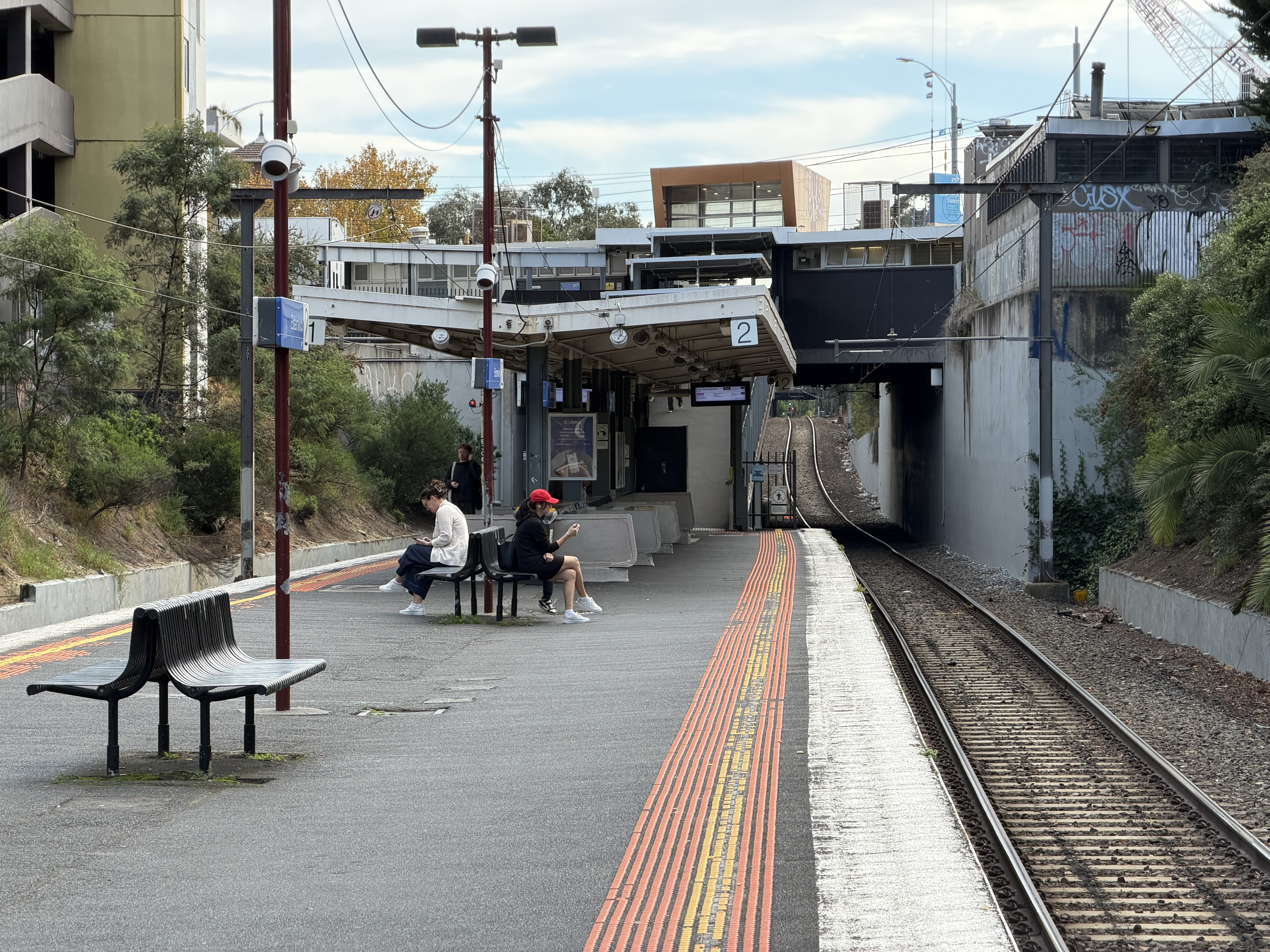
- Northbound view from Platform 2, May 2026

General information
- Location: Glen Huntly Road, Elsternwick, Victoria 3185; City of Glen Eira; Australia
- Coordinates: 37°53′05″S 145°00′03″E
- System: PTV commuter rail station
- Owner: VicTrack
- Operator: Metro Trains
- Line: Sandringham
- Distance: 10.95 kilometres from Southern Cross
- Platforms: 2 (1 island)
- Tracks: 2
- Connections: Bus; Tram; SkyBus

Construction
- Structure type: Below ground
- Parking: 84
- Cycle facilities: Yes
- Accessible: Yes—step free access

Other information
- Status: Operational, premium station
- Station code: ELS
- Fare zone: Myki zone 1
- Website: Public Transport Victoria

History
- Opened: 19 December 1859; 166 years ago
- Rebuilt: 2 October 1960
- Electrified: May 1919 (1500 V DC overhead)

Passengers
- 2005–2006: 841,257
- 2006–2007: 916,332 ▲8.92%
- 2007–2008: 989,299 ▲7.96%
- 2008–2009: 1,007,936 ▲1.88%
- 2009–2010: 1,046,897 ▲3.86%
- 2010–2011: 1,069,260 ▲2.13%
- 2011–2012: 1,003,833 ▼6.11%
- 2012–2013: Not measured
- 2013–2014: 1,074,614 ▲7.05%
- 2014–2015: 1,034,406 ▼3.74%
- 2015–2016: 1,038,555 ▲0.4%
- 2016–2017: 1,120,324 ▲7.87%
- 2017–2018: 1,104,811 ▼1.38%
- 2018–2019: 971,210 ▼12.09%
- 2019–2020: 797,150 ▼17.92%
- 2020–2021: 385,100 ▼51.69%
- 2021–2022: 438,400 ▲13.84%
- 2022–2023: 710,350 ▲62.03%
- 2023–2024: 797,050 ▲12.21%
- 2024–2025: 763,500 ▼4.2%

Services
Preceding station	Metro Trains	Following station
Ripponlea towards Laverton, Werribee or Williamstown via Flinders Street	Sandringham line	Gardenvale towards Sandringham
Former services
Preceding station	Disused railways	Following station
Junction	Rosstown Railway	Garden Vale towards Oakleigh
Track layout
Location

Elsternwick station is a railway station operated by Metro Trains Melbourne on the Sandringham line, part of the Melbourne rail network. It serves the south-eastern suburb of Elsternwick, in Melbourne, Victoria, Australia. Elsternwick station is a ground level premium station, featuring an island platform. It opened on 19 December 1859, with the current station provided in 1960.

== History ==
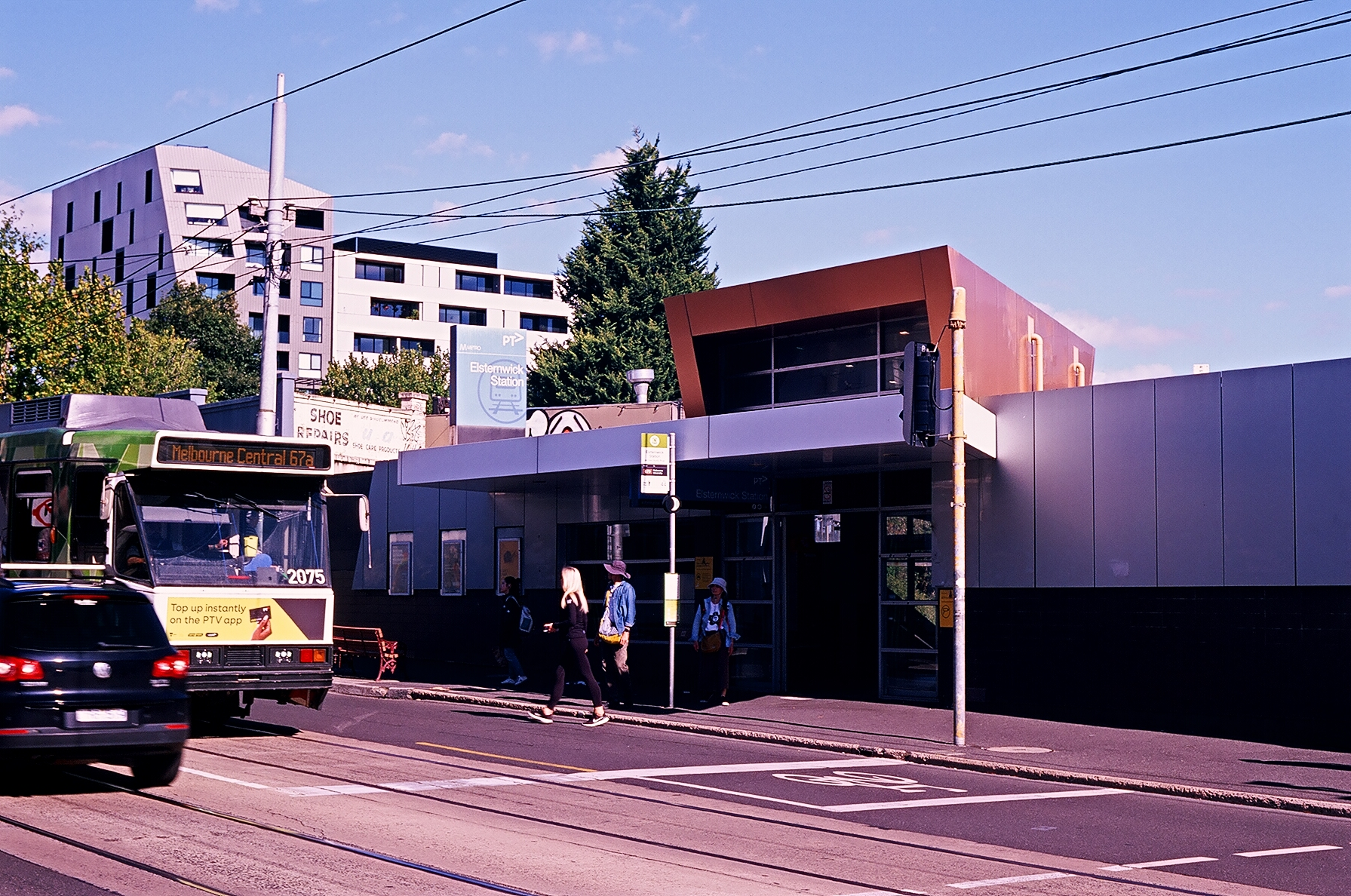
The station's building and main entrance, February 2024

Elsternwick station was originally part of the Melbourne & Hobson's Bay United Railway Company's network. The company and network was taken over by the Government of Victoria in 1878, to become part of Victorian Railways. As with the nearby suburb of Ripponlea, which had been named after the adjacent Rippon Lea Estate of Frederick Sargood, Elsternwick had been named after the largest property in the district, Charles Ebden's Elster.

In the 1880s, Elsternwick also functioned as the western end of the cross-suburban Rosstown Railway, which was built by entrepreneur William Murray Ross, mainly to serve the sugar beet processing mill that he had established, along with an adjoining residential estate in the locality he called Rosstown, now known as Carnegie. The railway was seldom used and it was officially closed in 1916.

In 1915, an electric tramline between Elsternwick and Point Ormond opened. It closed on 22 October 1960, after which the tram route became part of an extended 246 bus route. In February 1959, a project commenced to eliminate the Glen Huntly Road level crossing, where a tramway also crossed the rail line. A temporary two-track station was provided in a side street parallel with the station, which allowed rail services to continue uninterrupted. In October 1960, the work was completed, which was when the present railway buildings were provided.

In 1992, the station was the first in Melbourne to receive the former Public Transport Corporation's teal, sunflower and white coloured station signage, which has since been replaced with Public Transport Victoria branded blue signage. On 13 November 1995, Elsternwick was upgraded to a premium station.

During 2002–2003, the ground-level station car-park was closed, with a residential/retail development built on it, as part of a deal under which a developer was given the land with the condition that a multi-storey car park, including a lift, was provided for passengers. In 2004, the station underwent a refurbishment.

== Platforms and services ==
Elsternwick has one island platform with two faces. It is serviced by Metro Trains' Sandringham line services.

Elsternwick platform arrangement
Platform	Line	Destination	Via	Service Type	Notes	Source
1	Sandringham line	Laverton, Werribee or Williamstown	Flinders Street	All stations	Services to Laverton and Williamstown only operate on weekdays.	
2	Sandringham line	Sandringham		All stations		

== Transport links ==
CDC Melbourne operates two bus routes via Elsternwick station, under contract to Public Transport Victoria:

- 606 : to Fishermans Bend
- 625 : Elsternwick – Chadstone Shopping Centre

Kinetic Melbourne operates three routes via Elsternwick station, under contract to Public Transport Victoria:

- 246 : to Clifton Hill
- 603 : Brighton Beach station – Burnley station
- 604 : to Anzac station

Yarra Trams operates one route via Elsternwick Station

- : Melbourne University – Carnegie

SkyBus also operates a service to Melbourne Airport via Elsternwick station.
