= Carnegie, Victoria =

Carnegie
- Suburb
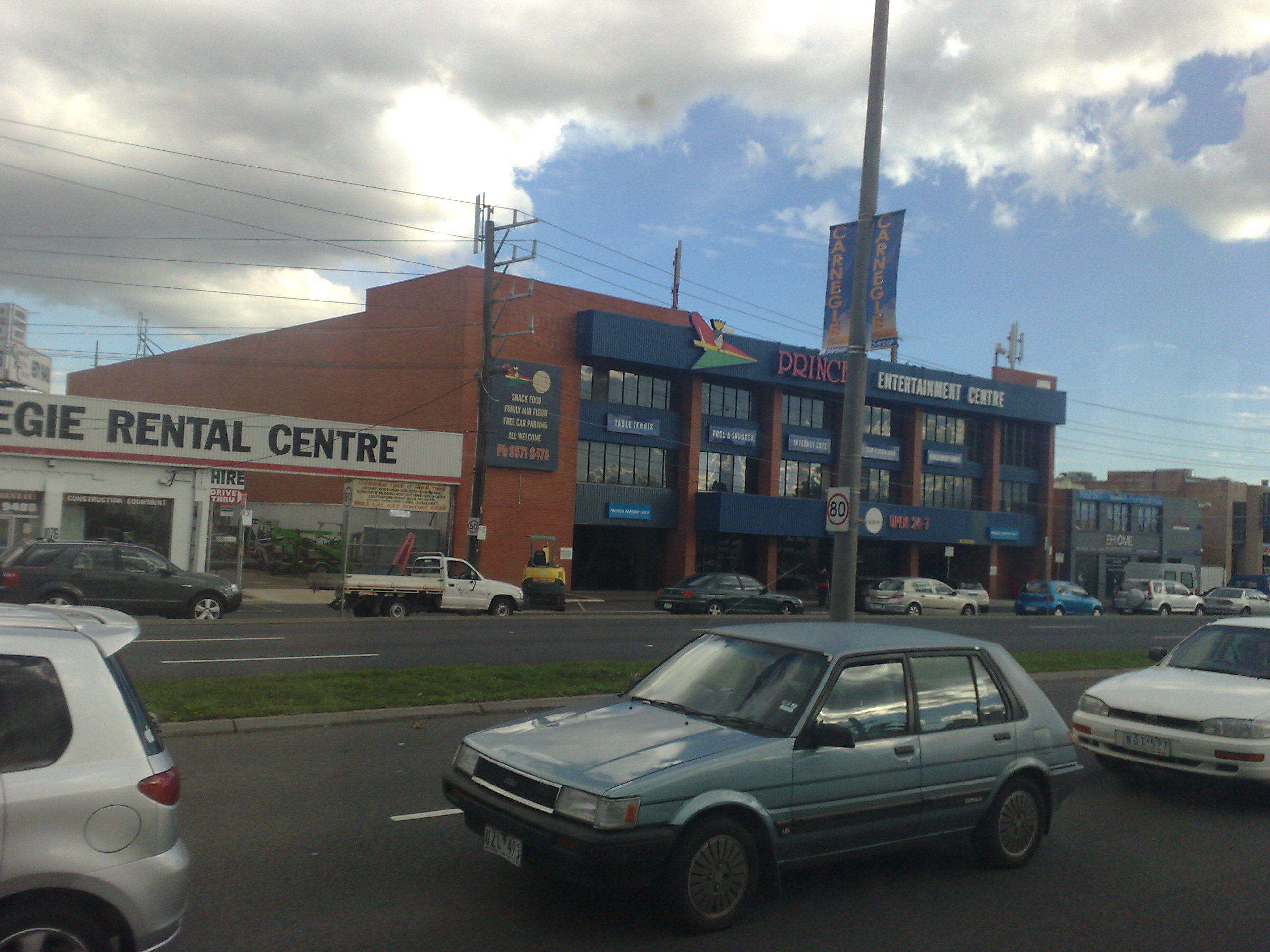
- The former Princes Entertainment Centre (now a storage facility) in Carnegie on Princes Highway

- Interactive map of Carnegie
- Coordinates: 37.888°S 145.062°E
- Country: Australia
- State: Victoria
- City: Melbourne
- LGA: City of Glen Eira
- Location: 12 km (7.5 mi) from Melbourne

Government
  - State electorate: Oakleigh
  - Federal division: Hotham

Area
  - Total: 3.8 km^{2} (1.5 sq mi)

Population
  - Total: 17,909 (2021 census)
  - Density: 4,710/km^{2} (12,210/sq mi)
- Postcode: 3163
Suburbs around Carnegie
Caulfield East	Malvern East
Glen Huntly	Carnegie	Murrumbeena
Ormond		Bentleigh East

Carnegie is a suburb in Melbourne, Victoria, Australia, 12 km south-east of Melbourne's central business district, on the railway line between Caulfield and Oakleigh, located within the City of Glen Eira local government area. Carnegie recorded a population of 17,909 at the 2021 census.

The suburb's main shopping precinct is a well-regarded 'eat street,’ with cafes and restaurants lining Koornang Road from Dandenong Road to Neerim Road. Koornang Park and the neighbouring Carnegie Swim Centre are located between Koornang Road, Munro Avenue and Lyons Street.

Originally called Rosstown, after William Murray Ross, a prominent property developer and entrepreneur, a name change came about due to Ross' failed speculative developments. In 1909 it was renamed Carnegie. It has been suggested that this was done in an unsuccessful attempt to secure funds for a library from the philanthropist Andrew Carnegie but there is no contemporary evidence supporting this.

Its postcode is 3163.

== History ==
=== Toponymy ===
The area was originally called Rosstown, after the developer William Murray Ross, who owned a large amount of land in the area. The original name lives on in the name of the local hotel, and in Rosstown Road. Leila Road is named after Ross's wife, and Grange Road is named after Ross's estate, The Grange, which has since been subdivided into suburban housing estates.

Artist's impression of the Rosstown sugar beet mill and railway, in 1876 and before construction had begun

=== Establishment ===
In 1875 Ross began circulating a broadsheet proposal which detailed the Rosstown project, a large scale sugar beet processing mill, a railway line to serve it, and a residential estate, named after him on the edge of the metropolis between Melbourne and the town of Oakleigh. Although he began building the mill, it never began production, and the Rosstown Railway he constructed was never used.

However the estate sold well and gradually Rosstown had grown to a reasonable size aided by the opening of the railway to Melbourne in 1879.

Carnegie Post Office opened on 1 September 1911. Carnegie was originally part of the City of Caulfield and by the 1920s it had a substantial commercial area.

The Carnegie Theatre was a popular cinema in the 1930s.

Carnegie Library and Community Centre sits between Koornang Road and Shepparson St, with a nearby Community space developed in 2021.

== Transport ==
The northern part of Carnegie and the Koornang Road shopping strip is served by Carnegie station on the Cranbourne and East Pakenham trainlines. Carnegie is served by CDC Melbourne bus routes 623, 624, 625, 626, 900 and NightBus 980. Tram route 67 terminates just south of the shopping centre and serves the southern part of Carnegie. The Public Transport Users Association has instigated calls for its extension to the nearby Carnegie station which services the shopping centre, as a major mode interchange .

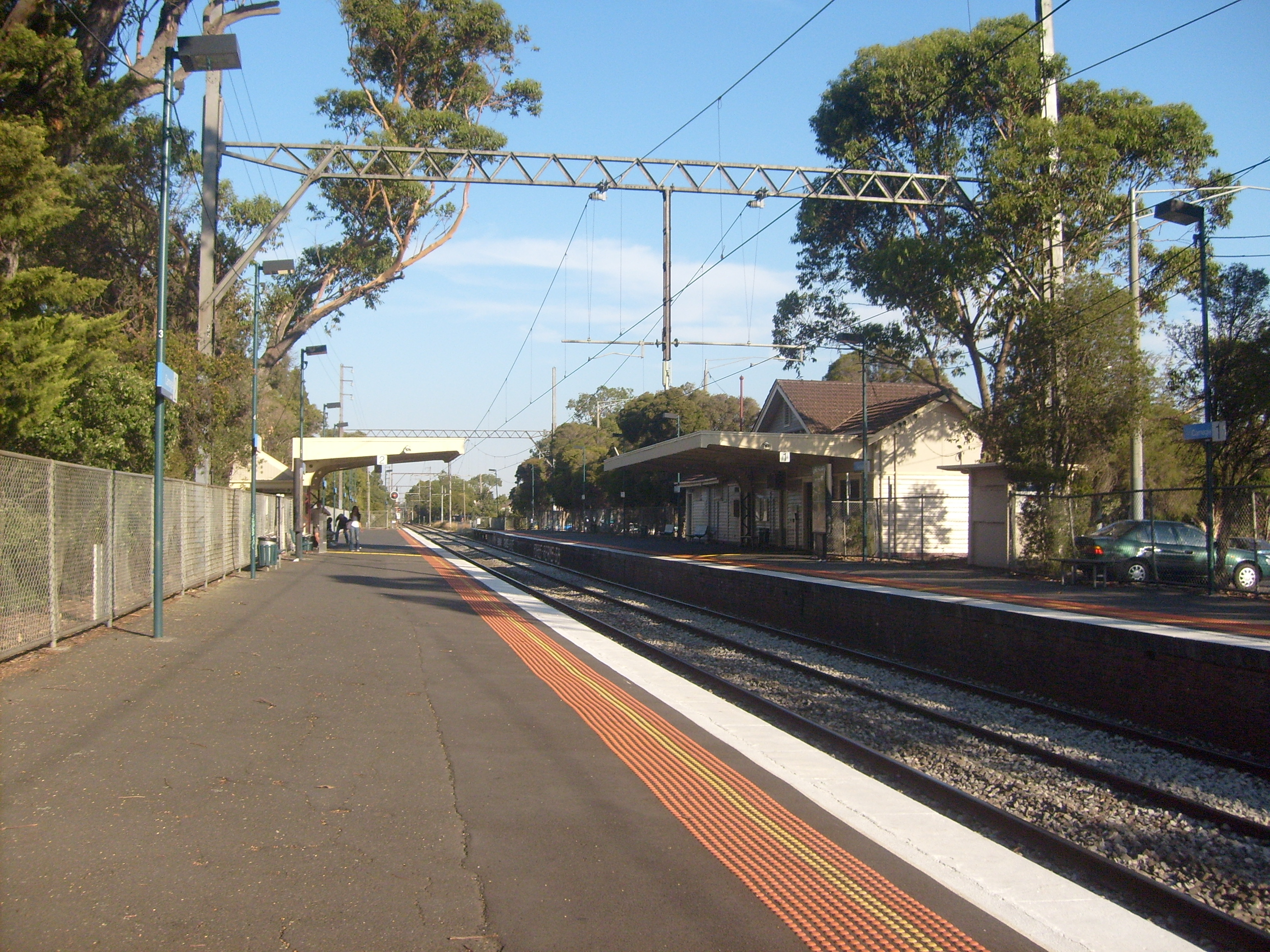
Former Carnegie railway station in February 2009

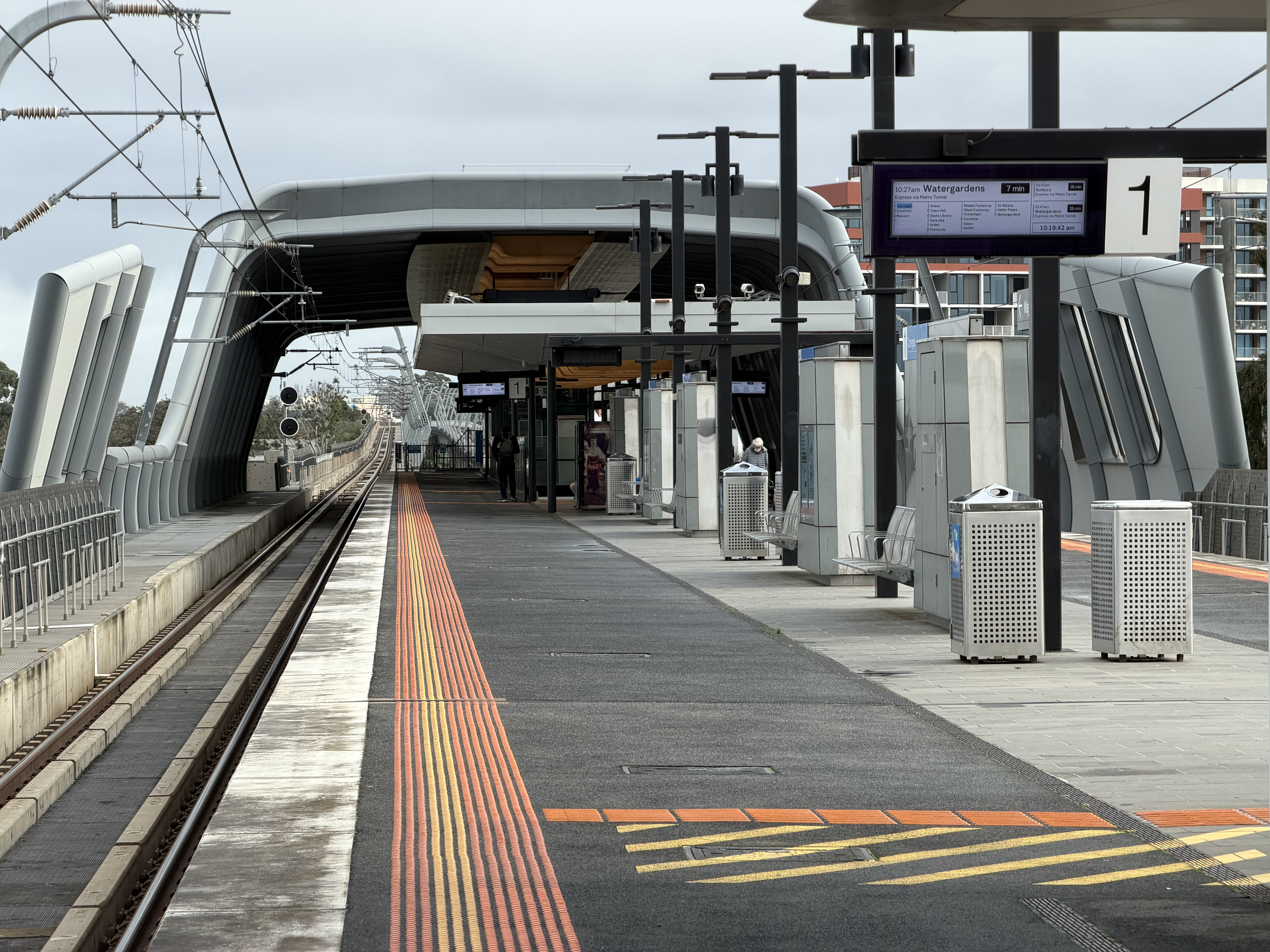
Rebuilt Carnegie railway station in June 2026

=== Buses ===
- SmartBus service
- NightBus services

=== Trains ===
There are two train services that pass through Carnegie railway station. As part of the government's Level Crossing Removal Project, Carnegie station closed in January 2017 and was demolished with a replacement opening in November 2017.

Destination	Destination	Via
Flinders Street	Pakenham	Direct or the City Loop, Dandenong
Flinders Street	Cranbourne	Direct or the City Loop, Dandenong

== Demographics ==
Carnegie has a diverse cultural cross-section, with many permanent settlers from across the globe, and transient international students studying at the nearby Monash University (Caulfield campus).

== Commercial centres ==
=== Koornang Road ===
On Koornang Road alone there are restaurants and grocers offering Malaysian, Korean, Chinese, Thai, Japanese, Indian, Italian, Greek, Polish, French, Vietnamese, Uighur and Russian foods, as well as the Rosstown Hotel.

=== Princes Highway ===
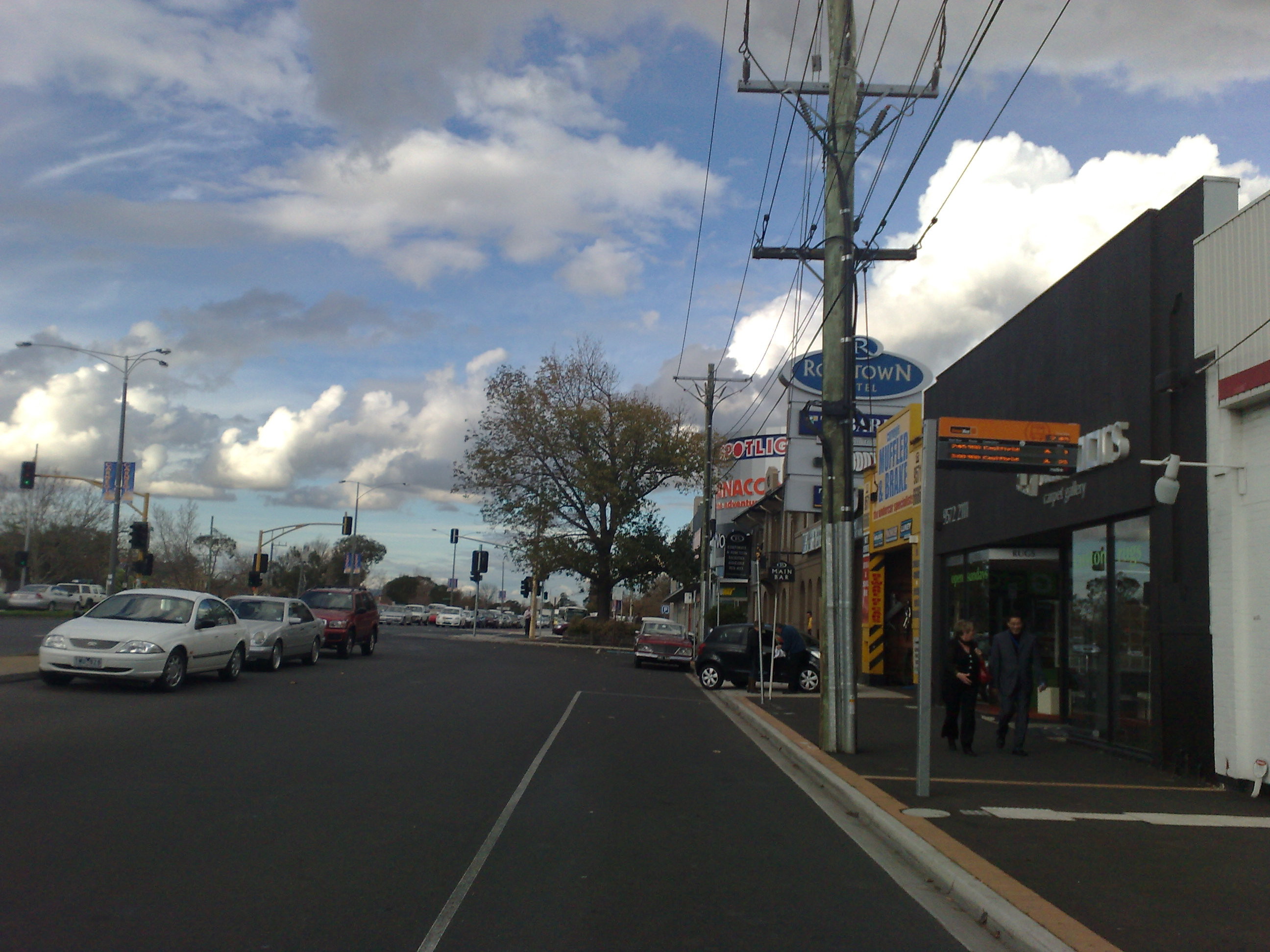
The southern view from Princes Entertainment Centre in Carnegie. The Rosstown Hotel front sign can be seen in the background

Dandenong Road is increasingly becoming a focus of Carnegie's development. Originally the Rosstown Hotel was the focus of this part of the commercial strip, however today there are numerous showrooms and homemaker stores.

== Schools ==
The main primary school is Carnegie Primary School (No. 2897), established in 1888 as Rosstown State School.

== Parks and recreation ==
Surrounded by native bushland, Packer Park has a broad range of sport and recreation facilities including a velodrome (cycling), cricket/football ovals, cricket nets, outdoor basketball courts, tennis and golf practice areas, lawn bowls/bocce greens, extensive adventure playground, BBQs, wetland walking trail and off-leash dog-walking areas.

The Velodrome, located at Packer Park, is one of the few of its kind in Victoria and is home to Carnegie Caulfield Cycling Club. Athletes used the velodrome as a cycling training venue during the 1956 Melbourne Olympic Games, while Australian athletes trained there for the 1960 and 1964 Olympic Games.

The 17 km-long Djerring Trail, which runs under the elevated rail pylons, was completed in 2018. The leafy, shared pedestrian/bike path has exercise stations, and links Carnegie to Murrumbeena (east) and Caulfield (west). Table tennis tables (bring your own bats and balls) and exercise equipment are adjacent to the trail opposite the train station on the west side of Koornang Road.

The Carnegie War Memorial features a rose garden and cypress trees on Koornang Road, midway between Neerim Road and North Road. This is also the playground side of Koornang Park, which also provides grassed areas, walking trails, golf cages and cricket nets, and is home to Caulfield Football Club and Caulfield Junior Football Club. After redevelopment completed in 2025, Carnegie Memorial Swimming Pool is a beloved complex with grassed areas, indoor and outdoor swimming pools, public barbeques and a sauna/spa room.

Lord Reserve continues on from Koornang Park and the pool, providing three sports ovals (cricket and soccer), cricket nets, a picnic shelter and BBQs, off-leash dog area and a perimeter walking path. It is home to Carnegie Cricket Club, Carnegie South Cricket Club, Monash Gryphons Cricket Club, Glen Eira Football (soccer) Club, Caulfield Cougars Soccer Club and Glen Eira Junior Soccer Club.

== Notable people ==
- Australian artist Lisa Roet is world renowned for her giant chimpanzee and golden monkey sculptures which scale buildings, and simian inspired jewellery.
- Former Hawthorn Australian Football League player, Len Andrews (Australian footballer) (1922–2010), originally played for Carnegie.
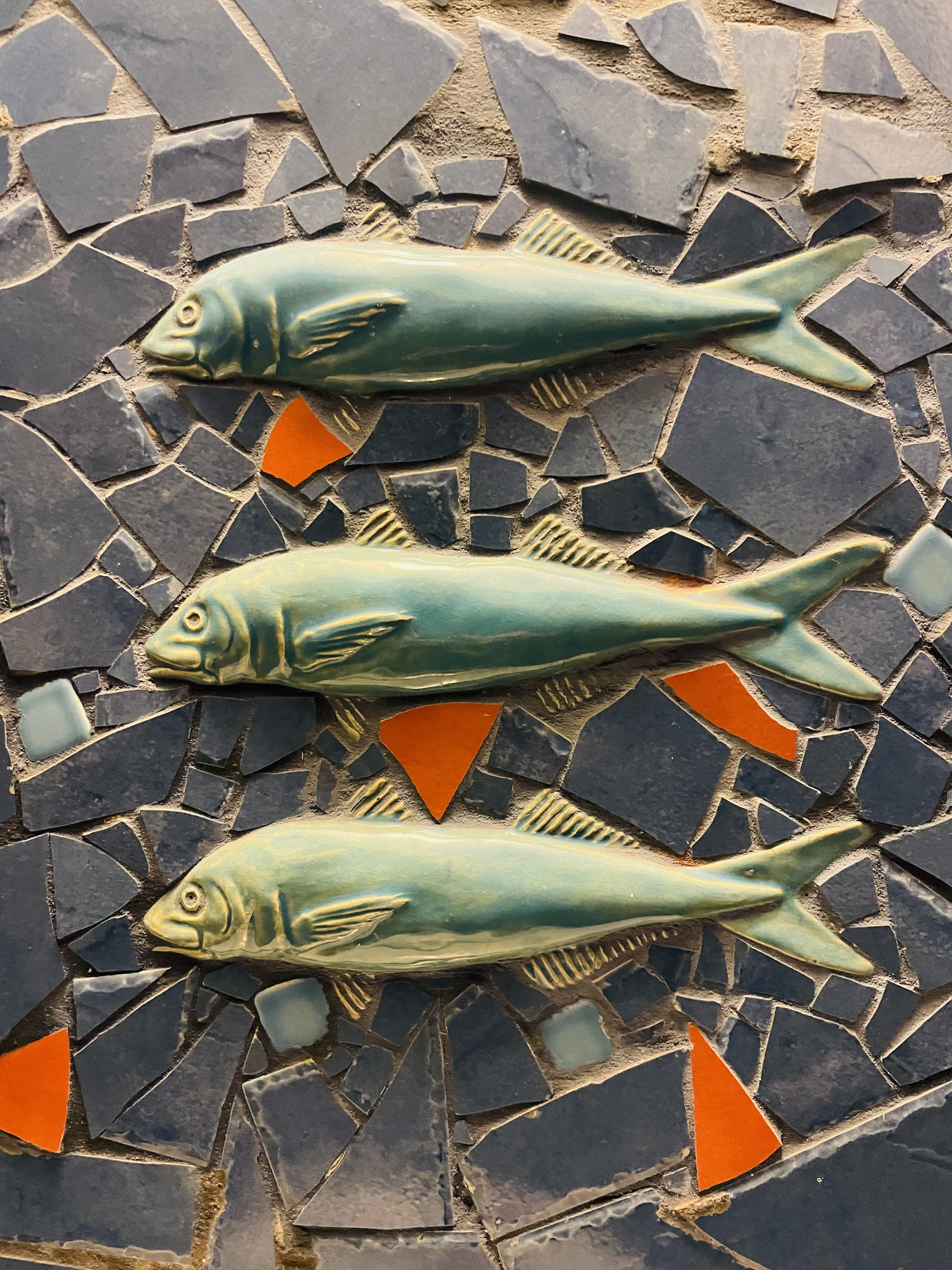
Fish mosaics, Carnegie

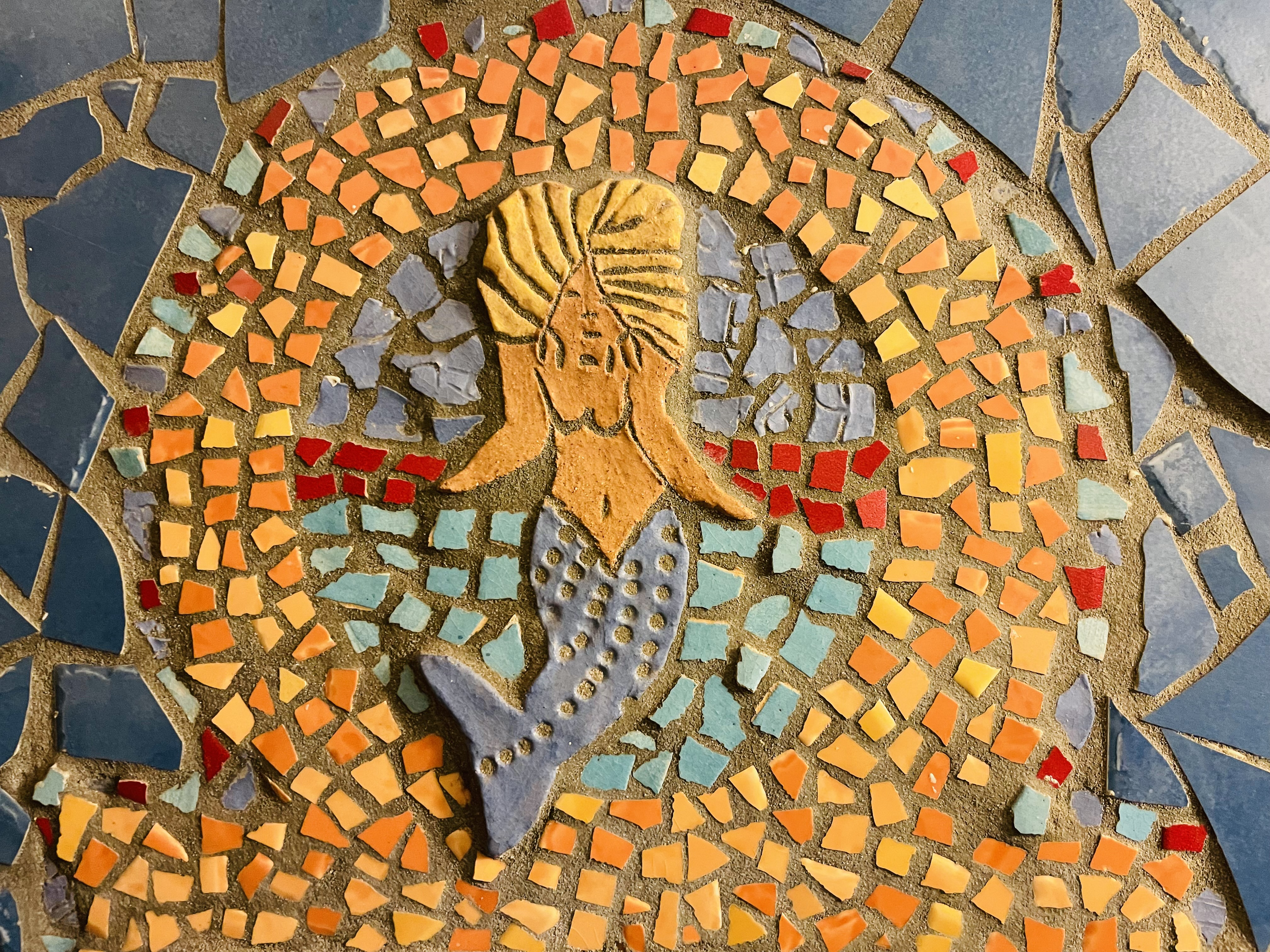
Mermaid mosaic, Carnegie

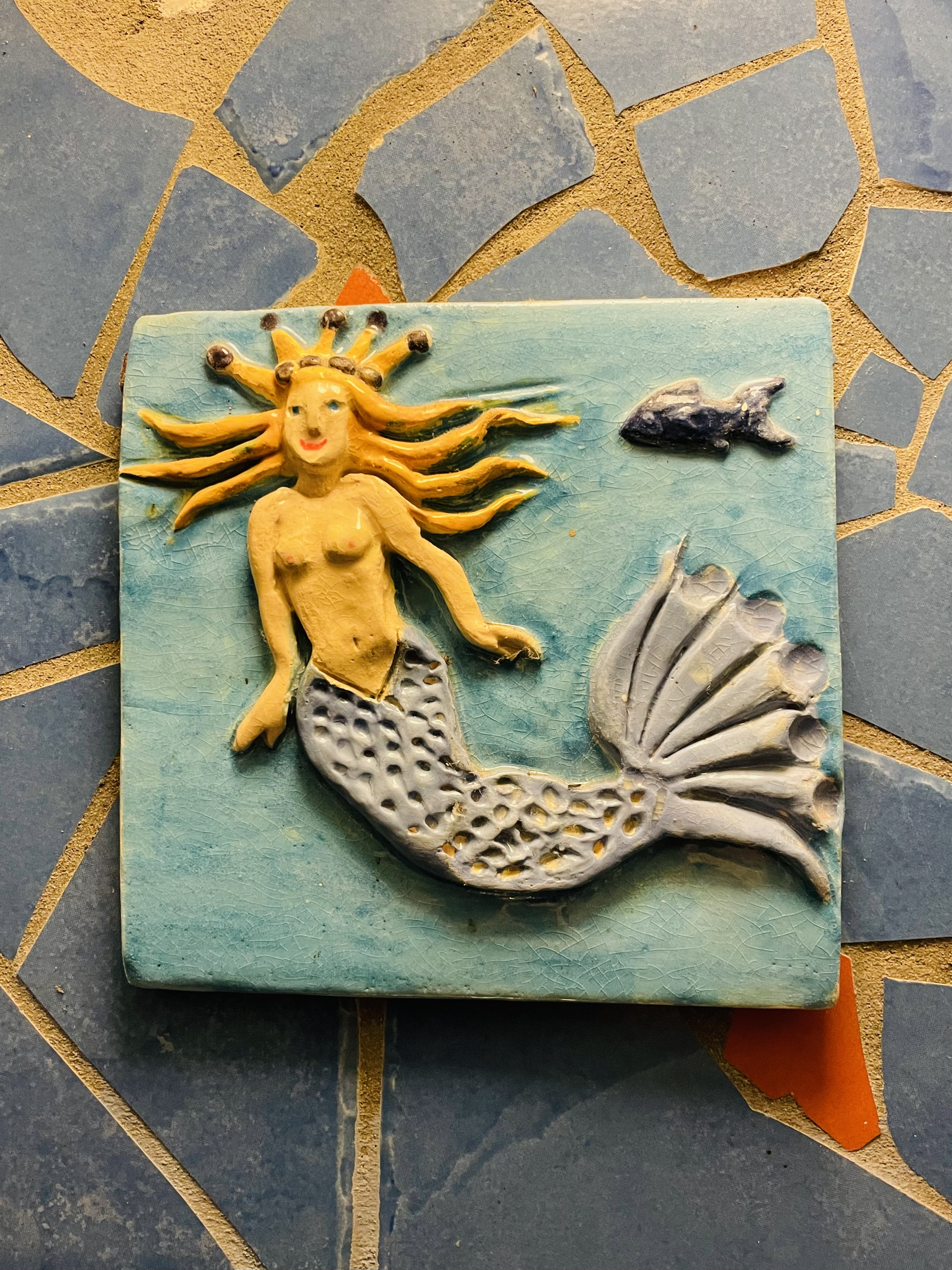
Mermaid mosaic, Carnegie

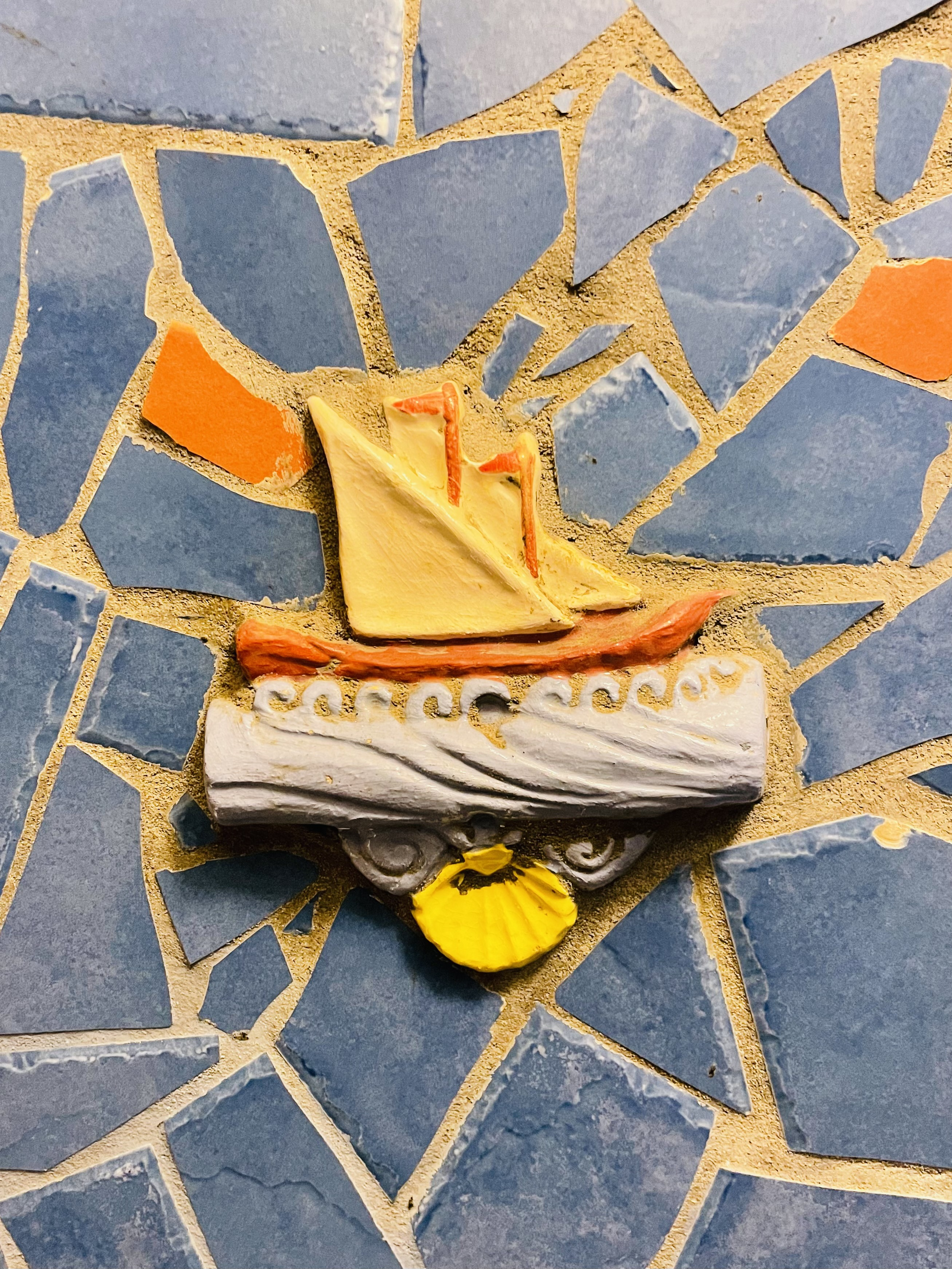
Boat mosaic, Carnegie

== See also ==
- City of Caulfield – Carnegie was previously within this former local government area.
