= Djerring Trail =

Shared-use path in the southeast of Melbourne, Victoria, Australia

- Length: 17km
- Location: Melbourne, Victoria, Australia
- Difficulty: Easy to medium
- Surface: Concrete
- Trains: Cranbourne line and Pakenham line: Caulfield station; Carnegie station; Murrumbeena station; Hughesdale station; Oakleigh station; Huntingdale station; Clayton station; Westall station; Springvale station; Sandown Park station; Noble Park station; Yarraman station; Dandenong station
- Parking: Adjacent railway stations

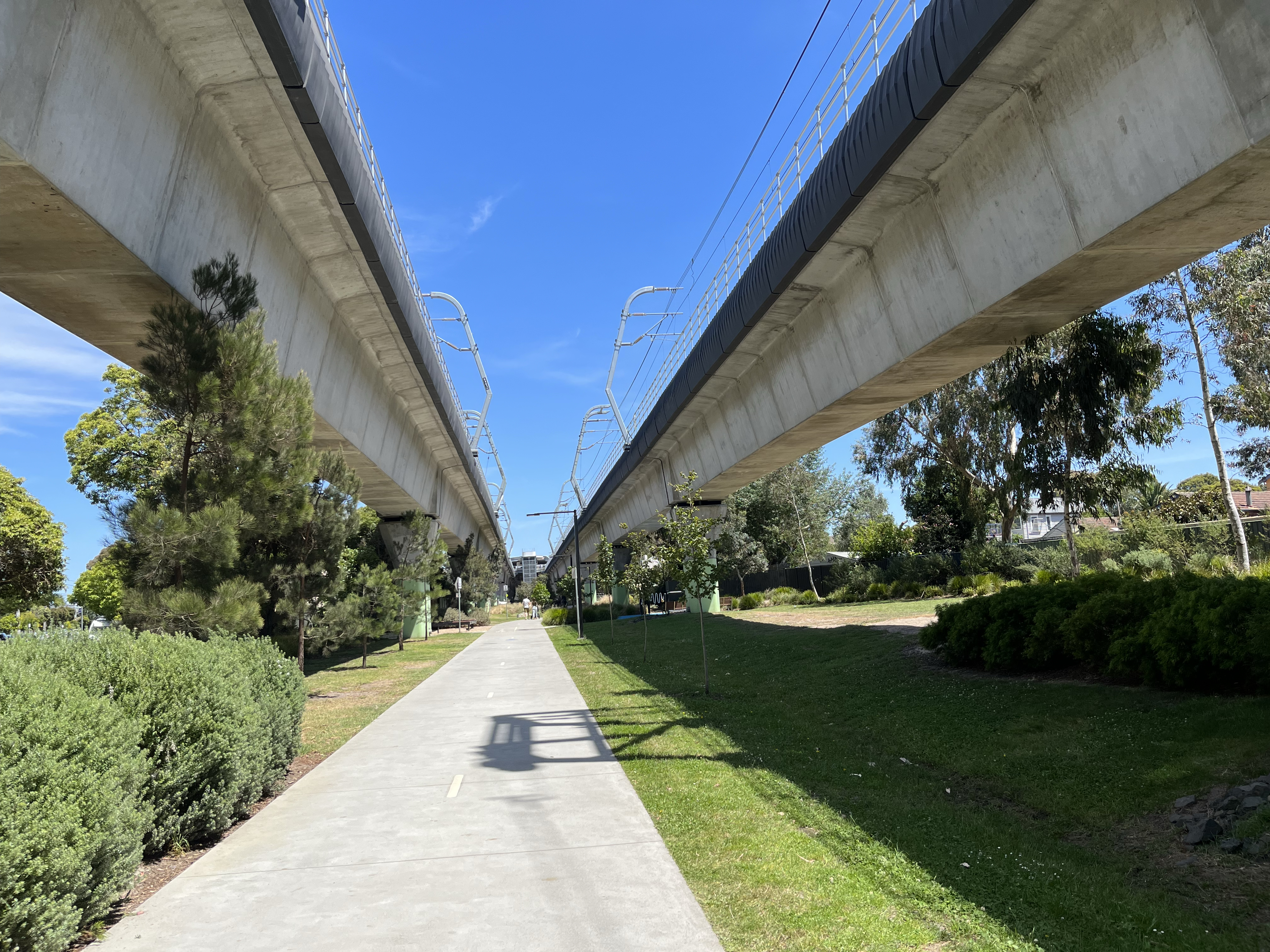
Djerring Trail, looking towards Carnegie Station, 2023

The Djerring Trail is a shared use path that runs alongside the Cranbourne and Pakenham railway lines in southeastern Melbourne, Australia. The route serves a total of 13 railway stations.

== History ==
The Djerring Trail was built as a part of the Level Crossing Removal Project, that eliminated all level crossings between Caulfield and Dandenong by raising the railway line. To form the Djerring Trail, 12 kilometres of the new shared path was built, along with merging existing paths into the new ones.

In early 2018, a community vote was held to determine the name of the new path, some of the alternative options being Kerrboo onool Trail, Urban Parkland Trail, and Eucalyptus Trail. Over 1800 votes were counted. On 26 September 2018, it was revealed that the name "Djerring trail" was the most popular, receiving 30% of the total vote. "Djerring Rail Trail" came second, showing that the name "Djerring" was clearly preferred.

While consultation about the naming of the trail was taking place, construction began in early 2018, in conjunction with the removal of nine level crossings along the Pakenham and Cranbourne lines.

== Trail Route ==
=== Caulfield to Carnegie ===
The trail begins at the end of Dudley Street, just below East Caulfield Reserve. It runs adjacent to the rail line past a connection with Gibson street and Lorne Street, and a small fitness area underneath the rail line. It then intersects with Grange Road, where there is a set of cycling-prioritised traffic lights. It then continues past some open space, with seating, near Girdwood Avenue and Princes Highway. It runs in a straight line, with a connection to Egan Street, until it intersects with Koornang Road, with another set of cycling-friendly traffic lights. It then reaches the entrance of Carnegie station.

=== Carnegie to Murrumbeena ===
The trail runs parallel to Carnegie station and Woorayl Street. It crosses the entrance to the station car park and runs directly underneath the rail line, with connections onto Jersey Parade, Hewitts Road, Oakdene Crescent and Beena Avenue. It then intersects with Murrumbeena Road and reaches Murrumbeena station.

=== Murrumbeena to Hughesdale ===
The trail runs underneath Murrumbeena station, and parallels Railway Parade, which also has bike lanes on it. It connects with Nerrim Road and then the entrance to the Murrumbeena station car park. It runs parallel to Railway Parade and the rail line, connecting with Arthur Street and Ella Street. It then intersects with the Outer Circle Trail, crosses the entrance to the Hughesdale station car park, and reaches Hughesdale station.

=== Hughesdale to Oakleigh ===
This section begins by crossing Poath Road just next to the Hughesdale station bus interchange. It briefly curves and then runs parallel alongside the rail line, with a connection onto Willesden Road. It then curves south, runs past Galbally Reserve, and connects with the Rosstown Railway Heritage Trail. It continues eastwards, with connections onto Richardson Street and Paddington Road, before running underneath Warrigal Road and reaching Oakleigh station.

=== Oakleigh to Huntingdale ===
The Oakleigh -Huntingdale section of the trail begins by using the underpass underneath Oakleigh station to head to the northern end of the station. It runs along the footpath near the vehicle entrance to Oakleigh Central Shopping Centre, turns off into a small car park, then goes off-road, back alongside the rail line. It runs underneath Hanover Road, and continues towards Huntingdale station, with connections on Oxford Street, Downing Street, Westminster Street, and runs past industrial area.

=== Huntingdale to Clayton ===
The trail runs through the car park and bus interchange before again becoming off-road. It runs underneath Haughton Road, parallel with the rail line, including a connection to Carnish Road. It crosses over the rail line and runs along its south side. Curving underneath the rail line, it runs past a fitness area and intersects with Clayton Road. It then reaches Clayton station

=== Clayton to Westall ===
The trail curves underneath Clayton station, and runs alongside the raised rail line, crossing over a bus lane and the Clayton station car park entrance. It runs past the Clayton RSL Memorial space, with a connection to Carnish Road, and later Haughton Road. It then bends until it runs north of the rail line, past two basketball courts and public seating located underneath the rail line, before intersecting with Centre Road. After crossing Centre Road, it runs past the Clayton Urban Park, and parallels Haughton Road and the rail line, with a connection to Rayhur Street. It curves sharply near Oakes Avenue and runs alongside Oakes Avenue until it reaches Westall station.

=== Westall to Springvale ===
The Westall - Springvale section of the trail leaves Westall station and crosses underneath Westall Road. It runs along the rail line, connecting with Newcombe Road and Springvale Reserve, as well as Queens Avenue and St Johns Avenue. It then intersects with Springvale Road and reaches Springvale station.

=== Springvale to Sandown Park ===
The trail weaves through the bus interchange and the entrance to the Springvale station car park, curving tightly so it runs adjacent to Lightwood Road. It connects with the Sandown Park Greyhound Racing Track and reaches Sandown Park station.

=== Sandown Park to Noble Park ===
The trail continues past Sandown Park station, connecting to Sandown Raceway. It continues parallel to Lightwood Road and the rail line, intersecting with Corrigan Road. After crossing over the road, there is a connection with the Noble Park dog park and Ross Reserve. It runs alongside an exercise area and a connection into the Ross Reserve car park. It then runs to Heatherton Road, where there are is playground and a skate park. After crossing Heatherton Road, it runs past the Noble Park station car park to and reaches Noble Park station.

=== Noble Park to Yarraman ===
After leaving Noble Park station, the route crosses Leonard Avenue and turns sharply to the north side of the rail. It passes the car park and crosses back to the southern side of the rail line, running parallel to Douglas Street and the line. It connects with Mons Parade and Mile Creek, intersects with Chandler Road, and runs alongside Hanna Road until it reaches Yarraman station. That is the last section of trail that is not shared with any other paths.

=== Yarraman to Dandenong ===
The trail merges with the EastLink Trail and runs south alongside EastLink. It crosses over Cheltenham Road, diverges off the EastLink Trail, and joins the Dandenong Creek Trail. That follows the Dandenong Creek Trail until Hammond Road, where the footpath is used to get to Dandenong station.

== Connections ==
The trail directly connects with the Dandenong Creek Trail, as well as the EastLink Trail. Nearby in the north is the Gardiners Creek Trail and the Anniversary Trail. The Djerring Trail connects with the Rosstown Rail Trail and, a little further south, at Huntingdale station, it connects to the Monash University - Clayton campus via the path on North Road. In 2022, Monash City Council announced a plan to construct a bicycle connection between the Djerring Trail and the Scotchmans Creek Trail, primarily following Aitkinson Street in Oakleigh.
