= Carnegie railway station =

Railway station in Melbourne, Australia

Carnegie
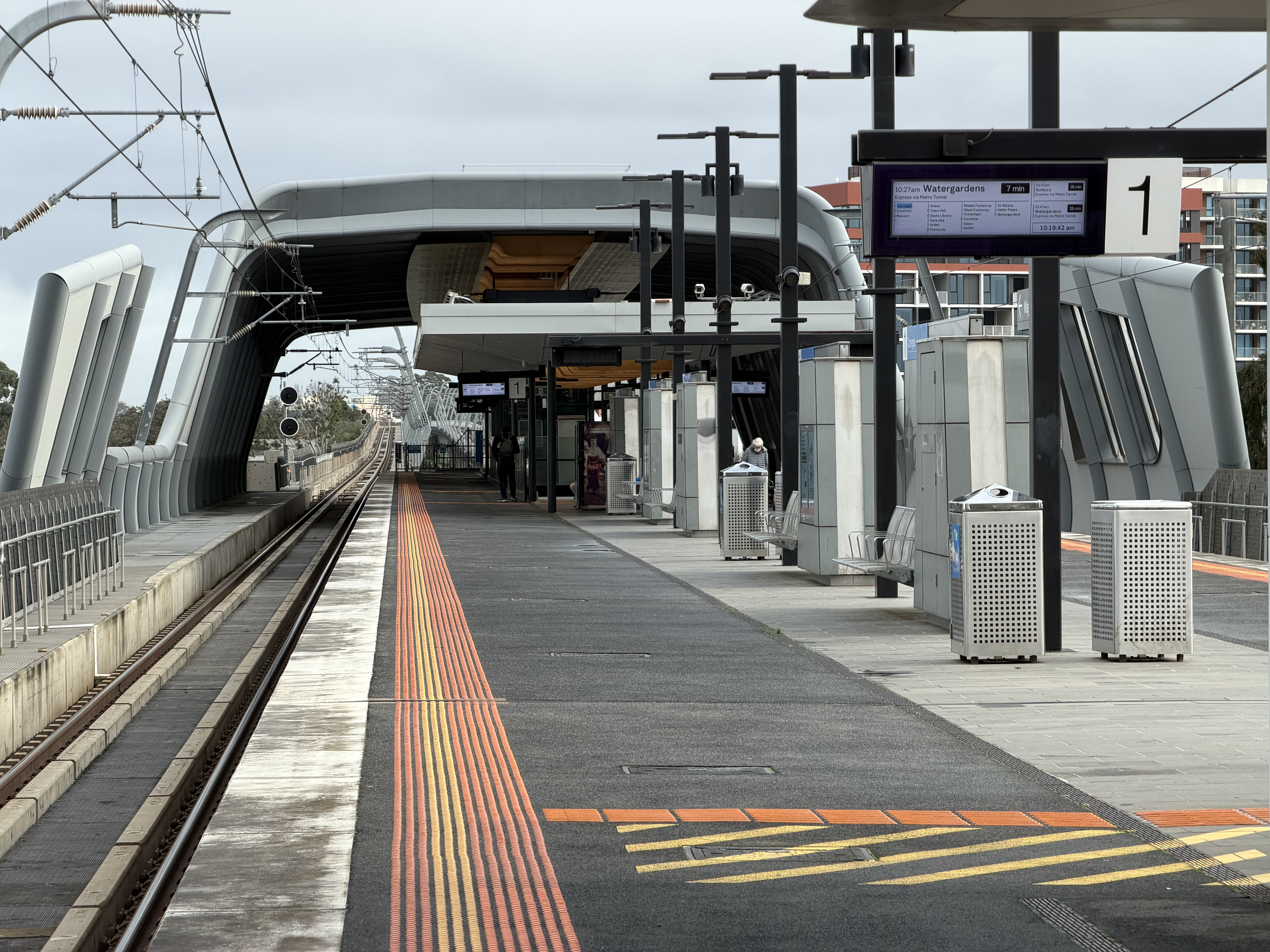
- North-west bound view from Platform 1, June 2026

General information
- Location: Morton Avenue, Carnegie, Victoria 3163; City of Glen Eira; Australia
- Coordinates: 37°53′11″S 145°03′31″E
- System: PTV commuter rail station
- Owner: VicTrack
- Operator: Metro Trains
- Lines: Cranbourne; Pakenham
- Distance: 13.53 kilometres from Southern Cross
- Platforms: 2 (1 island)
- Tracks: 2
- Connections: Bus

Construction
- Structure type: Elevated
- Parking: 120 spaces
- Cycle facilities: Yes
- Accessible: Yes—step free access

Other information
- Status: Operational, premium station
- Station code: CNE
- Fare zone: Myki zone 1
- Website: Public Transport Victoria

History
- Opened: 2 April 1879; 147 years ago
- Rebuilt: 18 June 2018 (LXRP)
- Electrified: March 1922 (1500 V DC overhead)
- Former names: Rosstown (1879–1909)

Passengers
- 2005–2006: 613,043
- 2006–2007: 667,653 ▲8.9%
- 2007–2008: 746,242 ▲11.77%
- 2008–2009: 831,026 ▲11.36%
- 2009–2010: 860,100 ▲3.49%
- 2010–2011: 894,113 ▲3.95%
- 2011–2012: 829,079 ▼7.27%
- 2012–2013: Not measured
- 2013–2014: 950,645 ▲14.66%
- 2014–2015: 1,010,382 ▲6.28%
- 2015–2016: 1,217,932 ▲20.54%
- 2016–2017: 910,282 ▼25.26%
- 2017–2018: 764,922 ▼15.96%
- 2018–2019: 991,272 ▲29.59%
- 2019–2020: 833,000 ▼15.96%
- 2020–2021: 460,850 ▼44.67%
- 2021–2022: 510,850 ▲10.85%

Services
Preceding station	Metro Trains	Following station
Caulfield towards Watergardens or Sunbury via Metro Tunnel	Cranbourne line	Murrumbeena towards Cranbourne or East Pakenham
Caulfield towards Watergardens or Sunbury via Metro Tunnel	Pakenham line	Murrumbeena towards Cranbourne or East Pakenham
Track layout
Location

Carnegie station is a railway station operated by Metro Trains Melbourne on the Cranbourne and Pakenham lines, both part of the Melbourne rail network. It serves the suburb of Carnegie, in the southeastern suburbs of Melbourne, Victoria, Australia. The station originally opened in 1879 as Rosstown. The station received its current name in 1909 alongside the renaming of the suburb. Carnegie is an elevated premium station, consisting of a single island platform connected to the station concourse on Koornang Road via escalators, lifts and a staircase.

The station is served by four bus routes, including SmartBus route 900. The station is approximately 17 kilometres (11.8 mi), or around a 33-minute train ride away, from Flinders Street.

== Description ==
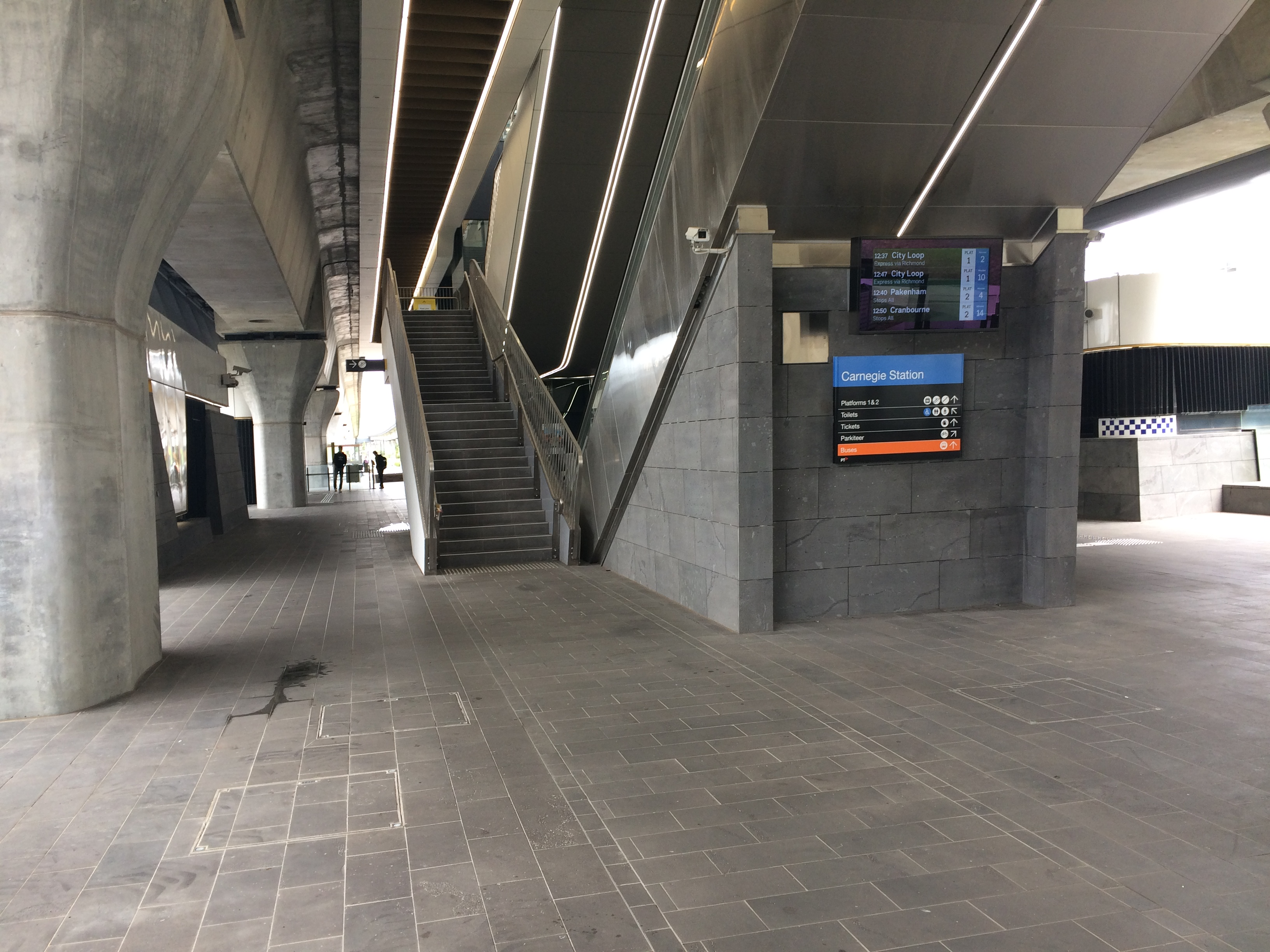
Station entrance and concourse, January 2021

Carnegie railway station is located in the suburb of Carnegie. On the south side of the station is Morton Road, and Koorang Road is to the west. The station is owned by VicTrack, a state government agency, and is operated by Metro Trains Melbourne. The station is approximately 12.5 kilometres (7.8 mi), or around a 21-minute train ride away, from Flinders Street.

Carnegie station consists of a single-island platform which is located above the road, and is connected to Koorang Road through stairs, a lift and escalators. The length of the platform is approximately 160 metres (520 ft), long enough for a Metro Trains' 7-car HCMT.

The main car park at the station is located on Morton Avenue, just south of the station. The station fully complies with the Disability Discrimination Act of 1992, as there is a lift that connects the station entrance with Platforms 1 and 2.

== History ==
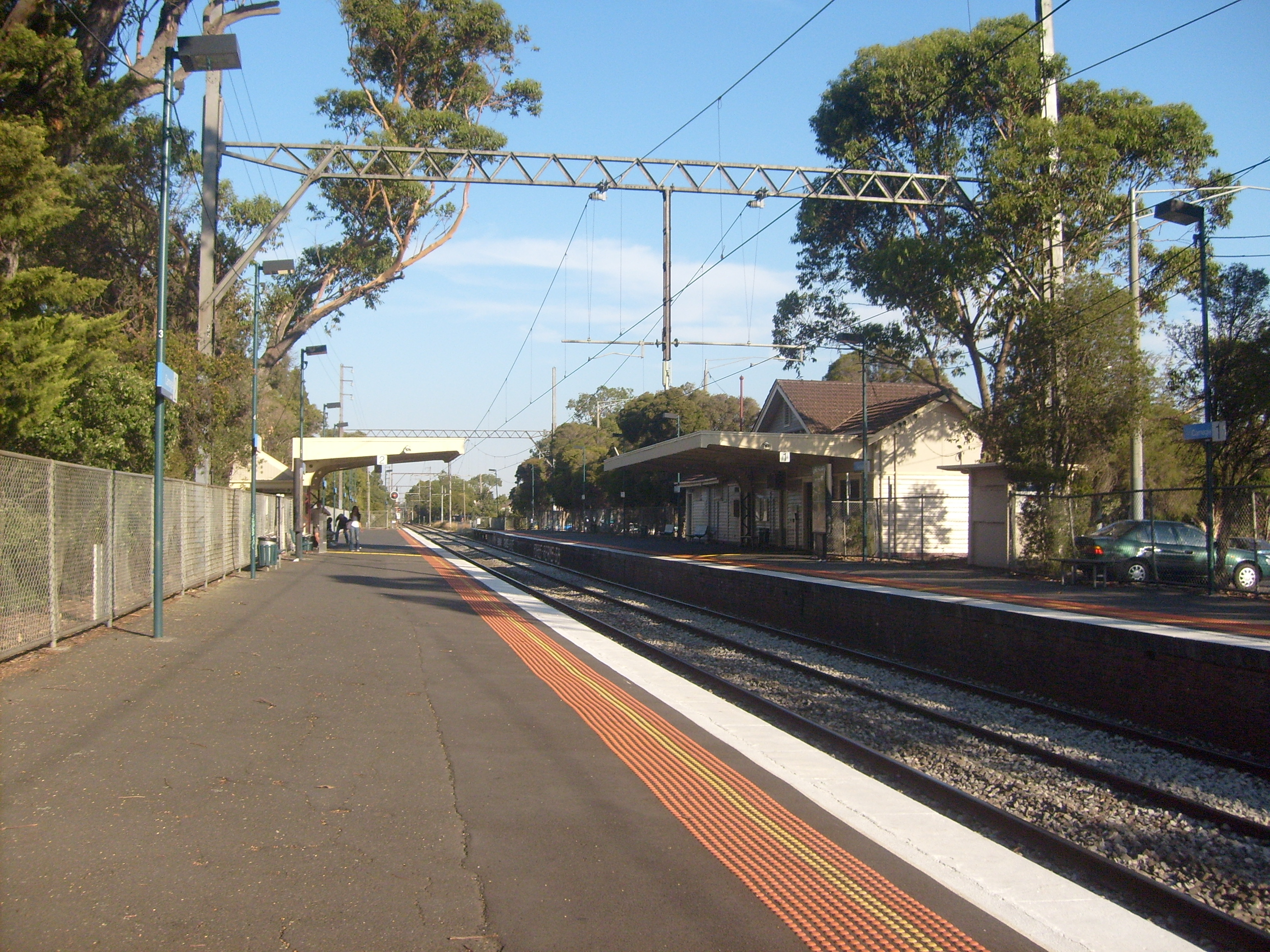
The former ground level station, February 2009

Carnegie station opened on 2 April 1879 just one month after the railway line from Caulfield was extended to Oakleigh, Carnegie station, like the suburb itself, gets it name from philanthropist Andrew Carnegie. Originally named Rosstown, after entrepreneur William Ross, the name change occurred in May 1909 after Ross' failed speculative developments made the name unpopular. Residents supported the name change to Carnegie, who were seeking to obtain funds from the philanthropist for a library, which was to be unsuccessful.

In 1967, boom barriers replaced interlocked gates at the former Koornang Road level crossing, which was located at the up end of the station.

In March 2014, the Level Crossing Removal Authority announced a grade separation project to replace the Koornang Road level crossing immediately to the west of the station. This included rebuilding the station above its previous location. On 18 June 2018, the rebuilt station opened.

== Platforms and services ==
Carnegie station is currently served by both Pakenham and Cranbourne services which are both operated by Metro Trains Melbourne. Services to East Pakenham and Cranbourne travel together southeast towards Dandenong before splitting into two separate lines. Services to the city run express from Caulfield (Malvern during off-peak) to South Yarra before stopping all stations to Flinders Street via the City Loop.

Carnegie platform arrangement
Platform	Line	Destination	Via	Service Type	Source
1	Cranbourne line Pakenham line	Sunbury, Watergardens or West Footscray	Town Hall	Limited express	
2	Cranbourne line Pakenham line	East Pakenham, Cranbourne or Westall		All stations	

== Transport links ==
Carnegie is served by four bus routes all departing from three separate bus stops. Routes 623 and 626 both depart from the stop at Koorang Road which is just outside the station, route 624 departs from Neerim Road which is located south of the station and Smartbus route 900 departs from Princes Highway (Dandenong Road) which is located north of the station.

=== Koorang Road ===
- 623 : Glen Waverley station – St Kilda
- 626 : Middle Brighton station – Chadstone Shopping Centre

=== Neerim Road ===
- 624 : Kew – Oakleigh station

=== Princes Highway ===
- SmartBus 900 : Stud Park Shopping Centre (Rowville) – Caulfield station
