= Caulfield East =

Caulfield East Melbourne, Victoria
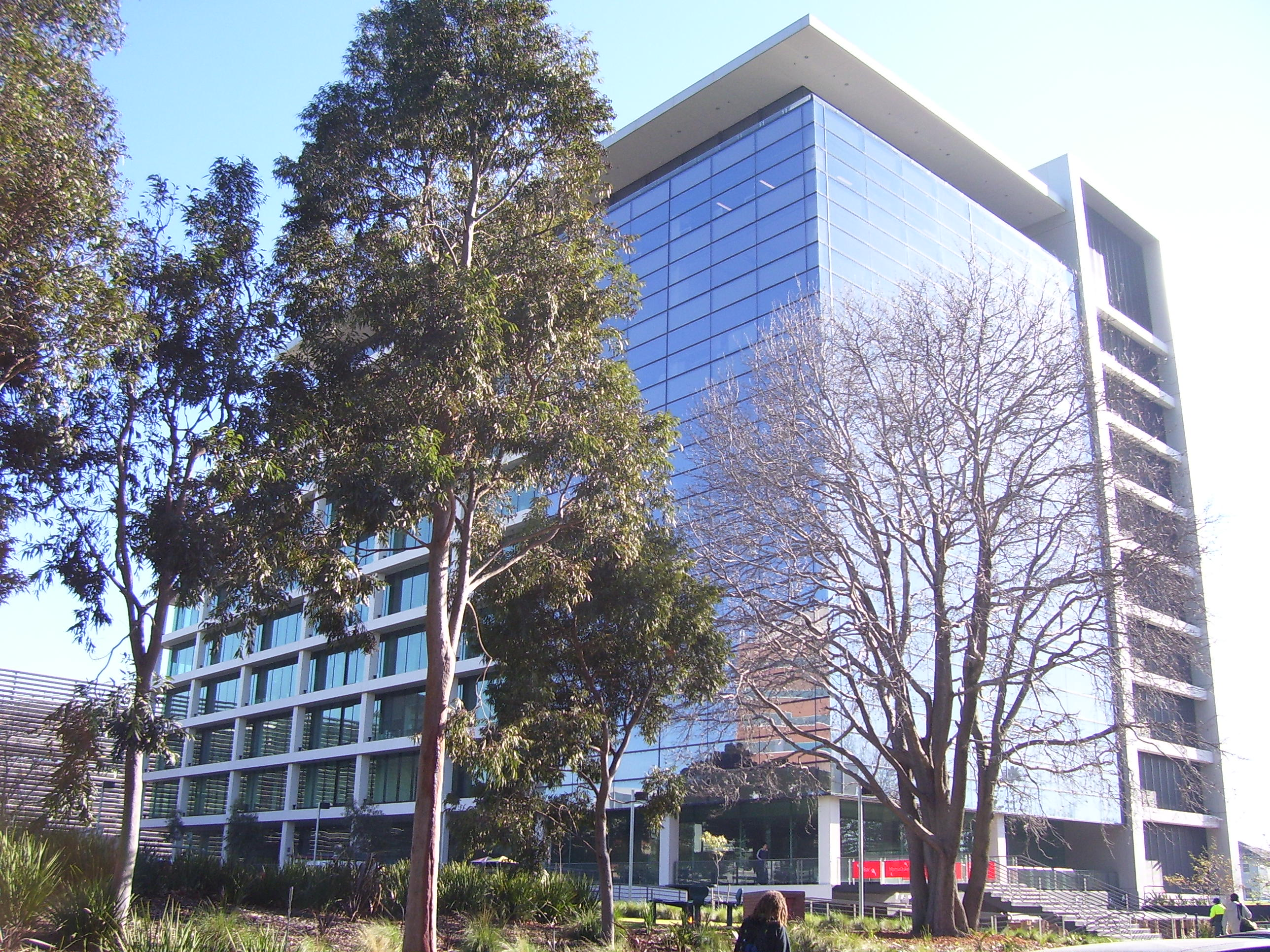
- Monash University, Caulfield campus

- Coordinates: 37.876°S 145.044°E
- Population: 1,293 (2021 census)
  - Density: 990/km^{2} (2,580/sq mi)
- Postcode(s): 3145
- Elevation: 54 m (177 ft)
- Area: 1.3 km^{2} (0.5 sq mi)
- Location: 10 km (6 mi) from Melbourne
- LGA(s): City of Glen Eira
- State electorate(s): Caulfield; Oakleigh
- Federal division(s): Macnamara
Suburbs around Caulfield East:
Caulfield North		Malvern East
	Caulfield East
Caulfield	Glen Huntly	Carnegie

Caulfield East is an inner suburb in Melbourne, Victoria, Australia, 10 km south-east of Melbourne's Central Business District, located within the City of Glen Eira local government area. Caulfield East recorded a population of 1,293 at the 2021 census.

The suburb contains landmarks such as the Caulfield Racecourse, Caulfield railway station, the Caulfield Campus of Monash University and Glen Eira College. The suburb is bounded by Booran Road and Kambrook Road to the west, Dandenong Road to the north, Grange Road to the east and Neerim Road to the south.

== History ==
Caulfield East Post Office opened on 6 December 1888, and was known briefly in 1928 and 1929 as Malvern East.

== Population ==
As of the 2016 census, Caulfield East had a population of 1,584. 43.5% of people were born in Australia. The next most common country of birth was China at 22.7%. 49.8% of people only spoke English at home. Other languages spoken at home included Mandarin at 22.9%. The most common responses for religion were No Religion 45.7% and Catholic 17.4%.

== Shopping ==
Located on Dandenong Road, Caulfield Plaza Shopping Centre features 15 different stores and services, with two of these being anchor tenants. The centre is owned by Monash University which acquired the centre after the purchase of the Chisholm Institute of Technology in 1990.

== See also ==
- City of Caulfield – Caulfield East was previously within this former local government area.
