= Rosstown Railway =

Australian private railway

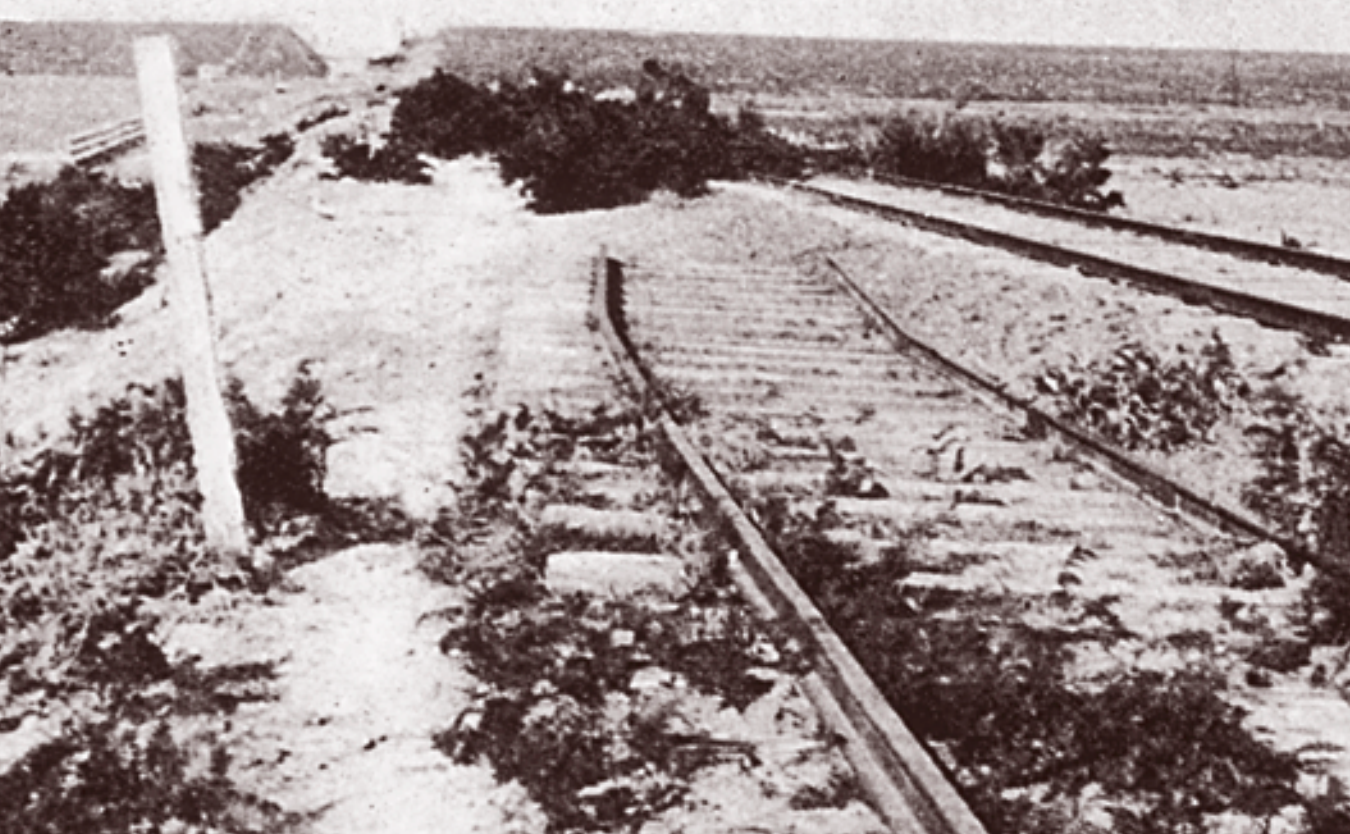
- Part of the railway looking towards Caulfield

Overview
- Status: Dismantled line – Private property, Rosstown Railway Heritage Trail
- Owner: Rosstown Junction Railway & Property Company (1878–1916)
- Locale: Melbourne, Victoria, Australia
- Termini: Elsternwick; Oakleigh
- Connecting lines: Cranbourne, Pakenham, & Sandringham lines Frankston (planned)
- Stations: 3 current station; 4 former station

Service
- Type: Former Melbourne suburban service
- Operator(s): Rosstown Junction Railway & Property Company (1878–1916)

History
- Work began: November 1883
- Opened: 14 November 1888
- Completed: 21 March 1891
- Line disconnected: 1894
- Abandoned: 28 December 1916

Technical
- Line length: ≈ 8 km (4.97 mi)
- Num of tracks: Single track, intended to be double
- Track gauge: 1,600 mm (5 ft 3 in)

The Rosstown Railway was a private railway in the south-eastern suburbs of Melbourne, Australia, running between the current railway stations of Elsternwick, on the Sandringham line, and Oakleigh, on the Pakenham line. The line was built in the late 19th century by William Murray Ross, with the intention of transporting sugar beet to his sugar beet mill, and the refined product to the Port of Melbourne. When the mill failed to begin production, the line fell into disrepair without being used, and it was eventually dismantled, with the land being sold.

== History ==
Artist's impression of the Rosstown sugar beet mill and railway in 1876, before construction had begun

=== Beginnings ===
William Murray Ross was a local entrepreneur and land owner, who was active on the Caulfield Council during the 1860s. He is most often remembered as the man who conceived of the ambitious, and ultimately unsuccessful, Rosstown Project. This consisted of a large-scale sugar beet processing mill, a railway line to serve it, and a residential estate, named after Ross. In 1875, Ross circulated a broadsheet proposal which detailed the project, and began building the mill that same year.

=== Approval for the line ===
Also in 1875, Ross began to seek government approval for a railway to run to the site of his sugar mill from Elsternwick railway station, which was part of the Melbourne and Hobson's Bay United Railway Company (M&HBUR) system. That proposal was rejected and Ross submitted a new one in 1876, this time with the railway to extend past the mill to Oakleigh, which had no rail connection to Melbourne. At the time, a railway to Gippsland was being planned, and with many interested and influential parties involved, the proposal had been a lengthy political saga.

The new Gippsland line was originally planned to run from Elsternwick to Gippsland, using the existing M&HBUR line from Elsternwick to Melbourne. However, the M&HBUR wanted to charge an exorbitant fee for running rights over its tracks, and so eventually it was decided that the railway to Gippsland would link with a station to be built at Oakleigh. While it might have been beneficial to join the Elsternwick and new Gippsland railways with Ross's cross-suburban line, its difficult negotiations with the M&HBUR made the Victorian government hesitant to allow another private railway, and Ross's scheme did not gain approval.

When Graham Berry became Premier of Victoria in 1877, he appointed John Woods, one of Ross' parliamentary supporters, as Minister of Railways. In July of the same year, a group of members of the Victorian Legislative Assembly visited the sugar works and were impressed with the progress of construction. As a result, a select committee was set up to properly investigate the Rosstown Railway proposal. It produced a very favourable report on 8 August 1877. Due to the dispute over the purchase of the M&HBUR by the State of Victoria, many more members of government, included Woods, had become wary of privately owned railways. The result was over twelve months of inaction. However, on 16 October 1878, the bill allowing construction of the Rosstown Railway was passed by the Legislative Assembly. On 14 November it passed all stages in the Legislative Council, and received Royal Assent. One of the stipulations of the bill was that the line was to be completed within five years. On 2 April 1879, the Oakleigh to Gippsland railway was opened.

=== Construction ===
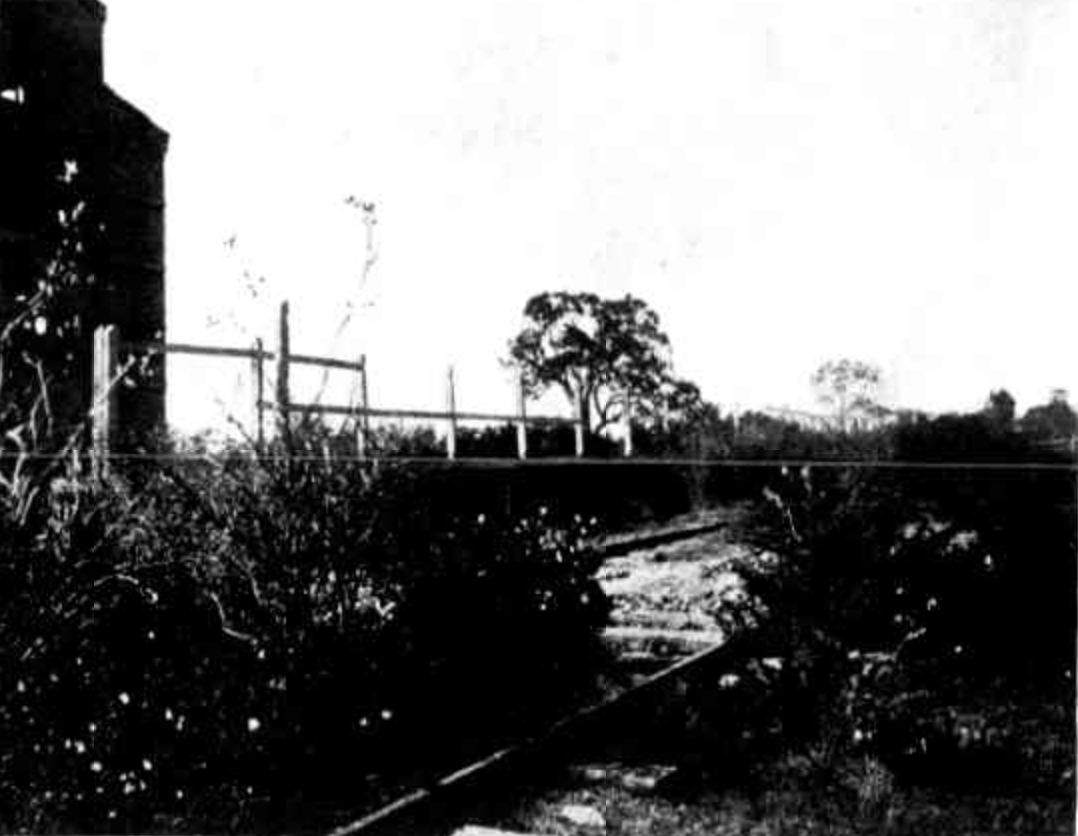
The Sugar Works station

By the time the "Rosstown Junction Railway Act" had been passed, Ross was already in debt and was struggling to raise the capital required to begin construction of the railway. He raised six thousand pounds through the Bank of New Zealand and work finally began in 1883, with the first rails being laid in November. Ross used iron rails from the Victorian Railways which, although lighter than steel rails, were cheaper. The Railways co-operated further by building the Elsternwick and Oakleigh junctions at each end of the new line. However Ross clashed with Railways over the Mordialloc line crossing. Ross planned for a simple flat crossing, but the Victorian Railways refused to allow it. Ross had originally owned the land where the crossing was to be, but had sold it to the Victorian Railways, most likely in an attempt to garner favour.

With the five-year deadline of the act only a matter of weeks away, Ross had no time to continue the argument. Construction became frantic and many corners were cut to save time. Sleepers were laid on raw earth, and were set 12 feet (3.7 metres) apart, instead of the 2-or-3-foot (610 or 910 mm) standard of the time. In some places the sleepers had settled into the earth so far that they did not even touch the rails, and when the supply of the sleepers ran out, posts from nearby fences were used. The last section of track was laid after sunset on the last day of the five-year period in 1883. Ross had received permission to exclude the contentious Mordialloc line crossing, which was still missing, and so construction was technically completed within the set time. The Mordialloc line had opened two years previously, with a temporary crossing over the Rosstown railway.

An article in The Argus described the scene in 1884:

The work itself is remarkably incomplete, and displays a charming disregard of the ordinary requirements in railway construction. There is not an inch of ballast from one end to the other, the sleepers are old, and the rails the cast-off stock of the Government lines. For the greater part of the distance the permanent way consists of a slight earth formation laid on the natural surface of the ground, and in many places the top is so narrow that the sleepers project over the sides. There is one good-sized cutting at the back of the Caulfield racecourse, from which about 10,000 square yards of material have been removed, and about a mile and a half from Elsternwick is the only "bank" worth speaking of. For the whole length there are two wooden culverts and one drain, but no ditches or gutters to preserve the earthwork from the destruction now progressing through the accumulation of large quantities of water. The sleepers, bad as they are, have been sparingly used. On regulation, well-ballasted lines, the maximum interval between the timbers is about 3ft, if not less. On the Rosstown line there is a space of 12ft between them, and the rails are only spiked to them alternately. The fish-plates which hold the rails together have four bolt-holes each, but only contain two bolts, and the spikes are only driven half home. If the line were to be made use of, everything but the earth and the gates would have to be removed, and then a very large expenditure would be necessary to make the work suitable or the reception of new sleepers and rails. Without reckoning the cost of the land, it is estimated that the line cost something under £1,000 per mile.

=== Reconstruction ===
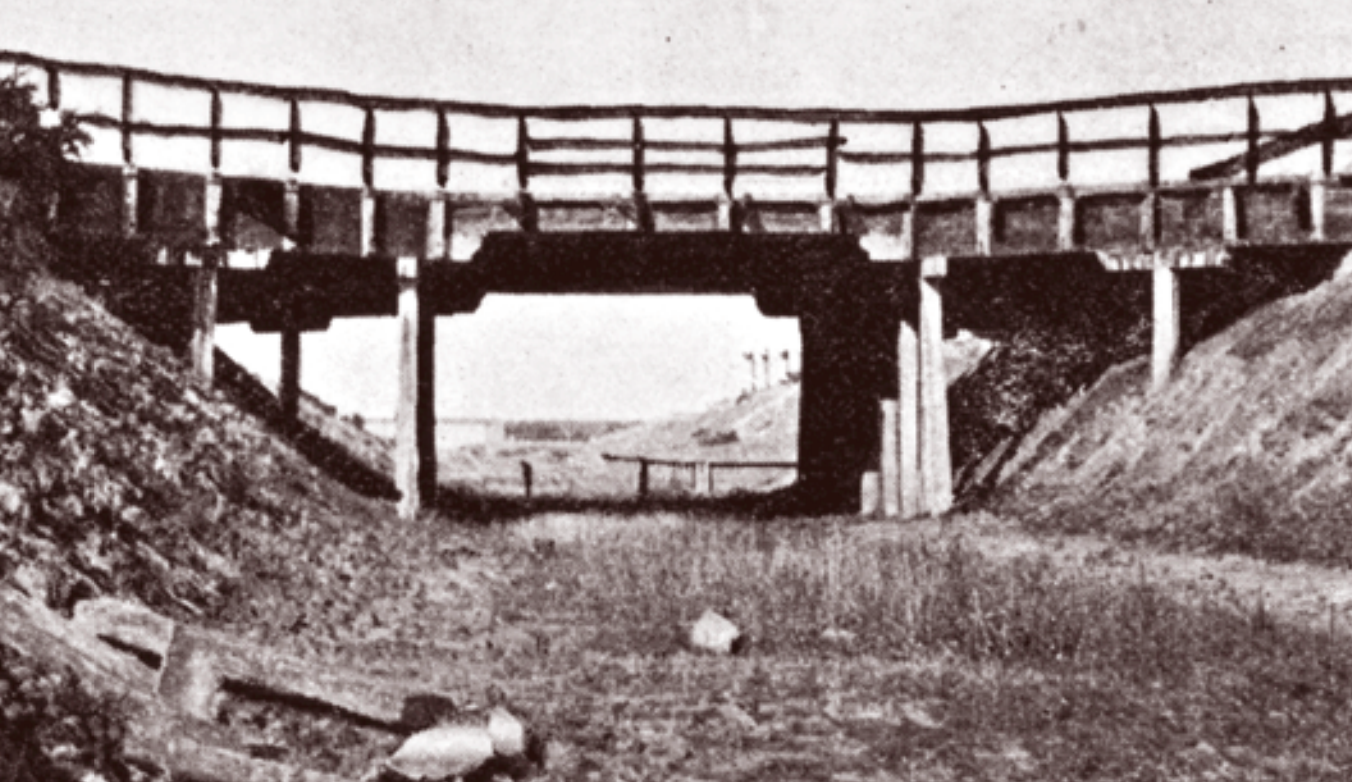
The Bambra Road bridge

In early 1884, Ross flirted with the idea of extending his railway from Elsternwick to the shore of Port Phillip Bay at Elwood ("Sea Beach"), and then north to St Kilda, over the Elwood Swamp (Map of Proposed Extension). Though it received support from Elwood and St Kilda locals, the idea did not get far. Ross then sought another five-year extension to his rights under the 1878 Act. This was granted, the new act being given Royal Assent on 12 December 1884.

However, with his already substantial debt, Ross offered the railway for sale to the Victorian Railways for an unknown sum. When that was rejected, Ross reduced the price two months later to £25,000, and then dropped it to £20,000 a week after that. The Victorian Railways Commissioners were pushing for the State to own all railways, and a purchase bill was submitted to Parliament. However the bill was withdrawn when it was successfully argued that it was too great a risk to buy a poorly constructed railway that was not even operating. By the end of 1885, already two years into his five-year extension, Ross became resigned to the fact that he was going to have to construct the line properly.

With credit running out, Ross carried out the reconstruction when he could, but it was soon obvious that he was not going to meet the new deadline. There another setback in 1886 when an agreement was reached with the Victorian Railways about raising the Mordialloc line to cross the Rosstown Line on a bridge. Ross was to arrange and pay for the necessary work, with the Victorian Railways reimbursing him two-thirds of the cost upon completion. Initially, to keep expenditure down, Ross planned to provide a simple wooden bridge, but that was unacceptable to the Railways, and a tender was advertised to have an engineering firm design and construct an iron bridge. The total project cost came to £5,850. The single-track bridge was opened on 17 June 1887, and widened to a double-track one in 1888.

On 17 November 1888, the last day of the five-year extension, the Rosstown Railway line reconstruction was still not finished. Ross wrote to the Victorian Railways telling them that the line would be completed in approximately three months, after which he would settle the many and various outstanding debts he had with them.

=== Rolling stock ===
Although the Rosstown Railway has become infamous as an abject failure, the tracks were used from time to time. Construction and ballast trains were often on the line in the late 1880s and early 1890s, hauled by Victorian Railways locomotives that had been hired by Ross. The largest of these was a Y-class locomotive that was used on ballasting runs. Tenders had been let for the construction of rolling stock to be used by Ross, but nothing ever came of those.

As for passenger trains, authors of the Rosstown Historical Research Group's book, Return to Rosstown, note:

Ross was well aware of [the] "problems" associated with his "Statutory Date". In autobiographical notes penned some years later, he claimed that on 14 November 1888 he hired two carriages from the Victorian Railways, and using one of the company locomotives ran what is known as the best-known feature of the Rosstown railway stories—the "only" train—that is, of course, besides the numerous other trains for construction purposes between September 1888 and March 1891.
According to Ross, passengers on his train included Thomas Bent, and the well-known legal men, Malleson and Riggall. He said that the train ran from the platform at Elsternwick and ". . . ran to Oakleigh platform, stayed a while for refreshments, and went back to Grange Road where the company got out and adjourned to Mr. Ross's house, where they dined. This is mentioned as proof that the line was constructed and in such a substantial manner as to permit of a heavy engine drawing two loaded carriages to pass over it . . ."
It is rather odd that not one of the Melbourne daily papers, nor any of the local weekly papers, mentions this run. The Brighton Southern Cross, at least, always reported Rosstown Railway work quite fully. One reason for the lack of publicity might well have been Ross's wish to avoid the attention of the Board of Land and Works to what was probably an illegal train running. In any case, there had been much movement of men and materials on the line since September, so the significance of the run may have been overlooked by the Board.
Ross's own account of the "first train"—that is, for the carriage of passengers—stands up to careful checking much better than all the other versions, printed and otherwise. One of the more detailed of these is Isaac Selby's potted history of Ross and Rosstown. It forms one small part of his 1924 work, "The Old Pioneers' Memorial History of Melbourne". Selby postulated a link between the occasion of Ross's second wedding and the running of the first "train"; however, he notes that the idea was handed down. In fact, this is substance of almost every account passed down by word of mouth to certain of the older residents of Caulfield and Carnegie. The tradition is in error. That wedding was in February 1889. In any case, the newspapers in reporting the movements of the wedding party from Holy Trinity Church, East Melbourne, to "The Grange", Rosstown, made no mention of the required two stages of rail travel.

As far as is known, the last locomotive-hauled train was a ballast train run on 21 March 1891.

=== Decline ===
Although there were severe financial penalties for missing the deadline, these were never enforced, even with Ross' history of financial troubles with the Victorian Railways. Some historians say that this was because the 1880s saw a land boom in Melbourne and its rapidly expanding suburban areas, and the consequent increase in the value of any land served by rail was eagerly anticipated. Ross still hoped to complete his Rosstown Project, even though the mill had been sitting dormant for many years, full of equipment that had never been used, minus a few losses to burglary in 1889.

During the 1890s, Ross continued to try and recover financially, setting up companies from which to hide debt and obtain more credit, none of which were successful. He tried several times to sell the Rosstown Railway to the Victorian Railways, but with the 1890s depression that followed the boom of the previous decade, no-one saw any future for a line that crossed empty paddocks and would see no real traffic.

Ross held onto the line until his death in 1904. His failed sugar beet mill, which had been known for many years as "Ross' Folly", was demolished in 1908.

=== End of the line ===
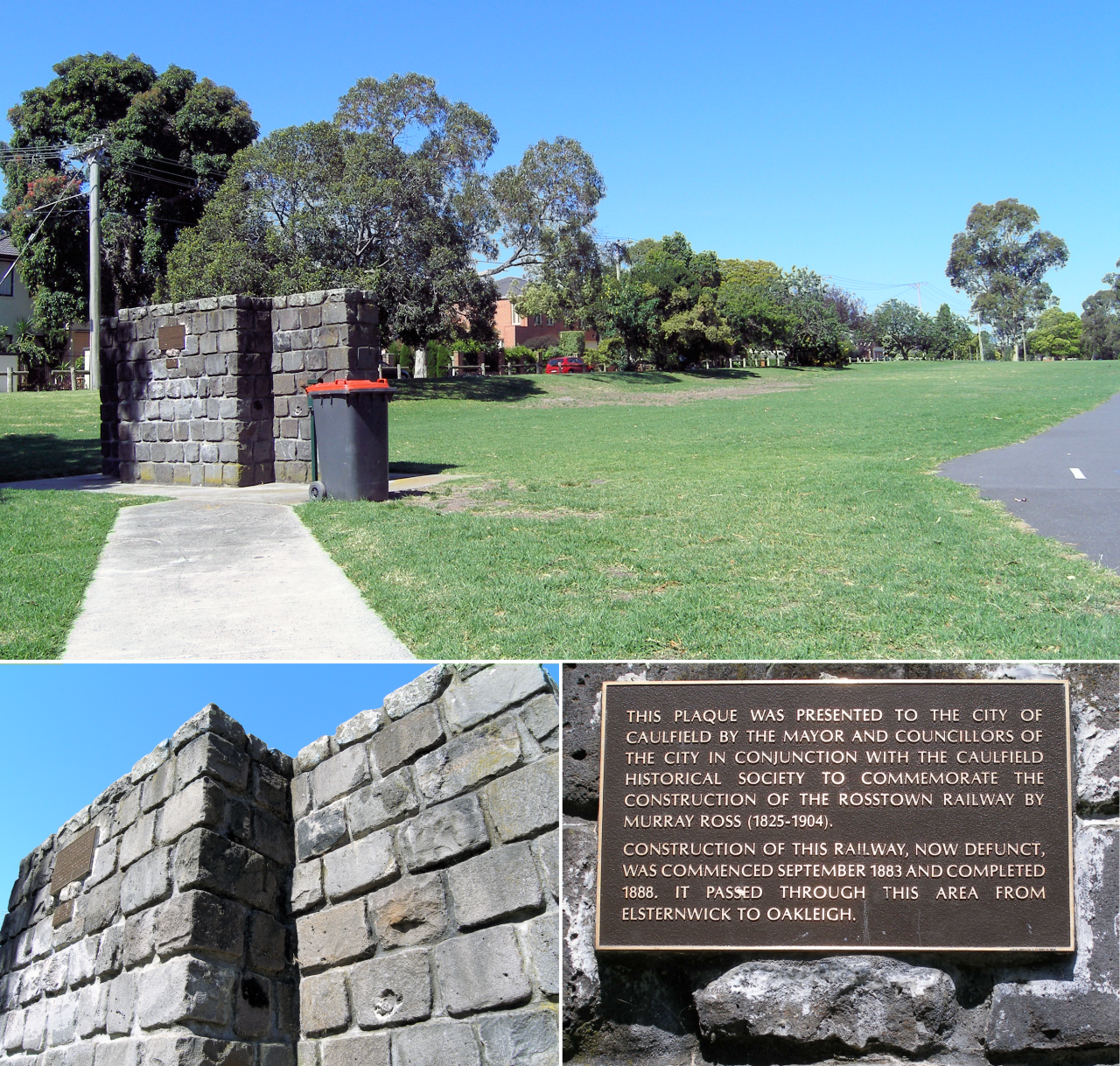
Commemorative plaque in South Reserve at Marara Road, where the line once ran, marking the centenary of the start of construction

The National Bank of Australasia offered the line at auction in 1906, with a reserve set at £20,000, but there were no takers. Thomas Bent made an offer of £17,000, which the Bank was ready to agree to when Bent withdrew. In 1911 the Gardenvale and East Elsternwick Progress Association approached the National Bank and negotiated a price in the hope of re-opening the line, with the support of the City of Caulfield. A survey of the line estimated that the cost of repairing and reopening it would be more than £60,000. With no hope of raising that much capital, the idea was abandoned.

Five years later, the Caulfield Council asked the government to repeal the two Rosstown Junction Railway Acts and that was done in December 1916. Legally, the Rosstown Railway no longer existed. The rails were pulled up and sold to the Emu Bay Railway in Tasmania. The National Bank began to dispose of the land in 1910, but it was not until 1946 that the last portion was disposed of. The Caulfield Council was among the purchasers, turning some of the railway reserve into roads, and what is now Ormond Park, as well as the site of a rubbish tip and incinerator.

== Today ==
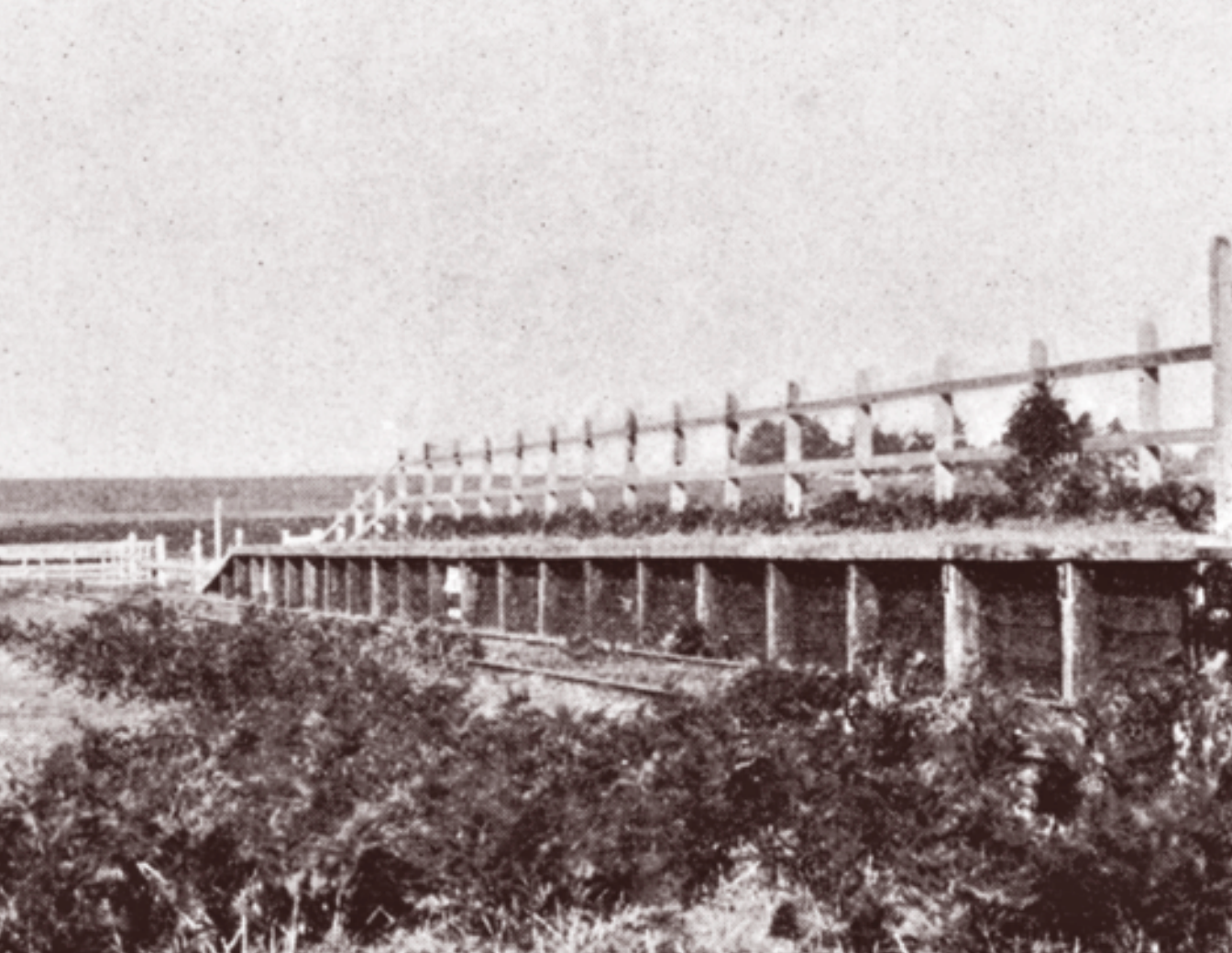
The Hawthorn Road station

Much of the former railway line can be traced through Council reserves and roads that were built where the track once ran. The centenary of the start of construction of the line was celebrated in 1983 with the unveiling of a plaque in South Reserve at Marara Road, one of the more obvious locations where the line once ran. The Glen Eira Council now manages and promotes the Rosstown Railway Heritage Trail as a bicycle route and historical walk.

=== Station histories ===
Station	Opened	Closed	Age	Notes
Elsternwick	19 December 1859		166 years	
Garden Vale	14 November 1888			1 train only
Hawthorn Road	14 November 1888			1 train only
Booran Road	14 November 1888			1 train only
Sugar Works	14 November 1888			1 train only
Carnegie	14 May 1879		147 years	Formerly Rosstown
Oakleigh	8 October 1877		149 years	

== Diagram ==
Diagram of the Rosstown Railway and stations as eventually constructed. Land owned by William Ross shaded grey.

== See also ==
- List of closed railway stations in Melbourne
