= Caulfield railway station =

Railway station in Melbourne, Australia

Caulfield
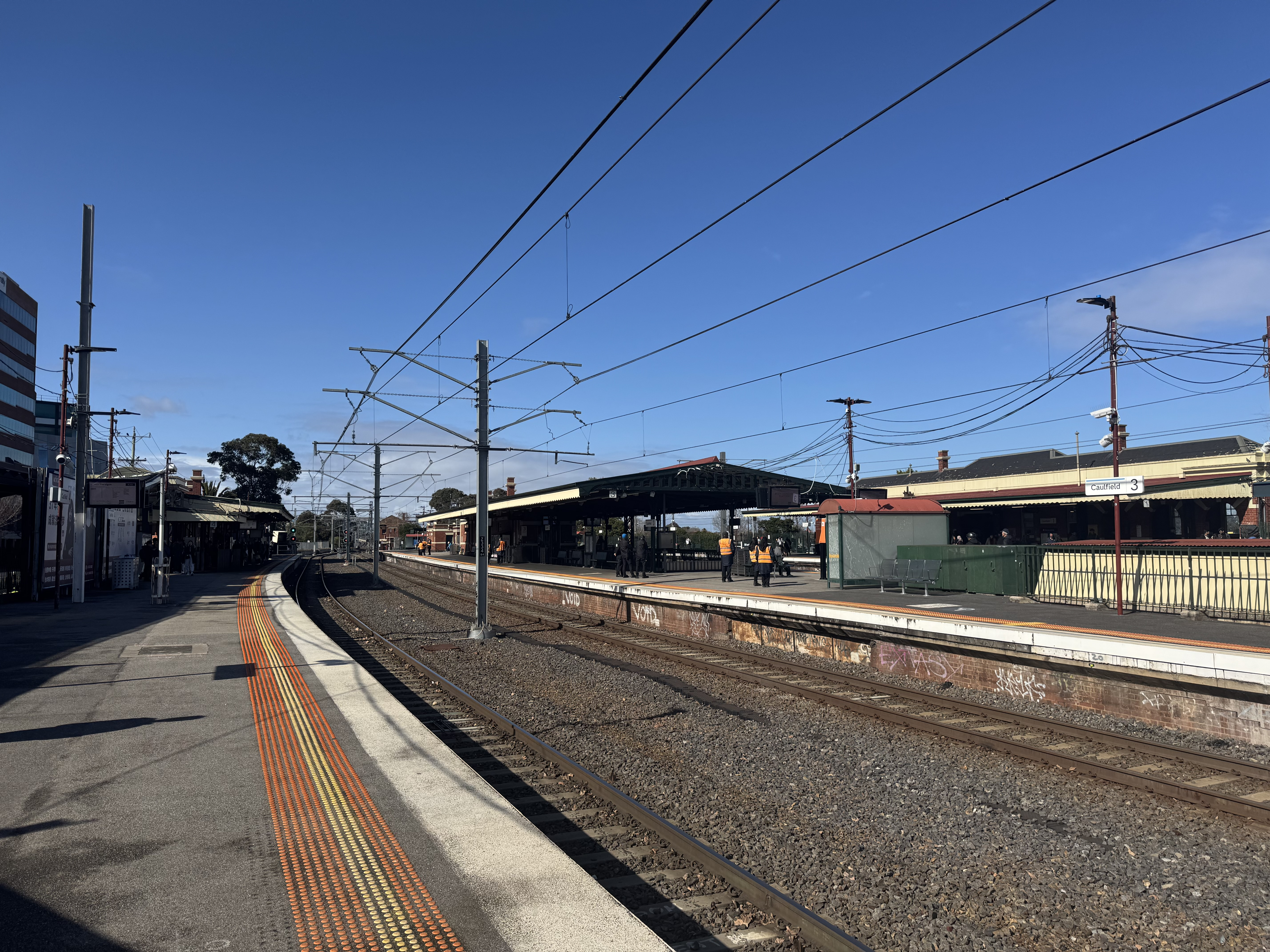
- South-east bound view from Platform 4, August 2025

General information
- Location: 1 Sir John Monash Drive, Caulfield East, Melbourne, City of Glen Eira, Victoria; Australia
- Coordinates: 37°52′38″S 145°02′32″E
- System: PTV commuter and regional rail station
- Owner: VicTrack
- Operator: Metro Trains
- Lines: Cranbourne Pakenham; Frankston; Gippsland
- Distance: 11.79 kilometres from Southern Cross
- Platforms: 4 (2 side, 1 island)
- Tracks: 4
- Train operators: Metro Trains; V/Line
- Connections: Tram; Bus

Construction
- Structure type: Ground
- Parking: 130 spaces
- Cycle facilities: 26 protected racks plus more unprotected
- Accessible: No—steep ramp

Other information
- Status: Operational, premium station
- Station code: CFD
- Fare zone: Myki zone 1
- Website: Public Transport Victoria

History
- Opened: 7 May 1879; 147 years ago
- Rebuilt: 1914
- Electrified: 5 March 1922 (1500 V DC overhead)

Passengers
- 2017–2018: 4,708,018
- 2018–2019: 4,175,031 ▼11.32%
- 2019–2020: 2,853,200 ▼31.66%
- 2020–2021: 1,370,650 ▼51.96%
- 2021–2022: 1,874,050 ▲36.72%
- 2022–2023: 2,668,350 ▲42.38%
- 2023–2024: 2,909,850 ▲9.05%
- 2024–2025: 3,205,100 ▲10.15%

Services
Preceding station	Metro Trains	Following station
Services to Town Hall
Malvern towards Watergardens or Sunbury via Metro Tunnel	Cranbourne line	Carnegie towards Cranbourne or East Pakenham
Malvern towards Watergardens or Sunbury via Metro Tunnel	Pakenham line	Carnegie towards Cranbourne or East Pakenham
Services to Flinders Street
Malvern towards Flinders Street via City Loop	Frankston line	Glen Huntly towards Frankston
Malvern towards Flinders Street via City Loop	Frankston line Weekday peak express services	Cheltenham One-way operation
South Yarra One-way operation	Frankston line Weekday peak express services	Cheltenham towards Frankston
Preceding station	V/Line	Following station
Richmond towards Southern Cross	Gippsland line	Clayton towards Traralgon or Bairnsdale
Richmond towards Southern Cross	Gippsland line Bairnsdale express	Dandenong towards Bairnsdale

Victorian Heritage Register
- Official name: Caulfield Railway Station Complex
- Type: Registered place
- Criteria: a., b., c., d., e.
- Designated: 20 August 1982
- Reference no.: VHR H1665
- Heritage overlay no.: HO78
- Category: Transport - Rail
Track layout
Location

Caulfield station is a railway station operated by Metro Trains Melbourne and V/Line railway station on the Pakenham, Cranbourne, Frankston, and Gippsland lines, part of the Melbourne rail network and Victoria's regional rail network. It serves the northern boundary of Caulfield East, a suburb of Melbourne, Victoria, Australia. Opened in 1879 and rebuilt from 1913 to 1914, the station complex was added to the Victorian Heritage Register on 20 August 1982 in recognition of its architectural, aesthetic, social and historical importance, and is noted as an example of Federation Free Style architecture. It is named after the nearby suburb of Caulfield, located southwest of the station.

The station consists of an island platform and two side platforms, all accessed by a pedestrian underpass. There are three principal station buildings located on the platforms, including a small brick building located on Platform 1, near the main platform building. This building was provided in 1974 and originally served as a ticket office for the Caulfield Racecourse, which is directly adjacent. The station complex also features a rare "horse platform" used when horses were delivered to the racecourse. The station is only partially accessible due to a steep access ramp.

The station connects to the Route 3 tram service and routes 624 and 900 bus services. The journey to Flinders Street railway station is approximately 10 kilometres (6.2 mi) and takes 19 minutes.

== Description ==
Caulfield railway station is on the boundary of Caulfield East and Malvern East, suburbs of Melbourne, Victoria. North of the station is Dandenong Road, and south of the station is Normanby Road. The station is located nearby to the Caulfield Village apartment and shopping complex, Caulfield Racecourse, and Monash University. The station is owned by VicTrack, a state government agency, and the station is primarily operated by Metro Trains. The station is approximately 10 kilometres (6.2 mi), or a 19-minute train journey, from Flinders Street railway station. The adjacent stations are Malvern station up towards Melbourne and Carnegie and Glen Huntly stations down towards Dandenong or Frankston.

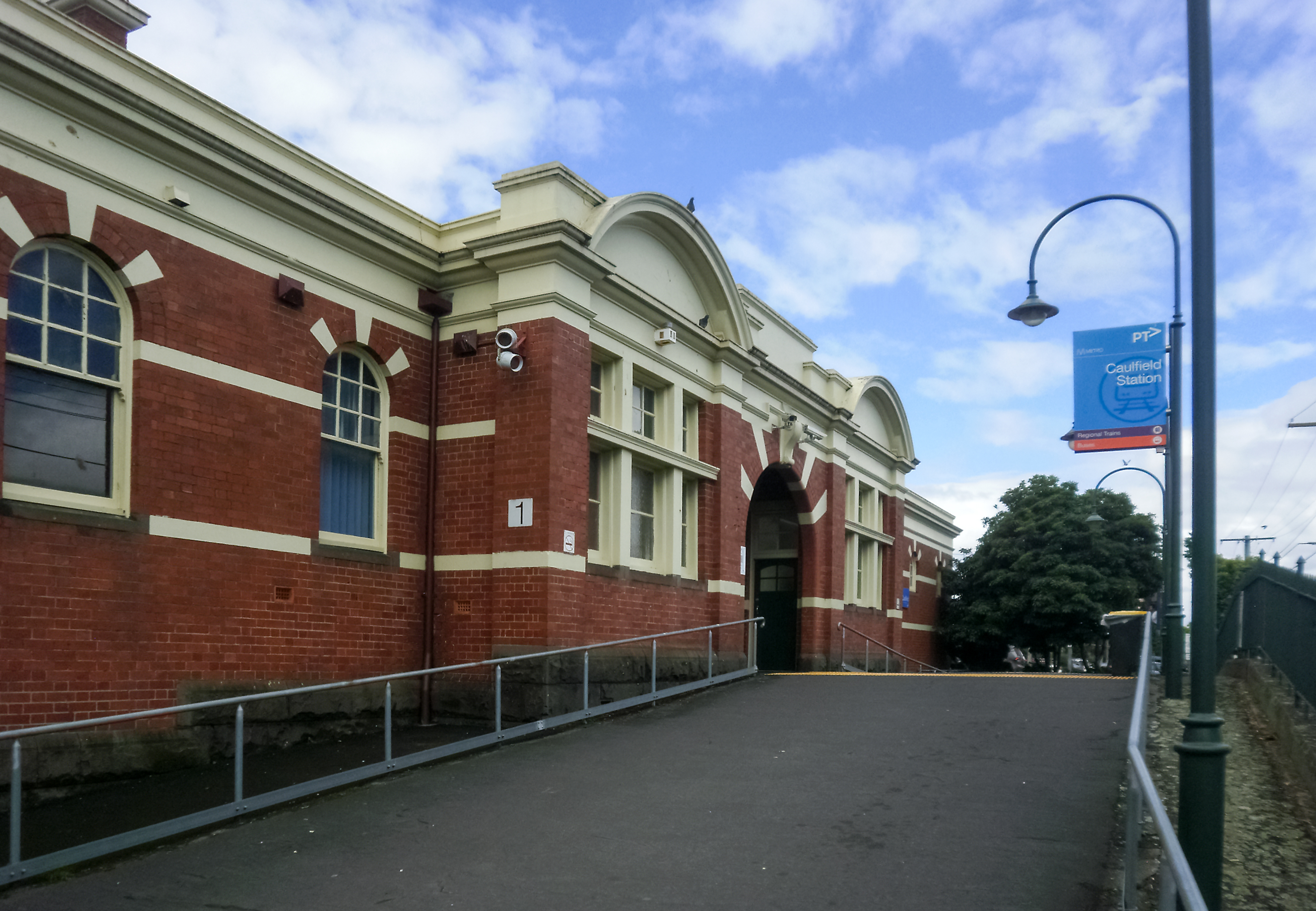
The heritage listed station building to Platform 1, 2021

Designed by railway architect J. W. Hardy, the station complex was built in 1913–1914 in the Federation Free Classical style. The station consists of a single island platform and two side platforms with a total of four platform edges. Standard in Melbourne, the platform has an asphalt surface with concrete on the edges. The platforms are approximately 160 metres (520 ft) long, enough for a 7-car HCMT. The station has a pedestrian subway, accessed from the centre of the platforms by a ramp. In addition to the four passenger platforms, there is a horse platform which Heritage Council Victoria notes is "a rare structure of its type" although its physical characteristics are "undistinguished". The Caulfield Railway Complex has three principal station buildings, a former lamp/store room, and a signal box that are contained within the heritage detail. Unique architectural features in the three red brick station buildings include elaborately decorated parapets and radiating bands of render around the arched openings. Original fittings that have been retained from the 1914 station reconstruction include the timber palisade gates, timber seating, and ticket office fittings. The signal box was built around 1920. Constructed out of red brick, it has a tiled hip roof and retains its original fittings.

The station building, platform, and underpass are largely the same as when originally built, with the main changes being updated signage, technology, and the addition of two new ramp canopies, amongst other minor building and platform upgrades. There is a small 130-space car park on the south side of the station. The station is listed as an "assisted access" station on the Metro Trains website, as the access ramp is too steep and would require assistance for wheelchair customers to traverse.

== History ==
Caulfield station opened on 7 May 1879, with the station consisting of a single platform and track for commuter and freight service. The first station buildings were opened on the site between 1881 and 1883 to coincide with the duplication of track between the city and Oakleigh. The current station was constructed in 1913–1914 to provide new and improved facilities for a station that was facing rapidly increasing growth. The station rebuild was part of level crossing removal works that removed all level crossings, rebuilt all stations, and quadruplicated the corridor between South Yarra and Caulfield by 1914. In late 1922, the line was electrified using 1500 V DC overhead wires, with "three position" signalling also introduced.

Caulfield station platform and signal box, c. 1915

The station has mostly stayed the same since 1914, with only minor upgrades taking place. In 1977, the goods yard and loading platform was closed to traffic. This platform had been used for cargo, postal, farming, and Caulfield Racecourse horse deliveries during its operational life; however, it was decommissioned after the reduction in use. In 1985, a number of sidings and their associated points and signals were abolished. The station underwent minor upgrades in 1994 and 2015–2016, and in June 1996, it was upgraded to a premium station. In July 2022, the signal box at the station was closed, with operations handled remotely from the Kananook signal control centre.

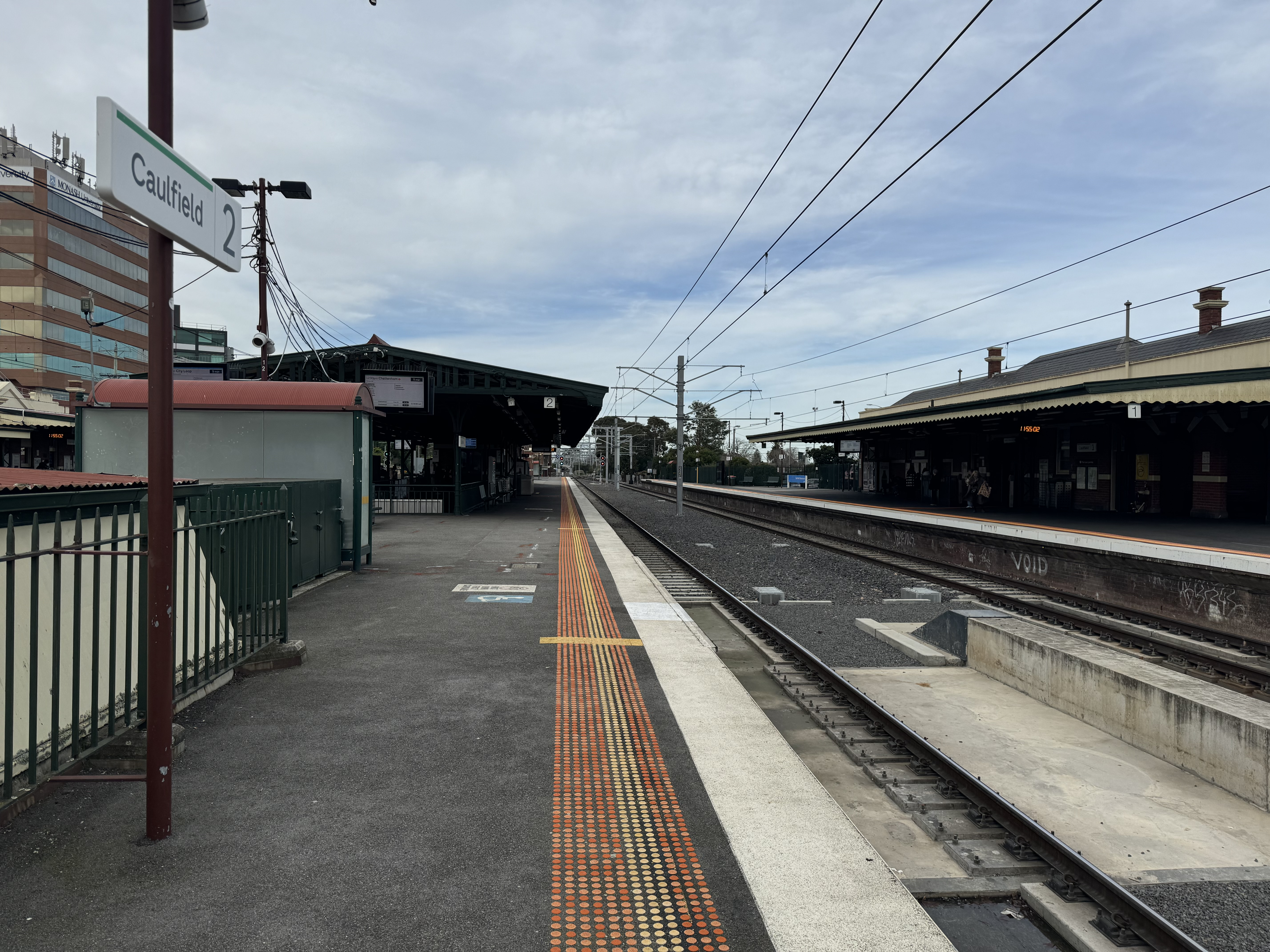
The current station today—South-east bound view from Platform 2, July 2024

In conjunction with the Metro Tunnel project, Caulfield station has received upgrades to its heritage structures, platforms, ticketing facilities, and signage. These projects have been undertaken to make Caulfield station into a hub and major interchange station. Despite these upgrades, many news outlets and public transport commentators have called for more drastic upgrades to the station, including making the station fully accessible, increasing connectivity to other modes of transport, and reducing overcrowding that is often faced at the station.

=== Caulfield railway disaster ===
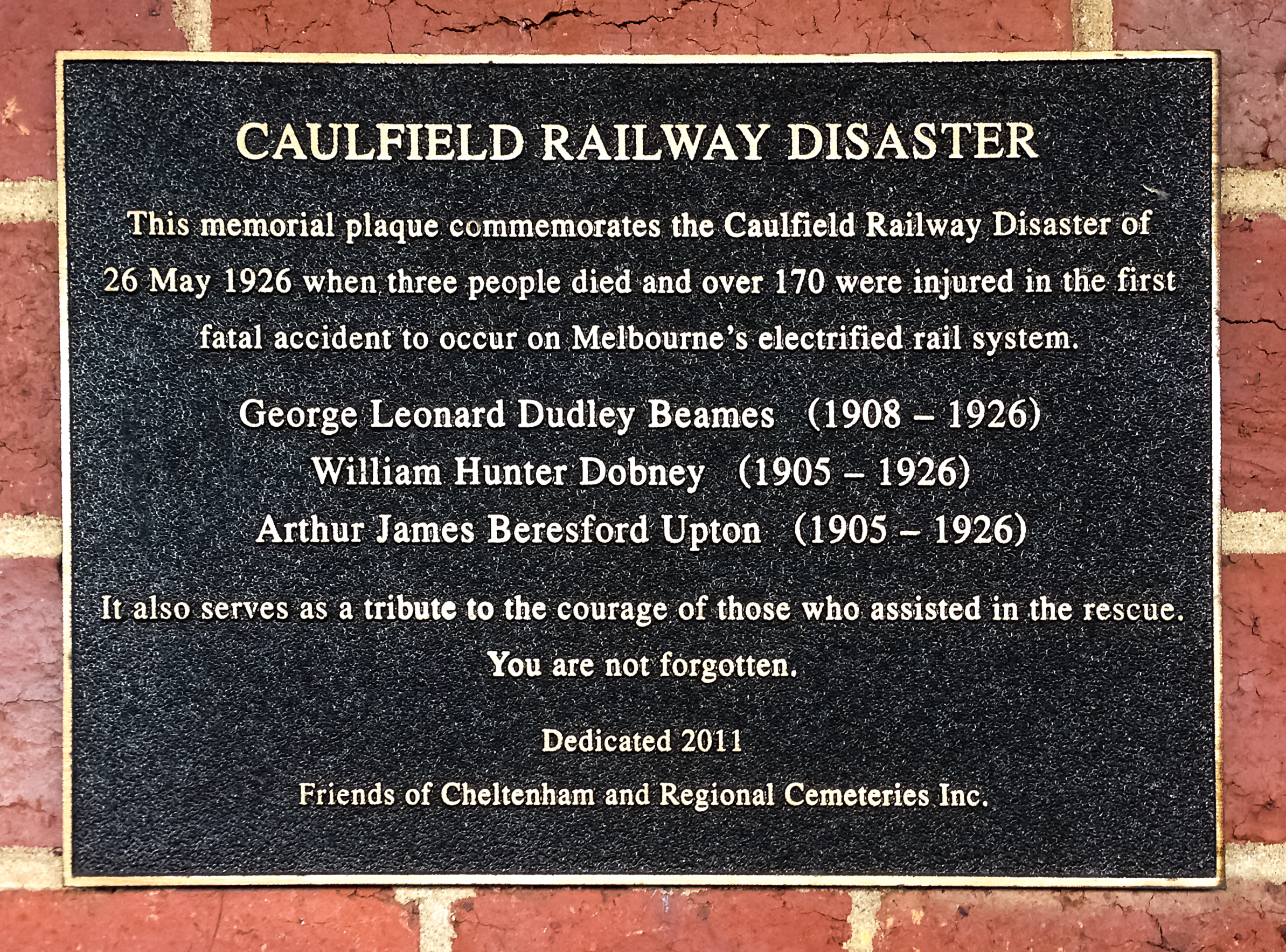
A plaque on Platform 4 commemorating the Caulfield railway disaster

On 26 May 1926, the 6:02 pm Oakleigh-bound train crashed into the rear of a stationary Carrum-bound train at Platform 4 of the station. It was the first fatal collision to occur on the newly electrified rail system in Melbourne. Three people died and about 170 people were injured.

The coroner found that, "the weight of evidence is certainly against the driver in a more serious degree, and perhaps to a lesser degree against the guard." On 12 September 1926, the relieving stationmaster, who had been on duty at the time of the crash, shot and killed himself on the island platform. Later that month, a court found the driver and the guard of the Oakleigh train not guilty of manslaughter, with the rider that, "In the opinion of the jury, from the evidence given regarding the running of electric trains, the precautions taken to safeguard the public at this particular point are inadequate, and should be rectified immediately."

Seven years after the fatal crash, an automatic trip system, which applied the brakes on trains entering a section against a signal, was installed at Caulfield station.

In 2011, a plaque was unveiled on Platform 4 by the Friends of Cheltenham and Regional Cemeteries in memory of the victims of the crash.

== Platforms and services ==
Caulfield has two side platforms and one island platform with four faces. The station is currently served by Pakenham, Cranbourne, and Frankston line trains and is also served by V/Line Traralgon and Bairnsdale services. Caulfield station is served by the Pakenham, Cranbourne, and Frankston lines on the metropolitan train network and the Gippsland line on the regional V/Line network. The Pakenham line runs between East Pakenham station and Town Hall station and then onto the Sunbury line. The Cranbourne line also follows a similar route, joining the Pakenham line at Dandenong before continuing to the city. The Frankston line runs from Frankston station south east of Melbourne, joining the Cranbourne and Pakenham lines at Caulfield station before continuing onto Flinders Street station via the City Loop. The station is also serviced by V/Line's Gippsland line heading up towards Southern Cross station or down towards Traralgon or Bairnsdale stations. From 2029, Airport services will stop at Caulfield station.

=== Metropolitan ===
Caulfield platform arrangement
Platform	Line	Destination	Via	Service Type	Source
1	Frankston line	Flinders Street	City Loop	All stations and limited express services	
2	Frankston line	Cheltenham, Mordialloc, Carrum or Frankston		All stations and limited express services	
3	Cranbourne line Pakenham line	West Footscray, Watergardens or Sunbury	Town Hall	Limited express services	
4	Cranbourne line Pakenham line	Westall, Dandenong, East Pakenham or Cranbourne		All stations and limited express services	

=== Regional ===
Caulfield platform arrangement
Platform	Line	Destination	Via	Notes	Source
3	Gippsland line	Southern Cross	Flinders Street	Set down only	
4	Gippsland line	Traralgon or Bairnsdale		Pick up only	

== Transport links ==
Caulfield station has one tram connection and two bus connections. The route 3 tram service operates from nearby Derby road up towards the city and down towards East Malvern. The station has two bus connections; route 624 from Kew to Oakleigh station and the route 900 SmartBus from Caulfield station to Stud Park Shopping Centre in Rowville. The station does not have an accessible tram platform or a bus interchange and instead is operated through on-street bus and tram stops. Caulfield station is also a major hub for train replacement bus and coach services due to the junction located east of the station. The station has numerous train replacement bus and coach stops located north and south of the station, with the ability for the southern carpark to be converted into a transfer point.

Tram connections
Yarra Trams operates one route via Caulfield station:

- : Melbourne University – East Malvern

Bus connections
CDC Melbourne operates two bus routes via Caulfield station, under contract to Transport Victoria:

- 624 : Kew – Oakleigh station
- SmartBus 900 : to Stud Park Shopping Centre (Rowville) (shared with Ventura)

Ventura Bus Lines operates one bus route via Caulfield station, under contract to Transport Victoria:

- SmartBus 900 : to Stud Park Shopping Centre (Rowville) (shared with CDC Melbourne)
