= Len Andrews (Australian footballer) =

Australian rules footballer

Personal information
- Full name: Leonard William Andrews
- Born: 4 November 1922; Elsternwick, Victoria
- Died: 12 August 2010 (aged 87)
- Original team: Carnegie
- Height: 180 cm (5 ft 11 in)
- Weight: 80 kg (176 lb)

Playing career^{1}
Years	Club	Games (Goals)
1946–48	Hawthorn	31 (5)
- ^{1} Playing statistics correct to the end of 1948.

Leonard William Andrews (4 November 1922 – 12 August 2010) was an Australian rules footballer who played with Hawthorn in the Victorian Football League (VFL).

== Personal life ==
Andrews served as a signalman in the Australian Army during the Second World War.
