= William Murray Ross =

Melburnian entrepreneur

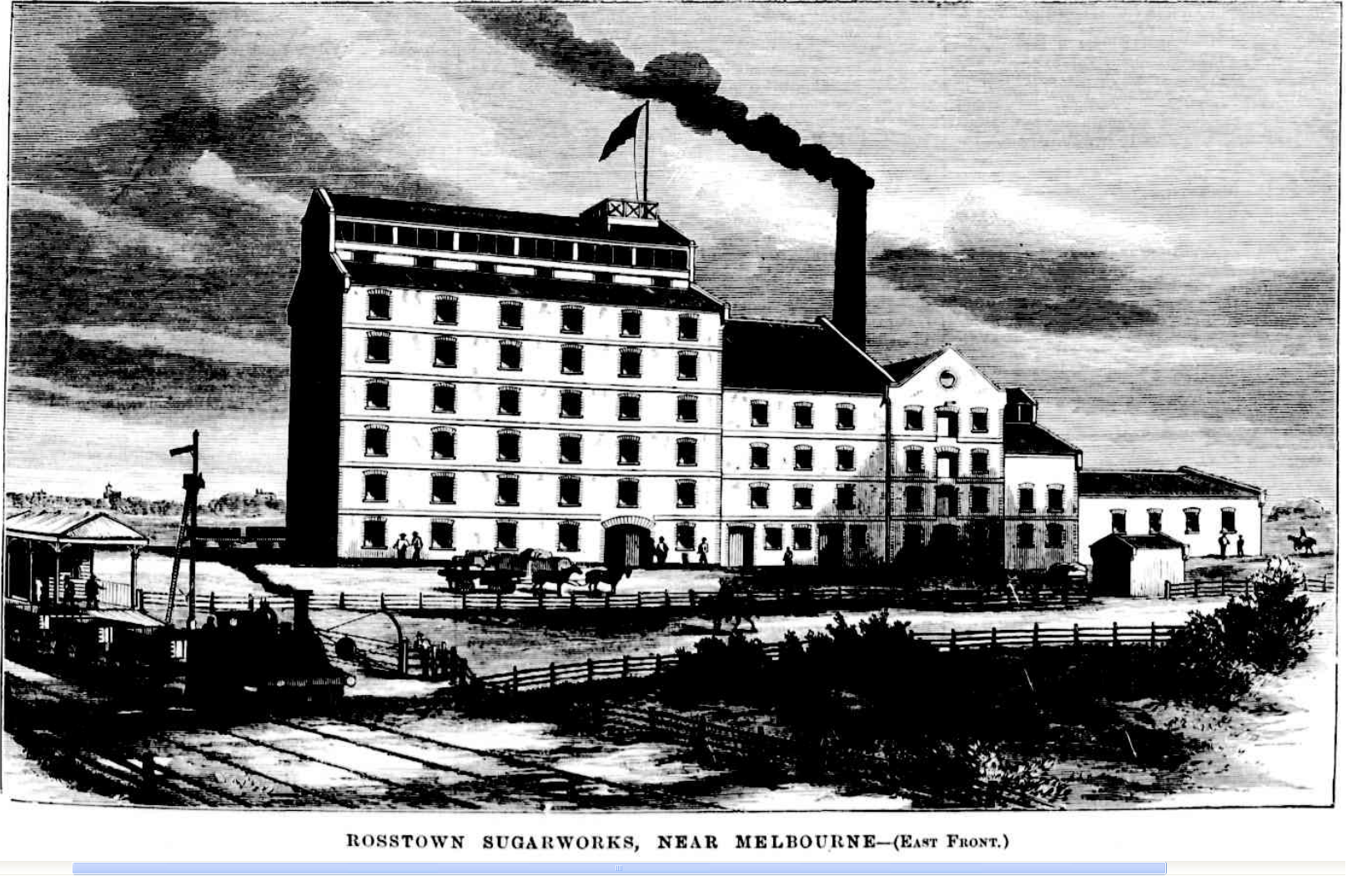
The sugar beet processing mill built as part of "the Rosstown Project".

William Murray Ross (1825–1904) was an entrepreneur best remembered for his failed "Rosstown Railway" in the south-eastern suburbs of Melbourne. The railway was part of a larger "Rosstown Project", which included a sugar beet processing mill and a residential estate. Parts of the rail line easement have been preserved as the Rosstown Railway Heritage Trail.

Ross was born in 1825 in Liverpool, England, He was an insurance broker for the Liverpool, London and Globe Insurance Company, and moved to Melbourne in 1852, working at the company's Collins Street office. In 1857, Ross began buying land for future subdivision and development. Purchasing 20 acres (8 hectares) in the middle of Caulfield, he went on to buy a further 200 acres (80 hectares) acres in 1859, and then a massive 1,000 acres (400 hectares). By the mid-1860s, he was the primary holder of more than one-fifth of Caulfield, worth about £20,000.

In 1875, he launched his new suburb of Rosstown, running this advertisement in the Argus:

THE NEW SUBURB of ROSSTOWN SHIRE of CAULFIELD.

MURRAY ROSS Has CONVERTED his ESTATE into a TOWNSHIP.

High land, with beautiful sea views for dwellings. Excellent metalled roads. Distance from Elsternwick Railway Station, commencing at 1½ miles. Threepenny omnibus fares from Elsternwick Station.

Free passes by the Melbourne and Hobson's Bay Railway for 10 years for houses costing £1000, and for shorter periods for smaller houses. Two express trains in the morning and two in the evening, only 12 minutes from town. A new line of railway—the Rosstown Junction— to be made from Elsternwick to the sugar-works, to have three stations in this suburb.

Price of land one-half to one-fourth the price in other suburbs, viz. from £50 to £100 per acre Purchasing the land without capital on long timo payments, repayable over 6, 8, 10 or 12 years, in fortnightly, quarterly, &c. payments. Three-fourths advanced of the cost of building large houses, and about one-half for cottages, repayable as in the case of the land. Sums advanced up to £2000, or more, for a gentleman's residence, £200, or more, for a workman's or gardener's cottage. Three-acre blocks for gentlemen's houses. One-acre blocks for worbmen's cottages.

Six to nine acre blocks for market-gardens The best soil for market-gardens round Melbourne. A sugar-works in their very midst, to buy the beet grown by the gardeners. Omnibuses from tho Elsternwick Railway Station arrive at 9 and 11.15 a.m., and 4.15 and 5.21 p.m.; leave at 9.6 and 11.34 a.m., and 4.36 and 5.22 p.m.

For full particulars see plans and prospectuses, to be obtained from the principal auctioneers and estate agents, or at the offices of the Victorian Permanent Property Investment and Building Society, Collins- street east.

Ross died in 1904. His failed sugar beet mill, which had been known for many years as "Ross's Folly", was demolished in 1908. Rosstown was renamed to Carnegie in 1909.
