= Rosstown Railway Heritage Trail =

Rail trail in Victoria, Australia

The Rosstown Railway Heritage Trail is a rail trail covering the former Rosstown Railway line in Melbourne, Australia. Almost the entire length of the former private railway has been replaced by roads, except for one section of off-road multi-use path, located between Curraweena Road and Grange Road. The trail is marked by signs in various places. It is approximately 8.5 km in total length.

The off-road shared path between Grange Road and Curraweena Road intersects with the shared path that follows the Frankston Railway Line between Glen Huntly and Bentleigh Stations. The trail can also be used as part of a connection between the Djerring Trail in Oakleigh and Bay Trail in Elwood, which utilises suburban backstreets and the Elster Creek Trail.

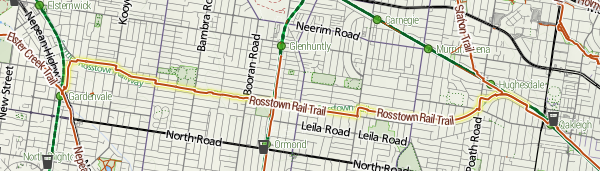
Map of the rail trail.
