= Bertram Cohen =

Australian cricketer (1892–1955)

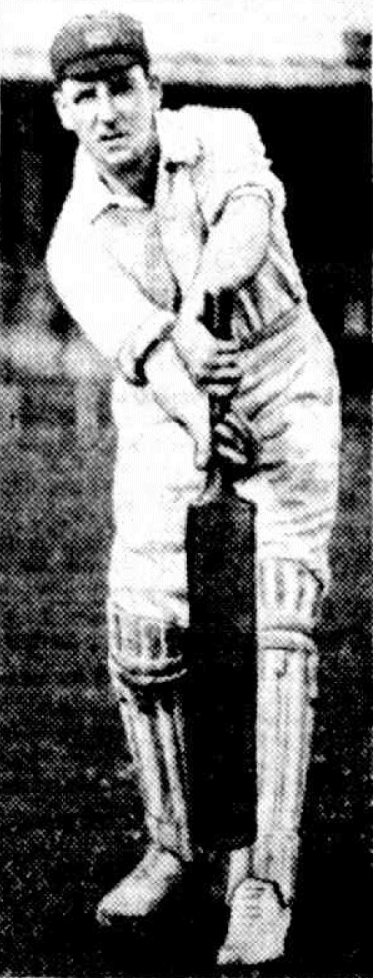

Personal information
- Born: 25 September 1892; London, England
- Died: 30 June 1955 (aged 62); North Caulfield, Victoria, Australia

Domestic team information
- Years: Team
- 1914–1934: Victoria
- Source: Cricinfo, 18 November 2015

Bertram Cohen (25 September 1892 – 30 June 1955) was an Australian cricketer. He played four first-class cricket matches for Victoria between 1914 and 1934. At club level he played for St Kilda.

== See also ==
- List of Victoria first-class cricketers
