= Planić =

- Language: Serbian or Croatian

Origin
- Language: Serbian or Croatian
- Origin: male name Plano or female name Plana
- Meaning: descendant of Plano or Plana

Planić is a Serbian family name derived from unattested male name Plano or female name Plana.

Notable people with Planić surname include:

- Bogdan Planić - (born 1992) a Serbian professional footballer
- Petar Planić - (born 1989) a Serbian football defender
- Stjepan Planić - (1900–1980) a Croatian architect
