= Tram roundabout =

Circular tramway junction

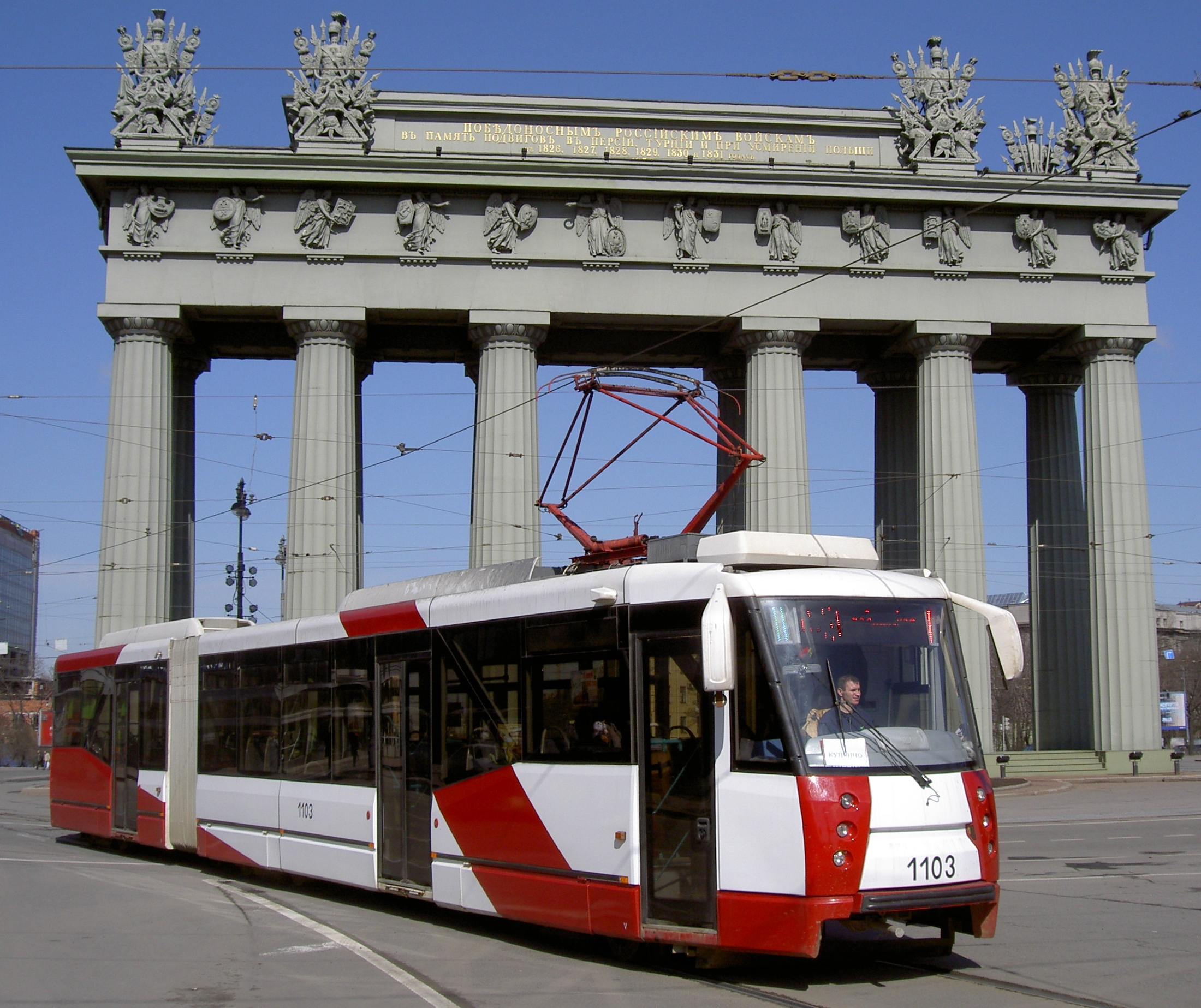
Tram exiting Moscow Triumphal Gate roundabout in St Petersburg

A tram roundabout or grand circle is a circular rail junction for trams in the shape of a roundabout. A tram roundabout is able to provide the equivalent any-to-any connection of a grand union, but with a simplified tramway track configuration using one-way traffic, fewer turnouts and reduction in level junctions, at the cost of slightly more space. Trams may continue as one-way traffic in an endless loop around the tram roundabout junction.

A circular roundabout design is often used to allowing passing around a centrally-placed monument, or fountain, or small park.

== Standard design ==
Standard tram roundabouts
Name	System	Ring track		In	Out	Thru	Stops	Notes	Geo
Hoofddorpplein	Amsterdam	180 m	590 ft	2	2				52.3513°N 4.85°E
Tropenmuseum	Amsterdam	195 m	640 ft	3	3				52.3633°N 4.9228°E
Slotermeerlaan	Amsterdam	212 m	696 ft	4	4		6	junction with Burgemeester Röellstraat	52.3757°N 4.819°E
Place Dumon/ Dumonplein	Brussels	242 m	794 ft	2	2		2		50.84°N 4.465°E
Bersarinplatz	Berlin	254 m	833 ft	3	3		4	stops off ring	52.5186°N 13.453°E
Romanplatz	Munich	137 m	449 ft	3	3		4	stops off ring, two tracks at one of the Ins	48.1555°N 11.5116°E
Moscow Triumphal Gate	St Petersburg	290 m	950 ft	2	2				59.8917°N 30.3195°E
Turgenev Square	St Petersburg	557 m	1,827 ft	2	2		2		59.9184°N 30.289°E
Lenina / Lunacharskogo	Yekaterinburg	188 m	617 ft	4	4				56.8402°N 60.6206°E
Moscow Highway	Ulyanovsk	230 m	750 ft	4	4				54.3064°N 48.3497°E
Tivoli Circle	New Orleans	283 m	928 ft	3	2				29.9433°N 90.0725°W
Kaiserplatz	Karlsruhe	245 m	804 ft	2	2	2		around Kaiser Wilhelm monument (Karlsruhe), with "Kombilösung" bypass tunnel underneath	49.0103°N 8.3889°E
Wolnośći Square in Katowice	Silesian	366 m	1,201 ft	2	2			near Katowice railway station	50.2598°N 19.0132°E
Mihaljevac	Zagreb	170 m	560 ft	2	2		3		45.8422°N 15.9746°E
Square of the Victims of Fascism	Zagreb	456 m	1,496 ft	3	3		2		45.81°N 15.9872°E
Będzin Rondo	Silesian	218 m	715 ft	4	4		8		50.3249°N 19.1243°E
Koszutka Słoneczna Pętla	Silesian	221 m	725 ft	2	2		4	one platform on loop	50.2736°N 19.0248°E

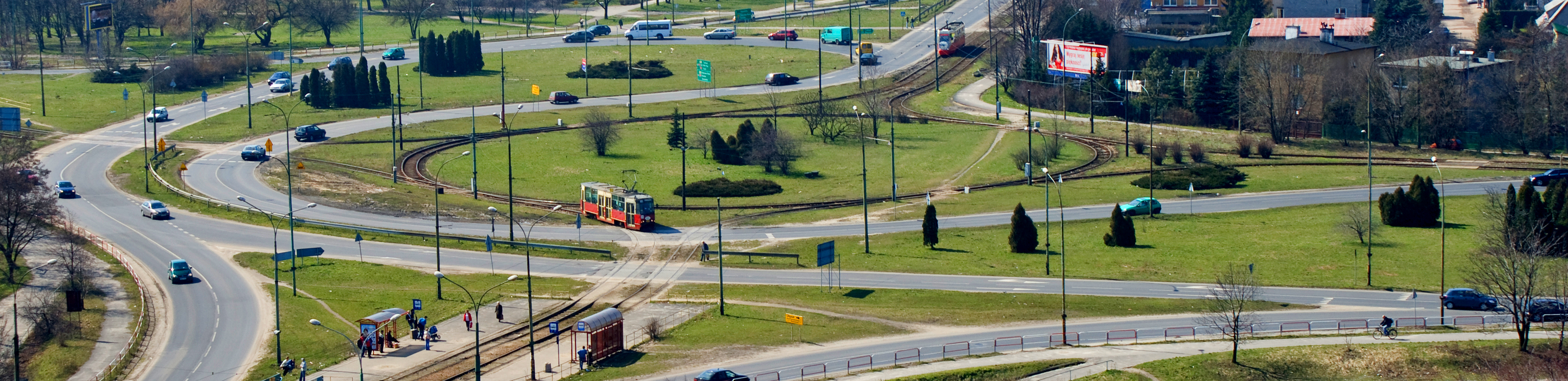
Four-way circular tram roundabout in Będzin, Poland, on the Silesian Interurbans system, often referred to as 'the kidney' due to the entire junction's rather unusual shape.

== Special variations ==
Special variations of tram roundabout
Name	System	Ring track		In	Out	Thru	Stops	Notes	Geo
Rond-Point du Meir/ Meirplein	Brussels	210 m	690 ft	2	2	1	3	with tram stop in middle	50.8327°N 4.3023°E
Barrière de Saint-Gilles/ Bareel van Sint-Gillis	Brussels	115 m	377 ft	3	3		4	overlapping tracks, stops off ring	50.8269°N 4.3446°E
Place de l'Altitude Cent/ Hoogte Honderd	Brussels	262 m	860 ft	2	2		2	around Saint Augustine Church, Vorst	50.8166°N 4.3368°E
Rond-point Winston Churchill/ Winston Churchillplein	Brussels	154 m	505 ft	2	2	2	8		50.8119°N 4.3539°E
Verboekhoven Square	Brussels	241 m	791 ft	4	4		2	over main line rail tracks	50.8714°N 4.3759°E
Maxmonument	Munich	255 m	837 ft	4	4	2	4	separation around the monument	48.1376°N 11.588°E
Alt-Köpenick	Berlin	916 m	3,000 ft	3	3		3	old town centre	52.4456°N 13.576°E
Hackescher Markt	Berlin	672 m	2,200 ft	3	3		3	around station, with sidings	52.523°N 13.4018°E
Basel SBB railway station	Basel	220 m	720 ft	4	4	4	6	station forecourt	47.5483°N 7.5903°E
Haarlemmermeer station	Amsterdam	195 m	640 ft	4	4	1	2	next to Electric tram museum line	52.3496°N 4.8575°E
Surinameplein	Amsterdam	170 m	560 ft	3	3	1	4		52.3584°N 4.8532°E
Hoofddorpplein	Amsterdam	180 m	590 ft	2	2				52.3584°N 4.8532°E
Paunsdorf-Nord	Leipzig	266 m	870 ft	3	3	1	5	operates clockwise	51.3606°N 12.47°E
Stortorvet	Oslo	256 m	840 ft	3	3	1	3		59.9128°N 10.7453°E
Pilestredet / Welhaven Gate	Oslo	904 m	2,966 ft	3	3		2	residential one-way	59.921°N 10.732°E
Chebzie Pętla / Rondo	Silesian	244 m	801 ft	4	4		5		50.3007°N 18.8824°E
Porta Maggiore	Rome	435 m	1,400 ft	5	4	2	6		41.8915°N 12.5151°E
Regina Margherita	Rome	145 m	476 ft	2	2	2	2		41.9111°N 12.509°E

== Former ==
On 8 September 1968, one week before closure of Liverpool Corporation Tramways, tram car 245 completed three complete laps of the St. Oswald Street tram roundabout whilst being filmed.
