= Square of the Victims of Fascism =

- Trg žrtava fašizma
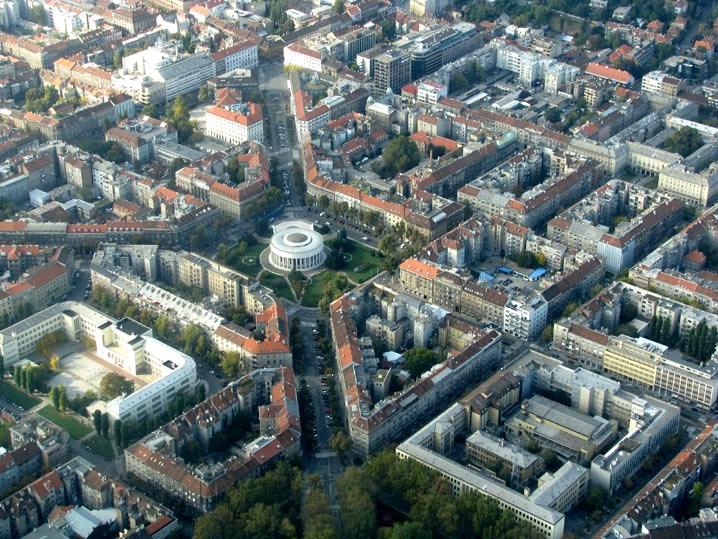
- Areal view of the square
- Location: Donji grad, Zagreb, Croatia
- Interactive map of Square of the Victims of Fascism
- Coordinates: 45.8100°N 15.9872°E

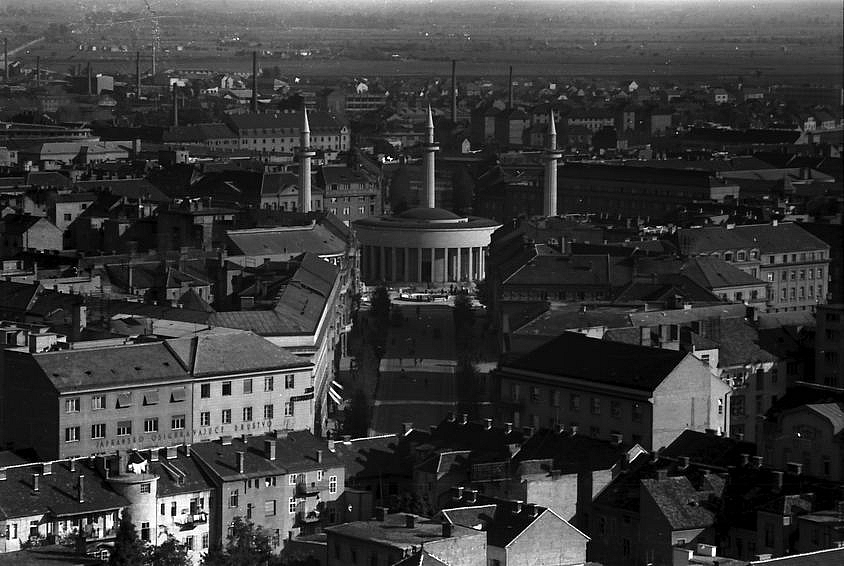
View of the Square from 1942, when Pavillon was briefly turned into a mosque. Photo taken from Zagreb Cathedral

Square of the Victims of Fascism (Croatian: Trg žrtava fašizma) is one of the central squares in Zagreb. It was designed in 1923 urban plan on the site of the former fairground that was east of Draškovića street as the new center of then new eastern part of the town that was deliberately and systematically built in the 1920s and 1930s.

Four streets lead directly to the center of the square; Rački street from the northwest, Višeslavova street from the southeast, Zvonimirova street from the east, and Dukljaninova street from the northeast.

== About ==
Square form of the square was achieved by four representative residential and partly commercial buildings. Car and tram traffic flows anti-clockwise with tram roundabout around the rim of the square. In the center of the square is the green area with a building called Meštrović Pavilion which has a circular layout with a colonnade around the rim and a low dome. Pavilion was built in 1938 following designs made by Ivan Meštrović. In 1941, the building was converted into a mosque. Three minarets and fountains designed by architect Stjepan Planić were erected at the Pavilion's entrance. The minarets were removed in 1948, and the building was converted in 1949 to the Museum of the Croatian Revolution (in World War II). At the beginning of the 1990s, the building was returned to the Croatian Association of Visual Artists and was restored to its original state in 2003.

On the north side of the square is the business-residential building made by architect Viktor Kovačić in 1922, while the entire south side of the square is enclosed by large five-storey residential-commercial block built in 1933 as a residential building for- the Croatian Academy of Sciences and Arts built by architects Edo Šen and Milovan Kovačević. Today, it is used as Student Dormitory of Ivan Meštrović, but it is currently closed for renovation.

Tram line that goes from Rački street and goes around the square to the Zvonimirova street was built in 1935.

== Former names ==
Being one of the most prominent squares in Zagreb its name was often changed in accordance to political circumstances of the time:

- x–1927 Trg N (Square N)
- 1927–1941 Trg Petra I. osloboditelja (Square of Peter I, the liberator)
- 1941–1942 Trg III (Square number III)
- 1942–1946 Trg bana Kulina (Square of Ban Kulin)
- 1946–1990 Trg žrtava fašizma (Square of the Victims of Fascism)
- 1990–2000 Trg hrvatskih velikana (Croatian Nobles Square)
- 2001–present Trg žrtava fašizma (Square of the Victims of Fascism)

== Literature ==
- Atlas of Zagreb (M-Ž). "LZMK", Zagreb 2006, p. 434.-436.
- http://www.matica.hr/vijenac/174/Trg%20u%20vje%C4%8Dnom%20zagrljaju%20politike/
