= Grand circle =

Grand circle may refer to:

- The Grand Circle, a series of national parks in the American Southwest
- Tram roundabout, a circular rail junction also called a grand circle
- Grand circle, a type of theater seating
