= Tina Gverović =

Croatian artist

- Born: 1975 (age 50–51); Dubrovnik, Croatia
- Occupation: Conceptual artist
- Notable work: Posjeta (2006)

Tina Gverović (born 1975) is a Croatian visual artist whose work was exhibited at the Belgrade Museum of Contemporary Art, the Dubrovnik Museum of Modern Art, the Viennese Raum mit Licht Gallery, the Busan Biennale and Tate Modern.

For her 2006 exhibition Posjeta in the Miroslav Kraljević Gallery, Gverović won the annual Radoslav Putar Award.

== Career ==
A Dubrovnik native, her alma mater includes the Academy of Fine Arts in Zagreb, the Jan van Eyck Academy in Maastricht and doctoral studies at the Middlesex University in London.

Her artistic opus explores "space, territory and identity" and the aforementioned's ties to the imagination through an eclectic artistic medium, which incorporates installation, drawing, painting, sound, text and video. The central themes of her research are politics and poetics, questioning "cultural and national identity, migration, forms of memorialising, belonging, conflict and loss."

Her 2006 installation Posjeta (The Visit) and its accompanying book designed by Leeds-born multimedia artist Ben Cain received critical acclaim and the prestigious Radoslav Putar Award for Outstanding Artistic Achievement. A collaboration between the Miroslav Kraljević gallery and the Zagreb Institute for Contemporary Art, the work was valorised by film producer and writer Boris Greiner.

In 2017, Gverović represented Croatia at the Venice Biennale alongside Marko Tadić with the conceptual work Fantomske razmjene: more ljudi. This professional engagement earned her a nomination for the Art Prize in Zurich.

Her work, based between Dubrovnik and London, is regularly exhibited nationally and internationally. Her exhibitions have been featured at the Suzhou Biennial in China, the WKV Stuttgart in Germany, the Belgrade Museum of Contemporary Art in Serbia and the Busan Biennial in South Korea. She has also prominently contributed to the artistic programs of Tate Modern and Tate Britain in London, as well as the Museum of Modern Art in her hometown.

She has taught classes at the Slade School of Arts, the Dutch Art Institute Roaming Academy, and Fine Arts Academy in Zagreb. She is also the co-director of the artistic initiative Tkivo.

== See also ==
- Josip Šurlin
