= Josip Šurlin =

Croatian artist

- Born: 1993 (age 32–33); Split, Croatia
- Occupation: Conceptual artist
- Notable work: Premijera 48 (2016); Gilles Blatta i njegovi tajni prolazi (2017); Recounting End Times / SN Tension (2023)

Josip Šurlin (born 1993 in Split) is a Croatian conceptual artist. A painter by vocation, his opus encompasses an eclectic range of artistic media, notably installation and text, and is noted for exploring a vast array of themes focused on the "dialectic between the individual and society."

== Career ==
Šurlin studied at the Academy of Fine Arts in the class of Gorki Žuvela, and graduated in 2017 under the mentorship of Viktor Popović. Speaking of his artistic influences in 2023, he referred to the "great importance for (his) personal (...) growth" of both respective professors, but singled out the former as the "most important figure of closure in (his) professional development."

Making his debut in 2014 alongside Andrea Civadelić, Mia Madir, Jelena Perišić, Ivana Kevo and Bruna Carev with a collaborative effort at the international graphic design expo Szymborska in Olsztyn, Poland, his first solo exhibition came a year later with the first piece of the Progress cycle at the City Museum in Split. 2015 also saw him as a contributor to the first Student Biennale at the Waldinger Gallery in Osijek, where he won critical praise and an honourable mention award.

According to Dora Derado, Šurlin's 2016 secession-based project Premijera 48 (Premier 48), conceptually capturing "the modern man in his constant attempt to keep up with the urban world (...) inadvertently dissipating himself", harkens back to the poetics of Joseph Beuys and Eva Hesse. Presented at the lodge of the Porta Aurea Cinematheque in Split, the concept, mirrored in the transformation of space initiated by interplay of aluminum and rubber, "fuses sculpture and painting."

Curator Božo Kesić proposes the "dialectic between the individual and society" as the red thread of the ontological themes probed in Šurlin's work. An evident example for such claim would be his 2017 minimalist diptych Giles Blatta i njegovi tajni prolazi (Giles Blatta and his Secret Passages), premiered in the Gallery of Fine Arts, Split. The work is a spatial and sonorous installation based on a theoretical concept of the individual powerless in the face of everyday life reflected in the fictional figure of Giles Blatta who willingly goes in exile to noncomformingly escape "the second class life of the marginalised individual." Kesić also links the sentiments expressed by the title character from Šurlin's "sensible" repertoire to Kafka's Metamorphosis. In 2017, Šurlin also contributed to the collective effort Rad, tekst, kontekst at the Old Town Hall in Split.

In 2019, he co-conceived the project Forms of Life alongside Jan Tomažin at the Slovene Galerija Ravno. At the same exhibition, he also presented his work Ozymandias, which was first displayed at the 13th Triennial of Croatian Sculpture earlier that year.

Inspired by Freud's Nachträglichkeit concept, his 2021 exhibition Afterwardness explores the nature of traumatic experience and its retroactive actualization. Šurlin returned to exhibit at the city's Youth Centre in 2023 with Taking Measures, a multimedia project co-created with Zagreb-based artist Miran Blažek, focused on space as a concept not solely defined by physical categories.

In 2022, Šurlin exhibited at the cult Ivan Galić Gallery in Split, the Julije Knifer Gallery in Osijek and the Vladimir Nazor Gallery in Zagreb. Akin to Giles Blatta, the complex panopticon of seven works created between 2018 and 2021 Post Residuum addresses escapism from the materialistic paradigms that followed urbanisation, and was acclaimed for its "inventive and subtle social commentary on the lability of today's life."

In 2023, Šurlin was nominated for the prestigious Radoslav Putar Award for Outstanding Artistic Achievement for his works Recounting End Times and SN Tension, presented at Salon Galić.

Since 2018, Šurlin is a member of the Croatian Association of Visual Artists in Split.

Šurlin assists at the department of painting in the Academy of Fine Arts, University of Split.

=== Artistry and influences ===
Much of Šurlin's artistic practice places its foundation on the theoretical aspects of the work. His influences include Christian Boltanski, Yi-Fu Tuan, Sigmund Freud, Bertrand Russell, Hal Foster and the poets T. S. Eliot, Ezra Pound and Hart Crane. He has also expressed admiration for his late mentor, Gorki Žuvela, stating that "the memory of professor Žuvela is a reminder of the Ancient Greek virtue of sophrosyne – reason, temperance and purity of thought."
