= Chaussée d'Alsemberg =

Thoroughfare in Brussels, Belgium

Chaussée d'Alsemberg (French); Alsembergsesteenweg (Dutch)
- Alsembergse Steenweg (Dutch)
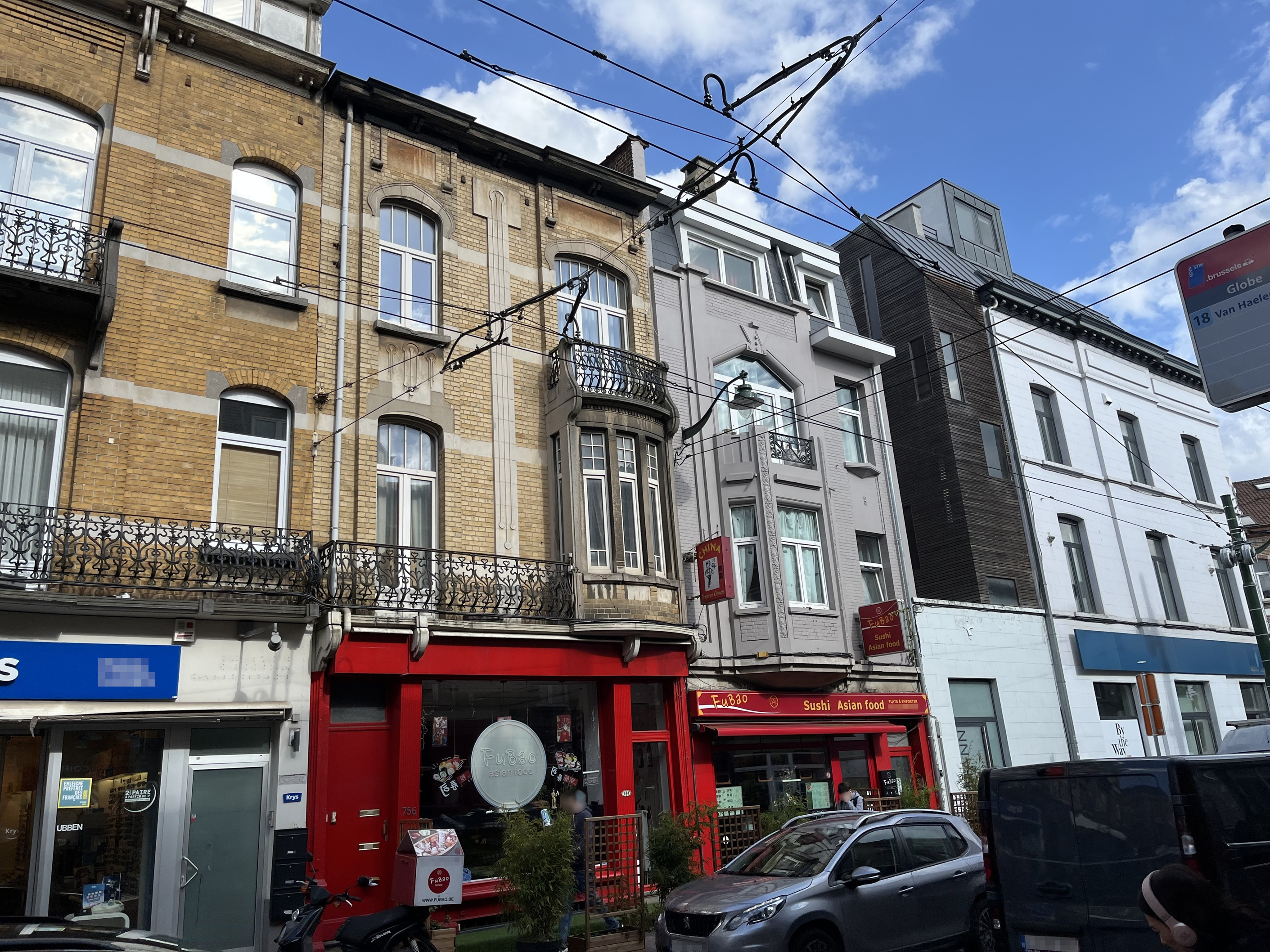
- The Chaussée d'Alsemberg / Alsembergsesteenweg in Uccle

- Location within Brussels Location within Belgium
- Namesake: Alsemberg
- Type: Chaussee
- Location: Brussels-Capital Region, Flemish Brabant and Walloon Brabant, Belgium
- Coordinates: 50°47′23″N 4°19′53″E

Construction
- Commissioned: 9 May 1726
- Completion: 1740

Other
- Designer: Adrien De Bruijn

The Chaussée d'Alsemberg (French, pronounced [ʃo.se d‿al.sɛm.bɛʁɡ]) or Alsembergsesteenweg (Dutch, pronounced [ˈɑl.səm.bɛr(ə)x.səˌsteːn.ʋɛx]) is a major north–south road in Belgium, forming part of the N235. It runs from the Barrière de Saint-Gilles/Bareel van Sint-Gillis in the Brussels municipality of Saint-Gilles to the town of Braine-l'Alleud (Wallonia), covering almost 5.5 kilometres (3.4 mi) within the Brussels-Capital Region. Along its route, it passes through the municipalities of Forest, Uccle, Drogenbos, Linkebeek, Beersel and Alsemberg.

Until nos. 139 and 156, the road lies on the territory of Saint-Gilles. Within Forest, where only a short section of the road is located, it borders the Altitude Cent/Hoogte Honderd area to the west and Berkendael/Berkendaal to the east. After this, the street enters Uccle, crosses the N261 at Globe, then continues southwards until Calevoet/Kalevoet. Beyond the Brussels Region, it continues towards the south-east through Linkebeek and Beersel before reaching Alsemberg, where it changes its name to become the Eigenbrakelsesteenweg until the regional border. In Braine-l'Alleud, it becomes the Chaussée d'Alsemberg again.

The Chaussée d'Alsemberg has long been an important transport and commercial axis. Since the 19th century, it has been lined with residential buildings, shops and workshops, while public transport, including trams, has reinforced its role as a link between central Brussels and the southern periphery.

== History ==
The Chaussée d'Alsemberg has its origins as a rural route. On the map of Jacques Van Deventer, it already appears as a long, winding country road running southwards from the Halle Gate. In the early 18th century, the road was formally laid out following a decision of the Finance Council on 9 May 1726. The surveyor Adrien De Bruijn designed the new road without following the existing path network, instead tracing a straight line across meadows largely owned by Forest Abbey. By September 1729, the road reached Calevoet/Kalevoet, and in 1740, it was extended to Alsemberg.

A 1766 map shows the Chaussée d'Alsemberg originally forming a continuous axis with what is now the Chaussée de Waterloo/Waterloosesteenweg between the Halle Gate and the Barrière de Saint-Gilles/Bareel van Sint-Gillis (lit. 'Barrier of Saint Giles', named after the tollgate that stood there). It is believed that during the Dutch period, the road was extended further south to Braine-l'Alleud. From 1830 onwards, it was designated as a provincial road. The Vandermaelen maps of 1837 still depicted the road without buildings, while mid-19th-century plans by Victor Besme show the first scattered constructions. The oldest surviving building permits date from 1853, 1862 and 1863.

The paving of the road in 1870 and the installation of a sewer system in 1872 triggered rapid urbanisation. What had been a rural axis lined with farms and taverns gradually transformed into a residential and commercial thoroughfare. From the 1860s onwards, bourgeois houses in neoclassical style appeared, and after 1895, the presence of an electric tram line linking Brussels-South railway station with the Globe stop encouraged intensive construction. Many shopfronts were remodelled during the commercial boom between 1940 and 1970, although retail activity declined in later decades.

During the interwar period, the last vacant plots were developed, mainly with four-storey apartment blocks influenced by modernist architecture. By the late 1930s, the street had largely acquired its current urban form.

== Notable buildings ==
The Chaussée d'Alsemberg is home to many buildings in neoclassical, Art Deco, eclectic and modernist styles. Some examples include:

- No. 203–207: Neoclassical (1895) and neo-Flemish Renaissance (1903), former orphanage of Forest
- No. 283–285: Memorial Résidence (1934), an Art Deco apartment building by Gaston Heerebout, decorated with commemorative relief by Jean-Michel Bertrand
- No. 356–356a: Résidence Molière (1929), an Art Deco apartment building by Félicien Rogge
- No. 621: Au Vieux Spijtigen Duivel, historic café
- No. 1046: Kasteel Rondenbos (1909), an eclectic château commissioned by the Antwerp timber merchant Frans Bosquet
- No. 1057–1059c: Hoeve 't Hoogveld, 19th-century farmhouse
- No. 1143–1147: Dwersboskasteel (1870), a neotraditional château commissioned by Theodoor De Roest d'Alkemade
- No. 1131: Chapel of St. Agnes (1963), a modernist chapel by Léon De Keyser, commissioned by the Archdiocese of Mechelen–Brussels and in use as a Korean Mission Church since 1990
- No. 1208: Bait-ul-Mujeeb Mosque (2021), Ahmadiyya mosque
- No. 1299: La Roseraie, cultural centre
- No. 1367: Nursery school of the Lycée français Jean Monnet de Bruxelles
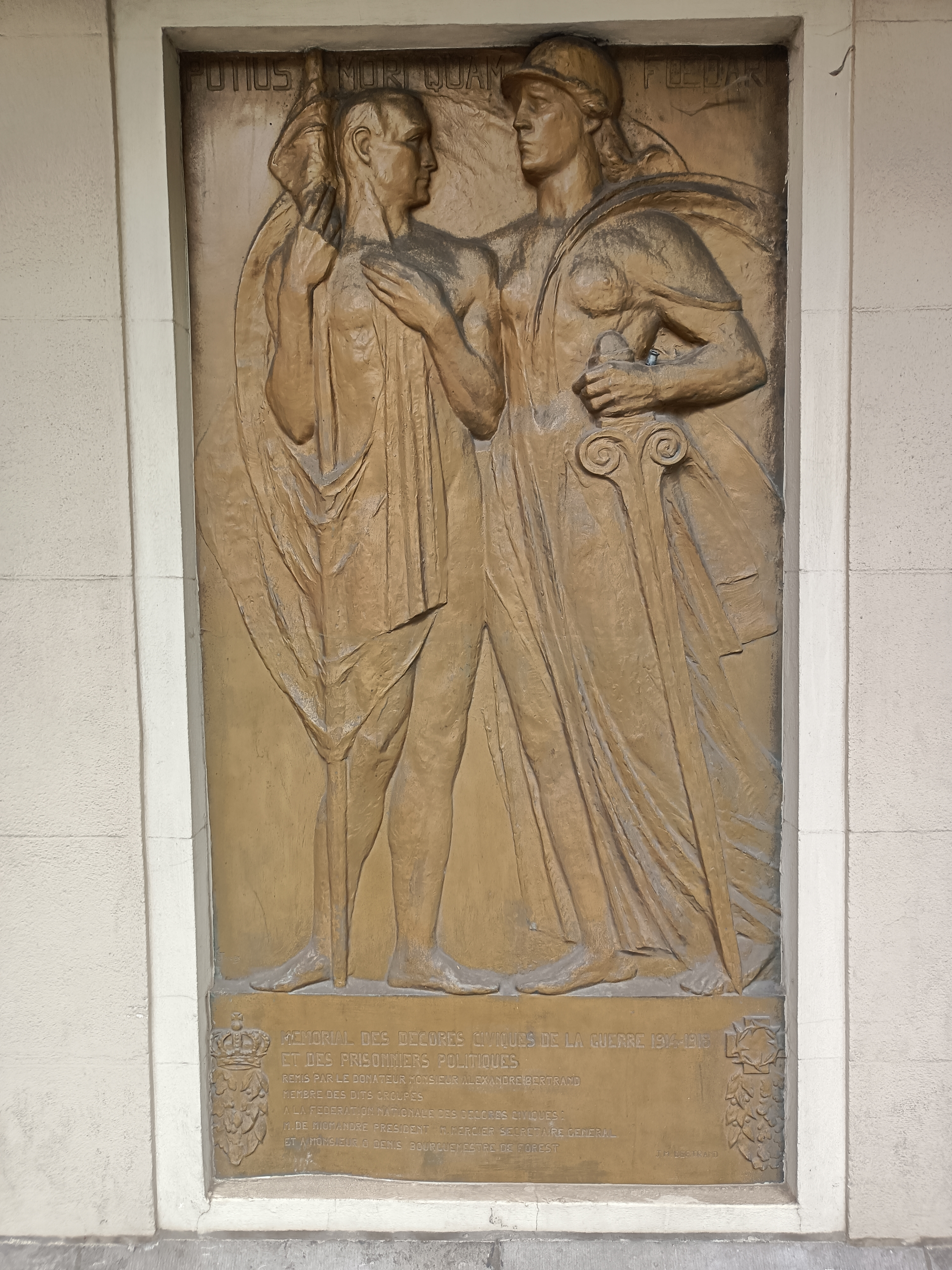
Relief of the Memorial Résidence (Heerebout, 1934)

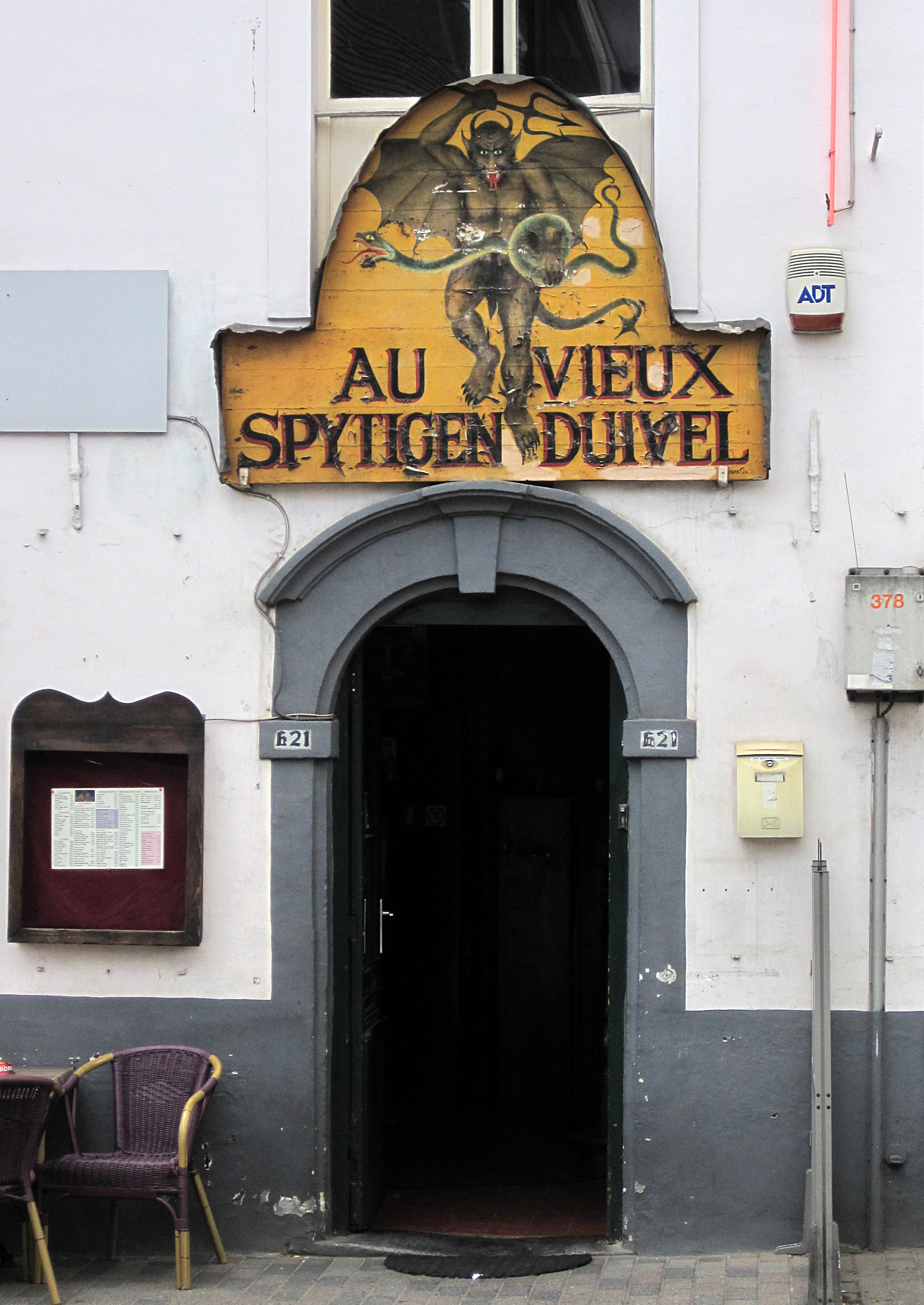
Entrance of the Au Vieux Spijtigen Duivel

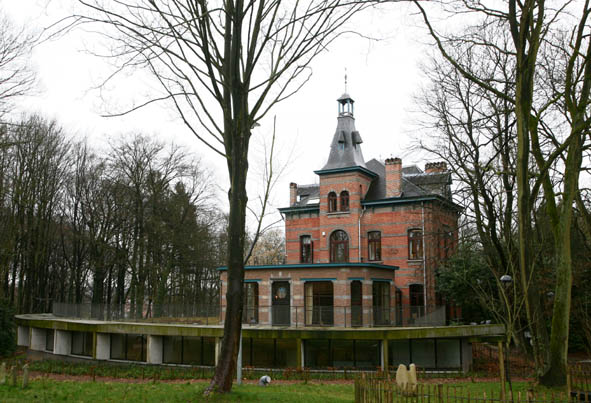
Kasteel Rondenbos (1909)

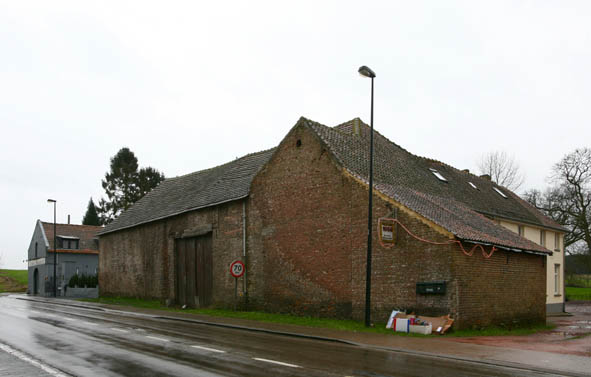
Hoeve 't Hoogveld

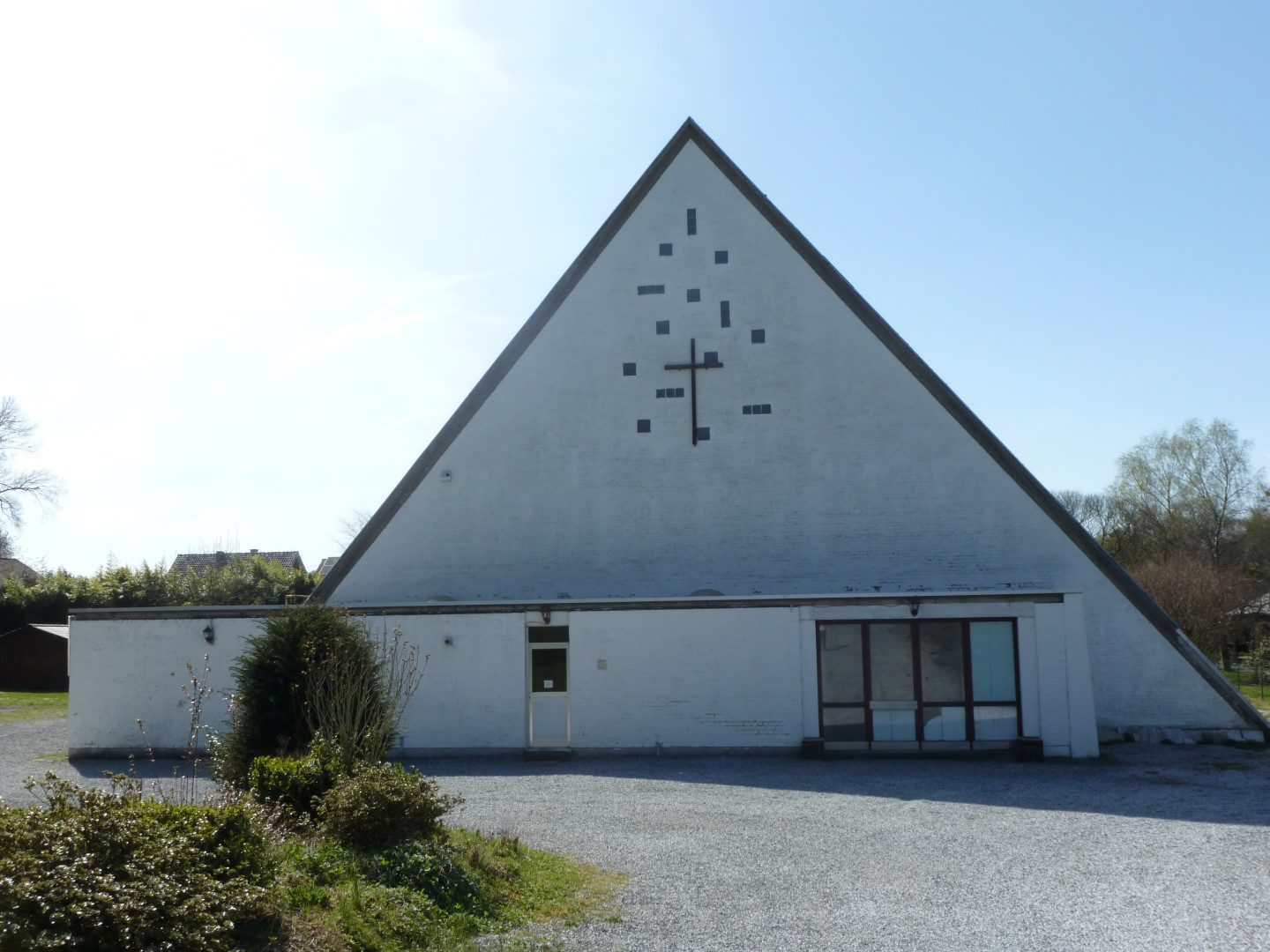
Chapel of St. Agnes (De Keyser, 1963)

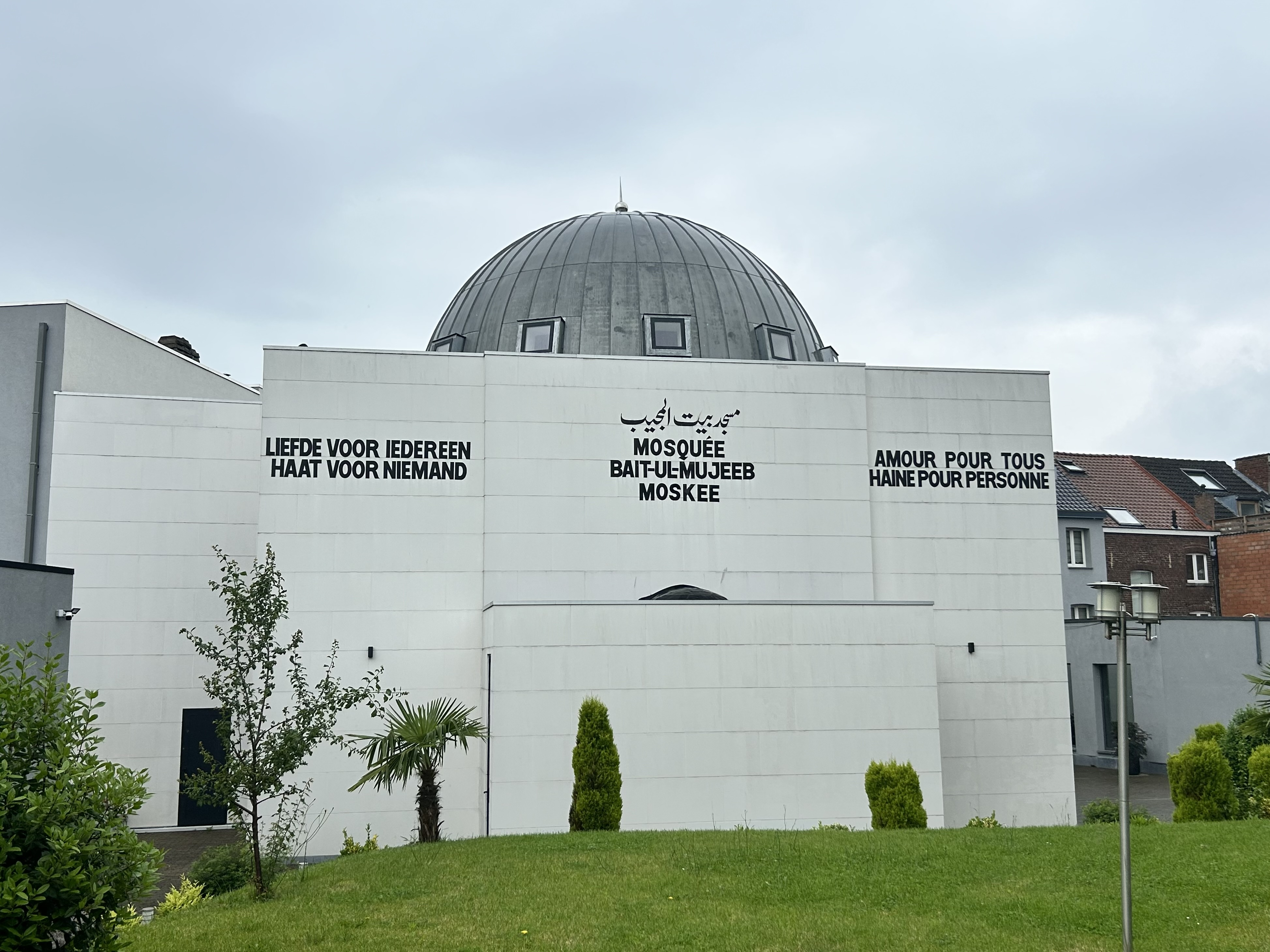
Bait-ul-Mujeeb Mosque (2021)

== See also ==
- List of streets in Brussels
- History of Brussels
- Belgium in the long nineteenth century
