= Altitude Cent =

Neighbourhood in Brussels, Belgium

Altitude Cent: Altitude Cent (French); Hoogte Honderd (Dutch); Altitude 100 (French); Hoogte 100 (Dutch)
- Neighbourhood
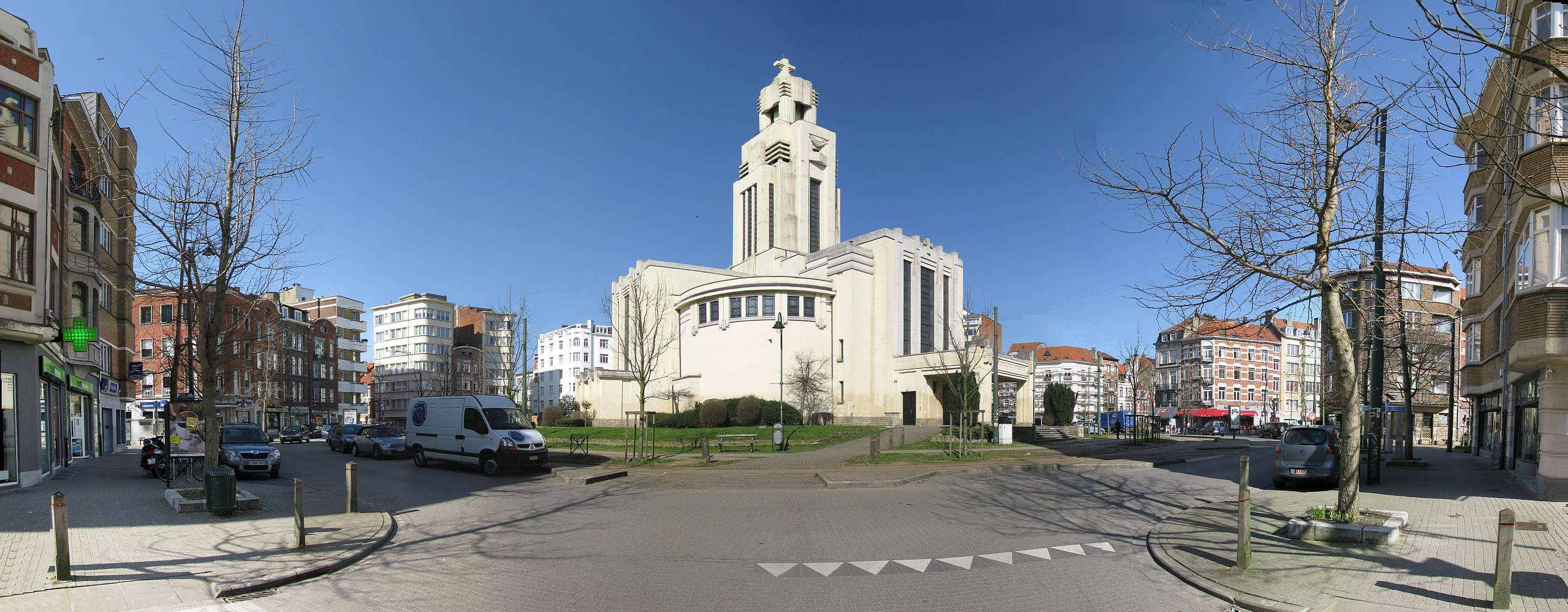
- Panorama of the Place de l'Altitude Cent/Hoogte Honderdplein with the Church of St. Augustine.

- Location within Brussels Altitude Cent (Belgium)
- Coordinates: 50°49′1″N 4°20′13″E
- Country: Belgium
- Region: Brussels-Capital Region
- Arrondissement: Brussels-Capital
- Municipality: Forest
- Urbanisation: 4 May 1901
- Named for: Altitude
- Time zone: UTC+1 (CET)
  - Summer (DST): UTC+2 (CEST)
- Postal code: 1190
- Area codes: 02

The Altitude Cent (French, pronounced [altitydə sə]) or Hoogte Honderd (Dutch, pronounced [ˈhoxtə ˈhɔndərt]), also known as the Altitude 100 or Hoogte 100, meaning "Height One Hundred", is a district of Forest, a municipality of Brussels, Belgium. Located east of Duden Park, it occupies the summit of the Flotsenberg, the municipality's highest point, at an elevation of around 100 metres (330 ft) above sea level.

Mostly developed in the early to mid-20th century, it combines eclectic, Art Nouveau and Art Deco houses with apartment blocks from the 1930s and later post-World War II additions. At its centre stands the circular Place de l'Altitude Cent/Hoogte Honderdplein, a roundabout around the Church of St. Augustine, from which eight of the district's major arteries radiate in a star-shaped plan. The district is bordered by Saint-Gilles to the north and Uccle and Ixelles to the east. It is served by the tram stop Altitude Cent/Hoogte Honderd on line 18.

== History ==
=== Rural beginnings ===
The plateau around the Altitude Cent was originally part of the Heegde, an outlying section of the Sonian Forest belonging to Forest Abbey. Among its woods were the Galgeheyde Bosch and the Galge Veld. From the 13th century, the Benedictine nuns gradually cleared the slopes. An abbey farm, the Hof te Spilotsenberg or Hoff van Vorst, was established, later called Splotsberghe in the 14th century and Flotsenberghe in the 16th century. Tenants cultivated grain, raised sheep, and supplied timber for nearby gallows and breaking wheels. The Brussels court held sessions at the Galge Veldt from 1233, and executions, including that of the Lutheran Lambrecht Thorn in 1528, took place there.

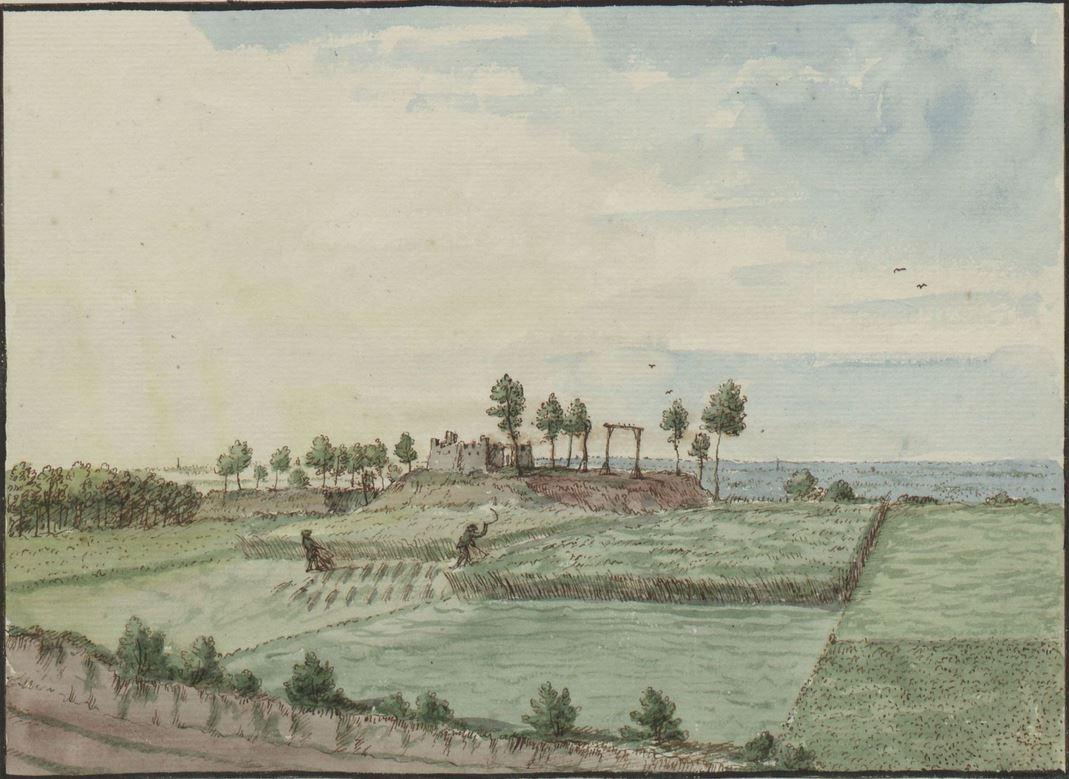
The Flotsenberg c. 1700 by Hendrik van Wel

Until the late 17th century, the Altitude Cent was sparsely populated. The construction of the Chaussée de Forest/Vorstsesteenweg and the Chaussée d'Alsemberg/Alsembergsesteenweg gradually increased the population. In 1786, there were 740 inhabitants, nearly doubling by 1850, while the area remained largely rural.

=== Urbanisation ===
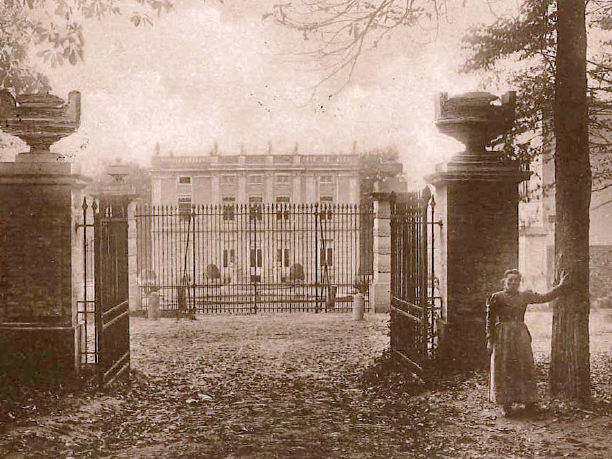
Château Zaman, before 1880, from the current intersection of the Avenue du Domaine/Domeinlaan and the Avenue Minerve/Minervalaan

Joseph-Emmanuel Zaman, an industrialist and politician, owned much of the land in the area. He industrialised porphyry paving production, built a private railway for transport, supplied paving for Brussels streets, and invested in metal and sugar industries. By 1874, his estate in Forest exceeded 50 hectares (120 acres). However, after losing most of his fortune in the Panic of 1884, parts of his land were sold to the industrialist Jules Vimenet and the Société anonyme des Villas de Forest.

Founded in 1887 with capital mainly from Zaman's lands, the Société aimed to prepare land for construction, lay out roads, and facilitate housing. In 1899, Alexandre Bertrand and associates acquired all shares and began rapidly preparing land for the St. Augustine neighbourhood. The first design plan was drawn in November 1899, revised multiple times, and approved by municipal councils in 1900–01, with the final street layout confirmed through a royal decree issued on 4 May 1901. The Société funded groundworks, pavements, tree planting, and sewerage, while the municipality provided utilities and partially refunded building taxes.

In parallel, in 1875, the architect and urbanist Victor Besme proposed the creation of Forest Park on the Galgeheyde, with funding by King Leopold II. Designed by Besme and revised by the French landscape architect Elie Lainé in 1890, the 13-hectare (32-acre) park opened in 1882 as the Parc de Saint-Gilles/Park van Sint-Gillis ("Saint-Gilles Park") or Parc du Midi/Zuidpark ("South Park"), and received its current name in 1913. The park's creation, connection to the Bois de la Cambre/Ter Kamerenbos, and the 1895 electric tramway between the South Station and Globe, encouraged development of the Berkendael and Altitude Cent districts.

Simultaneously, Bertrand initiated the construction of a temporary chapel and presbytery on the central square, designed by the architect Edouard Ramaekers in neo-Gothic style. The chapel's cornerstone was laid in May 1900 and inaugurated on 22 October 1900. A year later, Leopold II formalised the new parish, with Bertrand as chairman, and in 1902, the Société donated the chapel, presbytery, and land to the parish. The chapel no longer exists, but the presbytery remains at 12, avenue Saint-Augustin/Sint-Augustinuslaan. The new parish quickly attracted residents, and from 1900, Bertrand began selling plots and processing building applications. Between 1890 and 1910, the population quadrupled from 5,885 to 24,228, due to the municipality's location, transport links, affordable building plots, sanitation works, and low taxes.

Between 1902 and 1903, the first phase of construction began in the area around the Avenue Saint-Augustin amid tensions between the Belgian state, the municipality of Forest, and the Société, over approval of the development plan. A number of private buyers submitted building applications, mostly for single-family homes, while some invested in rental properties. Architects such as Edouard Ramaekers, Léon Janlet, Alphonse Boelens and Camille Damman designed buildings in neo-Gothic, eclectic and Art Nouveau styles. Alexandre Bertrand acted as developer, commissioning several projects and selling plots to private investors. In 1904, the Institut Sainte-Ursule, designed by Damman, was constructed as a girls' boarding school on the Avenue des Armures/Wapenrustinglaan. By 1909, construction had accelerated on the Avenue Saint-Augustin and new streets, such as the Avenue Oscar Van Goidtsnoven/Oscar Van Goidtsnovenlaan, with row houses, shops, and corner apartment buildings, appearing throughout the neighbourhood.

In December 1908, the Belgian state and the municipality of Forest introduced the Projet des Parcs, aiming to beautify the area and connect it to Duden Park, including new road layouts, widened streets, tree plantings, and a belvedere, which was later replaced by a panoramic terrace and orientation table. The plan required modifications to Bertrand's 1901 layout and was approved by the municipal council in July 1911, with a royal decree following on 8 February 1912. Following approval, expropriations began, including the removal of social housing on the Avenue Besme/Besmelaan. However, the outbreak of the First World War in 1914 abruptly halted construction, which only resumed in the 1920s.

== Sights ==
- The Church of St. Augustine, a Catholic church designed in Art Deco style and built in 1932–1935.
- Duden Park, a public park that includes the Joseph Marien Stadium, home of the football club Royale Union Saint-Gilloise.
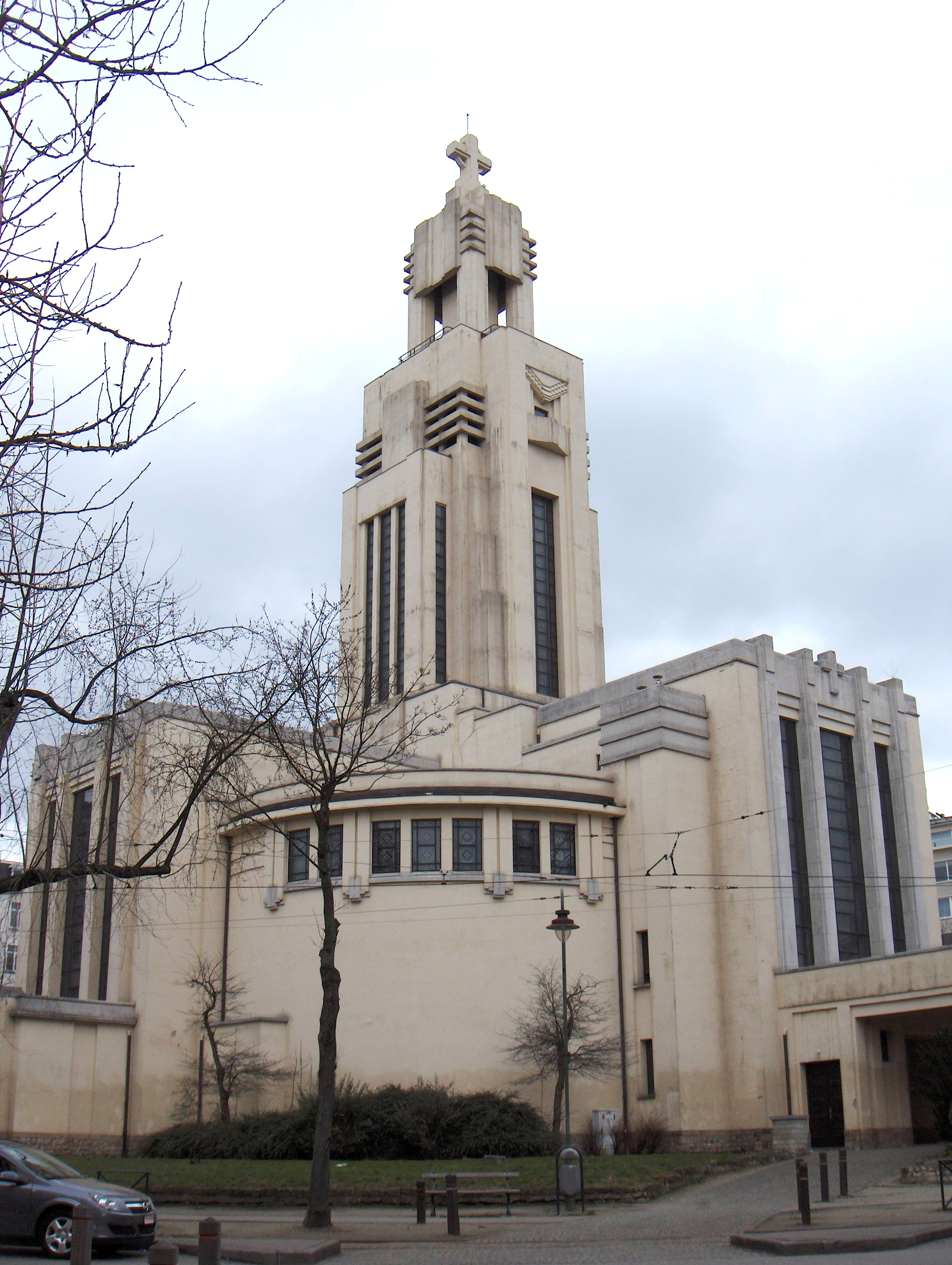
Church of St. Augustine

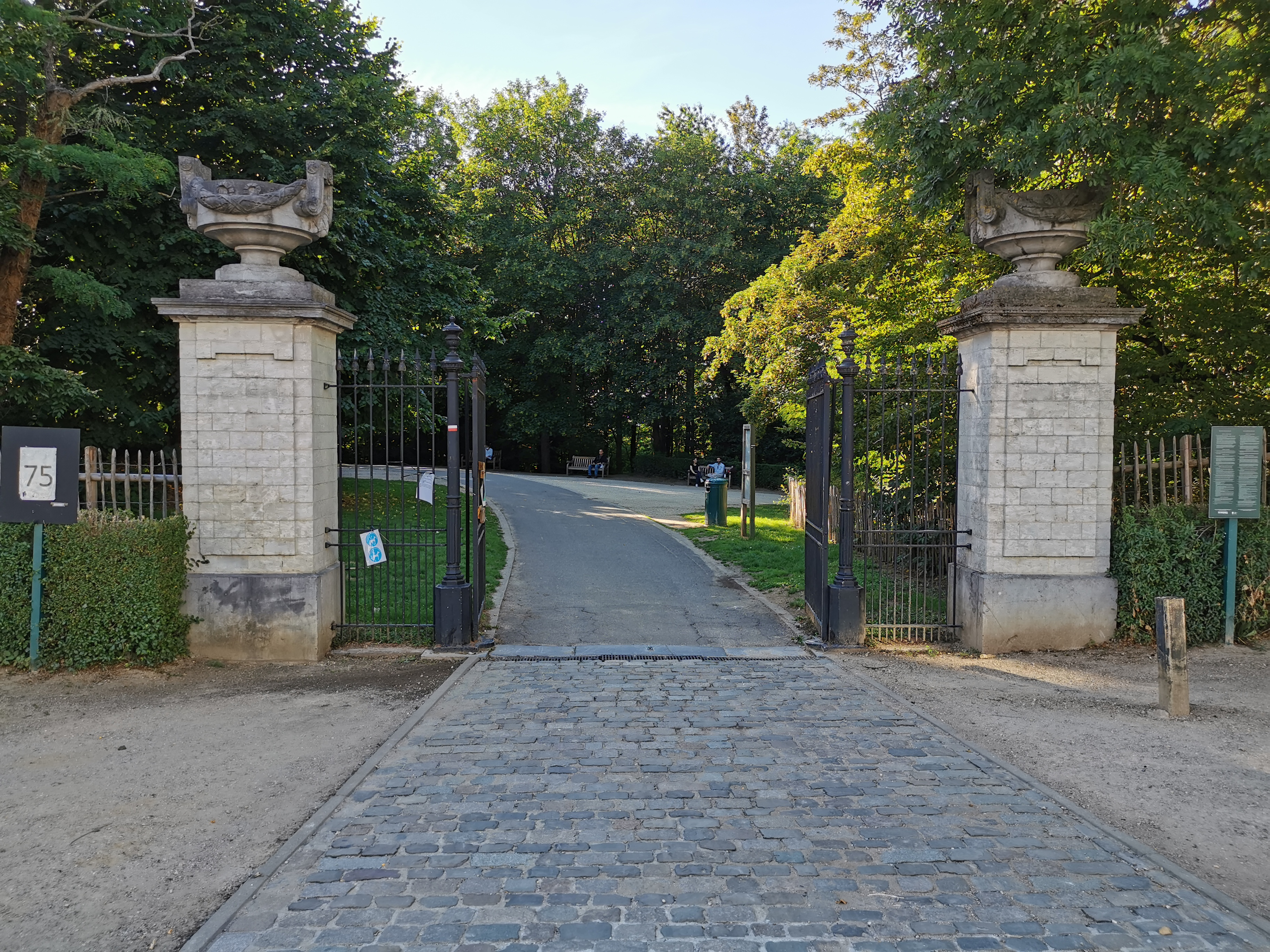
Entrance of Duden Park

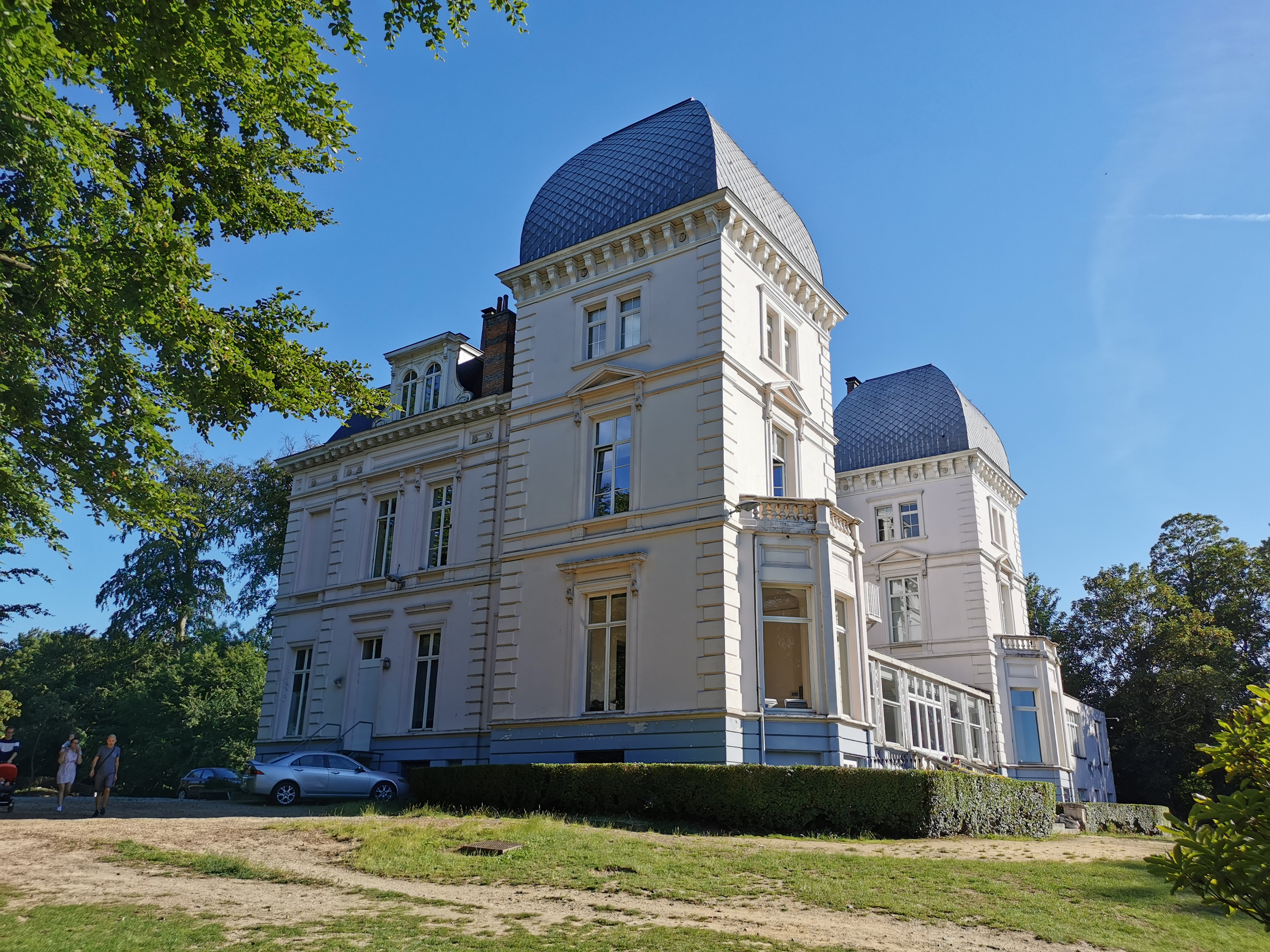
Château Duden

== See also ==
- Neighbourhoods in Brussels
- History of Brussels
- Belgium in the long nineteenth century
