= Balaclava Junction =

Heritage-listed tram junction in Melbourne, Victoria, Australia

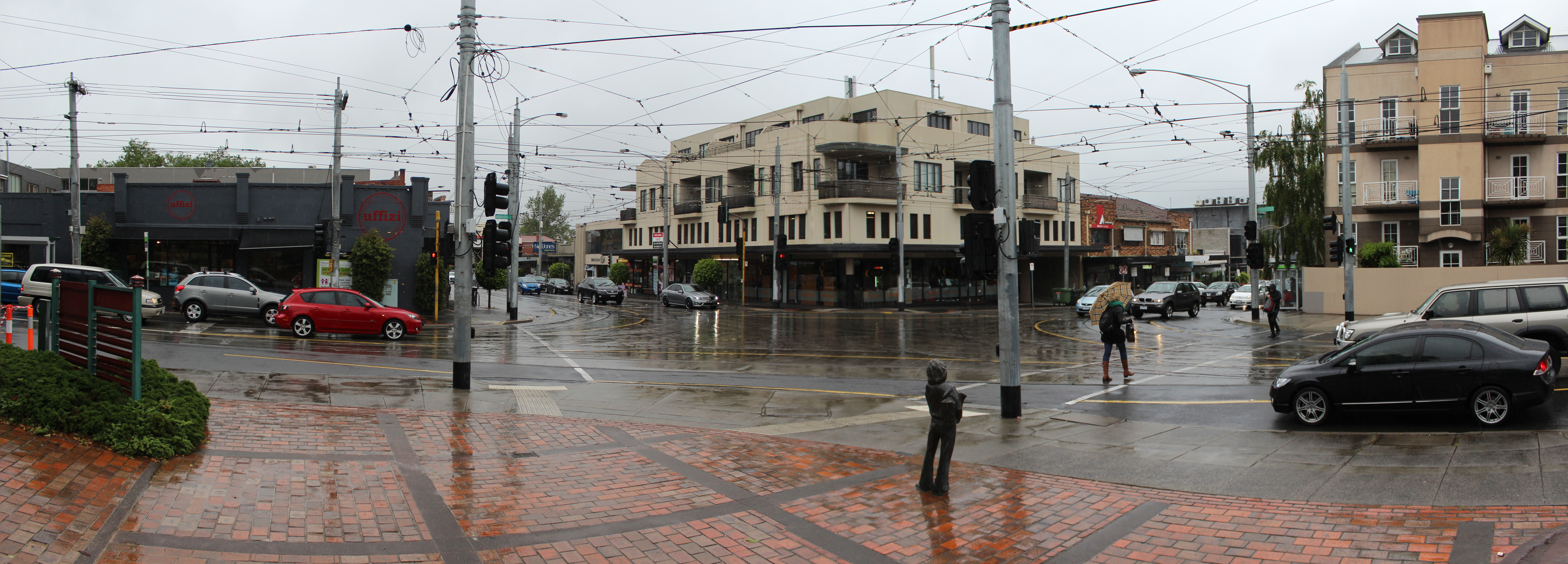
- Panorama of Balaclava Junction, 2013

General information
- Other names: Grand Union Tramway Junction
- Location: Corner Balaclava and Hawthorn roads, Caulfield North, City of Glen Eira, Melbourne, Victoria; Australia
- Coordinates: 37°52′22″S 145°01′29″E
- System: Melbourne tram network
- Owner: Prahran & Malvern Tramways Trust (1913–1919); Melbourne & Metropolitan Tramways Board (1919–1983); VicTrack (since 1997)
- Operator: P&MTT (1913–1919); M&MTB (1919–1983); Yarra Trams (since 1998)
- Transit authority: Victorian Department of Transport and Planning
- Lines: :

History
- Opened: November 1913; 113 years ago
- B class tram on Route 64 at the junction, in 2023

Victorian Heritage Register
- Official name: Grand Union Tramway Junction
- Type: Registered place
- Designated: 15 February 2007
- Reference no.: VHR H0148
- Heritage overlay no.: HO227
- Category: Transport - Tramways

Register of the National Estate
- Official name: Balaclava Junction
- Type: Defunct register
- Designated: undated
- Reference no.: 18785
Location
- Location of the junction in Greater Metropolitan Melbourne

The Balaclava Junction, officially the Grand Union Tramway Junction, is a complex tram track intersection and the only extant grand union junction in Australia. Part of the Melbourne tram network, trams can go in all directions from all directions. It is the only surviving example of a grand union in the Southern Hemisphere. The main elements are the overhead wire system and tracks which are all later replacements.

The junction is located at the intersection of Balaclava and Hawthorn roads in Caulfield North, in the City of Glen Eira, in the inner eastern suburbs of Melbourne, in Victoria, Australia. Built in 1913 on the traditional lands of the Wurundjeri people, the junction was added to the Victorian Heritage Register on 15 February 2007 in recognition of its historical and architectural significance; and was also added to non-statutory lists by the Victorian branch of the National Trust on 4 June 2001 and the now defunct Register of the National Estate on an unknown date.

== History ==
In the early years of the twentieth century the cable tram network of inner Melbourne, which had been built in the 1880s, was augmented by an electric tram network built by municipal tramways trusts in the various expanding suburbs. The Prahran & Malvern Tramways Trust (P&MTT) was the first municipal electric tramway in Melbourne; established by two municipal councils (through act of parliament in 1907). Its tramways spread through seven municipalities between 1910 and 1920. The P&MTT became the largest independent electric tram network in the suburbs, creating almost all of the system in the south east suburbs that exists today. The Melbourne & Metropolitan Tramways Board took over the cable tramways in 1919, and all the municipal electric tramways in 1920.

The PM&TT opened a double track tram route from Dandenong Road, Malvern via Hawthorn and Balaclava Roads, to St. Kilda Beach on 12 April 1913. Later that year, on 13 November, the Caulfield electric line was opened from Balaclava Junction (the intersection of Hawthorn Road with Balaclava Road, Caulfield) via Hawthorn Road and Glenhuntly Road to Elsternwick railway station, and via Glenhuntly Road to Grange Road, Glenhuntly, and via Balaclava and Waverley roads to Darling Road, East Malvern. On 24 April 1914 the Caulfield Station loop line was opened, mainly to serve the nearby racecourse.

The Balaclava Junction dates from November 1913, (Note: It has not been possible to confirm the precise date of construction and determine whether the current configuration was constructed in a single phase or whether it developed over a period of time.) originally built by the P&MTT, at the time it was the most complex junction on the network. None of the original 1913 tramway infrastructure is extant and the junction has been rebuilt a number of times. The junction was renewed in 1947 and the radius of curvature increased to 3.4 metres (11 ft). The rails and overhead wires were completely replaced in 1986. The junction is still in use; it was upgraded in 2005, when the tracks, poles, switch boxes (and possibly the overhead cables) were renewed by Yarra Trams. An electronic system was installed which allows points on the road to change automatically when a tram approaches. Previously, tram drivers had to manually operate the lever system which shifts the turning plates on the road. The access covers and other items of infrastructure were removed at this time. The network of rails are set in concrete with asphalt road margins.

There were three similar tramway junctions in Adelaide, all of which were removed.

== Description ==
A grand union junction can be described as a double track right angle crossing with double connecting curves around all four corners, therefore having the capacity for vehicles to turn in all directions. Balaclava Junction is believed to be the only grand union in the Southern Hemisphere and it is the only remaining grand union junction in Australia.

Tram routes 3, 16, and 64 all travel through Balaclava Junction. Route 3 runs east-to-west along Balaclava Road, Route 64 runs north–south along Hawthorn Road, and Route 16 curves from westbound Balaclava Road to northbound Hawthorn Road. Route 3d trams heading to or from Glenhuntly tram depot use the north to west curve. The east to south curve is not used regularly, but was included when the junction was renewed in April 2005.

== See also ==
- Trams in Melbourne
- List of places on the Victorian Heritage Register in the City of Glen Eira
