= Meštrović Pavilion =

Cultural venue in Zagreb, Croatia

Meštrović Pavilion Museum of the Revolution
- Meštrovićev paviljon
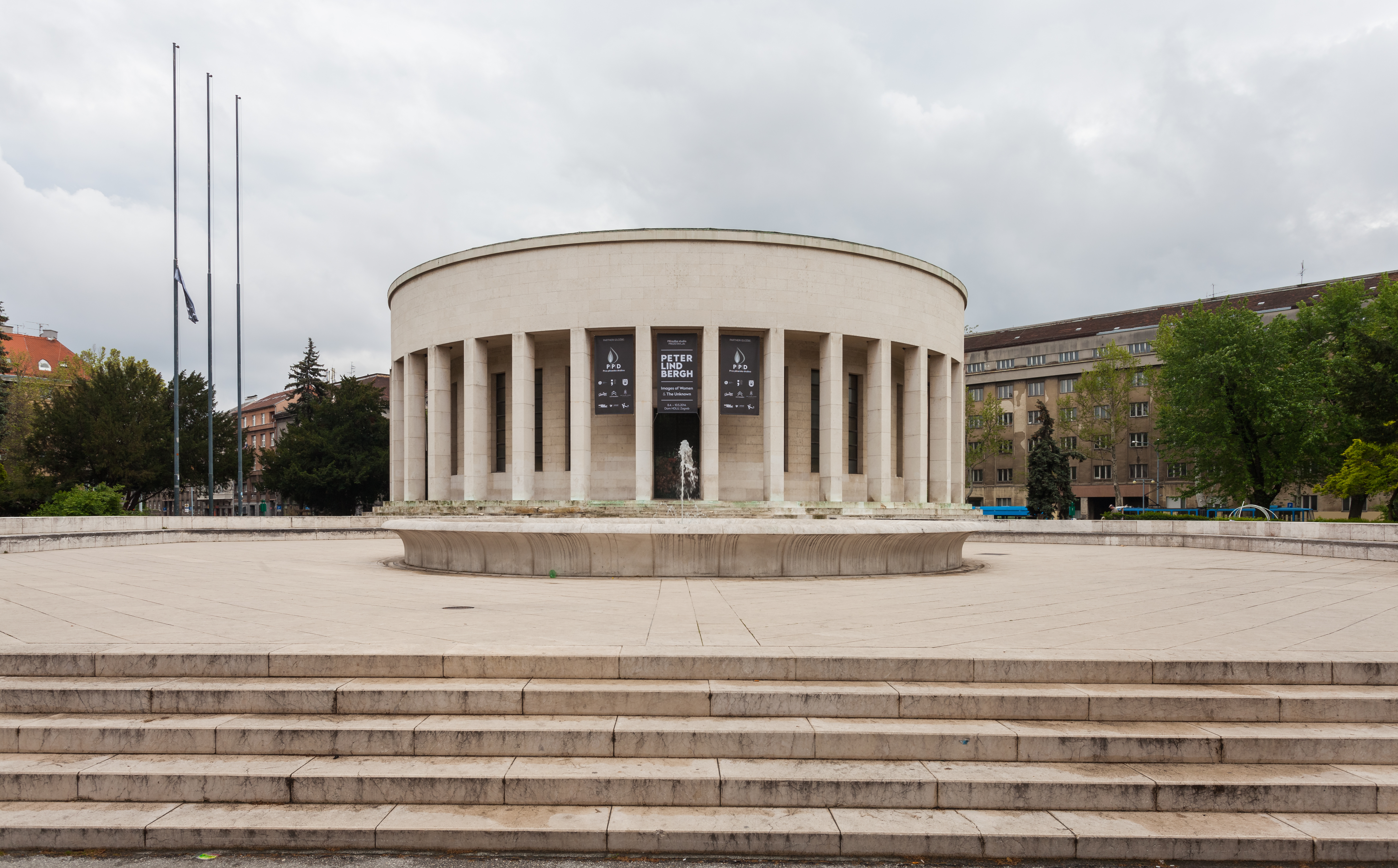
- Location: Square of the Victims of Fascism, Zagreb, Croatia
- Coordinates: 45°48′36″N 15°59′14″E
- Type: Art gallery; Cultural venue
- Building details
- Alternative names: Home of the Croatian Visual Artists

General information
- Type: Rotunda
- Construction started: August 1934
- Completed: 1938

Design and construction
- Architect: Ivan Meštrović

The Meštrović Pavilion (Croatian: Meštrovićev paviljon), also known as the Home of the Croatian Visual Artists (Croatian: Dom hrvatskih likovnih umjetnika) and colloquially as the Mosque (Croatian: Džamija), is a cultural venue and the official seat of the Croatian Society of Fine Artists (HDLU) located on the Square of the Victims of Fascism in central Zagreb, Croatia. Designed by Ivan Meštrović and built in 1938, it has served several functions in its lifetime. An art gallery before World War II, it was converted into a mosque under the Independent State of Croatia (NDH) and was subsequently transformed into the Museum of the Revolution in post-war Yugoslavia. In 1990, it was given back to the Croatian Association of Artists. After extensive renovation, it has served as a space for exhibitions and events since 2006.

== History ==
=== Conception ===
In the early 1930s, the Croatian Art Society Josip Juraj Strossmayer was seeking a new exhibition space. At that time, sculptor Ivan Meštrović, then the president of Art Society Strossmayer, was given the task to create a sculpture in honor of King Peter I for the Square of King Peter (Trg kralja Petra) in Zagreb.

Recognizing an opportunity to combine these two needs, Meštrović suggested that instead of a single sculpture, an entire building be erected on the square. After some negotiation, Meštrović’s proposal was accepted and an endowment for the construction of the House of Fine Arts of King Petar the Great Emancipator was established in 1933.

=== Original construction and layout ===
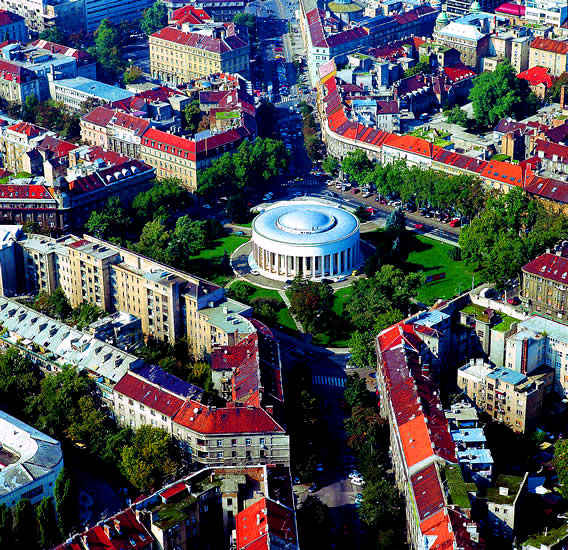
Aerial view from the south-east

Meštrović designed the preliminary concept for the building in 1933. Architects Ladislav Horvat and Harold Bilinić, who frequently collaborated with Meštrović, drew up detailed plans based on Meštrović's conceptual design. The resulting building was one of the first round exhibition halls in the region.

The interior was designed to accommodate three categories of art: sculpture, painting, and photography/works on paper. The main entrance of the pavilion opens into a vestibule flanked on either side by staircases. Directly ahead is the central exhibition hall, a cylindrical space designed for exhibiting sculpture. Above the entrance to this space is a relief of King Peter I by Ivan Meštrović. The staircases lead to a circular exhibition hall. A smaller, concentric exhibition hall opens into the cylindrical space and offers views of the gallery below.

The dome of the pavilion, planned by architect Zvonimir Kavurić, is composed of round glass tiles 57 mm (2.24 in) thick and 125 mm (4.92 in) in diameter, set into a concrete shell with a thickness of 57 mm (2.24 in), allowing natural light to fill the exhibition halls.

The Arts Hall opened on 1 December 1938 with A Half Century of Croatian Art, a major retrospective exhibition.

=== Mosque ===
Meštrović Pavilion
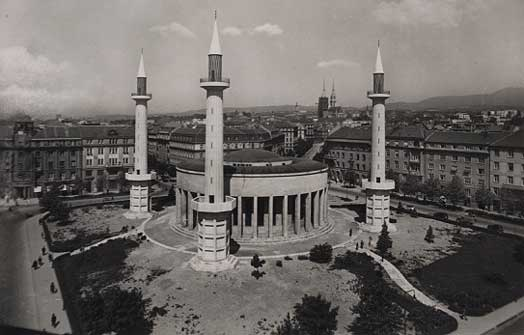
- As a mosque

Religion
- Affiliation: Islam (former)
- Ecclesiastical or organizational status: Mosque (1941–1945)
- Status: Repurposed (as the Museum of the Revolution)

Architecture
- Architects: Zvonimir Požgaj; Stjepan Planić
- Type: Pavillion
- Completed: 1941 (as a mosque)
- Demolished: 1949 (Islamic features removed)

Specifications
- Minaret: 3 (since removed)
- Minaret height: 45 m (148 ft)
- Materials: Iron; concrete; stucco

The pavilion functioned as an art gallery for only three years before it was turned into a mosque in 1941, at the beginning of World War II, as a gesture of the Independent State of Croatia (NDH) towards Bosnian and Croatian Muslims. Architect Zvonimir Požgaj headed the project for adapting the interior of the pavilion to better suit the functions of a mosque, and Stjepan Planić designed the exterior of the mosque. Požgaj significantly altered the interior of the pavilion, introducing a new ceiling of iron and concrete underneath the original ceiling to solve the problem of temperature and acoustics. According to Planić's plans, three 45-metre-high (148 ft) minarets were placed around the pavilion, but the exterior of the building was not altered. Planić also added a fountain flanked by benches in front of the building's main entrance. The interior of the mosque was decorated with stucco patterns based on early Croatian ribbon motifs created by the sculptors Botuhinski, Brill, Ivanković, Jean, Loboda, Lozica, Matijević, Papić, Penić, Perić, Radauš, Štigler, and Turkalj.

The mosque was inaugurated on 18 July 1944 and functioned until 1945. In 1949, the minarets were demolished and the interior decor was removed to make way for the new Museum of the Revolution.

=== The Museum of the Revolution ===
Architect Vjenceslav Richter headed the project to design the Museum of the Revolution, which was to display documents pertaining to Partisan battles during World War II. Richter added an additional floor and new staircases to the interior space and constructed new walls to hide its circular form. All of Richter's additions were designed to attach to the original structure, so that they could be removed without harming the building's interior. The Museum of the Revolution officially opened on 15 April 1955.

=== Restoration and renovation ===
By the mid-1980s, discussions about the function of the pavilion had resumed, and in 1988, the curators of the Museum of the Revolution invited architects Ivan Crnković and Dubravka Kisić to draw up a study on the feasibility of restoring the pavilion to its original form. In May 1990, the Croatian Association of Artists (HDLU), headed by Ante Rašić, organized the exhibition Dokumenti-Argumenti to present the history of the building. In 1993, the City Council of Zagreb granted permission to the Croatian Association of Artists to move their seat back to the pavilion.

Renovation of the pavilion began in 2001 according to the plans of architect Andrija Mutnjaković. The first phase of construction included the removal of all non-original layers and structures and was completed in 2003. In 2006, parts of the cellar and ground floor were renovated following the plans of architect Branko Silađin.

== Croatian Association of Artists ==
Since 1993, the pavilion has served as the official seat of the Croatian Association of Artists (HDLU), a union of professional artists established in 1868. The aims of the association are to support and encourage contemporary visual expression, to improve and protect the freedom of visual expression, and to influence legislation regulating visual arts production and the social rights of artists. Additionally, HDLU organizes over 40 exhibitions and events annually, held in the pavilion's three exhibition spaces: the Ring Gallery, the Barrel Gallery, and the Extended Media (PM) Gallery. A fourth exhibition space, Karas Gallery, is located on Praška Street near Ban Jelačić Square.

The Meštrović Pavilion is also one of the founding members of The 360° Project, an international network of round arts venues in Europe and Canada.

=== Croatia to the World Exhibition ===
In February 2021, the HDLU, in collaboration with Večernji list and the Academy of Fine Arts, compiled a list of the 38 Croatians (ethnically Croat or connected to Croatia) who gave most to the world, influencing global history. They organized an exhibition held at the Meštrović Pavilion, entitled Croatia to the World (Hrvatska svijetu), including over a thousand items connected to the thirty-eight masterminds. The first twelve names were chosen in 2019, but the list was then extended to 38 greats by February 2021. The 38 great Croatians in the list are: Ivo Andrić, Giorgio Baglivi, Josip Belušić, Roger Joseph Boscovich, Ivana Brlić-Mažuranić, Giulio Clovio, Benedetto Cotrugli, Ivan Česmički, Marino Ghetaldi, Franjo Hanaman, Jerome, Marcel Kiepach, Slavko Kopač, Anthony Francis Lucas, Giovanni Luppis, Dora Maar, Marko Marulić, Ivan Meštrović, Zinka Milanov, Andrija Mohorovičić, Franciscus Patricius, Slavoljub Eduard Penkala, Marco Polo, Herman Potočnik, Vladimir Prelog, Mario Puratić, Lavoslav Ružan, Andrea Schiavone, David Schwarz, Pope Sixtus V, Mia Slavenska, Rudolf Steiner, Andrija Štampar, Milka Ternina, Nikola Tesla, Fausto Veranzio, Juan Vucetich, and Nikola IV Zrinski.

== See also ==
- List of museums in Croatia
