= Caulfield North =

- Suburb
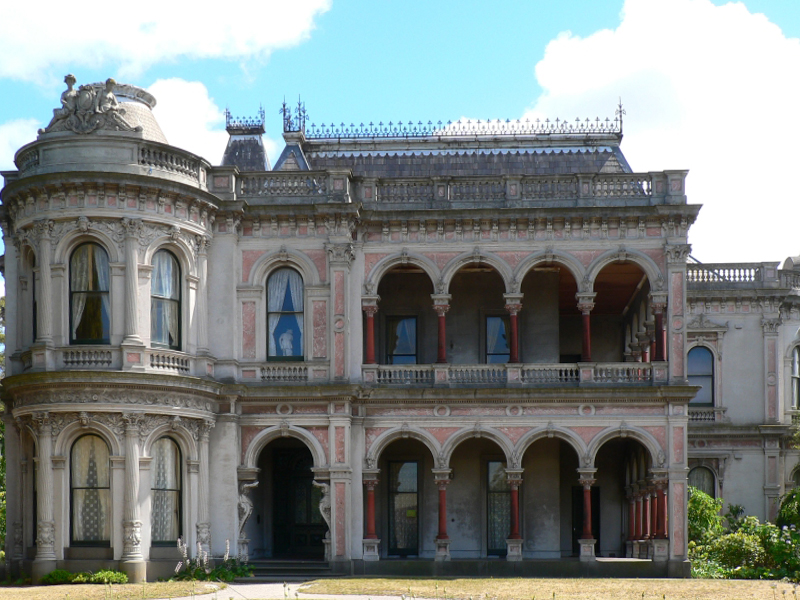
- Labassa, Manor Grove

- Interactive map of Caulfield North
- Coordinates: 37.873°S 145.025°E
- Country: Australia
- State: Victoria
- City: Melbourne
- LGA: City of Glen Eira
- Location: 8 km (5.0 mi) from Melbourne

Government
  - State electorate: Caulfield
  - Federal division: Macnamara

Area
  - Total: 4.2 km^{2} (1.6 sq mi)
- Elevation: 48 m (157 ft)

Population
  - Total: 16,903 (2021 census)
  - Density: 4,020/km^{2} (10,420/sq mi)
- Postcode: 3161
Suburbs around Caulfield North
Prahran	Armadale	Malvern
St Kilda East	Caulfield North	Caulfield East
Elsternwick	Caulfield	Caulfield East

Caulfield North is an inner suburb in Melbourne, Victoria, Australia, 8 km south-east of Melbourne's Central Business District, located within the City of Glen Eira local government area. Caulfield North recorded a population of 16,903 at the 2021 census.

It is bounded by Orrong Road in the west, Glen Eira Road in the south, Dandenong Road in the north and Kambrook Road in the east. The suburb contains Caulfield Park – a park of approximately 26 hectares (64.25 acres), bounded by Balaclava Road, Inkerman Road, Hawthorn Road, and Park Crescent.

Caulfield North has a large Jewish population: 8619, representing 41.1% of its population, according to the 2016 census data. The suburb's population has a high level of educational attainment, with 45.6% having a bachelor's degree or above compared to 24.3% for Victoria and 22.0% for Australia.

== History ==
Caulfield North was once the location of many large Victorian mansions, most of which were demolished in the early twentieth century and the large estates that they were built upon were then subdivided.

A notable survivor is Labassa, owned by the National Trust. The mansion was originally built in 1862 and extended in 1873. In 1889 further extensions and lavish refurbishment commissioned by William Alexander Robertson created the present mansion, a heritage property designed in the French Renaissance style and noted for its opulent 19th-century interiors, which is of national significance. The house is sometimes used for filming of the ABC's lady detective series Miss Fisher's Murder Mysteries, and was one of the filming locations for the 2002 film Queen of the Damned.

Many streets in the suburb were named in the late 1850s after Crimea War locations and people. For example; Cardigan, Canrobert, Inkerman, Alma, Raglan, Redan, and Balaclava.

The Caulfield North Post Office was opened on 26 March 1915.

== Public transport ==
Trams service Caulfield North extensively, with a major tram interchange at Balaclava Junction. Tram routes 3, 16 and 64 all service Caulfield North. Caulfield North also contains Balaclava Junction, the only extant grand union in the Southern Hemisphere, a junction where trams can go in all directions from all directions.

Trains connect the suburb to the city via the major transport interchange, Caulfield railway station at Caulfield East (via tram route 3). Trains also connect the suburb to the city through Balaclava railway station (via tram routes 3 and 16).

== Notable people ==
Australian television personality Graham Kennedy went to the Caulfield North State School (now Caulfield Junior College), in Balaclava Road.

== Gallery ==
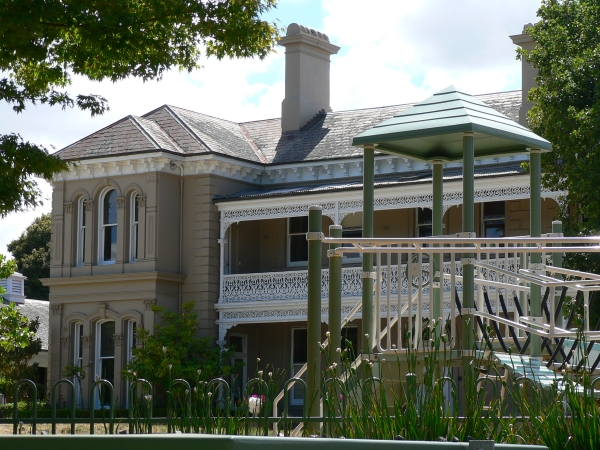
Grimwade House, now part of Melbourne Grammar School

== See also ==
- City of Caulfield – Caulfield North was previously within this former local government area.
