= Provincial Road =

Provincial Road may refer to a state highway, which is usually a road that is either numbered or maintained by a sub-national state or province

In particular, it may refer to:

- Provincial road (Italy), a class of road in Italy
- Provincial road (Turkey), a class of road in Turkey
- Essex County Road 46 in Ontario, Canada, known as Provincial Road for part of its length
