= Stjepan Planić =

Croatian architect (1900–1980)

- Born: 27 December 1900; Zagreb, Austria-Hungary
- Died: 26 December 1980 (aged 79)
- Occupation: Architect
- Awards: Vladimir Nazor life achievement award (1968), Viktor Kovačić life achievement award (1972)
- Buildings: Napredak zadruga, Villa Fuhrmann, The Mountaineer's Home Tomislav

Stjepan Planić (27 December 1900 – 26 December 1980) was a Croatian architect. His style can be described as a synthesis of functionalist and organic architecture.

== Biography ==
From 1920 to 1922 he worked for the architect Rudolf Lubinsky and, after 1927, in his own practice in Zagreb. He also studied architecture (1927–31) at the Academy of Fine Arts Zagreb, in the studio of Drago Ibler and in 1931 joined the progressive group founded by Ibler, the Earth Group.

Planić was a protagonist of the social ideals of modern architecture as well as the aesthetic, and he had a special interest in social or low-cost housing. Ironically, however, he became a sought-after specialist in the design of luxury villas in Zagreb, and was thus marked as a hypocrite. In answer to this charges, he designed office and residential buildings in the centre of Zagreb, which are characterized by simplicity and functional planning; examples include the residential buildings in Draškovićeva Street (1932), Marinkovićeva Street, Bogovićeva Street (1937) and Martićeva Street (1938). He also wrote three "Letters on housing", in which he explains his working concepts in letters to a housewife.

In 1942 he converted the circular Arts Pavilion, Trg žrtava fašizma, Zagreb, designed by the sculptor Ivan Meštrović, into a mosque by adding three free-standing minarets around the body of the central cylinder and designing a new interior richly decorated with arabesques. The mosque, a monumental and somewhat bizarre addition to the Central European appearance of its surroundings, was demolished in 1949 for political reasons, and Planić was anathemized because of it.

After the war, he worked in the Ministry of Construction (1945–1950), Principle Directory of Construction (1950–1952) Secretariat for Construction and Urbanism (1959–1962).

On 30 July 1970 Planić retired but continued with his architectural work. In 1968 he received the Vladimir Nazor Award for Lifetime Achievement and in 1972 the "Viktor Kovačić" Award for Lifetime Achievement.
