= Grand union =

Four-way arrangement at a railway junction

Track arrangement of a street railway Grand Union

A grand union is a rail track junction where two double-track railway or tramway lines cross at grade, often in a street intersection or crossroads. A total of sixteen railroad switches (sets of points) allow streetcars (or in rarer installations, trains) coming from any direction to take any of the three other directions. The same effect may be achieved with two adjacent wyes if the location allows for space.

== Complexity ==
These types of complex junction are expensive to build and expensive to maintain. Special parts, sometimes made of manganese steel, are needed for each location where one rail crossed another (a "frog"); these parts often need to be custom-made and fitted for each single location, depending on the specific angle of crossing of the intersecting streets.

A full grand union junction consists of 88 frogs (where one rail crosses another rail), and 32 switchpoints (point blades) if single-point switches are not used. A tram or train crossing the junction will encounter four or twenty frogs within the space of crossing the junction.

For all of the possible tracks of a grand union to be used during normal operation, at least six different tram routes have to cross the union. In an intersection with lines oriented towards cardinal directions, these could be: north-south, north-east, north-west, south-east, south-west, and east–west.

== Three-quarter, half and butterfly unions ==
Three-quarter unions are similar to grand unions in that they are also rail track junctions where two double-track railway lines cross at grade, often in a street intersection or crossroads; the primary difference being that one corner of the crossing does not have curved junction tracks, with the union having a total of 12 railroad switches (sets of points).

Half unions are similar, but have curved junction tracks on only two adjoining corners of the intersection, with a total of eight switches.

Butterfly unions share the total of eight switches, but the curved junction tracks are on opposing corners.

== Examples ==
=== Europe ===
==== Austria (0) ====
- Vienna has a three-quarter union at Quellenplatz, 48°10′32.3″N 16°22′24.7″E

==== Belgium (1) ====
- Brussels has a grand union at carrefour Buyl – Général Jacques, 50°49′05.9″N 4°22′45.8″E

==== Croatia (1) ====
- Zagreb has a grand union at the intersection of Savska and Vodnikova Street, 45.80545°N 15.96627°E, and a three-quarter union at the intersection of Vukovarska and Držićeva Avenue, 45.80113°N 15.999°E.

==== Czech Republic (4) ====
- Brno, has a three-quarter union at 49°12′16.24″N 16°37′25.54″E.
- Olomouc, has one grand union at 49°35′44.42″N 17°14′50.27″E.
- Prague, has three grand unions, first at 50°6′12.65″N, 14°28′23.89″E the second at 50°5′55.94″N, 14°25′59.76″E. and the third at 50°4′23.19″N 14°24′50.30″E, this Grand Union was rebuilt in 2003 and has curved trackwork as the streets are not aligned at the river crossing.

==== Estonia (0) ====
- Tallinn has a butterfly union at the intersection of Narva maantee, Hobujaama and A. Laikmaa streets at 59°26′14.07″ N 24°45′26.21″ E. The new crossing line started service in 2024 and connects the city harbor to the rest of the system.

==== Finland (0) ====
- Helsinki has a three-quarter union at the intersection of Simonkatu and Mannerheimintie, 60.1699°N 24.9385°E, and a butterfly union at the intersection of Runeberginkatu and Mannerheimintie, 60.1817°N 24.9273°E. These are probably the northernmost unions in the world.

==== Germany (12) ====
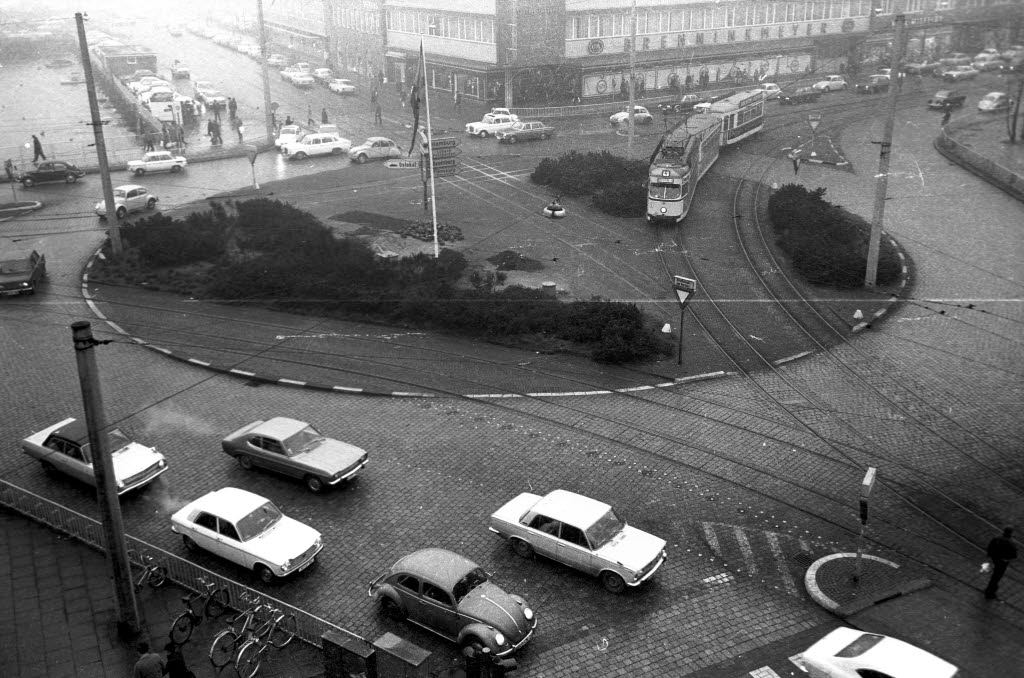
Berliner Platz, in Kiel (1971).

- Bremen has a full grand union under construction at the stop Bennigsenstraße at 53°4′13.8″N 8°51′22.2″E. It is used since August 2025, full usage will be from approximately 2028.
- Cologne has one grand union at the stop Aachener Straße / Gürtel at 50°56′13.2″N 6°54′30.4″E, and one three-quarter union at Barbarossaplatz 50°55′42.9″N 6°56′33.7″E
- Cottbus has one grand union at 51°45′39.86″N 14°19′51.39″E and a three-quarter union at 51°44′57.54″N 14°19′42.50″E.
- Dresden has two grand unions at 51°3′49.47″N 13°44′48.95″E (Albertplatz) and 51°2′58.09″N 13°44′39.27″E (Hauptbahnhof), two three-quarter unions at Fetscherplatz and Könneritzstraße/Jahnstraße as well as a five-eighths union at 51°3′47.55″N 13°44′13.53″E
- Duisburg has a butterfly union at Marxloh, Pollmann at 51°30′7.44″N 6°45′25.78″E
- Kiel had a half union on Berliner Platz.
- Erfurt has a butterfly union at 50.976099°N 11.034358°E, its modern city center: the Anger.
- Karlsruhe's system has the most in Germany, with four grand unions at Stop Mathystraße (49°0′8.96″N 8°23′39.77″E), at Entenfang (49°00′37.1″N 8°21′31.8″E)., at intersection Rüppurrer Straße and Baumeisterstraße, and at the adjacent intersection at Stop Rüppurrer Tor. A three-quarter union is at Stop Tullastraße, two half unions at Weinbrennerplatz and Eberstraße and a butterfly union at Durlacher Tor.
- Kassel's system has a single grand union at 51°19′4.87″N 9°30′1.02″E and a three-quarter union at 51°18′43.02″N 9°29′29.64″E.
- Leipzig has a grand union at 51°20′39.35″N 12°22′15.99″E it is unique in interfacing with four tracks at Goerdelerring tram stop. There is a three-quarter union at 51°19′56.49″N 12°20′19.68″E, a half union at 51°20′31.31″N 12°21′31.15″E and butterfly unions at 51°19′12.95″N 12°19′48.80″E, 51°20′20.36″N 12°21′44.96″E and 51°21′44.93″N 12°21′55.79″.
- Munich has one real grand union at Ostfriedhof since the last track alteration in 2015 at 48°07′8.6″N 11°35′1″E. A three-quarter union can be found on Leonrodplatz at 48°09′34.2″N 11°32′50.8″E. While not a traditional grand union, the Munich tram system has also a "grand circle" which has the same route function as a grand union and also provides a loop for all lines, it is at Maxmonument in Maximilianstrasse, 48°8′15.27″N, 11°35′17.02″E.

==== Italy (2) ====
- Milan: the Milan tram network currently has two grand unions. The first is a non standard design with divided North South tracks around a monument at piazza 24 Maggio, and the second located nearby at piazzale Porta Lodovica. (Note: In summer 2022 it is going to lose one of the diverging tracks. Works ongoing.) There used to be another large one until the 1990s at piazza della Repubblica, but it has since reduced to a wye junction still keeping the layout of diverging routes by the removal of the straight route to via Vittor Pisani.
- Rome: This network does not have a Grand Union but a Grand Circle, at the Porta Maggiore, east of Roma Termini railway station.

==== Netherlands (4) ====
- Amsterdam, Netherlands: As of 2009, the Amsterdam tram system continues to have four grand unions. However, none of them has tram routes running in all directions under normal operation. They are at 52°21′17.39″N 4°54′4.49″E; 52°21′45.91″N 4°52′31.04″E and 52°22′12.13″N 4°51′0.94″E. and 52°21′9.99″N 4°53′28.04″E;
- Rotterdam: the Rotterdam tram system has one three-quarter union, at Vasteland – Westzeedijk 51°54′41.4″N 4°28′39.0″E;
- The Hague: The Hague tram system has one butterfly union at the crossing of the Laan van Meerdervoort and the Koningin Emmakade/Waldeck Pyrmontkade (S100), (52°04′54.1″N 4°17′15.9″E). There is also a half union at the crossing of the Loosduinseweg and the Monstersestraat, (52°04′22.2″N 4°17′30.5″E)

==== Poland (15) ====
- Kraków has four grand unions, one at Rondo Grzegórzeckie (50°03′27.42″N 19°57′32.40″E), one at Starowiślna (50°03′23.40″N 19°56′43.63″E), one at Rondo Kocmyrzowskie im. ks. Gorzelanego (50°04′46.65″N 20°01′38.49″E) and one at Rondo Czyżyńskie (50°04′24.31″N 20°01′02.89″E). There is a "grand circle" at Plac Centralny im. Ronalda Reagana (50°04′19.56″N 20°02′14.46″E) which has the same route function as a grand union and also provides a loop for all lines. There is a three-quarter union at Stradom (50°03′06.26″N 19°56′30.22″E).
- Poznań: The Poznań Tram system has 6 grand unions, which may be the most extant in any city. They are at: 52°24′37.94″N, 16°54′48.53″E; 52°24′28.02″N, 16°54′44.97″E; 52°24′9.54″N, 16°53′20.65″E; 52°23′24.39″N, 16°53′39.07″E; 52°22′48.68″N, 16°56′35.21″E and 52°23′57.53″N, 16°57′8.97″E. All can be seen in detail on Google Earth.
- Warsaw: The Warsaw system has four grand unions, first at 52°14′30.79″N 20°59′37.00″E second at 52°14′13.30″N 20°58′48.62″E, third at 52°22'01.84"N, 21°00'49.14"E, and fourth at 52°18'87.92"N 21°00'20.16"E. There is a three-quarter union at 52°15′17.24″N 20°58′57.11″E, and 52°26'35.68"N 21°02'07.88"E.
- Wrocław has one grand union at 51°07'01.6"N 17°02'31.3"E. There are also three-quarters unions at 51°06'04.8"N 17°01'45.3"E, 51°06'16.5"N 17°01'19.6"E, 51°06'41.9"N 17°01'18.3"E and 51°07'03.5"N 17°01'54.8"E

==== Romania ====
- Bucharest : The Dristor intersection is a seven-eighths union missing the left turn from Mihai Bravu to Theodor Pallady. This direction is made on a street earlier, because, together with the right turn from Theodor Pallady to Mihai Bravu also operates as a turning loop used usually by temporary lines or emergency loop.

==== Russia (0) ====
- Kazan: Kazan Tram system had one grand union. It is at 55.780459 N, 49.112853 E. Street View in Google Earth shows that this Grand Union has been partially removed, portions still remain in the pavement in 2013.
- Moscow: Moscow Tram system has one three-quarter union on Preobrazhenskaya Ploshad
- Saint Petersburg: Saint Petersburg Tram system has a three-quarter union on Svetlanovskaya Ploshad, a three-quarter union on Irinovskiy Prospekt and a butterfly union on Prospekt Kultury
- Angarsk: Angarsk Tram system had one Full grand union which was partially removed in 2000s
- Kaliningrad: Kaliningrad Tram system had one grand union. It was at 54.712167N, 20.523258E This Grand Union was partially removed in 2009 to become a 'T junction' with full movements.[1]

==== Slovakia (0) ====
- Košice, had one grand union at 48°42′18″N 21°14′35″E, in 2018 that was replaced with a Grand Circle, which can be seen on Google Earth.

==== Sweden (0) ====
- Gothenburg: The Gothenburg tram network has two three-quarter unions: one at Brunnsparken (57.706469°N 11.968183°E) and one (non-standard) at Järntorget (57.700083°N 11.953533°E). These both lack curves at their north-east corner, as does the junction at Vasaplatsen (57.698698°N 11.969680°E), which is halfway between a butterfly union and a three-quarter union, having a curve at its southwest corner for trams heading east but not in the opposite direction.

==== Switzerland (1) ====
- Basel, the Basel system has a grand union at 47 33' 48.62"N 7 35' 57.96"E and a (nonstandard) grand union at 47°33′4.83″N 7°35′41.89″E.

==== United Kingdom (0) ====
- The UK had at least four grand unions, at Salford, South Shields, Liverpool, and Walthamstow. As of 2008 the components of the Salford union were stored at the National Tramway Museum at Crich.

=== Americas (3) ===
==== Canada (3) ====
- Edmonton: The Edmonton Radial Railway had a single grand union at the intersection of 109th Street and Jasper Avenue, although one side of the junction remained as a stub and was removed by the late 1930s.
- Montreal: The system operated by Montreal Tramways Company (Montreal street railway system) had several grand unions, with one known to be at the intersection of Ste. Catherine and St. Lawrence Streets.
- Toronto: The most extensive street railway system in the Americas is the Toronto streetcar system of the Toronto Transit Commission in southern Ontario, which has many four-way streetcar intersections, including the only extant grand unions remaining in the Western Hemisphere. The system includes three grand unions, one seven-eighths union (one curve short of a grand union), four three-quarter unions (missing 2 curves at a single corner), three more unions with 6 curves and many unions in various configurations with less than 6 curves. The "traditional" grand unions are at Bathurst and King (43°38′38.14″N 79°24′9.50″W); Spadina and King (43°38′43.73″N 79°23′42.09″W) and Spadina and Queen (43°38′55.43″N 79°23′46.91″W). King and Dufferin (43°38′20.15″N 79°25′38.45″W) is a "seven-eighths union": it is missing the curve from southbound to westbound.
- Brantford, Ontario: The Brantford Municipal Railway installed a UK-made grand union at Colborne and Market Streets circa 1910. It remained in service until the end of streetcar service in the city on 31 January 1940. It was taken up for scrap in 1940.

==== United States (0) ====
- Akron: The Akron streetcar system had one grand union at the intersection of Main and Exchange Streets,
- Boston: The Boston Elevated Railway had four grand unions on Washington Street, at Hanover Street, Boylston and Essex Streets, Southampton Street, and Dover Street. Dover Street was also a part of another, albeit asymmetrical, grand union where it intersected Tremont Street and terminated into Berkeley Street, leading to another grand union at the intersection of Berkeley and Columbus Avenue. Another grand union existed at the intersection of Massachusetts Avenue and Huntington Avenue. An eighth grand union had existed at Dewey Square.
- Chicago: The Chicago Transit Authority has a three-quarter union at Tower 18, on the northwest corner of The Loop. This union has the notable distinctions of not only being built entirely on elevated bridgework over the streets below, but also being fully equipped with third rails for power distribution.
- Philadelphia: SEPTA has a surviving example of a half union at the intersection of Chester Avenue and 49th Street; and PTC previously had two butterfly unions, the first at Erie Ave and Old York Road and the second at Lancaster Avenue and 33rd Street; as well as a second half union at Allegheny and 22nd Street.
- Pittsburgh: Pittsburgh's trolley system had a three-quarter union at the intersection of 5th Avenue and Craig St.
- Rochester, New York: Rochester's surface streetcar system had three full grand unions, all of which were on Main Street, as well as two three-quarter unions, and three half unions.
- Seattle: The Seattle-Tacoma Interurban was believed to have a single grand union, at N. 34th St. and Fremont Ave.
- San Francisco: The San Francisco Municipal Railway's light rail line has a quarter union at 4th Street and King Street. The N Judah route crosses 4th, and the current T Third route uses the turn connecting the tracks on King northwest of the intersection to those on 4th to the southwest; the tracks on 4th across King lead to the Central Subway.
- Salt Lake City: The Utah Transit Authority's TRAX system has 2 half unions(Main Street Interlocking at 40°45′38.2″N 111°53′28.3″W and the Airport Junction Interlocking at 40°46′09.7″N 111°54′08.4″W), 1 quarter union (Union Interlocking at 40°43′21.1″N 111°53′48.8″W), and a three interlocking combination that offers the effect of a half union (Lovendahl/Ephraim/Sugar Interlockings at 40°37′56.2″N 111°53′54.7″W).

==== Galleries ====
Americas gallery

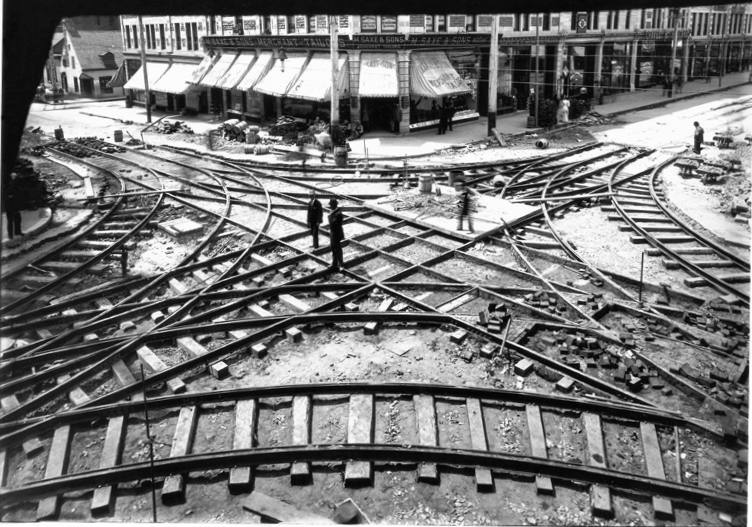
A Grand union tramway crossing under construction in Montreal at Sainte Catherine and Saint Lawrence Street in 1893

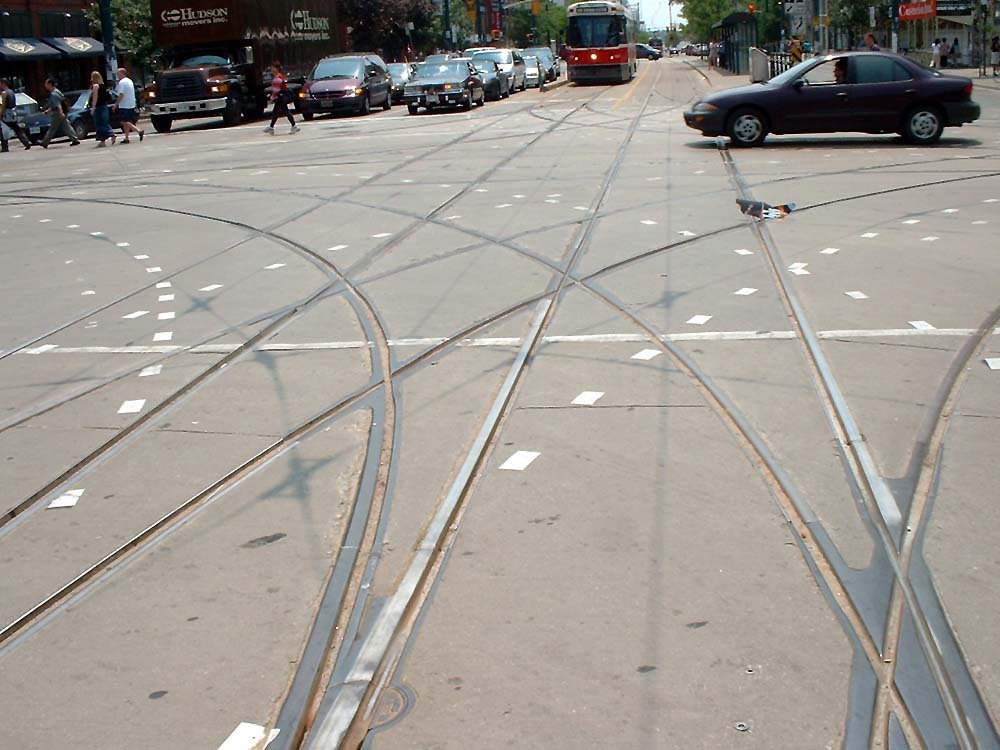
A grand union at Spadina Avenue and Queen Street West in Toronto, Ontario

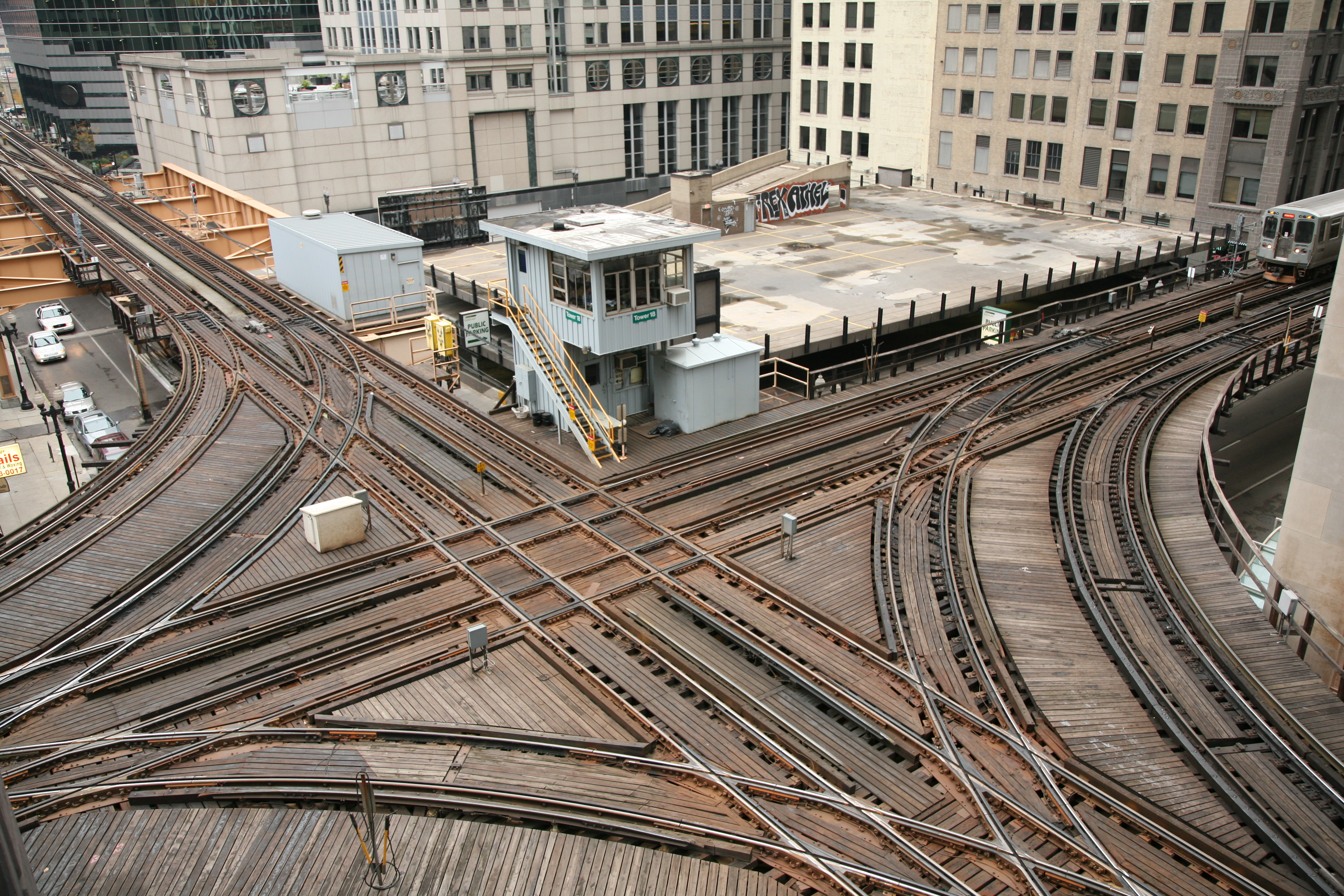
Chicago Transit Authority control tower 18 at this three-quarter union guides elevated Chicago 'L' north and southbound Purple and Brown lines intersecting with east and westbound Pink and Green lines and the looping Orange line above the Wells and Lake street intersection in the Loop.

=== Oceania ===
==== Australia (1) ====
- Adelaide, Australia: The 1908–1958 electric tram system had three grand unions, at King William Street and North Terrace, King William and Wakefield Streets (Victoria Square), and at Pulteney and Wakefield Streets.
- Melbourne, Australia: The only surviving grand union in the Southern Hemisphere is Balaclava Junction on the Melbourne tram system, in Australia. It is at 37°52′21.56″S 145°1′29.01″E. There is also a three-quarter union at the intersection of Victoria Parade and Nicholson Street, East Melbourne. Route 3 runs east-west along Balaclava Road, with Route 64 running north-south along Hawthorn Road while Route 16 takes the west-to-north curve. The southern corners are used by trams accessing Glenhuntly depot while the top-right curve is used for diversions or other reasons.

==== New Zealand (0) ====
- Auckland, New Zealand: The Auckland system formerly had two grand unions, at Queen Street's intersections with both Customs Street and Wellesley Street.

== See also ==
- Diamond crossing
