= Church of St. Augustine, Forest =

Church in Forest, Belgium

Church of St. Augustine
- Église Saint-Augustin (French); Sint-Augustinuskerk (Dutch)
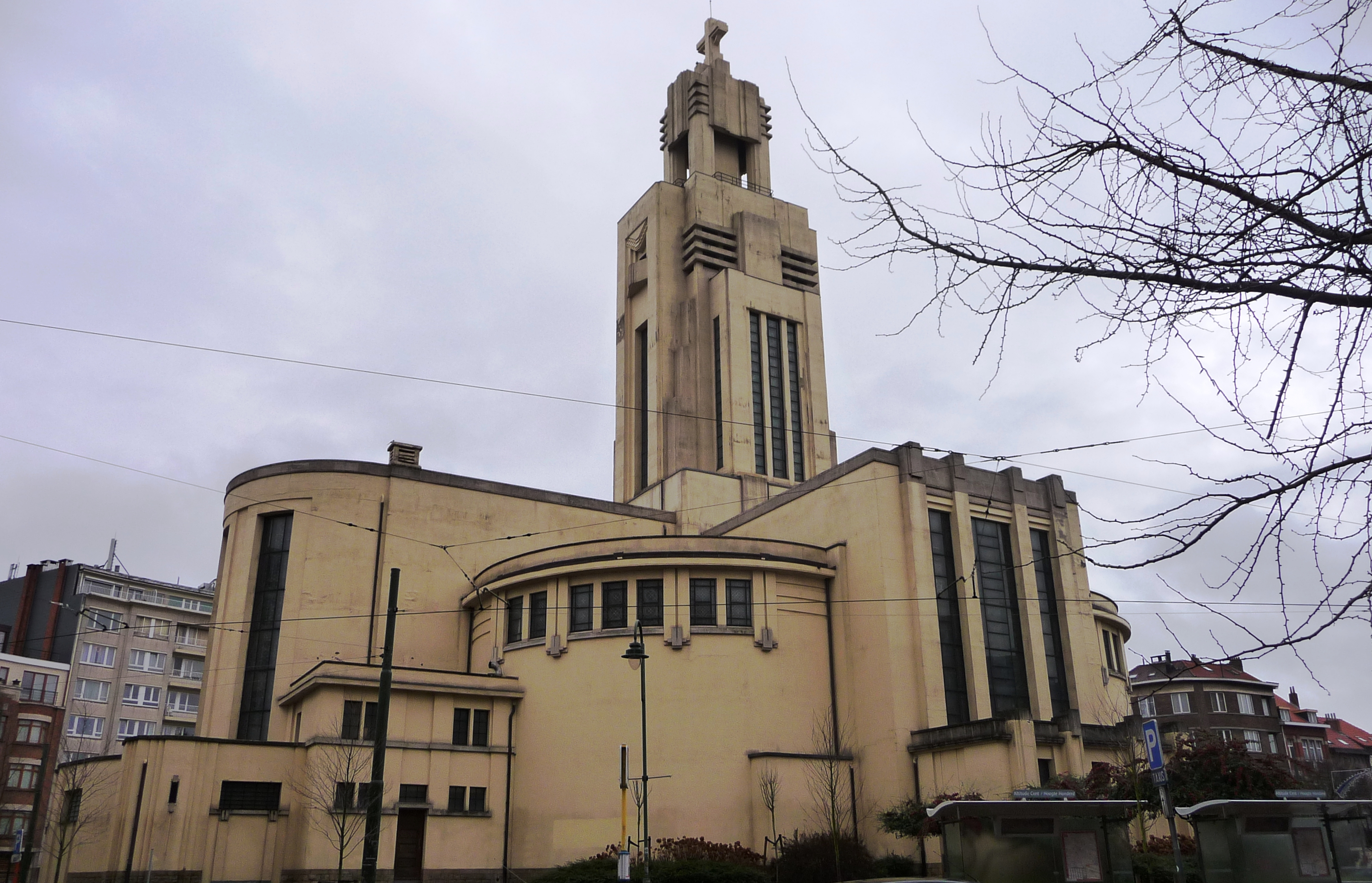
- Church of St. Augustine in Forest
- Church of St. Augustine
- 50°48′59″N 4°20′12″E
- Location: Place de l'Altitude Cent / Hoogte Honderdplein; 1190 Forest, Brussels-Capital Region
- Country: Belgium
- Denomination: Catholic Church
- Website: Official website

History
- Status: Parish church
- Dedication: Saint Augustine

Architecture
- Functional status: Active
- Heritage designation: Protected
- Designated: 08/08/1988
- Architect(s): Léon Guiannotte, André Watteyne
- Architectural type: Church
- Style: Art Deco
- Years built: 1932–1935

Specifications
- Materials: Reinforced concrete

Administration
- Archdiocese: Mechelen–Brussels

Clergy
- Archbishop: Luc Terlinden (Primate of Belgium)

The Church of St. Augustine (French: Église Saint-Augustin; Dutch: Sint-Augustinuskerk) is a Catholic parish church in Forest, a municipality of Brussels, Belgium. It is dedicated to Saint Augustine.

Designed by the architects Léon Guiannotte and André Watteyne in Art Deco style, and built between 1932 and 1935, it is one of three major churches in Brussels made of reinforced concrete (the other two are the Basilica of the Sacred Heart in Koekelberg and the Church of St. John the Baptist in Molenbeek-Saint-Jean). The building received protected status on 8 August 1988.

The church is located on the Place de l'Altitude Cent/Hoogte Honderdplein (a square named due to its altitude of one hundred metres above sea level), not far from Duden Park and the Chaussée d'Alsemberg/Alsembergsesteenweg.

== History ==
=== Inception and construction ===
A chapel dedicated to Saint Augustine was built in Forest at the beginning of the 20th century. Its aim was to meet the pastoral needs of this southern suburb of Brussels, whose population was rapidly increasing. As it soon proved cramped, in 1908, a new project was discussed: that of a large church in the very centre of the Place de l'Altitude Cent/Hoogte Honderdplein, towards which eight of the district's major arteries converge.

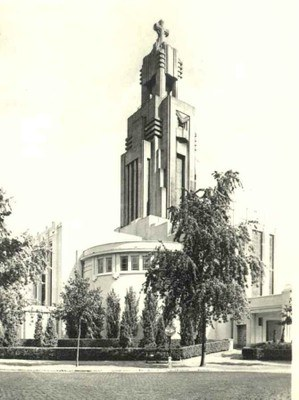
The Church of St. Augustine shortly after completion

The initial plan from 1913 was to build a church in the traditional neo-Romanesque style. However, in 1914, World War I broke out and the post-war period changed all priorities. The project to build the church returned to the agenda in 1931, but the initial designs were then completely abandoned by its new promoters and by the architect Léon Guiannotte, who took charge of the construction, adopting the Art Deco style instead. His project, which completely ignored the traditional models of religious buildings of the past, was only made possible thanks to the use of reinforced concrete, which defined both the architectural forms and the construction techniques.

The Church of St. Augustine is a continuation of a series of reinforced concrete churches that the brothers Auguste and Gustave Perret had begun in Le Raincy, France, in the 1920s. The idea was daring because this material had not yet proven itself. The bulk of the work was completed in two years (1933–1935). On Easter Monday (25 March 1935), the church was consecrated by Cardinal Van Roey and opened to worship. In fact, completion work would continue until 1950.

=== Repairs and protection ===
The reinforced concrete used for the church's construction has proven to be of very poor quality over the years. Already after thirty years, in the 1960s, the church began to deteriorate. Due to water penetration, the roof covering began to crack, corrode and rust the concrete's metal reinforcements. The building thus became dangerous. Its status as a protected monument and the still high interest in Art Deco and modernism in Brussels have put an end to the debate about its possible demolition (to make way for the metro line). Major renovation work was carried out between 1996 and 1998 to restore the building to its initial state.

== Description ==
The floor plan is a Greek cross encased in a circle. The bell tower, supported by four pillars, is located on the crossing of the nave and transept. It is open on the inside and has a 37-metre-high (121 ft) panoramic platform. The cross on top reaches 54 metres (177 ft) above the square. The nave has a portal on the south side and a chancel and sacristy on the north side. In the design, the classic floor plan is broken up but not abandoned. The four quarter circles between the arms of the cross have not yet been integrated into a true modernist space. The sober exterior contrasts with the rich materials used inside.

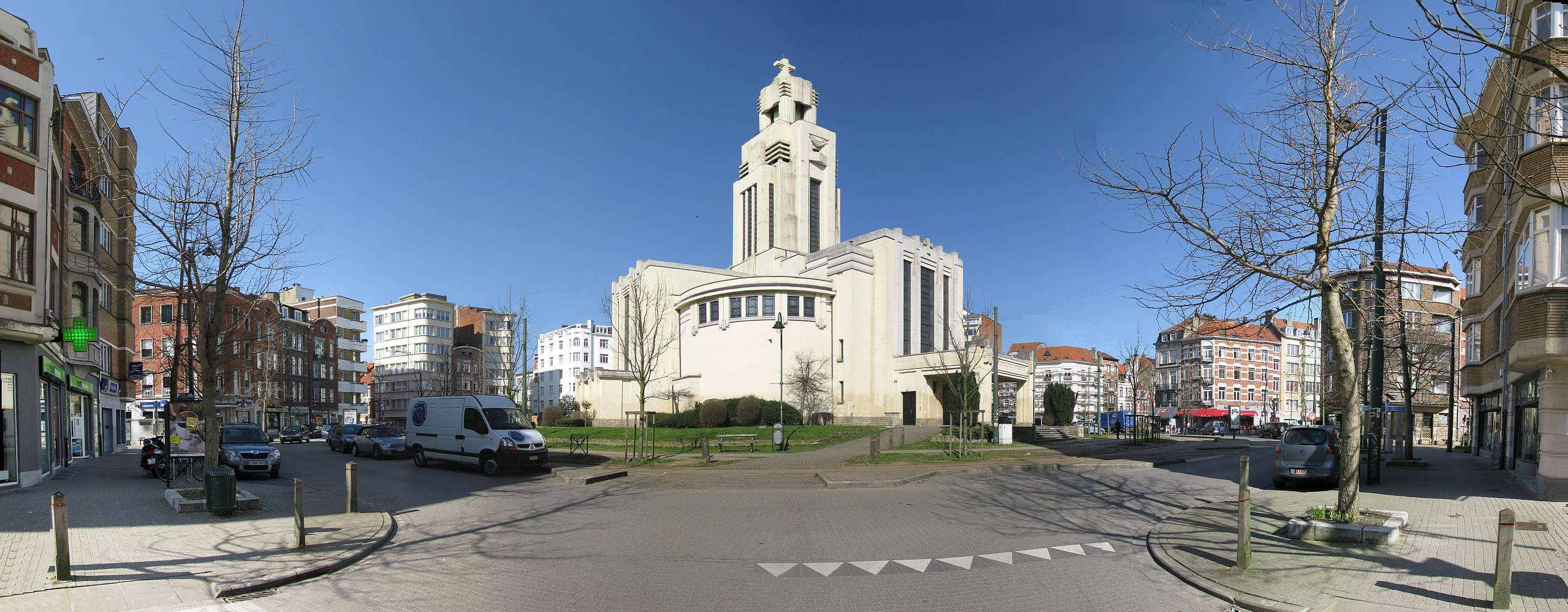
The church on the Place de l'Altitude Cent/Hoogte Honderdplein

== See also ==
- List of churches in Brussels
- Catholic Church in Belgium
- Art Deco in Brussels
- History of Brussels
- Culture of Belgium
- Belgium in the long nineteenth century
