= Croatian Association of Visual Artists =

HULU Split
- Formation: 1945; 81 years ago
- Type: Non-Governmental Organization
- Headquarters: Obala hrvatskog narodnog preporoda 24, 21000 Split
- President: Ana Bratić
- Website: hulu-split.hr

The Croatian Association of Visual Artists in Split (HULU Split) is a nonprofit, nonpartisan professional association for visual artists, founded in 1945. Being the only association of that sort in the Split-Dalmatia County, HULU plays a central role in the contemporary art scene of Split, often as the primary and only bearer of cultural life in the city.

With over 500 members of professional artists and art historians, the Association manages several key exhibition spaces like the Kula Gallery, the Small Chapel Apse and Salon Galić, organizing around thirty exhibitions each year.

== History and development ==
The foundations for the Split branch of the Croatian Association for Visual Arts were laid with the artistic efforts of an underground group that opposed fascist exhibitions during the Second World War. After the war, the Association became the main cultural force in Split, organizing traditional exhibitions like the annual May Day exhibitions.

On November 22, 1945, the cultural and scientific workers of the Ivan Lozica Society established a special association of Dalmatian visual artists, known today as HULU Split. In February 1946, the association organized its first group exhibition. It opened on May 1, 1946, in Salon Galić, and continued yearly on the same date and place, under the name of May Day (Prvomajske izložbe).

In 1946, the same members of the Ivan Lozica Society founded an evening school dedicated to educating attendees on the practical pieces of knowledge of the artistic process, which matured in the School of Applied Art of Split.

In 1951, HULU was granted a permanent exhibition space in the House of Culture, and later in Krešimir Street. In the decades that came, it was entrusted to manage significant public spaces including the Protiron on the south of the peristyle in Diocletian's Palace, the crypt under the Cathedral of Saint Domnius, Diocletian's cellars and the Kula Gallery with art-based events. Other prominent spaces that the association handled count the Fine Arts Gallery, the Archaeological Museum and the Museum of the People's Revolution.

Ivan Galić confided his exhibitional space to HULU in his will, and it has managed Salon Galić since 1961. It has hosted over a thousand exhibitions there since, and ensured Salon Galić as an enduring and relevant artistic destination in Croatia.

In 1969, the Association launched today one of the most important art happenings in Croatia, the Split Salon. As artistic pluralism started becoming a hallmark of the contemporary art scene, colourful and eclectic principles mirrored numerous mid-sixties efforts anchored by HULU Split, like the Youth Salon (1973), the Biennale of Contemporary Croatian Graphics (1974), and the Small Formats Biennale (1977).

At the end of the seventies, HULU became an independent society called the Croatian Society of Fine Artists, and three years later, in December 1982 a social organization. A move estimating the budding need in Split to court tourism is the Diocletian Sales Gallery, promoting art for tourists, for which the Association was instrumental in opening during the eighties.

The exhibition corpus between 1945 and 1992 was the subject of a notable study conducted by the then-president of the exhibitional branch of the association Duško Kečkemet in 2000 titled Likovne izložbe u Splitu 1945-1992.

In 2022, HULU Split organised a charitable manifestation, in conjunction with the cultural association of Ukrainians in Croatia Cvit, with its member's paintings up for auction that raised 125,000 Croatian kuna (around 16,000 euros) for Ukraine.

== Awards and accolades ==
The Association's objectives include the promotion of the Croatian visual arts scene, the advocation for artistic freedom and continuous progress, public education, the presentation of the Croatian visual artistic contributions on both a local and international level and the protection of the independent artists' moral and material rights. Successful in its ambitions, HULU Split received numerous accolades and distinctions.

HULU was awarded, alongside the Zagreb-based visual arts association HDLU the title of a national professional association and received numerous other local and national merits. Those include the Split City Coat of Arms Award for Outstanding Achievements and Contributions of Significant Importance to the Development and Reputation of the City of Split, an accolade of Special Interest by the Split-Dalmatia County Council and the Honorary Award for its long-standing link with the Croatian Community of Independent Artists.

It has also been recognised for its humanitarian work, receiving praise for hosting artists' contributions during the Croatian War of Independence through the activities of the ART guard unit of the Association of Croatian Artists Split, and a charitable art auction featuring its members paintings that it had organised to raise funds for the needs of the Children's Clinic at KBC Split.

== Partners and collaborators ==
HULU Split has collaborated with other cultural institutions including the Center for Culture and Lifelong Learning Porta Aurea in the Loggia Gallery, the Faculty of Philosophy through the REPER project, the City Museum of Split and Zoja Dumengjić Gallery in the city's Clinical Hospital Center. National partners include the Zlatna Vrata Center (the Porta Aurea Center), and the Institute of Contemporary Art, Zagreb, with whom they organize the prestigious Radoslav Putar Award Ceremony.
