= Arnold Sodeman =

Australian serial killer

Arnold Karl Sodeman
- Born: 12 December 1899; Hawthorn, Victoria, Australia
- Died: 1 June 1936 (aged 36); HM Prison Pentridge, Coburg, Victoria, Australia
- Other name: The School-Girl Strangler
- Spouse: Bernice (née Pope)
- Children: 1
- Status: Executed by hanging
- Conviction: Murder
- Penalty: Death

Details
- Victims: 4
- Span of crimes: 1930–1935
- Country: Australia
- State: Victoria

Arnold Karl Sodeman (12 December 1899 – 1 June 1936), also known as the School-girl Strangler, was an Australian serial killer who targeted children. He confessed to four killings, and was executed at Pentridge Prison in 1936. Sodeman was the second of eleven people to be hanged at Pentridge Prison after the closure of Melbourne Gaol in 1924.

== Early life ==
Arnold Karl Sodeman was born in Victoria in 1899. His mother suffered from bouts of amnesia and both his father and grandfather died in mental institutions. At 18, Sodeman was sent to a reformatory prison for larceny. Shortly after his release from the reformatory, he was charged with armed robbery and wounding the station master at Surrey Hills railway station. Sodeman was sent to prison to serve three years hard labour. Sodeman escaped from prison and was sentenced to a further 12 months imprisonment with hard labour.

Upon release Sodeman settled down to various labouring jobs, first in Melbourne and later in Gippsland. He married Bernice Pope at Collingwood and their daughter Joan was born in 1928. The marriage was considered a happy one. Although Sodeman seemed to suffer from occasional bouts of depression and frequent drunkenness, he was never violent towards his family. He was reported to be hard-working, mild and amiable with a generous disposition.

== Murders and arrest ==
On 9 November 1930 Sodeman abducted a 12-year-old schoolgirl, Mena Griffiths. He came upon his victim at the local playground playing with a group of friends. He gave the other girls some money and told them to go to the shop to get some ice-creams; meanwhile, he told his victim that he had a different errand for her to run. By the time the little girl's friends returned to the playground, there was no sign of Griffiths or the man. Griffiths' body was discovered two days later at Ormond, in an abandoned building. She had been strangled to death, then gagged and bound post-mortem with her own clothing.

On 10 January 1931 he abducted 16-year-old Hazel Wilson and strangled her to death. Her body was also found in the suburb of Ormond. Again, in a signature move, he had gagged and tied her hands behind her back with portions of her clothing.

Sodeman struck for the third time on 1 January 1935. His victim Ethel Belshaw was a 12-year-old girl whom he strangled then bound at the sea-side town of Inverloch. Belshaw was intending to buy an ice cream when she disappeared.

On 1 December 1935 Sodeman killed his fourth victim, a 6-year-old girl named June Rushmer, the daughter of a coworker who was taken from a local park. Her body was found the following day less than 2 kilometres (1.2 mi) from her Leongatha home. She had also been bound, gagged and strangled. Witnesses stated that they had seen the child with a man on a bicycle shortly before her disappearance.

Sodeman at the time was on a work crew repairing roadways. During a morning tea break a fellow worker jokingly stated he had seen Sodeman on his bike near the crime scene. Sodeman replied angrily that he wasn't there. He had answered with such anger and rage, which was very out of character for him, that the workers told police. Police took him away for questioning and he quickly confessed to the crimes. Police were initially skeptical of the confession, but Sodeman gave details of the crimes that only someone present could have known.

== Inquest and trial ==
The court house at Leongatha was crowded when the Rushmer inquest commenced. The government pathologist Dr. Mollison said that the dead girl's hands were tied behind her back with a piece of cloth and a bloodstained garment was pushed into her mouth. A piece of torn sock was tied around her neck. The body bore bruises. Death, he thought, was due to suffocation.

Nancy Viola Smith, aged 12 said that she played with Rushmer on the Leongatha Reserve and that Rushmer left the park at 7.15 p.m. William Henry Money of Leongatha said that at 7.15 p.m. he saw Sodeman riding his bicycle in the direction of the reserve. Sodeman had a strange look on his face and the witness thought it peculiar. Sodeman did not speak to him. Vincent Desmond Ryan of Leongatha said that between 7.15 and 7.30 p.m. he saw a man with a little girl on the front of his cycle. The child was similar in build to Rushmer, but the witness was 80 metres (90 yards) away and could not see him properly.

Senior Detective O'Keefe said that Detective Delminico was with Sodeman when he stated:

"I saw June Rushmer on the footpath walking towards her home near the tennis court and she said, 'Give us a ride.' I knew her and she knew me. I agreed, and rode down the stock route and turned down the road leading to the sanitary depot. About 90 metres (100 yards) from the corner, she said, 'This is far enough.' I got off the bike and said 'You can walk home.' I made a run towards her and she ran into the bush. I ran after her, and caught her round the neck, and she started to scream. I held her by the neck and she went limp all of a sudden. I then took off her bloomers and jammed them into her mouth. I got a belt from her frock and tied it over her mouth and round the back of her neck."

Sodeman was then committed for trial by the coroner. In February 1936, at the conclusion of a two-day trial, the jury found him guilty of murder. The Government medical officer Dr. A. J. W. Philpott, his assistant, Dr. R. T. Allan, and a psychiatrist Dr Reginald Ellery, all gave evidence that Sodeman was suffering from a disorder of the mind which created an 'obsessional impulse' of such power that—under the influence of alcohol—he was no longer responsible for his behaviour. Since Sodeman was intoxicated on all four occasions, the doctors concluded that he was insane at the times of the murders. Their conclusion was reinforced not only by Sodeman's repetitive behaviour but also by his family's medical history: both his father and grandfather had died insane. Judge Charles Gavan Duffy then sentenced him to death for the murder of Rushmer having advised the jury to distinguish between opinions given by expert medical witnesses on matters relating to the physical body, which could be proved by surgery, and those concerning the mind. The jury, in making their decision, rejected Sodeman's defence of insanity.

== Appeals ==
An extract from The Argus, on Friday 24 April 1936, read:

"An English King's Counsel has now been engaged to plead the case before the Judicial Committee of the Privy Council of Arnold Sodeman, who has been condemned to death for the murder of June Rushmer at Leongatha. Sodeman's solicitor (Mr. C H. Auty) said yesterday that he had arranged by cable message for Mr D. N Pritt, K C, a leading Kings Counsel, and a member of the House of Commons, to appear for Sodeman in the proposed application by him for special leave to appeal against the refusal of the High Court of Australia to grant him special leave to appeal against his conviction. Mr Auty said that his agents in London would instruct Mr. Pritt and another barrister, who would act as Mr Pritt's Junior, regarding the details of the application. Meanwhile, Mr. Auty has addressed a written request to the Premier Mr. Dunstan) that the Government should grant a further reprieve to Sodeman until such time as the condemned man's application to the Privy Council has been determined Mr Auty said yesterday that he was now 'preparing the petition for special leave to appeal and other necessary documents. He expected that those documents would be ready in time to be despatched to England next week'. One of the documents which must shortly go forward to London is an affidavit in support of the application. This must be signed by Sodeman, whose present reprieve expires on May 4, for which day the execution has been fixed. It is expected that the Executive Council will grant the reprieve now asked for by Mr. Auty. It is expected that a report will be received from the Crown Law Department next week, and if the Cabinet decides that the request should be granted the necessary action will be taken immediately by the Executive Council. Sodeman's appeal against his conviction was unsuccessful. The grounds of the appeal were: (1) that the learned trial Judge wrongly admitted evidence, namely, the evidence of the deaths of Mena Griffiths, Hazel Wilson, and Ethel Belshaw; (2) that the learned trial judge misdirected the jury (a) as to the onus of proof in a case of insanity, (b) as to the requirements of the law in relation to insanity, and (c) as to the law relating to drink, insanity, and manslaughter; and (3) that the prosecution and the learned trial Judge made comments on the failure of the accused to give evidence."

== Execution ==
Sodeman had not wanted a reprieve because of the fear that if he lived he might commit more murders. Sodeman spent a good deal of his time playing draughts with Edward Cornelius, who was under sentence of death for the murder of Reverend Cecil in Fitzroy in November of the previous year. He was hanged and buried at Pentridge Prison, Coburg, on 1 June 1936. An autopsy disclosed that he was suffering from leptomeningitis, a degenerative disease that could cause serious inflammation of the brain when aggravated by alcohol.

== Media ==
In 1965 the Australian television series Homicide based episode 39 "A Lonely Place" on the case. The episode first went to air in November 1965 and was introduced by actor John Fegan, warning of the importance of protecting children. Unlike many episodes, the episode ended without a voice over stating what the legal results of the case had been (for example, whether the offender was sentenced to death but later reprieved).

On the seventy-fifth anniversary of the murder of Ethel Belshaw, Leongatha newspaper ‘’’The Great Southern Star’’’ published an interview with Maureen Lewis (née Keighery) who was the Sodeman's neighbour in 1935. Lewis was with the Sodeman family on the day he murdered Belshaw. Lewis had travelled with the Sodemans from Leongatha for a fun day in the sun. She was friends with the Sodemans’ child Joan, a girl of similar age. “On the day Ethel was murdered. He wanted to take me for an ice cream. It could have been me that day,” she said. “I went down there with them to Inverloch on that day with the Sodemans. ... He wanted to take me for an ice cream, and Mrs Sodeman wouldn’t let him take me, unless he also took Joan, his daughter.” (which Sodeman refused to do).

== See also ==
- List of serial killers by country
- Volunteer (capital punishment)
