= Herbie Taylor (footballer) =

Australian rules footballer

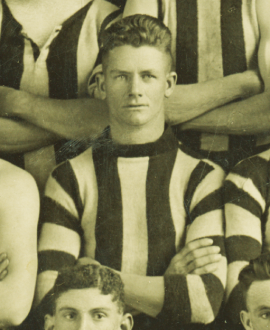
- Taylor in 1923

Personal information
- Full name: Herbert Kitchener Richard Taylor
- Born: 30 January 1899; Abbotsford, Victoria
- Died: 31 May 1972 (aged 73); Caulfield South, Victoria
- Original team: Collingwood District
- Height: 168 cm (5 ft 6 in)
- Weight: 65 kg (143 lb)

Playing career^{1}
Years	Club	Games (Goals)
1923	Collingwood	5 (5)
- ^{1} Playing statistics correct to the end of 1923.

Herbert Kitchener Richard Taylor (30 January 1899 – 31 May 1972) was an Australian rules footballer who played with Collingwood in the Victorian Football League (VFL).
