= Jack Forty =

Australian rules footballer, born 1906

Personal information
- Full name: John Charles Forty
- Born: 7 March 1906; Clifton Hill, Victoria
- Died: 17 July 1928 (aged 22); Glen Huntly, Victoria
- Original team: Belgrave
- Height: 177 cm (5 ft 10 in)
- Weight: 77 kg (170 lb)

Playing career^{1}
Years	Club	Games (Goals)
1927	St Kilda	7 (1)
- ^{1} Playing statistics correct to the end of 1927.

John Charles Forty (7 March 1906 – 17 July 1928) was an Australian rules footballer who played with St Kilda in the Victorian Football League (VFL).

== Family ==
The son of William Forty (1877–1967), and Lucy Forty (1877–1960), née Pollock, John Charles Forty was born in Clifton Hill, Victoria on 7 March 1906.

== Football ==
He was cleared from Belgrave to St Kilda in April 1927.

== Death ==
He died at his father's residence in Glen Huntly, Victoria on 17 July 1928.
