= Norm Hallett =

Australian rules footballer

Personal information
- Full name: Norman Crawford Hallett
- Born: 5 March 1894; Elsternwick, Victoria
- Died: 30 April 1961 (aged 67); Glen Huntly, Victoria
- Original team: Woodend

Playing career^{1}
Years	Club	Games (Goals)
1919–20	St Kilda	16 (9)
- ^{1} Playing statistics correct to the end of 1920.

Norman Crawford Hallett (5 March 1894 – 30 April 1961) was an Australian rules footballer who played with St Kilda in the Victorian Football League (VFL).
