= Caulfield, Victoria =

Caulfield
- Suburb
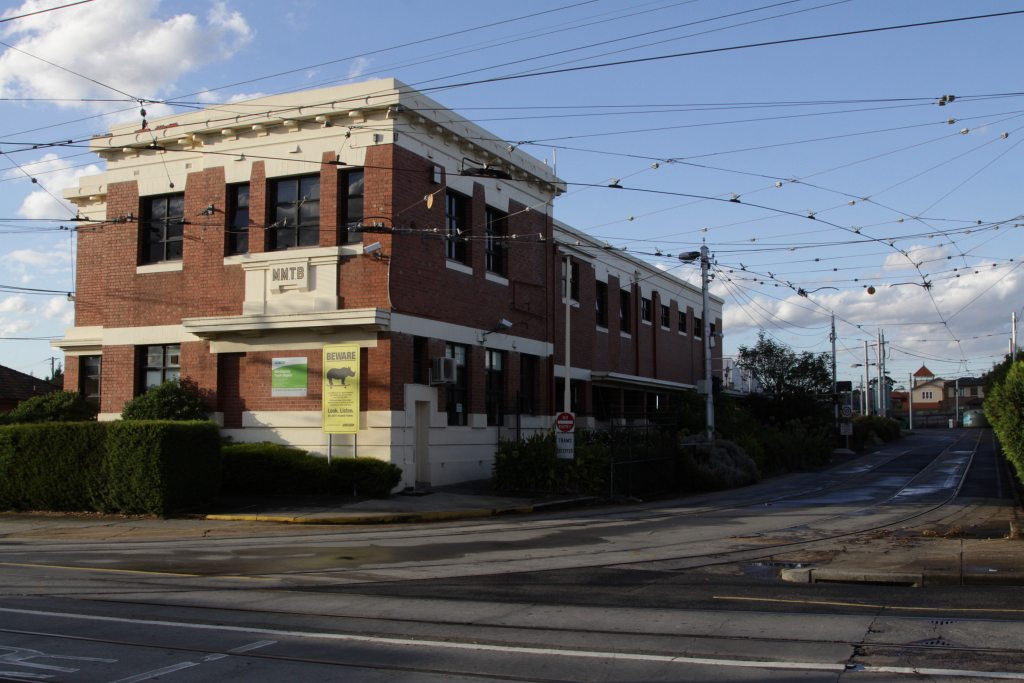
- Glenhuntly tram depot is located in Caulfield

- Interactive map of Caulfield
- Coordinates: 37.8840°S 145.0266°E
- Country: Australia
- State: Victoria
- City: Melbourne
- LGA: City of Glen Eira
- Location: 10 km (6.2 mi) from Melbourne

Government
  - State electorate: Caulfield
  - Federal division: Macnamara

Area
  - Total: 1.5 km^{2} (0.58 sq mi)
- Elevation: 38 m (125 ft)

Population
  - Total: 5,748 (2021 census)
  - Density: 3,830/km^{2} (9,900/sq mi)
- Postcode: 3162
Suburbs around Caulfield
Caulfield North	Caulfield North	Caulfield East
Elsternwick	Caulfield	Caulfield East
Elsternwick	Caulfield South	Glen Huntly

Caulfield is a suburb in Melbourne, Victoria, Australia, 10 kilometres (6.2 mi) south-east of Melbourne's Central Business District, located within the City of Glen Eira local government area. Caulfield recorded a population of 5,748 at the 2021 census.

It is bounded by Kooyong Road in the west, Glen Eira Road in the north, Glen Huntly Road in the south and Booran Road in the east.

Major landmarks in the suburb of Caulfield include the Glenhuntly tram depot and Caulfield Hospital.

== History ==
=== Toponymy ===
The origin of the name of Caulfield is not known for certain, but the name seemed to be linked with Baron Caulfield of Ireland, perhaps through John Caulfield, a pioneer of the colony. The name Caulfield was in use by 1853, and the early maps always place it somewhere around the racecourse.

=== Pre-European history ===
The local Yalukit people were coastal and dependent on seafoods, so few Aboriginal relics have been found in Caulfield. Nevertheless, some contact did occur in the area between Aboriginals and British settlers. Murrum Murrumbean was a local native from whom the placename Murrumbeena derives. Frederick Chapman (later Justice of the New Zealand Supreme Court) was able to recollect a corroboree which took place in Hotham Street, involving hundreds of Gippsland Aboriginals.

=== Establishment ===
In the mid nineteenth century, the Caulfield area was swampy, low-lying ground. It served as watering and pasture land for the pastoralists driving stock from Gippsland to Melbourne. In the 1840s, several distinct communities had arisen throughout the area. Owensville was located around the western end of Glen Eira Road. Alma Road Village was another middle class area further north. Camden Town was a working class area at the junction of Glen Huntly and Hawthorn Roads. Meanwhile, the area south of Paddy's Swamp (now Caulfield Park) developed into the main commercial area of Caulfield. Initially the Black Chapel at that point served as the area's first church. This building was soon converted to Boxill's general store. The whole area was proclaimed the Caulfield Road District in 1857. It served as a location for several grand mansions for wealthy Melbourne citizens over the following decades. Caulfield Post Office opened on 1 January 1863 and closed in 1974. Caulfield Junction Post Office opened in 1923 and remains open.

== Population ==
Historical population
Year	Pop.	±%
2001	4,857	—
2006	4,790	−1.4%
2011	5,160	+7.7%
2016	5,595	+8.4%
2021	5,748	+2.7%

At the 2016 census, Caulfield had a population of 5,595. 53.0% of people were born in Australia. The most common countries of birth were South Africa 5.4%, China 3.3%, Israel 3.0%, Poland 2.8% and England 2.3%. 63.1% of people only spoke English at home. Other languages spoken at home included Russian 6.0%, Hebrew 4.1%, Greek 3.8% and Mandarin 3.4%. The most common responses for religion in Caulfield were Judaism 40.5%, No Religion 21.6% and Catholic 10.5%.

== Parks and open space ==
Caulfield Park, which is nearby in Caulfield North, is a large (approximately 26 hectare) Victorian garden flanked by Hawthorn, Balaclava and Inkerman Roads and Park Crescent, which features a war memorial, a decorative lake and playing fields for various sports.

== Transport ==
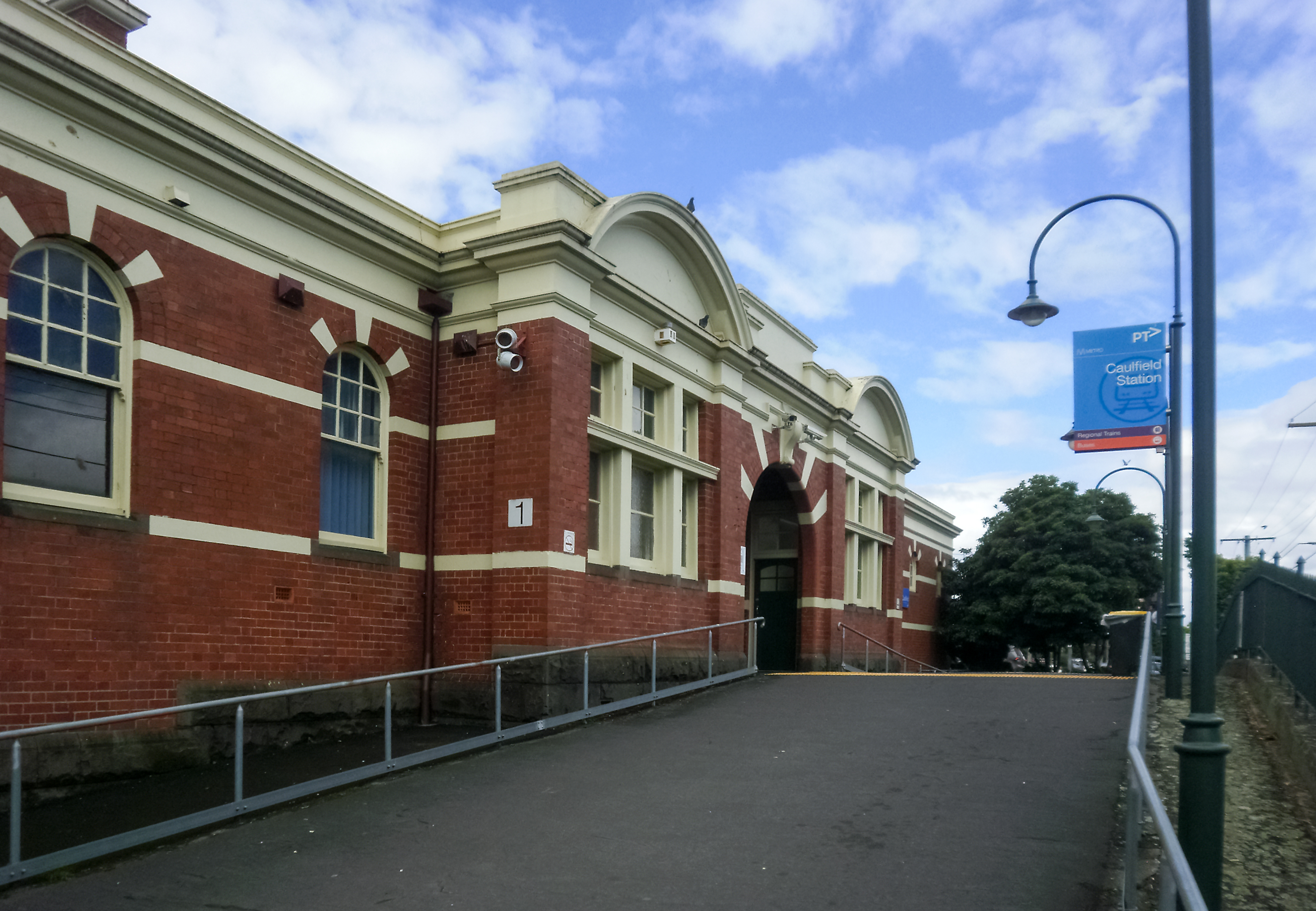
Caulfield train Station entrance

The principal north–south roads that serve the suburb are Kooyong Road, Hawthorn Road, Bambra Road, Kambrook Road, and Booran Road. The major east–west roads are Glen Eira Road, Neerim Road, and Glen Huntly Road.

Two tram routes serve the suburb;

- Route 64 – Melbourne University to Brighton East; travels along Hawthorn Road
- Route 67 – Melbourne University to Carnegie; travels along Glen Huntly Road

Three bus routes serve the suburb;

- 605 – Flagstaff station to Gardenvale; travels along Kooyong Road
- 623 – Glen Waverley station to St Kilda; travels along Neerim Road, Booran Road, and Glen Eira Road
- 624 – Kew to Oakleigh station; travels along Booran Road

No railway lines serve the suburb, with the closest stations being on the Cranbourne, Frankston, Pakenham, and Sandringham lines.

Stations in the neighbouring suburbs of Caulfield East, Elsternwick and Glen Huntly;

- Caulfield station; in Caulfield East, on the Cranbourne, Frankston, and Pakenham lines
- Elsternwick station; in Elsternwick, on the Sandringham line
- Glen Huntly station; in Glen Huntly, on the Frankston line

== Sport ==
The suburb has an Australian Rules football team competing in the Southern Football League, known as the Bears.

== Education ==
There is a primary school, Caulfield Primary School, with a bilingual English-Japanese program. In 2019, admissions were limited to those in its catchment zone.

== Notable residents ==
- Warwick Armstrong, cricket captain, grew up next to Caulfield Park
- Marjorie Buckingham, novelist and children's writer, minister at the Church of Christ, Bamra Road, Caulfield
- Deborah Conway, musician
- Clarrie Grimmett, Australian cricketer
- Michael Gudinski, music executive and promoter
- Ella Hooper, lead singer of Killing Heidi
- Graham Kennedy, TV personality
- Violet Mount, operatic soprano
- Darby Munro, jockey
- Bill Ponsford, cricketer, moved to South Caulfield from Elsternwick

== See also ==
- City of Caulfield – Caulfield was previously within this former local government area.
