= Kew Cottages =

Heritage-listed school and residences in Melbourne, Victoria, Australia

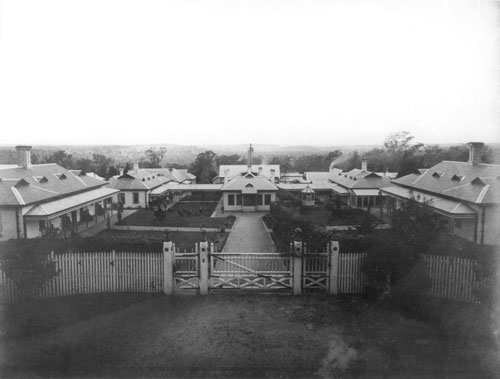
- The cottages, c. 1900; photo by Nicholas Caire

- Location of the cottages in Greater Metropolitan Melbourne

Geography
- Location: Kew Asylum, Kew, City of Boroondara, Melbourne, Victoria, Australia
- Coordinates: 37°47′51″S 145°1′36″E

Organisation
- Care system: Public Medicare (AU)
- Type: Former asylum and development school for children

History
- Former name: Kew Idiot Asylum
- Constructed: 1885–1887
- Opened: May 1887; 139 years ago
- Closed: April 2008

Links
- Lists: Hospitals in Australia
- Building details
- Alternative names: Kew Children's Cottages; Kew Cottages Training Centre; Kew Residential Services

General information
- Status: Completed
- Type: Cottages / Hospital wards (1887–2008); Community housing residential units (since 2008)
- Architectural style: Victorian (1887); Modernist (2008)
- Renovated: 1930s; 1950s; 1970s; 2008
- Owner: Government of Victoria

Technical details
- Size: 20 community houses
- Grounds: 27 ha (67 acres)

Renovating team
- Renovating firm: DKO (2008)
- Main contractor: Walker Corporation (developer)
- Awards: UDI Best Urban Renewal (2012); UDI Best Overall Development (2012); UDI Best Overall Development (2008)

Site notes
- Website: kewcottageshistory.com.au

Victorian Heritage Register
- Official name: Former Kew Cottages (Kew Residential Services)
- Type: Registered place
- Reference no.: VHR H2073
- Heritage overlay no.: HO485
- Categories: Health Services; Parks, Gardens and Trees; Education

The Kew Cottages, also known as Kew Children's Cottages and finally as Kew Residential Services, is a decommissioned special development school and residential service located adjacent to the former Kew Asylum, in Kew, in the City of Boroondara, in the inner eastern suburbs of Melbourne, in Victoria, Australia.

The function of the institution was to provide accommodation and educational instruction for intellectually disabled children. Some wards of the state and other various "difficult" children were also admitted. The institution opened in May 1887 as the Kew Idiot Asylum and was the first government institution to be established for intellectually handicapped children in Australia. Following a royal commission into the standard of care at the institution, the model of care and the physical site was significantly altered from the 1930s to the 1970s. The school operated from c. 1929 until 1991. A fire resulted in the death of nine residents in 1996 and the resultant inquest led to improvements in fire safety standards for residential institutions throughout Victoria. The surrounding grounds were redeveloped as a residential estate from the early 2000s; and the institution was closed in April 2008 and subsequently decommissioned.

From 2005 through to 2008, the 27-hectare (67-acre) site was progressively redeveloped as a low-density, high-quality residential estate that integrated community housing with private housing, and extensive public open space. Three historic buildings were restored.

Built from 1885 on the traditional lands of the Wurundjeri people, the remnant cottages were added to the Victorian Heritage Register on 11 March 2004 in recognition of their architectural, historical, aesthetic, scientific (horticultural), and social significance; and were also added to a non-statutory list by the Victorian branch of the National Trust on 23 August 2005.

== Site description ==
The former Kew Cottages initially consisted of three cottages, a school house, and kitchen constructed between 1885 and 1887 to the east of the Kew Asylum. The present buildings stand in extensive grounds with avenues of oaks lining the internal roads and mature plantings between the buildings.

The surviving buildings at the site include two of the three cottages built in 1887 – known as Unit 10 and House Hostel. The original school house (also known as the parent's retreat and/or chapel) was built at the same time. A further cottage (Unit 11) was built in 1891 and was also altered. The ward, known as Unit 9, was built as the female ward and dates from 1898–1900. A separate dining room, known as the STAD building, was built in 1917. The site deteriorated dramatically in the first half of the twentieth century, with severe overcrowding and lack of maintenance.

Units 9, 10, 11 and the House Hostel were significantly altered and extended over many years. The three cottages and the female ward were updated in the wave of reform initiated by Dr Eric Cunningham Dax AO, the first Chairman of the Mental Hygiene Authority of Victoria, (Note: Later known as the Mental Health Authority of Victoria.) in the 1950s, and many of the changes made to these buildings reflect this era; and again in the 1970s. The School House and the Dining Room are relatively intact although used for various purposes over the years.

Between 2005 and 2008, the 27-hectare (67-acre) (Note: DKO stated that the site comprised 37 ha (91 acres); however, all other sources state that the site comprises 27 ha (67 acres).) site was sold to Walker Corporation who engaged DKO Architects to integrate the historical facilities with twenty new community homes and a further 280 private dwellings, completed in a Modernist style. The project created community houses for the one hundred residents who were living on the site with intellectual disabilities that were integrated among private dwellings, which included an apartment complex and the restoration and sale of three heritage buildings. A further 73 off-site houses were delivered as part of the project by the Department of Families, Fairness and Housing to support 380 former residents of the Kew Cottages. However, the development did encounter some community opposition and development concerns.

== Kew Idiot Asylum history ==
Australian Asylums
Kew Idiot Asylum
Location:	Kew, Victoria
Status:	Decommissioned and site redeveloped
Classification:	Idiot/Imbecile asylum for children
Capacity:	c. 500 – c. 600
Opened:	May 1887
Closed:	April 2008

=== Background ===
The Children's Cottages at Kew were first opened in 1887 as the "Idiot Ward" of Kew Asylum. In the early days of the establishment of the Asylum, there was little between "lunatics" and "idiots" (or "imbeciles"). Therefore, many wards of the state, "difficult" children, and children with an intellectual disability were housed with the adults at the Kew Asylum. By 1879 nearly 600 children, represented a quarter of all inmates, were accommodated in various adult institutions in Victoria. In the 1880s the government decided that a separate building should be built to accommodate child inmates. The Zox Commission recommended the Yarra Bend Asylum site as appropriate for buildings for "imbecile" children. However, a site was chosen between the main Asylum building and the Asylum entrance gates; and in 1885 a contract was let for the erection of cottage units.

The children's cottages were established to provide separate accommodation for child inmates who had previously been housed with adult patients. Although the Cottages only admitted children as patients, many of them remained in residence at the Cottages as adults. Shortly after opening, the Idiot Ward began functioning separately from the Kew Asylum, and became known as the Kew Idiot Asylum from May 1887 until c. 1929. Although the Idiot Asylum only admitted children, many of those children remained in residence at the Cottages as adults.

=== Reginald Ellery ===
In May 1923, a young and inexperienced Reginald Spencer Ellery was appointed as a junior medical officer at the Kew Asylum. Nine months later, he was transferred to the Kew Idiot Asylum as its medical officer. Appalled at the conditions he witnessed there, he endeavoured to make improvements in the institution and the treatment of its patients. For example, owing to the extant health risks, he sought to destroy bug-infested furniture, much to the displeasure of his superiors and colleagues.

Ellery's attempts at improving conditions at Kew Cottages were seen by the general medical staff as a threat to the comfort of their settled routines. Nurses and attendants met informally, together and separately, in order to elicit from one another information which could be formed into the basis of a complaint of cruelty and maladministration against Dr Ellery. They did so not out of concern for the interests of the patients, but with a view to displacing Dr Ellery from his position. An anonymous letter was sent to the Inspector-General of the Insane, Dr W. Ernest Jones, setting out these complaints, and the nurses and attendants wrote to the secretary of the Victorian Branch of the Hospital Employees' Association, requesting that the association press Dr Jones to conduct an inquiry. He did so in August 1924, finding no evidence to substantiate the allegations.

In July 1924, the Prendergast ministry had been elected in Victoria, and had strong ties to the Hospital Employees' Association. Moreover, members of the press and politicians received information leaks regarding the matter. The new government had instituted three royal commissions in its short tenure, and with that, Ellery became the first psychiatrist in Australia to have his activities examined by a royal commission.

=== Royal commission ===
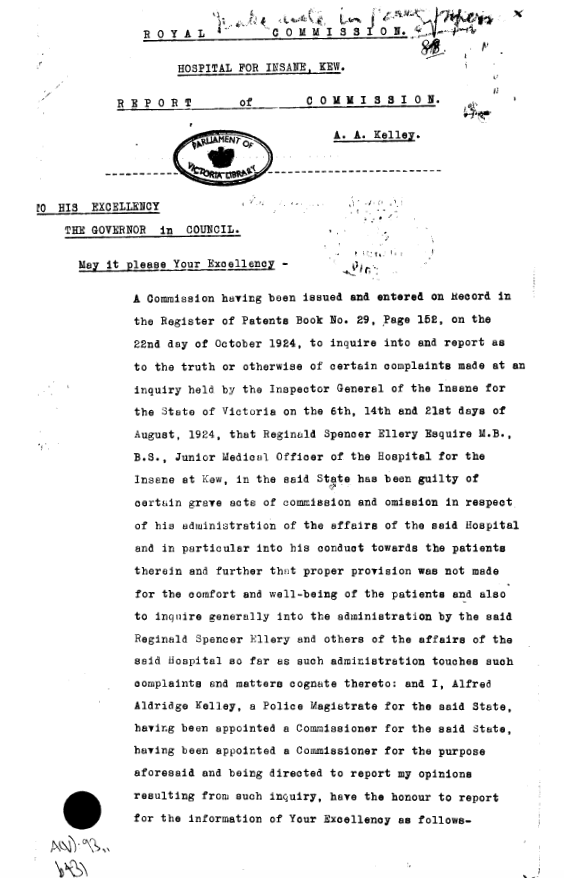
Front page of the royal commission's report

The Royal Commission into the Hospital for Insane, Kew was a royal commission held in Victoria in November 1924. Alfred Aldridge Kelley was appointed as the sole commissioner on 22 October 1924 by the Prendergast Labor government. Despite the title, the commission was charged to inquire into certain allegations made by nurses and attendants of cruelty and maladministration against Reginald Spencer Ellery, the junior medical officer at Idiot Asylum, and was unrelated to the Kew Hospital for the Insane. The royal commission was held between 5 and 19 November, 1924. The association was represented by Mr F. Brennan, and Ellery was represented by future prime minister Robert Menzies.

==== Terms of reference ====
The royal commission was specifically charged with inquiring into the truth or otherwise of a number of allegations made against Dr Ellery, being that he:

1. Extracted teeth from patients without good and sufficient cause in front of other patients, and allowed nurses to do the same.
2. Catheterised a number of male and female patients solely for the purposes of demonstrating the appropriate technique to the nurses, the patients having no medical requirement for such a procedure.
3. Gave medically unnecessary injections of apomorphine, bacillus coli vaccine, and glucose solution, to a number of patients in unsuitable conditions in respect of hygiene, privacy, and decorum.
4. As a result of his maladministration, subjected patients to undue hardship from cold or wet conditions, and subjected some crippled patients to open-air bathing at times or in circumstances calculated to inflict undue hardship or suffering or to endanger health.
5. Permitted or required patients to remain unduly long in unclean or wet clothing or conditions.
6. Permitted improper or indecorous intermingling of male and female patients.
7. Permitted female patients to be inside the male dormitory unattended and in sight of male patients or otherwise in an indecorous or undesirable manner.
8. Brought intoxicating liquor into the institution, or permitted other persons to do so, contrary to regulations.
9. Told female staff members improper or indecent stories.

Additionally, the commission was required to make a finding as to whether there was any evidence of a conspiracy on the part of the staff against Dr Ellery.

==== Findings ====
Kelley found that the tooth extractions, catheterisations, and injections were conducted with good and sufficient cause. However, he found that Ellery should not have extracted teeth in front of other patients, nor allowed nurses to extract teeth from patients. He also found that it was inappropriate in all circumstances to catheterise patients for demonstration purposes, although this practice was known and endorsed by Ellery's superiors, who considered it his duty to provide demonstrations of and training regarding certain medical procedures to nurses on request.

The allegations regarding the wet and cold conditions of the institution and the clothing issued to patients were found to be caused by circumstances not within Dr Ellery's responsibility, and, in any case, a state of affairs well preceding his appointment. The allegation regarding open-air bathing was found to be an appropriate and temporary arrangement during bathroom renovations, however Ellery was criticised for not arranging curtains for the protection of bathing patients. No evidence was put forth to substantiate the allegations relating to male-female intermingling and the presence of intoxicating liquor. The allegation that Dr Ellery told female staff improper or indecent stories was not proved because of a lack of evidence and the unavailability of the person to whom the stories were allegedly told.

Kelley, however, made criticisms of Dr Ellery which did not arise directly from the allegations, but which were rather "cognate matters". Such criticisms include that he should not have used chloroform to subdue a patient unwilling to undergo an otherwise legitimate and proper blood test, and that he should not have force-fed a patient solely for the purpose of demonstrating the appropriate technique to nurses.

===== Conspiracy against Dr Ellery =====
Kelley said that there was insufficient evidence for him to find the existence of a conspiracy within the meaning of the criminal law, however, he found that:

1. There was an agreement amongst the staff to give accounts of certain events which were helpful to the furtherance of the complaints.
2. None of the staff present during the events complained of made known any complaint at the time of its occurrence.
3. Some time after all of the relevant events, informal meetings were held amongst staff in order to discuss and formulate allegations to be made against Dr Ellery.
4. The attitude of the nurses and attendants through the course of the royal commission changed from "more or less unconcern for the patients to a vigorous attack on Dr Ellery".
5. Attendants O'Grady, Roper, Myers, McDuff, and Sheehan all gave untruthful evidence to the commission, concocted to further the effect of their complaints against Dr Ellery, and did so knowing, due to their long service, that Dr Ellery was not responsible for many of the matters complained of.
6. There was no evidence whatever of any act of cruelty wilfully and deliberately practised by Dr Ellery on any patient.
7. The complaints were motivated by animosity and intended to displace Dr Ellery from his position.

==== Aftermath ====
The Argus reported on 27 November 1924 Ellery's "vindication" at the royal commission. However, the impact of the commission on Ellery's life was substantial. Despite his supposed exoneration, he was left with significant legal expenses which were not paid by the government. Following the royal commission, Ellery was transferred to Sunbury Asylum, a relatively rural location at the time.

== Redevelopments and subsequent closure ==
From 1929 the institution became known as the "Children's Cottages, Kew" or alternatively "Kew Cottages Training Centre"; and then finally as "Kew Residential Services". In about 1929, the Department of Education established the Kew Cottages Special School (State School 4431). It was the first school in Victoria for children with intellectual disabilities. The school remained in operation until the end of 1991.

During the 1950s, Dr Cunningham Dax, with the support of a media campaign launched by journalist E. W. (Bill) Tipping in The Herald, brought the issue of overcrowding and poor conditions of the Cottages to the community's attention. The Herald promoted the Kew Cottages Appeal in 1953 that raised £47,798. The first £10,000 was spent on modern plumbing, new kitchens, refrigeration and renovations to the original cottages. Four H-shaped dormitory blocks based on models seen by Dax in The Netherlands were built in 1958. A new ward (Ward 13) was completed in 1960, as was the Geiger Playhouse. In 1957, the administration of Kew Cottages was separated from that of the Kew Mental Hospital; and in 1962 the Cottages were proclaimed as a training centre under the Mental Health Act (VIC), 1959. In 1985, oversight of the institution was transferred form the Health portfolio to Community Services Victoria.

In 1973, the Minus Children Appeal was initiated by Graham Perkin, the editor of The Age. Over 500 children were on the waiting list for places at Kew Cottages at that time. As a result of the appeal, four major buildings were constructed in this period to cater for daytime activities and education and named the Hamer Centre for daily activities, the Smorgon Centre for medical and dental centre, the Perkin Art Centre, and The Age/Geiger Centre for drama and as a kindergarten, which incorporated the 1950s Geiger Playhouse.

In April 1996, nine residents, all men and aged from 30 to 40, died in a fire. The two cottages, with a shared roof, had housed 25 people at the time of the fire. A subsequent Coronial inquest found that despite the fire being deliberately lit by a resident, the ward door was locked without a sprinkler system or an adequate alarm system; and that the Victorian Government failed to ensure that the building met fire safety standards. A memorial to the men was established on the site. The inquest findings resulted in safer accommodation and care for vulnerable members of the community.

In 2001, the Victorian Government announced its intention to close Kew Cottages and the former Kew Asylum grounds were redeveloped from 2005 to October 2006; and faced opposition including a significant community-driven campaign. The institution was finally closed in April 2008, when the last one hundred residents moved into new homes on the site.

== See also ==
- Architecture of Melbourne
- Housing in Victoria, Australia
- List of Australian psychiatric institutions
- List of places on the Victorian Heritage Register in the City of Boroondara
