= William Ernest Jones (psychiatrist) =

English-Australian psychiatrist

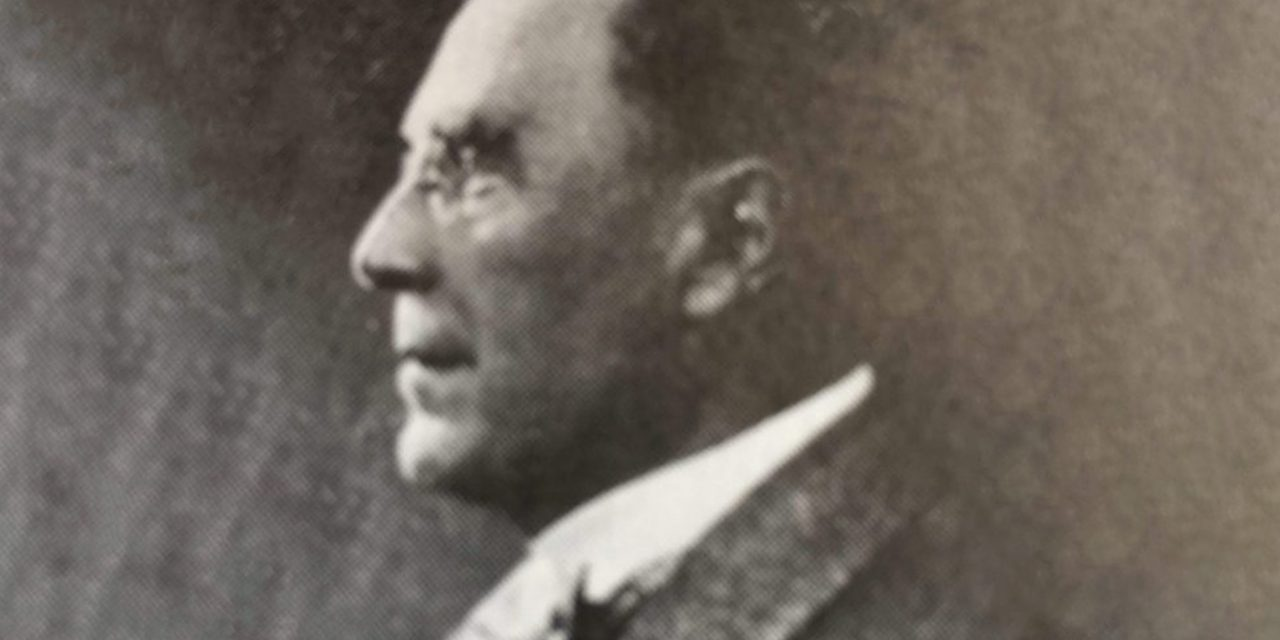
- William Ernest Jones
- Born: 14 July 1867; Upper Gornall, Staffordshire, England
- Died: 1 May 1957 (aged 89)
- Occupation: Psychiatrist
- Known for: Inspector General of the Insane for the State of Victoria, 1905-1937
- Spouse: Kathleen Mary Jones (née Mahony)
- Parent(s): Alfred Jones; Caroline Jones (née Noott)

W. Ernest Jones (1867–1957) was an English-Australian psychiatrist, and the Inspector General for the Insane for the State of Victoria from 1905 until 1937.

== Early life ==
Jones was educated at Epsom College and Middlesex Hospital, graduating in 1890. His interest in lunacy developed early in his career, and over the next fifteen years, Jones held numerous positions within British asylum institutions, including becoming the medical superintendent of the Brecon and Rodnor County Joint Counties Lunatic Asylum in Wales.

In 1905, Jones was the first person to be appointed Inspector General of the Insane for the State of Victoria, and travelled to Melbourne to commence his five-year appointment. In the event, Jones held this position until 1937.

== Career ==
As Inspector General, Jones was quick to criticise issues such as overcrowding and under-resourcing in Victoria's mental health institutions. He recommended that improvements be made to buildings and was a proponent of newer attitudes and approaches to the treatment of mental health. Notwithstanding, in 1926, he would himself be criticised by a royal commission on the grounds of failing to have made improvements to the overcrowding and general state of Victoria's institutions.

Jones was a proponent of eugenics and, ostensibly as a result, a racist. Around 1911, Jones began to develop his ideas around eugenics. At the time, Australia, and particularly Victoria, had a relatively high incidence of lunacy in relation to England and other of its realms. Jones concluded on that basis a preference for limited immigration from southern Europe in favour of Anglo-Saxon and Celtic settlers.

In 1928, he conducted an inquiry into mental deficiency in the Commonwealth, on behalf of the Bruce federal government, and was criticised for delays in producing his report. To this end, he conducted a survey of more than 1 million children throughout the country, and, while admitting his report contained errors, he considered it a sufficient basis upon which the federal government should develop immigration policy with a view to reducing mental defectiveness amongst the population and thereby to protect and enhance Australia's economy.

== Death ==
Having survived his wife by some five years, Jones died on 1 May 1957, and was privately cremated.
