= Alfred Aldridge Kelley =

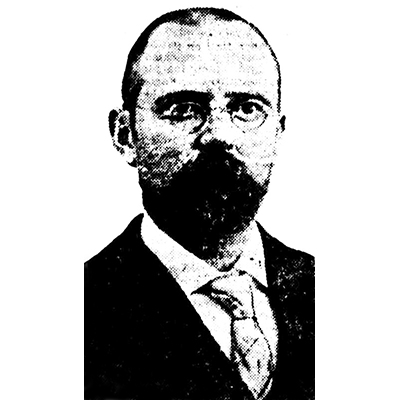
- Born: 28 July 1866; Avoca, Victoria
- Died: 29 August 1947 (aged 81); Prahran, Victoria
- Education: Ballarat College
- Occupations: Lawyer, Police Magistrate
- Spouse: Margaret Jane Kelley (née Charles)
- Children: Ralph Bodkin Kelley (born 1890)

Alfred Aldridge Kelley (1866–1947) was an Australian lawyer, civil servant, and police magistrate in the State of Victoria. Kelley was appointed as a police magistrate and gold warden in 1910, holding both positions until 1929.

== Personal life and career ==
Born in Avoca, Victoria, he was educated at Ballarat College. In 1887 he married Margaret Jane Charles, and commenced his appointment as police magistrate in Beechworth on 27 June 1910. Prior to this appointment, Kelley joined the public service in July 1883, holding positions in the Public Works Department and the Law Department, with grade promotions in 1900 and 1907.

In October 1924, Kelley was appointed as the sole commissioner in the Royal Commission into the Hospital for Insane, Kew.

In July 1926, at age 59, Kelley was appointed as the police magistrate for the Melbourne City Court and was replaced in Beechworth by Mr C. J. Rogers. At the time, this appointment to a city court was seen as a promotion from a country court.

== Death ==
Kelley died on 29 August 1947 at his home at 46 Larnook Street, Prahran. He was cremated privately and his ashes scattered at Springvale Cemetery on 1 September 1947.
