= Marjorie Buckingham =

Australian writer of children's books and Christian fiction (1913–2003)

- Born: 15 October 1913; Melbourne, Australia
- Died: 1 August 2003 (aged 89); Melbourne, Australia
- Occupations: writer lecturer minister
- Writing career
- Genres: Christian fiction children's literature school stories

Marjorie Buckingham (15 October 1913 - 1 August 2003) was an Australian writer of children's books and Christian fiction.

== Early life and education ==
Marjorie Buckingham was born on 15 October 1913 in Melbourne, Australia. Her father was a minister. She attended Cairns State High School. She won a prize for prose in The Australasian when she was 17.

== Career ==
Buckingham taught shorthand, typing and secretarial skills at the Girls' Commercial School in Melbourne. The school was one of the institutions which later became the Royal Melbourne Institute of Technology, and Buckingham was appointed senior lecturer there. She taught at the institute for 32 years. She was awarded an honorary fellowship by the Australian Institute of Private Secretaries.

Buckingham later became a minister in the Churches of Christ. Her church was at Bambra Road in Caulfield, Victoria.

The Port Lincoln Times said of her books "Marjorie Buckingham made a very fine and impressive entrance among authors of books which churchgoing and religious folk love in the world of light and heavy romance. She wrote one called "All These Things" a quote from the famous text "In all these things we are more than conquerors". The typical girl of 18 who had been raised in church and Sunday School ethics simply loved, adored and devoured it".

== Books ==
- In All These Things (1949, New Life Publications)
- Broad is the Way (1953, Oliphants), described as "suitable for teenage girls"
- They Shall Be Mine: A School Story (1954, Oliphants)
- The Adventures of Tina and Tim: A Story for Girls and Boys (1954, Oliphants)
- Strait is the Gate (1956, Oliphants)
- This My Son (1960, Oliphants)
- Many Waters (1965, Oliphants)
