= Violet Mount =

Australian soprano

Violet Mount (15 March 1875 – 1972) was an Australian soprano, active in Australia from at least 1902 and afterwards in Britain from 1908, where she performed as L'Incognita.

Violet Mount, April 1906, Melbourne

== Biography ==
Mount was born in Caulfield, Victoria on 15 March 1875 and raised in Melbourne. Her Canadian-born father, Lambton Le Brerton Mount (c.1835–1931), had been a sheep farmer in Western Australian from December 1866 and briefly co-owned properties with Adam Lindsay Gordon, the Australian poet. Lambton later owned and managed a bottle works in Sandridge from the 1870s. He married Mary Frances Glynn in June 1874.

Mount's mother played piano, and her younger sister, Winifred, provided viola for a recital at their family home in September 1896 while Mount sang "Ave Maria". In July of the following year she was a student at the Howard Conservatoire of Music, Elsternwick, where she participated in their concert and was, "heard to advantage in an aria from La Figlia del Reggimento." In October 1897 took the role of The Plaintiff in Gilbert and Sullivan's comic opera, Trial by Jury, at the Prahran Town Hall. Melbourne Punch's reporter observed, "[she] sustained the part excellently" before an audience, including her parents. She studied under William Parklnson when living in Victoria.

Mount returned to Australia in July 1902, after "[having] spent three years on the continent of Europe, and lived some time in New Zealand." In Germany she studied under Herr Odenwald and in France, with Madame Caut. While in New Zealand she performed oratorio; as a sole vocalist for Gerardy and for Friedenthal; and appeared in an opera in Wellington and Auckland. The soprano performed a concert at Melbourne's Centenary Hall where, "she sang 'Ernani Involami', 'Elizabeth's Greeting to the Hall of Song', 'All Souls' Day', and 'Widmung' (Schuman) with encores." In August she sang at Sydney's Queen's Hall where "[her] rendering of the 'Jewel Song', from Faust, and "Elizabeth's Greeting to the Hall of Song" (Tannhauser), was exceedingly enjoyed, her high soprano showing to greater advantage in the latter number."

In February 1904 she indicated her desire to shift to London, "She is at present under Signor Carl Hazon, and is considered the first soprano in Sydney... this gifted singer is ambitious to make her debut in Grand Opera." In May 1906 she gave a concert at the Melbourne Town Hall to a large audience, which "must have been well satisfied by what they heard... Her voice is a bright, clear, ringing soprano of very wide range–she touched F sharp in alt with exact truth of intonation and perfect sweetness–and she has trained it to an astonishing degree of flexibility."

In May 1907 Mount left Australia for London, having sung oratorio in Melbourne and Sydney for several years. The Sydney Mail claimed she was "doubtless Australia's best soprano." By May 1908, London critics were praising her in the guise of a masked soprano, "L'Incognita". This disguise followed a suggestion by George Byng, conductor at the Alhambra Music Hall, at which she was singing arias from opera since March 1908. In this hall, she appeared on the same bills as marionettes and a musical dog. Her choice of arias mirrored the work at the time of Luisa Tetrazzini at Covent Garden, and there was some speculation that that diva was in fact L'Incognita. Mount also appeared at the Hippodrome in programmes of similar content to that of the Alhambra, billed simply as "soprano soloist", and billed lower than two performing monkeys, despite her talent.

She recorded extensively for the Zonophone label around 1910 as L'Incognita, and her identity was unknown for years. She was still active in 1921, when she was working with the distinguished Australian flautist John Amadio. She toured the Moss Empire circuit for two years and was by one critic found to be a "first class artist with a very pleasing and graceful stage presence". This latter detail was related in a letter of 1943 to The Gramophone magazine signed by F. W. Gaisberg (Fred Gaisberg), a major executive from EMI. Mount died in 1972.

Listening now to the recordings reveals that she possessed a bright, open voice, and that she had no fear of high notes, some of which are added ad lib. Her pitch was just occasionally insecure.
