= Caulfield South =

- Suburb
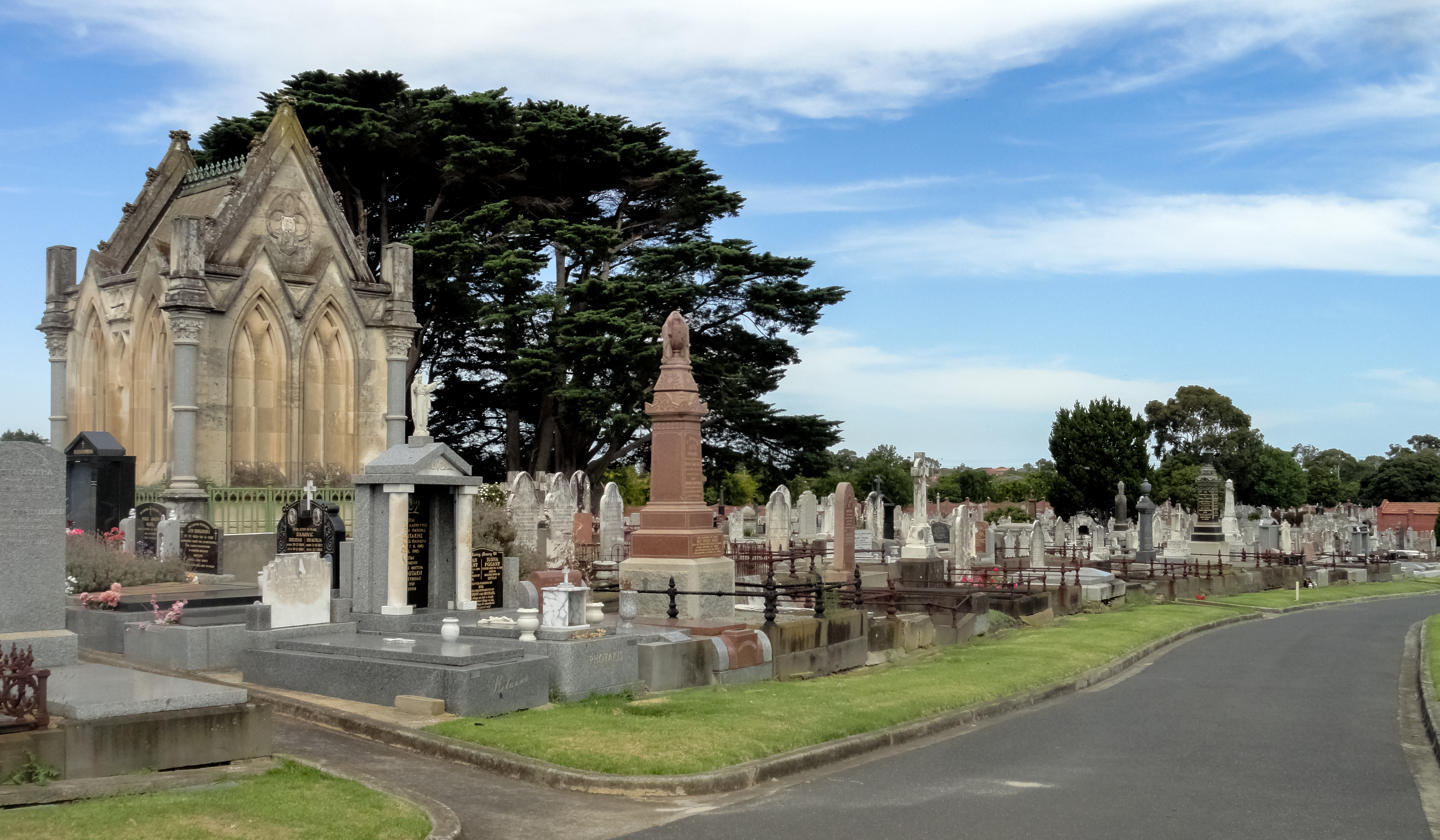
- Cemetery at Caulfield South

- Interactive map of Caulfield South
- Coordinates: 37.891°S 145.026°E
- Country: Australia
- State: Victoria
- City: Melbourne
- LGA: City of Glen Eira
- Location: 10 km (6.2 mi) from Melbourne

Government
  - State electorate: Caulfield
  - Federal division: Goldstein

Area
  - Total: 3.3 km^{2} (1.3 sq mi)
- Elevation: 25 m (82 ft)

Population
  - Total: 12,328 (2021 census)
  - Density: 3,740/km^{2} (9,680/sq mi)
- Postcode: 3162
Suburbs around Caulfield South
Elsternwick	Caulfield	Caulfield East
Elsternwick	Caulfield South	Glen Huntly
Gardenvale	Brighton East	Ormond

Caulfield South is a suburb in Melbourne, Victoria, Australia, 10 km south-east of Melbourne's Central Business District, located within the City of Glen Eira local government area. Caulfield South recorded a population of 12,328 at the 2021 census.

Caulfield South is bounded by Glen Huntly Road to the north, Booran Road to the east, North Road to the south and Kooyong Road to the west. Although it has no railway station, it is serviced by tram routes 64 and 67. Elsternwick, Glen Huntly and Caulfield railway stations are all within a short drive, with both Elsternwick and Glenhuntly stations accessible via the number 67 tram.

One landmark of note is the Caulfield General Medical Centre, which began life as one of the local mansions, the Glen Eira. This was purchased in 1915 by the Australian Department of Defence and turned into No. 11 Army General Hospital where it served as a rehabilitation centre for returned servicemen from the Great War who sustained permanent or severe injuries. It has since undergone many changes of purpose and management and currently caters primarily for rehabilitation and geriatric medicine.

The Brighton Cemetery is also located in Caulfield South, and pre-dates the Caulfield Roads Board - the first official recognition of the suburb of Caulfield. Opened in 1855 it became, together with St Kilda Cemetery, an alternative resting place for those who had lived south of the Yarra River. There are up 70,000 people interred, including famous Australian artists, politicians and military heroes.

Caulfield South has many parks and gardens, the most notable of which is Princes Park. The area was a council landfill up until the middle of the twentieth century, when it was transformed into public park lands. It has been improved further and now includes several ovals and playing fields, sports clubs, pavillons, open spaces, children's playgrounds and many paved walking tracks with dog walking welcome.

The Rosstown Railway once ran through Caulfield South, and its traversal through several suburban blocks remains public land to this day, an easy identifier of where the track once ran.

The architecture of Caulfield South is predominately period-style detached 2 and 3 bedroom family homes with both front and rear gardens. Not all properties have off-street parking and rely on space available on the street. The architectural styles range from the early 1900s and onwards with common styles being Edwardian weather board to Californian Bungalow to Red Brick Clinker pairs which share a common wall. An increasing trend is the demolition of the original house to construct a large, two-storey modern house. There are also a growing number of higher density apartments and flats appearing, especially close to the tram lines.

Native wildlife that inhabit the suburb include both ring tail and brush tail possums, magpies, crested pigeons, rainbow lorikeets and wattle birds.

Based on findings from the 2011 census and their own research, The Australian Centre for Jewish Civilisation at Monash University estimates that the suburb has 5,005 Jewish residents, comprising 44.4% of the suburb's population. Results from the 2016 census indicated a Jewish population of 4,008, a percentage of 33.9.

== Education ==
Caulfield South Primary School is located in Bundeera Road.

The Japanese School of Melbourne (JSM), a Japanese international school, is located in Caulfield South. Several Japanese families settled in the area around Caulfield due to the location of the JSM. There were nine temporarily located Japanese families in Caulfield South in 1987, and the Japanese population increased after that point due to the school.

The suburb is also home to the Fink Karp Ivany campus of Mount Scopus Memorial College, a Jewish day school. 25% of Jewish children in Caulfield South attend government schools and the remainder attend independent schools.

== See also ==
- City of Caulfield – Caulfield South was previously within this former local government area.
