= Edward Cornelius =

Australian murderer

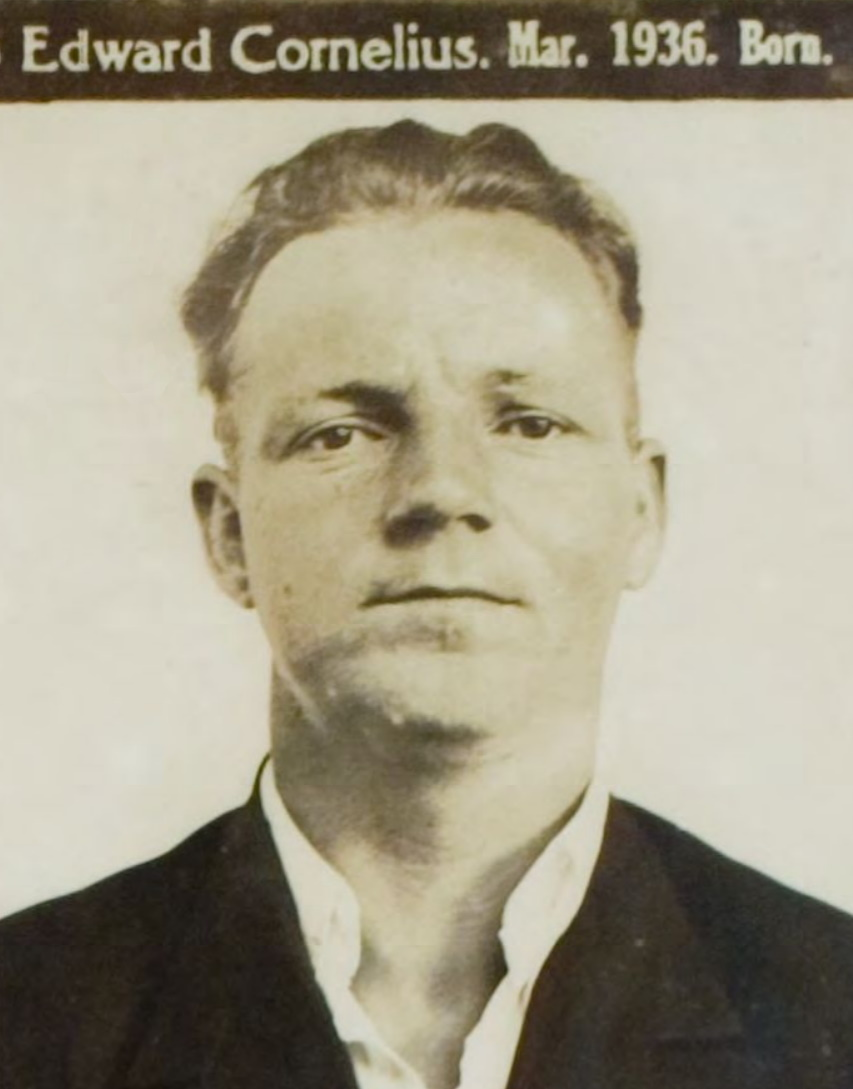
- Edward Cornelius, photographed in March 1936
- Born: c. 1910^{[A]} Longford, Tasmania, Australia
- Died: 22 June 1936 (aged 24); HM Prison Pentridge, Victoria, Australia
- Other names: Frank Lane, Thomas Shaw
- Occupation: Motor mechanic
- Status: Executed by hanging
- Conviction: Murder
- Penalty: Death

Edward Cornelius (c. 1910 – 22 June 1936) was an Australian convicted murderer and petty criminal. His criminal record began in his mid-teenage years and he served his first prison sentence three years later. He was convicted of killing Rev. H. Laceby Cecil during a robbery of a vicarage in the inner Melbourne suburb of Collingwood. Cornelius was executed at Pentridge Prison in June 1936, the third of eleven people to be hanged there after the closure of Melbourne Gaol in 1924.

== Biography ==
=== Early life ===
Edward Cornelius was born in about 1910 in Longford, Tasmania.^{[A]} He attended the Longford State School, receiving his Qualifying Certificate in January 1925, aged 13 years, for admission to a State High School.

On 24 February 1925 Cornelius, a school-student from Longford, was involved in what was described as a "schoolboy scuffle" or "skylarking" on the Launceston railway station, prior to the departure of the Deloraine train. His hand was in the jamb of a carriage doorway when it was slammed shut by one of his companions, resulting in the fingers of his left hand being badly crushed. Cornelius was taken to the Launceston Public Hospital and admitted for treatment.

As a child Cornelius was committed to the care of the State Department for Neglected Children as an uncontrollable child.

=== Criminal activities ===
On 30 July 1925 Cornelius was convicted of "wilful damage to property" in the Launceston Police Office, and ordered to pay costs of 8 shillings and damages of 21 shillings.

On 9 September 1926 in the Launceston Police Office Cornelius was convicted of larceny, and ordered to pay a fine of 10 shillings.

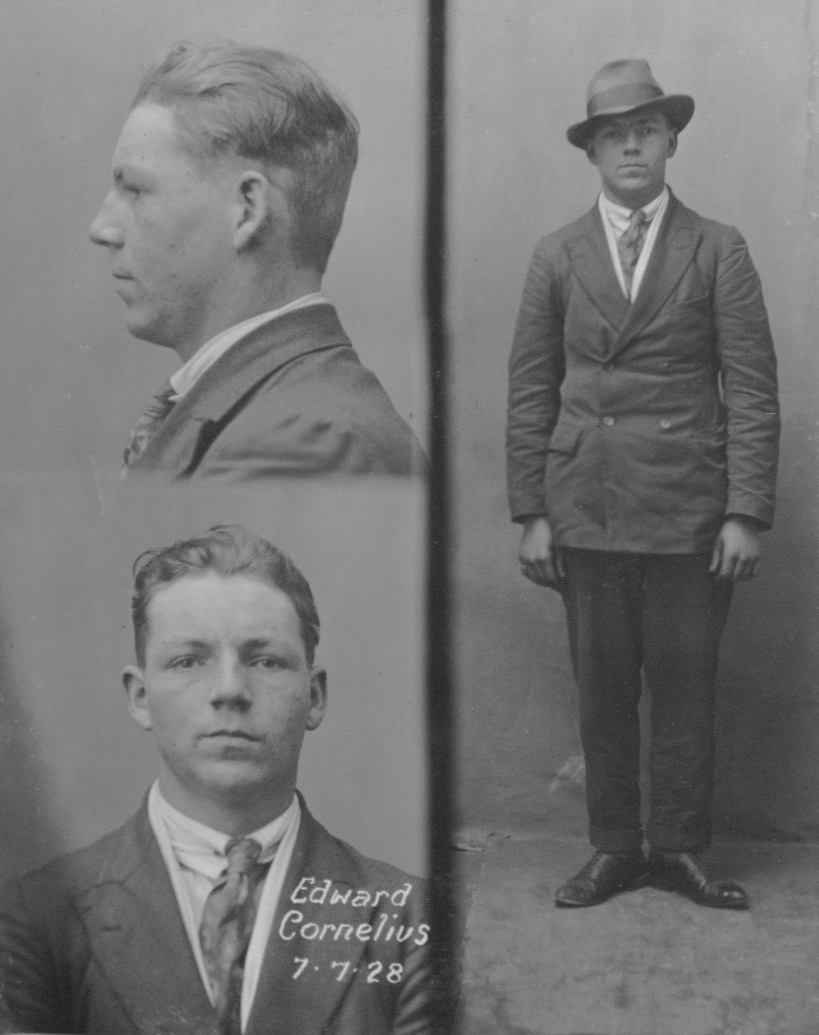
Tasmanian police identification photographs of Edward Cornelius (July 1928).

When he reached the age of 18, Cornelius was apprenticed to Messrs. Hodges and Bond, garage proprietors at 71 York Street, Launceston. Cornelius had been absent from work for a few days due to illness when, in the early afternoon of 5 July 1928, in company with another young man, he went to the York-street garage of his employer. While his companion waited outside, Cornelius went inside to enquire "if there were any letters for him". The office door was closed but the key was in the lock. Cornelius entered the office and stole an envelope containing cheques and three £1 notes. He and his companion then went to Prince's Park where Cornelius opened the envelope, divided the cash amongst themselves and flushed the cheques down a toilet. Cornelius was apprehended the next day and pleaded guilty before the Launceston Police Magistrate. On July 14 he was sentenced in the Hobart Supreme Court to six months' imprisonment. The Chief Justice, Herbert Nicholls, said that unfortunately he was unable to deal with the prisoner under the First Offenders' Act, as he had a previous conviction of larceny.

Cornelius was released from prison on 5 November 1928. The reference to his release in the Tasmanian Police Gazette included the following description: "motor mechanic, age 19 years, height 5 feet 8 inches, fair complexion, fair hair, dark-blue eyes, thick nose, native of Tasmania; scar first joint of right finger, first three fingers of left hand have been crushed at tips".

At about 8 o'clock in the evening of 16 January 1929 Cornelius and another younger man stole a Hupmobile motor-car belonging to Father T. J. O'Donnell, parked outside the Roman Catholic Presbytery at Latrobe, in northern Tasmania. They drove the car south-east towards Deloraine, but ran out of petrol three miles short of the township and the vehicle was abandoned. The next morning a passing motorist reported seeing the abandoned car near Deloraine. Later that morning the Deloraine police spoke to two strangers in town (Cornelius and his companion) and questioned them regarding their movements the previous night. With Cornelius' answers "not being deemed satisfactory", he was taken to the station where he eventually admitted to having taken the vehicle. Cornelius told police he had been out of work for some time and wanted to get to Launceston. He had been looking for work along the coast, but ran short of money and had started to walk to Launceston when he saw the car at Latrobe. While Cornelius was being questioned his companion absconded. In the Latrobe Police Court on 18 January 1929, Cornelius was sentenced to three months' imprisonment in Hobart Gaol for having unlawfully used a motor car without the consent of the owner. Cornelius' companion was later detained at Launceston and was "dealt with" in the Latrobe Children's Court.

=== The Ulverstone robbery ===
Cornelius was released from his second period of incarceration on 17 April 1929, aged about 19 years.

In early July 1929 Edward Cornelius and two other young men, Alfred Miles and Stanley Robinson, walked the 73 miles (117 km) from Launceston to Ulverstone seeking employment, arriving at their destination on July 4. On the night of their arrival in Ulverstone the three young men were observed in the vicinity of a motor garage belonging to Motors Pty. Ltd., in which a new Chevrolet car was parked. Later that night they broke into the garage and stole the car, as well as a cash-box containing money and cheques, a clock and a gold-mounted fountain pen. Cornelius, Miles and Robinson drove the Chevrolet back to Launceston, along the way throwing away the emptied cash-box and some of the cheques. On July 6, the three men travelled from Launceston to Melbourne aboard the Loongana passenger vessel, but were arrested by Victorian detectives on arrival. Cash of about £30 each was found in the possession of Miles and Robinson, but Cornelius had thrown his share of the stolen money (about £40) into the Yarra River when he saw the detectives approaching. On July 8, the three young men were remanded for a week in the Melbourne City Court on charges of vagrancy, pending the arrival of a police escort and warrant from Tasmania.

On July 18, Cornelius, Miles and Robinson were brought before the Hobart Criminal Court, where they pleaded guilty to the charges. The prisoners were sentenced on the following day. Cornelius, with previous convictions, was sentenced to 18 months' imprisonment. Robinson, who also had previous convictions, received a 12 months' sentence and Miles, with no criminal record, was placed on a bond.

Cornelius was released from prison on 4 October 1930 "by remission".

=== Housebreaking ===
In March 1932, in the Sydney Quarter Sessions, Cornelius (under the name Thomas Shaw) received a six months' sentence for breaking and entering.

On 29 September 1932 a hairdresser named John Kennedy (charged under the name John Davis) and Cornelius (under the name Frank Lane), motor mechanic, both of Napier Street, Fitzroy, were charged at the Preston Court with having broken into and stolen articles valued at £120 from five separate dwellings in the Melbourne suburbs of Preston, Brunswick and Thornbury. Both men pleaded guilty to the charges of housebreaking and theft. On October 17 Kennedy (Davis) and Cornelius (Lane) were each sentenced to four years' imprisonment with hard labour. On October 22 Cornelius was transferred to Pentridge Prison.

Cornelius was released from Pentridge Prison on 21 October 1935 and found accommodation in a flat at 128 Gipps Street, East Melbourne.

=== The murder of Rev. Cecil ===
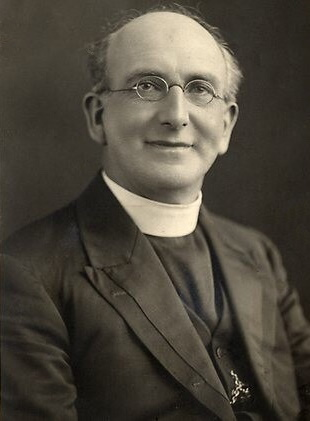
Rev. H. Laceby Cecil

On the morning of Thursday, 12 December 1935, Cornelius called at the vicarage of St. Saviour's Anglican church in Collingwood, after having heard "a rumor that there was a considerable amount of money" there. At that time of the year the church had been receiving money to assist a Christmas appeal. The vicarage was located at 25 Smith Street, a block away from the church on the corner of Mason and Oxford streets. When Rev. H. Laceby Cecil opened the door, Cornelius pretended to be there "to make arrangements about a marriage" and was invited inside. They entered the study where the vicar asked him questions about the impending marriage, which he wrote on a form. The form was handed to Cornelius, who also signed a 'Notice of Marriage' card under an assumed name of Francis Edward Layne (or Loyne). Cornelius then left and walked down Smith Street to Victoria Parade, before turning and walking back to the vicarage. He entered the open front door and crept into the study. Cornelius had been carrying tools wrapped in brown paper (a wheel-spanner, a crescent-spanner, a screwdriver and a rule), which he placed on the desk while he began to rifle through the drawers looking for money. As he did so, Rev. Cecil entered the room, saying "What are you after?" Cornelius grabbed the wheel-spanner and struck Cecil several times on the head, who then fell against the couch. Cornelius went to close the front door and when he turned, Cecil was in the passage, bleeding from his wounds. Cornelius hit him several more times with the spanner, and the vicar fell onto the floor of the passage-way. Cornelius searched Cecil's pockets and found about £8 in notes. He also grabbed a watch-chain and two watches, one gold and one silver. Cornelius washed blood from his face and hands using a jug from the dining room. As he left by the back door, by Cornelius' later confession, Rev. Cecil "seemed to be unconscious and was moaning". As he left, he threw the spanner into "a crevice between two buildings".

Rev. Cecil's body was discovered on the evening after his murder when six parishioners arrived at the vicarage for a scheduled vestry meeting. After knocking at the front door and waiting, they tried the back door. Finding it unlocked they entered and found the vicar's body in the hallway with his head battered. In the kitchen the vestrymen found a meal had been in preparation; the gas was still burning beneath a kettle, the bottom of which was burnt out. After a squad of detectives arrived at the scene, "news of the tragedy spread quickly in the district and large crowds stood outside the house until a late hour". The following morning detectives found a blood-stained and rusty iron wheel-spanner in a crevice between a chimney and a toilet outhouse at the vicarage, with a piece of brown paper adhering to one end.

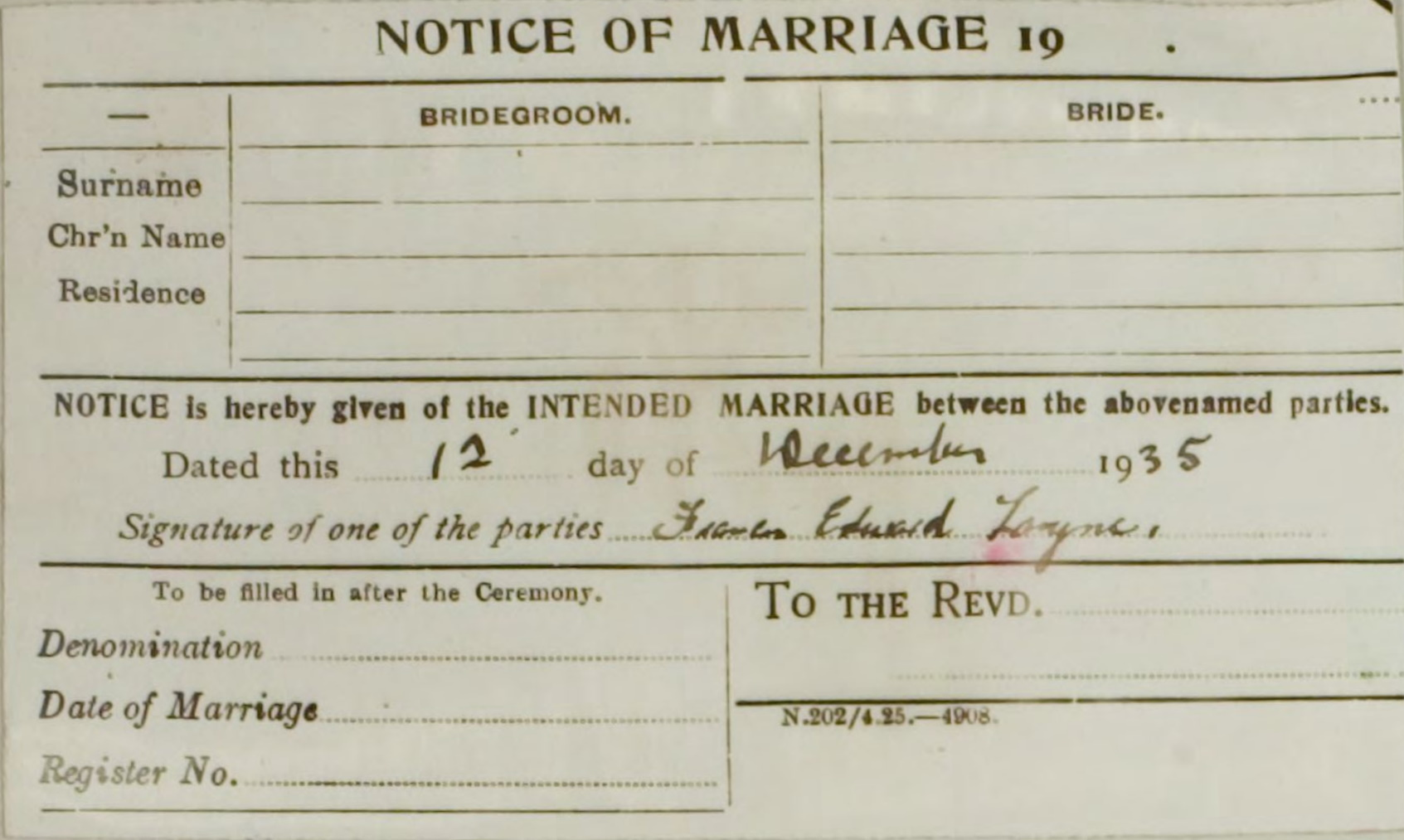
The partially-completed 'Notice of Marriage' card found in the vicarage study after Rev. Cecil's murder.

On 22 January 1936 an inquest into the death of Rev. H. Laceby Cecil was held at the Morgue by the City Coroner. The Government pathologist, Dr. Mollison, described numerous wounds on the deceased's head, arms and hands and stated that death had been caused by the head injuries, hæmorrhage and shock, evidently from being struck with the spanner that was found in the grounds of the vicarage. Bruises found on the arms and fingers had been received while trying to ward off the blows. The Coroner's finding was that Rev. Cecil had died from injuries inflicted by "some person or persons unknown".

One piece of physical evidence from the crime scene was the partially-completed 'Notice of Marriage' card found in the study, with the date written in one hand and a name, "Francis Edward Layne" (or "Loyne"), written in another. While searching through criminal records detectives investigating the murder found that Edward Cornelius had used the name 'Frank Lane' when convicted of house-breaking charges in 1932, and had been released from Pentridge Prison only seven weeks before the vicarage murder. Cornelius' place of abode was determined to be a front upstairs flat at 128 Gipps Street, East Melbourne, and detectives arrived there at early in the morning of 12 February 1936. Cornelius and a young woman named Edna Wall were taken to the Detective Office in Russell Street for questioning.

During the interrogation Cornelius was taken to the shop of a secondhand dealer in Prahran, from where detectives had previously ascertained the spanner used to murder Rev. Cecil had been purchased. The wife of the shop-owner identified Cornelius as the man to whom she had sold the spanner for nine pence on 11 December 1935. After intensive questioning Cornelius finally admitted to killing Cecil, but claimed the vicar had attacked him and he had acted in self-defence. He dictated a statement detailing the sequence of events, written down by one of the detectives, and afterwards Cornelius signed the document. He was then charged and taken to Pentridge Prison.

A second inquiry into Rev. Cecil's death was held on 27 and 28 February 1936. On the first day of the inquest John Long, Cornelius' legal representative, strongly objected to his client's alleged confession being introduced as evidence and to its subsequent publication. Knowing it was inevitable Cornelius would be committed for trial, Long was concerned the admission of the statement would prejudice his client's case. After a lengthy legal argument the Police Magistrate ruled that the statement was admissible and could be read into evidence. A number of witnesses gave evidence to the inquest over the two days. After Long announced his client would reserve his defence, Cornelius was committed for trial on a murder charge.

=== Trial and appeal ===
Edward Cornelius was tried for the murder of Rev. H. Laceby Cecil over three days, beginning 24 March 1936, in the Melbourne Criminal Court before Justice Martin. Cornelius pleaded not guilty. His counsel began by challenging the admissibility of the statement made on February 12, claiming the accused had signed the document under duress and detectives had obtained a sample of his handwriting by trickery. After hearing the arguments of both sides the judge ruled that the statement was admissible. On the second day, after the witnesses for the prosecution had given their evidence, Mr. Long opened the case for the defence by putting Cornelius in the witness box. The accused man admitted to causing Rev. Cecil's death but claimed he had been attacked by the vicar and his actions were in self-defence. During the summing up by the defence counsel, Long claimed that Rev. Cecil "had an opportunity to avoid a struggle". He added that "it was probable he was anticipating the return of the accused, was setting a trap for him, and that he grabbed Cornelius by the throat". In instructing the jury Justice Martin made the point that "a householder was entitled to use such force as was necessary to protect his goods". He concluded that "if the jury... thought that accused, in striking the blows, intended to do grievous bodily harm, then undoubtedly he was guilty of murder". The jury returned after an hour's consideration with a verdict of guilty of murder. When Cornelius was asked if he had anything to say why sentence should not be passed on him, replied "in a tremulous voice": "I am not guilty of this offence. I am afraid the jury has made a grave mistake in bringing in such a verdict". Justice Martin then pronounced a sentence of death.

On 16 April 1936 an appeal was heard in the Victorian Court of Criminal Appeal where it was argued by Cornelius' counsel that the "written statement he made to the police had been wrongly admitted at his trial, and that the verdict was against the weight of the evidence". The Court unanimously upheld the prisoner's conviction and sentence.

On 9 June 1936 the Full Bench of the High Court unanimously dismissed an application by John Long, counsel for Cornelius, for special leave to appeal against his conviction. After this decision the Victorian Cabinet met to discuss the case, with the trial judge, Justice Martin, also attending. At the Cabinet meeting it was decided to recommend against the commutation of the sentence of death. The date of Cornelius' execution was set for June 22.

=== Execution ===
Cornelius was being kept in an observation cell in D Division at Pentridge. For several months Cornelius shared death row in Pentridge Prison with the convicted murderer, Arnold Sodeman. The two men spent much of the day playing draughts on the day before Sodeman was hanged on 1 June 1936.

Edward Cornelius was hanged at Pentridge Prison at eight o'clock in the morning on 22 June 1936. It was reported that he appeared calm before the death sentence was carried out; when asked if he had anything to say, he replied, "Nothing. I'm right".

== Victim ==
- Harold Laceby Cecil – born on 21 November 1876 at Oxley, Victoria (near Wangaratta), the eldest child of Charles Cecil and Agnes (née Vincent). Cecil attended the Perry Divinity Hall theological college in Bendigo and was ordained in the Church of England as a deacon in November 1900, appointed to Drake, New South Wales (near the border with Queensland); he was ordained as an Anglican priest in June 1903 at Grafton by the Bishop of Grafton and Armidale. From 1900 to 1911 he had charge of parishes in northern New South Wales: curate of the Drake parish (1900 to 1904); vicar of Mid-Richmond (1904 to 1907); vicar of Tweed Heads-Murwillumbah (1908 to 1911). In 1911 Rev. Cecil returned to Victoria, taking charge of the Werribee parish from 1911 to May 1918. During World War I he was a chaplain in the Royal Australian Air Force. He was appointed minister at St. Saviour's church in Collingwood in May 1918. In March 1928 (after the death of his father in January 1928) Cecil travelled to England aboard the SS Ceramic "for a few months in England and Ireland", the purpose of his trip being "to have a long overdue holiday, and also to gain experience of work in the poorer quarters of London". Cecil wrote a book about his travels called A Wandering Vicar: A Peep at England, Scotland and Ireland, published in 1929 by H. Hearne & Company. Rev. H. Laceby Cecil was a bachelor and lived alone. He was murdered, aged 59 years, on 12 December 1935 by Cornelius during a robbery at his home. Rev. Cecil was buried in the Daylesford cemetery on December 15.

== Notes ==
A.There is a wide variation in documents and newspaper references in regard to Edward Cornelius' age and/or year of birth. In general the later Victorian records specifically record his year of birth as 1906 or state his age as indicating a 1906 year of birth (or thereabouts), whereas the earlier Tasmanian records indicate he was younger than that. For instance, Cornelius' Victorian prisoner record states his date of birth was 1906 and newspaper reports in early 1936 nominate his age as 29 years. His earlier Tasmanian prisoner record does not show a date of birth (due to damage to the document), but the photographs and criminal record prove the individuals in both documents are identical. The Tasmanian prisoner document records the crushed fingertips of his left hand, which occurred in a well-documented incident in February 1925 when Cornelius was a 13-year-old schoolboy (according to the contemporary newspaper reports). If he were born in 1906, Cornelius would have been an 18- or 19-year-old in 1925, rather than a 13-year-old schoolboy. Considering he had received his Qualifying Certificate a month earlier, enabling his admission to High School, a year of birth as early as 1906 is highly unlikely. The year of birth of "about 1910" was chosen on the basis of Cornelius receiving an apprenticeship in 1928 when he turned 18. His first custodial sentence was also in 1928.
