= Igor and Olga Machlak =

Russian piano duo based in Australia

Igor and Olga Machlak are a Russian piano duo based in Ormond, Melbourne, Australia. Both graduated from the Moscow Tchaikovsky Conservatory as solo pianists with first class honours. They have won multiple awards. "Unknowned in the European countries", this "remarkable pair" have been playing together for over 20 years. They moved to Australia in 1995, and have had two children, Iounna and Misha, both of whom are also musicians.
