= Reginald Spencer Ellery =

Australian psychiatrist

Reginald Spencer Ellery (12 August 1897 – 27 December 1955) was a pioneer in the practice of psychiatry in Melbourne, Australia. He was also noted as an autobiographer, memoirist, communist, and poet.

Under J. K. Adey's supervision at Sunbury, Ellery developed a greater understanding of psychiatry; together they were responsible in 1925 for the first successful application in Australia of Wagner-Jauregg's malarial-fever treatment for general paralysis of the insane.

A member of the British Psychological Society, from 1938 Ellery allied himself with a group of progressive psychiatrists led by Dr Paul Dane. In establishing the Melbourne Institute for Psycho-Analysis in October 1940, the group encountered opposition from both the Federal government and the local branch of the British Medical Association.

Although he never became a party member, Ellery was attracted to communism. During the early 1940s he published several pamphlets and books which prescribed communism as a panacea for mental and social ills.

From the start of his career when he reluctantly became a medical officer at Kew Asylum in 1923, Ellery had a progressive and provocative approach to his career. The following year, he became the subject of a Royal Commission into claims of misconduct and cruelty to patients, from which he was exonerated. When he went to Sunbury Asylum, he introduced malariotherapy, the first successful treatment, in Australia in 1925. He later had a leading role in biological therapies, such as insulin coma and convulsive therapy.

Throughout his career, he continued to lobby for the rights of psychiatric patients, socialised medicine and for a more progressive understanding of the psychological nature of crime. In regard to the latter, he went public a number of times to say that he considered all judges biased.

He was involved in a number of criminal cases as a specialist psychiatric witness, most notably that of Arnold Sodeman. Despite Ellery's finding that he was not guilty due to insanity, Sodeman was hanged.

Ellery associated with members of the Heide set, influencing artists such as Sidney Nolan and Albert Tucker. He wrote articles for the Angry Penguins journal and spoke for the defence of Max Harris at the Ern Malley pornography trial.

== Works ==
- The Cow Jumped Over the Moon (1956), (autobiography)
- Psychological Aspects of Modern Warfare (1945), published by John Reed and Max Harris.
- Eyes Left! - Book-pamphlet on the Soviet Union and the Post-War World.
- Schizophrenia, The Cinderella of Psychiatry. - Re-publication of a successful discussion of a major illness.
