= Ormond, Victoria =

Ormond
- Suburb
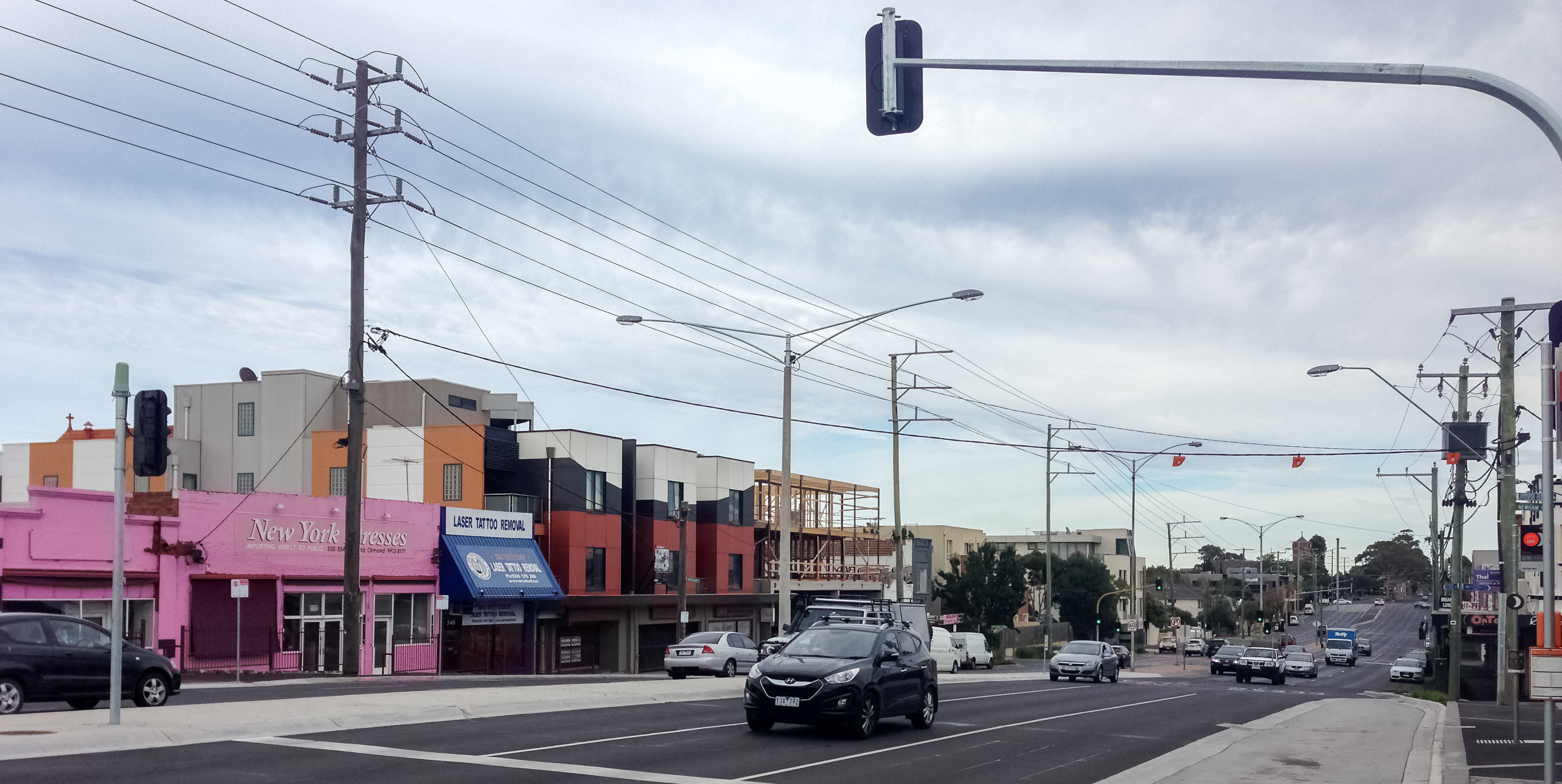
- North Road, Ormond

- Interactive map of Ormond
- Coordinates: 37.90321°S 145.03588°E
- Country: Australia
- State: Victoria
- City: Melbourne
- LGA: City of Glen Eira
- Location: 14 km (8.7 mi) from Melbourne

Government
  - State electorates: Bentleigh; Caulfield; Oakleigh
  - Federal divisions: Goldstein; Hotham

Area
  - Total: 2 km^{2} (0.77 sq mi)
- Elevation: 42 m (138 ft)

Population
  - Total: 8,328 (2021 census)
  - Density: 4,200/km^{2} (10,800/sq mi)
- Postcode: 3163, 3204
Suburbs around Ormond
Caulfield South	Glen Huntly	Carnegie
Brighton East	Ormond	Bentleigh East
Brighton East	McKinnon	Bentleigh East

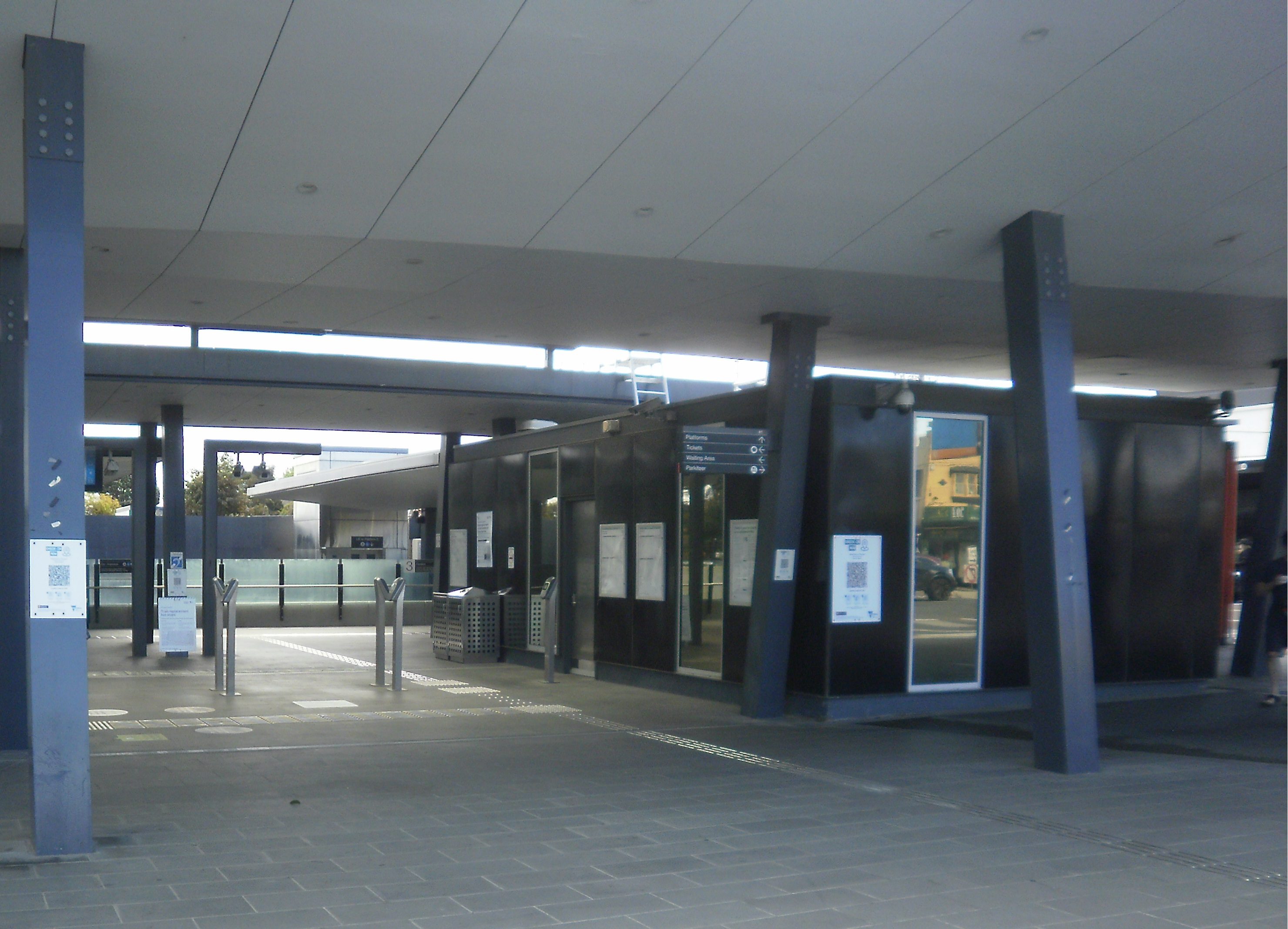
Ormond train station

Ormond is a South Eastern suburb of Melbourne, Victoria, Australia, 12 km south-east of Melbourne's Central Business District, located within the City of Glen Eira local government area. Ormond recorded a population of 8,328 at the 2021 census.

The suburb is named after politician Francis Ormond.

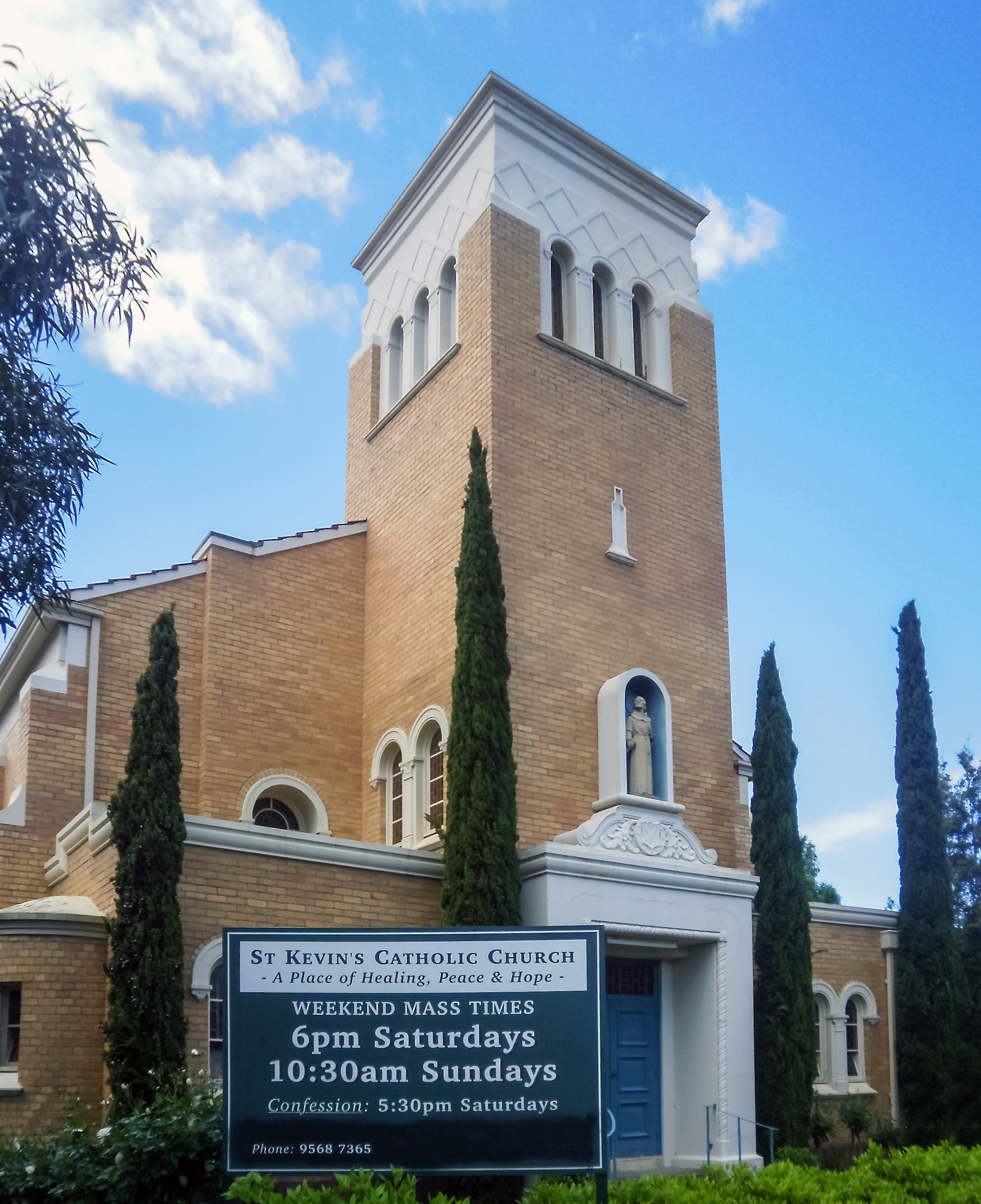
Ormond Catholic Church

== Education ==
- Kilvington Grammar School

== Notable people ==
Notable people from or who have lived in Ormond include:

- Igor and Olga Machlak, a piano duo
- Mick Harvey, a musician

== See also ==
- City of Caulfield – Parts of Ormond were previously within this former local government area.
- City of Moorabbin – Parts of Ormond were previously within this former local government area.
