= Glen Huntly =

- Suburb
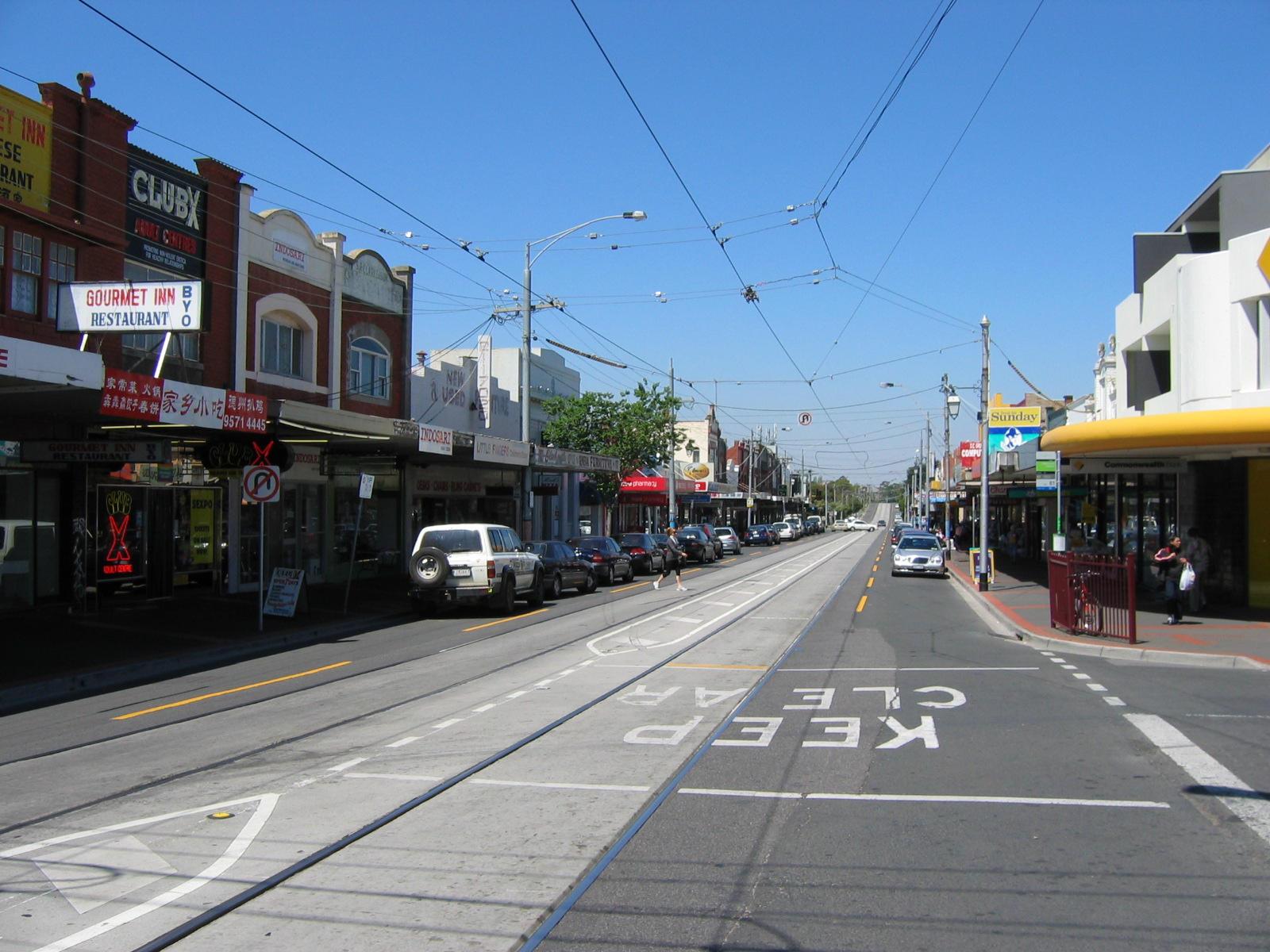
- Glen Huntly Road

- Interactive map of Glen Huntly
- Coordinates: 37.894°S 145.046°E
- Country: Australia
- State: Victoria
- City: Melbourne
- LGA: City of Glen Eira
- Location: 11 km (6.8 mi) from Melbourne

Government
  - State electorate: Caulfield
  - Federal divisions: Goldstein; Macnamara

Area
  - Total: 0.9 km^{2} (0.35 sq mi)
- Elevation: 49 m (161 ft)

Population
  - Total: 4,905 (2021 census)
  - Density: 5,450/km^{2} (14,100/sq mi)
- Postcode: 3163
Suburbs around Glen Huntly
| Caulfield | Caulfield East | Carnegie |
| Caulfield South | Glen Huntly | Carnegie |
| Caulfield South | Ormond | Ormond |

Glen Huntly is a suburb in Melbourne, Victoria, Australia, 11 km south-east of Melbourne's Central Business District, located within the City of Glen Eira local government area. Glen Huntly recorded a population of 4,905 at the 2021 census.

It is a small suburb, approximately 1 km from north to south and 800 metres east to west at its widest point. Its borders are Neerim Road in the north, Booran Road in the west, Grange Road in the east and Woodville Avenue and Oakleigh Road in the south.

== History ==
Glen Huntly is named after a ship, the Glen Huntly, that arrived in Port Phillip in April 1840, after setting off from Greenock, Scotland carrying 157 new immigrants, skilled manual labourers who were heading for the new colony settled in Melbourne. Fever, most likely typhoid, struck the ship mid journey and 10 died before reaching Port Phillip Bay. The Glen Huntly was forced to land at Little Red Bluff (now Point Ormond) where Victoria's first quarantine station, consisting of tents, was set up to deal with the crisis. Three more men died at the camp. Supplies and provisions were brought down a dirt track that became Glen Huntly Road.

=== Suburb name ===
The official name of the suburb is Glen Huntly, as shown in the Victorian Register of Geographic Names. Since its foundation, the suburb has been known at various times as Glen Huntly (two words) and Glenhuntly (one word) and this still causes confusion; a glance at various local businesses names reveals both versions being used. Glen Huntly railway station opened on 19 December 1881 as Glen Huntly Road. The station was renamed Glen Huntly on 1 September 1882, and then Glenhuntly on 20 April 1937. The name reverted back to Glen Huntly railway station on 13 April 2023 after the station as rebuilt as part of the Level Crossing Removal Project.

The Glen Huntly Post Office opened in 1907 as Glenhuntly Post Office before the name was changed to the current name in 1993.

== Public transport ==
The suburb is serviced by tram route 67 and Glen Huntly railway station on the Frankston railway line.

== Demographics ==
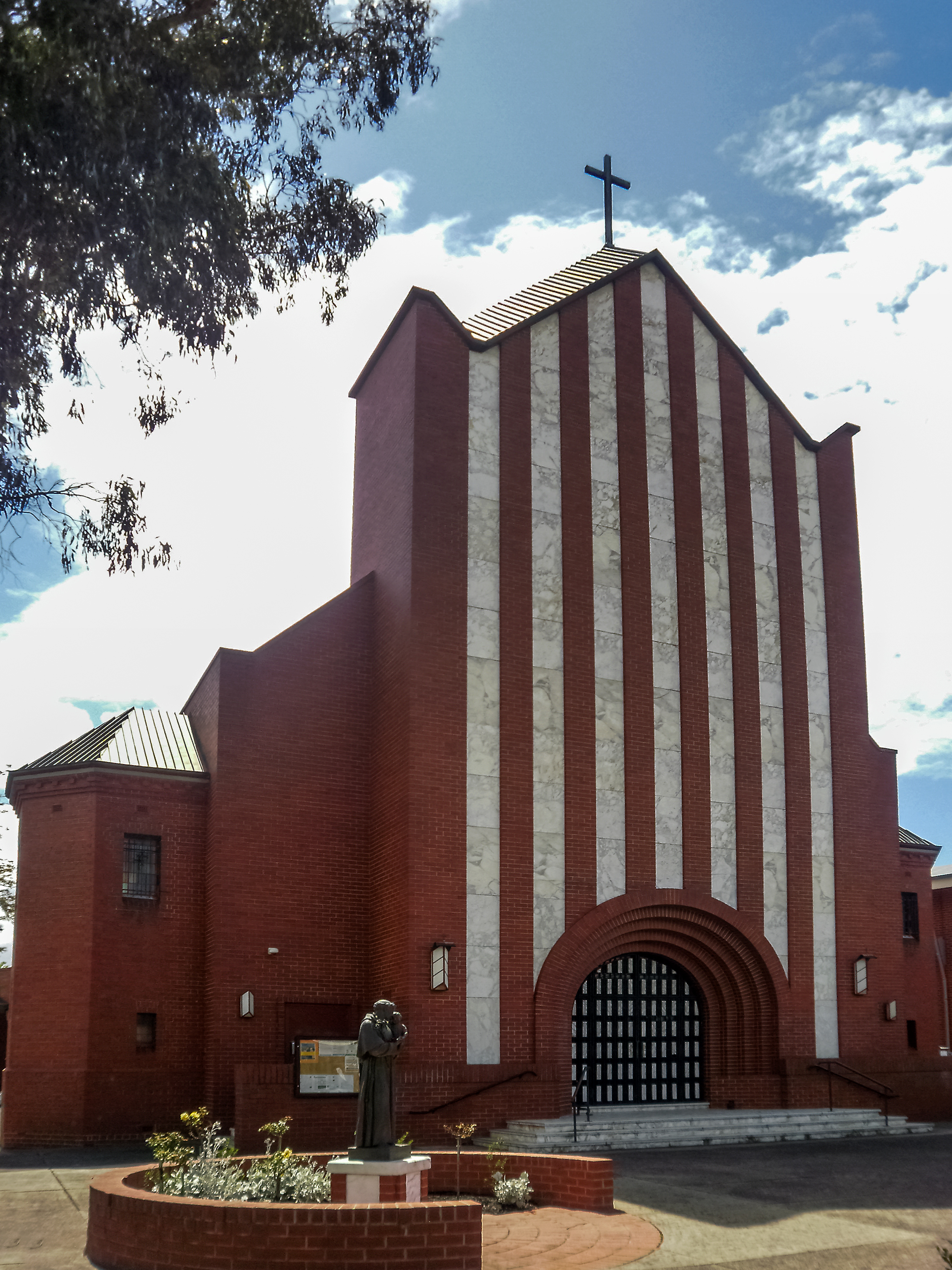
St Anthonys Glen Huntly a Catholic Church

The 2016 census showed that the median age of people in Glen Huntly was 32 years. Children 0 – 14 years made up 13.4% of the population and those aged 65 years and over made up 10.6% of the population.

38.2% of people living in Glen Huntly were born in Australia and then the next most common countries of birth were India 20.0%, China 9.3%, South Africa 2.3%, England 2.0% and Ukraine 1.4.

The census listed the main religions in Glen Huntly as Hinduism 18.4%, Catholic 13.5% and Judaism 10.2%. 'No Religion' accounted for 34.1% and 8.8% did not answer this non-compulsory census question.

== Educational institutions ==
Glen Huntly has a state primary school and a Catholic primary school and church (St Anthony's) .

== See also ==
- City of Caulfield – Glen Huntly was previously within this former local government area
- Elwood – location of Point Ormond, once known as Little Red Bluff
