= Glen Huntly railway station =

Railway station in Melbourne, Australia

Glen Huntly
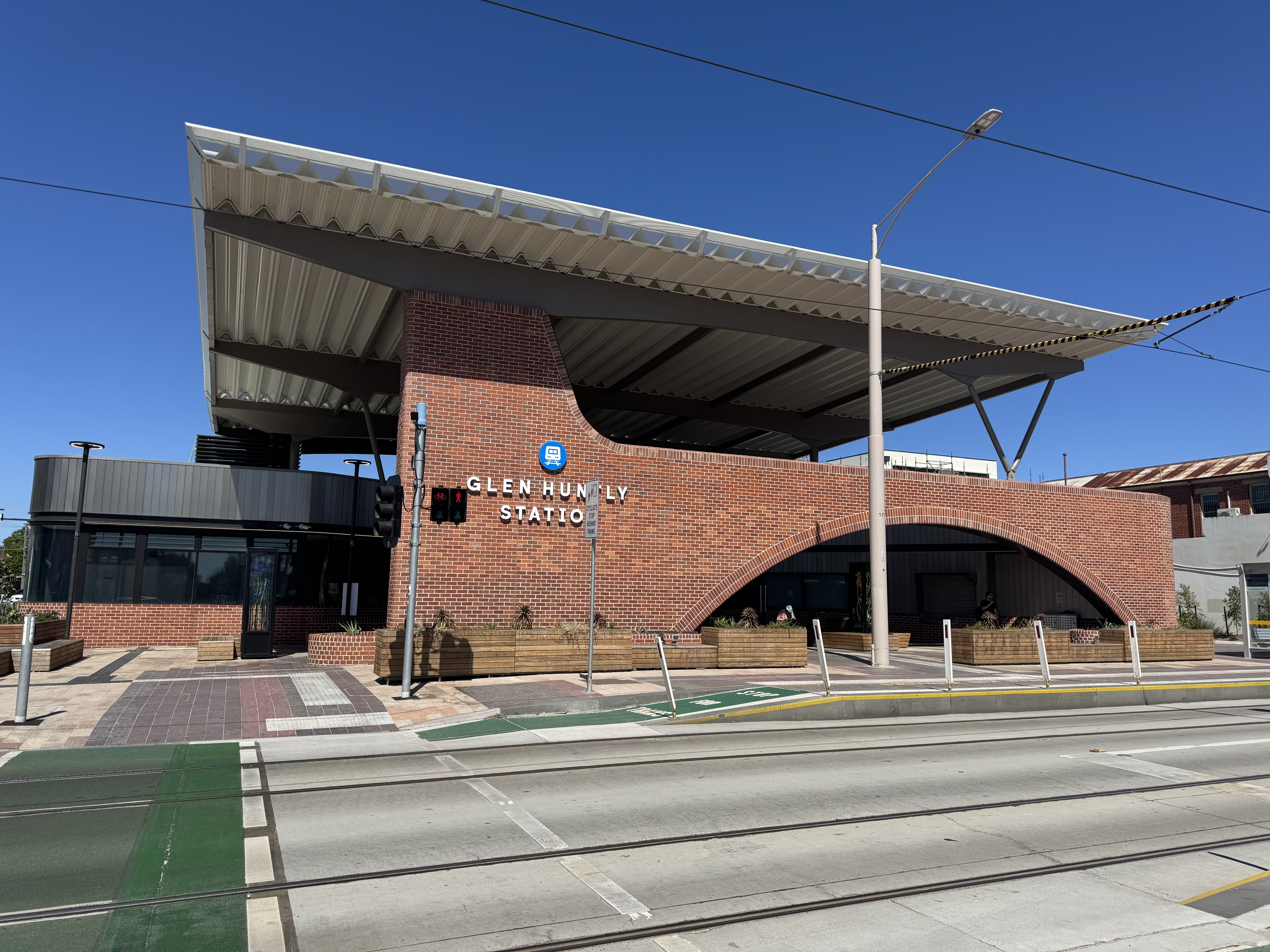
- Station building and entrance, March 2025

General information
- Location: Glen Huntly Road, Glen Huntly, Victoria 3163; City of Glen Eira; Australia
- Coordinates: 37°53′24″S 145°02′32″E
- System: PTV commuter rail station
- Owner: VicTrack
- Operator: Metro Trains
- Line: Frankston
- Distance: 13.46 kilometres from Southern Cross
- Platforms: 3 (1 side, 1 island)
- Tracks: 3
- Connections: Tram

Construction
- Structure type: Below-grade
- Parking: 190
- Accessible: Yes—step free access

Other information
- Status: Operational, host station
- Station code: GHY
- Fare zone: Myki zone 1
- Website: Public Transport Victoria

History
- Opened: 19 December 1881; 144 years ago
- Rebuilt: 1 July 1987; 31 July 2023 (LXRP)
- Electrified: March 1922 (1500 V DC overhead)
- Former names: Glen Huntly Road (1881-1882); Glen Huntly (1882-1937); Glenhuntly (1937-2023)

Passengers
- 2005-2006: 961,029
- 2006-2007: 1,081,400 ▲12.52%
- 2007-2008: 1,212,942 ▲12.16%
- 2008-2009: 1,341,142 ▲10.56%
- 2009-2010: 1,311,525 ▼2.2%
- 2010-2011: 1,202,272 ▼8.33%
- 2011-2012: 1,065,963 ▼11.33%
- 2012-2013: Not measured
- 2013-2014: 976,253 ▼8.41%
- 2014-2015: 964,574 ▼1.19%
- 2015-2016: 864,078 ▼10.41%
- 2016-2017: 932,804 ▲7.95%
- 2017-2018: 1,069,087 ▲14.61%
- 2018-2019: 960,477 ▼10.15%
- 2019-2020: 660,200 ▼31.26%
- 2020-2021: 335,400 ▼49.19%
- 2021–2022: 342,700 ▲2.17%
- 2022–2023: 319,350 ▼6.81%
- 2023–2024: 524,650 ▲64.29%
- 2023–2025: 641,550 ▲22.28%

Services
| Preceding station | Metro Trains | Following station |
|---|---|---|
| Caulfield towards Flinders Street via City Loop | Frankston line | Ormond towards Frankston |
Track layout
Location

Glen Huntly station is a railway station operated by Metro Trains Melbourne on the Frankston line, part of the Melbourne rail network. It serves the south-eastern suburb of Glen Huntly in Melbourne, Victoria, Australia.

The station had various forms of the name Glen Huntly, which it initially opened as "Glen Huntly Road" upon its opening in 1881. It was renamed to Glen Huntly a year later on 1 September 1882, it was then renamed to "Glenhuntly" on 20 April 1937. It was given its current name to "Glen Huntly" on 13 April 2023 as part of the Level Crossing Removal Project. Glen Huntly is a below ground host station, consisting of three platforms, a single island platform with two faces and a single side platform, connected by staircases, lifts and a ground level concourse on Glen Huntly Road. The station was previously at ground level upon its opening on 19 December 1881 until 31 March 2023; however, in July 2023, a new below ground station was provided and rebuilt as part of the Level Crossing Removal Project.

The station is served by one tram route, operated by Yarra Trams, it includes the route 67 tram. The station is approximately 11 km (6.8 mi) or around 25 minute train ride to Flinders Street.

Prior to grade separation, the station was located next to a tram square, one of only three remaining level crossings in Melbourne at which tram and train tracks intersect at the time of closure. A small signal box was located at the Flinders Street end of the tram square, which historically controlled the tramway crossing.

== Description ==
Glen Huntly station is located in the suburb of Glen Huntly in Melbourne, Victoria, Australia. On the east side of the station is Station Place northbound of Glen Huntly Road and Royal Avenue southbound of Glen Huntly Road and Etna Street on the west side. The station is owned by VicTrack, a state government agency and is operated by Metro Trains Melbourne. The station is approximately 11 km (6.8 mi) or around 25 minute train ride to Flinders Street station.

Glen Huntly consists of three platforms, an island platform with two faces and one side platform which is located beneath the road and is connected to the Glen Huntly Road building and concourse via stairs and escalators. The length of the platform is approximately 160 metres (520 ft), long enough for a 7-car High Capacity Metro Train.

The main car park at the station is located in between Glen Huntly Road and Neerim Road, north of the station. The station fully complies with the Disability Discrimination Act 1992 as there is a lift that connects to the station entrance with Platforms 1, 2 and 3.

== History ==
Glen Huntly station opened on 19 December 1881, when the railway line from Caulfield was extended to Mordialloc. Like the suburb itself, the station was named after the ship Glen Huntly, which docked at Point Ormond (then known as Little Red Bluff) on 7 April 1840 with typhus fever onboard. A track leading to the Point and subsequent quarantine station was later named Glen Huntly Road.

During March/April 1975, the former briquette depot at the station was demolished.

In the mid 1980s, as part of works to add a third track on the Frankston line, the western platform was converted to an island platform. The original station building on this platform, built in the 1880s, was demolished. It was replaced with a brick building, which was opened on 1 July 1987 by the then Minister for Transport Tom Roper, and former Member for Glenhuntly Dr. Gerard Vaughan. It was also during this time that boom barriers were provided at the former Glen Huntly Road and the nearby Neerim Road level crossings, in 1986 and 1987 respectively. On 28 June 1987, the up face of the island platform was brought into use.

== Level Crossing Removal Project ==
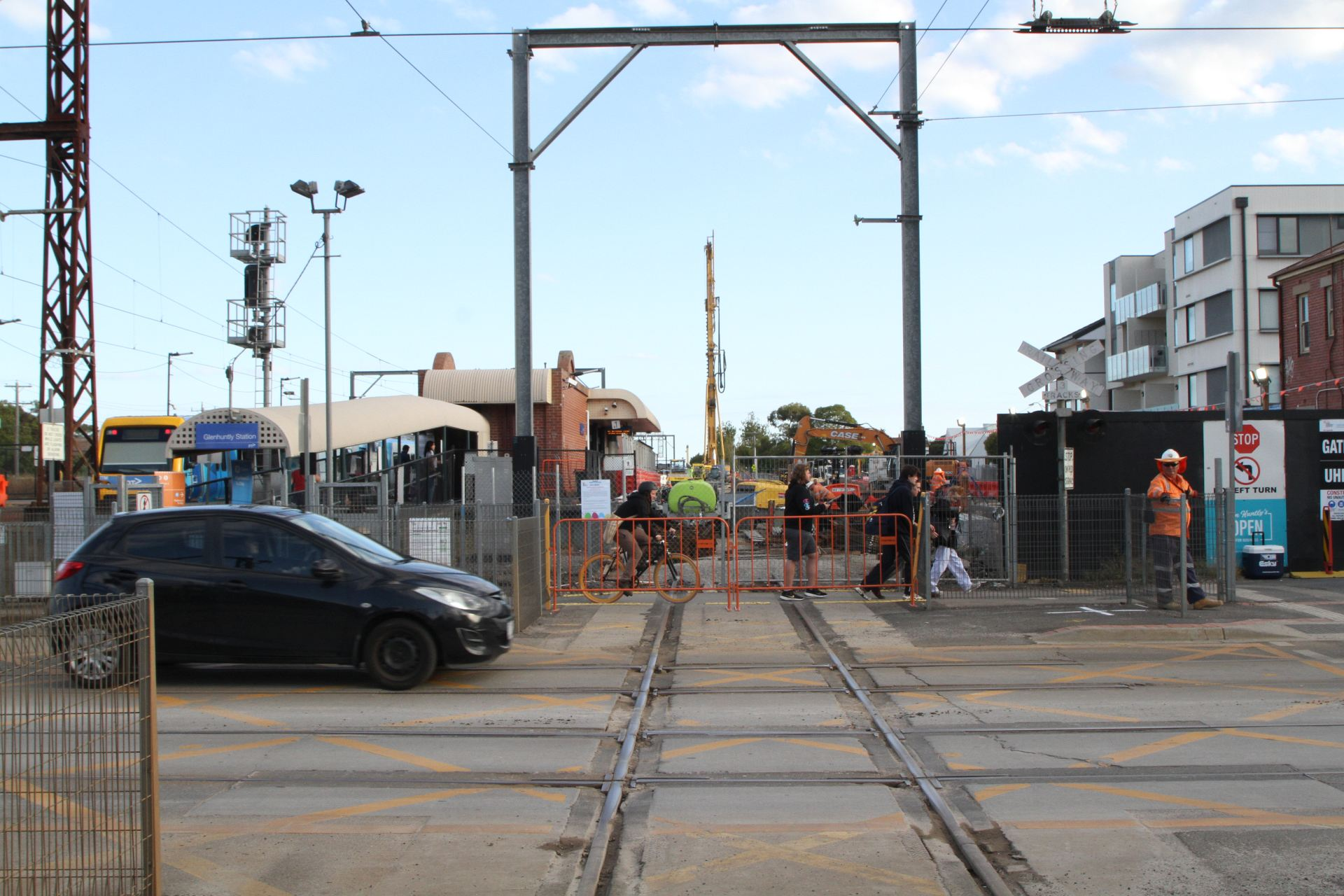
The third track removed at the former Glen Huntly Road level crossing for level crossing removal works, March 2023

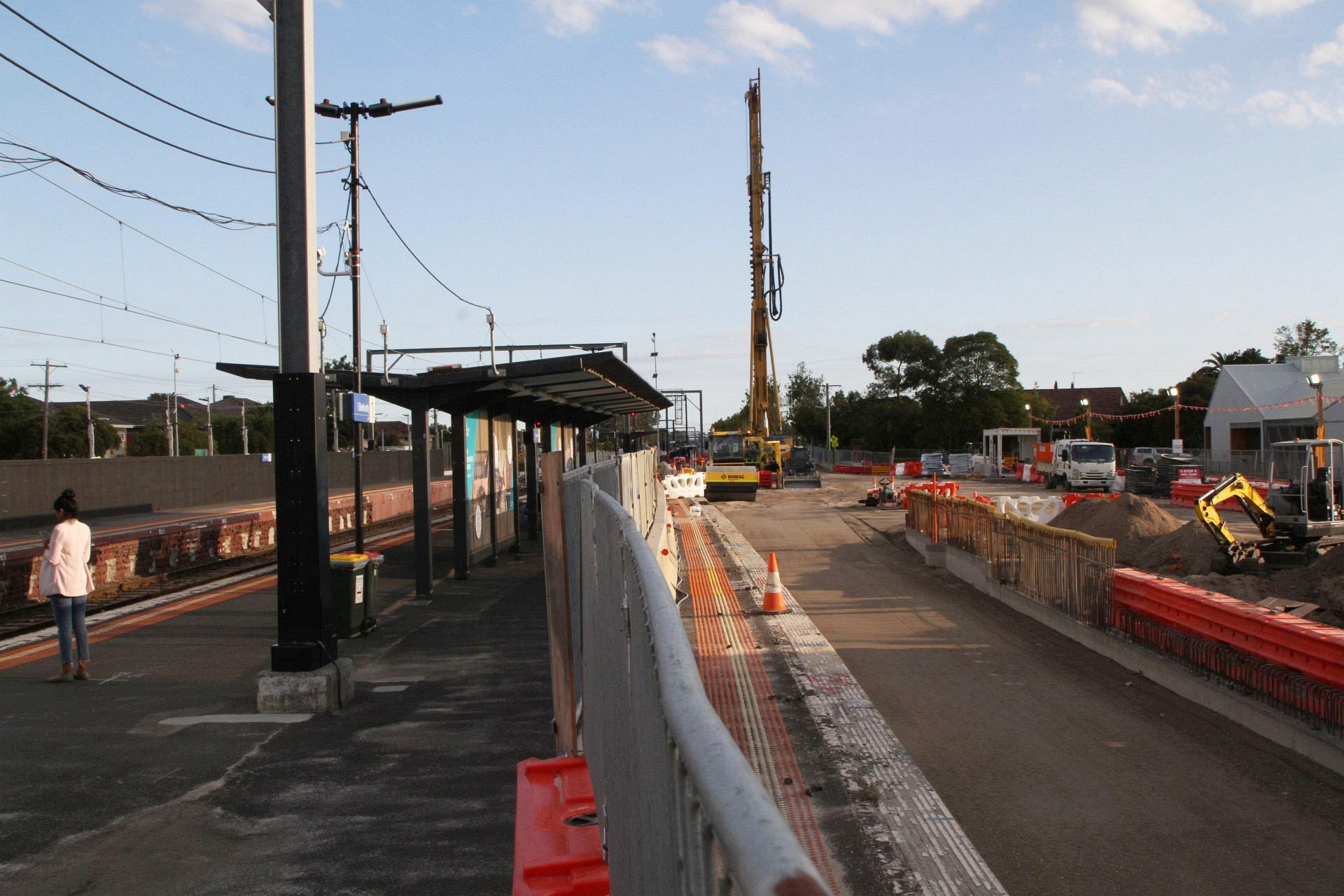
Southbound view from the former ground level Platform 1, with the railway tracks removed due to the level crossing removal works, March 2023

On 30 November 2018, the Level Crossing Removal Project announced that the Glen Huntly Road and Neerim Road level crossings would be grade separated, with the project expected to be completed by 2024. On 21 June 2021, designs for the rebuilt station were revealed, showing that the level crossings will be removed by lowering the railway line into an approximate 1 km (0.62 mi) trench. The last train stopped at the ground level station on the evening of 31 March 2023 with the station demolished in the following days. The new station was opened to the public on 31 July 2023.

== Platforms and services ==
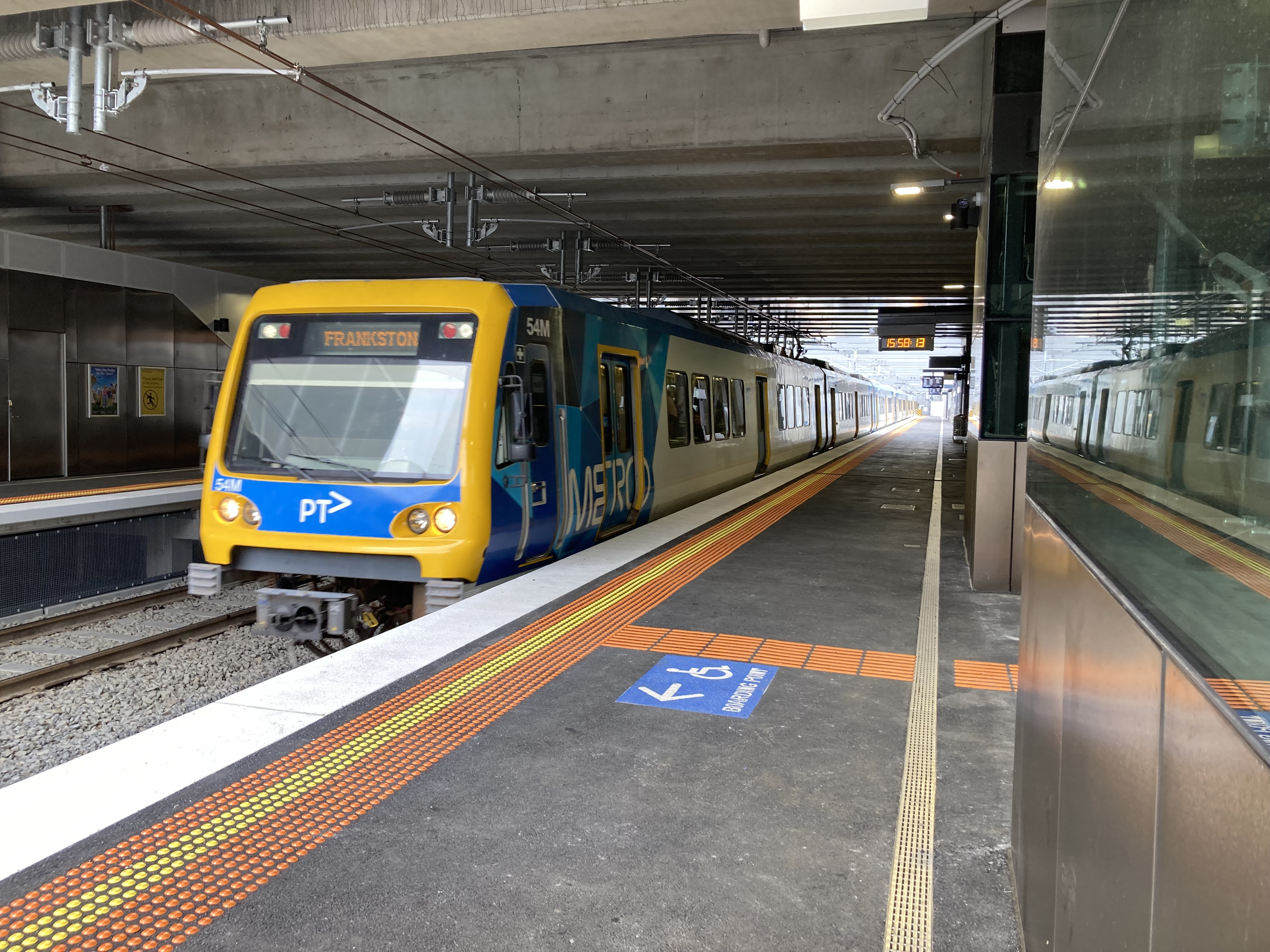
An X'Trapolis train on a Frankston–bound service arrives at Platform 3, October 2023

Prior to closure for the Glen Huntly Road level crossing removal, Glen Huntly had one island platform with two faces, and one side platform. During the morning peak-hour period, Frankston-bound services used Platform 3 and Flinders Street services use Platform 1. Platform 2, during the morning peak-hour, is used for express services which mostly don't stop at Glen Huntly. In the evening peak-hour period, Frankston-bound services use Platform 2 whilst express services pass the station through Platform 3.

When the station was reconstructed and reopened in July 2023, the one island and one side platform configuration was retained with the same platform numbering. Flinders Street services resumed using platform 1 while Frankston-bound services began to use Platform 3 only. Platform 2 is not regularly used, with non-stopping express trains passing the platform in the peak hour. However, the platform is bi-directional and can be used by both Flinders Street and Frankston-bound services if required.

The station is currently served by the Frankston line, which is operated by Metro Trains Melbourne. The Frankston line runs from Frankston station south east of Melbourne, joining the Cranbourne and Pakenham lines at Caulfield station before continuing into the City Loop.

Glen Huntly platform arrangement
| Platform | Line | Destination | Via | Service Type | Notes | Source |
|---|---|---|---|---|---|---|
| 1 | Frankston line | Flinders Street | City Loop | All stations and limited express services | | |
| 2 | Frankston line | | | | Services may occasionally stop at this platform. Peak hour services run express through this station. | |
| 3 | Frankston line | Frankston, Mordialloc, Cheltenham or Carrum | | All stations | | |

== Transport links ==
Glen Huntly is served by one tram route, including the route 67 operated by Yarra Trams, departing from the Glen Huntly Road low floor tram stop platforms, although as the route 67 is currently serviced only by Z and B class trams no low floor trams serve this stop, heading westbound and eastbound. It is located southbound above the station, next to the southern station entrance.

=== Glen Huntly Road ===
- : Melbourne University – Carnegie

== Gallery ==
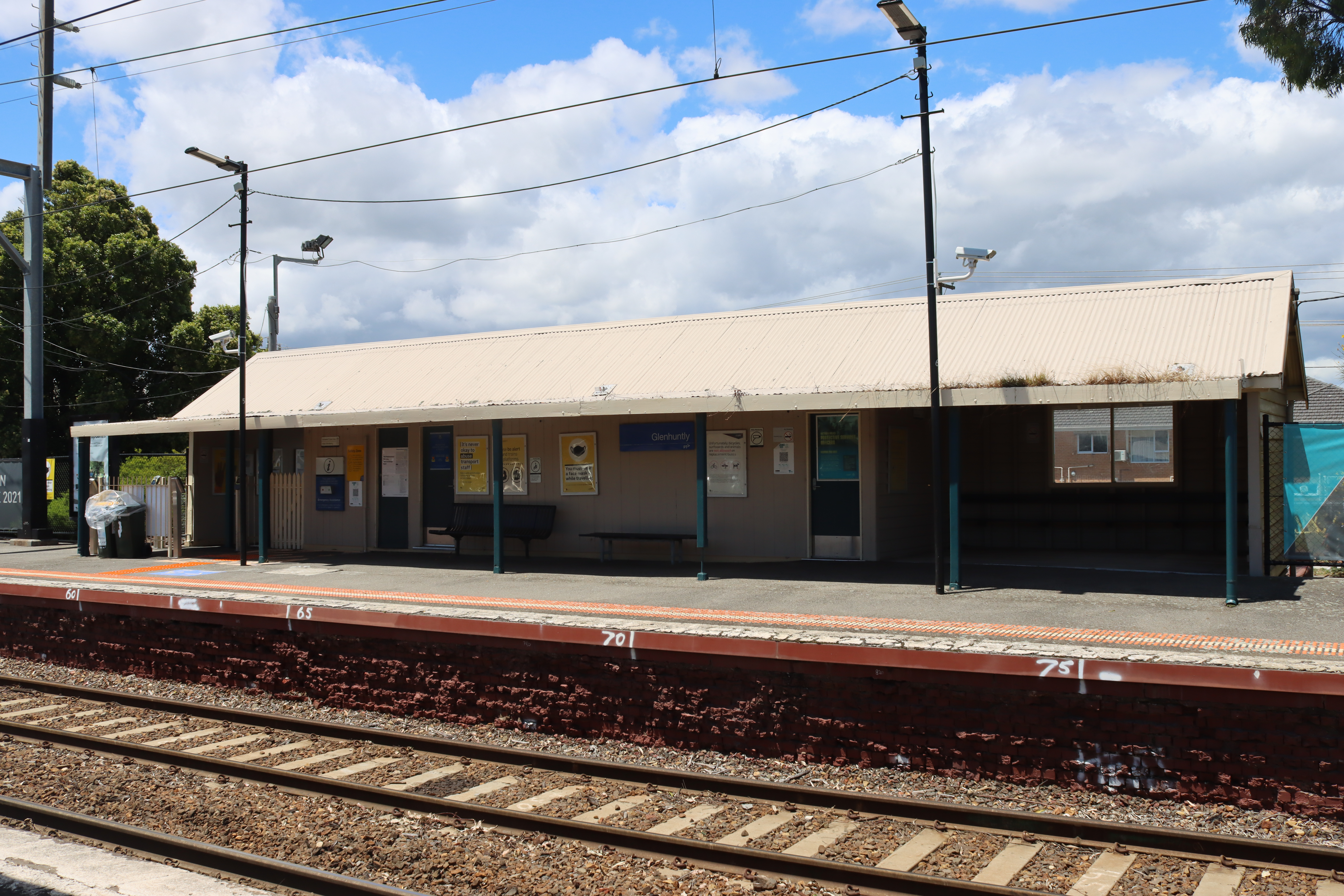
Former ground level weatherboard station building on Platform 3, December 2021

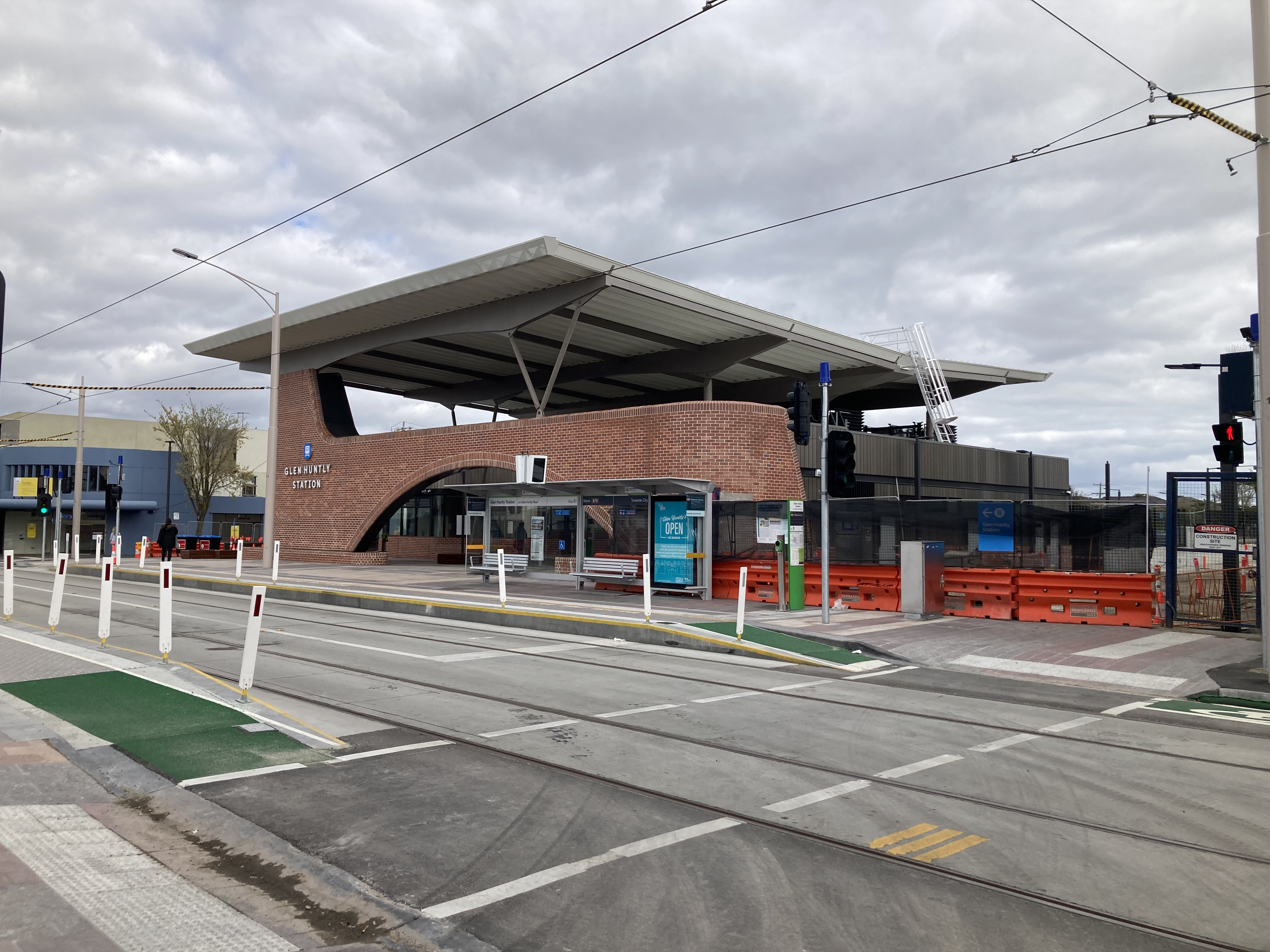
Station entrance and building from Glen Huntly Road and Route 67 tram stop, October 2023

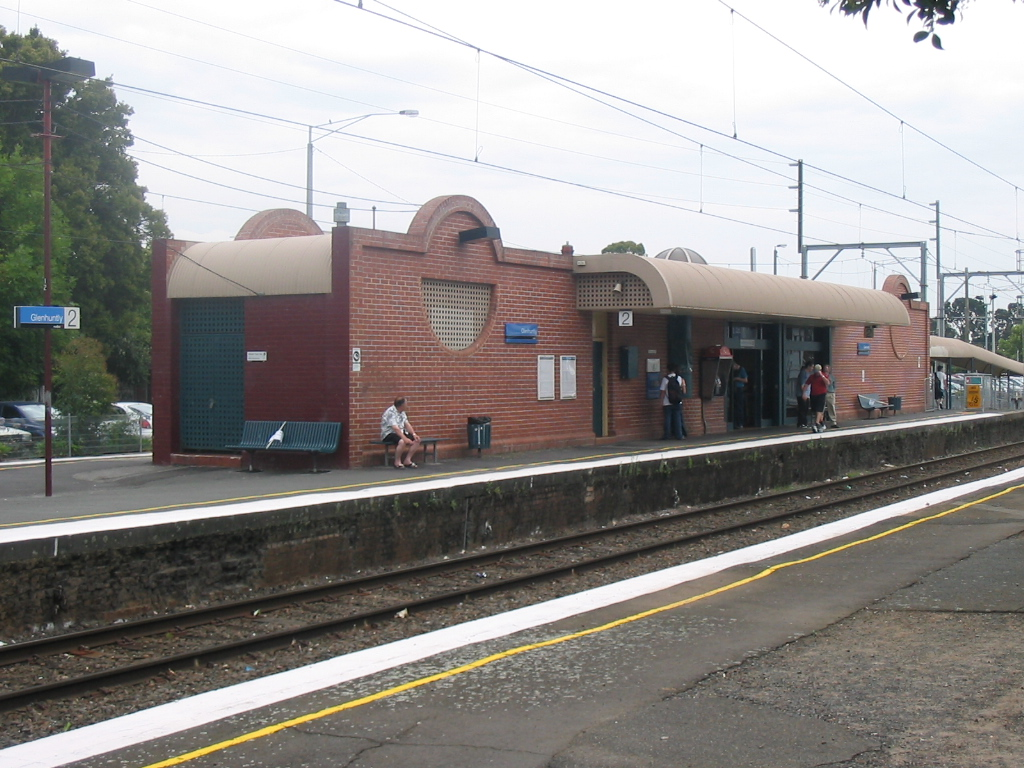
The former ground level 1980s brick station building on Platforms 1 and 2, January 2006
