= List of Western Bulldogs coaches =

The following is a list of coaches who have coached the Western Bulldogs, previously known as Footscray, at a game of Australian rules football in the Australian Football League (AFL), formerly the VFL.

== VFL/AFL ==
No.	Coach	P	W	L	D	W%	Years
1	Con McCarthy	17	4	13	0	23.53	1925
2	Harry Saunders	10	3	7	0	30.00	1926
3	Jim Cassidy	8	1	7	0	12.50	1926
4	Paddy Scanlan	36	15	21	0	41.67	1927–28
5	Alec Eason	18	6	11	1	36.11	1929
6	Allan Hopkins	18	4	14	0	22.22	1930
7	Bill Cubbins	54	32	22	0	59.26	1931–33
8	Alby Morrison	22	6	16	0	27.27	1934–35
9	Syd Coventry	36	8	26	2	25.00	1935–37
10	Joe Kelly	69	29	40	0	42.03	1937–40
11	Norman Ware	33	20	13	0	60.61	1941–42
12	Arthur Olliver	131	68	62	1	52.29	1943–50
13	Jim Crowe	19	8	10	1	44.74	1947
14	Charlie Sutton	162	81	79	2	50.62	1951–57, 1967–68
15	George McLaren	1	1	0	0	100.00	1951
16	Wally Donald	3	2	1	0	66.67	1952, 1953
17	Ted Whitten	228	91	137	0	39.91	1957–66 1969–71
18	Joe Ryan	2	0	2	0	0.00	1959, 1960
19	Bill Findlay	5	2	3	0	40.00	1961–62, 1964, 1966
20	Bob Rose	89	42	45	2	48.31	1972–75
21	Bill Goggin	46	21	23	2	47.83	1976–78
22	Don McKenzie	44	14	29	1	31.81	1978–79, 1982
23	Royce Hart	53	8	45	0	15.09	1980–82
24	Frank Goode	1	0	1	0	0.00	1981
25	Ian Hampshire	33	12	21	0	36.36	1982–83
26	Mick Malthouse	135	67	66	2	50.37	1984–89
27	Terry Wheeler	91	50	40	1	55.49	1990–94
28	Alan Joyce	57	25	30	2	45.61	1994–96
29	Terry Wallace	148	79	67	2	54.05	1996–2002
30	Peter Rohde	45	9	35	1	21.11	2002–04
31	Rodney Eade	162	88	72	2	54.94	2005–2011
32	Paul Williams	3	2	1	0	66.67	2011
33	Brendan McCartney	66	20	46	0	30.30	2012–14
34	Luke Beveridge	253	144	109	0	56.92	2015 -

- Statistics are correct as of Round 15, 2024

Key:

P = Played
W = Won
L = Lost
D = Drew
W% = Win percentage

== AFL Women's ==
Season(s)	Coach	Notes
2017–2019	Paul Groves	2018 premiership coach
2020–2023	Nathan Burke	
2024–	Tamara Hyett	
