= List of Western Bulldogs captains =

This is a list of all captains of the Western Bulldogs, an Australian rules football club in the Australian Football League (AFL) and AFL Women's.

== VFL/AFL ==
Dates	Captain(s)	Notes
1926	Allan Hopkins	
1927–1928	Paddy Scanlan	
1929–1930	Allan Hopkins	
1931–1932	Bill Cubbins	
1933	Ivan McAlpine	
1934	Bill Cubbins; Alby Morrison	
1935	Alby Morrison	
1936	Stan Penberthy	
1937	Sid Dockendorff; Alby Morrison	
1938–1939	Roy Evans	
1940–1942	Norman Ware	
1943–1946	Arthur Olliver	
1947	Harry Hickey	
1948–1950	Arthur Olliver	
1951–1955	Charlie Sutton	1954 Premiership Captain
1956	Charlie Sutton; Wally Donald	
1957	Harvey Stevens; Ted Whitten	Ted Whitten Longest Serving Captain
1958–1969	Ted Whitten	Longest Serving Captain
1970	Ted Whitten; Stuart Magee	Ted Whitten Longest Serving Captain
1971–1972	Gary Dempsey	
1973	David Thorpe	
1974–1976	Laurie Sandilands	
1977–1978	Gary Dempsey	
1979–1981	Geoff Jennings	
1982	Kelvin Templeton	
1983–1985	Jim Edmond	
1986–1988	Rick Kennedy	
1989	Stephen Wallis	
1990–1993	Doug Hawkins	
1994–2000	Scott Wynd	
2001–2004	Chris Grant	
2005–2006	Luke Darcy	
2007–2010	Brad Johnson	
2011–2013	Matthew Boyd	
2014	Ryan Griffen	
2015–2017	Bob Murphy	
2018–2019	Easton Wood	2016 premiership captain
2020–	Marcus Bontempelli	

== AFL Women's ==
Dates	Captain(s)	Notes
2017–2018	Katie Brennan	Ellie Blackburn was premiership captain in 2018 in Brennan's absence.
2019	Katie Brennan; Ellie Blackburn	Co-captains
2020-present	Ellie Blackburn	
