= Scott West =

Australian rules footballer (born 1974)

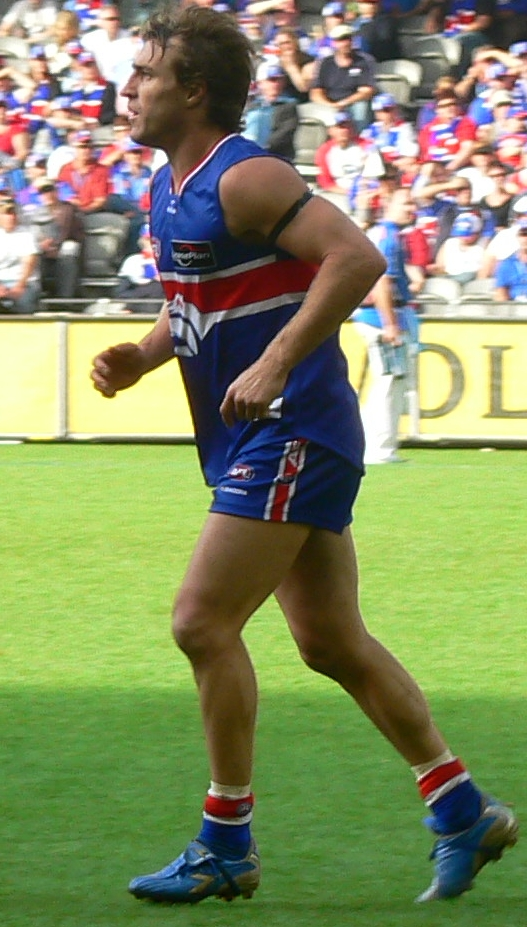

Personal information
- Born: 14 November 1974 (age 51); Swan Reach, South Australia
- Original team: Strathmore
- Debut: Round 1, 1993, Footscray vs. Collingwood, at Melbourne Cricket Ground
- Height: 178 cm (5 ft 10 in)
- Weight: 80 kg (176 lb)
- Position: Midfielder

Playing career^{1}
Years	Club	Games (Goals)
1993–2008	Western Bulldogs/Footscray	324 (104)

Coaching career^{3}
Years	Club	Games (W–L–D)
2012–2013	Werribee	36 (22–14–0)
- ^{1} Playing statistics correct to the end of 2008.^{3} Coaching statistics correct as of 2013.

Career highlights
- 7× Charles Sutton Medal (1995, 1997, 1998, 2000, 2003, 2004, 2005); 5× All-Australian team (1998, 2000, 2004, 2005, 2006); Australian Football Hall of Fame; Represented Victoria (1999); Lou Richards Medal (2006); AFL Rising Star nominee (1993)

Scott West (born 14 November 1974) is a former Australian rules footballer who represented the Western Bulldogs in the Australian Football League (AFL). Having won a club-record seven Charlie Sutton Medals, West is recognised as one of the Bulldogs' greatest-ever players. A tough "in-and-under" midfielder who was hard at the ball, especially around the stoppages, West was regularly among the league's most prolific ballwinners during his playing career.

== Early career ==
One of three brothers, West grew up in the northwestern Melbourne suburb of Keilor a keen Essendon supporter. Ironically, his childhood neighbour and future Essendon footballer Rick Olarenshaw was a Footscray supporter. His older brother Troy initially trained at Essendon until told the West family residence actually belonged to Footscray's recruiting zone. Troy would go on to have a fine career with Victorian Football Association (VFA) club Williamstown. The third brother, Brent, is Scott's twin.

West was educated at Penleigh and Essendon Grammar School (PEGS), whom he represented in football with the Associated Grammar Schools of Victoria (AGSV) First XVIII in 1991 and 1992 along with Shane Crawford and future teammate Paul Dimattina.

West also played for Strathmore and was subsequently recruited by Footscray (now Western Bulldogs), making his senior debut in 1993. He won an AFL Rising Star nomination that season. In 1993 and 1994 West wore the number 14 guernsey, before changing to his famous number 7 in the wake of Doug Hawkins' departure to Fitzroy in 1995 .

== AFL career ==
After Footscray rebranded itself the Western Bulldogs during the tumultuous 1996 season, the Bulldogs rebounded dramatically in 1997, falling short of their first Grand Final appearance since 1961 when the eventual premiers Adelaide came from behind to win the Preliminary Final by two points. West's contribution in the club's turnaround was recognised when he won the second of what would be seven Charlie Sutton Medals. He made All-Australian selection on five occasions – in 1998, 2000, 2004, 2005 and 2006. West's victory in 2005 saw him overtake Gary Dempsey's previous record of six.

Late in 2006 West had been described as being in the best form of his career despite him being 32 years of age and completing his 300th game. This run of form included an incredible career best 45 disposals in one match against the Adelaide Crows. In the 2006 season, West became the first player on record (recorded since 1987) to amass more than 400 handpasses in a season, finishing with 423.

West finished runner-up in the Brownlow Medal count twice: in 2000 and in 2006; in the former year, he was particularly unlucky: going into the final round, he was level with Melbourne's Shane Woewodin on 22 votes. Having had only 17 disposals and being interchanged for majority of the final quarter, Woewodin wasn't considered a chance to poll against West Coast, however Woewodin polled two votes to win the medal with 24 votes. In 2006, he won the Sunday Footy Show's Lou Richards award for best player as voted by Channel 9's football commentators. He was the crowd favourite to win the Brownlow Medal in 2006, due to his string of close misses and secondly, because he was one of the few Victoria-based players with a high chance of winning the award, during a period when non-Victorian teams were dominating the league. West ended up finishing second in 2006 behind Adam Goodes.

West and Rohan Smith played their 300th games in the Bulldogs' semi-final loss to West Coast at Domain Stadium on 16 September 2006. To date, they are the only pair of teammates to share their 300th AFL game in the same match. The pair had previously shared their 150th and 200th matches together, with the Bulldogs winning on both occasions.

On 23 September 2008, his career came to an end after the Bulldogs said he was no longer required at the club.

== Post-playing career ==
West is a qualified landscape gardener and has run a landscaping business since 1997. He is currently working in the construction industry in Melbourne.

From 2009 to 2011, West served as a midfield coach at Melbourne, earning praise for his teaching ability.

In 2012 he became the coach of the Werribee Football Club in the Victorian Football League (VFL). His stint was short but reasonably successful, leading Werribee to consecutive Preliminary Finals before quitting after the 2013 season in the hope of landing a coaching role in the AFL.

In October 2014, West was among the candidates considered to replace Brendan McCartney as senior coach of the Bulldogs, but the position eventually was given to Luke Beveridge.

West has also been working as a football commentator on radio for the Australian Broadcasting Commission (ABC).

West has made several appearances on the AFL Footy Show and appeared on a pizza ad with Melbourne's David Neitz.

== Honours ==
In early 2002, West was named in the Western Bulldogs Team of the Century.

The Scott West Award, awarded to the Western Bulldogs' most courageous player during a season, was named in his honour.

In 2013 West was inducted into the Australian Football Hall of Fame.

In March 2017, West was chosen as one of the club icons to unfurl the Bulldogs' premiership flag.

== Career statistics ==
Legend
G	Goals	K	Kicks	D	Disposals	T	Tackles
B	Behinds	H	Handballs	M	Marks
†	Led the league for the season

Season	Team	No.	Games	Totals							Averages (per game)							Votes
Season	Team	No.	Games	G	B	K	H	D	M	T	G	B	K	H	D	M	T	Votes
1993	Footscray	14	17	21	15	170	119	289	36	35	1.2	0.9	10.0	7.0	17.0	2.1	2.1	8
1994	Footscray	14	23	9	11	338	155	493	51	38	0.4	0.5	14.7	6.7	21.4	2.2	1.7	2
1995	Footscray	7	23	6	13	365	182	547	46	45	0.3	0.6	15.9	7.9	23.8	2.0	2.0	9
1996	Footscray	7	15	0	4	137	128	265	21	23	0.0	0.3	9.1	8.5	17.7	1.4	1.5	1
1997	Western Bulldogs	7	24	5	3	367	240	607	58	57	0.2	0.1	15.3	10.0	25.3	2.4	2.4	5
1998	Western Bulldogs	7	24	5	3	309	301^{†}	610	40	67	0.2	0.1	12.9	12.5^{†}	25.4	1.7	2.8	23
1999	Western Bulldogs	7	21	11	5	244	268	512	47	40	0.5	0.2	11.6	12.8	24.4	2.2	1.9	14
2000	Western Bulldogs	7	23	7	5	331	326^{†}	657	80	51	0.3	0.2	14.4	14.2^{†}	28.6	3.5	2.2	22
2001	Western Bulldogs	7	22	11	4	283	298	581	72	59	0.5	0.2	12.9	13.5^{†}	26.4	3.3	2.7	8
2002	Western Bulldogs	7	18	8	8	222	249	471	61	57	0.4	0.4	12.3	13.8^{†}	26.2^{†}	3.4	3.2	8
2003	Western Bulldogs	7	22	3	6	277	343^{†}	620	107	67	0.1	0.3	12.6	15.6^{†}	28.2^{†}	4.9	3.0	4
2004	Western Bulldogs	7	22	7	10	278	314	592	104	80	0.3	0.5	12.6	14.3	26.9^{†}	4.7	3.6	20
2005	Western Bulldogs	7	22	4	7	267	370	637^{†}	91	61	0.2	0.3	12.1	16.8	29.0^{†}	4.1	2.8	17
2006	Western Bulldogs	7	24	6	5	285	423^{†}	708^{†}	119	77	0.3	0.2	11.9	17.6^{§}	29.5^{†}	5.0	3.2	23
2007	Western Bulldogs	7	20	1	6	211	329	540	110	82	0.1	0.3	10.6	16.5^{†}	27.0	5.5	4.1	8
2008	Western Bulldogs	7	4	0	0	45	48	93	14	14	0.0	0.0	11.3	12.0	23.3	3.5	3.5	3
Career			324	104	105	4129	4093	8222	1057	853	0.3	0.3	12.7	12.6	25.4	3.3	2.6	175

== Personal life ==
West and wife LeShelle have four sons: Rhylee (born 2000) twins Cooper and Cobi (born 2003) and Levi (born 2008). Rhylee was drafted by the Western Bulldogs in 2018 as a father-son selection.
