= Matthew Boyd (Australian footballer) =

Australian rules footballer (born 1982)

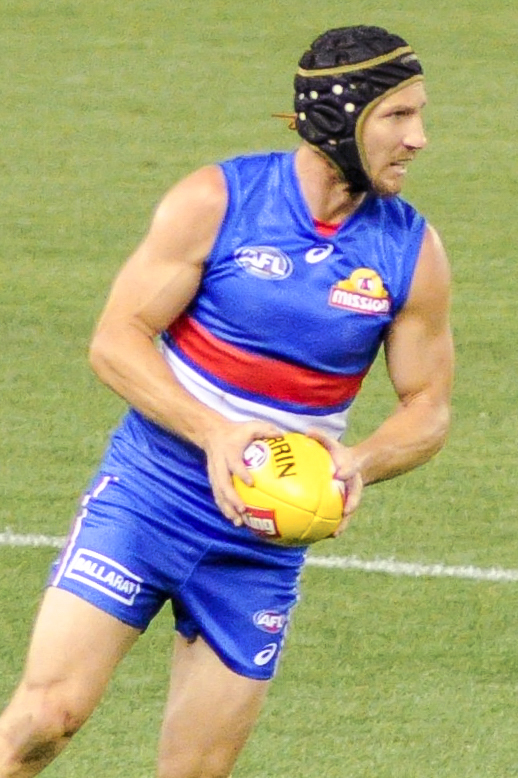
- Boyd playing in March 2017.

Personal information
- Full name: Matthew Keith Boyd
- Nickname: Boydy
- Born: 27 August 1982 (age 44)
- Original teams: Frankston (VFL); Dandenong Stingrays (TAC Cup)
- Draft: No. 23, 2002 rookie draft
- Height: 184 cm (6 ft 0 in)
- Weight: 88 kg (194 lb)
- Position: Defender / midfielder

Playing career^{1}
Years	Club	Games (Goals)
2003–2017	Western Bulldogs	292 (86)

International team honours^{2}
Years	Team	Games (Goals)
2008–2010	Australia	4
- ^{1} Playing statistics correct to the end of 2017.^{2} Representative statistics correct as of 2010.

Career highlights
- AFL premiership player: 2016; 3× Charles Sutton Medal: 2009, 2011, 2012; 3× All-Australian team: 2009, 2011, 2016; Western Bulldogs captain: 2011–2013; Pre-season premiership player: 2010; Bob Rose–Charlie Sutton Medal: 2007

Matthew Keith Boyd (born 27 August 1982) is a former professional Australian rules footballer who played for the Western Bulldogs in the Australian Football League (AFL). Before joining the Bulldogs, Boyd had played for Dandenong Stingrays in the TAC Cup and Frankston in the VFL. Boyd is the grand nephew of Australian football vendor icon Johnny Boyd, known as the Peanut Man.

== Playing career ==
Boyd made his AFL debut against Fremantle in Round 7 of the 2003 AFL season. The occasion was not a happy one, as the Bulldogs were thrashed by 83 points, eventually finishing the season at the bottom of the ladder. He was able to consolidate a position in the senior team during 2004. Rodney Eade's arrival as coach in 2005 signalled a change in fortune for the Bulldogs; during his tenure, the Bulldogs would reach the Preliminary Final in three consecutive seasons (2008, 2009 and 2010). Boyd was one of the key players in the Bulldogs' resurgence, playing much of his best football under Eade, whom he later credited with saving his career. He wore the number 42 until 2007 when he took the number 5 from Rohan Smith who retired at the end of 2006.

In 2009, Boyd was rewarded for a strong season with selection in the 2009 All-Australian Team & winning his first Charles Sutton Medal, the Bulldogs' annual best and fairest award.

On 21 January 2011, he was announced as the new captain for the Western Bulldogs. Boyd relished the Bulldogs captaincy and continued his good form and was rewarded with his second All-Australian selection and second Charlie Sutton Medal.

Boyd retained the captaincy when Brendan McCartney took over as coach for the 2012 AFL season, and as the emphasis was on list rejuvenation (Boyd by this time was an established AFL veteran), he was used more in run-with roles. An illustrative example of this was in Round 13 against Richmond in 2013; although the Bulldogs lost by 60 points, Boyd won his duel with Trent Cotchin, restricting the Richmond captain to 17 disposals while he accumulated twice as many disposals. A broken cheekbone and calf injury limited Boyd to 13 games during the 2013 AFL season, and at the end of the season, he relinquished the club captaincy to Ryan Griffen, who had captained the Bulldogs in 2013 during Boyd's absence.

Boyd's importance to the young playing group on and off the field was recognised with a new one-year contract in July 2014, which he signed in September. On 9 October Griffen, who had only been captain for one season, sensationally requested—and was later traded—to Greater Western Sydney in exchange for Tom Boyd. He revealed later that the pressure of captaincy and the extra media attention almost persuaded him to quit the sport altogether. The following day, it was announced that McCartney had resigned as coach due to player discontent. In November, Luke Beveridge was appointed as the Bulldogs' new senior coach and fellow veteran Bob Murphy was appointed captain the following week.

During the 2015 season, the Bulldogs' player list management had contemplated delisting Boyd along with fellow veteran Dale Morris at the end of the season. But Beveridge objected to the idea, insisting that both players still had much to contribute by way of experience. The Bulldogs announced one-year extensions for both Boyd and Morris in the lead up to the Elimination Final against Adelaide, which the Bulldogs began well but ended up losing by seven points.

In 2016, Boyd was recognized for another outstanding season with his third selection in the All Australian team; he averaged 27 possessions per game with a kicking efficiency of 77 percent. In addition, his leadership in defense was crucial in a season where the Bulldogs struggled with injury, losing captain Bob Murphy to a serious knee injury in Round 3, and Jason Johannisen, Easton Wood and Dale Morris all suffering hamstring injuries at various stages of the season. Despite the shocking run with injuries, the Bulldogs managed to qualify for the finals with 15 wins.

Finishing the home-and-away season in seventh position, the Bulldogs defeated the previous season's runner-up West Coast in Perth in 47-point win to advance out of the first round, prevailed over Hawthorn, the winner of the last three premierships, and defeated premiership favorite Greater Western Sydney in the preliminary finals to reach their first Grand Final since 1961. They would then go on to break their 62-year championship drought and claim the premiership in a game which many AFL fans regard as one of the most memorable Grand Finals in recent history. Boyd was rated among the Bulldogs' best players in the series, gathering 27 disposals and rebounding from the opposition 50 seven times. Two weeks after the momentous victory, he confirmed after some speculation that he would play on the following season by signing a new one-year contract.

In 2017 in the Bulldogs' final pre-season match against Gold Coast, Boyd sustained an accidental injury when Peter Wright made contact with the elbow to his right ear. The impact caused a tear which required reconstructive surgery. After the surgery, Boyd trained in protective headgear in a bid to be ready for the Round 1 match at the MCG against Collingwood. Boyd formally announced his retirement on 8 August. Boyd played the final game of his career in round 23 where he collected 33 disposals and 1 goal in a 9-point loss to Hawthorn.

== Coaching career ==
In September 2017, just weeks after his final AFL game, Boyd was appointed by Collingwood as a development coach as part of the club's academy program.

In October 2020, Boyd was appointed by Fremantle as an assistant coach.

== Statistics ==
Legend
G	Goals	K	Kicks	D	Disposals	T	Tackles
B	Behinds	H	Handballs	M	Marks

Season	Team	No.	Games	Totals							Averages (per game)						
Season	Team	No.	Games	G	B	K	H	D	M	T	G	B	K	H	D	M	T
2003	Western Bulldogs	42	8	3	3	25	32	57	12	9	0.4	0.4	3.1	4.0	7.1	1.5	1.1
2004	Western Bulldogs	42	19	1	2	136	119	255	91	41	0.1	0.1	7.2	6.3	13.4	4.8	2.2
2005	Western Bulldogs	42	17	5	4	120	109	229	66	35	0.3	0.2	7.1	6.4	13.5	3.9	2.1
2006	Western Bulldogs	42	24	9	5	245	233	478	132	89	0.4	0.2	10.2	9.7	19.9	5.5	3.7
2007	Western Bulldogs	5	22	11	8	295	250	545	137	77	0.5	0.4	13.4	11.4	24.8	6.2	3.5
2008	Western Bulldogs	5	25	5	6	315	314	629	133	94	0.2	0.2	12.6	12.6	25.2	5.3	3.8
2009	Western Bulldogs	5	25	15	5	328	394	722	120	90	0.6	0.2	13.1	15.8	28.9	4.8	3.6
2010	Western Bulldogs	5	23	8	10	393	304	697	107	106	0.3	0.4	17.1	13.2	30.3	4.7	4.6
2011	Western Bulldogs	5	22	8	5	398	303	701	85	113	0.4	0.2	18.1	13.8	31.9	3.9	5.1
2012	Western Bulldogs	5	22	6	9	374	347	721	112	87	0.3	0.4	17.0	15.8	32.8	5.1	4.0
2013	Western Bulldogs	5	13	4	2	196	186	382	61	51	0.3	0.2	15.1	14.3	29.4	4.7	3.9
2014	Western Bulldogs	5	19	7	11	249	249	498	69	82	0.4	0.6	13.1	13.1	26.2	3.6	4.3
2015	Western Bulldogs	5	19	1	6	321	195	516	148	40	0.1	0.3	16.9	10.3	27.2	7.8	2.1
2016^{#}	Western Bulldogs	5	24	0	1	407	246	653	161	49	0.0	0.0	17.0	10.3	27.2	6.7	2.0
2017	Western Bulldogs	5	10	3	2	133	97	230	57	16	0.3	0.2	13.3	9.7	23.0	5.7	1.6
Career			292	86	79	3935	3378	7313	1491	979	0.3	0.3	13.5	11.6	25.0	5.1	3.4

== Honours and achievements ==
- Team
  - AFL premiership: 2016
  - Western Bulldogs captain: 2011-2013
  - Pre-season premiership player: 2010
- Individual
  - AFL Life Membership : (2017)
  - 3× All-Australian: 2009, 2011, 2016
  - 3× Charles Sutton Medal (Western Bulldogs B&F): 2009, 2011, 2012
  - Brad Johnson Best Team Player : (2016)
  - Bob Rose–Charlie Sutton Medal: 2007

== Personal life ==
Boyd grew up in the south-eastern Melbourne suburb of Narre Warren and was educated at Mazenod College. He married Kate Jones in October 2007. In 2011 the couple had their first child, a daughter.

Boyd possesses a Master of Business Administration.
