= Allan Collins (Australian rules footballer) =

Australian rules footballer, born 1919

Personal information
- Born: 4 November 1919
- Died: 19 September 2006 (aged 86)
- Original team: Yarraville (VFA)
- Height: 170 cm (5 ft 7 in)
- Weight: 79 kg (174 lb)

Playing career^{1}
Years	Club	Games (Goals)
1939–1946	Footscray	99 (178)
- ^{1} Playing statistics correct to the end of 1946.

Career highlights
- Con Curtain trophy: 1943; Footscray leading goalkicker: 1941

Allan Collins (4 November 1919 – 19 September 2006) was an Australian rules footballer who played with Footscray in the VFL during the 1940s.

Collins topped Footscray's goalkicking in 1943 with 40 goals and won that year's Best and Fairest award. He had previously been their leading goalkicker in 1941 when he managed 35 goals. He was the elder brother of the better-known Jack Collins.
