= List of Western Bulldogs leading goalkickers =

The following is a list of Western Bulldogs (formerly Footscray Football Club) leading goalkickers in each season of the Australian Football League (formerly the Victorian Football League) and AFL Women's.

== VFL/AFL ==
Season	Leading goalkicker	Goals
1925	Allan Hopkins	40
1926	Les Chapple	42
1926	Allan Hopkins (2)	42
1927	Les Chapple (2)	32
1928	Alby Morrison	50
1929	Alby Morrison (2)	50
1930	Alby Morrison (3)	48
1931	Alby Morrison (4)	36
1932	Les Dayman	37
1933	Alan Rait	59
1934	Alby Morrison (5)	46
1935	Jack Ryan	25
1936	Arthur Olliver	37
1937	Arthur Olliver (2)	39
1938	Charlie Luke	44
1939	Charlie Page	31
1940	Charlie Page (2)	52
1941	Allan Collins	35
1942	Norman Ware	51
1943	Allan Collins (2)	40
1944	Bill Wood	51
1945	Joe Ryan	37
1946	Bill Wood (2)	52
1947	Bill Wood (3)	75
1948	Bill Wood (4)	41
1949	Arthur Olliver (3)	28
1950	Bill Wood (5)	45
1951	Alby Linton	23
1951	Charlie Sutton	23
1952	Roger Duffy	20
1953	Jack Collins	50
1954	Jack Collins (2)	84
1955	Jack Collins (3)	60
1956	Max Cross	52
1957	Jack Collins (4)	74
1958	Jack Collins (5)	49
1959	Ray Baxter	42
1960	Ray Baxter (2)	37
1961	Ted Whitten	35
1962	Ted Whitten (2)	38
1963	George Bisset	16
1963	Merv Hobbs	16
1964	George Bisset (2)	46
1964	Ted Whitten (3)	46
1965	Merv Hobbs (2)	24
1966	Kevin Jackman	28
1967	George Bisset (3)	27
1968	Ted Whitten (4)	36
1969	George Bisset (4)	45
1970	George Bisset (5)	45
1971	Bernie Quinlan	48
1972	Laurie Sandilands	39
1973	Laurie Sandilands (2)	34
1974	Laurie Sandilands (3)	50
1975	Laurie Sandilands (4)	47
1976	Kelvin Templeton	82
1977	Kelvin Templeton (2)	40
1978	Kelvin Templeton (3)	118
1979	Kelvin Templeton (4)	91
1980	Kelvin Templeton (5)	75
1981	Jim Edmond	25
1981	Shane Loveless	25
1982	Simon Beasley	82
1983	Simon Beasley (2)	69
1984	Simon Beasley (3)	61
1985	Simon Beasley (4)	105
1986	Simon Beasley (5)	88
1987	Simon Beasley (6)	73
1988	Simon Beasley (7)	82
1989	Adrian Campbell	21
1990	Chris Grant	51
1991	Doug Hawkins	38
1992	Danny Del-Re	70
1993	Danny Del-Re (2)	36
1994	Chris Grant (2)	71
1995	Richard Osborne	53
1996	Jason Watts	44
1997	Simon Minton-Connell	43
1998	Paul Hudson	61
1999	Paul Hudson (2)	51
2000	Rohan Smith	42
2001	Brad Johnson	48
2002	Nathan Brown	57
2003	Nathan Brown (2)	56
2004	Luke Darcy	30
2004	Jade Rawlings	30
2005	Brad Johnson (2)	42
2006	Brad Johnson (3)	74
2007	Brad Johnson (4)	59
2008	Brad Johnson (5)	50
2009	Jason Akermanis	43
2010	Barry Hall	80
2011	Barry Hall (2)	55
2012	Daniel Giansiracusa	28
2013	Daniel Giansiracusa (2)	36
2014	Stewart Crameri	37
2015	Jake Stringer	56
2016	Jake Stringer (2)	42
2017	Liam Picken	24
2017	Jake Stringer (3)	24
2018	Billy Gowers	26
2019	Sam Lloyd	38
2020	Mitch Wallis	25
2021	Josh Bruce	48
2022	Aaron Naughton	51
2023	Aaron Naughton (2)	44
2024	Jamarra Ugle-Hagan	43
2025	Aaron Naughton (3)	60
2026	Aaron Naughton (4)	51

== AFL Women's ==
Season	Leading goalkicker	Goals
2017	Ellie Blackburn	6
2018	Brooke Lochland	12
2019	Katie Brennan	6
2020	Kirsten McLeod	5
2021	Isabel Huntington	12
2022 (S6)	Bonnie Toogood	10
2022 (S7)	Gabby Newton	8
2023	Kirsty Lamb	7
2024	Sarah Hartwig	8
2025	Emma McDonald	11
