= Alby Morrison =

Australian rules footballer, born 1909

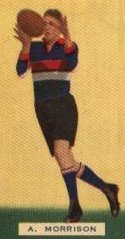

Personal information
- Full name: Albert George Henry Morrison
- Born: 29 January 1909; Footscray, Victoria
- Died: 24 September 1997 (aged 88)
- Original team: Kingsville
- Height: 183 cm (6 ft 0 in)
- Weight: 86 kg (190 lb)

Playing career^{1}
Years	Club	Games (Goals)
1928–38, 1941–42, 1946	Footscray	224 (369)
1939-40	Preston	39 (105)
1950-54	Sorrento	72 (141)
Total		335 (615)

Coaching career
Years	Club	Games (W–L–D)
1934–1935	Footscray	22 (6–16–0)
- ^{1} Playing statistics correct to the end of 1946.

Career highlights
- Footscray captain: 1934–1935, 1937; 2× McCarthy trophy: 1933, 1936; 5× Footscray leading goalkicker: 1928, 1929, 1930, 1931, 1934; 1953 SFC premiership player; 3x Sorrento leading goalkicker 1950(32),1953(64),1954(45)

Albert George Henry Morrison (29 January 1909 – 24 September 1997) was an Australian rules footballer who played for Footscray in the VFL during the 1930s and 1940s. He was named at half forward in Footscray's 'Team of the Century'

A versatile player, Morrison debuted in 1928 and when he played his last game in 1946 his career tally of 369 goals was the most ever by a Footscray player. The record lasted for over ten years until surpassed by Jack Collins. Morrison is also in the record books at Footscray as being their first player to kick 10 goals in a match. He achieved the feat in a game against Hawthorn in 1928 on the way to a debut season tally of 50 goals. It was the first of five times that he topped Footscray's goalkicking.

Morrison polled well in the Brownlow Medal during his career, finishing equal 4th in 1936 and equal 3rd in 1938. He was a Footscray Best and Fairest winner twice, in 1933 and 1936.

Morrison signed with Victorian Football Association club Preston in 1939, and served there as playing coach for two years before returning to Footscray in 1941.
