= David Thorpe (footballer) =

Australian rules footballer

Personal information
- Born: 30 May 1948 (age 78)
- Original team: North Footscray
- Height: 185 cm (6 ft 1 in)
- Weight: 83 kg (183 lb)

Playing career^{1}
Years	Club	Games (Goals)
1965–1973	Footscray	151 (79)
1974–1976	Richmond	27 (24)
Total		178 (103)
- ^{1} Playing statistics correct to the end of 1976.

Career highlights
- VFL premiership: 1974; Footscray captain: 1973; 2× Charles Sutton Medal: 1968, 1971; All-Australian team: 1972

David Thorpe (born 30 May 1948) is a former Australian rules footballer who played with Footscray and Richmond in the VFL.

A centreman, Thorpe played with Footscray from 1965 to 1973. He won the Charles Sutton Medal for the club's best and fairest player in 1968 and 1972. Thorpe missed out on the award in 1969 despite polling well in the Brownlow Medal, finishing the count in 6th position. From that season, until 1972, he represented Victoria at interstate football. For his performance in the 1972 Perth Carnival he earned All Australian selection.

Thorpe transferred to Richmond in 1974 and was a member of that season's premiership team, defeating North Melbourne in the grand final.
