= Charlie Sutton =

Australian rules footballer, born 1924

Personal information
- Full name: Charles Alfred George Sutton
- Born: 3 April 1924; Rushworth, Victoria
- Died: 5 June 2012 (aged 88); Footscray, Victoria
- Original team: Spotswood Citizens
- Height: 169 cm (5 ft 7 in)
- Weight: 87 kg (192 lb)

Playing career^{1}
Years	Club	Games (Goals)
1942–1956	Footscray	173 (65)

Representative team honours
Years	Team	Games (Goals)
	Victoria	18 (12)

Coaching career^{3}
Years	Club	Games (W–L–D)
1951–1957	Footscray	123 (72–50–2)
1967–1968	Footscray	38 (9–29–0)
Total		162 (81–79–2)
- ^{1} Playing statistics correct to the end of 1956.^{3} Coaching statistics correct as of 1968.

Career highlights
- Footscray premiership captain-coach 1954; Footscray Team of the Century; Con Curtain trophy 1950; Footscray leading goalicker 1951; Footscray captain 1951–1956

Charlie Sutton (3 April 1924 – 5 June 2012) was an Australian rules footballer who represented Footscray in the Victorian Football League (VFL). He captained the Bulldogs to their first VFL premiership in 1954.

Recruited from Spotswood, Sutton was a tough, nuggety footballer who embodied the club's fighting spirit. He played as a rover and half-forward, but it was as a back pocket player that he made his name. In 1950, he finished equal third in the Brownlow Medal count and won the Con Weickhardt Trophy (as it was then known) as the Bulldogs' best and fairest player that season.

He was captain-coach of the team from 1951 to 1955.

After his retirement as a player, Sutton coached Footscray from 1956 until 9 July 1957, when he was dismissed and replaced by Ted Whitten. Sutton later returned to coach Footscray in 1967 (replacing Ted Whitten) and 1968 (after which he resigned having decided that the ever-increasing demands of coaching clashed far too much with his business of running a hotel at Yarraville).

In 1978, Sutton took over the position of President of the Footscray Football Club when Dick Collinson resigned.

He has the Western Bulldogs best and fairest award, the Charles Sutton Medal, named in his honour.

In 1996, Sutton was inducted into the Australian Football Hall of Fame. Sutton died in 2012 at the age of 88.

== Bibliography ==
- Ross, J. (ed), 100 Years of Australian Football 1897–1996: The Complete Story of the AFL, All the Big Stories, All the Great Pictures, All the Champions, Every AFL Season Reported, Viking, (Ringwood), 1996. ISBN 0-670-86814-0
- Ross, J. (ed), The Australian Football Hall of Fame, HarperCollinsPublishers, (Pymble), 1999. ISBN 0-7322-6426-X
