= Harvey Stevens =

Australian rules footballer

Personal information
- Born: 8 August 1930
- Died: 15 December 2016 (aged 86)
- Original team: Reservoir (DVFL)
- Height: 188 cm (6 ft 2 in)
- Weight: 87 kg (192 lb)

Playing career^{1}
Years	Club	Games (Goals)
1948–1952	Collingwood	54 (56)
1953–1957	Footscray	72 (71)
Total		126 (127)
- ^{1} Playing statistics correct to the end of 1957.

Career highlights
- VFL premiership player: 1954; Charles Sutton Medal: 1953; Footscray captain: 1957

Harvey Stevens (8 August 1930 – 15 December 2016) was an Australian rules footballer who played with Footscray and Collingwood in the Victorian Football League (VFL).

Stevens started his career in 1948 at Collingwood and played in their 1952 Grand Final before being released by the club during the summer.

In 1953, Stevens joined Footscray, the club his father Arthur had played for. He won the Footscray best and fairest award that year.

Stevens is a member of Footscray's first premiership winning side, playing as a ruckman in the 1954 VFL Grand Final.

His grandsons are Daniel Talia who played for the Adelaide Football Club, and Michael Talia who played for the Western Bulldogs and the Sydney Swans.

Stevens died on 14 December 2016, aged 86.
