= Ryan Griffen =

Australian rules footballer

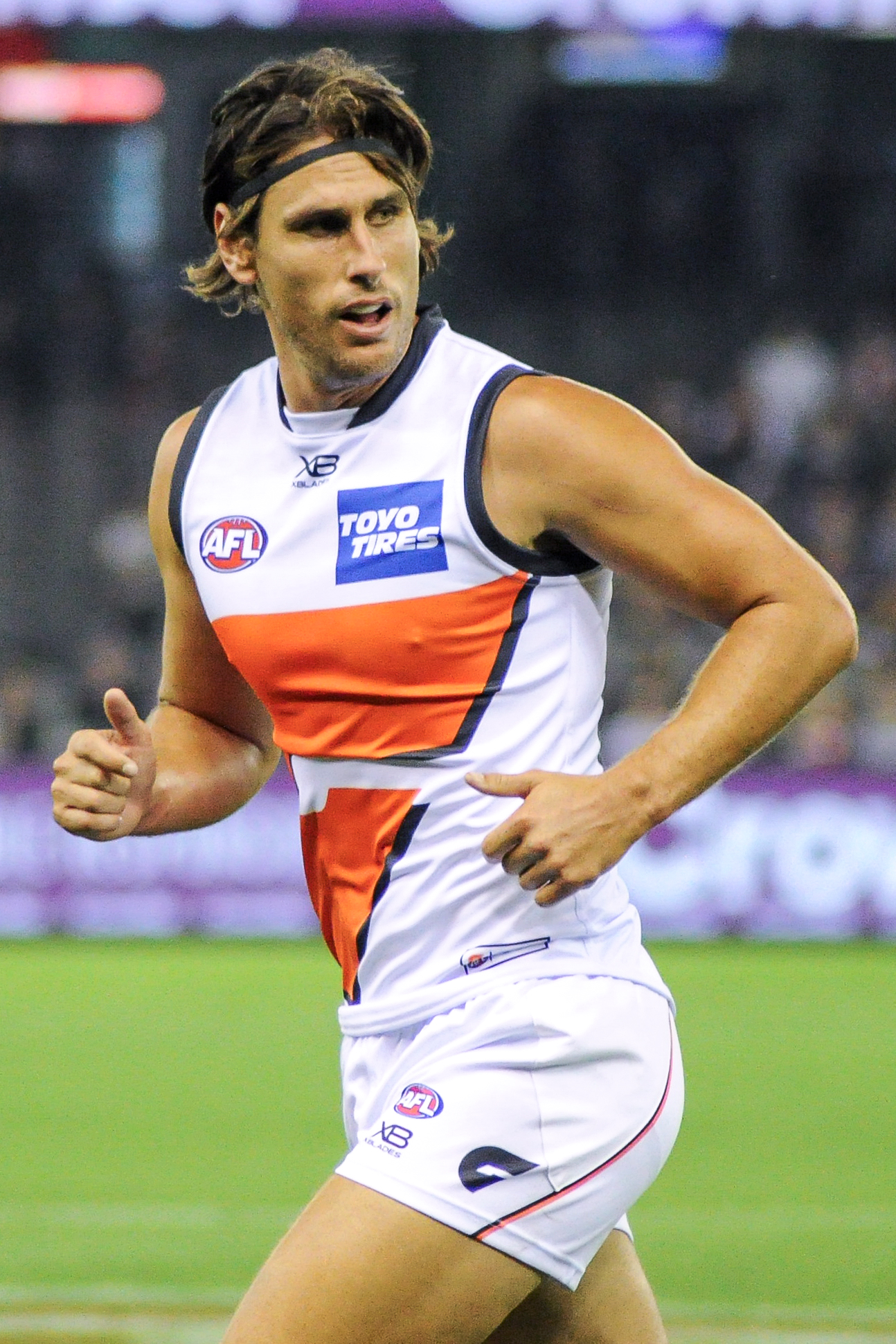
- Griffen playing for Greater Western Sydney in June 2017

Personal information
- Full name: Ryan Leigh Griffen
- Nickname: Gaz
- Born: 27 July 1986 (age 40); Goolwa, South Australia
- Original team: South Adelaide (SANFL)
- Draft: No. 3 (PP), 2004 national draft
- Height: 192 cm (6 ft 4 in)
- Weight: 88 kg (194 lb)
- Position: Midfielder

Playing career^{1}
Years	Club	Games (Goals)
2005–2014	Western Bulldogs	202 (130)
2015–2018	Greater Western Sydney	55 (32)
Total		257 (162)

Representative team honours
Years	Team	Games (Goals)
2008	Dream Team	1 (0)
- ^{1} Playing statistics correct to the end of 2018.

Career highlights
- All-Australian team: 2013; 2× Charles Sutton Medal: 2010, 2013; Western Bulldogs captain: 2014; Bob Rose–Charlie Sutton Medal : 2014; AFL Rising Star nominee: 2005

Ryan Leigh Griffen (born 27 July 1986) is a former Australian rules footballer who played for the Western Bulldogs and the Greater Western Sydney Giants in the Australian Football League (AFL).

Griffen was born in Goolwa, a South Australian port town near the mouth of the Murray River and began his football career with South Adelaide. The Western Bulldogs chose Griffen in the 2004 AFL national draft at number 3 as a priority pick. He managed 17 games in his debut season and came second in the AFL Rising Star Medal count.

== AFL career ==
=== Western Bulldogs (2005–2014) ===
Touted among the best players on offer in the 2004 AFL draft, the Western Bulldogs selected Griffen third overall as a priority pick. He had represented South Australia in the 2004 AFL Under 18 Championships and played senior football for SANFL club South Adelaide in his draft year.

Griffen made his debut in Round 4 of the 2005 AFL season against the West Coast Eagles at Subiaco, where the Bulldogs were defeated by the Eagles by 36 points. He played 17 games in his first season as a Bulldog.

The 2006 Record describes Griffen as a "defender, both in a man-marking role and as a launching pad for attacking moves". Griffen already displayed a good deal of the latter at the midway point of the 2006 season and most football critics anticipated that he would have a long career.

He suffered a jarring knee injury in Round 11 of the 2007 season, where he dislocated his kneecap in the win over the Brisbane Lions. The extent of the injury, in itself, was not season threatening although he did suffer complications from a twisted bowel, which hampered his recovery and ruled him out for the rest of the season.

In 2008, Griffen played 24 games spending more time in the midfield, averaging career highs in disposals, contested and uncontested possessions, inside 50s and clearances. He covered plenty of territory and ranked number one at the Bulldogs in inside 50s and rebound 50s combined. He also ranked third in the AFL for running bounces and equal fourth at the Bulldogs for score assists during the H&A rounds. The speedy midfielder broke open a number of games in 2008, earning maximum Brownlow votes in consecutive matches against St Kilda and Essendon in rounds three and four. Finished second in the AFL for bounces and top 10 in the Bulldogs' best and fairest. In 2009, Griffen played well at times, winning three Brownlow Medal votes on multiple occasions, but many believed he hadn't reached his full potential.

Griffen was one of the players who spoke out regarding Jason Akermanis' controversial sacking midway through 2010 season. In the Round 14 match against Hawthorn, Griffen failed to make an effort to take a mark against Xavier Ellis 30 metres out late in the final quarter as the Hawks came from behind to win by 3 points, and he was widely criticised. Griffen made up for his mistake the following week when he was named among the Bulldogs' best in a 68-point thrashing of Carlton. On the eve of the finals, Griffen was shifted from his customary position on the wing into the midfield to replace injured teammate Adam Cooney. Although the Bulldogs were again bundled out in the Preliminary Final, Griffen was one of the stand-outs, averaging 28 possessions across the three games. At the end of the season, he was proclaimed the winner of the 2010 Charlie Sutton Medal.

In 2011, Griffen maintained his excellent form from 2010 and was a frontrunner to win another Charlie Sutton Medal along with Matthew Boyd. After another stellar season in 2012, Griffen amassed a club-record 47 possessions – 22 of which were contested in the round 21 match against the Sydney Swans. The record eclipsed the previous best of 46 set by Simon Atkins. Griffen picked up 16 touches in the first quarter. His previous best was 37 possessions.

Griffen produced possibly his best season in 2013, recording 30 or more possessions 11 times and taking out his second Charles Sutton Medal ahead of a fast-finishing Tom Liberatore. Griffen also finished 6th in the AFLPA MVP Award with 177 votes. While averaging 29 disposals per game, he also achieved All-Australian honours. Griffen was also ranked #8 best player in the AFL in Mike Sheahan's Top 50 Players and the Official AFL Player Ratings. On 3 December 2013, Griffen was awarded the captaincy of the Bulldogs, taking over from Boyd, the skipper of three years.

Griffen played 19 games in his final season at the Bulldogs in 2014 before he left the club to join Greater Western Sydney, thus handing over the captaincy to veteran Bob Murphy.

=== Greater Western Sydney (2015–2018) ===
At the end of the 2014 season, Griffen asked to join the Greater Western Sydney Giants. On 15 October, a trade was successfully reached, reuniting Griffen with coach Leon Cameron, and players Dylan Addison and Callan Ward.

In round 3 of the 2017 season, Griffen suffered a syndesmosis of the left ankle, which left him unable to play for the rest of the home and away season. He made his return in a scratch match between the Giants' reserves and Adelaide's reserves the day after their qualifying final.

Griffen announced his retirement from AFL football, following the Giants' semi-final loss to Collingwood on 15 September 2018.

== Post AFL ==
In November 2018, it was announced that Griffen would be returning to his home club Goolwa-Port Elliot Magpies who compete in the Great Southern Football League.

== Statistics ==
Legend
G	Goals	K	Kicks	D	Disposals	T	Tackles
B	Behinds	H	Handballs	M	Marks

Season	Team	No.	Games	Totals							Averages (per game)						
Season	Team	No.	Games	G	B	K	H	D	M	T	G	B	K	H	D	M	T
2005	Western Bulldogs	16	17	7	7	126	97	223	55	39	0.4	0.4	7.4	5.7	13.1	3.2	2.3
2006	Western Bulldogs	16	24	7	9	209	202	411	87	69	0.3	0.4	8.7	8.4	17.1	3.6	2.9
2007	Western Bulldogs	16	10	2	4	78	65	143	31	29	0.2	0.4	7.8	6.5	14.3	3.1	2.9
2008	Western Bulldogs	16	24	18	9	295	183	478	103	63	0.8	0.4	12.3	7.6	19.9	4.3	2.6
2009	Western Bulldogs	16	22	17	9	270	213	483	70	80	0.8	0.4	12.3	9.7	22.0	3.2	3.6
2010	Western Bulldogs	16	24	23	12	358	216	574	80	78	1.0	0.5	14.9	9.0	23.9	3.3	3.2
2011	Western Bulldogs	16	22	24	17	341	187	528	75	102	1.1	0.8	15.5	8.5	24.0	3.4	4.6
2012	Western Bulldogs	16	20	8	11	287	252	539	66	86	0.4	0.6	14.4	12.6	27.0	3.3	4.3
2013	Western Bulldogs	16	20	14	10	304	275	579	63	98	0.7	0.5	15.2	13.8	29.0	3.2	4.9
2014	Western Bulldogs	16	19	10	10	219	217	436	35	99	0.5	0.5	11.5	11.4	23.0	1.8	5.2
2015	Greater Western Sydney	32	21	7	3	198	235	433	85	80	0.3	0.1	9.4	11.2	20.6	4.0	3.8
2016	Greater Western Sydney	32	15	9	13	137	179	316	41	79	0.6	0.9	9.1	11.9	21.1	2.7	5.3
2017	Greater Western Sydney	32	3	0	2	20	26	46	5	9	0.0	0.7	6.7	8.7	15.3	1.7	3.0
2018	Greater Western Sydney	32	16	16	11	136	104	240	47	35	1.0	0.7	8.5	6.5	15.0	2.9	2.2
Career			257	162	127	2978	2451	5429	843	946	0.6	0.5	11.6	9.5	21.1	3.3	3.7
