= Luke Beveridge =

Australian rules footballer and coach

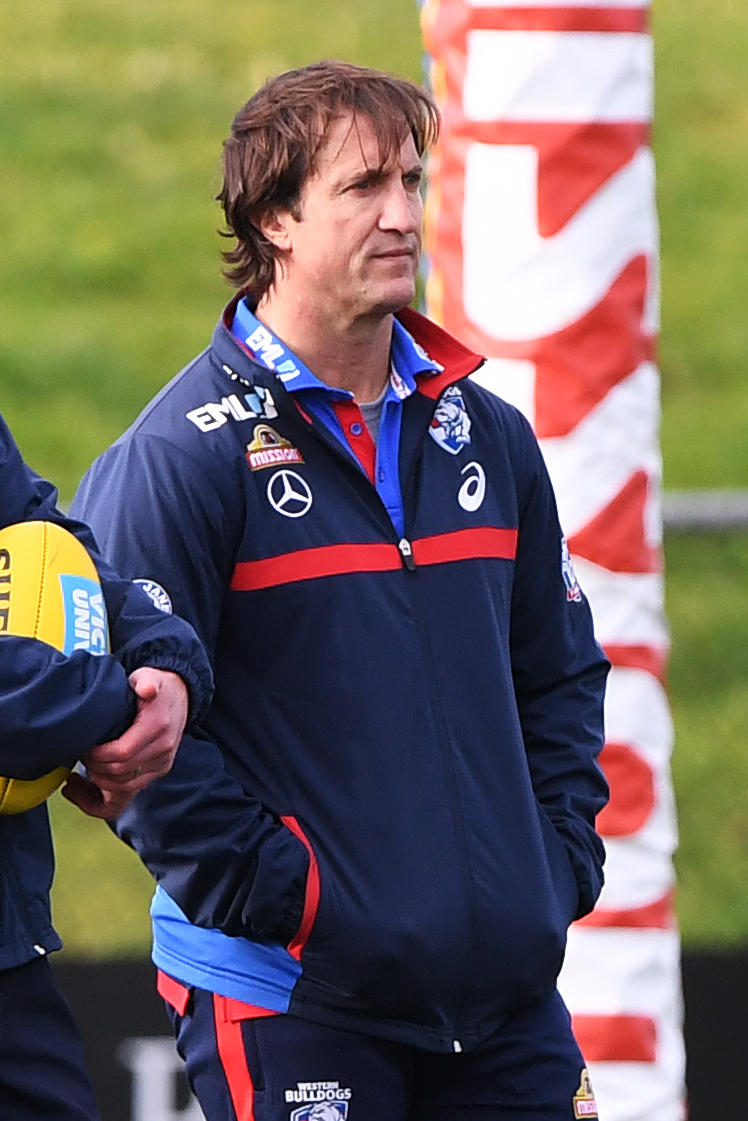
- Beveridge in August 2018

Personal information
- Nickname: Bevo
- Born: 23 August 1970 (age 56)
- Original team: St Peters
- Height: 173 cm (5 ft 8 in)
- Weight: 81 kg (179 lb)
- Positions: Rover, forward

Playing career^{1}
Years	Club	Games (Goals)
1989–1992	Melbourne	42 (41)
1993–1995	Footscray	31 (29)
1996–1999	St Kilda	45 (37)
Total		118 (107)

Coaching career^{3}
Years	Club	Games (W–L–D)
2015–	Western Bulldogs	278 (158–119–1)
- ^{1} Playing statistics correct to the end of 1999.^{3} Coaching statistics correct as of the 2026 season.

Career highlights
- As player: Harold Ball Memorial Trophy (1989); AFL Greek Team of the Century (2004); As coach: AFL premiership coach (2016); All-Australian (2016); 2× AFL CA Coach of the year (2015, 2016); Most Games Coached of the Western Bulldogs

Luke Beveridge (born 23 August 1970) is an Australian rules football coach and former player who played for Melbourne, Footscray and St Kilda in the Australian Football League (AFL) during the 1990s. He has been senior coach of the Western Bulldogs since 2015.

== Playing career ==
Small in stature, he mainly played as a rover and a forward. He is the grandson of Collingwood premiership player Jack Beveridge.

=== Melbourne ===
Beveridge played for Melbourne Football Club from 1989 until 1992, playing a total of 42 games and kicked a total of 41 goals. Beveridge won the Melbourne first year player award in 1989 and played his most games with the club in 1991.

=== Footscray ===
He was traded to Footscray for pick 122 in the 1992 AFL draft. He was seen as a depth player for the club's playing list. He managed 31 games in three seasons from 1993 until 1995 for Footscray Football Club.

=== St Kilda ===
At the end of 1995, Beveridge was traded to St Kilda for pick 52 in the 1995 AFL draft. His father was a recruitment officer for the club. Beveridge played 45 games for the Saints in four seasons from 1996 until 1999. Beveridge played in St Kilda's 1996 pre-season cup winning side. He played in 7 of 22 matches in the 1997 home and away rounds. St Kilda qualified in first position for the 1997 finals series. He retired at the end of the 1999 season.

=== AFL Greek Team of the Century ===
In 2002, Beveridge was elected in the AFL Greek Team of the Century for players having full or partial Greek heritage. His maternal grandfather originates from the island of Samos.

== Coaching career ==
He began his coaching career in the Victorian Amateur Football Association competition where he coached St Bedes/Mentone Tigers to the C, B and A Grade premierships in consecutive seasons. 2008 marks the club’s last premiership.

=== Collingwood Football Club assistant coach (2009–2010) ===
Beveridge had two years in an assistant coaching position as head of player development manager under senior coach Mick Malthouse at Collingwood from 2009 to 2010, where he had an input to the club's 2010 premiership.

=== Hawthorn Football Club assistant coach (2012–2014) ===
After having a year off, Beveridge joined Hawthorn in 2012 as an assistant coach under senior coach Alastair Clarkson specialising in working with the club's defence.

=== Western Bulldogs senior coach (2015–present) ===
Beveridge left Hawthorn after the 2014 season and was originally going to become director of coaching at St Kilda. On 14 November 2014, however, it was instead announced that he would become the senior coach of the Western Bulldogs, succeeding Brendan McCartney.

Despite being tipped by many for the wooden spoon following the loss of several key decision makers including previous coach Brendan McCartney, captain Ryan Griffen, CEO Simon Garlick, former Brownlow Medallist Adam Cooney and over 700 games of experience at the end of 2014, as well as losing reigning best and fairest Tom Liberatore to a knee injury during the pre-season that would ultimately sideline him for the entire 2015 season, Beveridge led an impressive resurgence by the Western Bulldogs, which finished in sixth place on the ladder at the end of the 2015 season, and hence qualified for their first finals series since 2010, before losing to the Adelaide Crows in an elimination final at the Melbourne Cricket Ground. For his efforts, Beveridge was named the AFL Coaches Association coach of the year.

In the 2016 season, Beveridge coached the Western Bulldogs to a premiership in the 2016 AFL Grand Final, when Western Bulldogs defeated the Sydney Swans by a score of 13.11 (89) to 10.7 (67), by margin of 22 points. This was the club's second premiership since 1954 despite them suffering long-term injuries throughout the season, notably captain Bob Murphy. The Bulldogs had finished 7th in the minor premiership. They played in three consecutive elimination finals, two of them interstate. On the path to the grand final, they beat the West Coast Eagles at Domain Stadium, Hawthorn at the MCG and Greater Western Sydney in a memorable preliminary final at Spotless Stadium. In an emotional display which, according to The Age, "will undoubtedly go down as one of the great moments in Australian sporting history", Beveridge handed his coach's premiership medal to Murphy, saying, "This is yours, mate. You deserve it more than anyone." Murphy, though thankful, returned the medal the following day. It has since been placed in the Western Bulldogs museum. Later that month, Beveridge won the Spirit of Sport award at the Sport Australia Hall of Fame Awards for his gesture to Murphy. He was also named the AFL Coaches Association coach of the year for the second year running.

In the 2017 season, Western Bulldogs under Beveridge slipped out of the eighth to finish tenth on the ladder and did not make the finals. In the 2018 season, The club under Beveridge missed out on the finals again, when they finished thirteenth on the ladder. In the 2019 season, the club under Beveridge returned to the finals after they finished seventh on the ladder, but were eliminated in the elimination final to Greater Western Sydney Giants. In the 2020 season, the club under Beveridge returned to the finals again after they finished seventh for the second consecutive year in a row, but were eliminated by St Kilda in the elimination final.

In the 2021 season, Beveridge coached the Western Bulldogs to the 2021 AFL Grand Final, but fell short and lost to Melbourne by a margin of 74 points with the final score Melbourne 21.14 (140) to Western Bulldogs 10.6 (66).

In the 2022 season, the club under Beveridge returned to the finals again after they finished eighth, but were eliminated by Fremantle in the elimination final. In the 2023 season, the club under Beveridge just missed out of the finals, when they finished ninth. In Round 23 of the 2024 season Luke Beveridge Coached his 228th game as head coach of the Western Bulldogs equaling Bulldogs legend Ted Whitten as most games coached for the Bulldogs.

== Statistics ==
=== Playing statistics ===
Legend
G	Goals	K	Kicks	D	Disposals	T	Tackles
B	Behinds	H	Handballs	M	Marks

Season	Team	No.	Games	Totals							Averages (per game)						
Season	Team	No.	Games	G	B	K	H	D	M	T	G	B	K	H	D	M	T
1989	Melbourne	48	12	7	4	77	47	124	16	9	0.6	0.3	6.4	3.9	10.3	1.3	0.8
1990	Melbourne	24	3	1	0	14	4	18	4	1	0.3	0.0	4.7	1.3	6.0	1.3	0.3
1991	Melbourne	24	21	27	8	250	90	340	40	23	1.3	0.4	11.9	4.3	16.2	1.9	1.1
1992	Melbourne	24	6	6	2	73	33	106	18	7	1.0	0.3	12.2	5.5	17.7	3.0	1.2
1993	Footscray	19	8	8	5	95	40	135	18	19	1.0	0.6	11.9	5.0	16.9	2.3	2.4
1994	Footscray	19	12	14	13	117	34	151	29	23	1.2	1.1	9.8	2.8	12.6	2.4	1.9
1995	Footscray	19	11	7	7	69	33	102	16	13	0.6	0.6	6.3	3.0	9.3	1.5	1.2
1996	St Kilda	27	16	16	9	153	78	231	46	31	1.0	0.6	9.6	4.9	14.4	2.9	1.9
1997	St Kilda	27	7	4	3	25	9	34	7	5	0.6	0.4	3.6	1.3	4.9	1.0	0.7
1998	St Kilda	27	18	13	5	111	62	173	42	23	0.7	0.3	6.2	3.4	9.6	2.3	1.3
1999	St Kilda	27	4	4	0	41	35	76	16	4	1.0	0.0	10.3	8.8	19.0	4.0	1.0
Career			118	107	56	1025	465	1490	252	158	0.9	0.5	8.7	3.9	12.6	2.1	1.3

=== Coaching statistics ===
Statistics are correct to end of the 2026 season.

Team	Year	Home and Away Season					Finals			
Team	Year	Won	Lost	Drew	Win %	Finish	Won	Lost	Win %	Result
WBD	2015	14	8	0	.636	6th out of 18	0	1	.000	Lost to Adelaide in Elimination Final
WBD	2016	15	7	0	.682	7th out of 18	4	0	1.000	Defeated Sydney in Grand Final
WBD	2017	11	11	0	.500	10th out of 18	-	-	-	-
WBD	2018	8	14	0	.364	13th out of 18	-	-	-	-
WBD	2019	12	10	0	.545	7th out of 18	0	1	.000	Lost to GWS in Elimination Final
WBD	2020	10	7	0	.588	7th out of 18	0	1	.000	Lost to St Kilda in Elimination Final
WBD	2021	15	7	0	.682	5th out of 18	3	1	.750	Lost to Melbourne in Grand Final
WBD	2022	12	10	0	.545	8th out of 18	0	1	.000	Lost to Fremantle in Elimination Final
WBD	2023	12	11	0	.522	9th out of 18	-	-	-	-
WBD	2024	14	9	0	.608	6th out of 18	0	1	.000	Lost to Hawthorn in Elimination Final
WBD	2025	14	9	0	.608	9th out of 18	-	-	-	-
WBD	2026	13	9	1	.587	8th out of 18	1	1	.500	Lost to Adelaide in Elimination Final
Total		150	112	1	.572		8	7	.533	Premierships: 2016

== Honours and achievements ==
=== Playing honours ===
- Team
- Ansett Cup (St Kilda) 1996
- McClelland Trophy (St Kilda) 1997
- Individual
  - Harold Ball Memorial Trophy: 1989

=== Coaching honours ===
- Team
  - AFL premiership coach: 2016
- Individual
  - Jock McHale Medal: 2016
  - All-Australian: 2016
  - 2× AFL CA Coach of the year: 2015, 2016
  - Spirit of Sport Award: 2016
  - Most Games Coached for the Western Bulldogs
