= Dave Ryan (Australian footballer) =

Australian rules footballer

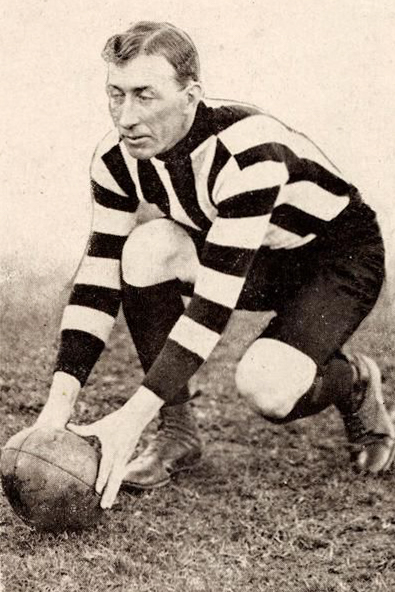
- Ryan in 1910

Personal information
- Full name: David James Ryan
- Born: 23 January 1885; Dookie, Victoria
- Died: 13 February 1957 (aged 72); Sydney, New South Wales
- Original team: Yarrawonga
- Height: 178 cm (5 ft 10 in)
- Weight: 86 kg (190 lb)

Playing career^{1}
Years	Club	Games (Goals)
1906	Geelong	2 (0)
1907–1912	Collingwood	99 (72)
Total		101 (72)
- ^{1} Playing statistics correct to the end of 1912.

David James Ryan (23 January 1885 – 13 February 1957) was an Australian rules footballer who played for Geelong and Collingwood in the Victorian Football League (VFL).

Originally from Yarrawonga, Ryan arrived at Collingwood in 1907 after failing to make an impact in his season with Geelong. He participated in the finals at his new club in each of his first five seasons and was a ruckman in the 1910 premiership team. He also played in Collingwood's losing Grand Final the following season, again as a follower. Used at times up forward, he retired at the end of the 1912 season but continued playing briefly in the VFA at Prahran.

He was the brother of another Collingwood player Michael Ryan and the uncle of Joe Ryan, who played for and coached Footscray. Outside of football, he was a policeman for about 20 years until he moved to Sydney around 1930, where he worked as a store detective. He died in Sydney in February 1957.
