= Peter Welsh (footballer, born 1951) =

Australian rules footballer

Personal information
- Born: 29 June 1951 (age 75)
- Original team: Footscray-Yarraville Socials
- Height: 192 cm (6 ft 4 in)
- Weight: 96 kg (212 lb)

Playing career^{1}
Years	Club	Games (Goals)
1968–1978	Footscray	165 (92)
- ^{1} Playing statistics correct to the end of 1978.

Career highlights
- Charles Sutton Medal: 1972

Peter Welsh (born 29 June 1951) is a former Australian rules footballer who played with Footscray in the VFL.

Welsh usually played as a ruckman or in a key position. He won Footscray's Best and Fairest award in 1972 and kicked a career high 44 goals in 1974. He also represented Victoria at interstate football.
