= Ivan McAlpine =

Australian rules footballer, born 1907

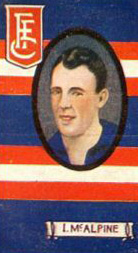

Personal information
- Full name: Ivan George McAlpine
- Born: 19 July 1907; Longwarry, Victoria
- Died: 16 April 1992 (aged 84); Croydon, Victoria
- Original team: Longwarry
- Height: 182 cm (6 ft 0 in)
- Weight: 70 kg (154 lb)

Playing career^{1}
| Years | Club | Games (Goals) |
| 1927–1933 | Footscray | 112 (24) |
| 1934–1937 | Hawthorn | 67 (27) |
| Total | | 179 (51) |

Coaching career
| Years | Club | Games (W–L–D) |
| 1935–1938 | Hawthorn | 72 (22–50–0) |
- ^{1} Playing statistics correct to the end of 1937.

Career highlights
- 3× McCarthy trophy: 1927, 1930, 1932

Ivan George McAlpine (19 July 1907 – 16 April 1992) was an Australian rules footballer who played for Footscray and Hawthorn in the Victorian Football League (VFL).

McAlpine was wingman and regularly represented Victoria in interstate football. He won the inaugural Footscray Best and Fairest award in 1927 and won the award again in 1930 and 1932. For consecutive seasons in 1931 and 1932 he finished in the top 5 of the Brownlow Medal count.

Having captained Footscray in 1933, his job at Menzies Creek made it difficult for him to attend training so he crossed over to Hawthorn which was closer. He had accepted the role of captain-coach. Despite retiring as a player in 1937 he stayed at the club for the following season as coach.

After the war, McAlpine taught and captain-coached the local St James side near Benalla. In 1947 he transferred from Benalla to Alfredton.

While coaching in Ballarat he led Sebastopol to the premiership in the Ballarat B grade competition in 1949.
