= Joe Ryan (footballer) =

Australian rules footballer, born 1917

Personal information
- Full name: Michael Joseph Ryan
- Born: 27 September 1917; Footscray, Victoria
- Died: 19 October 1986 (aged 69); Avondale Heights, Victoria
- Original team: Footscray Rovers
- Height: 170 cm (5 ft 7 in)
- Weight: 76 kg (168 lb)

Playing career^{1}
Years	Club	Games (Goals)
1937–1948	Footscray	167 (261)

Coaching career
Years	Club	Games (W–L–D)
1959–1960	Footscray	2 (0–2–0)
- ^{1} Playing statistics correct to the end of 1948.

Career highlights
- 2× Con Curtain trophy: 1946, 1947; Footscray leading goalkicker: 1945

Michael Joseph Ryan (27 September 1917 – 19 October 1986) was an Australian rules footballer who represented Footscray in the Victorian Football League (VFL) during the 1930s and 1940s. Ryan topped Footscray's goalkicking in 1945 with 37 goals and won the club's best and fairest the following two seasons.

He was the brother of former Footscray team-mate Bill, son of Collingwood footballer Michael, and the nephew of Collingwood premiership player David.
