= Arthur Olliver =

Australian rules footballer and coach

Personal information
- Full name: Arthur Olliver
- Born: 10 December 1916; Footscray, Victoria
- Died: 31 May 1988 (aged 71); West Footscray, Victoria
- Original team: Footscray Tech Old Boys
- Height: 189 cm (6 ft 2 in)
- Weight: 87 kg (192 lb)
- Position: Ruckman

Playing career^{1}
Years	Club	Games (Goals)
1935–1950	Footscray	272 (354)

Coaching career
Years	Club	Games (W–L–D)
1943–1950	Footscray	128 (68–59–1)
1960–1963	West Perth	88 (48–37–3)
- ^{1} Playing statistics correct to the end of 1963.

Career highlights
- Con Curtain trophy: 1941, 1944; Footscray leading goalkicker: 1937, 1937, 1949; Footscray captain-coach: 1943–1946, 1948–1950; Footscray Team of the Century; Victorian representative (2 games, 0 goals); West Perth premiership coach: 1960

Arthur Olliver (10 December 1916 – 31 May 1988) was an Australian rules footballer in the (then) Victorian Football League (VFL), and coached successfully in the then Western Australian National Football League (WANFL).

A champion Footscray ruckman over 16 years with the club, Olliver held the games record for the Bulldogs prior to Ted Whitten. In seven seasons as captain-coach Olliver got the Bulldogs into the finals three times, and saw them narrowly miss out twice.

One of Footscray's longest serving players, Olliver played 272 VFL games and kicked 354 goals for the club. Olliver was appointed captain-coach of New Norfolk in Tasmania, where he stayed for three years. In 1951 he won his club's best and fairest award, and captain-coached the Tasmanian state team. Olliver's last involvement in top-level football was as non-playing coach of West Perth Football Club in the WANFL between 1960 and 1963. In his first season, the Cardinals won their first WANFL premiership for nine seasons, but they were not able to keep up this form, finishing fifth, third and fifth in an eight-club competition for his final three seasons.

In 2003 Olliver was inducted into the Australian Football Hall of Fame. He has also been inducted into the Footscray/Western Bulldogs Hall of Fame and was named on the interchange in their Team of the Century.
