= Easton Wood =

Australian rules footballer (born 1989)

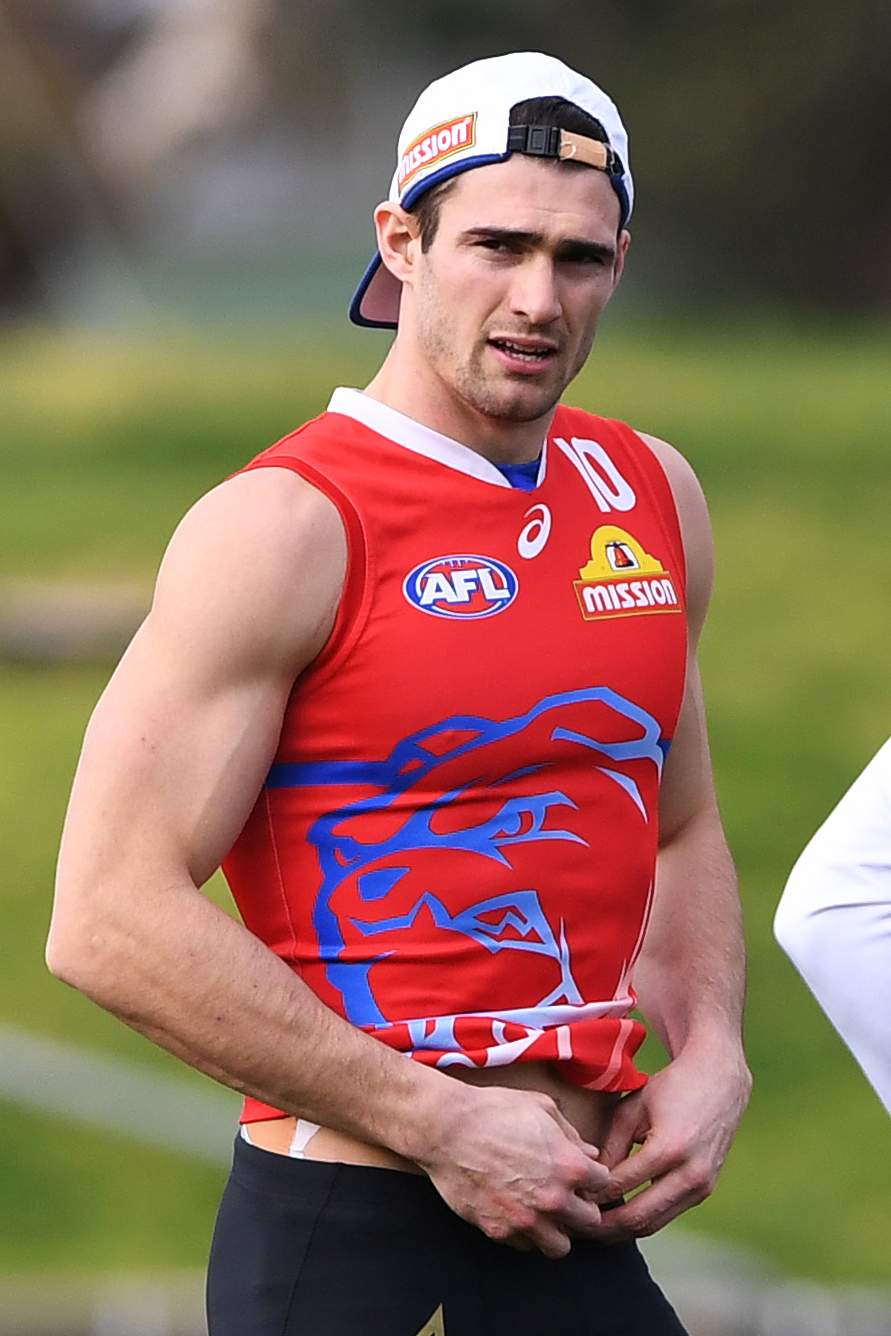
- Wood at Western Bulldogs training in 2018

Personal information
- Full name: Easton Phillip Wood
- Born: 4 September 1989 (age 37); Camperdown, Victoria
- Original team: Camperdown/Geelong Grammar
- Draft: No. 43, 2007 National Draft
- Height: 187 cm (6 ft 2 in)
- Weight: 87 kg (192 lb)
- Position: Defender / midfielder

Playing career^{1}
Years	Club	Games (Goals)
2008–2021	Western Bulldogs	188 (20)

International team honours^{2}
Years	Team	Games (Goals)
2011	Australia	1 (0)
- ^{1} Playing statistics correct to the end of the 2021 season.^{2} Representative statistics correct as of 2011.

Career highlights
- AFL premiership captain (2016); Western Bulldogs captain: 2018–2019; Charles Sutton Medal (2015); All-Australian team (2015); Pre-season premiership player: 2010

Easton Phillip Wood (born 4 September 1989) is a former Australian rules footballer who played for the Western Bulldogs in the Australian Football League (AFL). He grew up in Camperdown, Victoria while attending Geelong Grammar School. He was drafted with the 43rd selection in the 2007 AFL draft. He made his AFL debut in the 2009 AFL season, playing 2 games. Since then, Wood has been an AFL Premiership player and a AFL premiership captain, an All-Australian, a two-time Australian International Rules Series representative, and a Charles Sutton Medallist. He served as the team's captain for the majority of the 2016 season, as well as between the 2018-2019 seasons, and served as the team's vice captain in 2017.

== Family and early life ==
Wood was born at "Gnotuk", a property near Camperdown in the Western District of Victoria. His parents, Phil Wood and Fiona (née McLeod) were both athletes. Wood came from Camperdown, Victoria, and played for the Camperdown Football Club in the Hampden Football Netball League junior divisions, winning the Under 16s best and fairest in 2005. Wood attended Geelong Grammar School on a dual academic and sports scholarship, after being recognised for his talents in cricket. Wood came to the attention of Bulldogs recruitment manager Scott Clayton after his performances in school football as a medium-sized running midfielder with a strong leap. Wood nominated for the 2007 AFL National Draft, and was selected by the Bulldogs with their fourth selection (#43 overall).

Easton's older brother McLeod is an officer in the Australian Army. Easton also has a younger brother, Angus, and three younger sisters, Rhiannon, Juliet and Olivia. Wood has one daughter, Matilda, and one son, Frederick.

== AFL career ==
=== 2008–2013: Early career & Injury struggles ===
After being drafted by the Bulldogs in 2007, Wood required a shoulder reconstruction, and soon after a screening for lymphatic cancer, meaning he spent the 2008 season on the sidelines. During this time, Wood wore the number '29' guernsey. Wood made his debut in the Western Bulldogs 5-point loss to the West Coast Eagles in the 19th round of the 2009 AFL season at the Etihad Stadium. He had 14 disposals, kicked 2 behinds, laid 3 tackles and took 2 marks. He went on to play the next week against Brisbane Lions, collecting 6 disposals and a mark, but was not selected for finals matches.

Wood consolidated his position in the team in 2010, being selected for 11 games. Wood played in the Western Bulldogs' pre-season premiership win over future grand finalists St Kilda, by a solid 40 points. After being named as an emergency on 7 occasions he broke into the team in round 12, collecting 16 disposals, 4 marks, and 5 tackles, proving his worth in the side. After playing 9 consecutive games, Wood suffered a hamstring injury and did not return to the side until the Bulldogs 5-point semi final victory over Sydney. He played in the Western Bulldogs 24-point loss in the preliminary final against St Kilda, where he had 13 disposals, 3 marks and 2 tackles. At the seasons end, Wood was awarded the 'Most Promising Player' award.

Wood played 15 games in a breakout 2011 season. In Round 1 of the 2011 AFL season, Wood suffered a serious ankle injury. He went under surgery the same night as the injury due to the seriousness of the injury. He missed the next 7 rounds, but he made his return to the team in Round 9 and then missed only two more games for the season. Wood had a career best game in the Western Bulldogs' 27-point win over Carlton, picking up 17 disposals, 7 marks and 6 tackles. Wood represented Australia in the 2011 International Rules Series played against Ireland. Training for the event occurred at Whitten Oval, which was the current training ground for the Bulldogs. Wood re-signed with the Western Bulldogs at the seasons end.

Wood had another injury-plagued season in 2012, playing 14 games. 2012 was Wood's first season playing with the number 10 guernsey. In Round 6 Wood injured his hamstring and was benched for three weeks, after having a great game that round where he collected 19 possessions at 79% disposal efficiency, while also collecting five marks and one goal. Wood broke his career high disposal record in round 12 and round 23, collecting 20 disposals in each match. Wood only played in three victories for the Western Bulldogs for the entire season after his injury combined with a bad season for the Bulldogs, where they finished 15th on the ladder.

Wood struggled in 2013, playing just five games. Wood injured his hamstring in the early stages of the Bulldogs' 67-point loss to Richmond in the 3rd round of the 2013 AFL season. He stayed in the VFL for a few weeks after his recovery, in one game gathering 26 disposals and grabbing 8 marks. Wood had a relatively mediocre season after his inclusion in the team in Round 20, playing out the remainder of the season without issue.

=== 2014–2019: Improvement & leadership ===
The 2014 AFL season was a big improvement for Wood, playing 18 games and getting 20 disposals or above per game 3 times. Wood played his 50th game in the Bulldogs nail biting 2-point victory over Richmond in the 3rd round of the season. In that game, Wood collected 11 disposals, 5 marks and 3 tackles. Wood collected a career-high 22 disposals in the Western Bulldogs' 27-point win over Greater Western Sydney in Round 4, also picking up 4 marks, 2 tackles, 5 inside 50s and a clearance. By the end of the season, Wood had played 65 games in his 7 years at the Bulldogs. Wood signed on with the Bulldogs for 1 more year in September.

The 2015 AFL season saw Wood have the best year of his career yet, winning many accolades for his strong performance. Wood only missed 1 game for that entire season, missing out on the Bulldogs 70-point loss to Hawthorn in round 3. Wood cemented his reputation as an excellent mark throughout the season, getting 10 or more tackles 4 times and having a career high 13 marks in one game against St Kilda in round 13. Wood had 19 disposals, 7 rebounds and 9 marks in the Bulldogs 7-point elimination final loss to Adelaide, in his last game of the season. Wood won the Charles Sutton Medal as the club's best and fairest, with a total of 268 votes. Wood beat second placed Bob Murphy by 39 votes. Wood was also honoured with All-Australian honours, being placed on the half back flank alongside then-captain Murphy. Finally, he was also named to represent the Australian team in the International Rules Series, played against Ireland international rules football team.

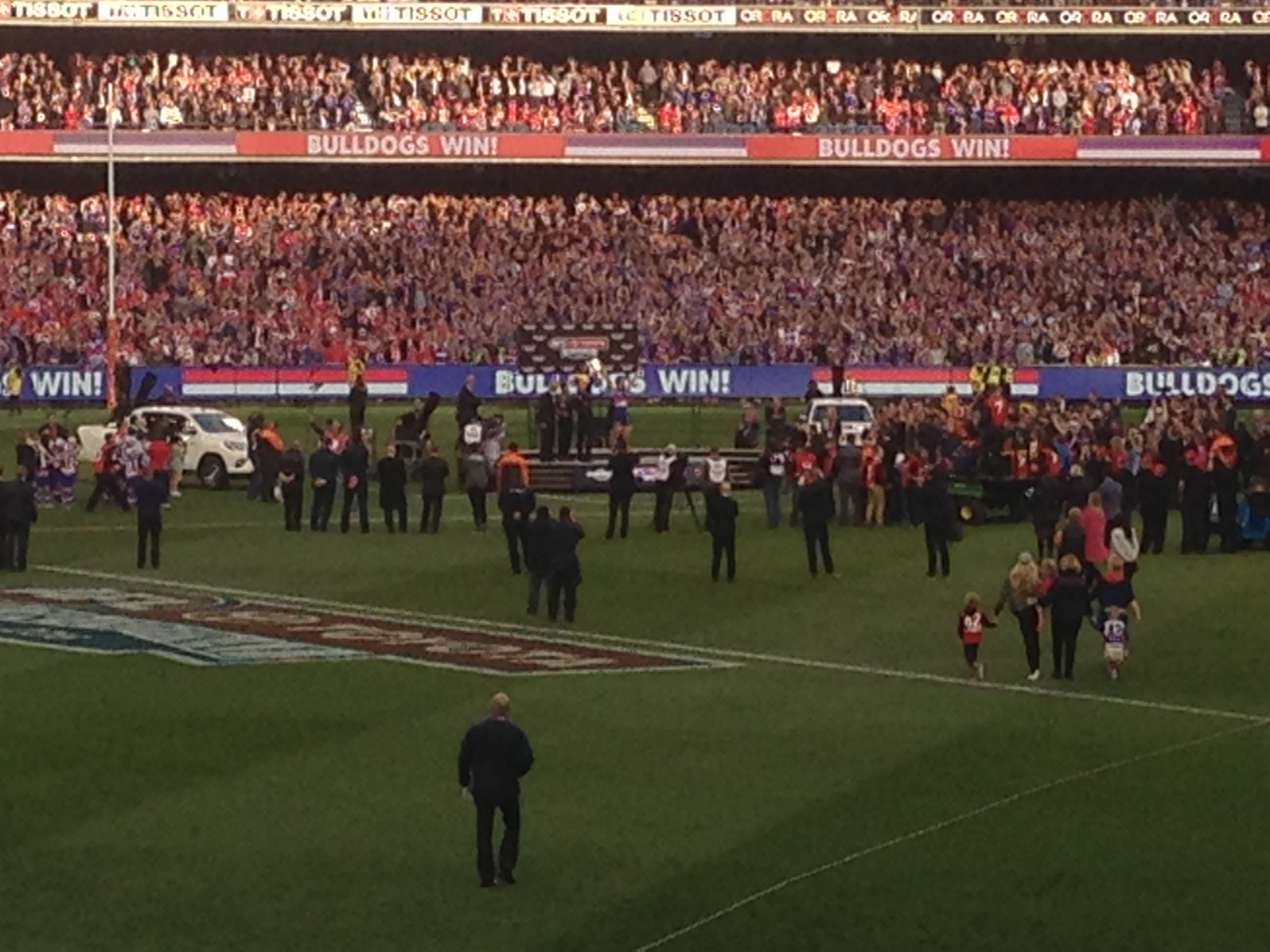
Easton Wood holding the premiership cup after the Bulldogs' grand final victory

Wood obtained premiership victory as a replacement captain in the successful year of 2016. Wood was named as vice captain at the beginning of the year. In Round 2 of the 2016 AFL season, Murphy injured his ACL, resulting in him missing out on the rest of the season. Wood was named to replace Murphy as the captain of the Bulldogs, and in this capacity led the club to premiership success in the 2016 AFL Grand Final over the Sydney Swans. Wood played 20 games in the 2016 AFL season. He broke his disposal record against Fremantle in Round 1, collecting 23 disposals, as well as 5 marks and a tackle. He had one of his best games in his career against Collingwood in Round 10, kicking 1 goal, taking 13 marks and collecting 21 disposals, one of the Bulldogs best on ground. Wood found luck in the newly introduced finals bye, as Wood suffered a minor injury in Round 22 and was close to missing out on the elimination final against West Coast, but because of the extra week had more time to recover and was able to play. Wood played all finals games and captained the Bulldogs to their 62-year-drought breaking premiership. However, Easton Wood did not make the Top 10 of the Charles Sutton Medal voting.

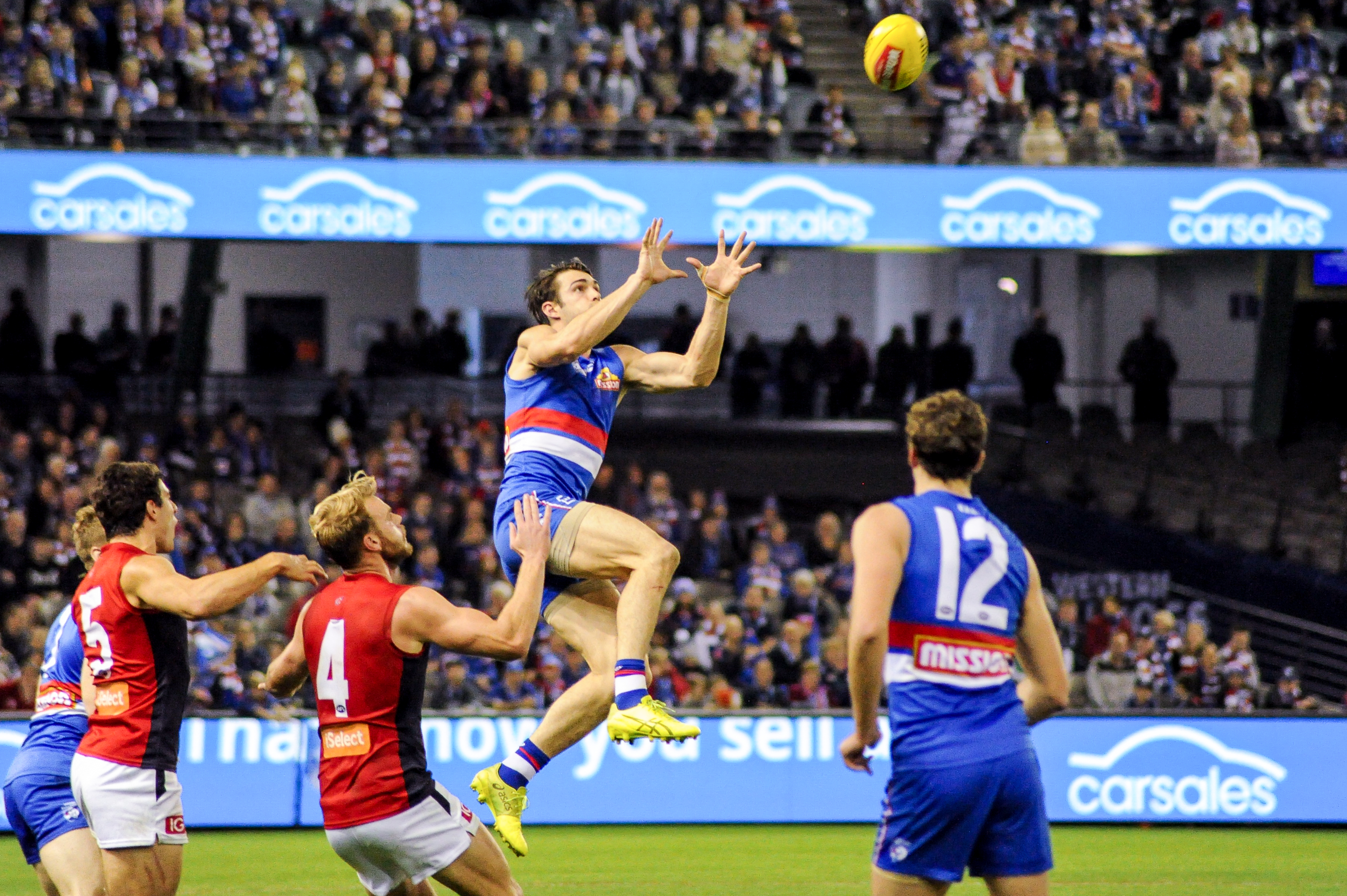
Wood marking the ball during a match in June 2017

In 2017, Wood returned to his role as vice captain after Murphy recovered from his injury and continued playing. Wood played 18 games, and continued to prove his reputation as a dangerous intercept player, leading the Bulldogs in intercept possessions, averaging 5.9 per game over his season. He had one of his best games of the season in the Dogs 7-point loss against West Coast in round 15 of the 2017 AFL season, collecting 21 disposals, gathering 4 tackle and taking 8 marks. A hamstring injury obtained in the Bulldogs's 14-point win over Brisbane Lions in the 20th round of the season ruled him out for the remainder of the season. Wood signed a three-year contract in June, keeping him at the club until 2020. Despite missing out on 4 rounds, Wood came 4th in the Charles Sutton Medal count for 2017, polling 138 votes, 47 votes behind first placed Marcus Bontempelli.

In 2018, Wood was named full-time captain of the club, following Murphy's retirement at the end of the 2017 AFL season. Unfortunately for him, his season was riddled with injury. Wood missed rounds 7 and 8 to a minor hamstring injury suffered in round 6. Then, in the Western Bulldogs' 57-point loss to Port Adelaide, he got a major hamstring injury and did not return to the team until Round 22. Wood stated at the conclusion of the season that although he was injured, the time off 'enabled him to gain a greater perspective of the bigger picture – including the development of the Dogs' youth.'

In contrast to Wood's horror 2018 season, he played every game of the 2019 AFL season. 2019 was to be his second and final year as the team's captain. Wood had one of his best games ever in their 27-point loss against St Kilda, picking up 23 disposals, 1 tackle, 4 rebounds and a remarkable 10 marks. Wood captained the Bulldogs all the way to the finals, where they lost to eventual runners up Greater Western Sydney. Wood showed off his high pressure playing style, completing 139 One-Percenters, taking 100 marks and laying 31 tackles throughout the year. Wood came 7th in the Charles Sutton Medal voting for 2019, polling 160 votes, 139 behind first-placed Marcus Bontempelli. In December 2019, Wood handed over the captaincy to triple Charles Sutton Medalist Marcus Bontempelli.

=== 2020–2021: Late career ===
While Wood no longer had captaincy, he retained his spot in the leadership group. Due to the COVID-19 pandemic, there were only 18 rounds, Wood missing rounds 2-4 and 15-17 due to quad and hamstring injuries respectively. A 13 disposal, 4 tackle, 7 mark game against Adelaide in round 12 of the 2020 AFL season was one of his best for the season, in that game obtaining a Mark of the Year nomination, winning 60.6% of the vote for that round. In late October, Wood signed a two-year contract extension, keeping him with the club until 2022. In April 2020, Wood's 2016 premiership medal was stolen from him. It is yet to be returned. On 22 October 2021, Wood announced his retirement after 188 games, the main cause being cited as his constant soft tissue injuries.

== Statistics ==
Statistics are correct to the end of the 2021 season

Legend
G	Goals	K	Kicks	D	Disposals	T	Tackles
B	Behinds	H	Handballs	M	Marks
#	Played in that season's premiership team

Season	Team	No.	Games	Totals							Averages (per game)						
Season	Team	No.	Games	G	B	K	H	D	M	T	G	B	K	H	D	M	T
2008	Western Bulldogs	29	0	—	—	—	—	—	—	—	—	—	—	—	—	—	—
2009	Western Bulldogs	29	2	0	2	11	9	20	3	2	0.0	1.0	5.5	4.5	10.0	1.5	1.0
2010	Western Bulldogs	29	11	2	1	53	74	127	36	20	0.2	0.1	4.8	6.7	11.5	3.3	1.8
2011	Western Bulldogs	29	15	2	2	109	72	181	59	32	0.1	0.1	7.3	4.8	12.1	3.9	2.1
2012	Western Bulldogs	10	14	1	1	121	85	206	75	17	0.1	0.1	8.6	6.1	14.7	5.4	1.2
2013	Western Bulldogs	10	5	1	2	27	27	54	13	5	0.2	0.4	5.4	5.4	10.8	2.6	1.0
2014	Western Bulldogs	10	18	1	2	131	142	273	62	42	0.1	0.1	7.3	7.9	15.2	3.4	2.3
2015	Western Bulldogs	10	22	5	0	224	167	391	155	31	0.2	0.0	10.2	7.6	17.8	7.0	1.4
2016^{#}	Western Bulldogs	10	20	3	0	180	146	326	127	29	0.2	0.0	9.0	7.3	16.3	6.4	1.5
2017	Western Bulldogs	10	18	3	4	150	104	254	96	29	0.2	0.2	8.3	5.8	14.1	5.3	1.6
2018	Western Bulldogs	10	12	0	0	101	64	165	63	17	0.0	0.0	8.4	5.3	13.8	5.3	1.4
2019	Western Bulldogs	10	23	0	2	175	92	267	100	31	0.0	0.1	7.6	4.0	11.6	4.3	1.3
2020 (Note: The 2020 season was played with 17 home-and-away matches per team (down from 22) and 16-minute quarters with time on (down from 20-minute quarters with time on) due to the impact of the COVID-19 pandemic.)	Western Bulldogs	10	13	0	0	79	45	124	50	19	0.0	0.0	6.1	3.5	9.5	3.9	1.5
2021	Western Bulldogs	10	15	2	0	111	65	176	70	22	0.1	0.0	7.4	4.3	11.7	4.3	1.5
Career			188	20	16	1472	1092	2564	909	296	0.1	0.1	7.8	5.8	13.6	4.8	1.6

== Honours and achievements ==
- Team
  - AFL premiership captain: 2016 (C)
  - Pre-season premiership player: 2010
- Individual
  - All-Australian: 2015
  - Charles Sutton Medal (Western Bulldogs B&F): 2015
  - Western Bulldogs captain: 2018 - 2019
