= Dick Collinson =

Australian rules footballer

Personal information
- Full name: Richard John Collinson
- Born: 28 May 1923; Ballarat, Victoria
- Died: 22 September 2013 (aged 90)
- Original team: West Footscray
- Height: 173 cm (5 ft 8 in)
- Weight: 80 kg (176 lb)

Playing career^{1}
Years	Club	Games (Goals)
1947	Footscray	2 (0)
- ^{1} Playing statistics correct to the end of 1947.

Richard John Collinson (28 May 1923 – 22 September 2013) was an Australian rules footballer who played with Footscray in the Victorian Football League (VFL).

Collinson served in the Australian Army during World War II prior to playing with Footscray.
