= Doug Hawkins =

Australian rules footballer, born 1960

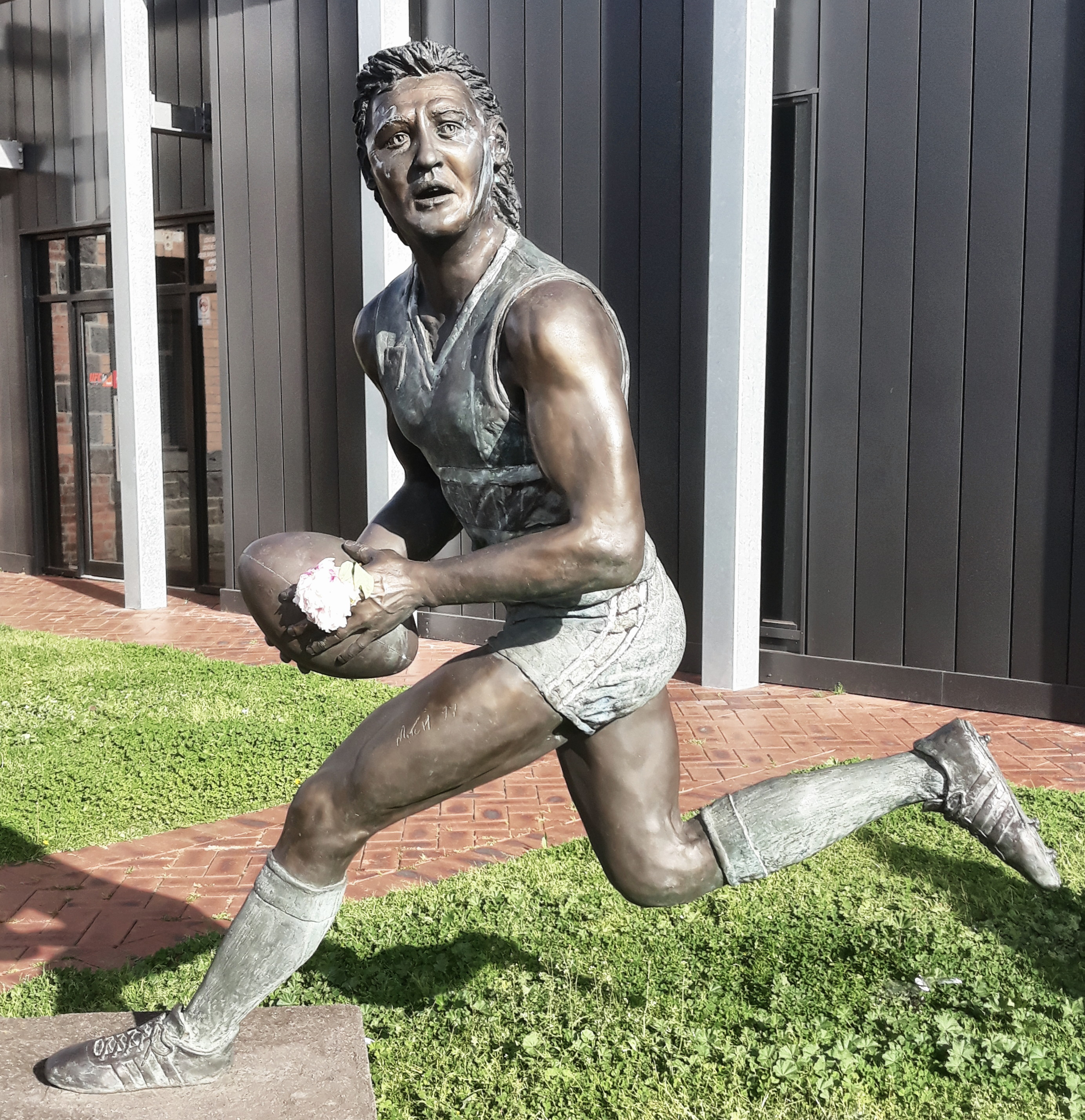
- Statue of Hawkins outside Braybrook Hotel

Personal information
- Nicknames: Dancing Dougie, Hawk
- Born: 5 May 1960 (age 66)
- Original team: Braybrook (WRFL)
- Height: 180 cm (5 ft 11 in)
- Weight: 79 kg (174 lb)
- Position: Midfielder/Half Forward

Playing career^{1}
Years	Club	Games (Goals)
1978–1994	Footscray	329 (216)
1995	Fitzroy	21 (11)
Total		350 (227)

Representative team honours
Years	Team	Games (Goals)
	Victoria	5 (?)
- ^{1} Playing statistics correct to the end of 1995.

Career highlights
- Charles Sutton Medal: 1985; Footscray leading Goal Kicker: 1991; Footscray Captain: 1990–1993; VFL Team of the Year: 1984, 1986

Douglas James Hawkins (born 5 May 1960) is a former Australian rules footballer who represented Footscray and Fitzroy in the Australian Football League (AFL). He also enjoyed a brief career in media and ran for the Senate, as a member of Palmer United Party, in the 2013 Australian federal election.

== Early career ==
Hawkins hailed from the industrialised, working class western suburbs of Melbourne, and although he was a North Melbourne supporter in his youth, competition zoning rules in effect prior to the adoption of a national draft, dictated that Hawkins' rights were 'zoned' to Footscray, given his suburb of residence was nearby Braybrook. He got his wish, making his VFL debut for Footscray in 1978 as a teenager.

== Football career ==
=== Footscray ===
Hawkins made his debut in Round 1 1978, against the team he grew up barracking for, the North Melbourne Kangaroos, he recorded 7 disposals and a goal. He played 18 games in his debut season, recording 241 disposals and kicking 11 goals for the season. He played all 22 games in his second season and kicked 17 goals. Over the next few years, he began to make a name for himself as one of the finest wingers the game has ever seen, so much so that at the team's home ground, the Western Oval, the outer wing of the ground was named the "Doug Hawkins Wing".

Hawkins made the VFL team of the year for the first time in the 1984 season, a season in which Hawkins amassed 446 disposals and booted 9 goals for the year. His finest individual season came in 1985, winning the Charles Sutton Medal, his first and only best and fairest award of his career. 1985 saw Hawkins rack up 531 disposals and kick 7 goals for the year. He backed up his 1985 season by making the VFL team of the year again in 1986.

== Captaincy ==
Hawkins was named Captain of Footscray at the beginning of the 1990 season, taking over from Stephen Wallis, he captained the club from 1990 to 1993 and Hawkins was played uncharacteristically as a small forward, as opposed to the wing. He kicked 38 goals in 1991 to win the club goalkicking and followed it up in 1992 with 42 goals. His final season for Footscray came in 1994, with one of his last game's being a famous one, as he broke Ted Whitten's long-standing club record of 321 for Footscray, and Whitten was on hand to congratulate him.

== Fitzroy ==
However, after playing 329 games and kicking 216 goals for the Bulldogs, at the conclusion of the 1994 season his contract was not renewed, so he moved to the Fitzroy Football Club for the 1995 season; he played 21 games and kicked 11 goals for the club before announcing his retirement.

== Statistics ==
Legend
G	Goals	K	Kicks	D	Disposals	T	Tackles
B	Behinds	H	Handballs	M	Marks

Season	Team	No.	Games	Totals							Averages (per game)						
Season	Team	No.	Games	G	B	K	H	D	M	T	G	B	K	H	D	M	T
1978	Footscray	7	18	11	7	157	84	241	65	—N/a	0.6	0.4	8.7	4.7	13.4	3.6	—N/a
1979	Footscray	7	22	17	13	279	106	385	64	—N/a	0.8	0.6	12.7	4.8	17.5	2.9	—N/a
1980	Footscray	7	12	5	7	138	81	219	38	—N/a	0.4	0.6	11.5	6.8	18.3	3.2	—N/a
1981	Footscray	7	21	12	11	219	189	408	73	—N/a	0.6	0.5	10.4	9.0	19.4	3.5	—N/a
1982	Footscray	7	16	5	5	198	132	330	48	—N/a	0.3	0.3	12.4	8.3	20.6	3.0	—N/a
1983	Footscray	7	19	6	6	254	179	433	74	—N/a	0.3	0.3	13.4	9.4	22.8	3.9	—N/a
1984	Footscray	7	22	9	13	290	156	446	99	—N/a	0.4	0.6	13.2	7.1	20.3	4.5	—N/a
1985	Footscray	7	24	7	8	349	182	531	172	—N/a	0.3	0.3	14.5	7.6	22.1	7.2	—N/a
1986	Footscray	7	16	2	4	198	98	296	92	—N/a	0.1	0.3	12.4	6.1	18.5	5.8	—N/a
1987	Footscray	7	12	6	2	144	90	234	72	8	0.5	0.2	12.0	7.5	19.5	6.0	0.7
1988	Footscray	7	20	7	3	198	161	359	90	22	0.4	0.2	9.9	8.1	18.0	4.5	1.1
1989	Footscray	7	20	8	4	266	206	472	127	33	0.4	0.2	13.3	10.3	23.6	6.4	1.7
1990	Footscray	7	21	28	12	248	145	393	101	16	1.3	0.6	11.8	6.9	18.7	4.8	0.8
1991	Footscray	7	22	38	33	248	119	367	116	20	1.7	1.5	11.3	5.4	16.7	5.3	0.9
1992	Footscray	7	23	42	22	254	155	409	123	26	1.8	1.0	11.0	6.7	17.8	5.3	1.1
1993	Footscray	7	20	6	11	200	156	356	88	21	0.3	0.6	10.0	7.8	17.8	4.4	1.1
1994	Footscray	7	21	7	8	143	88	231	53	23	0.3	0.4	6.8	4.2	11.0	2.5	1.1
1995	Fitzroy	3	21	11	3	180	162	342	68	32	0.5	0.1	8.6	7.7	16.3	3.2	1.5
Career			350	227	172	3963	2489	6452	1563	201	0.6	0.5	11.3	7.1	18.4	4.5	1.1

== Accolades and Honours ==
During his playing career, Hawkins won the club best and fairest award in 1985, represented Victoria five times, and was named in the AFL Team of the Year in 1984 and 1986. Upon reaching 300 senior games, he was awarded AFL Life Membership in 1993. After retiring, Hawkins was awarded Father of the Year in 1998 and was one of the torch bearers for the 2000 Olympic Games. When the Bulldogs' Team of the Century was announced in 2002, Hawkins was named on the wing as vice-captain. In 2004, he was inducted into the AFL Hall of Fame. In 2010, he was inducted into the Western Bulldogs Hall of Fame before being upgraded to Club Legend status in 2014.

== Media career ==
Off the field, Hawkins was known as an old-fashioned Aussie larrikin, someone who himself acknowledged he was not one of the smartest people going around, but was always up for a laugh. As a panel member of the Nine Network's The Footy Show during the mid-1990s, he was often portrayed as the show's court jester. In 1998, Hawkins moved to the Seven Network and appeared on a Wednesday night rival to The Footy Show, Live and Kicking.

== Politics ==
Hawkins stood as a candidate for a Victorian Senate seat in the 2013 Australian Federal Election as a member of Palmer United Party.

== Personal life ==
Hawkins is married to Raelene, who appeared on Fox Footy's Living with Footballers before it was axed at the end of 2004. They have three children – a son and two daughters. Doug currently resides near Bacchus Marsh and has served as a coach of the Bacchus Marsh Football Club.

== Bibliography ==
- Lovett, Michael, ed. (2013). AFL Record Season Guide 2013. Docklands, VIC: AFL Media. ISSN 1839-8383.
