= Charles Sutton Medal =

Australian rules football award

- Sport: Australian rules football
- Awarded for: The best and fairest player at the Western Bulldogs Football Club
- Location: Crown Palladium
- Country: Australia
- Presented by: Western Bulldogs Football Club

History
- First award: 1927
- First winner: Ivan McAlpine
- Most wins: Scott West and Marcus Bontempelli (7 times each)
- Most recent: Marcus Bontempelli (2026)

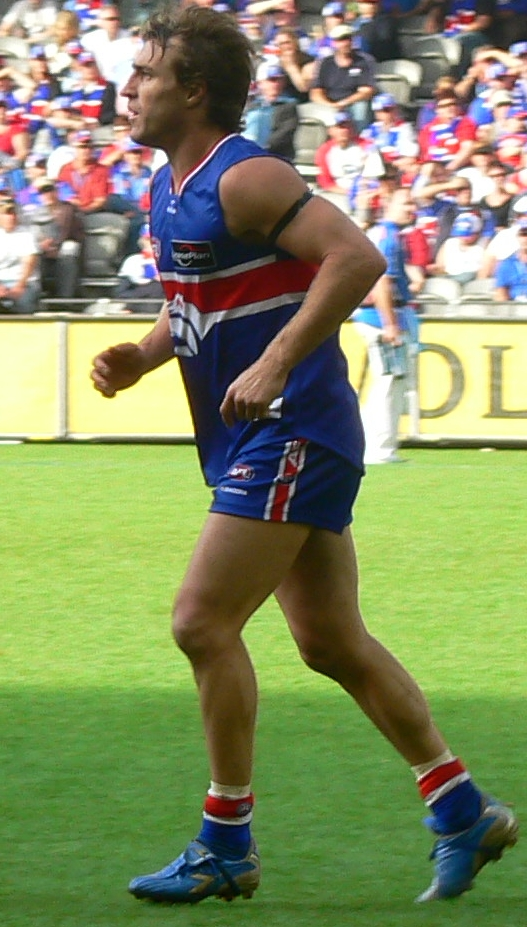
Scott West has won the award a joint record seven times.

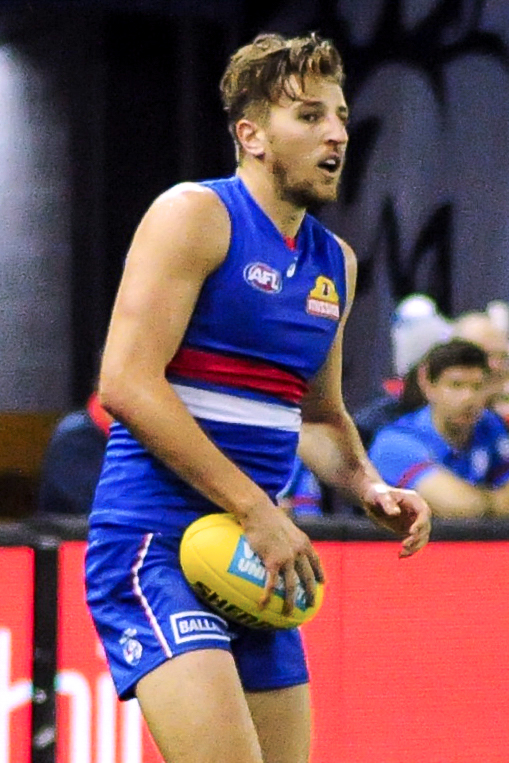
Marcus Bontempelli has also won the award seven times.

The Charles Sutton Medal is an Australian rules football award presented annually to the player adjudged best and fairest for the Western Bulldogs throughout the Victorian Football League/Australian Football League season. The medal is named after 1950 winner Charlie Sutton, who was the Bulldogs' 1954 premiership captain-coach. There were many previous names for the medal, which was originally known as the McCarthy Trophy from 1927 to 1939, named after Con McCarthy, who played a key part in getting the club entry into the Victorian Football League. It was also called the Con Weickhardt trophy (also known as the Con Curtain trophy) from 1940 to 1954. It was named after the man who chaired the club for 4 years. It was renamed to its current name in 1955. The inaugural winner for the award was Ivan McAlpine in 1927.

The voting system as of the 2019 AFL season, consists of five members of the Western Bulldogs match committee awarding a score from zero to five for each player after every game. The maximum score that can be obtained after one game is 25. Five players have won the award while also winning the Brownlow Medal, the best and fairest award for the Australian Football League. Those players were Norman Ware (1941), John Schultz (1960), Gary Dempsey (1975), Kelvin Templeton (1980) and Scott Wynd (1992). Scott West and Marcus Bontempelli jointly hold the record for most Charles Sutton Medals at the club, winning the accolade seven times each; 1995, 1997, 1998, 2000, 2003, 2004 and 2005 for West and 2016, 2017, 2019, 2021, 2023, 2024 and 2026 for Bontempelli. Gary Dempsey is in second with a total of six. Dempsey also holds the record for most Charles Sutton Medals won consecutively, his streak running from 1973 to 1977, a total of five years.

== Recipients ==
^	Denotes current player
+	Player won Brownlow Medal in same season

Season	Recipient(s)	Ref.
1927	Ivan McAlpine	
1928	Alby Outen	
1929	Bill Russ	
1930	Ivan McAlpine (2)	
1931	Allan Hopkins	
1932	Ivan McAlpine (3)	
1933	Alby Morrison	
1934	Norman Ware	
1935	George Bennett	
1936	Alby Morrison (2)	
1937	Norman Ware (2)	
1938	Norman Ware (3)	
1939	Harry Hickey	
1940	Norman Ware (4)	
1941	Arthur Olliver	
1941	Norman Ware+ (5)	
1942	Ted Ellis	
1943	Allan Collins	
1944	Arthur Olliver (2)	
1945	Harry Hickey (2)	
1946	Joe Ryan	
1947	Joe Ryan (2)	
1948	Harry Hickey (3)	
1949	Wally Donald	
1950	Charlie Sutton	
1951	Jack Collins	
1952	Jack Collins (2)	
1953	Harvey Stevens	
1954	Ted Whitten	
1955	Peter Box	
1956	Don Ross	
1957	Ted Whitten (2)	
1958	Ted Whitten (3)	
1959	Ted Whitten (4)	
1960	John Schultz+	
1961	Ted Whitten (5)	
1962	John Schultz (2)	
1963	Ray Walker	
1964	John Schultz (3)	
1965	John Schultz (4)	
1966	John Schultz (5)	
1967	John Jillard	
1968	David Thorpe	
1969	George Bisset	
1970	Gary Dempsey	
1971	David Thorpe (2)	
1972	Peter Welsh	
1973	Gary Dempsey (2)	
1974	Gary Dempsey (3)	
1975	Gary Dempsey+ (4)	
1976	Gary Dempsey (5)	
1977	Gary Dempsey (6)	
1978	Kelvin Templeton	
1979	Ian Dunstan	
1980	Kelvin Templeton+ (2)	
1981	Ian Dunstan (2)	
1982	Ian Dunstan (3)	
1983	Brian Royal	
1984	Andrew Purser	
1985	Doug Hawkins	
1986	Brad Hardie	
1987	Tony McGuinness	
1988	Terry Wallace	
1989	Terry Wallace (2)	
1990	Peter Foster	
1991	Tony Liberatore	
1992	Scott Wynd+	
1993	Leon Cameron	
1994	Chris Grant	
1995	Scott West	
1996	Chris Grant	
1996	Jose Romero	
1997	Scott West (2)	
1998	Scott West (3)	
1999	Brad Johnson	
2000	Scott West (4)	
2001	Luke Darcy	
2002	Brad Johnson (2)	
2003	Scott West (5)	
2004	Scott West (6)	
2005	Scott West (7)	
2006	Brad Johnson (3)	
2007	Brian Lake	
2008	Daniel Cross	
2009	Matthew Boyd	
2010	Ryan Griffen	
2011	Matthew Boyd (2)	
2012	Matthew Boyd (3)	
2013	Ryan Griffen (2)	
2014	Tom Liberatore	
2015	Easton Wood	
2016	Marcus Bontempelli^	
2017	Marcus Bontempelli^ (2)	
2018	Lachie Hunter	
2019	Marcus Bontempelli^ (3)	
2020	Caleb Daniel	
2021	Marcus Bontempelli^ (4)	
2022	Josh Dunkley	
2023	Marcus Bontempelli^ (5)	
2024	Marcus Bontempelli^ (6)	
2025	Ed Richards	
2026	Marcus Bontempelli ^ (7)	

== Multiple winners ==
^	Denotes current player

Player	Medals	Seasons
Scott West	7	1995, 1997, 1998, 2000, 2003, 2004, 2005
Marcus Bontempelli^	7	2016, 2017, 2019, 2021, 2023, 2024, 2026
Gary Dempsey	6	1970, 1973, 1974, 1975, 1976, 1977
John Schultz	5	1960, 1962, 1964, 1965, 1966
Norman Ware	5	1934, 1937, 1938, 1940, 1941
Ted Whitten	5	1954, 1957, 1958, 1959, 1961
Matthew Boyd	3	2009, 2011, 2012
Ian Dunstan	3	1979, 1981, 1982
Harry Hickey	3	1939, 1945, 1948
Brad Johnson	3	1999, 2002, 2006
Ivan McAlpine	3	1927, 1930, 1932
Jack Collins	2	1951, 1952
Chris Grant	2	1994, 1996
Ryan Griffen	2	2010, 2013
Alby Morrison	2	1933, 1936
Arthur Olliver	2	1941, 1944
Joe Ryan	2	1946, 1947
Kelvin Templeton	2	1978, 1980
David Thorpe	2	1968, 1971
Terry Wallace	2	1988, 1989
