= Chris Grant (footballer) =

Australian rules footballer, born 1972

Personal information
- Full name: Christopher Lee Grant
- Born: 13 December 1972 (age 53); Daylesford, Victoria
- Original team: Daylesford
- Draft: No. 105, 1988 national draft
- Height: 193 cm (6 ft 4 in)
- Weight: 99 kg (218 lb)
- Position: Full Forward/Centre Half Back

Playing career^{1}
Years	Club	Games (Goals)
1990–2007	Footscray/Western Bulldogs	341 (554)
- ^{1} Playing statistics correct to the end of 2007.

Career highlights
- Most votes in the 1997 Brownlow Medal (but ineligible to win); 2× Charles Sutton Medal 1994, 1996; All-Australian team 1997, 1998, 1999; Western Bulldogs captain 2000–2004; Australian Football Hall of Fame inducted 2012

Christopher Lee Grant (born 13 December 1972) is a former Australian rules football player in the Australian Football League, a legend of the Western Bulldogs and a member of the Australian Football Hall of Fame. He was born in Daylesford, Victoria, Australia.

== AFL career ==
Grant was recruited by the Footscray Football Club (now Western Bulldogs) in the 1988 VFL Draft at pick number 105, and played his first AFL game in 1990 at the age of 17. Grant kicked 51 goals that season, the youngest player in VFL-AFL history to achieve this feat, to be the leading goalkicker for the club.

Over the following years, Grant established himself as a respected player in the half-forward position. He earned All-Australian honours in 1994 and 1996. He appeared in the 1997 documentary Year of the Dogs alongside the rest of the Footscray team. He polled 27 votes in the 1997 Brownlow Medal, one more than winner Robert Harvey; however, he was ineligible for the award due to a one-match suspension for striking Hawthorn's Nick Holland. The incident (high contact while attempting to spoil a mark) was not deemed reportable by the umpires but Director of Football Operations Ian Collins decided Grant should be sent to the tribunal.

In 2001 he was named team captain, and was selected as a member of the Footscray & Western Bulldogs 'Team of the Century' in 2002. He missed the 2003 season to an ACL injury sustained in Round 1; his absence in the team was severely felt as the Bulldogs ended up finishing last on the AFL ladder. He relinquished the captaincy at the end of the 2004 season.

Grant played over 300 games and scored more than 500 goals throughout his career, an astonishing feat considering he spent much of his career at centre half back, playing on the game's best key forwards. He won the club best-and-fairest award in 1994 and 1996 (and came second in 1997, 1998, and 1999, and third in 2001). He gained third place in the 1996 Brownlow Medal. He received All-Australian Honours in 1997, 1998, and 1999. He was the club's leading goal-kicker in 1990 and 1994.

In playing his 330th game on 5 August 2006, Grant broke Doug Hawkins' record for most games played for the Western Bulldogs. He held the club games record until 2009, when he was passed by Brad Johnson.

Near the end of 1996 Grant was offered a large amount of money to move to Port Adelaide, but his decision to stay with the Western Bulldogs was helped along by a little boy, Ryan Adams, who sent Grant a letter with a 20-cent piece attached saying it was all he had and that Grant could keep it if he stayed with the Bulldogs.

Grant announced his retirement from senior football at the Bulldogs' best-and-fairest presentation on 2 October 2007, following a career that spanned 18 seasons and 341 games.

Chris Grant came out of retirement to represent his old club in Daylesford and in his first game of the season kicked 11 goals.

Grant continues to support the Western Bulldogs. He held the director role of the club's football department until he resigned in 2024 as a result of a tumultuous relationship with head coach Luke Beveridge. Grant was noted not to have attended the club's centenary function gala, as he was announced in the top five of Bulldog greats.

== Personal life ==
Grant's daughter, Isabella Grant, began playing for the Western Bulldogs' AFL Women's team in the 2020 AFL Women's season after being drafted to the club as a father–daughter selection.

== Statistics ==
Season	Team	No.	Games	Totals							Averages (per game)						
Season	Team	No.	Games	G	B	K	H	D	M	T	G	B	K	H	D	M	T
1990	Footscray	29	20	51	31	161	39	200	102	15	2.6	1.6	8.1	2.0	10.0	5.1	0.8
1991	Footscray	29	15	18	15	113	77	190	75	7	1.2	1.0	7.5	5.1	12.7	5.0	0.5
1992	Footscray	29	24	50	28	249	140	389	133	36	2.1	1.2	10.4	5.8	16.2	5.5	1.5
1993	Footscray	29	17	33	22	200	62	262	109	14	1.9	1.3	11.8	3.6	15.4	6.4	0.8
1994	Footscray	3	24	71	57	264	77	341	155	18	3.0	2.4	11.0	3.2	14.2	6.5	0.8
1995	Footscray	3	22	38	26	214	101	315	133	24	1.7	1.2	9.7	4.6	14.3	6.0	1.1
1996	Footscray	3	22	16	12	267	101	368	135	27	0.7	0.5	12.1	4.6	16.7	6.1	1.2
1997	Western Bulldogs	3	23	37	22	281	148	429	170	29	1.6	1.0	12.2	6.4	18.7	7.4	1.3
1998	Western Bulldogs	3	22	42	34	294	117	411	185	39	1.9	1.5	13.4	5.3	18.7	8.4	1.8
1999	Western Bulldogs	3	24	37	29	284	137	421	176	33	1.5	1.2	11.8	5.7	17.5	7.3	1.4
2000	Western Bulldogs	3	17	40	20	193	70	263	105	24	2.4	1.2	11.4	4.1	15.5	6.2	1.4
2001	Western Bulldogs	3	22	46	30	228	95	323	110	58	2.1	1.4	10.4	4.3	14.7	5.0	2.6
2002	Western Bulldogs	3	21	17	17	196	109	305	111	32	0.8	0.8	9.3	5.2	14.5	5.3	1.5
2003	Western Bulldogs	3	1	0	0	9	5	14	5	0	0.0	0.0	9.0	5.0	14.0	5.0	0.0
2004	Western Bulldogs	3	22	0	8	180	109	289	106	32	0.0	0.4	8.2	5.0	13.1	4.8	1.5
2005	Western Bulldogs	3	16	26	5	115	39	154	58	33	1.6	0.3	7.2	2.4	9.6	3.6	2.1
2006	Western Bulldogs	3	24	28	16	192	97	289	113	38	1.2	0.7	8.0	4.0	12.0	4.7	1.6
2007	Western Bulldogs	3	5	4	2	36	15	51	22	7	0.8	0.4	7.2	3.0	10.2	4.4	1.4
Career			341	554	374	3476	1538	5014	2003	466	1.6	1.1	10.2	4.5	14.7	5.9	1.4
