= Gary Dempsey (Australian footballer) =

Australian rules footballer, born 1948

Personal information
- Born: 22 November 1948 (age 77)
- Original team: Footscray Technical School Old Boys
- Debut: Round 1, 1967, Footscray vs. Geelong, at Kardinia Park
- Height: 197 cm (6 ft 6 in)
- Weight: 100 kg (220 lb)
- Position: Ruckman/Tall defender

Playing career^{1}
Years	Club	Games (Goals)
1967–1978	Footscray	207 (105)
1979–1984	North Melbourne	122 (39)
Total		329 (144)

Representative team honours
Years	Team	Games (Goals)
	Victoria	22 (8)
- ^{1} Playing statistics correct to the end of 1984.

Career highlights
- Brownlow Medal: (1975); 6× Charles Sutton Medal: (1970, 1973, 1974, 1975, 1976, 1977); Syd Barker Medal: (1979); Footscray captain (1971–1972, 1977–1978); Footscray Team of the Century (Ruck); North Melbourne Team of the Century (Emergency); All-Australian team: (1972); AFL Hall of Fame, inducted 1996; Represented Australia in "The Galahs" Australian Football World Tour 1968.

Gary Dempsey (born 22 November 1948) is a former Australian rules footballer who played for the Footscray Football Club and North Melbourne Football Club in the Victorian Football League (VFL).
A fine ruckman known for his strong marking, Dempsey won the Brownlow Medal in 1975 and had a total of thirteen top-10 finishes in the vote count. He is also one of a handful of players to have played at least 100 games and won a best-and-fairest award at two different clubs.

== Playing career ==
Dempsey made his debut for Footscray in 1967. In 1969, he spent six weeks in hospital after being badly burnt by a bushfire near his home in Truganina and was told he would never play football again. Despite this, he defied the odds to return to the playing field and then win his first club best-and-fairest award in 1970. Dempsey would win the club best-and-fairest award five more times, underlining his importance to the underachieving Bulldogs.

Although he had won a number of individual awards, Dempsey yearned for team success and signed with North Melbourne in 1979, winning the club best-and-fairest in his first year there. He played out his career at the Kangaroos, playing 122 games for them, and retired in 1984. Dempsey was named an emergency in the Kangaroos Team of the Century.

Dempsey finished in the top 10 in the Brownlow Medal 13 times. He was named an All-Australian Team member at the 1972 Perth carnival.

Dempsey went into the 1984 VFL season affected by injuries and advancing age. He was now 35—a "dinosaur" as he would describe himself in his retirement announcement—and had suffered a hurt knee in the practice games and later a fractured cheekbone. His final VFL match was in Round 8 against Sydney at Arden Street, which the Swans won by seven points. He revealed that he had begun thinking about retirement midway through the last quarter: "I was playing at fullback and I realised I was not helping North. There's no point in me going on if I can't help North." He formally announced his retirement on the Monday following the game.

Gary Dempsey then moved north in 1986 and played two seasons for Southport, winning his first ever senior premiership with the Sharks in 1987.

Dempsey held the all-time record for most marks in VFL/AFL history until his record was surpassed in 2017 by Nick Riewoldt.

In 1996, Dempsey was inducted into the Australian Football Hall of Fame.

In 2002, Dempsey was named as first ruckman in the Footscray's Team of the Century.

== Post-playing career ==
Dempsey was appointed specialist ruck coach of the Carlton Football Club at the end of the 2005 season.

== Bibliography ==
- Ross, John (1999). The Australian Football Hall of Fame. Australia: HarperCollinsPublishers. p. 59. ISBN 0-7322-6426-X.
