= Jack Collins (footballer, born 1930) =

Australian rules footballer (1930–2008)

Personal information
- Full name: John Charles Collins
- Born: 3 January 1930
- Died: 6 July 2008 (aged 78); Werribee
- Original team: Yarraville Football Club

Playing career
Years	Club	Games (Goals)
1950–1958	Footscray	154 (385)

Career highlights
- VFL leading goalkicker: 1954; Coleman Medal: 1957; VFL premiership player: 1954; 5× Footscray leading goalkicker: 1953, 1954, 1955, 1957, 1958; 2× Charles Sutton Medal: 1951, 1952

John Charles "Jack" Collins (3 January 1930 – 6 July 2008) was an Australian rules footballer who represented Footscray in the Victorian Football League (VFL).

His father, Jim Collins, who had been the captain-coach of the Yarraville Football Club from 1918 to 1919, played 30 senior games for Essendon from 1919 to 1921.

Collins was recruited to Footscray in 1950 from the Yarraville Football Club, and, for the next two years, he won the club's best-and-fairest award (later designated the Charles Sutton Medal).

In 1953, Collins fronted the VFL Tribunal twice. In June, he was cleared of a striking charge against South Melbourne captain Ron Clegg, but later in the season he was involved in an incident with Collingwood's Frank Tuck. Both players were reported following a fierce fight and were subsequently suspended. Collins' four-week suspension meant he would miss the finals of the 1953 VFL season in which Footscray finished third.

Collins' return to the side in Round 3 the following season could not have happened sooner. As one of the flag favourites, Footscray had lost their first two games to St Kilda and Richmond before they beat South Melbourne by 87 points; Collins starred with eight goals. The following week, he would kick nine before against Carlton. Collins kicked four goals in the semi-final win over Geelong and then starred in the 1954 VFL Grand Final, kicking seven goals as Footscray claimed their first premiership. Collins ended the season as the VFL Leading Goalkicker with 84 goals. He was the leading goalkicker, again, in the 1957 VFL season with a total of 74 goals.

After retiring from football after 154 games and 385 goals, Collins served as a players representative, then secretary, and finally president of the club. Collins was active in moves to save the Footscray Football Club when the club nearly merged with Fitzroy in 1989.

Collins was a personal friend of murdered lawyer Keith William Allan, and gave evidence at each of the three trials in the Supreme Court of Victoria in which three persons were charged with Allan's murder.
