= Bob Murphy (footballer) =

Australian rules footballer (born 1982)

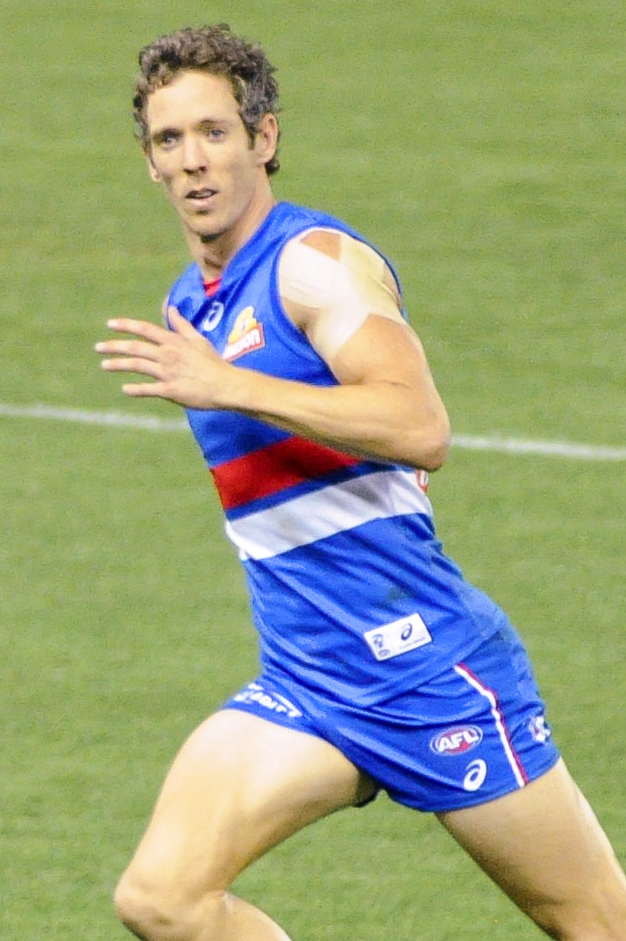
- Murphy playing in March 2017

Personal information
- Full name: Robert Murphy
- Born: 9 June 1982 (age 44)
- Original teams: Warragul (GFL); Gippsland Power (TAC Cup)
- Draft: No. 13, 1999 national draft
- Height: 187 cm (6 ft 2 in)
- Weight: 81 kg (179 lb)
- Position: Defender / midfielder

Playing career^{1}
Years	Club	Games (Goals)
2000–2017	Western Bulldogs	312 (183)

Representative team honours
Years	Team	Games (Goals)
2008	Victoria	1 (1)
- ^{1} Playing statistics correct to the end of 2017.

Career highlights
- Pre Season Premiership Player: 2010; Western Bulldogs captain: 2015–2017; 2× All-Australian team: 2011, 2015 (captain); AFLPA captain of the year: 2015; AFL Rising Star nominee: 2001

Robert Murphy (born 9 June 1982) is a former professional Australian rules footballer who played for the Western Bulldogs in the Australian Football League (AFL). He played with them for his entire AFL career - beginning in 2000, captaining the team from 2015, then retiring in 2017. Since then he has pursued a career in media and is currently the co-host of Breakfast on ABC Radio Melbourne, as of February 2026.

== Early life ==
Murphy is the third and youngest child of John and Monica Murphy. Both parents belonged formerly to Catholic orders, John as a priest and Monica as a nun. He has one brother, Ben, and a sister, Bridget.

== AFL career ==
Murphy was drafted to the Western Bulldogs with pick 13 in the 1999 National Draft. After spending much of the 2000 season developing his slim frame, he made his debut in round 19 against Carlton at Princes Park, gathering 13 disposals and kicking a goal in a thrilling three-point victory. In 2001 he was nominated for the AFL Rising Star award in round 16 after playing St Kilda.

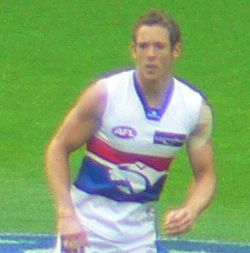
Murphy in 2008

In 2005, under new coach Rodney Eade, Murphy cemented a place as a small centre half forward. He kicked 33 goals from this position and his overhead marking and leading ability were invaluable to the team. As part of the leadership group he led his younger teammates by great example across the half forward line.

On 26 May 2006 Murphy injured his left knee during a horrible collision in the Bulldogs' 34-point loss to Collingwood. This injury caused him to miss the remainder of the 2006 season, including what would have been his first finals series. After successful reconstruction, he returned to action in the 2007 NAB Cup series in February 2007. He injured his right knee early in the 2008 season, but played on for the remainder of the season, before undergoing surgery to repair a damaged patellar tendon in September 2008.

Murphy was back to form resembling his best in 2010, when he posted his second top-five finish in the club best and fairest. He spent more time across half-back, where his disposal and decision-making were up to his usual high standard. In games against Essendon and Fremantle he collected a career-best 28 disposals. He missed three games mid-year with a knee injury which was again aggravated in the preliminary final, requiring post-season surgery.

In 2011 he had one of his best ever seasons, finishing second in the Bulldogs' best and fairest award, and earning his first selection in an All-Australian team, being named on a half-back flank.

In 2015 he was named captain of the year at the AFLPA awards becoming the fourth player to win the award in his first year as a captain and was also named captain of the all Australian team becoming the first ever player to have collected both honours in the same season.

On 10 April 2016, in the final minutes of the Bulldogs three-point loss to Hawthorn, Murphy sustained a knee injury while contesting a mark in the Hawks' forward 50. Scans later revealed he had injured his knee and had sustained a season-ending ruptured anterior cruciate ligament. Murphy later confirmed that he would play on for the Dogs in the 2017 season, and he ultimately missed the club's premiership win in October of 2016. Easton Wood was named as his replacement as captain. Robert Murphy played the final game of his career in round 23. 2017, where he collected 15 disposals and pre goal in a nine-point loss to Hawthorn.

== Media career ==
Murphy contributes a regular sports column to The Age. An article he wrote about playing against Steve Johnson earned him a highly commended prize in the 2012 Australian Football Media Association awards.

He was formerly a regular panelist on the AFL 360 television talk show on Fox Footy. In 2018, in collaboration with Fox Footy, he released his own short weekly series called Bob where he interviewed a number of Australian icons. Murphy formerly hosted the Western Bulldogs' podcast "Freedom in a Cage" along with retired basketball player Chris Anstey, and also co-hosted the Official Bulldogs podcast Barkly Street alongside captain of the Western Bulldogs, Marcus Bontempelli.

In mid-2019, Murphy joined Andy Maher to host the late afternoon drive show on 1116 SEN radio. In September 2021, it was announced that Murphy would leave his Melbourne-based media roles and move to Perth to become Fremantle Football Club's Head of Football Operations and Performance. Since then, he has relocated to Melbourne.

In November 2024, Murphy joined ABC Radio Melbourne as the co-host of Breakfast with journalist Sharnelle Vella. In 2025 he also appeared as a contestant on Claire Hooper's House of Games.

== Personal life ==
Murphy is married to wife Justine, and has three children – a son, and two daughters.

== Statistics ==
Legend
G	Goals	K	Kicks	D	Disposals	T	Tackles
B	Behinds	H	Handballs	M	Marks

Season	Team	No.	Games	Totals							Averages (per game)						
Season	Team	No.	Games	G	B	K	H	D	M	T	G	B	K	H	D	M	T
2000	Western Bulldogs	22	3	1	0	13	7	20	4	1	0.3	0.0	4.3	2.3	6.7	1.3	0.3
2001	Western Bulldogs	2	16	2	0	105	60	165	45	16	0.1	0.0	6.6	3.8	10.3	2.8	1.0
2002	Western Bulldogs	2	19	5	6	196	94	290	93	27	0.3	0.3	10.3	4.9	15.3	4.9	1.4
2003	Western Bulldogs	2	22	5	3	273	101	374	98	31	0.2	0.1	12.4	4.6	17.0	4.5	1.4
2004	Western Bulldogs	2	19	16	8	218	69	287	85	40	0.8	0.4	11.5	3.6	15.1	4.5	2.1
2005	Western Bulldogs	2	22	33	19	284	77	361	172	26	1.5	0.9	12.9	3.5	16.4	7.8	1.2
2006	Western Bulldogs	2	9	13	12	97	22	119	70	11	1.4	1.3	10.8	2.4	13.2	7.8	1.2
2007	Western Bulldogs	2	17	19	13	188	45	233	110	23	1.1	0.8	11.1	2.6	13.7	6.5	1.4
2008	Western Bulldogs	2	24	34	18	321	108	429	209	42	1.4	0.8	13.4	4.5	17.9	8.7	1.8
2009	Western Bulldogs	2	16	10	15	186	85	271	128	20	0.6	0.9	11.6	5.3	16.9	8.0	1.3
2010	Western Bulldogs	2	21	8	7	281	122	403	135	22	0.4	0.3	13.4	5.8	19.2	6.4	1.0
2011	Western Bulldogs	2	21	6	4	306	128	434	77	36	0.3	0.2	14.6	6.1	20.7	3.7	1.7
2012	Western Bulldogs	2	21	2	0	295	125	420	78	33	0.1	0.0	14.0	6.0	20.0	3.7	1.6
2013	Western Bulldogs	2	19	13	7	296	122	418	88	43	0.7	0.4	15.6	6.4	22.0	4.6	2.3
2014	Western Bulldogs	2	22	4	5	294	158	452	91	39	0.2	0.2	13.4	7.2	20.5	4.1	1.8
2015	Western Bulldogs	2	21	2	2	324	147	471	96	32	0.1	0.1	15.4	7.0	22.4	4.6	1.5
2016	Western Bulldogs	2	3	0	1	55	29	84	19	6	0.0	0.3	18.3	9.7	28.0	6.3	2.0
2017	Western Bulldogs	2	17	10	7	208	128	336	84	36	0.6	0.4	12.2	7.5	19.8	4.9	2.1
Career			312	183	127	3940	1627	5567	1682	484	0.6	0.4	12.6	5.2	17.8	5.4	1.6
