= Western Bulldogs =

Australian rules football club

Names
- Full name: Footscray Football Club Limited, trading as Western Bulldogs (Note: "Footscray Football Club Limited" is the name of the parent company according to the club's ABN which also includes businesses such as hotels and a travel agency. The official name of the AFL team has been the "Western Bulldogs" since 1997. The VFL reserves team is called Footscray. From 1997–2020 the back of the club's AFL guernseys bore the initials "FFC". Since 2021 the "FFC" initials have been placed on the front of the guernsey. On select occasions, such as the 100th year in the VFL/AFL anniversary match in 2025, the club has reverted to the name Footscray.)
- Former name(s): Footscray Football Club (1877–1879, 1882–1996); Prince Imperial Football Club (1880–1881); Western Bulldogs (1997–present)
- Nickname(s): Bulldogs, Dogs, Doggies, Bullies, The ‘Scray, Footscray, Tricolours

2026 season
- After finals: 7th
- Home-and-away season: 8th
- Leading goalkicker: Aaron Naughton (51 goals)

Club details
- Founded: 1877; 149 years ago
- Colours: Royal blue Red White
- Competition: AFL: Senior men AFLW: Senior women VFL: Reserves men VFLW: Reserves women
- President: Kylie Watson-Wheeler
- CEO: Ameet Bains
- Coach: AFL: Luke Beveridge; AFLW: Tamara Hyett; VFL: Alex Johnson; VFLW: Rhys Sullivan
- Captain(s): AFL: Marcus Bontempelli; AFLW: Deanna Berry; VFL: Daniel Orgill; VFLW: Riley Christgoergl
- Premierships: VFL/AFL (2): 1954; 2016; Reserves/VFL (9): 1936; 1945; 1962; 1988; 1994; 1998; 2014; 2016; 2025; VFA (9): 1898; 1899; 1900; 1908; 1913; 1919; 1920; 1923; 1924; AFLW (1): 2018
- Ground: AFL: Marvel Stadium (56,347) & Eureka Stadium (11,000); AFLW/VFL/VFLW: Mission Whitten Oval (10,000)
- Training ground: Mission Whitten Oval

Uniforms
Home	Away	Alternate

Other information
- Official website: westernbulldogs.com.au

The Western Bulldogs are a professional Australian rules football club based in the Melbourne suburb of Footscray. The club competes in the Australian Football League (AFL), the sport's premier competition.

Originally named the Footscray Football Club, the club cites a foundation year of 1877, and it adopted the name of the local borough. The club won nine premierships in the Victorian Football Association (VFA) before gaining admission to the Victorian Football League (which became the AFL in 1990) in 1925. The club has won two VFL/AFL premierships, in 1954 and 2016 and was runner-up in 1961 and 2021.

The club has developed a strong support base to the west of the city, traditionally a working-class area. Docklands Stadium, in the city's inner-west, has served as the club's home ground since 2000, while its headquarters and training facilities are at its traditional home ground, the Whitten Oval. The club also plays home games at Mars Stadium in the city of Ballarat west of Melbourne. The Western Bulldogs guernsey features two thick horizontal hoops—one red and one white—on a royal blue background. Fourteen players from the club are members of the Australian Football Hall of Fame, including inaugural inductee and Legend Ted Whitten. Marcus Bontempelli and Luke Beveridge serve as the club's current captain and head coach respectively.

At the end of 1996, as part of a broader rebranding scheme, the club changed its name from Footscray to Western Bulldogs. The club has fielded a side in AFL Women's since the competition's 2017 inception, winning a premiership in 2018, and also has a reserves side in the Victorian Football League and VFL Women's League.

== History ==
=== 1877–1880s: Origins ===
Newspapers record Australian rules football being played in the Melbourne suburb of Footscray in the mid-1870s, with several teams playing in and being called Footscray. The area's main football ground was located between Napier, Bunbury and Hyde Streets in Lower Footscray. A stronger club named Footscray emerged in the area during the late 1870s. However, there are few historical records and no records of its formation. No definitive documented connection has been established between the early clubs and the modern club. As such some club historians believe this club was established in 1876 though the official date is cited as 1877. Both dates of formation have been challenged by historians. Early matches were not played against any of the large Melbourne clubs and Footscray was thus classified as a "junior" club, playing mostly against teams from nearby Williamstown.

=== 1880s–1924: VFA years and Championship of Victoria ===
Club administration also consolidated in the 1890s: industrialist and civic leader James Cuming was elected Footscray's first president in 1895 and remained in office until his death in 1911, overseeing the club's early growth in the VFA era.

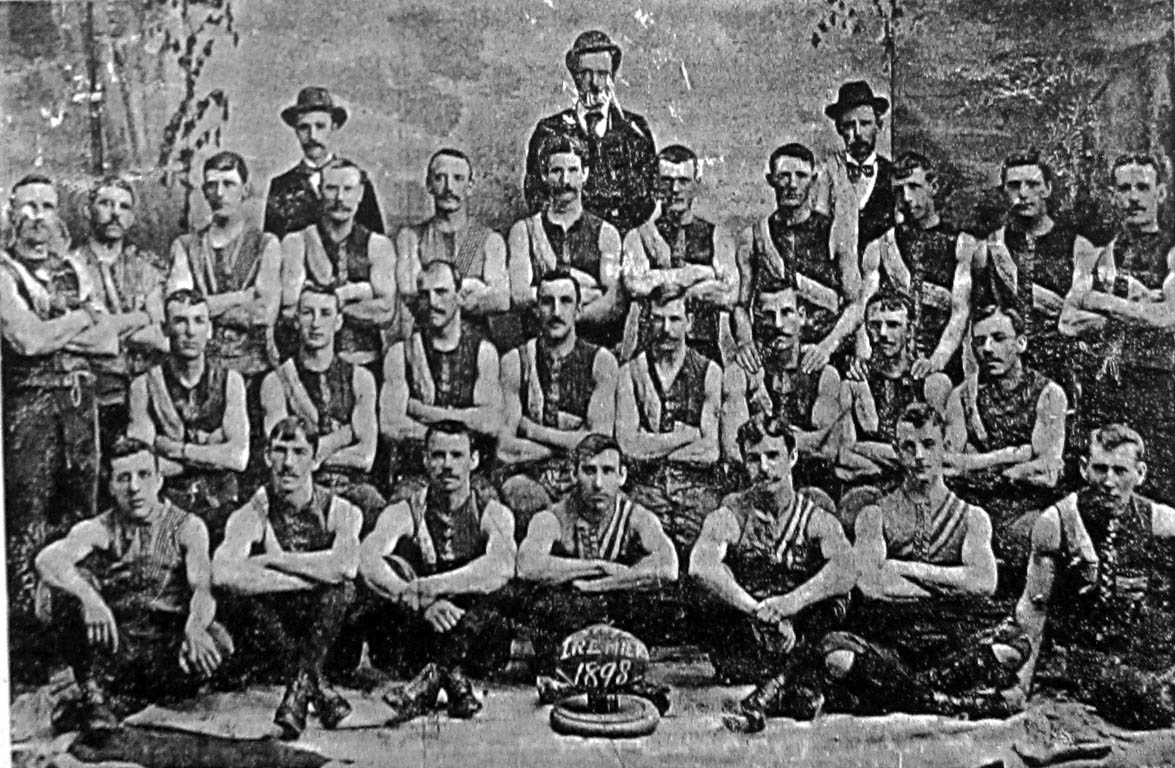
The team that won Footscray's first premiership in 1898

Initially the club played at the Northern Reserve, also known as the Market Reserve located between Barkly Street and Geelong Road. In 1880, the club changed its name to the Prince Imperials in honour of Napoléon, Prince Imperial, the heir to French throne, who had recently died in battle. The club was initially based in a park in Lower Footscray. The name change coincided with a lack of support and players, with a meeting to discuss the future of the club held in June 1881. The members present voted to continue the club, although player availability continued to be an issue, with club chairman Charlie Lovett claiming in his memoirs that the name had left many not knowing that they were a club from Footscray. The club would revert to Footscray in April 1882, adopting the name of the local borough during the annual general meeting. The club began using the Western Oval and in 1886 was granted permanent use of the Western Oval by the City of Footscray. Footscray gained admission to the Victorian Football Association (VFA) after amalgamating with the Footscray Cricket Club to form a senior football club. The club tended to struggle over the next decade, occupying the lower rungs of the VFA ladder.

The club began to improve after the VFL breakaway of 1896, finishing on top of the VFA ladder in 1898, 1899 and 1900. As no finals were played, Footscray were declared premiers. The club played in and won its first finals match in 1903, against Richmond, the minor premiers, but lost the follow-up finals match to North Melbourne. After losing to West Melbourne in the 1906 VFA Grand Final, the club won its first premiership by defeating Brunswick in 1908. Another premiership followed in 1913.

1924 Championship of Victoria	G	B	Total
Footscray	9	10	64
Essendon	4	12	36
Venue: Melbourne Cricket Ground	Crowd: 46,100

The club entered two years of recess during World War I and returned in 1918. Still rebuilding, the club won the wooden spoon. From bottom to top in one year, 1919 saw the club win the premiership, and again in 1920. The club went back-to-back in 1923 and 1924.

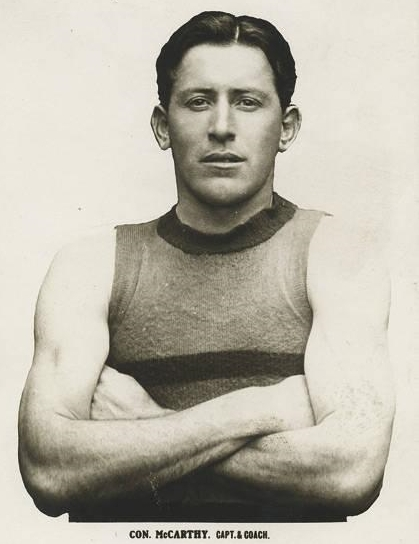
Con McCarthy captained the club to VFA premierships in 1923 and 1924, as well as a victory in the 1924 Championship of Victoria.

The 1924 premiership would be Footscray's last in the VFA. After the 1924 season, the club challenged the premiers of the VFL, Essendon, to a charity match, otherwise known as the Championship of Victoria, for the benefit of opera singer Dame Nellie Melba's Limbless Soldiers' Appeal. Footscray recorded an upset victory, winning by 28 points. The win was a significant factor in Footscray gaining admission to the VFL.

=== 1925–1940s: Joining the VFL ===
Chart of yearly ladder positions for Western Bulldogs in VFL/AFL

In 1919, there were nine clubs competing in the VFL, due to the return of all the foundation teams plus Richmond after World War I, as well as University Football Club deciding not to rejoin the VFL. This caused one team to be idle every Saturday and the VFL was keen to do away with this bye each week. On the night of 9 January 1925, a committee meeting of the VFL, chaired by Reg Hunt of Carlton, decided to expand the league from nine clubs to twelve. It was decided in the meeting to admit Footscray, along with two other VFA clubs, Hawthorn and North Melbourne.

Footscray played their first VFL match against Fitzroy on Saturday 2 May at the Brunswick Street Oval in front of 28,000 spectators. Former Richmond star George Bayliss had the honour of kicking Footscray's first VFL goal, and although they ended up losing by nine points against an experienced league side, they earned great respect. Future Brownlow medallist Allan Hopkins was regarded as Footscray's best player that day. The following week, playing their first VFL home game at the Western Oval against a strong South Melbourne team, the Tricolours recorded their first VFL victory by 10 points in front of 25,000 spectators with a strong team effort.

Footscray adapted relatively quickly to the standard of VFL football despite losing some of their VFA stars, and by 1928 were already a contender for the finals, missing only on percentage in 1931. Though they slipped to eleventh place in 1930, 1935 and 1937, in 1938 they became the first of the new clubs to reach the finals. They fell back drastically in 1939, but played better during the war-torn 1940s, winning their first nine games in 1946.

=== 1950–1954: First VFL flag ===
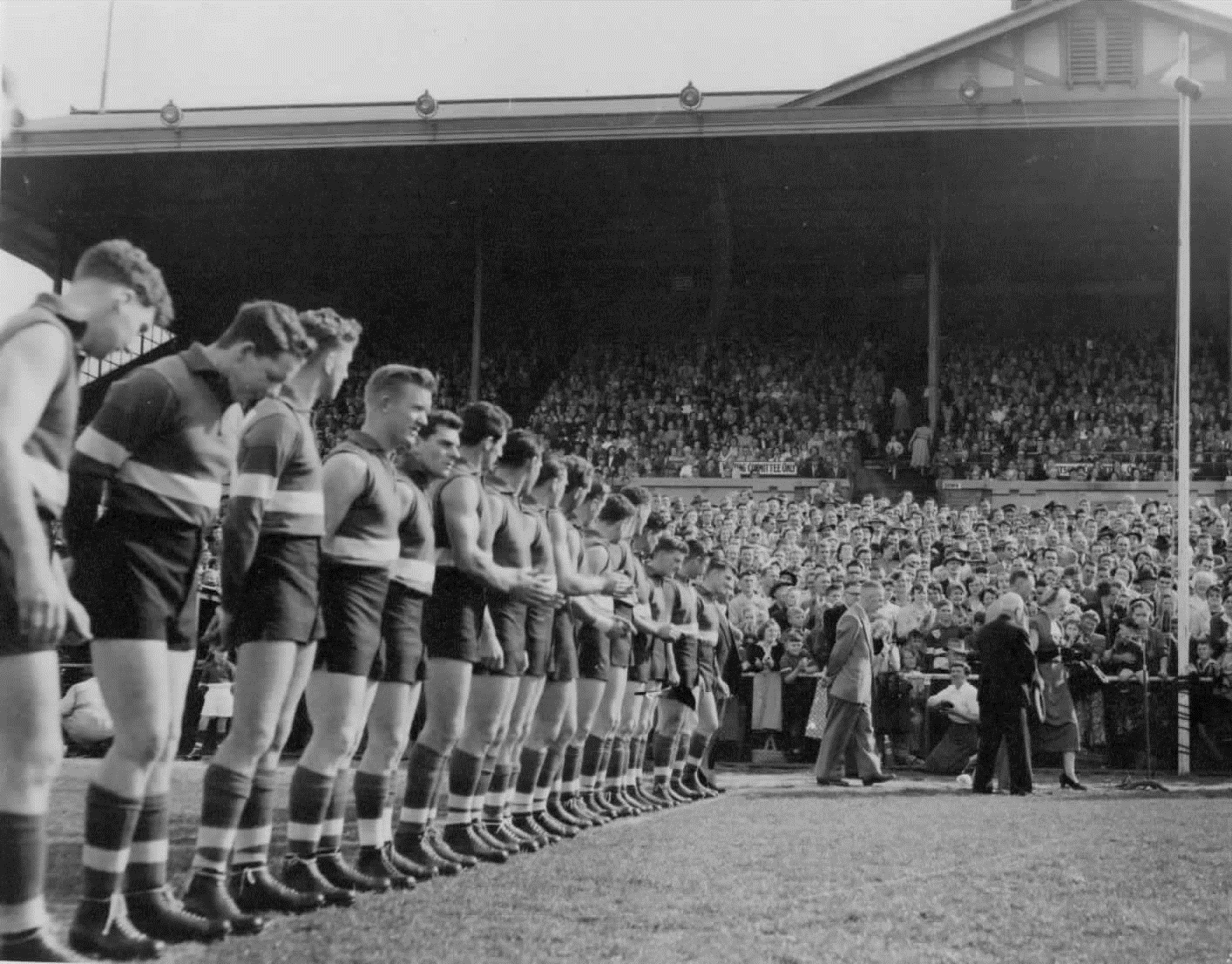
Footscray players line up for the unfurling of the 1954 VFL Grand Final premiership flag

Between 1938 and 1951, Footscray failed to win any finals matches, losing all six of its semi-final appearances. In 1953, however, the club set a record by conceding only 959 points in the home-and-away season due to a powerful defence featuring Dave Bryden, Wally Donald, Herb Henderson and Jim Gallagher. Footscray finally won its first semi-final, against Essendon, but lost the preliminary final to Geelong, a key factor being the absence of star full-forward Jack Collins, who had been suspended for four matches at the end of the home-and-away season.

The Bulldogs went into the 1954 VFL season as premiership contenders. However, the season did not start well with losses St Kilda and Richmond, both of which finished in the bottom four the previous season. In the following two matches, against South Melbourne and Carlton, the club returned to form with Jack Collins booting eight and nine goals respectively to help propel the Bulldogs to victory. In Round 7 against Hawthorn at Glenferrie Oval, Footscray, led by Don Ross after Whitten injured his shoulder, came from 23 points down at the last break to kick seven goals and win by nine points. With Richmond upsetting Collingwood at Victoria Park that same day, the Bulldogs went to the top of the ladder, where they would stay until Round 11, when they lost to Collingwood by ten points in a top-of-the-ladder clash at Victoria Park. Took out their first VFL premiership, beating Geelong and then Melbourne in the 1954 VFL Grand Final.

1954 VFL Grand Final	G	B	Total
Footscray	15	12	102
Melbourne	7	9	51
Venue: Melbourne Cricket Ground	Crowd: 80,897

=== 1955–1960s: Gradual decline ===
Footscray failed to capitalise on their premiership success, falling off in the latter part of the decade and finishing with their first wooden spoon in 1959.

The 1960s started promisingly, with the club bouncing back to reach the 1961 Grand Final, where they faced Hawthorn who were in their first Grand Final. This was the first VFL Grand Final not to feature any of the foundation teams. In front of over 107,000 spectators, the Bulldogs worked their way to an eight-point lead at half-time, but were clearly struggling with the physicality of their hardened opponents. Rover Merv Hobbs recalled eight players needing first aid, while ruckman John Schultz remembered: The selectors looked around and could see we were in a bad way. In those days, strange to realise, we didn't hydrate. We were told not to drink too much in case we got cramps. We just ran out of legs. And Hawthorn were brutal. They made every contest a physical clash. They wore us down. In the second half, the Hawks, led by centreman Brendan Edwards, pulled away from the tiring Bulldogs, kicking ten goals to two to take out their first VFL premiership. This was followed by winning the 1963 and 1964 night premierships, although this success was not transferred into the season proper. The rest of the decade was a bleak era for the club, particularly between 1965 and 1969, when they finished in the bottom three every year.

=== 1970s ===
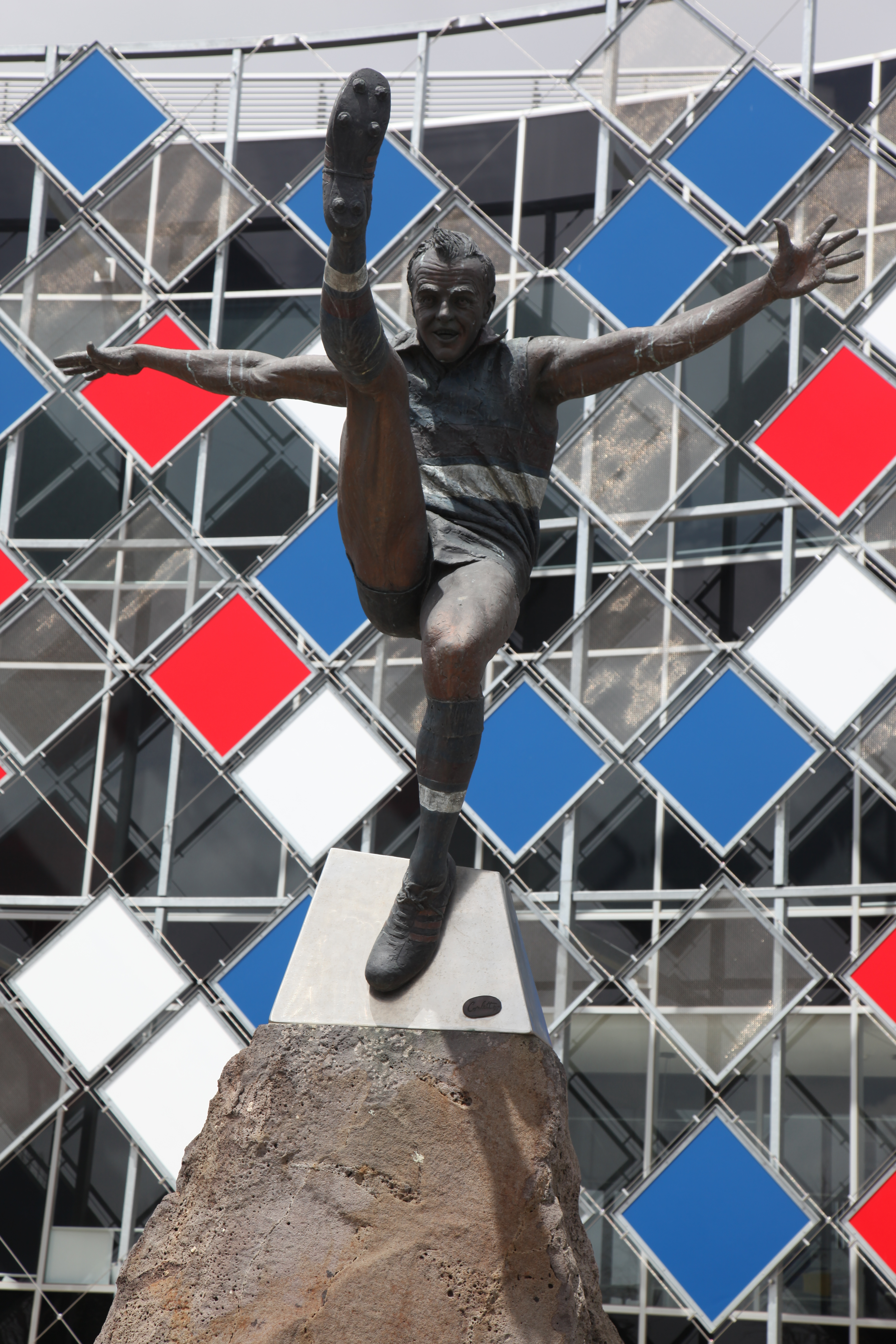
Footscray legend E. J. Whitten played his 321st and final game in 1970 to become the VFL games record holder. (Pictured: Statue of Whitten outside Whitten Oval.)

Ted Whitten Snr. retired as a player in 1970 and held the record for the most VFL games played at the time (321 games); he would continue in a coaching capacity until the end of 1971. The club was relatively strong in the 1970s, but did not win a final; by decade's end they were back near the bottom.

The main stars of the decade included Gary Dempsey, the heroic ruckman who was badly burnt in Lara bushfire of January 1969 but managed to take out the game's top individual award, the Brownlow Medal, in 1975. Promising South Australian import Neil Sachse had his neck broken in a freak accident while playing against Fitzroy at the Western Oval. He was left quadriplegic. In 1978, Kelvin Templeton became the first Bulldogs player to kick 100 goals in a season, including a club record of 15.9 in Round 13 against St Kilda.

=== 1980s ===
After muddling its way through a disappointing decade, having to sell many of its key players to survive, the Bulldogs would endure another tumultuous decade in the 1980s. To try and improve the club's fortunes, the committee appointed former Richmond champion Royce Hart as coach for the 1980 VFL season. Things hit an all-time low in 1982; the Bulldogs lost their opening round match to Essendon by 109 points and by the middle of the season, with only one win in 12 games and having lost the last eight matches, Hart was sacked and replaced with player Ian Hampshire, who promptly quit his playing duties. One of the few bright spots in an otherwise dreary season was the performance of Western Australian recruit Simon Beasley, who kicked 82 goals for the season and proved himself one of the best full-forwards in the competition. He would go on to become the Bulldogs' record goalkicker.

Mick Malthouse was appointed senior coach in 1984, and a dramatic improvement saw them rise to second position in 1985 before a ten-point loss in the preliminary finals against Hawthorn. The club boasted a list of top players at this time, with Beasley, Doug Hawkins, Brian Royal, Rick Kennedy, Stephen Wallis, Peter Foster, Michael McLean, Jim Edmond, Andrew Purser, Stephen MacPherson and Brad Hardie.

The debt ridden club in 1986 was considered by the VFL extremely likely to fold if not for the lifeline provided by the VFL granting licenses to Brisbane and Perth.

Things did not bode well for the Bulldogs early in the 1987 VFL season. Hardie and Edmond had moved to the newly formed Brisbane Bears, while Hawkins' return from his knee injury was still some time away. By Round 3 they were sitting on the bottom of the ladder after heavy losses to Essendon, Sydney and Carlton. Footscray's revival started when, in one of the upsets of the season, they defeated the reigning premiers Hawthorn by 41 points in a display characterised by teamwork and desperation. A seven-match winning streak mid-season saw them back in the Top Five. However, they just missed out on the finals when Melbourne defeated them in the last round in front of a record crowd at their home ground.

==== 1989: Proposed merger and fightback ====
Discontent between players, officials and fans reached an all-time low during the 1989 VFL season. Club president Barrie Beattie was replaced by former Footscray board member, businessman and prominent racing personality Nick Columb in March. Things started promisingly with a 59-point win over a dispirited Carlton at Princes Park, with Subiaco recruit John Georgiades kicking eight goals on debut. However, it proved to be a false dawn; the Bulldogs would only win five more games for the season, with one draw, to finish 13th. The prevailing mood was best captured in Footscray's last win of the season in Round 20 against eventual wooden-spooners Richmond; although the Bulldogs won by 78 points, a meagre crowd of 8,673 turned up to what many believed at the time would be Footscray's last home game at the Western Oval. Age journalist Garry Linnell wrote: "But saddest of all is that the suburb of Footscray has turned its back on the Western Oval and its football team. Without that support, one of the last remaining monuments to the days when Victorian football was a battle of suburban tribes has hit the dust."

Faced with the prospect of running a club with declining membership and sponsorship, Columb learned that Footscray's debt situation was poor, and it reached the point when the VFL looked likely to appoint an administrator to wind up the club's affairs at the end of the year. He decided the best way forward was a merger with Fitzroy, which was also in a weak financial position, although was not facing immediate bankruptcy. The two clubs announced a merger to form the Fitzroy Bulldogs, but the merger was derailed when the people of Footscray, led by lawyer Peter Gordon and a host of others, rallied to raise funds to pay off the club's debts. In further developments, former club player Terry Wheeler was named as Malthouse's replacement as senior coach, while champion veteran wingman Doug Hawkins was appointed captain. While Columb was branded by some as the villain of the story, the wisdom of hindsight shows that had he not instigated the merger, the Western Bulldogs would not exist as it does today.

=== 1990s ===
The Bulldogs began the new decade in promising fashion, finishing in seventh place with twelve wins in 1990, including one against eventual premiers Collingwood, when rover Steven Kolyniuk ran around the man on the mark and kicked a goal to put his team in front. Although they just missed out on the finals, there was much to look forward to, and the year was capped off with diminutive rover Tony Liberatore winning the Brownlow Medal.

After an unsuccessful 1991, the Bulldogs bounced back in 1992, finishing second on the ladder and making their first finals appearance since 1985. Danny Del-Re was an excellent full-forward, while champion veterans Hawkins, Royal, Wallis, Foster and MacPherson helped ensure the club played its best football in many years. Scott Wynd capped a excellent year with the Brownlow Medal, while Chris Grant and Simon Atkins also had outstanding seasons.

In 1994 and 1995, the Bulldogs again made the finals, only to be eliminated by Melbourne and Geelong, respectively. Leon Cameron and Daniel Southern were stars. In August, Ted Whitten died from prostate cancer; such was his status in the game that he was given a state funeral. In his honour, the club renamed the Western Oval the Whitten Oval, and a memorial statue of Whitten was erected outside the stadium.

Under the tightly focused management of club president David Smorgon, driven coaching by Terry Wallace, and the on-field leadership of Chris Grant (who narrowly missed a Brownlow Medal in 1996 and 1997) and Tony Liberatore, the club had a successful period through the mid- to late 1990s, making the finals from 1997 to 2000. The 1997 season is remembered for the club's cruellest loss, to eventual premiers Adelaide in the preliminary final by two points after leading for much of the game and appearing to be headed for their first grand final since 1961. Rohan Smith, Brad Johnson, Chris Grant, Jose Romero, Paul Hudson and company were catalysts in a fine season.

The Bulldogs would again feature in the finals in 1998, after heavily defeating West Coast in the qualifying finals, they met Adelaide again in the losing preliminary final. The Bulldogs eventfully lost by 68 points against the reigning premiers who went on to claim their second consecutive premiership in the grand final that following week.

The Bulldogs would make their third consecutive top 4 finish in 1999 but they suffered consecutive finals losses to West Coast and Brisbane.

In late 1996, the club changed its playing name from Footscray to the Western Bulldogs to market the club more broadly (specifically the western suburbs of Melbourne). To coincide with the change, the club moved their home games from the Whitten Oval, originally to Optus Oval from 1997 to 1999, and then to the newly built Docklands Stadium for the 2000 season.

=== 2000s ===
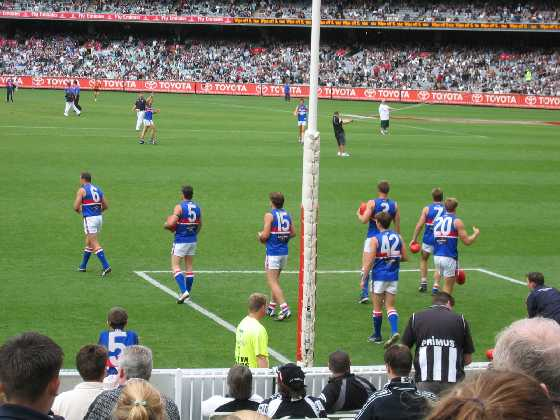
Western Bulldogs players during warm-up against Collingwood in 2004

During the 2000 season, the Bulldogs handed the eventual premiers, Essendon, their only loss for the year. That victory secured the Bulldogs a place in the finals for the fourth consecutive year. They would bow out in the first week of finals after being defeated by the Brisbane Lions at the Gabba. The Bulldogs missed out on the finals over the next two seasons; in 2001, six players were in New York City during the September 11 attacks while they were attending the 2001 US Open. Terry Wallace left the club with one match left in 2002 and assistant coach Peter Rohde took charge. Philanthropist and long-time Bulldogs supporter Susan Alberti was elected to the club board in December 2004. After two miserable seasons, the Bulldogs appointed Rodney Eade as coach in 2005. Improvement was immediate, with the Bulldogs winning 11 games and finishing ninth on the ladder in 2005, missing out on the finals by just half a game. Missing the finals dealt a blow to both players and supporters of the team, as late season success led to the team being considered real premiership contenders.

In 2006, the Bulldogs continued to play well despite a disastrous run of injuries throughout the year; with five players having to have knee reconstructions, including captain Luke Darcy. Despite this setback, the Bulldogs finished the home-and-away season with 13 wins (see 2006 AFL season), making it to the finals for the first time since 2000, with Scott West and Brad Johnson continuing their excellent play. They won the Elimination Final against Collingwood in front of 84,000 at the Melbourne Cricket Ground (MCG) and reached the semi-finals before being defeated by eventual Premiers the West Coast Eagles at Subiaco Oval.

On 5 August 2006, Chris Grant broke the Western Bulldogs record for the most senior AFL/VFL games at the club. On this day he played his 330th game, breaking Doug Hawkins' previous record of 329 games.

Looking for new markets, the club had played one game every year at the Sydney Cricket Ground and one "home" game each year at Marrara Oval in Darwin. On 16 August 2006, the league announced that the Bulldogs' Sydney "home" game would be played at Manuka Oval, Canberra in 2007, 2008 and 2009.

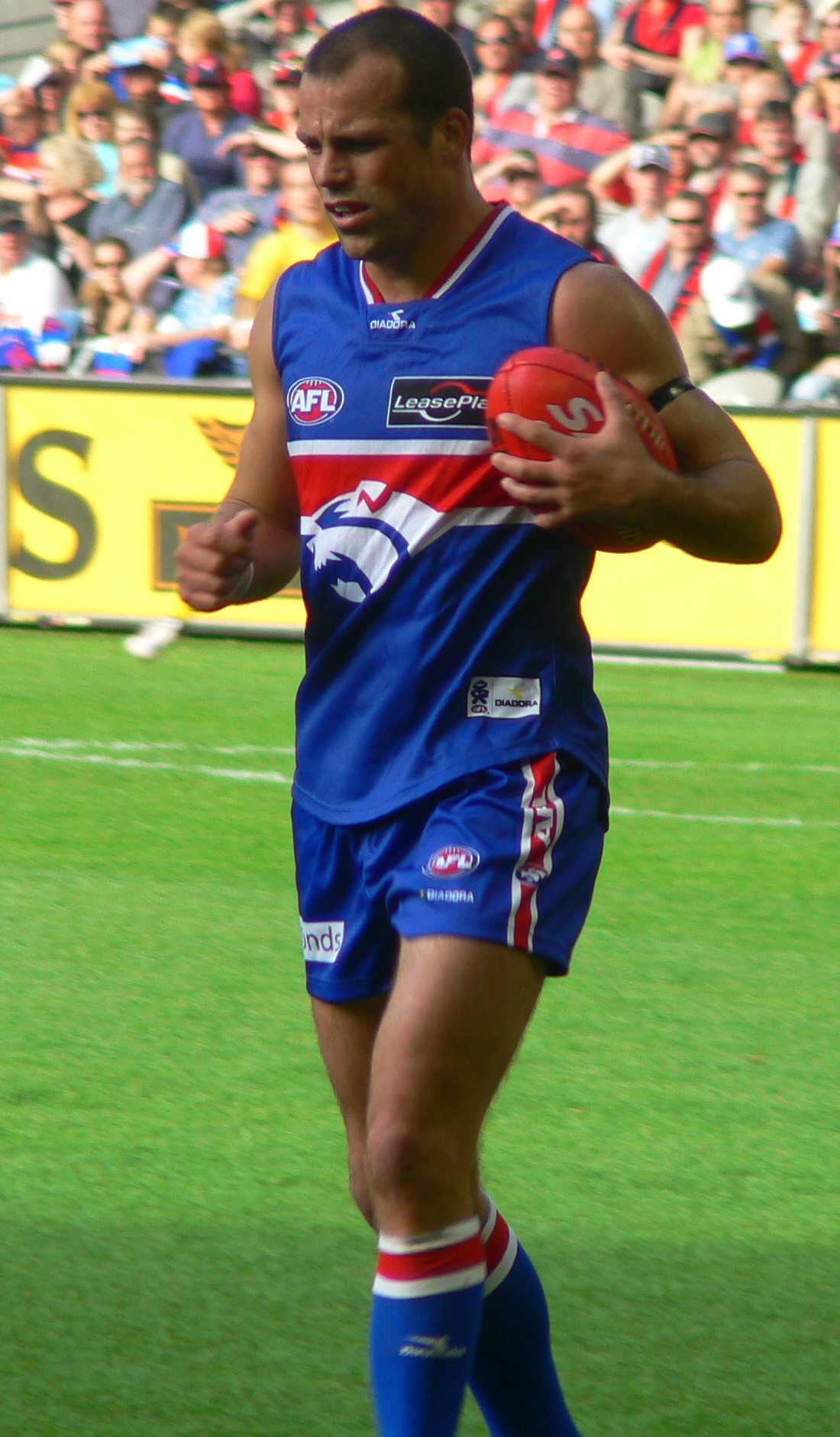
Brad Johnson was the club's captain from 2007 to 2010.

Prior to the 2007 season, the Bulldogs made a splash by trading for Brisbane midfielder Jason Akermanis. They were premiership favourites early on in 2007, but yet again injuries took their toll, and they faltered in the last seven rounds, losing six games and drawing one, to finish 13th.

In the 2008 pre-season they traded away Jordan McMahon to Richmond and Sam Power to North Melbourne. They also recruited ruckman Ben Hudson and forward Scott Welsh from Adelaide and back Tim Callan from Geelong in what was a very successful trade week. In 2008, the Bulldogs were widely predicted for the bottom four after the pre-season, but had a successful home-and-away season, finishing in third place with fifteen wins, one draw and six losses (five of which occurred in the season's last seven games). The team's finals campaign began with a loss to Hawthorn by 51 points at the MCG in the first qualifying final, but won the subsequent semi-final against Sydney by 37 points. The Bulldogs lost their preliminary final match against reigning premiers Geelong.

Much was expected of the Bulldogs following their 3rd-place finish in 2008. They began the 2009 season with a 63-point thrashing of Fremantle in Perth, and then recorded solid wins over North Melbourne and Richmond before losing their next three games to West Coast (in Perth), Carlton and St Kilda. The Bulldogs then notched up their first away win against Adelaide since 2001, kicking eight goals to one in the third quarter to win by 32 points. The following week, they survived a determined effort from Melbourne, winning by 7 points, before succumbing to Geelong in one of the best and closest games of the season. They proceeded to win their next five games, including a 93-point drubbing of Port Adelaide in Darwin and an 88-point win over the reigning premiers Hawthorn. After a bit of a dip in form including losses to Collingwood, St Kilda and West Coast, the Bulldogs rebounded with an 18-point win against Brisbane at The Gabba. That was followed up by a 14-point win over Geelong. In the final round of the home-and-away season, the Bulldogs needed to defeat Collingwood by more than 22 points to reclaim third place on the ladder. The Bulldogs managed win by 24 points, earning the right to play Geelong in the first week of the finals.

=== 2010s ===
There was media expectation that the Western Bulldogs would again feature in the top four in 2010 after doing so in 2008 and 2009. The pre-season delivered the Western Bulldogs their first competition victory since 1970 as they defeated St Kilda by 40 points in the NAB Cup Grand Final, with new recruit Barry Hall starring with seven goals and winning the Michael Tuck Medal for being the best player. However, after a promising pre-season, the Bulldogs failed to make their first grand final in 49 years after being demolished by Collingwood in the first round of the finals, coming back against the Sydney Swans and losing again to St Kilda in the preliminary final, captain Brad Johnson's last game.

The pain of three consecutive Preliminary final exits took its toll in 2011. After a 55-point thrashing at the hands of Essendon in the opening round, the season never looked on track. The Bulldogs lost 9 of their first 12 games, including 7 from 8 games between Rounds 5 and 12. Following a 49-point loss to Essendon in Round 21, coach Rodney Eade was sacked by the Western Bulldogs after seven years at the helm. The club finished the year with wins against Port Adelaide and Fremantle and a loss against Hawthorn. The Bulldogs finished 2011 with a 9-win, 13-loss record for the season. Shortly after the 2011 season was completed, long-time Geelong and Essendon assistant Brendan McCartney was appointed as the senior coach on a three-year contract. During the following months, the Bulldogs assembled a coaching panel consisting of senior coach McCartney, former Geelong and St Kilda ruckman Steven King, former Sydney Swans and North Melbourne midfielder Shannon Grant, former Bulldogs champion and 300 game player Rohan Smith, and former Bulldogs and Port Adelaide player Brett Montgomery.

In October 2012, long-time president David Smorgon stepped down from the role to be replaced by former president Peter Gordon. Smorgon served as president from 1996 to 2012, overseeing two rebuilding phases, the erasure of much debt and a period of stability after decades of uncertainty surrounding the club's future.

In 2013, the Bulldogs ended their affiliation with Williamstown Football Club, establishing a reserves team in the Victorian Football League for the 2014 season. The team played under the name of Footscray and the decision proved an instant hit on and off the field, with supporters of the AFL club taking a strong liking to the newly established VFL team. The success flowed onto the field as well, with the club securing the VFL Premiership in its first season in the competition since 1924, defeating the Box Hill Hawks by 22 points in the VFL Grand Final.

=== Luke Beveridge era (2015–present) ===
Following a disappointing 2014 AFL season, the Bulldogs endured a tumultuous off-season. It began when Ryan Griffen, who was widely regarded as the club's best player and had only been captain for one season, shocked the football world by requesting a trade to Greater Western Sydney. He later cited the stress of captaincy as his reason for nearly giving up the game altogether. Two days later, senior coach McCartney handed in his resignation to the board. President Gordon agreed that the decision was in the best interests of the club and also stressed to the press that the club was not in crisis. Adam Cooney requested a trade out of the club, and Shaun Higgins joined North Melbourne via free agency. On November 14, the club's coach selection panel, headed by club champion and football director Chris Grant and including CEO Simon Garlick, football manager Graham Lowe, former captain Luke Darcy and former West Coast coach John Worsfold, appointed former player Luke Beveridge as the Bulldogs' new senior coach. Beveridge had recently served as an assistant coach at Collingwood and Hawthorn, and was due to take up a position at St Kilda as director of coaching before applying for the job as Bulldogs coach. In a series of important first steps, he decided to keep the existing coaches and appointed veteran Bob Murphy as captain.

In January 2015, Simon Garlick announced his resignation as club CEO, having first taken on the position in December 2010. Having been at the Bulldogs for more than 13 years as a player and administrator, Garlick felt the time was right to "start a new chapter in his life". President Gordon paid tribute to Garlick for his work in keeping the Bulldogs competitive during what had been a difficult period for the club. After losing over 700 games of experience during the off-season, the Bulldogs were expected to again struggle in 2015, and those feelings were further strengthened when Tom Liberatore, the reigning Charles Sutton Medallist, went down with a rupture to his anterior cruciate ligament in the NAB Challenge match against Richmond. However, the Bulldogs exceeded expectations to finish the home-and-away season in sixth position to feature in the finals for the first time since 2010. In the elimination final, they lost to Adelaide by 7 points in front of over 60,000 fans at the MCG, the largest crowd at any Bulldogs game since the 2010 finals.

==== 2016: AFL premiership ====
2016 AFL Grand Final	G	B	Total
Western Bulldogs	13	11	89
Sydney	10	7	67
Venue: Melbourne Cricket Ground	Crowd: 99,981

The Bulldogs fought through numerous injuries in 2016 to finish 7th in the home and away season. In a series of against-the-odds finals victories, the club eliminated the previous year's runners-up, the West Coast Eagles, in Perth; thwarted Hawthorn's bid for a fourth successive premiership; and, away from home, scraped through against Greater Western Sydney to qualify for the Grand Final for the first time in 55 years. In doing so, it became the first club to reach the premiership decider from such a low position on the ladder.

The club ended a 62-year premiership drought with a 22-point victory over minor premiers the Sydney Swans. Jason Johannisen won the Norm Smith Medal, with Liam Picken (WB), Tom Boyd (WB) and Josh Kennedy (SYD) close behind, while coach Luke Beveridge gave his Jock McHale Medal to captain and club veteran Bob Murphy—who suffered a season-ending knee injury in round 3—saying, "This is yours, mate. You deserve it more than anyone." This gesture, described as "one of the most touching" in football history, was met with a standing ovation by the crowd. Murphy, though thankful, returned the medal to Beveridge the following day, saying he could not keep it. They decided to gift the medal to the Bulldogs museum.

==== 2017–2018: Post-premiership disappointment ====
Despite a promising start to the 2017 AFL season, which saw the reigning premiers win five of their first seven matches, the Bulldogs lost six of the next eight games. A four-game winning streak towards the end of the season proved to be a false dawn, as the Bulldogs failed to secure a spot in the top eight after losing the last three games of the season. They finished tenth with an 11–11 win–loss record, becoming the first team since Hawthorn in 2009 to miss the finals the year after winning the premiership. The club would farewell two long-serving veterans: the retiring captain Murphy and ex-captain Matthew Boyd.

2018 proved to be an even more difficult year for the club. Tom Liberatore suffered a second season-ending knee injury in the opening round 82-point loss to Greater Western Sydney; he would be the first of eight Bulldogs to have their season ended by injury. They suffered six heavy losses in the first half of the season and would win only once between Round 9 and Round 19, with the sole win in that period a thrilling two-point upset win over finalists Geelong in Round 15. Injuries aside, there were also issues with inconsistent form – players such as premiership heroes Jordan Roughead, Caleb Daniel, Shane Biggs and Fletcher Roberts spending time in the VFL – and a forward set-up that was struggling to function effectively.
Improved form in the final four rounds of the season saw the Bulldogs win three consecutive games and lose gallantly to reigning premiers Richmond, to finish 13th with an 8–14 win–loss record, becoming the first team since Adelaide in 2000 to miss the finals in successive years after a premiership triumph.

==== 2019–2022: Return to the finals ====
Defying expectations that they would again miss the finals, the Bulldogs were one of the surprise packets of the 2019 season. The season started well enough with victories in the first two games, defeating Sydney by 17 points in Round 1 and then kicking nine goals in the last quarter against Hawthorn to win by 19 points in Round 2. However, they then lost their next four matches. The Dogs would continue to have up-and-down form, winning their next two before losing four of five afterwards. Staring at a third consecutive year out of the finals with a disappointing 5–8 record at the end of Round 14, the Bulldogs would go on to win seven of their last nine matches of the season, securing a spot in the finals for the first time since the 2016 premiership after defeating Adelaide by 34 points in Round 23. They would finish the home-and-away season in seventh position with a 12–10 win–loss record. Despite having strong form heading into the finals and having defeated eventual finals opponent Greater Western Sydney by 61 points in Round 22, the Bulldogs were thrashed by 58 points in their elimination final encounter with the Giants, who would eventually go on to play in that year's grand final.

The Western Bulldogs entered the 2020 AFL season looking to improve on their strong finish to 2019. They had strengthened their squad during the off-season trading period, recruiting key position players Josh Bruce from St Kilda and Alex Keath from Adelaide. Veteran defender Easton Wood, who had been acting captain in the 2016 premiership and then served as official captain after Bob Murphy retired, stepped down at the end of 2019 and was replaced by Marcus Bontempelli in an almost unanimous player vote, with Lachlan Hunter as his deputy. Bontempelli would be supported by a leadership group which included Wood, Jason Johannisen, Mitch Wallis and Josh Dunkley.
After losing the traditional season opener to Collingwood, the season was then plunged into chaos when the COVID-19 pandemic reached Australia, causing the competition to be suspended for over two months. After significant modifications in consultation with state governments, the AFL resumed the season in mid-June, having cut the home-and-away season to 17 rounds, shortening quarter lengths to 16 minutes plus time-on, and not permitting crowd attendances at Victorian venues due to government-imposed restrictions. As state borders began to close in a bid to curb the spread of the virus, the Victorian-based teams flew out of Melbourne after Round 5 and spent the rest of the season based in interstate quarantine hubs; the Bulldogs would be based in Queensland. The Bulldogs secured their spot in the 2020 finals series after another strong finish, winning five of their last six games and ending in seventh position on the ladder with a 10–7 record. Their Elimination final opponents, sixth-placed St Kilda, also finished with the same win–loss record but a higher percentage. The match, which was hosted at the Gabba, was a close-fought affair; the Bulldogs worked their way to a five-point lead at quarter time, only for the Saints to take control in the second and third terms to lead by 24 points at the last change. In a desperate bid to keep their season alive, the Bulldogs made one last charge in the final minutes to reduce the margin to under a goal with two minutes remaining, but the Saints held on by three points, winning their first final since 2010, which had also been against the Bulldogs.
Despite another disappointing early finals exit, there was still much to celebrate in terms of individual recognition; diminutive playmaker Caleb Daniel had a career-best season, winning the Charles Sutton Medal and All-Australian honours, while Marcus Bontempelli and Jack Macrae earned their second consecutive All-Australian blazer. Also promising was the continued development of the younger players; Aaron Naughton (for the second straight year) and Bailey Smith were named in the 22 Under 22 team, while Laitham Vandermeer won the Chris Grant Best First Player award.

The Bulldogs headed into the 2021 AFL season with the aim of progressing past the first week of the finals series. They had been one of the big winners in the trading period, recruiting Mitch Hannan from Melbourne, Stefan Martin from Brisbane, and Adam Treloar from Collingwood, while managing to keep Josh Dunkley after he had requested a trade to Essendon. They had also secured promising Next Generation Academy member Jamarra Ugle-Hagan as the Number 1 pick at the 2020 AFL draft.

For much of the season, the Bulldogs had been one of the clear standout teams, winning nine of the opening ten matches and appearing on track to win their first minor premiership after defeating Melbourne in Round 19. However, an ill-timed late season slump saw the Bulldogs consigned to a third consecutive year without the double chance, finishing outside of the top four by just 0.5% after the Brisbane Lions supplanted them in the final round. Despite the disappointing end to the regular season, the Bulldogs were finally able to progress to the second week of the finals after a thumping 49-point win over Essendon in the first elimination final. The Bulldogs would then go on to progress to their first preliminary final since 2016 after an enthralling one-point win over Brisbane in the semi-final, before securing a second Grand Final appearance in six years after thrashing Port Adelaide by 71 points in the prelim. However, the Bulldogs were comprehensively outplayed by Melbourne in the grand final, losing to the Demons by 74 points.

The Bulldogs were looking to atone for their galling grand final defeat ahead of the 2022 season. However, the Dogs were very inconsistent and were fortunate to qualify for a fourth consecutive finals berth, finishing eighth with a 12–10 win-loss record and narrowly supplanting ninth-placed Carlton by 0.6%. The Bulldogs started their elimination final encounter with Fremantle strongly, leading by as much as 41 points during the second quarter, but would fade out dramatically to lose by 13 points.

=== 2023–present: Rebuilding period ===
The Western Bulldogs continued to perform inconsistently in 2023. The Bulldogs stayed in contention for the finals right throughout the season, but costly losses to cellar-dwellers Hawthorn and West Coast in the final stretch of the season eventually scuppered their hopes of a fifth consecutive finals appearance. Greater Western Sydney defeated Carlton in the final match of the home-and-away season and secured their spot in the 2023 finals series at the Bulldogs' expense. The Dogs ultimately finished ninth with a 12–11 record to miss out in September for the first time since 2018.

During the 2023 offseason, superstar midfielder Bailey Smith suffered an ACL tear at training, ruling him out for essentially the entire 2024 campaign. Smith would not play for the club again, eventually being traded to Geelong during the 2024 offseason.

The Bulldogs returned to the finals in 2024. After showing inconsistent form once again for most of the season, the Dogs entered the finals in sixth place with a 14–9 win-loss record after winning six of their last seven games. Despite expectations of a third deep September run in nine years, the Bulldogs were bounced out in the first week after losing to a resurgent Hawthorn by 37 points in the elimination final.

The Bulldogs would have yet another season on the edge in 2025. Although firmly in finals contention all year, the Dogs’ inability to match up with the best teams of the season would cost them dearly. They were desperately unlucky to finish ninth with 14 wins and nine losses, a record that would have been enough to qualify for every previous finals series in VFL/AFL history. Their percentage of 137 was also the best of any non-finalist since 1963.

The Bulldogs continued to hover around the middle of the ladder in 2026. The Dogs did enough to return to finals football, finishing eighth with a 13–9–1 record. They won the first ever wildcard final in thrilling fashion, outlasting Collingwood by three points after Magpie forward Tim Membrey’s shot for goal after the siren faltered. However, the Dogs would lose their sixth elimination final in eight attempts under Luke Beveridge, bowing out with a 22-point loss to Adelaide.

== Identity ==
=== Nickname and mascots ===
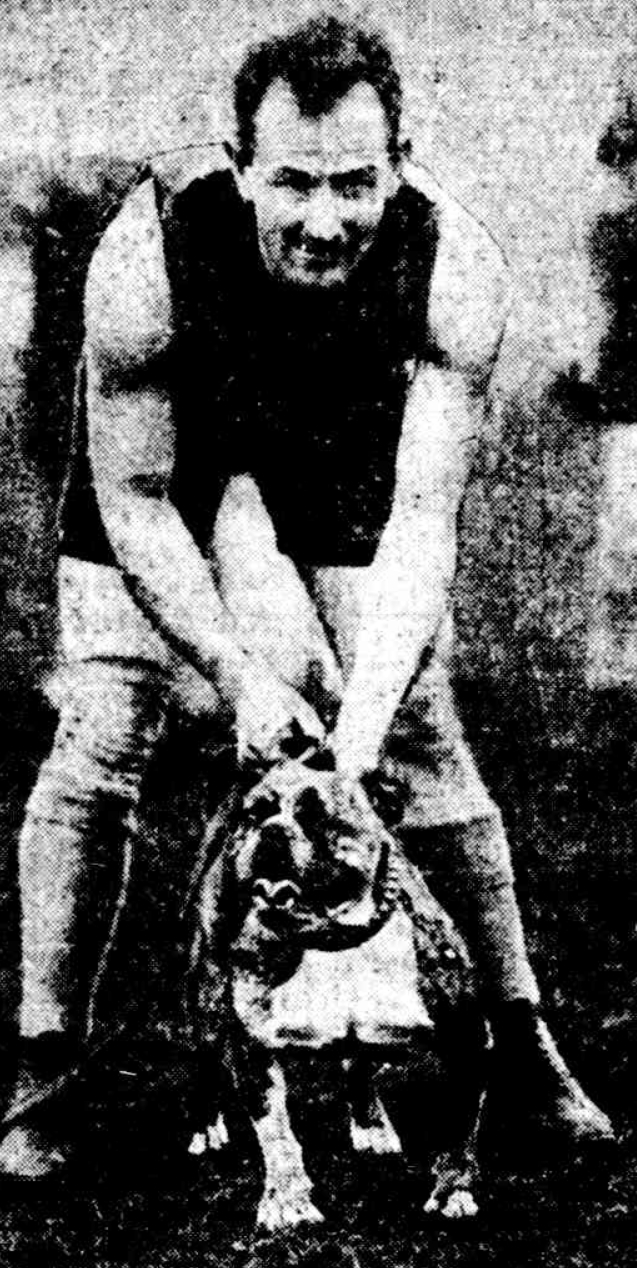
Footscray captain Paddy Scanlan with the club's first mascot, 1928

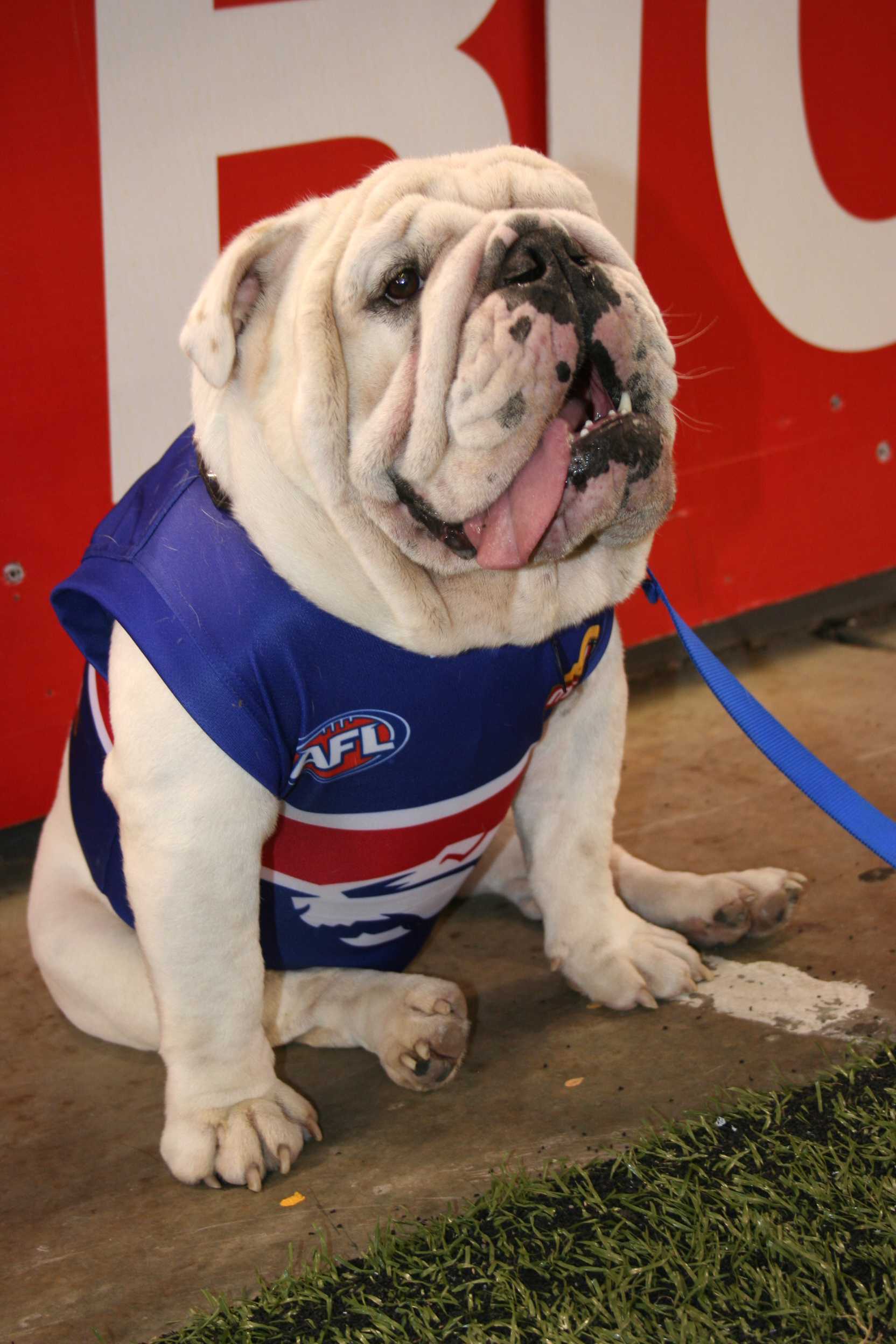
Sid served as the Western Bulldogs' mascot from 2009 to 2017.

Footscray went by a variety of nicknames during the VFA years, including the Bone Mill Fellows, the Saltwater Lads, and, most popularly, the Tricolours, in reference to the club guernsey. Footscray came to be known as the Bulldogs during the 1920s. At a club social function in 1920, a red, white and blue flag emblazoned with the phrase "bulldog tenacity" and an image of a bulldog was presented to then-president David Mitchell. The press began referring to the club as "the Bulldogs" soon after, and by the 1922 season, a bulldog emblem was being stamped on members' tickets.

In 1928, during Footscray's Round 10 match against Collingwood at the Western Oval, the club got its first mascot when a bulldog decorated in red, white and blue was led onto the ground at three-quarter time "to the wild applause of the callow youth", and was photographed with Footscray captain Paddy Scanlan. The bulldog belonged to the club's vice-president, John Nobbs.

Today, the club's real-life mascot is a bulldog named Caesar. He can be seen walking around the perimeter of the ground prior to each match. He then waits for the players to come out on the ground; they give him a pat as they run past to the banner. During home games, Caesar has a reserved area at the Footscray End (Gate 7), where fans can come and give him a pat and have their photo taken. Sid, the club's previous real-life mascot, officially retired his club jumper at Etihad Stadium on 6 May 2017 and was given a lap of honour for his seven years of service to the Western Bulldogs. Sid died in 2019 at age 9 1/2 years old.

In addition to their live mascots, the Western Bulldogs have four costumed mascots, referred to as 'The Pack': Woofer, Barkly, Butch and Roxie.

=== Song ===
Western Bulldogs' club song is sung to the tune of "Sons of the Sea". Before the club changed its name from Footscray to Western Bulldogs, the club song was called "Sons of the 'Scray", sung to the same tune but with different lyrics.

The club song for the Men's team is called "Sons of the west"

Sons of the west,
Red, white and blue,
We come out snarling,
Bulldogs through and through,
Bulldogs bite and Bulldogs roar,
We give our very best,
But you can't beat the boys of the Bulldog breed,
We're the team of the mighty West!

The club song for the Women's team is called "Daughters of the west"

Daughters of the west,
Red, white and blue,
We come out snarling,
Bulldogs through and through,
Bulldogs bite and Bulldogs roar,
We give our very best,
But you can't beat the girls of the Bulldog breed,
We're the team of the mighty West!

=== Grounds ===
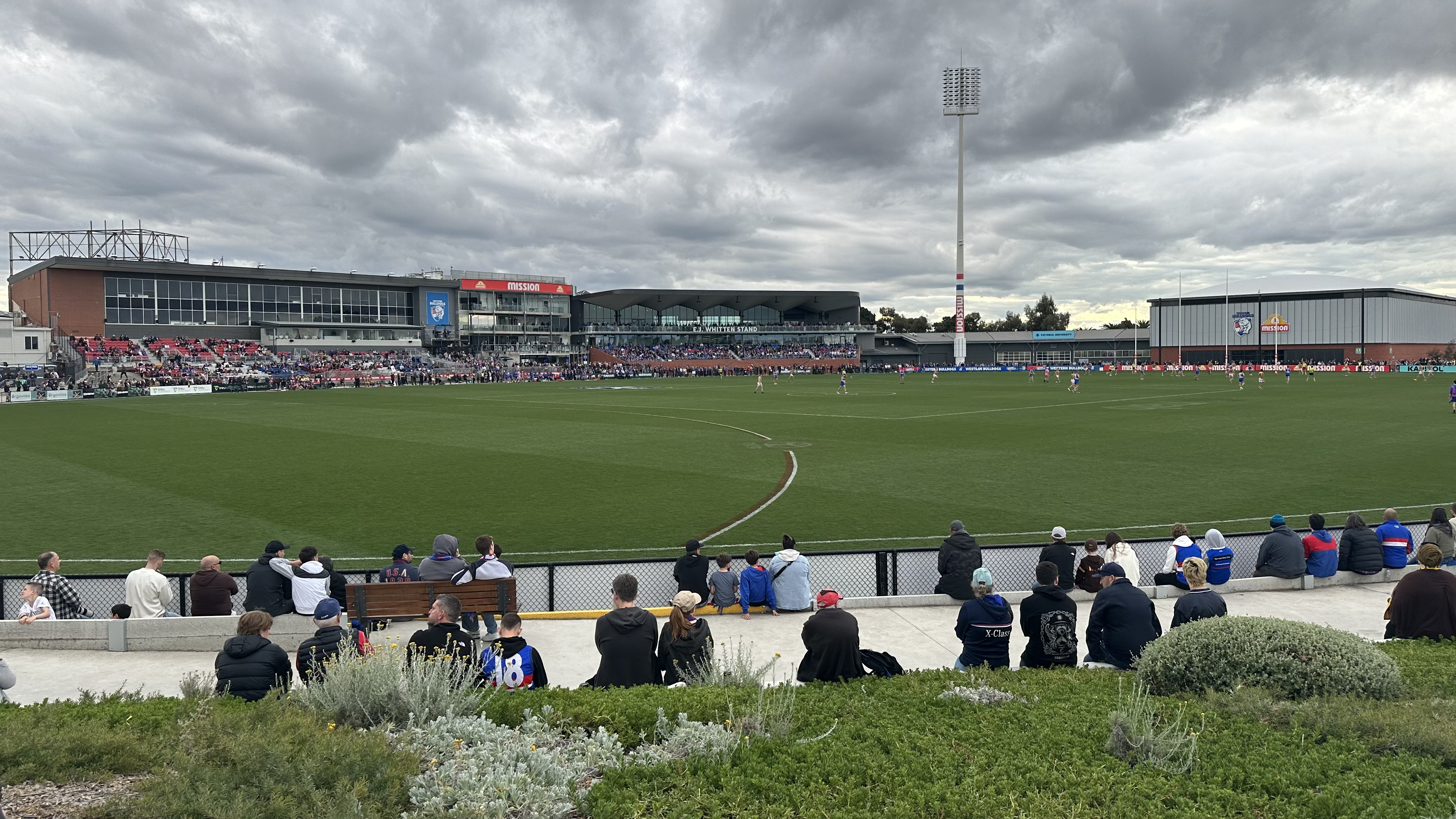
Whitten Oval, the club's AFLW/VFL/VFLW home ground, training base and administrative headquarters

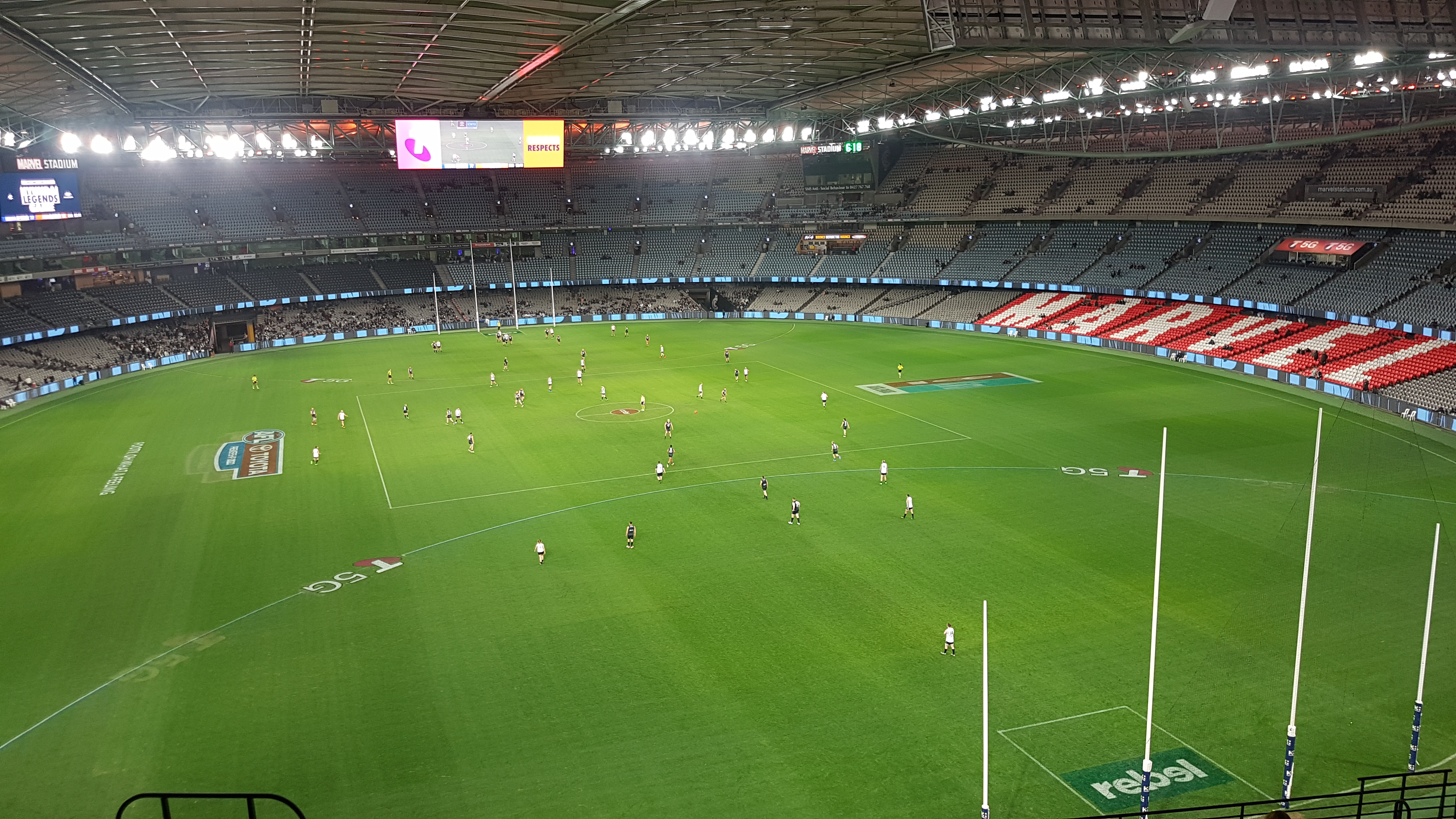
The Western Bulldogs play their home games at Docklands Stadium, located in Melbourne's Docklands area

The club played its home matches at the Western Oval, located in the inner-western Melbourne suburb of Footscray, from 1884 until 1997 (except for a brief period at nearby Yarraville Oval, from 1941 to 1943). Home to the club's training facilities and administrative headquarters, the oval, nicknamed "The Kennel", was officially renamed Whitten Oval in 1995 in honour of club legend Ted Whitten, who died earlier that year. It underwent a A$20 million redevelopment in 2005.

Melbourne's Princes Park became the Western Bulldogs' primary home ground from 1997 until 1999. Since 2000, the club has been based at Docklands Stadium (currently known as Marvel Stadium), and as of 2017, two home games will be played each season at Eureka Stadium (known as Mars Stadium for sponsorship reasons) in Ballarat.

=== Guernsey ===
- The home guernsey is primarily royal blue with a red and white hoop. The player numbers are white, and located high upon the back. Although the team officially trades under the name "Western Bulldogs", the initials "F.F.C." for Footscray Football Club, which still remains the club's official name, are placed on the front of the jumper beneath the sponsor's logo in small blue capital letters.
- The clash jumper is primarily white, with a red and blue hoop around the chest area. The player's number is blue, and located high upon the back.

=== Uniform evolution ===
Below are some significant uniforms in the history of the Western Bulldogs. Most are generalisations and saw minor changes over the period of their use.

Pre-VFL

1877–85	1886	1901–24

VFL/AFL

1925–34	1935	1936–74	1975–79	1980–96	1997–2011	2012–

=== Banners ===
In 2014, the Bulldogs accepted an offer from comedian and supporter Danny McGinlay to write the messages that appear on the club's banners. While AFL clubs traditionally use banners to celebrate milestones or to write motivational messages, McGinlay's "amusing pieces of throwaway banter" at the expense of opposing clubs have acquired cult status in the game, and occasionally proved controversial.

=== In popular culture ===
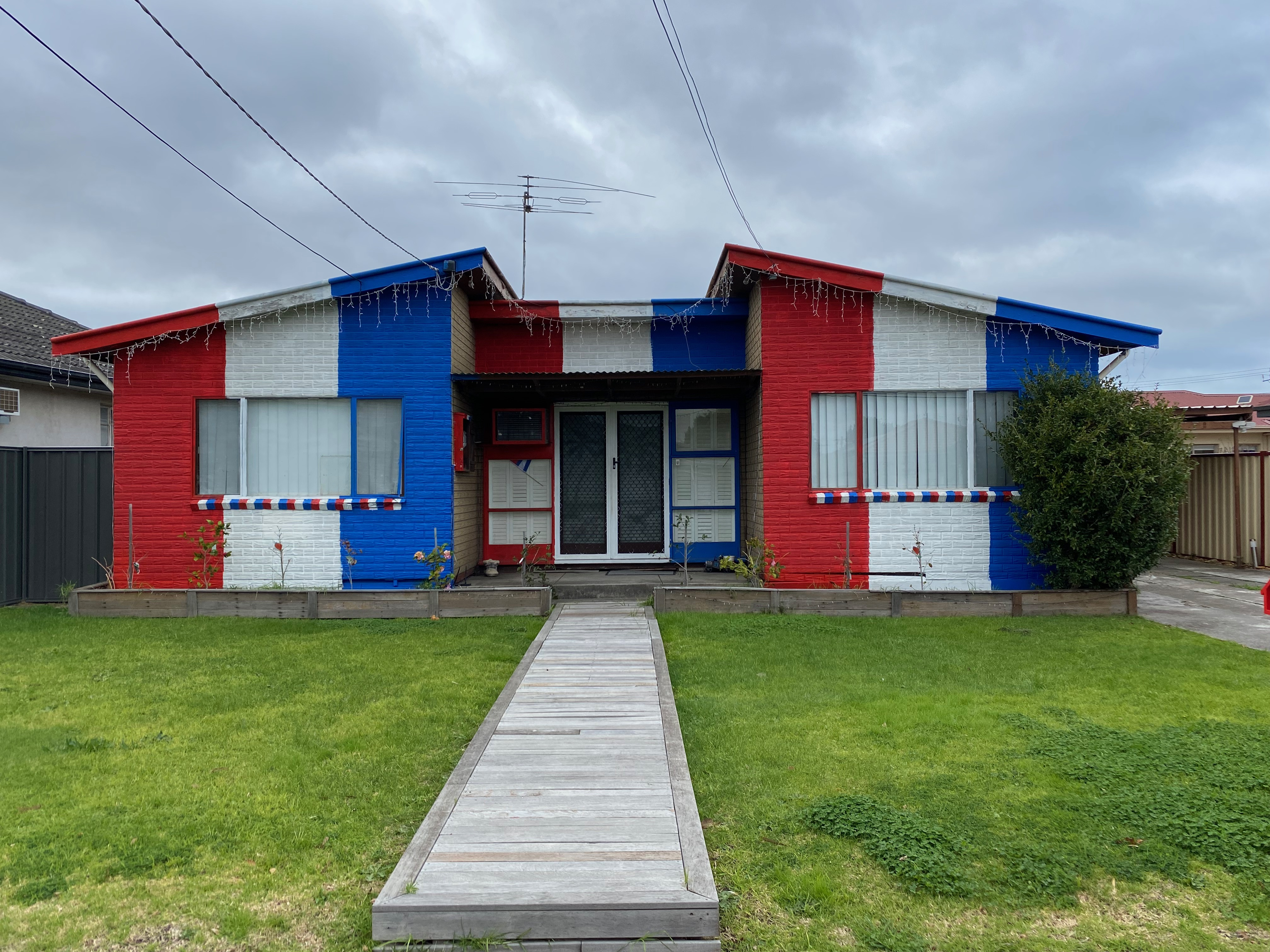
House painted in Western Bulldogs colours in Melbourne's western suburbs

William Ellis Green ("WEG"), cartoonist for The Herald, began a VFL/AFL Grand Final tradition in 1954 after drawing a full-page caricature of the Western Bulldogs mascot. It is the most valuable and sought-after of WEG's Grand Final posters.

Martin Flanagan's 1994 book Southern Sky, Western Oval reflects on the Western Bulldogs' fight for survival when it faced a merger with Fitzroy in the late 1980s. The award-winning documentary Year of the Dogs gives an inside look at the Western Bulldogs over the course of the 1996 AFL season.

Author and Bulldogs fan Helen Garner chronicles the fortunes of the club in her 2024 book The Season.

Footscray Bulldogs merchandise has appeared in screen works, including the 1992 film Romper Stomper, which revolves around the exploits and downfall of a violent skinhead gang based in Footscray; and in episodes of Degrassi Junior High.

== Membership and attendance ==
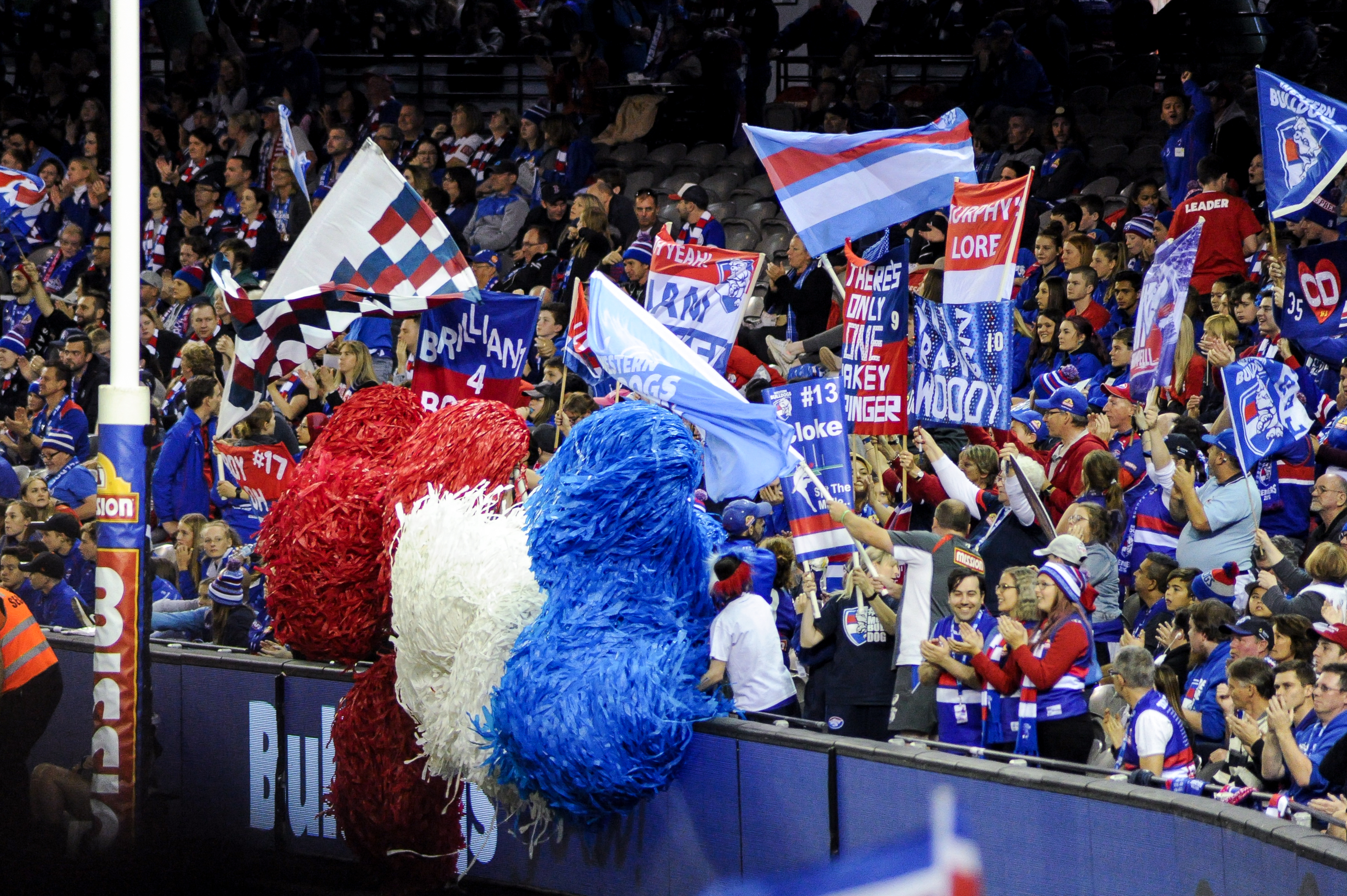
Western Bulldogs cheer squad

Compared to other Victorian AFL clubs, the Western Bulldogs have had historically low membership numbers. However, the club broke its membership record in 2006 and continued to sustain these figures before another significant increase in 2010. In 2015, the club reached 35,000 members for the first time, and ended the season with an official tally of 36,213. In 2016, the Bulldogs equalled the club's previous year's tally by mid-May, and again reached record-breaking membership numbers by July, with 39,459 fans having signed up. It was also the second successive year in which the club had recorded double-digit percentage growth in membership.

Year	Members	Change from previous season	Finishing position	Home game attendance	Change from previous season
1984	6,491	-	7th	18,789	–
1985	8,030	▲1,539	2nd	21,624	▲2,835
1986	8,433	▲403	8th	22,036	▲412
1987	3,452	▼4,981	7th	16,886	▼5,150
1988	5,351	▲1,899	8th	15,910	▼976
1989	5,168	▼183	8th	22,036	▲6,126
1990	10,983	▲5,815	7th	22,290	▲254
1991	9,598	▼1,385	10th	17,457	▼4,833
1992	9,391	▼207	2nd	20,909	▲3,452
1993	11,478	▲2,087	9th	21,085	▲176
1994	9,339	▼2,139	5th	20,578	▼507
1995	12,212	▲2,873	7th	21,989	▲1,411
1996	10,650	▼1,562	15th	18,072	▼3,917
1997	15,054	▲4,404	3rd	19,334	▲1,262
1998	20,064	▲5,010	2nd	23,832	▲4,498
1999	20,491	▲427	4th	24,023	▲191
2000	18,056	▼2,435	7th	30,572	▲6,549
2001	19,085	▲1,029	10th	29,660	▼912
2002	20,838	▲1,753	12th	25,518	▼4,142
2003	21,260	▲422	16th	25,038	▼480
2004	19,295	▼1,965	14th	26,097	▲1,059
2005	21,975	▲2,680	9th	28,320	▲2,223
2006	26,042	▲4,067	8th	33,253	▲4,933
2007	28,725	▲2,683	13th	28,777	▼4,476
2008	28,306	▼419	3rd	30,275	▲1,498
2009	28,590	▲284	3rd	32,877	▲2,602
2010	34,842	▲6,252	4th	30,447	▼2,430
2011	32,125	▼2,717	10th	26,294	▼4,153
2012	30,007	▼2,118	15th	23,317	▼2,977
2013	30,204	▲197	15th	22,132	▼1,185
2014	31,725	▲1,521	14th	22,265	▲133
2015	35,991	▲4,266	6th	23,478	▲1,213
2016	39,459	▲3,468	7th	30,699	▲7,221
2017	47,653	▲8,194	10th	31,473	▲774
2018	43,246	▼4,407	13th	25,372	▼6,101
2019	44,373	▲1,127	7th	26,747	▲1,375
2020	38,876	▼5,497	7th	3,894	▼22,853
2021	46,541	▲7,665	5th	31,981	▲28,087
2022	50,941	▲4,400	8th	28,600	▼3,381
2023	56,302	▲5,361	9th	30,412	▲1,812
2024	62,109	▲5,807	6th	31,662	▲1,250
2025	65,584	▲3,475	9th	34,470	▲2,808

== Playing lists ==
=== Current squad ===
Western Bulldogs · AFL personnel
Playing list		Inactive list	Coaching staff
2 Lachlan Carmichael; 3 Cody Weightman; 4 Marcus Bontempelli (c); 5 Jedd Busslinger; 6 Cooper Hynes; 7 Rory Lobb; 8 Matthew Kennedy; 9 Ryley Sanders; 10 Sam Darcy; 11 Lachie Jaques; 14 Rhylee West; 15 Will Darcy; 16 Jordan Croft; 18 James O'Donnell; 19 Connor Budarick; 20 Ed Richards; 22 Caleb May*; 23 Laitham Vandermeer; 24 Buku Khamis	25 Louis Emmett; 26 Josh Dolan; 27 Joel Freijah; 28 Will Lewis*; 29 Lachlan Bramble; 31 Bailey Dale; 32 Arthur Jones; 33 Aaron Naughton (vc); 34 Bailey Williams; 35 Luke Kennedy; 36 Luke Cleary; 37 Michael Sellwood*; 38 Riley Garcia*; 42 Sam Davidson; 44 Tim English; Zak Butters; Jordon Butts; Finn Maginness; Hudson O'Keeffe		Senior coach: Luke Beveridge; Assistant coaches: Brendon Lade (midfield); Ben Reid (forward line); Jarryn Geary (development); Jack Billings (development); Anthony Barry (development); Legend: (c) captain; (vc) vice-captain; * rookie; Updated: 13 November 2026; Sources: Players, coaches

== Corporate ==
Guernsey sponsors
Period	Front sponsor	Back sponsor	Above number
1978–81	Pyrox		
1982	KB		
1983–86	Eastcoast		
1987	Hunters		
1990–97	ICI Dulux (back sponsor from 1994 onwards)		
1998	Orica	Dulux	
1999–2001	Vodafone		
2002–2008	Leaseplan		
2009–2017	Mission Foods	Mission Foods	
2018–2020	Mission Foods	Mercedes Benz	
2021–2023	Mission Foods	Coinspot	Pedigree
2024–present	Mission Foods	Coinspot	Allied Express

=== Administrative positions ===
- President: Kylie Watson-Wheeler
- Chief executive: Ameet Bains
- Football operations:Matthew Egan
- Board members:
  - Luke Darcy
  - Belinda Duarte
  - Mark Evans
  - Lisa Fitzpatrick
  - Fiona McGauchie
  - Chris Nolan
  - Jerril Rechter AM
  - Levent Shevki

=== Sponsors ===
Current major sponsors

- Mission Foods (major)
- CoinSpot (principal)

Premier partners

- ASICS
- City of Ballarat
- Victoria State Government
- Pedigree Petfoods
- Victoria University

Apparel sponsors

- Canterbury (1998)
- FILA (1999–2002)
- Diadora (2005–2009)
- KooGa/BLK (2010–2016)
- ASICS (2017–present)

== Supporters ==
Prominent people who have supported the Western Bulldogs include:

- Wil Anderson, comedian
- Tim Cahill, Australian professional footballer
- Shane Delia, celebrity chef
- Helen Garner, author
- Julia Gillard, former Prime Minister
- Chris Hemsworth, actor
- Liam Hemsworth, actor
- Jill Hennessy, state Labor politician
- Michael Jakobsen, Danish professional footballer
- Jess Jonassen, cricketer
- Merv Hughes, cricketer
- Mark Labbett, professional English quizzer best known for his roles on the British and Australian versions of game show The Chase
- Chas Licciardello, comedian
- Scott McLaughlin, V8 Supercars champion
- Michael Rowland, news presenter
- Ernie Sigley, entertainer
- Thomas Sorensen, Danish professional footballer

Number-one ticket holders include:

- Alan Johnstone, head of Penfold Motors and former Bulldogs board member
- Julia Gillard

== Match records ==
(Correct at end of 2024 season)

- Highest score: 33.15 (213) v St Kilda 16.10 (106) – Round 13, 1978 at Western Oval
- Lowest score: 1.8 (14) v Geelong 5.13 (43) – Round 12, 1965 at Western Oval
- Highest losing score: 22.13 (145) v Kangaroos 24.12 (156) – Round 10, 2003 at Docklands Stadium
- Lowest winning score: 4.11 (35) v Fitzroy 3.16 (34), Round 21, 1976 at VFL Park
- Greatest winning margin: 128 points – 25.17 (167) v North Melbourne 5.9 (39) – Round 3, 2021 at Marvel Stadium
- Greatest losing margin: 146 points – 9.8 (62) v Essendon 32.16 (208) – Round 22, 1982 at Western Oval
- Record attendance (home and away game): 78,027 v Collingwood – Round 2, 2025 at MCG
- Record attendance (finals match): 107,935 v Hawthorn – 1961 VFL Grand Final

Source:AFL Tables

== Honours and achievements ==
=== Honours ===
Premierships
Competition	Level	Wins	Years won
Australian Football League	Seniors	2	1954, 2016
Australian Football League	Reserves (1919–1999)	6	1936, 1945, 1962, 1988, 1994, 1998
Australian Football League	Under 19s (1946–1991)	1	1954
Victorian Football League	Seniors (1877–1924)	9	1898, 1899, 1900, 1908, 1913, 1919, 1920, 1923, 1924
Victorian Football League	Reserves (2014–present)	3	2014, 2016, 2025
AFL Women's	Seniors	1	2018
Other titles and honours
VFL Night Series/Pre Season Titles	Seniors	5	1963, 1964, 1967, 1970, 2010
Finishing positions
Australian Football League	Minor premiership (McClelland Trophy)	0	Nil
Australian Football League	Grand Finalist	2	1961, 2021
Australian Football League	Wooden spoons	4	1959, 1967, 1982, 2003
AFL Women's	Minor premiership	1	2018
AFL Women's	Wooden spoons	1	2023

=== Hall of Fame ===
The Footscray-Western Bulldogs Hall of Fame was established in 2010 to honour "those whose involvement and contribution to [the] club has been significant, memorable and worthy of celebration."

Players who have been retired for at least two years are eligible for induction, and while individual playing records, including club and representative games, club and individual honours and premierships are considered, candidates "must also have given outstanding and devoted service to the club". Officials and administrators are also eligible for induction. The current Hall of Fame selection committee comprises: David Smorgon OAM, Darren Arthur, Terry Wheeler, Ray Walker and Mike Sheahan.

- Brackets with years next to members names indicate year of induction or, in the case of a Legend, year of elevation to Legend status. No year in brackets indicates that a member was an inaugural inductee
- Members with names in **bold** are also in the Australian Football Hall of Fame
- Members with an asterisk* next to their names are Legends in the Australian Football Hall of Fame

Footscray-Western Bulldogs Hall of Fame
**Legends**
**Doug Hawkins** (2014)	**John Schultz** (2012)	**Charles Sutton**	**Ted Whitten** *	**Chris Grant** (2018)
**Norman Ware** (2018)	**Allan Hopkins** (2018)	**Arthur Olliver** (2023)	**Gary Dempsey** (2023)	
**Pioneers**
Victor A. Samson	David De Coite	Archie Clarke	William Harris	Norman Ford
John F. Craddock	James Cuming	Vernon Banbury	Con McCarthy	Joseph Marmo
Arthur Gregory	Jim Cassidy	Roy Cotton		
**Inductees**
Simon Beasley	George Bisset (2012)	Peter Box (2018)	Jack Collins	
Wally Donald (2012)	Herb Henderson (2012)	Harry Hickey	John Jillard (2014)	**Brad Johnson** (2014)
Tony Liberatore	Alby Morrison		**Bernie Quinlan** (2018)	Don Ross (2018)
Brian Royal (2012)	Joe Ryan (2012)	Rohan Smith (2014)	Kelvin Templeton	Stephen Wallis (2018)
**Scott West** (2012)	Scott Wynd (2012)	Jim Gallagher (2023)	Bob Murphy (2023)	Dale Morris (2023)
Matthew Boyd (2023)	Luke Darcy (2023)			
**Officials**
Roy Russell	Peter Gordon	David Smorgon (2018)		
**Moments**
**Footscray's first VFL finals appearance**	In 1938, 13 years after being admitted to the VFL, Footscray became the first of the "new" teams to qualify for a VFL finals series, and faced Collingwood in the first semi-final at the MCG on Saturday 3 September. In front of over 68,000 spectators (a record at the time), the Bulldogs acquitted themselves well against the previous year's Grand finalist, and only poor finishing in the second quarter prevented them being in front at half time. While Footscray did grab the lead briefly at the start of the second half, the experience and class of the Magpies was telling as they kicked six goals in as many minutes and eventually ran out winners by 39 points.			
**The 1954 VFL premiership**	During the 1954 season, the club started the season slowly, losing the first two matches by small margins, before an 87-point victory over South Melbourne. On the back of performances from captain-coach Charlie Sutton, club legend Ted Whitten and Leading Goalkicker Medallist Jack Collins The club would make finals for only the eighth time in their history, in beating Geelong in the semi-final they would eliminate past demons, with Geelong defeating them in the previous seasons preliminary final. This win would take them to their first Grand Final, with Melbourne joining them. A bumper crowd of 80,897 would pour into the MCG with police having to seat crowd members on the ground itself to avoid injuries. By half time, Collins had kicked three of his eventual seven goals and pushed the Bulldogs to a 53–30 lead. By the final break, they were six goals ahead, eventually coming out 51-point winners (6.3, 8.5, 12.9, 15.12 (102)) to (1.4, 4.6, 6.7, 7.9 (51)). Rover John Kerr was judged best for the Bulldogs, with Collins' seven goals an incredible effort. Over 20,000 people were present at the Western Oval sparking celebrations that continued for over 10 hours after the game had finished.			
**The Neil Sachse Incident**	On 12 April 1975 at the Western Oval, in only his second game for the Bulldogs, star South Australian recruit Neil Sachse was the victim of one of Australian rules football's most tragic on-field incidents. Late in the game, the North Adelaide premiership player collided with Fitzroy defender Kevin O'Keeffe in what then Bulldogs club president Dick Collinson described as a "freak accident". Sachse was stretchered off and transferred to the spinal unit at the Austin Hospital, where he would spend months adjusting to life as a quadriplegic. He would later establish the Neil Sachse Foundation with the aim of finding a cure for spinal cord injury			
**The 2018 AFLW premiership**	The Western Bulldogs had been among the first AFL clubs to have a women's team with Melbourne and the Bulldogs playing the first women's exhibition matches from 2013, before the AFLW began formally in 2017. After finishing with only two wins in the 2017 season, the Bulldogs began the 2018 season losing Izzy Huntingdon and Daria Bannister to injury in the first two rounds, before inaugural captain Katie Brennan was sidelined with an ankle injury. Despite this, the Bulldogs finished the season with only two losses for the clubs first minor premiership in men's or women's football, and a berth in the Grand Final against the Brisbane Lions, the previous season's runner up. Despite a goalless first half, and trailing the Lions by six points leading into the second half of the game, three goals from Deanna Berry, Kristen McLeod and Monique Conti in the third quarter and a diving defensive mark by Naomi Ferres in the dying seconds sealed a six-point win for the Bulldogs and their first AFLW premiership.			

== Team of the Century ==
In May 2002, the club announced a team of the greatest players from the century of 1900 to 1999.

Western Bulldogs Team of the Century (1900–1999)
B:	Charlie Sutton	Herb Henderson	John Schultz
HB:	Wally Donald	Ted Whitten (c)	John Jillard
C:	Harry Hickey	Allan Hopkins	Doug Hawkins
HF:	Alby Morrison	Kelvin Templeton	Chris Grant
F:	Jack Collins	Simon Beasley	George Bisset
Foll:	Gary Dempsey	Scott West	Brian Royal
Int:	Jim Gallagher	Arthur Olliver	Brad Johnson
Int:	Norman Ware	Tony Liberatore	Scott Wynd
Coach:	Charlie Sutton		

== Club records ==
- Most career games: 364 by Brad Johnson (1994–2010)
- Most career goals: 575 by Simon Beasley (1982–1989)
- Most goals in a season: 118 by Kelvin Templeton (1978)
- Most goals in a game: 15 by Kelvin Templeton
- Most goals in debut game: 9 by Bill Wood
- Most Charles Sutton Medals won: 7 by Scott West

== VFL/AFL ladder positions (1925–present) ==
Finishing Position	Year (Finals in Bold, Premierships in Italics)	Tally
1st	nil	0
2nd	**1954**, **1985, 1992, 1998**	4
3rd	**1938**, **1953**, **1946**, **1997**, **2008**, **2009**	6
4th	**1942**, **1944**, **1948**, **1951**, **1956**, **1961**, **1999**, **2010**	8
5th	1931, 1945, 1955, 1962, **1974**, **1976**, **1999**, **2021**	8
6th	1940, 1941, 1943, 1957, **2015**, **2024**	6
7th	1928, 1932, 1933, 1964, 1970, 1972, 1975, 1977, 1983, 1984, 1987, 1990, **1995**, **2000**, **2016**, **2019**, **2020**	17
8th	1971, 1986, 1988, **2006**, **2022**, **2026**	6
9th	1929, 1934, 1947, 1949, 1963, 1973, 1979, 1993, 2005, 2023, 2025	11
10th	1926, 1927, 1936, 1937, 1950, 1952, 1960, 1965, 1966, 1968, 1980, 1991, 2001, 2011, 2017	15
11th	1925, 1930, 1935, 1939, 1958, 1969, 1978, 1981	8
12th	1959, 1967, 1982, 2002	4
13th	1989, 2007, 2018	3
14th	2004, 2014	2
15th	1996, 2012, 2013	3
16th	2003	1
17th	nil	0
18th	nil	0

Notes: The Top 4 teams made finals until 1971, Top 5 between 1972 and 1990, Top 6 between 1991–1993 and Top 8 from 1994 onwards.

== Honour Roll ==
Legend:
Premiers, Grand finalist, Finals, Wooden spoon, Club Record Brownlow & BnF
Bold italics: Coleman Medal Winner as well as Club Leading Goalkicker

Footscray/Western Bulldogs AFL honour roll
Season	Ladder	W–L–D	Finals	Coach	Captain(s)	Charles Sutton Medalist	Leading goalkicker
1925	11th	4-13-0	Did not qualify	Con McCarthy	Con McCarthy		Allan Hopkins (40)
1926	10th	4-14-0	Did not qualify	Jim Cassidy / Harry Saunders	Con McCarthy / Allan Hopkins		Allan Hopkins / Les Chapple (42)
1927	10th	6-12-0	Did not qualify	Paddy Scanlan	Paddy Scanlan	Ivan McAlpine	Les Chapple (32)
1928	7th	9-9-0	Did not qualify	Paddy Scanlan	Paddy Scanlan	Alby Outen	Alby Morrison (50)
1929	9th	6-11-1	Did not qualify	Alec Eason	Alec Eason	Bill Russ	Alby Morrison (50)
1930	11th	4-14-0	Did not qualify	Allan Hopkins	Allan Hopkins	Ivan McAlpine (2)	Alby Morrison (48)
1931	5th	12-6-0	Did not qualify	Bill Cubbins	Bill Cubbins	Allan Hopkins	Alby Morrison (36)
1932	7th	9-9-0	Did not qualify	Bill Cubbins	Bill Cubbins	Ivan McAlpine (3)	Les Dayman (37)
1933	7th	11-7-0	Did not qualify	Bill Cubbins	Ivan McAlpine	Alby Morrison	Alan Rait (46)
1934	11th	6-12-0	Did not qualify	Bill Cubbins / Alby Morrison	Bill Cubbins / Alby Morrison	Norman Ware	Alby Morrison (46)
1935	11th	2-14-2	Did not qualify	Alby Morrison / Syd Coventry	Alby Morrison	George Bennett	Jack Ryan (25)
1936	10th	5-13-0	Did not qualify	Syd Coventry	Stan Penberthy	Alby Morrison (2)	Arthur Olliver (37)
1937	11th	4-14-0	Did not qualify	Syd Coventry / Joe Kelly	Sid Dockendorff / Alby Morrison	Norman Ware (2)	Arthur Olliver (39)
1938	3rd	13-5-0	Semi Final	Joe Kelly	Roy Evans	Norman Ware (3)	Charlie Luke (44)
1939	11th	4-14-0	Did not qualify	Joe Kelly	Roy Evans	Harry Hickey	Charlie Page (31)
1940	6th	9-9-0	Did not qualify	Joe Kelly	Norman Ware	Norman Ware (4)	Charlie Page (52)
1941	6th	10-8-0	Did not qualify	Norman Ware	Norman Ware	Norman Ware (5) / Arthur Olliver	Allan Collins (35)
1942	4th	10-4-0	Semi Final	Norman Ware	Norman Ware	Ted Ellis	Norman Ware (51)
1943	6th	7-8-0	Did not qualify	Arthur Olliver	Arthur Olliver	Allan Collins	Allan Collins (41)
1944	4th	12-5-1	Semi Final	Arthur Olliver	Arthur Olliver	Arthur Olliver (2)	Bill Wood (51)
1945	5th	12-8-0	Did not qualify	Arthur Olliver	Arthur Olliver	Harry Hickey (2)	Joe Ryan (37)
1946	4th	13-6-0	Semi Final	Arthur Olliver	Arthur Olliver	Joe Ryan	Bill Wood (52)
1947	9th	8-10-1	Did not qualify	Jim Crowe	Harry Hickey	Joe Ryan (2)	Bill Wood (75)
1948	4th	12-7-0	Semi Final	Arthur Olliver	Arthur Olliver	Harry Hickey (3)	Bill Wood (41)
1949	9th	7-12-0	Did not qualify	Arthur Olliver	Arthur Olliver	Wally Donald	Arthur Olliver (28)
1950	10th	5-13-0	Did not qualify	Arthur Olliver	Arthur Olliver	Charlie Sutton	Bill Wood (45)
1951	4th	12-6-0	Semi Final	Charlie Sutton	Charlie Sutton	Jack Collins	Charlie Sutton / Alby Linton (23)
1952	10th	5-14-0	Did not qualify	Charlie Sutton	Charlie Sutton	Jack Collins (2)	Roger Duffy (20)
1953	3rd	13-5-0	Preliminary Final	Charlie Sutton	Charlie Sutton	Harvey Stevens	Jack Collins (50)
1954	2nd	11-6-1	Premiers	Charlie Sutton	Charlie Sutton	Ted Whitten	Jack Collins (84)
1955	5th	12-6-0	Did not qualify	Charlie Sutton	Charlie Sutton	Peter Box	Jack Collins (60)
1956	4th	11-7-0	Preliminary Final	Charlie Sutton	Charlie Sutton / Wally Donald	Don Ross	Max Cross (52)
1957	6th	9-11-1	Did not qualify	Charlie Sutton / Ted Whitten	Harvey Stevens /Ted Whitten	Ted Whitten (2)	Jack Collins (74)
1958	11th	6-12-0	Did not qualify	Ted Whitten	Ted Whitten	Ted Whitten (3)	Jack Collins (49)
1959	12th	3-15-0	Did not qualify	Ted Whitten	Ted Whitten	Ted Whitten (4)	Ray Walker (35)
1960	10th	6-12-0	Did not qualify	Ted Whitten	Ted Whitten	John Schultz	Ray Walker (37)
1961	4th	11-7-0	Runner Up	Ted Whitten	Ted Whitten	Ted Whitten (5)	Ted Whitten (42)
1962	5th	11-7-0	Did not qualify	Ted Whitten	Ted Whitten	John Schultz (2)	Ted Whitten (38)
1963	9th	7-11-0	Did not qualify	Ted Whitten	Ted Whitten	Ray Walker	George Bisset / Merv Hobbs (16)
1964	7th	9-9-0	Did not qualify	Ted Whitten	Ted Whitten	John Schultz (3)	Ted Whitten / George Bisset (24)
1965	10th	4-14-0	Did not qualify	Ted Whitten	Ted Whitten	John Schultz (4)	Merv Hobbs (24)
1966	10th	4-14-0	Did not qualify	Ted Whitten	Ted Whitten	John Schultz (5)	Kevin Jackman (28)
1967	12th	4-14-0	Did not qualify	Charlie Sutton	Ted Whitten	John Jillard	George Bisset (27)
1968	10th	5-15-0	Did not qualify	Charlie Sutton	Ted Whitten	David Thorpe	Ted Whitten (36)
1969	11th	6-14-0	Did not qualify	Ted Whitten	Ted Whitten	George Bisset	George Bisset (45)
1970	8th	11-11-0	Did not qualify	Ted Whitten	Ted Whitten / Stuart Magee	Gary Dempsey	George Bisset (45)
1971	8th	11-11-0	Did not qualify	Ted Whitten	Gary Dempsey	David Thorpe	Bernie Quinlan (48)
1972	7th	11-11-0	Did not qualify	Bob Rose	Gary Dempsey	Peter Welsh	Laurie Sandilands (39)
1973	9th	7-14-1	Did not qualify	Bob Rose	David Thorpe	Gary Dempsey (2)	Laurie Sandilands (34)
1974	5th	13-8-1	Elimination Final	Bob Rose	Laurie Sandilands	Gary Dempsey (3)	Laurie Sandilands (50)
1975	7th	11-11-0	Did not qualify	Bob Rose	Laurie Sandilands	Gary Dempsey (4)	Laurie Sandilands (47)
1976	5th	11-10-1	Elimination Final	Bill Goggin	Laurie Sandilands	Gary Dempsey (5)	Kelvin Templeton (82)
1977	7th	10-11-1	Did not qualify	Bill Goggin / Don McKenzie	Gary Dempsey	Gary Dempsey (6)	Kelvin Templeton (40)
1978	11th	7-15-0	Did not qualify	Don McKenzie	Geoff Jennings	Kelvin Templeton	Kelvin Templeton (118)
1979	9th	7-14-1	Did not qualify	Don McKenzie	Geoff Jennings	Ian Dunstan	Kelvin Templeton (91)
1980	10th	5-17-0	Did not qualify	Royce Hart	Geoff Jennings	Kelvin Templeton (2)	Kelvin Templeton (75)
1981	11th	2-20-0	Did not qualify	Royce Hart	Geoff Jennings	Ian Dunstan (2)	Jim Edmond / Shane Loveless (25)
1982	12th	3-19-0	Did not qualify	Royce Hart / Ian Hampshire	Kelvin Templeton	Ian Dunstan (3)	Simon Beasley (82)
1983	7th	10-12-0	Did not qualify	Ian Hampshire	Jim Edmond	Brian Royal	Simon Beasley (69)
1984	7th	11-11-0	Did not qualify	Michael Malthouse	Jim Edmond	Andrew Purser	Simon Beasley (61)
1985	2nd	16-6-0	Preliminary Final	Michael Malthouse	Jim Edmond	Doug Hawkins	Simon Beasley (105)
1986	8th	11-11-0	Did not qualify	Michael Malthouse	Rick Kennedy	Brad Hardie	Simon Beasley (88)
1987	8th	11-10-1	Did not qualify	Michael Malthouse	Rick Kennedy	Tony McGuinness	Simon Beasley (73)
1988	8th	11-11-0	Did not qualify	Michael Malthouse	Rick Kennedy	Terry Wallace	Simon Beasley (82)
1989	13th	6-15-1	Did not qualify	Michael Malthouse	Stephen Wallis	Terry Wallace (2)	Anthony Campbell (21)
1990	7th	12-10-0	Did not qualify	Terry Wheeler	Doug Hawkins	Peter Foster	Chris Grant (51)
1991	10th	9-12-1	Did not qualify	Terry Wheeler	Doug Hawkins	Tony Liberatore	Doug Hawkins (38)
1992	2nd	16-6-0	Preliminary Final	Terry Wheeler	Doug Hawkins	Scott Wynd	Danny Del-Re (70)
1993	9th	11-9-0	Did not qualify	Terry Wheeler	Doug Hawkins	Leon Cameron	Danny Del-Re (36)
1994	5th	13-9-0	Semi Final	Terry Wheeler / Alan Joyce	Scott Wynd	Chris Grant	Chris Grant (71)
1995	7th	11-10-1	Elimination Final	Alan Joyce	Scott Wynd	Scott West	Richard Osborne (53)
1996	15th	5-16-1	Did not qualify	Alan Joyce / Terry Wallace	Scott Wynd	Chris Grant (2) / Jose Romero	Jason Watts (44)
1997	3rd	14-8-0	Preliminary Final	Terry Wallace	Scott Wynd	Scott West (2)	Simon Minton-Connell (43)
1998	2nd	15-7-0	Preliminary Final	Terry Wallace	Scott Wynd	Scott West (3)	Paul Hudson (61)
1999	4th	15-6-1	Semi Final	Terry Wallace	Scott Wynd	Brad Johnson	Paul Hudson (51)
2000	7th	12-10-0	Elimination Final	Terry Wallace	Scott Wynd	Scott West(4)	Rohan Smith (42)
2001	10th	10-12-0	Did not qualify	Terry Wallace	Chris Grant	Luke Darcy	Brad Johnson (48)
2002	12th	9-12-1	Did not qualify	Terry Wallace / Peter Rohde	Chris Grant	Brad Johnson (2)	Nathan Brown (57)
2003	16th	3-18-1	Did not qualify	Peter Rohde	Chris Grant	Scott West (5)	Nathan Brown (56)
2004	14th	5-17-0	Did not qualify	Peter Rohde	Chris Grant	Scott West (6)	Luke Darcy & Jade Rawlings (30)
2005	9th	11-11-0	Did not qualify	Rodney Eade	Luke Darcy	Scott West (7)	Brad Johnson (42)
2006	8th	13-9-0	Semi Final	Rodney Eade	Luke Darcy	Brad Johnson (3)	Brad Johnson (74)
2007	13rd	9-12-1	Did not qualify	Rodney Eade	Brad Johnson	Brian Lake	Brad Johnson (59)
2008	3rd	15–6–1	Preliminary Final	Rodney Eade	Brad Johnson	Daniel Cross	Brad Johnson (50)
2009	3rd	15–7–0	Preliminary Final	Rodney Eade	Brad Johnson	Matthew Boyd	Jason Akermanis (43)
2010	3rd	14–8–0	Preliminary Final	Rodney Eade	Brad Johnson	Ryan Griffen	Barry Hall (80)
2011	10th	9–13–0	Did not qualify	Rodney Eade/ Paul Williams	Matthew Boyd	Matthew Boyd (2)	Daniel Giansiracusa (28)
2012	15th	5–17–0	Did not qualify	Brendan McCartney	Matthew Boyd	Matthew Boyd (3)	Daniel Giansiracusa (28)
2013	15th	8–14–0	Did not qualify	Brendan McCartney	Matthew Boyd	Ryan Griffen (2)	Daniel Giansiracusa (36)
2014	14th	7–15–0	Did not qualify	Brendan McCartney	Ryan Griffen	Tom Liberatore	Stewart Crameri (37)
2015	6th	14–8–0	Elimination Final	Luke Beveridge	Bob Murphy	Easton Wood	Jake Stringer (56)
2016	7th	15–7–0	Premiers	Luke Beveridge	Bob Murphy/Easton Wood	Marcus Bontempelli	Jake Stringer (42)
2017	10th	11–11–0	Did not qualify	Luke Beveridge	Bob Murphy	Marcus Bontempelli (2)	Liam Picken (24)
2018	13th	8–14–0	Did not qualify	Luke Beveridge	Easton Wood	Lachie Hunter	Billy Gowers (26)
2019	7th	12–10–0	Elimination Final	Luke Beveridge	Easton Wood	Marcus Bontempelli (3)	Sam Lloyd (38)
2020*	7th	10–7–0	Elimination Final	Luke Beveridge	Marcus Bontempelli	Caleb Daniel	Mitch Wallis (25)
2021	5th	15–7–0	Runner Up	Luke Beveridge	Marcus Bontempelli	Marcus Bontempelli (4)	Josh Bruce (48)
2022	8th	12–10–0	Elimination Final	Luke Beveridge	Marcus Bontempelli	Josh Dunkley	Aaron Naughton (51)
2023	9th	12-11–0	Did not qualify	Luke Beveridge	Marcus Bontempelli	Marcus Bontempelli (5)	Aaron Naughton (44)
2024	6th	14–9–0	Elimination Final	Luke Beveridge	Marcus Bontempelli	Marcus Bontempelli (6)	Jamarra Ugle-Hagan (43)
2025	9th	14–9–0	Did not qualify	Luke Beveridge	Marcus Bontempelli	Ed Richards	Aaron Naughton (60)
2026	8th	13-9-1	Elimination Final	Luke Beveridge	Marcus Bontempelli	Marcus Bontempelli (7)	Aaron Naughton (51)

*Shortened season. Sources: AFL Tables and Western Bulldogs

== Individual awards ==
=== Brownlow Medal winners ===
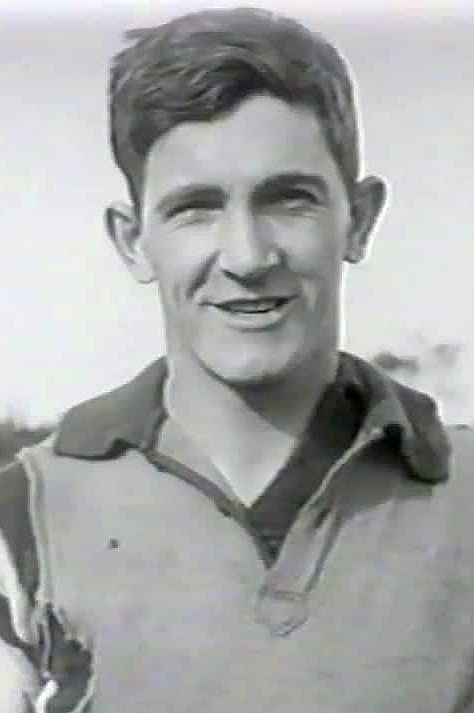
Allan Hopkins, the club's first Brownlow Medalist

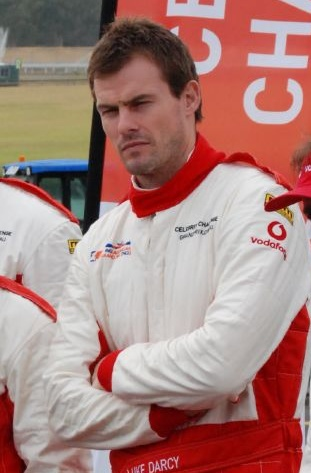
Leigh Matthews Trophy winner Luke Darcy

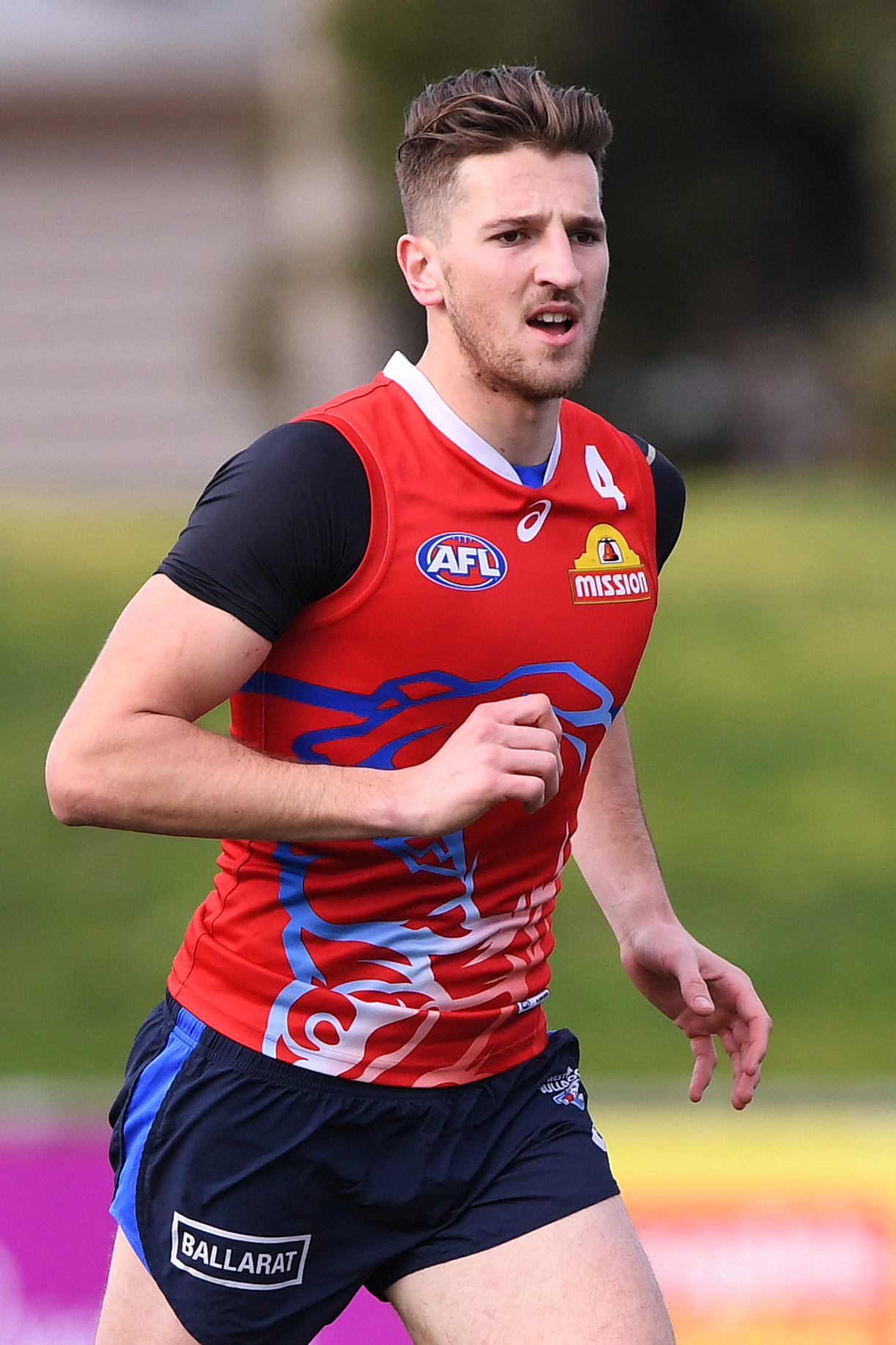
3x Leigh Matthews Trophy winner most successful in Bulldogs History Marcus Bontempelli

- Allan Hopkins (1930)
- Norman Ware (1941)
- Peter Box (1956)
- John Schultz (1960)
- Gary Dempsey (1975)
- Kelvin Templeton (1980)
- Brad Hardie (1985)
- Tony Liberatore (1990)
- Scott Wynd (1992)
- Adam Cooney (2008)

Note: Chris Grant gained the most votes in 1997 but was not eligible to win the award due to suspension

=== Norm Smith Medal winners ===
- Jason Johannisen (2016)

=== AFL Coaches Association Champion Player of The Year winners ===
- Marcus Bontempelli (2019)

=== Leigh Matthews Trophy winners ===
- Luke Darcy (2002, with Michael Voss)
- Marcus Bontempelli (2021, 2023, 2024)

=== Coleman Medal winners ===
- Jack Collins (1954, 1957)
- Kelvin Templeton (1978, 1979)
- Simon Beasley (1985)

=== All-Australians ===
Leading All-Australians

- Marcus Bontempelli 8x (2016, 2019, 2020, 2021(v.c), 2023(v.c), 2024(c), 2025, 2026)

Players who achieved All-Australian while playing for the Bulldogs:

- Ted Whitten (1958, 1961)
- John Schultz (1961)
- Ian Bryant (1966)
- David Thorpe (1972)
- Gary Dempsey (1972)
- Brian Royal (1981)
- Brad Hardie (1981)
- Michael McLean (1988)
- Tony McGuinness (1988)
- Scott Wynd (1992)
- Chris Grant (1997, 1998, 1999)
- Rohan Smith (1997, 2003)
- Paul Hudson (1998)
- Scott West (1998, 2000, 2004, 2005, 2006)
- Brad Johnson (1999, 2000, 2002, 2005, 2006(c), 2007)
- Nathan Brown (2001, 2002)
- Luke Darcy (2002)
- Dale Morris (2008)
- Adam Cooney (2008)
- Matthew Boyd (2009, 2011, 2016)
- Brian Lake (2009, 2010)
- Barry Hall (2010)
- Bob Murphy (2011, 2015(c))
- Will Minson (2013)
- Ryan Griffen (2013)
- Easton Wood (2015)
- Jake Stringer (2015)
- Marcus Bontempelli (2016, 2019, 2020, 2021(v.c), 2023(v.c), 2024(c), 2025, 2026)
- Jack Macrae (2019, 2020, 2021)
- Caleb Daniel (2020)
- Bailey Dale (2021, 2025)
- Tim English (2023)
- Adam Treloar (2024)
- Ed Richards (2025)

Coaches:

- Terry Wheeler (1992)
- Terry Wallace (1998)
- Luke Beveridge (2016)

=== Club awards ===
The Charles Sutton Medal is awarded annually to the Bulldogs player adjudged best and fairest by the coaches over an entire AFL season, including finals. Other club awards include the:

- Doug Hawkins Medal (awarded to the runner-up in the best and fairest count)
- Gary Dempsey Medal (awarded to third place in the best and fairest count)
- Scott West Most Courageous Player
- Chris Grant Best First Year Player
- Brad Johnson Best Team Player
- Tony Liberatore Most Improved Player
- John Schultz Community Award
- Victoria University Education Award
- John Van Groningen Domestique Award – Established in 2013, this award is voted on by the players and named after the former club chaplain who died suddenly from cancer in 2012 at the age of 52. The term "domestique" is taken from the role of a rider in the Tour de France whose job is to support the team and the leader, thus the award is given to the footballer who best plays a sacrificial role for the team.
- Footscray Best and Fairest (awarded to the fairest and best player in the VFL competition)
- Bulldogs Taskforce VFL Coaches Award
- Best in Finals – only awarded in years when Bulldogs play in the finals
- Simon Beasley Score Impact Award - Introduced in 2025, is awarded to the player with the highest combined total of goals and goal assists at the end of the season. The award is named in honour of former Bulldog Simon Beasley, the club's all-time leading goalkicker.

=== Current Club Award winners – 2026 season ===
- Charles Sutton Medal - Marcus Bontempelli

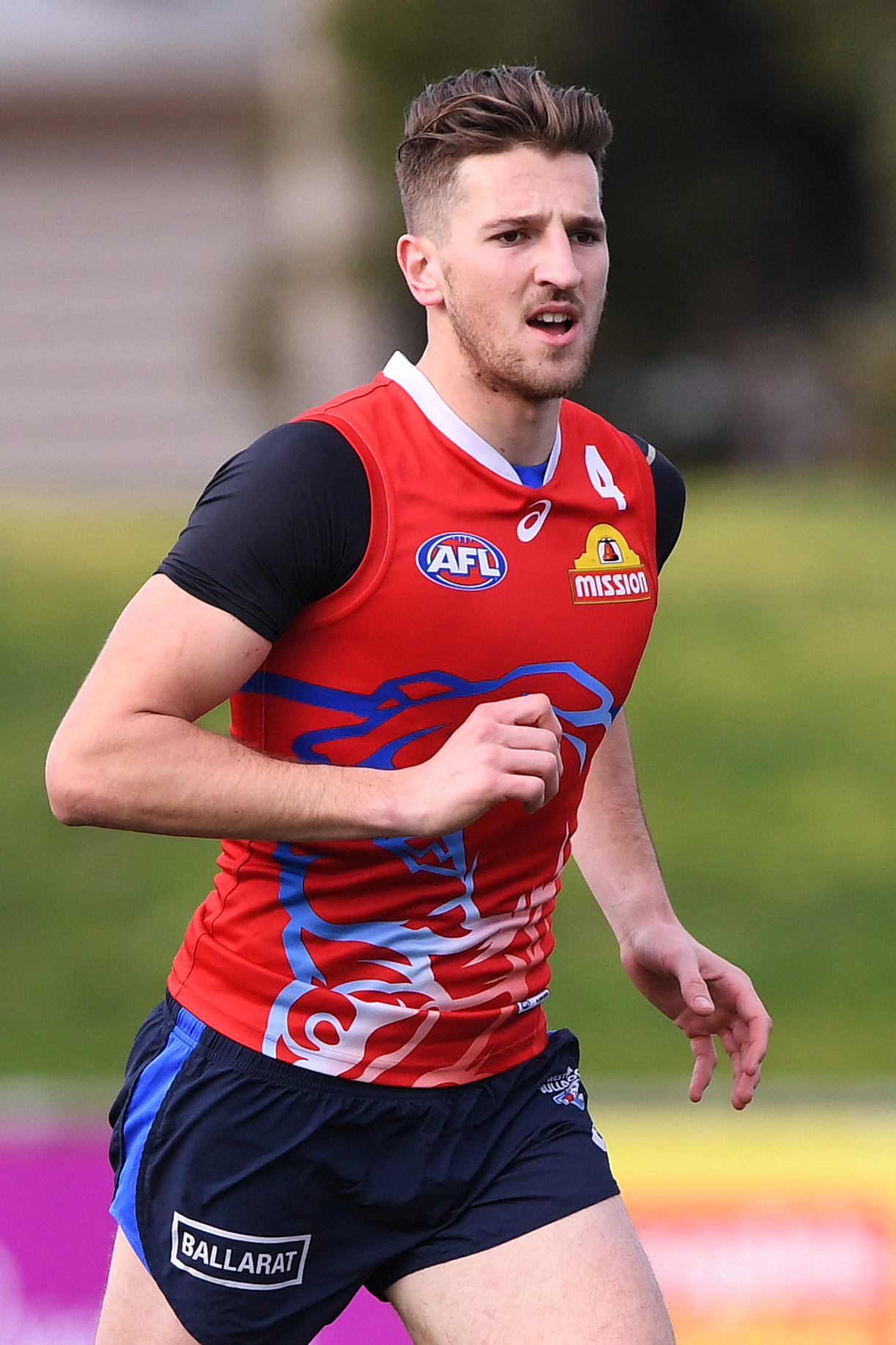
Current Charles Sutton Medalist 7x Winner Marcus Bontempelli

- Doug Hawkins Medal - Ed Richards
- Gary Dempsey Medal - James O'Donnell
- John Van Groningen Award - Marcus Bontempelli & Ed Richards
- Simon Beasley Score Impact Award - Aaron Naughton
- Tony Liberatore Most Improved Player - Arthur Jones
- Brad Johnson Best Team Player - Buku Khamis
- Scott West Most Courageous Player - Aaron Naughton
- Chris Grant Best First Year Player - Michael Sellwood
- Bruce Wilkinson & Ben Bradley Trainer Awards - Ed Richards & Ryan Gardner
- John Schultz Community Award - Tom Liberatore
- Best in Finals - Bailey Williams
- VFL Best & Fairest - Cooper Craig-Peters
- VFL Best & Fairest Runner up - Jack Billings

== Reserves team ==
Footscray Bulldogs

Names
- Full name: Footscray Football Club Limited

2026 season
- After finals: N/A
- Home-and-away season: 14th
- Leading goalkicker: Jack Billings (26)
- Footscray VFL Best & Fairest: Cooper Craig-Peters

Club details
- Founded: 1925, re-established in 2014 (as a reserves side)
- Competition: Victorian Football League
- Coach: Alex Johnson
- Captain: Daniel Orgill
- Premierships: VFL/AFL reserves (9): 1936; 1945; 1962; 1988; 1994; 1998; VFL (3): 2014; 2016; 2025
- Ground: Whitten Oval (10,000)

Uniforms
Home

The Footscray Bulldogs are the reserves team of the club, competing in the Victorian Football League.

=== History ===
In 1925, the year Footscray was admitted to the VFL, the club's reserves team began competing in the VFL reserves grade competition. The team won six premierships between 1936 and 1998, and were runners-up five times between 1938 and 1986.

Following the demise of AFL reserves competition at the end of the 1999 season, the reserves team was dissolved and a joint reserves affiliation was established with the Victorian Football League's two western clubs − Werribee and Williamstown − for the 2000 VFL season. From 2001 to 2007, the Bulldogs were solely aligned with Werribee, and from 2008 until 2013, solely aligned with Williamstown.

After a fourteen-year recess, the club re-established a stand-alone reserves team to compete in the Victorian Football League from 2014 onward. The new reserves team was formally named the Footscray Bulldogs, reflecting the club's original name prior to the decision to trade as the Western Bulldogs in the AFL from 1997. They play home games at Whitten Oval.

In its inaugural year, Footscray claimed the VFL premiership, defeating the Box Hill Hawks by 22 points in front of 23,816 at Docklands Stadium. Their second premiership came in 2016, defeating Casey by 31 points.

Footscray claimed the minor premiership in the COVID-19 pandemic-affected 2021 season.

In 2025, Footscray claimed its third VFL premiership, defeating Southport Sharks by 10 points at Princes Park with the final score 14.5 89 def 11.13 79. Cooper Craig-Peters was awarded the Norm Goss Memorial Medal after finishing with 28 disposal, 21 contested possessions, 8 clearances and a goal.

=== Individual records (VFL) ===
- Most games: Will Hayes − 96 (2014–2021)
- Most goals: Buku Khamis − 79 (2019–2025)

=== Season summaries ===
Footscray Bulldogs VFL honour roll
Season	Ladder	W–L–D	Finals	Coach	Captain(s)	VFL Best & Fairestist	Leading goalkicker
2024	6th	14–9–0	Preliminary Final	Stewart Edge	Josh Chatfield	Cooper Craig Peters	Dominic Bedendo (24)
2025	1st	15–3–0	Premiers	Stewart Edge	Dan Orgill	Billy Crofts	Will Lewis (38)
2026	14th	8-10-0	Did not Qualify	Alex Johnson	Dan Orgill	Cooper Craig-Peters	Jack Billings (26)

== AFL Women's team ==
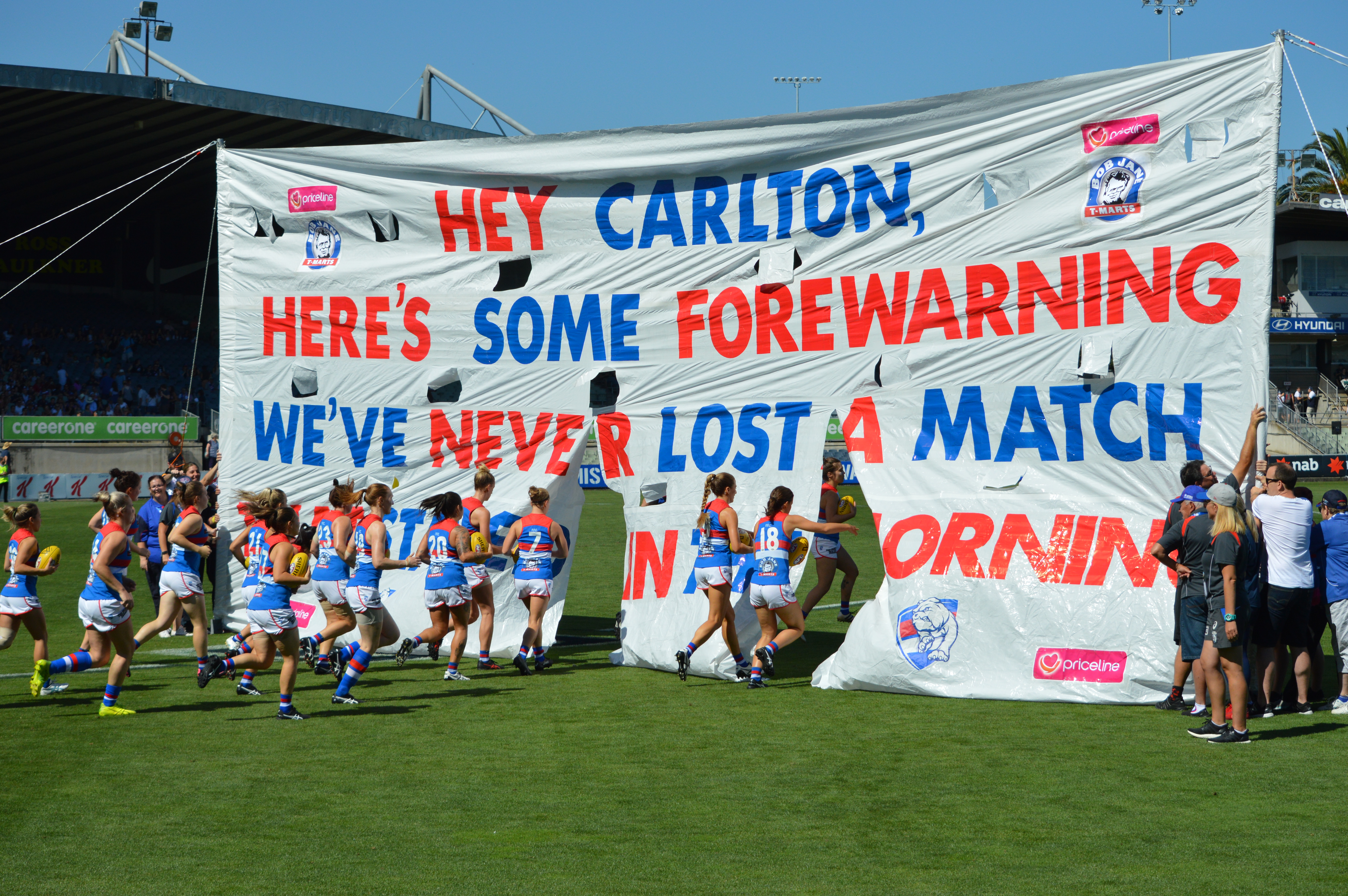
The team is led through the banner by vice-captain Ellie Blackburn in round 5, 2017

In June 2013, the Western Bulldogs fielded a women's football side against Melbourne in the first AFL-sanctioned women's exhibition match, held at the MCG. The two teams competed annually over the next three years for the Hampson-Hardeman Cup. In 2016, when the AFL announced plans for AFL Women's, an eight team national women's league competition, the Bulldogs were asked to submit an application for a license alongside other AFL clubs. The club was one of four Melbourne-based clubs to be granted a license that year.

The club's first players were marquee signings Katie Brennan and Ellie Blackburn. They were joined in August by priority player Emma Kearney who had previously worked in an off-field role at the club. In October, the club completed its inaugural playing list by adding 22 other senior listed and two rookie players in the league's draft and signing period. Former Monash Blues (VAFA) coach Paul Groves was named as the team's first head coach and football manager in August 2016. The following month, the club signed three-year sponsorship agreements with Priceline, Bob Jane T-Marts and Pancake Parlour.

The team's training base and administrative headquarters are located alongside the men's team at the Whitten Oval, and as part of the initial application, it plans to play home games at Whitten Oval, Eureka Stadium and Docklands Stadium. The club has also fielded a team in the second-tier VFL Women's league since 2016, the league's inaugural year.

In 2018, the Western Bulldogs and Carlton women's teams held the first Pride game in the AFLW, to celebrate gender diversity, promote inclusion for LGBTIQA+ players, and to help stamp out homophobia. After being joined by other clubs, in 2020, the first full AFLW Pride Round was held in 2021, supported by all 18 clubs in the league.

2018 AFL Women's Grand Final	G	B	Total
Western Bulldogs	4	3	27
Brisbane	3	3	21
Venue: Ikon Park	crowd: 7,083

=== Current squad ===
Western Bulldogs · AFL Women's personnel
Playing list		Inactive list	Coaching staff
1 Sarah Poustie; 2 Ellie Blackburn; 3 Isabella Grant; 4 Isabelle Pritchard (c); 5 Elaine Grigg; 7 Deanna Berry (c); 8 Dominique Carruthers; 9 Emma McDonald; 10 Jasmyn Smith; 11 Elle Bennetts; 12 Brooke Barwick; 13 Charlie O'Connor Moreira; 14 Louise Stephenson; 15 Sarah Hartwig; 16 Amaia Wain	17 Elisabeth Georgostathis; 18 Britney Gutknecht; 19 Heidi Woodley; 20 Cleo Buttifant; 21 Mikala Cann; 22 Mizuki Brothwell; 23 Jess Fitzgerald; 24 Keely Hardingham; 25 Ellie Gavalas; 26 Analee Mckee; 27 Lauren Ahrens; 28 Kaylee Kimber; 32 Mua Laloifi; 33 Alice Edmonds; 37 Rylie Wilcox	6 Maggie Gorham	Senior coach: Tamara Hyett; Assistant coaches: Callum Brown (back line); Peter Mercoulia (midfield); Andrew Killingsworth (forward line); Legend: (c) captain; Updated: 13 November 2026; Sources: Players, coaches

=== Season summaries ===
AFL Women's

Western Bulldogs AFLW honour roll
Season	Ladder	W–L–D	Finals	Coach	Captain(s)	Best and fairest	Leading goalkicker
2017	6th	2–5–0	Did not qualify	Paul Groves	Katie Brennan	Ellie Blackburn & Emma Kearney	Ellie Blackburn (6)
2018	1st	5–2–0	Premiers	Paul Groves	Katie Brennan	Emma Kearney (2)	Brooke Lochland (12)
2019	7th ^	2–5–0	Did not qualify	Paul Groves	Katie Brennan & Ellie Blackburn	Monique Conti	Katie Brennan (6)
2020	12th ^	1–5–0	Did not qualify	Nathan Burke	Ellie Blackburn	Isabel Huntington	Kirsten McLeod (5)
2021	8th	5–4–0	Did not qualify	Nathan Burke	Ellie Blackburn	Ellie Blackburn (2)	Isabel Huntington (12)
2022 (S6)	7th	4–5–1	Did not qualify	Nathan Burke	Ellie Blackburn	Ellie Blackburn (3)/Kirsty Lamb	Bonnie Toogood (10)
2022 (S7)	7th	7–3–0	Elimination final	Nathan Burke	Ellie Blackburn	Ellie Blackburn (4)	Gabby Newton (8)
2023	18th	1–9–0	Did not qualify	Nathan Burke	Ellie Blackburn	Ellie Blackburn (5)	Kirsty Lamb (7)
2024	12th	4–7–0	Did not qualify	Tamara Hyett	Ellie Blackburn/Deanna Berry	Isabelle Pritchard	Sarah Hartwig (8)
2025	12th	5–7–0	Did not qualify	Tamara Hyett	Deanna Berry	Ellie Blackburn (6)	Emma McDonald (11)

^ Denotes the ladder was split into two conferences. Figure refers to the club's overall finishing position that season.

VFL Women's

Western Bulldogs VFLW honour roll
Season	Final position	Coach	Captain	Best and fairest	Leading goalkicker
2016	6th	Debbie Lee	Bree White	Bree White	Alexandra Quigley (25)
2017	6th	Debbie Lee	Bree White	Bree White	Alyssa Mifsud (12)
2018	6th	Debbie Lee	None	Naomi Ferres	Alyssa Mifsud (7)
2019	Runners-up	Sean Kavanagh	Mickayla Ward	Ellie Gavalas	Danielle Marshall & Mickayla Ward (10)
2020	Season cancelled due to the COVID-19 pandemic				
2021	7th	Sean Kavanagh	Riley Christgoergl	Simone Ruedin	Nell Morris-Dalton/Danielle Marshall/Gemma Lagiola/Mary Sandral (5)
2022	12th	Kirby Bentley	Riley Christgoergl	Eliza Vale	Mary Sandral (7)
2023	11th	Rhys Cahir	Mary Sandral	Jorja Borg/Dominique Carbone	Jaimi Tabb/Imahra Cameron (8)
2024	2nd	Rhys Cahir	Dominique Carbone	Dominique Carbone	Jaimi Tabb (14)
2025	9th	Rhys Cahir	Steph Asciak	Jaimi Tabb	Brianna McFarlane (13)

Sources: Club historical data and VFLW stats

== Bibliography ==
- Flanagan, Martin (1994). Southern Sky, Western Oval. McPhee Gribble. ISBN 0-86914-331-X.
- Lack, John; McConville, Chris; Small, Michael; Wright, Damien (1996). A History of the Footscray Football Club: Unleashed. Aus-Sport Enterprises Pty Ltd. ISBN 0-646-26215-7.
- Nicholson, Matthew (August 2002). "Fightback: The Footscray Football Club's Fight to Survive in 1989" (PDF). Print Media Representation of Crisis Events in Australian Football (PhD). Victoria University.

== See also ==
- Australian Football League
- Footscray, Victoria
- List of Western Bulldogs/Footscray players
