= Don McKenzie (footballer, born 1942) =

Australian rules footballer and coach

Personal information
- Born: 22 July 1942 (age 84)
- Original team: Spotswood
- Height: 180 cm (5 ft 11 in)
- Weight: 73 kg (161 lb)

Playing career^{1}
Years	Club	Games (Goals)
1962–1970	Footscray	137 (128)

Coaching career
Years	Club	Games (W–L–D)
1978–1979, 1982	Footscray	44 (14–29–1)
- ^{1} Playing statistics correct to the end of 1970.

Don McKenzie (born 22 July 1942) is a former Australian rules footballer who played with Footscray in the Victorian Football League (VFL) during the 1960s.

McKenzie played 137 games for Footscray but didn't get to play finals football. He kicked 128 goals with a best season tally coming in 1969 when he kicked 32 goals. McKenzie played his last game in 1970 before leaving Footscray and in 1972 won the J. J. Liston Trophy while captaining and coaching Sunshine in the Victorian Football Association. During the 1978 VFL season he took over coaching duties at Footscray from Bill Goggin and remained coach until the end of 1979.
