= Joe Kelly (footballer, born 1907) =

Australian rules footballer, born 1907

Personal information
- Born: 7 June 1907
- Died: 17 June 1998 (aged 91)
- Original team: Old Xaverians
- Height: 175 cm (5 ft 9 in)
- Weight: 74 kg (163 lb)

Playing career^{1}
Years	Club	Games (Goals)
1926–1934	Carlton	137 (15)

Coaching career
Years	Club	Games (W–L–D)
1937–1940	Footscray	69 (29–40–0)
1941–1944	South Melbourne	63 (31–32–0)
Total		132 (60–72–0)
- ^{1} Playing statistics correct to the end of 1944.

Joe Kelly (7 June 1907 – 17 June 1998) was an Australian rules footballer who played with Carlton in the Victorian Football League before becoming a coach.

Kelly was a left footed wingman with considerable pace and played 137 games for Carlton between 1926 and 1934. He began his coaching career in 1937 with Footscray where he took over from Syd Coventry mid-season. The following year he led the club to their first ever finals appearance, finishing the home and away season in third position. He moved to South Melbourne in 1941 and in 1942 led them all the way to the Preliminary Final where they went down to eventual premiers Essendon.
