= Roy Evans (Australian footballer) =

Australian rules footballer

Personal information
- Full name: Roy Henry Evans
- Born: 10 November 1910; South Melbourne, Victoria
- Died: 17 July 1987 (aged 76); Prahran, Victoria
- Original team: Yarraville (VFA)
- Height: 178 cm (5 ft 10 in)
- Weight: 69 kg (152 lb)

Playing career^{1}
Years	Club	Games (Goals)
1936–1939	Footscray	49 (15)
- ^{1} Playing statistics correct to the end of 1939.

Roy Henry Evans (10 November 1910 – 17 July 1987) was an Australian rules footballer who played for Footscray in the Victorian Football League (VFL) during the late 1930s. Evans was a member of Victorian Football Association (VFA) club Yarraville's inaugural premiership side in 1935 before he was recruited by Footscray the following season. He played as both a wingman and centreman during his 49-game stint with Footscray, captaining them to their first ever finals campaign in 1938.
