= Jim Gallagher (footballer) =

Australian rules footballer

Personal information
- Born: 16 March 1931 (age 95)
- Original teams: Tallangatta, Assumption College
- Height: 180 cm (5 ft 11 in)
- Weight: 80 kg (176 lb)

Playing career^{1}
Years	Club	Games (Goals)
1951–1960	Footscray	151 (0)
- ^{1} Playing statistics correct to the end of 1960.

Career highlights
- VFL premiership player: 1954; Footscray Team of the Century

Jim Gallagher (born 16 March 1931) is a former Australian rules footballer who played with Footscray in the Victorian Football League (VFL) during the 1950s.

Originally from Tallangatta, Gallagher was recruited via Assumption College, Kilmore where he won their best and fairest award in 1947 and 1948.

He was a member of Footscray's 1954 premiership winning side, playing as a half back flanker. Despite appearing 151 times for the Bulldogs in the VFL he never once kicked a goal.

Gallagher was a VFL interstate representative and was named in the interchange bench in Footscray's official 'Team of the Century'.
