= Ray Walker (Australian rules footballer) =

Australian rules footballer

Personal information
- Born: 18 December 1941 (age 84)
- Original team: Braybrook (FDFL)
- Height: 175 cm (5 ft 9 in)
- Weight: 79 kg (174 lb)
- Position: Back pocket

Playing career^{1}
Years	Club	Games (Goals)
1959–1965	Footscray	73 (1)
1965–1968	Burnie	
1969–1970	Penguin	
- ^{1} Playing statistics correct to the end of 1970.

Career highlights
- Charles Sutton Medal: 1963; Victorian state representative: 1960, 1963; Burnie premiership captain-coach: 1966; Tasmanian representative at the 1966 Hobart Carnival; Lefroy Medalist, Tasmania v Victoria 1967; Western Bulldogs (Footscray) life member

Ray Walker (born 18 December 1941) is a former Australian rules footballer who played in the Victorian Football League (VFL).

Walker played with Footscray as a back pocket.

Walker played 72 games for Footscray (1959–65). He won Footscray's 1963 best and fairest award and was selected to represent Victoria.

In 1966 Walker moved to Tasmania to pursue coaching. He was a premiership captain coach during his six years in Tasmania.

From 1972 to 1987 Walker worked as a commentator for Channel 9 and on ABC Radio.

His football credentials include five years (1981–85) as a VFL state selector and three years as chairman of selectors for the Footscray Football Club. Walker was awarded life membership of the club in 1999.

Walker is a current Bulldogs hall of fame selector.

Walker is the uncle of current AFL Women's (AFLW) player Lauren Arnell
