= Harry Hickey =

Australian rules footballer, born 1917

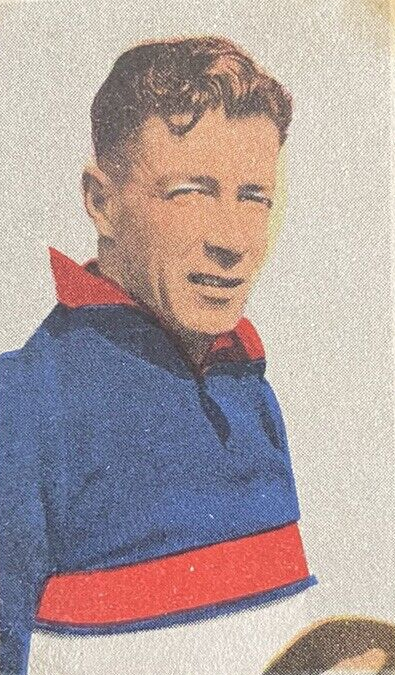
- Hickey in 1948

Personal information
- Full name: Henry Robert Hickey
- Born: 19 July 1917; Footscray, Victoria
- Died: 14 September 1999 (aged 82)
- Original team: South Footscray
- Height: 175 cm (5 ft 9 in)
- Weight: 76 kg (168 lb)
- Position: wing

Playing career^{1}
Years	Club	Games (Goals)
1937–1948	Footscray	174 (169)
- ^{1} Playing statistics correct to the end of 1948.

Career highlights
- 3× McCarthy trophy/Con Curtain trophy: 1939, 1945, 1948; Footscray captain: 1947; Footscray FC: Team of the Century

Henry Robert Hickey (19 July 1917 – 14 September 1999) was an Australian rules footballer who played with the Footscray Bulldogs in the Victorian Football League. He began his career as a rover and half forward flanker before he moved into the centre during the 1939 season. He would go on to win their best and fairest 3 times, including one in his final season.

Hickey famously kicked a behind after the final bell in Footscray's match against Carlton in the final round of the 1944 VFL season, which saw Footscray win the game by one point, and replace Carlton for the last place in that season's final four.

Hickey also played representative football for Victoria.

After retiring from the VFL, he was captain-coach of Rochester in the Bendigo Football League for four years and won the 1949 Bendigo Football League RSL best and fairest award. Hickey was still playing very good football at Rochester in 1955.

Hickey was named on the wing in Footscray's Team of the Century.
