= Geoff Jennings =

Australian rules footballer

Personal information
- Born: 4 April 1955 (age 71)
- Original team: Traralgon (LVFL)
- Height: 178 cm (5 ft 10 in)
- Weight: 76 kg (168 lb)

Playing career^{1}
Years	Club	Games (Goals)
1974–1983	Footscray	137 (136)
- ^{1} Playing statistics correct to the end of 1983.

Geoff Jennings (born 4 April 1955) is a former Australian rules footballer who played with Footscray in the VFL.

A rover, Jennings first played with Footscray in 1974. He represented Victoria at interstate football 3 times during his career and captained Footscray from 1979 to 1981. Now after retirement, Geoff Jennings has gone onto become a teacher at several notable school and his current being Glenala State High School.
