= Laurie Sandilands =

Australian rules footballer (born 1949)

Personal information
- Full name: John Lawrence Sandilands
- Born: 30 April 1949 (age 77); Seddon, Victoria
- Original team: West Footscray (FDFL)
- Height: 188 cm (6 ft 2 in)
- Weight: 87 kg (192 lb)

Playing career^{1}
Years	Club	Games (Goals)
1966–1977	Footscray	160 (228)
1978	Collingwood	4 (6)
Total		164 (234)
- ^{1} Playing statistics correct to the end of 1978.

John Lawrence Sandilands (born 30 April 1949), known professionally as Laurie, is a former Australian rules footballer who played for Footscray in the Victorian Football League (VFL).

He made his senior debut in 1966, after being recruited from a local Footscray District Football League club, the West Footscray Roosters. He played briefly in Footscray's Under 19's squad, before making his senior debut.

Sandilands was a key position forward and topped Footscray's goalkicking every season from 1972 to 1975. His best season tally was 50 goals which he kicked in 1974. Sandilands also captained the club that season and he remained in charge for a further two seasons. In 1978, he moved to Collingwood and played with the Magpies for one season, retiring after three games.
