= Les Chapple =

Australian rules footballer

Personal information
- Full name: Leslie Richard Chapple
- Born: 9 November 1898; Mitiamo, Victoria
- Died: 23 January 1982 (aged 83); Footscray, Victoria
- Original team: Eaglehawk (Bendigo FL)

Playing career^{1}
Years	Club	Games (Goals)
1926–1928	Footscray	32 (82)
- ^{1} Playing statistics correct to the end of 1928.

Leslie Richard Chapple (9 November 1898 – 23 January 1982) was an Australian rules footballer who played with Footscray in the Victorian Football League (VFL).

Chapple was already 27 when he began his Footscray career, having previously played for Eaglehawk in the Bendigo Football League, before moving to Melbourne for work reasons. He was one of three Footscray players to appear in all 18 games of the 1926 VFL season and was their joint leading goal-kicker with 42 goals, sharing the honours with Allan Hopkins. A representative of the Victoria "B" side on two occasions, Chapple was the leading goal-kicker outright in 1927, kicking 32 goals. He was cleared to Yarraville in 1928.
