= Charlie Page =

Australian rules footballer

Personal information
- Full name: Charles Walter Page
- Born: 2 March 1917; Newport, Victoria
- Died: 13 October 2010 (aged 93)
- Original team: Spotswood United
- Height: 180 cm (5 ft 11 in)
- Weight: 80 kg (176 lb)
- Position: Forward

Playing career^{1}
Years	Club	Games (Goals)
1938–1941	Footscray	43 (113)
- ^{1} Playing statistics correct to the end of 1941.

Charles Walter Page (2 March 1917 – 13 October 2010) was an Australian rules footballer who played with Footscray in the Victorian Football League (VFL).

Page grew up in Newport and played for Spotswood United before joining Footscray. He kicked three goals on his Footscray debut in 1938, his only game of the year. In both 1939 and 1940, Page topped Footscray's goal-kicking, with 31 and 52 goals respectively. He kicked nine goals against Richmond in the opening round of the 1940 VFL season, which remained his personal best. His career ended prematurely due to the war.
