= 1898 VFA season =

1898 premiership season
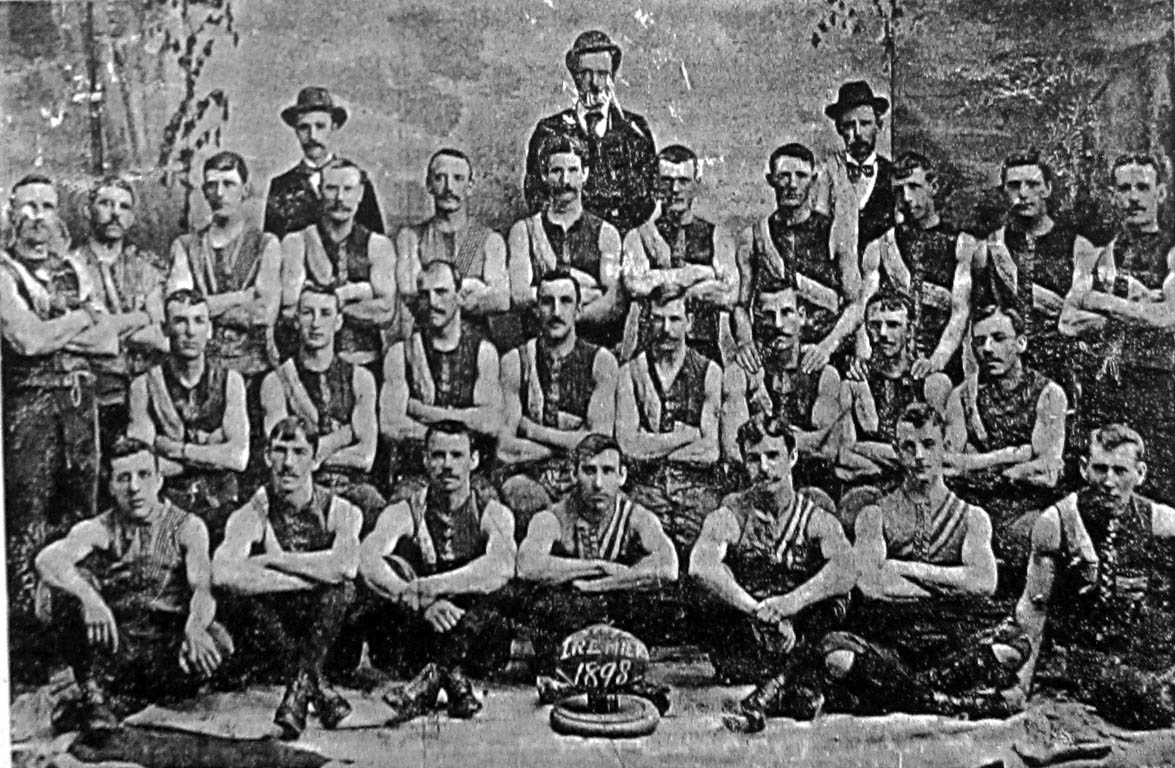
- Footscray, premiers
- Teams: 6
- Premiers: Footscray; 1st premiership

The 1898 Victorian Football Association season was the 22nd season of the Australian rules football competition. The premiership was won by the Footscray Football Club; it was the first premiership in the club's history, and the first in a sequence of three premierships won consecutively from 1898 to 1900.

== Ladder ==
The 1898 VFA season was played in two parts.

- In the initial rounds, each team played fifteen matches.
- After the first round, the bottom two teams were eliminated, and each of the top four played an additional two matches.
- The premiership was then to be decided by the best overall record for the season; in the event of a tie, a playoff match would have been held.

The result of this was that while Richmond had qualified for the "finals" stage, it had no chance of winning the premiership as it began this stage too far behind Footscray to win.

1898 VFA ladder
Pos	Team	Pld	W	L	D	PF	PA	Pts
1	Footscray (P)	17	13	4	0	670	502	52
2	North Melbourne	17	12	5	0	823	686	48
3	Port Melbourne	17	11	6	0	931	492	44
4	Richmond	17	8	9	0	727	639	32
5	Williamstown	15	5	10	0	458	523	20
6	Brunswick	15	0	15	0	318	1085	0

Rules for classification: 1) points; 2) percentage; 3) number of points for.
(P) Premiers

=== Port Melbourne protest ===
Following the initial round of fifteen matches, Port Melbourne lodged a protest, seeking to overturn the results of two of its losses against North Melbourne during the season, on the grounds that North Melbourne had fielded former Fitzroy player Kelly without the proper clearance; and that Dick Houston, North Melbourne's captain and caretaker of the North Melbourne ground, had played without a caretaker's permit – a special requirement which ground caretakers were required to obtain in order to play. The Argus reported that during its initial discussion, the Association appeared likely to uphold Port Melbourne's protests, which would have ultimately drawn Port Melbourne level with Footscray for first place and therefore forced a playoff match for the premiership. Then, however, North Melbourne was able to successfully argue that Port Melbourne's protests were informal due to a procedural irregularity: namely that Port Melbourne had not deposited three guineas to the Association for each point of protest. As such, Port Melbourne's protests were dismissed on 23 September by a majority of 6–4 and Footscray was confirmed to be premiers.

== Notable events ==
- In a match in Port Melbourne on 3 September, the visiting Richmond team was subjected to such rough treatment and threats from Port Melbourne players in the first half that only seven Richmond players opted to return to the field after half-time; Richmond ultimately abandoned the game altogether at three-quarter time.

== See also ==
- Victorian Football Association/Victorian Football League History (1877-2008)
- List of VFA/VFL Premiers (1877-2007)
- History of Australian rules football in Victoria (1853-1900)
