= List of Brownlow Medal winners =

The Brownlow Medal (formally the Charles Brownlow Trophy) is an individual award given to the player judged fairest and best in the Australian Football League (AFL) during the regular season. Determined by votes cast by the officiating umpires after each game, it is considered the highest honour for individual players in the AFL.

The medal has been awarded every year since 1924, with the exception of 1942–1945 due to World War II. As of 2026, the Brownlow Medal has been awarded 113 times to 92 different players in 98 medal counts.

== Winners by season ==
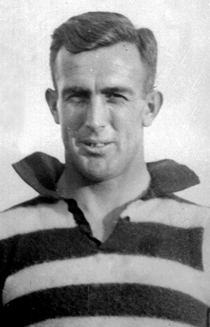
Edward Greeves Jr., also known as Carji Greeves, the inaugural Brownlow Medallist

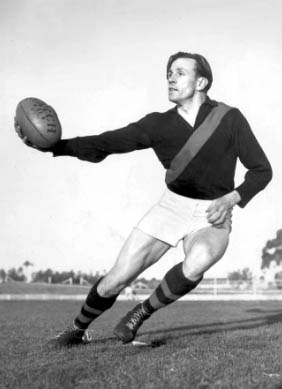
Dick Reynolds, 1934, 1937, and 1938 Brownlow Medallist.

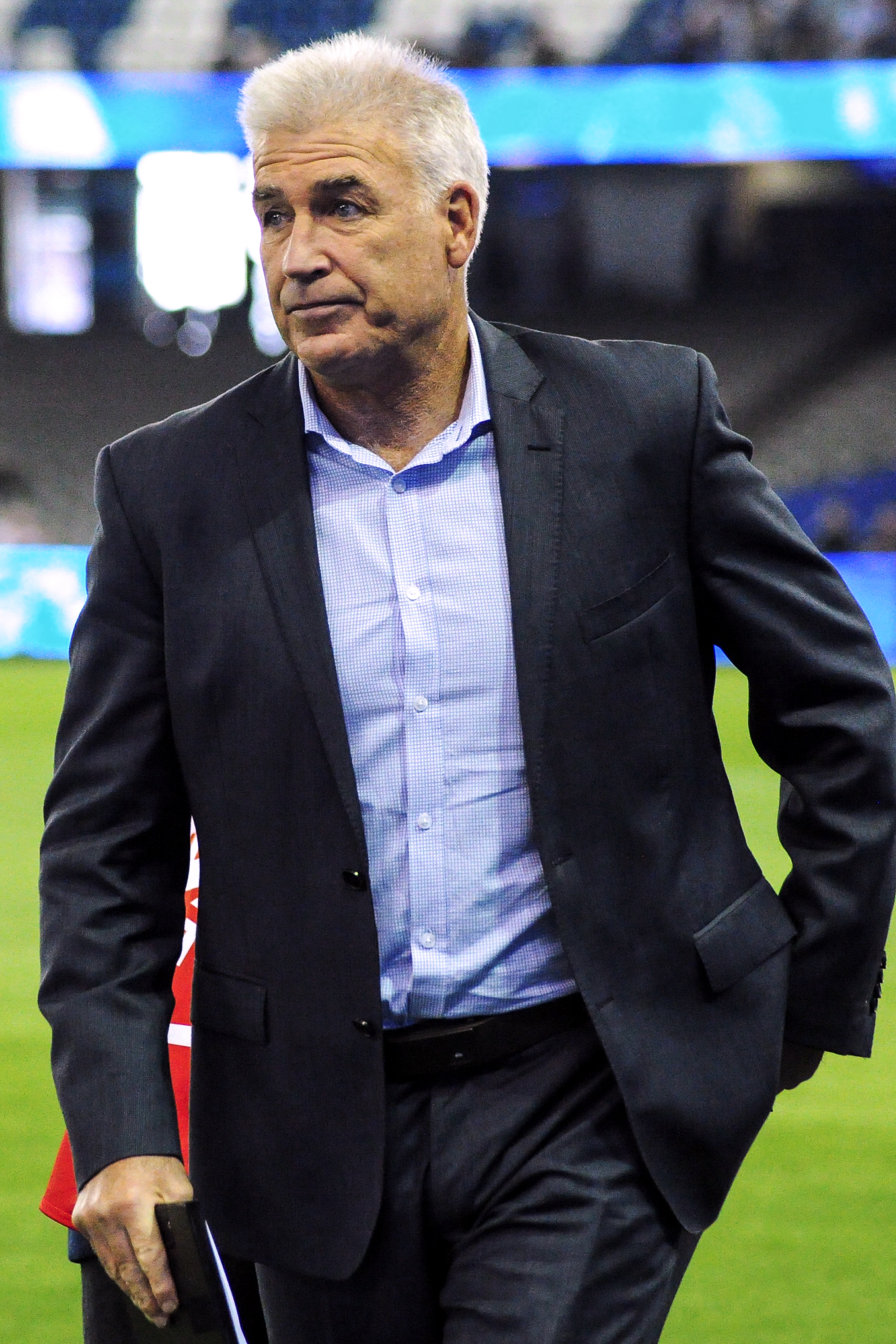
Gerard Healy, 1988 Brownlow Medallist

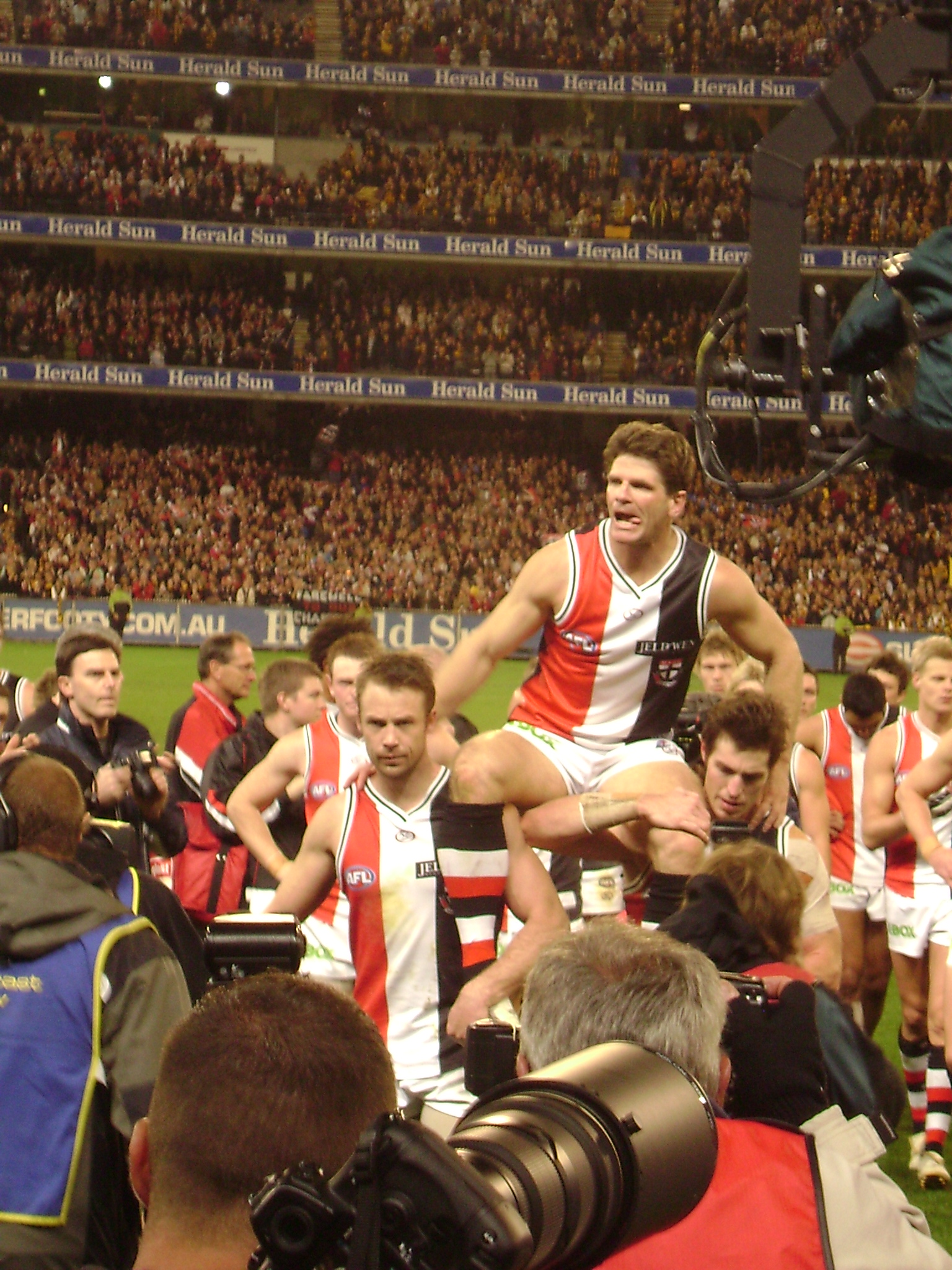
Robert Harvey, 1997 and 1998 Brownlow Medallist

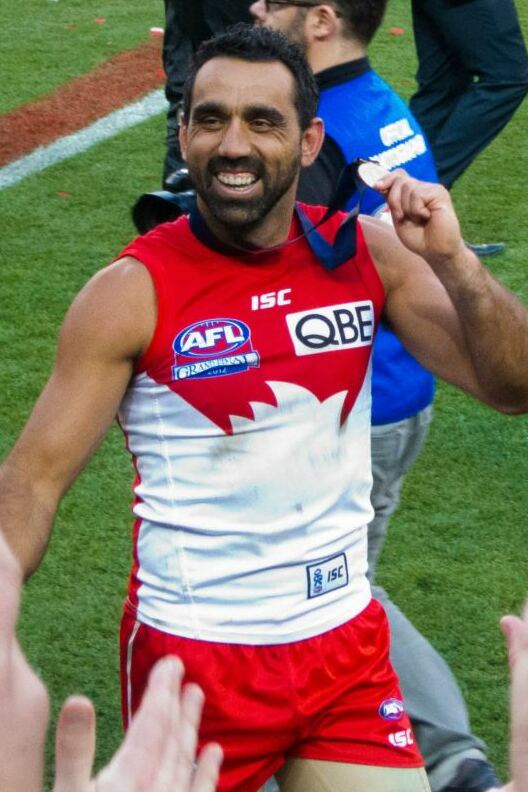
Adam Goodes, 2003 and 2006 Brownlow Medallist

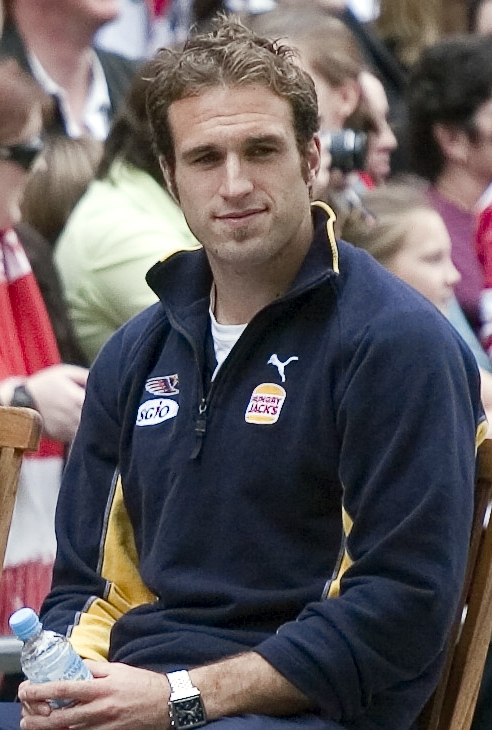
Chris Judd, 2004 and 2010 Brownlow Medallist

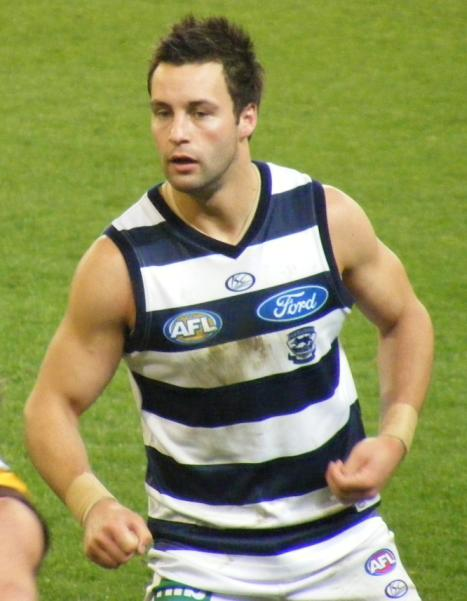
Jimmy Bartel, 2007 Brownlow Medallist

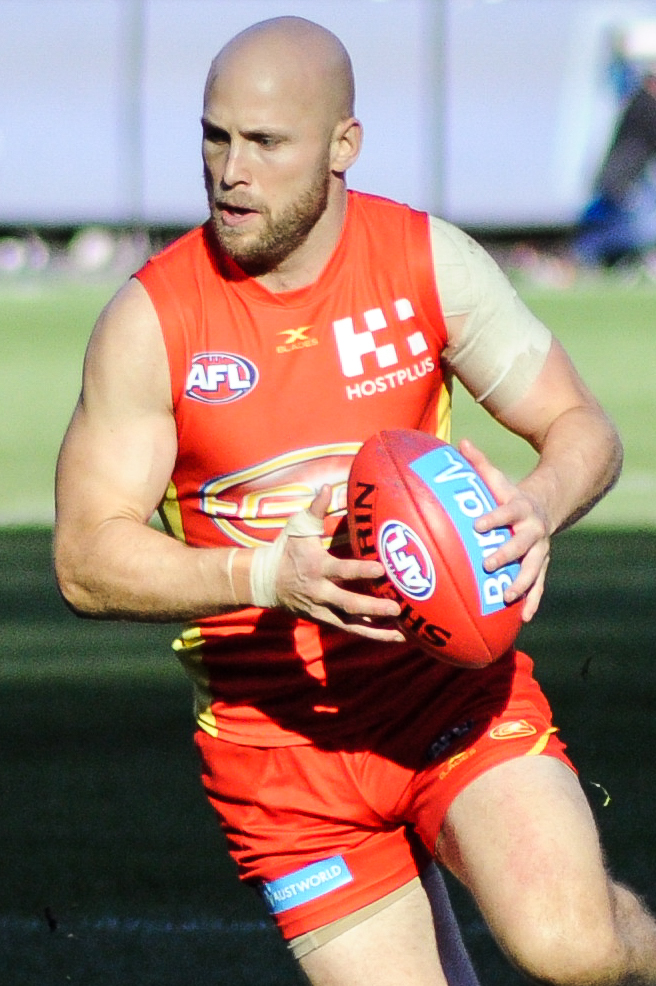
Gary Ablett Jr., 2009 and 2013 Brownlow Medallist

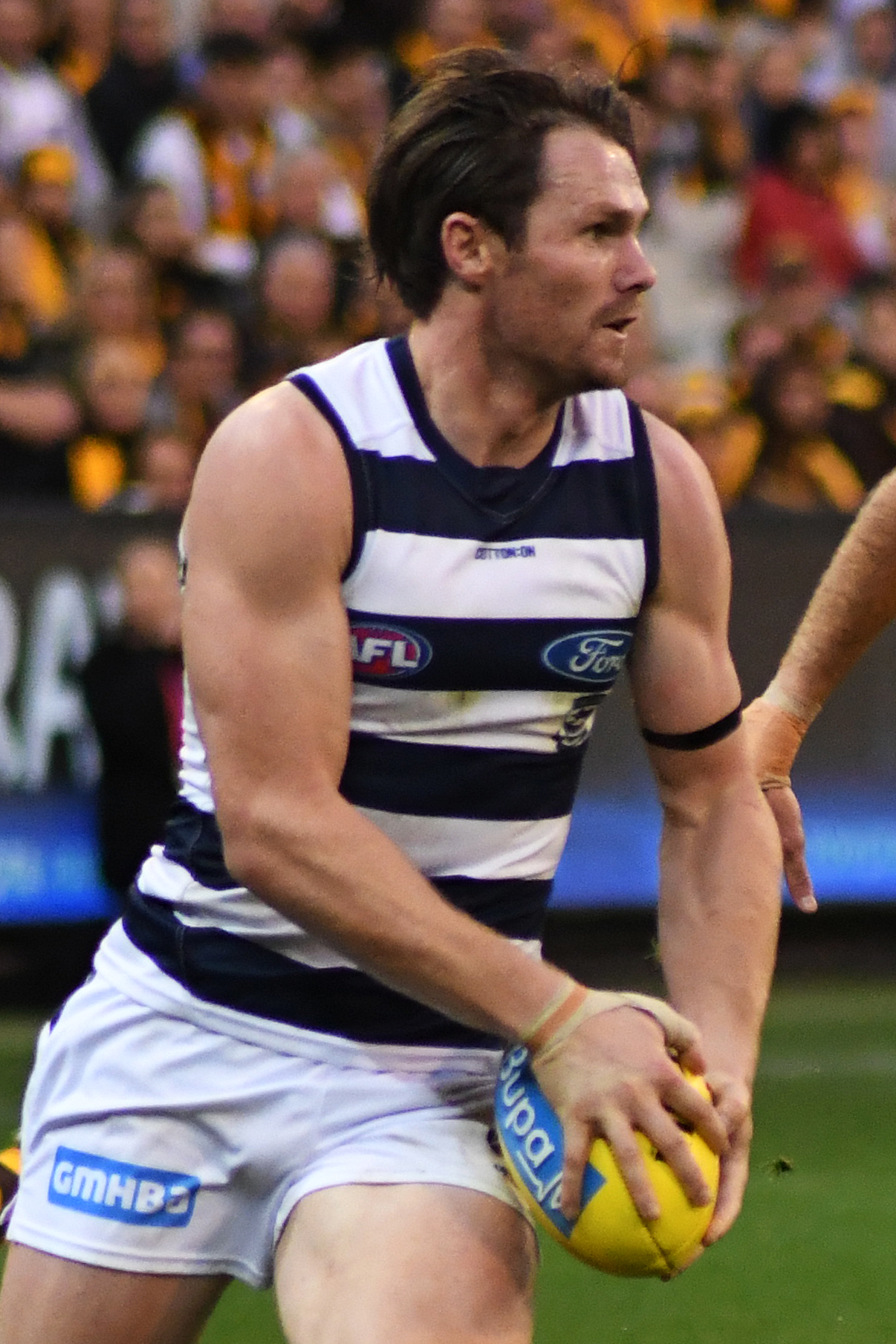
Patrick Dangerfield, 2016 Brownlow Medallist

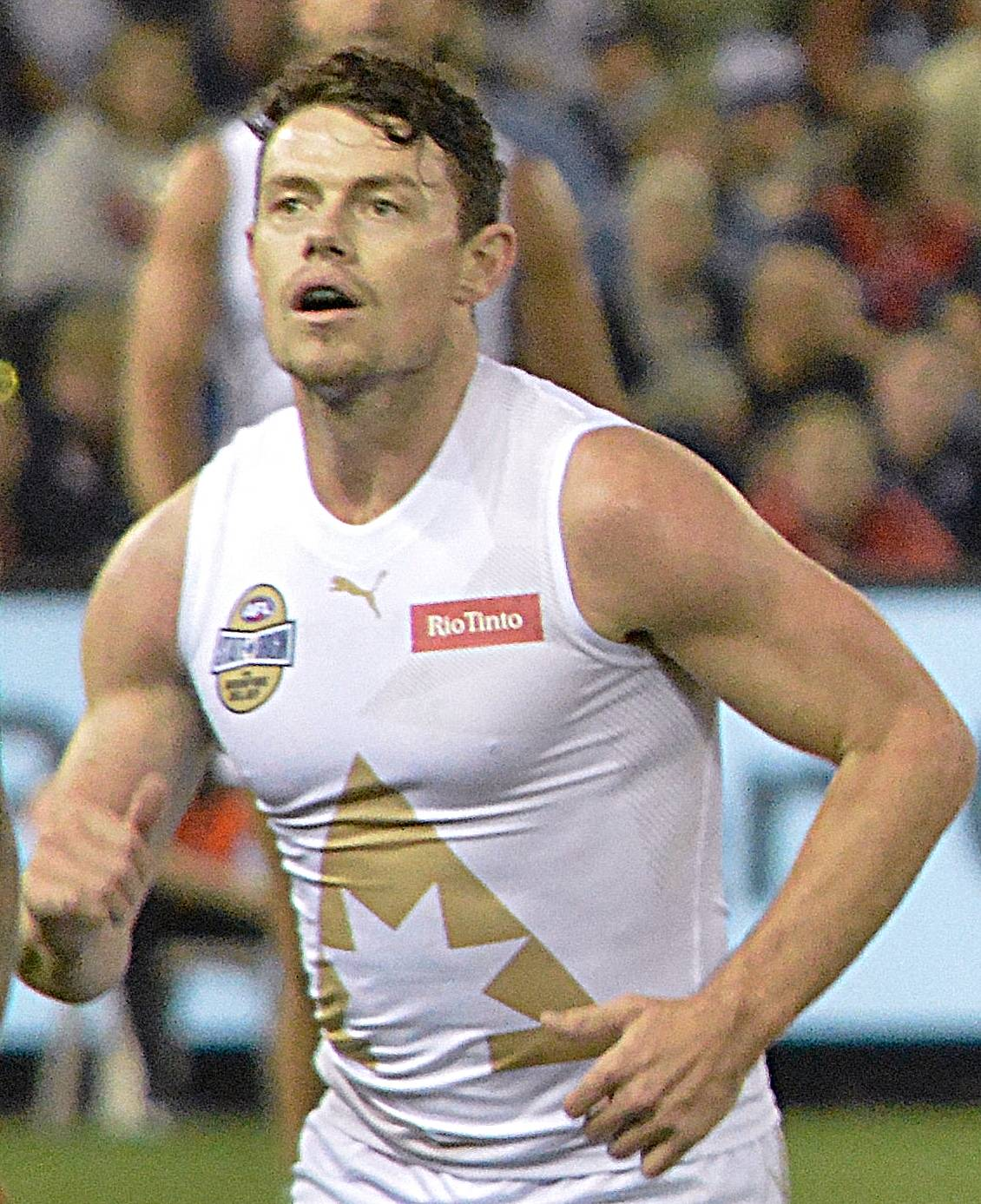
Lachie Neale, 2020 and 2023 Brownlow Medallist

Voting systems:

- 1924–1930 – Single umpire awards 1 vote to best on ground only
- 1931–1975 – Single umpire awards 3–2–1 votes to best three on ground
- 1976–1977 – Two umpires separately award 3–2–1 votes to best three on ground
- 1978–present – Umpiring team collectively awards 3–2–1 votes to best three on ground

Until 1980, a countback system was used to determine the winner in the event of a tie. In 1930, Judkins was awarded the medal because he had played in the fewest games; and from 1931 to 1980, the winner was the player with the most three-vote games. In 1980, the countback system was removed, and in the event of a tie, players have been considered joint winners. In 1989, the countback was retroactively removed from all previous counts, and all players who had previously lost on countback were considered joint winners.

| Year | Player | Team | Votes | Matches |
|---|---|---|---|---|
| 1924 | Edward Greeves Jr. | Geelong | 7 | 16 |
| 1925 | Colin Watson | St Kilda | 9 | 17 |
| 1926 | Ivor Warne-Smith (1/2) | Melbourne | 9 | 18 |
| 1927 | Syd Coventry | Collingwood | 7 | 18 |
| 1928 | Ivor Warne-Smith (2/2) | Melbourne | 8 | 18 |
| 1929 | Albert Collier | Collingwood | 6 | 16 |
| 1930 | Harry Collier (Note: Medal was awarded retrospectively, as a countback rule was applied until 1980.) | Collingwood | 4 | 18 |
| 1930 | Allan Hopkins | Footscray | 4 | 18 |
| 1930 | Stan Judkins | Richmond | 4 | 18 |
| 1931 | Haydn Bunton Sr. (1/3) | Fitzroy | 26 | 18 |
| 1932 | Haydn Bunton Sr. (2/3) | Fitzroy | 23 | 18 |
| 1933 | Wilfred "Chicken" Smallhorn | Fitzroy | 18 | 18 |
| 1934 | Dick Reynolds (1/3) | Essendon | 19 | 18 |
| 1935 | Haydn Bunton Sr. (3/3) | Fitzroy | 24 | 18 |
| 1936 | Denis Ryan | Fitzroy | 26 | 18 |
| 1937 | Dick Reynolds (2/3) | Essendon | 27 | 18 |
| 1938 | Dick Reynolds (3/3) | Essendon | 18 | 18 |
| 1939 | Marcus Whelan | Collingwood | 23 | 18 |
| 1940 (Note: No winner was declared in 1940: Des Fothergill and Herbie Matthews being recognised retrospectively as joint winners in 1989 after having initially received replica medals.) | Des Fothergill | Collingwood | 32 | 18 |
| 1940 | Herbie Matthews | South Melbourne | 32 | 18 |
| 1941 | Norman Ware | Footscray | 23 | 18 |
| 1942 | No medal awarded due to World War II | | | |
| 1943 | No medal awarded due to World War II | | | |
| 1944 | No medal awarded due to World War II | | | |
| 1945 | No medal awarded due to World War II | | | |
| 1946 | Don Cordner | Melbourne | 20 | 19 |
| 1947 | Bert Deacon | Carlton | 20 | 19 |
| 1948 | Bill Morris | Richmond | 24 | 19 |
| 1949 | Col Austen | Hawthorn | 23 | 19 |
| 1949 | Ron Clegg | South Melbourne | 23 | 19 |
| 1950 | Allan Ruthven | Fitzroy | 21 | 18 |
| 1951 | Bernie Smith | Geelong | 23 | 18 |
| 1952 | Roy Wright (1/2) | Richmond | 21 | 19 |
| 1952 | Bill Hutchison (1/2) | Essendon | 21 | 19 |
| 1953 | Bill Hutchison (2/2) | Essendon | 26 | 18 |
| 1954 | Roy Wright (2/2) | Richmond | 29 | 18 |
| 1955 | Fred Goldsmith | South Melbourne | 21 | 18 |
| 1956 | Peter Box | Footscray | 22 | 18 |
| 1957 | Brian Gleeson | St Kilda | 24 | 18 |
| 1958 | Neil Roberts | St Kilda | 20 | 18 |
| 1959 | Verdun Howell | St Kilda | 20 | 18 |
| 1959 | Bob Skilton (1/3) | South Melbourne | 20 | 18 |
| 1960 | John Schultz | Footscray | 20 | 18 |
| 1961 | John James | Carlton | 21 | 18 |
| 1962 | Alistair Lord | Geelong | 28 | 18 |
| 1963 | Bob Skilton (2/3) | South Melbourne | 20 | 18 |
| 1964 | Gordon Collis | Carlton | 27 | 18 |
| 1965 | Noel Teasdale | North Melbourne | 20 | 18 |
| 1965 | Ian Stewart (1/3) | St Kilda | 20 | 18 |
| 1966 | Ian Stewart (2/3) | St Kilda | 21 | 18 |
| 1967 | Ross Smith | St Kilda | 24 | 18 |
| 1968 | Bob Skilton (3/3) | South Melbourne | 24 | 20 |
| 1969 | Kevin Murray | Fitzroy | 19 | 20 |
| 1970 | Peter Bedford | South Melbourne | 25 | 22 |
| 1971 | Ian Stewart (3/3) | Richmond | 21 | 22 |
| 1972 | Len Thompson | Collingwood | 25 | 22 |
| 1973 | Keith Greig (1/2) | North Melbourne | 27 | 22 |
| 1974 | Keith Greig (2/2) | North Melbourne | 27 | 22 |
| 1975 | Gary Dempsey | Footscray | 20 | 22 |
| 1976 | Graham Moss | Essendon | 48 (Note: The voting system in 1976 and 1977 had both field umpires awarding votes, resulting in higher vote tallies than in other years.) | 22 |
| 1977 | Graham Teasdale | South Melbourne | 59 | 22 |
| 1978 | Malcolm Blight | North Melbourne | 22 | 22 |
| 1979 | Peter Moore (1/2) | Collingwood | 22 | 22 |
| 1980 | Kelvin Templeton | Footscray | 23 | 22 |
| 1981 | Bernie Quinlan | Fitzroy | 22 | 22 |
| 1981 | Barry Round | South Melbourne | 22 | 22 |
| 1982 | Brian Wilson | Melbourne | 23 | 22 |
| 1983 | Ross Glendinning | North Melbourne | 24 | 22 |
| 1984 | Peter Moore (2/2) | Melbourne | 24 | 22 |
| 1985 | Brad Hardie | Footscray | 22 | 22 |
| 1986 | Robert DiPierdomenico | Hawthorn | 17 | 22 |
| 1986 | Greg Williams (1/2) | Sydney | 17 | 22 |
| 1987 | John Platten | Hawthorn | 20 | 22 |
| 1987 | Tony Lockett | St Kilda | 20 | 22 |
| 1988 | Gerard Healy | Sydney | 20 | 22 |
| 1989 | Paul Couch | Geelong | 22 | 22 |
| 1990 | Tony Liberatore | Footscray | 18 | 22 |
| 1991 | Jim Stynes | Melbourne | 25 | 22 |
| 1992 | Scott Wynd | Footscray | 20 | 22 |
| 1993 | Gavin Wanganeen | Essendon | 18 | 20 |
| 1994 | Greg Williams (2/2) | Carlton | 30 | 22 |
| 1995 | Paul Kelly | Sydney | 21 | 22 |
| 1996 | James Hird | Essendon | 21 | 22 |
| 1996 | Michael Voss | Brisbane Bears | 21 | 22 |
| 1997 | Robert Harvey (1/2) | St Kilda | 26 | 22 |
| 1998 | Robert Harvey (2/2) | St Kilda | 32 | 22 |
| 1999 | Shane Crawford | Hawthorn | 28 | 22 |
| 2000 | Shane Woewodin | Melbourne | 24 | 22 |
| 2001 | Jason Akermanis | Brisbane Lions | 23 | 22 |
| 2002 | Simon Black | Brisbane Lions | 25 | 22 |
| 2003 | Mark Ricciuto | Adelaide | 22 | 22 |
| 2003 | Nathan Buckley | Collingwood | 22 | 22 |
| 2003 | Adam Goodes (1/2) | Sydney | 22 | 22 |
| 2004 | Chris Judd (1/2) | West Coast | 30 | 22 |
| 2005 | Ben Cousins | West Coast | 20 | 22 |
| 2006 | Adam Goodes (2/2) | Sydney | 26 | 22 |
| 2007 | Jimmy Bartel | Geelong | 29 | 22 |
| 2008 | Adam Cooney | Western Bulldogs | 24 | 22 |
| 2009 | Gary Ablett Jr. (1/2) | Geelong | 30 | 22 |
| 2010 | Chris Judd (2/2) | Carlton | 30 | 22 |
| 2011 | Dane Swan | Collingwood | 34 | 22 |
| 2012 | Sam Mitchell | Hawthorn | 26 (Note: Medal was awarded retrospectively: Jobe Watson of Essendon was the original winner, but was ruled ineligible after found guilty of a doping violation.) | 22 |
| 2012 | Trent Cotchin | Richmond | 26 | 22 |
| 2013 | Gary Ablett Jr. (2/2) | Gold Coast | 28 | 22 |
| 2014 | Matt Priddis | West Coast | 26 | 22 |
| 2015 | Nat Fyfe (1/2) | Fremantle | 31 | 22 |
| 2016 | Patrick Dangerfield | Geelong | 35 | 22 |
| 2017 | Dustin Martin | Richmond | 36 | 22 |
| 2018 | Tom Mitchell | Hawthorn | 28 | 22 |
| 2019 | Nat Fyfe (2/2) | Fremantle | 33 | 22 |
| 2020 | Lachie Neale (1/2) | Brisbane Lions | 31 | 17 |
| 2021 | Ollie Wines | Port Adelaide | 36 | 22 |
| 2022 | Patrick Cripps (1/2) | Carlton | 29 | 22 |
| 2023 | Lachie Neale (2/2) | Brisbane Lions | 31 | 23 |
| 2024 | Patrick Cripps (2/2) | Carlton | 45 | 23 |
| 2025 | Matt Rowell | Gold Coast | 39 | 23 |
| 2026 | Nick Daicos | Collingwood | 47 | 23 |

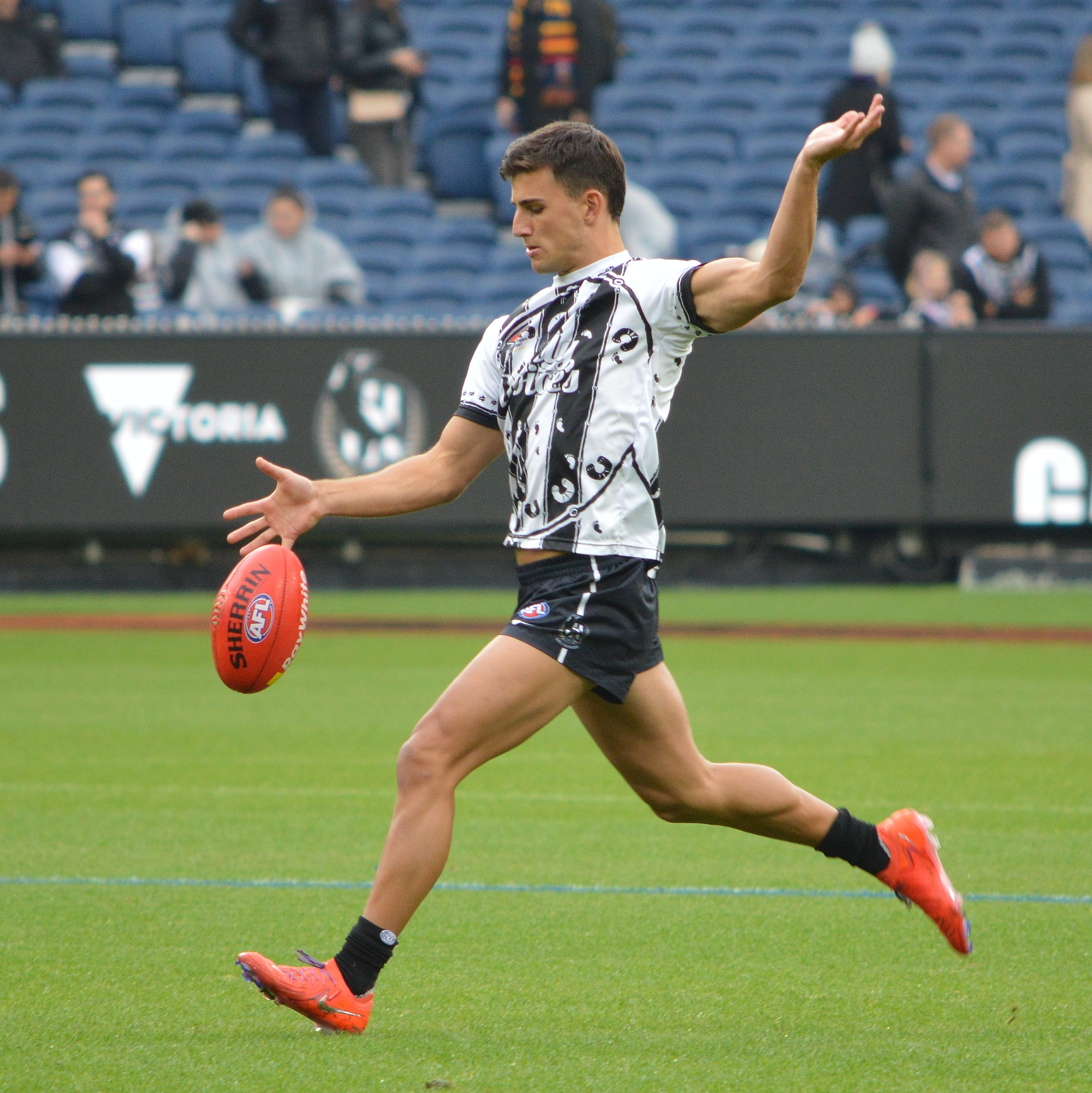
Nick Daicos, 2026 Brownlow Medalist (Record 47 Votes)

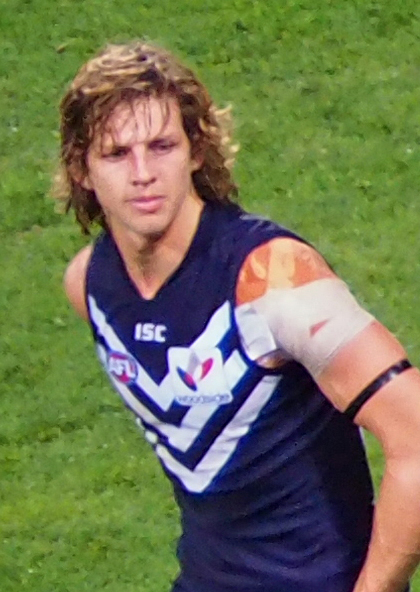
Nat Fyfe, 2015 and 2019 Brownlow Medallist

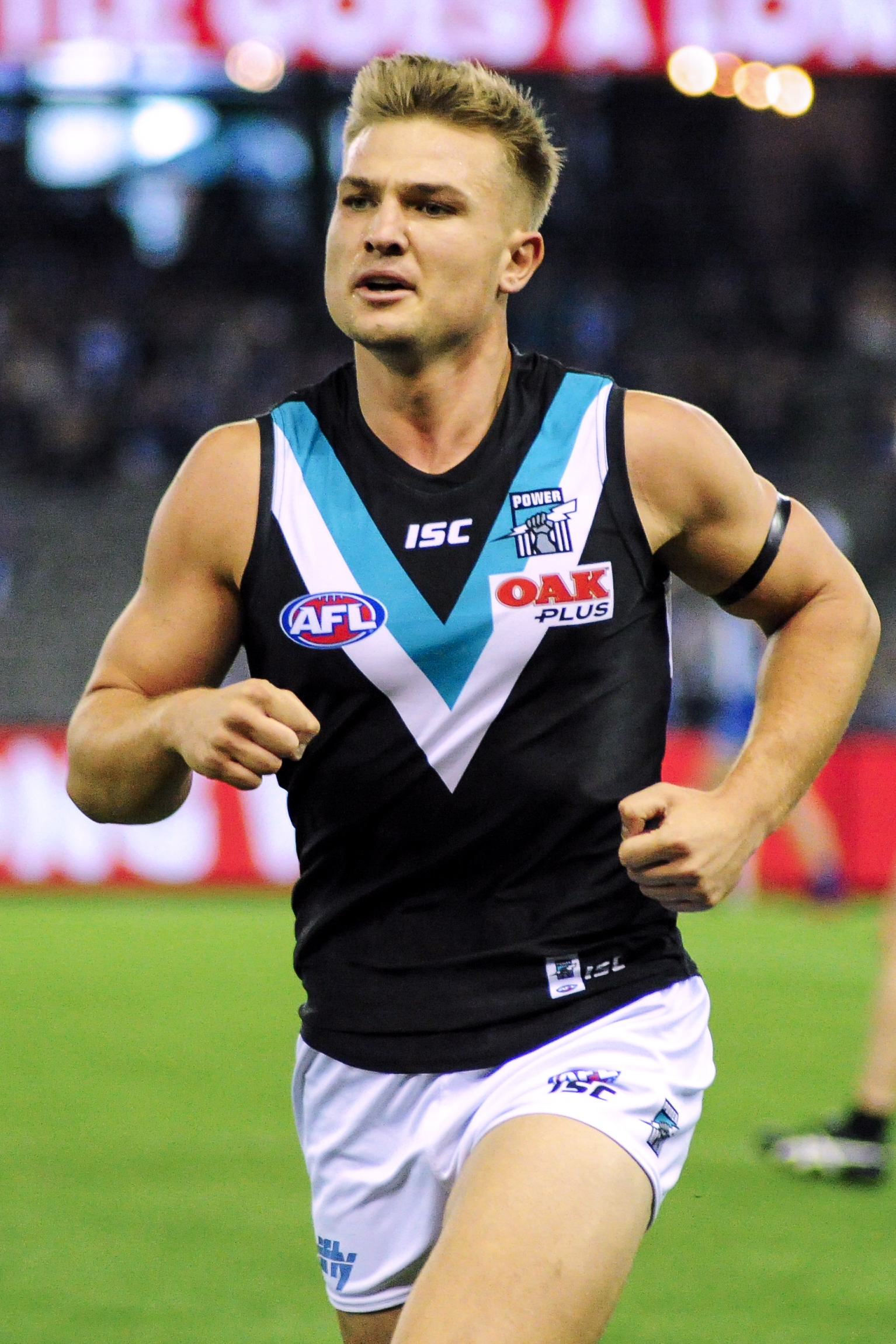
Ollie Wines, 2021 Brownlow Medallist

Notes

As a mark of respect to soldiers fighting overseas in World War II, the medal was not awarded during 1942–1945.

== Ineligible players who polled the most votes ==
A player guilty of an offence deemed worthy of a suspension by the AFL's disciplinary tribunal for serious on-field offences is ineligible to win the Brownlow Medal. Suspended players have tallied the highest number of votes for the award on three occasions. In the third of those cases, Jobe Watson, who won in 2012, was later found guilty of breaching WADA's anti-doping code in the 2012 season, and was retrospectively ruled ineligible by the AFL Commission in November 2016.

| Player | Team | Year | Votes | Outcome |
|---|---|---|---|---|
| Corey McKernan | North Melbourne | 1996 | 21 | Suspended; would have been joint winner with Hird and Voss. |
| Chris Grant | Western Bulldogs | 1997 | 27 | Suspended; would have won outright, beating Harvey by one vote. |
| Jobe Watson | Essendon | 2012 | 30 | Awarded the medal in 2012, beating Mitchell and Cotchin by four votes. In 2016 he was retrospectively ruled ineligible because of his involvement in the Essendon supplements saga. |

== Multiple winners ==
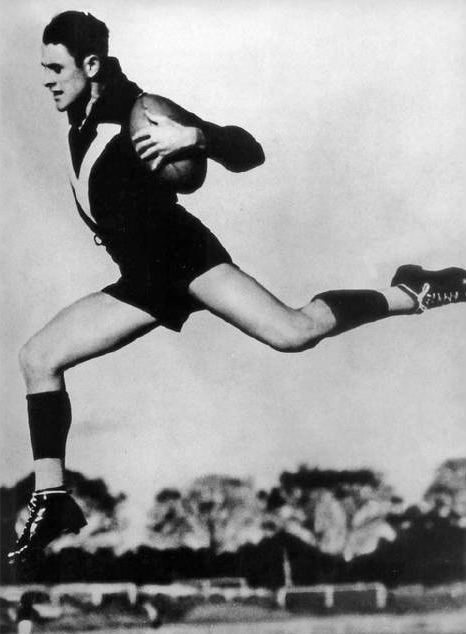
Haydn Bunton Sr, seen here representing Victoria (circa 1930), was the first of four three-time Brownlow Medal winners. This feat has not been replicated since Ian Stewart more than half a century ago.

The following players have won the Brownlow Medal multiple times.

| Medals | Player | Team | Seasons |
|---|---|---|---|
| 3 | Haydn Bunton Sr. | Fitzroy | 1931, 1932, 1935 |
| 3 | Dick Reynolds | Essendon | 1934, 1937, 1938 |
| 3 | Bob Skilton | South Melbourne | 1959, 1963, 1968 |
| 3 | Ian Stewart | St Kilda / Richmond | 1965, 1966, 1971 |
| 2 | Ivor Warne-Smith | Melbourne | 1926, 1928 |
| 2 | Bill Hutchison | Essendon | 1952, 1953 |
| 2 | Roy Wright | Richmond | 1952, 1954 |
| 2 | Keith Greig | North Melbourne | 1973, 1974 |
| 2 | Peter Moore | Collingwood / Melbourne | 1979, 1984 |
| 2 | Greg Williams | Sydney / Carlton | 1986, 1994 |
| 2 | Robert Harvey | St Kilda | 1997, 1998 |
| 2 | Adam Goodes | Sydney | 2003, 2006 |
| 2 | Chris Judd | West Coast / Carlton | 2004, 2010 |
| 2 | Gary Ablett Jr. | Geelong / Gold Coast | 2009, 2013 |
| 2 | Nat Fyfe | Fremantle | 2015, 2019 |
| 2 | Lachie Neale | Brisbane Lions | 2020, 2023 |
| 2 | Patrick Cripps | Carlton | 2022, 2024 |

== Brownlow wins by clubs ==
| Team | Wins | Years won |
|---|---|---|
| South Melbourne/Sydney | 14 | 1940, 1949, 1955, 1959, 1963, 1968, 1970, 1977, 1981, 1986, 1988, 1995 2003, 2006 |
| Collingwood | 10 | 1927, 1929, 1930, 1939, 1940, 1972 1979, 2003, 2011, 2026 |
| Footscray/Western Bulldogs | 10 | 1930, 1941, 1956, 1960, 1975, 1980, 1985, 1990, 1992, 2008 |
| St Kilda | 10 | 1925, 1957, 1958, 1959, 1965, 1966, 1967, 1987, 1997, 1998 |
| Fitzroy | 8 | 1931, 1932, 1933, 1935, 1936, 1950 1969, 1981 |
| Essendon | 8 | 1934, 1937, 1938, 1952, 1953, 1976 1993, 1996 |
| Richmond | 7 | 1930, 1948, 1952, 1954, 1971, 2012, 2017 |
| Melbourne | 7 | 1926, 1928, 1946, 1982, 1984, 1991, 2000 |
| Geelong | 7 | 1924, 1951, 1962, 1989, 2007, 2009, 2016 |
| Carlton | 7 | 1947, 1961, 1964, 1994, 2010, 2022, 2024 |
| Hawthorn | 6 | 1949, 1986, 1987, 1999, 2012, 2018 |
| North Melbourne | 5 | 1965, 1973, 1974, 1978, 1983 |
| Brisbane Lions | 4 | 2001, 2002, 2020, 2023 |
| West Coast | 3 | 2004, 2005, 2014 |
| Fremantle | 2 | 2015, 2019 |
| Gold Coast | 2 | 2013, 2025 |
| Brisbane Bears | 1 | 1996 |
| Adelaide | 1 | 2003 |
| Port Adelaide | 1 | 2021 |

== See also ==
- Brownlow Medal
