= 1928 Brownlow Medal =

Victorian Football League player award

- Winner: Ivor Warne-Smith (Melbourne); 8 votes

The 1928 Brownlow Medal was the fifth year the award was presented to the player adjudged the fairest and best player during the Victorian Football League (VFL) home and away season. Ivor Warne-Smith of the Melbourne Football Club won the medal by polling eight votes during the 1928 VFL season; having previously won the 1926 Brownlow Medal, Warne-Smith became the league's first dual Brownlow Medallist.

== Leading votegetters ==
	Player	Votes
1st	Ivor Warne-Smith (Melbourne)	8
2nd	Edward 'Carji' Greeves (Geelong)	5
=3rd	Leo Dwyer (North Melbourne)	4
=3rd	Jack Baggott (Richmond)	4
=3rd	Charles Chapman (Fitzroy)	4
=6th	Harry Clarke (South Melbourne)	3
=6th	Syd Coventry (Collingwood)	3
=6th	Cyril Gambetta (St Kilda)	3
=6th	Allan Hopkins (Footscray)	3
=6th	Basil McCormack (Richmond)	3
