= 1955 Brownlow Medal =

- Winner: Fred Goldsmith (South Melbourne); 21 votes

The 1955 Brownlow Medal was the 28th year the award was presented to the player adjudged the fairest and best player during the Victorian Football League (VFL) home and away season. Fred Goldsmith of the South Melbourne Football Club won the medal by polling twenty-one votes during the 1955 VFL season.

== Leading votegetters ==
	Player	Votes
1st	Fred Goldsmith (South Melbourne)	21
2nd	Bill Hutchison (Essendon)	20
3rd	Neil Roberts (St Kilda)	16
=4th	John James (Carlton)	15
=4th	Denis Cordner (Melbourne)	15
=4th	Eddie Lane (South Melbourne)	15
7th	Peter Box (Footscray)	14
8th	Des Rowe (Richmond)	13
9th	Lerrel Sharp (Collingwood)	12
10th	John Kerr (Footscray)	11
