= 1948 Brownlow Medal =

- Winner: Bill Morris (Richmond); 24 votes

The 1948 Brownlow Medal was the 21st year the award was presented to the player adjudged the fairest and best player during the Victorian Football League (VFL) home and away season. Bill Morris of the Richmond Football Club won the medal by polling 24 votes during the 1948 VFL season.

== Leading votegetters ==
	Player	Votes
1st	Bill Morris (Richmond)	24
2nd	Ollie Grieve (Carlton)	21
3rd	Bill Hutchison (Essendon)	17
4th	Ron Clegg (South Melbourne)	16
5th	Bill Twomey (Collingwood)	15
=6th	Allan Ruthven (Fitzroy)	13
=6th	Robert Hancock (St Kilda)	13
=8th	Dally O'Brien (North Melbourne)	12
=8th	Harold Bray (St Kilda)	12
=10th	Bert Deacon (Carlton)	11
=10th	Neil Mann (Collingwood)	11
=10th	Bruce Morrison (Geelong)	11
=10th	Alec Albiston (Hawthorn)	11
=10th	Alby Rodda (Melbourne)	11
