= 1925 Brownlow Medal =

Victorian Football League player award

- Winner: Colin Watson (St Kilda); 9 votes

The 1925 Brownlow Medal was the second year the award was presented to the player adjudged the fairest and best player during the Victorian Football League (VFL) home and away season. Colin Watson of the St Kilda Football Club won the medal by polling nine votes during the 1925 VFL season.

== Leading votegetters ==
	Player	Votes
1st	Colin Watson (St Kilda)	9
2nd	Edward Greeves (Geelong)	7
=3rd	Frank Maher (Essendon)	4
=3rd	Bert Chadwick (Melbourne)	4
=5th	Syd Coventry (Collingwood)	3
=5th	Len Wigraft (Fitzroy)	3
=5th	Clem Splatt (Hawthorn)	3
=5th	Dick Taylor (Melbourne)	3
=5th	Les Woodfield (South Melbourne)	3
=10th	Maurie Beasy (Carlton)	2
=10th	Hedley Blackmore (Carlton)	2
=10th	Ray Brew (Carlton)	2
=10th	Charlie Milburn (Collingwood)	2
=10th	Jack Moriarty (Fitzroy)	2
=10th	Col Laidlaw (Footscray)	2
=10th	Albert Outen (Footscray)	2
=10th	Lloyd Hagger (Geelong)	2
=10th	Edward Stevenson (Geelong)	2
=10th	Wels Eicke (North Melbourne)	2
=10th	Dave Walsh (North Melbourne)	2
=10th	Cyril Gambetta (St Kilda)	2
