= 1950 Brownlow Medal =

- Winner: Allan Ruthven (Fitzroy); 21 votes

The 1950 Brownlow Medal was the 23rd year the award was presented to the player adjudged the fairest and best player during the Victorian Football League (VFL) home and away season. Allan Ruthven of the Fitzroy Football Club won the medal by polling twenty-one votes during the 1950 VFL season.

== Leading votegetters ==
	Player	Votes
1st	Allan Ruthven (Fitzroy)	21
2nd	Fred Flanagan (Geelong)	18
=3rd	Charlie Sutton (Footscray)	17
=3rd	Bill Morris (Richmond)	17
=3rd	Bruce Phillips (St Kilda)	17
6th	Bill Hutchison (Essendon)	15
=7th	Ollie Grieve (Carlton)	12
=7th	Norm McDonald (Essendon)	12
=7th	Bill Stephen (Fitzroy)	12
=7th	Denis Cordner (Melbourne)	12
