= 1940 Brownlow Medal =

- Winner: Des Fothergill (Collingwood); Herbie Matthews (South Melbourne); 32 votes

The 1940 Brownlow Medal was the 17th year the award was presented to the player adjudged the fairest and best player during the Victorian Football League (VFL) home and away season. Des Fothergill of the Collingwood Football Club and Herbie Matthews of the South Melbourne Football Club both won the medal by polling thirty-two votes during the 1940 VFL season.

The count was the first tie since the introduction of the new voting system and tie-break in 1931: both players polled thirty-two votes, comprising seven 3-vote games, four 2-vote games and three 1-vote games. Under the rules at the time, the medal had neither another tie-breaker, nor a provision for more than one winner. One week after the count, the League opted to strike three medals: the true Brownlow Medal to remain in League hands, and Matthews and Fothergill each to receive a replica inscribed with the words "Tied for best and fairest" and "Presented to ... in recognition of being equal first for Brownlow Award in 1940".

The 1940 Brownlow Medal count was the only tie for the award which could not be separated by tie-breakers between 1931 and 1980, after which the provision was added for tied players to be considered true joint winners. In 1989, the League elected to award retrospective Brownlow Medals to all players who had previously polled the most votes but failed to win on a tie-breaker; this included Fothergill and Matthews, who were awarded official Brownlow Medals to supersede their replicas.

Matthews' and Fothergill's tallies of 32 votes set a new record as the highest under the medal's 3–2–1 voting system. This went on to be a long-standing record, held outright until it was tied by Robert Harvey in 1998, and finally beaten by Dane Swan (34 votes) in 2011.

== Leading votegetters ==
	Player	Votes
=1st	Des Fothergill (Collingwood)	32
=1st	Herbie Matthews (South Melbourne)	32
3rd	Hugh Torney (Essendon)	24
4th	Norman Ware (Footscray)	20
5th	Harry Hickey (Footscray)	15
6th	George Smeaton (Richmond)	14
=7th	George Dougherty (Geelong)	12
=7th	Stan Spinks (Hawthorn)	12
=7th	Jack Dyer (Richmond)	12
=10th	Wally Buttsworth (Essendon)	11
=10th	Ron Baggott (Melbourne)	11
