= 1954 Brownlow Medal =

- Winner: Roy Wright (Richmond); 29 votes

The 1954 Brownlow Medal was the 27th year the award was presented to the player adjudged the fairest and best player during the Victorian Football League (VFL) home and away season. Roy Wright of the Richmond Football Club won the medal by polling twenty-nine votes during the 1954 VFL season.

== Leading votegetters ==
	Player	Votes
1st	Roy Wright (Richmond)	29
2nd	Neil Mann (Collingwood)	19
=3rd	John Gill (Essendon)	14
=3rd	Harvey Stevens (Footscray)	14
=3rd	Eddie Lane (South Melbourne)	14
=6th	Len Crane (Hawthorn)	13
=6th	John Brady (North Melbourne)	13
=8th	John James (Carlton)	12
=8th	Jack Collins (Footscray)	12
=8th	Peter Pianto (Geelong)	12
=8th	Denis Cordner (Melbourne)	12
=8th	Allen Aylett (North Melbourne)	12
=8th	Ray Poulter (Richmond)	12
=8th	Jim Ross (St Kilda)	12
