= 1952 Brownlow Medal =

- Winner: Bill Hutchison (Essendon); Roy Wright (Richmond); 21 votes

The 1952 Brownlow Medal was the 25th year the award was presented to the player adjudged the fairest and best player during the Victorian Football League (VFL) home and away season. Bill Hutchison of the Essendon Football Club and Roy Wright of the Richmond Football Club both won the medal by polling twenty-one votes during the 1952 VFL season.

Under the tie-breaker rules in place in 1952, Wright was originally the outright winner: he and Hutchison were tied on 21 votes and five 3-vote games, but Wright polled three 2-vote games to Hutchison's two. In 1980, the League removed the tie-break from the rules and allowed for multiple tied winners in the same year; and in 1989 it retrospectively removed the tie-breaker from all previous counts, elevating Hutchison to joint winner of the 1952 medal.

== Leading votegetters ==
	Player	Votes
=1st	Bill Hutchison (Essendon)	21
=1st	Roy Wright (Richmond)	21
3rd	Harold Bray (St Kilda)	19
4th	Peter Pianto (Geelong)	17
5th	Bill Wilson (Richmond)	15
=6th	Thorold Merrett (Collingwood)	12
=6th	Jack Collins (Footscray)	12
=8th	Denis Cordner (Melbourne)	11
=8th	Stuart Spencer (Melbourne)	11
=10th	Ollie Grieve (Carlton)	10
=10th	John Hyde (Geelong)	10
=10th	John Kennedy (Hawthorn)	10
=10th	Bill Gunn (South Melbourne)	10
=10th	Jim Ross (St Kilda)	10
