= 1953 Brownlow Medal =

- Winner: Bill Hutchison (Essendon); 26 votes

The 1953 Brownlow Medal was the 26th year the award was presented to the player adjudged the fairest and best player during the Victorian Football League (VFL) home and away season. Bill Hutchison of the Essendon Football Club won the medal by polling twenty-six votes during the 1953 VFL season.

== Leading votegetters ==
	Player	Votes
1st	Bill Hutchison (Essendon)	26
2nd	Bob Rose (Collingwood)	22
3rd	Neil Mann (Collingwood)	17
4th	Bernie Smith (Geelong)	16
5th	Ron Clegg (South Melbourne)	14
6th	Des Rowe (Richmond)	13
=7th	Ken Hands (Carlton)	12
=7th	Thorold Merrett (Collingwood)	12
=7th	Jack Clarke (Essendon)	12
=7th	Harvey Stevens (Footscray)	12
=7th	Allen Aylett (North Melbourne)	12
