= 1929 Brownlow Medal =

Victorian Football League player award

- Winner: Albert Collier (Collingwood); 6 votes

The 1929 Brownlow Medal was the sixth year the award was presented to the player adjudged the fairest and best player during the Victorian Football League (VFL) home and away season. Albert Collier of the Collingwood Football Club won the medal by polling six votes during the 1929 VFL season.

A new provision was introduced to suspend Brownlow Medal voting during rounds when the state team was active to avoid disadvantaging the players selected in the team. This provision was not repeated in future years.

== Leading votegetters ==
	Player	Votes
1st	Albert Collier (Collingwood)	6
=2nd	Allan Hopkins (Footscray)	4
=2nd	Ivor Warne-Smith (Melbourne)	4
=2nd	Arthur Batchelor (Fitzroy)	4
=5th	Jack Titus (Richmond)	3
=5th	Harold Matthews (St Kilda)	3
=5th	Jack Collins (Geelong)	3
=5th	Arthur Ludlow (St Kilda)	3
=5th	Ernest Utting (Hawthorn)	3
=5th	Reg Hickey (Geelong)	3
=5th	Bob Makeham (Collingwood)	3
=5th	Harry Vallence (Carlton)	3
=5th	Charlie Cameron (North Melbourne)	3
