= 1930 Brownlow Medal =

Victorian Football League player award

- Winners: Harry Collier (Collingwood); Allan Hopkins (Footscray); Stan Judkins (Richmond); 4 votes

The 1930 Brownlow Medal was the seventh year the award was presented to the player adjudged the fairest and best player during the Victorian Football League (VFL) home-and-away season. The award was won jointly by Stan Judkins of the Richmond Football Club, Harry Collier of the Collingwood Football Club, and Allan Hopkins of the Footscray Football Club. It was the first time more than one player won the award in the same year.

== History ==
Under the voting system in place at the time, the central umpire awarded one vote to the player he deemed best on the ground in each match. When the votes were counted on 17 September, three players tied for the most votes with four each: Harry Collier of the Collingwood Football Club, Allan Hopkins of the Footscray Football Club, and Stan Judkins of the Richmond Football Club. It was the first time there had been a tie for the award; however, at the time, the league did not recognise ties for the medal, and they needed to break the tie.

The medal was not immediately awarded, as the rules governing the medal were at this time contradictory: one provision provided that the winner of the medal would be player who polled the largest percentage of votes against games played; and a second provision which had existed since 1924 stated that in the case of a tie for total votes, that the umpires be called together to decide upon on a winner among the tied players. There were also three informal votes cast; that is, votes in which the committee was unable to determine for which player the umpire had intended to vote, which was not uncommon at the time, one of which was understood to have read 'Collier' without differentiating between Harry Collier and his brother Albert (who finished one vote behind the leaders).

The delegates of the Umpire and Permit Committee met on 19 September; it did not make a final decision, instead electing to defer the matter to the next full meeting of all League delegates. The delegates recommended that no medal be awarded, owing in large part to the informal votes. The full League met on 26 September and rejected the recommendation, instead awarding the medal to Judkins on the 'percentage of votes vs games' provision – Judkins polled his four votes from 12 games, compared with Hopkins' 15 games and Collier's 18 games. The outcome is viewed with irony, as the reason for Judkins' lower game count was that he was dropped to the seconds for the last five rounds due to poor form.

In its 26 September meeting, the League appointed a subcommittee to revise the medal's rules, resulting in a new voting system and tiebreaker rule being established from the 1931 season.

In 1980, the league removed all tie-breakers from its Brownlow Medal procedure, and in 1989 elected to award retrospective Brownlow Medals to all players who had previously polled the most votes but lost on a tie-breaker. As such, Judkins, Hopkins and Collier are all now considered joint Brownlow Medallists for the 1930 season.

== Leading vote-getters ==
	Player	Votes
=1st	Harry Collier (Collingwood)	4
=1st	Allan Hopkins (Footscray)	4
=1st	Stan Judkins (Richmond)	4
=4th	Albert Collier (Collingwood)	3
=4th	Keith Forbes (Essendon)	3
=4th	Charles Chapman (Fitzroy)	3
=4th	George Todd (Geelong)	3
=4th	Jack Sharpley (Hawthorn)	3
=4th	Bob Johnson (Melbourne)	3
=4th	Bert Foster (Richmond)	3
=4th	Peter Reville (South Melbourne)	3
