= 1934 Brownlow Medal =

- Winner: Dick Reynolds (Essendon); 19 votes

The 1934 Brownlow Medal was the 11th year the award was presented to the player adjudged the fairest and best player during the Victorian Football League (VFL) home-and-away season. Dick Reynolds of the Essendon Football Club won the medal by polling nineteen votes during the 1934 VFL season.

In the last game of the 1934 season, Haydn Bunton Sr dominated; and, as he walked off the ground, he made a flippant remark to umpire Jack McMurray Sr., along the lines of: "That wasn't bad today, Jack."

"Never try to bribe an umpire," McMurray apparently replied—and left him out of the votes. Bunton lost the Brownlow medal to Dick Reynolds by one vote.

== Leading vote-getters ==
	Player	Votes
1st	Dick Reynolds (Essendon)	19
2nd	Haydn Bunton (Fitzroy)	18
=3rd	Jack Regan (Collingwood)	17
=3rd	Keith Shea (Carlton)	17
=3rd	Ray Martin (Richmond)	17
6th	Wilfred Smallhorn (Fitzroy)	16
7th	Gordon Strang (Richmond)	14
8th	Bob Pratt (South Melbourne)	13
9th	Norman Ware (Footscray)	12
=10th	Jack Davis (St Kilda)	11
=10th	Keith Forbes (Essendon)	11
=10th	Colin Watson (St Kilda)	11
