= 1946 Brownlow Medal =

- Winner: Don Cordner (Melbourne); 20 votes

The 1946 Brownlow Medal was the 19th year the award was presented to the player adjudged the fairest and best player during the Victorian Football League (VFL) home and away season. Don Cordner of the Melbourne Football Club won the medal by polling twenty votes during the 1946 VFL season.

== Leading votegetters ==
	Player	Votes
1st	Don Cordner (Melbourne)	20
=2nd	Jack Howell (Carlton)	19
=2nd	Bill Morris (Richmond)	19
4th	Bert Deacon (Carlton)	17
5th	Allan Ruthven (Fitzroy)	16
=6th	Fred Flanagan (Geelong)	15
=6th	Syd Dyer (North Melbourne)	15
=8th	Bill Twomey (Collingwood)	14
=8th	Tom Morrow (Geelong)	14
10th	Bill Pearson (Essendon)	13
