= 2011 Brownlow Medal =

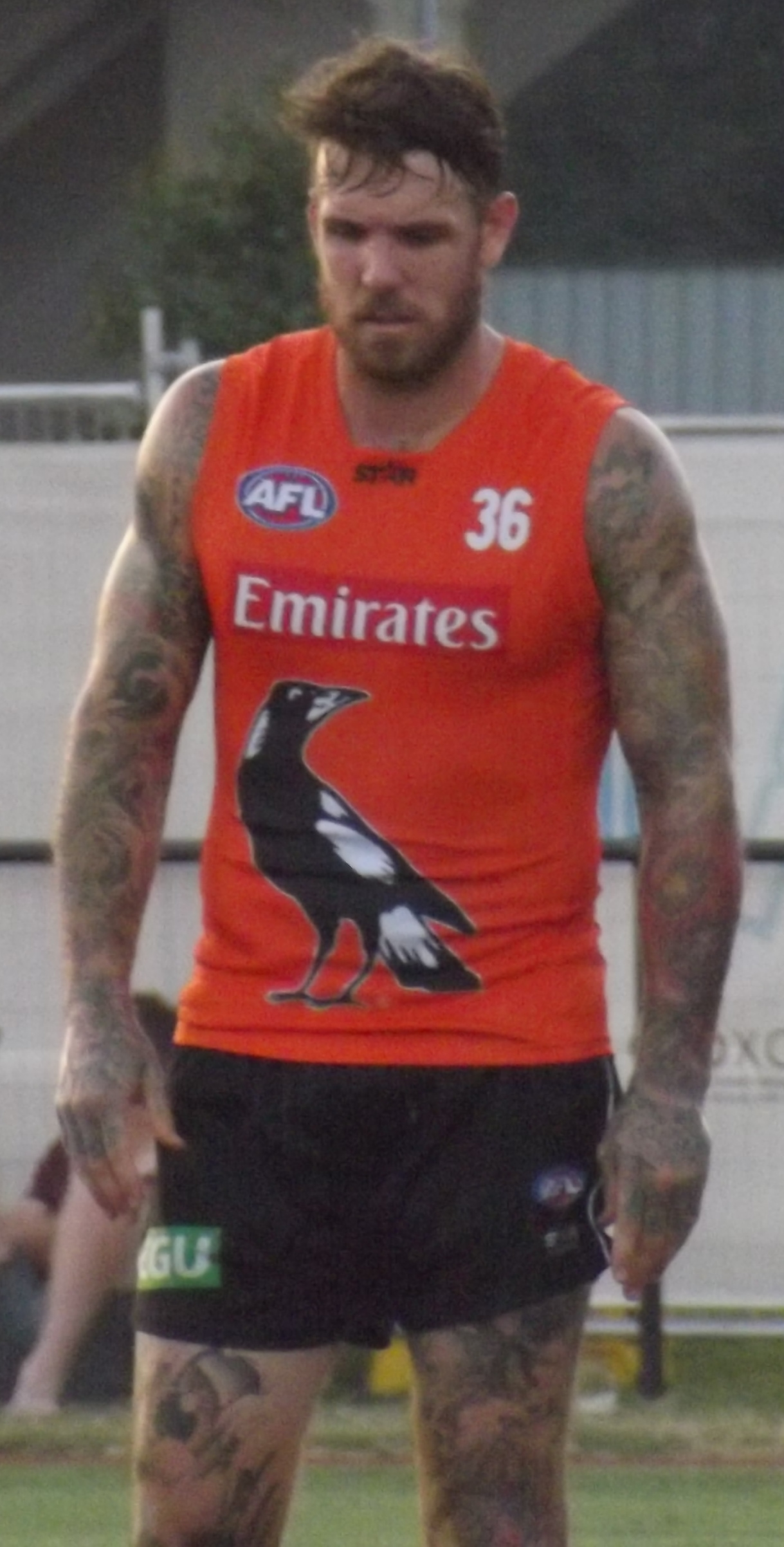
- 2011 Brownlow Medallist, Dane Swan
- Date: 26 September
- Location: Crown Palladium
- Hosted by: Bruce McAvaney
- Winner: Dane Swan (Collingwood); 34 votes

Television/radio coverage
- Network: Seven Network

The 2011 Brownlow Medal was the 84th year the award was presented to the player adjudged the fairest and best player during the Australian Football League (AFL) home and away season. Dane Swan of the Collingwood Football Club won the medal by polling thirty-four votes during the 2011 AFL season.

Swan's tally of 34 votes broke the long standing record for most votes in a Brownlow Medal counted under the 3-2-1 voting system, previously set at 32 votes by Herbie Matthews, Des Fothergill (1940) and Robert Harvey (1998 Brownlow Medal). It remained the record until surpassed by Patrick Dangerfield in 2016.

== Leading vote-getters ==
	Player	Votes
1st	Dane Swan (Collingwood)	34
	Sam Mitchell (Hawthorn)*	30
2nd	Nick Dal Santo (St Kilda)	28
=3rd	Matthew Boyd (Western Bulldogs)	24
=3rd	Scott Pendlebury (Collingwood)	24
=5th	Gary Ablett (Gold Coast)	23
=5th	Chris Judd (Carlton)	23
	Lance Franklin (Hawthorn)*	20
=7th	Adam Goodes (Sydney)	19
=7th	Marc Murphy (Carlton)	19
=7th	Matt Priddis (West Coast)	19
	Brent Moloney (Melbourne)*	19
10th	Dean Cox (West Coast)	18

* The player was ineligible to win the medal due to suspension by the AFL Tribunal during the year.

== Voting procedure ==
The three field umpires (those umpires who control the flow of the game, as opposed to goal or boundary umpires) confer after each match and award three votes, two votes, and one vote to the players they regard as the best, second-best and third-best in the match, respectively. The votes are kept secret until the awards night, and they are read and tallied on the evening.

=== Favourites ===
For most of the season, Carlton's Chris Judd was an overwhelming favourite in betting markets to win the award for a second consecutive year, and third time overall. By round 18, his odds were shorter than $2 to win the award, and one agency, Sportsbet, decided to pay out early to all punters who had already backed Judd for the win. Sydney's Adam Goodes, who had attracted odds as wide as $30 during the season, had a very strong end to the season, and closed in to second-favouritism by the count. Collingwood's Scott Pendlebury and Dane Swan, and Carlton's Marc Murphy, were also expected to feature prominently in the count.

=== Ineligible players ===
As the medal is awarded to the fairest and best player in the league, those who have been suspended during the season by the AFL Tribunal (or, who avoided suspension only because of a discount for a good record or an early guilty plea) are ineligible to win the award; however, they may still continue to poll votes. The most notable player ineligible for the 2011 Brownlow Medal was Hawthorn's Sam Mitchell. Mitchell received a one-match sanction, which was reduced to a reprimand without suspension with an early guilty plea, for rough conduct against Geelong's, Steve Johnson in round 5. Mitchell featured prominently in several media best and fairest awards, including winning the Lou Richards Medal and the Herald Sun Player of the Year, and was considered a realistic chance to poll the most votes; he ultimately polled the second-most votes, four fewer than winner Dane Swan. His 30 votes was the most by any ineligible player in AFL history until it was surpassed by Geelong's Patrick Dangerfield's 33 votes in 2017.

Other ineligible players included: Dale Thomas (Collingwood); Joel Selwood, Joel Corey, Matthew Scarlett, Brad Ottens (Geelong); Lance Franklin, Cyril Rioli, Jordan Lewis (Hawthorn); Shane Mumford, Ryan O'Keefe (Sydney); Leigh Montagna, Nick Riewoldt (St Kilda); Colin Sylvia, Jack Trengove, Brent Moloney (Melbourne); Jack Redden (Brisbane Lions); Brent Stanton (Essendon); Luke McPharlin (Fremantle); Nathan Bock (Gold Coast); Nic Naitanui (West Coast); and Daniel Cross (Western Bulldogs).
