= Follower (Australian rules football) =

Playing position in Australian rules football

In Australian rules football, the followers are the players in the following three positions: ruckman, ruck-rover, and rover. These three players are known as followers because they have traditionally been used as players that follow the ball all around the ground, as opposed to playing in a set position. In recent years, there has been a decreased emphasis on set positions in Australian football. Followers still cover more ground than any other player on the field.

Australian rules football positions
B:	back pocket	full-back	back pocket
HB:	half-back flank	centre half-back	half-back flank
C:	wing	centre	wing
HF:	half-forward flank	centre half-forward	half-forward flank
F:	forward pocket	full-forward	forward pocket
Foll:	ruckman	ruck rover	rover
Int:	interchange bench	interchange bench	interchange bench
Int:	interchange bench		
Coach:	coach		

== Ruckman ==
The ruckman's job is to contest with the opposing ruckman at centre-bounces that take place at the start of each quarter or after each goal, and at stoppages (i.e., boundary throw ins, ball-ups). The ruckman usually uses his height (typically players are over 195 cm tall) to palm/tap the ball down so that a ruck-rover or rover can run onto it.

Notable ruckmen in Australian football over the years include:

- Graham "Polly" Farmer (East Perth, Geelong and West Perth, 1953-1971), Sandover Medallist 1956, 1957, 1960; Named first ruck in AFL Team of the Century (1996)
- John Nicholls (Carlton, 1957-1974), Named back pocket in AFL Team of the Century (1996)
- Jack Dyer
- Roy Wright Brownlow Medallist 1952, 1954
- Carl Ditterich (St Kilda and Melbourne, 1963–1980)
- John "Sam" Newman (Geelong, 1964–1980)
- Gary Dempsey (Footscray and North Melbourne, 1967–1984), Brownlow Medallist 1975
- Don Scott (Hawthorn, 1967–1981)
- Graham Moss (Claremont and Essendon, 1968–1983), Brownlow Medallist 1976
- Barry Round (Footscray and Sydney, 1969–1986), Brownlow Medallist 1981
- Rick Davies (Sturt, Hawthorn and South Adelaide, 1970–1986)
- Simon Madden (Essendon, 1974–1992), Norm Smith Medallist 1985
- Peter Moore (Collingwood and Melbourne, 1974–1987), Brownlow Medallist 1979, 1984
- Justin Madden (Essendon and Carlton, 1980–1996)
- Paul Salmon
- Jim Stynes (Melbourne, 1987–1998), Brownlow Medallist 1991
- Scott Wynd (Western Bulldogs, 1988–2000), Brownlow Medallist 1992
- Peter Everitt
- Dean Cox
- Shaun Rehn (West Adelaide, Adelaide and Hawthorn, 1990–2002)
- Matthew Primus
- Jeff White
- Corey McKernan
- Aaron Sandilands
- Todd Goldstein
- Max Gawn

== Ruck-rover ==
Before the 1950s, the role of the ruck-rover was known as the follower. His role was to assist the ruckman and rover at centre bounces by blocking and shepherding them from opposition players. This position all but disappeared in the 1950s with the success of Ron Barassi, Jr. in a role designated for him by Melbourne coach Norm Smith. The closest equivalent of the follower position in today's game is known as a tagger.

The ruck-rover's job is to be directly beneath the flight of the ball when a ruckman taps the ball down, allowing an easy take away, or clearance, from a stoppage. Typically, players are not as tall as the ruckman, typically ranging from 170–190 cm in height.

Notable followers and ruck-rovers in Australian football over the years include:

- Ron Barassi, Jr. (Melbourne and Carlton, 1953–1969)
- Paul Bagshaw (Sturt, 1964–1980),
- Michael Tuck (Hawthorn, 1972–1991), former AFL career games record holder (426)
- Robert Harvey
- Chris Judd
- Jobe Watson
- Daniel Kerr
- Garry Hocking (Geelong, 1987–2001)
- Michael McGuane (Collingwood and Carlton, 1987–1997)
- Brad Sewell
- Trent Cotchin

== Rover ==
The rover is a player who lurks around centre bounces and stoppages to receive the ball from a ruck rover and complete a clearance. Rovers are typically the smallest player on the ground.

Notable rovers in Australian football over the years include:

- Harry Collier (Collingwood, 1926–1940), Brownlow Medallist 1930
- Haydn Bunton, Sr. (Fitzroy, Subiaco and Port Adelaide, 1931–1945), Brownlow Medallist 1931, 1932, 1935; Sandover Medallist 1938, 1939, 1941; Named forward pocket in AFL Team of the Century (1996)
- Allan Ruthven (Fitzroy, 1940–1954) Brownlow Medallist 1950
- Lou Richards (Collingwood, 1941–1955)
- Bill Hutchison (Essendon, 1942–1957), Brownlow Medallist 1952, 1953
- Steve Marsh (South Fremantle and East Fremantle, 1945–1958) Sandover Medallist 1952
- Bob Skilton (South Melbourne, 1956–1971), Brownlow Medallist 1959, 1963, 1968; Named rover in AFL Team of the Century (1996)
- Bill Goggin (Geelong, 1958–1971)
- Ross G. Smith (St Kilda, 1961–1975), Brownlow medallist 1967
- Bill Walker (Swan Districts, 1961–1976), Sandover Medallist 1965, 1966, 1967, 1970
- Barry Cable (Perth, North Melbourne and East Perth, 1962–1979), Sandover Medallist 1964, 1968, 1973
- Kevin Bartlett (Richmond, 1965–1983)
- Peter Crimmins (Hawthorn, 1966–1971)
- Leigh Matthews (Hawthorn, 1969–1985), Named forward pocket in AFL Team of the Century (1996)
- Tony Liberatore (Western Bulldogs, 1986–2002), Brownlow Medallist 1990
- John Platten (Hawthorn, 1986–1997), Magarey Medallist 1984, Brownlow Medallist 1987
- Gary Ablett, Jr. (Geelong and Gold Coast, 2002–2020), Brownlow Medallist 2009, 2013

== Bibliography ==
- Pascoe, Robert (1995). The winter game : the complete history of Australian football. Port Melbourne: The Text Publishing Company. ISBN 0-85561-644-X.

== See also ==
- Football (Australian rules) positions
