= 1941 Brownlow Medal =

- Winner: Norman Ware (Footscray); 23 votes

The 1941 Brownlow Medal was the 18th year the award was presented to the player adjudged the fairest and best player during the Victorian Football League (VFL) home and away season. Norman Ware of the Footscray Football Club won the medal by polling twenty-three votes during the 1941 VFL season.

== Leading votegetters ==
	Player	Votes
1st	Norman Ware (Footscray)	23
2nd	Herbie Matthews (South Melbourne)	22
3rd	Fred Hughson (Fitzroy)	17
4th	Reg Garvin (St Kilda)	14
	Bob Chitty (Carlton)*	14
=5th	Harry Hickey (Footscray)	13
=5th	Andy Angwin (Hawthorn)	13
=5th	George Kennedy (North Melbourne)	13
=5th	Jack Graham (South Melbourne)	13
=9th	Jack Regan (Collingwood)	12
=9th	Wally Buttsworth (Essendon)	12
=9th	Arthur Olliver (Footscray)	12
=9th	Jim Cleary (South Melbourne)	12

* The player was ineligible to win the medal due to suspension by the VFL Tribunal during the year.
