= 1936 Brownlow Medal =

- Winner: Denis Ryan (Fitzroy); 26 votes

The 1936 Brownlow Medal was the 13th year the award was presented to the player adjudged the fairest and best player during the Victorian Football League (VFL) home and away season. Denis Ryan of the Fitzroy Football Club won the medal by polling twenty-six votes during the 1936 VFL season.

== Leading votegetters ==
	Player	Votes
1st	Denis Ryan (Fitzroy)	26
2nd	Reg Hickey (Geelong)	21
3rd	Herbie Matthews (South Melbourne)	20
=4th	Allan La Fontaine (Melbourne)	19
=4th	Alby Morrison (Footscray)	19
=6th	Bill Mohr (St Kilda)	17
=6th	Jack Regan (Collingwood)	17
8th	Tommy Quinn (Geelong)	16
9th	Dick Reynolds (Essendon)	15
10th	Norman Ware (Footscray)	14
