= 1960 Brownlow Medal =

- Winner: John Schultz (Footscray); 20 votes

Television/radio coverage
- Network: Seven Network

The 1960 Brownlow Medal was the 33rd year the award was presented to the player adjudged the fairest and best player during the Victorian Football League (VFL) home and away season. John Schultz of the Footscray Football Club won the medal by polling twenty votes during the 1960 VFL season.

== Leading votegetters ==
| | Player | Votes |
|---|---|---|
| 1st | John Schultz (Footscray) | 20 |
| 2nd | Kevin Murray (Fitzroy) | 19 |
| 3rd | Laurie Dwyer (North Melbourne) | 18 |
| 4th | Wally Clark (Fitzroy) | 17 |
| 5th | John Beckwith (Melbourne) | 15 |
| 6th | John James (Carlton) | 12 |
| =7th | Graham Donaldson (Carlton) | 11 |
| =7th | Bill Goggin (Geelong) | 11 |
| =7th | Bob Skilton (South Melbourne) | 11 |
| =10th | John Birt (Essendon) | 10 |
| =10th | Brendan Edwards (Hawthorn) | 10 |
| =10th | Frank Johnson (South Melbourne) | 10 |
| =10th | Lance Oswald (St Kilda) | 10 |
