= 1937 Brownlow Medal =

- Winner: Dick Reynolds (Essendon); 27 votes

The 1937 Brownlow Medal was the 14th year the award was presented to the player adjudged the fairest and best player during the Victorian Football League (VFL) home and away season. Dick Reynolds of the Essendon Football Club won the medal by polling twenty-seven votes during the 1937 VFL season.

== Leading votegetters ==
	Player	Votes
1st	Dick Reynolds (Essendon)	27
2nd	Herbie Matthews (South Melbourne)	23
3rd	Jack Mueller (Melbourne)	17
=4th	Keith Shea (Carlton)	16
=4th	Jack Regan (Collingwood)	16
6th	Norman Ware (Footscray)	15
7th	Jack Graham (South Melbourne)	14
8th	Des Fothergill (Collingwood)	13
=9th	Jack Davis (St Kilda)	12
=9th	Jim Francis (Carlton)	12
=9th	Denis Ryan (Fitzroy)	12
