= Jock Cordner =

Australian rules footballer, born 1910

Personal information
- Full name: Jack Cordner
- Born: 9 June 1910
- Died: 14 September 1996 (aged 86)
- Original team: Kaniva / Spotswood
- Height: 175 cm (5 ft 9 in)
- Weight: 75 kg (165 lb)

Playing career^{1}
Years	Club	Games (Goals)
1931–1932	Footscray	7 (4)
1933–1934	Fitzroy	24 (23)
1935–1941	North Melbourne	88 (8)
Total		119 (35)
- ^{1} Playing statistics correct to the end of 1941.

Jack 'Jock' Cordner (9 June 1910 – 14 September 1996) was an Australian rules footballer who played for Footscray, Fitzroy and North Melbourne in the VFL.

Cordner played as a centreman and started his VFL career at Footscray. In two seasons with the club he managed just seven games due to a leg injury and he moved to Fitzroy in 1933. He played a couple of seasons with Fitzroy before being cleared to North Melbourne where he went on to play his best football. He won their 1938 Best and Fairest award and finished 6th in that year's Brownlow Medal. Cordner captained North Melbourne in 1941 but it would be his final season of league football, retiring due to injury. During his career he also represented Victoria at interstate football.
