= 1956 Brownlow Medal =

- Winner: Peter Box (Footscray); 22 votes

The 1956 Brownlow Medal was the 29th year the award was presented to the player adjudged the fairest and best player during the Victorian Football League (VFL) home and away season. Peter Box of the Footscray Football Club won the medal by polling twenty-two votes during the 1956 VFL season.

== Leading votegetters ==
	Player	Votes
1st	Peter Box (Footscray)	22
2nd	Peter Pianto (Geelong)	16
3rd	Jim Dorgan (South Melbourne)	15
=4th	Roy Simmonds (Hawthorn)	13
=4th	Ron Barassi (Melbourne)	13
=4th	John Beckwith (Melbourne)	13
7th	Neil Roberts (St Kilda)	12
=8th	Bill Stephen (Fitzroy)	11
=8th	Bernie Smith (Geelong)	11
=8th	John O'Mahoney (Hawthorn)	11
=8th	Denis Cordner (Melbourne)	11
=8th	Des Rowe (Richmond)	11
