= 1961 Brownlow Medal =

- Winner: John James (Carlton); 21 votes

Television/radio coverage
- Network: Seven Network

The 1961 Brownlow Medal was the 34th year the award was presented to the player adjudged the fairest and best player during the Victorian Football League (VFL) home and away season. John James of the Carlton Football Club won the medal by polling twenty-one votes during the 1961 VFL season.

== Leading votegetters ==
	Player	Votes
1st	John James (Carlton)	21
2nd	Laurie Dwyer (North Melbourne)	19
3rd	Ian Law (Hawthorn)	17
4th	Frank Johnson (South Melbourne)	13
=5th	Charlie Evans (Footscray)	12
=5th	Ted Whitten (Footscray)	12
=5th	Brendan Edwards (Hawthorn)	12
=5th	Jim Taylor (South Melbourne)	12
=9th	Kevin Murray (Fitzroy)	11
=9th	Ron Branton (Richmond)	11
