= 2020 Brownlow Medal =

Australian Football League award

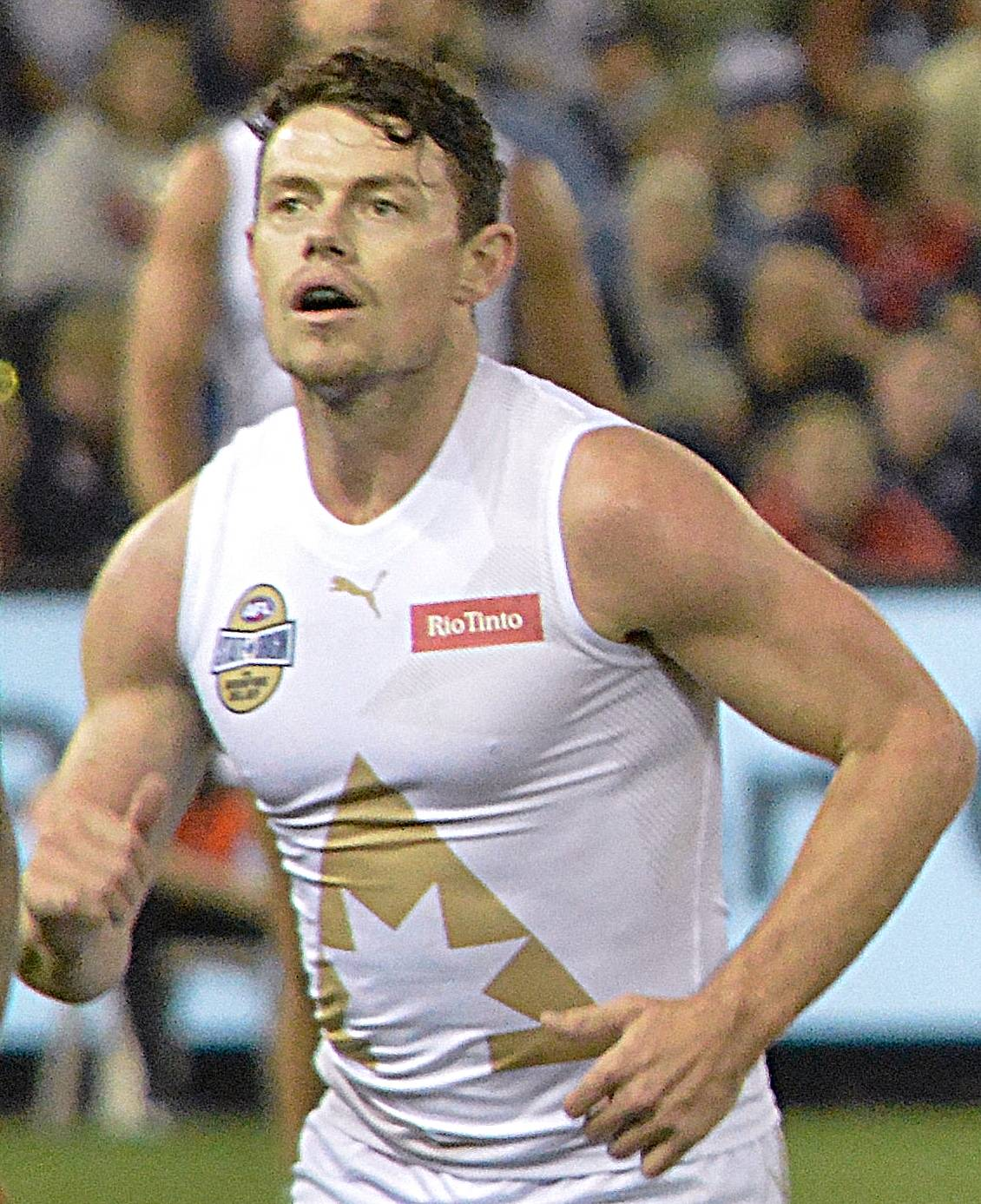
- 2020 Brownlow Medallist, Lachie Neale, pictured in February 2020
- Date: 18 October 2020
- Location: Various venues
- Hosted by: Hamish McLachlan and Jacqui Felgate
- Winner(s): Lachie Neale (Brisbane Lions) (31 votes)

Television/radio coverage
- Network: Seven Network; Telstra

The 2020 Brownlow Medal was the 93rd year the award was presented to the player adjudged the best and fairest player during the Australian Football League (AFL) home-and-away season. Lachie Neale of the Brisbane Lions was the winner, with 31 votes.

Neale's tally of 31 votes from only 17 matches (1.82 per game) in the shortened 2020 season set a new record for most votes per game by a winner under the 3–2–1 voting system. Neale broke the long-standing record of Dick Reynolds, who polled 27 votes from the 15 games he played in 1937 (1.80 per game); and held the record until it was broken by Patrick Cripps in 2024.

== Leading vote-getters ==
	Player	Votes
1st	Lachie Neale (Brisbane Lions)	31
2nd	Travis Boak (Port Adelaide)	21
=3rd	Christian Petracca (Melbourne)	20
=3rd	Jack Steele (St Kilda)	20
=5th	Patrick Dangerfield (Geelong)	15
=5th	Dustin Martin (Richmond)	15
=5th	Jack Macrae (Western Bulldogs)	15
=5th	Luke Parker (Sydney)	15
=9th	Cameron Guthrie (Geelong)	14
=9th	Clayton Oliver (Melbourne)	14

* The player was ineligible to win the medal due to suspension by the AFL Tribunal during the year.

== Impact of the COVID-19 pandemic ==
Due to the COVID-19 pandemic which caused the season to be suspended for nearly three months, the regular season was reduced from 22 matches per club to 17, with each team playing each other once as well as having a bye round.

In September, it was announced that the Brownlow Medal count would be held as a virtual event, with joint functions held on the Gold Coast, Brisbane, Sydney, Melbourne, Adelaide and Perth, but not at the Crown Palladium as had been the case since 2003.

== Voting procedure ==
The three field umpires (those umpires who control the flow of the game, as opposed to goal or boundary umpires) confer after each match and award three votes, two votes, and one vote to the players they regard as the best, second-best and third-best in the match, respectively. The votes are kept secret until the awards night, and they are read and tallied on the evening.
