= 1938 Brownlow Medal =

- Winner: Dick Reynolds (Essendon); 18 votes

The 1938 Brownlow Medal was the 15th year the award was presented to the player adjudged the fairest and best player during the Victorian Football League (VFL) home-and-away season. Dick Reynolds of the Essendon Football Club won the medal by polling eighteen votes during the 1938 VFL season.

== Leading votegetters ==
	Player	Votes
1st	Dick Reynolds (Essendon)	18
2nd	Stan Spinks (Hawthorn)	17
=3rd	Marcus Boyall (Collingwood)	15
=3rd	Wilfred Smallhorn (Fitzroy)	15
=3rd	Alby Morrison (Footscray)	15
6th	Jock Cordner (North Melbourne)	14
=7th	Norman Ware (Footscray)	13
=7th	Jack Collins (Geelong)	13
=9th	Jim Park (Carlton)	12
=9th	Des Fothergill (Collingwood)	12
=9th	Marcus Whelan (Collingwood)	12
=9th	Gordon Jones (Melbourne)	12
