= 1932 Brownlow Medal =

- Winner: Haydn Bunton Sr. (Fitzroy); 23 votes

The 1932 Brownlow Medal was the ninth year the award was presented to the player adjudged the fairest and best player during the Victorian Football League (VFL) home and away season. Haydn Bunton of the Fitzroy Football Club won the medal for the second consecutive year by polling twenty-three votes during the 1932 VFL season.

== Leading votegetters ==
	Player	Votes
1st	Haydn Bunton Sr. (Fitzroy)	23
=2nd	George Moloney (Geelong)	16
=2nd	Bill Faul (South Melbourne)	16
4th	Ivan McAlpine (Footscray)	15
=5th	Stan Judkins (Richmond)	12
=5th	Jack Dyer (Richmond)	12
=5th	Percy Beames (Melbourne)	12
=5th	John Lewis (North Melbourne)	12
=9th	Fred Phillips (St Kilda)	10
=9th	Reg Hickey (Geelong)	10
=9th	Wilfred Smallhorn (Fitzroy)	10
=9th	Gordon Strang (Richmond)	10
