= 1931 Brownlow Medal =

- Winner: Haydn Bunton (Fitzroy); 26 votes

The 1931 Brownlow Medal was the eighth year the award was presented to the player adjudged the fairest and best player during the Victorian Football League (VFL) home and away season. Haydn Bunton of the Fitzroy Football Club won the medal by polling twenty-six votes during the 1931 VFL season.

Following the previous season's three-way tie, and the confusion which followed, the conditions governing the medal were amended. From this season, the umpire would award votes to the best three players on the ground – three votes to the best player, two to the second best, and one to the third best. The player with the most overall votes would win; in the event of a tie, the player with the most three-vote games would win, then the player with the most two-vote games. A new provision under which a player who had been suspended during the season became ineligible for the award was also added.

== Leading votegetters ==
	Player	Votes
1st	Haydn Bunton Sr. (Fitzroy)	26
2nd	Allan Hopkins (Footscray)	25
3rd	Reg Hickey (Geelong)	19
4th	John Lewis (North Melbourne)	17
=5th	Stan Judkins (Richmond)	15
=5th	Percy Beames (Melbourne)	15
=5th	Ivan McAlpine (Footscray)	15
8th	Fred Phillips (St Kilda)	14
=9th	Harold Rumney (Collingwood)	11
=9th	Ernest Utting (Hawthorn)	11
=9th	Harold Matthews (St Kilda)	11
=9th	Colin Martyn (Carlton)	11
=9th	Howard Okey (Essendon)	11
