= Wally Ware =

Australian rules footballer, born 1906

Personal information
- Full name: Walter Leslie Ware
- Born: 19 March 1906; Sale, Victoria
- Died: 15 January 1994 (aged 87); Footscray, Victoria
- Original team: Sale Football Club
- Height: 187 cm (6 ft 2 in)
- Weight: 87 kg (192 lb)

Playing career^{1}
Years	Club	Games (Goals)
1930–34	Hawthorn	63 (27)
- ^{1} Playing statistics correct to the end of 1934.

Walter Leslie Ware (19 March 1906 – 15 January 1994) was an Australian rules footballer who played with Hawthorn in the Victorian Football League (VFL).

Originally from Sale, Victoria. His younger brother Norman Ware, played and coached Footscray, winning the Brownlow Medal in 1941.
