= Col Laidlaw =

Australian rules footballer

Personal information
- Full name: Robert Colin Laidlaw
- Born: 16 September 1896; Kensington, Victoria
- Died: 25 January 1985 (aged 88); Melbourne, Victoria
- Original team: Williamstown Juniors
- Height: 173 cm (5 ft 8 in)
- Weight: 71 kg (157 lb)

Playing career^{1}
Years	Club	Games (Goals)
1919–23	Essendon	41 (16)
1924	Footscray (VFA)	16 (0)
1925–26	Footscray	25 (1)
Total		82 (17)
- ^{1} Playing statistics correct to the end of 1926.

Robert Colin Laidlaw (16 September 1896 – 25 January 1985) was an Australian rules footballer who played with Essendon and Footscray in the Victorian Football League (VFL).
