= 1926 Brownlow Medal =

Victorian Football League player award

- Winner: Ivor Warne-Smith (Melbourne); 9 votes

The 1926 Brownlow Medal was the third year the award was presented to the player adjudged the fairest and best player during the Victorian Football League (VFL) home and away season. Ivor Warne-Smith of the Melbourne Football Club won the medal by polling nine votes during the 1926 VFL season.

== Leading votegetters ==
	Player	Votes
1st	Ivor Warne-Smith (Melbourne)	9
=2nd	Edward Greeves (Geelong)	5
=2nd	Bob Johnson (Melbourne)	5
=2nd	Allan Geddes (Richmond)	5
=5th	Reg Baker (Collingwood)	4
=5th	Garnet Campbell (Essendon)	4
=5th	Bill Adams (Fitzroy)	4
=5th	Dave Walsh (North Melbourne)	4
=5th	Keith Millar (Richmond)	4
=10th	Alex Duncan (Carlton)	3
=10th	Syd Coventry (Collingwood)	3
=10th	Leo Dwyer (North Melbourne)	3
