= 1998 Brownlow Medal =

- Winner: Robert Harvey (St Kilda); 32 votes

Television/radio coverage
- Network: Seven Network

The 1998 Brownlow Medal was the 71st year the award was presented to the player adjudged the fairest and best player during the Australian Football League (AFL) home-and-away season. Robert Harvey of the St Kilda Football Club won the medal for the second consecutive year by polling 32 votes during the 1998 AFL season.

Harvey's tally of 32 votes tied Herbie Matthews's and Des Fothergill's long-standing 1940 record for most votes in a season under the 3–2–1 voting system.

== Leading vote-getters ==
	Player	Votes
1st	Robert Harvey (St Kilda)	32
2nd	Nathan Buckley (Collingwood)	24
3rd	Scott West (Western Bulldogs)	23
4th	Shaun Rehn (Adelaide)	22
5th	Mark Ricciuto (Adelaide)	21
=6th	Todd Viney (Melbourne)	20
=6th	Wayne Carey (Kangaroos)	20
8th	Ben Cousins (West Coast)	18
	Fraser Brown (Carlton)*	18
	Matthew Knights (Richmond)*	18
	Shane Crawford (Hawthorn)*	17
=9th	Tony Lockett (Sydney)	15
=9th	Wayne Schwass (Sydney)	15

* The player was ineligible to win the medal due to suspension by the AFL Tribunal during the year.
