= Roy Wright (footballer) =

Australian rules footballer

Personal information
- Born: 23 February 1929
- Died: 30 July 2002 (aged 73)
- Original team: North Kew FC
- Height: 188 cm (6 ft 2 in)
- Weight: 102.5 kg (226 lb)

Playing career^{1}
Years	Club	Games (Goals)
1946–1959	Richmond	195 (127)
- ^{1} Playing statistics correct to the end of 1959.

Career highlights
- Brownlow Medallist 1952, 1954; Richmond Best and Fairest 1951, 1952, 1954, 1957; Richmond Captain 1958-1959; Interstate Games:- 18; All Australian: 1956; Richmond - Team of the Century; Richmond - Hall of Fame - inducted 2002; Australian Football Hall of Fame

Gordon "Roy" Wright (23 February 1929 – 30 July 2002) was an Australian rules football player with the Richmond Football Club in the VFL during the 1940s and 1950s, and television personality during the 1960s.

The inspiration of the story of Roy Wright, nicknamed the "Gentle Giant", was of a triumph over childhood adversity. As a child, Wright had to wear splints on his legs to overcome weak knees. Later struck down with rheumatic fever, doctors prevented Wright from playing competitive sport until he was sixteen years of age.

At this point, in 1945, friends persuaded Wright to try out with local team North Kew in the strong Eastern Districts Football League. Wright had a dream start in the game, winning the league's best and fairest award, an achievement so eye-catching that talent scouts from the VFL were soon looking the youngster over. Richmond won his signature and he arrived at Punt Road for the 1946 VFL season, quite a rise for a man who hadn't played the game twelve months before.

Wright cut a noticeable figure, with his huge frame (188 cm and over 100 kg) and golden blond hair. In the post-war era, all VFL clubs were valiantly scouring the country, looking for big men capable of dominating the rucks and giving their team first use of the ball at ball-ups and boundary throw-ins. The boundary throw-in disappeared from the game after a 1925 rule change, but the rule reverted to its original form during the war, therefore increasing the emphasis on ruck play. The Tigers could see Wright's rare ability but, due to his truncated early career, felt he still needed to learn the subtleties of the game. Besides, in Jack Dyer and Bill Morris, Richmond already possessed the best ruck combination in the competition.

Dutifully, Wright played in the reserves but missed many games through injury. In his first three seasons, he managed just 26 senior games and frustration manifested. On a number of occasions in the late 1940s, Wright requested an open clearance from the club and on one occasion had gone to Glenferrie Oval to meet the Hawthorn players in anticipation of playing there. Eventually, opportunities opened up. Dyer retired at the end of the 1949 season, a year when Wright managed 15 games, an achievement he matched the following season as he gradually began to make a name for himself.

Season 1951 provided the breakthrough point for the young ruckman. Given more time on the ball than Bill Morris, he played every game and tied with Des Rowe for the club's best and fairest. When Bill Morris retired at the end of the year, it paved the way for Wright to assume the mantle of number one ruck. In 1952, Wright dominated the season, winning nineteen votes in the Brownlow medal to tie for first place with Essendon's Bill Hutchison. The prevailing system gave Wright the award, although Hutchison was given a retrospective medal in 1989.

Wright experienced a quieter season in 1953 as Richmond slumped to the club's lowest ever finish on the ladder. However, he bounced back the following year to lead a late-season charge for the finals by the Tigers. The bid failed, but the Richmond supporters took plenty of pride from the Brownlow medal count when Wright polled a massive 29 votes to win by a record ten votes. Now hailed as the best big man in the game, Wright stood out among a plethora of star ruckmen who he battled every week, men such as Neil Mann, Dennis Cordner and Jack Howell.

Unfortunately for both Wright and the club, the team's fortunes continued to wane. In the years immediately after the war, the Tigers made a habit of finishing just outside the finals. The lack of winning experience combined with a lack of aggressive recruiting lowered expectations around the club, and by the mid-1950s Richmond were regulars at the bottom of the ladder. Wright's form shone like a beacon amid the mediocrity.

Between 1952 and 1957, Wright was the first choice as ruckman for the Victorian team; he totalled eighteen games in the Big V. Fellow players, commentators and opposition fans alike admired Wright's fair and sportsmanlike approach to the game. Wright's sheer size and fierce concentration often circumvented potential trouble - few opponents were willing to tangle with the big man. Apart from his exquisite ability to direct his hit-outs straight to teammates, Wright excelled at the contested mark and rarely let down a teammate who sent the ball in the air his way. He could kick long and accurately, once recording a 73-metre punt kick in a game at Punt Road. In every way, Roy Wright was the quintessential "mark and kick" (or "prop and cop") 1950s footballer.

Wright continued winning honours as the team continued to struggle. In 1956, after dominating the ruck for Victoria in the interstate carnival, he was named an All-Australian. His last big year was 1957 when he won a fourth club best and fairest and came close to winning a third Brownlow medal, finishing second to Brian Gleeson by four votes. No other Richmond player has won more than one Brownlow in the yellow and black.

After succeeding Des Rowe as captain in 1958, luck deserted Wright. Injury hampered his season and the following year, an injured leg forced him to announce his retirement and deny him an on-field farewell. Aged 30, he was stranded just five games short of the 200-game milestone.

Wright maintained his involvement with football by becoming one of the early television commentators on the game. He worked predominantly with the ABC and presented Wright on the Ball for most of the 1960s. Roy and his wife June lived in Carnegie until the mid 1970s when they moved to Rosebud with their children Kerryn and Paul. During the 1980s following his separation from his wife June, Roy permanently moved to his holiday "shack" in Paynesville (Victoria) which he had loved and often visited over many years. Despite the obvious distance, Roy was always available to attend Richmond functions and fundraisers, where his autograph was in big demand. The supporters of his era never forgot the "Gentle Giant."

In 1996, the AFL inducted Wright into the hall of fame as a founding member. The Richmond Team of the Century, announced in 1998, named Wright as the first ruckman, ahead of his mentor and first coach, Jack Dyer - arguably his greatest accolade.
