= Cyril Gambetta =

Personal information
- Full name: Cyril Leonard Gambetta
- Born: 1 August 1899; Eaglehawk, Victoria
- Died: 20 August 1974 (aged 75); Elwood, Victoria
- Original team: Sandhurst
- Height: 180 cm (5 ft 11 in)
- Weight: 80 kg (176 lb)

Playing career^{1}
Years	Club	Games (Goals)
1921	Hawthorn (VFA)	12 (33)
1922–1931	St Kilda	129 (75)
- ^{1} Playing statistics correct to the end of 1931.

Career highlights
- St Kilda best player award 1925

Cyril Leonard Gambetta (1 August 1899 – 20 August 1974) was an Italian-Australian rules footballer who played with St Kilda in the Victorian Football League (VFL). Due to having suffered from polio as a child he had badly bowed legs which gave him an awkward running style.

Gambetta came to Melbourne from Sandhurst in Bendigo at the start of the 1921 season. After being refused a clearance to St Kilda, he joined Hawthorn Football Club in the Victorian Football Association (VFA) where he played as a forward.

The next season, he joined St Kilda where he spent most of his time as a key position defender and was twice chosen to represent Victoria at interstate football. He won St Kilda's best player award in 1925 and finished equal sixth in the 1928 Brownlow Medal.

In June, 1925, Benalla Football Club offered Gambetta their coaching job, but St.Kilda refused to clear him
