= Bill Hutchison =

Australian rules footballer, born 1923

Personal information
- Full name: William Henry Hutchison
- Born: 28 April 1923; Kensington, Victoria
- Died: 18 June 1982 (aged 59)
- Original team: Westmeadows
- Height: 5 ft 9 in (174 cm)
- Weight: 11 st 0 lb (70 kg)

Playing career^{1}
Years	Club	Games (Goals)
1942–1957	Essendon	290 (496)
- ^{1} Playing statistics correct to the end of 1957.

Career highlights
- Essendon premiership side: 1942, 1946, 1949–1950; Essendon captain: 1951–1957; Brownlow Medal winner: 1952 and 1953; Essendon best and fairest: 1946, 1948, 1950, 1952-1953, 1955–1956; Essendon Team of the century; Australian Football Hall of Fame member (legend status); All-Australian Team: 1953 and 1956

William Henry Hutchison (28 April 1923 – 18 June 1982), often referred to as "Hutchy", was an Australian rules footballer in the Victorian Football League (VFL) with the Essendon Football Club, who played 290 VFL games, from 1942 to 1957, and kicked 496 goals.

Generally considered one of the finest rovers ever to play the game, he captained Essendon from 1951 to 1957, and was a vital part of Essendon's premiership sides in 1942, 1946, 1949 and 1950.

== Family ==
The son of Scottish parents, Henry Kearton Hutchison (1884–1962) and Agnes Caskie Hutchison (1889–1977), née Brown, William Henry Hutchison was born at Kensington on 28 April 1923. He married Helen Isabel "Nell" Giles (1923–2011) in 1947.

== Football career ==
Hutchison played with Essendon from 1942 to 1957.

=== Debut ===
He made his First XVIII debut on 16 May 1942 as a wingman, against Footscray, in Round 2 of the 1942 season; originally listed as an emergency, he was a last-minute replacement for the unavailable Les Griggs.

=== Interstate (VFL) ===
Selected in every season from 1945 to 1954, inclusive, and again in 1956, Hutchison played 30 games for Victoria and kicked 67 goals. He was selected in the All-Australian team in both 1953 and 1956, the two years in which he also captained Victoria at the ANFC Carnivals in Adelaide and Perth, respectively. He was also selected on eight separate occasions in the Sporting Life Team of the Year: 1947, 1948, and 1950–1955.

=== Last match ===
His last match was against Melbourne in the 1957 VFL Grand Final. He was captain and first rover in the Essendon team that lost to Melbourne 7.13 (55) to 17.14 (116). He retired after the Grand Final, and he did not participate in the end-of-season night football competition that was held immediately after the final series.

== Brownlow Medal ==
Once established as a rover, he consistently polled well in the Brownlow Medal vote count: (Note: Due to the unavailability of many of the best players due to service in World War II, there was no Brownlow Medal voting in Hutchison's first four League seasons from 1942 to 1945.)

- Polling 8 votes in 1946 (winner, Don Cordner).
- Finishing ninth to Bert Deacon in 1947.
- Finishing third to Bill Morris in 1948.
- Finishing eighth to Ron Clegg, who won on a count-back from Col Austen, in 1949.
- Finishing sixth to Allan Ruthven in 1950.
- Finishing third to Bernie Smith in 1951.
- Finishing equal first with Roy Wright in 1952. (Note: Although their total votes and their "first votes" were equal, their "second votes" were not, and Wright (with more "second votes" and less "third votes" than Hutchison) was awarded the medal on a countback according to the rules that applied at the time; however, those rules were changed in 1989, and Hutchison was retrospectively (and posthumously) awarded a Brownlow medal for the 1952 season.)
- Finishing first in 1953.
- Polling 10 votes in 1954 (winner, Roy Wright).
- Finishing second, by one vote, to Fred Goldsmith in 1955.
- Polling 9 votes in 1956 (winner, Peter Box).
- Polling 5 votes in 1957 (winner, Brian Gleeson).

== Death ==
He died on 18 June 1982, after a short illness.

== Legacy ==
=== Champions of Essendon ===
In 2002, at a "Champions of Essendon" gala event, Hutchison was voted the fourth-greatest Essendon player of all time. The man who was voted Champion, Dick Reynolds, famously said: "I don't deserve this honour... Bill Hutchison was the best player I've seen."

=== Australian Football Hall of Fame ===
In 2003, Hutchison was inducted as the 18th "Legend" in the Australian Football Hall of Fame.

=== W. Hutchison Medal ===
The W. Hutchison Medal is awarded annually to the best and fairest player in the First Division of the Essendon District Football League.
