= Colin Watson (footballer) =

Australian rules footballer (1900–1970)

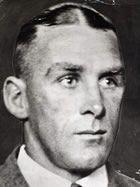

Personal information
- Full name: Colin Campbell Watson
- Born: 12 October 1900; Allansford, Victoria
- Died: 20 May 1970 (aged 69); Tatura, Victoria
- Original teams: South Warrnambool, Port Melbourne
- Debut: Round 1, 1920, St Kilda vs. Carlton
- Height: 180 cm (5 ft 11 in)
- Weight: 82.5 kg (182 lb)

Playing career^{1}
Years	Club	Games (Goals)
1919	Port Melbourne	7 (0)
1920, 1922–25, 1933–35	St Kilda	93 (34)
Total		100 (69)

Coaching career
Years	Club	Games (W–L–D)
1934	St Kilda	18 (9–9–0)
- ^{1} Playing statistics correct to the end of 1935.

Career highlights
- St Kilda Champion Player award 1924; Brownlow Medallist 1925; Victorian state representative 8 times; Maryborough Premiership Coach: 1927; Western District Football Association Best & Fairest Medal: 1930 & 1932; St Kilda captain 1934

Colin Campbell Watson (12 October 1900 – 20 May 1970) was an Australian rules footballer in the Victorian Football League.

Watson was best on ground for South Warrnambool in the 1918 Warrnambool District Football Association grand final and was enticed down to Melbourne in 1919 where he played seven consecutive games from rounds three to nine with VFA side Port Melbourne, when a bout of influenza at the height of the 1919 Influenza pandemic forced him home to Warrnambool, where he finished off the season with South Warrnambool.

Roy Cazaly went down to coach South Warrnambool during the 1919, 1920 and 1921 finals series and coached Colin Watson and immediately saw an immensely talented footballer, who was then invited to play with St. Kilda in 1920.

He played four games for St Kilda in 1920 (rounds 1, 3, 5 & 7) before deciding to stay at home in Warrnambool and in 1921 he played in South Warrnambool's Western District Football Association premiership, coached by Roy Cazaly.

Watson then returned to St Kilda in June, 1922, where his career finally took off. Watson played with St Kilda in various positions, predominantly on the half back line or across the centre.

Watson represented Victoria for the first time against South Australia on the MCG in 1923, with a near best on ground performance!

Watson played against South Australia at the MCG in August, 1925 on the wing.

He was outstanding in the 1924 interstate carnival, representing Victoria in each of their five games.

Watson won the Brownlow medal in 1925 and was regarded as the best footballer in the VFL.

In October, 1925, only days after winning the Brownlow Medal, Watson accepted a job in Stawell as an Inspector with Equitable Life Assurance Company, then in early 1926, he accepted the position of captain-coach of Stawell, but St Kilda, perhaps not surprisingly, refused to clear him.

After standing out of football during the 1926 season, Watson was appointed as captain / coach of country club, Maryborough in 1927 without a clearance, and the Ballarat Football League was disqualified by the VFL as a consequence.

Watson played and coached Maryborough to the 1927 Ballarat Football League premiership., but resigned in February 1928.

Watson was disqualified by the VFL for three years and did not play any football in 1928 and 1929, due to his clearance dispute with St. Kilda and his disqualification imposed by the VFL for playing for Maryborough without a clearance.

Watson took up foot running to keep fit during the late 1920s and competed in a number of rural athletic race meeting.

Watson finally returned to the football field with his home town club of South Warrnambool as captain / coach in 1930, after the VFL lifted his disqualification and St. Kilda granted him a permit. Watson won the 1930 Western District Football Association best and fairest gold medal.

In the 1931 Western Districts FA semi final, South Warrnambool captain / coach, Colin Watson was best on ground, but suffered a fractured jaw against Portland. He was once again best on ground the following week in the Preliminary Final against Hamilton. South Warrnambool lost the 1931 grand final to arch rivals Warrnambool by two points, with Watson best on ground.

Watson once again led South Warrnambool into the 1932 grand final, but they were defeated by Hamilton, with Watson playing another starring role. Watson also won the 1932 Western District Football Association best and fairest gold medal.

He returned to St Kilda in 1933 and was captain-coach of the side in 1934. Watson represented Victoria in a match against South Australia, in Adelaide in 1934.

In 1935 he left St. Kilda after the first game of the season and returned to South Warrnambool as their captain-coach.

In 1936, Watson took on the captain-coach position at Cobden Football Club. Watson did not initially want to continue on a coach of Cobden in 1937, due to work commitments on his dairy farm at Cudgee, but did stay on a player and eventually ended up as captain / coach in 1937, 1938 and 1939.

In August 1937, Watson purchased a large farm property at Ecklin, near Cobden, thus his reason for finishing off his illustrious and at times controversial football career at Cobden.

In 1950, Watson coached Yarra Glen's reserves side, but they lost the Yarra Valley Football League grand final to Healesville.

Watson was inducted into the Australian Football Hall of Fame in 1996 and into the Saints inaugural Hall of Fame in 2003.
