= Fred Goldsmith (Australian footballer) =

Australian rules footballer

Personal information
- Born: 20 August 1932
- Died: 13 April 2017 (aged 84)
- Original team: Spotswood (FDFL)
- Height: 183 cm (6 ft 0 in)
- Weight: 83 kg (183 lb)
- Positions: Full-back, full-forward

Playing career^{1}
Years	Club	Games (Goals)
1951–1959	South Melbourne	119 (107)
1960-1965	Albury	? (270)
1966	Port Melb	7 (35)
Total		126 (142)
- ^{1} Playing statistics correct to the end of 1959.

Career highlights
- 1955 Brownlow Medalist; 1956 Simpson Medalist; 1957 South Melbourne leading goalkicker (43); 1964 O&MFL leading goalkicker (81); 2003 Swans "Team of the Century"

Fred Goldsmith (20 August 1932 – 13 April 2017) was an Australian rules footballer who played with South Melbourne in the Victorian Football League (VFL).

Goldsmith as a seventeen year old in 1950, he kicked 140 goals for Spotswood to head the goalkicking table in the Footscray District Football League, including kicking 29 goals in a match for Spotswood against Kingsville. His club was zoned to South Melbourne.

== VFL career ==
A fireman, Goldsmith started his career in 1951 as a half forward flanker, having been recruited by South Melbourne from Spotswood.

In 1952, he was shifted to fullback; and, in 1955, he became the first ever (and so far, only) specialist fullback to win the Brownlow Medal.

To the astonishment of all, in 1956, South Melbourne decided to play its 1955 Brownlow Medallist fullback at full-forward. He played at full-forward for the remainder of his career. In 1957, he was South Melbourne's leading goalkicker with 43 goals.

== Post VFL career ==
At 27 years of age, he was appointed as captain-coach of the Albury Football Club, in the Ovens & Murray Football League and coached them from 1960 to 1965 and kicked 270 goals in that time.

Goldsmith led the O&MFL goalkicking in 1964 with 81 goals for the season.

In 1966 he played seven games with Port Melbourne Football Club in the Victorian Football Association.

Goldsmith's 1955 Brownlow Medal attained $43,700 at an auction of sporting memorabilia conducted by Christie's on 17 April 2000.

He was selected as an interchange player in the South Melbourne/Sydney Swans's "Team of the Century"' announced on 8 August 2003.

In a 1958 competition, held at the Lake Oval, Goldsmith kicked a drop kick that travelled (80 yd 1 ft; 241 ft; 73 m).

Fred Goldsmith has five children, 16 grandchildren and 13 great-grandchildren
