= Neil Mann (Australian footballer) =

Australian rules footballer and coach

Personal information
- Born: 26 August 1924
- Died: 21 February 2013 (aged 88)
- Original team: St Kilda Thirds
- Debut: 1945, Collingwood vs. North Melbourne, at Victoria Park, Melbourne
- Height: 188 cm (6 ft 2 in)
- Weight: 83 kg (183 lb)

Playing career^{1}
Years	Club	Games (Goals)
1945–1956	Collingwood	179 (155)

Coaching career
Years	Club	Games (W–L–D)
1960, 1967, 1972–74	Collingwood	72 (49–22–1)
- ^{1} Playing statistics correct to the end of 1956.

Neil Mann (26 August 1924 – 21 February 2013) was an Australian rules footballer, who played for Collingwood in the Victorian Football League (VFL). He was a premiership player with them in 1953.

Mann was a key position player and won Collingwood's best and fairest in 1954. He also finished second in 1948 and again in 1953. Mann also polled well in the Brownlow Medal, finishing runner-up in 1954 after being third the previous season. He was Collingwood vice-captain from 1950 to 1955 and was a captain in 1956. He represented Victoria at interstate football from 1954 until 1956. In 1972, after 14 years as coach of the Collingwood reserves, he stepped up to coach the league side, spending three years as the senior coach.

Mann died on 21 February 2013 after battling ill health in recent years.
