= Allan Ruthven =

Australian rules footballer and coach

Personal information
- Full name: Allan Gordon Ruthven
- Born: 17 April 1922; Fitzroy, Victoria
- Died: 14 March 2003 (aged 80); Wangaratta, Victoria
- Original team: Falconer Street School
- Height: 173 cm (5 ft 8 in)
- Weight: 73 kg (161 lb)

Playing career^{1}
Years	Club	Games (Goals)
1940–1954	Fitzroy	222 (442)

Coaching career
Years	Club	Games (W–L–D)
1952–1954	Fitzroy	57 (28–28–1)
- ^{1} Playing statistics correct to the end of 1954.

Career highlights
- Brownlow Medal: 1950; Fitzroy captain: 1948, 1950–1954; 5× Fitzroy Club Champion: 1944, 1945, 1946, 1948, 1949; 3× Fitzroy leading goalkicker: 1944, 1945, 1954; Australian Football Hall of Fame; Fitzroy team of the century

Allan Gordon Ruthven (17 April 1922 – 14 March 2003) was an Australian rules footballer in the Victorian Football League. He played his entire 222-game career with Fitzroy. In 1950, Ruthven won the prestigious Brownlow medal.

== Playing career ==
Ruthven was the nephew of Victoria Cross winner William Ruthven, who was a Collingwood supporter. His uncle took him to trial with Collingwood, but they rejected him. A product of Falconer Street School in North Fitzroy, Ruthven subsequently joined Fitzroy in 1940 as a 17-year-old schoolboy star. So impressed with his skill and potential, the club subsequently gave Ruthven guernsey number 7, previously worn and made famous by triple Brownlow Medallist, Haydn Bunton.

Universally known as "the Baron", for his dapper dress sense, Ruthven reportedly earned his nickname when a teammate called out "here comes Baron Rothschild" after he turned up to the club in one of his flamboyant suits.

Ruthven stood only 173 centimetres tall and weighed 73 kilograms, but was renowned for his skill, fitness and flawless left-foot kicking. Tough, talented and tenacious, Ruthven was also renowned for his ability to gain possession of the ball under the most challenging of circumstances, and use it purposefully. He was also dangerous near goal, winning Fitzroy's goal kicking award on three occasions. Considered the greatest rover of the 1940s and early 1950s, Ruthven was instrumental in Fitzroy's 1944 premiership win.

His illustrious career was one which nearly ended before it reached its prime. In 1942, Ruthven spent three months in hospital recovering from a serious back injury and missed the entire season. However, he bounced back from injury and in 1946 won Victorian selection for the first time and a league newspaper award as the best player of the year.

Fitzroy almost lost Ruthven in 1949 after the Imperial Football Club offered him £18 a week to be captain/coach. Although he accepted, becoming one of the highest paid coaches in Victoria, Fitzroy refused him clearance, claiming that Imperial had approached Ruthven after they had denied permission to interview him for the position. Eventually, Fitzroy won a protracted battle to keep him. Shortly afterwards, Broken Hill offered Ruthven £36 a week; £20 as a player, £8 as the coach and a weekly bonus of £8. Again Fitzroy refused to clear Ruthven and again the controlling body upheld Fitzroy's claim.

In 1950, Ruthven was reappointed captain after Norm Smith retired as a player. Ruthven responded by winning the Brownlow medal with 21 votes, 3 clear of the next player. In 1952, Ruthven was appointed captain/coach, taking Fitzroy to the preliminary final. One of the highlights of Ruthven's career as captain/coach was when he steered the side to a 1-point victory over Carlton in the 1952 first semi-final. Fitzroy won the game despite having 9 fewer scoring shots at goal than the Blues, with Ruthven snapping the match-winning behind in the dying seconds of the game, in a best on ground performance.

In 1953 Fitzroy scored their lowest-ever score against Footscray, Ruthven late snap at goal was the team's only score for the game.

He retired at the end of the 1954 season after 222 games over 15 seasons, finishing second on the club's all-time games list behind Frank Curcio, at the time of his retirement. Ruthven's 97 career Brownlow votes ranks in the top 5 of Fitzroy's all-time playing list.

== Career highlights ==
=== Playing career ===
- Fitzroy: 1940–1941, 1943–1954 (Games 222; Goals 442; Brownlow votes 97).

=== Player honors ===
- Brownlow Medal: 1950.
- Fitzroy best and fairest: 1944, 1945, 1946, 1948, 1949.
- Fitzroy club leading goalkicker: 1944, 1945, 1954.
- Fitzroy captain: 1948, 1950–1954.
- Fitzroy premiership: 1944
- Victorian representative: (17 games, 47 goals)

=== Coaching record ===
- Fitzroy 1952–1954 (57 games, 28 wins, 28 losses, 1 draw).

=== Post-career recognition ===
- 1998: Ruthven was inducted into the Australian Football Hall of Fame.
- 3 May 2001: Ruthven was named in Fitzroy's Team of the Century, in the forward line.
- 2007: Brisbane Lions recognised Ruthven as one of the two greatest Fitzroy players from the era 1927 to 1956. The other player being Haydn Bunton.

== Post career ==
After retiring as a player, Ruthven became a household name when he appeared as a regular panelist on the Channel 7 television show, World of Sport. In later life, Ruthven retired with his wife to the country life of Yarrawonga, in rural Victoria, where he continued to play his other favourite sport, golf.

Ruthven was also a vocal supporter of the Brisbane Lions, after the 1997 merger of Fitzroy and the Brisbane Bears. He was involved in the official unfurling ceremony of the Lions' 2001 premiership flag in Melbourne in April 2002, but failing health prevented him from being a part of the Lions' successful national tour with the 2002 premiership cup.

== Passing ==
On 14 March 2003, 34 days short of his 81st birthday, Ruthven died after suffering a stroke at Wangaratta Hospital. He was buried at St Brigid's Catholic Church, Mulwala.

== See also ==
- List of Brownlow Medal winners
- Fitzroy FC honour roll
- List of Fitzroy Football Club coaches
- Australian rules footballers with 200 games for one club
