= Stan Judkins =

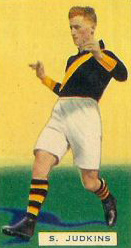

Personal information
- Full name: Stanley Lucas Judkins
- Born: 4 October 1907; Fitzroy, Victoria, Australia
- Died: 17 October 1986 (aged 79)
- Original team: Greensborough/Northcote (VFA)
- Debut: 1928, Richmond vs. Geelong
- Height: 166 cm (5 ft 5 in)
- Weight: 61 kg (134 lb)

Playing career^{1}
Years	Club	Games (Goals)
1928–1936	Richmond	133 (5)
- ^{1} Playing statistics correct to the end of 1936.

Career highlights
- Brownlow Medallist 1930; Richmond Premiership Player 1932, 1934; Interstate Games: 1; Albury Premiership Captain-Coach: 1937

Stan Judkins (4 October 1907 – 17 October 1986) was an Australian rules footballer who played for the Richmond Football Club in the Victorian Football League between 1928 and 1936. He became the first Richmond player to win the game's most prestigious award, the Brownlow Medal.

Judkins played his junior football as a rover for Greensborough and then moved to Northcote in the VFA for the 1926 season. Invited to Richmond the following year, Judkins was forced to remain in the VFA for one more season due to clearance problems, caused by a dispute between the two competitions. Eventually, he made his way to Punt Road in 1928, and he immediately became a first team regular, aged 20. He arrived at the club at the start of a golden era, and starred in the Tigers' semifinal win over Carlton, but was quiet during the loss to Collingwood in the Grand Final three weeks later.

A diminutive man at 166 cm and 61 kg, Judkins was a typical wing player of his era. At this time, teams generally used small, pacy men with good ground skills in the position. Judkins also earned praise for his handball and evasive ability; he was a hard man to tackle.

Judkins missed the Tigers' 1929 finals appearance due to injury, but started the next season in blistering form, which eventually petered out. Dropped from the side five weeks before the finals, Judkins languished in the seconds, unaware he was about to make history and change the way the game would decide its best player award. In 1924, the VFL instituted the Charles Brownlow Medal, to honour a recently deceased Geelong player and official. It was decided by the umpires, who gave a single vote to the player they believed to be the best afield. In 1930 the award carried little ceremony – the winner was notified by mail and told to come and collect the award from the VFL office.

On the Wednesday after the last game of the 1930 home and away season, the votes were tallied and Judkins was tied in first place with Harry Collier (Collingwood) and Allan Hopkins (Footscray) with a meagre tally of four votes. By comparison, the lowest previous tally to win had been six votes. Two nights after the counting, the umpires board (which administered the award) recommended that no medal be awarded as there was no provision for a tied result.

However, a week later, Judkins was sitting at home when his father came in to show him a copy of a newspaper that contained an article stating Judkins had won the Brownlow Medal. Judkins was notified by the VFL to come and collect his prize and that was that. Judkins was more excited by the prospect of playing on the Saturday, when he had been recalled to the Richmond side to take on Collingwood in the semifinal. Encouraged by the award, he played a great game, but the Tigers lost a thrilling contest by three points.

It transpired that the VFL administration had overruled the umpires board and used a criterion that stated the medal be awarded to the player who played the fewest games. Judkins' banishment to the seconds had won him the award. It has been claimed that a vote simply labelled "Collier" was found, but as there were two Collier brothers playing in the game, the vote was not counted. To remedy the situation for the future, the rules were altered to a 3–2–1 system in 1931. The countback rule was created, providing for two players with equal votes to be separated and this system (apart from 1976–77) endured until 1981, when the countback was abolished. Finally, in 1989, retrospective medals were given out to all players who lost the award on a countback, including Hopkins and Collier.

Today, Judkins remains the only Brownlow Medallist to have been dropped during the year he won the award. He is the shortest and lightest player to have won the medal. Although a regular in a champion team, Judkins did not garner any other major individual awards during his career.

From 1930 to 1935, Judkins formed one of the great centrelines in the game, teaming with centreman Eric Zschech and fellow wingman Allan Geddes. Richmond relied heavily on stability and reliability to achieve success, and being able to select the same centreline every week helped tremendously. The trio played in four consecutive Grand Finals together, winning premierships in 1932 and 1934. Judkins averaged 14 possessions in the four Grand Finals. His outstanding finals effort in this period came in the 1934 semifinal against Geelong. Judkins played a single game for Victoria and totalled ten finals for the club. He continued to catch the eye of the umpires, polling well in the 1931 and 1932 Brownlow counts when he finished equal fifth both times.

At the end of 1936, when the Tigers missed the finals for the first time during his career, Judkins left VFL football at the age of 29. He had a brief stint in the Ovens and Murray Football League as a playing coach, notably leading the strong Albury club to the premiership in 1937.

Judkins was captain-coach of Drouin in 1938.

In 1939 and 1940, Judkins was captain-coach of Hamilton in the Western District Football League where they were runners up in 1939.

Judkins enlisted in the Second AIF in 1942 and saw action in Borneo.

After the war, he was central in establishing the VFL's thirds (Under 19) competition, and in 1949 he was coach of VFA club Sandringham. Judkins was given life membership at Richmond in 1962. Richmond's three other Brownlow winners were given this honour before they finished playing. He later coached Brighton Amateurs and was involved with junior clubs in the Sandringham area. His son Noel played in the Under-19s for Richmond, became an administrator with the Tigers and was later headhunted by Kevin Sheedy to oversee recruiting at Essendon. During a long career, Noel Judkins gained a reputation as one of the best talent-spotters of the modern era.

Stan Judkins died in 1986.
