= Peter Box =

Australian rules footballer (1932–2018)

Personal information
- Born: 22 March 1932
- Died: 15 August 2018 (aged 86)
- Original team: Wesley College, Melbourne
- Height: 180 cm (5 ft 11 in)
- Weight: 79 kg (174 lb)

Playing career^{1}
Years	Club	Games (Goals)
1951–1957	Footscray	107 (43)
1958	Camberwell	11 (5)
Total		118 (48)
- ^{1} Playing statistics correct to the end of 1957.

Career highlights
- VFL premiership: 1954; Brownlow Medal: 1956; Charles Sutton Medal: 1955

Peter Box (22 March 1932 – 15 August 2018) was an Australian rules footballer who played with Footscray in the Victorian Football League (VFL) during the 1950s.

Box arrived at Footscray from Cheltenham, where he won the 1950 Federal Football League best and fairest award and made his VFL debut in 1951.

He missed the entire 1952 season through injury after the motor cycle he was riding was hit by a motorist and he suffered critical head and leg injuries.

Box returned and played his best football from 1953 onwards. Although he was used mainly as a centreman, Box played at centre half-forward in Footscray's 1954 premiership side. By winning the Brownlow Medal in 1956 Box became the only Footscray premiership player to win the medal. The previous year he won his club's Best and Fairest award.

Box played with Camberwell in the Victorian Football Association (VFA) in 1958 and won their best and fairest award.

Box was captain-coach with Grong Grong Matong Football Club in the South Western District Football League from 1959 to 1961 and won the 1959 South Western District Football League best and fairest award, the Gammage Medal.

Box then coached Narrandera Football Club in the South Western District Football League from 1962 to 1964 and later played in their 1966 premiership side.

Box returned to play with Grong Grong Matong Football Club from 1967 to 1969, to finish off a fine football career.

Box was inducted into the Footscray Hall of Fame in 2018.

Box was educated at Wesley College, Melbourne.

== Links ==
- Peter Box's playing statistics from AFL Tables
- Peter Box at AustralianFootball.com
- Peter Box Player Profile via The VFA Project
- 1961 - South Western District FL team photo
- 1966 - South Western District FL Premiers: Narrandera Imperials FC team photo
