= Ivor Warne-Smith =

Australian rules footballer

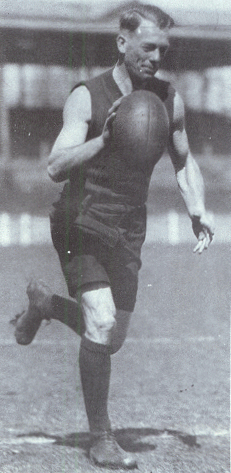

Personal information
- Full name: Ivor Phillip Scharrer Warne-Smith
- Born: 29 October 1897; Sydney, Australia
- Died: 4 March 1960 (aged 62); Newport, Victoria
- Original team: Wesley College, Melbourne
- Height: 182 cm (6 ft 0 in)
- Weight: 86 kg (190 lb)

Playing career^{1}
Years	Club	Games (Goals)
1919	Melbourne	8 (2)
1920–1924	Latrobe (NWFU)	75
1925–1932	Melbourne	138 (108)
Total		221 (110)

Representative team honours
Years	Team	Games (Goals)
1926–1929	Victoria	6 (0)

Coaching career
Years	Club	Games (W–L–D)
1922–1924	Latrobe (NWFU)	
1928–1932	Melbourne	92 (48–42–2)
- ^{1} Playing statistics correct to the end of 1932.

Career highlights
- VFL premiership: 1926; 2× Brownlow Medallist: 1926, 1928; Melbourne captain: 1928–1931; Melbourne Team of the Century (centre half-forward); Australian Football Hall of Fame; Melbourne Hall of Fame (legend status); Tasmanian Team of the Century

Ivor Warne-Smith (29 October 1897 – 4 March 1960) was an Australian footballer who played for the Melbourne Football Club in the Victorian Football League and for the Latrobe Football Club in the North-Western Football Union in Tasmania. During his time with Melbourne he won two Brownlow Medals, played in their 1926 premiership side, was captain-coach of the club and represented his state of Victoria on numerous occasions. Warne-Smith remained involved with the club for the rest of his life and was named in the Melbourne Football Club Team of the Century. He was also named in the Tasmanian Team of the Century. Warne-Smith fought in both World War I and World War II.

== Early life ==
Warne-Smith was born in Sydney and moved to Melbourne with his family when he was a child. His mother Naomi Scharrer was Jewish. He was educated at Wesley College, where he was noted as a footballer and cricketer. In 1914 he received "triple honour colours" at Wesley, for showing "exceptional commitment to the team and an outstanding level of skill in the specific sport" in three separate sports. As a teenager he played for Collegians in the Metropolitan Amateur Football Association.

== WWI ==
Warne-Smith enlisted in World War I on 14 May 1915. More than two years below enlistment age, he pretended to be 18. He served at Gallipoli and on the Western Front. Two of his three brothers were killed in the war.

== Football career ==
=== Victorian Football League ===
On returning to Melbourne in 1919 Warne-Smith joined the Melbourne Football Club, in the VFL and played eight games at centre halfback in that season.

=== North-Western Football Union ===
In 1920 he moved to Latrobe in Tasmania, where he became an orchardist. From 1920 to 1924 he played with the Latrobe Diehards football club in the Tasmanian North-Western Football Union (NWFU), and was captain-coach from 1922 onwards. Latrobe were premiers in 1922 and 1924 and runners up in 1923. In 1923 and 1924 he was runner-up in the NWFU's Cheel Medal for the best and fairest player. He was captain of the NWFU representative team in statewide competition, and was selected to play for Tasmania in the 1924 national carnival, although he was unable to play.

=== Back to the VFL ===
By 1924 Warne-Smith had such a reputation that Victorian teams were keen to bring him back to Melbourne, despite the fact that he was 27. In 1925 he returned to the Melbourne club, where he played a further 146 games, usually in the backline. He was also a talented ruckman and could play in the centre or forward line if required. Under his leadership Melbourne won the premiership in 1926, the club's first since 1900. In 1926 Warne-Smith won his first Brownlow Medal and his second in 1928. From 1928 to 1931 he was captain and coach. He played for Victoria against other state sides from 1926 to 1929, and was captain of the state team in 1928 and 1929. He retired as a player at the end of 1931, coached the club in 1932 and played in several games that season when other players were unavailable.

== Life after football ==
After retiring from football Warne-Smith became a regular football writer for the Melbourne Argus newspaper and worked as an executive with the Vacuum Oil Company (later absorbed by Mobil).

=== WWII ===
On the outbreak of World War II, he rejoined the Army (having been initially rejected on the grounds that he was too old at 43). He served with the Royal Australian Army Service Corps, in charge of fuel supplies, in the Middle East, the Northern Territory, New Guinea and Borneo. For his leadership during the Borneo operations, he was mentioned in dispatches. He was demobilised in October 1945.

=== Chairman of selectors ===
In 1949 Warne-Smith became chairman of selectors for the Melbourne Football Club, a post he held until his death. He was also elected to the committee of the Melbourne Cricket Club, which at this time controlled the Melbourne Football Club. These were the most successful years in Melbourne's history. Under coach Norm Smith Melbourne won premierships in 1955, 1956, 1957 and 1959. Warne-Smith was Smith's closest advisor and was regarded as the club's elder statesman, becoming a life member in 1952. He retired due to ill health in 1959.

== Death ==
Warne-Smith died of heart disease in 1960.

== Legacy ==
Warne-Smith won the Brownlow Medal twice: in 1926, and again in 1928. He was the first player to win the medal twice, and one of eleven to have won the Brownlow in the same year that his team won the premiership.

In June 2000 Warne-Smith was named to the position of centre half-forward in the Melbourne Football Club's Team of the Century, in a ceremony attended by his four grandsons. In 2004 he was named in the official Tasmanian Team of the Century. He was also made a member of the Australian Football Hall of Fame in 1996.

"Ivor Warne-Smith, quiet and unassuming, was nonetheless energetic and enthusiastic in his endeavours to keep the Team up to the mark. The Club is fortunate indeed in having such a brilliant and versatile player as Coach and leader. Old and new Players alike treat his advice and instructions with the utmost respect."

"For solid, effective brilliance, Ivor Warne-Smith will always rank as one of the best players the game has known. He can play anywhere. The ruck, defence, attack, or centre positions all come alike to this brainy, sterling footballer.", quoted by Sporting Globe Football Book, 1930.

== See also ==
- 1927 Melbourne Carnival
