= Bill Morris (Australian rules footballer) =

Australian rules footballer & coach (1921–1960)

Personal information
- Full name: James William McClaren Morris
- Born: 24 April 1921; Culcairn, New South Wales
- Died: 25 May 1960 (aged 39); Malvern East, Victoria
- Original team: Old Scotch / Melbourne Seconds
- Height: 188 cm (6 ft 2 in)
- Weight: 86 kg (190 lb)

Playing career^{1}
Years	Club	Games (Goals)
1942–1951	Richmond	140 (98)
- ^{1} Playing statistics correct to the end of 1951.

Career highlights
- 1948 Brownlow Medalist

James William McLaren Morris (24 April 1921 – 25 May 1960) was an Australian rules footballer who played for Richmond in the Victorian Football League (VFL), mostly during the 1940s. He played much of his football beside Jack Dyer as a knock ruckman.

== Career ==
Morris started his career with the Melbourne reserve team but before he could make an impression he decided to join the army. He returned to football in 1942 and was traded to Richmond and made his senior debut that year. In 1945 he won the first of his three Best and Fairest awards, the others coming in 1948 and 1950.

Morris won the Brownlow Medal for the best player in the VFL in 1948, joining Stan Judkins as the only Richmond players to win the Medal to that time. He polled well in other Brownlow Medal nights, finishing equal second in 1946 and equal third in 1950. He was a regular Victorian interstate representative, playing a total of 15 games and captaining the state in 1950. He was also captain of Richmond, leading the club in 1950 and 1951.

On 3 April 1950 Morris married Jill Tolley, of Adelaide's wealthy Tolley family.

At the end of the 1951 season Morris left Richmond and joined VFA Club Box Hill as captain-coach. He captain-coached Box Hill from 1952 to 1954, winning the Club's Best and Fairest each season. He played 58 games for Box Hill and scored 101 goals.

== Recognition ==
In 2002 Morris was inducted into the Richmond Hall of Fame and he is also a member of their official 'Team of the Century', being named in the forward pocket. He is also a member of Box Hill's official 'Greatest Ever Team' as announced in 2000, selected as first ruck.

On 1 June 2009, Morris was inducted to the AFL Hall of Fame.

== Death ==
Morris committed suicide in 1960, at the age of 39. Morris, who was recently separated from his wife, had threatened to do himself harm days before he died. His body was discovered by his wife in the living room dressed in night attire. There was gas leaking out of the oven and the heater.
