= John James (Australian rules footballer) =

Australian rules footballer, born 1934

Personal information
- Full name: John James
- Nickname: Johnny
- Born: 18 January 1934
- Died: 8 December 2010 (aged 76); Robinvale, Victoria
- Original team: St Patrick's College
- Height: 175 cm (5 ft 9 in)
- Weight: 81 kg (179 lb)
- Position: Half back flank

Playing career^{1}
| Years | Club | Games (Goals) |
| 1953–1963 | Carlton | 195 (31) |

Representative team honours^{2}
| Years | Team | Games (Goals) |
| 1955–1962 | Victoria | 15 (?) |
- ^{1} Playing statistics correct to the end of 1963.^{2} Representative statistics correct as of 1962.

Career highlights
- Brownlow Medal: 1961; Carlton best and fairest: 1955, 1960, 1961

John James (18 January 1934 – 8 December 2010) was a leading Australian rules footballer in the Victorian Football League (VFL). He won the Brownlow Medal, the highest individual honour in the sport, in 1961.

Recruited from St. Patrick's College, Ballarat where in one match in 1952, he kicked 35 goals against Ballarat High School.

James played for the Carlton Football Club from 1953 to 1963, playing 195 games. He finished third in the 1957 Brownlow Medal count and won the award in 1961. He won the Carlton Best and Fairest three times (in 1955, 1960 and 1961). James was named on the half-back flank in the Carlton Team of the Century.

In his debut season, James played off a half-forward flank and booted the terribly inaccurate figures of eight goals, 43 behinds. Throughout his career he played in a variety of positions, including the backline. After his retirement in 1963, he went to coach Robinvale in the Sunraysia Football League.

James died in Robinvale, Victoria, on 8 December 2010, following a stroke.
