= Norman Ware =

Australian rules footballer, born 1911

Norm Ware
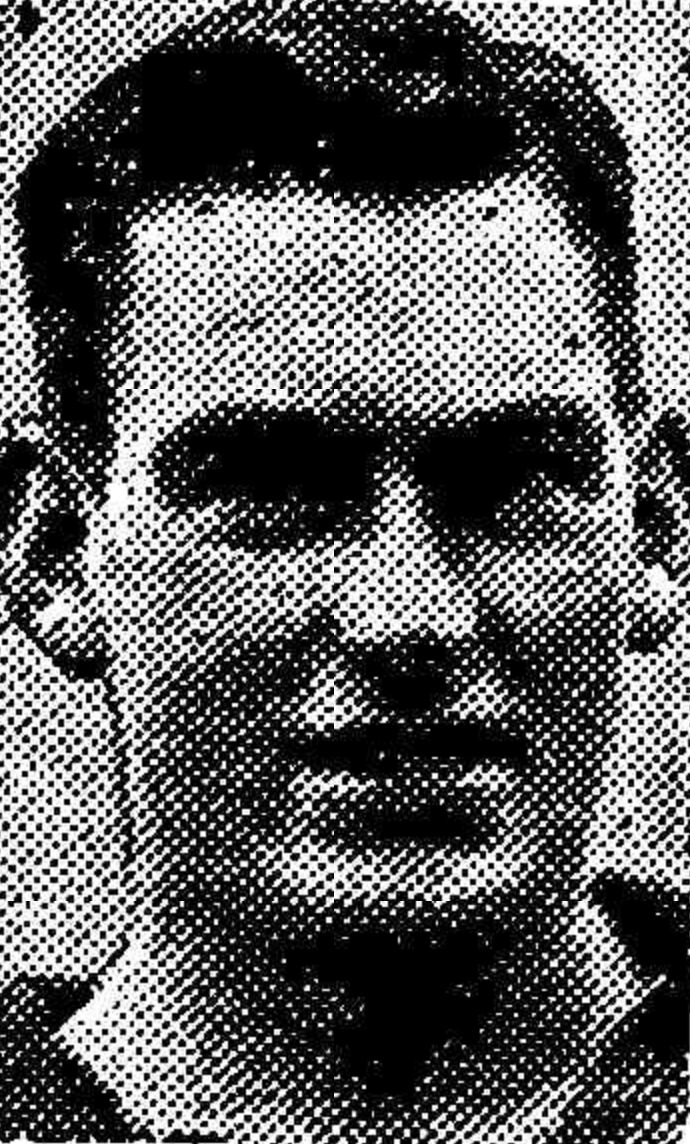
- Ware in 1942

Personal information
- Full name: Norman Ware
- Born: 5 March 1911
- Died: 26 August 2003 (aged 92)
- Original team: Sale
- Height: 193 cm (6 ft 4 in)
- Weight: 91 kg (201 lb)
- Position: Ruckman

Playing career^{1}
Years	Club	Games (Goals)
1932–1946	Footscray	200 (220)

Coaching career
Years	Club	Games (W–L–D)
1941–1942	Footscray	33 (20–13–0)
- ^{1} Playing statistics correct to the end of 1946.

Career highlights
- Brownlow Medal: 1941; Footscray captain: 1941–1942; 5× McCarthy trophy/Con Curtain trophy: 1934, 1937, 1938, 1940, 1941; Footscray leading goalkicker: 1942

Norman Ware (5 March 1911 – 26 August 2003) was an Australian rules footballer in the Victorian Football League (VFL).

A ruckman for Footscray, Ware is the only person to have won the Brownlow Medal while being both captain and coach. He is likely to remain so indefinitely, as it would be highly unlikely for a captain of an AFL team to act as a coach today, due to salary cap regulations implemented in 1987 in order to prevent wealthier clubs from circumventing the restrictions of the salary cap and salary floor. Additionally, while captain-coaches used to be relatively common in earlier years of the game, the practice has been phased out, with the last captain-coach of an AFL team being Alex Jesaulenko in 1979 and the last player-coach being Malcolm Blight in 1981.

He was recruited from Sale. His brother Wally played for Hawthorn.

In 2001 Ware was inducted into the Australian Football Hall of Fame.

== Career highlights ==
- Brownlow Medal: 1941
- Footscray Best and Fairest: 1934, 1937, 1938, 1940, 1941, 1942
- Footscray captain: 1940
- Victorian representative (10 games, 6 goals)
- Footscray Team of the Century (2002)
- Footscray-Western Bulldogs Hall of Fame: Legend (2018)
- Australian Football Hall of Fame (2001)
