= Allan Hopkins =

Australian rules footballer, born 1904

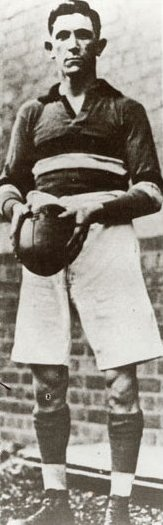

Personal information
- Full name: Allan Arthur Hopkins
- Born: 24 May 1904; Footscray, Victoria
- Died: 2 July 2001 (aged 97); Yarrawonga, Victoria
- Original team: Footscray (VFA)
- Height: 175 cm (5 ft 9 in)
- Weight: 75 kg (165 lb)

Playing career^{1}
Years	Club	Games (Goals)
1925–1934	Footscray	151 (205)
1935-1940	Yarraville Football Club	54 (55)
Total		205 (260)

Coaching career
Years	Club	Games (W–L–D)
1930	Footscray	18 (4–14–0)
- ^{1} Playing statistics correct to the end of 1934.

Career highlights
- Footscray captain: 1926, 1929–1930; McCarthy trophy: 1931; 2× Footscray leading goalkicker: 1925, 1926; Victorian representative 17 matches

Allan Hopkins (24 May 1904 – 2 July 2001) was an Australian rules footballer in the (then) Victorian Football League.

== Football ==
He started off his career with Footscray Football Club before they joined the Victorian Football League (VFL) in 1925. He had played in the club's 1923 and 1924 premiership sides in the Victorian Football Association (VFA).

A brilliant centreman, he was awarded the Brownlow Medal retrospectively in 1989 for the 1930 season while playing with the Footscray Bulldogs, and won the Bulldogs' best and fairest in 1931.

He went on to win the VFA premiership with Yarraville Football Club in 1935 as captain-coach. He died aged 97 in 2001. At that time he was the oldest player in the game's history, but was later surpassed by Carlton's Keith Rae who lived to 104.
