= Herbie Matthews =

Australian rules footballer

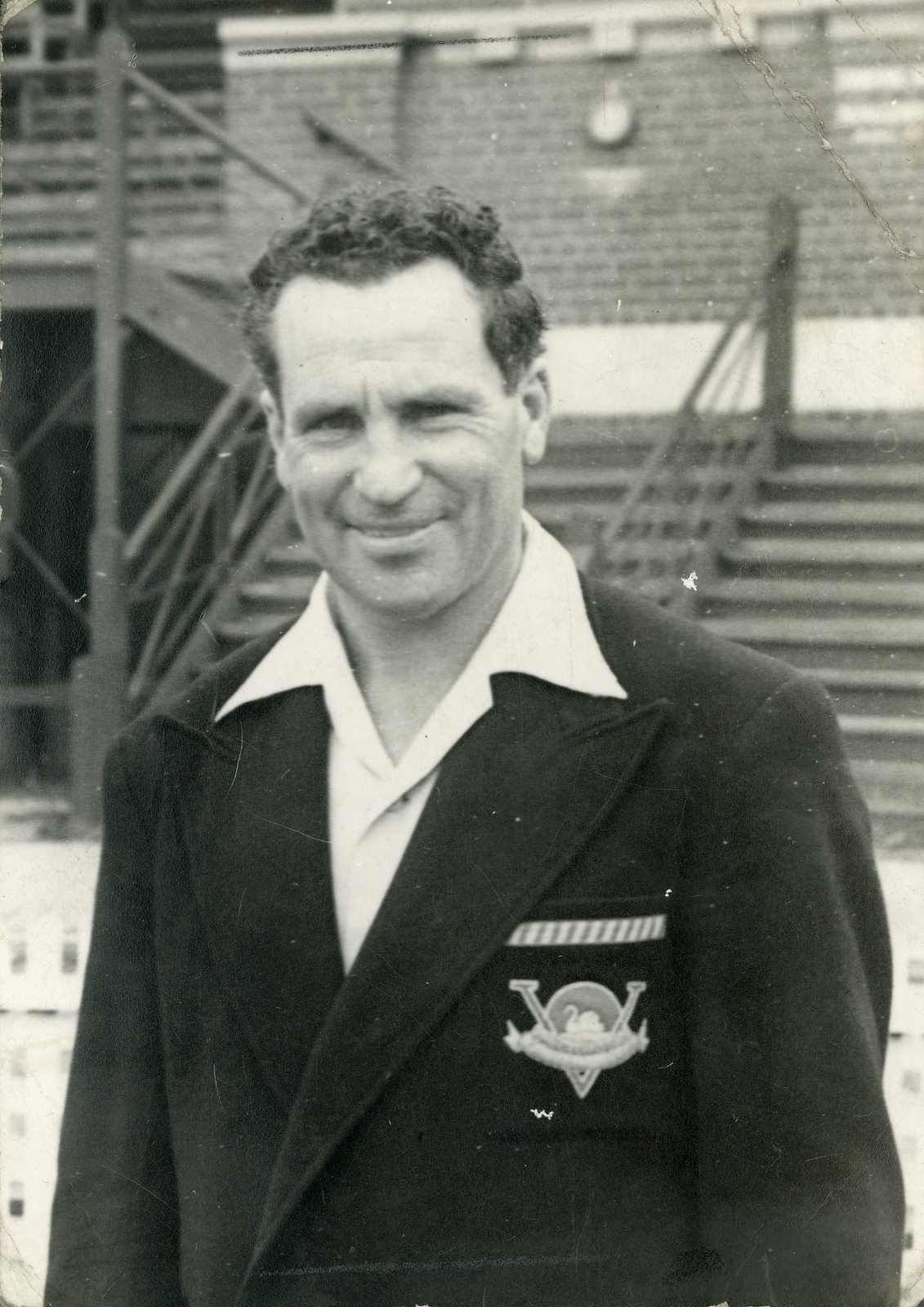

Personal information
- Full name: James Herbert Charles Matthews
- Born: 12 November 1913; Prahran, Victoria
- Died: 8 June 1990 (aged 76); Apollo Bay, Victoria
- Original team: Fairfield
- Height: 177 cm (5 ft 10 in)
- Weight: 76 kg (168 lb)
- Position: Midfielder

Playing career^{1}
Years	Club	Games (Goals)
1932–1945	South Melbourne	191 (17)

Representative team honours
Years	Team	Games (Goals)
	Victoria	4 (1)

Coaching career
Years	Club	Games (W–L–D)
1939, 1954–1957	South Melbourne	90 (27–62–1)
- ^{1} Playing statistics correct to the end of 1945.

Career highlights
- Brownlow Medal 1940; South Melbourne best and fairest 1936–37, 1939–40, 1943; South Melbourne captain 1938–45; South Melbourne/Sydney Swans Team of the Century

James Herbert Charles Matthews (12 November 1913 – 8 June 1990) was an Australian rules footballer who played for South Melbourne in the Victorian Football League (VFL). He was recruited to South Melbourne from suburban club Fairfield. His father, "Butcher" Matthews, partnered the great Roy Cazaly in South Melbourne's ruck combination of the early 1920s. Although he was smaller and slighter in build than his ruckman father, he was a strong mark and showed a ferocious drive for possession of the football. He was recruited by South Melbourne at the age of 17 in the face of determined approaches from Collingwood and his local Victorian Football Association club, Northcote.

A centreman and wingman with great pace, stamina and skills, he was awarded the Brownlow Medal in 1940 and was runner-up on another two occasions. He won his club's best and fairest award five times and captained them from 1938 until 1945.

Matthews crossed to Victorian Football Association club Oakleigh in 1946 as playing coach, and served there for two seasons.

In 1997 Matthews was inducted into the Australian Football Hall of Fame and in 2003 was named on the wing in South Melbourne's official Team of the Century.
