= Herb Henderson =

Herb Henderson may refer to:

- Herb Henderson (Australian footballer)
- Herb Henderson (American football)
- Herb H. Henderson, American attorney and civil rights activist

== See also ==
- Herbert Henderson (disambiguation)
