= Herbert Henderson =

Herbert or Herb Henderson may refer to:

- Herbert Stephen Henderson (1870–1942), Victoria Cross holder
- Herb Henderson (Australian footballer) (born 1930), Australian rules player
- Herb Henderson (American football) (1899–1991), American football player
- Herb H. Henderson, American attorney and civil rights activist

== See also ==
- Bert Henderson (disambiguation)
