= List of VFL/AFL players to have played 200 games for one club =

This is a list of players who have played at least 200 games for one club in the Australian Football League (AFL), previously known as the Victorian Football League (VFL). This list refers to premiership matches (i.e. home-and-away matches and finals matches) only; representative games (i.e. State of Origin or international rules) and pre-season/night series games are excluded.

== Adelaide ==
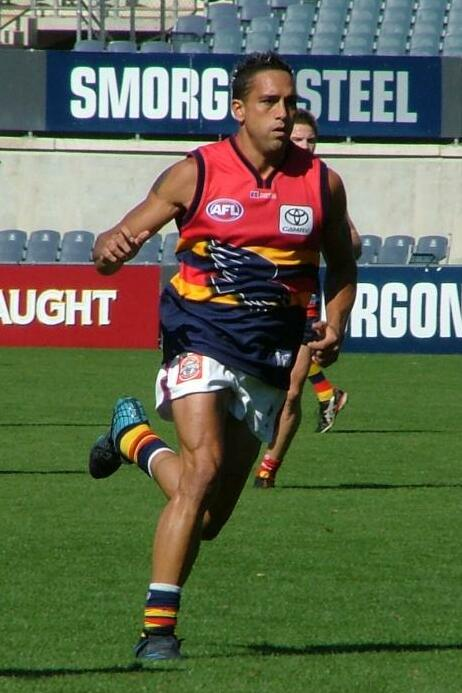
Andrew McLeod, Adelaide games record holder

Updated to the end of the 2026 season.

**Bold**	Current player

Player	Games	Seasons
Andrew McLeod	340	1995–2010
Tyson Edwards	321	1995–2010
Taylor Walker	319	2008–2026
Mark Ricciuto	312	1993–2007
Ben Hart	311	1992–2006
**Rory Laird**	**289**	**2013–present**
Nigel Smart	278	1991–2004
Simon Goodwin	275	1997–2010
Brodie Smith	273	2011–2025
Mark Bickley	272	1991–2003
Scott Thompson	269	2005–2017
Rory Sloane	255	2009–2024
David Mackay	248	2008–2021
Richard Douglas	246	2006–2019
Michael Doughty	231	2000–2012
Ben Rutten	229	2003–2014
Graham Johncock	227	2002–2013
Nathan Bassett	210	1998–2008
Nathan van Berlo	205	2005–2016
Brent Reilly	203	2002–2014
Daniel Talia	200	2010–2021

== Brisbane Lions ==
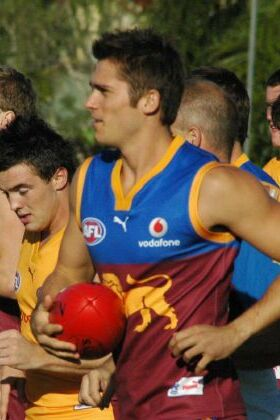
Simon Black, Brisbane Lions games record holder

Updated to the end of the 2026 season.

**Bold**	Current player

Player	Games	Seasons
Simon Black	322	1998–2013
**Dayne Zorko**	**321**	**2012–present**
Luke Power	282	1998–2011
Daniel Rich	275	2009–2023
**Harris Andrews**	**263**	**2015–present**
Jonathan Brown	256	2000–2014
**Ryan Lester**	**256**	**2011–present**
**Hugh McCluggage**	**226**	**2017–present**
Daniel Bradshaw	219	1997–2009
Nigel Lappin	218	1997–2008
Ashley McGrath	214	2001–2014
**Eric Hipwood**	**213**	**2016–present**
Jason Akermanis	210	1997–2006
Michael Voss	210	1997–2006
Tim Notting	208	1998–2009
**Charlie Cameron**	**208**	**2018–present**
Jed Adcock	206	2004–2015
**Jarrod Berry**	**206**	**2017–present**
Chris Johnson	205	1997–2007
Daniel Merrett	200	2003–2016

== Carlton ==
Updated to the end of the 2026 season.

Player	Games	Seasons
Craig Bradley	375	1986–2002
Bruce Doull	356	1969–1986
Kade Simpson	342	2003–2020
John Nicholls	328	1957–1974
Stephen Silvagni	312	1985–2001
Marc Murphy	300	2006–2021
Justin Madden	287	1983–1996
Anthony Koutoufides	278	1992–2007
Geoff Southby	268	1971–1984
David McKay	263	1969–1981
Alex Jesaulenko	256	1967–1979
Brett Ratten	255	1990–2003
**Patrick Cripps**	**255**	**2014–present**
Stephen Kernahan	251	1986–1997
Peter Jones	249	1966–1979
Peter Dean	248	1984–1998
Andrew McKay	244	1993–2003
Mark Maclure	243	1974–1986
Sergio Silvagni	239	1958–1971
Rod McGregor	236	1905–1920
Rod Ashman	236	1973–1986
Scott Camporeale	233	1995–2005
Bryce Gibbs	231	2007–2017
Ed Curnow	221	2011–2023
Rod Austin	220	1972–1985
Robert Walls	218	1967–1978
Tom Alvin	218	1984–1994
Eddie Betts	218	2005–2013, 2020–2021
**Jacob Weitering**	**218**	**2016–present**
Lance Whitnall	216	1997–2007
Heath Scotland	215	2004–2014
Ken Hands	211	1945–1957
Wayne Johnston	209	1979–1990
Trevor Keogh	208	1970–1981
Frank Gill	205	1929–1942
Harry Vallence	204	1926–1938
Barry Armstrong	204	1969–1981
Andrew Walker	202	2004–2016
Ryan Houlihan	201	2000–2011
Michael Sexton	200	1990–2000

== Collingwood ==
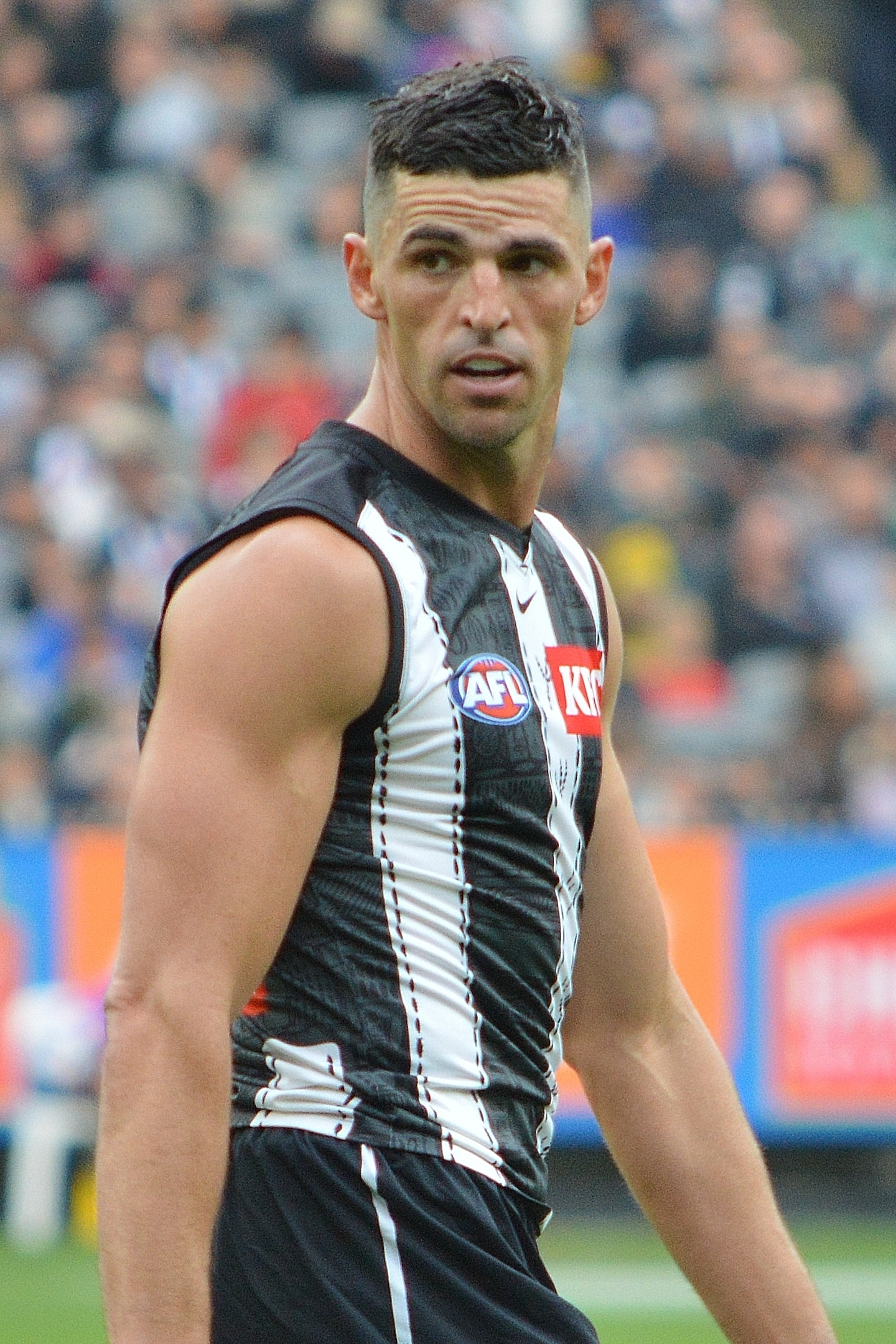
Scott Pendlebury, Collingwood games record holder

Updated to the end of the 2026 season.

^{§}	VFL/AFL games record holder
**Bold**	Current player

Player	Games	Seasons
**Scott Pendlebury**^{§}	**442**^{§}	**2006–present**^{§}
Steele Sidebottom	375	2009–2026
Tony Shaw	313	1977–1994
Gordon Coventry	306	1920–1937
**Jack Crisp**	**280**	**2015–present**
Wayne Richardson	277	1966–1978
Len Thompson	268	1965–1978
Scott Burns	264	1995–2008
Jock McHale	261	1903–1920
Nathan Buckley	260	1994–2007
Dane Swan	258	2003–2016
Gavin Brown	254	1987–2000
Harry Collier	253	1926–1940
Lou Richards	250	1941–1955
Peter Daicos	250	1979–1993
Gavin Crosisca	246	1987–2000
Travis Cloke	246	2005–2016
**Brayden Maynard**	**246**	**2015–present**
Phonse Kyne	245	1934–1950
Ben Johnson	235	2000–2013
Simon Prestigiacomo	233	1996–2010
Dick Lee	230	1906–1922
**Jamie Elliott**	**230**	**2012–present**
Syd Coventry	227	1922–1934
Tarkyn Lockyer	227	1999–2010
Shane O'Bree	227	2000–2010
Les Hughes	225	1908–1922
Leon Davis	225	2000–2011
Anthony Rocca	220	1997–2009
Alan Didak	218	2001–2013
Charlie Dibbs	216	1924–1935
Ross Dunne	213	1967–1978
Billy Picken	212	1974–1986
Max Richardson	211	1969–1978
Nick Maxwell	208	2004–2014
Albert Collier	205	1925–1939
Damian Monkhorst	205	1988–1999
**Jordan De Goey**	**204**	**2015–present**
Graham Wright	201	1988–1998
Josh Fraser	200	2000–2010

== Essendon ==
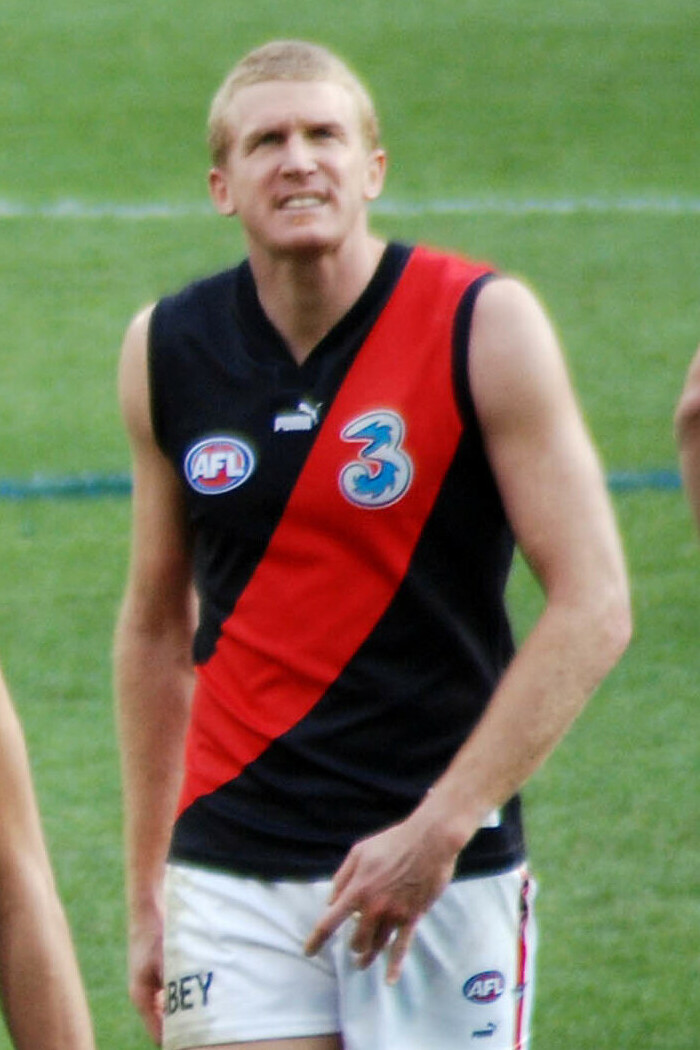
Dustin Fletcher, Essendon games record holder

Updated to the end of the 2026 season.

**Bold**	Current player

Player	Games	Seasons
Dustin Fletcher	400	1993–2015
Simon Madden	378	1974–1992
Dick Reynolds	320	1933–1951
Tim Watson	307	1977–1991, 1993–1994
Garry Foulds	300	1974–1989
Terry Daniher	294	1978–1992
Bill Hutchison	290	1942–1957
**Zach Merrett**	**274**	**2014–present**
Matthew Lloyd	270	1995–2009
Scott Lucas	270	1995–2009
Don McKenzie	266	1960–1974
Ken Fletcher	264	1967–1980
Jack Clarke	263	1951–1967
Brent Stanton	255	2004–2017
James Hird	253	1991–2007
Dyson Heppell	253	2011–2024
Gary O'Donnell	243	1987–1998
Darren Bewick	238	1988–2000
Joe Misiti	236	1992–2004
Mark McVeigh	232	1999–2012
David Zaharakis	226	2009–2021
Hugh Mitchell	224	1953–1967
Paul Salmon	224	1983–1995, 2002
Jobe Watson	220	2003–2017
Cale Hooker	219	2009–2021
Barry Davis	218	1961–1972
Mark Mercuri	207	1992–2004
Mark Harvey	206	1984–1997
Mark Thompson	202	1983–1996
Paul Vander Haar	201	1977–1990
Glenn Hawker	200	1978–1988
**Andrew McGrath**	**200**	**2017–present**

== Fitzroy ==
Player	Games	Seasons
Kevin Murray	333	1955–1974
Paul Roos	269	1982–1994
Garry Wilson	268	1971–1984
Frank Curcio	249	1932–1948
Norm Johnstone	228	1944–1957
Allan Ruthven	222	1940–1954
David McMahon	218	1973–1984
John Murphy	214	1967–1977
Warwick Irwin	213	1970–1983
Alan Gale	213	1948–1961
Michael Conlan	210	1977–1989

== Footscray/Western Bulldogs ==
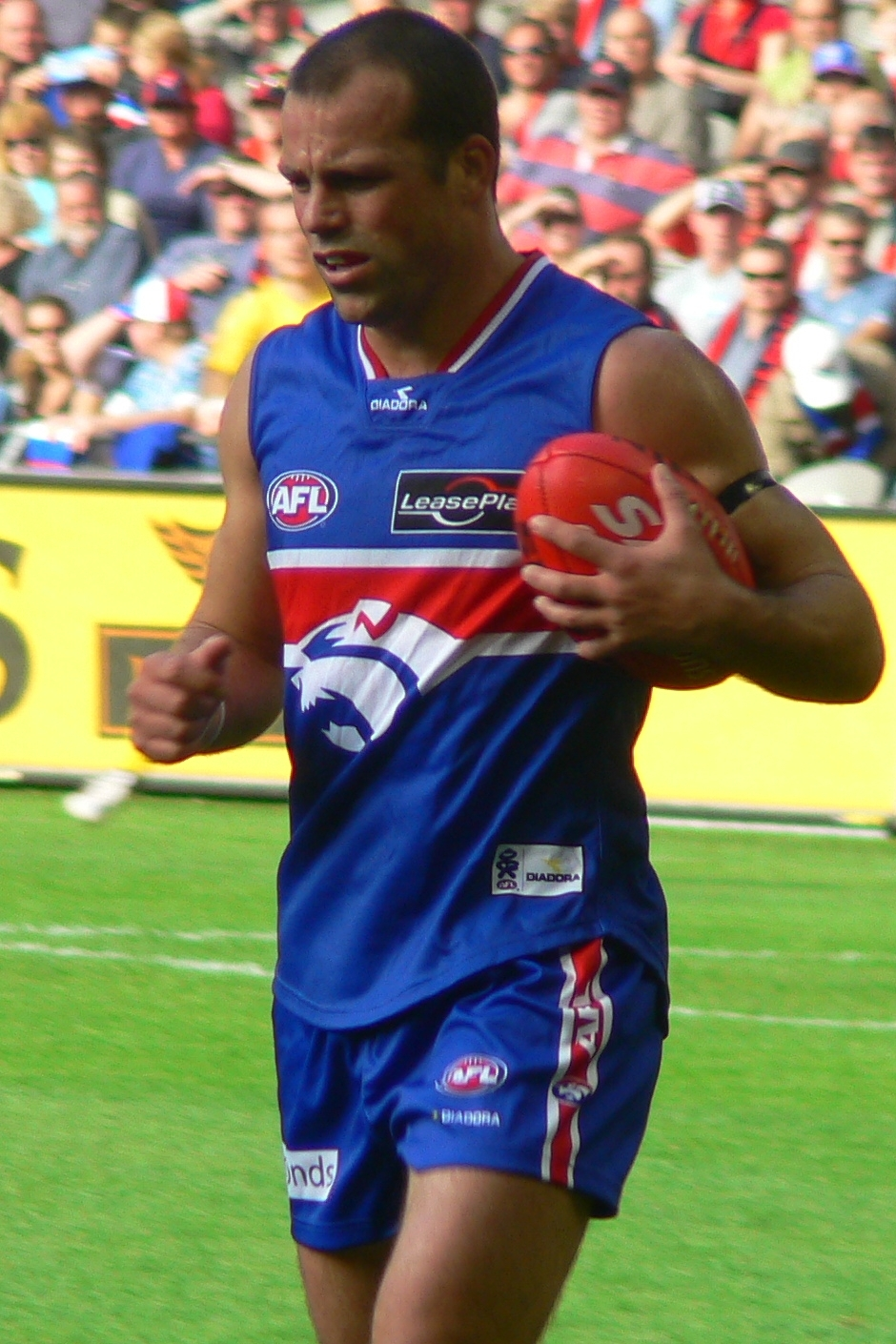
Brad Johnson, Footscray/Western Bulldogs games record holder

Updated to the end of the 2026 season.

**Bold**	Current player

Player	Games	Seasons
Brad Johnson	364	1994–2010
Chris Grant	341	1990–2007
Doug Hawkins	329	1978–1994
Scott West	324	1993–2008
Ted Whitten	321	1951–1970
Bob Murphy	312	2000–2017
Rohan Smith	300	1992–2006
Matthew Boyd	292	2003–2017
Tony Liberatore	283	1986–2002
**Marcus Bontempelli**	**282**	**2014–present**
Arthur Olliver	272	1935–1950
Tom Liberatore	268	2011–2026
Daniel Giansiracusa	265	2001–2014
Stephen Wallis	261	1983–1996
Dale Morris	253	2005–2019
Jack Macrae	249	2013–2024
Scott Wynd	237	1988–2000
Luke Darcy	226	1994–2007
Alby Morrison	224	1928–1946
Nathan Eagleton	221	2000–2010
Adam Cooney	219	2004–2014
Jason Johannisen	212	2011–2025
Daniel Cross	210	2002–2013
Gary Dempsey	207	1967–1978
Lindsay Gilbee	206	2001–2012
Wally Donald	205	1946–1958
Ryan Hargrave	203	2002–2012
Ryan Griffen	202	2005–2014
Norman Ware	200	1932–1946

== Fremantle ==
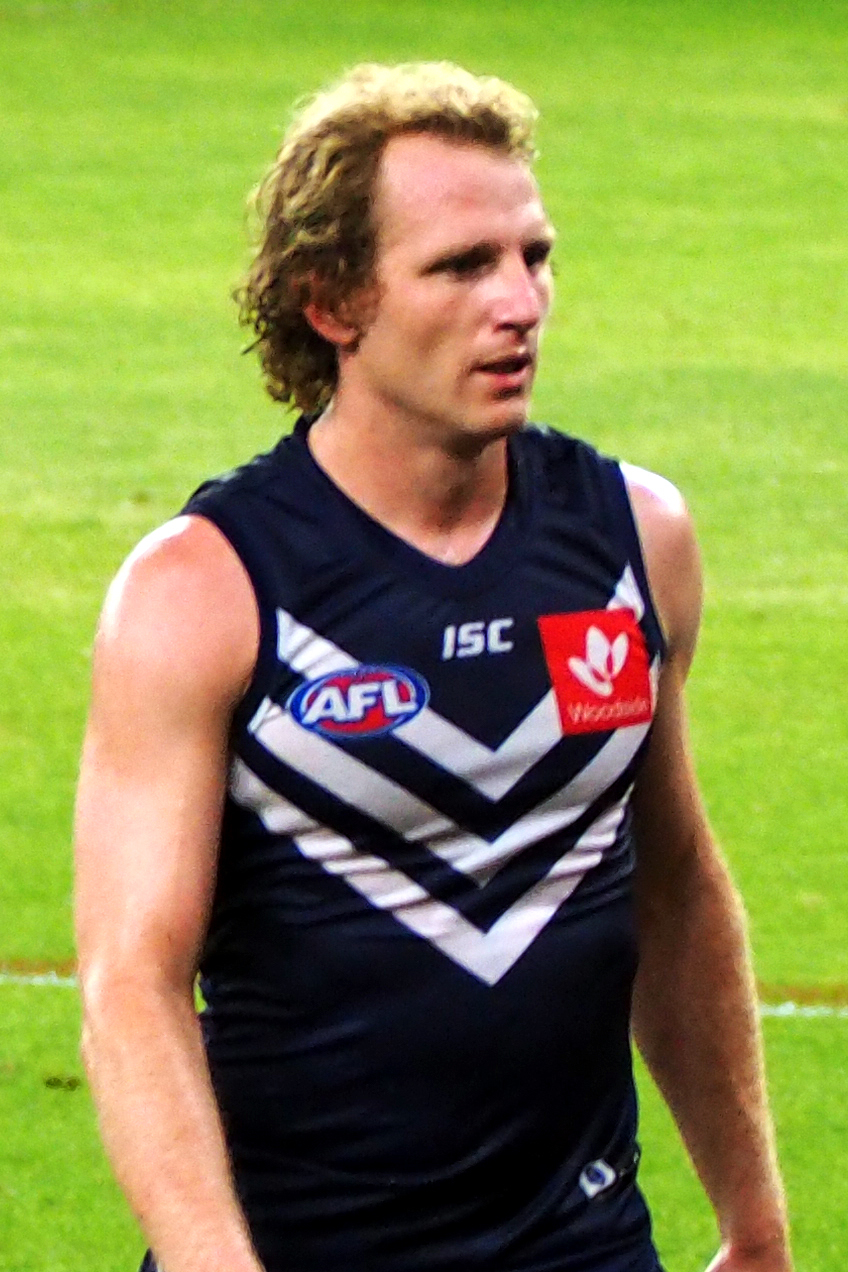
David Mundy, Fremantle games record holder

Updated to the end of the 2026 season.

**Bold**	Current player

Player	Games	Seasons
David Mundy	376	2005–2022
Matthew Pavlich	353	2000–2016
Aaron Sandilands	271	2003–2019
Nat Fyfe	248	2010–2025
Luke McPharlin	244	2002–2015
Michael Johnson	244	2005–2018
Michael Walters	239	2009–2025
Shane Parker	238	1995–2007
Shaun McManus	228	1995–2008
Stephen Hill	218	2009–2021
Paul Hasleby	208	2000–2010
**Luke Ryan**	**205**	**2017–present**
Antoni Grover	202	1999–2012

== Geelong ==
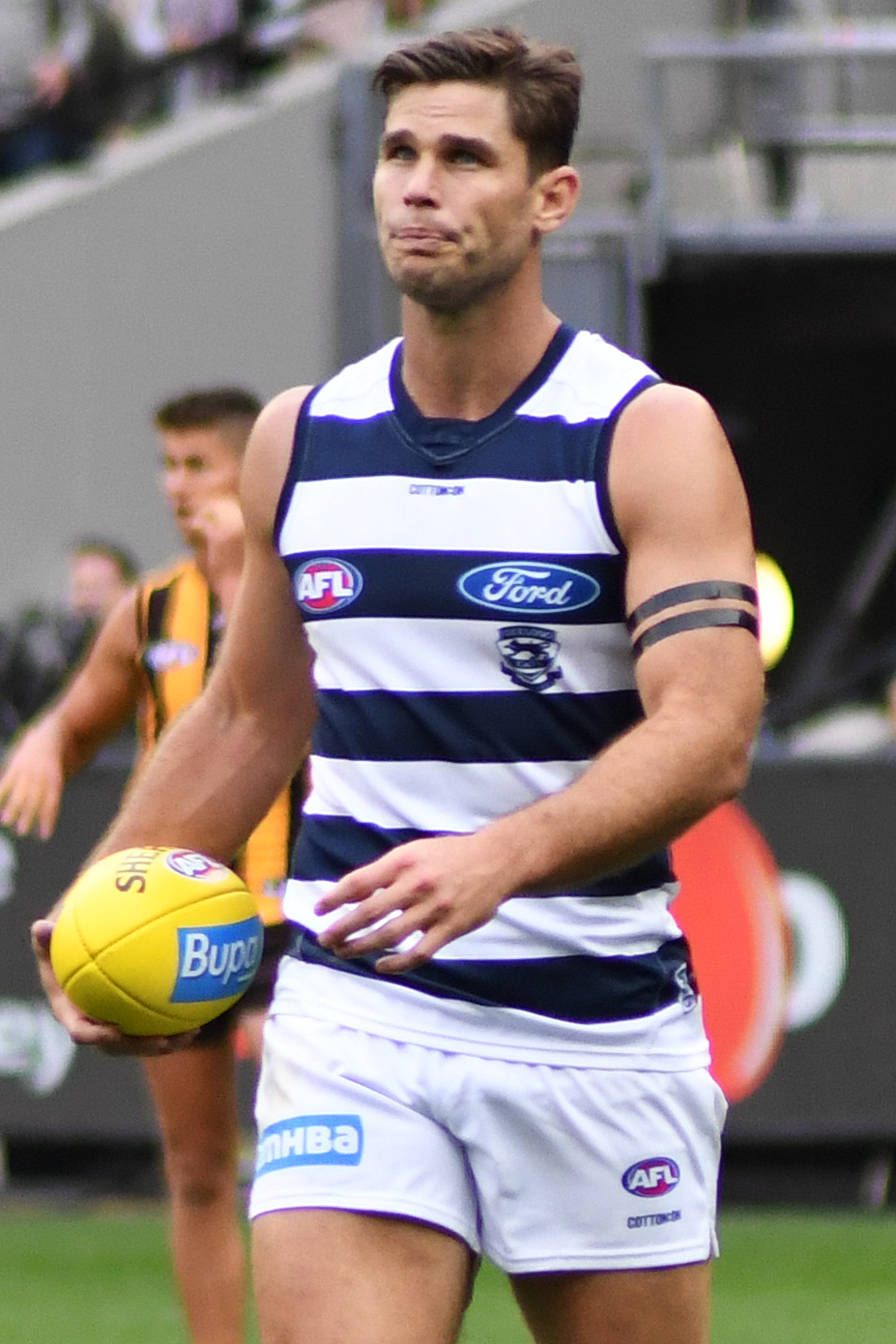
Tom Hawkins, Geelong games record holder

Updated to the end of the 2026 season.

**Bold**	Current player

Player	Games	Seasons
Tom Hawkins	359	2007–2024
Joel Selwood	355	2007–2022
Corey Enright	332	2001–2016
Ian Nankervis	325	1967–1983
**Mark Blicavs**	**315**	**2013–present**
Jimmy Bartel	305	2002–2016
Mitch Duncan	305	2010–2025
Sam Newman	300	1964–1980
Darren Milburn	292	1996–2011
Peter Riccardi	288	1992–2006
Matthew Scarlett	284	1998–2012
Andrew Mackie	280	2004–2017
Harry Taylor	280	2008–2020
Joel Corey	276	2000–2013
Garry Hocking	274	1987–2001
James Kelly	273	2002–2015
Paul Couch	259	1985–1997
Bruce Nankervis	253	1970–1983
Steve Johnson	253	2002–2015
Paul Chapman	251	2000–2013
Bill Goggin	248	1958–1971
Gary Ablett Jr.	247	2002–2010, 2018–2020
Cameron Ling	246	2000–2011
Reg Hickey	245	1926–1940
Michael Turner	245	1974–1988
Gary Ablett Sr.	242	1984–1997
Barry Stoneham	241	1986–2000
Cameron Guthrie	240	2011–2025
George Todd	232	1922–1934
**Patrick Dangerfield**	**225**	**2016–present**
Neville Bruns	223	1978–1992
Bill Eason	220	1902–1915
Terry Bright	219	1976–1987
Tim McGrath	219	1992–2002
Ben Graham	219	1993–2004
**Tom Stewart**	**214**	**2017–present**
Cameron Mooney	210	2000–2011
Tom Lonergan	209	2005–2017
**Jake Kolodjashnij**	**209**	**2014–present**
Doug Wade	208	1961–1972
Andrew Bews	207	1982–1993
David Wojcinski	203	1999–2012
David Clarke	202	1971–1981
Russell Renfrey	201	1946–1956
Robert Neal	200	1974–1986

== Gold Coast ==
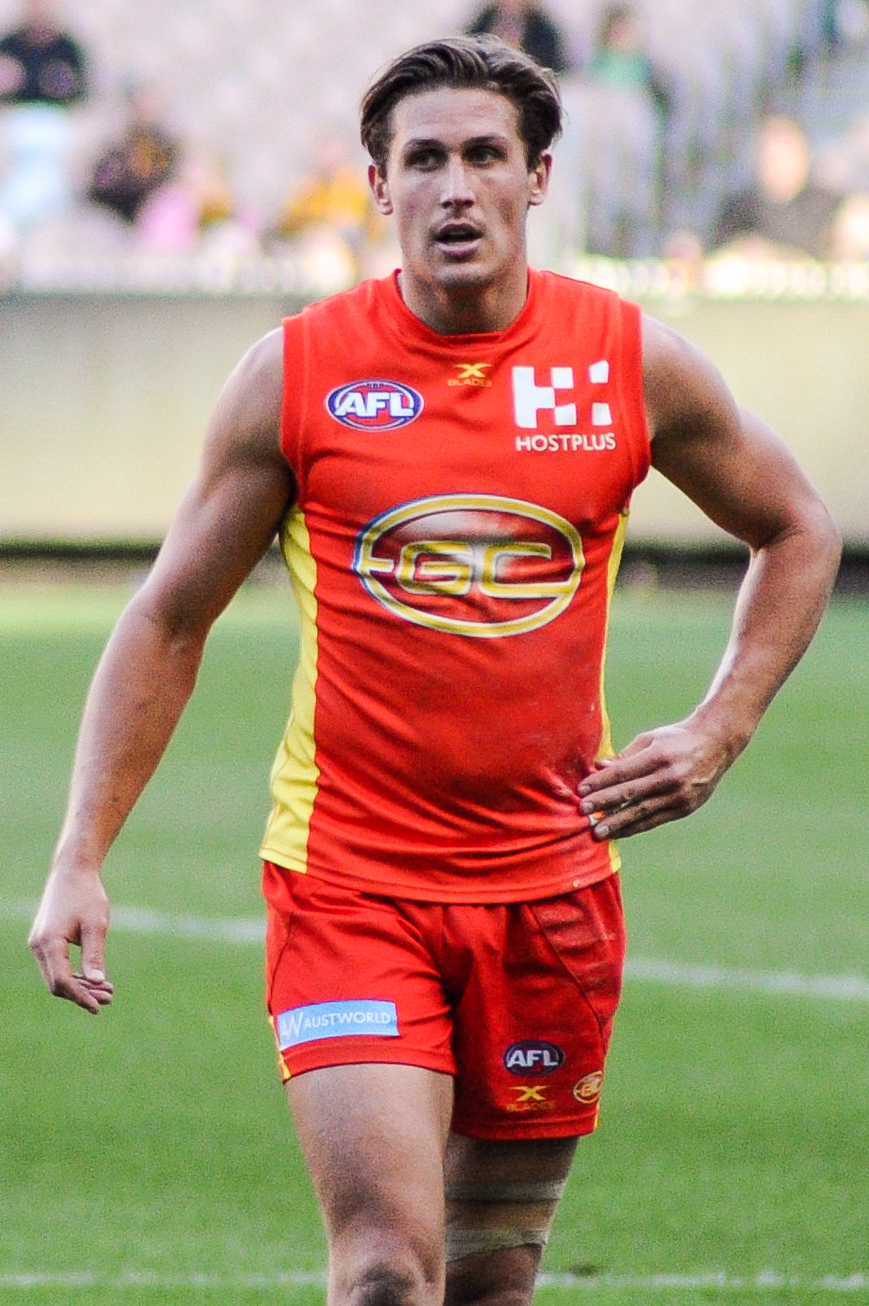
David Swallow, Gold Coast games record holder

Updated to the end of the 2026 season.

**Bold**	Current player

Player	Games	Seasons
David Swallow	249	2011–2025
**Touk Miller**	**237**	**2015–present**

== Greater Western Sydney ==
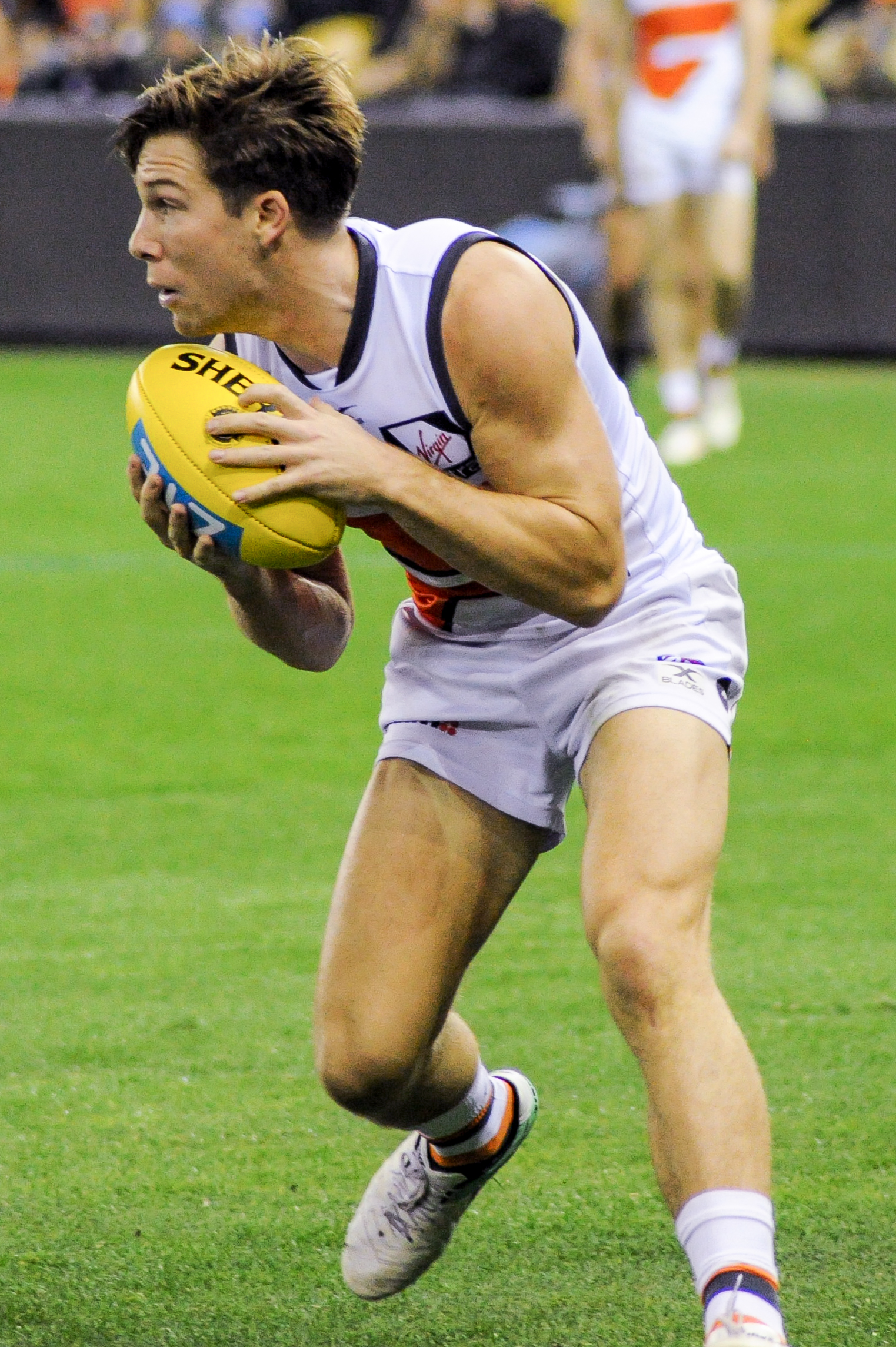
Toby Greene, Greater Western Sydney games record holder

Updated to the end of the 2026 season.

**Bold**	Current player

Player	Games	Seasons
**Toby Greene**	**282**	**2012–present**
**Lachie Whitfield**	**278**	**2013–present**
Callan Ward	267	2012–2025
**Stephen Coniglio**	**248**	**2012–present**
**Josh Kelly**	**230**	**2014–present**
**Harry Himmelberg**	**224**	**2016–present**
Nick Haynes	211	2012–2024

== Hawthorn ==
Updated to the end of the 2026 season.

**Bold**	Current player

Player	Games	Seasons
Michael Tuck	426	1971–1991
Leigh Matthews	332	1969–1985
Luke Breust	308	2011–2025
Sam Mitchell	307	2002–2016
Shane Crawford	305	1993–2008
Luke Hodge	305	2002–2017
Chris Langford	303	1983–1997
Don Scott	302	1967–1981
Kelvin Moore	300	1970–1984
Jarryd Roughead	283	2005–2019
**Jack Gunston**	**271**	**2012–2022, 2024–present**
Gary Ayres	269	1978–1993
Jason Dunstall	269	1985–1998
Peter Knights	264	1969–1985
Jordan Lewis	264	2005–2016
John Platten	258	1986–1997
Liam Shiels	255	2010–2022
Shaun Burgoyne	250	2010–2021
Grant Birchall	248	2006–2019
John Kennedy Jr.	241	1979–1991
Robert DiPierdomenico	240	1975–1991
Graham Arthur	232	1955–1968
Chris Mew	230	1980–1992
Rodney Eade	229	1976–1987
Michael Moncrieff	224	1971–1983
Mark Graham	223	1993–2004
Alan Martello	223	1970–1980
**Blake Hardwick**	**223**	**2016–present**
John Peck	213	1954–1966
Andrew Collins	212	1987–1996
David Parkin	211	1961–1974
Darrin Pritchard	211	1987–1997
Isaac Smith	210	2011–2020
Ben Dixon	203	1997–2007
**James Sicily**	**203**	**2014–present**
Geoff Ablett	202	1973–1982
Ben Stratton	202	2010–2020
Ted Pool	200	1926–1938
Brad Sewell	200	2003–2014

== Melbourne ==
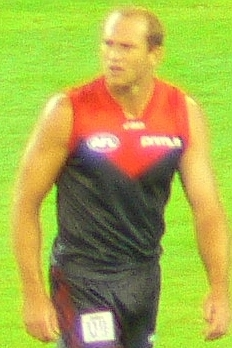
David Neitz, Melbourne games record holder

Updated to the end of the 2026 season.

**Bold**	Current player

Player	Games	Seasons
David Neitz	306	1993–2008
Nathan Jones	302	2006–2021
Robert Flower	272	1973–1987
Adem Yze	271	1995–2008
**Max Gawn**	**271**	**2009–present**
Jim Stynes	264	1987–1998
Tom McDonald	260	2011–2026
Steven Febey	258	1988–2001
Brad Green	254	2000–2012
Brian Dixon	252	1954–1968
James McDonald	251	1997–2010
**Jack Viney**	**238**	**2013–present**
Jeff White	236	1998–2008
Brett Lovett	235	1986–1997
Todd Viney	233	1987–1999
Russell Robertson	228	1997–2009
Stan Alves	226	1965–1976
Garry Lyon	226	1986–1999
Greg Wells	224	1969–1980
Cameron Bruce	224	2000–2010
Gary Hardeman	219	1967–1981
Jack Mueller	216	1934–1950
Percy Beames	213	1931–1944
Christian Petracca	212	2015–2025
Norm Smith	210	1935–1948
**Christian Salem**	**208**	**2014–present**
Don Williams	205	1953–1968
Clayton Oliver	205	2016–2025
Ron Barassi	204	1953–1964
Steven Smith	203	1974–1985
Tassie Johnson	202	1959–1969

== North Melbourne/Kangaroos ==
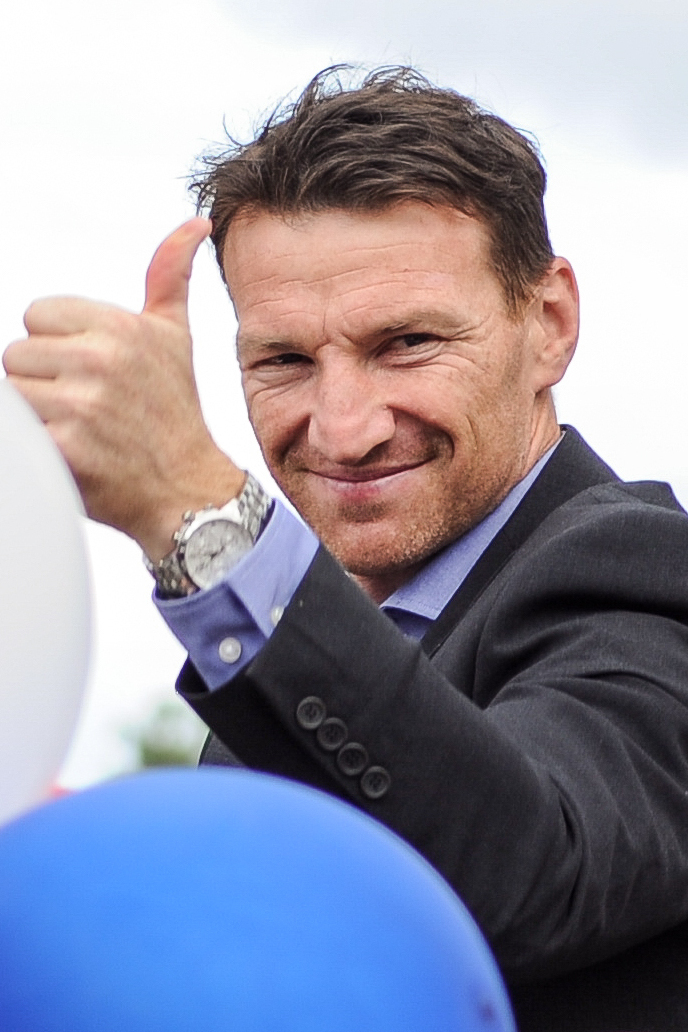
Brent Harvey, North Melbourne/Kangaroos games record holder

Updated to the end of the 2026 season.

**Bold**	Current player

Player	Games	Seasons
Brent Harvey	432	1996–2016
Drew Petrie	316	2001–2016
Todd Goldstein	315	2007–2023
Glenn Archer	311	1992–2007
Wayne Schimmelbusch	306	1973–1987
Adam Simpson	306	1995–2009
Keith Greig	294	1971–1985
Anthony Stevens	292	1989–2005
Mick Martyn	287	1988–2002
Jack Ziebell	280	2009–2023
David Dench	275	1969–1984
Michael Firrito	275	2003–2016
John Dugdale	248	1955–1970
Brady Rawlings	245	1999–2011
Wayne Carey	244	1989–2001
Shannon Grant	243	1998–2008
Daniel Wells	243	2003–2016
David King	241	1994–2004
Scott Thompson	241	2008–2019
Ben Cunnington	238	2010–2023
**Luke McDonald**	**236**	**2014–present**
Craig Sholl	235	1987–2000
Shaun Atley	234	2011–2021
Stephen McCann	226	1977–1988
Ross Smith	224	1984–1996
John Blakey	224	1993–2002
Andrew Swallow	224	2006–2017
Anthony Rock	222	1988–2001
Allen Aylett	220	1952–1964
John Law	219	1978–1989
Brett Allison	219	1987–1999
Ian Fairley	217	1983–1996
Lindsay Thomas	205	2007–2017
Laurie Dwyer	201	1956–1970
John Longmire	200	1988–1999

== Port Adelaide ==
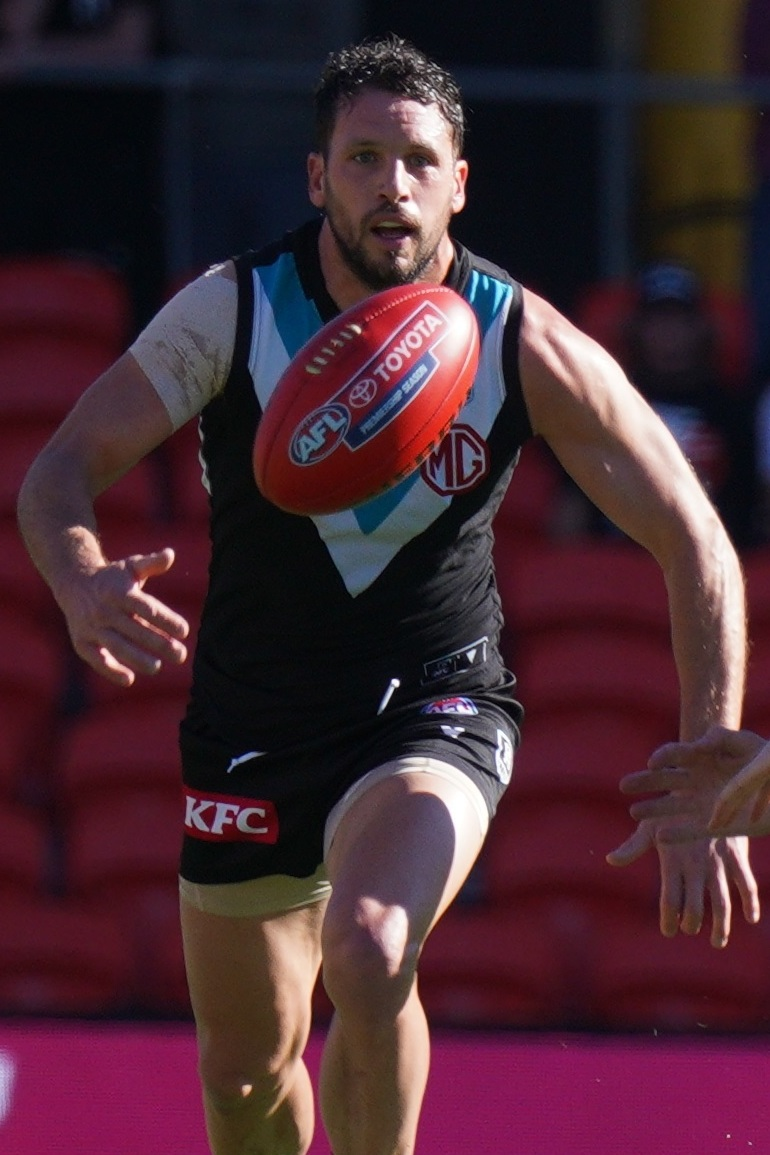
Travis Boak, Port Adelaide games record holder

Updated to the end of the 2026 season.

**Bold**	Current player

Player	Games	Seasons
Travis Boak	387	2007–2025
Kane Cornes	300	2001–2015
**Ollie Wines**	**292**	**2013–present**
Justin Westhoff	280	2007–2020
Robbie Gray	271	2007–2022
Warren Tredrea	255	1997–2010
**Darcy Byrne-Jones**	**243**	**2014–present**
Peter Burgoyne	240	1997–2009
Chad Cornes	239	1999–2011
Brendon Lade	234	1997–2009
Domenic Cassisi	228	2002–2014
Tom Jonas	216	2011–2023

== Richmond ==
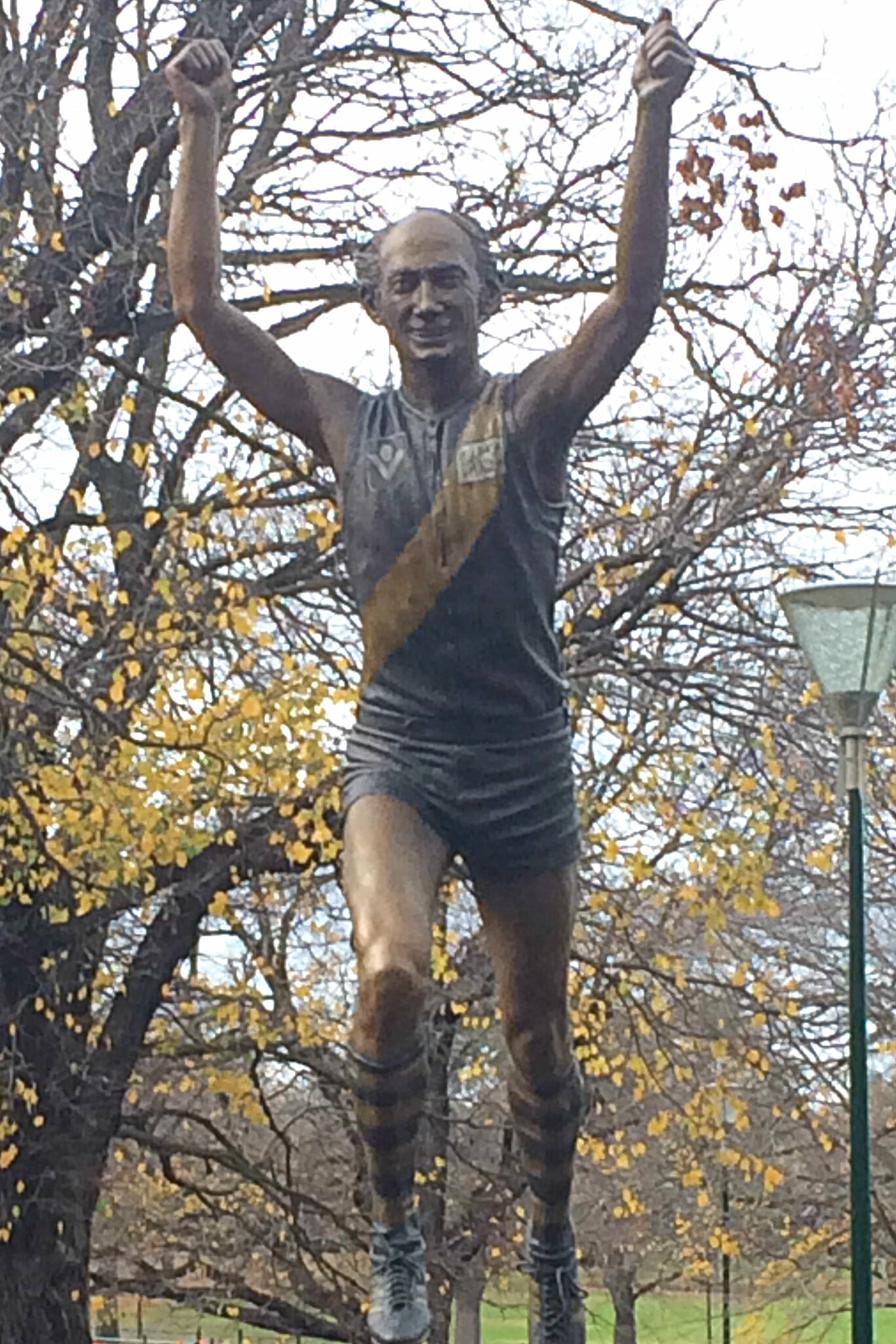
Kevin Bartlett, Richmond games record holder

Updated to the end of the 2026 season.

**Bold**	Current player

Player	Games	Seasons
Kevin Bartlett	403	1965–1983
Jack Riewoldt	347	2007–2023
Jack Dyer	311	1931–1949
Trent Cotchin	306	2008–2023
Shane Edwards	303	2007–2022
Dustin Martin	302	2010–2024
Francis Bourke	300	1967–1981
Wayne Campbell	297	1991–2005
Jack Titus	294	1926–1943
Matthew Richardson	282	1993–2009
Matthew Knights	279	1988–2002
**Nick Vlastuin**	**277**	**2013–present**
Dale Weightman	274	1978–1993
Chris Newman	268	2002–2015
Joel Bowden	265	1996–2009
Percy Bentley	263	1925–1940
Vic Thorp	262	1910–1925
Kevin Sheedy	251	1967–1979
Roger Dean	245	1957–1973
Brendon Gale	244	1990–2001
Brett Deledio	243	2005–2016
Mervyn Keane	238	1972–1984
Dylan Grimes	234	2010–2024
Mark Lee	233	1977–1991
Jim Jess	223	1976–1988
David Cloke	219	1974–1982, 1990–1991
Dick Clay	213	1966–1976
Kamdyn McIntosh	213	2015–2025
**Jayden Short**	**211**	**2015–present**
Kevin O'Neill	209	1930–1941
Bryan Wood	209	1972–1982
Darren Gaspar	207	1996–2007
Bachar Houli	206	2011–2021
Basil McCormack	200	1925–1936
Michael Roach	200	1977–1989
Alex Rance	200	2009–2019

== South Melbourne/Sydney ==
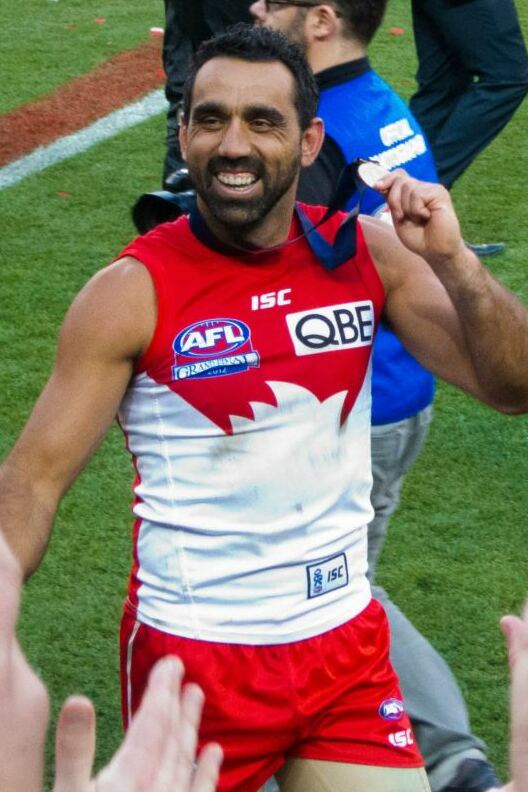
Adam Goodes, South Melbourne/Sydney games record holder

Updated to the end of the 2026 season.

**Bold**	Current player

Player	Games	Seasons
Adam Goodes	372	1999–2015
Jude Bolton	325	1999–2013
Jarrad McVeigh	325	2004–2019
Michael O'Loughlin	303	1995–2009
**Jake Lloyd**	**296**	**2013–present**
Luke Parker	293	2011–2024
**Dane Rampe**	**289**	**2013–present**
Ryan O'Keefe	286	2000–2014
Josh Kennedy	276	2010–2022
John Rantall	260	1963–1972, 1976–1979
Heath Grundy	256	2006–2019
Kieren Jack	256	2007–2019
Mark Browning	251	1975–1987
Mark Bayes	246	1985–1998
Stephen Wright	246	1979–1992
Daryn Cresswell	244	1992–2003
**Isaac Heeney**	**244**	**2015–present**
Brett Kirk	241	1999–2010
Bob Skilton	237	1956–1971
Leo Barry	237	1995–2009
Paul Kelly	234	1990–2002
**Harry Cunningham**	**233**	**2012–present**
Ron Clegg	231	1945–1960
Tony Morwood	229	1978–1989
Ted Richards	228	2006–2016
Jack Graham	227	1935–1949
Vic Belcher	226	1907–1920
Jared Crouch	223	1996–2009
Jim Cleary	222	1934–1948
Dennis Carroll	219	1981–1993
Rod Carter	217	1980–1990
Andrew Dunkley	217	1992–2002
**Tom Papley**	**216**	**2016–present**
David McLeish	213	1969–1980
Nick Smith	211	2008–2019
Dan Hannebery	208	2009–2018
Mark Tandy	207	1911–1926
Stuart Maxfield	200	1996–2005

== St Kilda ==
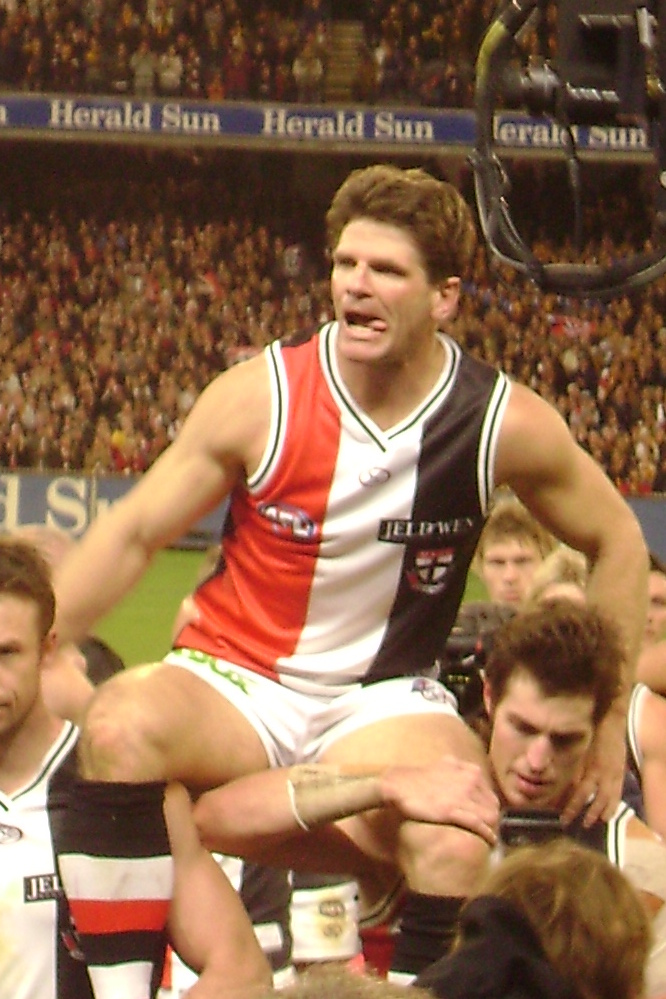
Robert Harvey, St Kilda games record holder

Updated to the end of the 2026 season.

**Bold**	Current player

Player	Games	Seasons
Robert Harvey	383	1988–2008
Nick Riewoldt	336	2001–2017
Nathan Burke	323	1987–2003
Stewart Loewe	321	1986–2002
Barry Breen	300	1965–1982
Lenny Hayes	297	1999–2014
Leigh Montagna	287	2002–2017
Stephen Milne	275	2001–2013
Gary Colling	265	1968–1981
Nick Dal Santo	260	2002–2013
Kevin Neale	256	1965–1977
Justin Peckett	252	1992–2006
Danny Frawley	240	1984–1995
Ross Smith	234	1961–1975
Max Hudghton	234	1997–2009
Trevor Barker	230	1975–1989
Nicky Winmar	230	1987–1998
Sam Fisher	228	2004–2016
Jeff Sarau	226	1973–1983
Austinn Jones	226	1995–2005
**Jack Sinclair**	**225**	**2015–present**
Geoff Cunningham	224	1977–1989
Andrew Thompson	221	1997–2007
Jason Blake	219	2000–2013
Harry Lever	218	1905–1922
Sebastian Ross	211	2012–2024
Brian Mynott	210	1964–1975
Sam Gilbert	208	2006–2018
Jarryn Geary	207	2008–2022
Brendon Goddard	205	2003–2012
Carl Ditterich	203	1963–1978
Steven Baker	203	1999–2011
Justin Koschitzke	200	2001–2013

== West Coast ==
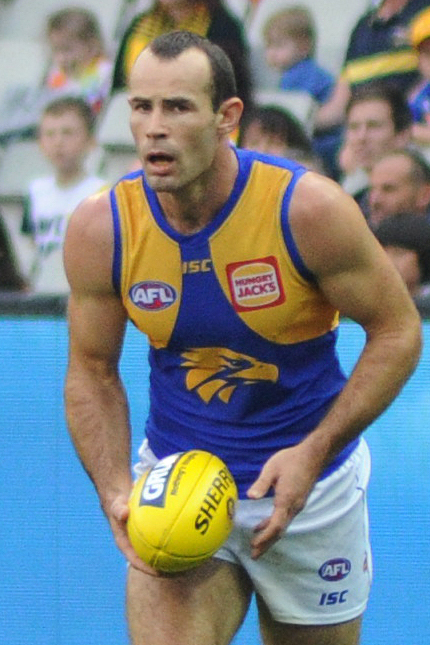
Shannon Hurn, West Coast games record holder

Updated to the end of the 2026 season.

**Bold**	Current player

Player	Games	Seasons
Shannon Hurn	333	2006–2023
Jack Darling	298	2011–2024
Dean Cox	290	2001–2014
Andrew Gaff	280	2011–2024
Glen Jakovich	276	1991–2004
Josh Kennedy	271	2006–2022
Darren Glass	270	2000-2014
Guy McKenna	267	1988–2000
Drew Banfield	265	1993–2006
Jamie Cripps	261	2013–2026
Peter Matera	253	1990–2002
Andrew Embley	250	1999–2013
Luke Shuey	248	2009–2023
Dean Kemp	243	1990–2001
Ashley McIntosh	242	1991–2003
Matt Priddis	240	2006–2017
Ben Cousins	238	1996–2007
Michael Braun	228	1997–2008
David Wirrpanda	227	1996–2009
**Liam Duggan**	**222**	**2015–present**
Daniel Kerr	220	2001–2013
Mark LeCras	219	2005–2018
Brad Sheppard	216	2010–2021
Chris Lewis	215	1987–2000
Chris Masten	215	2008–2019
Nic Naitanui	213	2009–2023
John Worsfold	209	1987–1998
Quinten Lynch	209	2002–2012
**Elliot Yeo**	**206**	**2014–present**
Chris Mainwaring	201	1987–1999

== See also ==
- VFL/AFL games records
- List of AFL Women's players to have played 50 games for one club
