= 1954 VFL grand final =

Grand final of the 1954 Victorian Football League season

1954 VFL Grand Final

Footscray	Melbourne
15.12 (102)	7.9 (51)
	1	2	3	4
FOO	6.3 (39)	8.5 (53)	12.9 (81)	15.12 (102)
MEL	1.4 (10)	4.6 (30)	6.7 (43)	7.9 (51)
- Date: 25 September 1954
- Stadium: Melbourne Cricket Ground
- Attendance: 80,897

The 1954 VFL Grand Final was an Australian rules football game contested between the Footscray Football Club and Melbourne Football Club, held at the Melbourne Cricket Ground on 25 September 1954. It was the 57th annual Grand Final of the Victorian Football League (VFL), staged to determine the premiers for the 1954 VFL season.

== The match ==
The match, attended by 80,897 spectators, was won by Footscray by 51 points, marking that club's first VFL premiership.

Footscray had won nine premierships in the Victorian Football Association (VFA) before entering the VFL in 1925.

Footscray led by 29 points at quarter-time and were comfortably in front for the rest of the game. Jack Collins kicked 7 goals for the match and John Kerr had 32 disposals.

== The teams ==
Footscray	Melbourne

Footscray
B:	Wally Donald (vc)	Herb Henderson	Dave Bryden
HB:	Alan Martin	Ted Whitten	Jim Gallagher
C:	Ron McCarthy	Don Ross	Doug Reynolds
HF:	Roger Duffy	Peter Box	Ron Stockman
F:	Brian Gilmore	Jack Collins	Charlie Sutton (c)
Foll:	Harvey Stevens	Arthur Edwards	John Kerr
Res:	Jack Nuttall	Angus Abbey	
Coach:	Charlie Sutton		

Melbourne
B:	John Beckwith	Lance Arnold	Ken Christie
HB:	Geoff Collins (c)	Noel McMahen	Don Williams
C:	Ralph Lane	Ken Melville	Ian McLean
HF:	Laurie Mithen	Geoff McGivern	Geoff Case
F:	Bob Johnson	Noel Clarke	Ken Albiston
Foll:	Denis Cordner	Ron Barassi	Stuart Spencer
Res:	Frank Adams	Brian Dixon	
Coach:	Norm Smith		

Umpire – Jack McMurray Jr.

== Statistics ==
=== Score ===
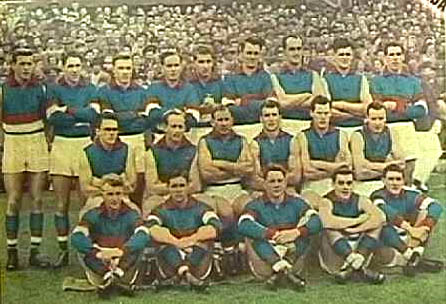
Footscray team, premiers

Team	1	2	3	4	Total
Footscray	6.3	8.5	12.9	15.12	15.12 (102)
Melbourne	1.4	4.6	6.7	7.9	7.9 (51)

=== Goalkickers ===
Footscray

- Collins 7
- Sutton 3
- Duffy 1
- Kerr 1
- Reynolds 1
- Stevens 1
- Stockman 1

Melbourne

- Albiston 1
- Barassi 1
- Clarke 1
- Johnson 1
- McLean 1
- Mithen 1
- Spencer 1

== See also ==
- 1954 VFL season
- 2021 AFL Grand Final
