= Ross Abbey =

Australian rules footballer, born 1953

Personal information
- Full name: Ross Maxwell Abbey
- Born: 21 January 1953 (age 73); Melbourne
- Original team: Wesley College, Melbourne

Playing career^{1}
Years	Club	Games (Goals)
1971–1981	Footscray	123 (65)
- ^{1} Playing statistics correct to the end of 1981.

Career highlights
- Victorian state team; VFL finals series of 1974 and 1976

Ross Abbey (born 21 January 1953) is a former Australian rules footballer, who played with Footscray, now known as the Western Bulldogs, in the Victorian Football League (VFL).

The son of Angus Abbey, a member of Footscray's 1954 premiership team, Abbey initially played for Wesley College, Melbourne and Strathmore, an area traditionally zoned to Essendon, but was recruited to Footscray under the father/son rule.

Abbey played in a variety of positions, but mostly on the half back flank and as a ruck rover. His playing measurements were 180 cm and 82.5 kg, which coincidentally were the precise measurements of his father. Abbey's playing highlight was being part of the Footscray finals team of 1974 and 1976 (although Footscray lost the elimination final on both occasions after having finished 5th in each of those seasons). He retired from VFL football in 1981, having played 123 games and represented Victoria at interstate level.
