= Alan Martin (Australian rules footballer) =

Australian rules footballer

Personal information
- Full name: Alan John Martin
- Born: 13 March 1928
- Died: 30 August 2004 (aged 76)
- Original team: Golden Point
- Height: 180 cm (5 ft 11 in)
- Weight: 76 kg (168 lb)

Playing career^{1}
| Years | Club | Games (Goals) |
| 1949–1954 | Footscray | 105 (8) |
- ^{1} Playing statistics correct to the end of 1954.

Career highlights
- VFL premiership player: 1954

Alan John Martin (13 March 1928 – 30 August 2004) was an Australian rules footballer who played with Footscray in the Victorian Football League (VFL) during the early 1950s. His last game for Footscray was in their victorious 1954 Grand Final. He then went to Golden Square, as coach.
