= Angus Abbey =

Australian rules footballer (1925–2025)

Personal information
- Full name: Angus Maxwell Abbey
- Born: 15 November 1925
- Died: 22 September 2025 (aged 99)
- Original team: Waratah (FDFL)

Playing career
Years	Club	Games (Goals)
1949–1954	Footscray	78 (0)

Career highlights
- VFL premiership player: 1954; Best clubman award, 1954

Angus Maxwell Abbey (15 November 1925 – 22 September 2025) was an Australian rules football player who played with Footscray in the Victorian Football League (VFL). Abbey played mainly as a defender, and was the unused twentieth man in Footscray's 1954 premiership team. He played his only junior football year with Waratah in the Footscray District League. His playing measurements were 180 cm and 82.5 kg, which are identical to those of his son Ross who also played for Footscray from 1971 to 1981. He retired from VFL football in 1954, having played 78 games.

Abbey died on 22 September 2025, at the age of 99.

== Sources ==
- Holmesby, Russell & Main, Jim (2002) The Encyclopedia of AFL Footballers, Crown Content, Melbourne.
