= Ron Stockman =

Australian rules footballer

Personal information
- Full name: Ronald Vincent Stockman
- Born: 19 August 1934
- Died: 29 December 2023 (aged 89)
- Original team: West Footscray (FDFL)
- Height: 183 cm (6 ft 0 in)
- Weight: 81 kg (179 lb)

Playing career^{1}
Years	Club	Games (Goals)
1953–1958	Footscray	73 (1)
1958–1961	South Melbourne	23 (0)
Total		96 (1)
- ^{1} Playing statistics correct to the end of 1961.

Career highlights
- VFL premiership player: 1954

Ronald Vincent Stockman (19 August 1934 – 29 December 2023) was an Australian rules footballer who played with Footscray and South Melbourne in the Victorian Football League (VFL) during the 1950s.

Stockman was a member of the Bulldogs' 1954 premiership side, his goal in the third quarter was the only goal he kicked in his 96-game VFL career.
