= John Kerr (Australian footballer) =

Australian rules footballer

Personal information
- Born: 15 July 1934
- Died: 16 September 2005 (aged 71)
- Original team: Melbourne Grammar
- Height: 177 cm (5 ft 10 in)
- Weight: 78 kg (172 lb)

Playing career^{1}
Years	Club	Games (Goals)
1953–1958	Footscray	81 (24)
1958	Melbourne	2 (2)
Total		83 (26)
- ^{1} Playing statistics correct to the end of 1958.

Career highlights
- VFL premiership player: 1954

John Kerr (15 July 1934 – 16 September 2005) was an Australian rules footballer who played with Footscray in the Victorian Football League (VFL) during the 1950s.

Kerr played as a rover spent six seasons with the Bulldogs. He was one of the best afield in their 1954 Grand Final victory, his 32 possessions was the most by a Footscray player.
