= Dave Bryden =

Australian rules footballer

Personal information
- Full name: David Greenhill Bryden
- Nickname: Miner
- Born: 23 June 1927; Wonthaggi
- Died: 30 August 2013 (aged 86); Broadmeadows
- Original team: Wonthaggi
- Height: 187 cm (6 ft 2 in)
- Weight: 86 kg (190 lb)
- Position: Ruckman

Playing career^{1}
Years	Club	Games (Goals)
1947–1955	Footscray	147 (56)

Representative team honours^{2}
Years	Team	Games (Goals)
1951	Victoria	3 (?)
- ^{1} Playing statistics correct to the end of 1955.^{2} Representative statistics correct as of 1951.

Career highlights
- VFL premiership player: 1954

David Greenhill Bryden (23 June 1927 – 30 August 2013) was an Australian rules footballer in the Victorian Football League (VFL).

Bryden was an old school ruckman-cum-back pocket recruited from Wonthaggi, Victoria who, at his prime was considered one of the best ruckmen in the Victorian Football League. Bryden played for the Victorian interstate team in 1951 and was second best on ground in the 1954 VFL Grand Final. He played for the Bulldogs between 1947 and 1955, kicking 56 goals in 147 games.

After leaving Footscray he coached and played for Nhill in country Victoria for three years. He coached to finals in 2 of the 3 years.

He then returned to Melbourne and played for Kensington in the Sunday league at the age of 31 for 3 seasons. He won the best and fairest in each of the 3 years at that club.
