= List of AFL Women's players to have played 50 games for one club =

This is a list of players who have played at least 50 games for one club in the AFL Women's (AFLW). This list only include home-and-away matches and finals; practice matches are excluded from the totals.

== Adelaide ==
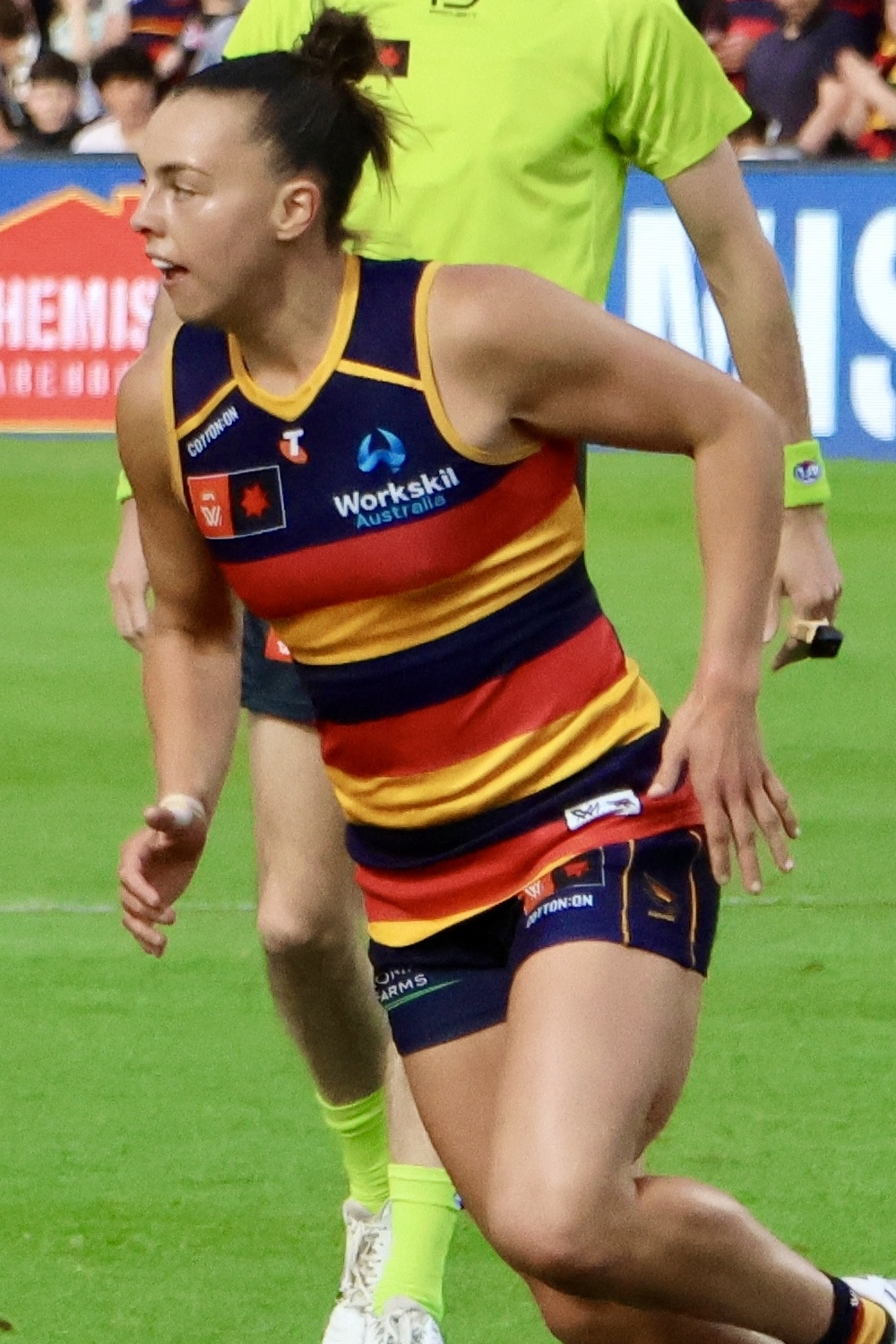
Ebony Marinoff, Adelaide games record holder

Updated to the end of the 2025 season.

**Bold**	Current player

Player	Games	Seasons
**Ebony Marinoff**	**107**	**2017–present**
Anne Hatchard	102	2017–2025
Stevie-Lee Thompson	97	2017–2025
**Sarah Allan**	**95**	**2017–present**
**Danielle Ponter**	**86**	**2019–present**
**Eloise Jones**	**83**	**2018–present**
**Chelsea Randall**	**80**	**2017–present**
**Chelsea Biddell**	**76**	**2020–present**
**Teah Charlton**	**71**	**2021–present**
**Caitlin Gould**	**70**	**2020–present**
**Maddi Newman**	**67**	**2020–present**
**Rachelle Martin**	**61**	**2020–present**
Marijana Randall	50	2018–2022 (S7)

== Brisbane ==
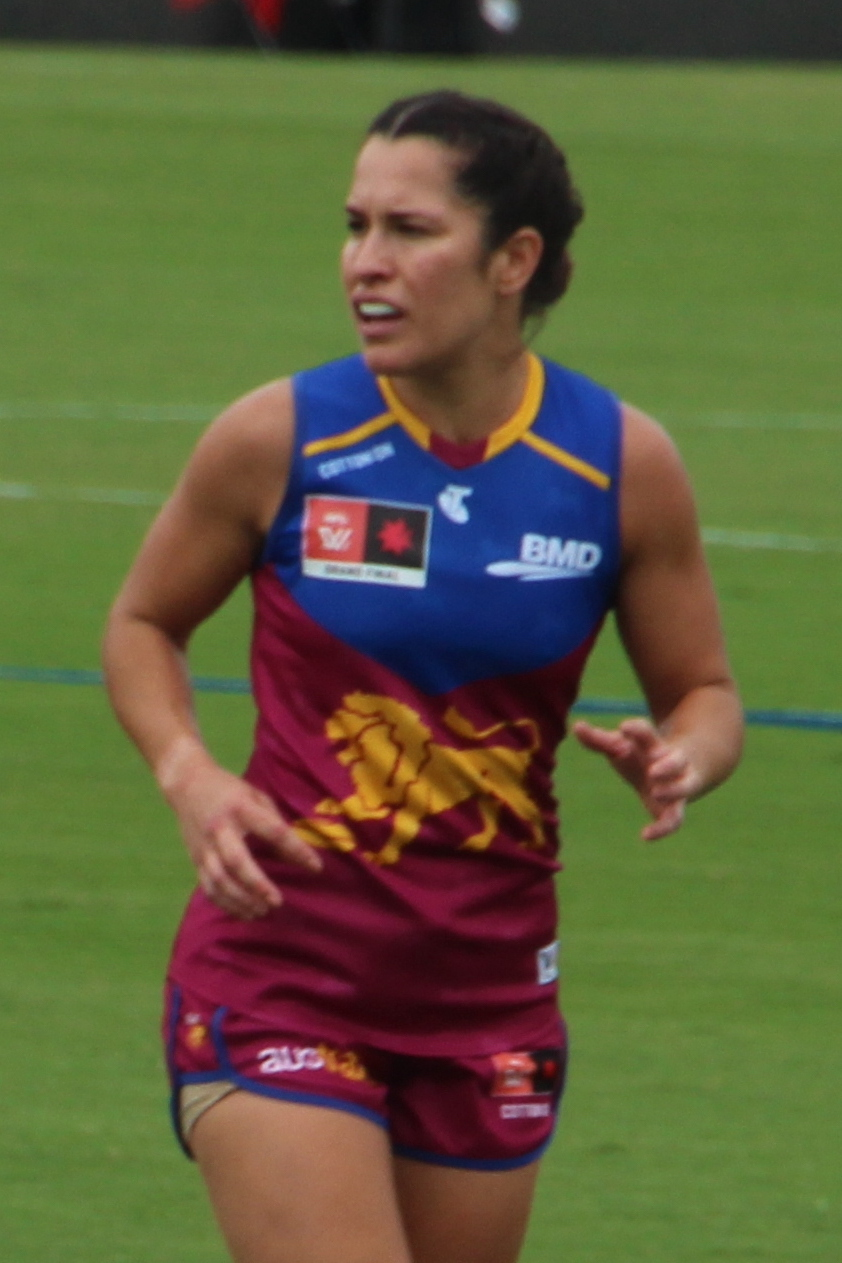
Ally Anderson, Brisbane games record holder

Updated to the end of the 2025 season.

^{§}	AFL Women's games record holder
**Bold**	Current player

Player	Games	Seasons
**Ally Anderson**^{§}	**108**^{§}	**2017–present**^{§}
**Shannon Campbell**	**103**	**2017–present**
**Breanna Koenen**	**103**	**2017–present**
**Sophie Conway**	**89**	**2018–present**
**Nat Grider**	**85**	**2019–present**
**Belle Dawes**	**85**	**2020–present**
**Cathy Svarc**	**84**	**2020–present**
**Orla O'Dwyer**	**82**	**2020–present**
**Jade Ellenger**	**79**	**2019–present**
**Tahlia Hickie**	**79**	**2020–present**
**Dakota Davidson**	**78**	**2020–present**
**Courtney Hodder**	**77**	**2021–present**
Taylor Smith	76	2021–2025
Emily Bates	66	2017–2022 (S7)
**Ruby Svarc**	**57**	**2021–present**
**Lily Postlethwaite**	**54**	**2020–present**
Kate Lutkins	52	2017–2024

== Carlton ==
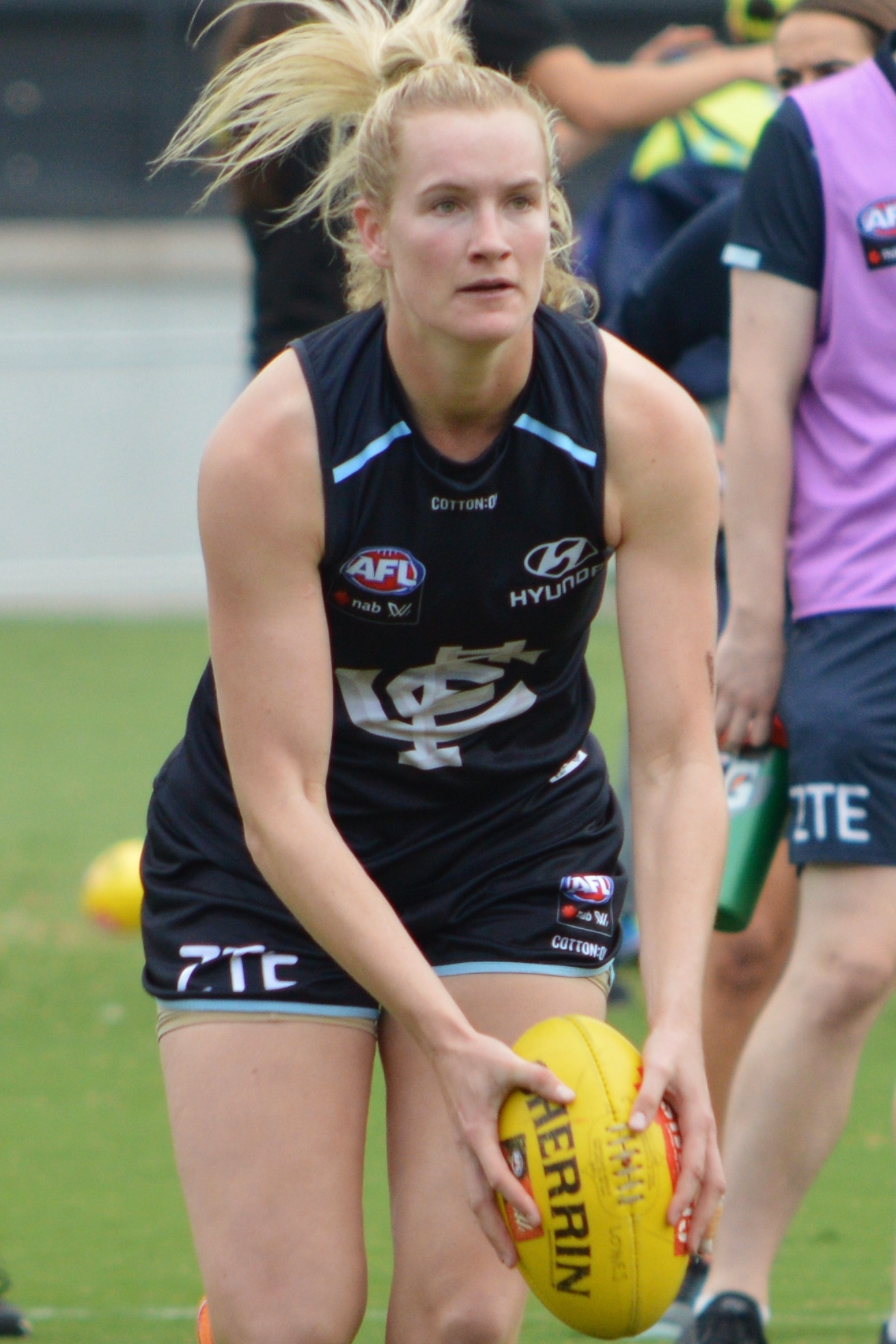
Breann Harrington, Carlton games record holder

Updated to the end of the 2025 season.

**Bold**	Current player

Player	Games	Seasons
**Breann Harrington**	**93**	**2017–present**
**Darcy Vescio**	**92**	**2017–present**
**Gab Pound**	**81**	**2017–present**
Kerryn Peterson	64	2018–2025
**Abbie McKay**	**63**	**2019–present**
**Mimi Hill**	**54**	**2021–present**
**Keeley Sherar**	**52**	**2022 (S6)–present**
**Jess Good**	**51**	**2022 (S6)–present**

== Collingwood ==
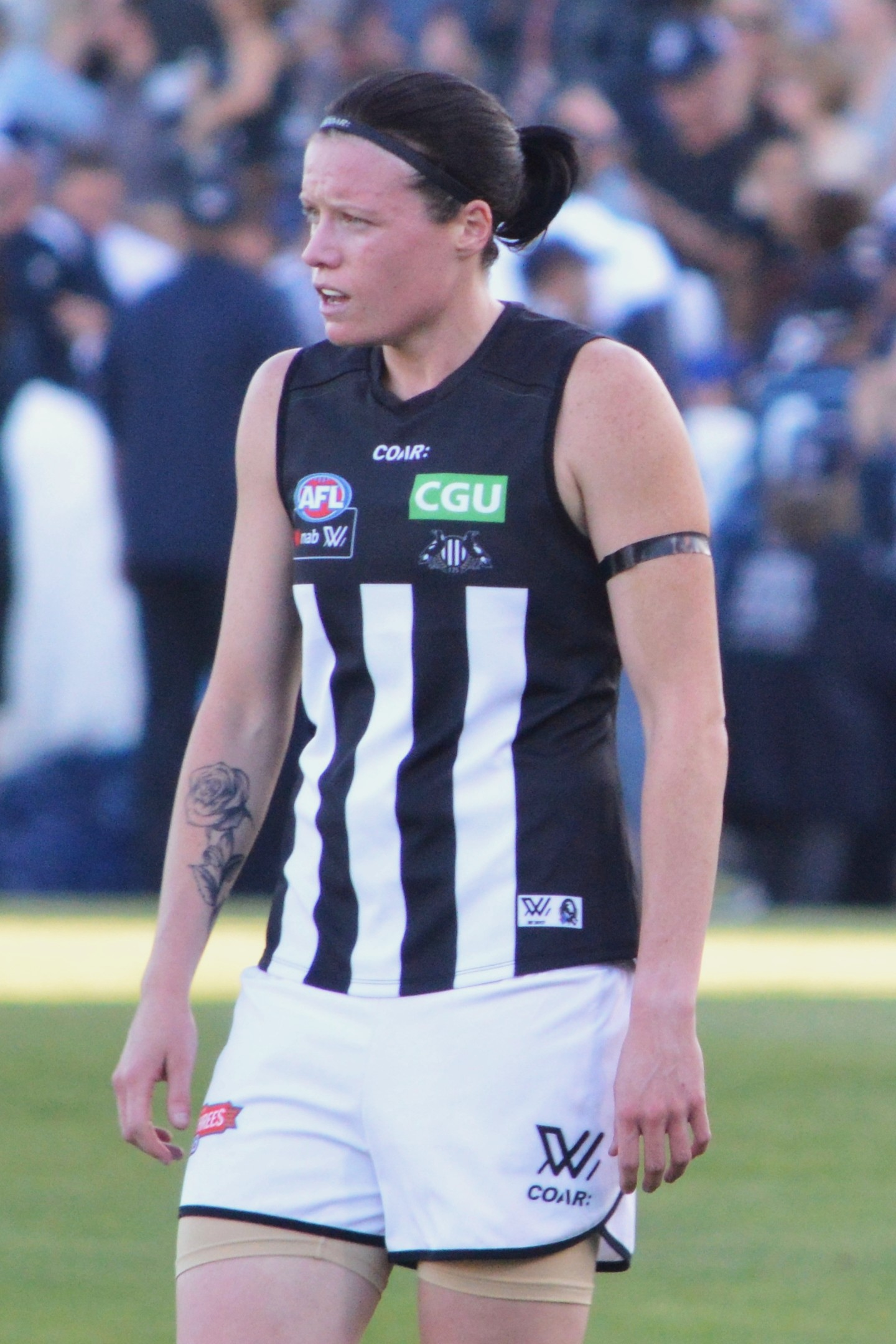
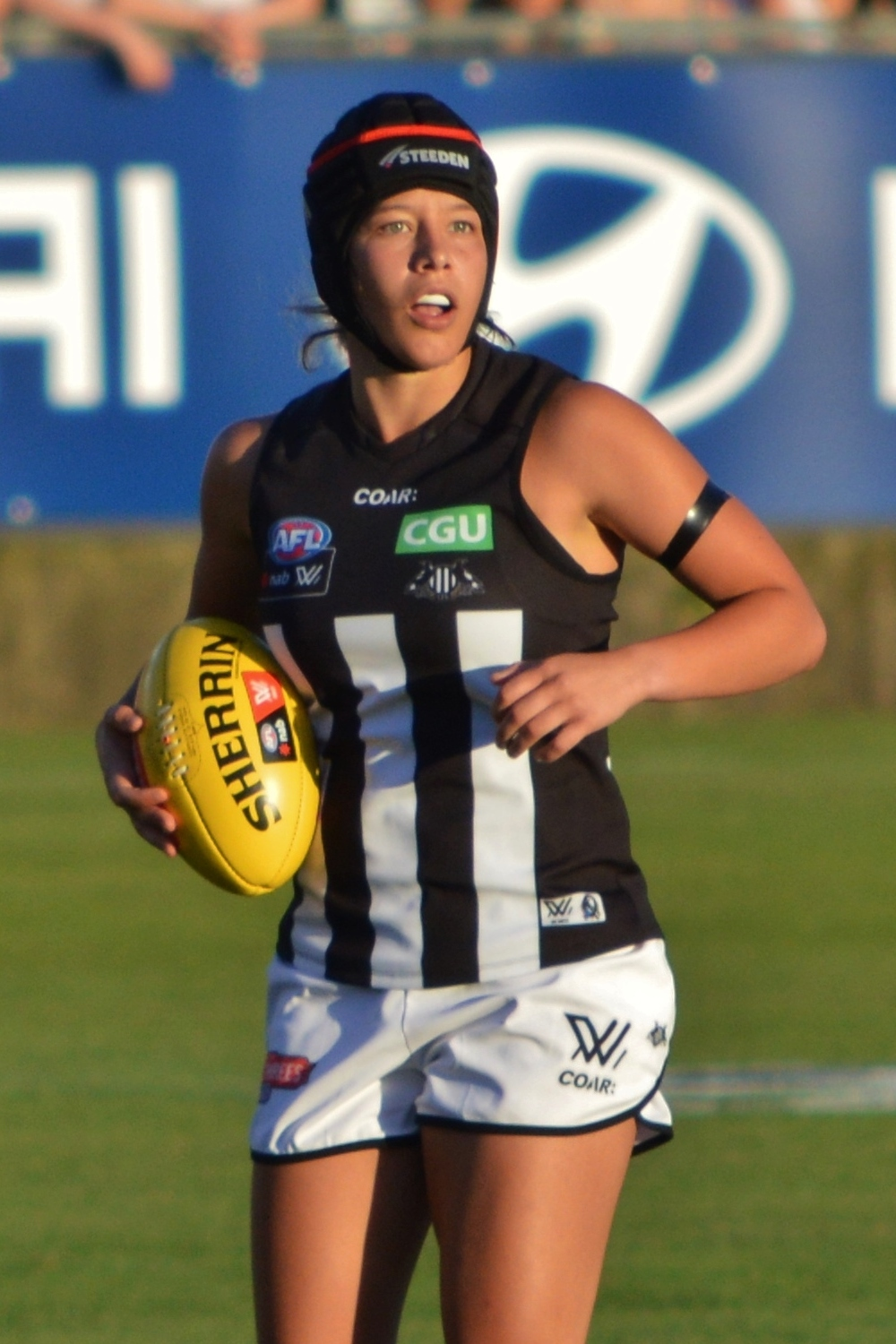
Stacey Livingstone and Brittany Bonnici, Collingwood games record holders

Updated to the end of the 2025 season.

**Bold**	Current player

Player	Games	Seasons
Stacey Livingstone	77	2017–2024
**Brittany Bonnici**	**77**	**2017–present**
Mikala Cann	76	2019–2025
**Sarah Rowe**	**75**	**2019–present**
**Ruby Schleicher**	**74**	**2017–present**
**Jordyn Allen**	**71**	**2019–present**
Sophie Casey	63	2017–2023
**Alana Porter**	**62**	**2020–present**
**Lauren Butler**	**61**	**2019–present**
Steph Chiocci	55	2017–2022 (S7)
Jaimee Lambert	55	2018–2022 (S7)
**Sabrina Frederick**	**54**	**2022 (S6)–present**

== Fremantle ==
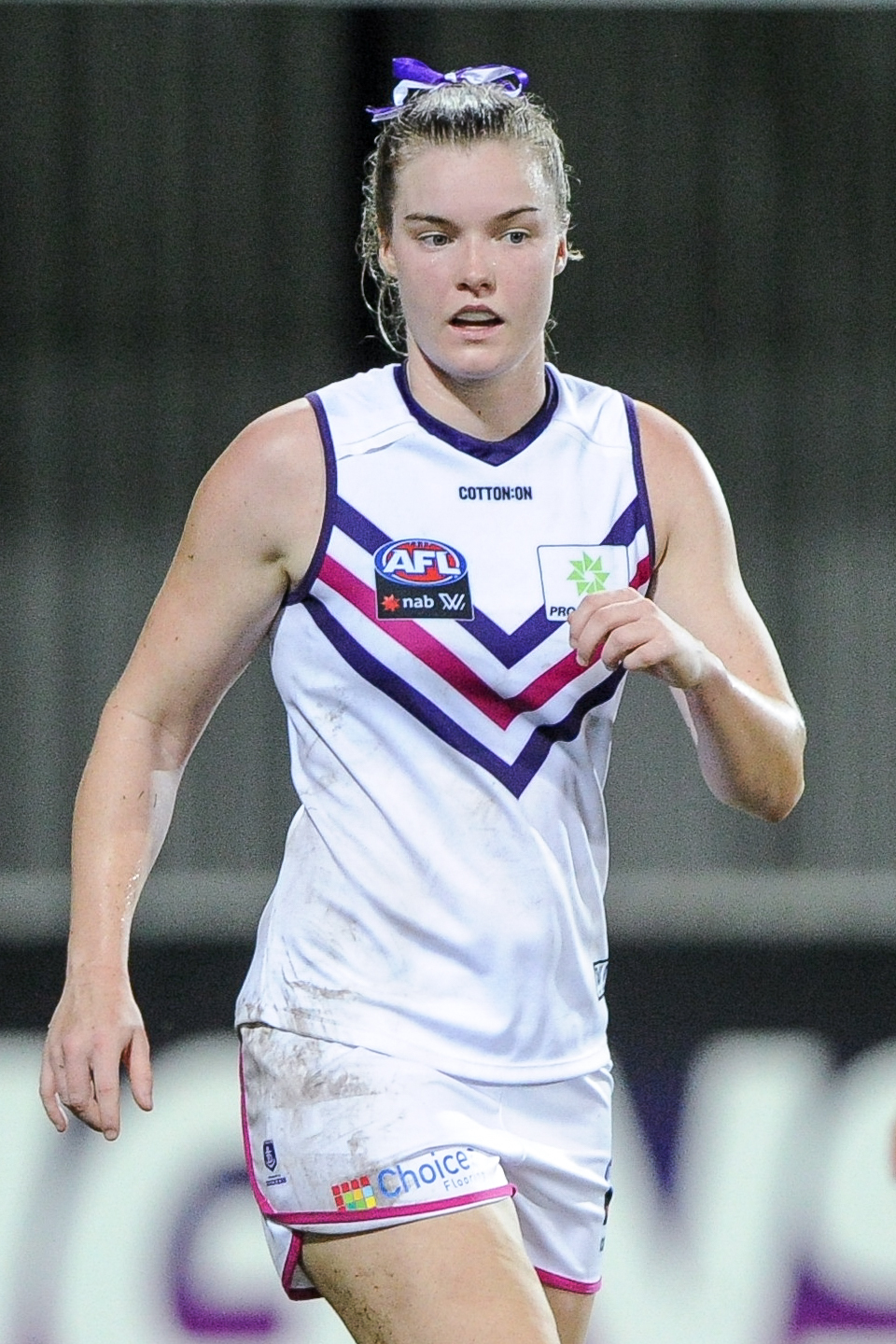
Hayley Miller, Fremantle games record holder

Updated to the end of the 2025 season.

**Bold**	Current player

Player	Games	Seasons
**Hayley Miller**	**92**	**2017–present**
**Gabby O'Sullivan**	**85**	**2017–present**
**Laura Pugh**	**77**	**2019–present**
**Mim Strom**	**74**	**2020–present**
Ebony Antonio	70	2017–2025
**Ange Stannett**	**69**	**2019–present**
**Emma O'Driscoll**	**69**	**2020–present**
**Sarah Verrier**	**62**	**2021–present**
**Kiara Bowers**	**61**	**2017–present**
Philipa Seth	58	2019–2025
**Jessica Low**	**54**	**2022 (S6)–present**

== Geelong ==
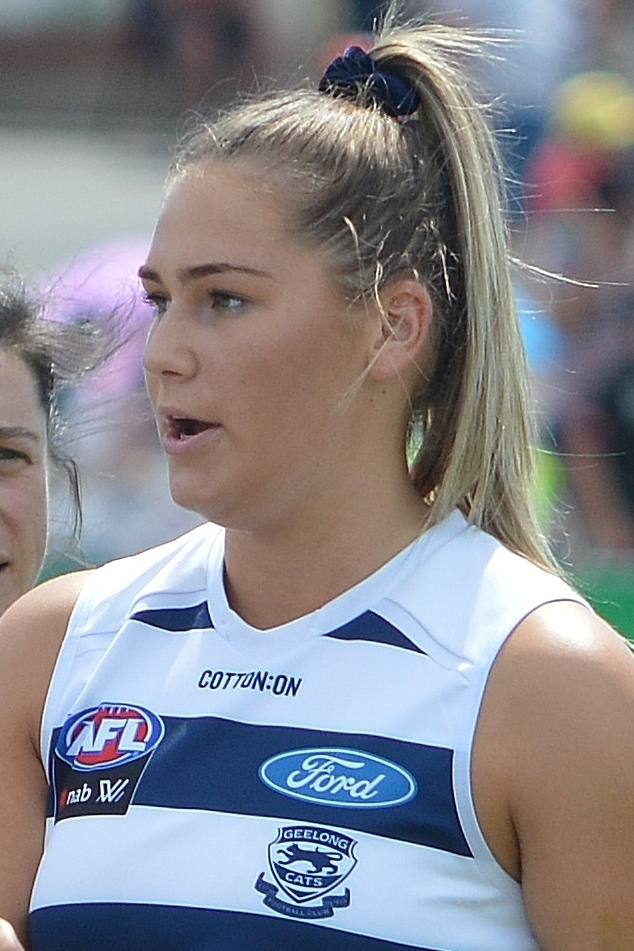
Rebecca Webster, Geelong games record holder

Updated to the end of the 2025 season.

**Bold**	Current player

Player	Games	Seasons
**Rebecca Webster**	**73**	**2019–present**
Meg McDonald	72	2019–2025
**Julia Crockett-Grills**	**72**	**2019–present**
**Amy McDonald**	**68**	**2020–present**
**Georgie Rankin**	**66**	**2019–present**
**Nina Morrison**	**62**	**2019–present**
Kate Darby	57	2019–2025
**Georgie Prespakis**	**53**	**2022 (S6)–present**
**Zali Friswell**	**52**	**2022 (S6)–present**
**Claudia Gunjaca**	**50**	**2022 (S6)–present**

== Gold Coast ==
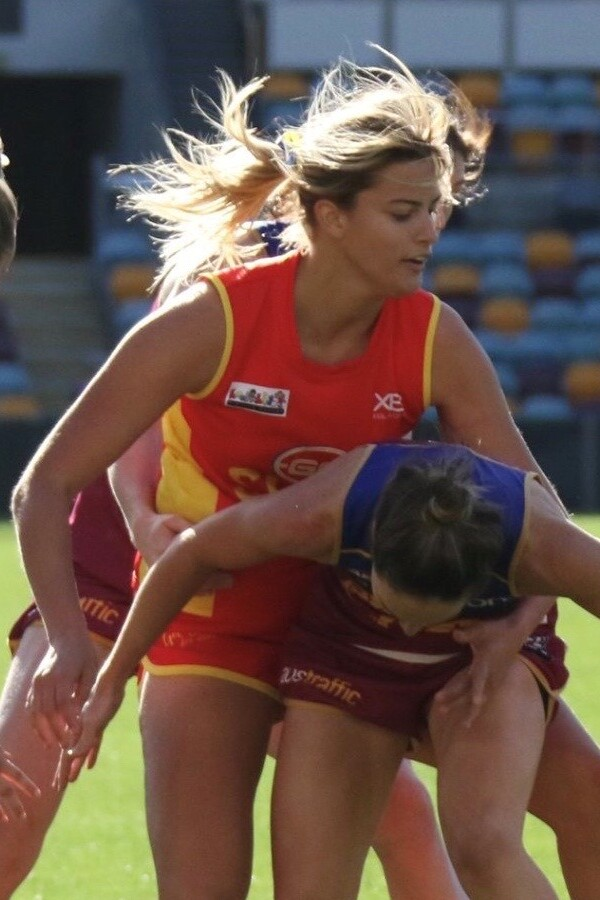
Lauren Bella, Gold Coast games record holder

Updated to the end of the 2025 season.

**Bold**	Current player

Player	Games	Seasons
Lauren Bella	66	2020–2025
**Jamie Stanton**	**55**	**2020–present**
**Lucy Single**	**51**	**2021–present**
**Charlie Rowbottom**	**51**	**2022 (S6)–present**
**Daisy D'Arcy**	**50**	**2021–present**

== Greater Western Sydney ==
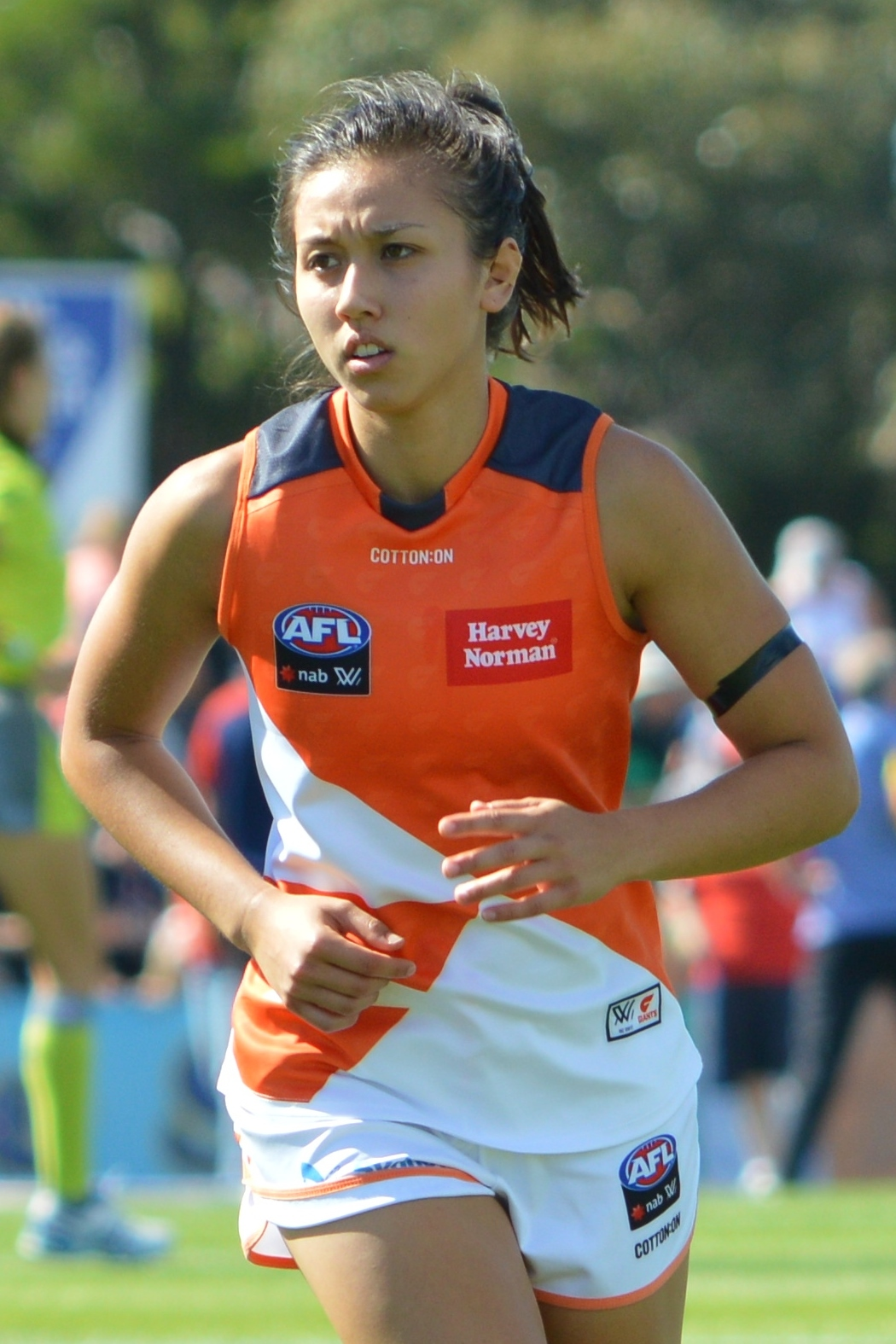
Rebecca Beeson, Greater Western Sydney games record holder

Updated to the end of the 2025 season.

**Bold**	Current player

Player	Games	Seasons
**Rebecca Beeson**	**73**	**2017–present**
**Alicia Eva**	**72**	**2018–present**
Pepa Randall	62	2018–2024
Nicola Barr	61	2017–2024
**Alyce Parker**	**61**	**2019–present**
**Haneen Zreika**	**58**	**2019–present**
**Katherine Smith**	**57**	**2021–present**
**Georgia Garnett**	**56**	**2020–present**
**Tarni Evans**	**51**	**2021–present**
Cora Staunton	50	2018–2022 (S7)

== Melbourne ==
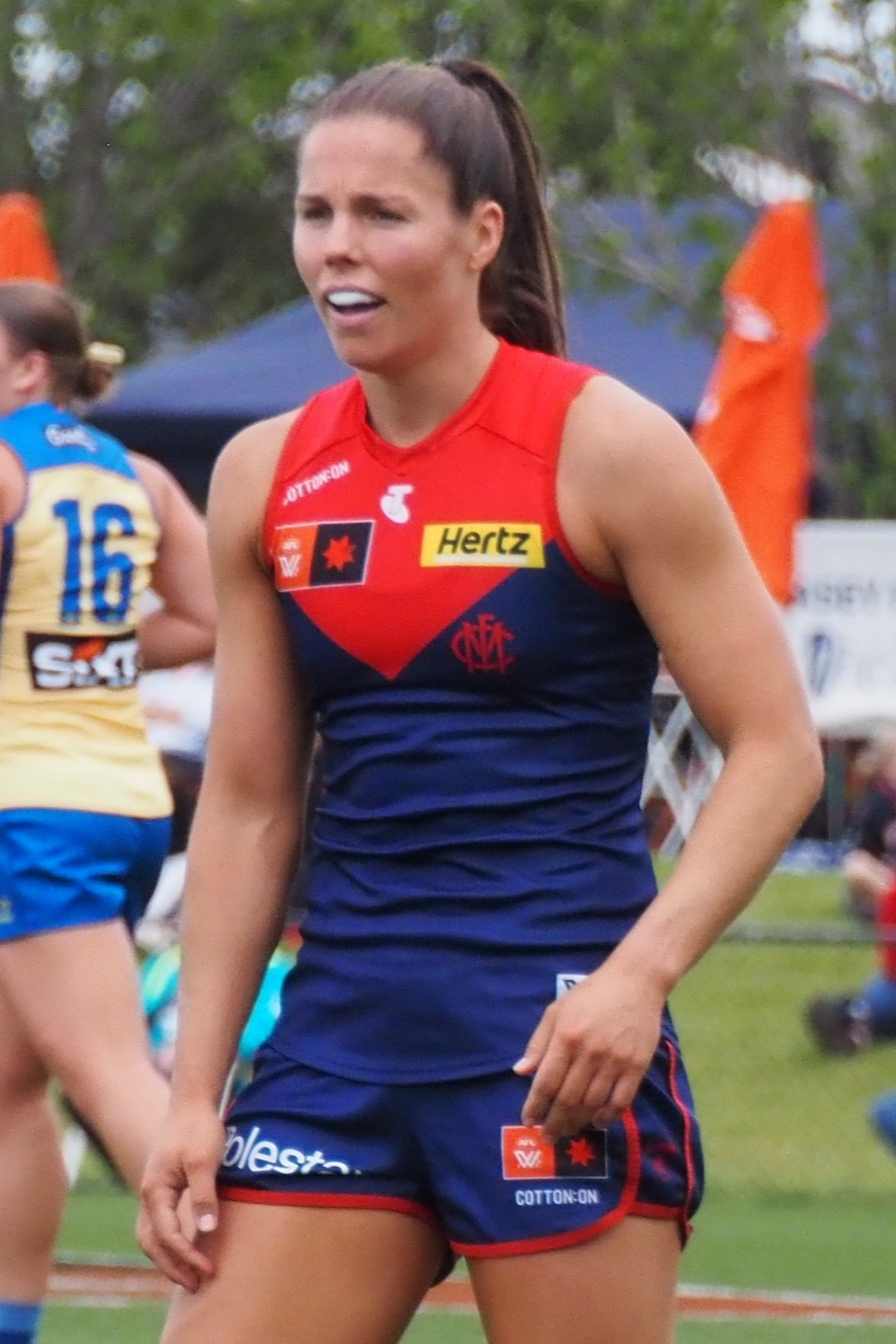
Kate Hore, Melbourne games record holder

Updated to the end of the 2025 season.

**Bold**	Current player

Player	Games	Seasons
**Kate Hore**	**93**	**2018–present**
**Paxy Paxman**	**92**	**2017–present**
**Lauren Pearce**	**87**	**2017–present**
**Tyla Hanks**	**87**	**2019–present**
Eden Zanker	86	2018–2025
Lily Mithen	83	2017–2024
**Sarah Lampard**	**78**	**2017–present**
**Shelley Heath**	**78**	**2019–present**
**Alyssa Bannan**	**74**	**2021–present**
**Sinéad Goldrick**	**61**	**2020–present**
**Megan Fitzsimon**	**60**	**2021–present**
**Eliza McNamara**	**59**	**2021–present**
Daisy Pearce	55	2017–2022 (S7)
Libby Birch	55	2020–2023

== North Melbourne ==
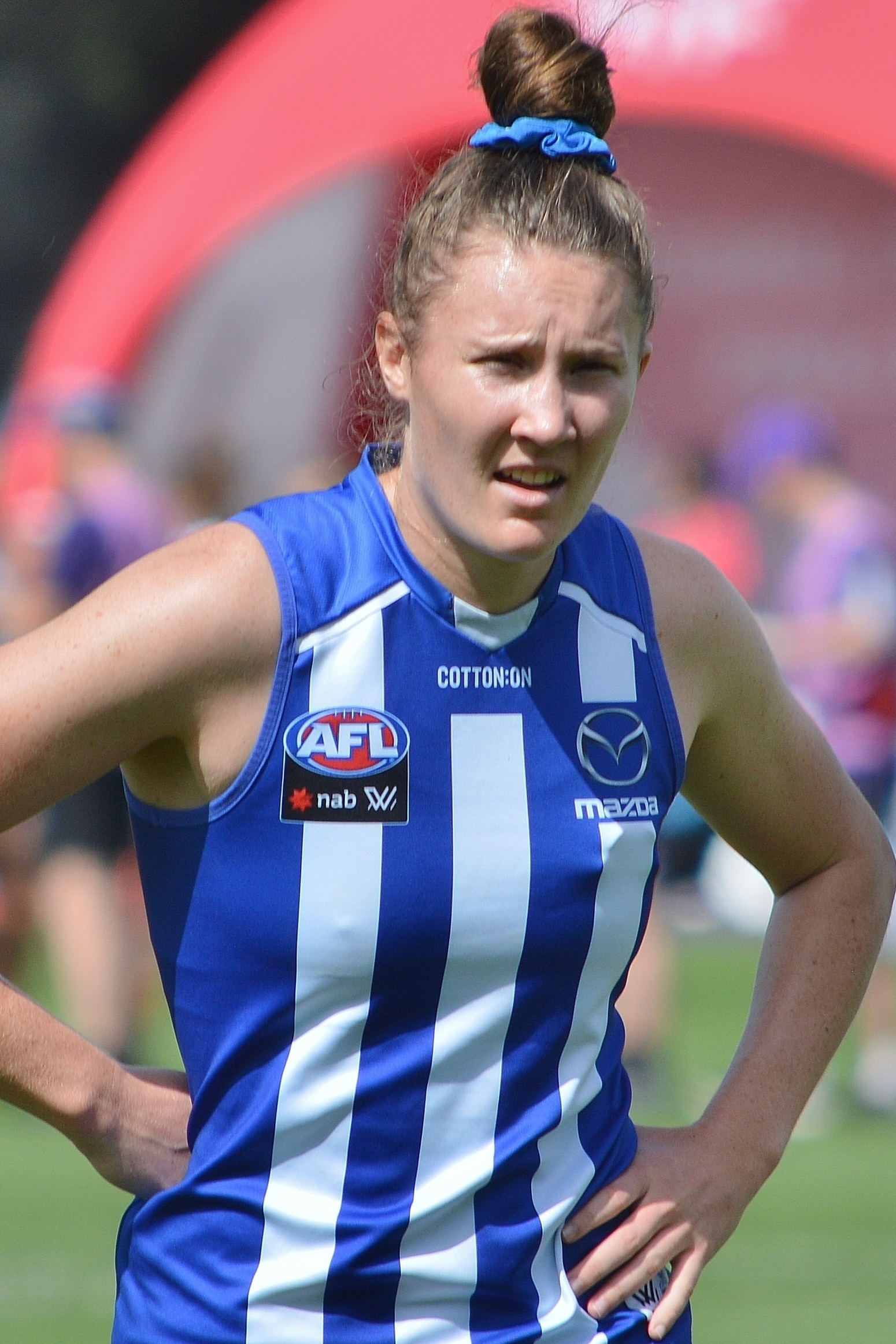
Tahlia Randall, North Melbourne games record holder

Updated to the end of the 2025 season.

**Bold**	Current player

Player	Games	Seasons
Tahlia Randall	90	2019–present
Jasmine Garner	89	2019–present
Ash Riddell	85	2019–present
Emma King	83	2019–present
Jenna Bruton	81	2019–present
Emma Kearney	79	2019–present
Bella Eddey	74	2021–present
Mia King	72	2020–present
Jasmine Ferguson	65	2022 (S6)–present
Nicole Bresnehan	64	2019–present
Kim Rennie	64	2022 (S6)–present
Sarah Wright	61	2020–present
Amy Smith	60	2021–present
Alice O'Loughlin	59	2021–present
Tess Craven	55	2022 (S6)–present
Erika O'Shea	50	2022 (S7)–present

== Richmond ==
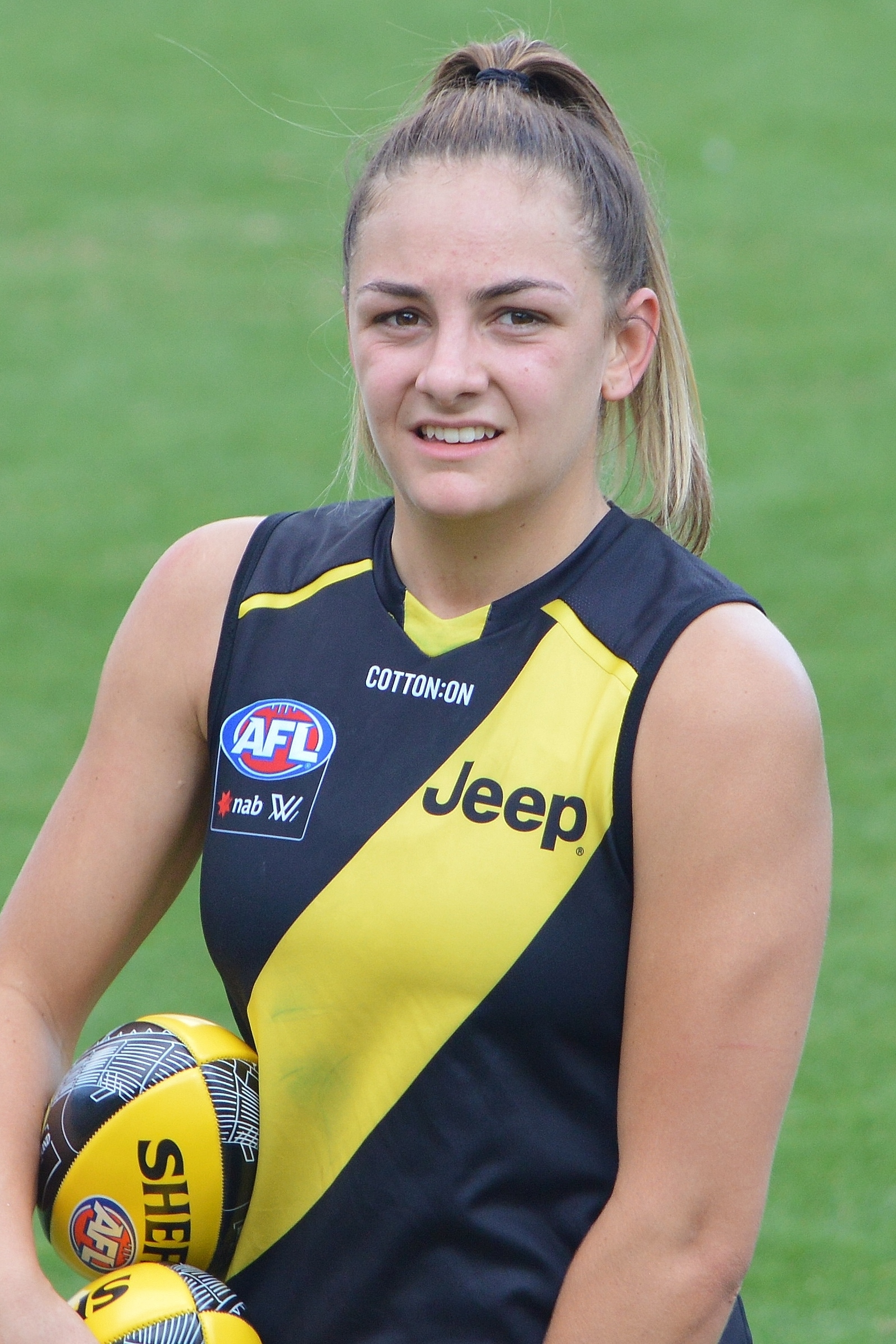
Monique Conti, Richmond games record holder

Updated to the end of the 2025 season.

**Bold**	Current player

Player	Games	Seasons
Monique Conti	70	2020–present
Gabby Seymour	65	2020–present
Kate Dempsey	65	2020–present
Rebecca Miller	62	2020–present
Katie Brennan	61	2020–present
Beth Lynch	54	2022 (S6)–present
Laura McClelland	50	2020–present
Emelia Yassir	50	2022 (S6)–present

== St Kilda ==
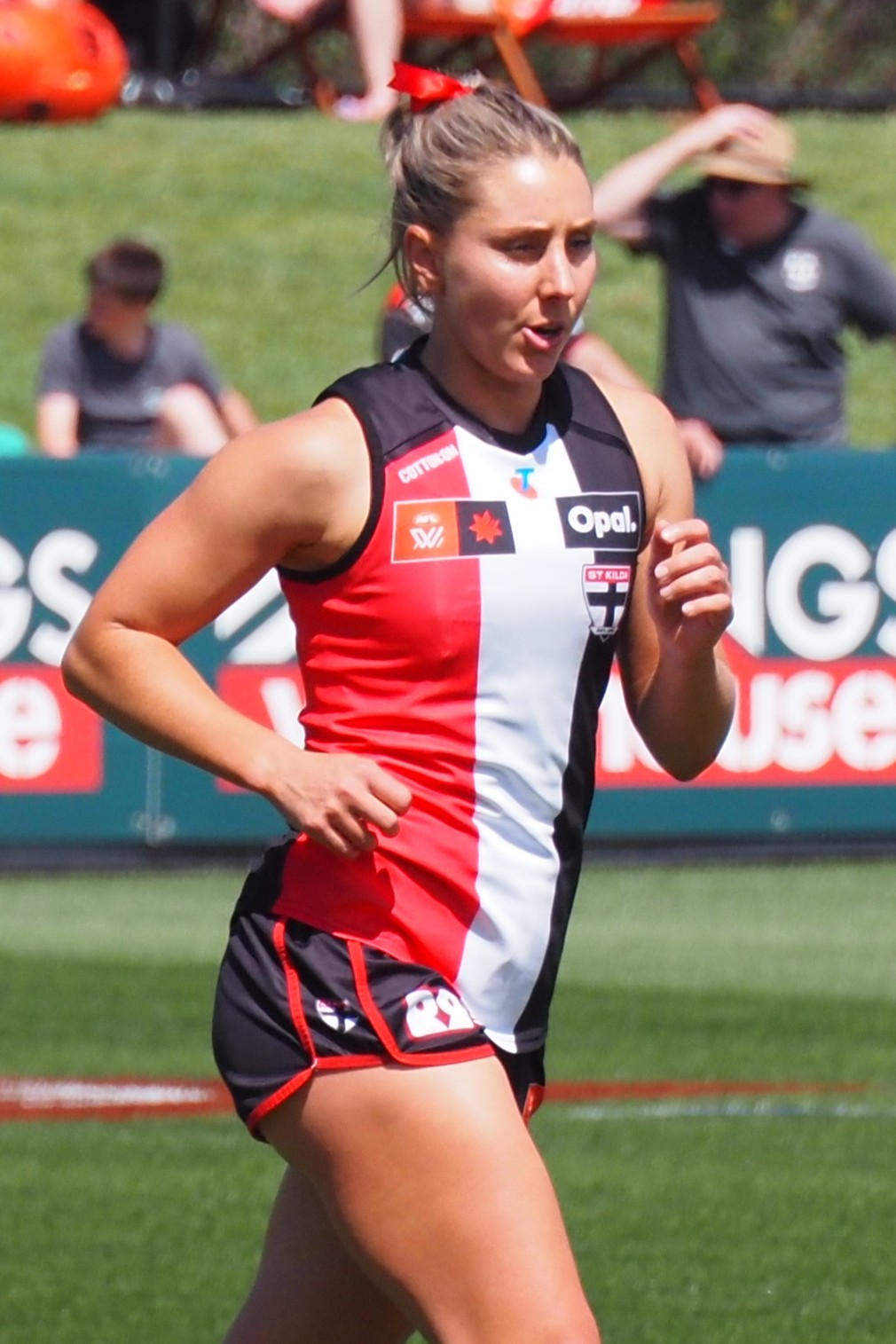
Hannah Priest, St Kilda games record holder

Updated to the end of the 2025 season.

**Bold**	Current player

Player	Games	Seasons
**Hannah Priest**	**69**	**2020–present**
**Darcy Guttridge**	**57**	**2020–present**
**Molly McDonald**	**55**	**2020–present**
**Alice Burke**	**55**	**2021–present**
**Bianca Jakobsson**	**52**	**2021–present**

== West Coast ==
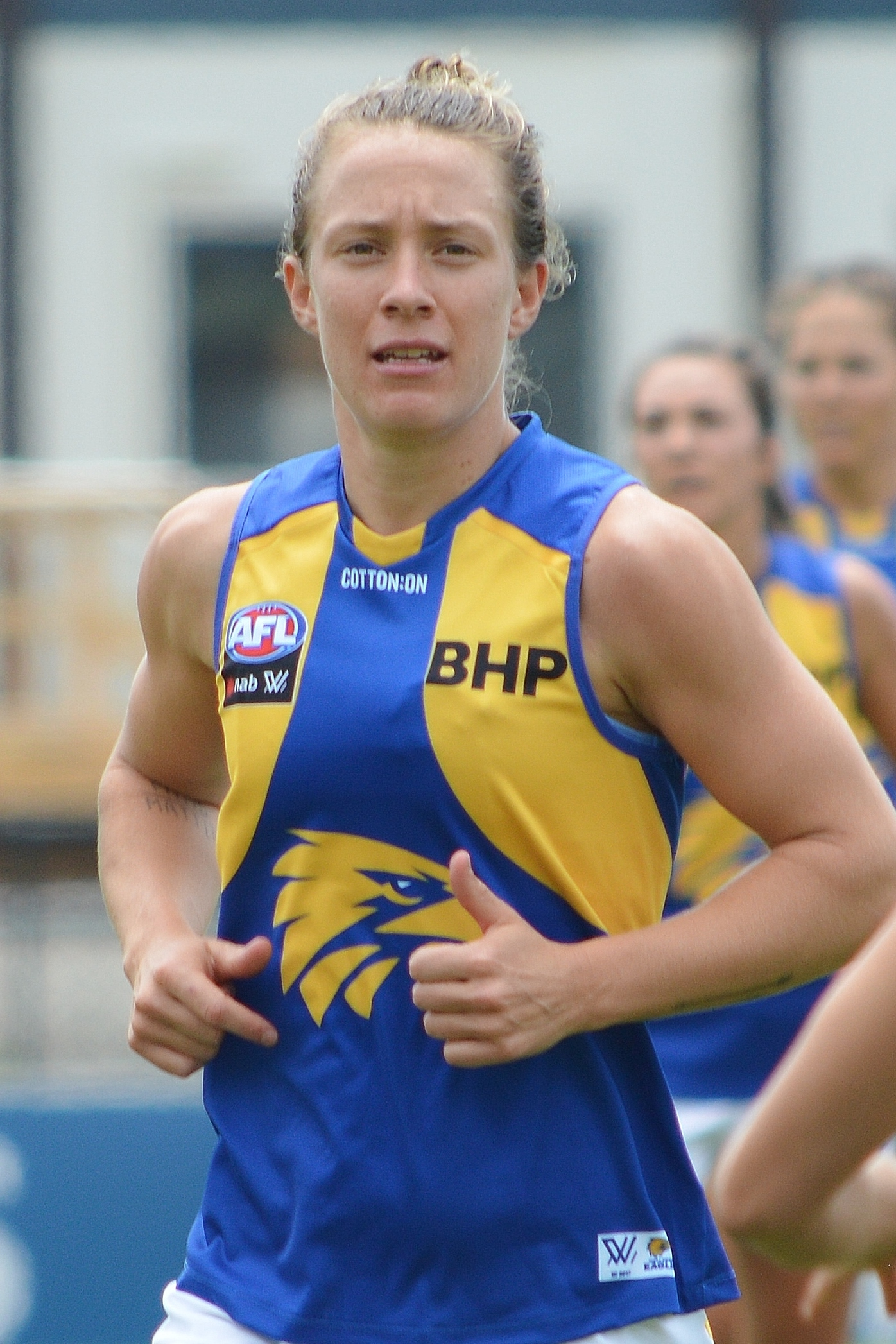
Emma Swanson, West Coast games record holder

Updated to the end of the 2025 season.

**Bold**	Current player

Player	Games	Seasons
**Emma Swanson**	**64**	**2020–present**
**Bella Lewis**	**63**	**2021–present**
**Belinda Smith**	**60**	**2020–present**
**Kellie Gibson**	**56**	**2020–present**
**Charlie Thomas**	**54**	**2022 (S6)–present**

== Western Bulldogs ==
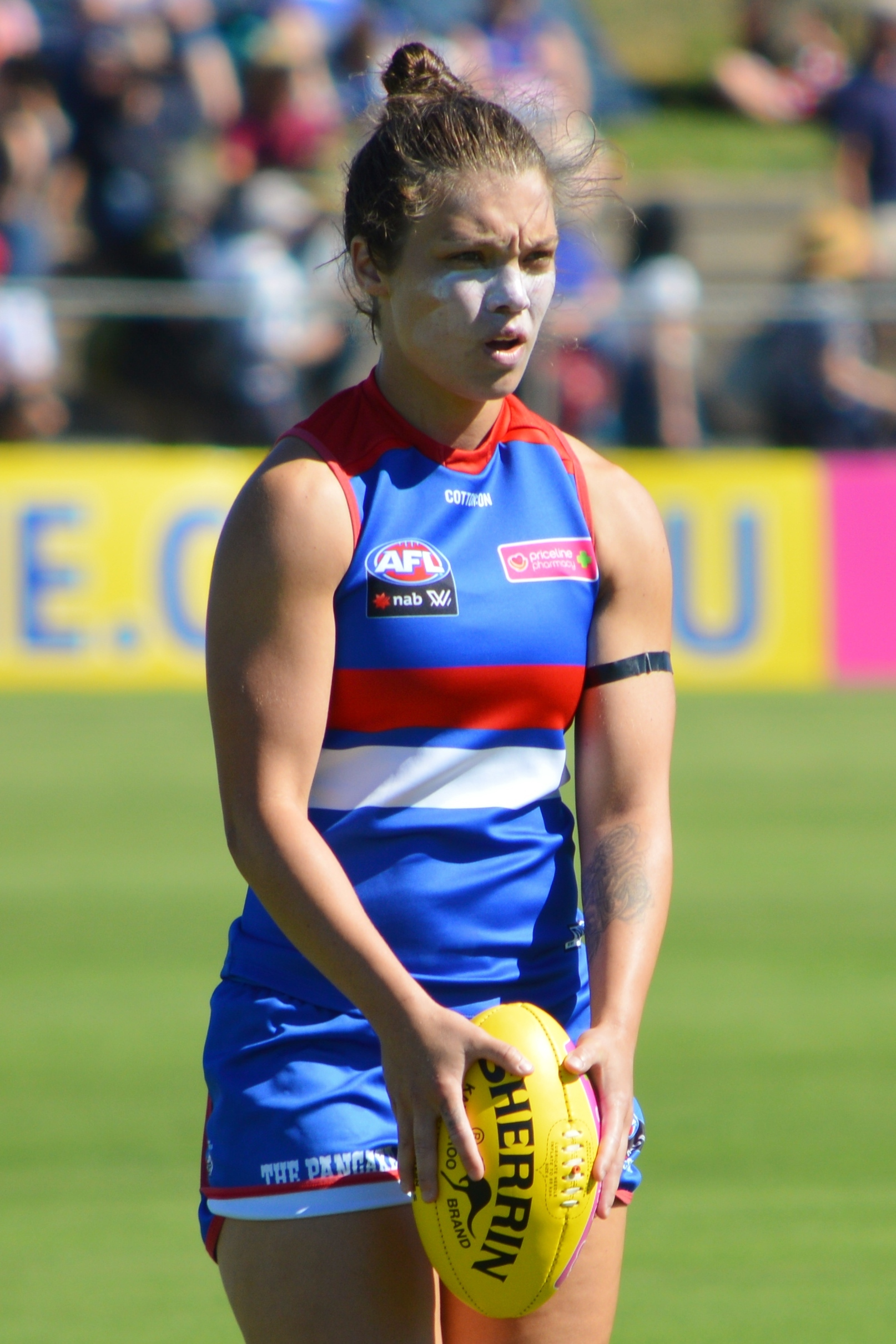
Ellie Blackburn, Western Bulldogs games record holder

Updated to the end of the 2025 season.

**Bold**	Current player

Player	Games	Seasons
**Ellie Blackburn**	**83**	**2017–present**
Kirsty Lamb	67	2017–2023
**Jess Fitzgerald**	**63**	**2021–present**
Naomi Ferres	62	2018–2025
**Elisabeth Georgostathis**	**62**	**2020–present**
**Sarah Hartwig**	**61**	**2021–present**
**Deanna Berry**	**58**	**2018–present**
**Isabella Grant**	**55**	**2020–present**
**Isabelle Pritchard**	**55**	**2021–present**
**Alice Edmonds**	**52**	**2022 (S6)–present**
Bailey Hunt	50	2017–2023

== See also ==
- AFL Women's games records
- List of VFL/AFL players to have played 200 games for one club

== Sources ==
- Every AFLW player at AustralianFootball.com
