= Ken Christie =

Australian rules footballer

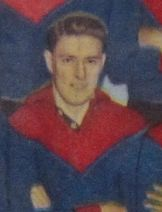

Personal information
- Full name: Ken Christie
- Born: 28 August 1927
- Died: 17 August 2017 (aged 89)
- Original team: Echuca
- Height: 185 cm (6 ft 1 in)
- Weight: 83 kg (183 lb)
- Position: Utility

Playing career^{1}
| Years | Club | Games (Goals) |
| 1951–55 | Melbourne | 70 (9) |
- ^{1} Playing statistics correct to the end of 1955.

Ken Christie (28 August 1927 – 17 August 2017) was an Australian rules footballer who played with Melbourne in the Victorian Football League (VFL) during the early 1950s.

Echuca recruit Ken Christie was a utility player, seen mostly in the ruck and resting in defence. He was one of six debutantes for Melbourne in the opening game of the 1951 season, the most notable of those being John Beckwith. Melbourne would have a poor year and Christie, who played in ten of their games, failed to experience a win. He was part of team success in 1954 and played in their Grand Final side which went down to Footscray.
