= Wally Donald =

Australian rules footballer, born 1927

Personal information
- Full name: Walter Donald
- Born: 27 May 1927; Fitzroy
- Died: 8 November 2003 (aged 76); Footscray
- Original team: Braybrook
- Height: 178 cm (5 ft 10 in)
- Weight: 80 kg (176 lb)

Playing career^{1}
Years	Club	Games (Goals)
1946–1958	Footscray	205 (1)

Coaching career
Years	Club	Games (W–L–D)
1952–1953	Footscray	3 (1–2–0)
- ^{1} Playing statistics correct to the end of 1958.

Career highlights
- VFL premiership player: 1954; Footscray captain: 1956; Con Curtain trophy: 1949; Sporting Life team of the year: 1954

Walter Donald (27 May 1927 – 8 November 2003) was an Australian rules footballer who played for the Footscray Football Club in the Victorian Football League (VFL).

== Career ==
Although Donald played only one senior game in the 1946 season for Braybrook, from 1947 to 1957 he was a fixture of the Footscray team and missed only eight of 206 games. Recruited by Footscray as a versatile player, he was originally seen as part of the team's midfield; he was moved to defence as his defensive abilities became apparent, and by 1948 he was established on the half-back flank. Donald played his first final in 1948, named on the half-back flank in the first semi-final against Collingwood.

He played full back at the start of the 1949 season, despite his height—5 feet 8 inches (173 cm)—conceding reach and strength to his opponents. Donald moved to the back pocket in 1951, his best-known position throughout his career. This was due to the recruitment of full-back Herb Henderson, who—at 188 centimetres (6 ft 2 in)—was more typical in size for a fullback. The position change would have been sooner, since Henderson's first season at Footscray was 1950. Since he only played one game, the position changes were not noticeable; Donald's output was undiminished, as he and Henderson quickly established a bond on the last defensive line. The improvement was quick; the Bulldogs conceded 1,608 points in 1950 (an average of 89.3 points per game) and 1,105 points in 1951 (an average of 64.7 per game). Thanks to the defensive partnership, Footscray again made the finals. They fell short against Essendon, however, losing by eight points in the first semifinal. Donald was voted Footscray's most valuable player.

He kicked the only goal of his career in 1952, in round eight against St Kilda at Yallourn Oval during the National Day Round. After Footscray kicked only two goals by three-quarter time in poor conditions, Donald was sent forward in the last quarter and kicked a left-footed goal. Although Footscray outscored St Kilda in the second half, they lost the game by 15 points. The goal made Donald the only player with two streaks of 100 games without a goal; the Yallourn game was his 102nd. 1952 was a good season for Donald, who was runner-up for the club's best and fairest award.

Donald's rapport with Henderson continued to develop during the early 1950s, as they (with defensive staples Dave Bryden and Jim Gallagher) conceding only 959 points in the 1953 season. Statistically, it was the greatest defence since the introduction of 12-team competition in 1925 and the greatest defence of all time since 1920. Footscray again made the finals in 1953, and was victorious (against Essendon, by eight points) for the first time in club history. Donald was again named one of Footscray's best players. It was John Coleman's last-ever final, since he sustained a career-ending knee injury midway during the following season. Coleman, well-held by Donald and Henderson, kicked only one goal that day. Footscray faced Geelong in the preliminary final, needing to win to make their first-ever grand final. Although they led at halftime, Footscray lost by 26 points. Donald was again named Footscray's most valuable player, and was the club's best and fairest runner-up for the second consecutive year.

Footscray won their first VFL premiership in 1954. After finishing the home-and-away season in second place, they played Geelong for the second straight season for a spot in the grand final. With captain Charlie Sutton sidelined by injury, Donald captained the club to victory. With the score tied at three-quarter time, Footscray kicked 4.9 to 1.4 in the final quarter to win by 23 points and advance to their first grand final. Donald was carried off the field after the game ended. Sutton returned for the 1954 VFL Grand Final and Donald was again vice-captain as Footscray easily defeated Melbourne with a final score of 15.12.102 to 7.9.51. The game was Donald's 150th game for Footscray, who was again runner-up for the club's best and fairest award. The following season, Footscray missed a spot in the finals by 0.6 percent.

With Sutton announcing his retirement at the conclusion of round five of the 1956 VFL season, Donald became the full-time captain for the remainder of the season. Footscray returned to the finals, finishing in fourth place at the end of the home-and-away season, and again faced Geelong in the first semi-final. The club played well for the ageing Donald, coming from behind to defeat Geelong by two points. In difficult conditions, in front of almost 80,000 people, only 11 goals were scored in the whole game (just one in the second half). Footscray trailed the Cats by two points at three-quarter time, but kicked 0.5.5 to 0.1.1 in the final quarter to advance to the preliminary final. They were defeated by Collingwood by 39 points, despite more scoring shots.

At the start of the 1957 VFL season, Donald resigned as captain (as Footscray opted for youthful leadership) and stepped down from all leadership positions in the club as his career drew to a close. The team's oldest player, he played 17 of 18 games and played his 200th VFL game late in the season. Although Donald wanted to play one more season, he retired two rounds into the 1958 season after playing 205 games for Footscray. He played in eight finals (winning four), one premiership and represented Victoria three times during his career. When Donald retired, only Arthur Olliver and Alby Morrison had played more games for Footscray and only more games at the Western Oval; Donald is now sixth on that list. Only two players have played more VFL-AFL games with just one career goal.

== Later life ==
After retiring from VFL football, Donald was a scout for Footscray and coached junior football clubs. He was selected on the half-back flank in the Western Bulldogs Team of the Century in May 2002. Donald died on 8 November 2003 after a long illness, and was posthumously inducted into the Western Bulldogs Hall of Fame in 2012.
