= Ralph Lane (footballer) =

Australian rules footballer

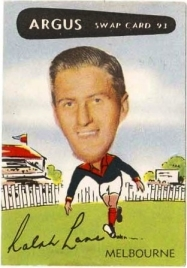

Personal information
- Full name: Ralph Lane
- Born: 16 March 1930
- Died: 29 May 2014 (aged 84)
- Original team: Frankston (MPFL)
- Height: 178 cm (5 ft 10 in)
- Weight: 76 kg (168 lb)
- Position: Wing

Playing career^{1}
Years	Club	Games (Goals)
1951–1956	Melbourne	71 (9)
- ^{1} Playing statistics correct to the end of 1956.

Career highlights
- Premiership player 1956

Ralph Lane (16 March 1930 – 29 May 2014) was an Australian rules footballer who played in the Victorian Football League (VFL).

Ralph Lane joined Melbourne in 1951 and played two Grand Finals in 1954 and 1956. He retired in 1956 to commit to his business career, though he continued playing with McKinnon in the Federal Football League, winning three premierships from 1957 to 1959.

Lane was made a life member of the Melbourne Football Club and the VFL in 1989.
