= Herb Henderson (Australian footballer) =

Australian rules footballer (1930–2022)

Personal information
- Full name: Herbert John Henderson
- Born: 13 September 1930
- Died: 31 July 2022 (aged 91)
- Original team: Mildura Imperials
- Height: 188 cm (6 ft 2 in)
- Weight: 83 kg (183 lb)
- Position: Full-back

Playing career^{1}
Years	Club	Games (Goals)
1950–1958	Footscray	130 (0)
- ^{1} Playing statistics correct to the end of 1958.

Career highlights
- VFL premiership player: 1954

Herbert John Henderson (13 September 1930 – 31 July 2022) was an Australian rules footballer who was recruited by Footscray Football Club (now Western Bulldogs), in the Victorian Football League, now AFL from Mildura Imperials for the 1950 season. Henderson played in Imperials FC 1949 Sunraysia Football League's premiership team.

In 1950, Henderson could get no higher than second reserve, but the following year he established himself firmly, and was one of a number of new players who drove Footscray from tenth to fourth on the ladder.

He was regarded as perhaps the finest full-back of his time, with a reputation for keeping the best full-forwards, including champion John Coleman, to low scores. Coleman never had more than four goals in five contests with him. Henderson was fairly tall at 187 cm (6 feet 2 inches) but slightly built for a key position player. Nonetheless he had the acceleration to beat any full-forward over a short distance.

His understanding with back-pocket Wally Donald made for an almost impassable backline, which conceded 959 points in 1953 – the lowest since the beginning of 12-club competition in 1925. In the following two years, Footscray's defence was almost as good. Despite finishing out of the Final Four by 0.6 percent in 1955, Footscray still had the best defence of any team, conceding fifteen fewer points than top team Melbourne.

He was Footscray's full-back in the 1954 premiership team and retired in 1958 after 130 games. He was named full-back in the Western Bulldogs Team of the Century.
