= Herb Henderson (American football) =

American football player (1899–1991)

Profile
- Positions: Halfback, Wingback

Personal information
- Born: June 21, 1899; Oberlin, Ohio
- Died: January 14, 1991 (aged 91); Odon, Indiana
- Listed height: 5 ft 11 in (1.80 m)
- Listed weight: 170 lb (77 kg)

Career information
- College: Ohio State, Oberlin College

Career history
- Evansville Crimson Giants (1921)
- Stats at Pro Football Reference

Herbert Raymond Henderson (June 21, 1899 – January 14, 1991) was a professional football player in the early 1920s. He played for one season for the Evansville Crimson Giants of the National Football League in 1921. Prior to playing pro football, Henderson played at the college level at Ohio State. There he was a starting halfback on the Buckeyes 1920 Big Ten Championship team. He also participated in the 1921 Rose Bowl Game. He later served as a football coach at Central High School in Evansville, Indiana for 4 years with a record of 26–8–2. After his coaching career ended, Henderson became an Athletic Business Manager. He stayed in that position for 5 years. He then made his mark as a Football Official in Indiana and was a grader of the Big Ten Conference officials for several years. He was the 86th person inducted into the Indiana Football Hall of Fame on November 30, 1979.

== Evansville Crimson Giants ==
In 1921, the Crimson Giants' first year as a professional squad, Henderson led the team in total scoring by accounting for 29 of their 89 points on the season. Starting in four games that year as both a wingback and placekicker, Henderson accumulated four rushing touchdowns and five extra-point conversions. All four of his touchdowns came in the team's final game of the season, playing host to the Cincinnati Celts. According to ESPN Statistics and Information, Henderson was for 93 years the only NFL player to enter a game with no career touchdowns and finish that game with four or more. This feat stood independently until 2014, when it was matched by New England Patriots running back Jonas Gray in a matchup against the Indianapolis Colts.

During a 1921 game against the Hammond Pros, Henderson stated that the Hammond players met with him during the game and asked if he could tone down his hits because the Hammond players still needed to be healthy for work on Monday. Henderson, a high school football coach, refused and stated that he needed to show his players, who were sitting in the stands watching him, "how tackling was done".
