= Herb H. Henderson =

American attorney and civil rights activist (1929–2007)

- Born: June 23, 1929; McDowell County, West Virginia, U.S.
- Died: October 16, 2007 (aged 78); Huntington, West Virginia, U.S.
- Education: West Virginia State College (BA); George Washington University (JD)
- Occupation: Attorney
- Spouse: Maxine Henderson
- Children: 4

Herbert H. Henderson (June 23, 1929 – October 16, 2007) was an American attorney and civil rights activist from Huntington, West Virginia. He was also president of the West Virginia National Association for the Advancement of Colored People (NAACP) for 20 years.

== Early life and education ==
Henderson was born in McDowell County, West Virginia, to John and Elnora Henderson. He graduated from West Virginia State College in 1953. He earned a Juris Doctor from George Washington University Law School in 1958, where he was the first black student to graduate.

== Career ==
Henderson founded a law practice in Huntington after graduating from George Washington University. Some of his notable cases include NAACP v. West Virginia Department of Public Safety, which allowed African American women to be admitted to the West Virginia State Police. He was president of the West Virginia National Association for the Advancement of Colored People (NAACP) for 20 years, from 1966 to 1986. Henderson also worked as general counsel for the National NAACP in 1984 and again from 1989 through 1990.

== Personal life ==
Henderson was married to Maxine Henderson for 49 years. The couple had four daughters. Henderson died on October 16, 2007.

He was preceded in death by his wife. Prior to his death, Henderson was honored with the NAACP William Robert Ming Advocacy Award in 1995 as someone who "exemplifies the spirit of financial and personal sacrifice that Ming displayed in his legal work for the NAACP." Three of the daughters followed his interest in law and are attorneys in Huntington. His daughter, Cheryl Henderson, is the first African American Municipal Judge in Huntington.
