= List of VFL/AFL and AFL Women's players from Tasmania =

This is a list of players from Tasmania to have played in the Australian Football League (AFL) and the AFL Women's (AFLW), the two pre-eminent competitions of Australian rules football.

== List of players ==
=== Men's ===
==== Current Players ====
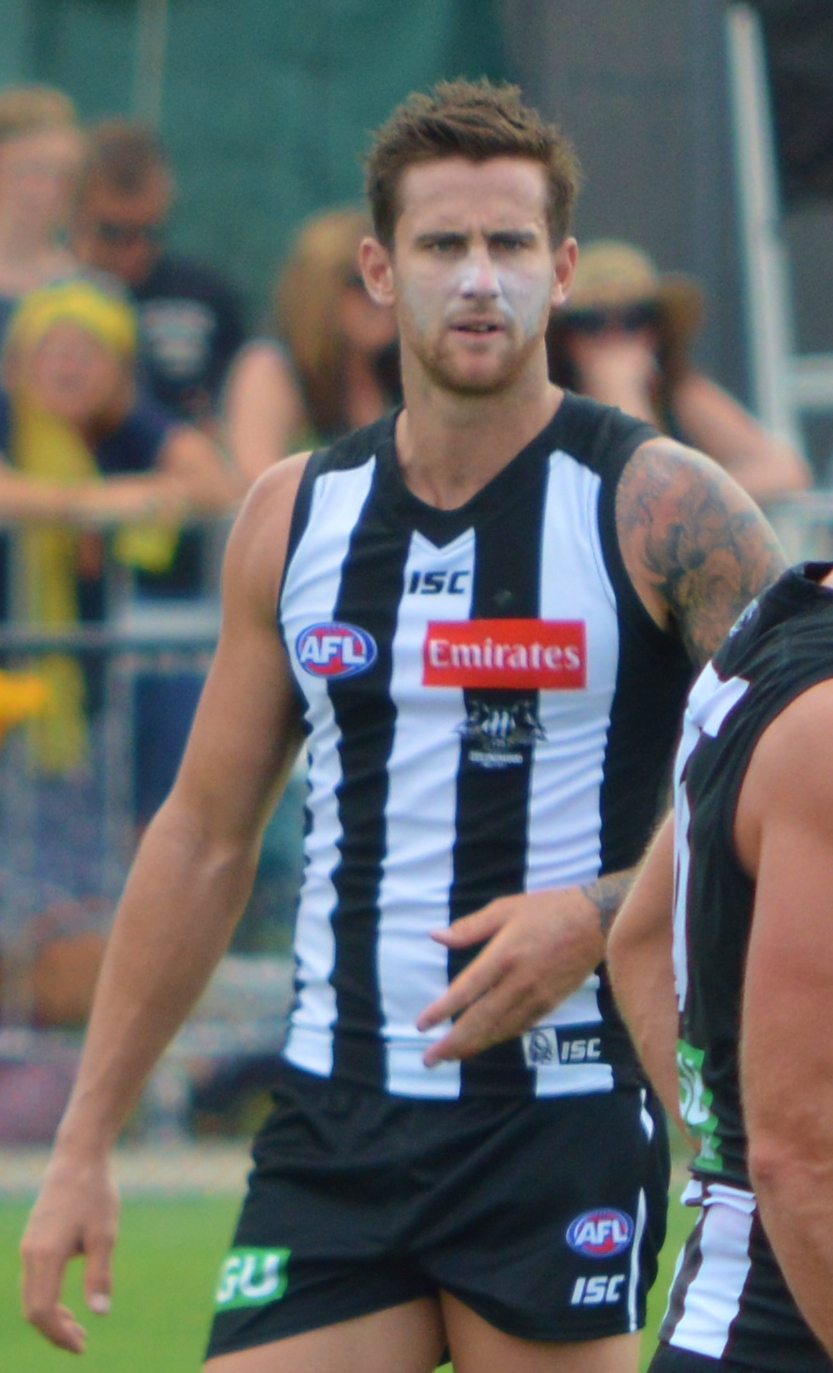
Jeremy Howe is from Hobart

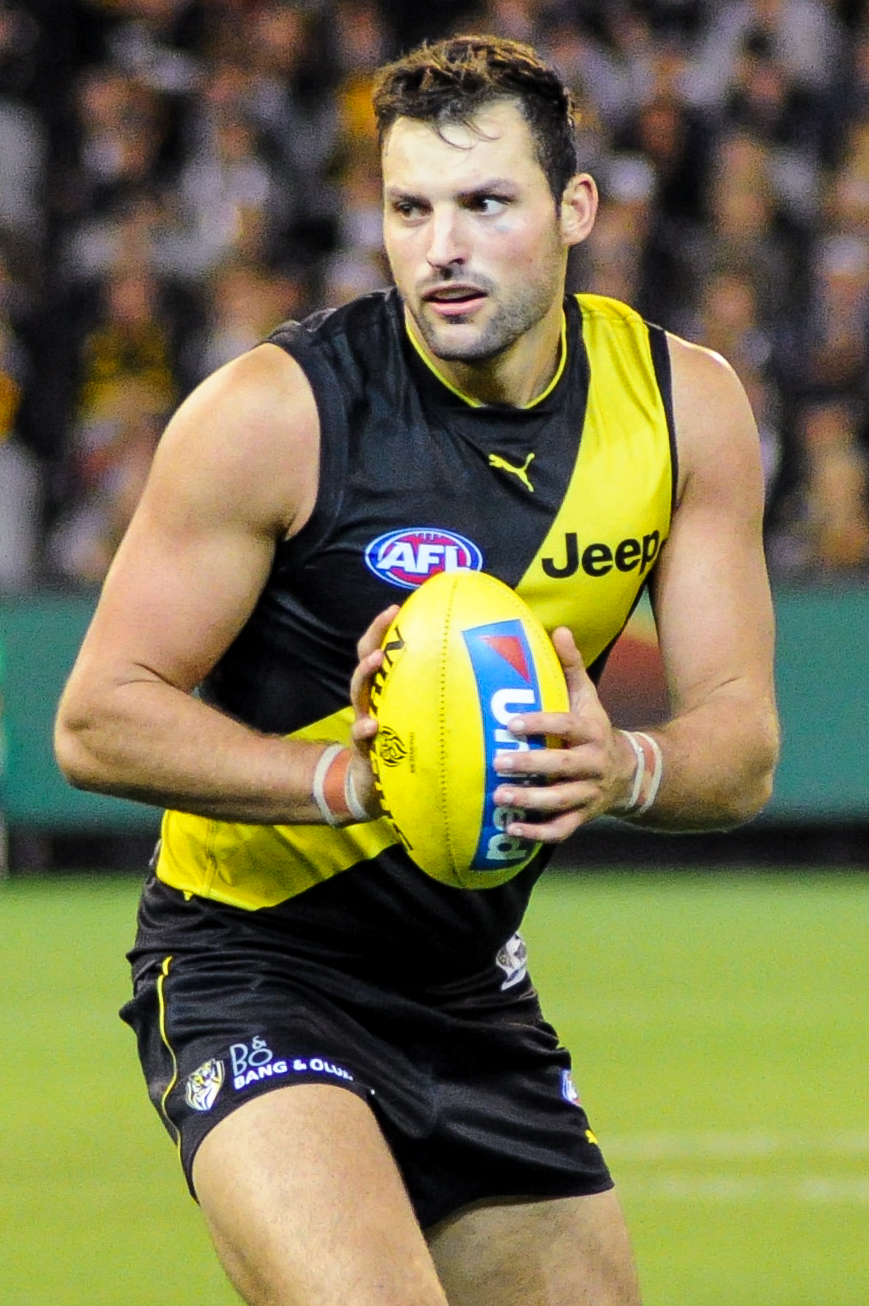
Toby Nankervis is from Launceston

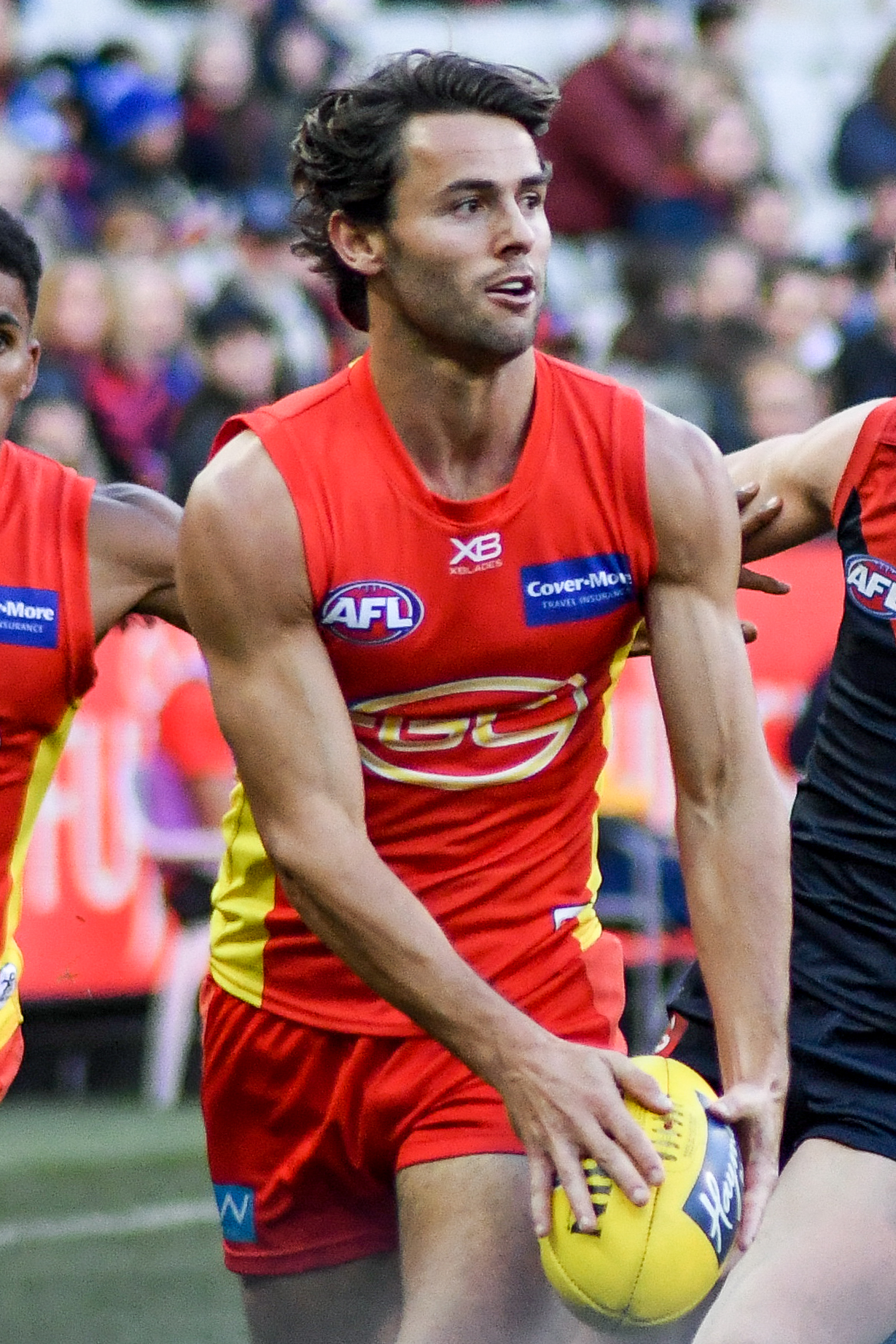
Lachie Weller is from Burnie

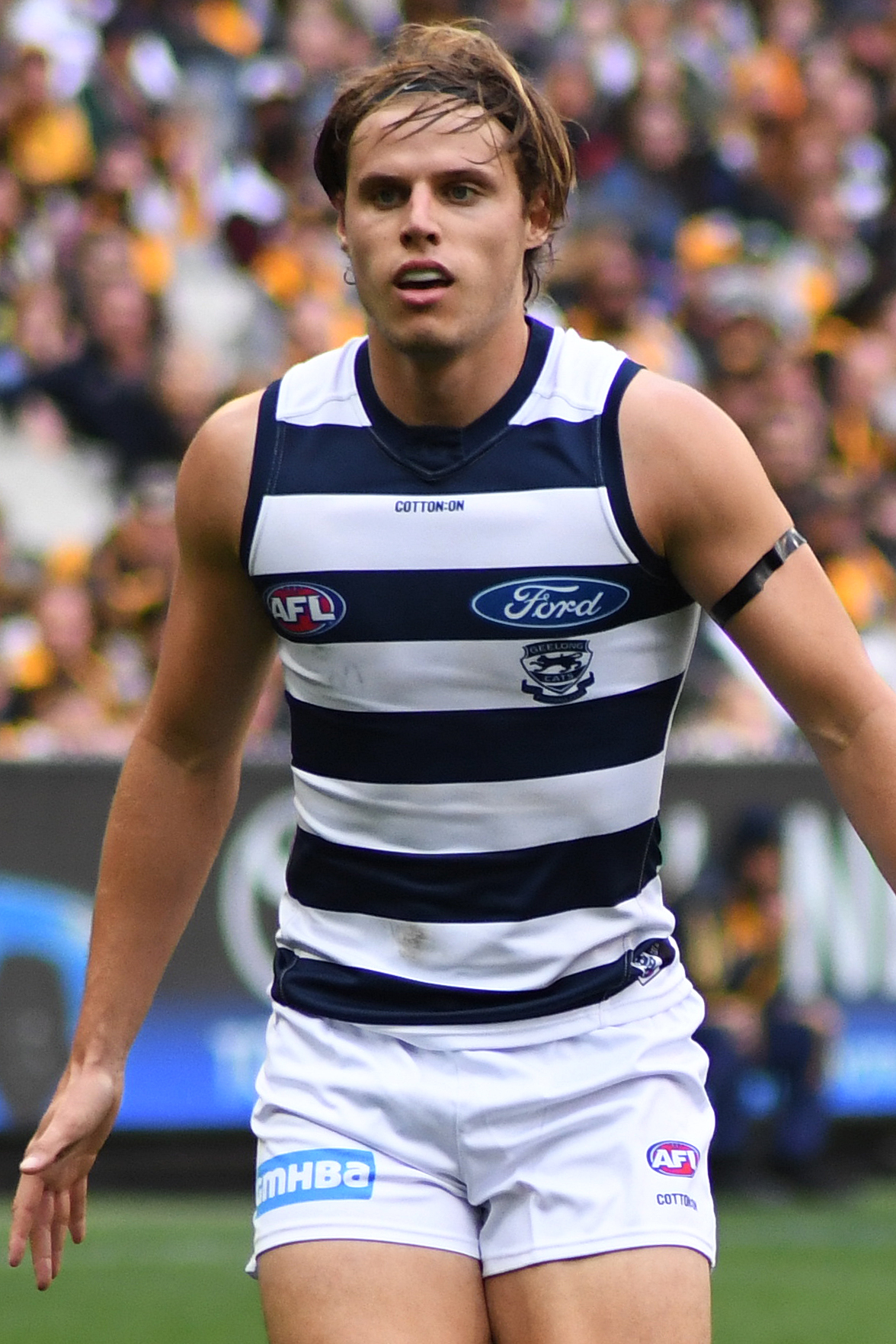
Jake Kolodjashnij is from Launceston

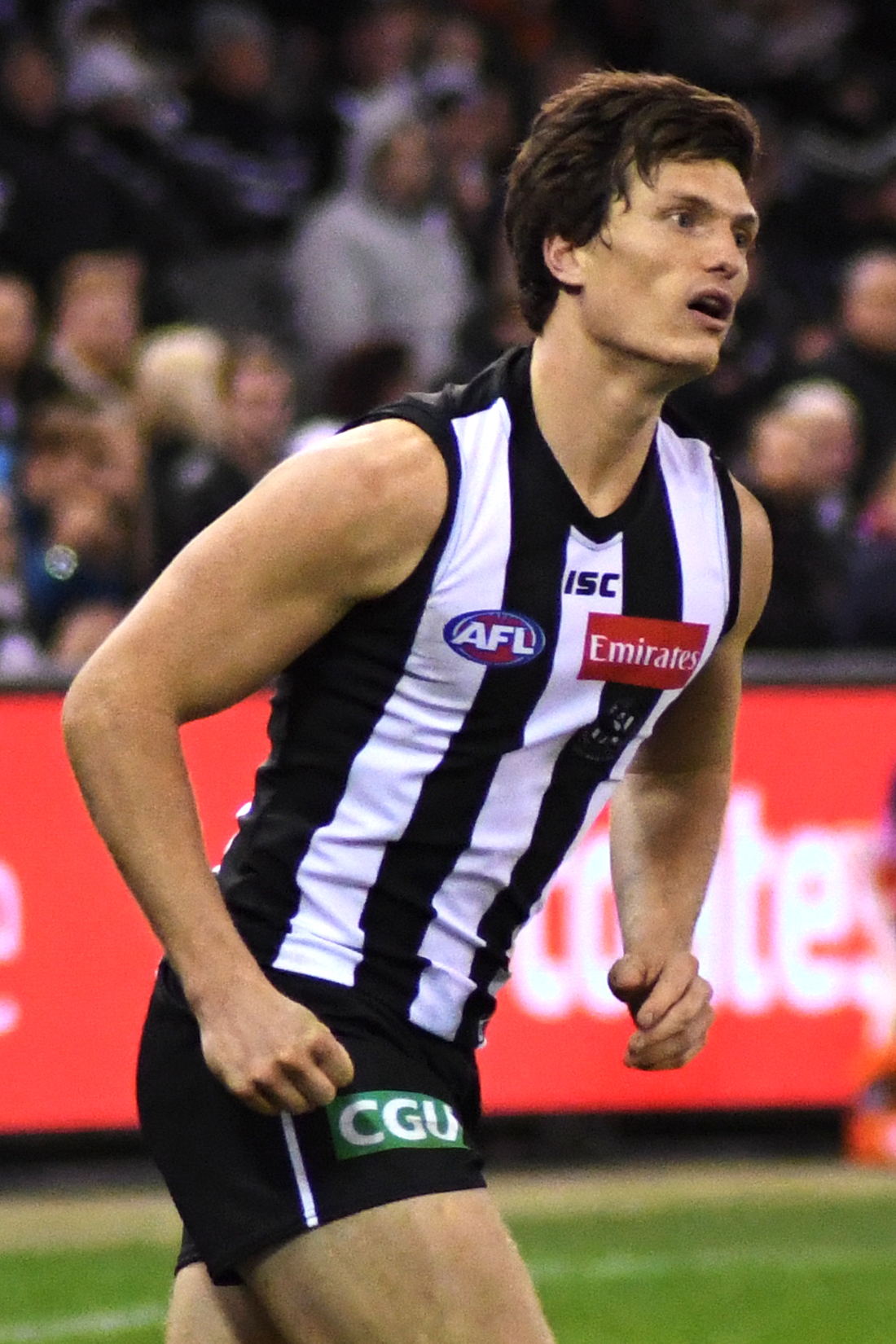
Brody Mihocek is from Burnie

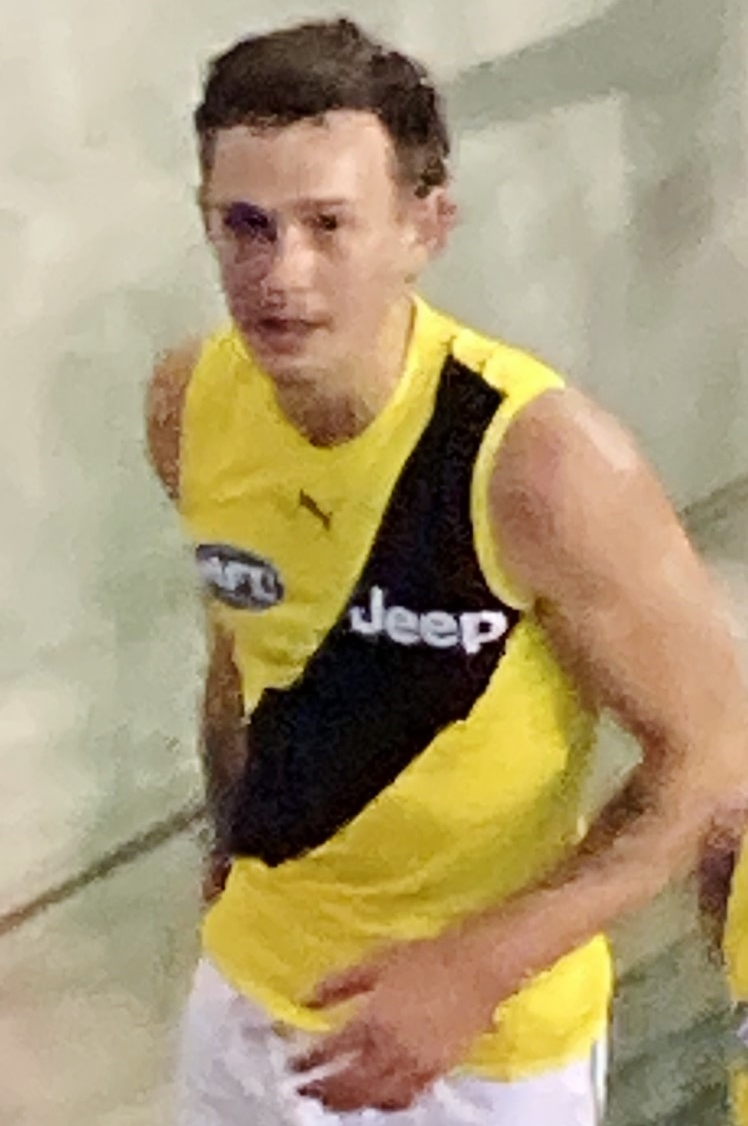
Rhyan Mansell is from Launceston

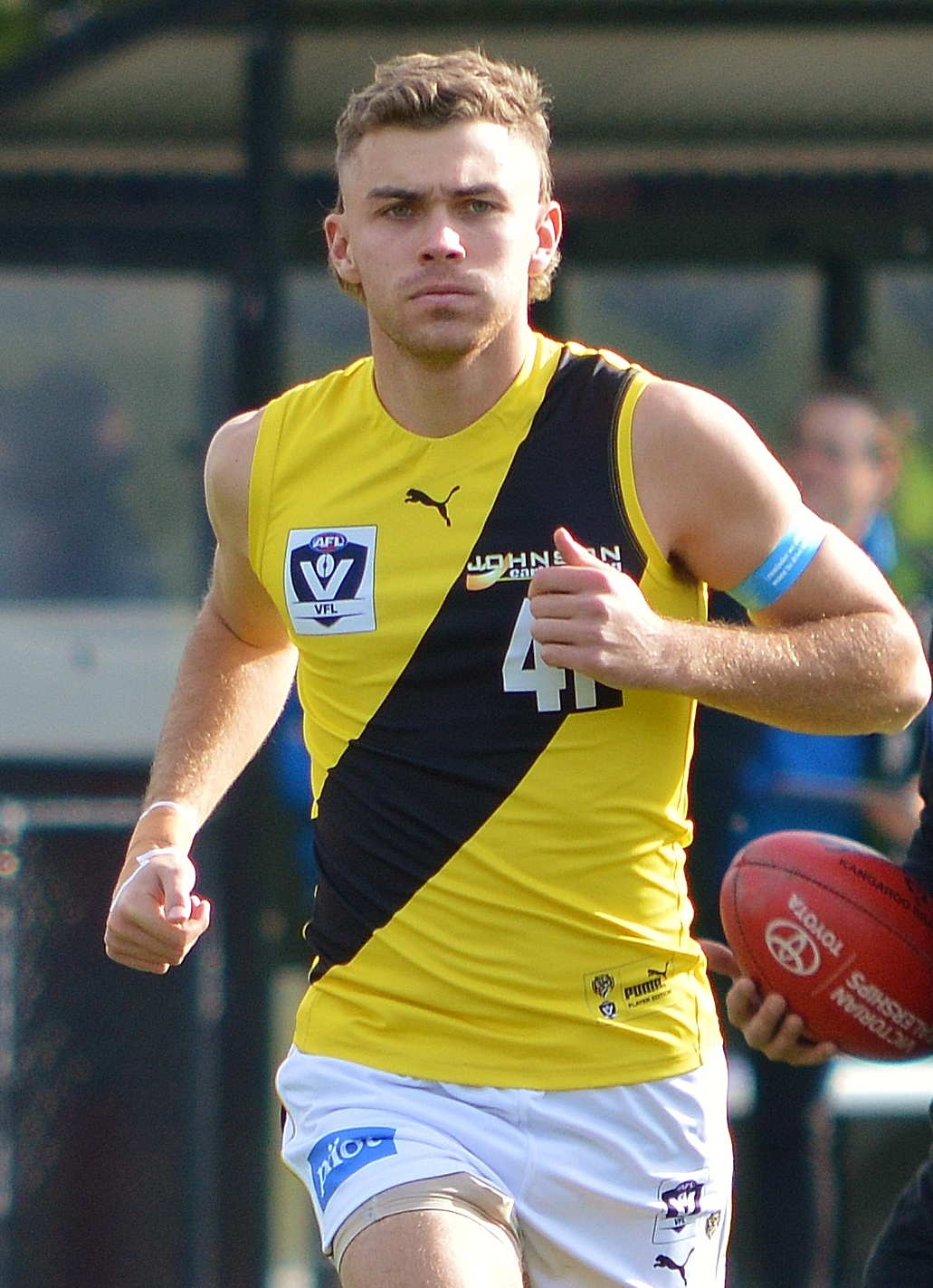
Sam Banks is from Whitefoord

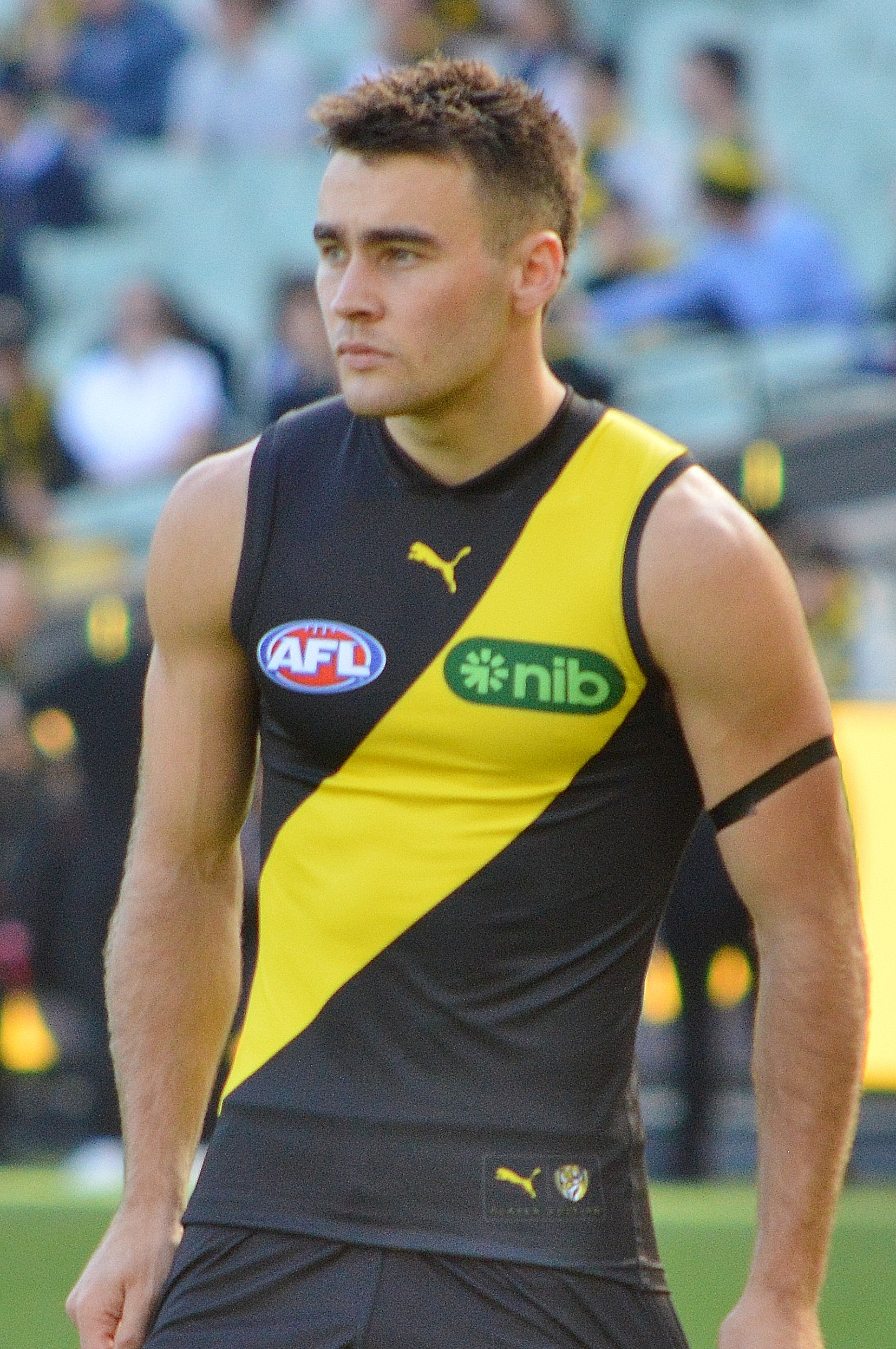
Seth Campbell is from Burnie

==== AFL Players from Tasmania ====
Currently on an AFL senior list

Player	TAS junior/senior club/s	Representative honours	AFL Draft	Selection (TAS club)	AFL Years	AFL Games	AFL (Goals)	Connections to Tasmania, Notes & References
Geordie Payne	North Launceston, Tasmania Devils (U18)	U18	2024		2025-	3	3	Raised in Burnie
James Leake	Launceston, Tasmania Devils (U18)	U18	2023	#17	2025-	3	1	Raised in Launceston
Arie Schoenmaker	Launceston College, Launceston, Tasmania Devils (U18)	U18	2023	#62	2024-	5	0	Raised in Launceston
Ryley Sanders	North Launceston, Tasmania Devils (U18)	U18 (2021)	2023	#6	2024-	32	13	Raised in Launceston
Colby McKercher	Launceston, Tasmania Devils (U18)	U18	2023	#2	2024-	39	12	Raised in Launceston
Seth Campbell	Burnie Dockers, North Launceston	U18 (2022)	2023 (Rookie)	(Rookie #12)	2024-	43	38	Raised in Burnie
Sam Banks	Clarence, Tasmanian Devils	U18	2021	#29	2023-	43	6	Raised in Whitefoord
Lachlan Cowan	Devonport, North Launceston, Tasmanian Devils	U18 (2019, 2021)	2022	#30	2023-	38	2	Raised in Devonport
Jye Menzie	North Hobart, Tasmanian Devils	U18 (2019, 2021)	2022	#15	2022-2025	47	36	Raised in Hobart
Jackson Callow	North Launceston		2022 (Mid-season)	Rookie (#17)	2021-2022	3	0	Raised in Launceston
Rhyan Mansell	Prospect Hawks, North Launceston	U18 (2017)	2020	Pre-season supplemental	2021-	73	50	Raised in Launceston
Tarryn Thomas	North Launceston	U16 (2016), U18 (2016)	2018	#8	2019-2023	57	45	Raised in Launceston
Chayce Jones	Longford, Launceston		2018	#9	2019-	92	23	Born, raised in and recruited from Longford
Hugh Dixon	Kingborough	U18 (2017)	2017	#44	2018-2022	11	5	Raised and recruited from Hobart
Brody Mihocek	Burnie Dockers	U18 (2011)	2018 (Rookie)	Rookie (#22)	2018-	101	164	Born in Tasmania and raised in Burnie
Hugh Greenwood	-	U16 (2007)	2015 (Rookie)	Rookie (#48)	2017-2024	121	52	Born and raised in Hobart
Robbie Fox	Burnie Dockers		2017 (Rookie)	Rookie (#34)	2017-2025	105	15	Raised in Burnie
Mitchell Hibberd	Clarence				2016-2020	9	0	Raised in Hobart
Mackenzie Willis	Kingborough				2016-2018	5	0	Raised in Hobart
Kieran Lovell	Kingborough	U18 (2015)			2016-2018	2	0	Raised in Hobart
Jake Kolodjashnij	Prospect Hawks, Launceston	U16 (2011), U18 (2012, 2013)			2015-	153	3	Born, raised in and recruited from Launceston
Lachie Weller	Burnie Dockers				2015-	118	42	Raised in Burnie
Paddy McCartin	-				2015-2023	63	35	Born in Hobart
Ryan Gardner	Burnie Dockers				2015-	35	2	Born and raised in Smithton
Ben Brown	Devonport, Glenorchy				2014–2024	174	359	Raised in Devonport
Toby Nankervis	Lilydale, North Launceston	U18 (2013)			2014–	121	34	Raised in George Town
Alex Pearce	Ulverstone, Devonport				2014–	80	3	Born and raised in Ulverstone, recruited from Devonport. (Palawa)
Brady Grey	Burnie Dockers				2014–2018	21	11	Raised in and recruited from Burnie
Kade Kolodjashnij	Prospect Hawks, Launceston	U16 (2011), U18 (2012, 2013)			2014-2020	80	14	Born, raised in and recruited from Launceston
Jackson Thurlow	Launceston				2013–2020	63	14	Born, raised in and recruited from Launceston
Aaron Hall	Hobart				2012-2023	161	94	Born, raised in and recruited from Hobart
Jimmy Webster	Glenorchy				2012-2025	180	4	Raised in and recruited from Hobart
Andrew Phillips	Lauderdale				2012-2023	82	28	Raised in and recruited from Hobart
Jeremy Howe	Dodges Ferry, Lauderdale, Hobart				2012-	228	96	Raised in and recruited from Hobart
Tim Mohr	Launceston				2012-2019	48	1	Born, raised in and recruited from Launceston
Henry Schade	North Hobart, Tassie Mariners	U18 (2011)			2012-2017	28	1	Raised in and recruited from Hobart
Maverick Weller	Burnie Dockers				2011-2019	123	59	Born and raised in Burnie
Josh Green	Sorrell, Clarence	U18 (2020c)			2011-2018	105	135	Born, raised and recruited from Hobart
Daniel Archer	Clarence				2011-2013	1	0	Raised and recruited from Hobart
Ian Callinan	Rokeby, Lauderdale, Clarence	U18 (2000)			2011-2013	32	49	Raised and recruited from Hobart
Levi Casboult	-				2010-	193	213	Born in Hobart
Jesse Lonergan	Launceston				2010-2021	128	32	Raised and recruited from Launceston
Ryan Harwood	Glenorchy, Tassie Mariners	U18 (2009)			2010-2017	81	6	Raised and recruited from Hobart
Brodie Moles	Glenorchy, Tasmanian Devils				2010-2011	17	10	Raised in and recruited from Hobart
Mitch Robinson	Tasmanian Devils				2009-	246	129	Born, raised and recruited
Liam Jones	North Hobart				2009-2021	177	84	Raised and recruited
Nathan Grima	South Launceston, Tassie Mariners, Tasmanian Devils				2009-2016	88	1	Raised in and recruited from Launceston
Aaron Cornelius	Tasmanian Devils				2009-2013	25	35	Raised and recruited
Aaron Joseph	Glenorchy, Tassie Mariners	U18 (2007)			2009-2013	73	10	Raised in and recruited from Hobart
Tom Bellchambers	Tasmanian Devils				2008-2020	136	77	Born and raised in Launceston, recruited
Tom Collier	Tassie Mariners	U18 (2006)			2008-2011	27	4	Raised
Jack Riewoldt	Tassie Mariners, Clarence	U18 (2006)			2007-2023	347	787	Born, raised in and recruited from Hobart
Ricky Petterd	-				2007-2015	84	72	Born in Hobart
Colin Garland	North Hobart, Tassie Mariners				2007-2017	141	16	Raised in and recruited from Hobart
Angus Graham	Tassie Mariners				2007-2014	48	18	Born on King Island
Tom Hislop	Tassie Mariners				2007-2011	27	12	Born and raised in Burnie
Mitch Thorp	North Launceston, Tassie Mariners				2007-2009	2	1	Raised in and recruited from Launceston
Grant Birchall	Tassie Mariners				2006-2021	287	36	Born and raised in Devonport
Sam Iles	Tassie Mariners				2006-2012	33	11	Raised
Sam Lonergan	Launceston, Tassie Mariners, Tasmanian Devils	U18 (2005)			2006-2013	81	39	Born and raised in and recruited from Launceston
Andrew Lee	Burnie Dockers, Tassie Mariners, Tasmanian Devils				2005-2008	5	2	Born in Brighton, raised in and recruited from Burnie
Cameron Thurley	Clarence, Tasmanian Devils				2005-2006	12	12	Raised in and recruited from Hobart
Jason Laycock	East Devonport, Tassie Mariners				2004-2010	58	36	Born, raised in and recruited from Devonport
Luke Shackleton	Burnie Dockers, Tassie Mariners				2004	1	0	Raised in Burnie
Barry Brooks	Grassy, Tassie Mariners				2002-2007	10	3	Born, raised in and recruited from King Island
Ken Hall	North Hobart, Tassie Mariners				2002-2003	1	0	Raised in and recruited from Hobart
Brad Miller	-				2002-2012	157	120	Raised in Hobart
Nick Riewoldt	-				2001-2017	336	718	Born and raised in Hobart
Simon Wiggins	Glenorchy, Tassie Mariners				2001-2009	116	36	Raised in and recruited from Hobart
Peter Street	Glenorchy, Tassie Mariners				2001-2008	78	16	Raised in and recruited from Hobart
Andrew Hill	Tassie Mariners				2001	1	0	Raised
Danny Roach	Tassie Mariners				2001	1	0	Born and raised
Brad Green	Tassie Mariners				2000-2012	254	350	Born in Georgetown and raised in Launceston
Patrick Wiggins	Tassie Mariners				2000-2004	12	5	Raised in and recruited from Hobart
Tim Hazell	Southern Districts				2000-2003	5	3	Raised in and recruited from Hobart
Brady Rawlings	Tassie Mariners				1999-2011	245	62	Born and raised in Devonport
Brodie Holland	Tassie Mariners				1998–2008	155	141	Born and raised in and recruited from Hobart
Justin Plapp	Burnie Dockers, Tassie Mariners				1998-2002	44	30	Born in Penguin, raised and recruited from Burnie
Leigh Brockman	Tassie Mariners				1998, 2002	12	1	Raised
Mark Harwood	Tassie Mariners				1998-2001	30	19	Raised
Justin Wood	Glenorchy, Tassie Mariners				1998	7	5	Born and raised in and recruited from Hobart
Russell Robertson	Tassie Mariners				1997–2009	228	428	Raised in Penguin and Burnie
Gerrard Bennett	North Hobart, Tassie Mariners				1997–2002	32	11	Raised in and recruited from Hobart
Ben Beams	Glenorchy, Tassie Mariners				1997–2001	23	17	Born in Launceston, raised and recruited from Hobart
Jade Rawlings	Devonport				1996-2006	148	96	Born and raised in Devonport
Ben Harrison	Devonport				1995–2005	161	71	Raised in Devonport
Trent Bartlett	Deloraine				1995–2002	81	42	Raised in and recruited from Deloraine
James Cook	North Hobart				1994–2000	77	139	Raised in Hobart
Matthew Richardson	Devonport	1993			1993–2009	282	800	Born, raised in and recruited from Devonport
David Neitz	-				1993–2008	306	631	Born in Ulverstone
Daryn Cresswell	Glenorchy, North Hobart				1992-2003	244	208	Raised in and recruited from Hobart
Jamie Shanahan	Hobart	1991, 1993			1992-1999	162	0	Raised in and recruited from Hobart
Nigel Palfreyman	Sandy Bay	1993			1992-1994	16	7	Raised in and recruited from Hobart
Paul Atkins	Wynyard				1992	2	0	Raised in and recruited from Wynyard
Paul Williams	North Hobart	1993			1991-2006	306	307	Raised in and recruited from Hobart
Danny Noonan	Clarence				1991-1993	55	19	Lived in Hobart
Matthew Mansfield	Glenorchy	1990, 1993			1991-1993	32	5	Raised in and recruited from Hobart
Brad Davis	Burnie Hawks				1991-1993	5	1	Raised in and recruited from Burnie
David Noble	North Hobart				1991	2	0	Raised in and recruited from Hobart
Paul Hudson	Hobart	1990, 1991, 1993			1990-2002	245	479	Raised in and recruited from Hobart
Brendon Gale	Burnie Hawks	1990, 1991, 1993			1990-2001	244	209	Raised in and recruited from Burnie
Chris Bond	North Hobart	1991, 1993			1990-1999	163	45	Born and raised in Wynyard, Tasmania, recruited from Hobart
Dion Scott	Devonport	1993			1990-1999	79	61	Born and raised in Ulverstone, recruited from Devonport
Jody Arnol	North Hobart				1990-1991	13	6	Raised in and recruited from Hobart
Adrian Fletcher	Glenorchy	1991, 1993			1989-2001	231	97	Raised and recruited from Hobart
Colin Alexander	Clarence	1990, 1991			1989-1993	29	30	Recruited from Hobart
Alastair Lynch	Wynyard, Hobart	1988, 1990, 1991, 1993			1988-2004	306	633	Born and raised in Burnie, recruited from Hobart
Graham Wright	East Devonport	1990, 1993			1988-1998	201	107	Raised in and recruited from Devonport
Trent Nichols	Sandy Bay	1990, 1991, 1993			1988-1998	112	107	Raised in and recruited from Hobart
Bradley Plain	Clarence	1988, 1993			1988-1996	56	96	Raised in and recruited from Hobart
John Klug	Glenorchy				1991-1992	26	34	Raised in and recruited from Hobart
Darren Davies	Launceston, North Hobart	1990			1988-1991	39	39	Raised in Launceston, recruited from Hobart
Shane Fell	Glenorchy	1990			1990	15	30	Lived in Hobart
Michael Parsons	Launceston	1988			1988-1990	25	14	Raised in Legana and Launceston
Justin Stubbs	Devonport	1980, 1988			1988-1990	3	5	Raised in and recruited from Devonport
Steven Febey	Devonport	1993			1987-2001	258	40	Raised in and recruited from Devonport
Matthew Febey	Devonport, Rochester	1993			1987-2000	143	44	Raised in and recruited from Devonport
Darrin Pritchard	Sandy Bay	1988, 1990, 1991, 1993			1987-1997	211	94	Born, raised in and recruited from Hobart
Simon Atkins	Wynyard	1988, 1990, 1991, 1993			1987-1996	168	89	Raised in and recruited from Wynyard
Matthew Armstrong	Hobart	1988, 1993			1987-1994	175	89	Raised in and recruited from Hobart
Brett Stephens	North Hobart	1990			1987-1993	133	52	Lived in Hobart
Simon Minton-Connell	North Hobart	1988, 1991			1986-1998	112	305	Raised in and recruited from Hobart
John McCarthy	North Hobart	1988, 1990, 1991, 1993			1986-1996	163	178	Raised in and recruited from Hobart
Ben Buckley	Smithton	1993			1986-1993	74	15	Raised in and recruited from Smithton
James Manson	North Hobart	1988, 1990, 1991, 1993			1985-1995	167	126	Raised in and recruited from Devonport
Michael Gale	Marist Regional College, Penguin	1988, 1990, 1991, 1993			1985-1993	196	49	Raised in and recruited from Penguin
David Grant	South Launceston	1988, 1991			1984-1996	198	75	Raised in and recruited from Launceston
Doug Barwick	East Launceston	1988, 1990, 1991, 1993			1984-1991	147	218	Raised in and recruited from Launceston
Rod MacPherson	Clarence				1982-1986	50	27	Raised in and recruited from Hobart
Stephen MacPherson	Clarence	1990, 1991, 1993			1982-1995	188	152	Raised in and recruited from Hobart
Bruce Abernethy					1982-1992	112	39	Born in Ouse
Stephen Nichols	Sandy Bay	1988			1982-1983	7	6	Raised in and recruited from Hobart
Scott Clayton	Hobart	1988, 1990			1981-1990	160	23	Raised in and recruited from Hobart
Scott Wade	Hobart	1980			1981-1983	12	4	Raised in and recruited from Hobart
Robert Dutton	Launceston				1981-1982	2	0	Raised in and recruited from Launceston
Steve Goulding	North Launceston	1979, 1988			1981	2	2	Raised in and recruited from Launceston
Colin Robertson	Wynyard	1979, 1980, 1988			1980-1986	116	62	Raised in and recruited from Wynyard
Stephen Carey	North Launceston	1979, 1980			1980-1986	112	6	Raised in and recruited from Launceston
Shane Williams	North Hobart	1979, 1988			1979-1988	61	30	Raised in and recruited from Hobart
Stephen Mount	Sandy Bay	1979			1979-1982	31	9	Raised in and recruited from Hobart
Tony Martyn	Sandy Bay	1979			1979-1981	32	5	Raised in and recruited from Hobart
Graham Hunnibell	North Launceston	1979			1978-1980	12	2	Raised in and recruited from Launceston
Michael Roach	Longford	1979, 1980, 1988			1977-1989	200	607	Born, raised in and recruited from Longford
Chris Stone	-				1978-1981	23	12	Raised in Sandy Bay, Hobart
Michael Conlan	-				1977-1989	210	395	Born
Kerry Good	Ulverstone	1979, 1980			1977-1983	74	150	Raised in and recruited from Ulverstone
Michael Young	Clarence	1979			1977-1983	52	15	Raised in and recruited from Hobart
Mark Williams	Penguin	1980			1977-1979	9	1	Raised in and recruited from Penguin
Rodney Eade	Glenorchy	1979, 1980, 1988			1976-1990	259	49	Born, raised in and recruited from Hobart
Ian Paton	Scotch College, Launceston	1988			1976-1990	155	47	Raised in and recruited from Launceston
Peter Hamilton	Ulverstone	1979, 1980			1976-1983	52	1	Raised in and recruited from Ulverstone
Denis Scanlon	North Hobart	1975, 1980			1976-1981	66	7	Raised in and recruited from Hobart
Ian Marsh	North Launceston	1979, 1980			1976-1980	68	16	Raised in and recruited from Launceston
Tony Pickett	North Launceston	1979			1976-1979	60	32	Raised in and recruited from Launceston
Robert Neal	Wynyard	1979, 1988			1974-1988	220	52	Raised in and recruited from Wynyard
Greg Towns	Cooee	1979			1974-1982	89	30	Raised in and recruited from Cooee
Robert Shaw	Sandy Bay	1979, 1980			1974-1981	51	8	Born, raised in and recruited from Hobart
Craig Davis	Launceston	1979, 1980			1973-1988	163	360	Born and raised in Ross, Tasmania, recruited from Launceston
Phil Manassa	Devonport	1980			1973-1979	122	60	Lived in Devonport
Noel Carter	Ulverstone	1979, 1980			1973-1977	50	55	Raised in and recruited from Ulverstone
John Anthony	East Devonport				1972	3	-	Recruited
Grant Allford	Latrobe				1971-1973	30	1	Recruited
Darryl Sutton	Glenorchy	1979			1970-1986	249	385	Born, raised and recruited from Hobart
Barry Lawrence	Longford				1969–1976	126	80	Raised and recruited from Longford
Ray Biffin	North Launceston				1968–1979	170	131	Born and raised in Launceston and recruited from Campbell Town
Brent Crosswell	Campbell Town				1968–1982	222	257	Born and raised in Launceston and recruited from Campbell Town
John Greening	Cooee				1968–1976	107	70	Born, raised and recruited from Burnie
Derek Peardon	King Meadows High School				1968–1971	20	1	Born on Cape Barren Island, raised and recruited from Launceston. (Palawa)
Peter Hudson	New Norfolk District	19 caps (1979)			1967–1977	129	727	Born, raised and recruited from New Norfolk
Royce Hart	Clarence				1967–1977	187	369	Born and raised Whiteford and recruited from Hobart
Peter Jones	North Hobart	1979			1966-1979	249	284	Born, raised in and recruited from Hobart
John Bingley	East Devonport				1965-1966	8	1	Raised in and recruited from Devonport
Bruce Armstrong	Scottsdale				1965-1966	7	0	Raised in and recruited from Scottsdale
Gary Arnold	Rosebery				1963-1964	13	7	Raised in and recruited from Rosebery
Ian Stewart	North Hobart, Hobart				1962–1971	205	80	Born in Queenstown, raised and recruited from Hobart
Darrel Baldock	East Devonport, Latrobe	15 caps			1962–1968	119	237	Born, raised and recruited from Devonport
Tassie Johnson	North Launceston				1959–1969	202	20	Raised and recruited from Launceston
Roy Apted	North Launceston	1958, 1966			1959–1963	44	1	Born, raised and recruited from Launceston
Maurie Sankeyl	Latrobe				1959–1965	100	61	Born in Tasmania, raised in Latrobe
John Heathcote	Ulverstone				1958–1962	69	70	Raised in Ulverstone
Berkley Coxl	City-South				1958–1965	102	45	Raised in and recruited from Launceston
Verdun Howell	City-South				1958–1968	159	59	Born, raised in and recruited from Launceston
Athol Webb	Scottsdale				1955–1959	74	146	Raised in and recruited from Scottsdale
Dale Anderson	Latrobe				1953-1954	7	15	Born
John Chick	New Town				1952-1960	119	29	Born in Tasmania, raised in Hobart
Allan Miller	-				1948–1951	36	48	Born in Hobart
Arthur Hodgson	Queenstown				1948–1952	76	7	Raised in and recruited from Queenstown
Ray Stokes	Burnie				1946-1951	93	23	Born in Longford, raised in and recruited from Burnie
Ted Collis	North Hobart				1946	9	12	Born and raised in Hobart
Geoff Barwick	New Norfolk District				1945	19	14	Born and raised in Hobart
Tom Calder	North Hobart				1945	5	0	Raised in Hobart
Terry Cashion	Buckingham, New Town				1942	5	5	Raised in and recruited from Hobart
Lance Collins	-	1947 c			1942-1945	33	78	Lived in Hobart for a time
Gordon Abbott	Lefroy				1937-1947	133	70	Born, raised, recruited
Bill Cahill	Launceston				1937-1938	15	0	Bornin Hobart. Raised in and recruited from Launceston
Len Pye	North Hobart	1933			1934-1935	16	39	Born and raised in New Norfolk and recruited from Hobart
Laurie Nash	City				1933-1945	99	246	Lived in and recruited from Launceston
Eric Huxtable	New Town				1930-1942	157	5	Born and raised in Hobart
Patt Hartnett	North Launceston				1930-1937	66	58	Born and raised in St Helens and recruited from Launceston
Clyde Beattie	North Hobart				1930	5	2	Born in Oatlands, raised in and recruited from Hobart
Alan Scott	North Launceston				1929-1930	32	26	Born in Ringarooma, raised in and recruited from Launceston
Doug Ringrose	-				1928-1929	35	30	Born and raised in Hobart
Charlie Barnes	Latrobe				1927-1929	33	0	Raised in Latrobe
Jack Cashman	-				1926-1936	93	125	Born in Zeehan
Col Deane	New Town	1924			1925-1934	85	53	Born and raised in Launceston and Hobart
Fred Pringle	Cananore				1923-1924	22	7	Raised in and recruited from Hobart
Fred Brown	-				1922-1926	41	7	Born and raised in Hobart
Ivor Warne-Smith	Latrobe				1919-1932	146	110	Lived in Latrobe
Bert Davie	Latrobe				1917-1919	27	1	Born and raised in Hobart
Claude Bryan	Cananore	1911			1914-1920	22	1	Born, raised in and recruited from Hobart
Percy Jory	North Hobart	1911			1912-1920	60	15	Raised in and recruited from Hobart
George Challis	Launceston	1911			1912-1915	70	16	Born in Cleveland, raised in and recruited from Launceston
Stanley McKenzie	Launceston	1911			1914	14	6	Born, raised in and recruited from Launceston
Ted McDonald	Launceston				1912-1919	48	2	Born, raised in and recruited from Launceston
Viv Valentine	Launceston	1908			1911-1918	116	91	Born, raised in and recruited from Launceston
Jim Tumilty					1910	2	1	Born in Launceston
Fred Anderson					1908	1	-	Born and raised in Launceston
Bert Atkins	-				1907-1919	39	1	Born in Hobart
George Morrissey	North Hobart	1911			1907-1909	93	64	Lived in Hobart
Albert Pannam	Wynyard	1908			1907-1909	1	-	Born in Beaconsfield, raised in and recruited from Wynyard
Vic Belcher	-				1907-1920	226	62	Born in Launceston
Jack Dawson	-				1907	13	0	Born in Hobart
Wal Smallhorn	-				1905-1906	4	0	Born in Hobart
Allan Belcher	-				1904-1919	180	41	Born in New Norfolk
Ernie Ashton	-				1904	1	0	Born in Campbell Town
Vic Barwick	Queenstown				1903-1913	105	66	Born in Oatlands, raised in and recruited from Queenswtown
Joe Littler	Launceston	1908			1903	10	9	Born, raised in and recruited from Launceston
Harvey Kelly	-	1911			1902-1914	92	127	Lived in Hobart
Jack Gardiner	-	1908, 1911 (c)			1901-1908	86	59	Lived in Hobart
George McLeod	Launceston	1908			1897-1913	68	6	Lived in Mount Lyell
Dick Gibson	-	1908			1897-1898	29	9	Lived there
Horrie Stewart	Launceston				1898	1	-	Born in Westbury
George Vautin	City				1897-1898	26	1	Born in Orielton, raised in Hobart
Tod Collins	-				1897-1903	98	27	Born in Hobart
Fred McGinis	-				1897-1901	84	36	Born in Hobart
Bill Casey	Southern Tasmania				1897-1900	61	2	Born in Richmond
George Moysey	-				1897-1899	35	25	Born in Hobart (Battery Point)
Colin Campbell	North-Eastern Tasmania				1897-1899	12	4	Born in Cressy
George Williamson	Tasmania	1887			1897-1898	12	0	Born and raised in Launceston
Lew Massey	-				1897	8	1	Born in Woodbridge

=== Women's ===
==== Current Players ====
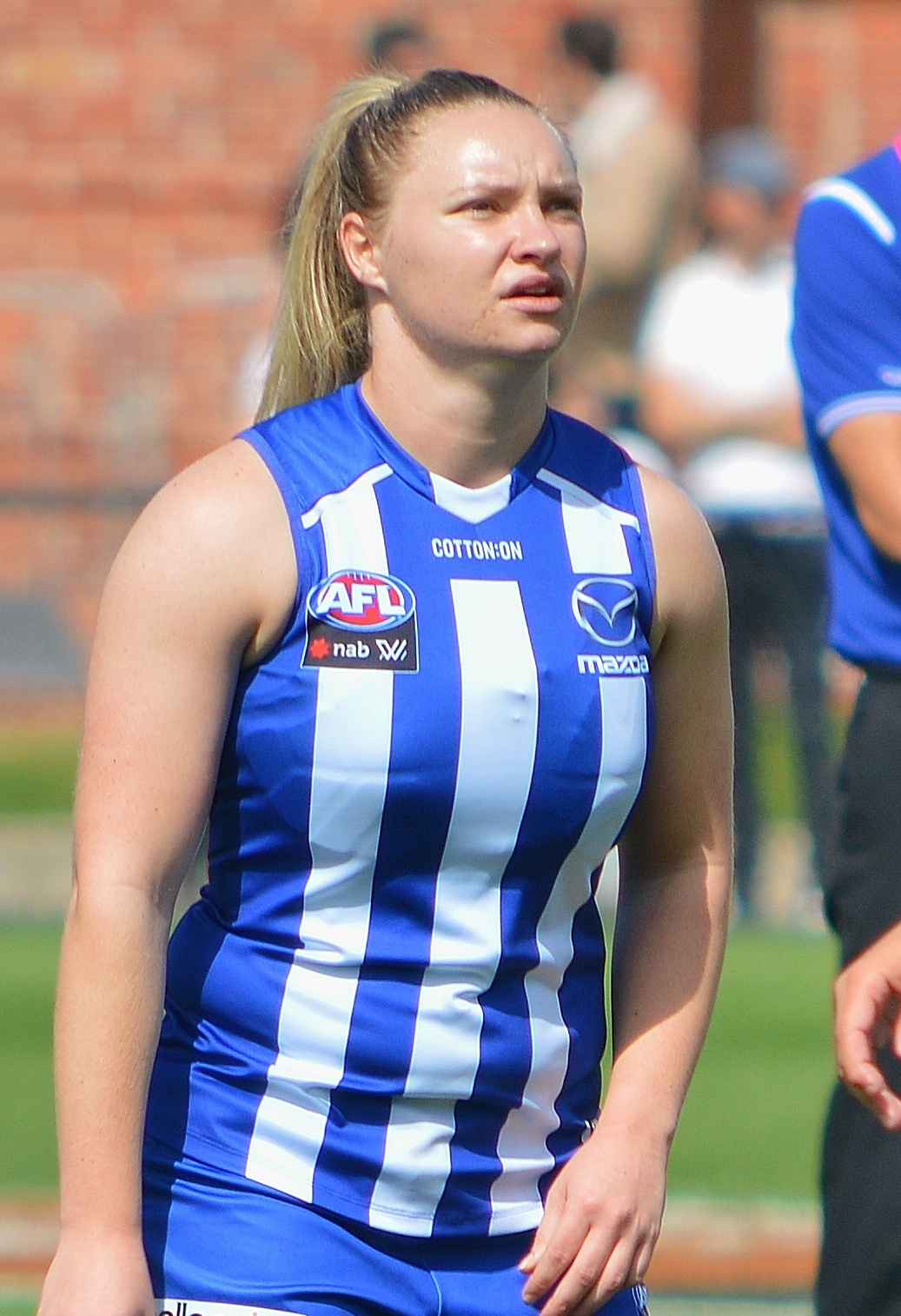
Daria Bannister is from Launceston

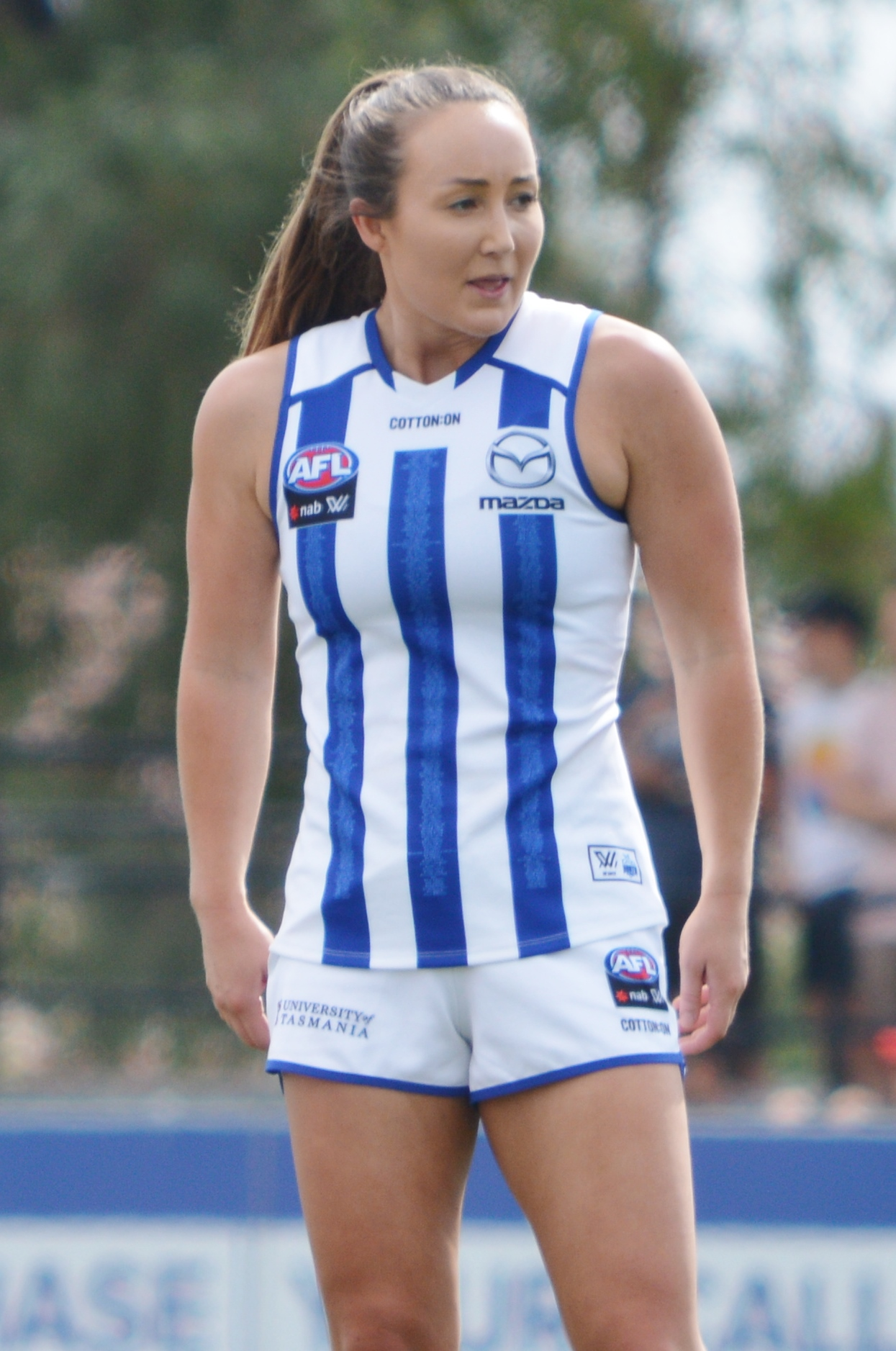
Nicole Bresnehan is from Hobart

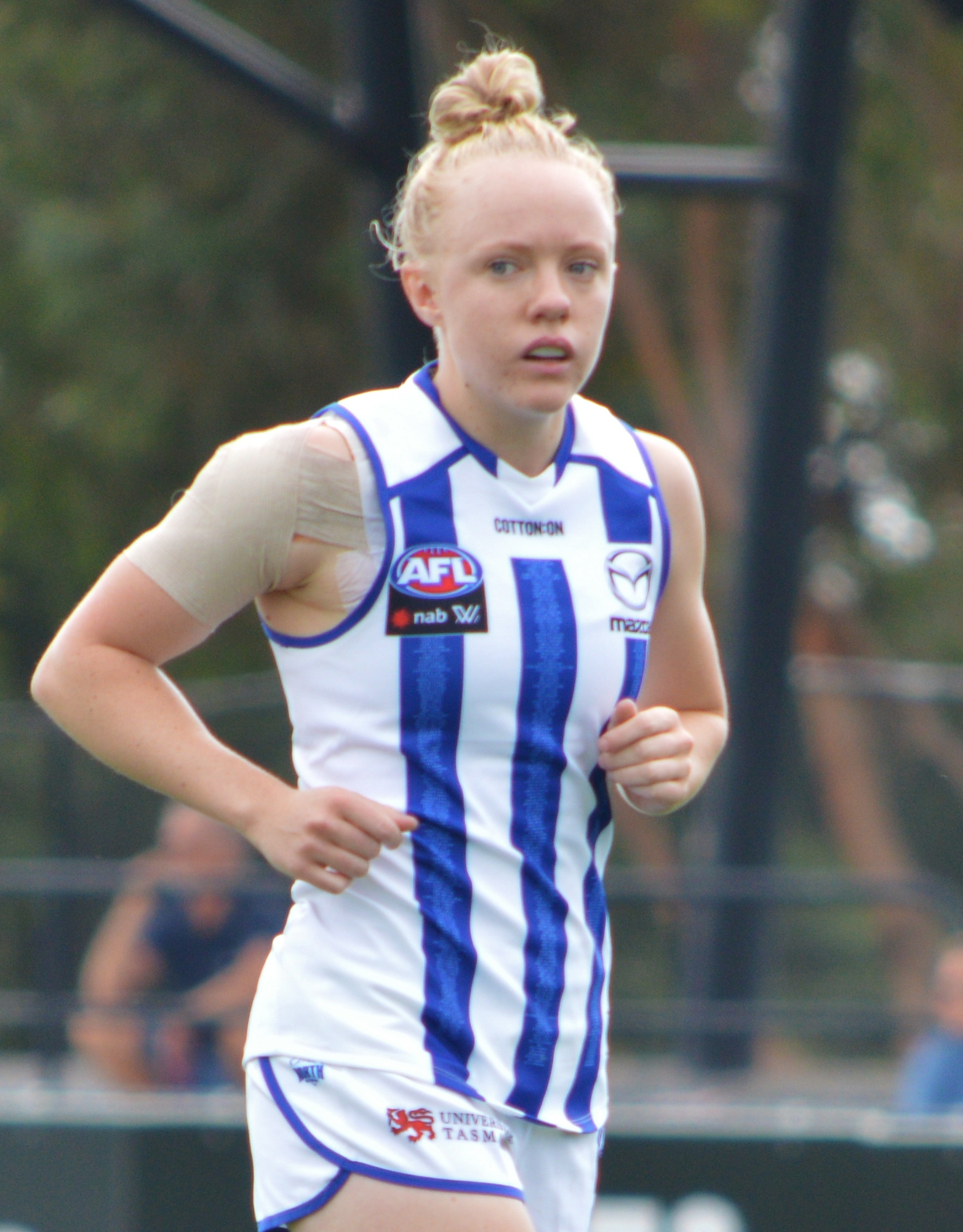
Emma Humphries is from Burnie

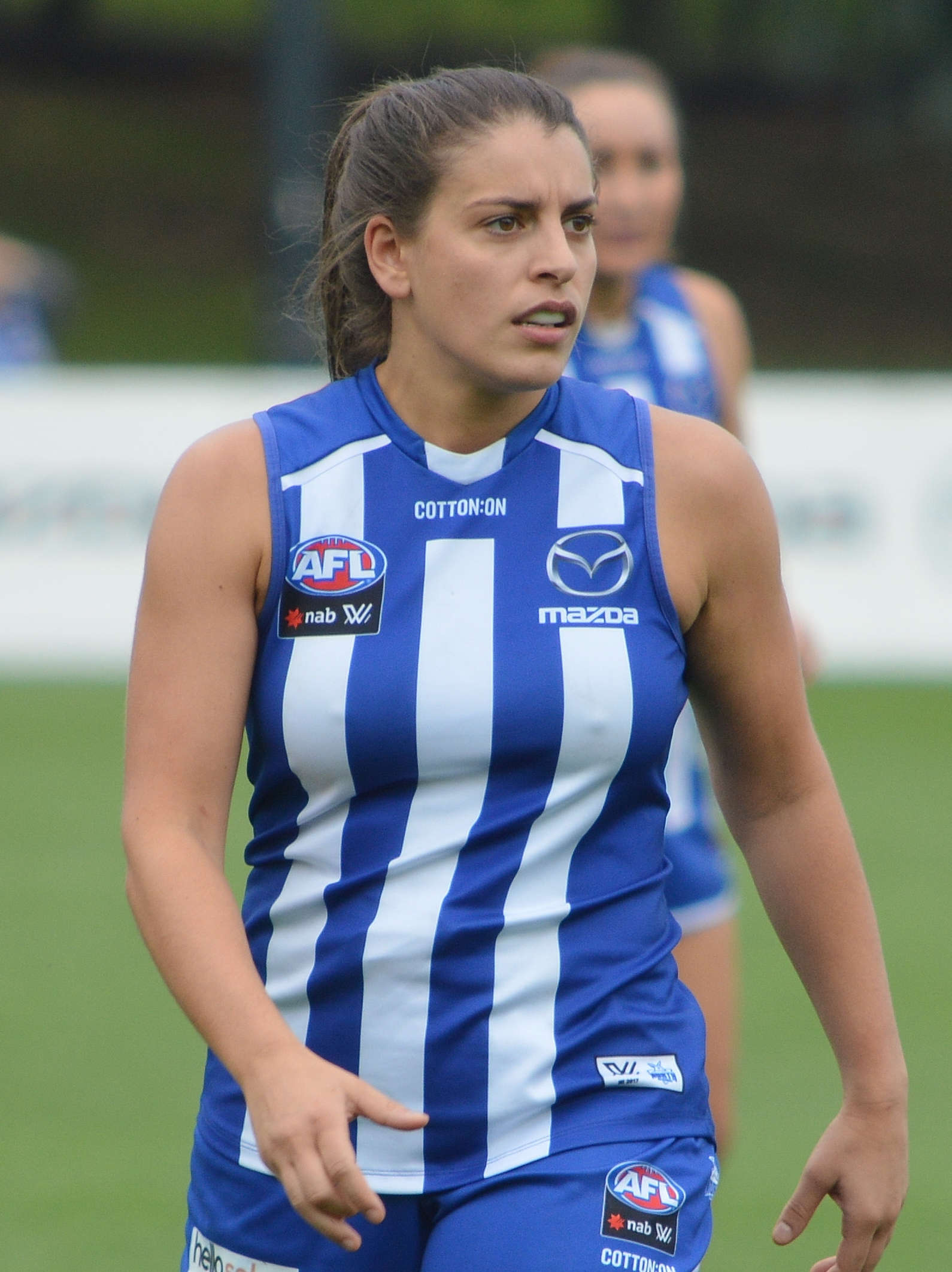
Ellie Gavalas is from Hobart

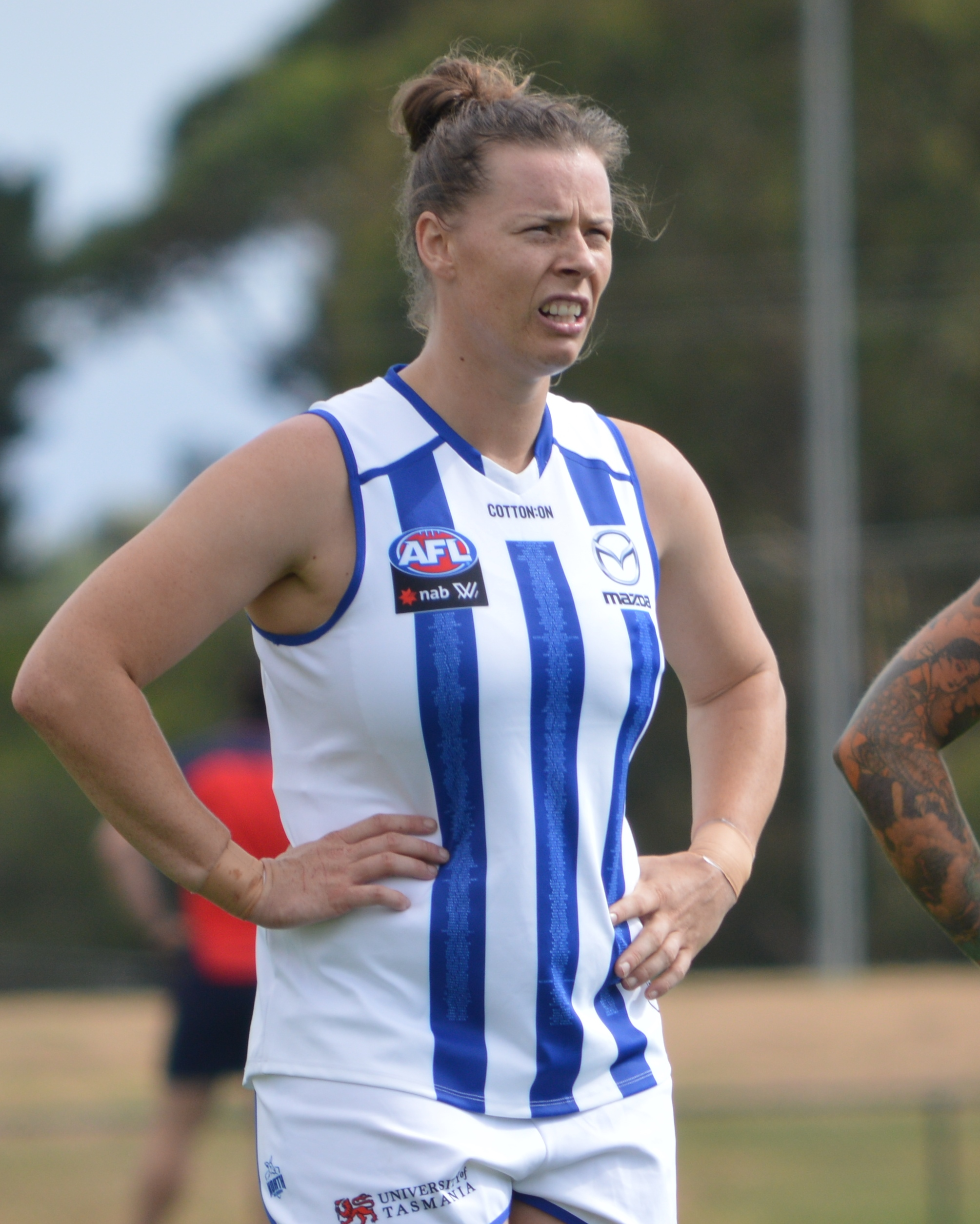
Brittany Gibson is from Burnie

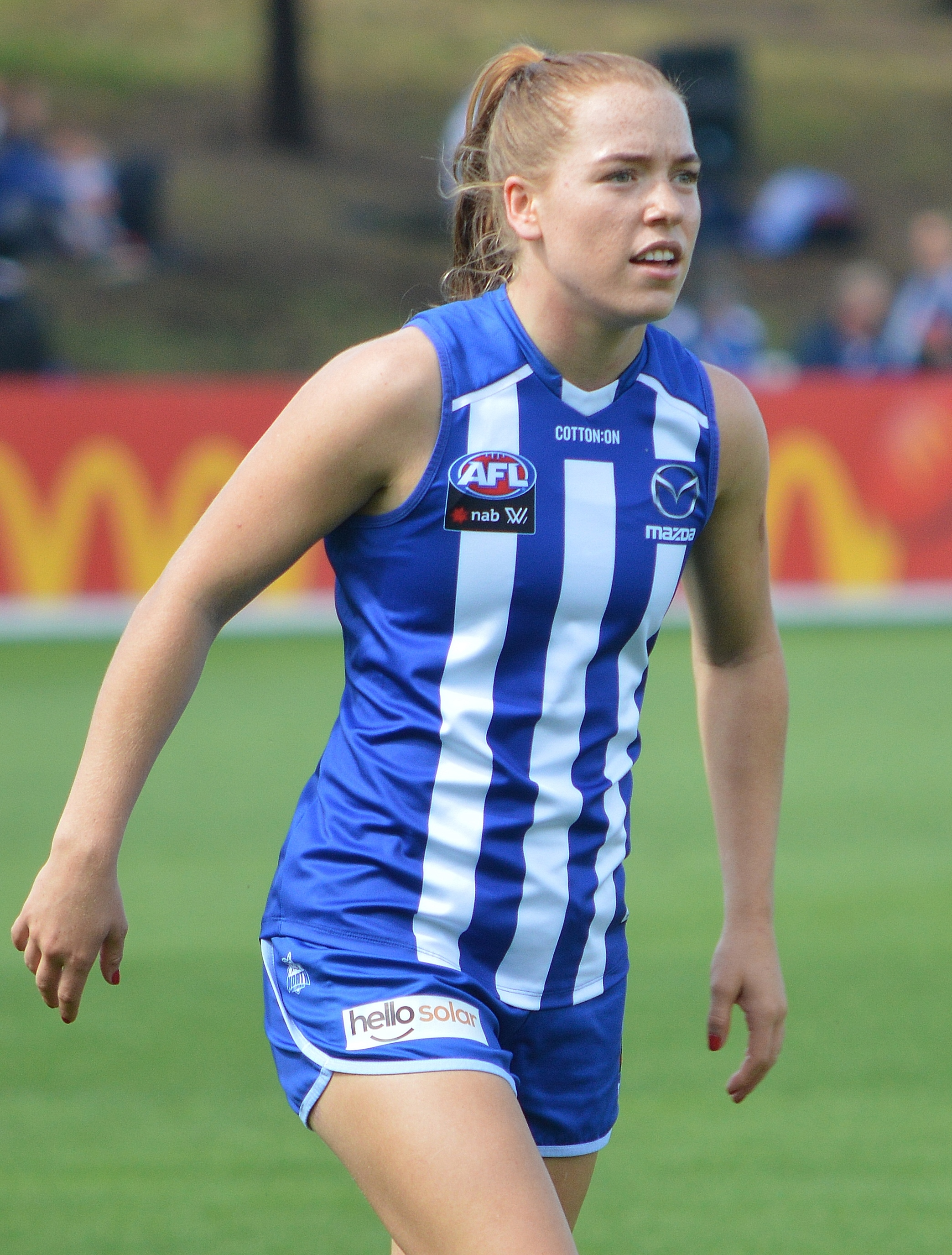
Mia King is from Launceston

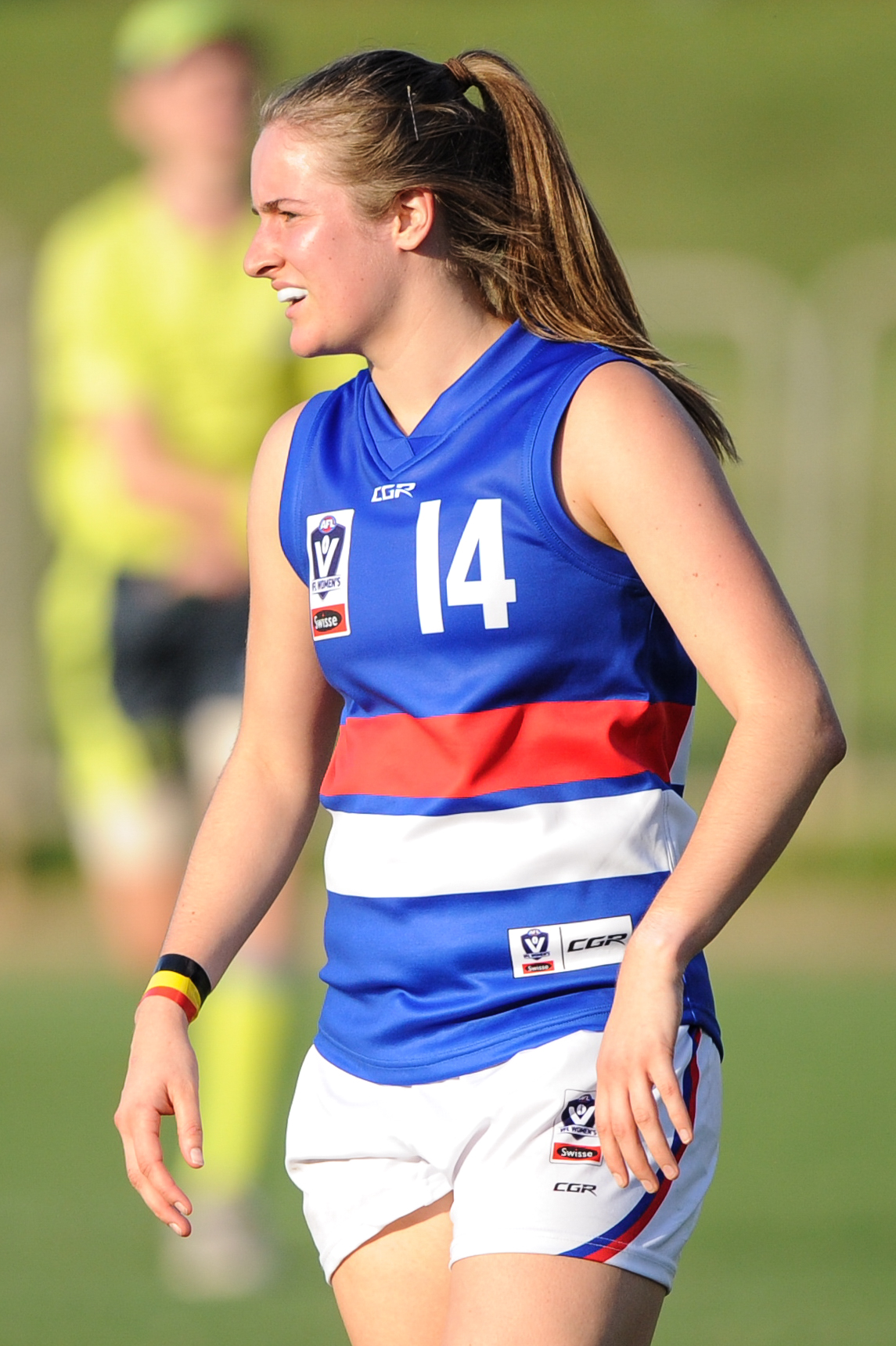
Ellyse Gamble is from Burnie

==== AFLW players from Tasmania ====
Currently on an AFLW senior list

Player	TAS junior/senior club/s	Representative honours	AFLW Draft	Selection	AFLW Years	AFLW Games	AFLW (Goals)	Connections to Tasmania, Notes & References
Mackenzie Ford	Kingborough Tigers Junior, Kermandie, North Hobart, Cygnet, Southern Storm, Tasmania Devils (U18)		2023	#43	2024-	1	0	Raised in Dover
Tunisha Kikoak	North Launceston, Tasmania Devils (U18)				2024-	2	0	Raised in Launceston
Georgia Clark	Tasmania Devils (U18)		2023	#8	2024-	4	1	Raised in Hobart
Brooke Barwick	Glenorchy, Claremont, Tasmania Devils (U18)		2023	#4	2024-	2	0	Raised in Hobart
Elise Barwick	North Hobart				2023-	5	-	Raised in Hobart
Meagan Kiely	Launceston, Burnie Dockers		2021	#48	2022-2023	19	4	Born in Tasmania, raised in Burnie and Launceston
Ella Maurer	North Launceston, Old Scotch Collegians, Tasmania Devils (U18)				2022-	5	-	Raised in Launceston
Meghan Gaffney	Ulverstone, Tasmania Devils (U18)		2022	#66	2022-	8	0	Raised in Ulverstone
Lily Johnson	Latrobe, Devonport				2022-	5	2	Raised in Latrobe
Madison Brazendale	Launceston, Tasmania Devils (U18)				2022-	13	1	Raised in Launceston
Brooke Brown	Ulverstone, Launceston				2022-	32	1	Raised in Ulverstone and Launceston
Claire Ransom	North Hobart	U18			2022-	2	0	Raised in Hobart
Ellie Gavalas	-		2019	#10	2020-	41	13	Raised in Tasmania
Mia King	Launceston		2019	#49	2020-	49	5	Raised in and recruited from Launceston
Chloe Haines	Burnie Dockers	U18 (2018)	2018	#55	2019-2020	1	0	Raised in Wynyard, Tasmania and recruited from Burnie
Nicole Bresnehan	Clarence		2018	#63	2019-	49	0	Raised in and recruited from Hobart
Daria Bannister	Launceston		2017	#19	2018-	40	25	Raised in and recruited from Launceston
Jess Wuetschner	Clarence		2016	#34	2017-	55	42	Born and raised in Hobart
Brittany Gibson	Burnie Dockers		2016	#141	2017-2022	30	8	Born in Tasmania and raised in and recruited from Burnie
Ellyse Gamble	Burnie Dockers		2016	#69	2017-	41	1	Raised in and recruited from Burnie
Emma Humphries	Burnie Dockers		2016	#57	2017-	26	3	Raised in and recruited from Burnie

== See also ==
- Australian rules football in Tasmania
