= 1979 Perth State of Origin Carnival =

Australian football competition

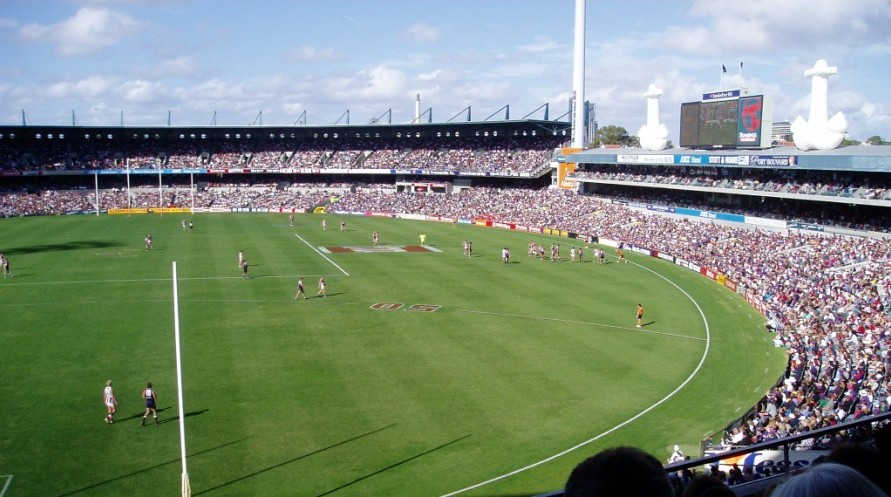
- Subiaco Oval where all Section One matches were played

Tournament information
- Sport: Australian football
- Location: Perth, Australia
- Dates: 4 October 1979–8 October 1979
- Format: Knockout
- Teams: 5

Final champion
- SECTION A: Western Australia; SECTION B: Queensland

The 1979 Perth State of Origin Carnival was the 20th Australian National Football Carnival, an Australian football competition. It was the first carnival to take place under the State of Origin format.

All of the Section One finals were played on Subiaco Oval, in October. Western Australia won the final, defeating Victoria. WA's captain, Brian Peake won the Tassie Medal as the tournament's best player.

== Results ==
=== Section One ===
Game	Winning team	Winning team score	Losing team	Losing team score	Ground	Crowd	Date
Qualification Play Off	Tasmania	17.20 (122)	Queensland	13.12 (90)	Perth Oval	-	4 October 1979
Semi Final 1	Western Australia	23.23 (161)	Tasmania	9.10 (64)	Subiaco Oval	-	6 October 1979
Semi Final 2	Victoria	25.30 (180)	South Australia	20.15 (135)	Subiaco Oval	15,186	6 October 1979
3rd Place Playoff	South Australia	22.20 (152)	Tasmania	17.11 (113)	Subiaco Oval	-	8 October 1979
Final	Western Australia	17.21 (123)	Victoria	16.12 (108)	Subiaco Oval	30,876	8 October 1979

=== Section Two ===
The ACT, coached by Kevin Delmenico, had only two players with VFL experience in their team - captain Kevin Neale and Fitzroy's Michael Conlan. Their only match was against Warren Roper's Queensland, who had failed to qualify for Section One. The Australian Capital Territorians themselves had qualified for the Section Two Final by winning a play-off against the Australian Amateurs, New South Wales and Northern Territory earlier in the year.

Round	Winning team	Winning team score	Losing team	Losing team score	Ground	Crowd	Date
Final	Queensland	23.13 (151)	ACT	18.12 (120)	Leederville Oval	-	7 October 1979

==== Section Two Qualifying ====
Round	Winning team	Winning team score	Losing team	Losing team score	Ground	Crowd	Date
Qualifying Semi-Final	Australian Amateurs	27.17 (179)	Northern Territory	13.15 (93)	VFL Park	-	28 July 1979
Qualifying Semi-Final	Australian Capital Territory	22.12 (144)	New South Wales	19.21 (135)	Manuka Oval	-	29 July 1979
Qualifying Final	Australian Capital Territory	16.21 (117)	Australian Amateurs	16.15 (111)	Manuka Oval	-	5 August 1979

== Squads ==
=== Section One ===
South Australia

Coach: Neil Kerley
Captain/s: Rick Davies
Vice Captain/s:
Deputy Vice Captain/s:

- Rick Davies (Sturt)
- Andy Bennett (South Adelaide)
- Malcolm Blight (Woodville)
- Neil Button (Norwood)
- Peter Carey (Glenelg)
- Graham Cornes (Glenelg)/(North Melbourne)
- Russell Ebert (North Melbourne)
- Eddie Fry (Sturt)
- Phil Gallagher (Norwood)
- Michael Graham (Sturt)
- Glynn Hewitt (Woodville)
- Kym Hodgeman (Glenelg)
- Max James (South Melbourne)
- Peter Jonas (Central District)/(North Melbourne)
- Dexter Kennedy (West Adelaide)
- Robbert Klomp (Carlton)
- Jim Lihou (Glenelg)
- Bruce Lindsay (West Torrens)
- Peter Meuret (West Adelaide)
- Geoff Morris (West Adelaide)
- Mick Nunan (Sturt)
- Greg Phillips (Port Adelaide)
- Trevor Sorrell (Port Adelaide)
- Michael Taylor (Norwood)
- Mark Williams (Port Adelaide)
Tasmania

Coach: Barry Lawrence
Captain/s: Peter Hudson
Vice Captain/s:
Deputy Vice Captain/s:

- Peter Hudson (Hawthorn)
- Stephen Carey (North Launceston)
- Noel Carter (Richmond)
- Craig Davis (North Melbourne)
- Rodney Eade (Hawthorn)
- Kerry Good (North Melbourne)
- Steve Goulding (North Launceston)
- Peter Hamilton (Ulverstone)
- Graham Hunnibell (North Launceston)
- Michael Hunnibell (New Norfolk)
- Des James (Sandy Bay)
- Peter Jones (North Hobart)
- Tom Lee (Cooee)
- Ian Marsh (North Launceston)
- Tony Martyn (Sandy Bay)
- Stephen Mount (Sandy Bay)
- Robert Neal (Wynyard)
- Tony Pickett (North Launceston)
- Michael Roach (Longford)
- Colin Robertson (Wynyard)
- Robert Shaw (Sandy Bay)
- Darryl Sutton (North Melbourne)
- Greg Towns (Footscray)
- Shane Williams (Richmond)
- Michael Young (Carlton)
Victoria

Coach: David Parkin
Captain/s: Wayne Schimmelbusch
Vice Captain/s:
Deputy Vice Captain/s:

- Wayne Schimmelbusch (North Melbourne)
- Graeme Allan (Fitzroy)
- Kevin Bartlett (Richmond)
- Barry Breen (St Kilda)
- David Clarke (Geelong)
- David Cloke (Richmond)
- Max Crow (Essendon)
- Gary Dempsey (North Melbourne)
- Bruce Doull (Carlton)
- Ian Dunstan (Footscray)
- Robert Flower (Melbourne)
- Garry Foulds (Essendon)
- Wayne Harmes (Carlton)
- Warwick Irwin (Fitzroy)
- Kelvin Moore (Hawthorn)
- Peter Moore (Collingwood)
- Bruce Nankervis (Geelong)
- William Picken (Collingwood)
- Geoff Raines (Richmond)
- Barry Round (South Melbourne)
- Geoff Southby (Carlton)
- Kelvin Templeton (Footscray)
- Michael Tuck (Hawthorn)
- Michael Turner (Geelong)
- Garry Wilson (Fitzroy)
Western Australia

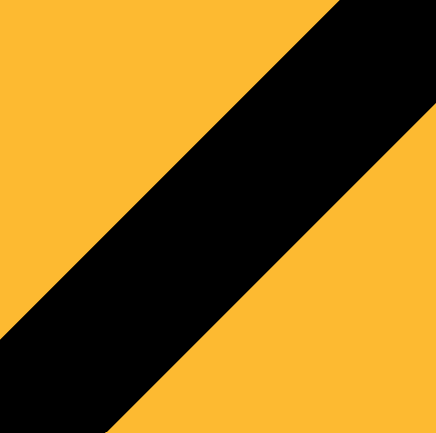

Coach: Barry Cable
Captain/s: Brian Peake
Vice Captain/s:
Deputy Vice Captain/s:

- Brian Peake (East Fremantle)
- Ron Alexander (Fitzroy)
- Bob Beecroft (Fitzroy)
- Peter Bosustow (Perth)
- Kevin Bryant (North Melbourne)
- Tony Buhagiar (East Fremantle)
- Peter Featherby (Subiaco)
- Mike Fitzpatrick (Carlton)
- Ken Hunter (Claremont)
- Phil Kelly (East Perth)
- Stan Magro (collingwood)
- Gary Malarkey (Geelong)
- Graham Melrose (North Melbourne)
- Stephen Michael (South Fremantle)
- Ian Miller (Fitzroy)
- Bruce Monteath (Richmond)
- Graham Moss (Claremont)
- Keith Narkle (Swan Districts)
- Brian Peake (East Fremantle)
- Maurice Rioli (South Fremantle)
- Jim Sewell (East Fremantle)
- Garry Sidebottom (St Kilda)
- Peter Spencer (East Perth)

=== Section Two ===
Queensland

Coach: Warren Roper
Captain/s: Barry Clarke
Vice Captain/s:
Deputy Vice Captain/s:

- Barry Clarke (Wilston Grange)
- Wayne Banfield
- Mal Gillespie (Western Districts)
- Peter Ives (Mayne)
- Kevin Crilly
- Warren Jones (Morningside)
- Barry Karklis (Wilston Grange)
- J Petty
- Richie Rushbrook (Wilston Grange)
- John Stackpoole (Sandgate)
- T Staff
- H Thompson
- Don Blackford (Morningside)
- Dale Woodhall (Mayne)
- Dale Frost
- Syd Guildford (Wilston Grange)
- Greg Melit (Mayne)
- Zane Taylor (Southport)
- Peter Taylor (Western Districts)
- Frank Dunell (Wilston Grange)
- Owen Backwell (Wilston Grange)
- Nev Weller
- R Murrie
- Gary Madison
- P Ellis
- Robert Green (Doctor)
ACT

Coach: Kevin Delmenico
Captain/s: Kevin Neale
Vice Captain/s:
Deputy Vice Captain/s:

- Kevin Neale (Ainslie)
- Bob Anderson (Queanbeyan)
- Peter Ash (Eastlake)
- David Bennett (Belconnen)
- Jim Black (Queanbeyan)
- Edney Blackaby (Manuka)
- Neil Bristow (Ainslie)
- John Brock (Ainslie)
- Mick Conlan (Manuka)
- Ron Davey (Ainslie)
- Lindsay Fawns
- Tony Flaherty
- Robert Franklin (Manuka)
- Graham
- David Harriss (Manuka)
- Geoff Harrold (Bentleigh-McKinnon)
- Peter Kenny (Manuka)
- Robert Maiden (Manuka)
- John Manson (Belconnen)
- Malcolm Manson (Belconnen)
- John Miller (Ainslie)
- Keith Miller (Eastlake)
- Laurie Moloney (Belconnen)
- Bill Quade (Belconnen)
- John Rafferty (Ainslie)
- Jimmy Richardson (Eastlake)
- Peter Searle (Ainslie)
- Robert Smith (Ainslie)
- Mark Stewart
- Greg Whittle (Belconnen)
- Stan Widera (Belconnen)
Amateurs

Coach: Peter O'Donohue Captain/s: Ian Cordner
Vice Captain/s: Ross Haslam
Deputy Vice Captain/s:

- Ian Cordner (Old Melburnians)
- Ross Haslam (Port Adelaide)
- Noel Annear (Adelaide Uni.)
- Bruce Bourne (Ormond)
- Bryan Chute
- Simon Costello (Melbourne Uni.)
- Joe Doolan
- Will Hamilton
- John Houghton
- Chris Hunter
- Glenn Hurst
- Pat McCann
- Richard O'Shannassy
- Bill Parousis
- Richard Pisarski
- Joe Pittorino
- Fiji Skorzewski
- Michael Sleeman
- Jim Smith
- David Steinepreis
- Greg Wade
- Greg Wright
- Ian Harrison
- Frank Marchesani (Marcellin College)
New South Wales

Coach: Allan Jeans
Captain/s:
Vice Captain/s:
Deputy Vice Captain/s:

- Michael Browne
- Greg Carroll (The Rock)
- Wayne Carroll (Ganmain)
- John Chamberlain (The Rock)
- Gary Colvin
- Evan Connick
- John Durnan (Narrandera)
- John Gannon (Leeton)
- Richard Hamilton (The Rock)
- Ian Harry (Carlton)
- Victor Hugo (Narrandera)
- R. Imrie
- Mark Newton
- Barry Nolan (Ganmain)
- Ray O'Connor (GGGM)
- Gerald Peiper
- Laurie Pendrick (North Wagga Wagga)
- Jim Prentice (Ariah Park)
- Brian Quade (East Wagga Wagga)
- Harry Skreja (Leeton)
- Greg Smith (Ardlethan)
- Bruce Stewart (Lockhart)
Northern Territory

Coach: Bob Elix
Captain/s: Tony Dragun
Vice Captain/s:
Deputy Vice Captain/s:

- Tony Dragun (Nightcliff)
- Grant Boucher (Palmerston)
- Robbie Cooper (Darwin)
- Joe Daby (Nightcliff)
- Billy Ellis (Wanderers)
- John Green (St Mary's)
- Hans Heystraten (St Mary's)
- Peter Lauritsen (St Mary's)
- Dennis Lew-Fatt (Waratah)
- Peter March (St Mary's)
- Keith Nickels (Waratah)
- Alan Oates (Nightcliff)
- John Patterson (Darwin)
- John Pepperill (St Mary's)
- Greg Peris (Nightcliff)
- Ian Smith (Palmerston)
- Leslie Turner (Alice Springs)
- John Tye (Darwin)
- Gus Wanganeen (Wanderers)
- Lance White (Pioneer)

== Honours ==
=== All-Australians ===
At the conclusion of the tournament, the best players were selected in the All-Australian team. It was the first All-Australian team named since 1972. Victoria had the most representatives chosen, with seven, with Western Australia and South Australia each having five players selected.

1979 All-Australian team
B:	Des James (Sandy Bay, Tas)	Gary Malarkey (Geelong, WA)	Kelvin Moore (Hawthorn, Vic)
HB:	Bruce Doull (Carlton, Vic)	Darryl Sutton (North Melbourne, Tas)	Ken Hunter (Claremont, WA)
C:	Michael Turner (Geelong, Vic)	Brian Peake (East Fremantle, WA) (captain)	Geoff Morris (West Adelaide, SA)
HF:	Peter Jonas (Central District, SA)	David Cloke (Richmond, Vic)	Graham Cornes (Glenelg, SA)
F:	Peter Carey (Glenelg, SA)	Michael Roach (Richmond, Tas)	Tony Buhagiar (East Fremantle, WA)
Foll:	Peter Moore (Collingwood, Vic)	Michael Tuck (Hawthorn, Vic)	Garry Wilson (Fitzroy, Vic) (vice-captain)
Int:	Kym Hodgeman (Glenelg, SA )	Bruce Monteath (Richmond, WA)	
Coach:	Barry Cable (Western Australia		

=== Leading goal-kickers ===
- Michael Roach (TAS) - 9 goals
- Richard Rushbrook (QLD) - 8 goals
- Tony Buhagiar (WA) - 7 goals
- Barry Clarke (QLD) - 7 goals
- Peter Hudson (TAS) - 7 goals
- Peter Spencer (WA) - 7 goals
- Garry Wilson (VIC) - 7 goals

=== Tassie Medalist ===
1. Brian Peake (WA) - 11 votes
2. Bruce Monteath (WA) - 7 votes
3. Robert Flower (Vic) - 6 votes
4. Kym Hodgeman (SA) - 5 votes
5. Ken Hunter (WA) - 4 votes
6. Bruce Lindsay (SA) - 3 votes
7. David Cloke (Vic) - 2 votes
8. Geoff Raines (Vic) - 2 votes
9. Kevin Bartlett (Vic) - 2 votes
10. Michael Roach (Tas) - 2 votes
11. Peter Jonas (SA) - 1 vote
12. Graham Cornes (SA) - 1 vote
13. Darryl Sutton (Vic) - 1 vote
14. Robert Shaw (Tas) - 1 vote
