= 1985 TANFL season =

Australian rules football season

- Teams: Clarence Kangaroos; Glenorchy Magpies; Hobart Tigers; New Norfolk Eagles; North Hobart Demons; Sandy Bay Seagulls
- Premiers: Glenorchy
- Minor premiers: Clarence; 5th minor premiership

Attendance
- Matches played: 64
- Total attendance: 132,461 (2,070 per match)

The 1985 Tasmanian Australian National Football League (TANFL) premiership season was an Australian rules football competition staged in Hobart, Tasmania over twenty roster rounds and four finals series matches between 30 March and 21 September 1985.

The League was known as the Winfield League under a commercial naming-rights sponsorship agreement with Winfield tobacco company and was to be the final season of the original TANFL (as it had been known since 1928) with the competition switching from a regional to statewide format from 1986.

The TANFL was also the governing body of the sport within Tasmania and it was liquidated in January 1986 to form the TFL Statewide League.

== Participating Clubs ==
- Clarence District Football Club
- Glenorchy District Football Club
- Hobart Football Club
- New Norfolk District Football Club
- North Hobart Football Club
- Sandy Bay Football Club

=== 1985 TANFL Club Coaches ===
- Robert Shaw (Clarence)
- Danny Ling (Glenorchy)
- Scott Wade (Hobart)
- Graham Hunnibell (New Norfolk)
- Darryl Sutton (North Hobart)
- Tim Maxwell (Sandy Bay)

=== Midas Mufflers League (Reserves) Grand Final ===
- Sandy Bay 30.22 (202) v Glenorchy 12.8 (80) – North Hobart Oval

=== Dux Hotwater Systems League (Under-19's) Grand Final ===
- Clarence 17.18 (120) v Sandy Bay 7.8 (50) – North Hobart Oval

=== Leading Goalkickers: TANFL ===
- Wayne Fox (New Norfolk) – 130
- Scott Adams (Clarence) – 91
- Cary Millhouse (Hobart) – 82
- David Pearce (Glenorchy) – 71

=== Medal Winners ===
- Graham Hunnibell (New Norfolk) – William Leitch Medal
- Tony Kline (North Hobart) – George Watt Medal (Reserves)
- Sam Synott (Sandy Bay) – V.A Geard Medal (Under-19's)
- Jason Taylor (New Norfolk) – D.R Plaister Medal (Under-17's)

=== Interstate Matches ===
Foster's NFL Shield (Saturday, 4 May 1985)

- Tasmania 22.11 (143) v New South Wales 19.14 (128) – Att: 5,185 at North Hobart Oval

Foster's NFL Shield (Saturday, 25 May 1985)

- Tasmania 24.16 (160) v ACT 16.16 (112) – Att: 4,348 at North Hobart Oval

Foster's NFL Shield (Saturday, 30 June 1985)

- Queensland 23.17 (155) v Tasmania 9.5 (59) – Att: 8,243 at Windsor Park, Brisbane

=== Intrastate Match ===
Interstate Match (Sunday, 9 June 1985)

- NWFU 1.3 (9) | 4.7 (31) | 5.9 (39) | 13.12 (90)
- TANFL 4.4 (28) | 4.5 (29) | 6.10 (46) | 6.12 (48)
  Attendance: 4,500 at West Park Oval

== 1985 TANFL Ladder ==
Pos	Team	Pld	W	L	D	PF	PA	PP	Pts
1	Clarence	20	17	3	0	2539	1794	141.5	68
2	Glenorchy	20	14	6	0	2636	1901	138.7	56
3	New Norfolk	20	13	7	0	2367	2055	115.2	52
4	North Hobart	20	8	12	0	2134	2463	86.6	32
5	Sandy Bay	20	6	14	0	2135	2645	80.7	24
6	Hobart	20	2	18	0	1916	2859	67.0	8

== Roster season ==
=== Round 1 ===
(Saturday, 30 March 1985)

- Nth Hobart 24.12 (156) v Hobart 10.10 (70) – Att: 1,873 at North Hobart Oval
- Clarence 17.19 (121) v Sandy Bay 13.20 (98) – Att: 1,901 at Queenborough Oval
- Glenorchy 23.16 (154) v New Norfolk 11.11 (77) – Att: 1,901 at KGV Football Park

=== Round 2 ===
(Saturday, 6 April & Monday, 8 April 1985)

- Sandy Bay 20.23 (143) v Hobart 19.17 (131) – Att: 1,480 at KGV Football Park
- New Norfolk 14.12 (96) v Nth Hobart 11.16 (82) – Att: 1,724 at Boyer Oval
- Clarence 19.14 (128) v Glenorchy 10.23 (83) – Att: 3,868 at North Hobart Oval (Monday)

=== Round 3 ===
(Saturday, 13 April 1985)

- Nth Hobart 19.18 (132) v Sandy Bay 17.10 (112) – Att: 2,054 at North Hobart Oval
- Glenorchy 30.13 (193) v Hobart 12.11 (83) – Att: 1,631 at KGV Football Park
- Clarence 22.9 (141) v New Norfolk 16.16 (112) – Att: 2,010 at Bellerive Oval

=== Round 4 ===
(Saturday, 20 April 1985)

- Glenorchy 16.25 (121) v Nth Hobart 11.10 (76) – Att: 2,573 at North Hobart Oval
- Clarence 18.13 (121) v Hobart 8.11 (59) – Att: 1,104 at KGV Football Park
- Sandy Bay 17.10 (112) v New Norfolk 13.11 (89) – Att: 1,116 at Boyer Oval

=== Round 5 ===
(Saturday, 27 April & Sunday, 28 April 1985)

- New Norfolk 26.14 (170) v Hobart 7.9 (51) – Att: 1,347 at North Hobart Oval
- Clarence 23.16 (154) v Nth Hobart 21.3 (129) – Att: 2,331 at Bellerive Oval
- Glenorchy 33.20 (218) v Sandy Bay 10.9 (69) – Att: 2,709 at KGV Football Park (Sunday)

=== Round 6 ===
(Saturday, 11 May 1985)

- New Norfolk 18.18 (126) v Glenorchy 10.18 (78) – Att: 1,545 at North Hobart Oval
- Hobart 20.12 (132) v Nth Hobart 14.13 (97) – Att: 818 at KGV Football Park
- Clarence 14.13 (97) v Sandy Bay 10.9 (69) – Att: 1,440 at Bellerive Oval

=== Round 7 ===
(Saturday, 18 May 1985)

- New Norfolk 26.13 (169) v Nth Hobart 12.12 (84) – Att: 1,793 at North Hobart Oval
- Sandy Bay 19.12 (126) v Hobart 15.10 (100) – Att: 1,219 at Queenborough Oval
- Clarence 14.17 (101) v Glenorchy 13.15 (93) – Att: 2,585 at KGV Football Park

=== Round 8 ===
(Saturday, 1 June 1985)

- Nth Hobart 26.14 (170) v Sandy Bay 22.10 (142) – Att: 1,607 at North Hobart Oval
- Glenorchy 16.18 (114) v Hobart 12.9 (81) – Att: 1,355 at KGV Football Park
- New Norfolk 24.10 (154) v Clarence 11.11 (77) – Att: 1,986 at Boyer Oval

=== Round 9 ===
(Saturday, 8 June 1985)

- New Norfolk 15.10 (100) v Sandy Bay 14.15 (99) – Att: 1,279 at North Hobart Oval
- Nth Hobart 26.13 (169) v Glenorchy 15.13 (103) – Att: 1,757 at KGV Football Park
- Clarence 23.21 (159) v Hobart 16.11 (107) – Att: 1,301 at Bellerive Oval

=== Round 10 ===
(Saturday, 15 June 1985)

- Clarence 19.16 (130) v Nth Hobart 10.4 (64) – Att: 2,124 at North Hobart Oval
- Glenorchy 25.18 (168) v Sandy Bay 8.9 (57) – Att: 1,189 at Queenborough Oval
- New Norfolk 21.13 (139) v Hobart 19.21 (135) – Att: 1,007 at KGV Football Park

=== Round 11 ===
(Saturday, 22 June 1985)

- Clarence 14.16 (100) v Sandy Bay 5.10 (40) – Att: 1,266 at North Hobart Oval
- Nth Hobart 12.16 (88) v Hobart 11.10 (76) – Att: 968 at KGV Football Park
- Glenorchy 14.12 (96) v New Norfolk 13.10 (88) – Att: 1,594 at Boyer Oval

=== Round 12 ===
(Saturday, 29 June 1985)

- Glenorchy 19.14 (128) v Nth Hobart 12.13 (85) – Att: 1,976 at North Hobart Oval
- Clarence 25.20 (170) v Hobart 11.13 (79) – Att: 1,066 at KGV Football Park
- New Norfolk 19.17 (131) v Sandy Bay 15.10 (100) – Att: 1,065 at Boyer Oval

=== Round 13 ===
(Saturday, 6 July 1985)

- Sandy Bay 22.16 (148) v Nth Hobart 18.11 (119) – Att: 1,172 at Queenborough Oval
- Glenorchy 21.21 (147) v Hobart 14.16 (100) – Att: 1,215 at KGV Football Park
- Clarence 13.18 (96) v New Norfolk 11.9 (75) – Att: 1,966 at Bellerive Oval

=== Round 14 ===
(Saturday, 13 July 1985)

- New Norfolk 15.7 (97) v Nth Hobart 10.12 (72) – Att: 1,358 at North Hobart Oval
- Hobart 17.17 (119) v Sandy Bay 13.10 (88) – Att: 865 at KGV Football Park
- Glenorchy 15.8 (98) v Clarence 9.13 (67) – Att: 2,639 at Bellerive Oval

=== Round 15 ===
(Saturday, 20 July 1985)

- Clarence 18.10 (118) v Nth Hobart 12.15 (87) – Att: 1,861 at North Hobart Oval
- Glenorchy 27.15 (177) v Sandy Bay 11.10 (76) – Att: 1,328 at KGV Football Park
- New Norfolk 27.21 (183) v Hobart 10.13 (73) – Att: 965 at Boyer Oval

=== Round 16 ===
(Saturday, 27 July 1985)

- Nth Hobart 24.15 (159) v Hobart 19.8 (122) – Att: 1,120 at North Hobart Oval
- Glenorchy 29.17 (191) v New Norfolk 14.5 (89) – Att: 2,136 at KGV Football Park
- Clarence 18.13 (121) v Sandy Bay 17.12 (114) – Att: 1,359 at Bellerive Oval

=== Round 17 ===
(Saturday, 3 August 1985)

- Sandy Bay 22.14 (146) v Hobart 20.14 (134) – Att: 899 at North Hobart Oval
- Clarence 24.8 (152) v Glenorchy 10.13 (73) – Att: 2,858 at KGV Football Park
- New Norfolk 18.8 (116) v Nth Hobart 10.10 (70) – Att: 1,090 at Boyer Oval *

Note: Wayne Fox (New Norfolk) kicks his 100th goal for the season.

=== Round 18 ===
(Saturday, 10 August 1985)

- Nth Hobart 24.18 (162) v Sandy Bay 21.15 (141) – Att: 1,758 at North Hobart Oval
- Glenorchy 23.22 (160) v Hobart 10.11 (71) – Att: 1,086 at KGV Football Park
- New Norfolk 17.14 (116) v Clarence 17.11 (113) – Att: 1,557 at Boyer Oval

=== Round 19 ===
(Saturday, 17 August 1985)

- Sandy Bay 18.24 (132) v New Norfolk 14.10 (94) – Att: 1,086 at Queenborough Oval
- Nth Hobart 12.11 (83) v Glenorchy 11.12 (78) – Att: 1,844 at KGV Football Park
- Clarence 24.20 (164) v Hobart 14.10 (94) – Att: 1,097 at Bellerive Oval

=== Round 20 ===
(Saturday, 24 August 1985)

- Glenorchy 24.18 (162) v Sandy Bay 17.21 (123) – Att: 1,547 at North Hobart Oval
- New Norfolk 21.10 (136) v Hobart 15.9 (99) – Att: 952 at KGV Football Park
- Clarence 30.29 (209) v Nth Hobart 7.8 (50) – Att: 1,939 at Bellerive Oval

== Finals Series ==
=== First Semi Final ===
(Saturday, 31 August 1985)

- Nth Hobart: 10.5 (65) | 13.8 (86) | 18.13 (121) | 24.15 (159)
- New Norfolk: 7.1 (43) | 9.4 (58) | 15.8 (98) | 18.13 (121)
- Attendance: 5,345 at North Hobart Oval

=== Second Semi Final ===
(Saturday, 7 September 1985)

- Glenorchy: 5.6 (36) | 8.14 (62) | 12.14 (86) | 20.17 (137)
- Clarence: 4.2 (26) | 7.9 (51) | 11.14 (80) | 14.18 (102)
- Attendance: 6,567 at North Hobart Oval

=== Preliminary Final ===
(Saturday, 14 September 1985)

- Clarence: 3.4 (22) | 9.7 (61) | 14.8 (92) | 21.11 (137)
- Nth Hobart: 1.3 (9) | 7.8 (50) | 13.11 (89) | 17.13 (115)
- Attendance: 7,729 at North Hobart Oval

=== Grand Final ===
(Saturday, 21 September 1985)

- Glenorchy: 2.5 (17) | 3.10 (28) | 6.13 (49) | 10.15 (75)
- Clarence: 3.3 (21) | 4.6 (30) | 5.8 (38) | 10.11 (71)
- Attendance: 16,561 at North Hobart Oval
