= Peter Jonas (footballer) =

Australian rules footballer

Personal information
- Born: 20 October 1959 (age 67); Saddleworth, South Australia
- Original team: Central District (SANFL)
- Height: 184 cm (6 ft 0 in)
- Weight: 83 kg (183 lb)

Playing career^{1}
Years	Club	Games (Goals)
1981–1988	North Melbourne	82 (115)

Coaching career
Years	Club	Games (W–L–D)
1998–2000	Central District	64 (36–28–0)
- ^{1} Playing statistics correct to the end of 1988.

Peter Jonas (born 20 October 1959) is a former Australian rules footballer who played with Central Districts in the SANFL and North Melbourne in the Victorian Football League (VFL) during the 1980s.

Jonas, a forward, was only 17 when he made his debut in the Central District seniors in 1977. He won his club's best and fairest in 1979 and represented South Australia in the Perth State of Origin Carnival that year. For his performances at the carnival he was selected as an All-Australian and in doing so became the first ever Central District player to have made the team.

In 1981 he made his debut for North Melbourne and despite remaining with the club until 1988 would only play 82 games in that period due to injury. Twice he broke his leg and at various times he also broke an arm, hand and injured his collar bone. Mostly playing at half forward, he had a full season in 1985 which saw him kick his best season tally at North Melbourne of 31 goals.

He finished his career back at Central District and retired during the 1988 season to finish with 93 games and 109 goals in the SANFL.

Appointed coach of Central District in 1998, Jonas steered the club to their inaugural premiership in his third season. He later became an assistant coach at AFL clubs St Kilda and Sydney.
