= Des James =

Australian rules footballer (1952–2024)

Des James (1952 – 27 June 2024) was an Australian rules footballer who played for Sandy Bay in the Tasmanian Football League (TFL).

James, a back pocket, is noted his performances at the 1979 Perth State of Origin Carnival, which earned him a spot in the All-Australian team.

An Indigenous player, he was inducted into the Tasmanian Football Hall of Fame in 2005. His older brother Glenn James was an umpire in the Victorian Football League. Des James died on 27 June 2024.
