= Gary Malarkey =

Australian rules footballer

Personal information
- Full name: Gary Robert Malarkey
- Born: 23 May 1953 (age 73); Armadale, Western Australia
- Original team: Trinity College, Perth
- Height: 185 cm (6 ft 1 in)
- Weight: 89 kg (196 lb)
- Position: Full back

Playing career^{1}
Years	Club	Games (Goals)
1971–1976	East Perth	101 (29)
1977–1986	Geelong	172 (0)
1987–1988	Geelong West	

Representative team honours
Years	Team	Games (Goals)
1973–1983	Western Australia	8 (0)
1979–1981	Victoria	2 (0)
- ^{1} Playing statistics correct to the end of 1988.

Career highlights
- East Perth WAFL premiership 1972; East Perth fairest and best 1973; All-Australian 1979 (State of Origin carnival); VFL Team of the Year 1983; Geelong FC life member (awarded 1983); WAFL Hall of Fame (inducted 2010)

Gary Robert Malarkey (born 23 May 1953) is a former Australian rules footballer, who represented East Perth (WAFL), Geelong (VFL/AFL), Geelong West (VFA), Western Australia, and Victoria.

== East Perth ==
Malarkey was born at Armadale, and was educated at Trinity College. He joined East Perth at the age of 18. Although he debuted on a half forward flank in the second game of 1971, he could only notch 2 senior games that year. Tried in defence the following year, he quickly demonstrated his outstanding potential by appearing in all 23 games and lined up at full back in the Royals 1972 premiership team.

Although not tall for a key defender (185 cm) Malarkey was extremely strong and he showed an early propensity for close checking defence. He had excellent anticipation and good pace as well as being a strong mark and superb kick, often reaching into centre square with his punts from the full back line. In his second full season (1973) Malarkey won East Perth's fairest and best trophy and represented WA against South Australia. He was signed by Geelong but East Perth imposed a minimum service requirement of 100 league games before a clearance would be granted. He thus stayed for a further 3 years before finally crossing to the Cats for the 1977 VFL season.

== Geelong ==
At Geelong, Malarkey was an immediate and outstanding success in his customary full back position and was selected to represent Victoria. In 1983, the Geelong and now AFL historian Col Hutchinson said of Malarkey in his book Cats Tales that he was "one of Geelong's most effective full backs and probably the strongest defender to ever represent the team. His great concentration, solid marking, effective spoiling tactics, courage, pace and superb kicking resulted in nightmares for opposing forwards. Few players have emulated his consistency."

Malarkey was a regular WA state of origin representative whilst at Geelong and gained All-Australian selection after the 1979 State of Origin carnival. He was named in the VFL Team of the Year in 1983 and he was also runner up in Geelong's fairest and best award that season. When he decided, at this point, to return home to Perth to finish his career, Geelong. in a measure of their appreciation, granted him life membership despite his 143 games being 7 games short of the qualifying tally. Unfortunately no agreement could be reached with East Perth, or any other WAFL club and Malarkey returned to Geelong. He quickly forced his way back into the side but a shoulder reconstruction two years later brought an unfortunate end to a long and distinguished senior career. He had played 283 senior games but later had a final playing stint at the Geelong West club in the Victorian Football Association and he was the last coach of that club in 1988.

Gary wore the Cats famous number 5 guernsey previously worn by another legendary Western Australian, Graham "Polly" Farmer, but after Gary's premature retirement during the 1984 pre-season the number 5 had been allocated to Gary Ablett. After a reshuffle of numbers Malarkey was allocated the number 6 guernsey previously worn by Rod Waddell, which he wore until his retirement in 1986.

== After football ==
Gary Malarkey later returned to WA and became a member of the staff at his old school, Trinity College.

In 2010 he was inducted into the WA Football Hall of Fame, and is also a member of Geelong's Hall of Fame.
