= Kevin Delmenico =

Australian rules footballer and coach

Personal information
- Full name: Kevin Delmenico
- Born: 18 May 1945 (age 81)
- Original team: Castlemaine
- Height: 187 cm (6 ft 2 in)
- Weight: 83 kg (183 lb)
- Position: Defender

Playing career^{1}
Years	Club	Games (Goals)
1966–70	Footscray	65 (1)
- ^{1} Playing statistics correct to the end of 1970.

Kevin Delmenico (born 18 May 1945) is a former Australian rules footballer who played for Footscray in the Victorian Football League (VFL) from 1966 to 1970.

== Football career ==
Delmenico played his early football with Castlemaine in the Bendigo Football League, winning the Michelsen Medal for the best and fairest player in the league in 1965. He was recruited by Footscray in 1966, spending five seasons there beside club great Ted Whitten, and playing 65 games. A defender, he kicked the only goal of his career against Geelong his debut season.

Delmenico was captain-coach of Ganmain FC in the South West Football League (New South Wales) in 1971 and 1972. He joined Canberra club Manuka in the ACTAFL in 1973 and played in three successive premierships, the last two as captain-coach. From 1976 to 1980, Delmenico coached Queanbeyan. He coached the ACT at the 1979 Perth State of Origin Carnival.

In 1991 Delmenico was elected unopposed as president of the ACTAFL, succeeding Allan Hird Jr. In 2011 he was inducted into the AFL Canberra Hall of Fame.
