= Ian Marsh (footballer) =

Australian rules footballer (1955–2021)

Personal information
- Full name: Ian J. Marsh
- Born: 23 October 1955
- Died: 28 May 2021 (aged 65)
- Original team: North Launceston
- Height: 178 cm (5 ft 10 in)
- Weight: 75 kg (165 lb)
- Position: Wingman

Playing career^{1}
Years	Club	Games (Goals)
1976–80	Essendon	68 (16)
- ^{1} Playing statistics correct to the end of 1980.

Ian Marsh (23 October 1955 – 28 May 2021) was an Australian rules footballer who played for Essendon in the Victorian Football League (VFL).

After sporadic appearances in his first two seasons, Marsh was a regular on the wing for Essendon from 1978 to 1980. He was unable to play at Essendon in 1981 due to heart problems and had to have open heart surgery in July that year. The following month he returned to training but despite making the reserves he could not break back into the VFL side. Marsh however continued to play district football at Aberfeldie and spent the 1985 season with South Bendigo, his last year before retiring.

Marsh was originally from North Launceston and represented Tasmania at the 1979 Perth State of Origin Carnival.
