= John Durnan =

Australian rules footballer

Personal information
- Full name: John Durnan
- Born: 11 July 1957 (age 69)
- Original team: Narrandera
- Height: 178 cm (5 ft 10 in)
- Weight: 80 kg (176 lb)

Playing career^{1}
Years	Club	Games (Goals)
1979	Geelong	1 (0)
1980 — 1982	St Kilda	21 (2)
Total		22 (2)
- ^{1} Playing statistics correct to the end of 1982.

John Durnan (born 11 July 1957) is a former Australian rules footballer who played for Geelong and St Kilda in the Victorian Football League (VFL).
