= Michael Browne (Australian footballer) =

Australian rules footballer

Personal information
- Full name: Michael Browne
- Born: 26 January 1954
- Died: 7 January 2009 (aged 54)
- Original team: Montmorency
- Height: 194 cm (6 ft 4 in)
- Weight: 85.5 kg (188 lb)

Playing career^{1}
| Years | Club | Games (Goals) |
| 1973–75 | Collingwood | 12 (6) |
- ^{1} Playing statistics correct to the end of 1975.

Michael Browne (26 January 1954 – 7 January 2009) was an Australian rules footballer who played with Collingwood in the Victorian Football League (VFL).
