= Greg Towns =

Australian rules footballer

Personal information
- Full name: Greg Towns
- Born: 10 January 1954 (age 72)
- Original team: Cooee
- Height: 180 cm (5 ft 11 in)
- Weight: 83 kg (183 lb)
- Positions: Centreman, Utility

Playing career^{1}
Years	Club	Games (Goals)
1974–79	Carlton	66 (23)
1980–82	Footscray	23 (7)
Total		89 (30)
- ^{1} Playing statistics correct to the end of 1982.

Greg Towns (born 10 January 1954) is a former Australian rules footballer who played for Carlton and Footscray in the Victorian Football League (VFL).

Towns played a lot in the reserves due to the strength of the Carlton side but still made four VFL finals appearances. After he was not picked in the 1979 finals series, where Carlton became premiers, Towns was cleared to Footscray. A Tasmanian, originally from Cooee, Towns represented his state in the 1979 Perth State of Origin Carnival. Greg Towns would later play with Williamstown in the VFA after he left Footscray.
