= Bill Casey (Australian footballer) =

Australian rules footballer (1872–1915)

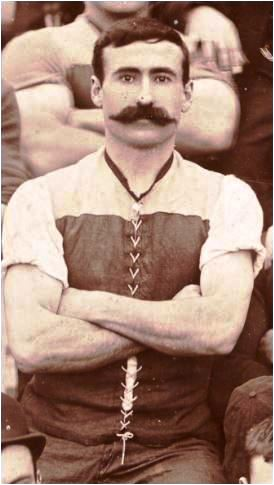
- Casey in 1896

Personal information
- Full name: William Orlando Casey
- Born: 18 December 1872; Richmond, Tasmania
- Died: 25 November 1915 (aged 42); Melbourne
- Original team: Southern Tasmania
- Position: Wing

Playing career^{1}
Years	Club	Games (Goals)
1896	Carlton (VFA)	15 (-)
1897–1900	Carlton	61 (2)
- ^{1} Playing statistics correct to the end of 1900.

William Orlando Casey (18 December 1872 – 25 November 1915) was an Australian rules footballer who played with Carlton in the Victorian Football League (VFL). After leaving Carlton, he went on to play for Northcote Juniors and Victorian Football Association (VFA) club Brunswick.
