= Tony Pickett =

Australian rules footballer

Personal information
- Full name: Anthony Pickett
- Born: 9 January 1953 (age 73)
- Original team: North Launceston
- Height: 178 cm (5 ft 10 in)
- Weight: 74 kg (163 lb)

Playing career^{1}
Years	Club	Games (Goals)
1976–1979	Carlton	60 (32)
- ^{1} Playing statistics correct to the end of 1979.

Anthony 'Tony' Pickett (born 9 January 1953) is a former Australian rules footballer who played for Carlton in the Victorian Football League (VFL) during the late 1970s.

Pickett was from Tasmania and won North Launceston's 'best and fairest' award back to back in 1974 and 1975. He was also a member of their 1975 NTFA premiership team.

He started well at Carlton, playing all possible 24 games in his first season, including a one-point Preliminary Final loss to North Melbourne. Pickett also had a memorable debut, against Collingwood at Princes Park, kicking four goals.

At the 1979 Perth State of Origin Carnival, Pickett was a Tasmanian representative.

Pickett left the VFL to undertake employment as a teacher. He taught for some years in England, before returning to his native state of Tasmania. He is married to Jane (née Fullagar), and has 2 daughters, Jennifer Adele Grubb (née Pickett) and Clare Pickett.

Tony Pickett was the 252nd inductee into the Tasmanian Hall of Fame, inducted in 2011.

Pickett is now retired and lives with his wife in Binalong Bay, Tasmania. He undertakes an active role in running the St. Helens bowls club.
