= Peter Hamilton (footballer, born 1956) =

Australian rules footballer (1956–2019)

Personal information
- Full name: Peter Maurice Hamilton
- Born: 17 October 1956
- Died: 6 July 2019 (aged 62)
- Original team: Ulverstone
- Height: 194 cm (6 ft 4 in)
- Weight: 95 kg (209 lb)
- Position: Forward

Playing career^{1}
Years	Club	Games (Goals)
1976–83	Melbourne	52 (1)
- ^{1} Playing statistics correct to the end of 1983.

Peter Maurice Hamilton (17 October 1956 – 6 July 2019) was an Australian rules footballer who played for Melbourne in the Victorian Football League (VFL).

Hamilton, despite appearing in eight VFL seasons, could only amass 52 games and spent most of his times playing reserves football. The closest he came to a full season was when he played 13 senior games in 1979. In the same year, he was a Tasmanian representative at the Perth State of Origin Carnival, having played at North West Football Union club Ulverstone early in his career.
