= Geoff Harrold =

Australian rules footballer

Personal information
- Born: 20 July 1953 (age 73)
- Original team: Bentleigh-McKinnon
- Height: 185 cm (6 ft 1 in)
- Weight: 74 kg (163 lb)

Playing career^{1}
Years	Club	Games (Goals)
1972	Melbourne	2 (0)
- ^{1} Playing statistics correct to the end of 1972.

Geoff Harrold (born 20 July 1953) is a former Australian rules footballer who played with Melbourne in the Victorian Football League (VFL).
