= Lew Massey (footballer) =

Australian rules footballer

Personal information
- Full name: Lewis Tarleton Massey
- Born: 13 February 1869; Woodbridge, Tasmania
- Died: 18 June 1944 (aged 75); Brighton, Victoria

Playing career^{1}
Years	Club	Games (Goals)
1897	Melbourne	8 (1)
- ^{1} Playing statistics correct to the end of 1897.

Lewis Tarleton Massey (13 February 1869 – 18 June 1944) was an Australian rules footballer who played with Melbourne in the Victorian Football League (VFL).
