= Darryl Sutton =

Australian rules footballer (1952–2017)

- Sutton during his North Melbourne career

Personal information
- Full name: Darryl Lewis Sutton
- Born: 27 July 1952; Hobart, Tasmania
- Died: 28 January 2017 (aged 64); Melbourne, Victoria
- Original team: Glenorchy (TANFL)
- Height: 183 cm (6 ft 0 in)
- Weight: 84 kg (185 lb)

Playing career^{1}
Years	Club	Games (Goals)
1970-72, 1974–75	Glenorchy	83 (160)
1973, 1976–80	North Melbourne	91 (65)
1981	Swan Districts	17 (5)
1982–83	Richmond	6 (0)
1983	Sydney Swans	14 (25)
1984-86	North Hobart	38 (130)
Total		249 (385)
- ^{1} Playing statistics correct to the end of 1986.

Career highlights
- VFL Premiership player: (1977); TANFL Premiership player: (1975); 2x All-Australian team: (1979, 1980)

Darryl Lewis Sutton (27 July 1952 – 28 January 2017) was an Australian rules footballer who played for the North Melbourne Football Club, Richmond Football Club and the Sydney Swans in the Victorian Football League (VFL). He also played for the Glenorchy Football Club and North Hobart Football Club in the Tasmanian Australian National Football League (TANFL).

== History ==
Born at Calvary Hospital, Hobart to Lew Sutton and Margaret (Meg) (née Collis), Sutton was a utility player and was recruited to North Melbourne in 1973 from Tasmanian Australian National Football League (TANFL) side Glenorchy but left the club after just one season, due to ill health, and returned to Glenorchy.

Sutton's second stint with North Melbourne began in 1976 and was more successful. He kicked five goals in that year's one point Preliminary Final win over Carlton but they lost the Grand Final to Hawthorn.

During his 91 games Sutton was used in both defence and up forward and was a member of their 1977 premiership side. He earned All Australian selection in both 1979 and 1980 for his performances as captain of Tasmania at the 1979 and 1980 state carnivals. Before he retired from the VFL in 1983 Sutton played with two more clubs, first Richmond and after a season and a half played out his final year at Sydney.

In 1984 he was appointed captain-coach of North Hobart in the TANFL for three seasons, starring with 12 goals in the 1984 First Semi Final victory over New Norfolk in a stint which saw the Demons play finals football in his first year, in his last year as coach of the Demons he guided his side into the finals where they were beaten in the 1st Semi Final of the newly expanded TFL Statewide League competition.

Sutton died from pneumonia, but had been suffering dementia in the latter years of his life.

Tasmanian football legend Peter Hudson, who played with and against Sutton, paid tribute upon hearing of his death:

He had an enormous leap, that was one of his strengths. The fact he could jump so high, I loved having him in our team at Glenorchy. I was so thrilled when Darryl not only went to North Melbourne but played so well. He was a very integral part of their side. He wasn’t a big player, he wasn’t a giant by any stretch of the imagination, but because of his leap he could play a number of positions.

North Melbourne premiership teammate Peter Keenan described Sutton as a game changer, citing his five goals in the 1976 Preliminary final and adding that he "was just one of those players who could turn it on. And a good bloke to boot".
