= Michael Young (Australian rules footballer) =

Australian rules footballer

Personal information
- Born: 16 December 1958
- Died: 16 September 2018 (aged 59)
- Original team: Clarence (TANFL)
- Debut: Round 15, 1977, Carlton vs. St Kilda, at Moorabbin Oval
- Height: 187 cm (6 ft 2 in)
- Weight: 81 kg (179 lb)

Playing career^{1}
Years	Club	Games (Goals)
1977–1980	Carlton	37 (12)
1981–1983	Melbourne	15 (3)
Total		52 (15)
- ^{1} Playing statistics correct to the end of 1984.

Career highlights
- Carlton premiership player 1979

Michael Young (16 December 1958 – 16 September 2018) was an Australian rules footballer who played for the Carlton Football Club and Melbourne Football Club in the Victorian Football League (VFL). He was also listed at the Essendon Football Club, but he did not play a game.

Young made his debut with Carlton midway into the 1977 season and played as a wingman in Carlton's 1979 premiership side. He crossed to Melbourne in 1981.

He died from cancer in September 2018.
