= Robert Neal =

Australian rules footballer, born 1956

Personal information
- Born: 16 December 1956 (age 69)
- Original team: Wynyard (NWFU)
- Debut: Round 7: 13 Jul 1974, Geelong vs. Melbourne, at Kardinia Park
- Height: 178 cm (5 ft 10 in)
- Weight: 82 kg (181 lb)

Playing career^{1}
Years	Club	Games (Goals)
1974–1986	Geelong	200 (51)
1987–1988	St Kilda	20 (1)
Total		220 (52)
- ^{1} Playing statistics correct to the end of 1988.

Robert "Scratcher" Neal (born 16 December 1956) is a former Australian rules footballer in the Victorian Football League.

Playing with the Geelong Football Club, he wore the number 35 during his tenure at the club. Scratcher crossed to StKilda where he played 20 matches in number 36 in 1987 before changing to his familiar 35.
