= Cleveland, Tasmania =

Cleveland
- Town
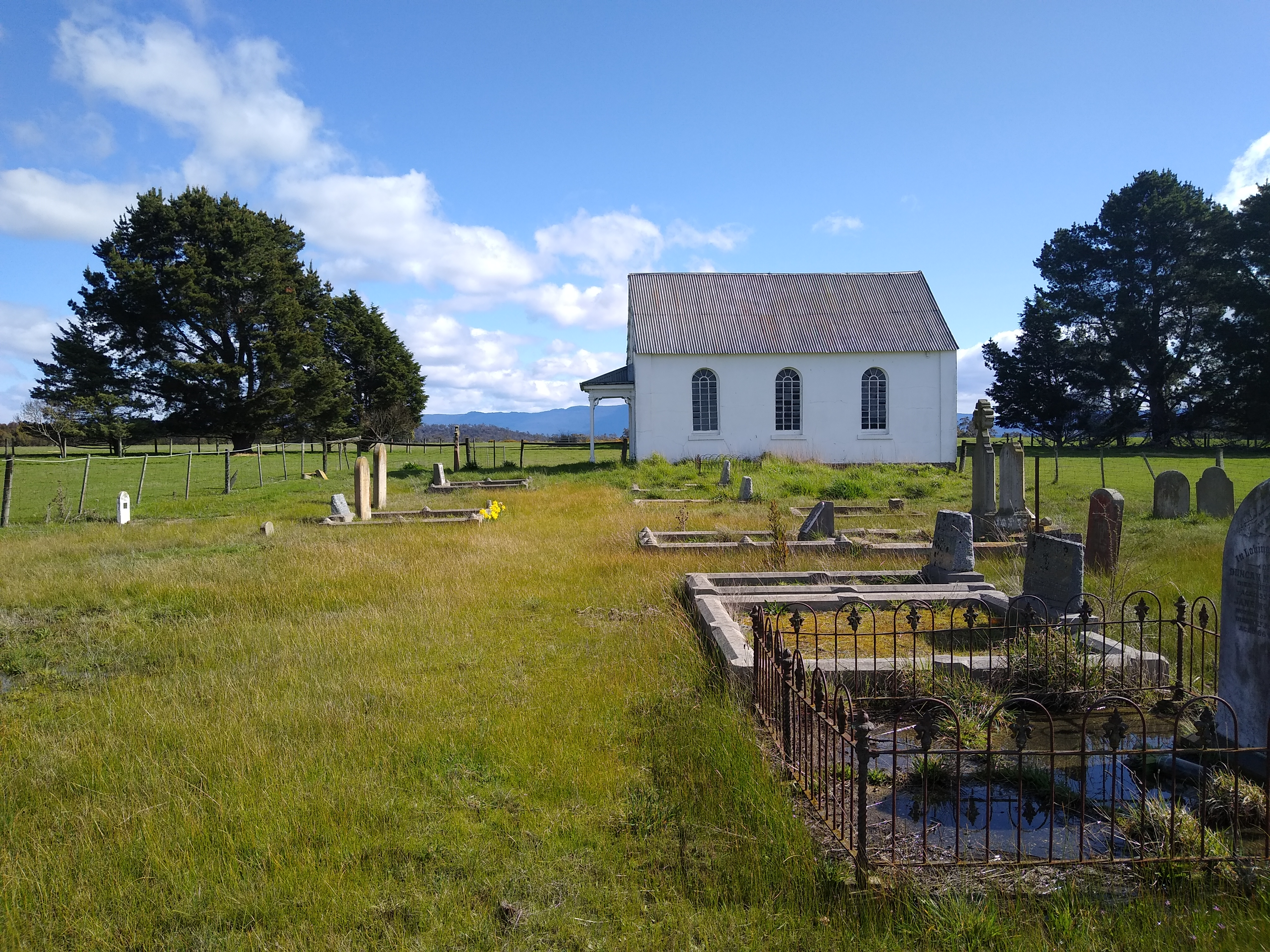
- Cleveland Church

- Coordinates: 41°48′07″S 147°23′57″E
- Country: Australia
- State: Tasmania
- Region: Central
- LGA: Northern Midlands
- Location: 38 km (24 mi) SE of Longford

Government
  - State electorate: Lyons
  - Federal division: Lyons

Population
  - Total: 45 (2016 census)
- Postcode: 7211
Localities around Cleveland
Epping Forest	Epping Forest	Conara
Epping Forest	Cleveland	Conara
Campbell Town	Campbell Town	Conara

Cleveland is a rural locality in the local government area (LGA) of Northern Midlands in the Central LGA region of Tasmania. The locality is about 38 kilometres (24 mi) south-east of the town of Longford. The 2016 census recorded a population of 45 for the state suburb of Cleveland.

== History ==
Cleveland was gazetted as a locality in 1972.

It is believed to have been named in the 1830s for a breed of horses that were being imported and bred in the district.

== Geography ==
Most of the boundaries are survey lines. The North-South Railway Line runs through from north to east.

== Road infrastructure ==
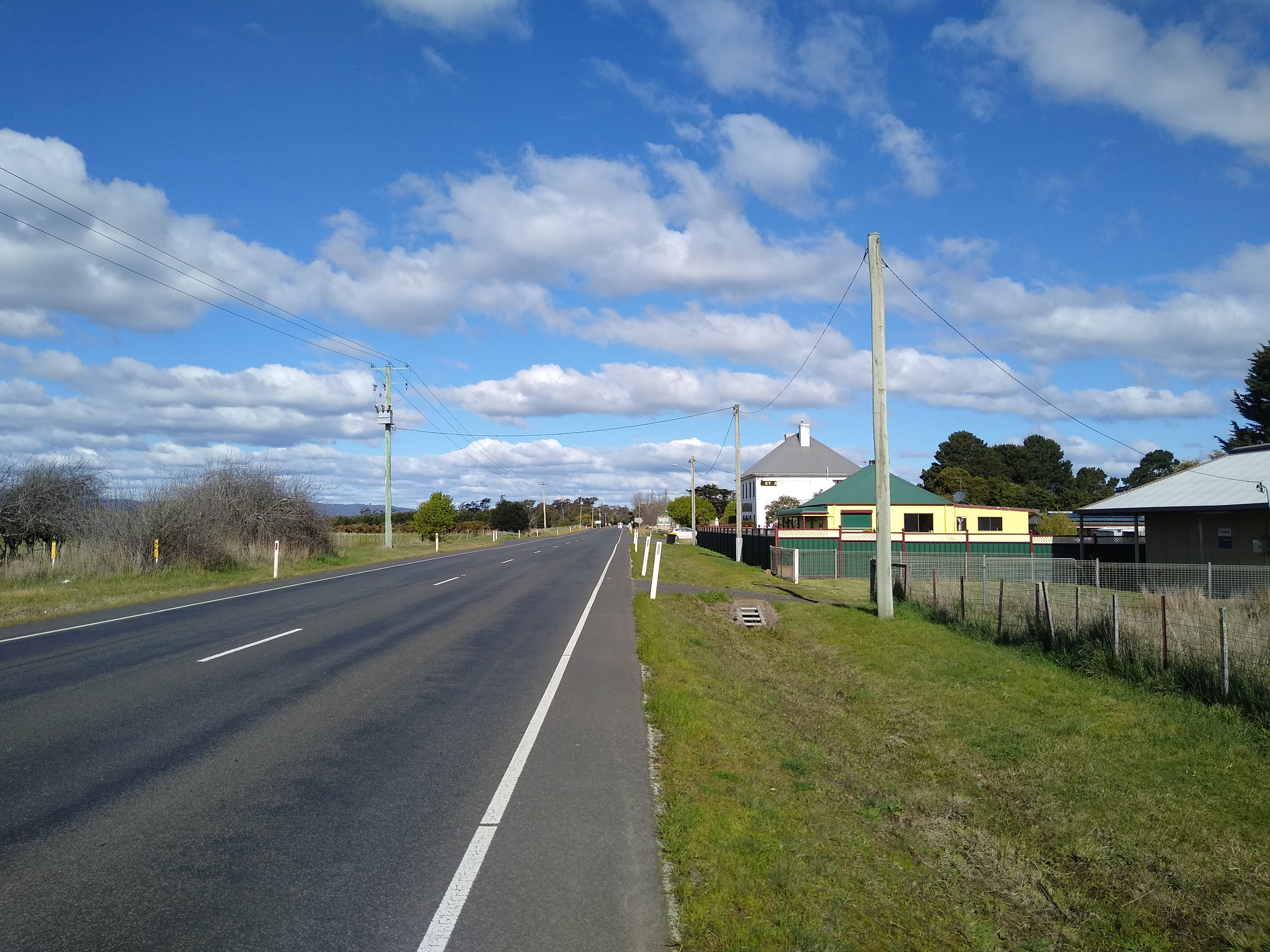
National Highway in Cleveland

National Highway 1 (Midland Highway) passes through from north to east.
