= Stephen Mount =

Australian rules footballer

Personal information
- Born: 5 March 1960 (age 66)
- Original team: Sandy Bay
- Height: 187 cm (6 ft 2 in)
- Weight: 86 kg (190 lb)

Playing career^{1}
Years	Club	Games (Goals)
1979–1982	Richmond	31 (9)
1983-1985	South Fremantle	42 (42)
1986-1987	Perth	48 (42)
Total		121 (93)
- ^{1} Playing statistics correct to the end of 1982.

Stephen Mount (born 5 March 1960) is a former Australian rules footballer who played for Richmond in the Victorian Football League (VFL).

Mount played four seasons with Richmond, his nine games in 1980 including the club's 81 point Grand Final win over Collingwood. He left Richmond after managing just one game in 1982, heading west to join South Fremantle in the West Australian Football League. Mount played 42 matches for South Fremantle between 1983 and 1985 before switching to Perth for the next three seasons, playing another 48 matches for the Demons.

He is now at St. Kevin's College in Melbourne teaching Science, Health and P.E.
