= Stephen Carey =

Australian rules footballer

Personal information
- Born: 14 October 1959 (age 67)
- Original team: North Launceston (NTFA)
- Height: 180 cm (5 ft 11 in)
- Weight: 89 kg (196 lb)

Playing career^{1}
Years	Club	Games (Goals)
1980–1986	Essendon	105 (6)
1986	Geelong	7 (0)
Total		112 (6)
- ^{1} Playing statistics correct to the end of 1986.

Stephen Carey (born 14 October 1959) is a former Australian rules footballer who played with Essendon and Geelong in the Victorian Football League (VFL).

Essendon recruited Carey from North Launceston and by 1981 he had found a regular place in the Bombers' defence. He played in their 1983 Grand Final loss to Hawthorn but was part of their side two years later when they turned the table on Hawthorn and won the 1985 premiership. Carey was traded to Geelong just after the beginning of the 1986 season in what would be his final year in the VFL.

Carey coached Warragul Football Club in the West Gippsland Latrobe Football League in 2009.
