= Graham Hunnibell =

Australian rules footballer and coach (born 1955)

Personal information
- Full name: Graham Charles Hunnibell
- Born: 2 January 1955 (age 71)
- Original team: North Launceston
- Height: 193 cm (6 ft 4 in)
- Weight: 96 kg (212 lb)
- Position: Ruckman

Playing career^{1}
Years	Club	Games (Goals)
1978–1980	Melbourne	12 (2)
- ^{1} Playing statistics correct to the end of 1980.

Graham Charles 'Moose' Hunnibell (born 2 January 1955) is a former Australian rules footballer who played for Melbourne in the Victorian Football League (VFL). He also had a noted career in Tasmania, where he played at North Launceston, New Norfolk and Clarence.

Hunnibell, who was a ruckman, first appeared with Melbourne in the 1978 VFL season. He had been a NTFA representative back in Tasmania and kicked one of his two career goals on debut, in a win over Geelong at Waverley Park, where Neville Bruns was also debuting. After two further seasons at Melbourne, spent mostly in the reserves, Hunnibell returned to Tasmania.

Back at his original club, North Launceston, in 1981, Hunnibell won his second club 'Best and Fairest' award that year as well as appearing their premiership team, as he had in 1975. The following season he crossed to New Norfolk and played in another premiership side and he also won the first of three 'Best and Fairest' awards, with the others coming as captain-coach in 1984 and 1985. He had his best season in 1985 when he won the William Leitch Medal, to go with the Lefroy Medal which he won three years earlier. The ruckman finished his career at Clarence and took home their 'Best and Fairest' award in 1989, meaning that he had been a club champion at three separate clubs.

A 17 time Tasmanian interstate representative, Hunnibell was inducted into the Tasmanian Football Hall of Fame in 2006.
