= Robert Shaw (footballer) =

Australian rules footballer, born 1955

Personal information
- Full name: Robert Shaw
- Born: 6 January 1955 (age 71); Hobart, Tasmania
- Original team: Sandy Bay
- Height: 189 cm (6 ft 2 in)
- Weight: 88 kg (194 lb)
- Position: Defender

Playing career^{1}
Years	Club	Games (Goals)
1974–81	Essendon	51 (8)

Representative team honours^{2}
Years	Team	Games (Goals)
1979–80	Tasmania	6

Coaching career^{3}
Years	Club	Games (W–L–D)
1988–93	Tasmania	
1991–94	Fitzroy	86 (28–58–0)
1995–96	Adelaide	44 (17–27–0)
- ^{1} Playing statistics correct to the end of 1981.^{2} Representative statistics correct as of 1980.^{3} Coaching statistics correct as of 1996.

Robert Shaw (born 6 January 1955) is an Australian former Australian rules footballer with the Essendon Football Club and coach in the VFL/AFL with the Fitzroy and Adelaide Football Clubs. Shaw was recruited from Sandy Bay Football Club in Tasmania.

== Playing career ==
=== Essendon ===
Recruited from Tasmanian club, Sandy Bay, Shaw played 51 games between 1974 and 1981 for the Essendon Football Club and was noted as a talented defender who was struck down by injury throughout a promising career. Shaw underwent nine major operations finally retiring at the end of the 1982 season.

=== Tasmania State of Origin ===
Shaw also represented Tasmania in the 1979 and 1980 State of Origin carnivals and overall played six games for his state.

== Coaching career ==
=== Early coaching career roles ===
Shaw was then appointed by Essendon Football Club senior coach, Kevin Sheedy as a specialist opposition analyst. In 1984, Shaw captain-coached Clarence Football Club in the Tasmanian Football League. In doing so, the team won the premiership in 1984 and finished as runners-up in 1985. He retired at the end of the 1985 season before returning to Essendon as assistant coach in 1986. He embarked on a coaching career, first with the Clarence Football Club in Tasmania in 1984–85. Shaw was then appointed Essendon Football Club assistant coach from 1986 to 1988 then transferred to Fitzroy Football Club as assistant coach between 1989 and 1990. Shaw coached Fitzroy to the VFL reserves premiership in 1989, defeating Geelong by two points. This represents Fitzroy's last premiership success. Shaw coached Tasmania at the 1988 Bicentennial Carnival and was Tasmania's State of Origin coach from 1990 to 1993. He successfully coached Tasmania to victory over Victoria in 1990 and was named assistant coach in Tasmania's Team of the Century. He was an inaugural inductee in the Tasmanian Football League's Hall of Fame and in 2008 was elevated to Legend status. He is also a Life Member of the Essendon Football Club and an AFL 200 Club Member.

=== Fitzroy Football Club senior coach (1991–1994) ===
Shaw then replaced Rod Austin as Fitzroy Football Club senior coach, after Austin's contract wasn't renewed after the 1990 season, and from 1991 to 1994, Shaw was the senior coach of Fitzroy. Shaw coached Fitzroy to 28 wins and 58 losses from 86 games and despite the adverse financial situation at Fitzroy, Shaw was considered to have been successful in making the Lions competitive. With limited resources he was able to develop many young players into high quality AFL footballers. Tactically astute, he never had the depth of playing talent to win many games, but was able to draw out the best from his playing group to be highly competitive. At the end of the 1994 season, Shaw left the Fitzroy Football Club because he said "he’d lost his fire", and was replaced by Bernie Quinlan as Fitzroy Football Club senior coach.

=== Adelaide Football Club senior coach (1995–1996) ===
Shaw then replaced Graham Cornes as Adelaide Football Club senior coach, because the club wanted a new coach after a disappointing 1994 season. Shaw then coached Adelaide Football Club from 1995 to 1996. Including pre-season games Shaw coached for over 150 games and was highly regarded for his tactical ability and opposition analysis. However, Adelaide under Shaw finished eleventh in the 1995 season and twelve in the 1996 season. The 1996 season had a promising start, with four consecutive wins, but the Crows then lost 14 of the next 18 games. Shaw coached Adelaide to a total of 44 games with 17 wins and 27 losses. At the end of the 1996 season, Shaw stepped down as senior coach of Adelaide Football Club after he told the board of the club "If you want to do it now, let’s do that...I will stand down. I haven’t worked out for you, and my family situation is unacceptable”. Shaw was then replaced by Malcolm Blight as Adelaide Football Club senior coach.

Shaw coached six seasons and 130 senior AFL games without taking a team to the finals, a record surpassed only by Alec Hall from the early 20th century.

=== Essendon Football Club assistant coach (1999–2005) ===
Shaw returned to be the assistant coach at Essendon Football Club from 1999 to 2005 under senior coach Kevin Sheedy, which included the club's 2000 premiership victory. Shaw left Essendon at the conclusion of the 2005 season.

== Head coaching record ==
Team	Year	Home and Away Season					Finals			
Team	Year	Won	Lost	Drew	Win %	Position	Won	Lost	Win %	Result
FIT	1991	4	18	0	.182	14th out of 15	—	—	—	—
FIT	1992	9	13	0	.409	10th out of 15	—	—	—	—
FIT	1993	10	10	0	.500	11th out of 15	—	—	—	—
FIT	1994	5	17	0	.227	14th out of 15	—	—	—	—
FIT Total		28	58	0	.326		0	0	.000	
ADE	1995	9	13	0	.409	11th out of 16	—	—	—	—
ADE	1996	8	14	0	.364	12th out of 16	—	—	—	—
ADE Total		17	27	0	.386		0	0	.000	
Total		45	85	0	.346		0	0	.000	

== Other roles ==
In December 2005, Shaw then took up a position at Fremantle Football Club as General Manager of Football Operations. Shaw left the Fremantle Football Club at the end of the 2008 season to return to Victoria.

Shaw went on to be a teacher at Brighton Grammar School in 2009. which included his role as Director of Football and First XVIII coach. He coached the school to three APS premierships in a row from 2014 to 2016. Shaw also writes extensively on Twitter under @shawry_analyst.

He currently works part time at Essendon Football Club as Schools Recruiting Consultant and is a casual relief teacher in the north west suburbs of Melbourne. Shaw has a master's degree in Sport Management and an Applied Science Degree majoring in Physical Education.

== Personal life ==
Shaw is the uncle of Australian test cricketer Tim Paine, and the cousin of Collingwood brothers Tony, Ray and Neville Shaw. He attended Rose Bay High School in Hobart.
