= 1969 Adelaide Carnival =

Tournament details
- Country: Australia
- City: Adelaide
- Dates: 7–14 June 1969
- Format: Round-robin
- Teams: 4

Final positions
- Champions: Victoria

The 1969 Adelaide Carnival was the 17th edition of the Australian National Football Carnival, an Australian football interstate competition.

Four teams competed in the carnival, South Australia, the Victorian Football League, Tasmania and Western Australia. Victoria finished on top of the table after winning all of their games. Peter Hudson kicked 17 goals in the carnival, the next best was Austin Robertson with 15.

The Victorian Football Association was scheduled to have competed in the Carnival, but was disqualified after it allowed players to cross from the VFL to the VFA without formal clearances during the 1969 season, in defiance of an ANFC directive from the previous year.

== Squads ==
Victoria

Name	Club	Age
John Nicholls (c)	Carlton	29
Kevin Bartlett	Richmond	22
Peter Bedford	South Melbourne	22
Barry Bourke	Melbourne	25
George Bisset	Footscray	26
Barry Davis	Essendon	25
Ross Dillon	Melbourne	21
Darryl Gerlach	Essendon	25
Daryl Griffiths	St Kilda	23
Royce Hart	Richmond	21
Peter Hudson	Hawthorn	23
Alex Jesaulenko	Carlton	23
Bob Keddie	Hawthorn	23
Sam Kekovich	North Melbourne	19
Bob Murray	St Kilda	26
Kevin Murray	Fitzroy	30
John 'Sam' Newman	Geelong	23
John Newnham	Fitzroy	26
Peter Steward	North Melbourne	27
David Thorpe	Footscray	21
Peter Walker	Geelong	26
Terry Waters	Collingwood	26
Ricky Watt	Collingwood	22
Fred Way	South Melbourne	25

South Australia

Name	Club	Age
John Cahill (c)	Port Adelaide	29
Brenton Adcock	Sturt	25
John Birt	West Torrens	32
Keith Chessell	Sturt	22
Brian Colbey	Glenelg	22
Peter Darley	South Adelaide	24
Robert Day	West Adelaide	25
Ron Elleway	Port Adelaide	26
Ken Eustice	Glenelg	29
Jim Forsyth	West Torrens	24
Darryl Hicks	Sturt	27
Harry Kernahan	Glenelg	31
Peter Marker	Glenelg	21
Craig McKellar	Woodville	19
Graham Molloy	Norwood	21
Philip 'Sandy' Nelson	Sturt	22
Damien Nygaard	Norwood	24
Robert Oatey	Norwood	25
Jack Pannenburg	West Adelaide	22
Keith Pattinson	Glenelg	23
John Phillips	North Adelaide	24
Dennis 'Fred' Phillis	Glenelg	20
Rodney Pope	West Adelaide	24
Barrie Robran	North Adelaide	21
Rick Schoff	Sturt	28

Western Australia

Name	Club	Age
Derek Chadwick (c)	East Perth	28
Paddy Astone	Perth	25
Greg Brehaut	Perth	22
Mal Brown	East Perth	22
Barry Cable	Perth	25
Tony Casserly	East Fremantle	25
Pat Dalton	Perth	26
Dave Dyson	West Perth	24
Peter Eakins	Subiaco	21
Graham Farmer	West Perth	34
Bob Graham	East Perth	27
Peter Manning	Swan Districts	23
John McIntosh	Claremont	25
Ian Miller	Perth	19
Graham Melrose	East Fremantle	20
Chris Mitchell	East Perth	22
Brian Roberts	East Fremantle	24
Austin Robertson	Subiaco	26
Graham Scott	South Fremantle	22
Brian Sierakowski	Subiaco	23
Brad Smith	East Perth	20
Peter Stephen	East Fremantle	20
John Turnbull	Swan Districts	27
Bill Walker	Swan Districts	27
John Wynne	West Perth	21

Tasmania

Name	Club	Age
John Devine (c)	North Hobart	28
Darrel Baldock	Latrobe	30
John Burns	East Launceston	20
Bob Cheek	Penguin	23
Phillip Dell	Wynyard	22
Kerry Doran	Sandy Bay	23
Alby Dunn	Launceston	24
Ray Groom	Cooee	24
Ron Hall	Scottsdale	23
Barry Hay	Launceston	24
Phil Lade	Penguin	22
Graeme Lee	East Devonport	29
Ted Lees	Devonport	21
Bob Lucas	Clarence	25
Bob Lynch	New Norfolk	24
Graeme Mackey	Sandy Bay	20
Max McMahon	Glenorchy	27
John Neal	Wynyard	22
Ben Nusteling	New Norfolk	22
Alf Oldenhof	City-South	23
Burnie Payne	Hobart	29
Kevin Pelham	Sandy Bay	27
John Richmond	Clarence	26
Paul Vinar	Longford	28
Graham Wise	Launceston	26

== Results ==
Game One

Team	Score
Victoria	23.21 (159)
Tasmania	10.26 (86)

Game Three

Team	Score
South Australia	21.22 (148)
Tasmania	12.18 (90)

Game Five

Team	Score
Western Australia	28.24 (192)
Tasmania	12.7 (79)

Game Two

Team	Score
South Australia	15.17 (107)
Western Australia	14.11 (95)

Game Four

Team	Score
Victoria	21.18 (144)
Western Australia	14.13 (97)

Game Six

Team	Score
Victoria	15.11 (101)
South Australia	8.9 (57)

== All-Australian team ==
In 1969 the All-Australian team was picked based on the Adelaide Carnival.

1969 All-Australian Team Adelaide Carnival
Name	State/League	Club
John Cahill	South Australia	Port Adelaide
Brian Colbey	South Australia	Glenelg
Peter Darley	South Australia	South Adelaide
Graham Molloy	South Australia	Norwood
Rick Schoff	South Australia	Sturt
Royce Hart	Victoria	Richmond
Peter Hudson	Victoria	Hawthorn
Alex Jesaulenko	Victoria	Carlton
Bob Keddie	Victoria	Hawthorn
Bob Murray	Victoria	St Kilda
John 'Sam' Newman	Victoria	Geelong
John Nicholls	Victoria	Carlton (captain)
Peter Steward	Victoria	North Melbourne
Terry Waters	Victoria	Collingwood
Ricky Watt	Victoria	Collingwood
Greg Brehaut	Western Australia	Perth
Barry Cable	Western Australia	Perth
Peter Eakins	Western Australia	Subiaco
John McIntosh	Western Australia	Claremont
Bill Walker	Western Australia	Swan Districts

== Tassie Medal ==
Peter Eakins of Western Australia and Graham Molloy of South Australia won the Tassie Medal after both tallying four votes.
