= 1966 Brownlow Medal =

- Winner: Ian Stewart (St Kilda); 21 votes

Television/radio coverage
- Network: Seven Network

The 1966 Brownlow Medal was the 39th year the award was presented to the player adjudged the fairest and best player during the Victorian Football League (VFL) home and away season. Ian Stewart of the St Kilda Football Club won the medal by polling twenty-one votes during the 1966 VFL season.

== Leading votegetters ==
	Player	Votes
1st	Ian Stewart (St Kilda)	21
2nd	John Nicholls (Carlton)	17
3rd	John Sharrock (Geelong)	16
=4th	Neville Crowe (Richmond)	14
=4th	Darrel Baldock (St Kilda)	14
=6th	Denis Marshall (Geelong)	12
=6th	Hassa Mann (Melbourne)	12
8th	John Goold (Carlton)	11
9th	Ian Bryant (Footscray)	10
=10th	Errol Hutchesson (Collingwood)	9
=10th	Norm Brown (Fitzroy)	9
=10th	Brian Dixon (Melbourne)	9
