= Interstate matches in Australian rules football =

Interstate Australian Football
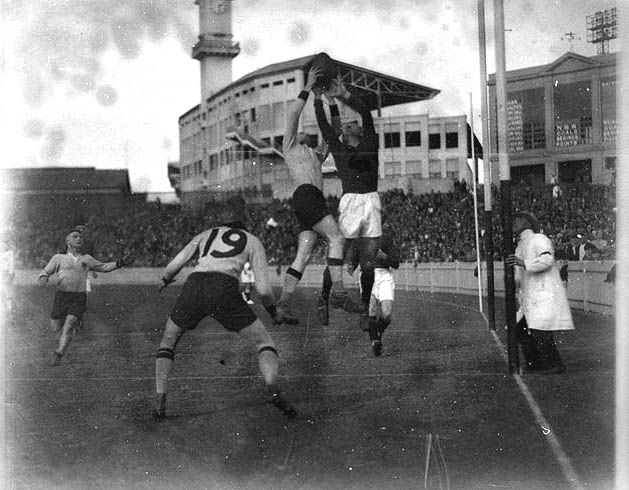
- Players contest a mark at the Australian Football Carnival, in 1933, at the Sydney Cricket Ground. The teams are New South Wales and Western Australia.
- Sport: Australian rules football
- Type: Representative football
- First meeting: 1879
- Next meeting: 2027

Statistics
- Most wins: Victoria (17)

Interstate matches in Australian rules football are Australian rules football matches between representative teams, initially between the colonies and later states and territories of Australia. Senior intercolonial representative matches took place from 1879 to the turn of the 20th century. For most of the 20th century, the absence of a national club competition in Australia meant that interstate matches were regarded as important events. Though all states and territories have been represented on at least one occasion in Australian football, the states of Victoria, Western Australia and South Australia have typically been the dominant states, reflecting the sport's strong following in those regions.

Interstate matches were, in most cases, sanctioned and coordinated by the Australian National Football Council (ANFC), which organised every national championship series from the first-ever national carnival, the Jubilee Australasian Football Carnival in 1908 with the exception of the last-ever series: the 1993 State of Origin Championships, which was run by the AFL Commission. The series took place on approximately three-yearly intervals between 1908 and 1993; these were usually a fortnight-long tournament staged in a single host city, although some – particularly those played in the 1980s – were based on the results of matches played in different cities throughout the year. Between 1937 and 1988, the player judged the best at each of these carnivals was awarded the Tassie Medal; and between 1953 and 1988, the selection of All Australian Teams was based on the player's performance during Australian Football Carnivals, and the team was named after each carnival concluded.

Until 1977, interstate Australian rules football games were played by teams representing the major football leagues or organisations, with players representing the state or territory they were playing in at the time. From 1977, players were selected for their states under partial or full state of origin selection rules. Football historian John Devaney has argued that "some of the state of origin contests which took place during the 1980s constituted arguably the finest expositions of the game ever seen". .

As the Victorian Football League nationalised and became the Australian Football League (AFL) in 1990, interstate matches were gradually regarded with less importance, and the fixtures went into sustained hiatus in 1999, with only two one-off matches over the next twenty-five years. Regular senior state of origin matches returned as pre-season fixtures in 2026, with matches presently scheduled each year until 2029.

In the pre-state of origin selection history, Victoria was the dominant state in representative football, winning 16 of the 19 carnivals up until 1975. Competition was more even during the nine competitions held in the state of origin selection era, with championships shared among Western Australia (4), South Australia (3) and Victoria (2).

Since the early 1990s, representative matches featuring players from the second-tier state leagues (namely the Victorian Football League, South Australian National Football League and West Australian Football League) have been played annually, as well as matches at underage level as part of the AFL's men's and women's underage national championships.

== History ==
=== Intercolony / Interstate competition, 1879–1939 ===
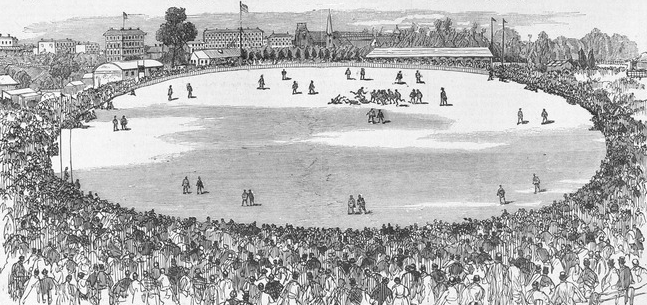
Victoria vs South Australia at the East Melbourne Cricket Ground in 1879

Victoria, the birthplace of Australian rules and, with contributing factors such as population and finances, dominated the first hundred years of intercolonial and interstate football. This was the case in the first-ever intercolonial representative match, held on Tuesday, 1 July 1879 (a public holiday), at East Melbourne Cricket Ground. The final score was Victoria (represented by the Victorian Football Association) 7.14 to South Australia 0.3. The match was attended by more than 10,000 people.

The third and fourth teams to commence intercolonial competition were New South Wales and Queensland, playing each other in a two-game series in Brisbane in 1884; the result of the series was a one-all draw. Tasmania played its first game, against Victoria, in 1887. New Zealand (Maori) entered the competition with a draw against New South Wales in Sydney, on 29 June 1889.

Victoria's long-term dominance briefly faltered in the 1890s, when other colonies recorded their first-ever wins over the Victoria: South Australia in Adelaide in 1890 and 1891 and Tasmania in Hobart in 1893 (twice). In 1897, the new Victorian Football League split from the VFA, and the two selected separate representative teams, further weakening Victoria in intercolonial competition, which became interstate competition following Federation of the six British colonies in Australia, in 1901.

Western Australia played its first two interstate games in 1904, including a win over South Australia in Adelaide. The Australasian Football Council was established 1906, and it assumed administration for interstate football.

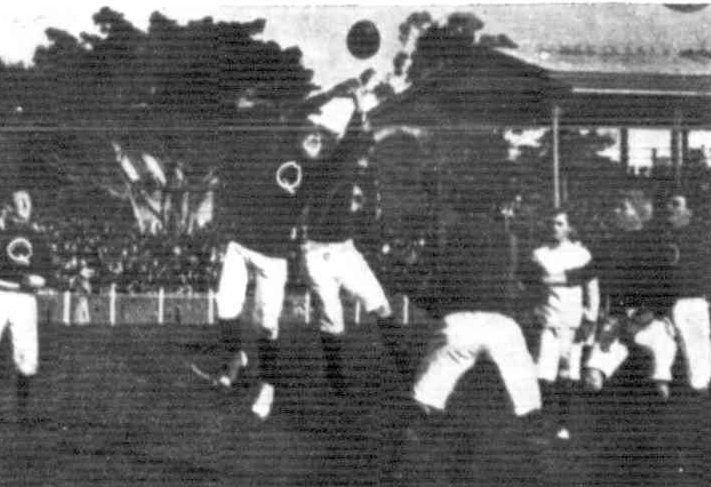
Queensland vs Tasmania at the Jubilee Carnival in 1908

The VFL's dominance within Victoria was established by the time an interstate carnival was held for the first time – in Melbourne in 1908 – to celebrate the Golden Jubilee of "Australasian football" (as it was known at the time). The widening gap between the three major footballing states/leagues and the others was shown in the organisation of the competition: Victoria (represented by the VFL), South Australia and Western Australia constituted "Section A", and Tasmania, New South Wales, Queensland and New Zealand constituted "Section B". The VFA did not take part and the carnival was New Zealand's last appearance in representative football. Victoria went through the competition undefeated.

The second carnival was played in 1911, in Adelaide, which set the pattern of a carnival every three years. South Australia went undefeated and Victoria won three of their four matches. At the Sydney carnival of 1914, Victoria was once again undefeated. Following the onset of World War I interstate matches went into a five-year hiatus.

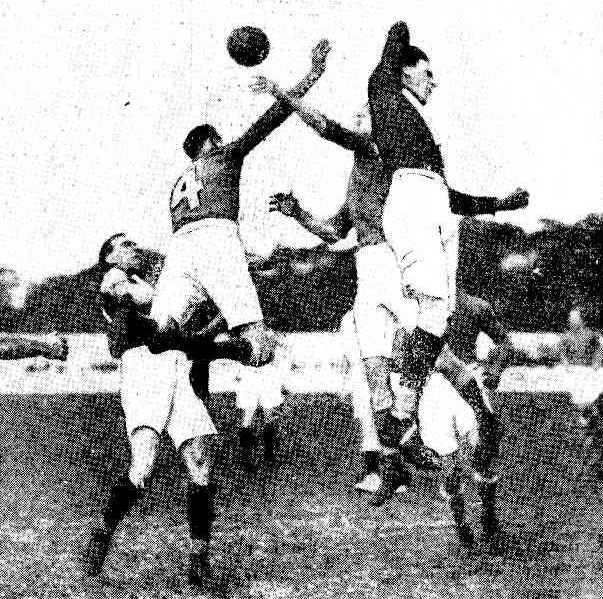
Action from New South Wales first ever defeat of Victoria by 15 points at the Sydney Cricket Ground in 1923

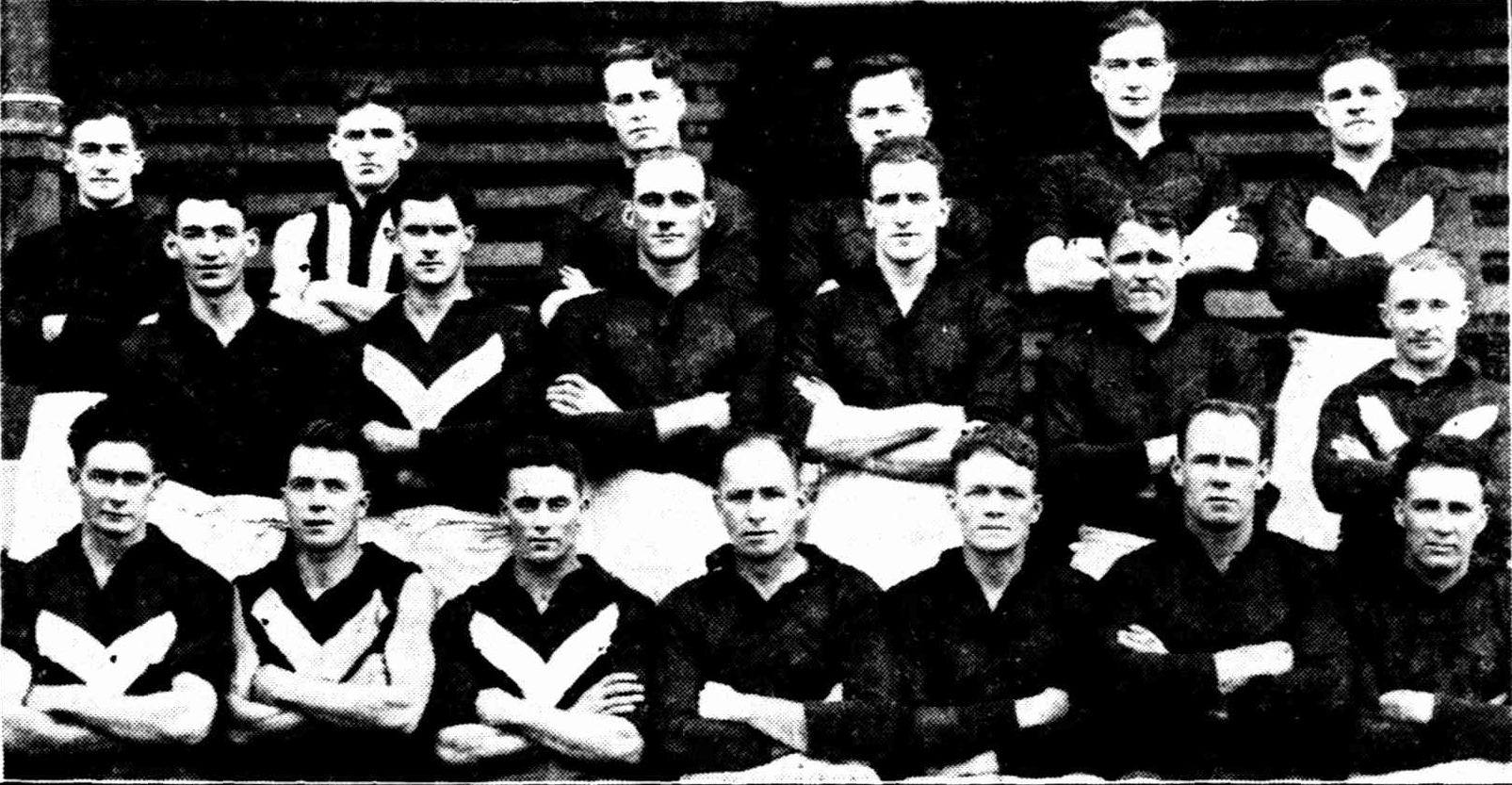
Victoria's "Big V" team of 1928.

Throughout following decades, standalone interstate matches were held every year, and interstate carnivals were held usually every three years, with a few exceptions. In most carnivals following World War II, the stronger states competed separately from the minor states; and on many occasions the stronger states and minor states carnivals were held in separate locations or years. At the peak of its popularity, the carnival was known symbolically as "the Ashes" of Australian rules football. Victoria (VFL) continued its dominance in interstate football by winning 17 of the 20 carnivals held between the period 1908 to 1975, and usually winning the individual matches held every year.

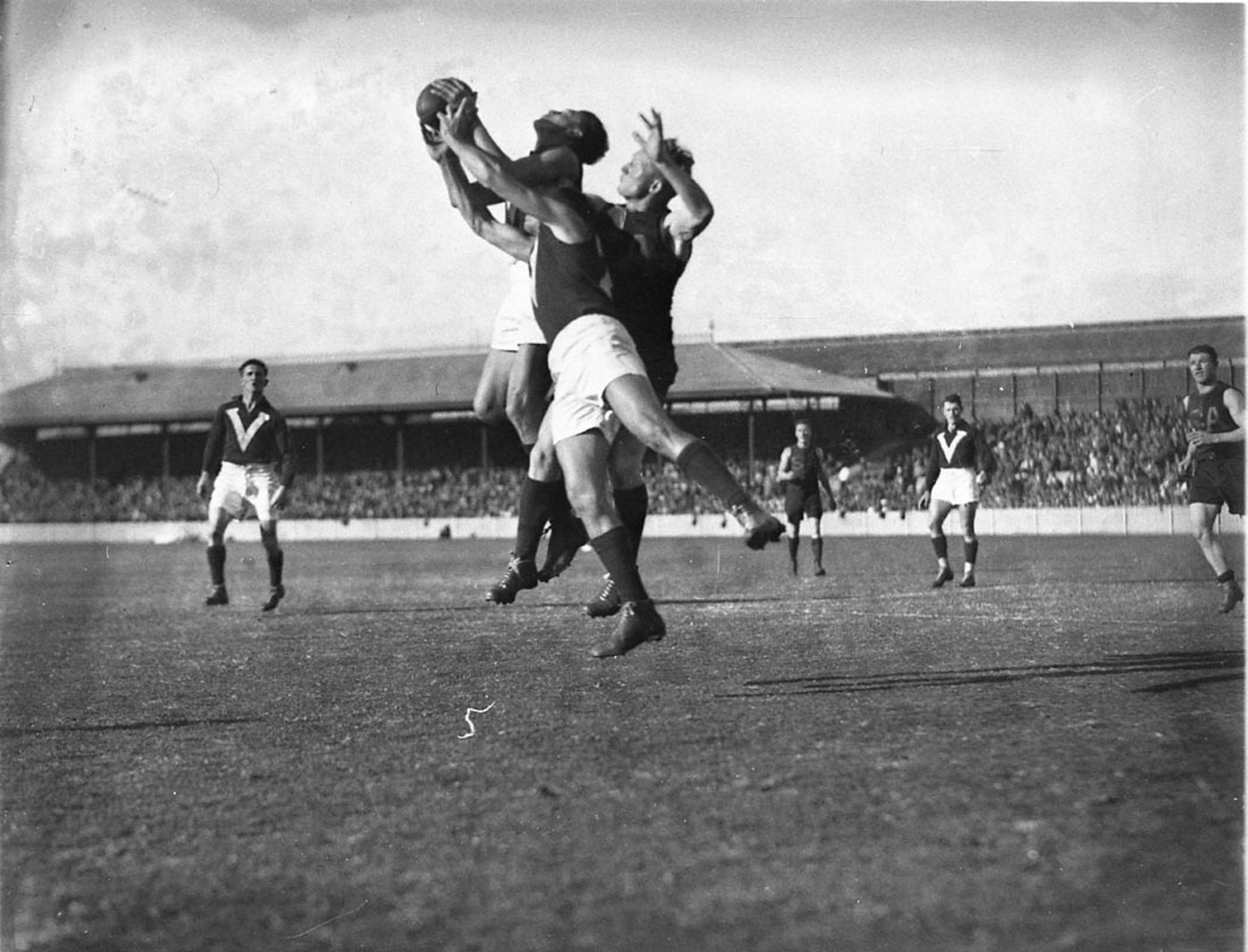
Victoria v South Australia at the Australian National Football Council Interstate Carnival Sydney Cricket Ground 1933

Some notable moments during this period were, the 1923 Victorian loss to South Australia, which was described as the state's worst ever defeat. The 1923 South Australian upset loss to an undermanned Tasmania. The championship-deciding game of the 1924 carnival, between Victoria and Western Australia, was reported as being the roughest on record. Also in 1924 South Australia recorded the concepts highest winning score, winning by 268 points to defeat Queensland in Hobart. In the 1925 calendar year, Canberra played its first match against New South Wales. In 1923 & 1925 Victoria lost shock upsets to New South Wales. In 1927, in the Australia National Football Carnival Victoria beat Western Australia 11.10 to 10.12, in what has been described as one of the hardest and fiercest games fought in the history of the code. In 1928 Victoria and South Australia participated in the first drawn representative match: the visiting Victorians led for most of the match, with South Australia kicking three late goals to give the state the victory by a point; however, after the match, it was discovered that the scoreboard had failed to record one of Victoria's behinds, and the match was declared a draw.

=== Post World War II (1945 to 1977) ===
In the second game between South Australia and Victoria after war, the states participated in the second representative draw, in a high scoring affair with the side locked in at 123 to 123 at full time. In 1948, Victoria played Western Australia for the first time in ten years, which Western Australia went on to win by 38 points, in what was described as a memorable victory.

The Australian National Football Council expanded in 1949, which saw the Victoria Football Association and the Australian Amateur Football Council each re-enter teams in carnival and interstate competitions. The Amateurs were frequent winners of the second division carnivals, and the VFA recorded an upset 8-point win against South Australia at the 1950 interstate carnival. The VFA overall had mixed results while readmitted back, with some wins over some of the main states, and large losses, and established a rivalry with Tasmania against whom it had a number of close results on both sides. In 1959, Victoria beat Western Australia by 178 points, with the loss in Western Australia being taken so badly that it had been reported as potentially being the end of interstate football in the state. Tasmania finished of the decade strongly, with two surprise carnival upsets over South Australia in 1956 and 1958 and Western Australia in 1958.

In the first half of the 1960s saw a brief changing of the guard, with South Australia and Western Australia recording several wins over Victoria, and an upset win by Tasmania over Victoria in 1960, considered one of Tasmanian football's greatest moments. Also the 1963 Tasmanian victory over reigning interstate carnival champions Western Australia. Those were Victoria's last losses of the pre-origin selection era, and Victoria went on a 12-year winning streak against Western Australia and an 18-year winning streak against South Australia.

Neil Kerley and Graham Cornes were of significance in the rivalry between Victoria and South Australia, who played for and coached the South Australia team during this period. Neil Kerley when coaching the South Australian team would engender a hatred for Victoria, telling his players that all Victorian umpires and players cheated. Graham Cornes, who was coached by Kerley for South Australia and was later a coach and central figure in the promotion of interstate football in South Australia, later stated that his hatred for Victoria came from Neil Kerley, and in establishing the culture in South Australia of wanting to prove superiority over Victoria. In the 1963 game, after Victorian Jack Dyer was asked what he would do if he was coaching Victoria, and disrespectfully responded I'd give them a pep talk and go to the races, Kerley opened the match by putting down two Victorians with heavy bumps, and South Australia went on to win by seven points.

In the first half of the 1970s, there were some important games played: in 1970 Western Australia played Victoria in Melbourne, with the home side winning by six points. The match was notable because of a native born Western Australian player, playing for Victoria, being involved in the winning play. After the match with the result not taken well in the west, because of the observation that this had been a regular occurrence, it was first started being mentioned that games should be played on State of Origin criteria. Likewise in the 1974 game between the states, with the same result occurring, with again a Western Australia player being involved in the winning play, it was reported in the west as being the last straw. After the game Western Australia began to negotiate for games to be played under State of Origin criteria.

Also in 1970 after a decade of surprise upsets, and large disappointing defeats, Tasmania recorded a memorable victory over Western Australia. In the lead up to the match, an over confident Western Australian captain Polly Farmer, announced to the media that That his side simply could not countenance anything other than a convincing win, and "If we can't beat Tasmania, we ought to give the game away,. The Tasmanians stormed home in the final moments to win the game by two points. With the game notable, for thousands screaming onto the ground after the final siren. In 1974 the Northern Territory first participated in the concept, with a win over Queensland.

=== State of Origin competition, 1977–1988 ===
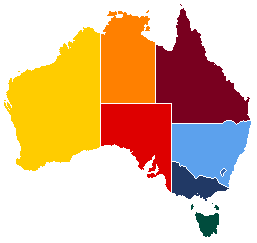
Map of Australia with each State/Territory shaded in their main jumper colour

By the 1970s, VFL clubs were signing up an increasing number of the best players from other states and Victoria dominated state games. Led by Leon Larkin, marketing manager of the Subiaco Football Club, Western Australia began to campaign for players to be selected according to state of origin rules. The (WAFL) negotiated with the (VFL) for two years before agreement was reached on the format. In the first such game, at Subiaco Oval in Perth, on 8 October 1977, Western Australia defeated Victoria, 23.13 (151) to 8.9 (57), a huge reversal of the results in most previous games. In the words of football historian John Devaney:

"A Western Australian team composed entirely of home-based players had, on 25 June, taken on a Victorian team containing many of the same players who would return to Perth three and a half months later for the state of origin clash. The respective scores of the two matches offered a persuasive argument, if such were needed, of the extent to which the VFL had denuded the WAFL of its elite talent:

- On 25 June 1977 Victoria 23.16 (154) defeated Western Australia 13.13 (91) – a margin of 63 points
- On 8 October 1977 Western Australia 23.13 (151) defeated Victoria 8.9 (57) – a margin of 94 points, representing an overall turn around of 157 points

Western Australia's previous biggest winning margin against a Victorian state team had been a mere 38 points in 1948.
Almost overnight, an inferiority complex was dismantled: Victoria, it seemed, was not intrinsically superior, only wealthier."

Games involving each of the other states soon followed. Western Australia and South Australia began to win more games against Victoria.

A full interstate carnival under state-of-origin selection was held with success in October 1979 in Perth. A second carnival was held the following October in Adelaide, but it was a financial disaster for the organisers, with only 28,245 people attending the four games. Following this series, the VFL decided to not participate in any future carnivals, which put the future of the carnival concept in doubt.

Between 1983 and 1987 there was a new format introduced, with only Victoria, South Australia and Western Australia competing, where each team would play each other once during the year, rather than in a standalone carnival, and with a points system and percentage used to declare the winner. Through this period, State of Origin football continued to be popular. However, after 1986, the concept began to wane in popularity in Western Australia, with the entrance of West Coast into the expanded Victorian Football League in 1987. When the 1988 Adelaide Bicentennial Carnival ran at a loss, the carnival concept was considered near finished.

=== 1990s: decline and end ===
With sponsorship from Carlton and United Breweries and the support of South Australia, the Commission organised for a blockbuster match in 1989, the first between South Australia and Victoria at the Melbourne Cricket Ground since 1971. A record State of Origin crowd of 91,960 at the match (significantly exceeding the VFL's prediction of 70,000) signalled a strong return. The minor-states carnival continued in 1989, although the Northern Territory withdrew due to financial reasons and because the carnival was played outside its conventional summer season timing. The AFL later gained formal affiliations with these states and territories signalling the end of the NFL's involvement in interstate football. The AFL Commission, taking over the role from the NFL in 1991 ruled out the minor states including Queensland and New South Wales from again playing the major states under State of Origin rules. Ad hoc matches continued to be scheduled between 1989 and 1992 without a carnival. With the expansion of the Australian Football League into Queensland and Western Australia in 1987 and South Australia in 1991, the top Victorian players were now playing football matches in those states every second week as part of club matches, and a major part of the representative football's appeal disappeared.

The last interstate series recognised as a carnival was played in 1993; as a once-off, the AFL season was shortened from 22 rounds to 20 to accommodate the carnival, and two new composite teams QLD/NT and NSW/ACT were introduced. However, from 1992 until 1994, unusual timeslots and high ticket prices made the games inaccessible to many spectators. In 1994, Graham Cornes criticised the Commission for its poor promotion of State of Origin in comparison with its rugby league equivalent, while also noting the negative impact that the nationalisation of the AFL had on interstate football's prestige.

In its five-year plan released in August 1994, the AFL Commission attempted to reinvigorate State of Origin; this included setting aside a free week in the fixture, and introducing a new composite team to be known as the Allies to represent all states outside Victoria, South Australia and Western Australia and be more competitive against them. Before a large crowd in 1995, between the Victoria and South Australia game at the Melbourne Cricket Ground Ted Whitten, promoter of Victoria and State of Origin, was terminally ill with prostate cancer, and was paraded around the ground prior to the match, with Mariah Carey's Hero being played over the PA system, for his service to the concept and the game, in a moment which has been voted as the most memorable moment in the game's history. However, Tom Hafey noted an increase in clubs discouraging players from playing due to risk of injury, and an increasing reluctance from players themselves.

There were two state of origin matches were played on a free weekend in the AFL season each year between 1995 and 1998, and they featured the same four teams: the Allies, Victoria, South Australia and Western Australia – but aside from 1997 when a Victoria and South Australia game drew a large crowd, low crowds and an annual $800,000 cost to stage the series persisted. Only one match was played in 1999, with Victoria 17.19 (121) defeating South Australia 10.7 (67) before a crowd of 26,063 in rainy conditions. It proved to be the last state of origin game before the fixture went on long term hiatus: the match was dropped from the 2000 season because the season's compressed schedule – which saw it played a month earlier than usual to accommodate the 2000 Summer Olympics in Sydney – did not allow for the week's break; but did not return to the calendar thereafter.

=== One-off matches and revival in the 2020s ===
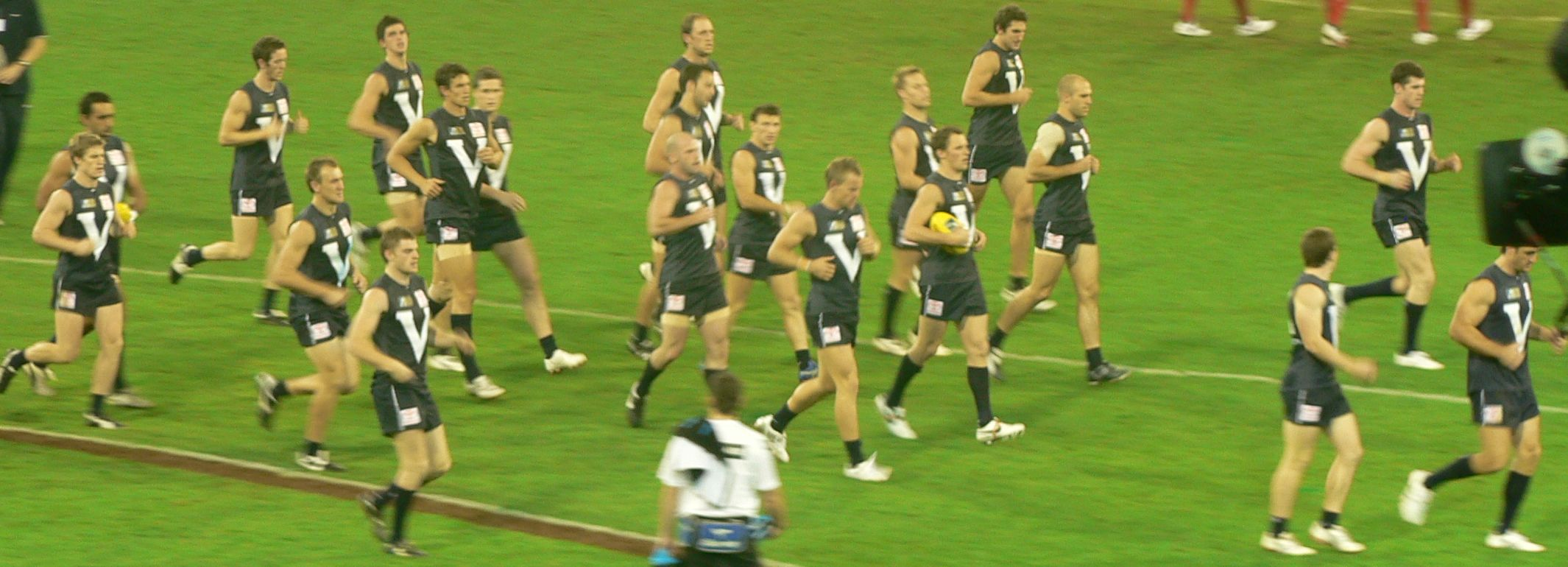
Victoria running out for the Hall of Fame Tribute Match in 2008.

Action from the 2020 State of Origin for Bushfire Relief Match

Over the first quarter of the 21st century, there were two once-off representative matches played, each between Victoria and a single composite team representing the rest of Australia and the world under state of origin selection rules. The first was the AFL Hall of Fame Tribute Match, held on a May weekend in 2008 as part of that season's celebration of the 150th anniversary of the birth of Australian rules football. The second was the State of Origin for Bushfire Relief Match, a benefit match played during the 2020 preseason to raise funds for the recovery after the 2019–20 Australian bushfire season.

In February 2026, the AFL staged an interstate match between Western Australia and Victoria as the first competitive pre-season match of the AFL season. Branded the 2026 AFL Origin, the match was attended by 58,141 spectators at Perth's Optus Stadium. Considered a success, it led to a revival of regular state of origin football; and by the end of the year, a start-of-preseason state of origin match had been fixtured for each of the next three years, with matches featuring Western Australia, Victoria and South Australia, and fixtured in Perth and Adelaide.

== Importance ==
At its peak, interstate matches were among the most important events on the annual football calendar in South Australia, Western Australia and Tasmania. The crowds drawn to interstate matches in those states regularly dwarfed home-and-away crowds, and at times throughout history would match or exceed grand final attendances. In Perth, interstate matches at the 1921 carnival, during the 1929 season, and at the 1937 carnival successively set records as Western Australia's highest-ever sports crowd; the crowd of 40,000 drawn to that 1937 match was more than 10,000 higher than any previous Western Australian crowd and almost double the record club grand final crowd at that time. Likewise in Tasmania, carnival fixtures in 1924, 1947 and 1966 each set new Tasmanian state football attendance records, and the 1966 carnival crowd of 23,764 remains the third-highest football attendance in Tasmania's history. State of Origin matches in the 1980s in South Australia and Western Australia regularly drew crowds between 30,000 and 50,000, on par with grand finals in those states during that era; and interstate matches in Tasmania consistently drew crowds which either exceeded or were second only to the Tasmanian league's grand final attendances.

Interstate football was less popular in Victoria than it was in the other states. One match in Victoria in 1989 against South Australia set the national interstate football record crowd of 91,960, with 10,000 people turned away at the gate, and other large crowds at interstate games in Victoria were between 60,000 and 70,000, on par with some large home-and-away games but lower than a typical finals attendance. But, at its lowest, interstate games in Victoria during the 1930s could sometimes fail to draw 10,000 spectators – less than the average home-and-away crowd – at a time when state record crowds were drawn to the matches elsewhere. Eventually, due to these lower levels of public interest, less interstate football came to be played in Victoria: for the majority of the 1980s, when State of Origin football was at its peak, the Victorian team did not play a single match at home. The primary reason for the difference in popularity between Victoria and the other states was the Victorian team's historical dominance in interstate football. Particularly during the pre–State of Origin era, the Victorian team was always expected to win and regularly won easily; therefore, Victorian spectators were disinclined to attend matches because there was little importance on offer for victory and a high chance of a one-sided contest. The record crowd of 91,960 in Melbourne in 1989 came after South Australia had beaten Victoria three years in a row, demonstrating that Victorian fans were willing to embrace interstate football when the rivalry and contests were closely fought. Additionally, differences in supporter culture between the states meant that club football and club parochialism had much greater importance in Victoria than in the other states.

Amongst the competing states, the rivalry with Victoria was the strongest. Victoria's long-term dominance of interstate football created a culture of disdain towards it; as a result, the most popular games always involved Victoria, and beating Victoria was considered the pinnacle of interstate football in South Australia and Western Australia. South Australia's rivalry towards Victoria was characterised during the 1980s with the slogan "Kick a Vic".

Players from all states, including Victoria, viewed selection and participation in interstate football with great importance. Ted Whitten, who was widely noted for his involvement in and passion for the Victorian team, described how "the players would walk on broken glass to wear the Victorian jumper". Graham Cornes, well known for his involvement in the South Australian team, always spoke equally proudly of the experience of representing his state. John Platten, a highly decorated player, described a drought-breaking victory playing for South Australia, over Victoria, as one of his proudest football moments. Comments from other players included:

- Matthew Lloyd (Victoria) – immense pride – you feel like you walk a bit taller when you pull on the Big V.
- Stephen O'Reilly (Western Australia) – State of Origin football is the pinnacle for AFL players.
- Andrew McKay (South Australia) – I never dreamt of playing VFL/AFL as a child, but I always dreamt of playing for my state.
- Graham Cornes (South Australia) – pulling the South Australian jumper on is like a dream come true.
- Tony Lockett (Victoria), who commented after he won the E. J. Whitten Medal – this will probably go down as one of the happiest days of my life, and I'll treasure it forever.

== Selection criteria ==
The State of Origin eligibility rules varied from game to game, and matches during the 1980s were sometimes played under partial, rather than full, State of Origin rules. This was in large part so that neutral leagues were not disrupted by a stand-alone game between two other states; e.g. VFL clubs would not lose access to interstate origin players on the weekend of a game between South Australia and Western Australia. For example, in the stand-alone 1982 match between South Australia and Victoria, a quota of up to six VFL players of South Australian origin, and no more than one from any VFL club, could play for South Australia; but otherwise, all SANFL and VFL players were eligible to play for South Australia and Victoria respectively – indeed Victoria fielded five VFL players of Western Australian origin in that match, including their captain, Mike Fitzpatrick. Jason Dunstall and Terry Daniher, who were born in and recruited from Queensland and New South Wales respectively, both played several partial-origin matches for Victoria; and in a partial-origin match against Victoria in 1990. New South Wales was allowed to be represented by players of New South Welsh origin and any player who had played for the Sydney Swans and Queensland was allowed to be represented by players of Queensland origin and any player who had played for the Brisbane Bears/Lions. Changes made in 1990 set a player's state of origin based on his registered state at age 15.

Roger Merrett has played for and captained both Victoria (1984) and Queensland (1991).

== State of Origin in popular media ==
Greg Champion wrote a song, "Don't Let The Big V Down", about the traditional navy blue jumper with a large white V used to represent Victoria in state games. The song is about a young man who is about to play his first state game and is approached by another man, who is Ted Whitten, and tells him to not let the Big V down.

Champion also wrote another song, "Came From Adelaide", about two people watching a game between South Australia and Victoria. One of them turns to the other and says that the Croweaters cannot play. The other replies that this is not true and that the South Australians are great.

== TV broadcast ==
TV Network	Icon	Coverage years	Format(s)
Seven		1977–1986	State of Origin/Carnival(s)
ABC		1987	State of Origin/Carnival(s)
Nine		1988	State of Origin//Carnival(s)
Seven		1989–1999	State of Origin/Carnival(s)
Ten		2008	Hall of Fame Tribute match
Seven		2017	State of Origin Women
Seven		2020	State of Origin For Bushfire Relief
Seven		2026–present	State of Origin

== Teams ==
Team	Icon	Senior years	Selection basis	Representation	Best on ground
Allies (Men)		1995–1998	State of origin	NSW, ACT, QLD, TAS, NT	Alex Jesaulenko Medal
Allies (Women)		2017	State of origin	All non-Victorians	
All Stars		2020	State of origin	All non-Victorians	
Amateurs		1950–1988	League	Australian Amateur Football Council leagues	
Australian Capital Territory/Canberra		1925–1988	League, state of origin	Australian Capital Territory	
Dream Team		2008	State of origin	All non-Victorians	
New South Wales		1881–1992	League, state of origin	New South Wales	
NSW/ACT		1993	State of origin	NSW, ACT	
New Zealand		1889–1908	League	New Zealand	
Northern Territory		1988	State of origin	Northern Territory	
Queensland		1884–1992	League, state of origin	Queensland	
Queensland/Northern Territory		1993	State of origin	Queensland, Northern Territory	
South Australia		1879–2027	League, state of origin	South Australia	Fos Williams Medal
Tasmania		1887–1993	League, state of origin	Tasmania	Lefroy Medal
Victoria		1879–2028	League, state of origin	Victoria (VFL post-1897)	E. J. Whitten Medal
Victoria (VFA)		1950–1988	League, state of origin	Victoria (VFA)	
Western Australia		1904–2027	League, state of origin	Western Australia	Simpson Medal, Graham Moss Medal

== Rivalries ==
=== Victoria vs South Australia ===
The rivalry between Victoria and South Australia was considered the strongest in state football. Although there is a bitter rivalry on both sides, the make-up of the rivalry is slightly different: for Victoria, being the most successful state in interstate football, it meant that protecting that reputation was of prominent importance; for South Australia, the rivalry stemmed from dislike, and the feeling that Victorians did not give the state the respect it deserved. Graham Cornes, who was heavily involved in South Australian state football, described the football culture in Victoria as insular and having a lack of regard for football outside the state which drove that feeling.

Many footballers described beating Victoria as one of the top achievements in South Australian football. Neil Kerley ranked beating Victoria above his club premierships. Victorian footballers have commented on the passion and hatred directed towards them in interstate games played in Adelaide. Garry Lyon described the fans as "hostile and maniacal" and "by the time the games came around they were whipped into a frenzy". Paul Roos commented about the first state game he played in South Australia that "when walking up the entrance and onto Football Park was an experience in itself. I quickly realised how much hatred existed towards Victorians and their football."

=== Victoria vs Western Australia ===
There is also an intense rivalry between Victoria and Western Australia. Western Australia's rivalry likewise stemmed from the feeling in Western Australia that Victoria never gave their state the credit it deserved, despite some of the best players of all time coming from the state. The Victorian and Western Australian rivalry was summarised in the early part of the 20th century as a friendly rivalry. In contrast with the Victoria vs South Australia rivalry which is based on hatred. This was evident in the first match between Victoria and Western Australia in Melbourne in 1904, where, before the game, the home Victorians put on a function for the two sides as a welcome. The function was reported to be well received by both sides. This is in contrast to the previous year's Victoria vs South Australia game in Melbourne, where no such function was held. After the rivalry evolved from first to the latter half of the 20th century, when Victoria stated to lure many of Western Australia's best players because of money, the rivalry started to take on dislike from Western Australia's part.

Some games widely regarded as some of the best in the history of Australian football were played between Victoria and Western Australia in the 1980s. Shane Parker, a former Western Australia player, said of the rivalry: "When I was a kid, the State of Origin games were the greatest ever. It was a really big thing to see the WA side play, particularly against Victoria."

=== Western Australia vs South Australia ===
There was an intense rivalry between Western Australia and South Australia, with fans at games between the states always vociferous and parochial.

== Records ==
=== State of Origin (1977–present) ===
==== Individual ====
- Most games: 16 Stephen Kernahan (1983–1996) South Australia
- Most goals: 66 Stephen Kernahan (1983–1996) South Australia
- Most goals in one game: 10 Stephen Kernahan (1984 vs Victoria) South Australia

==== Team ====
State	Games	Wins	Losses	Winning Percentage
Northern Territory	3	3	0	100%
New South Wales	4	3	1	75.0%
Victoria	54	34	20	62.9%
South Australia	30	16	14	53.3%
Allies	4	2	2	50.0%
Western Australia	35	16	19	45.7%
Queensland	8	2	6	25.0%
Tasmania	14	3	11	21.4%
Australian Capital Territory	5	1	4	20.0%
Sources: Code Sports. WA Footy; Last updated: 15 February 2026, post WA v VIC.

== Results ==
=== Australian National Football Carnival (1908–1993) ===
For most of the 20th century, there was a national football carnival usually held every three to five years. In most carnivals the format was a round-robin, with a points system under which the team with most points at the end of the tournament was declared the winner. Some of the carnivals the format consisted of qualification matches at the start of the tournament, with the winners playing off in a final. The national football carnival was played under the league representative rules from 1908 to 1975, and then played under the state of origin rules from 1979 to 1993.

Carnival	City	Winners		Tassie Medallist	Team
Carnival	City	Section A	Section B	Tassie Medallist	Team
Matches played under league representative rules
1908 Jubilee Australasian Football Carnival	Melbourne	Victoria	Tasmania	—	
1911 Adelaide Carnival	Adelaide	South Australia	—N/a	—	
1914 Sydney Football Carnival	Sydney	Victoria	—N/a	—	
1921 Perth Football Carnival	Perth	Western Australia	—N/a	—	
1924 Hobart Football Carnival	Hobart	Victoria	—N/a	—	
1927 Melbourne Football Carnival	Melbourne	Victoria	—N/a	—	
1930 Adelaide Football Carnival	Adelaide	Victoria	—N/a	—	
1933 Sydney Football Carnival	Sydney	Victoria	—N/a	—	
1937 Perth Football Carnival	Perth	Victoria	—N/a	Mick Cronin	(WAFL)
1947 Hobart Football Carnival	Hobart	Victoria	Tasmania	Les McClements; Bob Furler	(WAFL) (ACTAFL)
1950 Brisbane Football Carnival	Brisbane	Victoria (VFL)	Amateurs	Terry Cashion	(TANFL)
1953 Adelaide Football Carnival	Adelaide	Victoria (VFL)	—N/a	Merv McIntosh	(WAFL)
1956 Perth Football Carnival	Perth	Victoria (VFL)	—N/a	Graham Farmer	(WAFL)
1958 Centenary Carnival	Melbourne	Victoria (VFL)	Amateurs	Allen Aylett; Ted Whitten	(VFL) (VFL)
1960 Minor States Carnival	Canberra/Sydney	—N/a	Victoria (VFA)	—	
1961 Brisbane Football Carnival	Brisbane	Western Australia	—N/a	Brian Dixon	(WAFL)
1966 Hobart Football Carnival	Hobart	Victoria (VFL)	—N/a	Barry Cable	(WAFL)
1968 Minor States Carnival	Canberra	—N/a	Amateurs	—	
1969 Adelaide Football Carnival	Adelaide	Victoria	—N/a	Peter Eakins; Graham Molloy	(WAFL) (SANFL)
1972 Perth Football Carnival	Perth	Victoria	—N/a	Ken McAullay	(WAFL)
1974 Minor States Carnival	Sydney	—N/a	Queensland	—	
1975 Knockout Football Carnival	Adelaide/Melbourne	Victoria	—N/a	—	
Matches played under State of Origin rules
1979 State of Origin Carnival	Perth	Western Australia	Queensland	Brian Peake	(WAFL)
1980 State of Origin Carnival	Adelaide	Victoria	—N/a	Graham Cornes	(SANFL)
1983 Australian Football Championships	Adelaide/Perth	Western Australia	—N/a	Stephen Michael	(WAFL)
1984 Australian Football Championships	Adelaide/Perth	Western Australia	—N/a	Brad Hardie	(WAFL)
1985 Australian Football Championships	Adelaide/Perth	Victoria	—N/a	Dale Weightman	(VFL)
1986 Australian Football Championships	Adelaide/Perth	Western Australia	—N/a	Brad Hardie	(WAFL)
1987 Australian Football Championships	Adelaide/Perth	South Australia	—N/a	Mark Naley	(SANFL)
1988 Bicentennial Carnival	Adelaide	South Australia	Northern Territory	Paul Salmon	(VFL)
1993 State of Origin Championships	Adelaide/Hobart/Melbourne	South Australia	Queensland/ Northern Territory	—	

=== Australian rules league representative matches (1904–2022) ===
The team names in bold indicate the winning teams.

Year	Round	Home team	Score	Away team	Score	Ground	City	Crowd	Date	Time	Network
1995		QAFL	9.17 (71)	WAFL	14.14 (98)	Gabba	Brisbane	2,200	2/07/1995		
1990		SANFL	17.19 (121)	WAFL	24.26 (100)	Football Park	Adelaide	21,231	8/07/1990		
1988		SANFL	17.17 (119)	WAFL	11.13 (79)	Football Park	Adelaide	18,339	24/05/1988		Ten
1987		WAFL	9.9 (63)	SANFL	18.16 (124)	WACA Ground	Perth				ABC
1986		WAFL	18.19 (127)	SANFL	12.16. (88)	Football Park	Adelaide				
1985		WAFL	16.15 (111)	SANFL	30.18 (198)	Subiaco Oval	Perth		15/06/1985		
1984		SANFL	14.13 (97)	WAFL	14.14 (98)	Football Park	Adelaide	26,649			Seven
1983		WAFL	24.14 (134)	SANFL	16.14 (110)	Subiaco Oval	Perth		04/06/1983		Seven
1977		WAFL	13.12 (90)	VFL	23.16 (154)	Subiaco Oval	Perth	44,891	25/06/1977		Seven

=== State of Origin (1977–present) ===
Winning teams are indicated in bold. In 1980, two double-headers were played on 11 and 13 October respectively.

**1979 Perth State of Origin Carnival**

- S1QPO = Section 1 Qualification Play Off
- S1SF1 = Section 1 Semi Final 1
- S1SF2 = Section 1 Semi Final 2
- S13PP = Section 1 3rd Place Playoff
- S1GF = Section 1 Grand Final
- S2GF = Section 2 Grand Final

**1980 Adelaide State of Origin Carnival**

- SF1 = Semi Final 1
- SF2 = Semi Final 2
- 3PF = 3rd Place Final
- GF = Grand Final

**1988 Adelaide Bicentennial Carnival**

- S1 SF = Section 1 Semi Final
- S1 3PPO = Section 1 3rd Place Play Off
- S1 GF = Section 1 Grand Final
- S2 PS = Section 2 Preliminary Stage
- S2 WSPO = Section 2 Wooden Spoon Play Off
- S2 GF = Section 2 Grand Final

**1993 State of Origin Championships**

- S1 SF1 = Section 1 Semi Final 1
- S1 SF2 = Section 1 Semi Final 2
- S1 GF = Section 1 Grand Final
- S2 GF = Section 2 Grand Final

Year	Round	Home team	Score	Away team	Score	Ground	City	Crowd	Date	Time	Network
2029		Western Australia		Victoria		Optus Stadium	Perth				
2028		South Australia		Victoria		Adelaide Oval	Adelaide				
2027		Western Australia		South Australia		Optus Stadium	Perth		2027		
2026		Western Australia	15.11 (101)	Victoria	18.17 (125)	Optus Stadium	Perth	58,141	14/02/2026	4:40 PM	Seven
1999		Victoria	17.19 (121)	South Australia	10.7 (67)	MCG	Melbourne	26,063	29/05/1999	2:00 PM	Seven
1998		Allies	14.11 (95)	Victoria	22.16 (148)	Gabba	Brisbane	13,977	10/07/1998	7:00 PM	Seven
1998		South Australia	22.11 (143)	Western Australia	16.11 (107)	Football Park	Adelaide	18,204	11/07/1998	4:00 PM	Seven
1997		South Australia	12.13 (85)	Victoria	13.15 (93)	Football Park	Adelaide	40,595	21/06/1997	8:00 PM	Seven
1997		Western Australia	16.12 (108)	Allies	18.8 (116)	Subiaco Oval	Perth	16,795	20/06/1997	6:00 PM	Seven
1996		South Australia	20.6 (126)	Western Australia	13.13 (91)	Football Park	Adelaide	16,722	02/06/1996	2:30 PM	Seven
1996		Victoria	20.17 (137)	Allies	11.18 (84)	MCG	Melbourne	35,612	01/06/1996	2:10 PM	Seven
1995		Victoria	18.12 (120)	South Australia	8.9 (57)	MCG	Melbourne	64,186	17/06/1995	2:00 PM	Seven
1995		Western Australia	8.13 (61)	Allies	13.14 (92)	Subiaco Oval	Perth	15,722	18/06/1995	12:00 PM	Seven
1994		South Australia	11.9 (75)	Victoria	10.13 (73)	Football Park	Adelaide	44,598	03/05/1994	8:00 PM	Seven
1993	S1 SF1	Victoria	19.16 (130)	NSW/ACT	8.17 (65)	MCG	Melbourne	22,409	01/06/1993	7:00 PM	Seven
1993	S1 SF2	South Australia	19.13 (127)	Western Australia	14.7 (91)	Football Park	Adelaide	21,487	02/06/1993	8:00 PM	Seven
1993	S1 GF	Victoria	14.13 (97)	South Australia	16.13 (109)	MCG	Melbourne	31,792	05/06/1993	4:40 PM	Seven
1993	S2 GF	Tasmania	10.13 (73)	Queensland/ Northern Territory	16.14 (110)	Bellerive Oval	Hobart	9,660	06/06/1993	12:00 PM	Seven
1992		New South Wales	22.9 (141)	Queensland	6.12 (48)	SCG	Sydney	7,223	12/05/1992	7:00 PM	Seven
1992		Victoria	23.19 (157)	Western Australia	13.12 (90)	MCG	Melbourne	32,152	26/05/1992	7:00 PM	Seven
1992		South Australia	19.19 (133)	Victoria	18.12 (120)	Football Park	Adelaide	33,984	07/07/1992	12:00 PM	Seven
1991		Tasmania	14.20 (104)	Victoria	17.14 (116)	North Hobart Oval	Hobart	14,086	28/05/1991	12:00 PM	Seven
1991		South Australia	11.4 (70)	Victoria	12.14 (86)	Football Park	Adelaide	37,277	28/05/1991	8:00 PM	Seven
1991		Queensland	23.14 (152)	Victoria	15.8 (108)	Gabba	Brisbane	8,519	16/07/1991	12:00 PM	Seven
1991		Western Australia	19.13 (127)	Victoria	7.9 (51)	WACA Ground	Perth	24,397	16/07/1991	12:00 PM	Seven
1991		Western Australia	17.20 (122)	South Australia	11.12 (78)	Subiaco Oval	Perth				Seven
1990		New South Wales	13.8 (86)	Victoria	10.16 (76)	SCG	Sydney	13,482	22/05/1990	8:30 PM	Seven
1990		Tasmania	20.14 (134)	Victoria	14.17 (101)	North Hobart Oval	Hobart	18,651	24/06/1990	12:00 PM	Seven
1990		West. Australia	8.12 (60)	Victoria	14.13 (97)	WACA Ground	Perth	21,897	26/06/1990	6:30 PM	Seven
1990		South Australia	17.19 (122)	West. Australia	14.16 (100)	Football Park	Adelaide				Seven
1989		Western Australia	10.12 (72)	Victoria	19.12 (126)	WACA Ground	Perth	20,993	16/05/1989	12:00 PM	Seven
1989		Victoria	22.17 (149)	South Australia	9.9 (63)	MCG	Melbourne	91,960	01/07/1989	2:10 PM	Seven
1989		Tasmania	15.7 (107)	Victoria	25.13 (163)	North Hobart Oval	Hobart	12,342	02/07/1989	12:00 PM	Seven
1988	S2 PS	Northern Territory	19.20 (134)	Tasmania	10.8 (68)	Football Park	Adelaide	–	02/03/1988		Nine
1988	S2 PS	Amateurs	14.12 (96)	A.C.T.	12.11 (83)	Football Park	Adelaide	–	02/03/1988		Nine
1988	S1 SF	Victoria (VFL)	20.13 (133)	Western Australia	10.13 (73)	Football Park	Adelaide	5,195	02/03/1988		Nine
1988	S2 PS	Victoria (VFA)	17.10 (112)	Queensland	4.11 (35)	Football Park	Adelaide	–	03/03/1988		Nine
1988	S2 PS	Northern Territory	11.19 (85)	Amateurs	8.9 (57)	Football Park	Adelaide	–	03/03/1988		Nine
1988	S1 SF	South Australia	12.8 (80)	New South Wales	8.11 (59)	Football Park	Adelaide	5,755	03/03/1988		Nine
1988	S2 SF	Victoria (VFA)	18.20 (128)	A.C.T.	9.16 (70)	Norwood Oval	Adelaide	–	04/03/1988		Nine
1988	S2 WSPO	Tasmania	11.16 (82)	Queensland	10.10 (70)	Norwood Oval	Adelaide	–	04/03/1988		Nine
1988	S2 GF	Northern Territory	17.10 (112)	Victoria	9.13 (63)	Football Park	Adelaide	–	05/03/1988		Nine
1988	S1 3PPO	New South Wales	10.8 (68)	Western Australia	9.12 (66)	Football Park	Adelaide	–	05/03/1988		Nine
1988	S1 GF	South Australia	15.12 (102)	Victoria (VFL)	6.6 (42)	Football Park	Adelaide	19,387	05/03/1988		Nine
1988		Western Australia	15.9 (99)	Victoria	21.23 (149)	Subiaco Oval	Perth	23,006	05/07/1988		
1988		Western Australia	18.14 (122)	South Australia	17.13 (115)	BC Place	Vancouver				Nine
1987		South Australia	12.13 (85)	Victoria	11.15 (81)	Football Park	Adelaide	41,605	27/05/1987		ABC
1987		Western Australia	13.14 (92)	Victoria	16.20 (116)	Subiaco Oval	Perth	22,000	22/07/1987		ABC
1986		South Australia	18.17 (125)	Victoria	17.13 (115)	Football Park	Adelaide	43,143	13/05/1986		
1986		Western Australia	21.11 (137)	Victoria	20.14 (134)	Subiaco Oval	Perth	39,863	08/07/1986		
1985		South Australia	11.10 (76) (Note: The match was awarded to South Australia on protest due to Victoria playing with four interchange players instead of the permitted three.)	Victoria	20.13 (133)	Football Park	Adelaide	44,287	14/05/1985		
1985		Western Australia	9.11 (65)	Victoria	19.16 (130)	Subiaco Oval	Perth	38,000	16/07/1985		
1984		South Australia	16.8 (104)	Victoria	16.12 (108)	Football Park	Adelaide	52,719	15/05/1984		Seven
1984		Western Australia	21.16 (142)	Victoria	21.12 (138)	Subiaco Oval	Perth	42,500	17/07/1984		Seven
1983		South Australia	26.16 (172)	Victoria	17.14 (116)	Football Park	Adelaide	42,521	16/07/1983		Seven
1983		Western Australia	16.22 (118)	Victoria	16.19 (115)	Subiaco Oval	Perth	44,213	12/07/1983		Seven
1982		South Australia	18.19 (127)	Victoria	21.13 (139)	Football Park	Adelaide	40,399	17/05/1982		
1982		Western Australia	15.11 (101)	Victoria	19.10 (124)	Subiaco Oval	Perth	29,182	13/07/1982		
1982		South Australia	29.23 (197)	Western Australia	12.9 (81)	Football Park	Adelaide	27,283			
1982		Western Australia	21.18 (144)	South Australia	8.5 (53)	Subiaco Oval	Perth				
1981		Western Australia	16.23 (119)	Victoria	13.12 (90)	Subiaco Oval	Perth	26,000	27/04/1981		
1981		Tasmania	16.12 (108)	Victoria	31.20 (206)	North Hobart Oval	Hobart	6,349	04/07/1981		
1981		Queensland	12.18 (90)	Victoria	32.29 (221)	Gabba	Brisbane	9,000	12/07/1981		
1980		Victoria	18.15 (123)	Western Australia	15.12 (102)	VFL Park	Melbourne	31,467	05/07/1980		
1980		Queensland	16.10 (106)	Victoria	28.18 (186)	Gabba	Brisbane	16,000	06/07/1980		
1980		Canberra	13.17 (95)	Victoria	11.16 (82)	Manuka Oval	Canberra	10,600	06/07/1980		
1980		Western Australia	21.30 (156)	South Australia	10.9 (69)	Subiaco Oval	Perth				
1980	SF1	South Australia	22.18 (150)	Tasmania	8.13 (61)	Football Park	Adelaide	10,666	11/10/1980		Seven
1980	SF2	Victoria	14.20 (104)	Western Australia	9.15 (69)	Football Park	Adelaide	10,666	11/10/1980		Seven
1980	3PF	Western Australia	17.23 (125)	Tasmania	12.18 (90)	Football Park	Adelaide	17,579	13/10/1980		Seven
1980	GF	Victoria	15.12 (102)	South Australia	12.13 (85)	Football Park	Adelaide	17,579	13/10/1980		Seven
1979		South Australia	6.13 (49)	Victoria	15.20 (110)	Football Park	Adelaide	32,054	21/05/1979		
1979		Tasmania	8.14 (62)	Victoria	26.21 (177)	North Hobart Oval	Hobart	12,197	18/06/1979		Seven
1979	S1 QPO	Tasmania	17.20 (122)	Queensland	13.12 (90)	Perth Oval	Perth	–	04/10/1979		Seven
1979	S1 SF1	Western Australia	23.33 (171)	Tasmania	9.10 (64)	Subiaco Oval	Perth	–	06/10/1979		Seven
1979	S1 SF2	Victoria	25.30 (180)	South Australia	20.15 (135)	Subiaco Oval	Perth	15,186	06/10/1979		Seven
1979	S2 GF	Queensland	23.13 (151)	Canberra	18.12 (120)	Leederville Oval	Perth	–	07/10/1979		
1979	S1 3PP	South Australia	22.20 (152)	Tasmania	17.11 (113)	Subiaco Oval	Perth	–	08/10/1979		Seven
1979	S1 GF	Western Australia	17.21 (123)	Victoria	16.12 (108)	Subiaco Oval	Perth	30,876	08/10/1979		Seven
1978		Tasmania	18.6 (114)	Victoria	25.11 (161)	North Hobart Oval	Hobart	16,776	10/06/1978		
1978		Victoria	25.13 (163)	Western Australia	8.15 (63)	VFL Park	Melbourne	45,192	10/06/1978		
1978		Canberra	12.11 (83)	Victoria	21.21 (147)	Manuka Oval	Canberra	10,300	11/06/1978		
1978		Western Australia	14.17 (101)	Victoria	17.13 (115)	Subiaco Oval	Perth	30,195	07/10/1978		Seven
1977		Western Australia	23.13 (151)	Victoria	8.9 (57)	Subiaco Oval	Perth	25,467	08/10/1977		Seven

=== AFL Women's State of Origin (2017) ===
After the success of the inaugural AFL Women's season the AFL announced in mid-July that a State of Origin representative match would be held for AFL Women's players during the AFL season pre-finals bye. A team of players born in Victoria played a single exhibition match against the Allies (a team of players from the rest of Australia) at Etihad Stadium on the evening of Saturday 2 September.

AFLW State of Origin
Saturday, 2 September (7:40 pm)	**Victoria**	def.	Allies	Etihad Stadium (crowd: 9,400)	Report
0.2.2 (14); 0.8.5 (53); 0.11.7 (73); 0.17.11 (113)	**Q1; Q2; Q3; Final**	0.1.1 (7); 0.2.2 (14); 0.2.2 (14); 0.2.4 (16)	Umpires: Bryce, Cheever, Rodger; Best on ground: Daisy Pearce; Television broadcast: Network Seven, Fox Footy
Super goals: Nil; Garner 5, Blackburn 3, Ashmore 2, Eva, Lambert, Paxman, Kearney, Pearce, D'Arcy, Hope	**Goals**	Super goals: Nil; Harris, Wuetschner
Pearce, Paxman, Donnellan, Garner, Eva, Kearney, Blackburn	**Best**	King, Bates, Antonio, Brennan, Marinoff
Lambert (hip)	**Injuries**	Harris (knee), Zielke (ribs), Randall (thigh), Bentley (knee)
Nil	**Reports**	Nil

=== AFL Hall of Fame Tribute Match (2008) ===
AFL Hall of Fame Tribute Match
Saturday, 10 May 2008 7:40 pm	**Victoria**	def.	Dream Team	MCG (crowd: 69,294)
3.6 (24); 9.8 (62); 14.9 (93); 21.11 (137)	**Q1; Q2; Q3; Final**	5.4 (34); 8.6 (54); 15.8 (98); 18.12 (120)	Umpires: Vozzo, Kennedy, Rosebury, McInerney; Allen Aylett Medal: Brendan Fevola (Victoria)
Fevola 6 J Brown, Johnson, Harvey 3 O'Keefe, Murphy, C Brown, Chapman, Bradshaw, Foley 1	**Goals**	Franklin 4 Davis 3 Motlop, Burton, Goodwin 2 Richardson, Kirk, S Burgoyne, Mooney, Stokes 1
Fevola, Foley, Pendlebury, Goodes, Harvey	**Best**	P Burgoyne, McLeod, S Burgoyne, Johncock
Fraser (knee)	**Injuries**	Kerr (lower leg)

=== AFL State of Origin for Bushfire Relief Match (2020) ===
State of Origin for Bushfire Relief Match
Friday, 28 February 2020 7:50 pm	**Victoria**	def.	All-Stars	Marvel Stadium (crowd: 51,052)	Report
4.1 (25); 10.2 (62); 15.7 (97); 24.10 (154)	**Q1; Q2; Q3; Final**	4.7 (31); 9.14 (68); 15.16 (106); 15.18 (108)	Umpires: Fisher, Stephens, Nicholls, Williamson; Best on Ground Medal: Dustin Martin (Victoria)
Papley 5 Kelly, Greene 4 Martin, Gaff, Bontempelli, Gresham 2 Dangerfield, J Cameron, Lynch 1	**Goals**	C Cameron 3 Coniglio, Breust, Riewoldt, Smith 2 Neale, Weller, Walters, Hill 1
Kelly, Martin, Greene, Papley, Pendlebury, Haynes, Cotchin, Dangerfield	**Best**	Coniglio, C Cameron, Mills, Cripps, Neale, Johannisen

== Other interstate matches ==
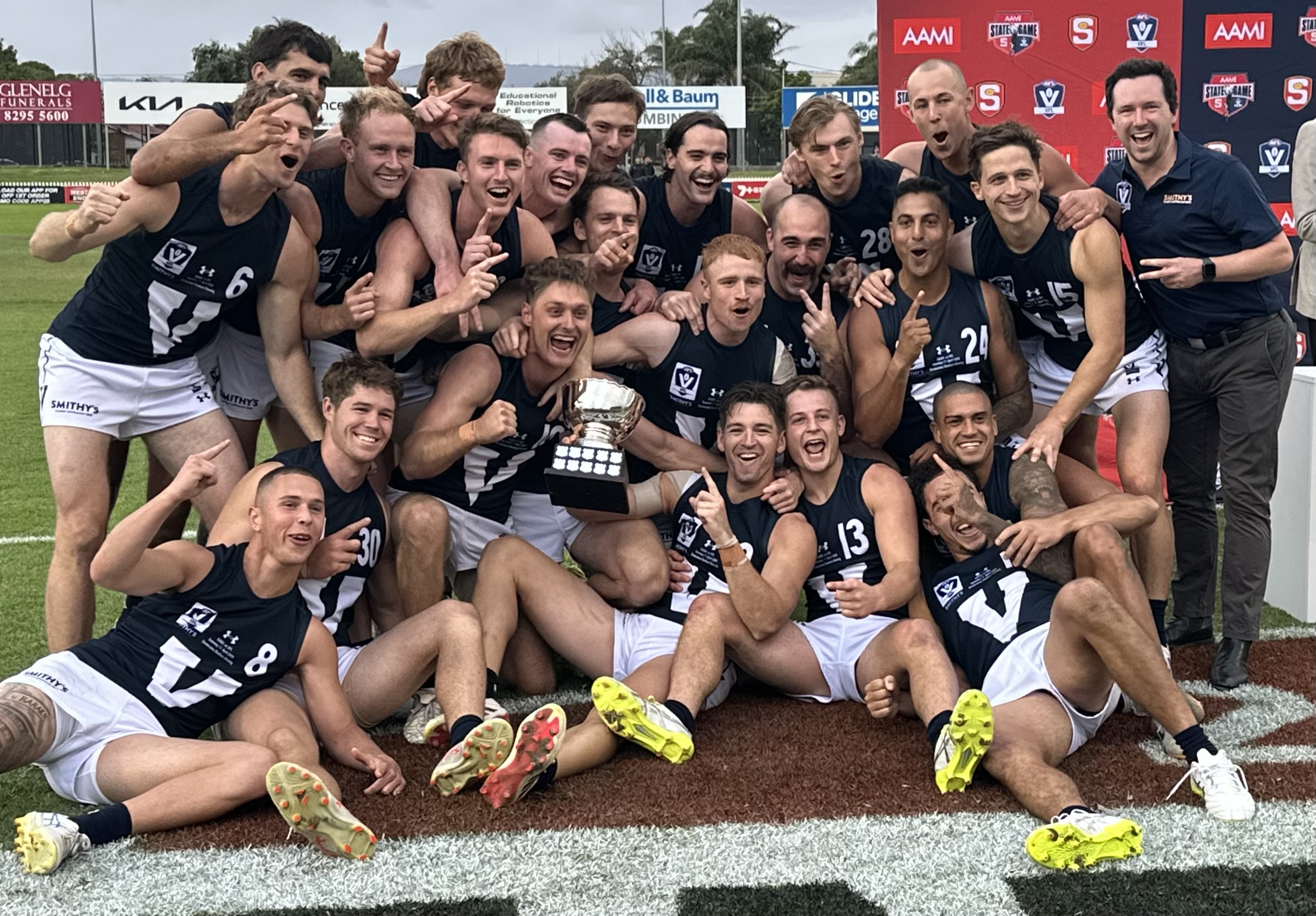
Players of the VFL following a win against the SANFL in 2026

=== State league representative matches (1990–present) ===
With the expansion of the Australian Football League into a national club competition, the individual state leagues from which interstate teams had been selected became second tier, reserves and feeder competitions. State leagues have competed against one another in representative contests since the early 1990s. These matches are league representative rather than state of origin, as players represent the league in which they presently participate.

==== Results (men's) ====
Bold text indicates the home team.

Year	Result	Venue
1991	**WAFL**17.20 (122) def. SANFL 11.12 (78)	Subiaco Oval
1992	**SANFL** 9.18 (72) def. WAFL 9.12 (66)	Football Park
1993	**WAFL** 15.20 (110) def. SANFL 13.8 (86)	WACA Ground
1993	**TFL** 11.8 (74) def. QFL 9.10 (64)	Bellerive Oval
1994	NTFL 15.13 (103) def. **VFA** 12.8 (80)	Victoria Park
1994	WAFL 10.14 (74) def. **SANFL** 7.18 (60)	Football Park
1994	**QFL** 18.18 (126) def. TFL 10.10 (70)	
1995	NTFL 11.11 (77) def. **ACTFL** 9.16 (70)	
1995	**TFL** 14.15 (99) def. SANFL 12.12 (84)	North Hobart Oval
1995	WAFL 14.14 (98) def. **QFL** 8.17 (65)	
1995	**VFA** 16.15 (111) def. NSWFL 2.7 (19)	
1996	**VFL** 15.18 (108) def. TFL 13.8 (86)	
1996	SANFL 15.20 (110) def. **WAFL** 6.9 (45)	Subiaco Oval
1997	SANFL 13.17 (95) def. **ACTFL** 8.5 (53)	
1997	VFL 11.25 (91) def. **ACTFL** 10.6 (66)	
1997	**TFL** 19.6 (120) def. WAFL 10.13 (73)	North Hobart Oval
1998	**SANFL** 17.13 (115) def. WAFL 10.10 (70)	Football Park
1998	**TFL** 13.10 (88) def. VFL 6.17 (53)	North Hobart Oval
1999	SANFL 12.11 (83) def. **VFL** 8.11 (59)	MCG
1999	ACTFL 9.11 (65) def. **NSWFL** 9.6 (60)	
1999	**WAFL** 20.12 (132) def. TFL 10.14 (74)	Sir Richard Moore Oval
2000	**SANFL** 15.17 (107) def. WAFL 8.17 (65)	Adelaide Oval
2001	**SANFL** 20.14 (134) def. VFL 14.12 (96)	Adelaide Oval
2002	VFL 18.17 (125) def. **SANFL** 10.9 (69)	Adelaide Oval
2002	**WAFL** 24.15 (159) def. QFL 6.12 (48)	Fremantle Oval
2003	SANFL 17.16 (118) def. **WAFL** 8.10 (58)	Fremantle Oval
2003	**QFL** 10.9 (69) def. ACTFL 5.13 (43)	The Gabba
2004	VFL 10.9 (69) def. **WAFL** 8.10 (58)	Leederville Oval
2004	QFL 10.11 (71) def. **ACTFL** 8.9 (57)	Manuka Oval
2005	SANFL 20.8 (128) def. **VFL** 18.16 (124)	North Port Oval
2005	WAFL 18.21 (129) def. **QFL** 11.5 (71)	Carrara Oval
2005	QFL 18.14 (122) def. **ACTFL** 12.12 (84)	The Gabba
2006	**SANFL** 14.14 (98) def. WAFL 12.9 (81)	Adelaide Oval
2007	**VFL** 25.11 (161) def. WAFL 5.12 (42)	North Port Oval
2007	**ACTFL** 16.11 (107) def. NSWFL 14.9 (93)	Manuka Oval
2007	QFL 13.7 (85) def. **TAS** 10.14 (74)	York Park
2008	**SANFL** 25.11 (161) def. VFL 14.12 (96)	Adelaide Oval
2008	WAFL 24.20 (164) def. **QFL** 14.7 (91)	Tony Ireland Stadium
2009	**WAFL** 12.10 (82) def. SANFL 12.9 (81)	Leederville Oval
2009	**TFL** 20.9 (129) def. QFL 11.14 (80)	Bellerive Oval
2010	VFL 20.11 (131) def. **WAFL** 11.11 (77)	Leederville Oval
2010	**QFL** 23.26 (164) def. TFL 13.7 (85)	Fankhauser Reserve
2011	**WAFL** 16.17 (113) def. NEAFL North 16.11 (107)	Rushton Park
2012	**SANFL** 15.11 (101) def. WAFL 13.9 (87)	Glenelg Oval
2012	VFL 20.17 (137) def. **TFL** 3.11 (29)	Bellerive Oval
2012	**NEAFL North** 31.15 (201) def. NEAFL East 8.8 (56)	Fankhauser Reserve
2013	**SANFL** 21.14 (140) def. NEAFL North 9.4 (58)	Richmond Oval
2013	**WAFL** 17.16 (118) def. VFL 15.11 (101)	Jubilee Oval
2013	TFL 15.11 (101) def. **NEAFL East** 8.13 (61)	Sydney Showground Stadium
2014	WAFL 19.18 (132) def. **NEAFL** 6.11 (47)	Blacktown ISP Oval
2014	SANFL 18.10 (118) def. **VFL** 14.12 (96)	North Port Oval
2014	**TFL** 18.12 (120) def. NEAFL 11.13 (79)	Bellerive Oval
2015	**WAFL** 18.13 (121) def. SANFL 11.10 (76)	Lathlain Park
2015	**NEAFL** 11.11 (77) def. TFL 8.9 (57)	Moreton Bay Central Sports Complex
2016	**SANFL** 16.10 (106) def. VFL 13.9 (87)	Adelaide Oval
2016	**WAFL** 25.14 (164) def. TFL 4.6 (30)	Bassendean Oval
2017	WAFL 20.14 (134) def. **VFL** 10.11 (71)	North Port Oval
2017	NEAFL 8.7 (55) def. **TFL** 5.8 (38)	Bellerive Oval
2018	WAFL 15.12 (102) def. **SANFL** 11.10 (76)	Adelaide Oval
2019	SANFL 16.4 (100) def. **WAFL** 13.15 (93)	Perth Stadium
2021	**SANFL** 20.10 (130) def. WAFL 11.11 (77)	Adelaide Oval
2022	SANFL 10.10 (70) def. **WAFL** 9.12 (66)	Perth Stadium
2023	**SANFL** 8.16 (64) def. WAFL 7.9 (51)	Adelaide Oval
2023	**TSL** 9.8 (62) def. QAFL 7.13 (55)	North Hobart Oval
2024	**SANFL** 10.5 (65) def. VFL 7.9 (51)	Glenelg Oval
2024	SANFL 16.13 (109) def. **WAFL** 5.16 (46)	Perth Stadium
2024	TSL 20.13 (133) def. **QAFL** 12.15 (87)	Bond Sports Park
2025	**SANFL** 15.13 (103) def. by VFL 18.6 (114)	Tanunda Recreation Park
2025	WAFL 13.8 (86) def. **SANFL** 8.8 (56)	Adelaide Oval
2026	VFL 15.13 (103) def. **SANFL** 14.14 (98)	Glenelg Oval
2026	**WAFL 14.14 (98)** def. SANFL 9.8 (62)	Leederville Oval

==== Results (women's) ====
As state leagues expanded in the late 2010s to incorporate women's football competitions, there became an opportunity for women's representative matches to be played. The first such contest was held between the WAFLW and SANFLW in 2024. As of April 2026, SANFLW have played in all matches of this kind and boast a 3–1 win-loss record.

Bold text indicates the home team.

Year	Result	Venue
2024	SANFLW 7.7 (49) def. **WAFLW** 5.3 (33)	Perth Stadium
2025	VFLW 9.9 (63) def. **SANFLW** 4.12 (36)	Alberton Oval
2025	**SANFLW** 6.5 (41) def. WAFLW 4.9 (33)	Adelaide Oval
2026	**SANFLW** 3.4 (22) def. VFLW 2.8 (20)	Glenelg Oval
2026	**WAFLW 15.9 (99)** def. SANFLW 1.1 (7)	Leederville Oval

=== E. J. Whitten Legends Game ===
Following the death of Ted Whitten Snr—who is regarded as one of the finest-ever players of Australian rules—from prostate cancer in 1995, his son Ted Whitten Jr organised an interstate charity match between teams of retired players to raise money for research into the disease. The two teams which take part in these games are Victoria and the All-Stars who represent the rest of Australia. The first E. J. Whitten Legends Game was played at Whitten Oval in 1996, and it has become an annual event. The games have often attracted crowds of over 10,000, and this has resulted in it being moved from the Whitten Oval to Optus Oval, to Adelaide Oval (South Australia) and finally to Docklands Stadium.
