= List of Western Australian State of Origin captains and coaches =

This is a list of players who captained and coached the Western Australian football team in State of Origin interstate matches, held between 1977 and 1998. State of Origin was introduced in 1977 to allow Western-Australia-born players in the Victorian Football League (VFL) to play for their origin state.

== Captains ==
A total of 15 different players captained Western Australia at State of Origin level:

#	Name	Club(s)	First	Last	P	W	L	D	W%
1	Graham Moss	Claremont	1977	1982	7	2	5	0	28.57%
2	Brian Peake	East Fremantle	1979	1987	9	5	4	0	55.56%
3	Noel Carter	South Fremantle	1981	1981	2	2	0	0	100.00%
4	Stephen Michael	South Fremantle	1982	1983	3	2	1	0	66.67%
5	Steve Malaxos	Claremont; West Coast	1984	1990	3	2	1	0	66.67%
6	Don Langsford	Swan Districts	1985	1985	1	0	1	0	0.00%
7	Ross Glendinning	North Melbourne; West Coast	1985	1988	3	0	3	0	0.00%
8	Maurice Rioli	Richmond	1987	1987	1	0	1	0	0.00%
9	Mark Watson	Perth	1988	1988	1	0	1	0	0.00%
10	Gary Buckenara	Hawthorn	1988	1989	2	0	2	0	0.00%
11	Chris Mainwaring	West Coast	1991	1991	1	1	0	0	100.00%
12	John Worsfold	West Coast	1992	1993	2	0	2	0	0.00%
13	Ben Allan	Fremantle	1995	1995	1	0	1	0	0.00%
14	Guy McKenna	West Coast	1996	1997	2	0	2	0	0.00%
15	Chris Waterman	West Coast	1998	1998	1	0	1	0	0.00%
16	Patrick Cripps	Carlton	2026	2026	1				

== Coaches ==
A total of 15 different people coached Western Australia at State of Origin level:

#	Name	First	Last	P	W	L	D	W%
1	Graham Farmer	1977	1977	1	1	0	0	100.00%
2	Ken Armstrong	1978	1978	3	1	2	0	33.33%
3	Barry Cable	1979	1979	3	2	1	0	66.67%
4	Brad Smith	1980	1980	4	1	3	0	25.00%
5	Mal Brown	1981	1988	6	3	3	0	50.00%
6	John Todd	1983	1988	10	3	7	0	30.00%
7	Ron Alexander	1986	1990	4	2	2	0	50.00%
8	Gerard Neesham	1988	1988	1	0	1	0	0.00%
9	Mick Malthouse	1991	1993	3	1	2	0	66.67%
10	Gary Buckenara	1995	1995	1	0	1	0	0.00%
11	Ross Glendinning	1996	1997	2	0	2	0	0.00%
12	Robert Wiley	1998	1998	1	0	1	0	0.00%
13	Dean Cox	2026	2026	1				

== See also ==
- List of Western Australian State of Origin players
