= Mark Naley =

Australian rules footballer (1961–2020)

Personal information
- Full name: Mark Brendan Naley
- Born: 11 March 1961
- Died: 6 July 2020 (aged 59); Adelaide, South Australia, Australia
- Original team: South Adelaide (SANFL)
- Draft: No. 4, 1981 interstate draft
- Debut: 1987, Carlton
- Height: 177 cm (5 ft 10 in)
- Weight: 80 kg (176 lb)
- Positions: Rover, Half-forward

Playing career^{1}
Years	Club	Games (Goals)
1980–1986, 1991–1993	South Adelaide	236 (231)
1987–1990	Carlton	65 (74)
Total		301 (305)
- ^{1} Playing statistics correct to the end of 1993.

Career highlights
- Premiership player Carlton Football Club 1987; All-Australian 1986, 1987; SANFL Magarey Medallist 1991; South Adelaide Best & Fairest 1984; 16 State of Origin games for South Australia 1981–89; Tassie Medallist 1987; Fos Williams Medallist 1991 SA v WA at Subiaco Oval; South Adelaide Reserves Premiership Player 1979; SANFL debut with South Adelaide in 1980; VFL debut with Carlton on 28 March 1987 v Hawthorn at Princes Park; South Adelaide Football Club Player Life Member; South Adelaide Football Club Hall of Fame member; South Australian Football Hall of Fame Inaugural Inductee 2002

Mark Brendan Naley (11 March 1961 – 6 July 2020) was an Australian rules footballer who played with Carlton in the VFL/AFL and South Adelaide in the South Australian National Football League (SANFL).

== Heritage ==
Growing up, Naley had been told that his paternal grandfather was of Afghan descent. This was to explain away the fact that some family members had darker than usual complexions. Later it came to light that in fact, Naley's grandfather, Charles Gordon Naley, was Aboriginal. Charles had served with the Australian Army at Gallipoli. Wounded and shipped to England for treatment, Charles eventually married his English nurse, Cecilia.

== Football career ==
Coming from Sacred Heart College, Naley joined the junior grades of South Adelaide and was a member of their 1979 SANFL Reserves premiership winning team before going on to make his league debut with the Panthers in 1980. He was a member of the State Youth Team that same year. While at South Adelaide, he earned All Australian selection for his performances in the 1986 and 1987 Interstate Carnivals, the latter also saw him win the Tassie Medal. He represented his state from 1981 to 1989, and again in 1991 and 1992. He also played for Colonel Light Gardens Football Club.

Naley moved from the state based South Australian National Football League to Victorian based VFL when he joined Carlton in 1987. He was a regular member of the side all season, finishing the year with a premiership. He also received 12 Brownlow Medal votes for the year, finishing equal 10th. In 1990 he suffered from hamstring problems and only managed 8 games, as a result he decided to return to his original club South Adelaide, winning the 1991 Magarey Medal before going on to retire in 1993.

In 2002, Naley was an inaugural inductee into the South Australian Football Hall of Fame.

== Non-football career ==
Naley was the owner of Mark Naley Building Services, a company that provides shopfittings for offices and commercial businesses.

He died from brain cancer on 6 July 2020, aged 59.
