= Graham Scott (footballer) =

Australian rules footballer (1946–2024)

Personal information
- Full name: Graham Lindsay Scott
- Born: 16 October 1946
- Died: 30 April 2024 (aged 77)
- Height: 185 cm (6 ft 1 in)
- Weight: 86 kg (190 lb)
- Position: Forward

Playing career^{1}
| Years | Club | Games (Goals) |
| 1966–1971 | South Fremantle | 117 |
| 1972–1973 | St Kilda | 18 (14) |
| 1974 | Melbourne | 8 (4) |

Representative team honours
| Years | Team | Games (Goals) |
| 1967–1971 | Western Australia | 5 (4) |
- ^{1} Playing statistics correct to the end of 1974.

Graham Scott (16 October 1946 – 30 April 2024) was an Australian rules footballer who played with St Kilda and Melbourne in the Victorian Football League (VFL) during the early 1970s. He also played for South Fremantle in the West Australian National Football League (WANFL).

Scott was a forward, playing mostly as a half forward flanker. He was used at full-forward in South Fremantle's premiership team of 1970 and kicked four goals in the Grand Final. His tally of 59 goals in the club's premiership year was enough to top their goal-kicking, as was his 97-goal effort in 1971. He represented Western Australia in five interstate matches, including some at the 1969 Adelaide Carnival. An older brother, Gary Scott, also played at South Fremantle.

In 1972 he left South Fremantle and joined VFL club St Kilda. He had a good debut, kicking three goals as St Kilda defeated Footscray at Moorabbin Oval. After another season at the Saints he crossed to Melbourne before retiring at the end of the year.
