= Meddings =

Meddings is a surname. Notable people with the surname include:

- Danny Meddings (born 1968), English squash player
- Derek Meddings (1931-1995), British film and television special effects designer
- Edgar Meddings (1923-2020), British bobsledder
- Kevin Meddings (born 1941), Australian rules footballer
- Richard Meddings (born 1958), British banker
