= Peter Steward =

Australian rules footballer

Personal information
- Full name: Peter William Steward
- Born: 27 January 1942 (age 84)
- Original team: Kerang
- Height: 191 cm (6 ft 3 in)
- Weight: 83 kg (183 lb)

Playing career^{1}
Years	Club	Games (Goals)
1962–1970	North Melbourne	126 (10)
1971–1975	West Perth	88 (12)
Total		214 (22)
- ^{1} Playing statistics correct to the end of 1970.

Career highlights
- West Perth Premierships 1973, 1975.; North Melbourne Team of the Century

Peter William Steward (born 27 January 1942) is a former Australian rules footballer who played for North Melbourne Football Club in the VFL from 1962 to 1970 and West Perth Football Club in the West Australian Football League from 1971 to 1975. He wore the number 15 his entire career.

A key defender originally from Kerang, Steward debuted for North Melbourne in 1962. In 1963, Steward underwent a knee reconstruction, the first player to do so, after his opponent Kevin Coverdale (playing for Hawthorn Football Club) had injured it. He kept out of the entire 1965 season after managing just one game in 1964. He returned in 1966 and two years later was at his peak, finishing equal 7th in the Brownlow Medal. The following season he represented Victoria in the 1969 Adelaide Carnival and earned All Australian selection.

When John Dugdale was injured during the 1970 season, Steward captained the club. It turned out to be his last year with them before he moved to play with West Perth. He was twice a premiership player at West Perth and represented Western Australia 5 times. During a 1968 match at Arden Street against Geelong football club, Steward was struck by a Geelong supporter with a "flogger" (a stick with streamers on the end of it), as he was about to kick the ball from the goal square. After this incident and burning of streamers at an Essendon Football club match against Collingwood football club at Windy Hill, Essendon in the early seventies; streamers were consequential banned. Steward played at Centre half back and Full back and was a prodigious kick of the ball and was one of North Melbourne's best defenders and during the 60's.

In 2003 Steward was named on the interchange bench in the North Melbourne's official 'Team of the Century'.
