= 1987 Australian Football Championships =

Australian rules football tournament

Tournament information
- Sport: Australian football
- Location: Adelaide and Perth, Australia
- Dates: 27 May 1987–22 July 1987
- Format: Round Robin
- Teams: 3

Final champion
- South Australia

The 1987 Australian Football Championships was an Australian rules football series between representative teams of the three major football states. Games involving Victoria were played under State of Origin rules, whilst the match between Western Australia and South Australia involved players based in their respective states at the time. The competition was won by South Australia.

== Results ==
=== Game 1 ===
| Home team | Home team score | Away team | Away team score | Ground | Crowd | Date | Time | Broadcast Network |
|---|---|---|---|---|---|---|---|---|
| South Australia | 12.13 (85) | Victoria | 11.15 (81) | Football Park | 41,605 | 27 May 1987 | | |

- E. J. Whitten Medal: Chris Langford (Victoria)
- Fos Williams Medal: Chris McDermott (South Australia)

=== Game 2 ===
| Home team | Home team score | Away team | Away team score | Ground | Crowd | Date | Time | Broadcast Network |
|---|---|---|---|---|---|---|---|---|
| South Australia | 18.16 (124) | Western Australia | 9.9 (63) | WACA | | 16 June 1987 | | |

- Fos Williams Medal: Andrew Jarman (South Australia)
- Simpson Medal: Chris McDermott (South Australia)

=== Game 3 ===
| Home team | Home team score | Away team | Away team score | Ground | Crowd | Date | Time | Broadcast Network |
|---|---|---|---|---|---|---|---|---|
| Victoria | 16.20 (116) | Western Australia | 13.14 (92) | Subiaco Oval | 22,000 | 22 July 1987 | | |

- Simpson Medal: Andrew Bews (Victoria)
- E. J. Whitten Medal: Greg Williams (Victoria)
- Tassie Medal: Mark Naley (South Australia)

== Standings ==
1987 Australian Championship
| Pos | Team | Pld | W | L | D | PF | PA | PP | Pts |
|---|---|---|---|---|---|---|---|---|---|
| 1 | South Australia | 2 | 2 | 0 | 0 | 209 | 144 | 145.1 | 4 |
| 2 | Victoria | 2 | 1 | 1 | 0 | 197 | 177 | 111.3 | 2 |
| 3 | Western Australia | 2 | 0 | 2 | 0 | 155 | 240 | 64.6 | 0 |

== Squads ==
South Australia

Coach: Graham Cornes

Both games

- Chris McDermott (Glenelg)
- Rudi Mandemaker (Hawthorn)

vs Victoria

- Matthew Campbell (Brisbane)
- Bruce Lindner (Glenelg)
- Tony McGuinness (Footscray)
- Mark Naley (Carlton)
- John Platten (Hawthorn)
- Andrew Rogers (Woodville)
- Steven Stretch (West Torrens)

vs Western Australia

- Michael Aish (Norwood)
- Greg Anderson (Port Adelaide)
- Peter Carey (Glenelg)
- Ross Gibbs (Glenelg)
- Harris
- Darel Hart (North Adelaide)
- Andrew Jarman (North Adelaide)
- Darren Jarman (North Adelaide)
- Clayton Lamb (West Adelaide)
- Bruce Lindsay (captain) (West Torrens)
- John Paynter (Glenelg)
- Michael Taylor (Norwood)
Victoria

Coach: Bill Goggin

Both Games

- Andrew Bews (Geelong)
- Russell Morris (Hawthorn)
- Gerard Healy (Sydney)
- Chris Langford (Hawthorn)

vs South Australia

- Doug Barwick (Fitzroy)
- Dermott Brereton (Hawthorn)
- David Glascott (Carlton)
- Paul Meldrum (Carlton)

vs Western Australia

- Robert DiPierdomenico (Hawthorn)
- Peter Foster (Footscray)
- Ray Jencke (Hawthorn)
- Wayne Johnston (Carlton)
- Simon Madden (Essendon)
- David Murphy (Sydney)
- David Rhys-Jones (Carlton)
- Brian Royal (Footscray)
- Paul Salmon (Essendon)
- Bernard Toohey (Sydney)
- Greg Williams (Sydney)
Western Australia

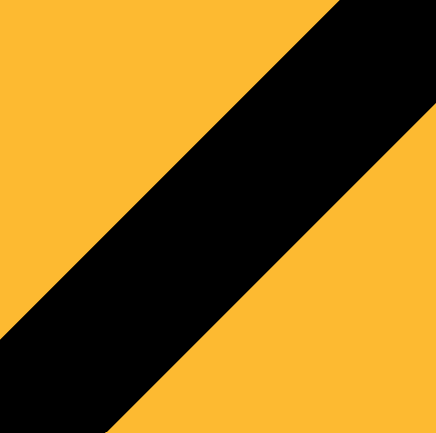

Coach: John Todd
Both Games

- Todd Breman (Subiaco)

vs South Australia

- Darren Bewick (West Perth)
- Clinton Brown (Subiaco)
- Clinton Browning (East Fremantle)
- Grant Campbell (East Perth)
- Shane Cocker (Subiaco)
- Steve Goulding (Claremont)
- Kim Hetherington (Claremont)
- Brent Hutton (Swan Districts)
- Derek Kickett (Claremont)
- Michael Lee (Subiaco)
- Guy McKenna (Claremont)
- Peter Menaglio West Perth)
- Noel Morton (Claremont)
- Brian Peake (captain) East Fremantle)
- Scott Rowland (Claremont)
- Peter Thorne (East Perth)
- Craig Turley (West Perth)
- Gavin Wake (West Perth)
- Colin Waterson (East Fremantle)
- Mark Watson (Perth)
- Greg Wilkinson (Subiaco)

vs Victoria

- Mark Bairstow (South Fremantle)
- Michael Brennan (East Fremantle)
- Richard Dennis (East Perth)
- Jon Dorotich (East Perth)
- Bill Duckworth (West Perth)
- Brad Hardie (Brisbane)
- Paul Harding (Hawthorn)
- David Hart (West Coast)
- Wayne Henwood (Sydney)
- Craig Holden (Sydney)
- Alex Ishchenko (West Coast)
- Laurie Keene (Subiaco)
- Jim Krakouer (North Melbourne)
- Rod Lester-Smith (Hawthorn)
- Chris Mainwaring (West Coast)
- Steve Malaxos (West Coast)
- Michael Mitchell (Richmond)
- Phil Narkle (West Coast)
- Murray Rance (Footscray)
- Maurice Rioli (captain) (Richmond)
- Peter Wilson (Richmond)
