= Max McMahon =

Australian rules footballer

Personal information
- Full name: Max McMahon
- Born: 20 March 1942 (age 84)
- Original team: Traralgon
- Height: 183 cm (6 ft 0 in)
- Weight: 84 kg (185 lb)

Playing career^{1}
Years	Club	Games (Goals)
1961–62	Hawthorn	5 (1)
1964–65, 67–70	Glenorchy	72
- ^{1} Playing statistics correct to the end of 1970.

Max McMahon (born 20 March 1942) is a former Australian rules footballer who played with Hawthorn in the Victorian Football League (VFL) during the early 1960s.

After being chased initially by Carlton, McMahon joined Hawthorn in 1961. A centre half back, he came from Traralgon and made his VFL debut in a win over North Melbourne at Arden Street in round four. Hawthorn went on to win their first ever premiership later in the year but McMahon made no further appearances that season. He appeared for Hawthorn four times in 1962 and spent the rest of his time in the reserves.

McMahon spent the rest of the decades in Tasmania, where he had a productive career. Apart from playing with Glenorchy, whom he won a 'Best and Fairest with in 1965, McMahon appeared for both the league and state in representative football. He was a Tasmanian representative at the 1966 Hobart and 1969 Adelaide Carnival. The defender also won a Lefroy Medal in 1965, the same year he was a member of Glenorchy's TANFL premiership team. He spent the 1966 season in the NWFU with Burnie and participated in another premiership. He is on the interchange bench in Glenorchy's official Team of the Century.
