= Terry Alexander (footballer) =

Australian rules footballer

Personal information
- Full name: Terry Alexander
- Born: 8 June 1944
- Died: 9 June 2013 (aged 69)
- Original team: Thornbury / Preston
- Height: 194 cm (6 ft 4 in)
- Weight: 92 kg (203 lb)
- Position: Ruckman

Playing career^{1}
Years	Club	Games (Goals)
1967–1969	Collingwood	28 (11)
- ^{1} Playing statistics correct to the end of 1969.

Terry Alexander (8 June 1944 – 9 June 2013) was an Australian rules footballer who played for Collingwood in the Victorian Football League (VFL) during the late 1960s.

Alexander, who was originally from Thornbury, played as a ruckman at Preston and represented the Victorian Football Association in the 1966 Hobart Carnival. He came to Collingwood in 1967, who were coming off a one-point Grand Final loss the previous season. Coach Bob Rose played Alexander in the forward pocket when he wasn't doing ruck-work. His last game for Collingwood was the Magpies' 1969 preliminary final loss to Richmond.
