= Rick Schoff =

Australian rules footballer

Playing career^{1}
| Years | Club | Games (Goals) |
| 1959–1971 | Sturt | 214 (151) |

Representative team honours
| Years | Team | Games (Goals) |
| | South Australia | 13 |
- ^{1} Playing statistics correct to the end of 1971.

Career highlights
- All-Australian team 1966, 1969; South Australian Football Hall of Fame inductee

Rick Schoff is a former Australian rules footballer who played 215 games for Sturt in the SANFL from 1959 to 1971.

Utility Rick Schoff played in a variety of positions during his career but was at his best at centre half back. It was there that he represented South Australia at the 1966 Hobart and 1969 Adelaide Carnivals, gaining All-Australian selection on both occasions. In all he played for South Australia 13 times.

In his early years, the heavily built Schoff was used up forward for Sturt and topped their goalkicking in 1961. He was soon moved to half back where he would spend most of his time and was a key member of their team which won successive premierships from 1966 to 1970. Schoff missed the 1966 premiership side through injury but played in the next four, as well as winning their 'Best and fairest' in 1968.

When Sturt named their official 'Team of the Century' in 2000, Schoff was put on a half back flank. The following year he inducted into the South Australian Football Hall of Fame.
