= Ted Lees =

Australian rules footballer

Personal information
- Full name: Edwin David Lees
- Born: 30 March 1948 (age 78)
- Died: 13 February 2020; Sydney, Australia
- Original team: University Blacks
- Height: 194 cm (6 ft 4 in)
- Weight: 99 kg (218 lb)
- Position: Follower

Playing career^{1}
Years	Club	Games (Goals)
1967–68	Melbourne	8 (8)
- ^{1} Playing statistics correct to the end of 1968.

Edwin 'Ted' Lees (born 30 March 1948) is a former Australian rules footballer who played with Melbourne in the Victorian Football League (VFL) during the 1960s.

Lees played for Assumption College alongside future Hawthorn star Peter Crimmins before joining the University Blacks. A follower, he was recruited to Melbourne in 1967 and appeared in the opening two rounds, but didn't play again that season. The following year he kicked three goals in games against both Fitzroy and Collingwood.

The next stage of Lees career took place in Tasmania where he played in the North West Football Union with Devonport. He was a member of Trevor Leo's Tasmanian team at the 1969 Adelaide Carnival.
