= John Goold =

Australian rules footballer (1941–2024)

Personal information
- Full name: John William Crosbie Goold
- Born: 27 June 1941
- Died: 31 May 2024 (aged 82)
- Original team: Healesville (YVFL)
- Debut: Round 7, 1963, Carlton vs. Footscray, at Western Oval
- Height: 187 cm (6 ft 2 in)
- Weight: 80 kg (176 lb)

Playing career^{1}
Years	Club	Games (Goals)
1963–1970	Carlton	108 (3)
- ^{1} Playing statistics correct to the end of 1970.

John William Crosbie Goold (27 June 1941 – 31 May 2024) was an Australian rules footballer who represented Carlton in the Victorian Football League (VFL) during the 1960s.

== Early life and education ==
John William Crosbie Goold was born on 27 June 1941. Originally from Healesville in the Yarra Valley of Victoria, Australia, he attended Melbourne Grammar School, as a boarder, for 11 years.

== Football ==
Recruited from the Yarra Valley Football League (YVFL) club Healesville, Goold was a half back and played in two Carlton premiership sides. The first in 1968 saw him line up at centre half back and the second came two years later in the 1970 VFL Grand Final which would be his last league game.

Goold represented Victoria at interstate football, including at the 1966 Hobart Carnival, where he earned All-Australian selection and finished second in the Tassie Medal voting. He also polled well in that year's Brownlow Medal, finishing in eighth place.

A fashion designer during his football career, which earned him the nickname "Ragsy", after he retired from football, Goold took up farming at a property in Ellerslie, Victoria, and became involved in horse-breeding, specifically polo ponies.

External videos
- John Goold - Carlton Football Club Past Player, Spirit of Carlton TV.
- CFC 150: 1960s - Goold, Hall and Collins, Carlton Football Club.
- Carlton Hall of Fame - John Goold, Carlton Football Club.
- "The Carlton Football Club" - John Goold's address to the Spirit of Carlton luncheon in 2008 (Part One), Spirit of Carlton TV.
- "The Carlton Football Club" - John Goold's address to the Spirit of Carlton luncheon in 2008 (Part Two), Spirit of Carlton TV.

== Personal life and death ==
Goold married Joanna Darling Baillieu in March 1968. Their son, Ed, played reserve grade football for Carlton from 1997 to 1998. John Goold died from cancer on 31 May 2024, in Camperdown, Victoria, at the age of 82.
