= Brian Sarre =

Australian rules footballer

Personal information
- Full name: Brian James Sarre
- Born: 27 December 1942 (age 83)
- Original team: Albany
- Position: Full-back

Playing career^{1}
Years	Club	Games (Goals)
1960–69	Subiaco	172
- ^{1} Playing statistics correct to the end of 1969.

Brian James Sarre (born 27 December 1942) is a former Australian rules footballer who played for Subiaco in the WANFL during the 1960s. He is the full-back in Subiaco's official 'Team of the Century'.

Sarre, originally from Albany, was eighteen when he made his Subiaco debut in 1960. He spent the rest of the decade as the club's full-back, although occasionally he would venture forward or play in the ruck. Sarre finished his career with 172 games but never once got to appear in a Grand Final. His brother John also played at Subiaco while their father had been a ruckman with Sturt.

He made twelve interstate appearances for Western Australia, the first of which came in 1963 when he won a Simpson Medal for his effort against the VFL's star forward Doug Wade. In 1966, at the Hobart Carnival, Sarre again performed well and was selected in the All-Australian team.
