= Morton Browne =

Australian rules footballer

Personal information
- Born: 11 September 1939
- Original team: University Blacks (VAFA)
- Height: 182 cm (6 ft 0 in)
- Weight: 79 kg (174 lb)

Playing career^{1}
Years	Club	Games (Goals)
1960–1967	Hawthorn	80 (107)
- ^{1} Playing statistics correct to the end of 1967.

Morton Browne (born 11 September 1939) is a former Australian rules footballer who played for Hawthorn in the VFL during the 1960s.

Browne usually played on the half back or half forward flanks and debuted for Hawthorn in 1960. He was a member of Hawthorn's inaugural premiership side in 1961, kicking 3 goals in the Grand Final. He didn't play at all in the 1963 season as he was studying law. Browne returned the following season however and in 1966 he represented Victoria at the Hobart Carnival.

Browne played with Melbourne University Blacks before joining Hawthorn. During undergraduate studies he penned a controversial Blacks report recommending the Blacks & Blues amalgamate, as it was originally. The report was not well received with the words referring to the Blacks was crossed out to prevent any unnecessary ill feeling. The next season two secretaries were appointed to better allow the committee dealing with known sources of friction with discretion.

His father, also called Morton Browne, played seconds football for Essendon in the late 1920s and early 1930s and one senior VFL game for Footscray in 1931

His younger brother Noel played with Hawthorn seconds before joining Sorrento in the MPFL (1964–67) where he played 54 seniors matches, including the 1966 grand final.
