= Brian Colbey =

Australian rules footballer

Playing career^{1}
Years	Club	Games (Goals)
1966–1976	Glenelg	210 (24)
- ^{1} Playing statistics correct to the end of 1976.

Brian Colbey is a former Australian rules footballer who played 210 games with Glenelg in the SANFL from 1966 to 1976.

Half back Brian Colbey played for Glenelg during a strong period for the club which saw them consistently contest the finals. He was a member of Glenelg's 1973 premiership, where they defeated North Adelaide in the Grand Final. A tough and uncompromising player, Colbey was also a regular South Australian interstate representative, taking the field for his state on 11 occasions. These included games at the 1969 Adelaide Carnival where he was selected in the All-Australian team as well as games at the 1972 Perth Carnival and 1975 Knockout Carnival.
