= Col Hebbard =

Australian rules footballer

Personal information
- Full name: Colin Edward George Hebbard
- Born: 10 November 1936 (age 90)
- Original team: Mount Hawthorn
- Height: 177 cm (5 ft 10 in)
- Weight: 73 kg (161 lb)
- Position: Half back/forward

Playing career^{1}
Years	Club	Games (Goals)
1957–61	Essendon	85 (24)
- ^{1} Playing statistics correct to the end of 1961.

Colin Edward George Hebbard (born 10 November 1936) is a former Australian rules footballer who played for Essendon in the VFL.

Hebbard, a West Australian, was recruited to Essendon from Perth club Mount Hawthorn. He shared his VFL debut with future star John Birt and participated in both Essendon's losing Grand Finals of 1957 and 1959. Over the course of his five seasons he played mostly as a half forward and half back.

After leaving Essendon he returned to Western Australia and began playing at West Perth. He made a total of 92 senior appearances for the club, some beside his brothers Neville and Robert. During the 1960s he represented Western Australia in six interstate matches, four of them in the 1966 Hobart Carnival.

After retiring as a player he continued to be involved with both West Perth and Essendon as a selector and recruiter.
