= Bob Lynch (footballer) =

Australian rules footballer

Personal information
- Full name: Robert Lynch
- Born: 15 April 1944 (age 82)
- Original team: Launceston City
- Height: 180 cm (5 ft 11 in)
- Weight: 80 kg (176 lb)

Playing career^{1}
Years	Club	Games (Goals)
1965	Fitzroy	9 (1)
- ^{1} Playing statistics correct to the end of 1965.

Robert Lynch (born 15 April 1944) is a former Australian rules footballer who played with Fitzroy in the Victorian Football League (VFL).

A centreman, Lynch started out at Melbourne where he played reserves football. He was picked up by Fitzroy in 1965 and played the first nine games of the 1965 VFL season, kicking his only goal in their loss to North Melbourne at Brunswick Street. He was then sent to the reserves to improve his unreliable disposal but wasn't able to make his way back into the seniors.

Lynch spent the rest of the 1960s with New Norfolk in Tasmania. He represented Tasmania at the 1969 Adelaide Carnival. The following season, Lynch joined Clarence, coached by St Kilda premiership player John Bingley.
