= Phil Lade =

Australian rules footballer

Personal information
- Full name: Philip Lade
- Born: 7 October 1946
- Died: 8 November 2005 (aged 59)
- Original team: Penguin
- Height: 183 cm (6 ft 0 in)
- Weight: 83 kg (183 lb)
- Position: Half back

Playing career^{1}
Years	Club	Games (Goals)
1966–67	Hawthorn	15 (0)
- ^{1} Playing statistics correct to the end of 1967.

Phil Lade (7 October 1946 – 8 November 2005) was an Australian rules footballer who played with Hawthorn in the Victorian Football League (VFL) during the 1960s.

Lade, a half back, was recruited to Hawthorn from Penguin in the North West Football Union. He played 14 of a possible 18 games in the 1966 VFL season but just one in 1967. He then returned to Penguin and represented Tasmania at the 1969 Adelaide Carnival.
