= 1966 Hobart Carnival =

Australian rules football competition

Tournament details
- Country: Australia
- City: Hobart
- Dates: 9–18 June 1966
- Format: Round-robin
- Teams: 5

Final positions
- Champions: Victoria (VFL)

The 1966 Hobart Carnival was the 16th edition of the Australian National Football Carnival, an Australian football interstate competition. It was the final time that Tasmania hosted a carnival.

It was competed by two Victorian sides, one from the Victorian Football League (VFL) and another from the Victorian Football Association (VFA), as well as South Australia, Western Australia and the home state Tasmania.

The VFL topped the ladder as the only undefeated team and Peter Hudson was the leading goal-kicker with 20 goals.

== Squads ==
=== Victoria (VFL) ===
Victoria (VFL) Carnival Squad
Coach: Alan Killigrew
Captain: Ken Fraser | Darrel Baldock | Bill Barrot | Ken Beck | John Birt | Barry Bourke | Norm Brown | Morton Browne | Ian Bryant | Neville Crowe | Michael Gaudion | John Goold | Graeme John | Stuart Magee | Hassa Mann | Denis Marshall | John Newnham | John Nicholls | Ted Potter | Ian Stewart | Noel Teasdale | Peter Walker | Terry Waters | Ted Whitten

=== WA ===
Western Australian Carnival Squad
Coach: Kevin Murray
Captain: Kevin Murray | Ian Abraham | Mal Atwell | Ken Bagley | Greg Brehaut | Mal Brown | Barry Cable | Tony Casserly | Derek Chadwick | Keith Doncon | Brian France | Col Hebbard | Bob Johnson | Fred Lewis | Cyril Litterick | John McIntosh | Bob Page | Norm Rogers | Brian Sarre | Gary Scott | Keith Slater | Bert Thornley | Bill Walker | Bob Whalley | Mel Whinnen

=== SA ===
South Australian Carnival Squad
Coach: Fos Williams
Captain: Neil Kerley | Brenton Adcock | Peter Anderson | Paul Bagshaw | John Cahill | Tony Clarkson | Robert Day | Roger Dunn | Ron Elleway | Ken Eustice | Tom Grljusich | Darryl Hicks | Geoff Kingston | Ron Kneebone | John Murphy | Robert Oatey | John Phillips | Jeff Potter | Don Roach | Brian Roberts | Bob Schmidt | Rick Schoff | Bob Simunsen | Alf Skuse | Bill Wedding

=== TAS ===
Tasmanian Carnival Squad
Coach: Trevor Leo
Captain: Graeme Lee | Roy Apted | Kevin Baker | John Bonney | Barry Browning | Berkley Cox | Brian Donohoe | Peter Fromberg | Dick Grimmond | Peter Hudson | John Kingston | Barry Lawrence | Len Lawson | Brian Lowe | Ron Marney | Kevin McLean | Max McMahon | Burnie Payne | Noel Raitt | Garth Smith | David Sullivan | Charlie Thompson | Ray Walker | Geoff Whitton | Graeme Wilkinson

=== Victoria (VFA) ===
Victoria (VFA) Carnival Squad
Coach: Perc Bushby
Terry Alexander | Peter Bedford | Brian Bibby | Ron Brown | Keith Burns | John Caulfield | Ted Crosher | Brian Dineen | Geoff Grover | Peter Howell | Norm Luff | Darryl McKenzie | Kevin Meddings | John Mickelson | John Nation | Alan Osborne | Alan Poore | Keith Robins | Fred Robinson | Colin Sleep | Peter Stedwell | Brian Trezise | Vasil Varlamos | John Walker | Bob Ware

== Results: Opening Day ==
Match One (Thursday, 9 June 1966)

- Western Australia: 3.10 (28) | 11.12 (78) | 20.14 (134) | 26.18 (174)
- Victoria (VFA): 1.0 (6) | 2.2 (14) | 4.5 (29) | 5.11 (41)

Attendance: 20,047 at North Hobart Oval (Double header)

Match Two (Thursday, 9 June 1966)

- Victoria (VFL): 5.6 (36) | 12.13 (85) | 21.21 (147) | 26.24 (180)
- Tasmania: 4.1 (25) | 7.2 (44) | 10.4 (64) | 11.13 (79)

Attendance: 20,047 at North Hobart Oval (Double header)

== Results: Day Two ==
Match Three (Saturday, 11 June 1966)

- Victoria (VFL): 1.7 (13) | 5.13 (43) | 11.17 (83) | 16.23 (119)
- South Australia: 1.1 (7) | 2.2 (14) | 3.7 (25) | 7.9 (51)

Attendance: 23,764 at North Hobart Oval (Double header)

Match Four (Saturday, 11 June 1966)

- Tasmania: 4.6 (30) | 6.13 (49) | 13.22 (100) | 19.27 (141)
- Victoria (VFA): 3.1 (19) | 4.3 (27) | 5.5 (35) | 7.11 (53)

Attendance: 23,764 at North Hobart Oval (Double header) *Ground Record

== Results: Day Three ==
Match Five (Monday, 13 June 1966)

- Victoria (VFL): 3.3 (21) | 7.7 (49) | 12.12 (84) | 14.17 (101)
- Victoria (VFA:) 1.2 (8) | 3.3 (21) | 6.6 (42) | 9.7 (61)

Attendance: 13,969 at North Hobart Oval (Double header)

Match Six (Monday, 13 June 1966)

- Western Australia: 1.3 (9) | 4.5 (29) | 7.7 (49) | 13.11 (89)
- South Australia: 2.4 (16) | 4.9 (33) | 8.13 (61) | 10.14 (74)

Attendance: 13,969 at North Hobart Oval (Double header)

== Results: Day Four ==
Match Seven (Thursday, 16 June 1966)

- Western Australia: 3.6 (24) | 8.8 (56) | 15.12 (102) | 17.13 (115)
- Tasmania: 5.2 (32) | 11.4 (70) | 13.8 (86) | 16.10 (106)

Attendance: 10,199 at North Hobart Oval (Double header)

Match Eight (Thursday, 16 June 1966)

- South Australia: 6.4 (40) | 8.8 (56) | 14.13 (97) | 21.20 (146)
- Victoria (VFA): 3.2 (20) | 5.7 (37) | 8.10 (58) | 9.11 (65)

Attendance: 10,199 at North Hobart Oval (Double header)

== Results: Final Day ==
Match Nine (Saturday, 18 June 1966)

- South Australia: 3.0 (18) | 7.3 (45) | 11.5 (71) | 14.7 (91)
- Tasmania: 1.3 (9) | 2.7 (19) | 4.9 (33) | 9.13 (67)

Attendance: 23,368 at North Hobart Oval (Double header)

Match Ten (Saturday, 18 June 1966)

- Victoria (VFL): 4.4 (28) | 6.5 (41) | 10.8 (68) | 15.10 (100)
- Western Australia: 5.1 (31) | 9.3 (57) | 11.3 (69) | 13.7 (85)

Attendance: 23,368 at North Hobart Oval (Double header)

== All-Australian team ==
In 1966 the All-Australian team was picked based on the Hobart Carnival.

1966 All-Australian Team Hobart Carnival
Name	State/League	Club
Brenton Adcock	South Australia	Sturt
Robert Day	South Australia	West Adelaide
Rick Schoff	South Australia	Sturt
Peter Hudson	Tasmania	New Norfolk
Graeme Lee	Tasmania	Launceston
Darrel Baldock	Victoria (VFL)	St Kilda (captain)
Ian Bryant	Victoria (VFL)	Footscray
Neville Crowe	Victoria (VFL)	Richmond
John Goold	Victoria (VFL)	Carlton
Graeme John	Victoria (VFL)	South Melbourne
Hassa Mann	Victoria (VFL)	Melbourne
Denis Marshall	Victoria (VFL)	Geelong
John Nicholls	Victoria (VFL)	Carlton
Ian Stewart	Victoria (VFL)	St Kilda
Noel Teasdale	Victoria (VFL)	North Melbourne
Barry Cable	Western Australia	Perth
Keith Doncon	Western Australia	East Perth
John McIntosh	Western Australia	Claremont
Kevin Murray	Western Australia	East Perth
Brian Sarre	Western Australia	Subiaco

== Tassie Medal ==
Western Australian Barry Cable won the Tassie Medal on eight votes, two clear of runner up John Goold.
