= Western Australia Australian rules football team =

Sports team

Western Australia

Team information
- Nicknames: Sandgropers; Black Swans
- Governing body: West Australian Football League
- First game
- (Victoria (state)) Victoria 14.10 (94) – 8.11 (59) Western Australia; 1904

The Western Australia Australian rules football team is the state representative side of Western Australia in the sport of Australian rules football which debuted in 1904.

Until 1977 it was represented by players of any origin playing in the state, despite being disadvantaged due to the high number of players who moved interstate for professional careers, it won titles in 1921 and 1961. After the eligibility rules were changed in 1977 to State of Origin rules, the team was the most successful of the State of Origin era (1977-1999) with four national titles. 2026 AFL Origin broke a 28 year hiatus for the team. The underage sides contest the underage men's (five division 1 titles) and underage women's championships.

Western Australia has a long and intense rivalry with Victoria. The 1986 game between Western Australia and Victoria is "regarded by many people as one of the greatest games – not just in State of Origin – but in the 150 years of Australian Football".

The team has been known as the "Black Swans" after the Black swan which is the state symbol emblazoned on their guernsey; however, they are more popularly known by their rivals as the "Sandgropers" after the West Australian insect, a nickname also more generally used for West Australians.

The side has been captained and coached by many West Australian greats. Brian Peake experienced the most state success as both longest serving captain and most capped player. John Todd was the longest serving coach, sharing the most titles with Mal Brown.

== History ==
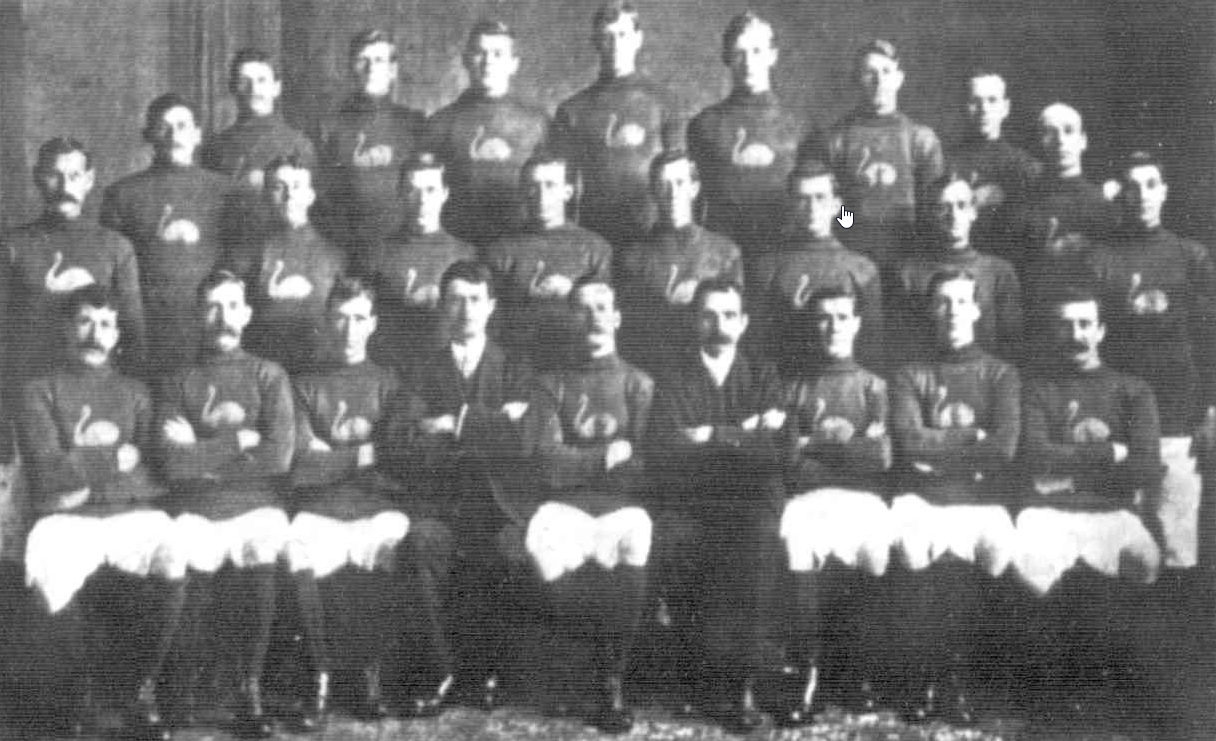
Jubilee Carnival squad 1908

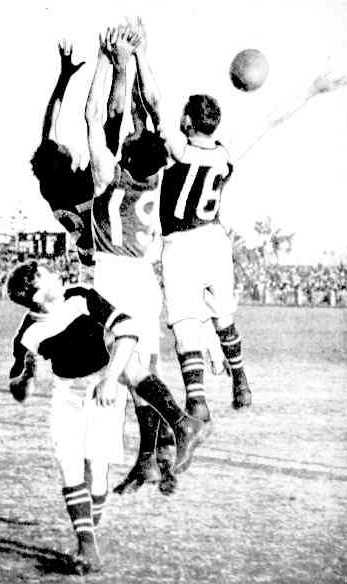
Western Australia 1921 national champions playing against South Australia at the national carnival

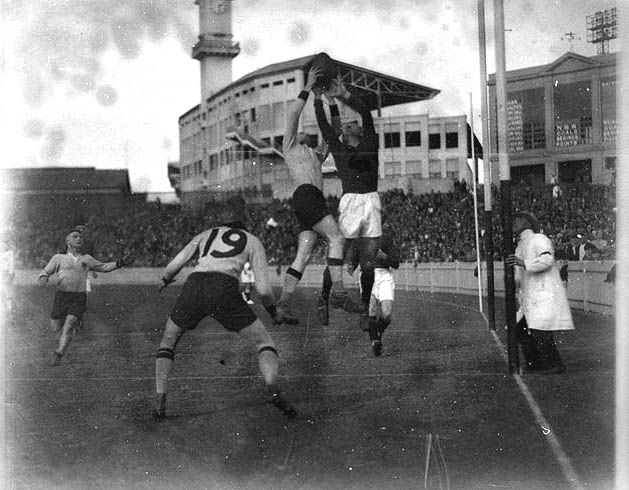
Western Australia competing against New South Wales in 1933 during the interstate competition at the Sydney Cricket Ground.

Western Australia played several interstate matches annually from 1904 until when State of Origin ended in 1999. Western Australia has participated in every Australian National Football Carnival, and always in section 1 when there were divisions. Throughout the majority of the team's history, its players came from the West Australian Football League. Between 1977 and 1999, West Australian players in the Victorian Football League played State of Origin football for the Sandgropers.

Western Australia has won three State of Origin Carnival championships. The 1980s were Western Australia's most successful period, winning the Australian Championship three times.

Western Australia won the historic first State of Origin game against Victoria in 1977 by 94 points. This game was a significant endorsement of the concept, as a Victorian team had defeated the West Australian team under the previous selection rules by 64 points in the same year.

== Rivalries ==
=== Victoria ===
Although Western Australia has a very strong rivalry with South Australia, the rivalry with Victoria is the state's strongest. Western Australia's rivalry stems from dislike coming from a number of reasons, like a feeling in Western Australia that Victoria never gave them the credit they deserve, despite some of the best players of all time coming from the state.

Some games widely regarded as some of the best in the history of Australian football were played between Western Australia and Victoria in the 1980s. Some include the games in 1986 and 1984, which were high scoring, with multiple high goal-scorers.

Leigh Matthews in a game against Western Australia knocked out Barry Cable with a high hit, at Subiaco Oval. The incident caused an enormous amount of angst in Western Australia.

The entire Western Australian team that won the 1961 Interstate Carnival was inducted into the Western Australian Hall of Champions, because they won a breakthrough carnival, which had been dominated by Victoria.

=== South Australia ===
Western Australia has an intense rivalry with South Australia.

== Carnival history ==
- 1908: 2nd
- 1911: 4th
- 1914: 3rd
- 1921: 1st
- 1924: 2nd
- 1927: 2nd
- 1930: 3rd
- 1933: 3rd
- 1937: 2nd
- 1947: 2nd
- 1950: 3rd
- 1953: 3rd
- 1956: 2nd
- 1958: 2nd
- 1961: 1st
- 1966: 2nd
- 1969: 3rd
- 1972: 2nd
- 1975: 4th
- 1979: 1st
- 1980: 3rd
- 1983: 1st
- 1984: 1st
- 1985: 3rd
- 1986: 1st
- 1987: 3rd
- 1988: 4th, Section 1
- 1993: 3rd, Section 1

=== AFL Under-18/Under-19 Championships ===
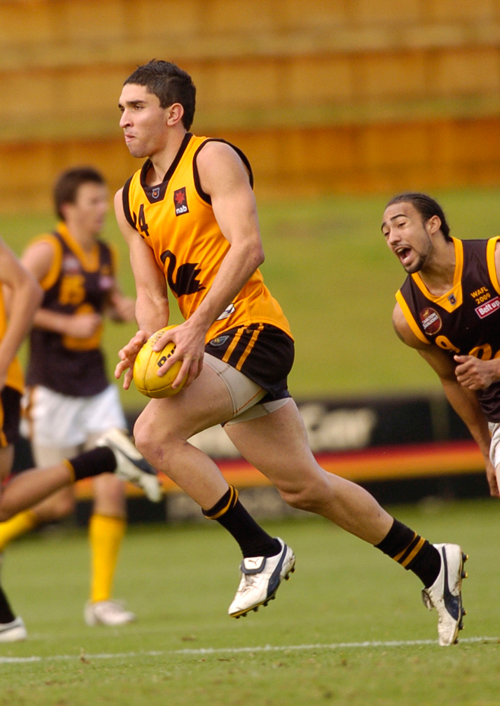
Anthony Morabito wearing WA's black swan guernsey at the 2009 AFL Under 18 Championships.

- 5: 1985, 1999, 2007, 2009, 2019

== Simpson and Moss Medals ==
The best player for Western Australia is awarded the Simpson Medal. The medal has been awarded since 1946. Between 1995 and 1998 the Graham Moss Medal was awarded to the best player from a Western Australian team.

== See also ==
- List of Western Australian State of Origin captains and coaches
