= Ian Bryant (footballer) =

Australian rules footballer

Personal information
- Born: 11 June 1942
- Original team: Footscray District
- Height: 178 cm (5 ft 10 in)
- Weight: 73 kg (161 lb)

Playing career^{1}
Years	Club	Games (Goals)
1960–1969	Footscray	160 (21)
- ^{1} Playing statistics correct to the end of 1969.

Ian Bryant (born 11 June 1942) is a former Australian rules footballer who played with Footscray in the VFL during the 1960s.

Bryant played mostly in the back pocket but was also used on the wing. He played in Footscray's losing 1961 grand final side. In 1966 he finished 9th in the Brownlow Medal count and was selected to play for Victoria at the Hobart Carnival where he earned All Australian selection.
