= Damien Nygaard =

Australian former athlete (born 1945)

Personal information
- Full name: Damien Patrick Nygaard
- Born: 24 May 1945 (age 81)
- Height: 178 cm (5 ft 10 in)
- Weight: 78 kg (172 lb)
- Position: Utility

Playing career^{1}
Years	Club	Games (Goals)
1964–1969	Norwood	96 (34)
1970–1971	West Perth	14 (4)
Total		110 (38)
- ^{1} Playing statistics correct to the end of 1971.

Damien Patrick Nygaard (born 24 May 1945) is a retired Australian athlete. He played 96 South Australian National Football League (SANFL) matches with Norwood and made three appearances for South Australia between 1964 and 1969. Nygaard is probably best remembered by most for his collision with Glenelg hard-man Neil Kerley in 1969 where he sustained a broken jaw.

He finished his Australian football career with West Perth, where despite being a much hyped recruit, he failed to live up to his expected promise. Despite this, Nygaard tried his hand at the American gridiron in 1974, as punter with the National Football League's Green Bay Packers, more than fifteen years before a more successful conversion by Darren Bennett.
