= Graeme Lee (Australian footballer) =

Australian rules footballer (1939–2021)

Personal information
- Full name: Graeme Justin Lee
- Born: 12 July 1939; Tasmania
- Died: 14 April 2021 (aged 81)
- Height: 178 cm (5 ft 10 in)
- Weight: 76 kg (168 lb)
- Position: Wingman

Playing career
| Years | Club | Games (Goals) |
| 1956–59 | Wynyard | 43 |
| 1961–62 | St Kilda | 18 (7) |
| 1963–67 | Launceston | 90 |
| 1968–75 | East Devonport | 127 |

Graeme "Gypsy" Lee (12 July 1939 – 14 April 2021) was an Australian rules footballer who played with St Kilda in the VFL during the early 1960s. He also had a noted career in Tasmania and is a half-forward flanker in Launceston's official "Team of the Century".

== Early life and career ==
Lee was born on the North West coast of Tasmania and started his career at Wynyard in 1956 as a wingman. Four years later he moved to the mainland when recruited by St Kilda. His three-year stint at St Kilda saw him manage just 18 senior appearances, with injury preventing him from taking a regular spot in the team.

== Return to Tasmania and State selection ==
When he returned to Tasmania in 1963 he joined Northern Tasmanian Football Association club Launceston and served as captain-coach. His fourth and final destination was East Devonport, where he remained a captain-coach and steered them to a rare premiership in 1968.

Amongst his 11 interstate appearances for Tasmania, Lee captained his state at the 1966 Hobart Carnival, where he finished equal third in the Tassie Medal and earned selection to the All-Australian team.

Lee was inducted into the Tasmanian Football Hall of Fame in 2005.
