= Ian Abraham =

Australian rules footballer (born 1941)

Personal information
- Full name: Ian James Abraham
- Born: 24 October 1941 (age 85)
- Original team: Won Wron

Playing career^{1}
Years	Club	Games (Goals)
1960–61	Collingwood	3 (4)
1961–65	Dandenong (VFA)	60 (46)
1966–67	Claremont (WAFL)	39 (19)
1968–71	Dandenong (VFA)	38 (18)
- ^{1} Playing statistics correct to the end of 1971.

Ian James Abraham (born 24 October 1941) is a former Australian rules footballer, who played with Collingwood in the Victorian Football League (VFL).

Abraham joined Collingwood from Won Wron at the start of the 1960 season. He made his debut versus Geelong in Round 11 that year, played the next week versus Fitzroy and kicked two goals in each match.

He was chosen for the first game of the 1961 season against Geelong but did not kick any goals and was not selected for Collingwood again.

== Sources ==
- Holmesby, Russell & Main, Jim (2007). The Encyclopedia of AFL Footballers. 7th ed. Melbourne: Bas Publishing.
