= Barry Cable =

Australian rules footballer and coach

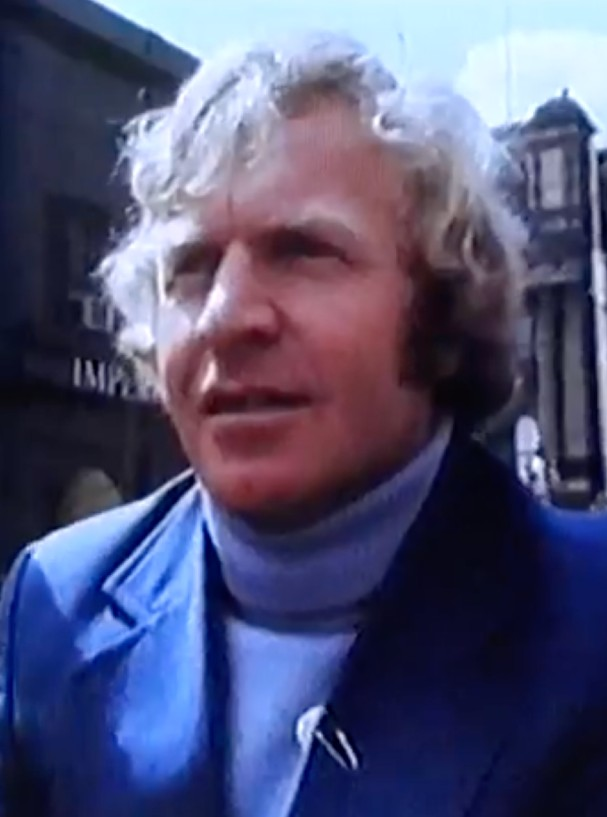
- Cable in September 1977

Personal information
- Full name: Barry Thomas Cable
- Born: 22 September 1943 (age 83); Narrogin, Western Australia
- Original team: Narrogin Imperials (UGSFL)
- Height: 168 cm (5 ft 6 in)
- Weight: 70 kg (154 lb)
- Position: Rover

Playing career^{1}
Years	Club	Games (Goals)
1962–1969, 1971–1973	Perth	225 (327)
1970, 1974–1977	North Melbourne	115 (133)
1978–1979	East Perth	39 (48)
Total		379 (508)

Representative team honours^{2}
Years	Team	Games (Goals)
1964–1978	Western Australia	20 (35)
1975	Victoria	1 (0)
Total		21 (35)

Coaching career^{3}
Years	Club	Games (W–L–D)
1972–1973	Perth	44 (19–25–0)
1978–1980	East Perth	68 (39–29–0)
1981–1984	North Melbourne	76 (40–36–0)
- ^{1} Playing statistics correct to the end of 1979.^{2} Representative statistics correct as of 1978.^{3} Coaching statistics correct as of 1984.

Career highlights
- Club: 2x VFL Premiership player: (1975, 1977); 4x WANFL Premiership player: (1966, 1967, 1968, 1978); 3x Sandover Medal: (1964, 1968, 1973); Syd Barker Medal: (1970); 7x Perth Best and Fairest: 1965–1969, 1971, 1973; 3x Simpson Medal: 1966–1968; Perth Captain: 1972–1973; North Melbourne Team of the Century (Rover); Representative: Tassie Medal: 1966; 2x All-Australian team: (1966, 1969); 2x Simpson Medal: (1969, 1977); Overall: ~~Sport Australia Hall of Fame~~ (rescinded in 2023); ~~Australian Football Hall of Fame, inducted 1996, Legend status 2012~~ (rescinded in 2023); ~~West Australian Football Hall of Fame – Legend Status~~ (rescinded in 2023); Indigenous Team of the Century (Rover and Coach); Coaching: National Football Carnival Championship: 1979; All-Australian team: 1979; WAFL Premiership: 1978

Barry Thomas Cable MBE (born 22 September 1943) is a former Australian rules footballer and coach. Considered one of the greatest rovers in the sport's history, he played 379 premiership games in the Western Australian Football League (WAFL) and the Victorian Football League (VFL), and later coached in both competitions.

However, his reputation was significantly impacted following allegations of historical child sexual abuse. This resulted in an unprecedented revocation of his Australian Football Hall of Fame status and his removal from the Sport Australia Hall of Fame in 2023, following an adverse finding in a civil sexual abuse trial.

In 2024, Cable was formally charged by Western Australia Police with multiple criminal counts of historical child sexual assault. Following a criminal trial in 2026, he was found not guilty on all charges.

Born in Narrogin, Western Australia, Cable made his senior debut with the Perth Football Club in the WANFL in 1962 and won the Sandover Medal as the competition's fairest and best player in 1964. He was awarded the Tassie Medal as the best player at the 1966 Australian National Football Carnival and earned selection in the All-Australian team. That same year, he played in the first of three consecutive premierships with Perth, winning the Simpson Medal as best on ground in each Grand Final, as well as a second Sandover Medal in 1968.

Cable left Perth at the end of the 1969 season to join the North Melbourne Football Club in the VFL. In his debut VFL season, he won the club's best and fairest award, the Syd Barker Medal, before returning to Western Australia. After another three years at Perth—during which he captain-coached the club in 1972 and 1973 and won his third Sandover Medal in 1973—Cable returned to North Melbourne for the 1974 season. Over the next four years, he played in two premierships (1975 and 1977) before returning to Western Australia to captain-coach East Perth. Cable retired from playing at the end of the 1979 season after sustaining severe leg injuries in a farming accident.

Cable returned to Victoria in 1981 to serve as the senior coach of North Melbourne, a position he held until 1984. He later worked as an assistant coach with the West Coast Eagles during their initial VFL seasons. Having represented Western Australia in 20 interstate matches during his playing career, Cable also coached the state team at the 1979 State of Origin Carnival, after which he was named coach of the All-Australian team.

His tally of seven best and fairest awards at Perth remains a club record. His career total of 379 premiership matches was an elite Australian rules football record until broken by Kevin Bartlett in Round 20 of the 1982 VFL season, and remains a record for any elite player born in Western Australia as of 2026.

Cable also played three pre-season/night series matches for East Perth and 21 interstate matches (20 for Western Australia and one for Victoria), along with one pre-season/night series match for North Melbourne; these are recognised as senior games by the WAFL but not the VFL/AFL. Including these matches, Cable played 404 senior career games, tied with Brian Peake for the most by any elite player born in Western Australia. The VFL/AFL lists Cable and Peake's totals as 403, excluding their VFL/AFL pre-season matches.

== Early life ==
The youngest of eleven children, Cable was born in Narrogin, a town in the Wheatbelt region of Western Australia. His father, Edward, was born in England and died when Cable was six years old. He was raised by his Indigenous mother, Dorothy, a member of the Noongar people of south-west Western Australia. Cable spent much of his childhood playing football; at age eleven, he was reprimanded by his school headmaster for devoting too much time to the sport. He made his senior debut for his local club, the Narrogin Imperials in the Upper Great Southern Football League (UGSFL), at age fifteen. After completing two years of a butcher's apprenticeship, Cable relocated to Perth to pursue a career in the Western Australian Football League (WAFL).

== Playing career ==
After being rejected by WAFL powerhouse East Fremantle for being "too small"—his height was listed as 168 cm (5 ft 6 in)—Cable signed with Perth in 1962. He began his career as a wingman, but late in the 1963 season was moved to rover. In his first full season in the position in 1964, Cable won the first of three Sandover Medals, the highest individual honour in the WAFL. He was awarded the Tassie Medal as the best player at the 1966 Australian National Football Carnival and earned selection in the All-Australian team. That same year, he played in the first of three consecutive premierships with Perth, winning the Simpson Medal as the best player in all three Grand Finals, as well as a second Sandover Medal in 1968.

=== North Melbourne (1970) ===
Cable's first coach at Perth, former Carlton premiership captain Ern Henfry, alerted Carlton to the talented young rover. In 1964, Carlton invited Cable to Melbourne and signed him to a "Form Four", tying him to Carlton for two seasons if he chose to play in Victoria. However, Cable had no desire to move interstate despite repeated urging from the club. For the next three seasons, Perth president Cliff Houghton forbade Cable from negotiating with VFL clubs. When this ban was lifted on 6 July 1969, Cable met with Hawthorn but declined to relocate. Later in 1969, North Melbourne secretary Ron Joseph flew to Perth to meet with Cable personally, successfully convincing him to play in Victoria. In August 1969, Cable signed a Form Four with North Melbourne, enabling his transfer to the Victorian Football League (VFL). Joseph stated that Cable was "genuinely interested in playing League football" and wanted to "prove himself in Victorian football".

When Cable moved to Victoria, North Melbourne was a struggling team, finishing last on the ladder in 1970. Despite the team's poor performance, Cable justified his reputation by winning the club's best and fairest award, the Syd Barker Medal, and finishing fourth in the Brownlow Medal count. However, North Melbourne was unable to meet a contractual clause requiring them to pay Perth $71,000 to retain his services permanently. As a result, Cable returned to Western Australia at the end of the season.

=== Perth Football Club (1971–1973) ===
Upon returning to Perth, Cable captain-coached the Perth Football Club during the 1972 and 1973 seasons, winning his third Sandover Medal in 1973.

=== Return to North Melbourne (1974–1977) ===
During Cable's absence, North Melbourne signed former Carlton premiership coach Ron Barassi and utilised the short-lived ten-year rule to recruit VFL stars Doug Wade, John Rantall, and Barry Davis. With players like Keith Greig and David Dench emerging as stars, Cable returned to North Melbourne for the 1974 VFL season. North Melbourne reached their first Grand Final since 1950 but lost to Richmond. In 1975, the Kangaroos broke through, defeating Hawthorn to claim their first VFL premiership. Following the death of his father-in-law at the end of the 1975 season, Cable considered returning to Perth. North Melbourne agreed to release him from his contract, but he opted to remain with the club. He went on to win a second VFL premiership with the club in 1977.

=== East Perth ===
Following the 1977 season, Cable returned to Western Australia after accepting an offer to captain-coach East Perth. In the 1978 WAFL Grand Final, East Perth defeated Cable's former club, Perth, by two points in heavy conditions to win their first premiership since 1972. It was Cable's sixth consecutive Grand Final appearance, having played in five with North Melbourne.

Having represented Western Australia in 20 matches during his playing career, Cable also coached the state team at the 1979 State of Origin Carnival, and was subsequently named coach of the All-Australian team.

== Coaching career ==
As a non-playing senior coach in the VFL, Cable achieved moderate success, guiding North Melbourne to the finals in two of his three full seasons in charge during the early 1980s. In 1983, he coached the team to the minor premiership, but North Melbourne lost both of its finals matches. In 1984, the club fell to second-last on the ladder, avoiding the wooden spoon only on percentage. Cable resigned as senior coach in September 1984, stating his long-term future lay in Western Australia.

From 1987 to 1989, Cable served as an assistant coach with the West Coast Eagles during their initial years in the competition.

== Life after football and honours ==
Cable and his wife, Helen, had two sons: Barry Jr. and Shane Cable, both of whom played in the WAFL for Perth and Subiaco. Shane also played one senior game for the West Coast Eagles in 1989.

Cable was made a Member of the Order of the British Empire (MBE) in December 1978 for "services to Australian rules football".

While playing for East Perth, Cable purchased a rural property in Orange Grove on the outskirts of Perth. On 25 October 1979, he was involved in a severe accident on the property when he lost control of a Massey Ferguson tractor while attempting to start it. His right leg was caught under the rear wheel, causing severe compound injuries. The tractor dislodged from his leg, drove into a nearby wall, and stalled. Cable remained conscious and called for help; a neighbour heard him and alerted emergency services.

Cable underwent emergency surgery at Royal Perth Hospital, where extensive foreign matter, including petrol, was cleaned from the wound. The following day, he held a brief press conference from his hospital bed. Secondary infections later developed, requiring intensive treatment and pain management. Once his condition stabilised, surgeons grafted muscle from his right hip to replace his right calf muscle and transplanted a vein from his lower left leg to create an artery for his right leg. Cable spent four months hospitalized and faced the possibility of permanent mobility impairment. Despite the injury, he continued as coach of East Perth for the 1980 season while undergoing extensive rehabilitation.

Cable was inducted into the Sport Australia Hall of Fame in December 1986. In 1996, he was an inaugural inductee into the Australian Football Hall of Fame, and in June 2012, his status was upgraded to "Legend". He was similarly inducted as a Legend in the inaugural West Australian Football Hall of Fame intake in 2004. In 1999, Cable established the Community Development Foundation, a non-profit organisation aimed at assisting schoolchildren from lower socio-economic backgrounds. A function room at Subiaco Oval, the Barry Cable Room, was also named in his honour.

Following civil court findings regarding historical sexual abuse in 2023, Cable's Legend status and membership in both the Australian Football Hall of Fame and West Australian Football Hall of Fame were rescinded.

In 1997, Western Australian Minister for Commerce Hendy Cowan appointed Cable to the newly formed Aboriginal Economic Development Council to assist in expanding economic opportunities for Indigenous Australians. Cable also participated in charity cycling events; in 1993, he rode across the Nullarbor Plain to toss the coin at the 1993 AFL Grand Final, and in April 1997, he led a ride from Mandurah to Bunbury to promote road safety.

In July 2007, Cable was retrospectively awarded a Simpson Medal for his performance in the inaugural State of Origin match in 1977, bringing his total to a record five Simpson Medals.

== Sexual abuse claims ==
In 2019, a woman initiated civil legal action against Cable, alleging he had sexually abused her between 1968 and 1973, beginning when she was twelve years old. The allegations had previously been investigated by WA Police in 1998 and referred to the Director of Public Prosecutions (DPP), but no criminal charges were laid at that time. Cable denied the allegations and made several unsuccessful legal attempts to have the civil case dismissed. His identity was made public in February 2023 after a suppression order was lifted prior to the trial.

During the civil proceedings in February 2023, a second woman came forward alleging she was sexually abused multiple times by Cable, which he categorically denied. A third woman also accused Cable of childhood sexual abuse, stating she had not reported him to police earlier because "all of Australia loved him." Over the course of the trial, two additional women testified that Cable had sexually assaulted them as children, bringing the total number of civil accusers to five.

In June 2023, Western Australian District Court Judge Mark Herron found in the civil case that Cable had engaged in grooming behaviour and had sexually abused the plaintiff over several years. The woman was awarded $818,700 in damages; however, reports noted it was unlikely she would receive the funds, as Cable had declared bankruptcy prior to the trial.

In response to the civil court findings, Cable was removed from the Sport Australia Hall of Fame in July 2023. He was subsequently stripped of his membership and Legend status in both the Australian Football Hall of Fame and the West Australian Football Hall of Fame. The North Melbourne, Perth, and East Perth Football Clubs also removed Cable from their respective halls of fame and rescinded his life memberships.

On 24 May 2024, following an investigation by WA Police, Cable was formally charged with five criminal counts of indecently dealing with a girl under 13 and two counts of unlawful carnal knowledge of a girl under 13. The charges related to alleged offences in 1967 and 1968 involving a girl who was nine or ten years old at the time. Cable pleaded not guilty to all charges on 30 May 2024.

Following a criminal trial in the District Court of Western Australia in early 2026, Cable was found not guilty by a jury on all seven criminal counts.

== Bibliography ==
- Ross, John (1999). The Australian Football Hall of Fame. Australia: HarperCollinsPublishers. p. 45. ISBN 0-7322-6426-X.
