= Graham Molloy =

Australian rules footballer

Personal information
- Born: 26 June 1947 (age 79)
- Original team: Norwood (SANFL)
- Height: 183 cm (6 ft 0 in)
- Weight: 85 kg (187 lb)

Playing career^{1}
Years	Club	Games (Goals)
1965–1969	Norwood	76 (73)
1970–1975	Melbourne	67 (35)
- ^{1} Playing statistics correct to the end of 1975.

Graham Molloy (born 26 June 1947) is a former Australian rules footballer who played for Melbourne in the VFL during the 1970s.

Molloy played most of his football on the ball but was also used at half forward. A left footer, he started his career in the SANFL with Norwood and starred for South Australia in the 1969 Adelaide Carnival, winning the Tassie Medal and earning All Australian selection. In 1970 he joined Melbourne in the VFL and remained there until 1975, playing a total of 67 games.
