= Peter Eakins =

Australian rules footballer (1947–1999)

Personal information
- Born: 16 February 1947
- Died: 4 July 1999 (aged 52)
- Height: 189 cm (6 ft 2 in)
- Weight: 86 kg (190 lb)
- Position: Defender

Playing career^{1}
Years	Club	Games (Goals)
1966–69, 1973	Subiaco	68 (12)
1970–72	Collingwood	32 (1)
Total		100 (13)
- ^{1} Playing statistics correct to the end of 1973.

Peter Eakins (16 February 1947 – 4 July 1999) was an Australian rules footballer who played with Collingwood in the Victorian Football League (VFL) during the early 1970s.

Eakins started his career in Western Australia at the Subiaco Football Club, making his debut in 1966. He was a good spoiler of the ball and had an exceptionally long kick. First selected to represent his state in 1968, Eakins became a regular at interstate contests and won a Tassie Medal for his performance at the 1969 Adelaide Carnival as well as getting selected to the All-Australian team as a centre half-back.

Collingwood recruited him soon after and he was a back pocket in their losing 1970 VFL Grand Final side. His time in Victoria was hindered by injuries and he returned to Subiaco after three seasons before retiring at the age of just 26.
