= Kevin Meddings =

Australian rules footballer

Personal information
- Full name: Kevin Meddings
- Born: 12 October 1941
- Original team: Yarraville
- Height: 183 cm (6 ft 0 in)
- Weight: 80 kg (176 lb)
- Position: Forward

Playing career^{1}
Years	Club	Games (Goals)
1962	Footscray	1 (0)
- ^{1} Playing statistics correct to the end of 1962.

Kevin Meddings (born 12 October 1941) is a former Australian rules footballer who played with Footscray in the Victorian Football League (VFL).

Meddings spent most of the 1960s playing for Yarraville in the Victorian Football Association but in the 1962 season played at Ted Whitten's Footscray. After getting his clearance, the full-forward made his first and only VFL appearance in a six-point loss to Essendon at Windy Hill. He represented the VFA at the interstate arena, most notably in the 1966 Hobart Carnival.
