= John Newnham =

Australian rules footballer

Personal information
- Born: 25 October 1942 (age 84)
- Original team: Ivanhoe Amateurs
- Height: 170 cm (5 ft 7 in)
- Weight: 70 kg (154 lb)

Playing career^{1}
Years	Club	Games (Goals)
1964–1971	Fitzroy	116 (89)
- ^{1} Playing statistics correct to the end of 1971.

John Newnham (born 25 October 1942) is a former Australian rules footballer who played with Fitzroy in the VFL.

Originally from Ivanhoe, Newnham was a rover and started his career well. He was Fitzroy's top vote getter in the Brownlow Medal in just his second season and finished runner up in their Best and fairest that year.

Newnham was a seven time Victorian interstate representative, with games at the 1966 and 1969 Carnivals.
