= Tassie Medal =

The Tassie Medal was awarded to the outstanding player at each Australian rules football Interstate Carnival or Australian interstate championship series held between 1937 and 1988 with the exception of the 1975 knock-out series.

The medal is named after Eric Tassie who was a South Australian football administrator who served with distinction on the Australian National Football Council.

Unlike with many other such awards, for example the Brownlow Medal, the word 'fairest' was never included in the description, meaning that reported players remained eligible to receive it.

Due to the demise of State of Origin football there hasn't been a carnival since 1988 hence the reason the award has not since been presented.

== Tassie Medal winners ==
Year	Winner	Team
1937	Deverick John (Mick) Cronin	Western Australia
1947	Les McClements	Western Australia
tie	Bob Furler	Canberra
1950	Terry Cashion	Tasmania
1953	Merv McIntosh	Western Australia
1956	Graham Farmer	Western Australia
1958	Allen Aylett	Victoria
tie	Ted Whitten Senior	Victoria
1961	Brian Dixon	Victoria
1966	Barry Cable	Western Australia
1969	Peter Eakins	Western Australia
tie	Graham Molloy	South Australia
1972	Ken McAullay	Western Australia
1979	Brian Peake	Western Australia
1980	Graham Cornes	South Australia
1983	Stephen Michael	Western Australia
1984	Brad Hardie	Western Australia
1985	Dale Weightman	Victoria
1986	Brad Hardie	Western Australia
1987	Mark Naley	South Australia
1988	Paul Salmon	Victoria
