= 1953 Adelaide Carnival =

Tournament information
- Sport: Australian football
- Location: Adelaide, Australia
- Dates: 8 July 1953–18 July 1953
- Format: Round Robin
- Teams: 5

Final champion
- Victoria

The 1953 Adelaide Carnival was the 12th edition of the Australian National Football Carnival, an Australian football interstate competition. It took place from 8 to 18 July at Adelaide Oval.

Home state South Australia was joined by the two Victorian teams Victoria (VFL) & Victoria (VFA), as well as Western Australia, Tasmania. Victoria (VFL) was the best performed side, finishing the carnival unbeaten.

A crowd of 52,632, then a record for an interstate game, attended the game between South Australian and Victoria which would decide the championship. South Australia, even though they had accounted for Victoria as recently as 1952, were no match on this occasion for their Victorian opponents and lost by 99 points. The VFA team performed admirably, defeating Tasmania and getting within 18 points of Western Australia and 33 points of Victoria.

Tasmania finished the carnival winless and had to play-off against the Australian Amateurs team in order to re-qualify as an elite team come the next carnival.

The youngest player at the carnival was 17-year-old Neil Conlan from Tasmania.

== Squads ==
Victoria (VFL)	South Australia	Western Australia	Tasmania	Victoria (VFA)
Coach: Frank 'Checker' Hughes	Bob Quinn	Clive Lewington	Len McCankie	
Bill Hutchison (Essendon) (c)	Bob Hank (West Torrens) (c)	Frank Sparrow (Swan Districts) (c)	Len McCankie (North Hobart) (c)	Norm Tindall (Oakleigh) (c)
Lance Arnold (Melbourne)	John Abley (Port Adelaide)	Ken Ashdown (West Perth)	Noel Atkins (Launceston)	Jim Bohan (Camberwell)
Jack Clarke (Essendon)	Dave Boyd (Port Adelaide)	Ken Caporn (Claremont)	Terry Cashion (Sandy Bay)	Kevin Boyd (Moorabbin)
Ron Clegg (South Melbourne)	Colin Brown (West Adelaide)	Don Carter (Subiaco)	Mike Clennett (Sandy Bay)	Gordon Duff (Camberwell)
John Coleman (Essendon)	Jim Coverlid (West Torrens)	Jack Clarke (East Fremantle)	Neil Conlan (New Town)	Ian Francis (Northcote)
Len Crane (Hawthorn)	Neil Davies (Glenelg)	Kevin Clarke (West Perth)	Lance Cox (New Town)	Don Fraser (Port Melbourne)
Fred Flanagan (Geelong)	Jim Deane (South Adelaide)	John Colgan (South Fremantle)	Joe Crawford (Devonport)	Len Gilder (Moorabbin)
Alan Gale (Fitzroy)	Brian Faehse (West Adelaide)	Keith Harper (Perth)	Charlie Dennis (Scottsdale)	Russell Grambeau (Prahran)
Ken Hands (Carlton)	Len Fitzgerald (Sturt)	Cliff Hillier (South Fremantle)	Darrel Eaton (Wynyard)	Ted Henrys (Preston)
Des Healey (Collingwood)	Tony Goodchild (Sturt)	Keith London (West Perth)	Rex Garwood (New Town)	Jim Hewes (Coburg)
Jack Howell (Carlton)	Lyle Griffin (North Adelaide)	Don Marinko (West Perth)	John Golding (Hobart)	Frank Johnson (Port Melbourne)
Ted Jarrard (North Melbourne)	Pat Hall (Glenelg)	Steve Marsh (South Fremantle)	Kevin Haas (Scottsdale)	Max Kruse Sr. (Prahran)
Neville Linney (St Kilda)	Lindsay Head (West Torrens)	Merv McIntosh (Perth)	Cec Hammer (Sandy Bay)	Keith McDonald (Coburg)
Bob McKenzie (Melbourne)	Brian Luke (Port Adelaide)	Laurie McNamara (West Perth)	Jack Hawksley (North Launceston)	Ken McFee (Camberwell)
Neil Pearson (Hawthorn)	Jack Lynch (West Adelaide)	John Munro (Claremont)	Arthur Hodgson (Ulverstone)	Bernie Miller (Port Melbourne)
Bruce Phillips (St Kilda)	John Marriott (Norwood)	Bernie Naylor (South Fremantle)	Les McClements (Clarence)	Tom Miller (Sandringham)
Bob Rose (Collingwood)	Bill McKenzie (North Adelaide)	Tony Parentich (South Fremantle)	Stan Walker (Ulverstone)	Reg Murray (Port Melbourne)
Des Rowe (Richmond)	Bob Proud (North Adelaide)	Wally Price (West Perth)	Jim Newton (Ulverstone)	Frank Neilsen (Brunswick)
Bernie Smith (Geelong)	Alf Roberts (West Torrens)	Geoff Rakich (Swan Districts)	Ashton Shirley (North Hobart)	Jack Rogan (Coburg)
Bill Stephen (Fitzroy)	Dick Russell (Port Adelaide)	Ray Schofield (West Perth)	Paddy Williams (Hobart)	Maurie Rolfs (Brunswick)
Charlie Sutton (Footscray)	Don Taylor (Glenelg)	Jack Sheedy (East Fremantle)	Terry Pierce (Latrobe)	Gil Savory (Oakleigh)
Jim Taylor (South Melbourne)	Clayton Thompson (Sturt)	Norm Smith (South Fremantle)	Ray Stokes (Burnie)	Harry Simpson (Williamstown)
Leo Turner (Geelong)	Norman Walker (Norwood)	Jim Spencer (East Perth)	Geoff Long (City-South)	Roy Stabb (Northcote)
Bill Wilson (Richmond)	Ray Whitaker (Port Adelaide)	Arthur Young (East Perth)	John Leedham (North Launceston)	Henry Taylor (Yarraville)
Roy Wright (Richmond)	Fos Williams (Port Adelaide)	Reg Zeuner (Perth)	Paddy Martin (Launceston)	Gordon Williams (Williamstown)

== Results ==
=== Qualifying ===
	Section A Play-Off
Sunday, 16 July 1951 (3.00pm)	Victoria (VFA) 20.17 (137)	def.	Australian Amateurs 12.12 (84)	Manuka Oval

=== Main Competition ===
	1953 Adelaide Carnival
Wednesday, 8 July (12:00pm)	Victoria (VFA) 11.18 (84)	def.	Tasmania 5.11 (41)	Adelaide Oval (crowd: 9,500 C-R)
Wednesday, 8 July (2:30pm)	Victoria (VFL) 13.15 (93)	def.	Western Australia 5.6 (36)	Adelaide Oval (crowd: 9,500)
Saturday, 11 July (11:45am)	Victoria (VFL) 22.20 (152)	def.	Tasmania 2.8 (20)	Adelaide Oval (crowd: 37,000 C-R))
Saturday, 11 July (2:30pm)	South Australia 19.24 (138)	def.	Western Australia 8.7 (55)	Adelaide Oval (crowd: 37,000)
Monday, 13 July (12:00pm)	Victoria (VFL) 16.13 (109)	def.	Victoria (VFA) 11.10 (76)	Adelaide Oval (crowd: 8,600 C-R))
Monday, 13 July (2:30pm)	South Australia 19.13 (127)	def.	Tasmania 17.15 (117)	Adelaide Oval (crowd: 8,600)
Wednesday, 15 July (2:30pm)	South Australia 16.8 (104)	def.	Victoria (VFA) 7.11 (53)	Adelaide Oval (crowd: 10,500)
Thursday, 16 July (2:30pm)	Western Australia 12.19 (91)	def.	Tasmania 5.7 (37)	Adelaide Oval (crowd: 3,500)
Saturday, 18 July (12:00pm)	Western Australia 12.8 (80)	def.	Victoria (VFA) 8.14 (62)	Adelaide Oval (crowd: 52,632 C-R))
Saturday, 18 July (2:30pm)	Victoria (VFL) 19.16 (130)	def.	South Australia 4.7 (31)	Adelaide Oval (crowd: 52,632)

=== Ladder ===
1953 Adelaide Carnival ladder
Pos	Team	Pld	W	L	D	PF	PA	PP	Pts
1	Victoria (VFL)	4	4	0	0	484	163	74.81	8
2	South Australia	4	3	1	0	400	355	52.98	6
3	Western Australia	4	2	2	0	262	330	44.26	4
4	Victoria (VFA)	4	1	3	0	275	334	45.16	2
5	Tasmania	4	0	4	0	215	434	33.13	0

Rules for classification: 1) points; 2) percentage; 3) number of points for.

== All-Australian team ==
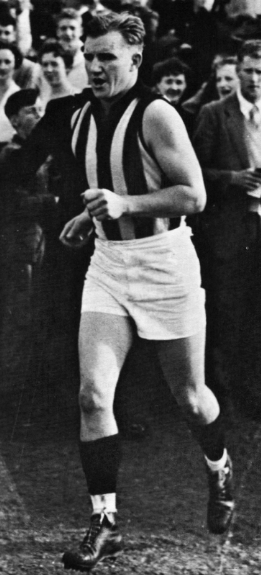
Bob Rose

The inaugural All-Australian team was named in 1953, based on the performances at the Adelaide Carnival.

1953 All-Australian Team Adelaide Carnival
Name	State/League	Club	Position
Neil Davies	South Australia	Glenelg	Half forward flank
Len Fitzgerald	South Australia	Sturt	Centre half back
Bob Hank	South Australia	West Torrens	Reserve
Jack Lynch	South Australia	West Adelaide	Wing
John Marriott	South Australia	Norwood	Forward pocket
Clayton Thompson	South Australia	Sturt	Centre half forward
John Leedham	Tasmania	North Launceston	Half back flank
Ted Henrys	Victoria (VFA)	Preston	Full back
Frank Johnson	Victoria (VFA)	Port Melbourne	Back pocket
Jack Clarke	Victoria	Essendon	Centre
John Coleman	Victoria	Essendon	Full forward
Des Healey	Victoria	Collingwood	Wing
Jack Howell	Victoria	Carlton	Ruck rover
Bill Hutchison	Victoria	Essendon	Rover
Bob Rose	Victoria	Collingwood	Half forward flank
Bernie Smith	Victoria	Geelong	Back pocket
Jack Clarke	Western Australia	East Fremantle	Reserve
Steve Marsh	Western Australia	South Fremantle	Forward pocket
Merv McIntosh	Western Australia	Perth	Ruck
Frank Sparrow	Western Australia	Swan Districts	Half back flank

== Tassie Medal ==
Ranking	Player	Votes	Team
1	Merv McIntosh	9	Western Australia
2	Bill Hutchison	5	Victoria (VFL)
2	John Leedham	5	Tasmania
2	Gil Savory	5	Victoria (VFA)

== Goalkicking ==
Ranking	Player	Goals	Team
1	Clayton Thompson	17	South Australia
2	John Coleman	15	Victoria (VFL)
3	Bernie Naylor	14	Western Australia
4	Bill Hutchison	12	Victoria (VFL)
