= 1956 TANFL season =

Australian rules football season

- Teams: Clarence Kangaroos; New Town Magpies; Hobart Tigers; New Norfolk Eagles; North Hobart Robins; Sandy Bay Seagulls
- Premiers: New Town
- Minor premiers: Nth Hobart

Attendance
- Matches played: 49
- Total attendance: 167,868 (3,426 per match)

The 1956 Tasmanian Australian National Football League (TANFL) premiership season was an Australian rules football competition staged in Hobart, Tasmania over fifteen (15) roster rounds and four (4) finals series matches between 31 March and 8 September 1956.

== Participating Clubs ==
- Clarence District Football Club
- New Town District Football Club
- Hobart Football Club
- New Norfolk District Football Club
- North Hobart Football Club
- Sandy Bay Football Club

=== 1956 TANFL Club Coaches ===
- John Golding (Clarence)
- Jack Rough (New Town)
- Bill Williams (Hobart)
- Rex Garwood (New Norfolk)
- John Leedham (North Hobart)
- Gordon Bowman (Sandy Bay)

=== TANFL Reserves Grand Final ===
- Sandy Bay 6.11 (47) v Clarence 5.7 (37) – North Hobart Oval

=== TANFL Under-19's Grand Final ===
State Schools Old Boys Football Association (SSOBFA)

- Buckingham 7.9 (51) v Glenorchy 7.5 (47) – New Town Oval

=== State Preliminary Final ===
(Saturday, 15 September 1956)

- New Town: 3.2 (20) | 8.3 (51) | 9.5 (59) | 10.10 (70)
- City: 1.3 (9) | 4.5 (29) | 5.7 (37) | 8.10 (58)
- Attendance: 7,350 at North Hobart Oval

=== State Grand Final ===
(Saturday, 29 September 1956)

- New Town: 1.5 (11) | 5.7 (37) | 8.10 (58) | 14.15 (99)
- Ulverstone: 2.8 (20) | 3.9 (27) | 6.11 (47) | 10.11 (71)
- Attendance: 7,692 at North Hobart Oval

=== Intrastate Matches ===
Jubilee Shield (Saturday, 28 April 1956)

- TANFL 8.12 (60) v NTFA 9.4 (58) – Att: 8,332 at North Hobart Oval

Jubilee Shield (Saturday, 26 May 1956)

- TANFL 18.12 (120) v NWFU 14.14 (98) – Att: 10,828 at North Hobart Oval

Jubilee Shield (Saturday, 23 June 1956)

- TANFL 12.11 (83) v NTFA 8.8 (56) – Att: 7,016 at North Hobart Oval

Jubilee Shield (Saturday, 21 July 1956)

- NWFU 15.10 (100) v TANFL 13.15 (93) – Att: 6,000 at Devonport Oval

Inter-Association Match (Saturday, 21 July 1956)

- TANFL 16.5 (101) v Midlands FA 12.6 (78) – Att: 2,062 at North Hobart Oval

=== Interstate Matches ===
See: 1956 Australian National Football Championships

Match Two (Thursday, 14 June 1956)

- Western Australia 14.19 (103) v Tasmania 11.14 (80) – Att: 11,000 at Subiaco Oval

Match Five (Tuesday, 19 June 1956)

- Tasmania 27.22 (184) v Victorian FA 12.12 (84) – Att: 11,957 at Subiaco Oval

Match Eight (Thursday, 21 June 1956)

- Victoria 22.19 (151) v Tasmania 14.5 (89) – Att: 9,400 at Subiaco Oval

Match Nine (Saturday, 23 June 1956)

- Tasmania 10.20 (80) v South Australia 8.19 (67) – Att: 42,000 at Subiaco Oval

=== Leading Goalkickers: TANFL ===
- Noel Clarke (North Hobart) – 80
- Ian Westell (Sandy Bay) – 59
- Joe Brown (New Norfolk) – 43
- Max Griffiths (New Town) – 40
- Rex Garwood (New Norfolk) – 37

=== Medal Winners ===
- Bob Lewis (Sandy Bay) – William Leitch Medal
- Lionel Churchill (New Town) – George Watt Medal (Reserves)
- Don Cranfield (Glenorchy) – V.A Geard Medal (Under-19's)
- Noel Clarke (North Hobart) – Weller Arnold Medal (Best TANFL player in Intrastate match)
- John Golding (Clarence) – Lefroy Medal (Best player in Interstate match)

== 1956 TANFL Ladder ==
| Pos | Team | Pld | W | L | D | PF | PA | PP | Pts |
|---|---|---|---|---|---|---|---|---|---|
| 1 | North Hobart | 15 | 12 | 3 | 0 | 1357 | 1036 | 131.0 | 48 |
| 2 | Sandy Bay | 15 | 10 | 5 | 0 | 1230 | 1099 | 111.9 | 40 |
| 3 | New Town | 15 | 8 | 7 | 0 | 1326 | 1210 | 109.6 | 32 |
| 4 | New Norfolk | 15 | 8 | 7 | 0 | 1113 | 1161 | 95.9 | 32 |
| 5 | Hobart | 15 | 4 | 11 | 0 | 1119 | 1289 | 86.8 | 16 |
| 6 | Clarence | 15 | 3 | 12 | 0 | 971 | 1401 | 69.3 | 12 |

=== Round 1 ===
(Saturday, 31 March. Monday, 2 April & Saturday 7 April 1956)

- Nth Hobart 15.12 (102) v New Town 10.13 (73) – Att: 6,127 at North Hobart Oval (31 March)
- Hobart 22.19 (151) v Clarence 10.11 (71) – Att: 5,906 at North Hobart Oval (2 April)
- New Norfolk 13.12 (90) v Sandy Bay 12.17 (89) – Att: 5,454 at North Hobart Oval (7 April)

=== Round 2 ===
(Saturday, 14 April 1956)

- Hobart 15.17 (107) v Nth Hobart 13.9 (87) – Att: 5,230 at North Hobart Oval
- Sandy Bay 19.21 (135) v New Town 7.9 (51) – Att: 2,527 at New Town Oval
- New Norfolk 12.17 (89) v Clarence 7.14 (56) – Att: 2,142 at Boyer Oval

=== Round 3 ===
(Saturday, 21 April 1956)

- Hobart 15.20 (110) v New Norfolk 9.13 (67) – Att: 3,866 at North Hobart Oval
- Nth Hobart 10.10 (70) v Sandy Bay 9.9 (63) – Att: 2,878 at Queenborough Oval
- New Town 12.18 (90) v Clarence 8.9 (57) – Att: 1,437 at Bellerive Oval

=== Round 4 ===
(Saturday, 5 May 1956)

- New Town 14.19 (103) v Hobart 12.23 (95) – Att: 4,077 at North Hobart Oval
- Sandy Bay 9.19 (73) v Clarence 9.8 (62) – Att: 1,465 at Bellerive Oval
- New Norfolk 12.10 (82) v Nth Hobart 11.8 (74) – Att: 2,332 at Boyer Oval

=== Round 5 ===
(Saturday, 12 May 1957)

- Nth Hobart 22.12 (144) v Clarence 13.4 (82) – Att: 2,453 at North Hobart Oval
- New Town 14.17 (101) v New Norfolk 14.10 (94) – Att: 3,697 at New Town Oval
- Sandy Bay 18.11 (119) v Hobart 12.13 (85) – Att: 2,832 at Queenborough Oval

=== Round 6 ===
(Saturday, 19 May 1956)

- Hobart 13.12 (90) v Clarence 14.5 (89) – Att: 2,411 at North Hobart Oval
- Nth Hobart 13.13 (91) v New Town 12.13 (85) – Att: 4,501 at New Town Oval
- Sandy Bay 12.12 (84) v New Norfolk 11.9 (75) – Att: 2,598 at Boyer Oval

=== Round 7 ===
(Saturday, 2 June & Monday, 4 June 1956)

- New Town 23.12 (150) v Sandy Bay 11.12 (78) – Att: 5,584 at North Hobart Oval
- Clarence 15.18 (108) v New Norfolk 9.10 (64) – Att: 1,608 at Bellerive Oval
- Nth Hobart 15.15 (105) v Hobart 7.12 (54) – Att: 6,298 at North Hobart Oval (Monday)

=== Round 8 ===
(Saturday, 9 June 1956)

- Nth Hobart 10.10 (70) v Sandy Bay 9.14 (68) – Att: 3,959 at North Hobart Oval
- Clarence 8.16 (64) v New Town 8.12 (60) – Att: 2,184 at New Town Oval
- New Norfolk 11.9 (75) v Hobart 10.14 (74) – Att: 1,482 at Boyer Oval

=== Round 9 ===
(Saturday, 16 June 1956)

- Nth Hobart 15.14 (104) v New Norfolk 6.8 (44) – Att: 2,094 at North Hobart Oval
- New Town 12.16 (88) v Hobart 12.10 (82) – Att: 1,659 at New Town Oval
- Sandy Bay 13.8 (86) v Clarence 11.11 (77) – Att: 1,886 at Queenborough Oval

=== Round 10 ===
(Saturday, 30 June 1956)

- Sandy Bay 8.9 (57) v Hobart 6.19 (55) – Att: 2,684 at North Hobart Oval
- Nth Hobart 14.13 (97) v Clarence 5.8 (38) – Att: 1,566 at Bellerive Oval
- New Norfolk 6.17 (53) v New Town 6.11 (47) – Att: 1,302 at Boyer Oval

=== Round 11 ===
(Saturday, 7 July 1956)

- Nth Hobart 14.13 (97) v New Town 9.16 (70) – Att: 4,780 at North Hobart Oval
- Sandy Bay 12.9 (81) v New Norfolk 10.14 (74) – Att: 1,770 at Queenborough Oval
- Clarence 7.12 (54) v Hobart 6.9 (45) – Att: 1,021 at Bellerive Oval

=== Round 12 ===
(Saturday, 14 July 1956)

- Nth Hobart 16.14 (110) v Hobart 12.7 (79) – Att: 5,179 at North Hobart Oval
- New Town 11.4 (70) v Sandy Bay 6.10 (46) – Att: 2,259 at Queenborough Oval
- New Norfolk 11.12 (78) v Clarence 6.8 (44) – Att: 1,432 at Boyer Oval

=== Round 13 ===
(Saturday, 28 July 1956)

- New Norfolk 12.13 (85) v Hobart 7.8 (50) – Att: 3,221 at North Hobart Oval
- New Town 26.17 (173) v Clarence 9.8 (62) – Att: 1,293 at Bellerive Oval
- Sandy Bay 11.14 (80) v Nth Hobart 9.8 (62) – Att: 2,422 at Queenborough Oval

=== Round 14 ===
(Saturday, 4 August 1956)

- New Town 14.18 (102) v Hobart 11.7 (73) – Att: 2,636 at North Hobart Oval
- Sandy Bay 13.15 (93) v Clarence 8.11 (59) – Att: 1,346 at Queenborough Oval
- Nth Hobart 11.10 (76) v New Norfolk 8.15 (63) – Att: 2,833 at Boyer Oval

=== Round 15 ===
(Saturday, 11 August 1956)

- Nth Hobart 9.14 (68) v Clarence 6.12 (48) – Att: 1,449 at North Hobart Oval
- New Norfolk 11.14 (80) v New Town 9.9 (63) – Att: 1,849 at New Town Oval *
- Sandy Bay 11.11 (77) v Hobart 7.7 (49) – Att: 1,142 at Queenborough Oval

Note: Final senior TANFL match staged at New Town Oval, New Town relocated to Glenorchy after this season, moving to KGV Park.

=== First Semi Final ===
(Saturday, 18 August 1956)

- New Town: 4.2 (26) | 8.6 (54) | 11.6 (72) | 13.10 (88)
- New Norfolk: 2.6 (18) | 5.9 (39) | 10.10 (70) | 11.11 (77)
- Attendance: 9,530 at North Hobart Oval

=== Second Semi Final ===
(Saturday, 25 August 1956)

- Nth Hobart: 6.5 (41) | 7.7 (49) | 8.9 (57) | 11.12 (78)
- Sandy Bay: 2.0 (12) | 4.3 (27) | 6.4 (40) | 8.5 (53)
- Attendance: 7,462 at North Hobart Oval

=== Preliminary Final ===
(Saturday, 1 September 1956)

- New Town: 3.2 (20) | 9.8 (62) | 13.6 (84) | 16.7 (103)
- Sandy Bay: 5.5 (35) | 6.5 (41) | 11.10 (76) | 13.16 (94)
- Attendance: 9,873 at North Hobart Oval

=== Grand Final ===
(Saturday, 8 September 1956)

- New Town: 3.1 (19) | 5.3 (33) | 6.7 (43) | 8.7 (55)
- Nth Hobart: 2.2 (14) | 5.2 (32) | 6.6 (42) | 7.10 (52)
- Attendance: 12,182 at North Hobart Oval

Source: All scores and statistics courtesy of the Hobart Mercury and Saturday Evening Mercury (SEM) publications.
