= Denis Scanlon =

Australian rules footballer

Personal information
- Full name: Denis Scanlon
- Born: 5 April 1954 (age 72)
- Original team: North Hobart
- Height: 188 cm (6 ft 2 in)
- Weight: 84 kg (185 lb)
- Position: Defender

Playing career^{1}
Years	Club	Games (Goals)
1976–81	Essendon	66 (7)
- ^{1} Playing statistics correct to the end of 1981.

Denis Scanlon (born 5 April 1954) is a former Australian rules footballer who played for Essendon in the Victorian Football League (VFL).

== Career and awards ==
Scanlon won North Hobart's 'best and fairest' award in 1973 and was a member of their 1974 premiership team. Although primarily a defender, Scanlon could also play as a ruckman and he was recruited to Essendon in 1976 for a record high transfer fee. From his debut mid-season, through the rest of the decade, he was a regular fixture in the side and made a finals appearance in 1979. He represented Tasmania at the 1975 Knockout Carnival and 1980 Adelaide State of Origin Carnival.

== Education ==
After completing a doctorate, Scanlon has worked as a medical researcher at the University of Melbourne.
