= All-Australian team =

All-star team of Australian rules footballers

Official 2023 All-Australian logo

The All-Australian team is an all-star team of Australian rules footballers, selected by a panel at the end of each Australian Football League (AFL) season. It represents a complete team, including an interchange bench, of the best-performed players during the season, traditionally led by that season's premiership coach.

The concept of an All-Australian team originated as recognition of performance in interstate football. They were named after each Australian National Football Carnival, beginning with the 1953 Adelaide Carnival. In the 1980s All-Australian teams were named annually to recognise the best performers in State of Origin series. Following the AFL's expansion to a national competition with teams in multiple states, the first AFL All-Australian team was named in 1991.

Despite the name's implication, the All-Australian team is usually ceremonial in modern times. Though the AFL played an All-Star match in 2020, it was the first in 12 years, and the difference in skill level between the All-Australian team and the nearest international competitor is currently too large for any contest to be competitive. Despite this, some of these players have represented Australia in AFL Academy junior teams up to the age of 18, as more than two-thirds of all AFL Academy representatives have gone on to play at senior AFL level.

From 1998 to 2004, the Australian international rules team was mainly composed of All-Australians, and from 2005 to 2013 the team for the annual International Rules Series was selected according to the quite different requirements of International rules football. This change was reverted ahead of the 2014 series, with any player who had been selected at least once in any All-Australian team being eligible for selection.

== History ==
The earliest concept considered to be a precursor to the All-Australian team was an annual team selected by Sporting Life magazine between 1947 and 1955. A panel of sportswriters at the magazine selected a full team of eighteen from all ANFC-affiliated competitions. For a time, AFL historians considered these teams to be official All-Australian teams, but no longer recognises them as such.

The first official All-Australian team was selected in 1953, immediately after the Australian Football Carnival, which was held in Adelaide on that occasion. Based solely upon performances at the carnival, the All-Australian team was selected by representatives of the various state teams. This tradition continued at all subsequent interstate carnivals until 1988.

In 1991, following the VFL's conversion to a national competition and its renaming as the Australian Football League (AFL), an annual All-Australian team based on performances during the AFL premiership season was introduced.

Since 1999, the All-Australian coach is the coach of the premiership-winning side that year.

Prior to 2007, only the final selections in the All-Australian team were announced. Since 2007, the All-Australian selection committee has nominated the 40 leading players of the year in their playing positions at the conclusion of the home and away season, before announcing the final 22 at a later date during the All-Australian Presentation Dinner. The squad was increased to 44 in 2022. The 2023 All-Australian selection panel consists of chairperson Gillon McLachlan, Kevin Bartlett, Eddie Betts, Jude Bolton, Nathan Buckley, Kane Cornes, Andrew Dillon, Glen Jakovich, Laura Kane, Cameron Ling, and Matthew Pavlich.

In addition to the senior All-Australian team, each year an All-Australian line-up is announced based on the AFL National Under 18 Championships and the AFL National Under 16 Championships. The following lists are for senior teams only.

Members of the All-Australian team are awarded a team blazer, reminiscent of the formal wear traditionally worn by travelling members of national sports teams. Blazers have become synonymous with the identity of the honour.

== Teams ==
=== AFL era: 1991–present ===
==== 2026 ====
2026 All-Australian team
B:	Wayne Milera (Adelaide)	Callum Wilkie (St Kilda)	Jarman Impey (Hawthorn)
HB:	Lachie Ash (Greater Western Sydney)	Harris Andrews (Brisbane Lions)	Jordan Clark (Fremantle)
C:	Bailey Smith (Geelong)	Marcus Bontempelli (Western Bulldogs)	Ollie Dempsey (Geelong)
HF:	Shai Bolton (Fremantle)	Josh Treacy (Fremantle)	Kysaiah Pickett (Melbourne)
F:	Nick Watson (Hawthorn)	Charlie Curnow (Sydney)	Logan Morris (Brisbane Lions)
Foll:	Max Gawn (Melbourne) (captain)	Jordan Dawson (Adelaide) (vice-captain)	Nick Daicos (Collingwood)
Int:	Luke Jackson (Fremantle)	Nasiah Wanganeen-Milera (St Kilda)	Murphy Reid (Fremantle)
Int:	Zac Bailey (Brisbane Lions)	Zak Butters (Port Adelaide)	
Coach:	Chris Fagan (Brisbane Lions)		

==== 2025 ====
2025 All-Australian team
B:	Josh Battle (Hawthorn)	Sam Taylor (Greater Western Sydney)	Jordan Clark (Fremantle)
HB:	Bailey Dale (Western Bulldogs)	Harris Andrews (Brisbane Lions)	Nasiah Wanganeen-Milera (St Kilda)
C:	Bailey Smith (Geelong)	Jordan Dawson (Adelaide) (vice-captain)	Hugh McCluggage (Brisbane Lions)
HF:	Isaac Heeney (Sydney)	Jeremy Cameron (Geelong) (captain)	Zac Bailey (Brisbane Lions)
F:	Jack Gunston (Hawthorn)	Riley Thilthorpe (Adelaide)	Kysaiah Pickett (Melbourne)
Foll:	Max Gawn (Melbourne)	Noah Anderson (Gold Coast)	Ed Richards (Western Bulldogs)
Int:	Marcus Bontempelli (Western Bulldogs)	Caleb Serong (Fremantle)	Matt Rowell (Gold Coast)
Int:	Nick Daicos (Collingwood)		
Coach:	Chris Fagan (Brisbane Lions)		

==== 2024 ====
2024 All-Australian team
B:	Nick Blakey (Sydney)	Jacob Weitering (Carlton)	Luke Ryan (Fremantle)
HB:	Dayne Zorko (Brisbane Lions)	Jeremy McGovern (West Coast)	Dan Houston (Port Adelaide)
C:	Errol Gulden (Sydney)	Marcus Bontempelli (Western Bulldogs) (captain)	Nick Daicos (Collingwood)
HF:	Chad Warner (Sydney)	Jeremy Cameron (Geelong)	Isaac Heeney (Sydney)
F:	Jake Waterman (West Coast)	Jesse Hogan (Greater Western Sydney)	Dylan Moore (Hawthorn)
Foll:	Max Gawn (Melbourne)	Patrick Cripps (Carlton) (vice-captain)	Caleb Serong (Fremantle)
Int:	Lachie Whitfield (Greater Western Sydney)	Lachie Neale (Brisbane Lions)	Adam Treloar (Western Bulldogs)
Int:	Zak Butters (Port Adelaide)		
Coach:	Chris Fagan (Brisbane Lions)		

==== 2023 ====
2023 All-Australian team
B:	James Sicily (Hawthorn)	Callum Wilkie (St Kilda)	Tom Stewart (Geelong)
HB:	Jack Sinclair (St Kilda)	Darcy Moore (Collingwood)	Dan Houston (Port Adelaide)
C:	Errol Gulden (Sydney)	Marcus Bontempelli (Western Bulldogs) (vice-captain)	Josh Daicos (Collingwood)
HF:	Connor Rozee (Port Adelaide)	Taylor Walker (Adelaide)	Christian Petracca (Melbourne)
F:	Charlie Cameron (Brisbane Lions)	Charlie Curnow (Carlton)	Toby Greene (Greater Western Sydney) (captain)
Foll:	Tim English (Western Bulldogs)	Zak Butters (Port Adelaide)	Nick Daicos (Collingwood)
Int:	Jordan Dawson (Adelaide)	Nick Larkey (North Melbourne)	Zach Merrett (Essendon)
Int:	Caleb Serong (Fremantle)		
Coach:	Craig McRae (Collingwood)		

Notes:

- Despite winning the Brownlow Medal for the second time, Lachie Neale was not selected in the team, but was included in the initial 44 man squad.

==== 2022 ====
2022 All-Australian team
B:	Tom Stewart (Geelong)	Steven May (Melbourne)	Brayden Maynard (Collingwood)
HB:	Jack Sinclair (St Kilda)	Sam Taylor (Greater Western Sydney)	Adam Saad (Carlton)
C:	Touk Miller (Gold Coast)	Clayton Oliver (Melbourne)	Callum Mills (Sydney)
HF:	Christian Petracca (Melbourne)	Jeremy Cameron (Geelong)	Shai Bolton (Richmond)
F:	Charlie Curnow (Carlton)	Tom Hawkins (Geelong) (captain)	Tyson Stengle (Geelong)
Foll:	Max Gawn (Melbourne)	Patrick Cripps (Carlton) (vice-captain)	Lachie Neale (Brisbane Lions)
Int:	Mark Blicavs (Geelong)	Andrew Brayshaw (Fremantle)	Isaac Heeney (Sydney)
Int:	Connor Rozee (Port Adelaide)		
Coach:	Chris Scott (Geelong)		

==== 2021 ====
2021 All-Australian team
B:	Jake Lever (Melbourne)	Steven May (Melbourne)	Tom Stewart (Geelong)
HB:	Daniel Rich (Brisbane Lions)	Aliir Aliir (Port Adelaide)	Bailey Dale (Western Bulldogs)
C:	Zach Merrett (Essendon)	Ollie Wines (Port Adelaide)	Sam Walsh (Carlton)
HF:	Marcus Bontempelli (Western Bulldogs) (vice-captain)	Tom Hawkins (Geelong)	Christian Petracca (Melbourne)
F:	Toby Greene (Greater Western Sydney)	Harry McKay (Carlton)	Tom Papley (Sydney)
Foll:	Max Gawn (Melbourne) (captain)	Jack Macrae (Western Bulldogs)	Clayton Oliver (Melbourne)
Int:	Darcy Parish (Essendon)	Nic Naitanui (West Coast)	Touk Miller (Gold Coast)
Int:	Jack Steele (St Kilda)		
Coach:	Simon Goodwin (Melbourne)		

==== 2020 ====
2020 All-Australian team
B:	Brad Sheppard (West Coast)	Harris Andrews (Brisbane Lions)	Luke Ryan (Fremantle)
HB:	Nick Haynes (Greater Western Sydney)	Darcy Moore (Collingwood)	Darcy Byrne-Jones (Port Adelaide)
C:	Jack Macrae (Western Bulldogs)	Travis Boak (Port Adelaide) (vice-captain)	Cameron Guthrie (Geelong)
HF:	Patrick Dangerfield (Geelong) (captain)	Charlie Dixon (Port Adelaide)	Marcus Bontempelli (Western Bulldogs)
F:	Liam Ryan (West Coast)	Tom Hawkins (Geelong)	Dustin Martin (Richmond)
Foll:	Nic Naitanui (West Coast)	Christian Petracca (Melbourne)	Lachie Neale (Brisbane Lions)
Int:	Jack Steele (St Kilda)	Taylor Adams (Collingwood)	Caleb Daniel (Western Bulldogs)
Int:	Max Gawn (Melbourne)		
Coach:	Damien Hardwick (Richmond)		

==== 2019 ====
2019 All-Australian team
B:	Tom Stewart (Geelong)	Harris Andrews (Brisbane Lions)	Dylan Grimes (Richmond)
HB:	Bachar Houli (Richmond)	Jeremy McGovern (West Coast)	Shannon Hurn (West Coast) (vice-captain)
C:	Marcus Bontempelli (Western Bulldogs)	Patrick Cripps (Carlton)	Tim Kelly (Geelong)
HF:	Patrick Dangerfield (Geelong)	Jeremy Cameron (Greater Western Sydney)	Michael Walters (Fremantle)
F:	Jack Darling (West Coast)	Tom Hawkins (Geelong)	Charlie Cameron (Brisbane Lions)
Foll:	Brodie Grundy (Collingwood)	Nat Fyfe (Fremantle) (captain)	Lachie Neale (Brisbane Lions)
Int:	Scott Pendlebury (Collingwood)	Elliot Yeo (West Coast)	Max Gawn (Melbourne)
Int:	Jack Macrae (Western Bulldogs)		
Coach:	Damien Hardwick (Richmond)		

==== 2018 ====
2018 All-Australian team
B:	Tom Stewart (Geelong)	Alex Rance (Richmond)	Rory Laird (Adelaide)
HB:	Shannon Hurn (West Coast)	Jeremy McGovern (West Coast)	Lachie Whitfield (Greater Western Sydney)
C:	Andrew Gaff (West Coast)	Dustin Martin (Richmond)	Steele Sidebottom (Collingwood)
HF:	Patrick Dangerfield (Geelong) (vice-captain)	Lance Franklin (Sydney) (captain)	Robbie Gray (Port Adelaide)
F:	Jack Gunston (Hawthorn)	Jack Riewoldt (Richmond)	Luke Breust (Hawthorn)
Foll:	Max Gawn (Melbourne)	Patrick Cripps (Carlton)	Tom Mitchell (Hawthorn)
Int:	Brodie Grundy (Collingwood)	Clayton Oliver (Melbourne)	Shaun Higgins (North Melbourne)
Int:	Shane Edwards (Richmond)		
Coach:	Adam Simpson (West Coast)		

==== 2017 ====
2017 All-Australian team
B:	Michael Hibberd (Melbourne)	Alex Rance (Richmond) (captain)	Jeremy McGovern (West Coast)
HB:	Rory Laird (Adelaide)	Michael Hurley (Essendon)	Sam Docherty (Carlton)
C:	Josh Kelly (Greater Western Sydney)	Dustin Martin (Richmond)	Zach Merrett (Essendon)
HF:	Robbie Gray (Port Adelaide)	Lance Franklin (Sydney)	Dayne Zorko (Brisbane Lions)
F:	Joe Daniher (Essendon)	Josh Kennedy (West Coast) (vice-captain)	Eddie Betts (Adelaide)
Foll:	Paddy Ryder (Port Adelaide)	Patrick Dangerfield (Geelong)	Tom Mitchell (Hawthorn)
Int:	Matt Crouch (Adelaide)	Elliot Yeo (West Coast)	Joel Selwood (Geelong)
Int:	Dylan Shiel (Greater Western Sydney)		
Coach:	Damien Hardwick (Richmond)		

==== 2016 ====
2016 All-Australian team
B:	Dane Rampe (Sydney)	Alex Rance (Richmond)	Jeremy McGovern (West Coast)
HB:	Heath Shaw (Greater Western Sydney)	Daniel Talia (Adelaide)	Corey Enright (Geelong)
C:	Dan Hannebery (Sydney)	Josh Kennedy (Sydney)	Rory Sloane (Adelaide) (vice-captain)
HF:	Toby Greene (Greater Western Sydney)	Lance Franklin (Sydney)	Cyril Rioli (Hawthorn)
F:	Eddie Betts (Adelaide)	Josh Kennedy (West Coast)	Tom Lynch (Gold Coast)
Foll:	Max Gawn (Melbourne)	Patrick Dangerfield (Geelong)	Joel Selwood (Geelong) (captain)
Int:	Marcus Bontempelli (Western Bulldogs)	Luke Parker (Sydney)	Dustin Martin (Richmond)
Int:	Matthew Boyd (Western Bulldogs)		
Coach:	Luke Beveridge (Western Bulldogs)		

==== 2015 ====
2015 All-Australian team
B:	Josh Gibson (Hawthorn)	Alex Rance (Richmond)	Heath Shaw (Greater Western Sydney)
HB:	Easton Wood (Western Bulldogs)	Michael Hurley (Essendon)	Robert Murphy (Western Bulldogs) (captain)
C:	Dan Hannebery (Sydney)	Matt Priddis (West Coast)	Andrew Gaff (West Coast)
HF:	Chad Wingard (Port Adelaide)	Jack Riewoldt (Richmond)	Cyril Rioli (Hawthorn)
F:	Eddie Betts (Adelaide)	Josh Kennedy (West Coast) (vice-captain)	Jake Stringer (Western Bulldogs)
Foll:	Todd Goldstein (North Melbourne)	Nat Fyfe (Fremantle)	Patrick Dangerfield (Adelaide)
Int:	Brett Deledio (Richmond)	Robbie Gray (Port Adelaide)	Sam Mitchell (Hawthorn)
Int:	David Mundy (Fremantle)		
Coach:	Alastair Clarkson (Hawthorn)		

==== 2014 ====
2014 All-Australian team
B:	Cale Hooker (Essendon)	Daniel Talia (Adelaide)	Nick Smith (Sydney)
HB:	Nick Malceski (Sydney)	Alex Rance (Richmond)	Brodie Smith (Adelaide)
C:	Nat Fyfe (Fremantle)	Josh Kennedy (Sydney)	Dyson Heppell (Essendon)
HF:	Robbie Gray (Port Adelaide)	Nick Riewoldt (St Kilda) (vice-captain)	Luke Breust (Hawthorn)
F:	Hayden Ballantyne (Fremantle)	Lance Franklin (Sydney)	Jarryd Roughead (Hawthorn)
Foll:	Aaron Sandilands (Fremantle)	Joel Selwood (Geelong) (captain)	Gary Ablett Jr. (Gold Coast)
Int:	Jordan Lewis (Hawthorn)	Scott Pendlebury (Collingwood)	Travis Boak (Port Adelaide)
Int:	Tom Rockliff (Brisbane Lions)		
Coach:	Alastair Clarkson (Hawthorn)		

Notes:

- Despite winning the Brownlow Medal, Matt Priddis was not selected in the team, but was selected in the initial squad of 40 like Sam Mitchell and Jack Riewoldt were two years earlier.

==== 2013 ====
2013 All-Australian team
B:	Corey Enright (Geelong)	Scott Thompson (North Melbourne)	Michael Johnson (Fremantle)
HB:	Jarrad McVeigh (Sydney)	Harry Taylor (Geelong)	Sam Mitchell (Hawthorn)
C:	Ryan Griffen (Western Bulldogs)	Joel Selwood (Geelong) (captain)	Scott Pendlebury (Collingwood)
HF:	Patrick Dangerfield (Adelaide)	Travis Cloke (Collingwood)	Kieren Jack (Sydney)
F:	Jarryd Roughead (Hawthorn)	Jeremy Cameron (Greater Western Sydney)	Chad Wingard (Port Adelaide)
Foll:	Will Minson (Western Bulldogs)	Dane Swan (Collingwood)	Gary Ablett Jr. (Gold Coast) (vice-captain)
Int:	Travis Boak (Port Adelaide)	Dan Hannebery (Sydney)	Jobe Watson (Essendon)
Int:	Andrew Mackie (Geelong)		
Coach:	Alastair Clarkson (Hawthorn)		

==== 2012 ====
2012 All-Australian team
B:	Sean Dempster (St Kilda)	Luke McPharlin (Fremantle)	Darren Glass (West Coast) (captain)
HB:	Beau Waters (West Coast)	Ted Richards (Sydney)	Grant Birchall (Hawthorn)
C:	Trent Cotchin (Richmond)	Jobe Watson (Essendon)	Dayne Beams (Collingwood)
HF:	Patrick Dangerfield (Adelaide)	Lance Franklin (Hawthorn)	Cyril Rioli (Hawthorn)
F:	Stephen Milne (St Kilda)	Tom Hawkins (Geelong)	Dean Cox (West Coast)
Foll:	Nic Naitanui (West Coast)	Scott Thompson (Adelaide)	Gary Ablett Jr. (Gold Coast) (vice-captain)
Int:	Brett Deledio (Richmond)	Josh Kennedy (Sydney)	Scott Pendlebury (Collingwood)
Int:	Dane Swan (Collingwood)		
Coach:	John Longmire (Sydney)		

Notes:

- Despite being awarded the Brownlow Medal retrospectively alongside Trent Cotchin over four years later in November 2016, Sam Mitchell was not selected in the team. However, he was selected in the initial squad of 40. Cotchin was named in the team alongside Jobe Watson, who received the most Brownlow votes and was initially awarded the medal before being stripped of it due to the Essendon supplements saga.
- Despite winning the Coleman Medal, Jack Riewoldt was also not selected in the team. He, too, was selected in the initial squad of 40.

==== 2011 ====
2011 All-Australian team
B:	Matthew Scarlett (Geelong)	Darren Glass (West Coast)	Corey Enright (Geelong)
HB:	Robert Murphy (Western Bulldogs)	Ben Reid (Collingwood)	Leon Davis (Collingwood)
C:	Dale Thomas (Collingwood)	Sam Mitchell (Hawthorn)	Scott Pendlebury (Collingwood)
HF:	Marc Murphy (Carlton)	Travis Cloke (Collingwood)	Dane Swan (Collingwood)
F:	Stephen Milne (St Kilda)	Lance Franklin (Hawthorn)	Adam Goodes (Sydney)
Foll:	Dean Cox (West Coast)	Chris Judd (Carlton) (vice-captain)	Gary Ablett Jr. (Gold Coast) (captain)
Int:	Matthew Boyd (Western Bulldogs)	Nick Dal Santo (St Kilda)	James Kelly (Geelong)
Int:	Drew Petrie (North Melbourne)		
Coach:	Chris Scott (Geelong)		

==== 2010 ====
2010 All-Australian team
B:	James Frawley (Melbourne)	Brian Lake (Western Bulldogs)	Corey Enright (Geelong)
HB:	Brendon Goddard (St Kilda)	Harry Taylor (Geelong)	Harry O'Brien (Collingwood)
C:	Leigh Montagna (St Kilda)	Luke Hodge (Hawthorn) (captain)	Joel Selwood (Geelong)
HF:	Alan Didak (Collingwood)	Lance Franklin (Hawthorn)	Paul Chapman (Geelong)
F:	Barry Hall (Western Bulldogs)	Jack Riewoldt (Richmond)	Mark LeCras (West Coast)
Foll:	Aaron Sandilands (Fremantle)	Dane Swan (Collingwood)	Gary Ablett Jr. (Geelong) (vice-captain)
Int:	Mark Jamar (Melbourne)	Steve Johnson (Geelong)	Chris Judd (Carlton)
Int:	Scott Pendlebury (Collingwood)		
Coach:	Mick Malthouse (Collingwood)		

==== 2009 ====
2009 All-Australian team
B:	Corey Enright (Geelong)	Matthew Scarlett (Geelong)	Brian Lake (Western Bulldogs)
HB:	Simon Goodwin (Adelaide)	Craig Bolton (Sydney)	Nick Maxwell (Collingwood)
C:	Leigh Montagna (St Kilda)	Lenny Hayes (St Kilda)	Joel Selwood (Geelong)
HF:	Paul Chapman (Geelong)	Nick Riewoldt (St Kilda) (captain)	Dane Swan (Collingwood)
F:	Leon Davis (Collingwood)	Brendan Fevola (Carlton)	Jonathan Brown (Brisbane Lions)
Foll:	Aaron Sandilands (Fremantle)	Chris Judd (Carlton) (vice-captain)	Gary Ablett Jr. (Geelong)
Int:	Matthew Boyd (Western Bulldogs)	Nick Dal Santo (St Kilda)	Brendon Goddard (St Kilda)
Int:	Adam Goodes (Sydney)		
Coach:	Mark Thompson (Geelong)		

==== 2008 ====
2008 All-Australian team
B:	Dale Morris (Western Bulldogs)	Matthew Scarlett (Geelong)	Tom Harley (Geelong) (vice-captain)
HB:	Luke Hodge (Hawthorn)	Nathan Bock (Adelaide)	Sam Fisher (St Kilda)
C:	Jimmy Bartel (Geelong)	Joel Corey (Geelong)	Adam Cooney (Western Bulldogs)
HF:	Steve Johnson (Geelong)	Nick Riewoldt (St Kilda)	Brent Harvey (North Melbourne)
F:	Brendan Fevola (Carlton)	Lance Franklin (Hawthorn)	Paul Medhurst (Collingwood)
Foll:	Dean Cox (West Coast)	Chris Judd (Carlton) (captain)	Gary Ablett Jr. (Geelong)
Int:	Corey Enright (Geelong)	Matthew Pavlich (Fremantle)	Matthew Richardson (Richmond)
Int:	Aaron Sandilands (Fremantle)		
Coach:	Alastair Clarkson (Hawthorn)		

==== 2007 ====
2007 All-Australian team
B:	Matthew Scarlett (Geelong)	Darren Glass (West Coast)	Darren Milburn (Geelong)
HB:	Andrew McLeod (Adelaide) (captain)	Matthew Egan (Geelong)	Campbell Brown (Hawthorn)
C:	Kane Cornes (Port Adelaide)	Jimmy Bartel (Geelong)	Chad Cornes (Port Adelaide)
HF:	Steve Johnson (Geelong)	Jonathan Brown (Brisbane Lions) (vice-captain)	Brent Harvey (Kangaroos)
F:	Brad Johnson (Western Bulldogs)	Matthew Pavlich (Fremantle)	Cameron Mooney (Geelong)
Foll:	Dean Cox (West Coast)	Daniel Kerr (West Coast)	Gary Ablett Jr. (Geelong)
Int:	Joel Corey (Geelong)	Dustin Fletcher (Essendon)	Brendon Lade (Port Adelaide)
Int:	Cameron Ling (Geelong)		
Coach:	Mark Thompson (Geelong)		

Notes:

- For the first occasion, a preliminary squad of 40 was announced.
- With nine players selected, Geelong set a record for most players from one club in an All-Australian team, a record which stands to this day.

==== 2006 ====
2006 All-Australian team
B:	Nathan Bassett (Adelaide)	Darren Glass (West Coast)	Lindsay Gilbee (Western Bulldogs)
HB:	Craig Bolton (Sydney)	Joel Bowden (Richmond)	Andrew McLeod (Adelaide)
C:	Simon Goodwin (Adelaide)	Scott West (Western Bulldogs)	Adam Goodes (Sydney)
HF:	Alan Didak (Collingwood)	Barry Hall (Sydney) (vice-captain)	Ryan O'Keefe (Sydney)
F:	Brad Johnson (Western Bulldogs) (captain)	Brendan Fevola (Carlton)	Nick Riewoldt (St Kilda)
Foll:	Brendon Lade (Port Adelaide)	Chris Judd (West Coast)	Ben Cousins (West Coast)
Int:	Shaun Burgoyne (Port Adelaide)	Dean Cox (West Coast)	James McDonald (Melbourne)
Int:	Matthew Pavlich (Fremantle)		
Coach:	John Worsfold (West Coast)		

==== 2005 ====
2005 All-Australian team
B:	David Wirrpanda (West Coast)	Ben Rutten (Adelaide)	James Clement (Collingwood)
HB:	Joel Bowden (Richmond)	Trent Croad (Hawthorn)	Luke Hodge (Hawthorn)
C:	Nick Dal Santo (St Kilda)	Scott West (Western Bulldogs)	Lenny Hayes (St Kilda)
HF:	Mark Ricciuto (Adelaide) (captain)	Matthew Pavlich (Fremantle)	Shannon Grant (Kangaroos)
F:	Brad Johnson (Western Bulldogs)	Barry Hall (Sydney)	Peter Everitt (Hawthorn)
Foll:	Dean Cox (West Coast)	Luke Ball (St Kilda)	Ben Cousins (West Coast) (vice-captain)
Int:	Leo Barry (Sydney)	Kane Cornes (Port Adelaide)	Simon Goodwin (Adelaide)
Int:	Brent Harvey (Kangaroos)		
Coach:	Paul Roos (Sydney)		

Notes:

- Despite winning the Coleman Medal, Fraser Gehrig was not selected in the team.

==== 2004 ====
2004 All-Australian team
B:	Leo Barry (Sydney)	Matthew Scarlett (Geelong)	Chris Johnson (Brisbane Lions)
HB:	Austinn Jones (St Kilda)	Chad Cornes (Port Adelaide)	Adam McPhee (Essendon)
C:	Chris Judd (West Coast)	Simon Black (Brisbane Lions)	Nigel Lappin (Brisbane Lions)
HF:	Jason Akermanis (Brisbane Lions)	Warren Tredrea (Port Adelaide) (vice-captain)	Nick Riewoldt (St Kilda)
F:	Barry Hall (Sydney)	Fraser Gehrig (St Kilda)	Luke Power (Brisbane Lions)
Foll:	Jeff White (Melbourne)	Mark Ricciuto (Adelaide) (captain)	Scott West (Western Bulldogs)
Int:	James Clement (Collingwood)	Chad Fletcher (West Coast)	Brett Kirk (Sydney)
Int:	Matthew Lappin (Carlton)		
Coach:	Mark Williams (Port Adelaide)		

==== 2003 ====
2003 All-Australian team
B:	Gavin Wanganeen (Port Adelaide)	Matthew Scarlett (Geelong)	Joel Smith (Hawthorn)
HB:	Rohan Smith (Western Bulldogs)	Justin Leppitsch (Brisbane Lions)	Nigel Lappin (Brisbane Lions)
C:	Lenny Hayes (St Kilda)	Michael Voss (Brisbane Lions) (captain)	Paul Williams (Sydney)
HF:	Matthew Pavlich (Fremantle)	Warren Tredrea (Port Adelaide)	Mark Ricciuto (Adelaide)
F:	Phillip Matera (West Coast)	Matthew Lloyd (Essendon)	Chris Tarrant (Collingwood)
Foll:	Adam Goodes (Sydney)	Nathan Buckley (Collingwood) (vice-captain)	Peter Bell (Fremantle)
Int:	James Hird (Essendon)	Michael Gardiner (West Coast)	Paul Hasleby (Fremantle)
Int:	Robert Harvey (St Kilda)		
Coach:	Leigh Matthews (Brisbane Lions)		

==== 2002 ====
2002 All-Australian team
B:	Chris Johnson (Brisbane Lions)	Matthew Pavlich (Fremantle)	Glenn Archer (Kangaroos)
HB:	Brett Montgomery (Port Adelaide)	Justin Leppitsch (Brisbane Lions)	Ben Hart (Adelaide)
C:	Jason Akermanis (Brisbane Lions)	Simon Black (Brisbane Lions)	Adem Yze (Melbourne)
HF:	Michael Voss (Brisbane Lions) (captain)	Warren Tredrea (Port Adelaide)	Brad Johnson (Western Bulldogs)
F:	Nathan Brown (Western Bulldogs)	David Neitz (Melbourne)	Luke Darcy (Western Bulldogs)
Foll:	Matthew Primus (Port Adelaide) (vice-captain)	Josh Francou (Port Adelaide)	Ben Cousins (West Coast)
Int:	Shane Crawford (Hawthorn)	Nigel Lappin (Brisbane Lions)	Mark Ricciuto (Adelaide)
Int:	Adam Simpson (Kangaroos)		
Coach:	Leigh Matthews (Brisbane Lions)		

==== 2001 ====
2001 All-Australian team
B:	Gavin Wanganeen (Port Adelaide)	Jonathan Hay (Hawthorn)	Darren Gaspar (Richmond)
HB:	Joel Smith (Hawthorn)	Sean Wellman (Essendon)	Andrew McKay (Carlton)
C:	Jason Akermanis (Brisbane Lions)	Brett Ratten (Carlton)	Nathan Buckley (Collingwood)
HF:	Michael Voss (Brisbane Lions) (vice-captain)	Warren Tredrea (Port Adelaide)	James Hird (Essendon) (captain)
F:	Brad Ottens (Richmond)	Matthew Lloyd (Essendon)	Ben Cousins (West Coast)
Foll:	Matthew Primus (Port Adelaide)	Simon Black (Brisbane Lions)	Andrew McLeod (Adelaide)
Int:	Nathan Brown (Western Bulldogs)	Simon Goodwin (Adelaide)	Jason Johnson (Essendon)
Int:	Nigel Lappin (Brisbane Lions)		
Coach:	Leigh Matthews (Brisbane Lions)		

==== 2000 ====
2000 All-Australian team
B:	Damien Hardwick (Essendon)	Dustin Fletcher (Essendon)	Andrew Kellaway (Richmond)
HB:	Andrew McKay (Carlton)	Darren Gaspar (Richmond)	Simon Goodwin (Adelaide)
C:	Scott West (Western Bulldogs)	Brett Ratten (Carlton)	Scott Camporeale (Carlton)
HF:	Andrew McLeod (Adelaide)	Wayne Carey (Kangaroos) (captain)	James Hird (Essendon)
F:	Jeff Farmer (Melbourne)	Matthew Lloyd (Essendon)	Michael O'Loughlin (Sydney)
Foll:	Steven King (Geelong)	Anthony Koutoufides (Carlton)	Nathan Buckley (Collingwood) (vice-captain)
Int:	Lance Whitnall (Carlton)	Brent Harvey (Kangaroos)	Mark Ricciuto (Adelaide)
Int:	Brad Johnson (Western Bulldogs)		
Coach:	Kevin Sheedy (Essendon)		

Notes:

- Despite winning the Brownlow Medal and club best and fairest in a grand final year, Shane Woewodin was not selected in the team. Notably three Adelaide midfielders were selected despite that club missing the finals with a 9–13 win–loss record, although none of the three selected were positioned in midfield or onballer positions.

==== 1999 ====
1999 All-Australian team
B:	Jason Akermanis (Brisbane Lions)	Justin Leppitsch (Brisbane Lions)	Ben Hart (Adelaide)
HB:	Byron Pickett (Kangaroos)	Stephen Silvagni (Carlton)	Andrew McKay (Carlton)
C:	Brad Johnson (Western Bulldogs)	Nathan Buckley (Collingwood) (vice-captain)	Wayne Schwass (Sydney)
HF:	Mark Mercuri (Essendon)	Wayne Carey (Kangaroos) (captain)	Michael Voss (Brisbane Lions)
F:	Ben Cousins (West Coast)	Matthew Lloyd (Essendon)	Matthew Richardson (Richmond)
Foll:	Matthew Allan (Carlton)	Robert Harvey (St Kilda)	Shane Crawford (Hawthorn)
Int:	Peter Bell (Kangaroos)	Nathan Burke (St Kilda)	Wayne Campbell (Richmond)
Int:	Chris Grant (Western Bulldogs)		
Coach:	Denis Pagan (Kangaroos)		

Notes:

- Despite winning the Coleman Medal, Scott Cummings was not selected in the team.

==== 1998 ====
1998 All-Australian team
B:	David King (North Melbourne)	Ashley McIntosh (West Coast)	Glenn Archer (North Melbourne)
HB:	Nathan Buckley (Collingwood)	Sean Wellman (Essendon)	Nigel Smart (Adelaide)
C:	Matthew Knights (Richmond)	Scott West (Western Bulldogs)	Shane Crawford (Hawthorn)
HF:	Paul Hudson (Western Bulldogs)	Wayne Carey (North Melbourne) (captain)	Mark Ricciuto (Adelaide)
F:	Ben Cousins (West Coast)	Tony Lockett (Sydney)	Matthew Lloyd (Essendon)
Foll:	Peter Everitt (St Kilda)	Todd Viney (Melbourne)	Robert Harvey (St Kilda) (vice-captain)
Int:	Chris Grant (Western Bulldogs)	Andrew McLeod (Adelaide)	Shaun Rehn (Adelaide)
Int:	Anthony Stevens (North Melbourne)		
Coach:	Terry Wallace (Western Bulldogs)		

Notes:

- 1998 was the final season in which the coach of the All-Australian team was not necessarily the premiership coach. Indeed, premiership-winning coach Malcolm Blight was not included in the team.

==== 1997 ====
1997 All-Australian team
B:	David King (North Melbourne)	Stephen Silvagni (Carlton)	Paul Roos (Sydney)
HB:	Peter Matera (West Coast)	Michael Sexton (Carlton)	Adam Heuskes (Port Adelaide)
C:	Austinn Jones (St Kilda)	Craig Bradley (Carlton)	Nathan Buckley (Collingwood)
HF:	Rohan Smith (Western Bulldogs)	Chris Grant (Western Bulldogs)	Michael O'Loughlin (Sydney)
F:	Fraser Gehrig (West Coast)	Tony Modra (Adelaide)	Paul Kelly (Sydney) (captain)
Foll:	Paul Salmon (Hawthorn)	Robert Harvey (St Kilda)	Nathan Burke (St Kilda) (vice-captain)
Int:	Mark Ricciuto (Adelaide)	Peter Everitt (St Kilda)	Daryn Cresswell (Sydney)
Coach:	Stan Alves (St Kilda)		

==== 1996 ====
1996 All-Australian team
B:	Nathan Burke (St Kilda)	Stephen Silvagni (Carlton)	Michael Sexton (Carlton)
HB:	Nathan Buckley (Collingwood)	Paul Roos (Sydney)	Peter Matera (West Coast)
C:	Chris Mainwaring (West Coast)	Paul Kelly (Sydney) (captain)	Shane Crawford (Hawthorn)
HF:	James Hird (Essendon)	Wayne Carey (North Melbourne) (vice-captain)	Mitchell White (West Coast)
F:	Michael Voss (Brisbane Bears)	Tony Lockett (Sydney)	Darren Jarman (Adelaide)
Foll:	Corey McKernan (North Melbourne)	Robert Harvey (St Kilda)	Craig Lambert (Brisbane Bears)
Int:	Garry Hocking (Geelong)	Glenn Archer (North Melbourne)	Matthew Richardson (Richmond)
Coach:	Rodney Eade (Sydney)		

==== 1995 ====
1995 All-Australian team
B:	Gavin Wanganeen (Essendon)	Stephen Silvagni (Carlton)	Ang Christou (Carlton)
HB:	Michael Mansfield (Geelong)	Glen Jakovich (West Coast)	Wayne Campbell (Richmond)
C:	Nicky Winmar (St Kilda)	Paul Couch (Geelong)	Michael Long (Essendon)
HF:	Garry Lyon (Melbourne)	Wayne Carey (North Melbourne) (vice-captain)	James Hird (Essendon)
F:	Darren Jarman (Hawthorn)	Gary Ablett Sr. (Geelong) (captain)	Tony Lockett (Sydney)
Foll:	Justin Madden (Carlton)	Robert Harvey (St Kilda)	Craig Bradley (Carlton)
Int:	Anthony Koutoufides (Carlton)	David Neitz (Melbourne)	Paul Kelly (Sydney)
Coach:	David Parkin (Carlton)		

==== 1994 ====
1994 All-Australian team
B:	David Hart (West Coast)	Stephen Silvagni (Carlton)	Chris Langford (Hawthorn)
HB:	Guy McKenna (West Coast)	Glen Jakovich (West Coast)	Michael Mansfield (Geelong)
C:	Stephen Tingay (Melbourne)	Greg Williams (Carlton) (captain)	Peter Matera (West Coast)
HF:	Gavin Brown (Collingwood) (vice-captain)	Wayne Carey (North Melbourne)	Garry Lyon (Melbourne)
F:	Jason Dunstall (Hawthorn)	Gary Ablett Sr. (Geelong)	Ben Allan (Hawthorn)
Foll:	Shaun Rehn (Adelaide)	Robert Harvey (St Kilda)	Garry Hocking (Geelong)
Int:	Mark Ricciuto (Adelaide)	Craig Bradley (Carlton)	Stephen Kernahan (Carlton)
Coach:	Neil Balme (Melbourne)		

==== 1993 ====
1993 All-Australian team
B:	Ben Hart (Adelaide)	Alastair Lynch (Fitzroy)	Gavin Wanganeen (Essendon)
HB:	Guy McKenna (West Coast)	Mark Harvey (Essendon)	Andrew McKay (Carlton)
C:	Greg Anderson (Adelaide)	Greg Williams (Carlton) (vice-captain)	Peter Matera (West Coast)
HF:	Craig Bradley (Carlton)	Wayne Carey (North Melbourne) (captain)	Garry Lyon (Melbourne)
F:	Garry Hocking (Geelong)	Gary Ablett Sr. (Geelong)	Tony Modra (Adelaide)
Foll:	Jim Stynes (Melbourne)	Ben Allan (Hawthorn)	Tony McGuinness (Adelaide)
Int:	Nigel Smart (Adelaide)	Nathan Burke (St Kilda)	
Coach:	Kevin Sheedy (Essendon)		

==== 1992 ====
1992 All-Australian team
B:	Ben Hart (Adelaide)	Paul Roos (Fitzroy) (captain)	Gavin Wanganeen (Essendon)
HB:	Ken Hinkley (Geelong)	Barry Stoneham (Geelong)	Mil Hanna (Carlton)
C:	Dean Kemp (West Coast)	Darren Jarman (Hawthorn)	Mick McGuane (Collingwood)
HF:	Robert Harvey (St Kilda)	Stewart Loewe (St Kilda)	Gary Ablett Sr. (Geelong)
F:	Tony McGuinness (Adelaide)	Jason Dunstall (Hawthorn)	Tony Lockett (St Kilda)
Foll:	Scott Wynd (Footscray)	Chris McDermott (Adelaide) (vice-captain)	John Platten (Hawthorn)
Int:	Stephen Kernahan (Carlton)	Mark Bairstow (Geelong)	
Coach:	Terry Wheeler (Footscray)		

==== 1991 ====
1991 All-Australian team
B:	Guy McKenna (West Coast)	Anthony Daniher (Essendon)	Nigel Smart (Adelaide)
HB:	David Grant (St Kilda)	Paul Roos (Fitzroy) (captain)	Ken Hinkley (Geelong)
C:	Chris Mainwaring (West Coast)	Paul Couch (Geelong)	Peter Matera (West Coast)
HF:	Gavin Brown (Collingwood) (vice-captain)	Stewart Loewe (St Kilda)	Nicky Winmar (St Kilda)
F:	Tony Francis (Collingwood)	Tony Lockett (St Kilda)	Garry Hocking (Geelong)
Foll:	Jim Stynes (Melbourne)	Mark Bairstow (Geelong)	Barry Mitchell (Sydney)
Int:	Billy Brownless (Geelong)	Craig Turley (West Coast)	
Coach:	Mick Malthouse (West Coast)		

Notes:

- Despite winning that season's Grand Final, Hawthorn did not supply one player in the team of the year.

=== VFL/AFL Team of the Year: 1982–1990 ===
The AFL website recognises players who were named in the VFL/AFL Team of the Year from 1982 to 1990 as having All-Australian status. This was a team picked by Victorian selectors. Teams were named every season from 1982 to 1990, except 1985.

==== 1990 ====
1990 AFL Team of the Year
B:	Andrew Collins (Hawthorn)	Stephen Silvagni (Carlton)	John Worsfold (West Coast)
HB:	Brett Lovett (Melbourne)	Garry Lyon (Melbourne)	Gary O'Donnell (Essendon)
C:	Darren Millane (Collingwood)	Tony Shaw (Collingwood) (captain)	Graham Wright (Collingwood)
HF:	Peter Daicos (Collingwood)	Stewart Loewe (St Kilda)	Gary Ablett Sr. (Geelong)
F:	Stephen Kernahan (Carlton)	John Longmire (North Melbourne)	Scott Russell (Collingwood)
Foll:	Simon Madden (Essendon)	Chris Lewis (West Coast)	Tony McGuinness (Footscray)
Int:	Mick McGuane (Collingwood)	Mark Thompson (Essendon)	Tony Liberatore (Footscray)
Int:	Michael Tuck (Hawthorn)		
Coach:	Leigh Matthews (Collingwood)		

==== 1989 ====
1989 VFL Team of the Year
B:	Alan Johnson (Melbourne)	Chris Langford (Hawthorn)	Gary Pert (Fitzroy)
HB:	Brett Lovett (Melbourne)	Garry Lyon (Melbourne)	Guy McKenna (West Coast)
C:	Darrin Pritchard (Hawthorn)	Paul Couch (Geelong)	Gavin Brown (Collingwood)
HF:	Nicky Winmar (St Kilda)	Stephen Kernahan (Carlton)	Gary Ablett Sr. (Geelong)
F:	Barry Stoneham (Geelong)	Jason Dunstall (Hawthorn)	Andrew Bews (Geelong)
Foll:	Simon Madden (Essendon)	Mark Bairstow (Geelong)	John Platten (Hawthorn)
Int:	Terry Daniher (Essendon)	Tim Watson (Essendon)	Mark Bayes (Sydney)
Int:	Greg Williams (Sydney)		

==== 1988 ====
1988 VFL Team of the Year
B:	Gary Ayres (Hawthorn)	Chris Langford (Hawthorn)	Danny Frawley (St Kilda)
HB:	John Worsfold (West Coast)	Stephen Silvagni (Carlton)	Brett Lovett (Melbourne)
C:	Darren Kappler (Fitzroy)	Greg Williams (Sydney)	Craig Bradley (Carlton)
HF:	Gary Buckenara (Hawthorn)	Stephen Kernahan (Carlton)	Peter Daicos (Collingwood)
F:	Dale Weightman (Richmond)	Jason Dunstall (Hawthorn)	Steven O'Dwyer (Melbourne)
Foll:	Simon Madden (Essendon)	Gerard Healy (Sydney)	John Platten (Hawthorn)
Int:	Shane Morwood (Collingwood)	Dermott Brereton (Hawthorn)	Matthew Larkin (North Melbourne)
Int:	Barry Mitchell (Sydney)		

==== 1987 ====
1987 VFL Team of the Year
B:	Andrew Bews (Geelong)	Chris Langford (Hawthorn)	David Rhys-Jones (Carlton)
HB:	Sean Wight (Melbourne)	Paul Roos (Fitzroy)	Mark Bos (Geelong)
C:	Robert DiPierdomenico (Hawthorn)	Greg Williams (Sydney)	Steven Stretch (Melbourne)
HF:	Wayne Johnston (Carlton)	Stephen Kernahan (Carlton)	Tony McGuinness (Footscray)
F:	Mark Bairstow (Geelong)	Tony Lockett (St Kilda)	Dale Weightman (Richmond)
Foll:	Justin Madden (Carlton)	Gerard Healy (Sydney)	John Platten (Hawthorn)
Int:	Simon Madden (Essendon)	Russell Morris (Hawthorn)	Jim Krakouer (North Melbourne)
Int:	Ross Glendinning (West Coast)		

==== 1986 ====
1986 VFL Team of the Year
B:	Mark Thompson (Essendon)	Gary Pert (Fitzroy)	Gary Ayres (Hawthorn)
HB:	Glenn Hawker (Essendon)	Paul Roos (Fitzroy)	Dennis Carroll (Sydney)
C:	Doug Hawkins (Footscray)	Greg Williams (Sydney)	Robert DiPierdomenico (Hawthorn)
HF:	Gary Ablett Sr. (Geelong)	Terry Daniher (Essendon) (captain)	Gary Buckenara (Hawthorn)
F:	Wayne Blackwell (Carlton)	Brian Taylor (Collingwood)	Jim Krakouer (North Melbourne)
Foll:	Greg Dear (Hawthorn)	Gerard Healy (Sydney)	Dale Weightman (Richmond)
Int:	Craig Bradley (Carlton)	Justin Madden (Carlton)	John Platten (Hawthorn)
Int:	Dermott Brereton (Hawthorn)		
Coach:	Allan Jeans (Hawthorn)		

==== 1984 ====
1984 VFL Team of the Year
B:	David Ackerly (Sydney)	Chris Mew (Hawthorn)	Peter Moore (Melbourne)
HB:	Bruce Doull (Carlton)	Ross Glendinning (North Melbourne)	Ross Thornton (Fitzroy)
C:	Robert DiPierdomenico (Hawthorn)	Leon Baker (Essendon)	Robert Flower (Melbourne) (vice-captain)
HF:	Gary Ablett Sr. (Geelong)	Terry Daniher (Essendon) (captain)	Gerard Healy (Melbourne)
F:	Mark Lee (Richmond)	Bernie Quinlan (Fitzroy)	Tony Shaw (Collingwood)
Foll:	Simon Madden (Essendon)	Russell Greene (Hawthorn)	Kym Hodgeman (North Melbourne)
Int:	Rod Ashman (Carlton)	Denis Banks (Collingwood)	Andrew Purser (Footscray)
Int:	Doug Hawkins (Footscray)	Greg Burns (St Kilda)	Bernie Evans (Sydney)
Coach:	Kevin Sheedy (Essendon)		

==== 1983 ====
1983 VFL Team of the Year
B:	Des English (Carlton)	Gary Malarkey (Geelong)	Gary Ayres (Hawthorn)
HB:	Ken Hunter (Carlton)	Ross Glendinning (North Melbourne)	Russell Greene (Hawthorn)
C:	Robert Flower (Melbourne)	Terry Wallace (Hawthorn)	Geoff Cunningham (St Kilda)
HF:	Tim Watson (Essendon)	Terry Daniher (Essendon)	Maurice Rioli (Richmond)
F:	Simon Madden (Essendon)	Bernie Quinlan (Fitzroy)	Leigh Matthews (Hawthorn)
Foll:	Mark Lee (Richmond)	Michael Tuck (Hawthorn)	Brian Royal (Footscray)
Int:	Billy Picken (Collingwood)	Mark Browning (Sydney)	
Coach:	Allan Jeans (Hawthorn)		

==== 1982 ====
1982 VFL Team of the Year
B:	David Ackerly (Sydney)	Kelvin Moore (Hawthorn)	David O'Halloran (Hawthorn)
HB:	Ken Hunter (Carlton)	Ross Glendinning (North Melbourne)	Steven Icke (Melbourne)
C:	Jim Buckley (Carlton)	Brian Wilson (Melbourne)	Robert Flower (Melbourne)
HF:	Peter Daicos (Collingwood)	Paul Vander Haar (Essendon)	Gerard Healy (Melbourne)
F:	Gary Dempsey (North Melbourne)	Malcolm Blight (North Melbourne)	Leigh Matthews (Hawthorn)
Foll:	Mike Fitzpatrick (Carlton)	Barry Rowlings (Richmond)	Rod Ashman (Carlton)
Int:	Terry Wallace (Hawthorn)	Greg Smith (Sydney)	
Coach:	David Parkin (Carlton)		

=== Australian Football Carnival era: 1953–1988 ===
State of origin era

==== 1988 ====
1988 All-Australian Team Adelaide Bicentennial Carnival
Name	State/League	Club
Terry Daniher	New South Wales	Essendon
David Murphy	New South Wales	Sydney
Michael Long	Northern Territory	St Mary's
Michael McLean	Northern Territory	Footscray
Maurice Rioli	Northern Territory	St Mary's
Tony Hall	South Australia	Glenelg
Danny Hughes	South Australia	Melbourne
Stephen Kernahan	South Australia	Carlton (captain)
Martin Leslie	South Australia	Port Adelaide
Bruce Lindner	South Australia	Geelong
Tony McGuinness	South Australia	Footscray
Mark Mickan	South Australia	Brisbane Bears
John Platten	South Australia	Hawthorn
Greg Whittlesea	South Australia	Sturt
Graham Cornes	South Australia	Glenelg (coach)
Terry Wallace	Victorian Football Association	Richmond
Danny Frawley	Victorian Football League	St Kilda
Gerard Healy	Victorian Football League	Sydney
Simon Madden	Victorian Football League	Essendon
Paul Roos	Victorian Football League	Fitzroy
Paul Salmon	Victorian Football League	Essendon
Dale Weightman	Victorian Football League	Richmond
Steve Malaxos	Western Australia	West Coast

==== 1987 ====
1987 All-Australian Team
Name	State/League	Current Club
Matthew Campbell	South Australia	Brisbane Bears
Andrew Jarman	South Australia	North Adelaide
Bruce Lindner	South Australia	Geelong
Chris McDermott	South Australia	Glenelg (captain)
Mark Naley	South Australia	Carlton
John Platten	South Australia	Hawthorn
Matt Rendell	South Australia	Fitzroy
Andrew Rogers	South Australia	Woodville
Scott Salisbury	South Australia	Glenelg
Graham Cornes	South Australia	Glenelg (coach)
Andrew Bews	Victoria	Geelong
Gerard Healy	Victoria	Sydney
Chris Langford	Victoria	Hawthorn
Simon Madden	Victoria	Essendon
Russell Morris	Victoria	Hawthorn
Paul Roos	Victoria	Fitzroy
Paul Salmon	Victoria	Essendon
Bernard Toohey	Victoria	Sydney
Greg Williams	Victoria	Sydney
Mark Bairstow	Western Australia	Geelong
Craig Holden	Western Australia	Sydney
Phil Narkle	Western Australia	West Coast

==== 1986 ====
1986 All-Australian Team
Name	State of Origin	Current Club
Michael Aish	South Australia	Norwood
Craig Bradley	South Australia	Carlton
Andrew Jarman	South Australia	North Adelaide
Stephen Kernahan	South Australia	Carlton
Chris McDermott	South Australia	Glenelg
Mark Naley	South Australia	South Adelaide
John Platten	South Australia	Hawthorn
Gerard Healy	Victoria	Sydney
Brian Royal	Victoria	Footscray
Kevin Walsh	Victoria	Essendon
Dale Weightman	Victoria	Richmond
Greg Williams	Victoria	Sydney
Gary Buckenara	Western Australia	Hawthorn
Brad Hardie	Western Australia	Footscray
Laurie Keene	Western Australia	Subiaco
Andrew Macnish	Western Australia	Subiaco
Steve Malaxos	Western Australia	Claremont
Michael Mitchell	Western Australia	Claremont
Phil Narkle	Western Australia	St Kilda
Brian Peake	Western Australia	East Fremantle (captain)
Maurice Rioli	Western Australia	Richmond
Robert Wiley	Western Australia	Perth
Peter Wilson	Western Australia	East Fremantle
Ron Alexander	Western Australia	East Fremantle (coach)

==== 1985 ====
1985 All-Australian Team Coach: Kevin Sheedy
Name	State	Club
Malcolm Blight	South Australia	Woodville
Craig Bradley	South Australia	Port Adelaide
Stephen Kernahan	South Australia	Glenelg
Peter Motley	South Australia	Sturt
John Platten	South Australia	Central District
Dermott Brereton	Victoria	Hawthorn
Terry Daniher	Victoria	Essendon (captain)
Garry Foulds	Victoria	Essendon
Russell Greene	Victoria	Hawthorn
Mark Harvey	Victoria	Essendon
Mark Lee	Victoria	Richmond
Roger Merrett	Victoria	Essendon
Gary Pert	Victoria	Fitzroy
Geoff Raines	Victoria	Collingwood
Paul Roos	Victoria	Fitzroy
Dale Weightman	Victoria	Richmond
Leon Baker	Western Australia	Essendon
Gary Buckenara	Western Australia	Hawthorn
Rod Lester-Smith	Western Australia	Hawthorn
Michael Mitchell	Western Australia	Claremont

==== 1983 ====
1983 All-Australian Team Coach: John Todd
Name	State	Club
Michael Aish	South Australia	Norwood
Craig Bradley	South Australia	Port Adelaide
Stephen Curtis	South Australia	Port Adelaide
Tony Giles	South Australia	Port Adelaide
Peter Motley	South Australia	Sturt
Matt Rendell	South Australia	Fitzroy
Craig Williams	South Australia	West Adelaide
Terry Daniher	Victoria	Essendon
Robert Flower	Victoria	Melbourne
Keith Greig	Victoria	North Melbourne
Mark Lee	Victoria	Richmond
Simon Madden	Victoria	Essendon
Stephen McCann	Victoria	North Melbourne
Michael Tuck	Victoria	Hawthorn
Gary Buckenara	Western Australia	Hawthorn
Ross Glendinning	Western Australia	North Melbourne
Stephen Michael	Western Australia	South Fremantle (captain)
Mike Richardson	Western Australia	Collingwood
Maurice Rioli	Western Australia	Richmond
Kevin Taylor	Western Australia	East Fremantle

==== 1980 ====
1980 All-Australian Team Adelaide Carnival Coach: Tom Hafey
Name	State/League	Club
Peter Carey	South Australia	Glenelg
Graham Cornes	South Australia	Glenelg
Rick Davies	South Australia	Sturt (captain)
Robbert Klomp	South Australia	Carlton
Keith Kuhlmann	South Australia	Glenelg
Greg Phillips	South Australia	Port Adelaide
John Roberts	South Australia	South Melbourne
Mark Williams	South Australia	Port Adelaide
Ron Stubbs	Tasmania	Devonport
Darryl Sutton	Tasmania	North Melbourne
Robert Flower	Victoria	Melbourne
Jim Jess	Victoria	Richmond
Mark Lee	Victoria	Richmond
Ian Nankervis	Victoria	Geelong
Geoff Raines	Victoria	Richmond
Geoff Southby	Victoria	Carlton
Garry Wilson	Victoria	Fitzroy
Bruce Duperouzel	Western Australia	St Kilda
Ken Hunter	Western Australia	Claremont
Brian Peake	Western Australia	East Fremantle

==== 1979 ====
1979 All-Australian Team Perth Carnival
Name	State/League	Club
Peter Carey	South Australia	Glenelg
Graham Cornes	South Australia	Glenelg
Kym Hodgeman	South Australia	Glenelg
Peter Jonas	South Australia	Central District
Geoff Morris	South Australia	West Adelaide
Des James	Tasmania	Sandy Bay
Michael Roach	Tasmania	Richmond
Darryl Sutton	Tasmania	North Melbourne
David Cloke	Victoria	Richmond
Bruce Doull	Victoria	Carlton
Kelvin Moore	Victoria	Hawthorn
Peter Moore	Victoria	Collingwood
Michael Tuck	Victoria	Hawthorn
Michael Turner	Victoria	Geelong
Garry Wilson	Victoria	Fitzroy
Tony Buhagiar	Western Australia	East Fremantle
Ken Hunter	Western Australia	Claremont
Gary Malarkey	Western Australia	Geelong
Bruce Monteath	Western Australia	Richmond
Brian Peake	Western Australia	East Fremantle (captain)
Barry Cable	Western Australia	East Perth (coach)

Pre-State of Origin era

==== 1972 ====
1972 All-Australian Team Perth Carnival
Name	State/League	Club
Malcolm Blight	South Australia	Woodville
Tony Burgan	South Australia	Sturt
Jim Leitch	Tasmania	Scottsdale
David Clarke	Victoria	Geelong
Gary Dempsey	Victoria	Footscray
Gary Hardeman	Victoria	Melbourne
Alex Jesaulenko	Victoria	Carlton
Leigh Matthews	Victoria	Hawthorn
Peter McKenna	Victoria	Collingwood
Travis Payze	Victoria	St Kilda
Len Thompson	Victoria	Collingwood
David Thorpe	Victoria	Footscray
John Williams	Victoria	Essendon
Bob Beecroft	Western Australia	Swan Districts
Malcolm Brown	Western Australia	East Perth (captain)
Brian Ciccotosto	Western Australia	South Fremantle
Ken McAullay	Western Australia	East Perth
Ian Miller	Western Australia	Perth
Alan Watling	Western Australia	West Perth
George Young	Western Australia	Subiaco

==== 1969 ====
1969 All-Australian Team Adelaide Carnival
Name	State/League	Club
John Cahill	South Australia	Port Adelaide
Brian Colbey	South Australia	Glenelg
Peter Darley	South Australia	South Adelaide
Graham Molloy	South Australia	Norwood
Rick Schoff	South Australia	Sturt
Royce Hart	Victoria	Richmond
Peter Hudson	Victoria	Hawthorn
Alex Jesaulenko	Victoria	Carlton
Bob Keddie	Victoria	Hawthorn
Bob Murray	Victoria	St Kilda
John 'Sam' Newman	Victoria	Geelong
John Nicholls	Victoria	Carlton (captain)
Peter Steward	Victoria	North Melbourne
Terry Waters	Victoria	Collingwood
Ricky Watt	Victoria	Collingwood
Greg Brehaut	Western Australia	Perth
Barry Cable	Western Australia	Perth
Peter Eakins	Western Australia	Subiaco
John McIntosh	Western Australia	Claremont
Bill Walker	Western Australia	Swan Districts

==== 1966 ====
1966 All-Australian Team Hobart Carnival
Name	State/League	Club
Brenton Adcock	South Australia	Sturt
Robert Day	South Australia	West Adelaide
Rick Schoff	South Australia	Sturt
Peter Hudson	Tasmania	New Norfolk
Graeme Lee	Tasmania	Launceston
Darrel Baldock	Victoria	St Kilda (captain)
Ian Bryant	Victoria	Footscray
Neville Crowe	Victoria	Richmond
John Goold	Victoria	Carlton
Graeme John	Victoria	South Melbourne
Hassa Mann	Victoria	Melbourne
Denis Marshall	Victoria	Geelong
John Nicholls	Victoria	Carlton
Ian Stewart	Victoria	St Kilda
Noel Teasdale	Victoria	North Melbourne
Barry Cable	Western Australia	Perth
Keith Doncon	Western Australia	East Perth
John McIntosh	Western Australia	Claremont
Kevin Murray	Western Australia	East Perth
Brian Sarre	Western Australia	Subiaco

==== 1961 ====
1961 All-Australian Team Brisbane Carnival
Name	State/League	Club
John Abley	South Australia	Port Adelaide
John Halbert	South Australia	Sturt
Neil Kerley	South Australia	West Adelaide
Geoff Kingston	South Australia	West Torrens
Don Lindner	South Australia	North Adelaide
Don Roach	South Australia	West Adelaide
Bob Shearman	South Australia	West Torrens
Bill Wedding	South Australia	Norwood
Darrel Baldock	Tasmania	Latrobe
Bob Withers	Tasmania	North Launceston
Allen Aylett	Victoria	North Melbourne
Ron Barassi	Victoria	Melbourne (captain)
Brian Dixon	Victoria	Melbourne
John Schultz	Victoria	Footscray
Ted Whitten	Victoria	Footscray
Jack Clarke	Western Australia	East Fremantle
Graham Farmer	Western Australia	East Perth
Ray Gabelich	Western Australia	West Perth
Ray Sorrell	Western Australia	East Fremantle
John Todd	Western Australia	South Fremantle

==== 1958 ====
1958 All-Australian Team Melbourne Carnival
Name	State/League	Club
John Abley	South Australia	Port Adelaide
Donald Gale	Tasmania	Wynyard
Jim Ross	Tasmania	North Launceston
Stuart Spencer	Tasmania	Clarence
Barry Metcalfe	Victoria (VFA)	Mordialloc
Owen Abrahams	Victoria	Fitzroy
Allen Aylett	Victoria	North Melbourne
Ron Barassi	Victoria	Melbourne
Reg Burgess	Victoria	Essendon
Jack Clarke	Victoria	Essendon
Bob Davis	Victoria	Geelong (captain)
John Dugdale	Victoria	North Melbourne
Kevin Murray	Victoria	Fitzroy
Neil Roberts	Victoria	St Kilda
Ted Whitten	Victoria	Footscray
Jack Clarke	Western Australia	East Fremantle
Graham Farmer	Western Australia	East Perth
Alan Preen	Western Australia	East Fremantle
Norm Rogers	Western Australia	East Fremantle
Ray Sorrell	Western Australia	East Fremantle

==== 1956 ====
1956 All-Australian Team Perth Carnival
Name	State/League	Club
John Abley	South Australia	Port Adelaide
Haydn Bunton Jr.	South Australia	North Adelaide
Stan Costello	South Australia	West Adelaide
Lindsay Head	South Australia	West Torrens
Geoff Long	Tasmania	City
Barry Strange	Tasmania	New Town
Frank Johnson	Victoria (VFA)	Port Melbourne (captain)
Ron Barassi	Victoria	Melbourne
John Chick	Victoria	Carlton
Jack Clarke	Victoria	Essendon
Bill Hutchison	Victoria	Essendon
Peter Pianto	Victoria	Geelong
Des Rowe	Victoria	Richmond
Ted Whitten	Victoria	Footscray
Roy Wright	Victoria	Richmond
Jack Clarke	Western Australia	East Fremantle
Graham Farmer	Western Australia	East Perth
John Gerovich	Western Australia	South Fremantle
Keith Harper	Western Australia	Perth
Cliff Hillier	Western Australia	South Fremantle

==== 1953 ====
1953 All-Australian Team Adelaide Carnival
Name	State/League	Club
Neil Davies	South Australia	Glenelg
Len Fitzgerald	South Australia	Sturt
Bob Hank	South Australia	West Torrens
Jack Lynch	South Australia	West Adelaide
John Marriott	South Australia	Norwood
Clayton Thompson	South Australia	Sturt
John Leedham	Tasmania	North Launceston
Ted Henrys	Victoria (VFA)	Preston
Frank Johnson	Victoria (VFA)	Port Melbourne
Jack Clarke	Victoria	Essendon
John Coleman	Victoria	Essendon
Des Healey	Victoria	Collingwood
Jack Howell	Victoria	Carlton
Bill Hutchison	Victoria	Essendon
Bob Rose	Victoria	Collingwood
Bernie Smith	Victoria	Geelong
Jack Clarke	Western Australia	East Fremantle
Steve Marsh	Western Australia	South Fremantle
Merv McIntosh	Western Australia	Perth
Frank Sparrow	Western Australia	Swan Districts

=== Sporting Life Team of the Year: 1947–1955 ===
Sporting Life magazine created the concept of an All-Australian team in 1947.

These teams were once considered to be equivalent to All-Australian selection, but are no longer recognised as such.

==== 1955 ====
1955 Sporting Life Team of the Year
B:	Lerrel Sharp (Collingwood)	Herb Henderson (Footscray)	Norm Sharp (Geelong)
HB:	John James (Carlton)	Jim Taylor (Norwood)	Des Rowe (Richmond)
C:	Harold McDonald (Port Adelaide)	Lindsay Head (West Torrens)	Des Healey (Collingwood)
HF:	Barry White (South Fremantle)	Ray Poulter (Richmond)	Thorold Merrett (Collingwood)
F:	Jack Clarke (East Fremantle)	Noel O'Brien (Carlton)	Peter Pianto (Geelong)
Foll:	John Marriott (Norwood)	Denis Cordner (Melbourne)	Bill Hutchison (Essendon)

==== 1954 ====
1954 Sporting Life Team of the Year
B:	Wally Donald (Footscray)	Ken Caporn (Claremont)	John Marriott (Norwood)
HB:	Noel McMahen (Melbourne)	Laurie Kettlewell (Subiaco)	Jim Gallagher (Footscray)
C:	Jack Lynch (West Adelaide)	Ted Whitten (Footscray)	Keith Harper (Perth)
HF:	Jim Deane (Richmond)	John Brady (North Melbourne)	Bob Rose (Collingwood)
F:	Neil Mann (Collingwood)	Jack Collins (Footscray)	Peter Pianto (Geelong)
Foll:	Ken Hands (Carlton)	Roy Wright (Richmond)	Bill Hutchison (Essendon)

==== 1953 ====
1953 Sporting Life Team of the Year
B:	Bernie Smith (Geelong)	Herb Henderson (Footscray)	Merv McIntosh (Perth)
HB:	Jack Collins (Footscray)	Len Fitzgerald (Sturt)	Des Rowe (Richmond)
C:	Des Healey (Collingwood)	Jack Clarke (Essendon)	Jack Lynch (West Adelaide)
HF:	Bob Rose (Collingwood)	Jack Howell (Carlton)	Jim Deane (South Adelaide)
F:	Roy Wright (Richmond)	John Coleman (Essendon)	Peter Pianto (Geelong)
Foll:	Ken Hands (Carlton)	John Leedham (North Launceston)	Bill Hutchison (Essendon)

==== 1952 ====
1952 Sporting Life Team of the Year
B:	Wally May (Essendon)	Ian McKay (North Adelaide)	Bill Stephen (Fitzroy)
HB:	Frank Sparrow (East Perth)	Denis Cordner (Melbourne)	Don Taylor (Glenelg)
C:	Thorold Merrett (Collingwood)	Bob Hank (West Torrens) (captain)	Lyle Griffin (North Adelaide)
HF:	Bob Rose (Collingwood)	Len Fitzgerald (Sturt)	Jim Deane (South Adelaide)
F:	Roy Wright (Richmond)	John Coleman (Essendon)	Bill Hutchison (Essendon)
Foll:	John Marriott (Norwood)	Frank Johnson (Port Melbourne)	Steve Marsh (South Fremantle)

==== 1951 ====
1951 Sporting Life Team of the Year
B:	John Marriott (Norwood)	Ian McKay (North Adelaide)	Charlie Sutton (Footscray)
HB:	Harold McDonald (Port Adelaide)	Brian Faehse (West Adelaide)	Fred Buttsworth (West Perth)
C:	Arthur Hodgson (Carlton)	Bob Rose (Collingwood)	Lyle Griffin (North Adelaide)
HF:	Bob Davis (Geelong)	Ron Clegg (South Melbourne)	Jim Deane (South Adelaide)
F:	Allan Crabb (Glenelg)	John Coleman (Essendon)	Fos Williams (Port Adelaide)
Foll:	Bill Morris (Richmond)	Jack Whelan (Brunswick)	Bill Hutchison (Essendon)

==== 1950 ====
1950 Sporting Life Team of the Year
B:	Dick Russell (Port Adelaide)	Bill Brittingham (Essendon)	Merv McIntosh (Perth)
HB:	Charlie Sutton (Footscray)	Don Fraser (Richmond)	Gordon Hocking (Collingwood)
C:	Arthur Hodgson (Carlton)	Bob Hank (West Torrens)	Doug Olds (Norwood)
HF:	Bob Davis (Geelong)	Fred Flanagan (Geelong)	Len Dockett (Melbourne)
F:	John Marriott (Norwood)	John Coleman (Essendon)	Fos Williams (Port Adelaide)
Foll:	Bill Morris (Richmond) (captain)	Jack Whelan (Brunswick)	Bill Hutchison (Essendon)

==== 1949 ====
1949 Sporting Life Team of the Year
B:	Charlie Sutton (Footscray)	Shane McGrath (Melbourne)	Don Cordner (Melbourne)
HB:	Marcel Hilsz (Perth)	Bert Deacon (Carlton)	Ron Clegg (South Melbourne)
C:	Des Healey (Collingwood)	Ern Henfry (Carlton)	Stan Heal (West Perth)
HF:	Bob Hank (West Torrens)	Fred Flanagan (Geelong)	Les Foote (North Melbourne)
F:	Bill Morris (Richmond)	John Coleman (Essendon)	Jack Sheedy (East Fremantle)
Foll:	Jack Howell (Carlton)	Merv McIntosh (Perth)	Steve Marsh (South Fremantle)

==== 1948 ====
1948 Sporting Life Team of the Year
B:	Charlie Sutton (Footscray)	Shane McGrath (Melbourne)	Bob McClure (Essendon)
HB:	Marcel Hilsz (Perth)	Bert Deacon (Carlton)	Len Fitzgerald (Collingwood)
C:	Stan Heal (West Perth)	Bill Twomey Jr. (Collingwood)	Noel Jarvis (Fitzroy)
HF:	Bill Hutchison (Essendon)	Jack Howell (Carlton)	Bob Hank (West Torrens)
F:	Bill Morris (Richmond)	Lindsay White (Geelong)	Lou Richards (Collingwood)
Foll:	Merv McIntosh (Perth)	Les McClements (Claremont)	Jack Sheedy (East Fremantle)

==== 1947 ====
1947 Sporting Life Team of the Year
B:	Max Oppy (Richmond)	Shane McGrath (Melbourne)	Percy Bushby (Essendon)
HB:	Wally Lock (Melbourne)	Wally Buttsworth (Essendon)	Bert Deacon (Carlton)
C:	Sam Gallagher (Norwood)	Ern Henfry (Carlton)	Billy King (South Melbourne)
HF:	Bill Hutchison (Essendon)	Gordon Lane (Essendon)	Bob Hank (West Torrens)
F:	Jack Howell (Carlton)	Fred Fanning (Melbourne)	Lou Richards (Collingwood)
Foll:	Merv McIntosh (Perth)	Don Cordner (Melbourne)	Bob Quinn (Port Adelaide) (captain)

== Records ==
=== Players ===
==== Most times selected overall ====
Selections	Player	Teams
9	Max Gawn	2016, 2018, 2019, 2020, 2021 (c), 2022, 2024, 2025, 2026 (c)
8	Robert Harvey	1992, 1994, 1995, 1996, 1997, 1998, 1999, 2003
8	Mark Ricciuto	1994, 1997, 1998, 2000, 2002, 2003, 2004 (c), 2005 (c)
8	Gary Ablett Jr.	2007, 2008, 2009, 2010 (vc), 2011 (c), 2012 (vc), 2013 (vc), 2014
8	Lance Franklin	2008, 2010, 2011, 2012, 2014, 2016, 2017, 2018 (c)
8	Patrick Dangerfield	2012, 2013, 2015, 2016, 2017, 2018 (vc), 2019, 2020 (c)
8	Marcus Bontempelli	2016, 2019, 2020, 2021 (vc), 2023 (vc), 2024 (c), 2025, 2026
7	Craig Bradley	1983, 1985, 1986, 1993, 1994, 1995, 1997
7	Paul Roos	1985, 1987, 1988, 1991 (c), 1992 (c), 1996, 1997
7	Wayne Carey	1993 (c), 1994, 1995, 1996, 1998 (c), 1999 (c), 2000 (c)
7	Nathan Buckley	1996, 1997, 1998, 1999, 2000, 2001, 2003 (vc)

==== Most times selected in Carnivals era ====
Selections	Player	Teams
4	Jack K. "Stork" Clarke	1953, 1956, 1958, 1961
3	Jack E. Clarke	1953, 1956, 1958
3	John Abley	1956, 1958, 1961
3	Ron Barassi	1956, 1958, 1961 (c)
3	Polly Farmer	1956, 1958, 1961
3	Ted Whitten	1956, 1958, 1961

==== Most captaincies ====
Selections	Player	Teams
4	Wayne Carey	1993, 1998, 1999, 2000
3	Joel Selwood	2013, 2014, 2016
2	Brian Peake	1979, 1986
2	Paul Roos	1991, 1992
2	Paul Kelly	1996, 1997
2	Michael Voss	2002, 2003
2	Mark Ricciuto	2004, 2005
2	Max Gawn	2021, 2026

=== Coaches ===
==== Most times selected overall ====
Selections	Coach	Teams
4	Alastair Clarkson	2008, 2013, 2014, 2015
3	Kevin Sheedy	1985, 1993, 2000
3	Leigh Matthews	2001, 2002, 2003
3	Damien Hardwick	2017, 2019, 2020
2	Graham Cornes	1987, 1988
2	Chris Fagan	2024, 2025
2	Mark Thompson	2007, 2009
2	Mick Malthouse	1991, 2010
2	Chris Scott	2011, 2022

=== Selected as both player and coach ===
Total selections	Name	Selection/s as player	Selection/s as coach
8	Paul Roos	1985, 1987, 1988, 1991 (c), 1992 (c), 1996, 1997	2005
6	Simon Goodwin	2000, 2001, 2005, 2006, 2009	2021
4	Graham Cornes	1979, 1980	1987, 1988
4	Leigh Matthews	1972	2001, 2002, 2003
4	Damien Hardwick	2000	2017, 2019, 2020
3	Barry Cable	1966, 1969	1979
2	John Todd	1961	1983
2	Terry Wallace	1988	1998
2	Mark Williams	1980	2004
2	Adam Simpson	2002	2018

== See also ==
- AFL Women's All-Australian team
