= 1980 Adelaide State of Origin Carnival =

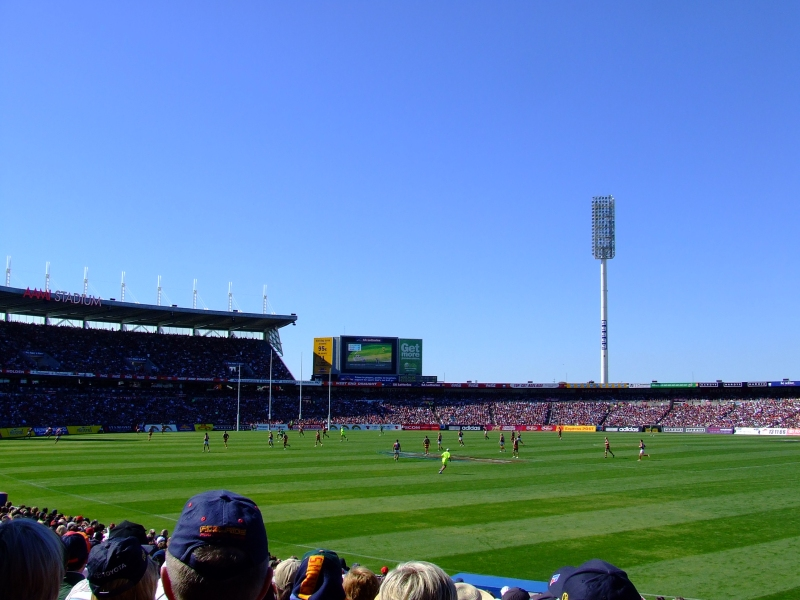
- Football Park where all matches were played

Tournament information
- Sport: Australian football
- Location: Adelaide, Australia
- Dates: 11 October 1980–13 October 1980
- Format: Knockout
- Teams: 4

Final champion
- Victoria

The 1980 Adelaide State of Origin Carnival was the 21st Australian National Football Carnival, an Australian football competition. It was the second carnival to take place under the State of Origin format.

Four states took part, the hosts South Australia, Tasmania, Victoria and the reigning carnival champions Western Australia. Football Park hosted all the fixtures, which took place in October after the football season had ended.

== Results ==
Game	Winning team	Winning team score	Losing team	Losing team score	Ground	Crowd	Date
Semi Final 1	South Australia	22.18 (150)	Tasmania	8.13 (61)	Football Park	10,666	11 October 1980
Semi Final 2	Victoria	14.20 (104)	Western Australia	9.15 (69)	Football Park	10,666 (double-header)	11 October 1980
3rd Place Final	Western Australia	17.23 (125)	Tasmania	12.18 (90)	Football Park	17,579	13 October 1980
Grand Final	Victoria	15.12 (102)	South Australia	12.13 (85)	Football Park	17,579 (double-header)	13 October 1980

== Squads ==
South Australia

Coach: Neil Kerley 
Captain: Rick Davies(Sturt)

- Bruce Abernethy (Port Adelaide)
- Darrell Cahill (Port Adelaide)
- Peter Carey (Glenelg)
- Graham Cornes (Glenelg)
- Phil Heinrich (Sturt)
- Trevor Hill (North Adelaide)
- Max James (South Melbourne)
- Peter Jonas (North Melbourne)
- Dexter Kennedy (West Adelaide)
- Robbert Klomp (Carlton)
- Keith Kuhlmann (Glenelg)
- Jim Lihou (Glenelg)
- Kevin McSporran (West Torrens)
- Greg Phillips (Port Adelaide)
- John Roberts (South Melbourne)
- Michael Taylor (Norwood)
- Mark Williams (Port Adelaide)
- Russell Ebert (Port Adelaide)
- Phillip Galleghar (Norwood)
- Phil Maylin (Carlton)
- Ralph Sewer (Woodville)
- Paul Weston (Glenelg)
- Andy Bennett (Hawthorn)
Tasmania

Coach: Peter Daniel 
Captain: Darryl Sutton(North Melbourne)

- Stephen Carey (Essendon)
- Noel Carter (South Fremantle)
- Neil Cummins (Devonport)
- Craig Davis (Collingwood)
- Alex Downes (North Launceston)
- Robert Dykes (Glenorchy)
- Rodney Eade (Hawthorn)
- Kerry Good (North Melbourne)
- Peter Hamilton (Melbourne)
- Michael Hunnibell (New Norfolk)
- Des James (Sandy Bay)
- Gary Linton (Glenorchy)
- Phil Manassa (Davenport)
- Ian Marsh (Essendon)
- Don McLeod (North Hobart)
- Dan Munnings (New Norfolk or Richmond)
- Chris Reynolds (Burnie)
- Colin Robertson (Hawthorn)
- Michael Roach (Richmond)
- Denis Scanlon (Richmond)
- Robert Shaw (Essendon)
- Ron Stubbs (Davenport)
- Scott Wade (Hawthorn)
- Mark Williams (Davenport)
Victoria

Coach: Tom Hafey 
Captain: Kevin Bartlett(Richmond)

- Rod Blake (Geelong)
- Terry Bright (Geelong)
- Mark Browning (South Melbourne)
- David Clarke (Geelong)
- Terry Daniher (Essendon)
- Jeff Dunne (St. Kilda)
- Ian Dunstan (Footscray)
- Robert Flower (Melbourne)
- Jim Jess (Richmond)
- Mark Lee (Richmond)
- Michael Moncrieff (Hawthorn)
- Kelvin Moore (Hawthorn)
- Peter Moore (Collingwood)
- Bruce Nankervis (Geelong)
- Ian Nankervis (Geelong)
- Merv Neagle (Essendon)
- Billy Picken (Collingwood)
- Geoff Raines (Collingwood)
- Ken Sheldon (Carlton)
- Geoff Southby (Carlton)
- Kelvin Templeton (Footscray)
- Michael Turner (Geelong)
- Tim Watson (Essendon)
- Dale Weightman (Richmond)
- Garry Wilson (Fitzroy)
West Australia

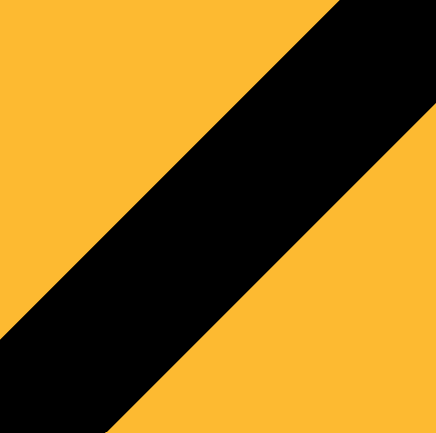

Coach: Brad Smith 
Captain: Brian Peake(East Fremantle)

- Ron Alexander (Fitzroy)
- Paul Arnold (East Perth)
- Basil Campbell (South Fremantle)
- Brian Cook (Subiaco)
- Stephen Curtis (East Perth)
- Bruce Duperouzel (St. Kilda)
- Peter Featherby (Geelong)
- Mike Fitzpatrick (Carlton)
- Les Fong (West Perth)
- Ross Glendinning (North Melbourne)
- Doug Green (South Melbourne)
- Ken Hunter (Claremont)
- Ken Judge (East Fremantle)
- Phil Krakouer (Claremont)
- Joe McKay (South Fremantle)
- Graham Moss (Claremont)
- Ross Prunster (West Perth)
- Mike Richardson (Swan Districts)
- Maurice Rioli (South Fremantle)
- Garry Sidebottom (St. Kilda)
- Mike Smith (Swan Districts)
- Peter Spencer (East Perth)
- Benny Vigona (South Fremantle)
- Robert Wiley (Richmond)

== Honours ==
=== All-Australians ===
At the completion of the tournament, the All-Australian team was named, based on performances during the carnival.

1980 State of Origin Carnival Team
B:	Ian Nankervis (Vic, Geelong)	Keith Kuhlmann (SA, Glenelg)	Geoff Southby (Vic, Carlton)
HB:	Ken Hunter (WA, Claremont)	Greg Phillips (SA, Port Adelaide)	Robbert Klomp (SA, Carlton)
C:	Robert Flower (Vic, Melbourne)	Geoff Raines (Vic, Richmond)	Brian Peake (WA, East Fremantle)
HF:	Darryl Sutton (Tas, North Melbourne)	Rick Davies (captain) (SA, Sturt)	Jim Jess (Vic, Richmond)
F:	Bruce Duperouzel (WA, St Kilda)	John Roberts (SA, South Melbourne)	Peter Carey (SA, Glenelg)
Foll:	Mark Lee (Vic, Richmond)	Graham Cornes (SA, Glenelg)	Garry Wilson (Vic, Fitzroy)
Int:	Mark Williams (SA, Port Adelaide)	Ron Stubbs (Tas, Devonport)	
Coach:	Tom Hafey (Vic, Collingwood)		

=== Leading goal-kickers ===
- John Roberts (SA) - 9 goals
- Kelvin Templeton (VIC) - 6 goals
- Ken Judge (WA) - 5 goals
- Garry Sidebottom (WA) - 5 goals

=== Tassie Medalist ===
- Graham Cornes (SA)
