= 1956 Perth Carnival =

13th Edition of Australian National Football Carnival

Tournament information
- Sport: Australian football
- Location: Perth, Australia
- Dates: 11 June 1956–23 June 1956
- Format: Round Robin
- Teams: 5

Final champion
- Victoria

The 1956 Perth Carnival was the 13th edition of the Australian National Football Carnival, an Australian football interstate competition. It took place from 11 to 23 June at Subiaco Oval, Perth.

Five teams automatically qualified for the carnival as a result of their finishing positions at the 1953 Adelaide Carnival: two Victorian teams Victoria (VFL) and Victoria (VFA), the hosts Western Australia, South Australia &. Tasmania, which had finished last at the 1953 Carnival, qualified only after defeating the winners of the lower division, the Australian Amateurs, in a playoff at North Hobart Oval on 10 July 1954, by the score of 16.21 (117) to 9.10 (64).

Victoria finished the fortnight unbeaten while Tasmania equaled their best performance ever by finishing third.

== Results ==
Game One

| Team | Score |
|---|---|
| South Australia | 16.14 (110) |
| Victoria (VFA) | 11.10 (76) |

Game Three

| Team | Score |
|---|---|
| Victoria (VFL) | 21.17 (143) |
| Victoria (VFA) | 3.5 (23) |

Game Five

| Team | Score |
|---|---|
| Tasmania | 27.22 (184) |
| Victoria (VFA) | 12.12 (84) |

Game Seven

| Team | Score |
|---|---|
| Western Australia | 22.20 (152) |
| Victoria (VFA) | 9.15 (69) |

Game Nine

| Team | Score |
|---|---|
| Tasmania | 10.20 (80) |
| South Australia | 8.19 (67) |

Game Two

| Team | Score |
|---|---|
| Western Australia | 14.19 (103) |
| Tasmania | 11.14 (80) |

Game Four

| Team | Score |
|---|---|
| Western Australia | 11.9 (75) |
| South Australia | 9.10 (64) |

Game Six

| Team | Score |
|---|---|
| Victoria (VFL) | 14.27 (111) |
| South Australia | 9.7 (61) |

Game Eight

| Team | Score |
|---|---|
| Victoria (VFL) | 22.19 (151) |
| Tasmania | 14.6 (90) |

Game Ten

| Team | Score |
|---|---|
| Victoria (VFL) | 20.17 (137) |
| Western Australia | 9.19 (73) |

== All-Australian team ==
In 1956 the All-Australian team was picked based on the performances at the Perth Carnival.

1956 All-Australian Team Perth Carnival
| Name | State/League | Club |
|---|---|---|
| John Abley | South Australia | Port Adelaide |
| Haydn Bunton, Jr | South Australia | North Adelaide |
| Stan Costello | South Australia | West Adelaide |
| Lindsay Head | South Australia | West Torrens |
| Geoff Long | Tasmania | City |
| Barry Strange | Tasmania | New Town |
| Frank Johnson | Victoria (VFA) | Port Melbourne (captain) |
| Ron Barassi | Victoria | Melbourne |
| John Chick | Victoria | Carlton |
| Jack Clarke | Victoria | Essendon |
| Bill Hutchison | Victoria | Essendon |
| Peter Pianto | Victoria | Geelong |
| Des Rowe | Victoria | Richmond |
| Ted Whitten | Victoria | Footscray |
| Roy Wright | Victoria | Richmond |
| Jack Clarke | Western Australia | East Fremantle |
| Graham Farmer | Western Australia | East Perth |
| John Gerovich | Western Australia | South Fremantle |
| Keith Harper | Western Australia | Perth |
| Cliff Hillier | Western Australia | South Fremantle |

== Tassie Medal ==
Ruckman Graham Farmer won the Tassie Medal, making it four wins out of five in carnivals for Western Australian players.

| Ranking | Player | Votes | |
|---|---|---|---|
| 1 | Graham Farmer | 6 | Western Australia |
| 2 | Ron Barassi | 4 | Victoria |
| 2 | Peter Pianto | 4 | Victoria |

== Goalkicking ==
| Ranking | Player | Goals | Team |
|---|---|---|---|
| 1 | Jock Spencer | 17 | Victoria |
| 2 | Noel Clarke | 15 | Tasmania |
| 3 | John Gerovich | 13 | Western Australia |
| 4 | Lindsay Head | 12 | South Australia |
