= Jack Whelan (disambiguation) =

Jack Whelan is Australian rules footballer.

Jack Whelan may also refer to:

- Jack Whelan (pool player), winner of the IPA World Blackball Champion in 2015
- Jack Whelan, character in Intruders (TV series)
- Jack F. Whelan, survivor of a rare blood cancer who became a well-known advocate of cancer research

== See also ==
- John Whelan (disambiguation)
