= Alan Rait =

Australian rules footballer

Personal information
- Full name: Alan Edward Rait
- Born: 9 November 1908; Glebe, Tasmania
- Died: 24 March 1965 (aged 56)
- Original team: North Hobart
- Height: 183 cm (6 ft 0 in)
- Weight: 81 kg (179 lb)

Playing career^{1}
Years	Club	Games (Goals)
1933–1934	Footscray	19 (62)
- ^{1} Playing statistics correct to the end of 1934.

Alan Edward Rait (9 November 1908 – 24 March 1965) was an Australian rules footballer who played for Footscray in the Victorian Football League (VFL). He also played with North Hobart in the TANFL, kicking 847 goals and topping the league's goal-kicking eight times.

== Family ==
The son of James Fulton Rait (1880–1946) and Florence Agnes Green (1876–1969), Alan Edward Rait was born in the Hobart suburb of Glebe on 9 November 1908.

== Football ==
A full-forward, Rait began his career with North Hobart in 1927. He kicked over 100 goals in a season for the first time in 1929 and kicked a league record of 152 goals the following season. The record stood until 1976 when it was broken by Peter Hudson. Rait's efforts in 1930 were rewarded with selection for Tasmania at the Adelaide Carnival.

Rait went to the mainland in 1933 and joined Footscray in the VFL. In his debut season he kicked 59 goals which saw him top Footscray's goal-kicking. He managed just 4 games in 1934 before an injury forced him to leave the club.

He returned to play for North Hobart and topped the league's goal-kicking table for the years 1935, 1936 and 1937.
