= Neville Linney =

Australian rules footballer

Personal information
- Full name: Neville Oliver Linney
- Born: 1 July 1933
- Died: 9 May 1985 (aged 51)
- Original team: Malvern Grammar
- Height: 182 cm (6 ft 0 in)
- Weight: 82 kg (181 lb)

Playing career^{1}
Years	Club	Games (Goals)
1953–1957	St Kilda	43 (16)
- ^{1} Playing statistics correct to the end of 1957.

Neville Oliver Linney (1 July 1933 – 9 May 1985) was an Australian rules footballer who played with St Kilda in the Victorian Football League (VFL) during the 1950s.

Recruited from Malvern Grammar, Linney was primarily a half back flanker, but was also used up forward on occasions. He had an immediate impact on the VFL scene in 1953 and was selected to represent the league in the Adelaide Carnival that year, which he returned from with bronchitis. In what would be his penultimate league appearance, Linney had the unusual distinction of kicking his team's only goal, as St Kilda managed only 1.5 (11) against Melbourne, the third-lowest VFL/AFL score since 1916. He then kicked five goals in his last ever game for St Kilda, a win over Collingwood at Junction Oval in 1957.

Linney, who had prior convictions, was sent to jail in 1961 for a period of two years, after going to court over a break and enter into a South Yarra shop. He pleaded guilty to the charges of shopbreaking and stealing. In 1966 he was again in court, this time charged with assault and attempted robbery on a woman in a dry cleaning shop.
