= Bruce Duperouzel =

Australian rules footballer

Personal information
- Born: 21 April 1950 (age 76); Northam, Western Australia
- Original team: Claremont (WANFL)
- Height: 174 cm (5 ft 9 in)
- Weight: 74 kg (163 lb)
- Position: rover

Playing career^{1}
Years	Club	Games (Goals)
1969–1973	Claremont	86 (147)
1974–1982	St Kilda	139 (160)
1983–1984	Footscray	25 (24)
Total		250 (331)
- ^{1} Playing statistics correct to the end of 1984.

Career highlights
- Claremont leading goalkicker 1971; Claremont Best and Fairest 1971; St Kilda leading goalkicker 1974; All-Australian team 1980; St Kilda captain 1981–1982

Bruce Duperouzel (born 21 April 1950) is a former Australian rules footballer and cricketer. Duperouzel started his football career with Claremont in the WANFL, and later played for St Kilda and Footscray in the VFL.

Duperouzel was born in Northam, Western Australia and grew up in York before playing 86 games as a rover at Claremont in five seasons, winning their 1971 fairest and best award. He represented WA in five first-class cricket matches from 1971–72 to 1972–73.

He joined St Kilda in 1974 and finished that season as their leading goalkicker with 28 goals. He was their top vote getter in the 1980 Brownlow Medal and in the same year earned All-Australian selection while representing Western Australia at the Adelaide State of Origin Carnival, one of six times that he would play for them. For the second half of the 1981 season and all of 1982, Duperouzel was the Saints' captain. He crossed to Footscray in 1983 where he played a further two VFL seasons.
