= Barry Strange =

Australian rules footballer

Personal information
- Full name: Barry George Strange
- Born: 13 May 1934
- Died: 24 June 2007 (aged 73)
- Position: Centre half back

Playing career^{1}
Years	Club	Games (Goals)
1952–57, 1961–66	New Town/Glenorchy	167
1958–60	Penguin	45
- ^{1} Playing statistics correct to the end of 1966.

Barry George Strange (13 May 1934 – 24 June 2007) was an Australian rules footballer who played for New Town, later Glenorchy, in the Tasmanian Australian National Football League (TANFL). He is a member of the Tasmanian Football Hall of Fame after being inducted in 2005 and is a centre half back in Glenorchy's official 'Team of the Century'.

It was at centre half back that Strange played most of his football and he began his career at New Town in 1952. A dual Best and fairest winner, he was a member of New Town's 1953, 1955 and 1956 premiership sides before crossing to Penguin as captain-coach in 1958. Strange spent three seasons at the NWFU club then returned to New Town, who had been renamed Glenorchy, and played in another premiership in 1965. His final season was 1966.

Strange represented Tasmania in 10 interstate matches and was an All-Australian for his efforts at the 1956 Perth Carnival. He also participated in Tasmania's famous upset victory over the VFL at Launceston in 1960.
