= Ron Stubbs =

Australian rules footballer

Personal information
- Born: 3 October 1948 (age 78)
- Original team: Carrum
- Height: 194 cm (6 ft 4 in)
- Weight: 92 kg (203 lb)
- Position: Ruck

Playing career^{1}
Years	Club	Games (Goals)
1969–1972	Hawthorn	17 (5)
- ^{1} Playing statistics correct to the end of 1972.

Ron Stubbs (born 3 October 1948) is a former Australian rules footballer who played for Hawthorn in the VFL.

== Biography ==
Stubbs spent a lot of time in the Hawthorn reserves and managed only 17 senior games during his four seasons. Six of them came early in the 1971 season, a premiership year for Hawthorn.

Ron was a much respected player for Carrum, who at that time played in the MPFL. He played for Carrum before his Hawthorn time and afterwards. He was a member of the 1973 and 1974 Premiership teams. (In the image of the 1974 team, he is in the back row, 7th from the left). Ron was the Best and Fairest in the MPFL in 1968 and 1975. He was also Best and Fairest at Carrum in 1967, 68, 73, 75, 79 and 81.

He finished his career in Tasmania and played with Devonport in the North West Football Union. He represented the state at the 1980 Adelaide State of Origin Carnival and was selected in the All-Australian team.
