= Neil Davies (Australian footballer) =

Australian rules footballer and coach

Personal information
- Full name: Frederick Neil Davies
- Born: 9 December 1931; Broken Hill, New South Wales
- Died: 23 February 2009 (aged 77)
- Original team: Balmain / Central Broken Hill
- Height: 185 cm (6 ft 1 in)
- Weight: 84 kg (185 lb)
- Position: Centre

Playing career^{1}
Years	Club	Games (Goals)
1951–1954, 1956–1963	Glenelg	143 (105)
1955	Richmond	2 (1)
Total		145 (106)
- ^{1} Playing statistics correct to the end of 1963.

Career highlights
- Glenelg Best and fairest 1953, 1956

Neil Davies (9 December 1931 – 23 February 2009) was an Australian rules footballer who played in four states, but most notably for Glenelg in the South Australian National Football League (SANFL). He also had a stint with Victorian Football League (VFL) club Richmond.

Originally from Broken Hill, Davies started his SANFL career in 1951 and played mainly as a centreman. In his debut season, despite having only three games experience, he represented South Australia in a match against the Victorian Football Association (VFA). He would go on to represent his adopted state on 20 occasions in total, including the 1953 Adelaide Carnival where he was an All-Australian. His best season for Glenelg came in 1953 SANFL season

Davies joined Richmond in 1955 but managed just two senior appearances, against Essendon and Footscray. He felt that he was receiving harsh treatment from the club and quit, moving to the Northern Territory where he would play in the Northern Territory Football League (NTFL). He captain-coached Darwin's St Mary's to the 1955/56 premiership and was a Nichols Medalist.

He briefly flirted with a rugby league career and spent a winter in England before returning to Australian rules football and Glenelg for the 1956 season. In his first year back he won another 'Best and fairest' as well as topping the Tigers' goal kicking. Davies was appointed club captain in 1957 and his leadership role was expanded to captain-coach the following season. After steering Glenelg to a Preliminary Final in 1959 he opted to concentrate on his football and passed on the captaincy and coaching. He played his last SANFL game in 1963 and finished with 143 games for the club.

The fourth and final state of Davies football career was Queensland and from 1964 to 1967 he played for Western Districts. He even represented Queensland's interstate team.

In 2002 he was named in Glenelg's Hall of Fame and the same year was one of the inaugural inductees into the South Australian Football Hall of Fame.
