= Jim Wright (Australian footballer) =

Australian rules footballer

Personal information
- Full name: James Wright
- Nickname: Jim Wright
- Born: 26 September 1949 (age 77)
- Original team: North Hobart

Playing career^{1}
Years	Club	Games (Goals)
1970 — 1972	Geelong	20 (5)
- ^{1} Playing statistics correct to the end of 1972.

James Wright (born 26 September 1949), more commonly known as Jim Wright, is a former Australian rules footballer who played for Geelong in the Victorian Football League (now known as the Australian Football League).
