= John Leedham =

Australian rules footballer and coach (1928–2020)

John L. Leedham (20 May 1928 – 29 May 2020) was an Australian rules footballer who is the vice captain of and ruck-rover in the official Tasmanian Football Team of the Century. He is a 'legend' in the state's Football Hall of Fame and was inducted into the Australian Football Hall of Fame in 2025.

Leedham, nicknamed 'John L', always played with his socks down and was known to be a colourful character on the field. He was brought up in Campbell Town and started his football career at North Launceston in 1946, aged 17. Playing as a centre half forward, Leedham was a member of NTFA premiership teams in 1946, 1948, 1949 and 1950 as well as three Tasmanian State Premierships. He was almost poached by the Melbourne Football Club in 1948 but a knee injury stopped him from making his debut in the VFL.

After 124 games with North Launceston, including a stint as captain-coach, Leedham crossed to TFL club North Hobart. He coached North Hobart from 1954 to 1959 and steered them to a premiership in 1957.

Leedham represented Tasmania at the 1947, 1953 and 1958 interstate carnivals. In 1953 he was the only Tasmanian named in the inaugural All-Australian side and in 1958 he captain-coached the state to famous wins against South Australia and Western Australia.
