= Frank Johnson (footballer, born 1932) =

Australian rules footballer (1932–2016)

- Johnson during his South Melbourne career

Personal information
- Full name: Francis Charles Johnson
- Born: 3 July 1932
- Died: 9 July 2016 (aged 84); Melbourne
- Original team: Port Melbourne YMCA
- Height: 189 cm (6 ft 2 in)
- Weight: 84 kg (185 lb)
- Position: Ruckman

Playing career^{1}
Years	Club	Games (Goals)
1950–1957	Port Melbourne	165 (52)
1960–1964	South Melbourne	64 (38)
- ^{1} Playing statistics correct to the end of 1964.

Career highlights
- J. J. Liston Trophy 1952; 2× All-Australian 1953, 1956; VFA premiership player 1953; Port Melbourne best and fairest 1951, 1952, 1954, 1955, 1956; Port Melbourne captain-coach 1956–1957; South Melbourne best and fairest 1960

Francis Charles "Frank" Johnson (3 July 1932 – 9 July 2016) was an Australian rules footballer who played for the South Melbourne Football Club in the Victorian Football League (VFL) and Port Melbourne in the Victorian Football Association (VFA).

== Career ==
A 185 cm ruckman, Johnson began his senior career playing with Port Melbourne in the VFA in the 1950s. He won a record five best and fairest awards at Port Melbourne, in an era where the team reached eight consecutive grand finals (winning only once). He won the J. J. Liston Trophy for his efforts during the 1952 season and twice earned All-Australian selection: the first time was in the 1953 Adelaide Carnival where he was named in what was the inaugural All-Australian team, and he was selected as captain in the 1956 Perth Carnival team. He was the only VFA player to be twice selected, and the only to be selected as captain, in the All-Australian team.

After eight seasons with Port Melbourne, Johnson moved to the South Warrnambool Football Club in the Hampden Football League, where he was playing coach in 1958 and 1959. In 1960, at the age of 29, he joined VFL club South Melbourne. He had immediate success by winning the club's best and fairest, and finishing fourth in the Brownlow Medal count the following year.

== Honours ==
Johnson is widely acknowledged as one of the VFA's all-time star players. In 2007, Johnson was inducted into the Australian Football Hall of Fame; excluding players from the era before the VFL broke away from the VFA in 1897, he was the first inductee ever to have his VFA career acknowledged in his Hall of Fame citation, and until Ron Todd's induction in 2017 was the only inductee who played the majority of his career in the VFA. The Frank Johnson Medal, named in his honour, is awarded by the Victorian Football League to its best player in each interstate representative match. He was named as captain of the Port Melbourne Team of the Century.
