= John Munro (sportsman) =

Australian sportsman

Personal information
- Full name: John Knox Ewing Munro
- Born: 27 December 1928; Perth, Western Australia
- Died: 16 August 2013 (aged 84); Rockingham, Western Australia
- Batting: Right-handed
- Role: Wicket-keeper

Domestic team information
- Years: Team
- 1948/49–1954/55: Western Australia

Career statistics
Competition	First-class
Matches	26
Runs scored	497
Batting average	11.55
100s/50s	0/1
Top score	53*
Balls bowled	48
Wickets	1
Bowling average	18.00
5 wickets in innings	0
10 wickets in match	0
Best bowling	1/18
Catches/stumpings	56/4
- Source: CricketArchive

John Knox Ewing Munro (27 December 1928 – 16 August 2013) was an Australian sportsman who represented Western Australia in both first-class cricket and Australian rules football. He played for the Western Australia cricket team in the Sheffield Shield and for Claremont Football Club in the West Australian National Football League (WANFL).

Munro made his first-class cricket debut in the 1948/49 Sheffield Shield season and remained Western Australia's favoured wicket-keeper until 1954/55. He took five first-innings catches against South Australia in the 1951/52 Sheffield Shield season, a career best. Although he usually batted low down the order, he did once make 53 not out, his highest score, against the touring New Zealanders at the WACA in March 1954.

As a footballer, Munro was a regular fixture at centre half forward for Western Australia during the early 1950s, appearing in eight interstate matches. He took part in the 1953 Adelaide Carnival. At club level, Munro played for Claremont and replaced Gordon Maffina as club captain in 1954. Munro, who retired in 1958, appeared in a total of 118 WANFL matches and kicked 100 goals.
