= Ted Collis =

Australian rules footballer (1921–1971)

Personal information
- Full name: Edward Alfred Collis
- Born: 12 June 1921; Hobart, Tasmania
- Died: 3 March 1971 (aged 49); Hawthorn, Victoria
- Original team: North Hobart
- Height: 184 cm (6 ft 0 in)
- Weight: 89 kg (196 lb)
- Position: Full Forward

Playing career^{1}
Years	Club	Games (Goals)
1946	Hawthorn	9 (12)
- ^{1} Playing statistics correct to the end of 1946.

Edward Alfred Collis (12 June 1921 – 3 March 1971) was an Australian rules footballer who played with Hawthorn in the Victorian Football League (VFL).

== Family ==
The son of Thomas William Collis (1896–1955), and Auriel Annie Collis (1892–1973), Edward Alfred Collis was born at Hobart, Tasmania on 12 June 1921.

== Football ==
"Ted Collis, the Tasmanian at Hawthorn, is unorthodox in his kicking methods. Shooting for goal at an angle last night, he kicked eight through from 10 shots. He held the ball side on, and it went through like a boomerang." — The Argus, 3 May 1946.

=== North Hobart ===
With the TANFL competition resuming in 1945, Collis played for a season under ex-Geelong captain-coach, Jack Metherell, at the North Hobart Football Club and was the TANFL's leading goalkicker.

=== Hawthorn (VFL) ===
At the end of 1945 Collis moved to Melbourne and played the 1946 year with Hawthorn. He played 9 games and kicked 12 goals.

== Death ==
He died at Hawthorn, Victoria on 3 March 1971.
