= Jack Lynch (West Adelaide footballer) =

Australian rules footballer (1929–2018)

Personal information
- Full name: John Arnold Lynch
- Died: 31 December 2018 (aged 89)
- Position: Wing

Playing career^{1}
Years	Club	Games (Goals)
1948–58	West Adelaide	147 (14)
- ^{1} Playing statistics correct to the end of 1958.

Career highlights
- SANFL debut with West Adelaide on 22 May 1948; West Adelaide Sam Suckling Medal winner 1948 (best first year player); The Advertiser Team of the Year 1952, 1953, 1954; West Adelaide Best & Fairest 1952; 16 State games for South Australia; All-Australian 1953; South Australian State Selector 1967; West Adelaide Football Club Hall of Fame Inaugural Inductee 2005; South Australian Football Hall of Fame Inductee 2006

John Arnold Lynch (1929 – 31 December 2018) was an Australian rules footballer who played with West Adelaide in the South Australian National Football League (SANFL) from 1948 until he retired after the 1958 season.

Lynch, a dashing wingman, started out at West Adelaide in 1948 by winning the Sam Sucking Medal as the club's best first year player and he went on to win West's Best & Fairest award in 1952. During his time with West Adelaide, Lynch played in three losing Grand Finals, all to Port Adelaide (1954, 1956 and 1958).

Lynch was also a strong performer at interstate level, representing South Australia in 16 matches and earning All-Australian selection at the 1953 Adelaide Carnival. In doing so Lynch became the first West Adelaide player to earn All-Australian selection. He also twice selected in the 'Sporting Life' Team of the Year.

Lynch retired from league football following the 1958 Grand Final loss to Port Adelaide. In his 11 seasons with the club he played 147 games and kicked 14 goals

Jack Lynch was an inaugural inductee into the West Adelaide Hall of Fame in 2005 and the following year he was inducted into the South Australian Football Hall of Fame.
