= John Whelan =

John Whelan may refer to:

- Seán Ó Faoláin (1900–1991), Irish short story writer, born as John Francis Whelan
- John Whelan (Irish politician) (born 1961), Irish Labour Party politician
- John W. Whelan (1845–1906), American lawyer, farmer, and politician
- John "Rocky" Whelan (died 1855), English bushranger and serial killer in Van Diemen's Land, now Tasmania, Australia

== See also ==
- Jack Whelan (disambiguation)
