= Kevin Clarke (footballer, born 1931) =

Australian rules footballer

Personal information
- Full name: Kevin William Clarke
- Born: 25 June 1931
- Died: 31 October 2009 (aged 78); Proserpine, Qld
- Original team: West Perth
- Position: Ruck

Playing career^{1}
Years	Club	Games (Goals)
1950–54	West Perth	56 (64)
1955	Melbourne	1 (0)
1956–59	Carlton	57 (11)
1960–61	Sorrento, Victoria	36 (0)
Total		150 (75)
- ^{1} Playing statistics correct to the end of 1959.

Kevin William Clarke (25 June 1931 – 31 October 2009) was an Australian rules footballer who played for West Perth in the West Australian Football League (WAFL) and Melbourne and Carlton in the Victorian Football League (VFL).
