= Jack Whelan =

Australian rules footballer

Personal information
- Nickname: Silver
- Born: 1923–24
- Original team: St Kevin's College
- Height: 185 cm (6 ft 1 in)
- Weight: 89 kg (196 lb)

Playing career^{1}
Years	Club	Games (Goals)
1947–1951	Brunswick	
- ^{1} Playing statistics correct to the end of 1951.

Career highlights
- 2× Sporting Life Team of the Year: 1950, 1951; VFA representative team captain: 1950–51

Jack Whelan is a former Australian rules footballer who played with Brunswick in the Victorian Football Association (VFA).

A ruckman and follower originally from St Kevin's College, Whelan joined Brunswick and played his first senior football there in 1947. As a player, he was unremarkable in his early years, and his preference to play without glasses meant that his near-sightedness limited his vision to about thirty yards. Whelan also involved himself in the club's administration, and was the first active player to be elected vice-president of the club, holding the role by 1950.

During 1949, Whelan took the novel step of wearing contact lenses during games; contact lenses were still a relatively new and expensive invention, and Whelan's lenses cost him forty guineas. His form improved significantly and quickly, and by the 1950 season at age 26 he was one of the VFA's star followers. His rapid rise led to his selection as captain of the VFA team at the 1950 Interstate Carnival, despite not even holding the position of vice-captain of his club. He was named as second follower in the Sporting Life Team of the Year, the only VFA player selected in the team.

In 1951, Whelan received offers of coaching roles at different clubs, but ultimately remained at Brunswick and accepted the captaincy. However, after a dispute between Whelan and the club over how much he would be paid for the role, Whelan withdrew from the club's Round 1 match, and was then suspended by the club. It was a month before Brunswick reinstated him to the team, and he lost the captaincy in the process. Nevertheless, he remained one of the stars of the association, once again captaining the VFA in interstate football in 1951 and being the only VFA player named in the Sporting Life Team of the Year.

In 1952, Whelan took an offer as captain-coach of the Euroa Football Club in the Waranga North-Eastern Football League, spending two seasons at the country club. He trained with and sought a clearance to Victorian Football League club Melbourne in the 1954 pre-season, but retired before the season after breaking down with a knee injury.
