= Keith Harper (footballer) =

Australian rules footballer

Personal information
- Full name: Keith Harper
- Born: 12 July 1927; Darwin, Australia
- Died: 12 August 1997 (aged 70); Mandurah
- Position: Wing/Centre

Playing career^{1}
Years	Club	Games (Goals)
1948–1960	Perth	229 (9)
- ^{1} Playing statistics correct to the end of 1960.

Keith Harper (12 July 1927 – 12 August 1997) was an Australian rules footballer who played for Perth in the West Australian National Football League (WANFL) during the late 1940s and 1950s. His younger brother Roy also played with the club.

== WANFL ==
Harper had an accomplished career at Perth, which began in the 1948 season. Used mostly as a centreman or winger, Harper won the first of his four 'Fairest and Best' awards in 1951 before winning it again in 1953, 1957 and 1959. He was appointed club captain in 1955 and led Perth to the premiership that year, their first since 1907. From 1956 to 1960 he remained captain of Perth but they didn't experience anymore premiership success.

== Interstate football ==
The midfielder took the field regularly for Western Australia in interstate matches and made a total of 18 appearances. His best performances came in 1954 when he won a Simpson Medal for his effort against Victoria at Subiaco and in 1956 where he was awarded All-Australian selection at the Perth Carnival.

== Legacy ==
In 1999 he was named as a wingman in Perth's official 'Team of the Century'. Later, in 2004, Harper was inducted into the West Australian Football Hall of Fame as one of the inaugural inductees.
