= Ray Whitaker =

Australian rules footballer

Personal information
- Full name: Raymond Whitaker Jnr
- Position: Rover

Playing career
Years	Club	Games (Goals)
1949–1955	Port Adelaide	79 (104)

Representative team honours
Years	Team	Games (Goals)
1950–1953	South Australia	14

Career highlights
- Port Adelaide premiership player (1951); Port Adelaide best and fairest (1952); Port Adelaide leading goal kicker (1953)

Ray Whitaker was an Australian rules footballer for the Port Adelaide Football Club.
