= Keith Kuhlmann =

Australian rules footballer

Personal information
- Full name: Keith Kuhlmann
- Born: 15 December 1955 (age 70)
- Height: 193 cm (6 ft 4 in)
- Weight: 96 kg (212 lb)
- Position: Key position defender

Playing career^{1}
Years	Club	Games (Goals)
1973–78	West Adelaide	128 (13)
1979–82	Glenelg	102 (0)
Total		230 (13)
- ^{1} Playing statistics correct to the end of 1982.

Keith Kuhlmann (born 15 December 1955) is a former Australian rules footballer who played for West Adelaide and Glenelg in the South Australian National Football League (SANFL).

A key position defender, Kuhlmann started his career in 1973 at West Adelaide and was a regular member of their team during the 1970s. Such was his consistency that he was never dropped to the West Adelaide reserves. He crossed to Glenelg in 1979 and played well enough to be selected to the South Australian interstate team four times. His interstate performances in 1980, at fullback, saw him named in the All-Australian team.

In 2023 Kuhlmann was inducted into the Glenelg Football Club Hall of Fame.
