= Lance Cox =

Australian rules footballer

Personal information
- Full name: Lance Cox
- Born: 11 October 1933
- Died: 31 January 2016 (aged 82)
- Original team: New Town
- Height: 169 cm (5 ft 7 in)
- Weight: 74 kg (163 lb)

Playing career^{1}
Years	Club	Games (Goals)
1954–55	Richmond	7 (0)
- ^{1} Playing statistics correct to the end of 1955.

Lance Cox (11 October 1933 – 31 January 2016) was an Australian rules footballer who played with Richmond in the Victorian Football League (VFL).
