= Marcel Hilsz =

Australian rules footballer (1921–1997)

Personal information
- Full name: Marcel Louis Hilsz
- Born: 9 February 1921; Adelaide, South Australia
- Died: 15 May 1997 (aged 76); Forrestfield, Western Australia
- Height: 5 ft 10 in (178 cm)
- Weight: 13 st 1 lb (83 kg)

Playing career^{1}
Years	Club	Games (Goals)
1938–41, 1946–52	Perth	187 (84) (Note: The games tally is a minimum as Perth did not keep records for the 1946 season.)
1942	St Kilda	8 (0)
- ^{1} Playing statistics correct to the end of 1952.

Marcel Louis 'Nugget' Hilsz (9 February 1921 – 15 May 1997) was an Australian rules footballer who played for St Kilda in the VFL and Perth in the WAFL.

Hilsz began at Perth in 1938 but saw his early career interrupted by the Second World War. While on war service in Victoria he spent some time with St Kilda and played eight VFL games in 1942. He played most of his football as a hard running defender but could also play forward, topping Perth's goal kicking list with 65 goals in 1951. His best football was played after the war and he represented Western Australia in eight interstate games.

He is a member of Perth's official 'Team of the Century' in the back pocket.
