= Noel Clarke (footballer) =

Australian rules footballer (1930–2022)

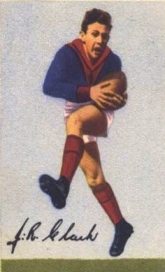

Personal information
- Full name: Noel Arthur Clarke
- Born: 26 December 1930
- Died: 7 August 2022 (aged 91); Glenorchy, Tasmania, Australia
- Original team: North Launceston
- Height: 180 cm (5 ft 11 in)
- Weight: 81 kg (179 lb)
- Position: Forward

Playing career^{1}
Years	Club	Games (Goals)
1951–1955	Melbourne	77 (155)
- ^{1} Playing statistics correct to the end of 1955.

Career highlights
- 1955 VFL premiership player

Noel Arthur Clarke (26 December 1930 – 7 August 2022) was an Australian rules footballer who played in the Victorian Football League (VFL) and in Tasmania.

== Career begins in Tasmania ==
Clarke signed with North Launceston at the start of the 1949 season, won the club's best first-year player award, and was among the better players on Grand Final day when North won the NTFA premiership. He was a star player the next season too when North Launceston won the State Premiership as well as another NTFA title.

== Moves to Melbourne ==
Noel Clarke joined Melbourne in 1951 and played most games at full forward. He played a major role in the 1955 Melbourne premiership side by kicking three goals in the Grand Final.

== Return to Tasmania ==
In early 1956 Clarke was cleared by Melbourne to play with North Hobart in the TFL competition.
