= North Hobart Football Club =

North Hobart

Names
- Full name: North Hobart Football Club
- Nickname: Demons
- Club song: "It's A Grand Old Flag!"

2025 SFL Premier League season
- After finals: 3rd
- Home-and-away season: 3rd
- Leading goalkicker: Callum Kilpatrick (32)

Club details
- Founded: 1881; 145 years ago
- Colours: Blue Red
- Competition: SFL Premier League
- President: Dave Kilpatrick
- Coach: Adam Bester
- Captain: Bailey Walker
- Ground: North Hobart Oval (capacity: 18,000)

Uniforms
Home

Other information
- Official website: nhfc.net.au

The North Hobart Football Club, nicknamed The Demons, is an Australian rules football club currently competing in the Southern Football League Premier Division. The club was a part of the Tasmanian Football League from the early 1900s until 2001, when it joined the Southern Football League. In 2009, North Hobart was invited into the second reincarnation of the statewide league, where it remained until 2013. After the 2013 season, its position in the league was effectively filled by the Hobart City Football Club. North Hobart returned to the Tasmanian State League in 2018. However, following the cessation of the TSL in 2024, the club rejoined the Southern Football League in 2025

In 2014, the North Hobart Football Club Inc. changed from an incorporated body to a company limited with 100% ownership of the Hobart City Football Club, with the Hobart City Demons now the trading name of North Hobart Football Club Ltd.

On October 9, 2017 the paying members of the Hobart City Demons voted 371-118 in favour of returning the playing name of the club to the North Hobart identity for season 2018 and beyond.

Players to reach Australian Football League level include Paul Williams, Peter 'Percy' Jones, Daryn Cresswell, Chris Bond, James Manson, Jim Wright, Tony Pickett, Colin Garland and several other big names. In total 54 North Hobart players have moved on to play at VFL/AFL level.

In 2005, North Hobart was the first club inducted into the AFL Tasmania Hall of Fame as a Great Club.

== Honours and achievements ==
=== Club achievements ===
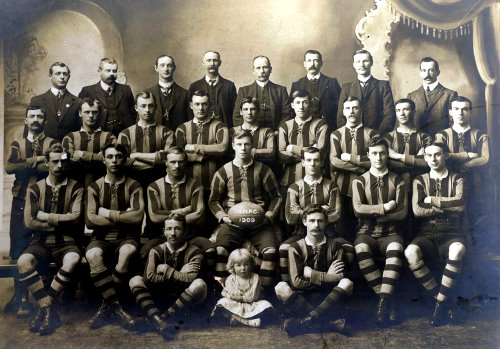
A NHFC team of 1909

- Tasmanian Football League
  - Premierships (27): 1902, 1905, 1908, 1914, 1920, 1923, 1928, 1929, 1932, 1934, 1936, 1938, 1939, 1940, 1941, 1945, 1947, 1957, 1961, 1962, 1967, 1969, 1974, 1987, 1989, 1991, 1992
  - Runners-Up (17): 1896, 1897, 1912, 1921, 1922, 1925, 1930, 1931, 1933, 1935, 1937, 1948, 1951, 1956, 1960, 1965, 1968
- Southern Football League (Tasmania)
  - Premierships (1): 2003
  - Runners-Up (2): 2002, 2008
  - Women’s Premierships (3): 2022, 2023, 2024

Tasmanian State Premierships (12): 1914, 1920, 1923, 1929, 1936, 1939, 1940, 1941, 1945, 1961, 1962, 1969

=== Individual awards ===
William Leitch Medallists

- 1932 – Len Pye
- 1934 – S. Sproule
- 1945 – E. Reid
- 1977 – Mick Hawkins
- 1993 – Darren Perry
- 1994 – Michael Maple
- 2003 – Brendon Bolton

George Watt Medallists

- 1954 – M. Cleary
- 1955 – A. Petersen
- 1957 – A. Gould (tied)
- 1958 – R. Large
- 1959 – S. Graham
- 1960 – K. Turner
- 1962 – Bruce Felmingham
- 1966 – W. Patmore
- 1968 – A. Patmore (tied)
- 1984 – Victor Di Venuto
- 1985 – Tony Kline
- 1993 – Ricky Darley
- 1995 – Jeremy Busch
- 2002 – Richard Robinson
- 2007 – Michael Hall

V. A. Geard Medallists

- 1968 – A. Caudwell (tied)
- 1972 – Leigh McConnan (tied)

D. R. Plaister Medallists

- 1979 – Gary Webster

TFL Leading Goalkicker Award

- 1903 – A. Walton – 18
- 1905 – T. Mills – 15
- 1906 – T. Mills – 13
- 1907 – W. Lee – 14
- 1908 – FiG. Cook – 24
- 1914 – S. Russell – 26
- 1920 – W. Jack – 25
- 1923 – L. Stevens – 26
- 1929 – Alan Rait – 92
- 1930 – Alan Rait – 112
- 1931 – Alan Rait – 85
- 1932 – Alan Rait – 102
- 1935 – Alan Rait – 84
- 1936 – Alan Rait – 98
- 1937 – Alan Rait – 62
- 1938 – T. Richardson – 75
- 1939 – Jack Metherell – 61
- 1940 – Jack Metherell – 69
- 1941 – Jack Metherell – 64
- 1945 – Ted Collis – 54
- 1956 – Noel Clarke – 80
- 1958 – Paddy Cooper – 45
- 1961 – Noel Clarke – 74
- 1962 – David Collins – 77
- 1967 – David Collins – 58
- 1982 – Brett Stephens – 92
- 1987 - Steve McQueen – 80 (Joint winner)
- 1992 – Byron Howard – 92
- 1995 – Byron Howard – 104
- 1997 – Byron Howard – 70

Southern Football League Leading Goalkicker

- 2001 – Robert Devine – 102
- 2002 – Robert Devine – 60
- 2008 – Robert Devine – 82

=== Individual records ===
Most Senior games

- 268 – Don McLeod (1972–1986)
- 264 - Robert Devine (1997 - 2010)

Most overall games

- 341 - Robert Devine (264 senior games)

Most Goals:

- 689 - Alan Rait
- 651 - Robert Devine

=== Club records ===
Club Record Attendance

- 19,425 – North Hobart 19.15 (129) v Clarence 17.15 (117) – 1969 TFL Grand Final at North Hobart Oval

Club Record Score

- TFL 37.24 (246) vs. South Launceston 2.5 (17) in 1991 at North Hobart Oval

== Senior Coaches ==
- 1911 – George Morrissey
- 1912-1913 – Edward Russell
- 1914-1915 – Charlie Dunn
- 1919 – Edward Russell
- 1920 – Charlie Dunn
- 1921 – Joe Rutter
- 1922 – Jack Dunn
- 1923 – Percy Martyn
- 1924 – Les Stevens & Jack Gardiner
- 1925 – Jack Gardiner
- 1926 – Fred Williams & Jack Gardiner
- 1927 – Fred Mutch
- 1928-1929 – Jack Dunn
- 1930 – Alby Bonnitcha & Jack Dunn
- 1931 – Bruce McGregor
- 1932-1933 – Roy Cazaly
- 1934 – Len Pitchford
- 1935 – Alan Rait
- 1936-1937 – Cecil Pettiona
- 1938-1941 & 1945 – Jack Metherell
- 1946 – Arthur O'Brien & Dinny Kelleher
- 1947-1948 – Jack Metherell
- 1949 – Roy Quinn
- 1950 – Vern Rae
- 1951-1953 – Les McCankie
- 1954-1959 – John Leedham
- 1960-1964 – Darrell Eaton
- 1964 – Max Kelleher & Byron Howard Snr
- 1965-1966 – Dick Grimmond
- 1967-1971 – John Devine
- 1972-1973 – Vin Crowe
- 1974-1975 – John Devine
- 1976 – Ross Price
- 1977-1978 – Ian Bremner
- 1979-1980 – John Chick
- 1981 – John Devine
- 1982-1983 – John Thurley
- 1984-1986 – Darryl Sutton
- 1987-1989 – Garry Davidson
- 1990 – Roland Crosby
- 1991-1992 – Mark Yeates
- 1993-1994 – Andy Bennett
- 1995-1996 – Ricky Hanlon
- 1997-1998 – John McCarthy
- 1999 – Darryn Perry
- 2000 – Darren Trevena
- 2001-2002 – Steven Bozicevic
- 2003-2005 – Brendon Bolton
- 2006-2007 – Brent Williams
- 2008-2009 – Matthew Geappen
- 2010-2011 – Clinton Brown
- 2011-2013 – Lance Spaulding
- 2014-2015 - Michael McGregor
- 2016-2017 - Kane Richter
- 2018-2020 - Richard Robinson
- 2021- 2022 - Clinton French
- 2022–present - Adam Bester

== Famous Matches ==
=== 1967 Grand Finals ===
In 1967 TANFL Season North Hobart went on to win the premiership after winning just once in their first eight games of the season. The team won nine of their last 11 games to finish fourth on the ladder, before going on to beat New Norfolk by 5 points in the Semi-Final, followed by a 9 point victory over an inaccurate Clarence team in the preliminary final. The team then went on the beat Glenorchy by 14 points in front of 17,523 in the TANFL Grand Final.

1967 TANFL Grand Final

Glenorchy 2.5 2.12 3.13 8.16 (64)

North Hobart 3.3 6.5 9.8 11.12 (78)

Result: North Hobart won by 14 points

After winning the TANFL Premiership, the club qualified to compete against NWFU Premiers Wynyard in the 1967 Tasmanian State Premiership Final at West Park Oval in Burnie. The match turned out to be one of the most controversial is Tasmanian football history.

1967 Tasmanian State Premiership Final

Wynard 1.1 9.7 10.9 13.14 (92)

North Hobart 3.8 5.11 11.17 12.19 (91)

Result: No Result

One of the most controversial games in Australian rules football history, the match was declared no result and the premiership was withheld after fans invaded the field and eventually took down the goal posts, preventing North Hobart full-forward David Collins from taking a kick after the siren which would likely have won or tied the game for North Hobart.

=== 1987 TFL Grand Final ===
Nth Hobart: 2.4 (16) | 13.7 (85) | 20.16 (136) | 23.20 (158)

Glenorchy: 5.4 (34) | 10.6 (66) | 12.8 (80) | 16.10 (106)

Attendance: 17,094 at North Hobart Oval

The 1987 Grand Final saw North Hobart hoping to end a premiership drought extending back to 1974, Glenorchy aiming for a hat-trick of TFL premierships. The match was eerily similar to the Second Semi Final clash between the same sides two weeks earlier with Glenorchy getting out a fast start and North Hobart reeling them in and racing away with match. North Hobart booted a Grand Final record 11.3 (69) in the second quarter to go into half-time 19-points to the good of the Magpies, then inflicting further damage in the third quarter by racing out a 56-point lead at the final change. This was the beginning of a dominant era for North Hobart who went on to win four premierships in the space of six seasons.

=== 1991 TFL Grand Final ===
- North Hobart: 2.5 (17) | 5.7 (37) | 7.9 (51) | 12.14 (86)
- Nth Launceston: 2.2 (14) | 7.7 (49) | 7.11 (53) | 8.12 (60)
- Attendance: 13,112 at North Hobart Oval
