= 1981 TANFL season =

Australian rules football season

- Teams: Clarence Kangaroos; Glenorchy Magpies; Hobart Tigers; New Norfolk Eagles; North Hobart Demons; Sandy Bay Seagulls
- Premiers: Clarence
- Minor premiers: Clarence; 4th minor premiership

Attendance
- Matches played: 64
- Total attendance: 156,581 (2,447 per match)

The 1981 Tasmanian Australian National Football League (TANFL) premiership season was an Australian rules football competition staged in Hobart, Tasmania over twenty (20) roster rounds and four finals series matches between 4 April and 19 September 1981.

The League was known as the Winfield League under a A$30,000 commercial naming-rights sponsorship agreement with the Winfield tobacco company.

== Participating Clubs ==
- Clarence District Football Club
- Glenorchy District Football Club
- Hobart Football Club
- New Norfolk District Football Club
- North Hobart Football Club
- Sandy Bay Football Club

=== 1981 TANFL Club Coaches ===
- Noel Leary (Clarence)
- Peter Hudson (Glenorchy)
- Paul Sproule (Hobart)
- John Bingley (New Norfolk)
- John Devine (North Hobart)
- Graeme Mackey (Sandy Bay)

=== Midas Mufflers League (Reserves) Grand Final ===
- New Norfolk 22.11 (143) v Glenorchy 15.12 (102) – North Hobart Oval

=== CBA League (Under-19's) Grand Final ===
- Clarence 14.19 (103) v Glenorchy 14.13 (97) – North Hobart Oval

=== TANFL Fourths (Under-17's) Grand Final ===
- Glenorchy 13.7 (85) v Clarence 11.10 (76) – New Town Oval

=== Interstate Matches ===
Escort Cup Match (Sunday, 12 April 1981)

- Tasmania 13.18 (96) v Queensland 12.8 (80) – Att: N/A at Chelmer Oval, Brisbane

Escort Cup Match (Sunday, 26 April 1981)

- ACT 17.4 (106) v Tasmania 11.20 (86) – Att: 8,497 at North Hobart Oval

Interstate Match (Saturday, 4 July 1981)

- Victoria 31.20 (206) v Tasmania 16.12 (108) – Att: 6,349 at North Hobart Oval

=== Leading Goalkickers: TANFL ===
- Andrew Vanderfeen (Clarence) – 66
- David Garlick (Clarence) – 60
- Paul Courto (Hobart) – 56
- Dan Foster (New Norfolk) – 53

=== Medal Winners ===
- Robbie Dykes (New Norfolk) – William Leitch Medal
- Wayne Olding (Glenorchy) – George Watt Medal (Reserves)
- Neil Jeffrey (Glenorchy) – V.A Geard Medal (Under-19's)
- Mark Hall (New Norfolk) – D.R Plaister Medal (Under-17's)
- Rod Hughes (Clarence) & Chris Saunders (Sandy Bay) – Lefroy Medal (Best player/s in Interstate Matches)

== 1981 TANFL Ladder ==
Pos	Team	Pld	W	L	D	PF	PA	PP	Pts
1	Clarence	20	16	4	0	2309	1677	137.7	64
2	New Norfolk	20	14	6	0	2175	1708	127.3	56
3	Glenorchy	20	13	7	0	2096	1864	112.4	52
4	Hobart	20	9	11	0	1656	1767	93.7	36
5	Sandy Bay	20	7	13	0	1713	1824	93.9	28
6	North Hobart	20	1	19	0	1512	2542	59.5	4

=== Round 1 ===
(Saturday, 4 April 1981)

- Clarence 19.17 (131) v Hobart 13.15 (93) – Att: 2,340 at North Hobart Oval
- New Norfolk 20.22 (142) v Sandy Bay 9.14 (68) – Att: 1,576 at Queenborough Oval
- Glenorchy 22.15 (147) v Nth Hobart 19.20 (134) – Att: 2,033 at KGV Football Park

=== Round 2 ===
(Saturday, 11 April 1981)

- Clarence 13.20 (98) v Nth Hobart 10.17 (77) Att: 2,800 at North Hobart Oval
- Hobart 13.18 (96) v Sandy Bay 13.11 (89) - Att: 981 at TCA Ground
- Glenorchy 15.14 (104) v New Norfolk 13.16 (94) - Att: 1,846 at Boyer Oval

=== Round 3 ===
(Saturday, 18 April & Sunday, 19 April 1981)

- New Norfolk 14.15 (99) v Hobart 12.19 (91) – Att: 2,409 at North Hobart Oval
- Sandy Bay 17.14 (116) v Nth Hobart 10.15 (75) – Att: 1,302 at Queenborough Oval
- Clarence 20.23 (143) v Glenorchy 12.12 (84) – Att: 4,193 at North Hobart Oval (Sunday)

=== Round 4 ===
(Saturday, 2 May 1981)

- Clarence 11.14 (80) v Sandy Bay 10.9 (69) – Att: 2,621 at North Hobart Oval
- Glenorchy 12.17 (89) v Hobart 10.13 (73) – Att: 1,640 at TCA Ground
- New Norfolk 19.20 (134) v Nth Hobart 9.12 (66) – Att: 1,611 at Boyer Oval

=== Round 5 ===
(Saturday, 9 May 1981)

- Nth Hobart 15.20 (110) v Glenorchy 15.11 (101) – Att: 2,100 at North Hobart Oval
- Hobart 16.16 (112) v Clarence 11.12 (78) – Att: 2,279 at Bellerive Oval
- New Norfolk 17.22 (124) v Sandy Bay 10.6 (66) – Att: 1,295 at Boyer Oval

=== Round 6 ===
(Saturday, 16 May 1981)

- Sandy Bay 10.10 (70) v Hobart 8.11 (59) – Att: 1,618 at North Hobart Oval
- New Norfolk 14.17 (101) v Glenorchy 9.16 (70) – Att: 2,643 at KGV Football Park
- Clarence 14.18 (102) v Nth Hobart 5.15 (45) – Att: 2,152 at Bellerive Oval

=== Round 7 ===
(Saturday, 23 May 1981)

- Sandy Bay 24.12 (156) v Nth Hobart 16.13 (109) – Att: 1,707 at North Hobart Oval
- New Norfolk 22.18 (150) v Hobart 16.13 (109) – Att: 1,350 at TCA Ground
- Clarence 21.13 (139) v Glenorchy 13.15 (93) – Att: 2,063 at KGV Football Park

=== Round 8 ===
(Saturday, 30 May 1981)

- Glenorchy 19.14 (128) v Sandy Bay 10.10 (70) – Att: 2,058 at North Hobart Oval
- Hobart 18.16 (124) v Nth Hobart 9.17 (71) – Att: 1,152 at TCA Ground
- New Norfolk 21.11 (137) v Clarence 12.13 (85) – Att: 2,944 at Boyer Oval

=== Round 9 ===
(Saturday, 6 June 1981)

- New Norfolk 15.18 (108) v Nth Hobart 10.7 (67) – Att: 2,676 at North Hobart Oval (Double header)
- Sandy Bay 16.12 (108) v Clarence 13.6 (84) – Att: 2,676 at North Hobart Oval (Double header) *
- Hobart 8.14 (62) v Glenorchy 7.9 (51) – Att: 1,454 at KGV Football Park

Note: This match was moved to North Hobart after Queenborough was closed by the Hobart City Council 24-hours prior.

=== Round 10 ===
(Monday, 8 June 1981)

- Hobart 11.13 (79) v Nth Hobart 9.16 (70) – Att: 1,909 at North Hobart Oval
- Glenorchy 11.14 (80) v Sandy Bay 9.17 (71) – Att: 1,670 at KGV Football Park
- Clarence 14.19 (103) v New Norfolk 6.7 (43) – Att: 2,638 at Bellerive Oval

=== Round 11 ===
(Saturday, 13 June 1981)

- New Norfolk 8.19 (67) v Sandy Bay 9.4 (58) – Att: 1,522 at North Hobart Oval
- Clarence 7.14 (56) v Hobart 4.5 (29) – Att: 1,469 at TCA Ground
- Glenorchy 18.21 (129) v Nth Hobart 9.8 (62) – Att: 1,194 at KGV Football Park

=== Round 12 ===
(Saturday, 20 June 1981)

- Clarence 20.17 (137) v Nth Hobart 12.8 (80) – Att: 2,273 at North Hobart Oval
- Sandy Bay 13.14 (92) v Hobart 8.14 (62) – Att: 1,333 at Queenborough Oval
- Glenorchy 16.12 (108) v New Norfolk 12.18 (90) – Att: 2,150 at Boyer Oval

=== Round 13 ===
(Saturday, 27 June 1981)

- Sandy Bay 20.21 (141) v Nth Hobart 5.7 (37) – Att: 1,179 at Queenborough Oval
- Clarence 22.15 (147) v Glenorchy 15.18 (108) – Att: 2,815 at Bellerive Oval
- New Norfolk 17.16 (118) v Hobart 9.13 (67) – Att: 1,314 at Boyer Oval

=== Round 14 ===
(Saturday, 11 July 1981)

- Hobart 13.7 (85) v Nth Hobart 8.11 (59) – Att: 1,130 at North Hobart Oval
- Glenorchy 14.12 (96) v Sandy Bay 10.11 (71) – Att: 1,780 at KGV Football Park
- Clarence 15.8 (98) v New Norfolk 6.13 (49) – Att: 2,561 at Bellerive Oval

=== Round 15 ===
(Saturday, 18 July 1981)

- Glenorchy 17.14 (116) v Hobart 8.10 (58) – Att: 2,001 at North Hobart Oval
- Clarence 10.9 (69) v Sandy Bay 1.9 (15) – Att: 1,668 at Queenborough Oval
- New Norfolk 23.25 (163) v Nth Hobart 9.9 (63) – Att: 1,129 at Boyer Oval

=== Round 16 ===
(Saturday, 25 July 1981)

- Glenorchy 20.22 (142) v Nth Hobart 7.20 (62) – Att: 1,579 at North Hobart Oval
- New Norfolk 13.15 (93) v Sandy Bay 10.12 (72) – Att: 1,089 at Queenborough Oval
- Clarence 16.12 (108) v Hobart 12.10 (82) – Att: 1,951 at Bellerive Oval

=== Round 17 ===
(Saturday, 1 August 1981)

- Glenorchy 21.14 (140) v New Norfolk 17.10 (112) – Att: 2,776 at North Hobart Oval
- Hobart 15.14 (104) v Sandy Bay 10.12 (72) – Att: 1,293 at Queenborough Oval
- Clarence 24.20 (164) v Nth Hobart 8.16 (64) – Att: 1,473 at Bellerive Oval

=== Round 18 ===
(Saturday, 8 August 1981)

- Sandy Bay 18.12 (120) v Nth Hobart 13.14 (92) – Att: 1,005 at North Hobart Oval
- Hobart 12.14 (86) v New Norfolk 11.18 (84) – Att: 1,297 at TCA Ground
- Clarence 20.20 (140) v Glenorchy 15.10 (100) – Att: 3,373 at KGV Football Park

=== Round 19 ===
(Saturday, 15 August 1981)

- New Norfolk 15.21 (111) v Clarence 13.11 (89) – Att: 3,396 at North Hobart Oval
- Hobart 21.14 (140) v Nth Hobart 10.11 (71) – Att: 786 at TCA Ground
- Glenorchy 16.10 (106) v Sandy Bay 12.19 (91) – Att: 1,558 at Queenborough Oval*

Note: Peter Hudson (Glenorchy) returns to football for the first time since his 1979 retirement and kicks 10 goals.

=== Round 20 ===
(Saturday, 22 August 1981)

- New Norfolk 22.24 (156) v Nth Hobart 15.8 (98) – Att: 1,167 at North Hobart Oval
- Glenorchy 12.21 (93) v Hobart 6.9 (45) – Att: 2,363 at KGV Football Park
- Clarence 16.25 (121) v Sandy Bay 14.14 (98) – Att: 1,584 at Bellerive Oval

=== First Semi Final ===
(Saturday, 29 August 1981)

- Glenorchy: 6.4 (40) | 10.5 (65) | 15.8 (98) | 23.11 (149)
- Hobart: 6.3 (39) | 9.11 (65) | 11.12 (78) | 15.13 (103)
- Attendance: 6,077 at North Hobart Oval

=== Second Semi Final ===
(Saturday, 5 September 1981)

- Clarence: 5.5 (35) | 11.10 (76) | 14.12 (96) | 23.15 (153)
- New Norfolk: 2.2 (14) | 4.6 (30) | 10.10 (70) | 10.14 (74)
- Attendance: 8,310 at North Hobart Oval

=== Preliminary Final ===
(Saturday, 12 September 1981)

- New Norfolk: 0.2 (2) | 4.8 (32) | 11.12 (78) | 15.19 (109)
- Glenorchy: 4.4 (28) | 5.7 (37) | 8.10 (58) | 10.10 (70)
- Attendance: 8,057 at North Hobart Oval

=== Grand Final ===
(Saturday, 19 September 1981)

- Clarence: 4.8 (32) | 5.14 (44) | 10.19 (79) | 15.23 (113)
- New Norfolk: 4.3 (27) | 8.5 (53) | 10.7 (67) | 13.10 (88)
- Attendance: 20,193 at North Hobart Oval

Source: All scores and statistics courtesy of the Hobart Mercury and Saturday Evening Mercury (SEM) publications.
