= 1980 TANFL season =

Australian rules football season

- Teams: Clarence Kangaroos; Glenorchy Magpies; Hobart Tigers; New Norfolk Eagles; North Hobart Demons; Sandy Bay Seagulls
- Premiers: Hobart
- Minor premiers: Glenorchy

Attendance
- Matches played: 49
- Total attendance: 112,626 (2,298 per match)

The 1980 Tasmanian Australian National Football League (TANFL) premiership season was an Australian rules football competition staged in Hobart, Tasmania over fifteen roster rounds and four finals series matches between 24 May and 20 September 1980.

The season started almost two months later than usual and was shortened by several rounds to accommodate the inaugural Winfield Statewide Cup which was held that season.

The League was known as the Winfield League under a commercial naming-rights sponsorship agreement with the Winfield tobacco company.

== Participating clubs ==
- Clarence District Football Club
- Glenorchy District Football Club
- Hobart Football Club
- New Norfolk District Football Club
- North Hobart Football Club
- Sandy Bay Football Club

=== 1980 TANFL Club Coaches ===
- Noel Leary (Clarence)
- Colin Tully (Glenorchy)
- Paul Sproule (Hobart)
- Hedley Thompson (New Norfolk)
- John Chick (North Hobart)
- Graeme Mackey (Sandy Bay)

=== Midas Mufflers League (Reserves) Grand Final ===
- Clarence 22.15 (147) v Glenorchy 11.17 (83) – North Hobart Oval

=== Dux Hotwater Systems League (Under-19's) Grand Final ===
- Sandy Bay 10.10 (70) v Glenorchy 7.11 (53) – North Hobart Oval

=== TANFL Fourths (Under-17's) Grand Final ===
- Clarence 16.12 (108) v Hobart 7.4 (46) – New Town Oval

=== Winfield Statewide Cup ===
(Saturday, 17 May 1980)

- Hobart: 1.5 (11) | 4.9 (33) | 8.13 (61) | 9.21 (75)
- Clarence: 2.2 (14) | 3.2 (20) | 6.3 (39) | 7.4 (46)
- Attendance: 5,961 at North Hobart Oval

=== Leading Goalkickers: TANFL ===
- Paul Courto (Hobart) – 86
- Andrew Vanderfeen (Clarence) – 55
- Wayne Fox (Glenorchy) – 50
- Dan Foster (New Norfolk) – 45

=== Medal Winners ===
- Gary Linton (Glenorchy) – William Leitch Medal
- Henry Pastoor (Sandy Bay) – George Watt Medal (Reserves)
- A.Davies (Sandy Bay) – V.A Geard Medal (Under-19's)
- Leigh Brooks (New Norfolk) – D.R Plaister Medal (Under-17's)

=== Interstate Matches ===
Interstate Match (March 1980)

- Queensland 15.17 (107) v Tasmania 9.13 (67) – Att: 2,185 at Ulverstone Recreation Ground

Interstate Match (Saturday, 5 July 1980)

- Tasmania 21.17 (143) v South Australia 18.16 (124) – Att: 6,758 at North Hobart Oval

=== State Of Origin Australian Championships ===
Preliminary Final (Saturday, 11 October 1980)

- South Australia 22.18 (150) v Tasmania 8.13 (61) – Att: 10,666 at Football Park, Adelaide (Double-Header)

Consolation Final (Monday, 13 October 1980)

- Western Australia 17.23 (125) v Tasmania 12.18 (90) – Att: 17,579 at Football Park, Adelaide (Double-Header)

== 1980 TANFL Ladder ==
Pos	Team	Pld	W	L	D	PF	PA	PP	Pts
1	Glenorchy	15	11	3	1	1635	1223	133.7	46
2	Hobart	15	9	6	0	1552	1347	115.2	36
3	Clarence	15	9	6	0	1589	1472	107.9	36
4	New Norfolk	15	7	8	0	1584	1468	107.9	28
5	North Hobart	15	6	8	1	1353	1681	80.5	26
6	Sandy Bay	15	2	13	0	1345	1867	72.0	8

=== Round 1 ===
(Saturday, 24 May 1980)

- Glenorchy 15.8 (98) v New Norfolk 13.16 (94) – Att: 2,174 at North Hobart Oval
- North Hobart 16.13 (109) v Sandy Bay 13.16 (94) – Att: 1,166 at Queenborough Oval
- Hobart 16.9 (105) v Clarence 11.13 (79) – Att: 1,789 at Bellerive Oval

=== Round 2 ===
(Saturday, 31 May 1980)

- Clarence 26.16 (172) v North Hobart 16.16 (112) – Att: 2,028 at North Hobart Oval
- Sandy Bay 23.16 (154) v New Norfolk 21.14 (140) – Att: 885 at Queenborough Oval
- Glenorchy 17.15 (117) v Hobart 12.12 (84) – Att: 2,103 at KGV Football Park

=== Round 3 ===
(Saturday, 7 June 1980)

- Clarence 28.14 (182) v Sandy Bay 16.12 (108) – Att: 2,297 at North Hobart Oval
- New Norfolk 16.17 (113) v Hobart 15.13 (103) – Att: 1,257 at TCA Ground
- Glenorchy 14.12 (96) v North Hobart 13.18 (96) – Att: 1,920 at KGV Football Park

Note: This was the first draw in 336 TANFL games since Sandy Bay v Clarence in Round 19 of 1974.

=== Round 4 ===
(Saturday, 14 June & Monday, 16 June 1980)

- New Norfolk 16.14 (110) v Clarence 13.10 (88) – Att: 2,677 at North Hobart Oval
- Hobart 23.16 (154) v North Hobart 12.10 (82) – Att: 1,544 at TCA Ground
- Glenorchy 15.20 (110) v Sandy Bay 8.12 (60) – Att: 2,315 at North Hobart Oval (Monday)

=== Round 5 ===
(Saturday, 21 June 1980)

- Hobart 25.15 (165) v Sandy Bay 11.10 (76) – Att: 1,429 at North Hobart Oval
- Clarence 14.17 (101) v Glenorchy 7.21 (63) – Att: 2,911 at Bellerive Oval
- New Norfolk 15.22 (112) v North Hobart 10.17 (77) – Att: 1,304 at Boyer Oval

=== Round 6 ===
(Saturday, 28 June 1980)

- North Hobart 11.11 (77) v Sandy Bay 10.14 (74) – Att: 676 at North Hobart Oval
- Hobart 11.15 (81) v Clarence 6.16 (52) – Att: 1,215 at TCA Ground
- Glenorchy 12.13 (85) v New Norfolk 5.10 (40) – Att: 1,159 at KGV Football Park

=== Round 7 ===
(Sunday, 6 July 1980)

- North Hobart 19.12 (126) v Clarence 14.20 (104) – Att: 1,382 at North Hobart Oval
- Glenorchy 13.13 (91) v Hobart 10.15 (75) – Att: 1,741 at TCA Ground
- New Norfolk 15.10 (100) v Sandy Bay 10.11 (71) – Att: 1,103 at Boyer Oval

=== Round 8 ===
(Saturday, 12 July 1980)

- Hobart 22.7 (139) v New Norfolk 15.14 (104) – Att: 1,786 at North Hobart Oval
- Glenorchy 13.15 (93) v North Hobart 11.16 (82) – Att: 1,875 at KGV Football Park
- Clarence 20.18 (138) v Sandy Bay 13.12 (90) – Att: 1,479 at Bellerive Oval

=== Round 9 ===
(Saturday, 19 July 1980)

- Hobart 15.12 (102) v North Hobart 13.15 (93) – Att: 1,774 at North Hobart Oval
- Glenorchy 28.25 (193) v Sandy Bay 9.11 (65) – Att: 1,082 at Queenborough Oval
- New Norfolk 21.23 (149) v Clarence 12.8 (80) – Att: 1,427 at Boyer Oval

=== Round 10 ===
(Saturday, 26 July 1980)

- North Hobart 17.16 (118) v New Norfolk 15.24 (114) – Att: 1,825 at North Hobart Oval
- Hobart 17.8 (110) v Sandy Bay 13.10 (88) – Att: 886 at Queenborough Oval
- Clarence 17.17 (119) v Glenorchy 17.9 (111) – Att: 2,537 at KGV Football Park

=== Round 11 ===
(Saturday, 2 August 1980)

- Nth Hobart 15.12 (102) v Sandy Bay 9.20 (74) – Att: 1,420 at North Hobart Oval
- Clarence 16.17 (113) v Hobart 11.8 (74) – Att: 2,234 at Bellerive Oval
- Glenorchy 23.17 (155) v New Norfolk 7.17 (59) – Att: 1,638 at Boyer Oval

=== Round 12 ===
(Saturday, 9 August 1980)

- Glenorchy 11.18 (84) v Hobart 11.12 (78) – Att: 2,281 at North Hobart Oval
- New Norfolk 21.17 (143) v Sandy Bay 10.15 (75) – Att: 824 at Queenborough Oval
- Nth Hobart 13.17 (95) v Clarence 13.14 (92) – Att: 2,156 at Bellerive Oval

=== Round 13 ===
(Saturday, 16 August 1980)

- Nth Hobart 22.21 (153) v Glenorchy 9.16 (70) – Att: 2,901 at North Hobart Oval
- Clarence 15.12 (102) v Sandy Bay 14.11 (95) – Att: 1,131 at Queenborough Oval
- Hobart 13.13 (91) v New Norfolk 12.14 (86) – Att: 1,203 at Boyer Oval

=== Round 14 ===
(Saturday, 23 August 1980)

- Hobart 15.16 (106) v Nth Hobart 8.17 (65) – Att: 1,791 at North Hobart Oval
- Sandy Bay 16.16 (112) v Glenorchy 15.20 (110) – Att: 1,215 at KGV Football Park *
- Clarence 12.11 (83) v New Norfolk 10.12 (72) – Att: 1,789 at Bellerive Oval

Note: Glenorchy awarded the match due to Sandy Bay playing an unregistered player (Glen Joyce).

=== Round 15 ===
(Saturday, 30 August 1980)

- Clarence 12.16 (88) v Glenorchy 11.15 (81) – Att: 3,043 at North Hobart Oval
- Sandy Bay 15.19 (109) v Hobart 12.11 (83) – Att: 1,034 at TCA Ground
- New Norfolk 20.21 (141) v Nth Hobart 6.13 (49) – Att: 1,530 at Boyer Oval

=== First Semi Final ===
(Saturday, 6 September 1980)

- New Norfolk: 5.5 (35) | 6.9 (45) | 13.10 (88) | 14.11 (95)
- Clarence: 4.2 (26) | 7.7 (49) | 10.10 (70) | 12.14 (86)
- Attendance: 6,241 at North Hobart Oval

=== Second Semi Final ===
(Sunday, 7 September 1980)

- Hobart: 4.4 (28) | 9.6 (60) | 16.8 (104) | 18.8 (116)
- Glenorchy: 2.2 (14) | 6.7 (43) | 8.12 (60) | 12.20 (92)
- Attendance: 5,714 at North Hobart Oval

=== Preliminary Final ===
(Saturday, 13 September 1980)

- Glenorchy: 5.2 (32) | 12.4 (76) | 16.11 (107) | 19.17 (131)
- New Norfolk: 2.3 (15) | 4.5 (29) | 5.8 (38) | 10.11 (71)
- Attendance: 7,630 at North Hobart Oval

=== Grand Final ===
(Saturday, 20 September 1980)

- Hobart: 2.2 (14) | 7.5 (47) | 10.8 (68) | 14.9 (93)
- Glenorchy: 3.3 (21) | 3.4 (22) | 5.9 (39) | 7.16 (58)
- Attendance: 17,111 at North Hobart Oval

Source: All scores and statistics courtesy of the Hobart Mercury and Saturday Evening Mercury (SEM) publications.
