= 1979 TANFL season =

Australian rules football season

- Teams: Clarence Kangaroos; Glenorchy Magpies; Hobart Tigers; New Norfolk Eagles; North Hobart Demons; Sandy Bay Seagulls
- Premiers: Clarence
- Minor premiers: Glenorchy

Attendance
- Matches played: 64
- Total attendance: 160,950 (2,515 per match)

The 1979 Tasmanian Australian National Football League (TANFL) premiership season was an Australian rules football competition staged in Hobart, Tasmania over twenty (20) roster rounds and four (4) finals series matches between 7 April and 22 September 1979.

This was the centenary season of the Tasmanian Football League, the finals series was sponsored by the Winfield tobacco company to the tune of A$10,000.

The Grand Final of this year set an all-time record football match attendance in Tasmania of 24,968 patrons, this was also a single-day sporting record attendance in the state of Tasmania for twenty five years until it was broken when a crowd of 30,150 attended Symmons Plains Raceway in Northern Tasmania for a V8 Supercar Championship event in 2004.

== Participating Clubs ==
- Clarence District Football Club
- Glenorchy District Football Club
- Hobart Football Club
- New Norfolk District Football Club
- North Hobart Football Club
- Sandy Bay Football Club

=== 1979 TANFL Club Coaches ===
- Noel Leary (Clarence)
- Jack Rough (Glenorchy)
- Mal Pascoe (Hobart)
- Hedley Thompson (New Norfolk)
- John Chick (North Hobart)
- Graeme Mackey (Sandy Bay)

=== TANFL Reserves Grand Final ===
- New Norfolk 10.15 (75) v Glenorchy 6.14 (50) – North Hobart Oval

=== TANFL Under-19's Grand Final ===
- Clarence 14.15 (99) v Sandy Bay 8.14 (62) – North Hobart Oval

=== TANFL Under-17's Grand Final ===
- Hobart 13.10 (88) v Glenorchy 9.7 (61) – New Town Oval

=== Interstate Matches ===
TFL Centenary Interstate Match (Monday, 18 June 1979)

- Victoria 26.21 (177) v Tasmania 8.14 (62) – Att: 12,197 at North Hobart Oval

See: 1979 Perth State of Origin Carnival

Section One Qualifying Match (Thursday, 4 October 1979)

- Tasmania 17.20 (122) v Queensland 13.12 (90) at Perth Oval

Semi Final 1 (Saturday, 6 October 1979)

- Western Australia 23.33 (171) v Tasmania 9.10 (64) - Att: 15,186 at Subiaco Oval

3rd Place Playoff (Monday, 8 October 1979)

- South Australia 22.20 (152) v Tasmania 17.11 (113) - Att: 30,876 at Subiaco Oval

=== Intrastate Matches ===
Jubilee Shield (Wednesday, 25 April 1979)

- TANFL 21.21 (147) v NTFA 15.13 (103) – Att: 5,954 at North Hobart Oval

Jubilee Shield (Saturday, 26 May 1979)

- NWFU 13.13 (91) v TANFL 10.12 (72) – Att: 3,148 at Devonport Oval

=== Leading Goalkickers: TANFL ===
- Peter Hudson (Glenorchy) – 179 (TFL Record)
- Paul Courto (Hobart) – 71
- L.Barwick (Nth Hobart) – 53
- Michael Elliot (Sandy Bay) – 48

=== Medal Winners ===
- Peter Hudson (Glenorchy) – William Leitch Medal
- Noel Bester (New Norfolk) – George Watt Medal (Reserves)
- Mark Kreune (Clarence) – V.A Geard Medal (Under-19's)
- Gary Webster (Nth Hobart) – D.R Plaister Medal (Under-17's)
- Murray Dickson (Hobart) & Scott Brain (Hobart) – Weller Arnold Medal (Best TANFL player in Intrastate Matches)

== 1979 TANFL Ladder ==
Pos	Team	Pld	W	L	D	PF	PA	PP	Pts
1	Glenorchy	20	18	2	0	2661	1430	186.1	72
2	Clarence	20	14	6	0	1784	1679	106.3	56
3	Sandy Bay	20	10	10	0	1507	1591	94.7	40
4	North Hobart	20	9	11	0	1699	2139	79.4	36
5	New Norfolk	20	6	14	0	1669	1885	88.5	24
6	Hobart	20	3	17	0	1667	2253	74.0	12

=== Round 1 ===
(Saturday, 7 April 1979)

- Nth Hobart 9.15 (69) v Sandy Bay 7.10 (52) – Att: 2,080 at North Hobart Oval
- Glenorchy 21.15 (141) v New Norfolk 14.11 (95) – Att: 2,435 at KGV Football Park
- Clarence 12.14 (86) v Hobart 7.17 (59) – Att: 1,885 at Bellerive Oval

=== Round 2 ===
(Saturday, 14 April & Monday, 16 April 1979)

- Nth Hobart 14.12 (96) v Clarence 13.12 (90) – Att: 2,911 at North Hobart Oval
- Sandy Bay 14.11 (95) v New Norfolk 6.14 (50) – Att: 1,346 at Boyer Oval
- Glenorchy 15.24 (114) v Hobart 12.15 (87) – Att: 3,653 at North Hobart Oval (Monday)

=== Round 3 ===
(Saturday, 21 April 1979)

- New Norfolk 14.16 (100) v Hobart 12.17 (89) – Att: 1,475 at North Hobart Oval
- Clarence 10.19 (79) v Sandy Bay 5.6 (36) – Att: 1,771 at Queenborough Oval
- Glenorchy 31.14 (200) v Nth Hobart 8.9 (57) – Att: 3,412 at KGV Football Park

=== Round 4 ===
(Saturday, 28 April 1979)

- Glenorchy 17.19 (121) v Sandy Bay 6.7 (43) – Att: 3,144 at North Hobart Oval
- Nth Hobart 20.18 (138) v Hobart 14.16 (100) – Att: 1,356 at TCA Ground
- Clarence 15.8 (98) v New Norfolk 12.12 (84) – Att: 2,077 at Boyer Oval

=== Round 5 ===
(Saturday, 5 May 1979)

- Nth Hobart 17.11 (113) v New Norfolk 10.14 (74) – Att: 2,221 at North Hobart Oval
- Sandy Bay 12.14 (86) v Hobart 10.9 (69) – Att: 1,307 at Queenborough Oval
- Clarence 14.11 (95) v Glenorchy 10.22 (82) – Att: 3,095 at Bellerive Oval

=== Round 6 ===
(Saturday, 12 May 1979)

- Sandy Bay 10.19 (79) v Nth Hobart 6.12 (48) – Att: 2,323 at North Hobart Oval
- Hobart 16.9 (105) v Clarence 13.17 (95) – Att: 1,681 at TCA Ground
- Glenorchy 18.9 (117) v New Norfolk 13.17 (95) – Att: 1,718 at Boyer Oval

=== Round 7 ===
(Saturday, 19 May 1979)

- Sandy Bay 15.12 (102) v New Norfolk 8.16 (64) – Att: 1,936 at North Hobart Oval
- Glenorchy 27.19 (181) v Hobart 7.9 (51) – Att: 2,270 at KGV Football Park
- Clarence 18.22 (130) v Nth Hobart 9.8 (62) – Att: 2,514 at Bellerive Oval

=== Round 8 ===
(Saturday, 26 May 1979)

- Glenorchy 17.17 (119) v Nth Hobart 8.15 (63) – Att: 2,554 at North Hobart Oval
- Hobart 13.17 (95) v New Norfolk 8.14 (62) – Att: 942 at TCA Ground
- Clarence 12.14 (86) v Sandy Bay 7.10 (52) – Att: 2,539 at Bellerive Oval

=== Round 9 ===
(Saturday, 2 June 1979)

- Nth Hobart 17.15 (117) v Hobart 14.10 (94) – Att: 2,051 at North Hobart Oval
- Glenorchy 16.21 (117) v Sandy Bay 5.7 (37) – Att: 1,505 at Queenborough Oval
- Clarence 13.13 (91) v New Norfolk 13.9 (87) – Att: 1,430 at KGV Football Park

=== Round 10 ===
(Saturday, 9 June & Sunday, 10 June 1979)

- Glenorchy 23.17 (155) v Clarence 7.9 (51) – Att: 4,142 at North Hobart Oval
- Sandy Bay 15.20 (110) v Hobart 15.15 (105) – Att: 864 at TCA Ground
- New Norfolk 14.22 (106) v Nth Hobart 6.14 (50) – Att: 1,140 at Boyer Oval (Sunday)

=== Round 11 ===
(Saturday, 23 June 1979)

- Sandy Bay 16.11 (107) v Nth Hobart 10.21 (81) – Att: 1,415 at Queenborough Oval
- Glenorchy 13.15 (93) v New Norfolk 10.12 (72) – Att: 2,215 at KGV Football Park
- Clarence 13.19 (97) v Hobart 8.13 (61) – Att: 1,539 at Bellerive Oval

=== Round 12 ===
(Saturday, 30 June 1979)

- Nth Hobart 12.17 (89) v Clarence 8.16 (64) – Att: 1,455 at North Hobart Oval
- Glenorchy 29.15 (189) v Hobart 9.13 (67) – Att: 1,067 at TCA Ground *
- Sandy Bay 12.12 (84) v New Norfolk 8.13 (61) – Att: 819 at Queenborough Oval

Note: Peter Hudson kicks all-time TANFL record of 18 goals in this match and kicks his 100th goal for the season.

=== Round 13 ===
(Saturday, 7 July & Sunday, 8 July 1979)

- Clarence 8.15 (63) v Sandy Bay 8.14 (62) – Att: 2,287 at North Hobart Oval
- New Norfolk 20.16 (136) v Hobart 10.14 (74) – Att: 909 at Boyer Oval
- Glenorchy 12.19 (91) v Nth Hobart 6.15 (51) – Att: 2,619 at KGV Football Park (Sunday)

=== Round 14 ===
(Saturday, 14 July 1979)

- Nth Hobart 15.12 (102) v Hobart 14.12 (96) – Att: 1,461 at North Hobart Oval
- Glenorchy 14.19 (103) v Sandy Bay 7.10 (52) – Att: 2,293 at KGV Football Park
- Clarence 16.14 (110) v New Norfolk 13.9 (87) – Att: 1,681 at Bellerive Oval

=== Round 15 ===
(Saturday, 21 July 1979)

- New Norfolk 15.17 (107) v Nth Hobart 14.11 (95) – Att: 1,335 at North Hobart Oval
- Sandy Bay 14.19 (103) v Hobart 9.21 (75) – Att: 885 at TCA Ground
- Glenorchy 17.18 (120) v Clarence 13.11 (89) – Att: 3,055 at KGV Football Park

=== Round 16 ===
(Saturday, 28 July 1979)

- Clarence 11.17 (83) v Hobart 9.15 (69) – Att: 1,420 at North Hobart Oval
- Sandy Bay 20.11 (131) v Nth Hobart 9.14 (68) – Att: 1,484 at Queenborough Oval
- Glenorchy 16.19 (115) v New Norfolk 10.11 (71) – Att: 1,738 at Boyer Oval

=== Round 17 ===
(Saturday, 4 August 1979)

- Clarence 16.18 (114) v Nth Hobart 15.10 (100) – Att: 2,670 at North Hobart Oval
- Glenorchy 27.18 (180) v Hobart 13.15 (93) – Att: 1,356 at TCA Ground
- New Norfolk 9.18 (72) v Sandy Bay 6.9 (45) – Att: 1,003 at KGV Football Park

=== Round 18 ===
(Saturday, 11 August 1979)

- Glenorchy 29.15 (189) v Nth Hobart 11.9 (75) – Att: 1,154 at North Hobart Oval *
- New Norfolk 10.20 (80) v Hobart 10.17 (77) – Att: 531 at TCA Ground
- Sandy Bay 12.11 (83) v Clarence 8.7 (55) – Att: 759 at Queenborough Oval

Note: Peter Hudson kicks second highest TANFL goal total of all-time (to that stage) with 16.4.

=== Round 19 ===
(Saturday, 18 August 1979)

- Clarence 13.11 (89) v New Norfolk 11.13 (79) – Att: 1,850 at North Hobart Oval
- Nth Hobart 15.23 (113) v Hobart 15.19 (109) – Att: 1,000 at TCA Ground
- Glenorchy 18.15 (123) v Sandy Bay 9.13 (67) – Att: 2,620 at KGV Football Park

=== Round 20 ===
(Saturday, 25 August 1979)

- Hobart 11.16 (82) v Sandy Bay 11.15 (81) – Att: 1,297 at North Hobart Oval
- Clarence 18.11 (119) v Glenorchy 16.15 (111) – Att: 2,972 at Bellerive Oval
- Nth Hobart 16.16 (112) v New Norfolk 13.9 (87) – Att: 977 at Boyer Oval

=== First Semi Final ===
(Saturday, 1 September 1979)

- Sandy Bay: 3.3 (21) | 9.7 (61) | 14.12 (96) | 18.12 (120)
- Nth Hobart: 1.0 (6) | 4.3 (27) | 5.8 (38) | 6.13 (49)
- Attendance: 5,629 at North Hobart Oval

=== Second Semi Final ===
(Saturday, 8 September 1979)

- Glenorchy: 4.4 (28) | 8.5 (53) | 12.7 (79) | 19.8 (122)
- Clarence: 3.4 (22) | 5.7 (37) | 8.11 (59) | 11.12 (78)
- Attendance: 10,282 at North Hobart Oval

=== Preliminary Final ===
(Saturday, 15 September 1979)

- Clarence: 3.3 (21) | 5.9 (39) | 7.16 (58) | 10.19 (79)
- Sandy Bay: 0.2 (2) | 1.3 (9) | 4.6 (30) | 9.6 (60)
- Attendance: 8,428 at North Hobart Oval

=== Grand Final ===
(Saturday, 22 September 1979)

- Clarence: 3.4 (22) | 9.6 (60) | 10.8 (68) | 12.11 (83)
- Glenorchy: 4.7 (31) | 6.8 (44) | 10.13 (73) | 11.14 (80)
- Attendance: 24,968 at North Hobart Oval (Including 2,683 pre-sold tickets) (Tasmanian Record)
