= 1982 TANFL season =

Australian rules football season in Tasmania

- Teams: Clarence Kangaroos; Glenorchy Magpies; Hobart Tigers; New Norfolk Eagles; North Hobart Demons; Sandy Bay Seagulls
- Premiers: New Norfolk
- Minor premiers: New Norfolk; 5th minor premiership

Attendance
- Matches played: 64
- Total attendance: 163,174 (2,550 per match)

The 1982 Tasmanian Australian National Football League (TANFL) premiership season was an Australian rules football competition staged in Hobart, Tasmania over twenty (20) roster rounds and four finals series matches between 3 April and 18 September 1982. The League was known as the Winfield League under a A$36,000 commercial naming-rights sponsorship agreement with the Winfield tobacco company.

== Participating Clubs ==
- Clarence District Football Club
- Glenorchy District Football Club
- Hobart Football Club
- New Norfolk District Football Club
- North Hobart Football Club
- Sandy Bay Football Club

=== 1982 TANFL Club Coaches ===
- Noel Leary (Clarence)
- Garry Davidson (Glenorchy)
- Bruce Greenhill (Hobart)
- Robbie Dykes (New Norfolk)
- John Thurley (North Hobart)
- Gary Linton (Sandy Bay)

=== Midas Mufflers League (Reserves) Grand Final ===
(Saturday, 25 September 1982)

- Glenorchy 23.11 (149) v Clarence 9.16 (70) – North Hobart Oval

Note: Played one week after the senior Grand Final due to a drawn Preliminary Final.

=== CBA League (Under-19's) Grand Final ===
- Clarence 16.18 (114) v Nth Hobart 6.11 (47) – North Hobart Oval

=== TANFL Fourths (Under-17's) Grand Final ===
- Not Available.

=== Leading Goalkickers: TANFL ===
- Brett Stephens (Nth Hobart) – 92
- Wayne Fox (New Norfolk) – 76
- Andrew Vanderfeen (Clarence) – 49
- Ricky Hanlon (New Norfolk) – 47

=== Medal Winners ===
- Tony Martyn (Sandy Bay) – William Leitch Medal
- Steven Strong (Hobart) – George Watt Medal (Reserves)
- Peter Sherwood (Sandy Bay) – V.A Geard Medal (Under-19's)
- Mark Hall (New Norfolk) – D.R Plaister Medal (Under-17's)

=== Interstate Matches ===
Escort Shield (Sunday, 18 April 1982)

- Tasmania 17.14 (116) v ACT 11.13 (79) – Att: 5,866 at North Hobart Oval

Escort Shield (Sunday, 2 May 1982)

- Tasmania 20.10 (130) v New South Wales 11.19 (85) – Att: 7,704 at North Hobart Oval

Escort Shield (Sunday, 6 June 1982)

- Tasmania 18.10 (118) v Queensland 14.19 (103) – Att: 3,100 at Chelmer Oval, Brisbane

== 1982 TANFL Ladder ==
| Pos | Team | Pld | W | L | D | PF | PA | PP | Pts |
|---|---|---|---|---|---|---|---|---|---|
| 1 | New Norfolk | 20 | 15 | 5 | 0 | 2300 | 1780 | 129.2 | 60 |
| 2 | Glenorchy | 20 | 15 | 5 | 0 | 2295 | 1901 | 120.7 | 60 |
| 3 | Clarence | 20 | 12 | 8 | 0 | 2008 | 1952 | 102.9 | 48 |
| 4 | North Hobart | 20 | 10 | 10 | 0 | 2004 | 2097 | 95.6 | 40 |
| 5 | Sandy Bay | 20 | 4 | 16 | 0 | 1769 | 2103 | 84.1 | 16 |
| 6 | Hobart | 20 | 4 | 16 | 0 | 1892 | 2435 | 77.7 | 16 |

=== Round 1 ===
(Saturday, 3 April 1982)

- New Norfolk 14.24 (108) v Hobart 8.18 (66) – Att: 2,147 at North Hobart Oval
- Clarence 13.6 (84) v Sandy Bay 10.19 (79) – Att: 1,779 at Queenborough Oval
- Nth Hobart 20.11 (131) v Glenorchy 13.10 (88) – Att: 1,935 at KGV Football Park

=== Round 2 ===
(Saturday, 10 April & Monday, 12 April 1982)

- Clarence 13.13 (91) v New Norfolk 10.8 (68) Att: 3,740 at North Hobart Oval
- Nth Hobart 18.13 (121) v Sandy Bay 14.13 (97) - Att: 1,838 at Queenborough Oval
- Glenorchy 12.13 (85) v Hobart 11.11 (77) - Att: 2,924 at North Hobart Oval (Monday)

=== Round 3 ===
(Saturday, 17 April 1982)

- Glenorchy 12.16 (88) v Sandy Bay 11.12 (78) – Att: 1,304 at Queenborough Oval
- Clarence 15.15 (105) v Hobart 12.6 (78) – Att: 2,247 at Bellerive Oval
- New Norfolk 16.17 (113) v Nth Hobart 8.17 (65) – Att: 1,845 at Boyer Oval

=== Round 4 ===
(Saturday, 24 April 1982)

- Clarence 23.18 (156) v Nth Hobart 18.13 (121) – Att: 3,078 at North Hobart Oval
- Sandy Bay 16.16 (112) v Hobart 12.12 (84) – Att: 969 at TCA Ground
- Glenorchy 18.12 (120) v New Norfolk 9.14 (68) – Att: 3,052 at KGV Football Park

=== Round 5 ===
(Saturday, 8 May 1982)

- Nth Hobart 17.13 (115) v Hobart 11.7 (73) – Att: 1,904 at North Hobart Oval
- Glenorchy 14.15 (99) v Clarence 10.12 (72) – Att: 2,724 at KGV Football Park
- New Norfolk 21.22 (148) v Sandy Bay 10.5 (65) – Att: 1,387 at Boyer Oval

=== Round 6 ===
(Saturday, 15 May 1982)

- Nth Hobart 21.10 (136) v Glenorchy 20.15 (135) – Att: 3,049 at North Hobart Oval
- New Norfolk 20.20 (140) v Hobart 12.14 (86) – Att: 1,273 at TCA Ground
- Clarence 18.17 (125) v Sandy Bay 16.12 (108) – Att: 2,046 at Bellerive Oval

=== Round 7 ===
(Saturday, 22 May 1982)

- Nth Hobart 14.20 (104) v Sandy Bay 8.11 (59) – Att: 1,796 at North Hobart Oval
- Glenorchy 23.14 (152) v Hobart 17.11 (113) – Att: 1,479 at KGV Football Park
- Clarence 14.15 (99) v New Norfolk 9.10 (64) – Att: 2,334 at Bellerive Oval

=== Round 8 ===
(Saturday, 29 May 1982)

- New Norfolk 25.7 (157) v Nth Hobart 10.15 (75) – Att: 2,760 at North Hobart Oval
- Hobart 27.14 (176) v Clarence 11.20 (86) – Att: 1,466 at TCA Ground
- Glenorchy 12.16 (88) v Sandy Bay 13.9 (87) – Att: 1,650 at KGV Football Park

=== Round 9 ===
(Saturday, 5 June 1982)

- Hobart 19.13 (127) v Sandy Bay 17.13 (115) – Att: 1,594 at North Hobart Oval
- Nth Hobart 11.11 (77) v Clarence 8.15 (63) – Att: 2,100 at Bellerive Oval
- New Norfolk 21.24 (150) v Glenorchy 9.6 (60) – Att: 1,870 at Boyer Oval

=== Round 10 ===
(Saturday, 12 June & Monday, 14 June 1982)

- New Norfolk 13.19 (97) v Sandy Bay 13.10 (88) – Att: 1,731 at North Hobart Oval
- Hobart 19.24 (138) v Nth Hobart 15.18 (108) – Att: 1,929 at TCA Ground
- Glenorchy 20.9 (129) v Clarence 14.10 (94) – Att: 3,920 at North Hobart Oval (Monday)

=== Round 11 ===
(Saturday, 19 June 1982)

- Clarence 13.18 (96) v Sandy Bay 10.13 (73) – Att: 2,073 at North Hobart Oval
- Nth Hobart 13.22 (100) v Glenorchy 12.20 (92) – Att: 2,626 at KGV Football Park
- New Norfolk 23.17 (155) v Hobart 15.11 (101) – Att: 1,870 at Boyer Oval

=== Round 12 ===
(Saturday, 26 June 1982)

- Sandy Bay 14.8 (92) v Nth Hobart 8.5 (53) – Att: 2,016 at North Hobart Oval
- Glenorchy 26.18 (174) v Hobart 13.15 (93) – Att: 1,573 at TCA Ground
- Clarence 22.13 (145) v New Norfolk 7.13 (55) – Att: 2,416 at Boyer Oval

=== Round 13 ===
(Saturday, 3 July 1982)

- New Norfolk 16.11 (107) v Nth Hobart 12.15 (87) – Att: 1,997 at North Hobart Oval
- Glenorchy 18.10 (118) v Sandy Bay 11.12 (78) – Att: 1,715 at Queenborough Oval
- Clarence 17.13 (115) v Hobart 13.16 (94) – Att: 1,792 at Bellerive Oval

=== Round 14 ===
(Saturday, 10 July 1982)

- Nth Hobart 15.17 (107) v Clarence 15.14 (104) – Att: 2,499 at North Hobart Oval
- Hobart 9.9 (63) v Sandy Bay 6.12 (48) – Att: 914 at TCA Ground
- New Norfolk 19.16 (130) v Glenorchy 13.12 (90) – Att: 2,651 at KGV Football Park

=== Round 15 ===
(Saturday, 17 July 1982)

- Nth Hobart 16.20 (116) v Hobart 14.12 (96) – Att: 1,822 at North Hobart Oval
- New Norfolk 22.14 (146) v Sandy Bay 8.5 (53) – Att: 1,210 at Boyer Oval
- Glenorchy 11.19 (85) v Clarence 10.22 (82) – Att: 2,740 at Bellerive Oval

=== Round 16 ===
(Saturday, 24 July 1982)

- New Norfolk 17.19 (121) v Hobart 16.16 (112) – Att: 1,446 at North Hobart Oval
- Glenorchy 13.13 (91) v Nth Hobart 9.14 (68) – Att: 2,906 at KGV Football Park
- Clarence 18.8 (116) v Sandy Bay 13.10 (88) – Att: 1,616 at Bellerive Oval

=== Round 17 ===
(Saturday, 31 July 1982)

- Sandy Bay 18.19 (127) v Nth Hobart 17.7 (109) – Att: 1,520 at North Hobart Oval
- Glenorchy 22.11 (143) v Hobart 8.18 (66) – Att: 1,566 at KGV Football Park
- New Norfolk 20.15 (135) v Clarence 9.19 (73) – Att: 2,746 at Bellerive Oval

=== Round 18 ===
(Saturday, 7 August 1982)

- Clarence 21.16 (142) v Hobart 7.14 (56) – Att: 1,716 at North Hobart Oval
- Glenorchy 21.13 (139) v Sandy Bay 16.7 (103) – Att: 1,761 at Queenborough Oval
- New Norfolk 16.19 (115) v Nth Hobart 11.15 (81) – Att: 1,798 at Boyer Oval

=== Round 19 ===
(Saturday, 14 August 1982)

- Glenorchy 21.17 (143) v New Norfolk 17.17 (119) – Att: 3,319 at North Hobart Oval
- Sandy Bay 23.11 (149) v Hobart 14.9 (93) – Att: 915 at Queenborough Oval
- Clarence 16.8 (104) v Nth Hobart 12.12 (84) – Att: 2,257 at Bellerive Oval

=== Round 20 ===
(Saturday, 21 August 1982)

- Glenorchy 27.14 (176) v Clarence 8.8 (56) – Att: 3,921 at North Hobart Oval
- Nth Hobart 21.26 (152) v Hobart 13.22 (100) – Att: 1,234 at TCA Ground*
- New Norfolk 14.20 (104) v Sandy Bay 11.14 (80) – Att: 1,104 at Queenborough Oval*

Note: This round marked the final matches (at the time) to be played at the TCA Ground and Queenborough Oval.

=== First Semi Final ===
(Saturday, 28 August 1982)

- Clarence: 4.3 (27) | 7.7 (49) | 11.10 (76) | 17.15 (117)
- Nth Hobart: 3.2 (20) | 4.7 (31) | 9.11 (65) | 11.12 (78)
- Attendance: 6,785 at North Hobart Oval

=== Second Semi Final ===
(Saturday, 4 September 1982)

- Glenorchy: 7.2 (44) | 11.4 (70) | 14.7 (91) | 19.10 (124)
- New Norfolk: 2.8 (20) | 7.13 (55) | 14.18 (102) | 17.20 (122)
- Attendance: 7,502 at North Hobart Oval

=== Preliminary Final ===
(Saturday, 11 September 1982)

- New Norfolk: 4.3 (27) | 9.7 (61) | 15.11 (101) | 17.14 (116)
- Clarence: 0.1 (1) | 1.5 (11) | 4.7 (31) | 8.13 (61)
- Attendance: 9,147 at North Hobart Oval

=== Grand Final ===
(Saturday, 18 September 1982)

- New Norfolk: 6.2 (38) | 9.4 (58) | 12.7 (79) | 13.9 (87)
- Glenorchy: 1.3 (9) | 2.5 (17) | 5.9 (39) | 11.10 (76)
- Attendance: 16,124 at North Hobart Oval

Source: All scores and statistics courtesy of the Hobart Mercury and Saturday Evening Mercury (SEM) publications.
