= 1978 TANFL season =

Australian rules football season

- Teams: Clarence Kangaroos; Glenorchy Magpies; Hobart Tigers; New Norfolk Eagles; North Hobart Demons; Sandy Bay Seagulls
- Premiers: Sandy Bay
- Minor premiers: Sandy Bay; 8th minor premiership

Attendance
- Matches played: 64
- Total attendance: 166,648 (2,604 per match)

The 1978 Tasmanian Australian National Football League (TANFL) premiership season was an Australian rules football competition staged in Hobart, Tasmania over twenty (20) roster rounds and four (4) finals series matches between 1 April and 16 September 1978. The competition's major sponsor was Hitachi.

== Participating Clubs ==
- Clarence District Football Club
- Glenorchy District Football Club
- Hobart Football Club
- New Norfolk District Football Club
- North Hobart Football Club
- Sandy Bay Football Club

=== 1978 TANFL Club Coaches ===
- Eric Pascoe (Clarence)
- Jack Rough (Glenorchy)
- Mal Pascoe (Hobart)
- Peter Chisnall (New Norfolk)
- Ian Bremner (North Hobart)
- Paul Sproule (Sandy Bay)

=== TANFL Reserves Grand Final ===
- North Hobart 12.20 (92) v Glenorchy 11.13 (79) – North Hobart Oval

=== TANFL Under-19's Grand Final ===
- North Hobart 20.13 (133) v Clarence 11.16 (82) – North Hobart Oval

=== TANFL Under-17's Grand Final ===
- North Hobart 15.10 (100) v Glenorchy 8.8 (56) – New Town Oval

=== State Preliminary Final ===
(Saturday, 23 September 1978)

- Sandy Bay: 7.5 (47) | 7.6 (48) | 14.11 (95) | 20.17 (137)
- North Launceston: 1.0 (6) | 7.3 (45) | 8.6 (54) | 11.7 (73)
- Attendance: 4,425 at North Hobart Oval

=== State Grand Final ===
(Sunday, 1 October 1978)

- Cooee: 5.6 (36) | 8.12 (60) | 13.19 (97) | 19.25 (139)
- Sandy Bay: 2.4 (16) | 6.8 (44) | 9.16 (70) | 16.17 (113)
- Attendance: 3,860 at West Park Oval

=== Interstate Matches ===
Interstate Match (Tuesday, 25 April 1978)

- ACT 17.7 (109) v Tasmania 16.9 (105) – Attendance: N/A at Manuka Oval, Canberra

Interstate Match (Sunday, 7 May 1978)

- Queensland 16.9 (105) v Tasmania 12.11 (83) – Attendance: 10,000 at The Gabba, Brisbane

Interstate Match (Saturday, 10 June 1978)

- Victoria 25.11 (161) v Tasmania 18.6 (114) – Attendance: 17,119 at North Hobart Oval *

Note: Includes 343 pre-sold family pass tickets.

=== Intrastate Matches ===
Jubilee Shield (Saturday, 29 April 1978)

- TANFL 19.8 (122) v NTFA 13.13 (91) – Attendance: N/A at York Park

Jubilee Shield (Saturday, 13 May 1978)

- TANFL 15.17 (107) v NWFU 15.11 (101) – Attendance: 5,691 at North Hobart Oval

=== Leading Goalkickers: TANFL ===
- Peter Hudson (Glenorchy) – 153
- Michael Elliot (Sandy Bay) – 106
- Bob Smith (North Hobart) – 88
- Paul Courto (Hobart) – 78

=== Medal Winners ===
- Peter Hudson (Glenorchy) – William Leitch Medal
- Henry Pastoor (Sandy Bay) – George Watt Medal (Reserves)
- Jamie McIntyre (Hobart) – V.A Geard Medal (Under-19's)
- Tim Carter (Clarence) & Jamie Woolley (Glenorchy) – D.R Plaister Medal (Under-17's)
- Robbie Dykes (Glenorchy) – Weller Arnold Medal (Best player in Interstate Match)

== 1978 TANFL Ladder ==
Pos	Team	Pld	W	L	D	PF	PA	PP	Pts
1	Sandy Bay	20	16	4	0	2160	1248	173.1	64
2	Glenorchy	20	14	6	0	2028	1635	124.0	56
3	New Norfolk	20	9	11	0	1815	1907	95.2	36
4	North Hobart	20	9	11	0	1741	1864	93.4	36
5	Clarence	20	6	14	0	1460	1988	73.4	24
6	Hobart	20	6	14	0	1541	2155	71.5	24

=== Round 1 ===
(Saturday, 1 April 1978)

- North Hobart 17.10 (112) v Clarence 10.16 (76) – Attendance: 3,174 at North Hobart Oval
- Glenorchy 20.10 (130) v Hobart 11.15 (81) – Attendance: 2,379 at KGV Football Park
- Sandy Bay 16.14 (110) v New Norfolk 8.12 (60) – Attendance: 1,922 at Boyer Oval

=== Round 2 ===
(Saturday, 8 April 1978)

- Glenorchy 14.14 (98) v New Norfolk 11.16 (82) – Attendance: 3,281 at North Hobart Oval
- Sandy Bay 19.28 (142) v North Hobart 4.6 (30) – Attendance: 2,512 at Queenborough Oval
- Hobart 12.11 (83) v Clarence 9.10 (64) – Attendance: 1,880 at Bellerive Oval

=== Round 3 ===
(Saturday, 15 April 1978)

- North Hobart 15.10 (100) v Glenorchy 15.8 (98) – Attendance: 4,249 at North Hobart Oval
- New Norfolk 16.15 (111) v Hobart 15.14 (104) – Attendance: 1,377 at TCA Ground
- Sandy Bay 15.12 (102) v Clarence 7.13 (55) – Attendance: 1,307 at KGV Football Park

=== Round 4 ===
(Saturday, 22 April. Sunday, 23 April & Tuesday, 25 April 1978)

- Glenorchy 21.17 (143) v Clarence 13.15 (93) – Attendance: 4,138 at North Hobart Oval (Saturday)
- New Norfolk 16.20 (116) v North Hobart 9.16 (70) – Attendance: 2,757 at Boyer Oval (Sunday)
- Hobart 11.19 (85) v Sandy Bay 11.11 (77) – Attendance: 2,864 at North Hobart Oval (Tuesday)

=== Round 5 ===
(Saturday, 29 April 1978)

- North Hobart 19.14 (128) v Hobart 9.10 (64) – Attendance: 2,680 at North Hobart Oval
- Sandy Bay 15.12 (102) v Glenorchy 7.17 (59) – Attendance: 1,898 at Queenborough Oval
- Clarence 15.11 (101) v New Norfolk 11.16 (82) – Attendance: 1,253 at KGV Football Park

=== Round 6 ===
(Saturday, 6 May 1978)

- Glenorchy 20.19 (139) v Hobart 10.12 (72) – Attendance: 2,754 at North Hobart Oval
- Sandy Bay 16.16 (112) v New Norfolk 11.19 (85) – Attendance: 1,421 at Queenborough Oval
- Clarence 14.13 (97) v North Hobart 12.15 (87) – Attendance: 1,922 at Bellerive Oval

=== Round 7 ===
(Saturday, 20 May 1978)

- North Hobart 17.11 (113) v Sandy Bay 13.14 (92) – Attendance: 1,416 at North Hobart Oval
- Clarence 16.12 (108) v Hobart 15.6 (96) – Attendance: 1,397 at TCA Ground *
- New Norfolk 17.14 (116) v Glenorchy 13.15 (93) – Attendance: 2,333 at KGV Football Park

Note: Clarence captain-coach Eric Pascoe controversially calls for a head-count during the final quarter in order to stop Hobart's momentum.

=== Round 8 ===
(Saturday, 27 May & Sunday, 28 May 1978)

- Sandy Bay 15.21 (111) v Clarence 4.11 (35) – Attendance: 2,915 at North Hobart Oval
- New Norfolk 18.19 (127) v Hobart 16.12 (108) – Attendance: 1,249 at Boyer Oval
- Glenorchy 15.13 (103) v North Hobart 6.5 (41) – Attendance: 4,147 at North Hobart Oval (Sunday)

=== Round 9 ===
(Saturday, 3 June & Monday, 5 June 1978)

- New Norfolk 15.15 (105) v North Hobart 9.10 (64) – Attendance: 2,598 at North Hobart Oval
- Sandy Bay 17.12 (114) v Hobart 5.7 (37) – Attendance: 1,018 at KGV Football Park
- Glenorchy 11.12 (78) v Clarence 7.7 (49) – Attendance: 2,556 at North Hobart Oval (Monday)

=== Round 10 ===
(Saturday, 17 June & Sunday, 18 June 1978)

- Clarence 12.10 (82) v New Norfolk 7.14 (56) – Attendance: 1,847 at North Hobart Oval
- North Hobart 19.11 (125) v Hobart 9.9 (63) – Attendance: 1,291 at TCA Ground
- Sandy Bay 13.7 (85) v Glenorchy 12.10 (82) – Attendance: 3,382 at KGV Football Park (Sunday)

=== Round 11 ===
(Saturday, 24 June 1978)

- Clarence 9.3 (57) v North Hobart 6.9 (45) – Attendance: 2,159 at North Hobart Oval
- Glenorchy 16.20 (116) v Hobart 4.8 (32) – Attendance: 1,216 at TCA Ground
- New Norfolk 11.13 (79) v Sandy Bay 6.15 (51) – Attendance: 1,100 at KGV Football Park

=== Round 12 ===
(Saturday, 1 July 1978)

- Hobart 14.19 (103) v Clarence 11.16 (82) – Attendance: 1,450 at TCA Ground
- Sandy Bay 22.15 (147) v North Hobart 5.8 (38) – Attendance: 1,630 at Queenborough Oval
- Glenorchy 15.12 (102) v New Norfolk 12.9 (81) – Attendance: 2,033 at Boyer Oval

=== Round 13 ===
(Saturday, 8 July 1978)

- Glenorchy 19.15 (129) v North Hobart 14.12 (96) – Attendance: 2,167 at North Hobart Oval
- Sandy Bay 12.23 (95) v Clarence 5.16 (46) – Attendance: 1,508 at Bellerive Oval
- Hobart 13.13 (91) v New Norfolk 12.15 (87) – Attendance: 935 at Boyer Oval

=== Round 14 ===
(Saturday, 15 July 1978)

- Sandy Bay 16.15 (111) v Hobart 10.9 (69) – Attendance: 1,289 at TCA Ground
- Glenorchy 17.14 (116) v Clarence 9.15 (69) – Attendance: 2,306 at KGV Football Park
- North Hobart 16.13 (109) v New Norfolk 9.12 (66) – Attendance: 1,400 at Boyer Oval

=== Round 15 ===
(Saturday, 22 July & Sunday, 23 July 1978)

- North Hobart 23.11 (149) v Hobart 9.12 (66) – Attendance: 2,124 at North Hobart Oval
- Sandy Bay 14.12 (96) v Glenorchy 10.11 (71) – Attendance: 2,790 at Queenborough Oval
- New Norfolk 14.18 (102) v Clarence 10.11 (71) – Attendance: 1,978 at Bellerive Oval (Sunday)

=== Round 16 ===
(Saturday, 29 July 1978)

- Sandy Bay 22.14 (146) v New Norfolk 9.15 (69) – Attendance: 1,936 at North Hobart Oval
- Glenorchy 19.13 (127) v Hobart 14.14 (98) – Attendance: 1,483 at TCA Ground
- Clarence 13.26 (104) v North Hobart 15.12 (102) – Attendance: 1,803 at Bellerive Oval

=== Round 17 ===
(Saturday, 5 August & Sunday, 6 August 1978)

- North Hobart 12.12 (84) v Sandy Bay 10.13 (73) – Attendance: 6,542 at North Hobart Oval
- Glenorchy 20.14 (134) v New Norfolk 13.12 (90) – Attendance: 1,860 at Boyer Oval
- Hobart 13.10 (88) v Clarence 8.15 (63) – Attendance: 1,670 at KGV Football Park (Sunday)

=== Round 18 ===
(Saturday, 12 August 1978)

- Hobart 13.10 (88) v New Norfolk 11.21 (87) – Attendance: 1,155 at North Hobart Oval
- Sandy Bay 23.17 (155) v Clarence 9.11 (65) – Attendance: 1,114 at Queenborough Oval
- Glenorchy 14.17 (101) v North Hobart 14.12 (96) – Attendance: 2,510 at KGV Football Park

=== Round 19 ===
(Saturday, 19 August 1978)

- New Norfolk 17.11 (113) v North Hobart 13.13 (91) – Attendance: 2,566 at North Hobart Oval
- Sandy Bay 21.18 (144) v Hobart 9.7 (61) – Attendance: 1,168 at Queenborough Oval
- Glenorchy 19.15 (129) v Clarence 9.10 (64) – Attendance: 1,715 at Bellerive Oval

=== Round 20 ===
(Saturday, 26 August 1978)

- Sandy Bay 13.14 (92) v Glenorchy 3.6 (24) – Attendance: 2,601 at North Hobart Oval *
- North Hobart 8.13 (61) v Hobart 7.10 (52) – Attendance: 828 at TCA Ground
- New Norfolk 14.17 (101) v Clarence 11.11 (77) – Attendance: 837 at Boyer Oval *

Note: Peter Hudson held goalless for the only time in his TFL career and Clarence wear their traditional Maroon and white V playing jumper for the final time.

=== First Semi Final ===
(Saturday, 2 September 1978)

- New Norfolk: 6.5 (41) | 11.7 (73) | 17.10 (112) | 20.14 (134)
- North Hobart: 3.3 (21) | 10.9 (69) | 15.16 (106) | 16.19 (115)
- Attendance: 6,489 at North Hobart Oval

=== Second Semi Final ===
(Sunday, 3 September 1978)

- Glenorchy: 4.4 (28) | 8.6 (54) | 16.11 (107) | 18.13 (121)
- Sandy Bay: 3.6 (24) | 6.10 (46) | 10.11 (71) | 11.15 (81)
- Attendance: 6,564 at North Hobart Oval

=== Preliminary Final ===
(Saturday, 9 September 1978)

- Sandy Bay: 2.2 (14) | 7.5 (47) | 9.9 (63) | 16.11 (107)
- New Norfolk: 1.3 (9) | 1.3 (9) | 3.7 (25) | 6.12 (48)
- Attendance: 9,145 at North Hobart Oval

=== Grand Final ===
(Saturday, 16 September 1978)

- Sandy Bay: 3.4 (22) | 7.6 (48) | 9.10 (64) | 11.14 (80)
- Glenorchy: 3.4 (22) | 5.8 (38) | 7.10 (52) | 9.15 (69)
- Attendance: 18,662 at North Hobart Oval
