= 1972 TANFL season =

Australian rules football season

- Teams: Clarence Kangaroos; Glenorchy Magpies; Hobart Tigers; New Norfolk Eagles; North Hobart Demons; Sandy Bay Seagulls
- Premiers: Sandy Bay
- Minor premiers: Sandy Bay; 4th minor premiership

Attendance
- Matches played: 64
- Total attendance: 247,430 (3,866 per match)

The 1972 Tasmanian Australian National Football League (TANFL) premiership season was an Australian rules football competition staged in Hobart, Tasmania over twenty (20) roster rounds and four finals series matches between 1 April and 16 September 1972.

== Participating Clubs ==
- Clarence District Football Club
- Glenorchy District Football Club
- Hobart Football Club
- New Norfolk District Football Club
- North Hobart Football Club
- Sandy Bay Football Club

=== 1972 TANFL Club Coaches ===
- John Bingley (Clarence)
- Trevor Sprigg (Glenorchy)
- Dennis Munari & Alan Appleton (Hobart)
- Ricky Graham (New Norfolk)
- Vin Crowe (North Hobart)
- Rod Olsson (Sandy Bay)

=== TANFL Reserves Grand Final ===
- Sandy Bay 10.12 (72) v Glenorchy 10.9 (69) – North Hobart Oval

=== TANFL Under-19's Grand Final ===
- Not Available.

=== State Preliminary Final ===
(Saturday, 23 September 1972)

- Latrobe: 12.14 (86)
- Sandy Bay: 4.8 (32)

=== State Grand Final ===
(Saturday, 30 September 1972)

- City-South: 4.2 (26) | 6.3 (39) | 8.7 (55) | 14.14 (98)
- Latrobe: 3.2 (20) | 6.9 (45) | 8.12 (60) | 8.14 (62)
- Attendance: 10,551 at York Park

=== State Trial Matches ===
Trial Match One (Saturday, 22 April 1972)

- Tasmania 16.14 (110) v TANFL 14.10 (94) – Att: 7,623 at North Hobart Oval

Trial Match Two (Saturday, 29 April 1972)

- NTFA 9.24 (78) v Tasmania 8.20 (68) – Att: 3,845 at York Park

Trial Match Three (Saturday, 27 May 1972)

- Tasmania 18.14 (122) v TANFL/NTFA/NWFU Combined 11.13 (79) – Att: 5,785 at York Park

=== Interstate Matches ===
See: 1972 Australian National Football Carnival

Match One (Saturday, 17 June 1972)

- Victoria 32.22 (214) v Tasmania 4.8 (32) – Att: N/A at Subiaco Oval

Match Three (Wednesday, 21 June 1972)

- Western Australia 17.23 (125) v Tasmania 12.7 (79) – Att: N/A at Subiaco Oval

Match Five (Saturday, 24 June 1972)

- South Australia 22.24 (156) v Tasmania 9.12 (66) – Att: N/A at Subiaco Oval

=== Leading Goalkickers: TANFL ===
- Darryl Sutton (Glenorchy) – 73
- John Richmond (Clarence) – 58
- Tony Wilton (New Norfolk) – 48
- Chris Saunders (Sandy Bay) – 46

=== Medal Winners ===
- Ricky Graham (New Norfolk) – William Leitch Medal
- Garry Rogers (Hobart) – George Watt Medal (Reserves)
- Leigh McConnon (Nth Hobart) & Gary Whittle (Hobart) – V.A Geard Medal (Under-19's)

== 1972 TANFL Ladder ==
Pos	Team	Pld	W	L	D	PF	PA	PP	Pts
1	Sandy Bay	20	15	5	0	2115	1608	131.5	60
2	New Norfolk	20	14	6	0	2029	1764	115.0	56
3	Hobart	20	10	10	0	1864	1858	100.3	40
4	Clarence	20	9	11	0	1929	1838	105.0	36
5	Glenorchy	20	9	11	0	1997	1962	101.8	36
6	North Hobart	20	3	17	0	1494	2392	62.5	12

=== Round 1 ===
(Saturday, 1 April & Monday, 3 April 1972)

- Sandy Bay 16.25 (121) v Nth Hobart 9.14 (68) – Att: 6,157 at North Hobart Oval
- Clarence 13.10 (88) v Hobart 6.22 (58) – Att: 3,364 at Bellerive Oval
- New Norfolk 15.22 (112) v Glenorchy 13.16 (94) – Att: 5,369 at North Hobart Oval (Monday)

=== Round 2 ===
(Saturday, 8 April 1972)

- Clarence 22.17 (149) v Glenorchy 16.7 (103) – Att: 5,731 at North Hobart Oval
- Sandy Bay 24.13 (157) v Hobart 9.8 (62) – Att: 3,409 at Queenborough Oval
- New Norfolk 15.19 (109) v Nth Hobart 12.13 (85) – Att: 2,671 at Boyer Oval

=== Round 3 ===
(Saturday, 15 April 1972)

- Clarence 23.16 (154) v Nth Hobart 9.14 (68) – Att: 5,182 at North Hobart Oval
- New Norfolk 13.15 (93) v Sandy Bay 11.15 (81) – Att: 2,983 at Boyer Oval
- Glenorchy 19.12 (126) v Hobart 14.11 (95) – Att: 2,468 at TCA Ground

=== Round 4 ===
(Tuesday, 25 April & Saturday, 29 April 1972)

- New Norfolk 17.14 (116) v Hobart 16.11 (107) – Att: 3,795 at North Hobart Oval
- Glenorchy 19.18 (132) v Nth Hobart 5.8 (38) – Att: 3,492 at KGV Football Park
- Sandy Bay 9.13 (67) v Clarence 7.8 (50) – Att: 6,724 at North Hobart Oval (Saturday)

=== Round 5 ===
(Saturday, 6 May 1972)

- Nth Hobart 13.22 (100) v Hobart 13.11 (89) – Att: 3,210 at North Hobart Oval
- New Norfolk 19.7 (121) v Clarence 13.20 (98) – Att: 3,889 at Bellerive Oval
- Glenorchy 20.10 (130) v Sandy Bay 15.11 (101) – Att: 3,700 at Queenborough Oval

=== Round 6 ===
(Saturday, 13 May 1972)

- Clarence 17.15 (117) v Hobart 13.13 (91) – Att: 3,494 at North Hobart Oval
- New Norfolk 12.11 (83) v Glenorchy 10.14 (74) – Att: 3,209 at Boyer Oval
- Sandy Bay 21.22 (148) v Nth Hobart 10.17 (77) – Att: 2,738 at Queenborough Oval

=== Round 7 ===
(Saturday, 20 May 1972)

- New Norfolk 17.12 (114) v Nth Hobart 15.13 (103) – Att: 3,131 at North Hobart Oval
- Hobart 16.14 (110) v Sandy Bay 13.9 (87) – Att: 2,285 at TCA Ground
- Clarence 15.13 (103) v Glenorchy 9.20 (74) – Att: 4,564 at KGV Football Park

=== Round 8 ===
(Saturday, 27 May 1972)

- Sandy Bay 17.19 (121) v New Norfolk 10.6 (66) – Att: 4,343 at North Hobart Oval
- Clarence 17.17 (119) v Nth Hobart 8.18 (66) – Att: 2,845 at Bellerive Oval
- Glenorchy 15.23 (113) v Hobart 11.12 (78) – Att: 2,263 at KGV Football Park

=== Round 9 ===
(Saturday, 3 June 1972)

- Nth Hobart 19.13 (127) v Glenorchy 19.12 (126) – Att: 3,489 at North Hobart Oval
- Sandy Bay 14.12 (96) v Clarence 12.12 (84) – Att: 4,781 at Queenborough Oval
- New Norfolk 19.14 (128) v Hobart 6.7 (43) – Att: 1,882 at Boyer Oval

=== Round 10 ===
(Saturday, 10 June & Monday, 12 June 1972)

- Sandy Bay 17.16 (118) v Glenorchy 14.9 (93) – Att: 3,568 at North Hobart Oval
- Hobart 15.13 (103) v Nth Hobart 7.14 (56) – Att: 1,902 at TCA Ground
- Clarence 15.15 (105) v New Norfolk 12.18 (90) – Att: 7,030 at North Hobart Oval

=== Round 11 ===
(Saturday, 17 June 1972)

- Sandy Bay 29.14 (188) v Nth Hobart 6.15 (51) – Att: 3,366 at North Hobart Oval
- Hobart 19.16 (130) v Clarence 12.15 (87) – Att: 2,533 at TCA Ground
- New Norfolk 19.12 (126) v Glenorchy 13.11 (89) – Att: 2,652 at KGV Football Park

=== Round 12 ===
(Saturday, 24 June 1972)

- Hobart 12.13 (85) v Sandy Bay 9.11 (65) – Att: 3,701 at North Hobart Oval
- New Norfolk 22.15 (147) v Nth Hobart 6.11 (47) – Att: 1,301 at Boyer Oval
- Glenorchy 14.17 (101) v Clarence 12.15 (87) – Att: 2,403 at Bellerive Oval

=== Round 13 ===
(Saturday, 1 July 1972)

- Nth Hobart 14.13 (97) v Clarence 12.15 (87) – Att: 2,786 at North Hobart Oval
- Sandy Bay 17.5 (107) v New Norfolk 13.15 (93) – Att: 2,808 at Queenborough Oval
- Hobart 17.23 (125) v Glenorchy 11.10 (76) – Att: 2,547 at TCA Ground

=== Round 14 ===
(Saturday, 8 July 1972)

- Glenorchy 16.22 (118) v Nth Hobart 13.16 (94) – Att: 3,337 at North Hobart Oval
- Sandy Bay 19.15 (129) v Clarence 15.19 (109) – Att: 3,330 at Bellerive Oval
- Hobart 14.11 (95) v New Norfolk 11.14 (80) – Att: 2,645 at TCA Ground

=== Round 15 ===
(Saturday, 15 July 1972)

- Hobart 20.18 (138) v Nth Hobart 11.13 (79) – Att: 3,251 at North Hobart Oval
- Sandy Bay 11.6 (72) v Glenorchy 10.8 (68) – Att: 2,822 at KGV Football Park
- New Norfolk 18.9 (117) v Clarence 13.21 (99) – Att: 1,824 at Boyer Oval

=== Round 16 ===
(Saturday, 22 July 1972)

- Glenorchy 17.7 (109) v New Norfolk 15.16 (106) – Att: 2,147 at North Hobart Oval
- Hobart 10.14 (74) v Clarence 7.11 (53) – Att: 2,372 at Bellerive Oval
- Sandy Bay 13.9 (87) v Nth Hobart 10.4 (64) – Att: 1,305 at Queenborough Oval

=== Round 17 ===
(Saturday, 29 July 1972)

- New Norfolk 12.17 (89) v Nth Hobart 8.11 (59) – Att: 1,590 at North Hobart Oval
- Sandy Bay 11.16 (82) v Hobart 7.14 (56) – Att: 2,801 at TCA Ground
- Glenorchy 20.13 (133) v Clarence 13.13 (91) – Att: 2,700 at KGV Football Park

=== Round 18 ===
(Saturday, 5 August 1972)

- Hobart 14.11 (95) v Glenorchy 13.13 (91) – Att: 4,974 at North Hobart Oval
- New Norfolk 17.12 (114) v Sandy Bay 12.11 (83) – Att: 2,793 at Queenborough Oval
- Clarence 16.13 (109) v Nth Hobart 10.12 (72) – Att: 2,042 at Bellerive Oval

=== Round 19 ===
(Saturday, 12 August 1972)

- Sandy Bay 15.16 (106) v Clarence 7.7 (49) – Att: 4,305 at North Hobart Oval
- New Norfolk 10.19 (79) v Hobart 10.13 (73) – Att: 1,922 at Boyer Oval
- Glenorchy 9.13 (67) v Nth Hobart 9.11 (65) – Att: 2,097 at KGV Football Park

=== Round 20 ===
(Saturday, 19 August 1972)

- Clarence 13.14 (92) v New Norfolk 6.9 (45) – Att: 4,333 at North Hobart Oval
- Sandy Bay 14.15 (99) v Glenorchy 12.14 (86) – Att: 3,668 at Queenborough Oval
- Hobart 24.13 (157) v Nth Hobart 10.18 (78) – Att: 2,016 at TCA Ground

=== First Semi Final ===
(Saturday, 26 August 1972)

- Hobart: 4.4 (28) | 7.11 (53) | 11.13 (79) | 13.16 (94)
- Clarence: 1.3 (9) | 3.5 (23) | 9.8 (62) | 14.8 (92)
- Attendance: 12,628 at North Hobart Oval

=== Second Semi Final ===
(Saturday, 2 September 1972)

- Sandy Bay: 5.4 (34) | 8.8 (56) | 14.14 (98) | 17.22 (124)
- New Norfolk: 4.2 (26) | 9.3 (57) | 13.5 (83) | 15.8 (98)
- Attendance: 10,466 at North Hobart Oval

=== Preliminary Final ===
(Saturday, 9 September 1972)

- New Norfolk: 2.7 (19) | 4.11 (35) | 9.13 (67) | 11.14 (80)
- Hobart: 4.3 (27) | 5.6 (36) | 7.12 (54) | 10.16 (76)
- Attendance: 10,993 at North Hobart Oval

=== Grand Final ===
(Saturday, 16 September 1972)

- Sandy Bay: 5.2 (32) | 9.5 (59) | 13.7 (85) | 18.9 (117)
- New Norfolk: 2.2 (14) | 3.7 (25) | 5.10 (40) | 10.14 (74)
- Attendance: 17,304 at North Hobart Oval

Source: All scores and statistics courtesy of the Hobart Mercury and Saturday Evening Mercury (SEM) publications.
