= 1975 Championship of Australia =

Winfield Cup - 1975 Champions of Australia Series

Tournament details
- City: Adelaide
- Dates: 11–13 October 1975
- Teams: 4
- Venue(s): 1

Final positions
- Champions: North Melbourne (1st title)
- Runners-up: Norwood
- Third place: West Perth
- Fourth place: Glenorchy

Tournament statistics
- Matches played: 4
- Attendance: 29,842 (7,461 per match)

The 1975 Championship of Australia was the 19th edition of the Championship of Australia, an ANFC-organised national club Australian rules football tournament between the champion clubs from the VFL, the SANFL, the WANFL and the Tasmanian State Premiership.

This was the last Championship of Australia title to be held before the competition was expanded the following year into the NFL Championship Series.

== Qualified Teams ==
Team	Nickname	League	Qualification	Participation (bold indicates winners)
North Melbourne	Kangaroos	VFL	Winners of the 1975 Victorian Football League	1st
Norwood	Redlegs	SANFL	Winners of the 1975 South Australian National Football League	3rd (Previous: **1888**, **1907**)
West Perth	Falcons	WANFL	Winners of the 1975 Western Australian National Football League	1st
Glenorchy	Magpies	TANFL	Winners of the 1975 Tasmanian State Premiership	1st

== Venue ==
Adelaide
Football Park
Capacity: **67,000**
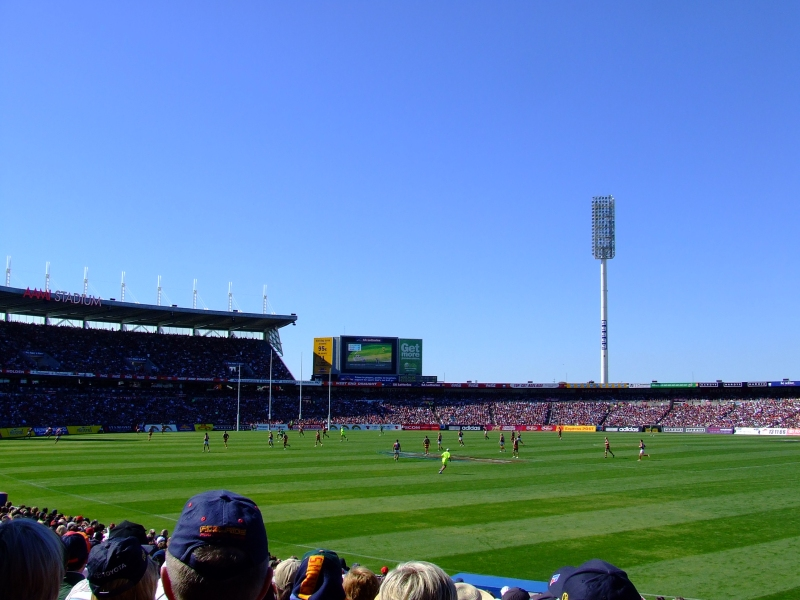

== Fixtures ==
=== Semi-finals ===
**SF #1** 11 October 1975	**North Melbourne**	**90-51**	**West Perth**	Football Park, Adelaide
	12.18 (90)		7.9 (51)	Attendance: 12,266

**SF #2** 11 October 1975	**Norwood**	**92-59**	**Glenorchy**	Football Park, Adelaide
	12.20 (92)		8.11 (59)	Attendance: 12,266

=== Third-place play-off ===
**Third Place** 13 October 1975	**West Perth**	**119-87**	**Glenorchy**	Football Park, Adelaide
	17.17 (119)		13.9 (87)	Attendance: 17,576

=== Championship of Australia final ===
Final 13 October 1975	**North Melbourne**	**117-41**	**Norwood**	Football Park, Adelaide
	4.3 (27); 9.8 (62); 15.13 (103); 17.15 (117)	Report	2.3 (15); 3.7 (25); 5.7 (37); 5.11 (41)	Attendance: 17,576; Umpires: Ross Capes
		**Goals**
	M Blight 9 R Smith 4 G Cowton, W Schimmelbusch 2		G Turbill, G Rosser, R Dillon, R Seekamp, J Wynne 1
