= 1975 TANFL season =

Australian rules football season

- Teams: Clarence Kangaroos; Glenorchy Magpies; Hobart Tigers; New Norfolk Eagles; North Hobart Demons; Sandy Bay Seagulls
- Premiers: Glenorchy
- Minor premiers: Clarence; 3rd minor premiership

Attendance
- Matches played: 61
- Total attendance: 177,622 (2,912 per match)

The 1975 Tasmanian Australian National Football League (TANFL) premiership season was an Australian rules football competition staged in Hobart, Tasmania over nineteen (19) roster rounds and four (4) finals series matches between 29 March and 20 September 1975.

A twentieth roster round scheduled for 30 August was abandoned due to inclement weather conditions and was never replayed as all positions on the ladder could not change regardless of results, the TFL executive also expressed the view that with most grounds in quagmire-like condition and being closed by their respective Councils, it would be a prudent move to cancel the round in order to freshen up the playing surface of North Hobart Oval for the following week's finals.

== Participating Clubs ==
- Clarence District Football Club
- Glenorchy District Football Club
- Hobart Football Club
- New Norfolk District Football Club
- North Hobart Football Club
- Sandy Bay Football Club

=== 1975 TANFL Club Coaches ===
- Trevor Sorrell (Clarence)
- Trevor Sprigg & Peter Hudson (Glenorchy)
- David Harris (Hobart)
- Darrel Baldock & Garth Smith (New Norfolk)
- John Devine (North Hobart)
- Rod Olsson (Sandy Bay)

=== TANFL Reserves Grand Final ===
- New Norfolk 13.27 (105) v Nth Hobart 12.17 (89) – North Hobart Oval

=== TANFL Under-19's Grand Final ===
- Clarence 10.13 (73) v Sandy Bay 7.13 (55) – North Hobart Oval

=== State Preliminary Final ===
(Saturday, 20 September 1975)

- Nth Launceston 18.20 (128) v Wynyard 4.15 (39) – Att: N/A at York Park

=== State Grand Final ===
(Saturday, 27 September 1975)

- Glenorchy: 4.2 (26) | 6.6 (42) | 15.12 (102) | 18.24 (132)
- Nth Launceston: 3.5 (23) | 10.8 (68) | 13.11 (89) | 16.12 (108)
- Attendance: 8,654 at North Hobart Oval

=== BP Knockout Cup Final ===
(Sunday, 10 August 1975)

- Glenorchy 15.12 (102) v Sandy Bay 13.15 (93) – North Hobart Oval

=== Intrastate Matches ===
Jubilee Shield (Saturday, 12 April 1975)

- TANFL 23.10 (148) v NWFU 18.15 (123) – Att: 2,588 at Devonport Oval

Jubilee Shield (Saturday, 10 May 1975)

- TANFL 25.24 (174) v NTFA 16.14 (110) – Att: 5,552 at North Hobart Oval

=== Interstate Matches ===
Interstate Match (Saturday, 17 May 1975)

- Queensland 16.29 (125) v Tasmania 16.7 (103) – Att: 13,000 at the Gabba, Brisbane

Interstate Match (Sunday, 25 May 1975)

- Tasmania 17.13 (115) v ACT 7.8 (50) – Att: 4,900 at Devonport Oval

Knockout Carnival (Saturday, 14 June 1975)

- South Australia 17.16 (118) v Tasmania 8.11 (59) – Att: 40,006 at VFL Park, Melbourne

Interstate Match (Saturday, 5 July 1975)

- Tasmania 22.19 (151) v New South Wales 7.7 (49) – Att: 4,827 at North Hobart Oval

=== Leading Goalkickers: TANFL ===
- Peter Hudson (Glenorchy) – 76

=== Medal Winners ===
- Trevor Sprigg (Glenorchy) – William Leitch Medal
- Robert Wylie (New Norfolk) – George Watt Medal (Reserves)
- Michael Seddon (Sandy Bay) – V.A Geard Medal (Under-19's)
- Malcolm Bugg (Hobart) – Weller Arnold Medal (Best TANFL player in Intrastate matches)

== 1975 TANFL Ladder ==
Pos	Team	Pld	W	L	D	PF	PA	PP	Pts
1	Clarence	19	14	5	0	1983	1701	116.6	56
2	Glenorchy	19	12	7	0	2029	1590	127.6	48
3	Hobart	19	11	8	0	1681	1675	100.4	44
4	Sandy Bay	19	10	9	0	1647	1556	105.8	40
5	North Hobart	19	8	11	0	1586	1851	85.7	32
6	New Norfolk	19	2	17	0	1511	2064	73.2	8

=== Round 1 ===
(Saturday, 29 March & Monday, 31 March 1975)

- Nth Hobart 15.16 (106) v New Norfolk 9.18 (72) – Att: 3,514 at North Hobart Oval
- Hobart 13.12 (90) v Sandy Bay 7.14 (56) – Att: 2,167 at Queenborough Oval
- Clarence 21.13 (139) v Glenorchy 11.18 (84) – Att: 3,883 at North Hobart Oval (Monday)

=== Round 2 ===
(Saturday, 5 April 1975)

- Hobart 17.15 (117) v Glenorchy 11.20 (86) – Att: 3,252 at North Hobart Oval
- Nth Hobart 16.16 (112) v Clarence 13.22 (100) – Att: 3,137 at Bellerive Oval
- New Norfolk 18.18 (126) v Sandy Bay 15.22 (112) – Att: 1,570 at Boyer Oval

=== Round 3 ===
(Saturday, 12 April 1975)

- Hobart 18.15 (123) v Nth Hobart 12.7 (79) – Att: 3,147 at North Hobart Oval
- Clarence 14.23 (107) v New Norfolk 15.7 (97) – Att: 2,842 at Boyer Oval
- Glenorchy 11.15 (81) v Sandy Bay 10.13 (73) – Att: 2,321 at KGV Football Park

=== Round 4 ===
(Saturday, 19 April 1975)

- Glenorchy 20.16 (136) v New Norfolk 6.11 (47) – Att: 2,716 at North Hobart Oval
- Clarence 18.18 (126) v Hobart 14.15 (99) – Att: 2,273 at TCA Ground
- Nth Hobart 12.9 (81) v Sandy Bay 8.18 (66) – Att: 2,159 at Queenborough Oval

=== Round 5 ===
(Friday, 25 April & Saturday, 26 April 1975)

- Clarence 19.12 (126) v Sandy Bay 10.8 (68) – Att: 3,868 at North Hobart Oval (Friday)
- Nth Hobart 19.14 (128) v Glenorchy 13.15 (93) – Att: 4,344 at North Hobart Oval
- Hobart 14.14 (98) v New Norfolk 9.18 (72) – Att: 1,772 at Boyer Oval

=== Round 6 ===
(Saturday, 3 May 1975)

- Sandy Bay 9.26 (80) v Hobart 10.12 (72) – Att: 2,982 at North Hobart Oval
- Glenorchy 18.10 (118) v Clarence 16.20 (116) – Att: 2,911 at Bellerive Oval
- Nth Hobart 21.15 (141) v New Norfolk 17.10 (112) – Att: 1,953 at Boyer Oval

=== Round 7 ===
(Saturday, 17 May 1975)

- Clarence 19.21 (135) v Nth Hobart 12.10 (82) – Att: 2,631 at North Hobart Oval
- Hobart 12.9 (81) v Glenorchy 10.19 (79) – Att: 1,998 at KGV Football Park
- Sandy Bay 15.12 (102) v New Norfolk 12.11 (83) – Att: 1,433 at Queenborough Oval

=== Round 8 ===
(Saturday, 24 May & Sunday, 25 May 1975)

- Clarence 11.20 (86) v New Norfolk 11.14 (80) – Att: 2,181 at North Hobart Oval
- Glenorchy 10.19 (79) v Sandy Bay 7.13 (55) – Att: 2,589 at Queenborough Oval
- Hobart 15.13 (103) v Nth Hobart 6.11 (47) – Att: 1,995 at TCA Ground (Sunday)

=== Round 9 ===
(Saturday, 31 May 1975)

- Sandy Bay 13.15 (93) v Nth Hobart 10.12 (72) – Att: 3,128 at North Hobart Oval
- Clarence 22.16 (148) v Hobart 12.21 (93) – Att: 2,775 at Bellerive Oval
- Glenorchy 15.11 (101) v New Norfolk 11.14 (80) – Att: 1,593 at Boyer Oval

=== Round 10 ===
(Saturday, 7 June 1975)

- Hobart 13.15 (93) v New Norfolk 12.14 (86) – Att: 1,757 at North Hobart Oval
- Clarence 15.9 (99) v Sandy Bay 13.6 (84) – Att: 2,644 at Queenborough Oval
- Glenorchy 17.15 (117) v Nth Hobart 9.7 (61) – Att: 3,000 at KGV Football Park

=== Round 11 ===
(Saturday, 14 June & Monday, 16 June 1975)

- Glenorchy 27.13 (175) v Clarence 6.10 (46) – Att: 3,246 at North Hobart Oval
- Sandy Bay 14.17 (101) v Hobart 8.9 (57) – Att: 1,521 at TCA Ground
- New Norfolk 13.18 (96) v Nth Hobart 9.12 (66) – Att: 3,887 at North Hobart Oval (Monday)

=== Round 12 ===
(Saturday, 21 June 1975)

- Sandy Bay 19.20 (134) v New Norfolk 8.13 (61) – Att: 1,919 at North Hobart Oval
- Glenorchy 20.15 (135) v Hobart 18.10 (118) – Att: 3,178 at TCA Ground *
- Nth Hobart 13.15 (93) v Clarence 11.14 (80) – Att: 2,453 at Bellerive Oval

Note: Peter Hudson returns to TANFL football for the first time since 1966 and kicks 8.4 on his return.

=== Round 13 ===
(Saturday, 28 June & Sunday, 29 June 1975)

- Nth Hobart 14.9 (93) v Hobart 10.11 (71) – Att: 2,168 at North Hobart Oval
- Clarence 15.13 (103) v New Norfolk 14.9 (93) – Att: 2,482 at Bellerive Oval
- Glenorchy 24.15 (159) v Sandy Bay 9.5 (59) – Att: 6,107 at KGV Football Park (Sunday)

=== Round 14 ===
(Saturday, 12 July 1975)

- Clarence 13.7 (85) v Hobart 10.13 (73) – Att: 2,034 at North Hobart Oval
- Sandy Bay 15.8 (98) v Nth Hobart 7.6 (48) – Att: 2,195 at Queenborough Oval
- Glenorchy 22.11 (143) v New Norfolk 8.13 (61) – Att: 2,073 at KGV Football Park

=== Round 15 ===
(Saturday, 19 July 1975)

- Glenorchy 13.7 (85) v Nth Hobart 7.8 (50) – Att: 4,379 at North Hobart Oval
- Sandy Bay 11.9 (75) v Clarence 6.13 (49) – Att: 2,003 at Bellerive Oval
- Hobart 10.14 (74) v New Norfolk 10.6 (66) – Att: 1,032 at Boyer Oval

=== Round 16 ===
(Saturday, 26 July 1975)

- Hobart 9.9 (63) v Sandy Bay 5.5 (35) – Att: 2,152 at North Hobart Oval
- Nth Hobart 12.8 (80) v New Norfolk 7.16 (58) – Att: 897 at Boyer Oval
- Clarence 12.13 (85) v Glenorchy 12.7 (79) – Att: 2,830 at KGV Football Park

=== Round 17 ===
(Saturday, 9 August 1975)

- Clarence 15.17 (107) v Nth Hobart 10.16 (76) – Att: 2,897 at North Hobart Oval
- Hobart 19.12 (126) v Glenorchy 13.21 (99) – Att: 2,161 at TCA Ground
- Sandy Bay 17.18 (120) v New Norfolk 10.11 (71) – Att: 1,195 at Queenborough Oval

=== Round 18 ===
(Saturday, 16 August 1975)

- Sandy Bay 14.14 (98) v Glenorchy 9.17 (71) – Att: 3,089 at North Hobart Oval
- Clarence 21.19 (145) v New Norfolk 14.10 (94) – Att: 898 at Boyer Oval
- Hobart 15.16 (106) v Nth Hobart 14.17 (101) – Att: 1,513 at TCA Ground

=== Round 19 ===
(Saturday, 23 August 1975)

- Sandy Bay 20.17 (137) v Nth Hobart 8.14 (62) – Att: 2,711 at North Hobart Oval
- Clarence 15.11 (101) v Hobart 3.6 (24) – Att: 2,360 at Bellerive Oval
- Glenorchy 15.20 (110) v New Norfolk 6.14 (50) – Att: 1,739 at KGV Football Park

=== Round 20 ===
(Saturday, 30 August 1975)

- Sandy Bay v Clarence – at North Hobart Oval (Cancelled)
- Glenorchy v Nth Hobart – at KGV Football Park (Cancelled)
- Hobart v New Norfolk – at TCA Ground (Cancelled)

Note: This round was abandoned due to inclement weather and unfit playing surfaces or Council enforced closures at all grounds.

=== First Semi Final ===
(Saturday, 6 September 1975)

- Sandy Bay: 4.4 (28) | 8.7 (55) | 12.12 (84) | 15.14 (104)
- Hobart: 4.2 (26) | 8.3 (51) | 10.4 (64) | 14.4 (88)
- Attendance: 4,564 at North Hobart Oval

=== Second Semi Final ===
(Sunday, 7 September 1975)

- Glenorchy: 5.3 (33) | 9.7 (61) | 16.8 (104) | 20.12 (132)
- Clarence: 4.3 (27) | 7.5 (47) | 10.6 (66) | 12.6 (78)
- Attendance: 6,385 at North Hobart Oval

=== Preliminary Final ===
(Saturday, 13 September 1975)

- Sandy Bay: 1.9 (15) | 3.10 (28) | 8.16 (64) | 10.19 (79)
- Clarence: 2.3 (15) | 3.6 (24) | 6.8 (44) | 8.9 (57)
- Attendance: 7,508 at North Hobart Oval

=== Grand Final ===
(Saturday, 20 September 1975)

- Glenorchy: 2.3 (15) | 5.11 (41) | 12.15 (87) | 15.16 (106)
- Sandy Bay: 3.3 (21) | 4.5 (29) | 7.6 (48) | 10.7 (67)
- Attendance: 15,449 at North Hobart Oval

Source: All scores and statistics courtesy of the Hobart Mercury and Saturday Evening Mercury (SEM) publications.
