= William Picken =

William Picken may refer to:

- Billy Picken (1956–2022), Australian rules footballer
- Bill Picken (born 1950), Australian horse racing executive
- William Picken Alexander (1905–1993), Scottish educator and administrator
- William Picken Carr, politician in colonial Victoria, Australia

== See also ==
- William Pickens
