= Terry Mayne =

Australian rules footballer

Personal information
- Full name: Terrence Neville Mayne
- Born: 24 December 1950
- Died: 11 April 1983 (aged 32)
- Original team: Clarence
- Height: 180 cm (5 ft 11 in)
- Weight: 79 kg (174 lb)
- Position: Forward

Playing career^{1}
Years	Club	Games (Goals)
1972–73	Geelong	19 (20)
- ^{1} Playing statistics correct to the end of 1973.

Terrence Neville Mayne (24 December 1950 – 11 April 1983) was an Australian rules footballer who played for Geelong in the Victorian Football League (VFL) during the early 1970s.

At the age of just 19, Mayne became a Clarence premiership player when he kicked ten goals against New Norfolk in the 1970 TANFL Grand Final. His tally helped Clarence win by 55 points and equaled the league's Grand Final record, which Alan Rait set in 1932. The following season, Mayne was the TANFL leading goal-kicker with 74 goals and was picked up by Geelong. His two years on the mainland weren't overly successful but he did kick 18 goals in the 1973 VFL season.

Mayne died as a result of head injuries received in an altercation with a motorist in the carpark at Bellerive Quay in April 1983 at just 32 years of age.
