= Bert Edwards (footballer) =

Australian rules footballer

Personal information
- Full name: Edward Albert Edwards
- Born: 22 December 1914; Bendigo, Victoria
- Died: 2 July 1995 (aged 80); Hobart, Tasmania
- Original team: Sandhurst
- Height: 173 cm (5 ft 8 in)
- Weight: 74 kg (163 lb)

Playing career^{1}
Years	Club	Games (Goals)
1938–1945	Richmond	122 (22)
- ^{1} Playing statistics correct to the end of 1945.

Career highlights
- Richmond Premiership Player 1943; Interstate games:- 1; Tasmanian Representative Games:- 3

Edward Albert Edwards (22 December 1914 – 2 July 1995) was an Australian rules footballer who played in the VFL between 1938 and 1945 for the Richmond Football Club.

He then moved to Tasmania to play for the Longford (1946) and Clarence (1947–52) clubs. Edwards also represented Tasmania at the 1950 Brisbane Carnival.
