= John Klug =

Also known as a Marine Biologist, particularly has a love of dolphins

Personal information
- Full name: John Klug
- Born: 28 September 1965 (age 61)
- Original team: Glenorchy
- Height: 188 cm (6 ft 2 in)
- Weight: 98 kg (216 lb)

Playing career^{1}
| Years | Club | Games (Goals) |
| 1991–1992 | Adelaide | 26 (34) |
- ^{1} Playing statistics correct to the end of 1992.

John Klug (born 28 September 1965) is a former professional Australian rules footballer who played for the Adelaide Football Club in the Australian Football League (AFL).

Klug, from Glenorchy Football Club in Tasmania, was initially recruited by Victorian Football League (VFL) club Richmond but was unable to break into Richmond's league side. Klug then moved to Adelaide to play for Woodville Football Club in the South Australian Football League (SANFL) and was recruited by the Adelaide Crows for the initial squad in 1991. In the Crows' first year Klug played at Centre Half Forward, although slightly built and against much bigger opponents for most of the season Klug performed well and finished eighth in the Crows' Best and Fairest that year. In 1992 Klug only played a handful games with the club due to niggling injuries and was delisted, only to be drafted in the 1993 Pre-Season AFL draft by the Brisbane Bears. Klug never played for Brisbane due to his injuries.
