= Scott Sutcliffe =

Australian rules footballer

Personal information
- Full name: Scott Sutcliffe
- Born: 10 February 1963 (age 63)
- Original team: Clarence
- Height: 185 cm (6 ft 1 in)
- Weight: 79 kg (174 lb)

Playing career^{1}
Years	Club	Games (Goals)
1982–85	Melbourne	7 (2)
1986	Richmond	2 (0)
Total		9 (2)
- ^{1} Playing statistics correct to the end of 1986.

Scott Sutcliffe (born 10 February 1963) is a former Australian rules footballer who played with Melbourne and Richmond in the Victorian Football League (VFL).
