= Matthew Mansfield =

Australian rules footballer (born 1969)

Personal information
- Full name: Matthew Mansfield
- Born: 24 June 1969 (age 57)
- Original team: Glenorchy Football Club
- Draft: No. 19, 1986 national draft
- Height: 188 cm (6 ft 2 in)
- Weight: 79 kg (174 lb)

Playing career^{1}
| Years | Club | Games (Goals) |
| 1991–1993 | Footscray | 32 (5) |
- ^{1} Playing statistics correct to the end of 1993.

Matthew Mansfield (born 24 June 1969) is a former Australian rules footballer who played for the Footscray (now Western Bulldogs) Football Club in the Australian Football League. Originally recruited from the Glenorchy Football Club, Mansfield made his debut in the 1991 AFL season and played 32 games and kicked 5 goals until the 1993 AFL season. Mansfield played in 3 finals in the 1992 AFL season.
