= Ben Beams =

Australian rules footballer

Personal information
- Full name: Benjamin Ricki Beams
- Born: 17 August 1978 (age 48); Launceston
- Original team: Glenorchy/Tassie Mariners
- Draft: 33rd overall, 1997 Rookie draft (Melbourne)
- Height: 183 cm (6 ft 0 in)
- Weight: 76 kg (168 lb)
- Position: Small forward

Playing career^{1}
Years	Club	Games (Goals)
1997–2001	Melbourne	23 (17)

Coaching career
Years	Club	Games (W–L–D)
2008	MFNC (O&MFNL)	
2009–2011	TUFC (OSFA)	
2012–2013	GDFC (TSL)	
2014–current	TUFC (OSFA)	
- ^{1} Playing statistics correct to the end of 2001.

Career highlights
- Played in the 2000 AFL Grand Final Melbourne v Essendon

Ben Beams (born 17 August 1978) is an Australian rules footballer who played for the Melbourne Football Club in the Australian Football League (AFL) between 1999 and 2001 and the Tasmanian Devils Football club in the Victorian Football League (VFL) from 2002 until 2006.

== AFL career ==
Recruited from Glenorchy, Tasmania he made his AFL debut in Round 5 of the 1999 season against Port Adelaide, and played 11 games for 9 goals in his debut year. His returns diminished in the following years and he appeared just 7 times in 2000.

=== 2000 Grand Final appearance ===
He did, however, make an appearance in the Melbourne Grand Final team of that year when Cameron Bruce was forced to withdraw on the day of the game due to injury. Beams barely left the bench all day and failed to register a possession. Melbourne lost the Grand Final against Essendon by 60 points.

=== Delisting ===
Beams appeared in the first two games of the 2001 season, but found himself a casualty of the Demons alarming drop in form which took them from 2nd in 2000 to 11th a year later. He appeared a total of five times during the year for four goals and was subsequently delisted at the end of the season.

== Post-AFL career ==
Beams then moved to the Victorian Football League to play for the Tasmanian Devils, back in his home state. He later became their captain and remained with the team as of 2006. Ben quit the Devils and VFL football in 2007 and was appointed coach of the Myrtleford Football Club in 2008. In 2009 he underwent knee surgery and coached University in the Old Scholars Football AssociationLeague.

In 2011 he was announced the coach of the Glenorchy Football Club for the 2012 Tasmanian State League season. He replaced Byron Howard who left the job. He coached GDFC 2012 -2013 Season and in 2014 returned as senior coach to TUFC (Old Scholars Football Association) and has remained senior coach for the past 5 Seasons, during which time he coached TUFC to a premiership in 2016.

He was inducted into the Tasmanian AFL Hall of Fame 2015 as inductee #297.
