= Peter Hudson =

Australian rules footballer (born 1946)

Personal information
- Full name: Peter John Hudson AM
- Born: 19 February 1946 (age 80); New Norfolk, Tasmania
- Debut: Round 2, 22 April 1967, Hawthorn vs. Carlton, at Princes Park
- Height: 188 cm (6 ft 2 in)
- Weight: 92 kg (203 lb)

Playing career^{1}
Years	Club	Games (Goals)
1963–66	New Norfolk	78 (378)
1967–74; 1977	Hawthorn	129 (727)
1975–76; 1978–82	Glenorchy	81 (616)
Total		288 (1721)

Representative team honours
Years	Team	Games (Goals)
	Tasmania	19 (92)
	Victoria	8 (43)
	Tasmanian FL	26 (153)
Total		53 (288)

Coaching career
Years	Club	Games (W–L–D)
1975–76; 1981	Glenorchy	63 (40–23–0)
1986–87	Hobart	39 (24–15–0)
Total		102 (64–38–0)
- ^{1} Playing statistics correct to the end of 1981.

Career highlights
- VFL Premiership player: 1971; 4× Coleman Medal: 1968, 1970, 1971, 1977; 2× Hawthorn best and fairest: 1968, 1970; 6× Hawthorn leading goalkicker: 1967–1971, 1977; 2× All-Australian team: 1966, 1969; TANFL Premiership player: 1975; 2× William Leitch Medal: 1978, 1979; New Norfolk best and fairest: 1965; 3× Glenorchy best and fairest: 1976, 1978, 1979; 8× TFL leading goalkicker: 1963–1966, 1975, 1976, 1978, 1979; 4× New Norfolk leading goalkicker: 1963–1966; 4× Glenorchy leading goalkicker: 1975, 1976, 1978, 1979; Australian Football Hall of Fame – Legend status; Tasmanian Football Hall of Fame Icon; Hawthorn Hall of Fame – Legend status; Hawthorn Team of the Century; Tasmanian Team of the Century; Most goals in a VFL/AFL Season (tied) 1971

Peter John Hudson AM (born 19 February 1946) is a former Australian rules footballer who played for the Hawthorn Football Club in the Victorian Football League (VFL) and for the New Norfolk Football Club and Glenorchy Football Club in the Tasmanian Australian National Football League (TANFL).

A legend in the Australian Football Hall of Fame, Hudson is considered one of the greatest full-forwards in the game's history. He holds the highest career goal-per-game average (5.64) in VFL/AFL history, and he is only one of two VFL/AFL footballers (the other being Essendon's John Coleman) to average more than five goals per game. He was the first VFL/AFL player to kick 100 or more goals in a season five times, equalled Bob Pratt's VFL/AFL record of 150 goals in a season in 1971 and, after the AFL decided to retrospectively recognise the leading VFL goalkickers during the home-and-away season back to 1955, won the Coleman Medal four times.

Hudson was a superb reader of the play and knew how to use his body well in one-on-one contests. He had a safe pair of hands and although he was known for using the flat punt when kicking for goal, he was usually very accurate.

Over his career, he kicked 1721 goals in 288 premiership games between 1963 and 1979, and in 1981. His final match was in the 1981 TANFL Preliminary Final for Glenorchy, where Hudson, who had made a brief comeback with two rounds remaining due to Glenorchy having a string of injuries, kicked 30 goals in three matches, including six in his team's Preliminary Final loss to New Norfolk. Hudson was kept goalless just four times during his career in premiership matches by Richmond's Barry Richardson in Round 7 of 1969, Collingwood's Ian Cooper in Round 2 of 1974, Carlton's Rod Austin in Round 14 of 1977, and in the TANFL, Bruce Greenhill of Sandy Bay in 1978.

Some sources list Hudson as playing 92 games and kicking 460 goals for New Norfolk, and playing 93 games and kicking 687 goals for Glenorchy, for a TANFL total of 185 games and 1147 goals, and a career total of 314 games and 1874 goals. These discrepancies arise from the TANFL including games played and goals scored in intrastate matches representing the TANFL in TANFL players' premiership career statistics at that time, a ruling that was later rescinded.

Hudson also kicked 135 goals - 92 for Tasmania and 43 for Victoria - in 27 interstate football matches - 19 for Tasmania and eight for Victoria - and kicked 153 goals in 26 intrastate matches for the TANFL, as well as 182 goals in 33 night series matches - 63 goals for Hawthorn in 14 matches, ten goals for Tasmania in two matches, and 109 goals for Glenorchy in 17 matches. Hudson also played four International Rules matches on the 1968 Australian World Football Tour.

If these are considered, Hudson played a total of 378 career senior games and kicked 2191 senior career goals – an average of 5.8 goals a game over his entire career.

Hudson also kicked 120 goals in 19 matches for Upper Derwent (where his father Robert was the playing coach) in the Southern DFL in 1962, and kicked 10 goals in an interleague match for the Southern DFL: if this is also considered, then Hudson played a total of 398 overall career games and kicked 2321 overall career goals.

Hudson also experienced success as a coach during and after his playing days, leading Glenorchy to a TANFL premiership as playing coach and later coaching Hobart to successive finals appearances. He also was CEO at St Kilda and Hawthorn during the 1990s.

== VFL career ==
Hudson's arrival in the VFL came at a period when full-forwards were beginning to experience a resurgence, most notable being Doug Wade of Geelong and Peter McKenna of Collingwood. After sitting out the first game of 1967, as he didn't meet the league's residential requirements, Hudson's first game was against Carlton. Lining up against rugged full-back Wes Lofts, he managed to kick four goals.

In 1971, he equalled Bob Pratt's record of 150 goals in a season after kicking three goals in Hawthorn's winning Grand Final side. Hudson kicked into the man-on-the-mark Barry Lawrence (St Kilda) in one of his attempts to break the record during the grand final.

In the first round of 1972, he seriously injured his knee just before half time. He had already kicked 8 goals and had just taken a mark within distance when he fell awkwardly. It was thought that his career had finished.

On 25 August 1973 he returned from Tasmania to kick eight goals against Collingwood at VFL Park. After playing Rounds 1 and 2 in 1974, he again injured his knee and returned to Tasmania. Later that year, after hurting his knee playing netball, he decided to have knee surgery in the summer. He did not play another VFL game until lured back for the 1977 season, during which he kicked 110 goals for the season.

== Post-playing career ==
Hudson supported the planned merger between Hawthorn and Melbourne in 1996.

== VFL statistics ==
Legend
G	Goals	K	Kicks	D	Disposals
B	Behinds	H	Handballs	M	Marks
#	Played in that season's premiership team	†	Led the league for the season

VFL playing statistics
Season	Team	No.	Games	Totals						Averages (per game)						Votes
Season	Team	No.	Games	G	B	K	H	D	M	G	B	K	H	D	M	Votes
1967	Hawthorn	26	17	57	55^{†}	179	29	208	90	3.4	3.2^{†}	10.5	1.7	12.2	5.3	3
1968	Hawthorn	26	19	125^{†}	62^{†}	274	31	305	113	6.6^{†}	3.3^{†}	14.4	1.6	16.1	5.9	16
1969	Hawthorn	26	19	120	40	217	16	233	111	6.3^{†}	2.1	11.4	0.8	12.3	5.8	8
1970	Hawthorn	26	22	146^{†}	44	282	19	301	140	6.6^{†}	2.0	12.8	0.9	13.7	6.4	14
1971^{#}	Hawthorn	26	24	150^{†}	72	346	41	387	180	6.3^{†}	3.0	14.4	1.7	16.1	7.5	18
1972	Hawthorn	26	1	8	1	12	1	13	9	8.0	1.0	12.0	1.0	13.0	9.0	1
1973	Hawthorn	26	1	8	3	15	0	15	10	8.0	3.0	15.0	0.0	15.0	10.0	2
1974	Hawthorn	26	2	3	3	10	7	17	6	1.5	1.5	5.0	3.5	8.5	3.0	0
1977	Hawthorn	1	24	110^{†}	50	243	32	275	123	4.6^{†}	2.3	10.1	1.3	11.5	5.1	16
Career			129	727	330	1578	176	1754	782	5.6	2.6	12.2	1.4	13.6	6.1	78

== Honours and achievements ==
Team

- VFL Premiership player (Hawthorn): 1971
- Minor premiership (Hawthorn): 1971
- TANFL Premiership player (Glenorchy): 1975

Individual

- 4× Coleman Medal: 1968, 1970, 1971, 1977
- 2× J.J. Dennis Memorial Trophy: 1968, 1970
- 6× Hawthorn leading goalkicker: 1967, 1968, 1969, 1970, 1971, 1977
- 2× All-Australian team: 1966, 1969
- 2× William Leitch Medal: 1978, 1979
- New Norfolk best and fairest: 1965
- 3× Glenorchy best and fairest: 1976, 1978, 1979
- 8× TFL leading goalkicker: 1963, 1964, 1965, 1966, 1975, 1976, 1978, 1979
- 4× New Norfolk leading goalkicker: 1963, 1964, 1965, 1966
- 4× Glenorchy leading goalkicker: 1975, 1976, 1978, 1979
- Australian Football Hall of Fame – Legend status
- Tasmanian Football Hall of Fame Icon
- Hawthorn Hall of Fame – Legend status
- Hawthorn Team of the Century
- Tasmanian Team of the Century
- Hawthorn life member

== Post-VFL career ==
Hudson coached and played for Glenorchy Football Club in the TFL in 1975 and 1976, taking them to a premiership in his first year. Following his second return from the VFL, in 1978 he once again played for Glenorchy, kicking 153 goals and winning the highest individual honour in the TFL, the William Leitch Medal. In the next season he again topped the goalkicking with 179 goals, winning his second William Leitch medal. He retired as a player at the end of the season. He coached Hobart in the TFL in 1986–1987 for consecutive unsuccessful finals campaigns.

In 1979, he was made a Member of the Order of Australia (AM) in the Australia Day Honours, for services to Australian football.

He was inducted into the Australian Football Hall of Fame in 1996 and elevated to "Legend" status in 1999. His citation reads: "A freakish full-forward who just kept accumulating goals. Made brilliant use of the body, was deadly accurate and had an amazing ability to read the play. Holds the best goals per game average (5.59) in VFL/AFL history and in 1971 matched Bob Pratt's record for most goals in a season with 150."

Hudson is well respected for his business acumen. Since retirement he has had a stint as the Chief Executive Officer at Hawthorn and St Kilda. Currently he is a senior executive of insurance giant Bupa.

Hudson was inducted into the Sport Australia Hall of Fame in 2001.

Hudson is depicted in a Tasmanian state guernsey taking a mark against South Australia in Jamie Cooper's painting The Game That Made Australia, commissioned by the AFL in 2008 to celebrate the 150th anniversary of the sport.

In 2010, Hudson became the eleventh player to feature in a Toyota Memorable Moments advertisement with Stephen Curry and Dave Lawson, comically re-enacting his unsuccessful attempt to break Bob Pratt's season goalkicking record in the 1971 VFL Grand Final.

== Family ==
His son Paul also played for the Hawthorn Football Club, Western Bulldogs and Richmond Football Club, and nephew Simon Minton-Connell also played AFL football for the Carlton Football Club, Sydney Swans, Hawthorn Football Club and Western Bulldogs.

== See also ==
- List of Australian rules football families
