= John Chick (footballer) =

Australian rules footballer and coach

Personal information
- Born: 25 August 1932
- Died: 17 March 2013 (aged 80); Tasmania
- Original team: New Town
- Debut: Round 1, 1952, Carlton vs. North Melbourne, at Arden Street
- Height: 175 cm (5 ft 9 in)
- Weight: 72 kg (159 lb)

Playing career^{1}
Years	Club	Games (Goals)
1952–1960	Carlton	119 (29)
- ^{1} Playing statistics correct to the end of 1960.

John Chick (25 August 1932 – 17 March 2013) was an Australian rules footballer who played with Carlton in the VFL during the 1950s.

Chick began and ended his career in Tasmania, but in between, he spent nine VFL seasons at Carlton. A pacy wingman, he joined Carlton from New Town, where he had played in their 1951 TANFL premiership side.

He was vice captain of Carlton in his last two seasons and represented Victoria at the 1956 Perth Carnival, where his performances earned him selection in the All-Australian team.

After leaving Carlton, he returned to his old club, now renamed Glenorchy, and was appointed captain-coach. He steered them to the 1961 Grand Final, but they could not win the premiership. He was later named on the interchange bench in the club's official 'Team of the Century'.

John Chick was inducted into the Tasmanian Football Hall of Fame in 2005.
