= Half-back line =

Positions in Australian-rules football

In the sport of Australian rules football, the half-back line refers to the positions of the 3 players on the field that occupy the centre half-back and left and right half-back flank positions.

Australian rules football positions
B:	back pocket	full-back	back pocket
HB:	half-back flank	centre half-back	half-back flank
C:	wing	centre	wing
HF:	half-forward flank	centre half-forward	half-forward flank
F:	forward pocket	full-forward	forward pocket
Foll:	ruckman	ruck rover	rover
Int:	interchange bench	interchange bench	interchange bench
Int:	interchange bench		
Coach:	coach		

== Centre half-back ==
The role of the centre half-back is similar to that of a defensive midfielder in association football. As the first line of defence, the centre half-back must aim to break down opposition attacks before they can get into a scoring position. Given that a centre half-back's opponent is usually the centre half-forward, the role is regarded as a key position in the team, and is usually reserved for tall and well-built players.

As one of the team's leaders, centre half-backs must be able to read the play and have good communication skills. Although their first responsibility is to defend, the great centre half-backs have proven to be equally creative in attack as well as reliable in defence.

Notable centre half-backs from over the years include:

- Albert Chadwick (Melbourne and Hawthorn, 1920–1929)
- Walter "Wacka" Scott (Norwood, 1920–1932), Magarey Medallist 1921, 1924, 1930
- Albert "Leeter" Collier (Collingwood and Fitzroy, 1925–1941), Brownlow Medallist 1929
- Reg Hickey (Geelong, 1926–1940)
- Denis Cordner (Melbourne, 1943–1956)
- Ron Clegg (South Melbourne, 1949–1960), Brownlow medallist 1949
- Ian "Bluey" Shelton (Essendon, 1959–1965)
- Peter Knights (Hawthorn, 1969–1985)
- Bill Picken (Collingwood and Sydney, 1974–1986)
- Jim Jess (Richmond, 1976–1988)
- Ross Glendinning (North Melbourne and West Coast, 1978–1988), Brownlow medallist 1983
- Paul Roos (Fitzroy and Sydney, 1982–1998)
- Glen Jakovich (West Coast, 1991–2004)

== Half-back flank ==
The half-back flank was traditionally a defensive position, where reliability and toughness were more important than attacking flair. In the modern game, reliability and toughness must now be combined with the ability to run and carry the ball as well as take on the opposition in a counter-attacking style.

Notable half-back flankers over the years in Australian football include:

- Alec Epis (Essendon, 1958–1968)
- Barry Davis (Essendon and North Melbourne, 1961–1975)
- John Rantall (South Melbourne, North Melbourne and Fitzroy, 1963–1980)
- Ian Bremner (Collingwood and Hawthorn, 1966–1976)
- Bruce Doull (Carlton, 1969–1986), Norm Smith Medallist 1981; Named Half-back flank in AFL Team of the Century (1996)
- Stephen Wallis (Footscray, 1983–1996)
- Ken Hinkley (Fitzroy and Geelong, 1987–1995)
- Guy McKenna (West Coast, 1988–2000)
- Andrew McKay
- Rohan Smith
- Andrew McLeod
- Nigel Smart
- Luke Hodge
- Brendon Goddard
- Corey Enright
- Shannon Hurn
- Beau Waters
- Adam Saad
- Bachar Houli
- Christian Salem
- Jack Sinclair
- Lachie Whitfield

== Bibliography ==
- Pascoe, Robert (1995). The winter game : the complete history of Australian football. Port Melbourne: The Text Publishing Company. ISBN 0-85561-644-X.
