= John Richmond (Australian footballer) =

Australian rules footballer

Personal information
- Full name: John Richmond
- Born: 23 February 1943 (age 83)
- Original team: Murrumbeena
- Height: 185 cm (6 ft 1 in)
- Weight: 84 kg (185 lb)

Playing career^{1}
| Years | Club | Games (Goals) |
| 1961–64 | Richmond | 18 (16) |
- ^{1} Playing statistics correct to the end of 1964.

John Richmond (born 23 February 1943) is a former Australian rules footballer who played for Richmond in the Victorian Football League (VFL) during the early 1960s.

Richmond was recruited from Murrumbeena and could only manage four appearances in his first two league seasons. He played 13 games with Richmond in 1964 and kicked 14 goals.

A ruck rover, he could also play as a centre half forward and after leaving Richmond spent some time at Clarence. He won the William Leitch Medal in 1967 and represented Tasmania in the 1969 Adelaide Carnival.
