= Andrew Vanderfeen =

Australian rules footballer

Andrew Wilfred Vanderfeen (born 10 September 1955) is a former Australian rules footballer who was inducted into the Tasmanian Football Hall of Fame in 2015.

Vanderfeen played 127 games for the Ulverstone Football Club and 98 games for the Clarence Football Club.

In 1979 Vanderfeen signed with South Fremantle but only played three games in the West Australian Football League before returning to Tasmania.
