= Robbie Dykes =

Australian rules football player and coach

Robert "Robbie" Dykes is a former Australian rules football player and coach. He played for Glenorchy and New Norfolk in the Tasmanian Australian National Football League.

Dykes made his debut for Glenorchy in 1970 at the age of 16. He won a premiership in 1975, and played in twelve consecutive grand finals from 1975 to 1986. He played for New Norfolk as a captain-coach from 1981 to 1983, winning the premiership in 1982, before returning to Glenorchy and winning further premierships with them in 1985 and 1986.

Dykes won the William Leitch Medal for the league's best and fairest in 1981, as well as the Glenorchy best and fairest in 1985. He was named on the half-back flank in both Glenorchy's Team of the Century and New Norfolk's Best Team of 1947–2001. Dykes was inducted into the Tasmanian Football Hall of Fame in 2008.

Dykes' father Jimmy Dykes was a Scottish international soccer player.
