= Paul Courto =

Australian rules footballer (1957–2026)

Paul Leo Courto (1957 – 31 May 2026) was an Australian rules footballer who played for Hobart in the Tasmanian Australian National Football League.

Courto played at full forward and was the league's leading goalkicker for the 1980 season. He was also the leading goalkicker in the Winfield Statewide Cup. Courto became the first player from the Hobart Football Club to record more than 100 goals in a season (despite the fact that it was recorded in two separate TANFL-sanctioned competitions in the same season) finishing up with 121 goals in 1980. He was also a spectacular marker.

Courto retired from the game after the 1982 TANFL Season at only 23 years old. He was named at full forward in Hobart's "Official Best Team 1947 to 2002".

Courto died on 31 May 2026.
