= Bill Picken =

Australian horse racing executive

William Andrew Picken OAM (born 5 May 1950) is an Australian horse racing executive. He served as chairman of the Sydney Turf Club (STC) from 2008 until its merger in 2010 with the Australian Jockey Club (AJC).

== Education ==
Picken attended Newington College (1958–1967), commencing as a preparatory school student in Wyvern House.

== Racing career ==
He joined the STC in 1988. He was elected to the board in 1998 and has served as Honorary Treasurer from 2003 to 2004 and Vice Chairman from 2005 to 2008. In December 2008 he was elected Chairman. Picken has a long association with the racing industry and has successfully raced and bred horses. He was also member of the AJC and is a Councillor of the Royal Agricultural Society of New South Wales (RAS). He has been Ringmaster at the Sydney Royal Easter Show on numerous occasions since 2007.

In 2022, Picken received the Medal of the Order of Australia for services to horse racing.
