= Noel Leary =

Australian rules footballer

Personal information
- Full name: Noel Dennis Leary
- Born: 3 September 1949 (age 77)
- Original team: Ulverstone
- Height: 183 cm (6 ft 0 in)
- Weight: 83 kg (183 lb)
- Position: Defender

Playing career^{1}
Years	Club	Games (Goals)
1970–73	Melbourne	19 (0)
- ^{1} Playing statistics correct to the end of 1973.

Noel Leary (born 3 September 1949) is a former Australian rules footballer who played for Melbourne in the Victorian Football League (VFL) during the early 1970s.

Leary, originally from Ulverstone, failed to make much of an impact at Melbourne, despite winning the reserves' best and fairest award in 1973. He did however became a prominent player in the Tasmanian Football League, firstly at Sandy Bay and then at Clarence. He captain-coached Clarence to premierships in 1979 and 1981.

He was one of the inaugural inductees into the Tasmanian Football Hall of Fame when it was launched in 2005.
