= Glenorchy Football Club =

Glenorchy

Names
- Full name: Glenorchy Football Club
- Former name: New Town Football Club
- Nickname(s): Magpies, Pies
- Motto: Fortis ad Finem (Fight to the Finish)

2023 season
- After finals: 7th
- Home-and-away season: 7th
- Leading goalkicker: Nathan Blowfield (13)

Club details
- Founded: 1919; 107 years ago
- Colours: Black and White
- President: John McCann
- Coach: Aaron Cornelius
- Captain: Joshua Arnold
- Premierships: 17 (1935, 1948, 1949, 1951, 1953, 1955, 1958, 1965, 1975, 1983, 1985, 1986, 1999, 2007, 2008, 2016)
- Ground: KGV Oval; Glenorchy, Tasmania (capacity: 18,000+ capacity)

Uniforms
Home

Other information
- Official website: glenorchymagpies.org.au

The Glenorchy District Football Club is an Australian rules football club currently playing in the Southern Football League in Tasmania, Australia.

== History ==
The club's history dates back to the New Town Football Club, which joined the TFL in the pre-district era in 1921. The club's original colours were green and gold.

In 1945, when the league adopted a district scheme, the New Town club was retained in the league as a district club. The district club adopted black and white colours, and became known as the Magpies.

New Town changed its name to Glenorchy in 1957 after absorbing the already established club Glenorchy Rovers and relocated its headquarters to KGV Oval at Glenorchy in Hobart's northern suburbs in the same year, playing its first match at the venue on 4 May 1957 against Hobart. It remains there to this day. After the death of the Tasmanian Football League in December 2000, the club was temporarily without a league to play in.

After some political maneuvering within football circles, Glenorchy were admitted to the Southern Football League, but at a high price from a traditional standpoint, with the club being forced, as a condition of entry to the League, to give up its black-and-white playing strip as well as its Magpies emblem, as it clashed with former Southern Amateur club Claremont Magpies, who were already a member of the SFL.

Glenorchy announced in early 2001 that they would adopt a new green, black & white playing uniform, and be known as the "Glenorchy Storm". This was not popular with fans, many of whom drifted away from the club, and its membership and support base decreased rapidly.

There was to be considerable rejoicing amongst its fans in 2004, after persistent pressure from the club, and the fact that Claremont were now playing in the SFL Regional League, which resulted in Glenorchy being granted the return of its black-and-white strip, and the Magpie emblem.

== Statistics ==
=== Club record attendance ===
24,968: 1979 TFL Grand Final vs Clarence Roos at North Hobart Oval.

=== Club record attendance (Home & Away) ===
8,480 + approx. 2000 non-paying juniors: 2011 TSL Round 1 vs Clarence Roos at KGV Oval

=== Club record score ===
TFL 34.21 (225) vs Hobart 18.14 (122) at KGV Oval Round 22, 1983.

== Senior coaches ==
Coach	Years	Competition	Premierships
Roy Cazaly	1948–1951	TANFL	1948, 1949, 1951
Bill Fox	1952	TANFL	
Jack Rough	1953–1960	TANFL	1953, 1955, 1956, 1958
John Chick	1961–1963	TANFL	
Bob Parsons	1964–1968	TANFL	1965
Graeme Gahan	1969–1970	TANFL	
Trevor Sprigg	1971–1974	TANFL	
Peter Hudson	1975–1976	TANFL	1975
Jack Rough	1977–1979	TANFL	
Colin Tully	1980	TANFL	
Peter Hudson	1981	TANFL	
Garry Davidson	1982–1984	TANFL	1983
Danny Ling	1985–1987	TANFL/TFL Statewide	1985, 1986
Robert Groenewegen	1988	TFL Statewide	
Billy Picken	1989	TFL Statewide	
Danny Ling	1990–1991	TFL Statewide	
Kim Excell	1992–1995	TFL Statewide	
Paul Hamilton	1996–1999	TFL Statewide/TSFL	1999
Shayne Stevenson	2000	SWL	
Steve Reissig	2001	SFL	
Leigh McConnon	2002	SFL	
John Klug	2003–2004	SFL	
David Newett	2005–2007	SFL	2007
Michael Bowden	2008	SFL	2008
Ben Reid	2009–2010	TSL	
Byron Howard	2011	SFL	
Ben Beams	2012–2013	TSL	
Aaron Cornelius	2014–2017	TSL	2016
Paul Kennedy	2018–2021	TSL	
Aaron Cornelius	2022–	TSL	

== Glenorchy District Football Club Team of the Century: 1919–2000 ==
- Backline: Roland Curley, Roy Witzerman, Allan Leitch.
- Half-back line: Trevor Sprigg, Barry Strange, Robbie Dykes.
- Centre line: Michael Styles (Capt), Neil Conlan, Ben Atkin.
- Half-forward line: John Klug, Max Griffiths, David Pearce.
- Forward line: Danny Ling, Peter Hudson, Gary Linton.
- Ruck: Jack Rough, Rex Garwood, Ron Marney.
- Interchange: John Chick, Matthew Mansfield, Kevin Morgan, Denis Lester, Kevin Baker, Adrian Fletcher, Max McMahon.

== VFL/AFL Players ==
Notable players that went on the play in the VFL/AFL who started at Glenorchy:

- Ben Brown
- Jimmy Webster
- Ryan Harwood
- Brodie Moles
- Aaron Cornelius
- Aaron Joseph
- Simon Wiggins
- Peter Street
- Brodie Holland
- Justin Wood
- Ben Beams
- Daryn Cresswell
- John Klug
- Adrian Fletcher
- Andy Lovell
- Matthew Mansfield
- Shane Fell
- Rodney Eade
- Wayne Fox
- Darryl Sutton
- Graham Fox
- Terry Cashion

Players who came to Glenorchy post-career:

- Peter Hudson
- Jason Akermanis
- Shayne Stevenson
- Darren Kappler
- Robert Groenewegen
- Shane Loveless
- Bill Picken
- Max McMahon
- Ian Bremner

== Honours ==
=== Club ===
- Tasmanian Football League
  - Premiers (14): 1935, 1948, 1949, 1951, 1953, 1955, 1956, 1958, 1965, 1975, 1983, 1985, 1986, 1999 (TSFL), 2016 (TSLW)
  - Runners up (20): 1923, 1926, 1946, 1950, 1954, 1957, 1961, 1966, 1967, 1976, 1977, 1978, 1979, 1980, 1982, 1984, 1987, 1988, 2009, 2015
- Southern Football League
  - Premiers (2): 2007, 2008
  - Runners up (2): 2001, 2006
- Tasmanian State Premiership (5): 1948, 1953, 1956, 1965, 1975

=== Individual ===
==== William Leitch Medallists ====
(Best and fairest player – TFL and SFL premier senior football)

- 1951 – Rex Garwood
- 1967 – Neville Johnston
- 1975 – Trevor Sprigg
- 1978 – Peter Hudson
- 1979 – Peter Hudson
- 1980 – Gary Linton
- 1988 – Adrian Fletcher
- 1999 – Ben Atkin
- 2005 – David Newitt
- 2006 – Jesse Crouch
- 2008 – Shane Piuselli

==== George Watt Medallists ====
(Best and fairest player – TFL reserves football)

- 1963 – Dal Johnson
- 1968 – W. Hayes
- 1973 – P. Lynsky (tied)
- 1981 – Wayne Olding
- 1987 – Mark Horner (three-way tie)
- 1988 – Steven Hay
- 2006 – Clinton French

==== V. A. Geard Medallists ====
(Best and fairest player – TFL thirds football)

- 1950 – J.Chick
- 1956 – D. Cranfield
- 1974 – L. Berwick
- 1981 – N. Jeffrey

==== D. R. Plaister Medallists ====
(Best and fairest – TFL fourths football)

- 1978 – Jamie Woolley
- 1991 – Craig Grace

==== Lefroy Medallists ====
(Best and fairest – Tasmanian state team)

- 1965 – M. McMahon (tied)
- 1979 – Darryl Sutton
- 1986 – David Pearce
- 2009 – Shane Piuselli (tied)
- 2019 – Aiden Grace

==== Horrie Gorringe Medallists ====
(Best on field in the Premier League Grand Final)

- 2007 – Brad Curran
- 2008 – Damian McIver

==== Tassie Medalists ====
- 2012 – Jaye Bowden
- 2015 – Jaye Bowden
- 2016 – Jaye Bowden
