= Clarence Football Club =

Clarence

Names
- Full name: Clarence Football Club
- Former name: Bellerive Football Club
- Nickname(s): Kangaroos, Roos
- Club song: "Clarence are the team to beat, I sing to you!"

2025 season
- After finals: 1st
- Home-and-away season: 2nd
- Leading goalkicker: Josh Green (74)
- Best and fairest: Josh Green

Club details
- Founded: 1884; 142 years ago
- Colours
- Competition: Southern Football League
- President: Nat Belbin
- Coach: Grant Fagan
- Captain: Baxter Norton
- Ground: Ninja Stadium (capacity: 19,500)

Uniforms
Home	Away

Other information
- Official website: goroos.com.au

The Clarence Football Club, nicknamed the Kangaroos, is an Australian rules football club playing in the Southern Football League, based in Bellerive, Tasmania. Before 1947, they existed as Bellerive Football Club.

The Club play their home games at Ninja Stadium (formerly Bellerive Oval And Blundstone Arena), Hobart's Test Cricket ground, they share the facilities with Tasmania's cricket team, the Tasmanian Tigers.

== History ==
Clarence joined the Tasmanian Football League in 1947 on a two-year probationary period from the Southern District Football Association, later being granted permanent status on 7 August 1950, and continued to participate in the league until it was disbanded in December 2000.

They then joined the Southern Football League and participated until the end of the 2008 season whereby the club opted to join the newly reformed Tasmanian State League from 2009 and have won the first two premiership titles on offer since joining the competition and only in the 2015 season missed out on the finals.

After the news of the introduction of the Tasmania Devils, the Tasmanian State League disbanded after the 2024 season to focus on the VFL Program. Clarence would rejoin the Southern Football League at the beginning of the 2025 season. The Southern Football League Premier League featured the remaining southern-based Tasmanian State League teams, Glenorchy, Kingborough, Lauderdale and North Hobart. Brighton would also be promoted from the Southern Football League Regional League to create a 6 team competition.

Clarence entered the 2025 season widely regarded as underdogs. Shockingly the Roos would only lose 5 games and finish the season in second position. Clarence would face Lauderdale in the First Final, but would be narrowly defeated by 14 points, the closest they had come to beating the Bombers all season. In the Preliminary Final the Roos would face another youthful team in North Hobart, they would defeat them by 34 points led by an inspiring performance from vice captain Oscar Paprotny. Resulting in the Roos first Grand Final appearance in 15 years. They would face Lauderdale, a team they had not beaten all season and many considered the overwhelming favourite. Clarence however would defeat Lauderdale by 39 points, claiming their first premiership since 2010.

== Club details ==
- Home ground – Ninja Stadium (formerly Bellerive Oval & Blundstone Arena)
- Established – 1884 (as Bellerive Football Club)
- Playing colours – Red and white (Maroon and white until 1979)
- Emblem – Kangaroos
- Club theme song – "Clarence are the team to beat, I sing to you!" (Tune: "The Battle Hymn of the Republic")
- Affiliations – Various junior competitions including the SDFA (1884–1946) TANFL/TFL/TSL (1947–2000, 2009–2024), SFL (2001–2008, 2025-present)

== Honours ==
=== Club ===
- Tasmanian Football League
  - Premiers (11): 1970, 1979, 1981, 1984, 1993, 1994, 1996, 1997, 2000, 2009, 2010
  - Runners-up (6): 1962, 1969, 1971, 1985, 1995, 1998
- Southern Football League
  - Premiers (5): 2001, 2002, 2004, 2006, 2025
  - Runners-up (2): 2005, 2007

=== Individual ===
William Leitch Medallists (Best and fairest player – TFL senior football)

- 1949 – Hamish Yaxley
- 1960 – Stuart Spencer
- 1967 – J.Richmond and Stuart Spencer
- 1968 – Bob Lucas
- 1976 – Trevor Sorrell
- 1989 – Scott Wade
- 1991 – Gary Williamson
- 1995 – Danny Noonan
- 1996 – Danny Noonan
- 1999 – Matthew Jones
- 2025 – Josh Green

Tassie Medallists (Best and fairest player – TSL senior football from 2009)

- 2010 – Brett Geappen

George Watt Medallists (Best and fairest player – TFL reserves football)

- 1957 – B. Burn (tied)
- 1974 – P. Smith

V. A. Geard Medallists (Best and fairest player – TFL thirds football)

- 1957 – Russell Newell
- 1965 – Royce Hart
- 1973 – P. Smith
- 1979 – M. Kruene

D. R. Plaister Medallists (Best and fairest player – TFL fourths football)

- 1978 – T. Carter
- 1984 – Brendan Mayne
- 1990 – Steven Old

Dolphin Medallists (Best and fairest player – NFL Shield)

- 1989 – Scott Wade

Lefroy Medallists (Best and fairest player – Tasmanian team)

- 1956 – J.Golding
- 1957 – S. Spencer (tied)
- 1960 – S. Spencer
- 1981 – Rod Hughes (tied)
- 1988 – Billy Picken
- 1989 – Scott Wade
- 2012 – Brady Jones
- 2016 – Jake Cox

All-Australian team members

- 1958 – S. Spencer

Club record score:

- TFL: 38.16 (244) vs Devonport 4.4 (28) on 14 August 1999 at Bellerive Oval
- SFL: 41.23 (269) vs Brighton 5.4 (34) on 7 May 2005 at Bellerive Oval

Club games record holder:

- 315 – Scott McCallum from 1989 to 2007
- 314 – Gavin Cooney from 1989 to 2006 and 2009

=== Attendance records ===
Record home attendance: Bellerive Oval

- 5,157 – Clarence v New Norfolk on 6 June 1970 at Bellerive Oval

Record roster match attendance: all time

- 8,480 – Clarence v Glenorchy on 4 April 2011 at KGV Oval

Record TANFL/TFL finals attendance:

- 24,968 – Clarence v Glenorchy on 22 September 1979 for the TANFL Grand Final at North Hobart Oval

Record SFL Premier League finals attendance:

- 7,149 – Clarence v Glenorchy – 2006 SFL Premier League Grand Final at North Hobart Oval.

== Current playing list ==
Clarence Football Club
Senior list				Coaching staff
1 Fraser Turner; 2 Max Geappen; 3 Sam Green; 4 Tyson Hanslow (vc); 5 Baxter Norton (c); 6 James Glover; 7 Daniel Cooney; 8 Ryan Williamson; 9 Lachlan Davey; 10 Harry Richmond; 11 Ollie Preshaw; 12 William Busch; 13 Blake Harper; 14 Khalen Matthews; 15 Josh Green; 16 Riley Johnstone; 17 Maddox Iverlach; 18 Oscar Paprotny (vc)	19 Lucas Wotton; 20 Max Mapley; 21 Jason Gridley; 22 Archie Hurd; 23 Jye Millward; 24 TBC; 25 Addison Rowley; 26 Jack Callinan; 27 Blake Grant; 28 Harry Elmer; 29 Riley Walters; 30 Jack Mansfield; 31 Ethan Williamson; 32 Nicholas Steele; 33 Ryan Borsboom; 34 Jarvis Breen; 35 Tommy Geappen; 36 Hugh McCallum	37 Ollie Hill; 38 TBC; 39 Bayley Aziz; 40 Samuel Free; 41 Oliver Talbot; 42 TBC; 43 Jonty Winch; 44 Lopes Boaventura; 45 TBC; 46 Thomas Crossin; 47 Lucas Brady; 48 TBC; 49 TBC; 50 Louis Slyvester; 51 TBC; 52 Elijah Ryan; 53 Lucas Bosworth; 54 Luke Hodge	55 Samuel Chivers; 56 Archie Bastin; 57 TBC; 58 Flynn Preshaw; 59 Ashton Haw; 60 Jacob Mapley; 61 Bradley Vincent; 62 Isaac Dixon; 63 William Latham; 64 Zac Barwin; 65 Jack Downham; 66 TBC; 67 Edward Johnstone; 68 TBC; 69 TBC; 70 Max Slyvester; 71 Eli Bott; 72 Harvey Alomes	Head coach: Grant Fagan; Legend: (c) Captain(s); (vc) Vice-captain(s); Updated: 2025; Source(s):

== Notable players ==
There is a list of past and present Clarence players who have played at AFL/VFL:

- Colin Alexander (Collingwood and Brisbane Bears)
- Daniel Archer (St Kilda)
- Jack Bennett (1920–1997) (Carlton)
- Arthur Budd (1945–2012) (South Melbourne)
- Ian Callinan (Adelaide)
- Terry Cashion (1921–2011) (South Melbourne)
- John Chivers (Richmond)
- David Donato (Fitzroy)
- Robert Dutton (Carlton and Hawthorn)
- Bert Edwards (1914–1995) (Richmond)
- Josh Green (Brisbane Lions and Essendon)
- Graeme Hatcher (Essendon)
- Paul Holdsworth (Sydney Swans)
- Graham Hunnibell (Melbourne)
- Noel Leary (Melbourne)
- Royce Hart (Richmond)

- Bob Lynch (Fitzroy)
- Rod MacPherson (Footscray and Brisbane Bears)
- Stephen MacPherson (Footscray)
- Terry Mayne (1950–1983) (Geelong)
- Danny Noonan (Brisbane Bears)
- Eric Pascoe (Carlton)
- Bradley Plain (Essendon, Collingwood and North Melbourne)
- John Richmond (Richmond)
- Jack Riewoldt (Richmond)
- Justin Sherman (Brisbane Lions and Western Bulldogs)
- Stuart Spencer (1932–2011) (Melbourne)
- Scott Sutcliffe (Melbourne and Richmond)
- Cameron Thurley (Geelong and Kangaroos)
- Scott Wade (Hawthorn)
- Jeromey Webberley (Richmond)
- Michael Young (Carlton and Melbourne)
