= 1978 Hawthorn Football Club season =

54th season in the Victorian Football League

Hawthorn Football Club
1978 season
- President: Phil J. Ryan
- Coach: David Parkin
- Captain: Don Scott
- Home ground: Princes Park
- VFL season: 16–6 (2nd)
- Finals series: Premiers (Defeated North Melbourne 121–103)
- Best and Fairest: Peter Knights; Leigh Matthews
- Leading goalkicker: Michael Moncrieff (90)
- Highest home attendance: 100,704 (Grand Final vs. North Melbourne)
- Lowest home attendance: 9,198 (Round 7 vs. Footscray)
- Average home attendance: 30,329

The 1978 season was the Hawthorn Football Club's 54th season in the Victorian Football League and 77th overall. Hawthorn qualified for finals for the fifth consecutive season. Hawthorn qualified for their sixth Grand Final and first since 1976. Hawthorn won their fourth VFL premiership defeating North Melbourne in the Grand Final 121–103. This was their first premiership since 1976.

== Fixture ==
=== Premiership season ===
Rd	Date and local time	Opponent	Scores (Hawthorn's scores indicated in bold)			Venue	Attendance	Record
Rd	Date and local time	Opponent	Home	Away	Result	Venue	Attendance	Record
1	Saturday, 1 April (2:10 pm)	Melbourne	**22.15 (147)**	9.14 (68)	Won by 79 points	Princes Park (H)	11,986	1–0
2	Saturday, 8 April (2:10 pm)	South Melbourne	16.8 (104)	**18.24 (132)**	Won by 28 points	Lake Oval (A)	15,072	2–0
3	Saturday, 15 April (2:10 pm)	North Melbourne	16.15 (111)	**12.14 (86)**	Lost by 25 points	VFL Park (A)	39,097	2–1
4	Saturday, 22 April (2:10 pm)	Collingwood	14.19 (103)	**15.15 (105)**	Won by 2 points	Victoria Park (A)	29,577	3–1
5	Saturday, 29 April (2:10 pm)	Fitzroy	**14.17 (101)**	15.12 (102)	Lost by 1 point	Princes Park (H)	13,788	3–2
6	Saturday, 6 May (2:10 pm)	Carlton	19.12 (126)	**24.13 (157)**	Won by 31 points	Princes Park (A)	19,649	4–2
7	Saturday, 13 May (2:10 pm)	Footscray	**27.15 (177)**	13.13 (91)	Won by 86 points	Princes Park (H)	9,198	5–2
8	Saturday, 20 May (2:10 pm)	Richmond	9.16 (70)	**14.15 (99)**	Won by 29 points	VFL Park (A)	27,224	6–2
9	Saturday, 27 May (2:10 pm)	St Kilda	8.9 (57)	**13.19 (97)**	Won by 40 points	Moorabbin Oval (A)	25,293	7–2
10	Saturday, 3 June (2:10 pm)	Geelong	**12.24 (96)**	8.13 (61)	Won by 35 points	Princes Park (H)	11,203	8–2
11	Saturday, 17 June (2:10 pm)	Essendon	16.8 (104)	**19.19 (133)**	Won by 29 points	Windy Hill (A)	24,217	9–2
12	Saturday, 24 June (2:10 pm)	Melbourne	15.18 (108)	**18.20 (128)**	Won by 20 points	Melbourne Cricket Ground (A)	14,652	10–2
13	Saturday, 1 July (2:10 pm)	South Melbourne	**21.14 (140)**	18.11 (119)	Won by 21 points	Princes Park (H)	13,853	11–2
14	Saturday, 8 July (2:10 pm)	Collingwood	**10.14 (74)**	13.6 (84)	Lost by 10 points	VFL Park (H)	46,086	11–3
15	Saturday, 15 July (2:10 pm)	North Melbourne	**10.14 (74)**	7.13 (55)	Won by 19 points	Princes Park (H)	16,214	12–3
16	Saturday, 22 July (2:10 pm)	Fitzroy	18.14 (122)	**17.19 (121)**	Lost by 1 point	Junction Oval (A)	12,299	12–4
17	Saturday, 29 July (2:10 pm)	Carlton	**13.17 (95)**	18.11 (119)	Lost by 24 points	Princes Park (H)	28,118	12–5
18	Saturday, 5 August (2:10 pm)	Footscray	17.10 (112)	**17.16 (118)**	Won by 6 points	Western Oval (A)	17,255	13–5
19	Saturday, 12 August (2:10 pm)	Richmond	**18.19 (127)**	10.10 (70)	Won by 57 points	Princes Park (H)	15,979	14–5
20	Saturday, 19 August (2:10 pm)	St Kilda	**12.11 (83)**	21.13 (139)	Lost by 56 points	VFL Park (H)	31,677	14–6
21	Saturday, 26 August (2:10 pm)	Geelong	13.8 (86)	**13.10 (88)**	Won by 2 points	Kardinia Park (A)	21,663	15–6
22	Saturday, 2 September (2:10 pm)	Essendon	**17.16 (118)**	16.13 (109)	Won by 9 points	Princes Park (H)	14,534	16–6

=== Finals Series ===
Rd	Date and local time	Opponent	Scores (Hawthorn's scores indicated in bold)			Venue	Attendance
Rd	Date and local time	Opponent	Home	Away	Result	Venue	Attendance
Qualifying Final	Saturday, 9 September (2:30 pm)	Collingwood	**23.16 (154)**	14.14 (98)	Won by 56 points	Melbourne Cricket Ground (H)	79,931
Second semi-final	Saturday, 16 September (2:30 pm)	North Melbourne	10.13 (73)	**12.15 (87)**	Won by 14 points	VFL Park (A)	48,716
Grand Final	Saturday, 30 September (2:50 pm)	North Melbourne	**18.13 (121)**	15.13 (103)	Won by 18 points	Melbourne Cricket Ground (H)	101,704

== Ladder ==
(P)	Premiers
	Qualified for finals

#	Team	P	W	L	D	PF	PA	%	Pts
1	North Melbourne	22	16	6	0	2407	1991	120.9	64
2	Hawthorn (P)	22	16	6	0	2496	2120	117.7	64
3	Collingwood	22	15	7	0	2347	2072	113.3	60
4	Carlton	22	14	8	0	2329	1994	116.8	56
5	Geelong	22	12	10	0	2153	2104	102.3	48
6	St Kilda	22	11	10	1	2330	2503	93.1	46
7	Richmond	22	10	11	1	2459	2389	102.9	42
8	South Melbourne	22	9	13	0	2390	2383	100.3	36
9	Fitzroy	22	8	14	0	2258	2339	96.5	32
10	Essendon	22	8	14	0	2203	2337	94.3	32
11	Footscray	22	7	15	0	2272	2508	90.6	28
12	Melbourne	22	5	17	0	2025	2929	69.1	20

Rules for classification: 1. premiership points; 2. percentage; 3. points for
Average score: 104.8
Source: AFL Tables
