= Australian Football Media Association Player of the Year =

The Australian Football Media Association Player of the Year award (also known as the Australian Football Media Association MVP award) is an award for the Australian Football League (AFL) given by the Australian Football Media Association (AFMA). It has been awarded annually since 1973, with the exception of 2003, when no award was given.

== Winners ==
Season	Recipient(s)	Club(s)
1973	George Bisset	Collingwood
1974	Kevin Sheedy	Richmond
1975	Alex Jesaulenko and Brian Roberts	Carlton and South Melbourne
1976	Peter Knights	Hawthorn
1977	Don Scott	Hawthorn
1978	Malcolm Blight	North Melbourne
1979	Kevin Bartlett	Richmond
1980	Kelvin Templeton	Footscray
1981	Peter Moore	Collingwood
1982	Leigh Matthews	Hawthorn
1983	Wayne Schimmelbusch	North Melbourne
1984	Terry Daniher	Essendon
1985	Simon Beasley	Footscray
1986	Paul Roos	Fitzroy
1987	John Platten	Hawthorn
1988	Gerard Healy	Sydney
1989	Tim Watson	Essendon
1990	Peter Daicos	Collingwood
1991	Jim Stynes	Melbourne
1992	Jason Dunstall	Hawthorn
1993	Gary Ablett Sr.	Geelong
1994	Greg Williams	Carlton
1995	Garry Lyon	Melbourne
1996	James Hird	Essendon
1997	Robert Harvey	St Kilda
1998	Wayne Carey	North Melbourne
1999	Shane Crawford	Hawthorn
2000	Anthony Koutoufides	Carlton
2001	Michael Voss	Brisbane Lions
2002	Luke Darcy	Western Bulldogs
2003	No award given	
2004	Nick Riewoldt	St Kilda
2005	Ben Cousins	West Coast
2006	Adam Goodes	Sydney
2007	Gary Ablett, Jr.	Geelong
2008	Brent Harvey	North Melbourne
2009	Dane Swan	Collingwood
2010	Dane Swan	Collingwood
