= 1980 Hawthorn Football Club season =

56th season in the Victorian Football League

Hawthorn Football Club
1980 season
- President: Ron Cook
- Coach: David Parkin
- Captain: Don Scott
- Home ground: Princes Park
- VFL season: 10–12 (8th)
- Finals series: Did not qualify
- Best and Fairest: Leigh Matthews
- Leading goalkicker: Michael Moncrieff (86)
- Highest home attendance: 34,224 (Round 15 vs. Geelong)
- Lowest home attendance: 8,209 (Round 14 vs. Fitzroy)
- Average home attendance: 18,479

The 1980 season was the Hawthorn Football Club's 56th season in the Victorian Football League and 79th overall.

== Fixture ==
=== Premiership season ===
Rd	Date and local time	Opponent	Scores (Hawthorn's scores indicated in bold)			Venue	Attendance	Record
Rd	Date and local time	Opponent	Home	Away	Result	Venue	Attendance	Record
1	Saturday, 29 March (2:10 pm)	Richmond	**15.16 (106)**	16.15 (111)	Lost by 5 points	Princes Park (H)	20,775	0–1
2	Saturday, 5 April (2:10 pm)	St Kilda	11.17 (83)	**15.26 (116)**	Won by 33 points	Moorabbin Oval (A)	22,265	1–1
3	Saturday, 12 April (2:10 pm)	Collingwood	**19.16 (130)**	16.23 (119)	Won by 11 points	Princes Park (H)	28,232	2–1
4	Saturday, 19 April (2:10 pm)	Fitzroy	12.10 (82)	**11.19 (85)**	Won by 3 points	VFL Park (A)	26,104	3–1
5	Friday, 25 April (2:10 pm)	Geelong	14.10 (94)	**13.11 (89)**	Lost by 5 points	Kardinia Park (A)	34,498	3–2
6	Saturday, 3 May (2:10 pm)	Footscray	**19.16 (130)**	18.5 (113)	Won by 17 points	Princes Park (H)	11,758	4–2
7	Saturday, 10 May (2:10 pm)	Carlton	14.27 (111)	**16.17 (113)**	Won by 2 points	Princes Park (A)	28,788	5–2
8	Saturday, 17 May (2:10 pm)	Melbourne	**17.16 (118)**	15.18 (108)	Won by 10 points	Princes Park (H)	10,501	6–2
9	Saturday, 24 May (2:10 pm)	North Melbourne	14.9 (93)	**13.10 (88)**	Lost by 5 points	VFL Park (A)	34,384	6–3
10	Saturday, 31 May (2:10 pm)	South Melbourne	28.15 (183)	**14.15 (99)**	Lost by 84 points	Lake Oval (A)	17,420	6–4
11	Saturday, 7 June (2:10 pm)	Essendon	**9.17 (71)**	13.11 (89)	Lost by 18 points	Princes Park (H)	21,221	6–5
12	Monday, 16 June (2:10 pm)	Richmond	16.12 (108)	**11.22 (88)**	Lost by 20 points	Melbourne Cricket Ground (A)	57,572	6–6
13	Saturday, 21 June (2:10 pm)	St Kilda	**21.17 (143)**	16.13 (109)	Won by 34 points	Princes Park (H)	11,686	7–6
14	Saturday, 28 June (2:10 pm)	Fitzroy	**21.17 (143)**	8.7 (55)	Won by 88 points	Princes Park (H)	8,209	8–6
15	Saturday, 12 July (2:10 pm)	Geelong	**4.13 (37)**	17.15 (117)	Lost by 80 points	VFL Park (H)	34,224	8–7
16	Saturday, 19 July (2:10 pm)	Collingwood	22.17 (149)	**19.8 (122)**	Lost by 27 points	Victoria Park (A)	25,090	8–8
17	Saturday, 26 July (2:10 pm)	Footscray	25.10 (160)	**15.17 (107)**	Lost by 53 points	Western Oval (A)	12,362	8–9
18	Saturday, 2 August (2:10 pm)	Carlton	**9.15 (69)**	16.17 (113)	Lost by 44 points	Princes Park (H)	15,046	8–10
19	Saturday, 9 August (2:10 pm)	Melbourne	9.10 (64)	**19.27 (141)**	Won by 77 points	Melbourne Cricket Ground (A)	15,457	9–10
20	Saturday, 16 August (2:10 pm)	North Melbourne	**11.13 (79)**	20.15 (135)	Lost by 56 points	VFL Park (H)	21,739	9–11
21	Saturday, 23 August (2:10 pm)	South Melbourne	**16.17 (113)**	12.11 (83)	Won by 30 points	VFL Park (H)	19,882	10–11
22	Saturday, 30 August (2:10 pm)	Essendon	15.12 (102)	**8.14 (62)**	Lost by 40 points	Windy Hill (A)	17,744	10–12

== Ladder ==
(P)	Premiers
	Qualified for finals

#	Team	P	W	L	D	PF	PA	%	Pts
1	Geelong	22	17	5	0	2362	1888	125.1	68
2	Carlton	22	17	5	0	2576	2128	121.1	68
3	Richmond (P)	22	16	5	1	2754	1990	138.4	66
4	North Melbourne	22	14	7	1	2345	1894	123.8	58
5	Collingwood	22	14	7	1	2491	2178	114.4	58
6	South Melbourne	22	13	9	0	2211	2174	101.7	52
7	Essendon	22	10	12	0	2268	2151	105.4	40
8	Hawthorn	22	10	12	0	2249	2381	94.5	40
9	Melbourne	22	5	17	0	2140	2709	79.0	20
10	Footscray	22	5	17	0	2056	2737	75.1	20
11	St Kilda	22	4	16	2	1872	2704	69.2	20
12	Fitzroy	22	4	17	1	2398	2788	86.0	18

Rules for classification: 1. premiership points; 2. percentage; 3. points for
Average score: 105.0
Source: AFL Tables
