= Richard Walter =

Richard Walter may refer to:

- Richard Walter (psychologist), American forensic psychologist
- Richard Walter (writer), American author, educator and screenwriter
- Richard Walter (footballer) (born 1959), former Australian footballer
- Richard Walter (archaeologist), New Zealand archaeologist
- Richard H. Walter (1920–2016), American politician in the state of Iowa
- Richard Walter (chaplain), author of Lord Anson's memoir, with some input by Benjamin Robins
- Richard Walter (actor), British actor and son of actor Wilfred Walter

== See also ==
- Richard Water (died 1416), MP for Canterbury
- Richard Walters (disambiguation)
