= 1978 VFL grand final =

Grand final of the 1978 Victorian Football League season

1978 VFL Grand Final

North Melbourne	Hawthorn
15.13 (103)	18.13 (121)
	1	2	3	4
NM	2.2 (14)	7.8 (50)	10.12 (72)	15.13 (103)
HAW	5.3 (33)	7.4 (46)	14.10 (94)	18.13 (121)
- Date: 30 September 1978
- Stadium: Melbourne Cricket Ground, Melbourne, Australia
- Attendance: 101,704

Broadcast in Australia
- Network: Seven Network
- Commentators: Lou Richards; Peter Landy

The 1978 VFL grand final was an Australian rules football game contested between the Hawthorn Football Club and North Melbourne Football Club at the Melbourne Cricket Ground on 30 September 1978. It was the 82nd annual Grand Final of the Victorian Football League, staged to determine the premiers for the 1978 VFL season. The match, attended by 101,704 spectators, was won by Hawthorn by a margin of 18 points, marking that club's fourth premiership victory.

== Background ==
It was the third time in four seasons that these two sides met in the grand final, and it was North Melbourne's fifth successive grand final. North Melbourne was the reigning premier, having defeated Collingwood in the 1977 VFL grand final.

At the conclusion of the home-and-away season, North Melbourne had finished on top of the ladder with 16 wins and 6 losses. Hawthorn had finished second, also with 16 wins but with an inferior percentage.

In the finals series leading up to the grand final, Hawthorn comfortably defeated Collingwood in the qualifying final by 56 points, before beating North Melbourne by 10 points in the second semi-final to progress to the grand final. North Melbourne, after the second semi-final loss, defeated Collingwood by 12 points in the preliminary final to progress to the grand final.

In the week leading up to the grand final, North Melbourne's Malcolm Blight was awarded the Brownlow Medal.

== Match summary ==
North Melbourne went into the game without a number of players from the previous season's premiership victory – star full-back David Dench, who had injured his knee in round 3, ruckman Peter Keenan, who had received a two-match suspension for striking Hawthorn captain Don Scott in the last quarter of the semi-final, and injured utilities Steven Icke and Brent Crosswell.

=== First quarter ===
Hawthorn got off to a fast start, with forward Michael Moncrieff kicking three goals (including two goals in the first two minutes of the game), and they led by nineteen points at quarter time.

=== Second quarter ===
North Melbourne had the better of the second quarter, with Phil Baker becoming the focal point of the North Melbourne attack and taking the mark of the year over Ian Paton. He helped North Melbourne kick five goals to two to lead by four points at half time.

=== Third quarter ===
Hawthorn had a strong third quarter which saw them kick seven goals whilst keeping North Melbourne to only three. A key shift in momentum occurred when two North Melbourne players spoiled each other in the goal square at the 6-minute mark, when a mark and a goal could have put them 17 points up. The Hawks went on to dominate play after this incident, kicking 6.3 to North's one behind in the next 12 minutes.

=== Fourth quarter ===
The teams traded goals in the fourth quarter, and North Melbourne was not able to significantly reduce the margin. After being flattened off the ball, Peter Knights was moved forward, kicking two goals then taking a spectacular mark beside the behind post.

For Hawthorn, Leigh Matthews was considered best on ground with 28 disposals and four goals, lifting his game when the result was on the line. Also important was Robert DiPierdomenico, who gave Hawthorn considerable attacking drive off half back and kept his opponent Arnold Briedis, considered by Hawthorn to be North Melbourne's most dangerous forward, quiet for most of the match. First year player Terry Wallace was prominent in the midfield, gathering 21 kicks.

Besides the loss of Keenan, Icke and Crosswell before the match, North Melbourne lost Malcolm Blight early with a torn groin muscle after just five minutes, and Stan Alves also limped off in the second quarter.

== Aftermath ==
The win was the first for David Parkin as coach. He had previously captained Hawthorn to the 1971 VFL grand final victory, and later went on to coach Carlton to premierships in the 1980s and 1990s.

Hawthorn's next premiership came five years later, when they won the 1983 VFL grand final against Essendon. It would take another 18 years for North Melbourne to appear in another premiership decider, when it defeated the Sydney Swans in the 1996.

== Teams ==
Hawthorn	North Melbourne

Hawthorn
B:	27 Alle De Wolde	15 Kelvin Moore	42 Ian Paton
HB:	10 David Polkinghorne	24 Peter Knights	9 Robert DiPierdomenico
C:	2 Geoff Ablett	16 Terry Wallace	26 Rodney Eade
HF:	43 Peter Murnane	14 Alan Martello	25 John Hendrie
F:	45 Richard Walter	6 Michael Moncrieff	4 Peter Russo
Foll:	23 Don Scott (c)	17 Michael Tuck	3 Leigh Matthews (vc)
Int:	20 Michael McCarthy	1 Norm Goss	
Coach:	David Parkin		

North Melbourne
B:	34 Ross Henshaw	4 Ross Glendinning	13 Gary Cowton
HB:	12 Ken Montgomery	5 Darryl Sutton	27 Keith Greig (c)
C:	2 Stan Alves	25 Xavier Tanner	20 Wayne Schimmelbusch (a/vc)
HF:	6 Arnold Briedis	16 Stephen McCann	44 Maurice Boyse
F:	15 Malcolm Blight	29 Phil Baker	10 Ray Huppatz
Foll:	22 Mick Nolan	21 John Byrne	17 Graham Melrose
Int:	46 Doug Smith	3 John Cassin	
Coach:	Ron Barassi		

== Scoreboard ==
Grand final
Saturday, 30 September (2:32 pm)	North Melbourne	def. by	Hawthorn	Melbourne Cricket Ground (crowd: 101,704)	Report
2.2 (14); 7.8 (50); 10.12 (72); 15.13 (103)	Q1; Q2; Q3; Final	5.3 (33); 7.4 (46); 14.10 (94); 18.13 (121)	Umpires: Deller, Robinson; Television broadcast: Seven Network
Baker 6 Briedis, Huppatz, Boyse, Smith 2 Melrose 1	Goals	4 Moncrieff, Matthews; 3 Scott; 2 Knights; 1 Ablett, Martello, Hendrie, Eade, Murnane
Schimmelbusch, Huppatz, Baker, Sutton, Henshaw, Glendinning, Nolan, Byrne	Best	DiPierdomenico, Matthews, Moore, Wallace, Scott, Tuck, Eade, Ablett
Blight (groin), Alves (hamstring)	Injuries	Knights (slight concussion), DiPierdomenico (bruised leg)
Nil	Reports	Nil
Hawthorn won their 4th premiership.

== See also ==
- 1978 VFL season
