= Rodney Eade =

Australian rules footballer, born 1958

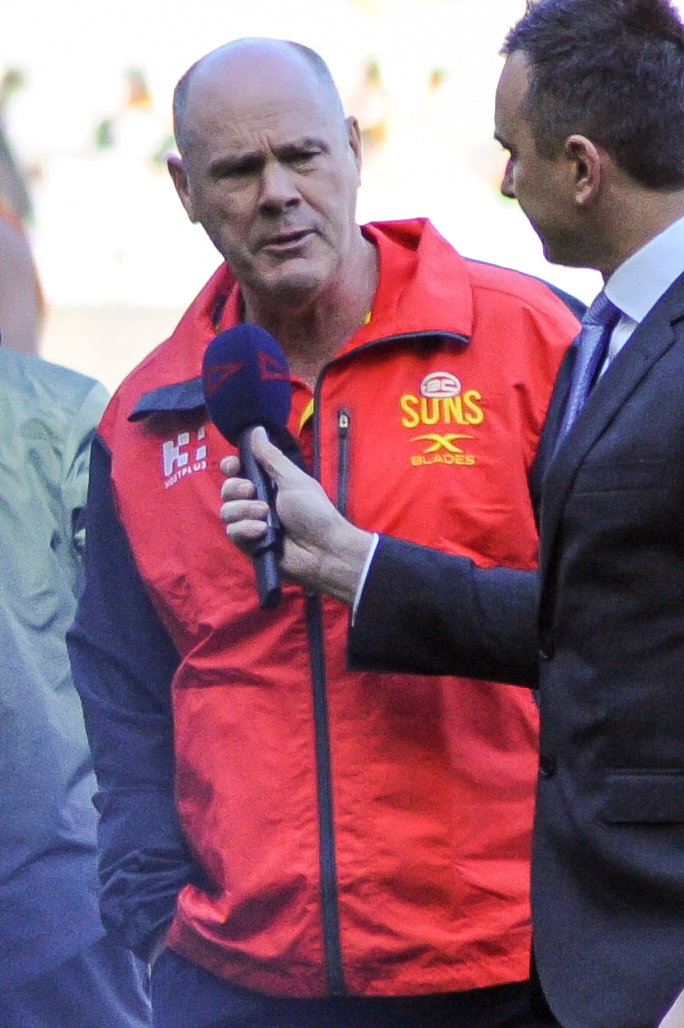
- Eade in June 2017

Personal information
- Full name: Rodney Eade
- Nicknames: Speed, Rocket
- Born: 4 April 1958 (age 68); Tasmania
- Original team: Glenorchy
- Height: 183 cm (6 ft 0 in)
- Weight: 84 kg (185 lb)
- Position: Wingman

Playing career^{1}
| Years | Club | Games (Goals) |
| 1976–1987 | Hawthorn | 229 (46) |
| 1988–1990 | Brisbane Bears | 30 (3) |
| Total | | 259 (49) |

Coaching career^{3}
| Years | Club | Games (W–L–D) |
| 1996–2002 | Sydney | 152 (81–69–2) |
| 2005–2011 | Western Bulldogs | 162 (88–72–2) |
| 2015–2017 | Gold Coast | 63 (16–46–1) |
| 2011 | Representative; Australia | 2 (0–2–0) |
| Total | | 379 (185–189–5) |
- ^{1} Playing statistics correct to the end of 1990.^{3} Coaching statistics correct as of the end of 2016.

Career highlights
- VFL premiership player: 1976, 1978, 1983, 1986; Tasmanian Football Hall of Fame; AFL reserves premiership coach: 1995

Rodney Eade (born 4 April 1958) is a former Australian rules footballer and coach in the Australian Football League. He is a former coach of the Sydney Swans, the Western Bulldogs and the Gold Coast Football Club. He has, to date, coached 377 games of AFL football, placing him first on the all-time AFL/VFL list of most games coached without a premiership.

== Playing career ==
=== Hawthorn ===
Recruited from Glenorchy, while still a schoolboy, young Rodney Eade made his VFL debut for the Hawthorn Football Club as an 18-year-old. Playing with a lot of dash and blistering speed, Eade capped off his debut season by playing in the 1976 premiership team. He went on to play in the Hawks' 1978, 1983, and 1986 premierships sides. In all, the winger played 229 games and kicked 46 goals for Hawthorn between 1976 and 1987.

=== Brisbane Bears ===
His time at the Hawks finished when he moved to the Brisbane Bears in 1988. Suffering injuries later on as he got older, Eade managed to play 30 games and kicked three goals until his retirement in 1990.

== Coaching career ==
Immediately following his retirement from his playing career at the end of 1990, Eade took up coaching. In 1991 he was the reserves coach of the Brisbane Bears and led the Bears to the reserves' premiership in that season. He later coached the North Melbourne reserves, and led it to the premiership in 1995. These successes at reserves level gave Eade a strong case for a senior coaching job in 1996.

=== Sydney Swans ===
Eade was appointed as senior coach of the Sydney Swans in the 1996 season, replacing Ron Barassi. In his first year, he took the Swans to the 1996 AFL Grand Final, but they lost to North Melbourne by 43 points. In his second year, in the 1997 season, Sydney finished sixth but were eliminated in the qualifying finals by the Western Bulldogs. In the 1998 season, Sydney improved to third on the ladder and defeated St Kilda in the qualifying finals, before losing to eventual premiers Adelaide in the semi-finals. In the 1999 season, Sydney finished in eighth spot on the ladder, and were eliminated in the qualifying finals after losing to Essendon by 69 points. In the 2000 season, Sydney finished eleventh and missed the finals. In the 2001 season, he took Sydney back to the finals, finishing in seventh spot on the ladder, but they lost to Hawthorn in the elimination final. In the 2002 season, with Sydney's record under Eade becoming worse week by week and being placed fourteenth on the ladder, Eade resigned following a narrow Round 12 loss to Geelong; he was replaced by assistant coach Paul Roos as caretaker senior coach for the rest of the 2002 season and Roos was eventually appointed full-time senior coach.

=== Western Bulldogs ===
Eade was appointed senior coach of the Western Bulldogs for the 2005 season, replacing Peter Rohde who was sacked at the end of the 2004 season. In his first season as Bulldogs senior coach, he took an under-achieving Bulldogs side to ninth spot on the ladder, barely missing out on finals after they had finished with less than five wins in the previous two years. In the 2006 season, he took the Bulldogs to the finals for the first time since 2000, when they were coached by Terry Wallace. In the finals, the Bulldogs defeated Collingwood in the elimination finals but lost to eventual premiers West Coast in the semi-finals. Following a sudden downturn during the 2007 season in which the team finished thirteenth, Eade's job was in jeopardy; the club ultimately chose not to fire him, but limited his expansive duties.

In the 2008 season, the Bulldogs finished third on the ladder and made their first preliminary final since 1998, but they were eliminated by eventual runners-up Geelong. In the 2009 season and the 2010 season, Eade took the Bulldogs to two more consecutive preliminary finals, falling to St Kilda on both occasions.

The Western Bulldogs under Eade did not perform well in the 2011 season, being placed twelfth on the ladder. Following a big loss to Essendon by 49 points in Round 21, 2011, it was announced on 17 August 2011 that Eade's contract would not be renewed at the conclusion of the 2011 season. The following day, Eade stepped down as senior coach of the Bulldogs. He was replaced by assistant coach Paul Williams as caretaker senior coach for the remainder of the 2011 season.

=== Collingwood ===
On 3 October 2011, Eade was appointed by Collingwood to the position of Football and Coaching Strategist, replacing outgoing coach Mick Malthouse, who had originally planned to step into that role after the 2011 season. In September 2013, Eade changed positions when he was appointed to the position of director of football at Collingwood Football Club.

=== Gold Coast Suns ===
On 30 October 2014, Eade was appointed the Gold Coast Suns second senior coach, replacing Guy McKenna. Eade's first year as senior coach, in the 2015 season, was largely unsuccessful as the Gold Coast Suns finished sixteenth on the ladder with four wins and seventeen losses. The Suns were only marginally better in the 2016 season, finishing fifteenth on the ladder with six wins and sixteen losses. After round 20 of the 2017 season, as the Suns sat in fifteenth place with three games remaining, Eade was told his contract would not be renewed. Eade departed immediately and was replaced by assistant coach Dean Solomon as caretaker senior coach for the rest of the 2017 season.

== Post-coaching career ==
On 18 January 2024, it was announced Eade returned to Hawthorn Football Club, the club he formerly played for, in the club's administration department as Capital Campaign Executive, helping elevate fundraising efforts for the Kennedy Community Centre.

== Media career ==
Eade spent 2003 and 2004 as a media writer and commentator.

== Cricketing career ==
Eade was a talented junior cricketer, making his senior cricketing debut for Glenorchy Cricket Club aged 14. On his debut Eade scored 31*, sharing a match saving partnership with future Australian Test cricketer Roger Woolley.

== Statistics ==
=== Playing statistics ===
Legend
| G | Goals | K | Kicks | D | Disposals | T | Tackles |
| B | Behinds | H | Handballs | M | Marks |

| Led the league after season and finals |

| Season | Team | No. | Games | Totals | | | | | | | Averages (per game) | | | | | | | Votes |
| Season | Team | No. | Games | G | B | K | H | D | M | T | G | B | K | H | D | M | T | Votes |
|---|---|---|---|---|---|---|---|---|---|---|---|---|---|---|---|---|---|---|
| 1976† | Hawthorn | 26 | 9 | 4 | 3 | 130 | 28 | 158 | 25 | —N/a | 0.4 | 0.3 | 14.4 | 3.1 | 17.6 | 2.8 | —N/a | 0 |
| 1977 | Hawthorn | 26 | 22 | 6 | 8 | 248 | 76 | 324 | 45 | —N/a | 0.3 | 0.4 | 11.3 | 3.5 | 14.7 | 2.0 | —N/a | 0 |
| 1978† | Hawthorn | 26 | 25 | 5 | 7 | 362 | 86 | 448 | 89 | —N/a | 0.2 | 0.3 | 14.5 | 3.4 | 17.9 | 3.6 | —N/a | 2 |
| 1979 | Hawthorn | 26 | 21 | 9 | 6 | 317 | 70 | 387 | 48 | —N/a | 0.4 | 0.3 | 15.1 | 3.3 | 18.4 | 2.3 | —N/a | 2 |
| 1980 | Hawthorn | 26 | 20 | 2 | 1 | 305 | 84 | 389 | 99 | —N/a | 0.1 | 0.1 | 15.3 | 4.2 | 19.5 | 5.0 | —N/a | 6 |
| 1981 | Hawthorn | 26 | 14 | 5 | 4 | 170 | 61 | 231 | 45 | —N/a | 0.4 | 0.3 | 12.1 | 4.4 | 16.5 | 3.2 | —N/a | 0 |
| 1982 | Hawthorn | 26 | 23 | 3 | 5 | 311 | 149 | 460 | 69 | —N/a | 0.1 | 0.2 | 13.5 | 6.5 | 20.0 | 3.0 | —N/a | 4 |
| 1983† | Hawthorn | 26 | 22 | 1 | 3 | 297 | 132 | 429 | 72 | —N/a | 0.0 | 0.1 | 13.5 | 6.0 | 19.5 | 3.3 | —N/a | 3 |
| 1984 | Hawthorn | 26 | 22 | 4 | 6 | 260 | 100 | 360 | 71 | —N/a | 0.2 | 0.3 | 11.8 | 4.5 | 16.4 | 3.2 | —N/a | 3 |
| 1985 | Hawthorn | 26 | 21 | 5 | 3 | 233 | 88 | 321 | 76 | —N/a | 0.2 | 0.1 | 11.1 | 4.2 | 15.3 | 3.6 | —N/a | 3 |
| 1986† | Hawthorn | 26 | 14 | 1 | 2 | 171 | 64 | 235 | 46 | —N/a | 0.1 | 0.1 | 12.2 | 4.6 | 16.8 | 3.3 | —N/a | 0 |
| 1987 | Hawthorn | 26 | 16 | 1 | 0 | 188 | 74 | 262 | 39 | 24 | 0.1 | 0.0 | 11.8 | 4.6 | 16.4 | 2.4 | 1.5 | 0 |
| 1988 | Brisbane Bears | 26 | 13 | 1 | 4 | 178 | 53 | 231 | 62 | 13 | 0.1 | 0.3 | 13.7 | 4.1 | 17.8 | 4.8 | 1.0 | 0 |
| 1989 | Brisbane Bears | 26 | 12 | 1 | 3 | 129 | 37 | 166 | 39 | 21 | 0.1 | 0.3 | 10.8 | 3.1 | 13.8 | 3.3 | 1.8 | 0 |
| 1990 | Brisbane Bears | 26 | 5 | 1 | 0 | 68 | 22 | 90 | 19 | 5 | 0.2 | 0.0 | 13.6 | 4.4 | 18.0 | 3.8 | 1.0 | 0 |
| Career | | | 259 | 49 | 55 | 3367 | 1124 | 4491 | 844 | 63 | 0.2 | 0.2 | 13.0 | 4.3 | 17.3 | 3.3 | 1.4 | 23 |

=== Coaching statistics ===
Legend
| W | Wins | L | Losses | D | Draws | W% | Winning percentage | LP | Ladder position | LT | League teams |

| Season | Team | Games | W | L | D | W % | LP | LT |
|---|---|---|---|---|---|---|---|---|
| 1996 | Sydney | 25 | 18 | 6 | 1 | 74.0% | 1 | 16 |
| 1997 | Sydney | 23 | 12 | 11 | 0 | 52.2% | 6 | 16 |
| 1998 | Sydney | 24 | 15 | 9 | 0 | 62.5% | 3 | 16 |
| 1999 | Sydney | 23 | 11 | 12 | 0 | 47.7% | 8 | 16 |
| 2000 | Sydney | 22 | 10 | 12 | 0 | 45.5% | 10 | 16 |
| 2001 | Sydney | 23 | 12 | 11 | 0 | 52.2% | 7 | 16 |
| 2002 | Sydney | 12 | 3 | 8 | 1 | 29.2% | 14^ | 16 |
| 2005 | Western Bulldogs | 22 | 11 | 11 | 0 | 50.0% | 9 | 16 |
| 2006 | Western Bulldogs | 24 | 14 | 10 | 0 | 58.3% | 8 | 16 |
| 2007 | Western Bulldogs | 22 | 9 | 12 | 1 | 43.2% | 13 | 16 |
| 2008 | Western Bulldogs | 25 | 16 | 8 | 1 | 66.0% | 3 | 16 |
| 2009 | Western Bulldogs | 25 | 16 | 9 | 0 | 64.0% | 3 | 16 |
| 2010 | Western Bulldogs | 25 | 15 | 10 | 0 | 60.0% | 4 | 16 |
| 2011 | Western Bulldogs | 19 | 7 | 12 | 0 | 36.8% | 12^ | 17 |
| 2015 | Gold Coast | 22 | 4 | 17 | 1 | 20.5% | 16 | 18 |
| 2016 | Gold Coast | 22 | 6 | 16 | 0 | 27.3% | 15 | 18 |
| 2017 | Gold Coast | 19 | 6 | 13 | 0 | 31.5% | 15 | 18 |
| Career totals | | 377 | 185 | 187 | 5 | 49.07% | | |

^Eade resigned twice mid-season; in 2002, Sydney were fourteenth when he resigned and in 2011, the Western Bulldogs were twelfth when he resigned.
