= 1980 Brownlow Medal =

- Winner: Kelvin Templeton (Footscray); 23 votes

Television/radio coverage
- Network: Seven Network

The 1980 Brownlow Medal was the 53rd year the award was presented to the player adjudged the fairest and best player during the Victorian Football League (VFL) home and away season. Kelvin Templeton of the Footscray Football Club won the medal by polling twenty-three votes during the 1980 VFL season.

== Leading votegetters ==
	Player	Votes
1st	Kelvin Templeton (Footscray)	23
2nd	Merv Neagle (Essendon)	20
3rd	Rod Blake (Geelong)	19
4th	Peter Moore (Collingwood)	18
5th	Tim Watson (Essendon)	17
=6th	Chris Smith (Fitzroy)	16
=6th	Leigh Matthews (Hawthorn)	16
=6th	Mark Lee (Richmond)	16
=9th	Keith Greig (North Melbourne)	15
=9th	Gary Dempsey (North Melbourne)	15
