= Peter Knights =

Australian rules footballer, born 1946

Personal information
- Born: 30 March 1952 (age 74)
- Original team: Longwarry
- Debut: Round 9, 1969, Hawthorn vs. St Kilda, at Moorabbin Oval
- Height: 188 cm (6 ft 2 in)
- Weight: 84 kg (185 lb)

Playing career^{1}
Years	Club	Games (Goals)
1969–1985	Hawthorn	264 (201)

Coaching career
Years	Club	Games (W–L–D)
1987–1989	Brisbane Bears	59 (16–43–0)
1994–1995	Hawthorn	45 (20–25–0)
Total		104 (36–68–0)
- ^{1} Playing statistics correct to the end of 1985.

Career highlights
- 3× VFL Premiership player: 1976, 1978, 1983; 2× Peter Crimmins Perpetual Memorial Trophy: 1975, 1978; Hawthorn leading goalkicker: 1972; 2× Simpson Medal: 1971, 1978; Australian Football Media Association Player of the Year: 1976; 3× Mark of the Year: 1972, 1975, 1977; Australian Football Hall of Fame, inducted 1996; Hawthorn Hall of Fame – Legend status; Hawthorn Team of the century

Peter Knights (born 30 March 1952) is a former professional Australian rules footballer who played for Hawthorn in the Victorian Football League (VFL). After retiring as a player, he was appointed the inaugural coach of the Brisbane Bears and later returned to coach Hawthorn during the 1990s.

Knights is widely regarded as one of the greatest centre half-backs ever to played Australian rules football, he has become notable for his high marking and torpedo punt kicking. He was one of the inaugural inductees when the Australian Football Hall of Fame was launched in 1996, and was appointed the eighth Legend in Hawthorn's Hall of Fame in 2017. Although considered unlucky not to win the game's highest individual honour, the Brownlow Medal , having twice finished runner-up in the vote count - Knights was nonetheless part of three VFL premiership teams during a highly successful era for the Hawks.

It was fortuitous for Hawthorn that Knights' career coincided with that of fellow Hawthorn and AFL champion Leigh Matthews, with both making their senior VFL debuts in the same year (1969) and also finishing their careers the same year (1985). However, while Matthews' robust physique enabled him to play well over 300 games, Knights - who was no less courageous in going for the ball - struggled to reach 250 games over the same time period due to the many serious injuries he suffered over the course of his playing career.

== Playing career ==
=== Early years ===
Knights was one of two children born to Lindsay Thomas Knights and his wife Fay, the other child being his sister Alison. They were raised on the family dairy farm near the town of Longwarry, situated over 80 kilometres south-east of Melbourne. Knights played football for Longwarry - which at the time was in the West Gippsland Football League - and attended Drouin High School (now Drouin Secondary College), where in his final year (1970) he was named School Captain. However, due to his busy schedule of constantly commuting to and from Melbourne for training and games with Hawthorn, Knights was unable to attain the academic grades he wanted. Subsequently, Hawthorn coach John Kennedy sr. suggested that Knights repeat his year 12 studies at Camberwell High School. Upon Kennedy's passing in 2020, Knights reminisced fondly about that time:

He [Kennedy] was very high up in the education department at that time, on the teachers' tribunal, and he strongly recommended to my parents that young Peter should come to Melbourne and do his schooling in Melbourne. He said to my parents it will help his [Knights'] footy and certainly help his schooling... I was so intimidated about doing that but, as it turned out, it was the best move I could have made.

Conveniently for Knights, he was able to stay with relatives in Canterbury, the suburb where Camberwell High School was situated. The school was also near Glenferrie Oval, Hawthorn's home ground at the time. He was in his own words a "quiet and shy" country kid when he arrived at Hawthorn, and it would be rover Peter Crimmins who helped Knights settle in at the club. He became easily identifiable on the field because of his blond hair and his ability to take high marks. He was also a proponent of the drop kick and the torpedo punt kick.

After playing only five games in his debut season, Knights established himself in the first team in 1970. The following year he did so well in that position that he was chosen for Victoria, winning the Simpson Medal for the best on ground in the match against Western Australia in Perth. However, he missed out on Hawthorn's 1971 premiership success due to a knee injury.

Knights was moved briefly to full-forward in 1972 after a serious knee injury to Peter Hudson forced Hawthorn to experiment in the position before finally settling on Michael Moncrieff. He actually finished as Hawthorn's leading goal-kicking with 46 goals, but was moved back to defence before the season was over. After injury problems restricted his 1973 season, for the next three years Knights was rated the best centre half-back in the game. In 1975, Knights finally had the chance to participate in the first of four Grand Finals. North Melbourne were too good on the day, winning their first-ever Premiership. Knights was Hawthorn's best player on the day, and capped off a fine personal year by winning the club Best and Fairest award.

=== Premiership Success ===
Knights' stellar form continued into 1976 before he suffered a broken collarbone early in the match against Footscray in Round 14, which ruled him out for the next seven matches. Despite this, Knights still managed to come second in the 1976 Brownlow Medal count, polling an astonishing 45 votes to finish three votes behind Essendon's Graham Moss. He shrugged off that disappointment to be one of Hawthorn's best players in the 1976 VFL Grand Final triumph, later joining some of his teammates at Peter Crimmins' bedside.

From 1977 onwards Knights was frequently rested up forward to reduce the risk of injuries, but still did enough great work at centre half-back to finish one vote behind Malcolm Blight in the 1978 Brownlow Medal count. He would shrug off the disappointment of finishing runner-up in the Brownlow by starring in the 1978 VFL Grand Final. After being knocked out while playing in defence, Knights was moved forward in the last quarter, where he took a series of fine marks and kicked two goals to help secure Hawthorn's fourth Premiership. During his stellar 1978 season Knights also claimed his second Simpson Medal with a dominant display for Victoria against WA in Perth.

=== Later Playing Years ===
The litany of injuries that Knights had suffered through his career began to catch up with him, and from 1979 to 1981, he played in only 26 out of a possible 66 games. Amid rumours of retirement, Knights rebounded to play impressive football in his final years. In 1983, he booted six goals in the Qualifying Final to guide Hawthorn to a thrilling four-point win against Fitzroy, and was again among the best players on the field as the Hawks crushed Essendon in the Grand Final. Knights reached the 250-game milestone the following season against St Kilda, gathering 23 possessions and kicking two goals, but a knee injury restricted him to just three further games.

In the lead-up to the 1985 VFL season, Knights endured more misfortune when he fell ill during a Reserves match against Essendon at VFL Park on 23 March. He left the ground at three-quarter time and was taken to Fairfield Hospital after the game, suffering from vomiting and shaking. While heat exhaustion had been ruled out, the illness was thought to be a mysterious virus and kept Knights in hospital for several days. Once back into the senior side, Knights showed traces of brilliant form – kicking nine goals against Carlton in Round 10. The Preliminary Final against Footscray would turn out to be his final VFL game. He had just four disposals, and was dropped for the Grand Final, a surprising decision for some people, given his reputation as a performer on the VFL's biggest stage. Yet again, Knights would bounce back from the disappointment to finish his career in a semblance of style, kicking a bag of goals to help Hawthorn defeat Carlton in the reserves Grand Final.

== Coaching career ==
Although Knights enjoyed spectacular success on the field, it was a different story as a senior coach. However, it should also be remembered that he was in charge of teams that were either relatively new and inexperienced (Brisbane), or undergoing restructuring (Hawthorn).

=== Brisbane Bears senior coach ===
In 1986, the VFL decided to expand and include one team each from Western Australia and Queensland. The Brisbane Bears, based on the Gold Coast in South East Queensland, recruited Knights as their inaugural senior coach, despite his lack of coaching experience. The club won their first game, and although expectations of the new side were low, it was considered a significant achievement that the team was able to avoid finishing last in their first season. Despite this, the Bears' results in 1988 and 1989 failed to improve, with the club suffering regular thrashings. Besides the substandard quality of the training and playing facilities, lack of assistance from the VFL, and squad disharmony, Knights also had limited control over team selection; part way through the 1988 VFL season, he wanted star signing Warwick Capper dropped from the senior team due to poor form, but was overruled by club president Paul Cronin. Knights was sacked as Brisbane Bears senior coach with seven games remaining in the 1989 season and replaced with team psychologist, Paul Feltham. Knights was considered to have been unlucky, as ineffective club management and poor relationships amongst his underperforming players seen as major contributing factors in the club's performance.

=== Devonport Football Club ===
Kneights then went to do brief coaching stint at Tasmanian club Devonport from 1990 to 1993,

=== Hawthorn Football Club senior coach ===
Knights returned to Hawthorn as senior coach for the 1994 AFL season. He managed to lead the team into the finals series, but were knocked out by North Melbourne in the first final. The following year the team finished second last, however, and Knights was again sacked.

=== Other coaching roles ===
In 2009, Knights was appointed senior representative coach of the Victorian Country Football League and held the position until 2016.

== Statistics ==
=== Playing statistics ===
Legend
G	Goals	K	Kicks	D	Disposals
B	Behinds	H	Handballs	M	Marks

VFL playing statistics
Season	Team	No.	Games	Totals						Averages (per game)						Votes
Season	Team	No.	Games	G	B	K	H	D	M	G	B	K	H	D	M	Votes
1969	Hawthorn	24	5	3	1	34	9	43	10	0.6	0.2	6.8	1.8	8.6	2.0	0
1970	Hawthorn	24	18	5	0	265	28	293	84	0.3	0.0	14.7	1.6	16.3	4.7	4
1971	Hawthorn	24	22	4	1	320	29	349	130	0.2	0.0	14.5	1.3	15.9	5.9	2
1972	Hawthorn	24	20	46	27	247	15	262	111	2.3	1.4	12.4	0.8	13.1	5.6	9
1973	Hawthorn	24	15	8	5	157	30	187	50	0.5	0.3	10.5	2.0	12.5	3.3	3
1974	Hawthorn	24	24	1	1	328	39	367	121	0.0	0.0	13.7	1.6	15.3	5.0	6
1975	Hawthorn	24	23	3	4	326	35	361	123	0.1	0.2	14.2	1.5	15.7	5.3	9
1976^{#}	Hawthorn	24	18	2	0	241	46	287	76	0.1	0.0	13.4	2.6	15.9	4.2	45
1977	Hawthorn	24	19	15	8	222	70	292	82	0.8	0.4	11.7	3.7	15.4	4.3	5
1978^{#}	Hawthorn	24	22	8	10	329	105	434	142	0.4	0.5	15.0	4.8	19.7	6.5	21
1979	Hawthorn	24	11	10	7	143	54	197	53	0.9	0.6	13.0	4.9	17.9	4.8	5
1980	Hawthorn	24	7	1	3	79	24	103	25	0.1	0.4	11.3	3.4	14.7	3.6	0
1981	Hawthorn	24	8	1	2	91	39	130	47	0.1	0.3	11.4	4.9	16.3	5.9	5
1982	Hawthorn	24	14	14	18	141	52	193	54	1.0	1.3	10.1	3.7	13.8	3.9	2
1983^{#}	Hawthorn	24	21	38	29	279	108	387	144	1.8	1.4	13.3	5.1	18.4	6.9	7
1984	Hawthorn	24	4	5	3	33	13	46	21	1.3	0.8	8.3	3.3	11.5	5.3	0
1985	Hawthorn	24	13	37	19	121	23	144	75	2.8	1.5	9.3	1.8	11.1	5.8	3
Career			264	201	138	3356	719	4075	1348	0.8	0.5	12.7	2.7	15.4	5.1	126

=== Coaching statistics ===
Legend
W	Wins	L	Losses	D	Draws	W%	Winning percentage	LP	Ladder position	LT	League teams

Season	Team	Games	W	L	D	W %	LP	LT
1987	Brisbane Bears	22	6	16	0	27.3%	13	14
1988	Brisbane Bears	22	7	15	0	31.8%	13	14
1989	Brisbane Bears	15	3	12	0	20.0%	—N/a	14
1994	Hawthorn	23	13	10	0	56.5%	6	15
1995	Hawthorn	22	7	15	0	31.8%	15	16
Career totals		104	36	68	0	34.6%		

== Honours and achievements ==
=== Playing ===
Team

- 3× VFL premiership player (Hawthorn): 1976, 1978, 1983
- 2× Minor premiership (Hawthorn): 1971, 1975

Individual

- 2× Peter Crimmins Perpetual Memorial Trophy: 1975, 1978
- Hawthorn leading goalkicker: 1972
- 2× Victoria Australian rules football team: 1971, 1983
- 2× Simpson Medal: 1971, 1978
- Australian Football Media Association Player of the Year: 1976
- 3× Mark of the Year: 1972, 1975, 1977
- Australian Football Hall of Fame inductee
- Hawthorn Hall of Fame inductee – Legend status
- Hawthorn Team of the century

=== Coaching ===
Individual

- Queensland Australian rules football team: 1988

== Personal life ==
Knights had a son, Benjamin, in 1978 with his first wife Julie. He divorced and remarried Angela, a schoolteacher, and had two daughters, Sarah (born 1993) and Rebecca. In February 2015, Knights publicly revealed that Sarah had been struggling with a mystery illness that left her unable to walk. Sarah and her mother flew to Germany for specialist treatment, where a diagnosis of Lyme disease was confirmed. They returned to Melbourne later in the year to commence intensive rehabilitation.
