= Richard Walters =

Richard Walters may refer to:

- Richard Walters (singer-songwriter), English songwriter, singer and musician
- Richard Walters (political advisor) (born 1989), American political advisor
- Slick Rick (Richard Walters, born 1965), British-American rapper
- Richard Leroy Walters (1931–2007), philanthropist
- Richard John Walters (born 1961), American film and television actor
- Dick Walters (born 1946/1947), basketball coach
- Richard Walters, actor best known as Tiny on Degrassi and Degrassi: Next Class

== See also ==
- Rick Walters (disambiguation)
- Richard Walter (disambiguation)
