= Michael Wright (Australian footballer) =

Australian rules footballer

Personal information
- Full name: Michael Wright
- Born: 6 October 1959 (age 67)
- Original team: Oakleigh Districts
- Height: 187 cm (6 ft 2 in)
- Weight: 84 kg (185 lb)

Playing career^{1}
Years	Club	Games (Goals)
1978–1980	South Melbourne	40 (14)
1981–1983	Central District	60 (165)
- ^{1} Playing statistics correct to the end of 1983.

Michael Wright (born 6 October 1959) is a former Australian rules footballer who played with South Melbourne in the Victorian Football League (VFL).

Wright was a versatile key-position player, recruited from Oakleigh Districts, the same club his brother Stephen started out at. Their father Jack holds the most games played record with the Box Hill Football Club.

He first played in the 1978 VFL season. In his second game, against Fitzroy at Junction Oval, he kicked five behinds but only one goal. Despite starting as a forward, he was often as a full-back by South Melbourne and he had his most productive season in 1979 with 17 appearances. He played some good football from centre half-forward in 1980 and in a win over Footscray took nine marks and had 21 disposals.

In 1981 he was involved in a three-way trade, which resulted in him joining SANFL club Central District. North Melbourne player Maurice Boyse was Wright's replacement, and North received Peter Jonas from Central District.

As a forward, he was a regular fixture in the Central District team but after a pay dispute in 1984 left the club for North Adelaide.

He is the brother of Stephen Wright.
