= Kelvin Templeton =

Australian rules footballer, born 1956

Personal information
- Born: 30 September 1956 (age 70)
- Original team: Traralgon (LVFL)
- Height: 191 cm (6 ft 3 in)
- Weight: 94 kg (207 lb)
- Position: Forward

Playing career^{1}
Years	Club	Games (Goals)
1974–1982	Footscray	143 (494)
1983–1985	Melbourne	34 (99)
Total		177 (593)
- ^{1} Playing statistics correct to the end of 1985.

Career highlights
- Brownlow Medal: 1980; Footscray Captain: 1982; 2× Charles Sutton Medal: 1978, 1980; 2× Coleman Medal: 1978, 1979; 5× Footscray leading goalkicker: 1976, 1977, 1978, 1979, 1980; Melbourne leading goalkicker: 1984; Victorian State representative: 1978, 1980; Australian Football Hall of Fame: Inducted 2024

Kelvin Templeton (born 30 September 1956) is a former Australian rules footballer. At sixteen years of age Templeton kicked 100 goals for Traralgon in the 1973 Latrobe Valley Football League season.

Footscray, within whose country zone Traralgon was located, eyed Templeton continuously from that point, and he joined the club for the 1974 season at a time when the club had been desperately short of matchwinning goalkickers ever since Jack Collins retired in the 1950s. His debut against Collingwood was a sensation, for Templeton kicked six goals at full-forward. However, it was felt Templeton was too skinny at around 81.5 kilograms (180 lb), and it was only when he did major weight training that he really began to excel. In 1976, Templeton kicked 82 goals, with a best of seven against South Melbourne.

After an injury-ruined 1977, Templeton came back to head the goalkicking table for 1978 with 118, including a career-best performance of 15 goals against St Kilda on 1 July. During this match Templeton set a record of 24 scoring shots (15 goals, nine behinds). Footscray kicked a then-record score of 33 goals fifteen behinds (213 points) in this match and his combined total with Ian Dunstan of 22 goals is a record for two players on one side in a VFL/AFL match. Despite this phenomenal feat, Footscray finished eleventh of twelve teams with only six other wins for the year.

Templeton was the league's leading goalkicker for the second consecutive year but after an appalling start to the 1980 season with eleven consecutive losses coach Royce Hart moved Templeton to centre half-forward in order to bring him closer to the action. The move worked so well that Templeton became the first forward to win the Brownlow Medal and still kicked over seventy goals.

In 1981, however, Templeton could play only six games due to a serious knee injury, and nagging injuries reduced his effectiveness during his last year with Footscray in 1982. Melbourne bought Templeton as part of a buying spree for 1983 but the injuries did not abate and he played only 34 games for the Demons before announcing his retirement in April 1986.

He would later become the CEO of the Sydney Swans from 1995-2002.

In 1980 Templeton covered the song "Who's Sorry Now" for the album Footy Favourites – a collection of songs sung by VFL players. He could not sing at all so spoke the words.

Templeton has authored a novel called “Collision”, which was published in September, 2025.

== Statistics ==
**Brownlow Medal votes**
Season	Votes
1974	—
1975	2
1976	2
1977	5
1978	5
1979	2
**1980**	**23**
1981	—
1982	—
1983	3
1984	2
1985	—
**Total**	**44**
Key:
Green / **Bold** = Won

Legend
G	Goals	K	Kicks	D	Disposals	T	Tackles
B	Behinds	H	Handballs	M	Marks

Led the league after the season and finals

Season	Team	No.	Games	Totals							Averages (per game)						
Season	Team	No.	Games	G	B	K	H	D	M	T	G	B	K	H	D	M	T
1974	Footscray	31	12	25	18	92	14	106	54	—N/a	2.1	1.5	7.7	1.2	8.8	4.5	—N/a
1975	Footscray	31	14	29	18	92	19	111	62	—N/a	2.1	1.4	7.1	1.5	8.5	4.8	—N/a
1976	Footscray	31	23	82	39	201	14	215	117	—N/a	3.6	1.7	8.7	0.6	9.3	5.1	—N/a
1977	Footscray	31	9	40	19	84	9	93	46	—N/a	4.4	2.4	9.3	1.0	10.3	5.1	—N/a
1978	Footscray	31	21	**118**	**65**	253	27	280	176	—N/a	**5.6**	**3.1**	12.0	1.3	13.3	8.4	—N/a
1979	Footscray	31	22	**91**	**62**	238	27	265	150	—N/a	4.1	**2.8**	10.8	1.2	12.0	6.8	—N/a
1980	Footscray	31	22	75	33	329	84	413	188	—N/a	3.4	1.5	15.0	3.8	18.8	8.5	—N/a
1981	Footscray	31	6	8	7	68	28	96	45	—N/a	1.3	1.2	11.3	4.7	16.0	7.5	—N/a
1982	Footscray	31	14	26	21	170	61	231	98	—N/a	1.9	1.5	12.1	4.4	16.5	7.0	—N/a
1983	Melbourne	31	13	38	29	104	20	124	68	—N/a	2.9	2.2	8.0	1.5	9.5	5.2	—N/a
1984	Melbourne	31	16	51	19	103	14	117	69	—N/a	3.2	1.2	6.4	0.9	7.3	4.3	—N/a
1985	Melbourne	31	5	10	5	24	7	31	16	—N/a	2.0	1.0	4.8	1.4	6.2	3.2	—N/a
Career			177	593	335	1758	324	2082	1089	—N/a	3.4	1.9	10.0	1.8	11.8	6.2	—N/a
