= Alle De Wolde =

Australian rules footballer

Personal information
- Born: 27 December 1955 (age 70)
- Original team: Box Hill Baptist Pioneers
- Height: 182 cm (6 ft 0 in)
- Weight: 83 kg (183 lb)

Playing career^{1}
Years	Club	Games (Goals)
1975–1983	Hawthorn	97 (14)
- ^{1} Playing statistics correct to the end of 1982.

Career highlights
- 1978 VFL Premiereship

Alle De Wolde (born 27 December 1955) is a former Australian rules footballer who played for Hawthorn in the VFL.

A back pocket specialist, De Wolde arrived at Hawthorn from Box Hill and was a member of Hawthorn's 1978 premiership side. De Wolde was a handy reserves player for his final few years at the club along with other veterans like Turner, Wade, Goad and Moncrieff.
