= Ray Huppatz =

Australian rules footballer

Personal information
- Full name: Raymond Keith Huppatz
- Born: 6 October 1948 (age 78)
- Height: 170 cm (5 ft 7 in)
- Weight: 70 kg (154 lb)
- Position: Rover

Playing career^{1}
Years	Club	Games (Goals)
1966–1973, 1981	Woodville	142 (254)
1974–1977	Footscray	66 (74)
1978, 1980	North Melbourne	19 (21)
1982–1984	Port Adelaide	38 (54)
Total		265 (403)
- ^{1} Playing statistics correct to the end of 1984.

Raymond Keith Huppatz (born 6 October 1948) is a former Australian rules footballer who played with Footscray and North Melbourne in the Victorian Football League (VFL), and Woodville and Port Adelaide in the South Australian National Football League (SANFL).

Huppatz, a rover, had already made a name for himself in South Australian football prior to joining the VFL. He was a four-time best and fairest winner at Woodville, with awards in 1969-1971 and 1973. From 1966 to 1973 he played 125 SANFL games for Woodville, which saw him form a strong ruck combination with Malcolm Blight. In this period he regularly represented South Australia at interstate football, including at the 1972 Perth Carnival.

Footscray recruited Huppatz for the 1974 VFL season and he made an immediate impression with 30 goals that year. In 1976 he was chosen to represent Victoria in a game against Western Australia. He finished his Victorian career with a stint at North Melbourne and he kicked two goals from the forward pocket in the 1978 Grand Final loss to Hawthorn. A knee injury kept him out of the entire 1979 season, and he managed just seven games in 1980.

After returning to South Australia, he played a further season with Woodville to bring his final club games tally to 142. He spent his final three years at Port Adelaide, but his appearances were far from regular and he finished with 38 games at the Magpies, for a total of 180 in the SANFL and 265 in elite Australian rules football.

In 2003, he was inducted into the South Australian Football Hall of Fame.
