= Richard Walter (footballer) =

Australian footballer

Personal information
- Born: 8 April 1959 (age 67)
- Original team: North Kew
- Height: 193 cm (6 ft 4 in)
- Weight: 100 kg (220 lb)

Playing career^{1}
Years	Club	Games (Goals)
1977–1980	Hawthorn	20 (18)
- ^{1} Playing statistics correct to the end of 1980.

Richard Walter (born 8 April 1959) is a former Australian rules footballer who played with Hawthorn in the VFL during the late 1970s.

Walter was recruited by Hawthorn from North Kew and made his VFL debut in 1977. The following season he played as a forward pocket in their premiership team.
