= Daryl Schimmelbusch =

Australian rules footballer

Personal information
- Full name: Daryl Frederick Schimmelbusch
- Born: 30 December 1954 (age 71)
- Original team: Brunswick (VFA)
- Height: 165 cm (5 ft 5 in)
- Weight: 68 kg (150 lb)

Playing career^{1}
Years	Club	Games (Goals)
1978–1981	North Melbourne	47 (27)
- ^{1} Playing statistics correct to the end of 1981.

Daryl Frederick Schimmelbusch (born 30 December 1954) is a former Australian rules footballer who played with North Melbourne in the VFL. He is the younger brother of Wayne Schimmelbusch.

Schimmelbusch made his debut for North Melbourne in 1978 after playing in the reserves the previous season where he won the Gardiner Medal. He played 47 games over 4 seasons with the Kangaroos.

In 1982 he joined West Torrens in the SANFL. He earned South Australian interstate selection in 1984 He finished his career at West Torrens in 1985.
