= Stephen Wright (Australian rules footballer) =

Australian rules footballer

Personal information
- Born: 6 March 1961 (age 65)
- Original team: Oakleigh District
- Height: 171 cm (5 ft 7 in)
- Weight: 73 kg (161 lb)

Playing career^{1}
Years	Club	Games (Goals)
1979–1992	South Melbourne/Sydney	246 (247)

Coaching career
Years	Club	Games (W–L–D)
1993–1995	Clarence	62 (51–11–0)
1996–1997	Central District	45 (29–16–0)
- ^{1} Playing statistics correct to the end of 1992.

Career highlights
- Bob Skilton Medalist 1985, 1990; South Melbourne Team of the Century; 2x Clarence premiership coach 1993, 1994

Stephen "Stevie" Wright (born 6 March 1961) is a former Australian rules footballer who played for the Sydney Swans in the Victorian/Australian Football League.

Wright won Sydney's best and fairest award in 1985 and 1990.

In 1996 and 1997, Wright was coach of Central District, in the South Australian National Football League.

He coached the Highett Football Club in 2007 and 2008 in the Southern Football League. In 2010, he became the Southern Football League senior interleague coach.

He has coached Murrumbeena in the Southern Football Netball League since 2014.

He is the brother of Michael Wright.
