= 1978 Brownlow Medal =

- Date: 25 September
- Location: Southern Cross Ballroom
- Winner: Malcolm Blight (North Melbourne); 22 votes

Television/radio coverage
- Network: Seven Network

The 1978 Brownlow Medal was the 51st year the award was presented to the player adjudged the fairest and best player during the Victorian Football League (VFL) home and away season. Malcolm Blight of the North Melbourne Football Club won the medal by polling twenty-two votes during the 1978 VFL season.

== Leading votegetters ==
	Player	Votes
1st	Malcolm Blight (North Melbourne)	22
2nd	Peter Knights (Hawthorn)	21
3rd	Garry Wilson (Fitzroy)	20
4th	Kevin Bartlett (Richmond)	19
5th	Gary Dempsey (Footscray)	16
6th	Graham Teasdale (South Melbourne)	15
=7th	Michael Tuck (Hawthorn)	14
=7th	Geoff Raines (Richmond)	14
=7th	Robert Flower (Melbourne)	14
	Ray Shaw (Collingwood)*	14

* The player was ineligible to win the medal due to suspension by the VFL Tribunal during the year.
