= Australian rules football positions =

The positions as seen on an oval, for the team kicking toward the top of the diagram.

In the sport of Australian rules football, each of the eighteen players in a team is assigned to a particular named position on the field of play. These positions describe both the player's main role and by implication their location on the ground. As the game has evolved, tactics and team formations have changed, and the names of the positions and the duties involved have evolved too. There are 18 on-field positions in professional Australian rules football, not including the interchange players (normally between two and six) who may replace another player on the ground at any time during play. Women's football uses 16 players, with one less forward and defender. Junior football can often decrease the numbers further, based on player availability or ground size.

The fluid nature of the modern game means the positions in football are not as formally defined as in sports such as rugby or American football. Even so, most players will play in a limited range of positions throughout their career, as each position requires a particular set of skills. Footballers who are able to play comfortably in numerous positions are referred to as utility players.

In an effort to maintain traditional positions and prevent teams "flooding" their defensive side of the ground, the "6-6-6" rule was introduced ahead of the 2019 season. At the beginning of each quarter and after a goal is scored, each team must have a maximum of six players in each 50m arc, and six players in the middle section of the ground. Of the six players in the middle section, each team is also restricted to a maximum of four within the centre square, including one in the centre circle. If this is breached, the ruckman for the offending side receives a warning on behalf of the team. If the rule is again breached, a free kick is awarded.

Australian rules football positions
B:	back pocket	full-back	back pocket
HB:	half-back flank	centre half-back	half-back flank
C:	wing	centre	wing
HF:	half-forward flank	centre half-forward	half-forward flank
F:	forward pocket	full-forward	forward pocket
Foll:	ruckman	ruck rover	rover
Int:	interchange bench	interchange bench	interchange bench
Int:	interchange bench		
Coach:	coach		

== Back line ==
The term back line can either refer to the full-back line consisting of the two back pockets and the full-back, or both the full- and half-back lines, which collectively can also be referred to as the defence, defensive unit or the back six.

=== Full-back ===
The full-back position has always been a purely defensive role, with the aim of stopping the full-forward from getting the ball and scoring. But, in recent times, where the ability to move the ball out of the back and down the field quickly has become a more important tactic, the full-back often starts a chain of passes up the ground. The defensive aspect of the position remains important, with the ability to accelerate and change direction quickly. Spoiling the ball is also of utmost importance. The full-back often kicks the ball back into play after a point has been scored, although some teams prefer a midfielder or the small back pockets for this role, freeing the (typically taller) full-back player to attempt to mark the kick-in.

Notable full-backs:

- George 'Jocka' Todd
- Jack Regan
- Vic Thorp
- Fred Baring
- Fred Hughson
- Stephen Silvagni
- Chris Langford
- Geoff Southby
- David Dench
- Kelvin Moore
- Gary Malarkey
- Rod Carter
- Gary Pert
- Michael Brennan
- Ashley McIntosh
- Darren Gaspar
- Ben Rutten
- Simon Prestigiacomo
- Darren Glass
- Brian Lake
- Matthew Scarlett
- Dustin Fletcher
- Mal Michael
- Mick Martyn
- Shane Wakelin
- Tom Jonas
- Alex Rance
- Harris Andrews
- Tom Lonergan
- Harris Andrews
- Jacob Weitering

=== Back pocket ===
The back pocket refers to a position on the field deep in defence.

Back pocket players need to have good spoiling skills and usually, quality back-pockets are noted for their hardness. Back pockets generally play on the smaller, faster forward pockets and let the fullback play on the stronger full-forward.

Some back-pockets are small, fast players, whose role is to clear a loose ball from defence or play on a forward of similar size and speed. Others are 'mid-sized' defenders, with enough height and strength to contest or spoil marks and enough mobility to fulfil the first role.

Back pocket is not an exclusive position. Tall defenders (i.e. full-back/centre half-back) may play in the back pocket to match up effectively on a tall forward playing in the forward pocket.

Numerous back pocket players have gone on to coach successfully, including Kevin Sheedy, Mick Malthouse, Tom Hafey, Denis Pagan and David Parkin.

Notable back pocket players:

- Wally Donald
- Bernie Smith
- Brad Hardie
- Gary Ayres
- Charlie Sutton
- Ian Nankervis
- John Rantall
- Laurie Fowler
- Mark Browning
- Jeff Dunne
- Andrew Collins
- Glenn Archer
- James Clement
- Shane Parker
- David Wirrpanda
- Michael Green
- Chris Johnson
- Ang Christou
- Gavin Wanganeen
- Darren Milburn
- Campbell Brown
- Ben Hart
- Daniel Edwards
- Dale Morris

=== Half-back line ===
The half-back line consists of two half-back flankers and the centre half-back. The role of centre half-back has remained largely unmodified throughout the years. The centre half-back dominates play to a significant extent, and hence is considered a key position in defence.

The centre half-back is often a tall and sturdy player. Along with their half-back flankers, centre half-backs are the first line of defence, but also key players in winning the ball, leading and assisting the offense.

Centre half-backs are required to have a solid understanding of team structures, mainly the strategies used for kick-ins. They need to compete in contests, take contested marks, run off their opponent to win uncontested possessions, and force their opponents to chase.

Notable centre half-backs:

- Albert Collier
- Tom Fitzmaurice
- Wally Buttsworth
- Gordon Strang
- Bert Deacon
- Neil Roberts
- Col Austen
- Gary Hardeman
- Peter Knights
- Billy Picken
- Ross Glendinning
- Paul Roos
- Chris Mew
- Chris Grant
- Michael Sexton
- Glen Jakovich
- Sean Wellman
- Justin Leppitsch
- Trent Croad
- Josh Gibson
- Luke McPharlin
- Peter Dean

The half-back flank is very similar to the back pocket position. However, a true half-back flanker is more attacking and concentrates on rebounding the ball out of the defensive 50. Sometimes half-back flankers even forgo their defensive duties in order to be more attacking. When a half-back flanker is attacking, they play like a wing-back in soccer (or an attacking full-back), and if they are more defensive then they play like a traditional full-back in soccer.

Notable half-back flankers:

- Kevin Murray
- Bruce Doull
- Luke Hodge
- Andrew McLeod
- Trevor Barker
- Ken Fletcher
- Wayne Schimmelbusch
- Guy McKenna
- John Worsfold
- Nigel Smart
- Mark Bayes
- Mervyn Keane
- David O'Halloran
- Ken Hinkley
- Brett Lovett
- David Grant
- Dean Laidley
- Mark Bickley
- Grant Birchall
- Brett Deledio
- Shannon Hurn
- Paul Seedsman

== Forward line ==
The forward line, similarly to the back line, can either refer to the full-forward line or both the full- and half-forward lines. In modern football, there is little differentiation between the half-forward and full-forward lines, with the forward 6 being interchangeable across the entire area.

=== Full-forward ===
Full-forwards are good at one-on-one contests with the opposition and are the main target in the forward line when attacking. This means they can produce mass numbers of goals in a season or match. Contests in the goalsquare require the strength and weight to be able to jostle or wrestle opponents to front position and keep fullbacks at bay and not as much running is required as midfielders. As a result, full-forwards are typically both tall and powerfully built. A full-forward that is strongly built and specialises in charging packs is often categorised as a power forward.

As well as contesting marks with their strength, full forwards will try to run into space to shake off their defender and take an uncontested mark (this is known as "leading", "leading for the ball" or "leading into space"). This means that the full-forward needs to be fast, but only in short bursts. In modern times, some teams have experimented by playing a smaller and faster player (possibly a former forward pocket or flanker) at full-forward in order to beat the defender with speed rather than strength. In the case of Mark Williams (Hawthorn) and Brad Johnson (Western Bulldogs), this has been extremely successful.

Notable full-forwards:

- Peter Hudson
- John Coleman
- Gordon Coventry
- Jason Dunstall
- Tony Lockett
- Doug Wade
- Bob Pratt
- Jack Titus
- Jack Moriarty
- Bill Mohr
- Harry Vallence
- Dick Lee
- Ken Farmer
- George Doig
- Fred Fanning
- Peter McKenna
- Geoff Blethyn
- Alex Jesaulenko
- Michael Moncrieff
- Alastair Lynch
- Matthew Lloyd
- Tony Modra
- Saverio Rocca
- Brendan Fevola
- Lance Franklin
- Barry Hall
- Jack Riewoldt
- Joe Daniher
- Josh J. Kennedy
- Tom Hawkins
- Charlie Curnow

=== Forward pocket ===
The forward pocket is designed as either a role for a second full-forward (also known as a third key forward) or for players who are smaller but faster and more agile and capable of kicking brilliantly on the run (this is the more traditional forward pocket). Many forward pockets, like rovers, are quick thinking and opportunistic "crumbing" players. This means that they need to be short enough to pick up the ball quickly after it hits the ground from a contest, think and move quickly to evade potential tackles, and kick or set up a goal.

Like some back pockets, some forward pockets are like medium-sized full forwards—tall and strong enough to contest marks, and mobile enough to crumb the ball. Some players in this mould, such as Russell Robertson, are capable of playing full-forward outright.

Crumbing forward pockets do not exclusively crumb the ball. Sometimes, they lead for the ball like full forwards, so they have to be competent at marking the ball. Some forward pockets can even jump so high that they can contest marks, despite their lack of height.

Notable forward pocket players:

- Jeff Farmer
- Silvio Foschini
- Vin Catoggio
- Peter Daicos
- Norm Goss
- Brad Johnson
- Brad Hardie
- Leon Davis
- Angus Monfries
- Phillip Matera
- Cyril Rioli
- Eddie Betts
- Brett Ebert
- Charlie Cameron
- Stephen Milne
- Mark LeCras
- Hayden Ballantyne
- Michael Walters

=== Centre half-forward ===
The centre half-forward's role is usually the most demanding of any player on field; requiring a tall frame, good marking skills, strength and most importantly, athleticism, being required.

A centre half-forward who is strongly built and specialises in charging packs is often categorised as a power forward.

Notable centre half-forwards:

- Wayne Carey
- Royce Hart
- Albert Thurgood
- Barrie Robran
- Bernie Quinlan
- Ted Whitten
- Darrel Baldock
- Dermott Brereton
- Stephen Kernahan
- Garry Lyon
- Terry Daniher
- Ivor Warne-Smith
- Laurie Nash
- Ken Hands
- Fred Flanagan
- Horrie Clover
- Ken Fraser
- Nick Riewoldt
- Matthew Pavlich
- Warren Tredrea
- Graham Cornes
- Kelvin Templeton
- Jonathan Brown
- Matthew Richardson
- Jarryd Roughead
- Travis Cloke
- Taylor Walker

=== Half-forward flank ===
Standing wide of the centre half-forward, the half-forward flankers provide an alternate target for balls coming from the midfield.

Half-forward flankers usually move the ball into the forward line along the flanks. They might kick the ball into the forward line, pass the ball to another running player, or have a shot at goal themselves. These days half-forward flankers usually push into the midfield and, rather than being a specialist position, half-forward flank can be played by centres, wingers, rovers/ruck-rovers, or even attacking half-back flankers. The term "high half-forward" has recently been used to describe a mid-sized forward who plays as a connector between the midfield and defence, not close to goal.

Notable half-forward flankers:

- Gary Ablett Sr
- Darren Jarman
- Alex Jesaulenko
- Malcolm Blight
- Gary Buckenara
- Peter Daicos
- Wayne Johnston
- Michael Turner
- Roger Dean
- Graham Arthur
- Paul Hudson
- James Hird
- Jason Akermanis
- Nicky Winmar
- Phil Krakouer
- Mick Conlan
- Mark Mercuri
- Nathan Brown
- Brad Johnson
- Stevie Johnson

== Followers ==
The followers are three different roles, the "ruck", "rover" and "ruck-rover".

Also known as the on-ball division, the followers consist of three players: a ruck, a ruck-rover and a rover. They are known as followers because they have traditionally been used as players that follow the ball all around the ground as opposed to playing in a set position. With modern Australian rules football there is a decreased emphasis on set positions, but followers generally cover much more ground than other players on the field.

Ruck—their role is to contest with the opposing ruck at centre bounces which take place at the start of each quarter or after each goal and also at stoppages (i.e., boundary throw-ins, ball-ups). The ruck usually uses their height (typically rucks are much taller than average) to palm or tap the ball down so that a ruck-rover or rover can run onto it—similar to an NBA centre at the tip-off. Historically, it was more common to punch the ball, but the advent of Graham "Polly" Farmer popularised a more precise level of directional tapping. Traditionally, rucks have simply been tall players with limited skill and speed, whose only job was to provide a contest in the ruck. In recent times, however, rucks have become faster and more skilled, so they can play as an extra midfielder in between ruck contests.

The tallest AFL players ever are rucks Mason Cox (Fremantle), Aaron Sandilands (Fremantle), Peter Street (Western Bulldogs) and Ned Reeves (Hawthorn), all of whom measure 2.11 metres (6 ft 11 in). Before them the record was held by Matthew "Spider" Burton (Fremantle and North Melbourne) at 2.10 metres (6 ft 11 in). Gold Coast's Jarrod Witts also stands at 2.10 metres (6 ft 11 in).

Notable Rucks:

- Syd Coventry
- Jack Dyer
- Roy Cazaly
- Vic Cumberland
- Percy Bentley
- Roy Wright
- Alan Gale
- Jack Clarke
- Denis Cordner
- Polly Farmer
- Sam Newman
- Carl Ditterich
- John Nicholls
- John Schultz
- Noel Teasdale
- Mike Pyke
- Len Thompson
- Gary Dempsey
- Don Scott
- Stephen Michael
- Rick Davies
- Graham Moss
- Peter Moore
- Barry Round
- Simon Madden
- Peter Carey
- Jim Stynes
- Shaun Rehn
- Greg Stafford
- Scott Wynd
- Jeff White
- Paul Salmon
- Brad Ottens
- Peter Everitt
- Dean Cox
- Aaron Sandilands
- Max Gawn
- Todd Goldstein

Ruck-rover—their role is to be directly beneath the flight of the ball when a ruck taps the ball down, allowing an easy take away, or clearance, from a stoppage. Typically, players are not as tall as the ruck.

Rover—their role is to lurk around centre bounces and stoppages to receive the ball from a ruck or ruck-rover and complete a clearance. Rovers are typically the smallest player on the ground. In modern football, the rover, ruck-rover, centre and wingers are often grouped together as midfielders.

The traditional ruck-rover and rover positions are an anachronism in today's game. Along with the centre line players, the ruck-rover and rover form the midfield.

== Midfield ==
The traditional centreline consists of the centre and the wingmen. These three players are usually good at winning the ball and running with it. They help turn defence into attack and set up attacking plays. As their main role is to deliver the ball to the forwards, they are sometimes called link men.

Physically, centre line players need to have turning agility, above-average ability to read the play and, as they are involved in both attack and defence, stamina and teamwork. Furthermore, they must possess kicking or handball skills, preferably on both sides of the body.

The centreline and on-ballers form what is known as the midfield. Midfielders are generally separated into two categories: inside midfielders and outside midfielders. The inside midfielders' main responsibility is to win the ball from the stoppages and feed it out to the outside midfielders, who are generally the quicker, more elusive players.

Notable midfielders:

- Haydn Bunton
- Jack Worrall
- Allan La Fontaine
- Dick Reynolds
- Thorold Merrett
- Stan Heal
- Les Foote
- Bill Hutchison
- Bob Quinn
- Des Fothergill
- Allan Hopkins
- Allan Ruthven
- Allen Aylett
- Bob Hank
- Herbie Matthews
- Marcus Whelan
- Ron Barassi
- Jack Clarke
- Bob Skilton
- Bob Rose
- Ian Stewart
- Des Tuddenham
- John Murphy
- Barry Cable
- Kevin Bartlett
- Peter Bedford
- Leigh Matthews
- Garry Wilson
- Keith Greig
- Robert Flower
- Maurice Rioli
- Wayne Schimmelbusch
- Michael Tuck
- Gerard Healy
- Tim Watson
- Dale Weightman
- Jim Krakouer
- John Platten
- Craig Bradley
- Greg Williams
- Gavin Brown
- Garry Hocking
- Chris McDermott
- Tony McGuinness
- Peter Matera
- Paul Kelly
- Anthony Stevens
- Robert Harvey
- Michael Voss
- Mark Ricciuto
- Nathan Buckley
- Shane Crawford
- Scott West
- Simon Black
- Daniel Kerr
- Nigel Lappin
- Gary Ablett, Jr.
- Chris Judd
- Luke Hodge
- Sam Mitchell
- Jimmy Bartel
- Dane Swan
- Brent Harvey
- Scott Pendlebury
- Jobe Watson
- Joel Selwood
- Patrick Dangerfield
- Ben Cousins
- Nathan Fyfe
- Dustin Martin
- Trent Cotchin
- Josh P. Kennedy
- Lachie Neale
- Patrick Cripps

== Taggers ==
Taggers, also known as run-with players or stoppers, mark the opposition's best player (often a midfielder, although sometimes a half-back) and restrict their impact on the game. Good taggers must be fit, disciplined and focused. They must be strong enough to keep their position in stoppages and contested play (without conceding free kicks), yet fast enough to match their opponent's spread. Notable taggers include Ryan Crowley, Steven Baker, Brett Kirk, Cameron Ling, Kane Cornes, Ben Jacobs, Brady Rawlings, Shane Heard, Matt de Boer and Finn Maginness.

== Interchange bench ==
Players named as the interchange, also often known as the "bench", are not permitted to enter the field of play unless substituting for a player during the game. Currently at the professional level, five players can be named on the bench; this number has steadily increased from a single player in the 1930s. Representative teams (such as State of Origin teams or honorific teams such as the AFL Team of the Century), practise and exhibition matches often feature an extended interchange bench of up to six or eight players.

Until the 1940s, the single interchange player, known as the "nineteenth man" or the "reserve" acted only as a substitution for an injured or out-of-form player; the player substituted out of the game could take no further part. A second "twentieth man" was introduced in the VFL in 1946. Since the late 1970s, the substitute was changed to unlimited interchange, and has slowly increased from two to the current five players. Whilst substitutions could have been made as often as the coach wishes, until the 2000s, players were not mainly interchanged for injuries, tactical changes or as punishment ("dragging the player off"). Since the 2000s, the players began to be regularly moved onto and off from the ground for several rests during the game. A cap on the number of interchanges allowed was introduced.

The five players named on the interchange bench in the teamsheet (which is submitted ninety minutes before the commencement of the game) must actually start on the bench; however, they may be substituted immediately if the coach wishes.

=== Substitute ===
From 2011 until 2015, the AFL level interchange rules provided that each team was permitted three interchange players (instead of four) and one substitute player.

The substitute sat on the bench and began the game wearing a green vest over his playing guernsey. He was not permitted to enter the field of play, nor be interchanged while wearing the green vest. At any time during the game, he could be substituted for one of the other players in the team—either on the ground or on the bench. He took off his green vest, and the player he substituted put on a red vest. The player in the red vest could take no further part in the game. Teams were limited to a single substitution per game. Players were substituted for tactical reasons or to replace an injured player.

At the start of the 2016 season, the substitute rule was removed, returning to four available interchange players.

The substitute returned in the 2021 season, but was only available to replace an injured player, with the regular sub (to be used for any reason) returning for the 2023 season. In 2026, the substitute rule was abolished again, and converted to a fifth interchange player able to be freely used.

== Utility players ==
There are very few players in the AFL league who possess the skill and poise to be able to consistently perform to a very high standard in many different positions. Some of these players do not receive the recognition they deserve, while others, such as Matthew Pavlich, Jimmy Bartel, and Adam Goodes, are praised for their versatility and ability to influence a game from any position.

Traditionally, a utility player is an unheralded but nonetheless important player. He does not dominate one position, instead he is like a "spare parts" player because he can fill in at a variety of positions and do a good job in each.

Nowadays, the need for more versatility in players has resulted in many players "doubling up" their roles. Practically every midfielder can play forward pocket, back pocket, half-forward flank or half-back flank. Most, if not all, starting ruckmen can play as tall forwards, or in rarer cases, tall defenders. Some tall defenders can play as rucks, tall forwards and vice versa. This means that most AFL players have a specialist position and one or two "fill-in" positions.

One exception to this would be a player who is actually a specialist at two positions, not just a fill-in (i.e. Adam Hunter, a notable centre half-back, was also one of their most dominant full-forwards). Another exception would be midfielders, such as James Hird and Anthony Koutoufides, who had the height and strength to play key positions during their respective careers; this requires an extremely rare blend of skills and abilities.

Below are a number of players who are notable for their ability to dominate various positions.

Notable players:

- Adam Goodes: centre half-back, ruck, centre, half-forward
- Bernie Quinlan: ruck-rover, centre half-forward, full-forward
- Malcolm Blight: ruck-rover, wing, half-forward flank, full-forward
- Barrie Robran: centre, ruck-rover, centre half-back, centre half-forward, full-forward
- Alex Jesaulenko: centre, ruck-rover, half-back flank, half-forward flank, full-forward
- Gary Ablett Sr.: wing, half-forward flank, half-back flank, forward pocket, full-forward
- Peter Knights: centre half-back, half-back flank, centre half-forward, half-forward flank, full-forward
- Phil Carman: centre, ruck-rover, centre half-forward, half-forward flank, full-forward
- Francis Bourke: wing, half-back flank, full-Back, full-forward
- Brent Crosswell: centre, ruck-rover, half-forward flank, centre half-forward, centre half-back, half-back flank
- Terry Daniher: full-forward, centre half-forward, half-forward flank, half-back flank, centre half-back, full-back
- Neale Daniher: full-forward, centre half-forward, half-forward flank, half-back flank, centre half-back, ruck-rover
- Anthony Koutoufides: wing, centre, ruck, ruck-rover, rover, centre half-back, centre half-forward, full-forward
- Matthew Pavlich: centre half-forward, centre, full-forward, centre half-back, fullback
- Luke Hodge: centre, ruck-rover, half-back flank, back pocket, wing, half-forward flank
- James Hird: forward pocket, half-forward flank, wing, rover, half-back, centre half-back, centre half-forward
- Chad Cornes: centre half-back, half-forward flank, centre, wing, ruck-rover, back pocket, tagger
- Matthew Richardson: centre half-forward, full-forward, wing
- Brendon Goddard: half-back flank, centre half-forward, wing, half-forward flank, forward pocket, back pocket, full-forward, centre half-back, centre
- Shane Edwards: centre, ruck-rover, half-forward, half-back
- Mark Blicavs: half-back flank, full back, centre half-back, ruck, centre, ruck-rover, wing

== Alternate position and grouping names ==
Alternative name	Positions	Notes
Key defenders or tall defenders	Full-back, centre half-back	
Rucks, on-ballers, on-ball division on-ball brigade	Ruckman, ruck-rover, rover	See Followers above
Centreline	Wingers, centre	Term nowadays obsolete, positions considered part of the Midfield
Big men	Ruckmen	(see "tall timber", below)
Key forwards or tall forwards	Centre half-forward, full-forward	
Tall timber	Ruckmen, centre half-forward, full-forward, full-back, centre half-back	This is a slang term, but it refers to all the players whose height may be more important than their speed
Crumber, small forward	Forward pocket	Any small, fast forward may sometimes called a "crumber" or "small forward"
Resting ruckman	Ruckmen	A ruckman playing in the forward line between stints in the ruck is a "resting ruckman" (as in, he's taking a rest from ruck duties by playing up forward). Traditionally, as ruckmen could not be taken off (as they could not come back on), they may have rested in the back pocket instead.
Rotating defender	Midfielder, defender	Midfielders and defenders who rotate through each other's positions. Often sees midfielders move to defence and play as creative defenders.
Rebounder, mop-up player	Back pocket, half-back flank	A back pocket or half-back flanker whose main job is to rebound the ball out of defence may be called a "rebounder" or "mop-up player". A player who is good at setting up attacks from defence, due to their quality ball skills and decision-making abilities, may be referred to as a quarterback (referring to American football).
Key-position player	Full-back, centre half-back, centre half-forward, full-forward	Used to describe any of the taller forwards or defenders
Swingman or swing-men	Utility player	Typically used to describe a utility player who is a specialist at two or more positions.

== See also ==
- List of Australian Rules footballers
- Flooding
- Captain (Australian rules football)

== Sources ==
- AFL "Guide to Season 2005" (2004) p. 493

== Bibliography ==
- McLeod, Andrew; Jaques, Trevor (2006). Australian football : steps to success (2nd ed.). Human Kinetics. ISBN 0-7360-6005-7.
- Pascoe, Robert (1995). The winter game : the complete history of Australian football. Port Melbourne: The Text Publishing Company. ISBN 978-0-85561-644-1.
