= Doug Smith (footballer, born 1957) =

Australian rules footballer

Personal information
- Full name: Doug M. Smith
- Born: 20 December 1957 (age 68)
- Original team: Tallangatta
- Height: 193 cm (6 ft 4 in)
- Weight: 86 kg (190 lb)

Playing career^{1}
Years	Club	Games (Goals)
1978–1983	North Melbourne	54 (17)
- ^{1} Playing statistics correct to the end of 1983.

Doug Smith (born 20 December 1957) is a former Australian rules footballer who played with North Melbourne in the Victorian Football League (VFL).

Smith played as a reserve in the 1978 VFL Grand Final loss to Hawthorn, in his first season and seventh league game. A key position player, he was used as a forward and kicked two goals from 11 kicks.

Originally from Tallangatta, Smith had his most productive period from 1980 to 1982 when he put together 42 games.
