= Maurice Boyse =

Australian rules footballer

Personal information
- Full name: Maurice Boyse
- Born: 3 July 1955 (age 71)
- Original team: Airport West (EDFL)
- Height: 183 cm (6 ft 0 in)
- Weight: 78 kg (172 lb)

Playing career^{1}
Years	Club	Games (Goals)
1975	Essendon	9 (1)
1977–1981	North Melbourne	50 (50)
1981, 1983	South Melbourne	16 (16)
Total		75 (67)
- ^{1} Playing statistics correct to the end of 1983.

Maurice Boyse (born 3 July 1955) is a former Australian rules footballer who played with Essendon, North Melbourne and South Melbourne in the Victorian Football League (VFL).

Before making it into the VFL, Boyse had played at local club Airport West and made his way through Essendon's Under-19s. He played nine times for Essendon in the 1975 VFL season and then had to wait almost two years for another senior game, this time at North Melbourne.

In 1978 he averaged 17 disposals a game after coming into the side in round 11 and played all of the remaining 15 matches in the season. This included the 1978 VFL Grand Final, where he lined up on a half forward flank and kicked two goals. Boyse, who also played on the wing, appeared in three further finals in 1979.

Early in the 1981 season, Boyse was traded to South Melbourne in a three-way deal which also included Central District. For losing Boyse, North Melbourne received Peter Jonas and Central District got the services of South Melbourne player Michael Wright.
