= Kelvin Moore =

Australian rules footballer (born 1950)

Personal information
- Full name: Kelvin David Moore
- Born: 15 August 1950 (age 76); Frankston, Victoria
- Original teams: Frankston Peninsula, Pearcedale
- Height: 188 cm (6 ft 2 in)
- Weight: 86 kg (190 lb)
- Position: Full back

Playing career^{1}
Years	Club	Games (Goals)
1970–1984	Hawthorn	300 (21)
1985-1986	Frankston	25 (39)
Total		325 (60)
- ^{1} Playing statistics correct to the end of 1984.

Career highlights
- 3× VFL premiership player: 1971, 1976, 1978; Peter Crimmins Perpetual Memorial Trophy: 1979; All-Australian team: 1979; Australian Football Hall of Fame; Hawthorn Hall of Fame; Hawthorn Team of the Century

Kelvin David Moore (born 15 August 1950) is a former Australian rules footballer who played for the Hawthorn Football Club in the Victorian Football League (VFL).

Moore was one of the best full-backs of his era and played in three Hawthorn premierships during his 300-game career between 1970 and 1984.

In 2005, Moore was inducted into the Australian Football Hall of Fame. He won the club's best and fairest award in 1979, was named at full-back in the Hawthorn Team of the Twentieth Century and was an inaugural member of the Hawthorn's Hall of Fame. He was considered unlucky by many not to be selected at full-back in the AFL Team of the Century.

After retiring from the VFL, he played for the Frankston Football Club in the Victorian Football Association (VFA), often as a half-forward. He was later a chairman of selectors for Frankston, St Kilda and Hawthorn, a Hawthorn board member, and an assistant coach for Hawthorn under Peter Schwab.

== Honours and achievements ==
Hawthorn

- 3× VFL premiership player: 1971, 1976, 1978
- 2× Minor premiership: 1971, 1975

Individual

- All-Australian team: 1979
- Peter Crimmins Perpetual Memorial Trophy: 1979
- Australian Football Hall of Fame
- Hawthorn Hall of Fame
- Hawthorn Team of the Century
- Hawthorn life member
