= 1976 Brownlow Medal =

- Winner: Graham Moss (Essendon); 48 votes

Television/radio coverage
- Network: Seven Network

The 1976 Brownlow Medal was the 49th year the award was presented to the player adjudged the fairest and best player during the Victorian Football League (VFL) home and away season. Graham Moss of the Essendon Football Club won the medal by polling forty-eight votes during the 1976 VFL season. The count was the first of two occasions in which the two field umpires independently voted for the best players on the ground under the 3-2-1 system. This meant that the winner of the Brownlow had a higher number of votes than usual. From 1978 onwards, the field umpires conferred after each game and awarded a single set of votes, rather than voting independently.

== Leading vote-getters ==
	Player	Votes
1st	Graham Moss (Essendon)	48
2nd	Peter Knights (Hawthorn)	45
3rd	Francis Bourke (Richmond)	36
=4th	Gary Dempsey (Footscray)	28
=4th	Greg Wells (Melbourne)	28
=4th	Barry Cable (North Melbourne)	28
=7th	Ron Alexander (Fitzroy)	26
=7th	Bruce Nankervis (Geelong)	26
9th	Garry Wilson (Fitzroy)	24
=10th	Robert Neal (Geelong); Leigh Matthews (Hawthorn)	23
