= Peter Murnane =

Australian rules footballer

Personal information
- Born: 5 February 1955 (age 71)
- Original team: De La Salle
- Height: 180 cm (5 ft 11 in)
- Weight: 78 kg (172 lb)

Playing career^{1}
| Years | Club | Games (Goals) |
| 1976–1981 | Hawthorn | 80 (56) |
- ^{1} Playing statistics correct to the end of 1981.

Peter Murnane (born 5 February 1955) is a former Australian rules footballer who played with Hawthorn in the VFL.

Murnane played mostly as a wingman and half forward and was a two-time premiership winner at Hawthorn, the first in his debut season. Recruited from De La Salle, he spent six seasons with Hawthorn and managed 80 games.

A handy left footer on the wing or half forward he was known for his accurate kicking. His 8th senior game was the 1976 VFL Grand Final. After the 1981 VFL season Murnane requested a transfer to West Perth in the WAFL. He went on to give the Falcons good service in playing 36 games and kicking 40 goals between 1982 and 1987.
