= Ron Grove =

Australian rules footballer

Personal information
- Full name: Ron Grove
- Born: 5 June 1919
- Died: 8 January 1993 (aged 73)
- Original team: Golden Point (Ballarat FL)
- Height: 185 cm (6 ft 1 in)
- Weight: 94 kg (207 lb)

Playing career^{1}
Years	Club	Games (Goals)
1941	Geelong	10 (3)
1942–1947	Footscray	72 (54)
Total		82 (57)
- ^{1} Playing statistics correct to the end of 1947.

Ron Grove (5 June 1919 – 8 January 1993) was an Australian rules footballer who played with Geelong and Footscray. Ron played in a number of positions throughout his career, although undoubtedly his best moment was in a 1946 game against Melbourne in which he kicked 10 goals. He started his career in 1941 playing for Geelong, although after receiving limited opportunity he moved to Footscray for the next season.
