= Richard H. Walter =

American politician

Member of the Iowa House of Representatives
- In office 1969–1971

Personal details
- Born: June 19, 1920 Council Bluffs, Iowa, United States
- Died: October 15, 2016 (aged 96)
- Party: Republican
- Occupation: businessman

Richard Harvey Walter (June 19, 1920 – October 15, 2016) was an American politician in the state of Iowa. Walter was born in Council Bluffs, Iowa. He attended Omaha University and was a businessman. He served in the Iowa House of Representatives from 1969 to 1971 as a Republican.
