= Rick Walters =

Rick Walters may refer to:

- Slick Rick (born 1965), British-American rapper
- Rick Walters (Canadian football) (born 1971), slotback in the Canadian Football League
- Rick Walters (tattoo artist) (born 1945), American tattoo artist
