= Chris Smith (Australian footballer) =

Australian rules footballer

Personal information
- Born: 29 September 1955 (age 71)
- Original team: Beverley Hills
- Debut: Rd 6, 1973, Fitzroy vs. Hawthorn, at Junction Oval

Playing career^{1}
Years	Club	Games (Goals)
1973–1982	Fitzroy	163 (58)
- ^{1} Playing statistics correct to the end of 1982.

Chris Smith (born 29 September 1955) is a former Australian rules footballer who played for the Fitzroy Football Club in the Victorian Football League (VFL) between 1973 and 1982.

Primarily playing as a centre half-back, Smith was notable for playing for most of his career in a helmet, after suffering migraines after being knocked out three times in his first three years.
