= Don Scott (footballer, born 1947) =

Australian rules footballer

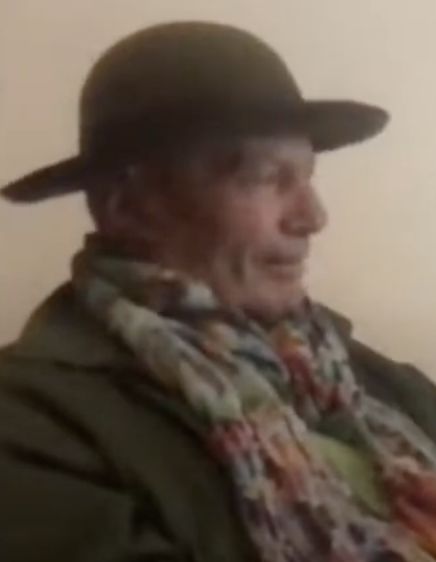
- Scott in October 2021

Personal information
- Full name: Don W. Scott
- Born: 20 December 1947 (age 78)
- Original team: Box Hill (VFA)
- Height: 190 cm (6 ft 3 in)
- Weight: 89 kg (14 st 0 lb; 196 lb)
- Position: Ruckman

Playing career^{1}
Years	Club	Games (Goals)
1967–1981	Hawthorn	302 (133)

Representative team honours
Years	Team	Games (Goals)
	Victoria	4

Coaching career
Years	Club	Games (W–L–D)
1985	South Adelaide	6 (0–6–0)
- ^{1} Playing statistics correct to the end of 1981.

Career highlights
- 3× VFL premiership player: 1971, 1976, 1978; 2× VFL premiership captain: 1976, 1978; Hawthorn captain: 1976–1980; J.J. Dennis Memorial Trophy: 1973; Hawthorn Team of the Century – Ruck; Australian Football Hall of Fame; Hawthorn Hall of Fame – Legend status

Don W. Scott (born 20 December 1947) is a former Australian rules footballer who played for Hawthorn in the Victorian Football League (VFL) between 1967 and 1981.

Over his 302-game VFL career, Scott built a reputation as an aggressive ruckman and a team enforcer. As captain, he led the Hawks to two premierships and won a total of three premierships with the club, as well as the 1973 best and fairest award.

== Early career ==
If Scott had not become a footballer, he very well might have become a champion horse rider. His father Doug was a schoolteacher and his grandfather was an avid horseman. At 16 years of age he won a jumping and riding prize at the Royal Melbourne Show on a horse he had trained himself. Throughout his football career and afterwards, Scott continued to be heavily involved in the equine industry, whether it was horse-rearing, merchandising equine products, or competing in showjumping.

Scott was educated at Blackburn High School.

Because of his aggressive style of play, Scott was a frequent visitor to the tribunal, whether he was the purported instigator or the victim; he was reported 15 times but only suspended for a total of 11 matches.

== Life after football and Operation Payback ==
In 1985, Scott took up the position of head coach at South Adelaide in the South Australian National Football League (SANFL). However, the playing group could not adapt to Scott's tough style of coaching and he quit after just six games in charge, all of them defeats.

After returning to Melbourne, Scott was recruited by television station Channel 7 to be an expert commentator for their VFL telecasts, including providing special comments during a number of Grand Finals.

In 1996, Scott was the founder of the "Operation Payback" campaign, which was ultimately successful in its efforts to prevent Hawthorn from merging with another AFL club, Melbourne. Scott rallied many supporters and former Hawthorn players in opposition to the proposed Melbourne Hawks formation.

From 1996–2003, Scott was a director of the Hawthorn Football Club.

In 2001, Scott was inducted into the Australian Football Hall of Fame.

In 2003, Scott was inducted into the Hawthorn Football Club Hall of Fame.

In 2004 and 2005, Scott’s son Doug Scott was on the Hawthorn AFL list; however, he didn't play any senior matches.

In March 2012, it was announced that Scott had been diagnosed with an aggressive form of prostate cancer, but because he went for annual check-ups the cancer was detected early, which increased the likelihood of survival.

In August 2019, he joined a podcast with former Herald Sun Chief Football Writer Mike Sheahan and former footballer and media personality Sam Newman entitled Sam, Mike and Don, You Can Not Be Serious. The podcast airs once weekly and covers all trending topics with some AFL and sport commentary. However, upon Sheahan quitting the podcast in June 2020 due to fallout from comments he made about former AFL footballer Nicky Winmar, its name was changed to You Cannot Be Serious.

In November 2019, the Hawthorn Football Club nominated Don Scott to become an official legend of the club; however, Scott refused to accept the award.

In July 2020, Scott alleged that the Hawthorn Football Club broke salary cap rules throughout their successful 1980s dynasty utilising a secret Tasmanian bank account to retain players outside of the salary cap.

In December 2021, Don Scott finally accepted being elevated to an official legend of the Hawthorn Football Club.

In April 2022, as reported in the Herald Sun newspaper, Don Scott was appointed to the Hawthorn Football Club’s nominations committee to select the next club president to succeed Jeff Kennett.

In March 2023, Sam Newman announced on the You Cannot Be Serious podcast with Don Scott that their podcast had reached 10 million downloads on Podbean.

In October 2023, Don Scott resigned from the podcast after an on air disagreement with Sam Newman.

== Honours and achievements ==
Hawthorn

- 3× VFL premiership player: 1971, 1976, 1978
- 2× Minor premiership: 1971, 1975

Individual

- 2× VFL premiership captain: 1976, 1978
- J.J. Dennis Memorial Trophy: 1973
- Hawthorn captain: 1976–1980
- Australian Football Media Association Player of the Year: 1977
- Australian Football Hall of Fame
- Hawthorn Hall of Fame – Legend status
- Hawthorn life member
- Hawthorn Team of the Century

== Bibliography ==
- Hansen, Brian; Dyer, Jack (1994). "Don "The Toff" Scott". Captain Blood's Wild Men of Football. Vol. 2. Mount Waverley: Brian Hansen Publications.
- Holmesby, Russell; Main, Jim (2011). The Encyclopedia of AFL Footballers: Every AFL/VFL Player Since 1897 (9th ed.). Seaford: Bas Publishing.
