= Wayne Schimmelbusch =

Australian rules footballer

Personal information
- Full name: Wayne Clifford Schimmelbusch
- Nickname: Schimmel
- Born: 19 January 1953 (age 73)
- Original team: Brunswick (VFA)
- Height: 179 cm (5 ft 10 in)
- Weight: 74 kg (163 lb)
- Position: Midfielder/half back/half forward

Playing career^{1}
Years	Club	Games (Goals)
1971-1972	Brunswick	28 (65)
1973-1987	North Melbourne	306 (354)
Total		334 (419)

Coaching career
Years	Club	Games (W–L–D)
1990–1992	North Melbourne	66 (31–35–0)
- ^{1} Playing statistics correct to the end of 1987.

Career highlights
- North Melbourne captain 1979-1987; North Melbourne club leading goalkicker 1976; North Melbourne premierships 1975, 1977; Victorian representative (7 games, 12 goals)

Wayne Schimmelbusch (born 19 January 1953) is a former Australian rules footballer in the (then) Victorian Football League (VFL).

Schimmelbusch played in 306 games, including 29 finals games, for the North Melbourne Football Club, which was then a club games played record. He was recruited in 1973 from the Brunswick Football Club in the Victorian Football Association (VFA), where he won the J. J. Field Trophy as the VFA second division's best and fairest in 1972. His retirement in 1987 was forced due to a serious knee injury sustained during a match against the Sydney Swans.

Schimmelbusch was appointed coach of the North Melbourne Football Club in 1990. The team did not perform well; and, in the 1993 pre-season, after a 147-point loss to Adelaide, Schimmelbusch was sacked and replaced by Denis Pagan, who had previously coached North Melbourne's under-19 and Essendon Football Club's reserves teams.

Schimmelbusch's brother Daryl also played for the North Melbourne Football Club.

Schimmelbusch was inducted into the Australian Football Hall of Fame in 1997 and named in the North Melbourne "Team of the Century" (half-forward flank) in 2001.
