= Michael Moncrieff =

Australian rules footballer

Personal information
- Born: 19 August 1952 (age 74)
- Original team: Edithvale-Aspendale
- Height: 191 cm (6 ft 3 in)
- Weight: 85 kg (187 lb)

Playing career^{1}
Years	Club	Games (Goals)
1971–1983	Hawthorn	224 (629)
1986	Sandringham	5 (21)
Total		229 (650)
- ^{1} Playing statistics correct to the end of 1983.

Career highlights
- 2× VFL premiership player: 1976, 1978; 5× Hawthorn leading goalkicker: 1974, 1976, 1978–1980

Michael Moncrieff (born 19 August 1952) is a former Australian rules footballer who played for Hawthorn in the VFL during the 1970s and early '80s.

A tall full-forward, Moncrieff was a prolific goalkicker for Hawthorn and topped their goalkicking on five occasions. The two times that he kicked 90 or more goals in a season came in premiership years for Hawthorn, 1976 and 1978. In 1976 he managed a career-high 97 goals.

In 1977, with the return of champion Tasmanian full-forward Peter Hudson, Moncrieff moved to the backline. He returned full-forward in 1978, and in the 1978 Grand Final he kicked four goals. He represented Victoria on three occasions. He kicked 10 goals in a match three times and holds the joint Hawthorn record for most goals in a final, kicking eight in the 1978 Qualifying Final against Collingwood.

Prior to the 1984 season, Moncrieff joined St Kilda. As was permitted by the rules, Moncrieff trained and played practice matches with St Kilda during the pre-season while St Kilda and Hawthorn continued to negotiate his clearance and transfer fee; however, negotiations broke down, and a transfer fee became nearly impossible to assess when Moncrieff suffered a serious knee injury in a practice match which saw him miss fifteen months of football and ultimately retire from the VFL without playing a match for St Kilda. Following this case, the rules were amended to require a player's clearance to be finalised before he could train with his new club.

In 1986, Moncrieff played for Sandringham in the Victorian Football Association.

Off-field, Moncrieff served as president of the Victorian Football League Players' Association, and he later served as a member of the AFL Grievance Tribunal.

== Honours and achievements ==
Hawthorn

- 2× VFL premiership player: 1976, 1978
- 2× Minor premiership: 1971, 1975

Individual

- 5× Hawthorn leading goalkicker: 1974, 1976, 1978, 1979, 1980
- Hawthorn life member
