= 1980 VFL season =

84th season of the Victorian Football League (VFL)

1980 VFL premiership season
- Teams: 12
- Premiers: Richmond; 10th premiership
- Minor premiers: Geelong; 10th minor premiership
- Night series: North Melbourne; 1st Night series win
- Brownlow Medallist: Kelvin Templeton (Footscray)
- Coleman Medallist: Michael Roach (Richmond)

Attendance
- Matches played: 138
- Total attendance: 3,770,917 (27,325 per match)
- Highest: 113,461

The 1980 VFL season was the 84th season of the Victorian Football League (VFL), the highest level senior Australian rules football competition in Victoria. The season featured twelve clubs, ran from 29 March until 27 September, and comprised a 22-game home-and-away season followed by a finals series featuring the top five clubs.

The premiership was won by the Richmond Football Club for the tenth time, after it defeated Collingwood by 81 points in the 1980 VFL Grand Final.

== Night series ==
North Melbourne defeated Collingwood 8.9 (57) to 7.12 (54) in the final.

== Home-and-away season ==
=== Round 1 ===
Home team	Home team score	Away team	Away team score	Venue	Crowd	Date
Hawthorn	15.16 (106)	Richmond	16.15 (111)	Princes Park	21,028	29 March 1980
Geelong	12.13 (85)	South Melbourne	13.10 (88)	Kardinia Park	22,685	29 March 1980
Essendon	12.15 (87)	North Melbourne	15.10 (100)	Windy Hill	28,811	29 March 1980
Footscray	17.11 (113)	Fitzroy	18.17 (125)	Western Oval	20,060	29 March 1980
Collingwood	13.16 (94)	Carlton	19.18 (132)	Victoria Park	29,587	29 March 1980
St Kilda	14.16 (100)	Melbourne	18.14 (122)	VFL Park	31,859	29 March 1980

=== Round 2 ===
Home team	Home team score	Away team	Away team score	Venue	Crowd	Date
Richmond	17.15 (117)	Essendon	17.22 (124)	MCG	51,548	5 April 1980
North Melbourne	7.14 (56)	Collingwood	7.19 (61)	Arden Street Oval	24,363	5 April 1980
St Kilda	11.17 (83)	Hawthorn	15.26 (116)	Moorabbin Oval	22,265	5 April 1980
Fitzroy	17.14 (116)	Melbourne	22.8 (140)	VFL Park	28,802	7 April 1980
Carlton	14.25 (109)	Geelong	15.14 (104)	Princes Park	32,614	7 April 1980
South Melbourne	14.17 (101)	Footscray	10.13 (73)	Lake Oval	19,191	7 April 1980

=== Round 3 ===
Home team	Home team score	Away team	Away team score	Venue	Crowd	Date
Richmond	18.20 (128)	St Kilda	19.14 (128)	MCG	37,076	12 April 1980
Geelong	17.17 (119)	Melbourne	14.9 (93)	Kardinia Park	21,504	12 April 1980
Fitzroy	14.18 (102)	North Melbourne	21.22 (148)	Junction Oval	14,548	12 April 1980
Hawthorn	19.16 (130)	Collingwood	16.23 (119)	Princes Park	27,034	12 April 1980
Footscray	14.10 (94)	Carlton	17.17 (119)	Western Oval	21,434	12 April 1980
South Melbourne	14.17 (101)	Essendon	24.12 (156)	VFL Park	33,909	12 April 1980

=== Round 4 ===
Home team	Home team score	Away team	Away team score	Venue	Crowd	Date
Collingwood	8.9 (57)	Richmond	16.13 (109)	Victoria Park	29,888	19 April 1980
Carlton	22.18 (150)	South Melbourne	13.15 (93)	Princes Park	20,794	19 April 1980
North Melbourne	10.9 (69)	Geelong	16.10 (106)	Arden Street Oval	15,437	19 April 1980
Melbourne	18.21 (129)	Footscray	18.12 (120)	MCG	20,905	19 April 1980
St Kilda	11.17 (83)	Essendon	12.8 (80)	Moorabbin Oval	30,947	19 April 1980
Fitzroy	12.10 (82)	Hawthorn	11.19 (85)	VFL Park	26,104	19 April 1980

=== Round 5 ===
Home team	Home team score	Away team	Away team score	Venue	Crowd	Date
Geelong	14.10 (94)	Hawthorn	13.11 (89)	Kardinia Park	34,256	25 April 1980
Richmond	29.25 (199)	Fitzroy	11.15 (81)	MCG	44,401	25 April 1980
Carlton	14.19 (103)	Melbourne	9.20 (74)	VFL Park	60,784	25 April 1980
South Melbourne	17.20 (122)	St Kilda	7.15 (57)	Lake Oval	23,003	26 April 1980
Essendon	9.15 (69)	Collingwood	10.13 (73)	Windy Hill	32,140	26 April 1980
Footscray	8.7 (55)	North Melbourne	26.21 (177)	SCG	13,476	27 April 1980

=== Round 6 ===
Home team	Home team score	Away team	Away team score	Venue	Crowd	Date
Melbourne	15.14 (104)	South Melbourne	19.16 (130)	MCG	22,487	3 May 1980
Collingwood	26.12 (168)	St Kilda	16.12 (108)	Victoria Park	29,094	3 May 1980
Hawthorn	19.16 (130)	Footscray	18.5 (113)	Princes Park	11,958	3 May 1980
Fitzroy	16.12 (108)	Essendon	15.23 (113)	Junction Oval	17,562	3 May 1980
North Melbourne	18.11 (119)	Carlton	12.15 (87)	Arden Street Oval	24,644	3 May 1980
Geelong	10.17 (77)	Richmond	12.16 (88)	VFL Park	47,265	3 May 1980

=== Round 7 ===
Home team	Home team score	Away team	Away team score	Venue	Crowd	Date
Footscray	10.10 (70)	Richmond	27.18 (180)	Western Oval	16,471	10 May 1980
Essendon	13.15 (93)	Geelong	16.11 (107)	Windy Hill	23,993	10 May 1980
Carlton	14.27 (111)	Hawthorn	16.17 (113)	Princes Park	26,414	10 May 1980
St Kilda	12.20 (92)	Fitzroy	18.23 (131)	Moorabbin Oval	17,557	10 May 1980
South Melbourne	17.13 (115)	Collingwood	13.12 (90)	Lake Oval	22,375	10 May 1980
Melbourne	10.12 (72)	North Melbourne	24.15 (159)	VFL Park	18,939	10 May 1980

=== Round 8 ===
Home team	Home team score	Away team	Away team score	Venue	Crowd	Date
North Melbourne	15.19 (109)	South Melbourne	16.10 (106)	Arden Street Oval	17,190	17 May 1980
Hawthorn	17.16 (118)	Melbourne	15.18 (108)	Princes Park	10,504	17 May 1980
Geelong	20.15 (135)	St Kilda	10.12 (72)	Kardinia Park	22,449	17 May 1980
Fitzroy	17.16 (118)	Collingwood	17.16 (118)	Junction Oval	20,596	17 May 1980
Richmond	19.24 (138)	Carlton	12.13 (85)	MCG	85,659	17 May 1980
Footscray	10.11 (71)	Essendon	22.16 (148)	VFL Park	21,851	17 May 1980

=== Round 9 ===
Home team	Home team score	Away team	Away team score	Venue	Crowd	Date
Melbourne	15.12 (102)	Richmond	29.21 (195)	MCG	27,217	24 May 1980
Fitzroy	14.16 (100)	South Melbourne	16.25 (121)	Junction Oval	14,665	24 May 1980
Collingwood	18.28 (136)	Geelong	15.15 (105)	Victoria Park	30,157	24 May 1980
St Kilda	19.15 (129)	Footscray	15.13 (103)	Moorabbin Oval	15,207	24 May 1980
North Melbourne	14.9 (93)	Hawthorn	13.10 (88)	VFL Park	34,384	24 May 1980
Essendon	13.16 (94)	Carlton	20.11 (131)	SCG	24,545	25 May 1980

=== Round 10 ===
Home team	Home team score	Away team	Away team score	Venue	Crowd	Date
Essendon	17.18 (120)	Melbourne	11.10 (76)	Windy Hill	16,504	31 May 1980
Richmond	15.15 (105)	North Melbourne	13.20 (98)	MCG	61,769	31 May 1980
South Melbourne	28.15 (183)	Hawthorn	14.15 (99)	Lake Oval	17,420	31 May 1980
Geelong	18.15 (123)	Fitzroy	17.6 (108)	Kardinia Park	19,581	31 May 1980
Footscray	18.11 (119)	Collingwood	24.17 (161)	Western Oval	21,482	31 May 1980
Carlton	14.20 (104)	St Kilda	9.8 (62)	VFL Park	37,594	31 May 1980

=== Round 11 ===
Home team	Home team score	Away team	Away team score	Venue	Crowd	Date
Footscray	15.13 (103)	Geelong	22.12 (144)	Western Oval	15,519	7 June 1980
Collingwood	19.15 (129)	Melbourne	18.11 (119)	Victoria Park	23,040	7 June 1980
St Kilda	12.8 (80)	North Melbourne	25.13 (163)	Moorabbin Oval	16,506	7 June 1980
Hawthorn	9.17 (71)	Essendon	13.11 (89)	Princes Park	21,223	7 June 1980
Fitzroy	19.12 (126)	Carlton	22.24 (156)	Junction Oval	15,286	7 June 1980
Richmond	18.13 (121)	South Melbourne	10.8 (68)	VFL Park	50,017	7 June 1980

=== Round 12 ===
Home team	Home team score	Away team	Away team score	Venue	Crowd	Date
Melbourne	19.20 (134)	St Kilda	14.8 (92)	MCG	26,324	14 June 1980
Fitzroy	18.15 (123)	Footscray	25.17 (167)	Junction Oval	10,681	14 June 1980
North Melbourne	15.11 (101)	Essendon	10.12 (72)	Arden Street Oval	28,068	14 June 1980
South Melbourne	12.12 (84)	Geelong	21.21 (147)	SCG	13,209	15 June 1980
Carlton	13.12 (90)	Collingwood	11.19 (85)	Princes Park	43,599	16 June 1980
Richmond	16.12 (108)	Hawthorn	11.22 (88)	MCG	57,572	16 June 1980

=== Round 13 ===
Home team	Home team score	Away team	Away team score	Venue	Crowd	Date
Hawthorn	21.17 (143)	St Kilda	16.13 (109)	Princes Park	11,686	21 June 1980
Footscray	15.14 (104)	South Melbourne	12.15 (87)	Western Oval	15,837	21 June 1980
Essendon	15.17 (107)	Richmond	16.21 (117)	Windy Hill	24,045	21 June 1980
Melbourne	18.21 (129)	Fitzroy	18.9 (117)	MCG	15,075	21 June 1980
Geelong	12.11 (83)	Carlton	12.6 (78)	Kardinia Park	26,526	21 June 1980
Collingwood	20.19 (139)	North Melbourne	13.15 (93)	VFL Park	54,675	21 June 1980

=== Round 14 ===
Home team	Home team score	Away team	Away team score	Venue	Crowd	Date
Geelong	13.6 (84)	North Melbourne	4.3 (27)	Kardinia Park	21,555	28 June 1980
Footscray	10.13 (73)	Melbourne	6.7 (43)	Western Oval	11,785	28 June 1980
Hawthorn	21.17 (143)	Fitzroy	8.7 (55)	Princes Park	8,209	28 June 1980
Richmond	9.19 (73)	Collingwood	7.22 (64)	MCG	64,054	28 June 1980
South Melbourne	5.9 (39)	Carlton	10.18 (78)	Lake Oval	12,362	28 June 1980
Essendon	6.12 (48)	St Kilda	7.11 (53)	VFL Park	20,485	28 June 1980

=== Round 15 ===
Home team	Home team score	Away team	Away team score	Venue	Crowd	Date
St Kilda	5.6 (36)	South Melbourne	6.14 (50)	Moorabbin Oval	16,840	12 July 1980
Fitzroy	15.19 (109)	Richmond	12.16 (88)	Junction Oval	11,362	12 July 1980
Collingwood	11.22 (88)	Essendon	13.6 (84)	Victoria Park	30,659	12 July 1980
North Melbourne	15.19 (109)	Footscray	7.8 (50)	Arden Street Oval	15,277	12 July 1980
Melbourne	15.13 (103)	Carlton	18.24 (132)	MCG	26,216	12 July 1980
Hawthorn	4.13 (37)	Geelong	17.15 (117)	VFL Park	34,204	12 July 1980

=== Round 16 ===
Home team	Home team score	Away team	Away team score	Venue	Crowd	Date
Essendon	20.9 (129)	South Melbourne	19.19 (133)	Windy Hill	17,471	19 July 1980
Collingwood	22.17 (149)	Hawthorn	19.8 (122)	Victoria Park	25,090	19 July 1980
Carlton	24.16 (160)	Footscray	15.13 (103)	Princes Park	18,792	19 July 1980
Melbourne	15.15 (105)	Geelong	17.12 (114)	MCG	23,327	19 July 1980
North Melbourne	17.13 (115)	Fitzroy	13.8 (86)	VFL Park	16,002	19 July 1980
St Kilda	11.4 (70)	Richmond	34.18 (222)	SCG	14,077	20 July 1980

=== Round 17 ===
Home team	Home team score	Away team	Away team score	Venue	Crowd	Date
Footscray	25.10 (160)	Hawthorn	15.17 (107)	Western Oval	12,362	26 July 1980
Essendon	18.14 (122)	Fitzroy	17.14 (116)	Windy Hill	14,372	26 July 1980
Carlton	14.17 (101)	North Melbourne	20.13 (133)	Princes Park	26,347	26 July 1980
South Melbourne	17.22 (124)	Melbourne	13.12 (90)	Lake Oval	11,643	26 July 1980
Richmond	13.15 (93)	Geelong	16.14 (110)	MCG	70,068	26 July 1980
St Kilda	16.11 (107)	Collingwood	32.19 (211)	VFL Park	33,933	26 July 1980

=== Round 18 ===
Home team	Home team score	Away team	Away team score	Venue	Crowd	Date
Fitzroy	15.14 (104)	St Kilda	12.8 (80)	Junction Oval	6,836	2 August 1980
Collingwood	11.24 (90)	South Melbourne	8.9 (57)	Victoria Park	24,739	2 August 1980
North Melbourne	12.15 (87)	Melbourne	7.15 (57)	Arden Street Oval	7,544	2 August 1980
Geelong	15.14 (104)	Essendon	13.12 (90)	Kardinia Park	24,738	2 August 1980
Hawthorn	9.15 (69)	Carlton	16.17 (113)	Princes Park	15,046	2 August 1980
Richmond	23.18 (156)	Footscray	6.5 (41)	VFL Park	18,282	2 August 1980

=== Round 19 ===
Home team	Home team score	Away team	Away team score	Venue	Crowd	Date
Essendon	18.8 (116)	Footscray	11.8 (74)	Windy Hill	16,952	9 August 1980
Carlton	12.19 (91)	Richmond	10.10 (70)	Princes Park	30,051	9 August 1980
South Melbourne	12.13 (85)	North Melbourne	11.7 (73)	Lake Oval	13,681	9 August 1980
Melbourne	9.10 (64)	Hawthorn	19.27 (141)	MCG	15,447	9 August 1980
St Kilda	13.10 (88)	Geelong	11.17 (83)	Moorabbin Oval	13,236	9 August 1980
Collingwood	19.10 (124)	Fitzroy	16.19 (115)	VFL Park	31,013	9 August 1980

=== Round 20 ===
Home team	Home team score	Away team	Away team score	Venue	Crowd	Date
Footscray	16.22 (118)	St Kilda	11.7 (73)	Western Oval	13,966	16 August 1980
Carlton	25.14 (164)	Essendon	16.7 (103)	Princes Park	27,955	16 August 1980
Richmond	26.18 (174)	Melbourne	16.13 (109)	MCG	19,048	16 August 1980
South Melbourne	20.14 (134)	Fitzroy	17.15 (117)	Lake Oval	12,015	16 August 1980
Geelong	14.15 (99)	Collingwood	12.9 (81)	Kardinia Park	42,198	16 August 1980
Hawthorn	11.13 (79)	North Melbourne	20.15 (135)	VFL Park	21,739	16 August 1980

=== Round 21 ===
Home team	Home team score	Away team	Away team score	Venue	Crowd	Date
North Melbourne	14.14 (98)	Richmond	15.19 (109)	Arden Street Oval	23,682	23 August 1980
Fitzroy	16.21 (117)	Geelong	20.12 (132)	Junction Oval	12,004	23 August 1980
Collingwood	19.16 (130)	Footscray	13.14 (92)	Victoria Park	23,472	23 August 1980
Melbourne	14.17 (101)	Essendon	18.14 (122)	MCG	23,530	23 August 1980
St Kilda	13.9 (87)	Carlton	20.16 (136)	Moorabbin Oval	21,258	23 August 1980
Hawthorn	16.17 (113)	South Melbourne	12.11 (83)	VFL Park	19,882	23 August 1980

=== Round 22 ===
Home team	Home team score	Away team	Away team score	Venue	Crowd	Date
North Melbourne	11.17 (83)	St Kilda	12.11 (83)	Arden Street Oval	10,302	30 August 1980
Essendon	15.12 (102)	Hawthorn	8.14 (62)	Windy Hill	17,772	30 August 1980
Carlton	21.20 (146)	Fitzroy	20.22 (142)	Princes Park	22,495	30 August 1980
South Melbourne	16.11 (107)	Richmond	7.11 (53)	Lake Oval	21,964	30 August 1980
Melbourne	9.12 (66)	Collingwood	19.10 (124)	MCG	52,791	30 August 1980
Geelong	12.18 (90)	Footscray	5.10 (40)	VFL Park	21,186	30 August 1980

== Ladder ==
(P)	Premiers
	Qualified for finals

#	Team	P	W	L	D	PF	PA	%	Pts
1	Geelong	22	17	5	0	2362	1888	125.1	68
2	Carlton	22	17	5	0	2576	2128	121.1	68
3	Richmond (P)	22	16	5	1	2754	1990	138.4	66
4	North Melbourne	22	14	7	1	2345	1894	123.8	58
5	Collingwood	22	14	7	1	2491	2178	114.4	58
6	South Melbourne	22	13	9	0	2211	2174	101.7	52
7	Essendon	22	10	12	0	2268	2151	105.4	40
8	Hawthorn	22	10	12	0	2249	2381	94.5	40
9	Melbourne	22	5	17	0	2140	2709	79.0	20
10	Footscray	22	5	17	0	2056	2737	75.1	20
11	St Kilda	22	4	16	2	1872	2704	69.2	20
12	Fitzroy	22	4	17	1	2398	2788	86.0	18

Rules for classification: 1. premiership points; 2. percentage; 3. points for
Average score: 105.0
Source: AFL Tables

== Finals series ==
=== Finals week 1 ===
Game	Home team	Home team score	Away team	Away team score	Venue	Crowd	Date
QF	Carlton	10.14 (74)	Richmond	18.8 (116)	VFL Park	59,014	6 September 1980
EF	North Melbourne	14.12 (96)	Collingwood	14.20 (104)	MCG	83,033	6 September 1980

=== Finals week 2 ===
Game	Home team	Home team score	Away team	Away team score	Venue	Crowd	Date
1st SF	Carlton	15.12 (102)	Collingwood	22.20 (152)	MCG	94,451	13 September 1980
2nd SF	Geelong	11.5 (71)	Richmond	14.11 (95)	VFL Park	65,303	13 September 1980

=== Preliminary final ===
Game	Home team	Home team score	Away team	Away team score	Venue	Crowd	Date
PF	Geelong	13.11 (89)	Collingwood	13.15 (93)	VFL Park	75,526	20 September 1980

=== Grand final ===
Game	Home team	Home team score	Away team	Away team score	Venue	Crowd	Date
Grand Final	Richmond	23.21 (159)	Collingwood	9.24 (78)	MCG	113,461	27 September 1980

== Season notes ==
- Following persistent wrestling between ruckmen Peter Moore and Gary Dempsey at centre bounces during the 1979 Preliminary Final between Collingwood and North Melbourne, the VFL introduced for the 1980 season a dividing line drawn across the centre circle in the wing-to-wing direction; under the new rules, each ruckman was forced to begin and run from his side of the line at a centre bounce, to eliminate wrestling. The rule was officially adopted at the national level in November 1982.
- In Round 4, Essendon's Phil Carman was reported for striking St. Kilda's Garry Sidebottom and headbutting boundary umpire Graham Carberry at Moorabbin. He was suspended for a total of 20 matches—4 for striking Sidebottom and 16 for headbutting Carberry.
- North Melbourne's Kerry Good scored the winning goal after the final siren had sounded in the 1980 Escort Championships Night Grand Final at VFL Park—a goal that was highly controversial as the umpires had not heard the siren seconds before Kerry Good had marked the ball from a kick by Malcolm Blight. Collingwood lost the match by only three points.
- The league threatened to kick Footscray off the Western Oval and force it to play its games away from home, after the Footscray Council granted the Footscray J.U.S.T. (a soccer team playing in the NSL) a lease to play games at the ground on Sundays – in defiance of a League stipulation that League grounds could not be shared with other codes during winter. In the end, Footscray-J.U.S.T. played most of its games elsewhere, and the League was not forced to follow through on its ultimatum.
- On 5 July, the VFL put together three separate Victorian representative teams to compete in different interstate games. The No. 1 team recorded a 21-point victory against Western Australia at VFL Park, and the No. 2 team recorded an 80-point win against Queensland at the Gabba; but, the No. 3 team suffered an upset 13-point loss against the A.C.T. at Manuka Oval, prompting league president Dr Allan Aylett to describe it as the worst team ever to represent Victoria.
- 1980 was the first season in which neither of the top two teams of the home-and-away season reached the grand final. It would be the only such instance for nearly four decades, until the 2019 AFL season.
- To date, this is the only season in which the bottom placed side scored more points during the home & away season than the top finishing side.

== Awards ==
- The leading goal kicker was Michael Roach of Richmond with 112 goals
- The Brownlow Medal was won by Footscray's Kelvin Templeton
- The Richmond Football Club set a unique record, with the club's three full-forwards each kicking more than 100 goals in the 1980 season.
  - The full-forward of its Senior team, Michael Roach, kicked 112 goals.
  - The full-forward of its Reserve team, Mark Jackson, kicked 131 goals (a record for the Reserve competition).
  - The full-forward of its Under-19 team, Peter Lane, kicked 116 goals.
- The under 19s premiership was won by Richmond 15.13 (103) against Fitzroy 13.11 (89) in the under 19s Grand Final on 27 September.
- The reserves premiership was won by Geelong 24.15 (159) against South Melbourne 19.12 (126) in the reserves Grand Final on 27 September.
- The seniors premiership was won by Richmond 23.21 (159) against Collingwood 9.24 (78) in the seniors Grand Final on 27 September.

== Sources ==
- 1980 VFL season at AFL Tables
- 1980 VFL season at Australian Football
