= 1978 VFL season =

82nd season of the Victorian Football League (VFL)

1978 VFL premiership season
- Teams: 12
- Premiers: Hawthorn; 4th premiership
- Minor premiers: North Melbourne; 2nd minor premiership
- Night series: Fitzroy; 1st Night series win
- Brownlow Medallist: Malcolm Blight (North Melbourne)
- Coleman Medallist: Kelvin Templeton (Footscray)

Attendance
- Matches played: 138
- Total attendance: 3,478,015 (25,203 per match)
- Highest: 101,704

The 1978 VFL season was the 82nd season of the Victorian Football League (VFL), the highest level senior Australian rules football competition in Victoria. The season featured twelve clubs, ran from 1 April until 30 September, and comprised a 22-game home-and-away season followed by a finals series featuring the top five clubs.

The premiership was won by the Hawthorn Football Club for the fourth time, after it defeated North Melbourne by 18 points in the 1978 VFL Grand Final.

== Rule changes ==
- The 19th and 20th men were converted into interchange players, meaning that any two players could be rested at any time, and could return to the field.
- Goal umpires required to touch goal post if the ball had hit post. Also two flags were positioned at one post and one flag at the other to save time when signalling scores.

== Night series ==
Fitzroy defeated North Melbourne 13.18 (96) to 2.8 (20) in the final.

== Home-and-away season ==
=== Round 1 ===
Home team	Home team score	Away team	Away team score	Venue	Crowd	Date
Hawthorn	22.15 (147)	Melbourne	9.14 (68)	Princes Park	10,632	1 April 1978
Footscray	11.14 (80)	North Melbourne	23.11 (149)	Western Oval	20,420	1 April 1978
Fitzroy	15.11 (101)	St Kilda	16.13 (109)	Junction Oval	17,030	1 April 1978
Essendon	19.9 (123)	South Melbourne	14.18 (102)	Windy Hill	23,562	1 April 1978
Geelong	11.10 (76)	Collingwood	17.16 (118)	Kardinia Park	27,463	1 April 1978
Richmond	25.24 (174)	Carlton	14.13 (97)	MCG	49,031	1 April 1978

=== Round 2 ===
	Round 2
Saturday, 8 April (2:10 pm)	Carlton 13.17 (95)	def. by	Geelong 15.19 (109)	Princes Park (crowd: 18,932)	Report
Saturday, 8 April (2:10 pm)	Collingwood 22.23 (155)	def.	Essendon 12.16 (88)	Victoria Park (crowd: 34,665)	Report
Saturday, 8 April (2:10 pm)	Melbourne 24.23 (167)	def.	Fitzroy 23.19 (157)	MCG (crowd: 15,613)	Report
Saturday, 8 April (2:10 pm)	St Kilda 20.17 (137)	def.	Footscray 19.16 (130)	Moorabbin Oval (crowd: 18,540)	Report
Saturday, 8 April (2:10 pm)	South Melbourne 16.8 (104)	def. by	Hawthorn 18.24 (132)	Lake Oval (crowd: 15,072)	Report
Saturday, 8 April (2:10 pm)	North Melbourne 25.16 (166)	def.	Richmond 14.9 (93)	Arden Street Oval (crowd: 22,505)	Report
Fitzroy broke South Melbourne's 1976 record for the highest losing score against Melbourne by four points. This record would last until the 1989 VFL season.

=== Round 3 ===
Home team	Home team score	Away team	Away team score	Venue	Crowd	Date
Richmond	16.14 (110)	St Kilda	15.20 (110)	MCG	35,602	15 April 1978
Footscray	10.16 (76)	Geelong	21.14 (140)	Western Oval	16,949	15 April 1978
Essendon	15.15 (105)	Fitzroy	14.17 (101)	Windy Hill	16,300	15 April 1978
Carlton	13.20 (98)	Melbourne	11.19 (85)	Princes Park	17,765	15 April 1978
South Melbourne	18.11 (119)	Collingwood	14.18 (102)	Lake Oval	20,733	15 April 1978
North Melbourne	16.15 (111)	Hawthorn	12.14 (86)	VFL Park	39,097	15 April 1978

=== Round 4 ===
Home team	Home team score	Away team	Away team score	Venue	Crowd	Date
Geelong	18.17 (125)	Richmond	15.8 (98)	Kardinia Park	20,566	22 April 1978
Fitzroy	21.17 (143)	South Melbourne	18.16 (124)	Junction Oval	13,660	22 April 1978
Collingwood	14.19 (103)	Hawthorn	15.15 (105)	Victoria Park	28,714	22 April 1978
St Kilda	14.16 (100)	North Melbourne	17.17 (119)	Moorabbin Oval	29,117	22 April 1978
Melbourne	18.19 (127)	Footscray	18.12 (120)	MCG	14,865	22 April 1978
Carlton	16.8 (104)	Essendon	19.17 (131)	VFL Park	34,516	22 April 1978

=== Round 5 ===
Home team	Home team score	Away team	Away team score	Venue	Crowd	Date
Richmond	19.16 (130)	Melbourne	8.11 (59)	MCG	34,212	25 April 1978
St Kilda	14.14 (98)	Geelong	9.11 (65)	VFL Park	43,388	25 April 1978
Hawthorn	14.17 (101)	Fitzroy	15.12 (102)	Princes Park	13,528	29 April 1978
Footscray	15.20 (110)	Essendon	13.15 (93)	Western Oval	20,328	29 April 1978
North Melbourne	19.10 (124)	Collingwood	17.13 (115)	Arden Street Oval	31,424	29 April 1978
South Melbourne	18.9 (117)	Carlton	17.14 (116)	Lake Oval	20,183	29 April 1978

=== Round 6 ===
	Round 6
Saturday, 6 May (2:10 pm)	Carlton 19.12 (126)	def. by	Hawthorn 24.13 (157)	Princes Park (crowd: 19,649)	Report
Saturday, 6 May (2:10 pm)	Fitzroy 14.12 (96)	def. by	Collingwood 22.16 (148)	Junction Oval (crowd: 25232)	Report
Saturday, 6 May (2:10 pm)	Essendon 22.18 (150)	def.	Richmond 19.15 (129)	Windy Hill (crowd: 21946)	Report
Saturday, 6 May (2:10 pm)	Footscray 16.9 (105)	def. by	South Melbourne 18.15 (123)	VFL Park (crowd: 19263)	Report
Saturday, 6 May (2:10 pm)	Geelong 12.16 (88)	def. by	North Melbourne 16.14 (110)	Kardinia Park (crowd: 23,074)	Report
Saturday, 6 May (2:10 pm)	Melbourne 21.15 (141)	def. by	St Kilda 31.18 (204)	MCG (crowd: 24852)	Report
Melbourne and St Kilda set the current record for the highest aggregate score in a game, the two teams amassing 52.33 (345). This broke the record set in the 1972 VFL Grand Final. The Saints also kicked their highest score in a match.

=== Round 7 ===
Home team	Home team score	Away team	Away team score	Venue	Crowd	Date
Richmond	14.14 (98)	South Melbourne	19.11 (125)	MCG	25,904	13 May 1978
Hawthorn	27.15 (177)	Footscray	13.13 (91)	Princes Park	9,099	13 May 1978
North Melbourne	14.14 (98)	Fitzroy	14.11 (95)	Arden Street Oval	14,150	13 May 1978
St Kilda	17.11 (113)	Essendon	16.11 (107)	Moorabbin Oval	30,760	13 May 1978
Collingwood	9.14 (68)	Carlton	12.13 (85)	Victoria Park	26,782	13 May 1978
Geelong	18.18 (126)	Melbourne	21.13 (139)	VFL Park	13,072	13 May 1978

=== Round 8 ===
Home team	Home team score	Away team	Away team score	Venue	Crowd	Date
Melbourne	8.13 (61)	North Melbourne	20.17 (137)	MCG	21,268	20 May 1978
Essendon	11.10 (76)	Geelong	7.18 (60)	Windy Hill	21,212	20 May 1978
Carlton	8.15 (63)	Fitzroy	9.7 (61)	Princes Park	21,520	20 May 1978
South Melbourne	20.16 (136)	St Kilda	4.13 (37)	Lake Oval	21,494	20 May 1978
Footscray	14.5 (89)	Collingwood	14.9 (93)	Western Oval	19,096	20 May 1978
Richmond	9.16 (70)	Hawthorn	14.15 (99)	VFL Park	27,224	20 May 1978

=== Round 9 ===
Home team	Home team score	Away team	Away team score	Venue	Crowd	Date
Geelong	16.13 (109)	South Melbourne	14.11 (95)	Kardinia Park	21,603	27 May 1978
Fitzroy	13.14 (92)	Footscray	18.9 (117)	Junction Oval	11,903	27 May 1978
Collingwood	12.20 (92)	Richmond	10.16 (76)	Victoria Park	28,651	27 May 1978
Carlton	18.9 (117)	North Melbourne	8.11 (59)	Princes Park	30,976	27 May 1978
St Kilda	8.9 (57)	Hawthorn	13.19 (97)	Moorabbin Oval	25,293	27 May 1978
Melbourne	8.12 (60)	Essendon	15.12 (102)	VFL Park	28,231	27 May 1978

=== Round 10 ===
Home team	Home team score	Away team	Away team score	Venue	Crowd	Date
Hawthorn	12.24 (96)	Geelong	8.13 (61)	Princes Park	11,066	3 June 1978
Richmond	12.14 (86)	Fitzroy	11.14 (80)	MCG	21,122	3 June 1978
North Melbourne	13.7 (85)	Essendon	12.10 (82)	Arden Street Oval	28,828	3 June 1978
South Melbourne	24.18 (162)	Melbourne	14.8 (92)	Lake Oval	15,738	5 June 1978
Footscray	19.11 (125)	Carlton	15.14 (104)	Western Oval	30,197	5 June 1978
St Kilda	14.13 (97)	Collingwood	18.23 (131)	VFL Park	72,669	5 June 1978

=== Round 11 ===
Home team	Home team score	Away team	Away team score	Venue	Crowd	Date
Fitzroy	16.15 (111)	Geelong	16.18 (114)	Junction Oval	10,300	17 June 1978
Essendon	16.8 (104)	Hawthorn	19.19 (133)	Windy Hill	23,302	17 June 1978
Collingwood	17.25 (127)	Melbourne	10.7 (67)	Victoria Park	19,931	17 June 1978
Carlton	23.27 (165)	St Kilda	8.17 (65)	Princes Park	25,388	17 June 1978
Richmond	23.17 (155)	Footscray	14.13 (97)	MCG	22,764	17 June 1978
South Melbourne	15.7 (97)	North Melbourne	17.15 (117)	VFL Park	31,037	17 June 1978

=== Round 12 ===
Home team	Home team score	Away team	Away team score	Venue	Crowd	Date
Carlton	20.17 (137)	Richmond	13.16 (94)	Princes Park	28,266	24 June 1978
Melbourne	15.18 (108)	Hawthorn	18.20 (128)	MCG	14,652	24 June 1978
North Melbourne	8.12 (60)	Footscray	13.12 (90)	Arden Street Oval	14,269	24 June 1978
St Kilda	17.9 (111)	Fitzroy	20.14 (134)	Moorabbin Oval	15,822	24 June 1978
South Melbourne	13.19 (97)	Essendon	17.18 (120)	Lake Oval	18,574	24 June 1978
Collingwood	7.14 (56)	Geelong	13.18 (96)	VFL Park	31,636	24 June 1978

=== Round 13 ===
	Round 13
Saturday, 1 July (2:10 pm)	Geelong 8.9 (57)	def. by	Carlton 9.13 (67)	Kardinia Park (crowd: 25,185)	Report
Saturday, 1 July (2:10 pm)	Essendon 12.26 (98)	def. by	Collingwood 14.21 (105)	Windy Hill (crowd: 29,768)	Report
Saturday, 1 July (2:10 pm)	Fitzroy 19.27 (141)	def.	Melbourne 8.13 (61)	VFL Park (crowd: 13,933)	Report
Saturday, 1 July (2:10 pm)	Footscray 33.15 (213)	def.	St Kilda 16.10 (106)	Western Oval (crowd: 16,300)	Report
Saturday, 1 July (2:10 pm)	Hawthorn 21.14 (140)	def.	South Melbourne 18.11 (119)	Princes Park (crowd: 13,853)	Report
Saturday, 1 July (2:10 pm)	Richmond 21.16 (142)	def.	North Melbourne 17.15 (117)	MCG (crowd: 27,156)	Report
Footscray kicked their highest-ever score of 33.15 (213) and Kelvin Templeton also set a club record for most goals in a game by an individual player, kicking 15 goals 9 behinds. It also set the record for the most scoring shots in a game by an individual player. The last Bulldog to kick 10 goals in a game was Ron Grove against Melbourne in Round 5, 1946. The score also broke the VFL record previously held by Carlton who kicked 30.30 (210) against Hawthorn in Round 2, 1969.

=== Round 14 ===
Home team	Home team score	Away team	Away team score	Venue	Crowd	Date
North Melbourne	19.7 (121)	St Kilda	18.16 (124)	Arden Street Oval	12,599	8 July 1978
Footscray	20.7 (127)	Melbourne	8.11 (59)	Western Oval	13,325	8 July 1978
Richmond	17.20 (122)	Geelong	18.9 (117)	MCG	24,417	8 July 1978
South Melbourne	22.11 (143)	Fitzroy	13.15 (93)	Lake Oval	16,642	8 July 1978
Essendon	13.24 (102)	Carlton	14.11 (95)	Windy Hill	29,831	8 July 1978
Hawthorn	10.14 (74)	Collingwood	13.6 (84)	VFL Park	46,066	8 July 1978

=== Round 15 ===
Home team	Home team score	Away team	Away team score	Venue	Crowd	Date
Hawthorn	10.14 (74)	North Melbourne	7.13 (55)	Princes Park	16,214	15 July 1978
Collingwood	17.12 (114)	South Melbourne	12.22 (94)	Victoria Park	23,729	15 July 1978
St Kilda	10.11 (71)	Richmond	19.11 (125)	Moorabbin Oval	18,954	15 July 1978
Geelong	12.12 (84)	Footscray	10.12 (72)	Kardinia Park	15,700	15 July 1978
Fitzroy	15.11 (101)	Essendon	11.17 (83)	Junction Oval	13,550	15 July 1978
Melbourne	2.14 (26)	Carlton	17.13 (115)	VFL Park	16,870	15 July 1978

=== Round 16 ===
Home team	Home team score	Away team	Away team score	Venue	Crowd	Date
Melbourne	14.9 (93)	Richmond	17.19 (121)	MCG	18,416	22 July 1978
Geelong	16.8 (104)	St Kilda	12.20 (92)	Kardinia Park	16,219	22 July 1978
Fitzroy	18.14 (122)	Hawthorn	17.19 (121)	Junction Oval	12,240	22 July 1978
Collingwood	7.17 (59)	North Melbourne	15.11 (101)	Victoria Park	32,286	22 July 1978
Carlton	16.16 (112)	South Melbourne	9.17 (71)	Princes Park	24,277	22 July 1978
Essendon	13.8 (86)	Footscray	15.17 (107)	VFL Park	30,200	22 July 1978

=== Round 17 ===
Home team	Home team score	Away team	Away team score	Venue	Crowd	Date
St Kilda	20.21 (141)	Melbourne	13.11 (89)	Moorabbin Oval	13,118	29 July 1978
North Melbourne	18.14 (122)	Geelong	10.16 (76)	Arden Street Oval	15,775	29 July 1978
South Melbourne	15.15 (105)	Footscray	13.13 (91)	Lake Oval	14,112	29 July 1978
Richmond	20.16 (136)	Essendon	13.18 (96)	MCG	41,878	29 July 1978
Hawthorn	13.17 (95)	Carlton	18.11 (119)	Princes Park	28,132	29 July 1978
Collingwood	16.11 (107)	Fitzroy	11.11 (77)	VFL Park	32,246	29 July 1978

=== Round 18 ===
Home team	Home team score	Away team	Away team score	Venue	Crowd	Date
Footscray	17.10 (112)	Hawthorn	17.16 (118)	Western Oval	17,285	5 August 1978
Fitzroy	11.16 (82)	North Melbourne	19.10 (124)	Junction Oval	13,022	5 August 1978
Essendon	11.16 (82)	St Kilda	18.13 (121)	Windy Hill	18,410	5 August 1978
Carlton	14.19 (103)	Collingwood	8.14 (62)	Princes Park	43,313	5 August 1978
Melbourne	13.17 (95)	Geelong	14.17 (101)	MCG	12,363	5 August 1978
South Melbourne	14.9 (93)	Richmond	9.16 (70)	VFL Park	31,717	5 August 1978

=== Round 19 ===
Home team	Home team score	Away team	Away team score	Venue	Crowd	Date
St Kilda	13.7 (85)	South Melbourne	3.19 (37)	Moorabbin Oval	20,933	12 August 1978
Hawthorn	18.19 (127)	Richmond	10.10 (70)	Princes Park	15,980	12 August 1978
Collingwood	11.16 (82)	Footscray	10.6 (66)	Victoria Park	24,069	12 August 1978
North Melbourne	26.18 (174)	Melbourne	8.13 (61)	Arden Street Oval	9,183	12 August 1978
Geelong	14.8 (92)	Essendon	13.7 (85)	Kardinia Park	15,080	12 August 1978
Fitzroy	8.10 (58)	Carlton	9.15 (69)	VFL Park	21,410	12 August 1978

=== Round 20 ===
Home team	Home team score	Away team	Away team score	Venue	Crowd	Date
Essendon	19.16 (130)	Melbourne	21.10 (136)	Windy Hill	11,984	19 August 1978
South Melbourne	24.11 (155)	Geelong	26.11 (167)	Lake Oval	15,259	19 August 1978
Footscray	9.17 (71)	Fitzroy	21.13 (139)	Western Oval	12,525	19 August 1978
Richmond	16.13 (109)	Collingwood	19.9 (123)	MCG	59,580	19 August 1978
North Melbourne	9.16 (70)	Carlton	19.17 (131)	Arden Street Oval	28,965	19 August 1978
Hawthorn	12.11 (83)	St Kilda	21.13 (139)	VFL Park	31,677	19 August 1978

- Richmond were leading Collingwood by 55 points at the 10-minute mark of the second quarter before the Magpies hit back to win by 14 points. It was at the time the third-biggest comeback in League history.

=== Round 21 ===
Home team	Home team score	Away team	Away team score	Venue	Crowd	Date
Melbourne	15.16 (106)	South Melbourne	11.19 (85)	MCG	13,488	26 August 1978
Geelong	13.8 (86)	Hawthorn	13.10 (88)	Kardinia Park	21,663	26 August 1978
Fitzroy	20.14 (134)	Richmond	17.15 (117)	Junction Oval	11,200	26 August 1978
Collingwood	22.15 (147)	St Kilda	15.17 (107)	Victoria Park	31,537	26 August 1978
Carlton	23.7 (145)	Footscray	15.12 (102)	Princes Park	22,397	26 August 1978
Essendon	7.9 (51)	North Melbourne	11.11 (77)	VFL Park	22,337	26 August 1978

=== Round 22 ===
Home team	Home team score	Away team	Away team score	Venue	Crowd	Date
North Melbourne	16.15 (111)	South Melbourne	12.15 (87)	Arden Street Oval	15,607	2 September 1978
Geelong	13.22 (100)	Fitzroy	5.8 (38)	Kardinia Park	22,842	2 September 1978
Hawthorn	17.16 (118)	Essendon	16.13 (109)	Princes Park	14,534	2 September 1978
Melbourne	19.11 (125)	Collingwood	24.12 (156)	MCG	40,267	2 September 1978
St Kilda	16.10 (106)	Carlton	9.12 (66)	Moorabbin Oval	35,850	2 September 1978
Footscray	11.15 (81)	Richmond	19.20 (134)	VFL Park	17,768	2 September 1978

== Ladder ==
(P)	Premiers
	Qualified for finals

#	Team	P	W	L	D	PF	PA	%	Pts
1	North Melbourne	22	16	6	0	2407	1991	120.9	64
2	Hawthorn (P)	22	16	6	0	2496	2120	117.7	64
3	Collingwood	22	15	7	0	2347	2072	113.3	60
4	Carlton	22	14	8	0	2329	1994	116.8	56
5	Geelong	22	12	10	0	2153	2104	102.3	48
6	St Kilda	22	11	10	1	2330	2503	93.1	46
7	Richmond	22	10	11	1	2459	2389	102.9	42
8	South Melbourne	22	9	13	0	2390	2383	100.3	36
9	Fitzroy	22	8	14	0	2258	2339	96.5	32
10	Essendon	22	8	14	0	2203	2337	94.3	32
11	Footscray	22	7	15	0	2272	2508	90.6	28
12	Melbourne	22	5	17	0	2025	2929	69.1	20

Rules for classification: 1. premiership points; 2. percentage; 3. points for
Average score: 104.8
Source: AFL Tables

== Finals series ==
=== Finals week 1 ===
Home team	Score	Away team	Score	Venue	Crowd	Date
Carlton	15.15 (105)	Geelong	9.18 (72)	VFL Park	57,505	9 September
Collingwood	14.14 (98)	Hawthorn	23.16 (154)	MCG	79,931	9 September

=== Finals week 2 ===
Home team	Score	Away team	Score	Venue	Crowd	Date
Collingwood	15.18 (108)	Carlton	13.15 (93)	MCG	91,933	16 September
North Melbourne	10.13 (73)	Hawthorn	12.15 (87)	VFL Park	48,716	16 September

=== Preliminary final ===
Home team	Score	Away team	Score	Venue	Crowd	Date
North Melbourne	14.12 (96)	Collingwood	12.12 (84)	VFL Park	73,354	23 September

=== Grand final ===
Game	Home team	Home team score	Away team	Away team score	Venue	Crowd	Date
Grand final	Hawthorn	18.13 (121)	North Melbourne	15.13 (103)	MCG	101,704	30 September 1978

== Notable events ==
- In Round 20, Prime Minister Malcolm Fraser (who was the Number 1 ticket holder for Carlton throughout his time in office) was booed incessantly during the second half of the North Melbourne vs Carlton match at the Arden Street Oval. The booing continued right up to the moment when Mr. Fraser stepped inside his limousine and was driven away from the ground.

== Awards ==
- The Coleman Medal was won by Kelvin Templeton of Footscray with 118 goals.
- The Brownlow Medal was won by Malcolm Blight of North Melbourne
- The reserves premiership was won by North Melbourne. North Melbourne 17.29 (131) defeated Hawthorn 11.13 (79) in the grand final, held as a curtain-raiser to the seniors grand final at the Melbourne Cricket Ground on 30 September.

== Sources ==
- 1978 VFL season at AFL Tables
- 1978 VFL season at Australian Football
