= 1980 VFL grand final =

Grand final of the 1980 Victorian Football League season

1980 VFL Grand Final

Richmond	Collingwood
23.21 (159)	9.24 (78)
	1	2	3	4
RICH	6.5 (41)	11.11 (77)	15.17 (107)	23.21 (159)
COLL	2.6 (18)	4.10 (34)	5.18 (48)	9.24 (78)
- Date: 27 September 1980
- Stadium: Melbourne Cricket Ground
- Attendance: 113,461
- Favourite: Richmond

Ceremonies
- Pre-match entertainment: Peter Allen

Accolades
- Norm Smith Medallist: Kevin Bartlett
- Jock McHale Medallist: Tony Jewell

Broadcast in Australia
- Network: Seven Network
- Commentators: Peter Landy, Lou Richards, Bob Skilton

The 1980 VFL Grand Final was an Australian rules football game contested between the Richmond Football Club and Collingwood Football Club, held at the Melbourne Cricket Ground in Melbourne on 27 September 1980. It was the 84th annual Grand Final of the Victorian Football League, staged to determine the premiers for the 1980 VFL season. The match, attended by 113,461 spectators, was won by Richmond by a margin of 81 points, marking that club's 10th VFL/AFL premiership victory, and they would not win the premiership again until 2017.

== Background ==
It was Richmond's first appearance in a premiership decider since winning the 1974 VFL Grand Final, while Collingwood had competed in and lost two of the previous three Grand Finals, in 1977 and 1979. The Magpies had not won a flag since the 1958 VFL Grand Final.

Richmond, under coach Tony Jewell, made the decision in the 1980 home-and-away season to move rover Kevin Bartlett to the half-forward flank, leading to him kicking 84 goals. At the conclusion of the season, Richmond had finished third on the VFL ladder (behind Geelong and Carlton) with 16 wins, 5 losses and a draw. Collingwood had finished fifth with 14 wins, 7 losses and a draw. Collingwood was coached by Tom Hafey, who at one time had coached Jewell at Richmond.

In the finals series leading up to the Grand Final, Collingwood defeated North Melbourne in the Elimination Final by 8 points before comfortably beating Carlton by 50 points to progress to the Preliminary Final. There they defeated Geelong by just 4 points to advance to the Grand Final. The Magpies became the first team to reach the Grand Final via the Elimination Final. Meanwhile, Richmond defeated Carlton by 42 points in the Qualifying Final and then Geelong by 24 points in the Second Semi-Final to progress to the Grand Final.

This was the first Grand Final in league history without either of the top two teams on the ladder after the home-and-away season. It wasn't until 2019, 39 years later, that this set of circumstances would be repeated.

In the lead-up to the game, Richmond had key injury concerns with Greg Strachan and David Cloke.

== Match summary ==
=== First quarter ===
Both teams struggled for accuracy early, with star Tigers forward Roach missing a set shot from a free kick and for the Magpies Kink's set shot going out on the full (an ominous sign of the poor day he was to have) and Low wasting a golden opportunity running into an open goal. Richmond got the first goal on the board five minutes into the quarter when Jess quickly played on from a 15-metre penalty and passed to Weightman in open space, allowing him to steady and kick truly from a slight angle.

=== Second quarter ===
The first few minutes of the first quarter were a tight affair, with the two teams trading scores. Collingwood led by a point 16 minutes into the game but from then Richmond completely outplayed the Magpies, with the game being effectively over at half time when the Tigers led by 43 points. Their midfield of Geoff Raines, Bryan Wood, Robert Wiley, Mervyn Keane and Dale Weightman dominated the clearances, feeding forwards Kevin Bartlett, Michael Roach and David Cloke.

=== Aftermath ===
The Norm Smith Medal was presented by Ron Barassi to Kevin Bartlett, who was unanimously judged best-on-ground for his seven-goal effort by a voting panel consisting of then VFL president Allen Aylett, VFL General Manager Jack Hamilton, Jack Dyer, The Age chief football writer Ron Carter, and ABC commentator Doug Heywood. His goal tally for the 1980 VFL finals was 21 which saw him become just the fourth player in history to kick 20 or more goals in a finals series. Cloke contributed 6 goals and Wiley 3 to the team's winning score.

The match statistics all pointed to Richmond's utter dominance; the 81-point margin set a new record for the biggest win in a VFL Grand Final to date, the Tigers had registered 44 scoring shots to Collingwood's 33, 205 kicks to 193, 120 handpasses to 55 and 74 marks to 52. There was added significance to the win for Richmond with long-time club servant Maurie Fleming ill in hospital and watching the game on television. He died one week later

In his report for The Age, chief football writer Ron Carter commented that the one-sided nature of the contest had damaged the sport, dashing the VFL's hopes for a Grand Final that had been billed as one for the ages. He also cited Collingwood's tough finals campaign as a key reason they were not at their best on the big day.

This was Collingwood's seventh Grand Final loss since 1958, in the era dubbed "the Colliwobbles".

== Teams ==
Richmond	Collingwood

Richmond
B:	7 Michael Malthouse	5 Emmett Dunne	19 Greg Strachan
HB:	46 Terry Smith	20 Jim Jess	31 Peter Welsh
C:	6 Stephen Mount	4 Geoff Raines	16 Bryan Wood
HF:	18 Mervyn Keane	33 David Cloke (vc)	29 Kevin Bartlett
F:	30 Francis Bourke	8 Michael Roach	2 Robert Wiley
Foll:	1 Mark Lee	22 Barry Rowlings	3 Dale Weightman
Int:	11 Bruce Monteath (c)	44 Daryl Freame	
Coach:	Tony Jewell		

Collingwood
B:	3 Stan Magro	6 Peter McCormack	24 Andrew Ireland
HB:	14 Kevin Morris (vc)	25 Billy Picken (dvc)	26 Ray Byrne
C:	1 Ricky Barham	35 Peter Daicos	29 Leigh Carlson
HF:	36 Rene Kink	9 Craig Stewart	16 Ian Low
F:	18 David Young	19 Craig Davis	23 Ray Shaw (c)
Foll:	30 Peter Moore	34 Russell Ohlsen	5 Ronald Wearmouth
Int:	22 Tony Shaw	33 Michael Woolnough	
Coach:	Tom Hafey		

Umpires

The umpiring panel for the match, comprising two field umpires, two boundary umpires and two goal umpires is given below.

1980 VFL Grand Final umpires
Position			Emergency
Field:	Bill Deller (5)	Ian Robinson (6)	
Boundary:	Leigh Paterson (4)	Geoffrey Willcox (5)	
Goal:	Kevin Barker (5)	Robert Barker (2)	

Numbers in brackets represent the number of grand finals umpired, including 1980.

== Goal kickers ==
Richmond

- Bartlett 7
- Cloke 6
- Wiley 3
- Keane 2
- Roach 2
- Jess 1
- Rowlings 1
- Weightman 1

Collingwood

- Picken 3
- Davis 2
- Ohlsen 1
- R.Shaw 1
- Moore 1
- Wearmouth 1

== See also ==
- 1980 VFL season

== Bibliography ==
- The Official statistical history of the AFL 2004
