= 1977 VFL grand final =

Grand final of the 1977 Victorian Football League season

1977 VFL Grand Final

Collingwood	North Melbourne
10.16 (76)	9.22 (76)
	1	2	3	4
COLL	1.5 (11)	4.8 (32)	9.12 (66)	10.16 (76)
NM	4.4 (28)	4.10 (34)	4.15 (39)	9.22 (76)
- Date: 24 September 1977
- Stadium: Melbourne Cricket Ground
- Attendance: 108,224
- Favourite: Collingwood
- Umpires: Ian Robinson, John Sutcliffe

Ceremonies
- Pre-match entertainment: Barry Crocker

Broadcast in Australia
- Network: Seven Network
- Commentators: Peter Ewin; Lou Richards

The 1977 VFL grand final was a series of two Australian rules football matches between the North Melbourne Football Club and the Collingwood Football Club. Together they are considered the 80th and 81st grand finals of the Victorian Football League and were staged to determine the premiers for the 1977 VFL season. The premiership is usually decided by a single match; however, as the first grand final ended in a draw, a grand final replay was played the following week and was won by North Melbourne. Both grand finals were held at the Melbourne Cricket Ground. The first was held on 24 September 1977. The game was attended by 108,224 spectators and ended in a draw, with both teams scoring 76 points. This was the second time a draw had occurred in a VFL grand final, the first being in 1948.

The premiership was decided by a full replay on 1 October 1977, attended by 98,491 people. North Melbourne defeated Collingwood by 27 points, marking their second VFL premiership victory.

The 1977 grand final was historically memorable for numerous reasons; besides the drawn result, it was the first grand final televised live in Victoria by the Seven Network, and the first to feature pre-match entertainment, which was provided by Barry Crocker.

== Background ==
Collingwood entered this premiership game after a seven-year absence, having last been defeated by Carlton in the 1970 VFL grand final. Its last premiership victory was the 1958 VFL grand final. In contrast, North Melbourne had contested the previous three premiership deciders, winning the 1975 VFL grand final but finishing runners-up in 1974 and 1976.

After finishing last place at the end of the 1976 season, Collingwood, under former Richmond coach Tom Hafey, had finished first on the ladder with 18 wins and 4 losses in 1977. North Melbourne had finished third (behind Hawthorn), with 15 wins and 7 losses.

In the finals series, North Melbourne lost to Hawthorn by 38 points in the qualifying final before defeating Richmond by 47 points in the first semi-final. They then met Hawthorn once again in the preliminary final, this time winning comfortably by 67 points to advance to the grand final. Collingwood advanced straight to the grand final with a thrilling two-point win over Hawthorn in the second semi-final.

The Magpies were without Phil Carman for the grand final, who had been suspended for two matches for striking Hawthorn's Michael Tuck in the second semi-final, and regular defender Ian Cooper, who had played the first 21 matches of the season before chipping an ankle bone. North Melbourne was without captain Keith Greig, who missed two-thirds of the season with a knee injury; David Dench served as acting captain.

Chief football writer for The Herald Alf Brown predicted a win for Collingwood; he claimed that up to half the spectators at the game would be supporting Collingwood, hence giving a kind of home ground advantage, and also pointed to the inconsistent output of North Melbourne's key players in recent games. In his weekly Tuesday column for The Canberra Times, Carlton star Alex Jesaulenko tipped North Melbourne to win, describing their momentum over the finals series as "running on the crest of a wave full flight into the grand final". In a somewhat prophetic tone, Jesaulenko predicted that "it [would] be the closest grand final in the VFL for many a long year — and a classic one too." He also bemoaned the fact that Carman would not play due to suspension, calling him "probably the most spectacular player in the VFL" and believing that his presence would have added an extra layer of excitement.

== Television coverage ==
Up until 1977, the VFL had been staunchly opposed to showing the grand final live on television in Victoria despite the growing demand. In the week leading up to the grand final, the commercial station Network Seven, managed by Ron Casey, finally arrived at a deal worth A$100,000 ($627,093 in 2022 figures) to televise the event live. However, the two sponsors for the telecast, Carlton & United Breweries and Just Jeans, did not completely cover the upfront fee demanded by the VFL.

Worryingly, power restrictions imposed by the State Electricity Commission of Victoria in response to a strike by 2,300 maintenance workers in the Latrobe Valley almost put the plans for the live telecast in jeopardy. Those restrictions were lifted at the last minute, meaning the event would not have to be broadcast on a 45-minute delay.

The drawn grand final was a ratings success, drawing a nationwide audience of over two million viewers, which was in line with Ron Casey's prediction of 2,250,000 viewers.

== First grand final ==
=== First quarter ===
Collingwood captain Max Richardson won the toss and elected to kick to the City end of the ground. North Melbourne scored the first goal of the game seven minutes into the opening quarter through acting captain and full-back David Dench, who had followed the play downfield. He played on immediately after taking an intercept mark from a clearing kick by Collingwood half-back Phil Manassa, dodged an attempted tackle and kicked a goal. The Kangaroos added a second goal a few minutes later when Phil Baker gathered the ball as it spilled behind a pack contest, finishing off a fine sequence of play which had started with Frank Gumbleton deep in defence.

The Magpies then got their first goal for the game—and their only goal for the quarter—through Graeme Anderson, who finished off a great piece of play upfield by Len Thompson, Ronnie Wearmouth and Ross Dunne to swoop onto the ball as it spilled free from a contest in the goal square and run into an open goal. Two further goals by Baker from set shots at the 16- and 21-minute mark would help give North Melbourne a 17-point lead at quarter time. During the quarter, Ray Shaw was reported for striking Ken Montgomery with a clenched fist to the stomach. Shaw would later be cleared to play in the replay.

=== Second quarter ===
From the first bounce, the ball was driven quickly into Collingwood's attack by Andrew Ireland and Anderson, who passed towards star forward Peter Moore. Moore was awarded a free kick in the marking contest with Gumbleton and converted the subsequent set shot for the first of his four goals in the game. Five minutes later, the margin was reduced to six points when North Melbourne's defenders were unable to intercept a tricky, bouncing kick into attack by Wearmouth, allowing Rene Kink to run onto the ball and score with a left-footed snap shot. The physical intensity of the match lifted as both sides traded behinds—Arnold Briedis kicking four of them, eventually finishing with seven—before the Magpies scored their third goal when Moore marked a long pass from Wayne Richardson and kicked straight at the 29-minute mark. North Melbourne's lead had been cut to two points when the siren sounded for half time, and North coach Ron Barassi voiced his displeasure.

=== Third quarter ===
Collingwood managed to maintain the momentum they had taken with them to half time, with Moore adding two goals early in the quarter to put the Magpies ahead for the first time. After another shot on goal hit the post, this time by Dench, the ball went back and forth for several minutes until a long kick into attack from Stan Alves towards Baker was well intercepted by Kevin Worthington, who played on quickly to find Shaw free on the half-back flank. Shaw went for a run, taking two bounces before directing a short pass into the path of the hard-running Ricky Barham, who took the mark while still in motion, steadied with a bounce and kicked Collingwood's fifth goal for the term from 40 metres out to extend the margin to 27 points at the 28-minute mark.

In the dying seconds, Briedis marked within scoring distance but was judged to have pushed Manassa in the back before taking the mark. He subsequently threw the ball away in frustration, giving away a 15-metre penalty as the siren sounded. Collingwood led by 27 points at three-quarter time, and North Melbourne had not scored a goal since the 21-minute mark of the first quarter. At the three-quarter-time huddle, Collingwood coach Tom Hafey angrily rebuked some of the Collingwood support staff who were already congratulating the players, and implored his players to focus on finishing the game.

=== Fourth quarter ===
Barassi made a number of positional changes in an attempt to steal the momentum from Collingwood, the most notable moves being Dench to centre half-forward and Darryl Sutton to full-forward. He also benched Malcolm Blight, who had been ineffective, and brought on Bill Nettlefold, whose energetic play was an important part of the Kangaroos' comeback.

The Magpies had a chance to extend their lead past five goals early in the quarter through Dunne, but his set shot veered off target. North Melbourne then went into attack, and finally, at the 5-minute mark, their run of 13 consecutive behinds ended when Sutton marked and converted his set shot. A minute later, North rebounded quickly out of defence, and with Collingwood's defenders ball-watching, Baker managed to slip unmarked into the goal square to score his fourth goal. Soon after, Manassa's handpass deep in defence was intercepted by Dench who ran in and kicked his second goal. At this point, North Melbourne had scored three goals in four minutes to reduce the margin to eight points.

At the 10-minute mark, Briedis took a strong pack mark, but had to wait to take his set shot as Doug Gott, who injured his knee in the marking contest, was stretchered off. Briedis had been having a poor day in front of goal, and it continued with his sixth behind. From the kick-in, the Kangaroos were again able to intercept, but Dench was unable to take full advantage, his rushed kick adding another behind to North Melbourne's score. At the 14-minute mark, the hard-running Wayne Schimmelbusch outpaced Ireland on the wing to intercept an attempted pass from Billy Picken, kicking North Melbourne back into attack. Running into the forward pocket, John Byrne gathered the ball as Collingwood defenders fumbled and fell over, kicking towards full-forward where Baker again had found space in the goal square. Baker kicked his fifth goal to level the scores.

Soon after, Hafey replaced Anderson with Shane Bond to give Collingwood some fresh legs. Over the next few minutes, both sides missed relatively easy goal-scoring chances from set shots and good opportunities in general play, but when Baker took a strong contested mark and kicked his sixth goal with time-on looming, North Melbourne held a seven-point lead. Collingwood fought desperately to stay in the game, and, at the 29-minute mark, Moore managed to outpoint Brent Crosswell and gather the ball at the top of the goal square, but his left-foot snap missed.

With the tension in the crowd mounting, the Magpies continued to press for an equalising goal while the Kangaroos were trying to play for time. After a shot from Stan Magro went out of bounds on the full, Nettlefold's kick back into play for North was marked at the back of the pack by Picken, who had come up from defence. His kick into the forward line was met by a pack of players, in which Dunne took a mark. Having already missed two shots for the quarter, the Magpie veteran converted his set shot from 25 metres out directly in front to tie the scores with the clock having just ticked over 33 minutes for the quarter.

North Melbourne made one last foray forward, which was cut off by Ireland. His kick out of defence was picked up by Bond, who was racing down the wing as the siren sounded. Players from both sides collapsed, confused and exhausted, while a scuffle between Peter Keenan and Kink was quickly defused.

=== Aftermath ===
This was the second grand final in VFL history to end in a draw, the first being the 1948 grand final between Melbourne and Essendon. Coincidentally, on the same day as this match took place, the grand final replay for the 1977 NSWRFL season was held. The first grand final, held the week before, finished in a 9–9 draw between St. George and Parramatta. Thus both major Australian football codes had a drawn grand final followed by a replay in 1977.

Among the football writers from the Sun News-Pictorial who used a Brownlow voting system to judge their best player, North Melbourne wingman Wayne Schimmelbusch tallied 11 out of a possible 18 votes to be considered best on ground, followed by Collingwood midfield enforcer Stan Magro with ten votes. A panel which viewed the game retrospectively for the AFL Record's grand final edition in 2001 voted Collingwood ruckman Len Thompson as the best player on the day; he gathered 21 disposals (14 kicks and seven handpasses), took ten marks, and had to deal with the attention of various North players throughout the afternoon. Xavier Tanner and Stan Alves also received votes for their efforts.

Barassi said later, "We should have won the game. I know that is a brave statement, but we did have five more scoring shots than Collingwood." Hafey's comments to the media summed up how most would have felt about the result: "When the final siren sounds, you are usually up in the air or with your head bowed down... Today I did not know what to do, how to feel or where to look."

=== Scorecard ===
Grand final
Saturday, 24 September (2:30 pm)	Collingwood	drew with	North Melbourne	MCG (crowd: 108,224)	Stats
1.5 (11); 4.8 (32); 9.12 (66); 10.16 (76)	Q1; Q2; Q3; Final	4.4 (28); 4.10 (34); 4.15 (39); 9.22 (76)	Umpires: Robinson, Sutcliffe; Television broadcast: Seven Network
Moore 4, Kink 2, Dunne, Anderson, Shaw, Barham	Goals	Baker 6, Dench 2, Sutton
Thompson, Magro, Ireland, Wearmouth, Picken, Moore	Best	Tanner, Baker, Schimmelbusch, Alves, Dench, Keenan, Montgomery
Gott (knee)	Injuries
Shaw (striking)	Reports

== Grand final replay ==
1977 VFL Grand Final

Collingwood	North Melbourne
19.10 (124)	21.25 (151)
	1	2	3	4
COLL	3.4 (22)	8.7 (55)	12.7 (79)	19.10 (124)
NM	5.5 (35)	9.12 (66)	15.19 (109)	21.25 (151)
- Date: 1 October 1977
- Stadium: Melbourne Cricket Ground
- Attendance: 98,491
- Favourite: Collingwood
- Umpires: Robinson, Sutcliffe

Accolades
- Jock McHale Medallist: Ron Barassi (North Melbourne)

Broadcast in Australia
- Network: Seven Network
- Commentators: Peter Ewin; Lou Richards

=== Lead-up ===
Barassi announced an unchanged team for the replay, while Hafey brought in Chris Perry for the injured Gott.

Because the under-19s and reserves grand finals had already been staged and decided the previous Saturday, the VFL turned to third- and fourth-placed teams Hawthorn and Richmond to play a challenge match as a curtain-raiser. As an incentive for the teams to cut short their holidays, A$20,000 ($134,175 in 2023 terms) was offered as prize money ($12,500 [$83,859 in 2023 terms] of which would be awarded to the winning team); and, in an additional twist to encourage both teams to field their best players, third and fourth place would be up for grabs, meaning that if Hawthorn lost, they would forfeit third place. The incentives were sufficient for champion full-forward Peter Hudson to fly in from Tasmania (as he had done all season) to represent Hawthorn one last time, while Richmond selected four players from their reserves team which had won the grand final the previous week.

It turned out to be a resounding success for the VFL. The challenge match was a high-scoring thriller, with Hawthorn prevailing by three points—15.15 (105) to 15.12 (102). Hudson kicked seven goals, prompting coach David Parkin to comment to The Age he had "waited 11 years to see Peter Hudson win a game off his own boot like that." Leigh Matthews added three goals, while Kelvin Moore, Peter Knights and David O'Halloran were among the best for the Hawks. For Richmond, Bruce Monteath kicked six goals, and Bryan Wood, Merv Keane and Graham Gaunt were considered best afield.

=== First quarter ===
The ground and weather conditions were again perfect as Dench won the toss for North Melbourne and chose to kick to the Punt Road end of the ground. North Melbourne was first to score with a behind to Baker and goal to Barry Cable. After Dunne's shot went out on the full, Collingwood drew level through a behind to Shaw and goal to Wayne Richardson eight minutes in, before hitting the front when Manassa was awarded a free directly in front and put through his first goal. Scores were again level soon after when Baker marked on a lead in front of Worthington and kicked his first goal, and then North Melbourne regained the lead when Briedis was twice involved in an attacking move, first by knocking forward a cross-field pass from teammate Montgomery, then following up the play and running into an open goal.

The Kangaroos added further goals when Blight grabbed the ball at a ball-up deep in North's forward line and scored his first goal with a quick left-foot snap. Minutes later, he followed up with a magnificent high mark from a Worthington kick-in and kicked the ball long to the goal square. Amidst the scrimmage of players, Crosswell managed to soccer the ball through on the goal line, and at the start of time-on North Melbourne held a 21-point lead. The Magpies fought to stay in the contest and were finally rewarded at the 30-minute mark when Magro's free kick to the top of the goal square was marked strongly by Moore, who converted his set shot for his first goal. Collingwood had a chance to make it two goals in a minute when, from the restarting bounce, Manassa took the ball cleanly out of the middle and kicked long towards Moore, only for Gumbleton to spoil the ball. On his second effort to clear the defence, Gumbleton knocked the ball straight to Barham, whose right foot snap was off target. In the heat of the moment, Barham had not seen teammate Kink on his own in the goal square. The siren sounded a short time later with North Melbourne leading by 13 points.

=== Second quarter ===
North Melbourne dominated play in the early minutes of the second term, winning the ball in the middle and marking strongly in attack, but were unable to capitalise on the scoreboard, kicking six behinds in six minutes. Baker broke the run of misses when he again marked strongly in front of his opponent after strong work by Steven Icke, whose agile play in attack was causing problems for the Collingwood defence, and judged the wind perfectly with his set shot to push the lead to 24 points.

Collingwood replied through Barham, who hit the post from a free kick in the forward pocket, and then scored its first goal of the quarter through Wearmouth, after some loose play from John Cassin. The Kangaroos steadied again when Briedis kicked his second goal after being awarded a free kick and a 15-metre penalty, and then backed up by crumbing a long kick into attack from Gary Cowton and handpassing to Tanner who ran in and kicked his first. When Cassin made up for his earlier mistake by snapping North Melbourne's third goal in a row after Picken had lost the ball playing for a free kick, the lead had grown to 36 points. Collingwood fought back for the remainder of the quarter, kicking the next four goals to narrow the half-time margin to eleven points.

=== Third quarter ===
North was able to briefly halt Collingwood's momentum when Baker's long-range set shot cleared the pack on the goal line to register his third goal for the match after being awarded a free for a push in the back. But the Magpies hit back with goals to Manassa (also awarded a free for a push in the back) and Kink, who somehow managed to get boot to ball as it was bouncing toward the goal square, cutting the margin to five points six minutes into the quarter.

Goals continued to be traded when Briedis, who was prominent during the third quarter in building North's advantage, replied with his third goal from a set shot deep in the left forward pocket before Icke added another major with a snap shot from the same area. Collingwood replied with a running goal to Wayne Gordon and at the 17-minute mark had another chance to close to within a goal when Kink marked within scoring range, but strangely chose to attempt a short pass which was cut off by the North defenders.

The rest of the quarter belonged to the Kangaroos; their superb pressure and rebounding from defence resulted in goals to Byrne, Crosswell and Briedis before Anderson revived hope for Collingwood supporters by converting his set shot at the 29-minute mark. The siren sounded a few minutes later, with North holding a 30-point lead.

=== Final quarter ===
North extended its lead in the opening minute when the hard-running Schimmelbusch capped off a superb chain of handpasses (one of which he had given) by running into an open goal. With North Melbourne holding a 25-point lead with over ten minutes remaining, Manassa kicked a memorable goal to narrow the margin to 19 points. North Melbourne had just added a rushed behind to its score, and Gordon was unable to complete a high mark from the kick-in, but at ground level he was able to tap the ball into the path of oncoming teammate Manassa, who picked up the ball and ran with it down the members wing, taking three bounces, faking a handball to elude an oncoming North Melbourne defender, bouncing one more time before steadying and kicking a goal from angled drop punt from 45 metres, bringing the margin back to 19 points with more than ten minutes remaining. This goal has since been commemorated by the AFL, who award the Phil Manassa Medal to the winner of the annual Goal of the Year. Manassa's goal had kept Collingwood in the game, but they were not able to make up the difference. When the final siren sounded, North Melbourne won the grand final.

=== Aftermath ===
Briedis was considered best on ground by the football writers from The Age, who used a Brownlow voting system to judge their best player, tallying eight out of a possible nine votes; he had managed to put the previous week's troubles behind him (he registered seven behinds from ten scoring shots), by kicking five goals (the second time he had done so in a grand final for the Kangaroos) and contributing to many more with 30 disposals (19 kicks and 11 handpasses) and nine marks. Malcolm Blight was voted player of the match by the panel of football writers from the Sun News-Pictorial, who also used a Brownlow voting system.

For Collingwood, the three stand-out individual performances were from Peter Moore, who backed up his four goals in the previous week's drawn game with five goals from limited chances, champion ruckman Len Thompson, who repeated his excellent around-the-ground effort, and Phil Manassa, who while being remembered for his memorable last-quarter goal, also gathered 21 possessions, 18 of them kicks. A panel which viewed the replay retrospectively for the AFL Record's grand final edition in 2001 voted Arnold Briedis as the best player, with Xavier Tanner and John Byrne also receiving votes for their performances.

Barassi, in the fourth and final coaching premiership of his career, paid tribute to his players for having become the first team to win the VFL premiership after playing five finals in five weeks:

The win had to be one of the gutsiest sporting performances I've seen. I know I'm biased, but the depth of character, and spirit was tremendous. They refused to knuckle under pressure, refused to be tired, refused to let the nerves get on top of them.

In his Monday report for The Age, Mike Sheahan praised North Melbourne's attitude and tactical intelligence and cited Collingwood's lack of depth as the main cause for defeat:

North's 27-point win over Collingwood reflected a considerable measure of talent, even more discipline and an inspiring spirit. [...] Collingwood lost because too much was left to too few for the second week in a row. There is no place to hide poor players on the big MCG on Grand Final day, and Collingwood had at least six poor players. Barassi had more contributors, and he exploited the advantage by winning the tactical battle with Hafey, the man who had won their previous two Grand Final clashes before this year.

North Melbourne made it to the grand final again the following year, marking its sixth successive appearance, but lost to Hawthorn. Collingwood contested the subsequent three grand finals in 1979, 1980 and 1981 and lost all three. Collingwood eventually broke its premiership drought in 1990, while North Melbourne had to wait until 1996 to win its next premiership.

=== Scorecard ===
Grand final replay
Saturday, 1 October (2:30 pm)	Collingwood	def. by	North Melbourne	MCG (crowd: 98,491)	Stats
3.4 (22); 8.7 (55); 12.7 (79); 19.10 (124)	Q1; Q2; Q3; Final	5.5 (35); 9.12 (66); 15.19 (109); 21.25 (151)	Umpires: Robinson, Sutcliffe; Television broadcast: Seven Network
Moore 5, Manassa 3, Barham, Dunne, Gordon 2, Kink, Wearmouth, W. Richardson, Anderson, Ireland	Goals	Briedis 5, Baker 3, Crosswell, Cable, Blight, Schimmelbusch, Byrne 2, Icke, Tanner, Cassin
Moore, Manassa, Thompson, Hyde, Wearmouth, Ireland	Best	Briedis, Tanner, Blight, Byrne, Cable, Henshaw, Icke, Montgomery
Nil	Reports	Baker (striking)
Gate takings $586,515

== Teams ==
North Melbourne	Collingwood

North Melbourne
B:	34 Ross Henshaw	23 David Dench (a/c)	30 Frank Gumbleton
HB:	13 Gary Cowton	5 Darryl Sutton	12 Ken Montgomery
C:	2 Stan Alves	25 Xavier Tanner	20 Wayne Schimmelbusch (a/vc)
HF:	36 Steven Icke	15 Malcolm Blight	6 Arnold Briedis
F:	8 Brent Crosswell	29 Phil Baker	3 John Cassin
Foll:	1 Peter Keenan	21 John Byrne	9 Barry Cable
Res:	16 Stephen McCann	35 Bill Nettlefold	
Coach:	Ron Barassi		

Collingwood
B:	38 Robert Hyde (dvc)	27 Kevin Worthington	34 Doug Gott / 7 Chris Perry*
HB:	24 Andrew Ireland	25 Billy Picken	31 Phil Manassa
C:	43 Ricky Barham	3 Stan Magro	13 Wayne Gordon
HF:	18 Wayne Richardson	12 Ross Dunne	21 Graeme Anderson
F:	30 Peter Moore	36 Rene Kink	23 Ray Shaw
Foll:	2 Len Thompson (vc)	1 Max Richardson (c)	5 Ronald Wearmouth
Res:	11 Gerald Betts	15 Shane Bond	
Coach:	Tom Hafey		

* Chris Perry replaced Doug Gott (knee) for the grand final replay

Umpires

The umpiring panel for the match, comprising two field umpires, two boundary umpires and two goal umpires is given below. The same umpires officiated in both the drawn Grand Final and the Replay.

1977 VFL grand final umpires
Position			Emergency
Field:	Ian Robinson (3,4)	John Sutcliffe (1,2)	
Boundary:	Kevin Mitchell (7,8)	Leigh Paterson (1,2)	
Goal:	Kevin Barker (2,3)	Leslie Robinson (4,5)	

Numbers in brackets represent the number of grand finals umpired, including 1977.

== Bibliography ==
- Atkinson, Graeme; Atkinson, Brant (2009). The Complete Book of AFL Finals (4th ed.). Scoresby, Victoria: The Five Mile Press. ISBN 9781742112756.
- Dowsing, Jeff (2015). Collingwood's 50 Most Sensational Games (ePUB). ISBN 9781458168610.
- Slattery, Geoff, ed. (September 2012). Grand finals : the stories behind the premier teams of the Victorian Football League, 1939-1978. Vol. 2. Richmond, Victoria: The Slattery Media Group. ISBN 9781921778612.

== See also ==
- 1977 VFL season
- 1948 VFL grand final
- 2010 AFL Grand Final
