= Ian Robinson (Australian football umpire) =

Australian rules football field umpire

Personal information
- Born: 20 August 1946 (age 80)
- Debut: Round 1, 1971, Melbourne vs. South Melbourne, at MCG
- Other occupation: University Professor

Umpiring career
| Years | League | Role | Games |
| 1971–1987 | Victorian Football League (VFL) | field | 344 |

Career highlights
- 9× VFL grand final umpire: 1973, 1974, 1977, 1977 replay, 1978, 1980, 1981, 1985, 1987; Bishop Shield: 1987; Australian Football Hall of Fame, inducted 1996; AFL Umpires Association Team of the Century, selected 2002; AFL Umpires Association Hall of Fame, inducted 2008

Ian Robinson (born 20 August 1946) is a former Australian rules football field umpire who officiated in the Victorian Football League (VFL).

At the time of his retirement from umpiring in 1987, Robinson held the VFL record for most senior games officiated as a field umpire (344), of which nine were VFL grand finals, second only to Jack Elder.

Throughout his career, and later as an umpiring coach and administrator, Robinson was a first-hand witness to some notable on-field incidents in tumultuous periods of the sport's history, and his achievements have been recognised with induction in both the Australian Football Hall of Fame and the AFL Umpires Association Hall of Fame.

== Umpiring career ==
Robinson first joined the umpiring club at University High School in 1961 as a 15-year-old. He then joined the VFL senior umpiring panel in 1969.

In August 1970, Robinson made it onto the back pages of The Age when it was reported that he had fallen ill while umpiring the reserves match between St Kilda and Melbourne at VFL Park. He had reported two players, and revealed that he was not feeling well at half-time. After the match, he was examined by both club doctors before being taken to Allendale Private Hospital by ambulance. He was discharged the following day.

Robinson made his senior VFL umpiring debut in round 1 of the 1971 VFL season in the game between Melbourne and South Melbourne at the MCG, which the Demons won comfortably by 105 points. Two years later, after umpiring in 18 matches during the home-and-away rounds of the 1973 VFL season, Robinson was selected to officiate his first VFL final—the qualifying final between arch-rivals Carlton and Richmond at the MCG, which Carlton won by 20 points. After also umpiring the first semi-final which Carlton again won by 20 points, Robinson was selected to umpire the 1973 VFL grand final.

Robinson umpired his third (and fourth) grand finals in 1977, this time in tandem with John Sutcliffe. In what became the second drawn grand final in VFL history, Robinson reported Collingwood's Ray Shaw in the first quarter for deliberately striking North defender Ken Montgomery in the stomach with a clenched right fist; Shaw would be cleared to play in the replay the following week. Robinson was also the umpire who awarded the mark in the dying seconds of the game to Ross Dunne, enabling him to level the scores. As Robinson recalled:

I saw the pack go up and I knew I had to stay focused. It was a huge pack but I saw one pair of hands get a clear purchase on the ball. I blew my whistle...I was determined to keep my concentration focused as I ran in and watched those arms and the ball all the way to the ground. I called ‘It's yours’, and saw it was Ross Dunne who had taken the mark. I do rate it as one of my best decisions. If you don't see it, you don't pay it. I saw it.

The 1987 season would turn out to be Robinson's last as a senior VFL umpire. It was a busy one, too, with Robinson officiating in every round of the home-and-away season and also serving as president of the VFL Umpires Association. The final two VFL matches he would officiate in—the 1987 preliminary final and grand final—provided a number of memorable moments, some of which Robinson was directly involved in.

The preliminary final between Melbourne (participating in its first VFL finals series since 1964) and reigning premiers Hawthorn at VFL Park is remembered mainly for its controversial ending; for three quarters the Hawks had struggled against the breeze and the Demons had built a 22-point lead going into the last change. In the last quarter, Melbourne had several clear-cut chances to seal the game but was unable to capitalise, while Hawthorn had kicked three goals to bring the margin back to four points. The Demons' young ruckman Jim Stynes then conceded a 15-metre penalty in the dying seconds of the game by running through the mark, allowing Hawks forward Gary Buckenara to kick the winning goal after the siren and send Hawthorn through to the grand final the following week.

The grand final, which Robinson co-officiated with Rowan Sawers (who would eventually overtake Robinson's games record in 1995), was memorable for its unusual beginning; as the opening siren sounded, Carlton midfielder Wayne Johnston became aware that Hawthorn had five players stationed in the centre square (the rules only allow a maximum of four per team) and pointed this out to Robinson as he was about to take the opening bounce. Robinson blew his whistle to start the game, and handed the ball to Johnston to take the free kick. Minutes later, he would report Johnston for striking Hawthorn wingman Robert DiPierdomenico, as well as reporting Carlton ruckman Justin Madden for striking Hawthorn captain Michael Tuck.

== Post-umpiring career ==
Immediately following retirement, Robinson remained active in umpiring circles, being appointed to the VFL's umpire coaching panel alongside renowned colleagues Bill Deller and Kevin Smith.

Early in the 1988 VFL season, the panel summoned umpire Ian Clayton following a controversial incident in which Melbourne's Rod Grinter hit Terry Wallace (who had just begun a stint with Footscray) in the face with his forearm, resulting in Wallace suffering from concussion and a broken jaw. Grinter also required hospitalisation when one of Wallace's teeth became embedded in his hand and later became infected. The panel questioned Clayton about the incident and why Grinter had not been reported. Clayton was subsequently demoted to umpiring in the Ovens and Murray Football League before returning to VFL duty later in the season, and Grinter eventually was suspended for six weeks.

In 2004, in a bid to improve the consistency of tribunal rulings, the AFL appointed Robinson to the new position of video reporting officer, becoming the sole person responsible for laying charges based on video evidence, a job that had been previously assigned to the field umpires.

== Honours ==
In 1988, Robinson received the VFL Umpires Association's Lifetime Achievement Award.

When the Australian Football Hall of Fame was established in 1996 to celebrate the centenary of the VFL/AFL, Robinson was listed, along with ten other umpires, among its inaugural inductees.

== Personal life ==
Outside of football, Robinson has worked as a university professor specialising in computer science. He graduated with a Bachelor of Science and PhD from the University of Melbourne and lectured there until moving to La Trobe University in 1975, being one of the original staff members when the Department of Computer Science was formed two years later at the Bundoora campus. In, 2002 Robinson held the title of associate professor at the Department of Computer Science and Computer Engineering, as well as Deputy Dean of the Faculty of Science, Technology and Engineering.

== Bibliography ==
- Dowsing, Jeff (2015). Collingwood's 50 Most Sensational Games (ePUB). ISBN 9781458168610.
- Ross, John (1999). The Australian Football Hall of Fame. Australia: HarperCollinsPublishers. p. 140. ISBN 0-7322-6426-X.
