= Dale Weightman =

Australian rules footballer (born 1959)

Personal information
- Nickname: Flea
- Born: 3 October 1959 (age 67)
- Original team: Mildura Imperials
- Debut: 1 April 1978, Richmond vs. Carlton, at M.C.G.
- Height: 170 cm (5 ft 7 in)
- Weight: 69 kg (152 lb)

Playing career^{1}
Years	Club	Games (Goals)
1978–1993	Richmond	274 (344)

Representative team honours
Years	Team	Games (Goals)
1980–1991	Victoria	20 (31)
- ^{1} Playing statistics correct to the end of 1993.

Career highlights
- VFL Premiership player: (1980); 3× All-Australian team: (1985, 1986, 1988); 2× Jack Dyer Medal: (1986, 1987); Richmond captain: (1988–1992); 2× E. J. Whitten Medal: (1986, 1990); Tassie Medal: (1985); Simpson Medal: (1985); Australian Football Hall of Fame, inducted 2001; Richmond Team of the Century; Richmond Hall of Fame; Australian National Football Carnival Championship: 1980

Dale Weightman (born 3 October 1959) is a former Australian rules footballer who played for the Richmond Football Club in the Australian Football League (AFL).

Affectionately known as 'The Flea', Weightman was recognised as one of the finest rovers of his era, with his aggression, courage, evasive skills and constructive handpassing being key features of his play. He experienced success at the beginning of his playing career, but won respect at Richmond for staying loyal to the club during their crisis period in the late 1980s. He also represented Victoria with distinction in interstate matches. Weightman also became the last remaining player born in the 1950s to have played in the VFL/AFL, his last game being the final round of the 1993 season.

Weightman's achievements in the game for both club and state were recognised when he was named in Richmond's Team of the Century and Hall of Fame, and in 2001 as a member of the Australian Football Hall of Fame.

== Early years ==
Weightman is one of six children born to Brian "Reggie" Weightman and his first wife Maureen, and has three brothers and two sisters. Brian (who died in 2020) was a local sporting icon, excelling in Australian rules football and cricket. He played 289 games with the Mildura Imperials in the Sunraysia Football League, winning six club best and fairests and playing in four premierships. He later coached various junior football teams and was recognised for his service to various local sporting associations with life membership.

Weightman would follow in his father's footsteps at the Imperials, playing for the junior teams and winning competition best and fairest awards at under 15 and under 17 level, as well as three consecutive premierships. At this time, the north west of Victoria was zoned exclusively to Richmond. The Tigers relocated Weightman to Melbourne in 1977, when he was 17. He enrolled at Melbourne High School and played for the school team, which won the schoolboy "Herald Shield". These matches were played as curtain raisers to the VFL's Tuesday night series games. Weightman first came under notice in this series. Meanwhile, on Saturdays, he turned out for the Tigers' under 19 side, and played as first rover in the team's victory against Fitzroy in the Grand Final.

== Senior Football Career ==
Weightman was selected for his senior debut in the opening round of 1978 against arch-rivals Carlton at the MCG, along with John Einsiedel and Greg Strachan, who had been a premiership teammate of Weightman the previous season and would also be part of the senior premiership side two years later. Weightman was named in the forward pocket as second rover to club champion Kevin Bartlett, and joined a special group of VFL/AFL players to score a goal with their first kick. He would kick three for the afternoon and gather 12 disposals in a 77-point victory, impressing with his pace and ball use. However, he quickly found himself back in the reserves when the team's fortune slumped. This was the pattern for his first two seasons before his career turned around in 1980. After several years in the wilderness, Richmond returned to form due to the improvement of a number of young players such as Weightman. He was now sharing the roving duties with West Australian Robert Wiley. The Tigers stormed through the home-and-away season, winning 11 consecutive games from Round 4 to 14 and missing out on the minor premiership only after losing to South Melbourne in the final round. Richmond would finish third on the ladder, with the highest total points aggregate (their 2,754 points falling just shy of the record set by Carlton the previous season) and also the best percentage. The third-placed finish meant they would have to face Carlton in the Qualifying final at VFL Park.

In a game significant for Kevin Bartlett breaking the then VFL games record and a quarter-time confrontation between coaches Peter Jones and Tony Jewell, Weightman gathered 21 disposals and kicked four goals to be among the Tigers' best players in a 42-point win. Weightman was named starting rover in the 1980 Grand Final, and kicked the first goal of the game at the 5-minute mark after making position in open space up the ground to mark a pass from Jim Jess, then playing on and steering his shot through from a slight angle. He ended the game with 20 disposals (14 of them handpasses) and was rated among Richmond's best players on the day. In the post season, he won Victorian selection for the first time.

However, in a sign of the decade that was to come, Richmond were unable to repeat their success in 1981. They spent much of the season hovering between fifth and seventh position on the ladder, and needed to beat arch-rivals Carlton in the final home-and-away round to have any chance of snatching fifth spot from Fitzroy. In a low-scoring game at the MCG, Carlton emerged victorious by 27 points and the Tigers ended the season in seventh position. One of the rare highlights of the season was the Round 12 win against South Melbourne at VFL Park, which was club champion Francis Bourke's 300th game. Five minutes into the last quarter, Jewell sprang a surprise move by dragging Michael Roach and replacing him at full forward with Jim Jess. Down 22 points at this stage, the Tigers then kicked nine goals to run out 15-point winners. Weightman was among Richmond's best players that day; he and fellow small man Robert Wiley combined for 69 disposals – Weightman was credited with 36 of those (which included 24 handpasses) and kicked three goals.

Francis Bourke took over from Jewell as coach and Richmond finished the season on top of the ladder. Weightman played well in the losing 1982 VFL Grand Final against Carlton.

1983 began in tumultuous fashion when champion centreman Geoff Raines demanded a clearance. The Tigers lost their first five games and would never recover, spending much of the year in second-last position and eventually finishing tenth only after beating Sydney at the SCG in Round 21.

Former premiership ruckman Mike Patterson was appointed Bourke's replacement but would only last for one season. The Tigers improved on their previous season's form, finishing eighth with ten wins, but the bitter ongoing recruiting war with Collingwood continued to hurt the club financially. In the Round 16 loss to Hawthorn at VFL Park, Weightman was one of Richmond's best with 22 disposals and three goals, but was reported by field umpire David Howlett for allegedly striking Russell Greene with the right elbow to the head in the first quarter. He pleaded not guilty at the VFL tribunal hearing, but was suspended for two matches.

1991 was another disappointing season for Richmond. However, there were a few bright moments. In the Round 8 match, later dubbed the 'Mother's Day Massacre', Richmond caused one of the upsets of the season against the reigning premiers Collingwood. After it appeared the Magpies were headed for victory, kicking seven goals in the first quarter to lead by 16 points, the Tigers then kicked 20 goals to 8 to run out 57-point winners. Jeff Hogg kicked a career-best ten goals, and Weightman played a captain's game, combining with Craig Lambert and Matthew Knights to set up many scoring chances; he was credited with 33 disposals (18 kicks, 15 handpasses) and also kicked two goals.

1993 began promisingly for Richmond, with former player John Northey returning as coach after taking Melbourne to five finals series, and Jeff Hogg appointed as new captain. The Tigers qualified for the 1993 Foster's Cup Grand Final but lost to Essendon. It would turn out to be a false dawn, and after losing to Adelaide by 94 points in the opening round, Richmond would finish the season second-last with four wins.

In the Round 13 match against Collingwood at the MCG, Weightman was reported by emergency umpire Coates for allegedly striking Paul Williams with a left forearm to the head in the final quarter. He pleaded guilty at the Tribunal hearing and was suspended for three weeks. There had been talk of Weightman retiring if the suspension had been lengthy, but at the tribunal press conference he vowed to continue aiming to reach 300 games.

Weightman represented the Australian state of Victoria, and was state captain in 1987 and 1988 v Western Australia, and against New South Wales in 1990. Overall, he played a total of 20 State of Origin games. It was said he played some of his best football for the State and was one of those rare players - the better the standard the better he would play. His other honours include winning the 1985 Tassie Medal for best player in the State of Origin series and the 1985 Simpson Medal for best player in the Western Australia v Victoria match played in Perth.

== Life After Retirement ==
Weightman is a type 1 diabetic, however this has not stopped him from being active, and in 2005, Weightman continued to have an impact in the EJ Whitten Legends Game at the Telstra Dome with competitors that were mostly around five or six years his junior. He also participated in the 2006 match. Weightman continues to be a regular face at the Richmond Football Club, and has been one of the Richmond runners on match day on and off for the past few years.

In January 2017, it was reported that Weightman had collapsed due to a drop in his blood sugar level and fractured his left ankle during an early morning round of golf in Mildura. He had emergency surgery to remove some bone and insert screws into the ankle before spending a further 7 weeks in a moon boot.

== Bibliography ==
- Hogan P: The Tigers Of Old, Richmond FC, Melbourne 1996
