= Goal of the Year (AFL) =

Australian rules football award

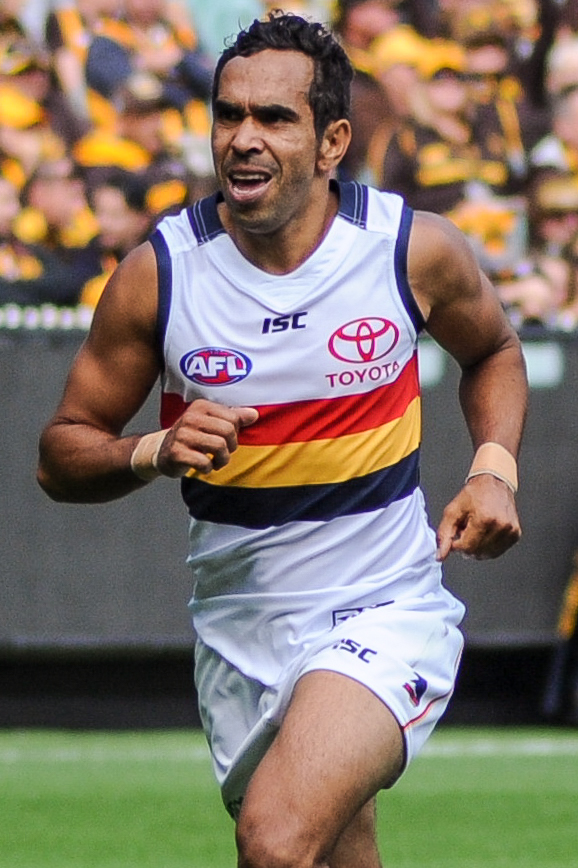
Eddie Betts has won Goal of the Year on a record four occasions – once for Carlton (2006) and thrice for Adelaide (2015, 2016 and 2019)

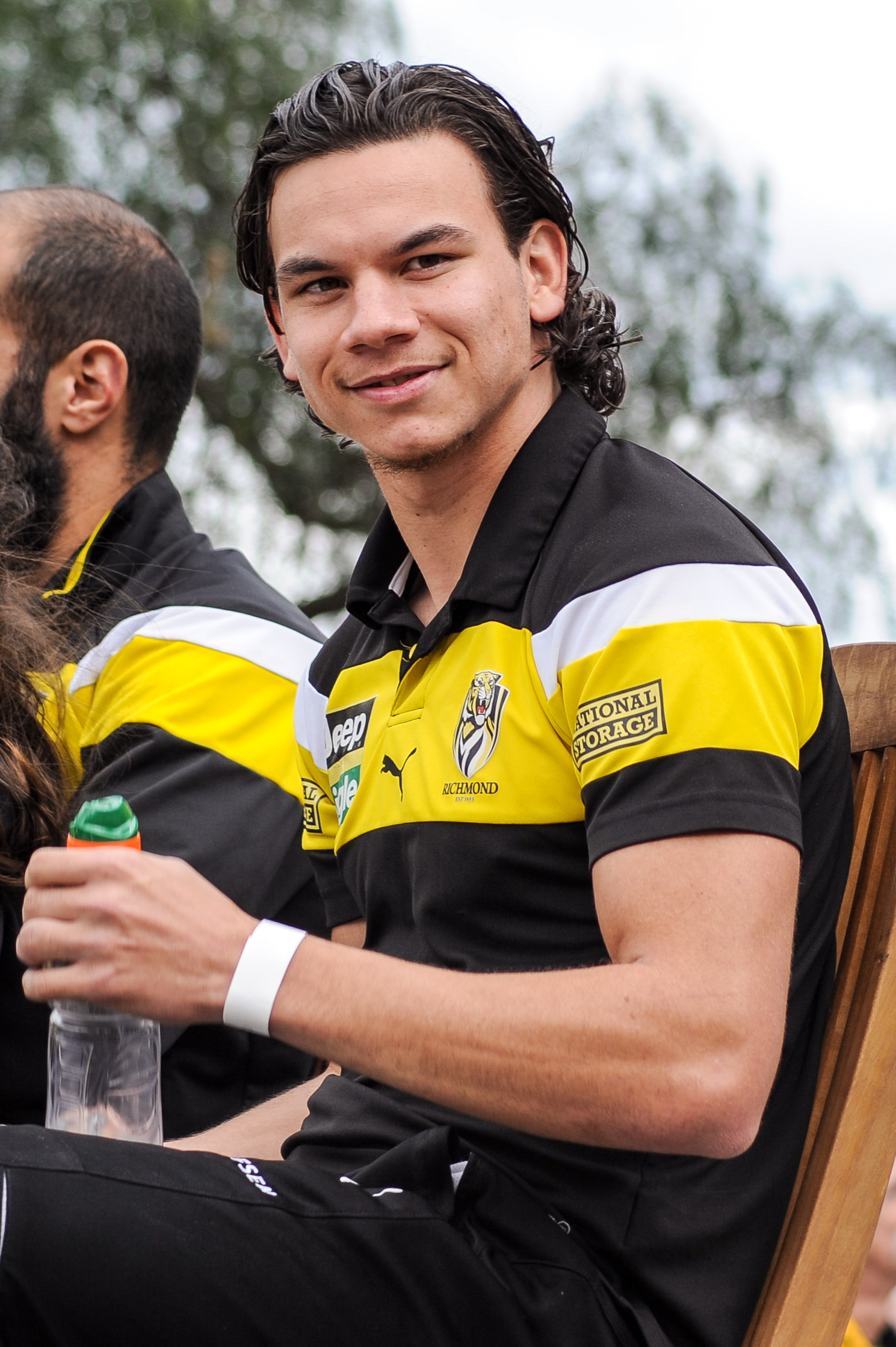
Daniel Rioli (Richmond) was awarded the 2017 Goal of the Year.

The Goal of the Year is a competition for the best goal kicked in the Australian Football League (AFL) during that season. It is run in conjunction with the Mark of the Year competition and is currently sponsored by Rebel Sport. The winner is awarded the Phil Manassa Medal. The concept of awards for the goal and mark of the year is thought to have been initiated in 1970, as an unofficial award given by the media to Alex Jesaulenko following his famous mark in that season's grand final. The official awards were first given in 2001. Eddie Betts has been awarded Goal of the Year on an unparalleled four occasions (2006, 2015, 2016 and 2019), the most of any player, and is the only player to win the award in consecutive seasons.

== Selection process ==
Each week, three of the best goals of the round are selected as nominees. A panel of AFL selectors choose the winning goal of the round.

For the first time in 2006, the general public were able to vote for nominated goals via the AFL's website. The results of the public voting are combined with the panel's votes. Any one of the goals judged to be the best of the round are able to win the official Goal of the Year.

At the conclusion of the AFL home and away season, the AFL Game Analysis Committee will select the best three goals from a selection of 30 (the 25 round winners, along with 5 other contenders as determined by AFL Media). The best three will be based on a 5/4/3/2/1 vote given by each member of the selection committee. Voting will open after the AFL home and away season for the AFL Goal of the Year and the overall winner will be selected by the AFL Game Analysis Committee (counted as 10 votes) and by public voting (counted as 1 vote). The winning player of the AFL Goal of the Year will be announced at the Brownlow Medal.

Goal of the Year is generally awarded to a player who creates and scores a difficult goal in play; it has never been, and is unlikely to ever be, awarded to a goal kicked from a set shot. Historically, it has been the quality of the creation of the goal which determines the winner, rather than the difficulty of the shot itself. As such, simply kicking a goal from the boundary line will not guarantee a player Goal of the Year, but if they have roved the ball cleanly off a pack (like Jason Akermanis in 2002) or won the ball by stealing or smothering it from an opponent (like Peter Bosustow in 1981), then they will generally come into Goal of the Year calculations. Players are also often rewarded for orchestrating a long run down the field which ends with a big goal on the run: Daniel Kerr in 2003 and Michael McGuane in 1994 are memorable examples.

Many of the best goals in the VFL/AFL were featured in a VHS/DVD named Golden Goals.

== VFL/AFL ==
Player is still active in AFL
Player also won Mark of the Year for the same year

Season	Winner	Team	Description	Ref/video
1976	Keith Greig	North Melbourne		
1977	Phil Manassa	Collingwood	Manassa kicked a goal on the run from the half back flank in the 1977 Grand Final replay against North Melbourne,	
1978	Rod Ashman (ABC)	Carlton	Ashman receives the ball near the left forward pocket at Moorabbin from a ruck contest and kicks a left foot goal on the run, into the breeze, from around 30–40 metres out.	
1978	Phil Baker	North Melbourne		
1979	Leigh Matthews	Hawthorn	Took several detours to avoid North Melbourne opposition to score from the pocket in the first VFL game in Sydney since 1952.	
1979	Stan Alves (ABC)	North Melbourne	Round 17. Evades two Richmond opponents and kicks a right foot goal from approximately 40 metres out.	
1980	Michael Turner (ABC)	Geelong	Three bounces and one baulk from the wing and a shot from 50 metres.	
1981	Peter Bosustow	Carlton	Smothered his Geelong opponent's attempted clearing kick 20 metres around in the right forward pocket at VFL Park before standing, gathering and snapping a high goal over his right shoulder.	
1981	David Twomey (ABC)	Collingwood	On a wet day he collects the ball at half-back and takes 3 bounces before kicking the goal.	
1982	Malcolm Blight (ABC)	North Melbourne	Blight drops a contested mark on the right wing, recovers the resulting loose ball, baulks two opponents at once, and then kicks a goal from the right forward flank boundary line about 40 metres out with his non-preferred left foot.	
1983	Paul Meldrum (ABC)	Carlton	Meldrum gathers the ball in the forward pocket at Waverley Park and evades 4 Essendon player tackles to snap a goal	
1983	Michael Conlan (Seven)	Fitzroy	Conlan receives the ball at half-forward, baulks two Carlton players to kick his goal.	
1984	Geoff Raines	Collingwood		
1984	Michael Conlan (ABC)	Fitzroy	Conlan taps the ball back into play close to the right boundary line pocket at Waverley Park, then receives a follow-up handball (from over his head) from teammate Wilson, then rides a bump against Trevor Barker and kicks a left foot snap 15 metres out.	
1985	Andrew Bews	Geelong	A long run at Kardinia Park in which Bews baulked two would-be tacklers and bounced three times; 40 m out from goal, Bews attempted to touch the ball on the ground, fumbled and overran the ball before changing direction, recovering the ball and eventually slotting the goal from 30 m.	
1985	Greg Burns (ABC)	St Kilda	At Victoria Park, Burns marks on the wing, takes three bounces, evades a diving Fitzroy opponent at half forward, bounces again, weaves past a pack of Fitzroy and St Kilda player and kicks a left foot goal from about 40 metres out.	
1986	Phil Krakouer (Seven) (ABC)	North Melbourne	Grabbed ball on the boundary line and ran around Frank Dunell before kicking a sensational goal from the boundary with his left foot. (Also was Runner-up this year)	
1987	David Murphy (ABC)	Sydney Swans	After the Swans scored a behind, Murphy took a spectacular mark over an opponent's back from a long kick-in; he then quickly played on and kicked truly from more than 50 m away at an acute angle (from the left side).	
1988	Matthew Larkin	North Melbourne	Spun around three West Coast players, snapping miraculously from the pocket.	
1989	Gary Ablett Sr.	Geelong	Dropped a contested mark in the middle of the ground and then ran onto the loose ball at full speed, bursting into the forward line and snapping truly from 50 m vs Collingwood (MCG).	
1990	Michael Mitchell	Richmond	Gathered the ball in his own defensive area and set off on a blistering 70-metre run through the centre of the Sydney Cricket Ground, escaping a number of would-be tacklers and taking seven bounces before kicking truly from 35 metres out.	
1991	Peter Daicos	Collingwood	Baulk and snap from the pocket vs. Richmond at Victoria Park.	
1992	Darryl White	Brisbane Bears	Baulked an opponent and kicked into the forward line, only for teammate to drop the mark. White followed up and scooped up the ball, baulked another opponent and kicked a goal from 30 metres out.	
1993	Michael Long	Essendon	Ran and bounced several times for a controversial goal in the 1993 Grand Final. It was allegedly touched on the line by Carlton full-back Stephen Silvagni, who to this day claims he touched it before sailing through for a goal.	
1994	Mick McGuane	Collingwood	In one of the most famous of all time, oft compared to Phil Manassa's famous 1977 Grand Final run, McGuane had a total of seven bounces from the centre square, baulking two tackle attempts before kicking truly from 30 m at the MCG against Carlton.	
1995	Tony Modra	Adelaide	Kicked the ball off the ground 35 m from goal; his scrubbed kick rolled to the forward pocket, finishing at the feet of Richmond full back Stuart Wigney. Modra followed up his kick, making up 30 metres of ground to soccer the ball away from Wigney, gather the loose ball, and then snap a beautiful goal from 20 metres out hard on the boundary.	
1996	Jeff Farmer	Melbourne	Farmer gathers the ball 20 metres from goal, evades two tackles in quick succession and kicks a right foot banana goal.	
1997	Austinn Jones	St Kilda	Ran hard from defensive 50 and took several bounces along the wing, handballed to Andrew Thompson at forward 50, received the ball back and snapped a spectacular goal in the 1997 AFL Grand Final.	
1998	Jeff Farmer	Melbourne	Farmer collected the ball in the defensive 50 and, running the length of the ground, passed the ball off and received it back twice, evaded multiple opposition players, and kicked a torpedo goal from 55 metres out close to the boundary line.	
1999	Jarrod Molloy	Brisbane Lions	Molloy picks up the ball just outside 50m near the boundary, and on the run handballs out in front, then taps the ball onto a teammate before running on to receive the handball, and kicking a right foot checkside from the pocket.	
2000	Kingsley Hunter	Western Bulldogs	Running from the defensive 50, he kept going and laid a handball off to Scott Wynd, received it back at centre wing, lined up from forward 50 and slotted it home (was awarded on Rex Hunt's Footy Panel).	
Official winners
2001	Mark Merenda	West Coast Eagles	Paddled the ball from outside 50 along the boundary line towards goal and snapped it through from the pocket against St. Kilda at the Telstra Dome.	
2002	Jason Akermanis	Brisbane Lions	A snap shot from 45 metres out on his non-preferred left boot, along the boundary line while turning around to the left of the goals against Carlton at the Gabba in Round 14.	
2003	Daniel Kerr	West Coast Eagles	Received the football at half-back, before taking 5 bounces and finishing from 48 m out, late in a famous Derby against Fremantle.	
2004	Daniel Wells	Kangaroos	Described as "Jackie Chan in mid-air", Wells leapt into the air, grabbed the ball out of the ruck and kicked in one motion in the goal square at Subiaco, giving North Melbourne a narrow victory over Fremantle.	
2005	Chris Judd	West Coast Eagles	Burst from a boundary throw in on the half forward flank, spun out of a tackle and kicked truly from about 40 metres out at Subiaco oval.	
2006	Eddie Betts	Carlton	Smothered Tarkyn Lockyer's handball, gathered the ball and, with two opposition players surrounding him, kicked a freakish banana from the boundary and kicked truly.	
2007	Matthew Lloyd	Essendon	Matthew Lloyd back-heeled the goal through a pack of players from 5 metres out in an innovative unorthodox drop kick in a moment of quick thinking.	
2008	Leon Davis	Collingwood	In the final home-and-away Friday night match, Leon Davis tackled Fremantle player Des Headland in Fremantle's defensive 50 and knocked the ball out of the scruffle; as he picked the ball up, he broke a tackle and then ran 10 metres before kicking an amazing drop punt from 50 m out on the boundary. Dennis Cometti adding the words "of the season" after Bruce McAvaney called out "goal".	
2009	Cyril Rioli	Hawthorn	In the Round 7 match against Essendon, Rioli managed to evade numerous defenders to weave his way into a position to handball to teammate Chance Bateman before receiving the ball back and kicking a goal from 40 metres out.	
2010	Lance Franklin	Hawthorn	Round 13 goal against Essendon at the MCG, where Franklin outsprinted Cale Hooker from the wing to boot truly from around 50 metres out from near the left boundary line (Franklin is left-footed, making the angle even more acute)	
2011	Hayden Ballantyne	Fremantle	Round 2 goal against Geelong at Subiaco Oval. Ballantyne ran through the centre of the ground before kicking the ball inside 50. He received a follow-up handball from Matthew Pavlich and slotted the goal from 40 metres out in a team-lifting effort.	
2012	Chris Yarran	Carlton	Round 1 goal against Richmond at the MCG. Received a handball from Chris Judd between left wing and half-forward flank. Ran along the boundary past Richmond opponents Dustin Martin, Ivan Maric and Steven Morris, Yarran broke tackles from Maric and Morris before slotting the game-changing goal from 40 metres out.	
2013	Lance Franklin	Hawthorn	Round 3 goal against Collingwood at the MCG. Received a handball from Ben Stratton in the centre square, jumped over a tackled Stratton and went on to kick the goal from 75 metres out.	
2014	Matthew White	Port Adelaide	Round 17 goal against Richmond at Etihad Stadium. White gathered the ball at half-back, ran full tilt up the wing with three bounces, burning off a chasing Steven Morris in the process, before unloading from 50m to goal.	
2015	Eddie Betts	Adelaide	Round 9 goal against Fremantle at Adelaide Oval. Kicked inside-out with his left foot from the left-hand boundary from nearly 50 metres out on the boundary line. The ball was expertly swung in the air to bounce through an unguarded goal square.	
2016	Eddie Betts	Adelaide	Round 10 goal against Greater Western Sydney at Adelaide Oval. Betts successfully trapped and gathered the ball on the boundary line 50m out from goal after a spoiled marking contest. Betts then evades two GWS players before kicking a goal with a right foot snap from 35m out.	
2017	Daniel Rioli	Richmond	Round 3 goal against West Coast at the MCG, Rioli successfully kept the ball in bounds up against the boundary line and kicked a right foot banana on the run 35m out from goal.	
2018	Jack Higgins	Richmond	Round 19 goal against Collingwood at the MCG; under pressure and standing behind the goal line but keeping the ball in play, Higgins dropped the ball around the goal post and kicked it backwards over his head	
2019	Eddie Betts	Adelaide	Round 5 goal against Gold Coast at Adelaide Oval. In his 300th game, Betts kicked a classic left-footed banana from about 30 metres out on the boundary line of the same left hand pocket as his 2015 and 2016 Goal of the Year winners.	
2020	Josh Daicos	Collingwood	Round 10 goal against Sydney at the Gabba. Daicos was on the boundary line under pressure, handballs it in front of himself and the Sydney defender, then picking it up again and kicking a right foot banana 30 metres out on the boundary. A kick reminiscent of one his father Peter would frequently kick.	
2021	Caleb Serong	Fremantle	Round 22 goal against West Coast Eagles at Optus Stadium. Ball was kept in by Adam Cerra, who gave to Mitch Crowden, who broke a tackle before handpassing to Serong, who was knocked to the ground by Dom Sheed before getting up again and kicking the checkside goal from deep in the right forward pocket. Anthony Hudson's call of "Serong, so right" immortalised the goal.	
2022	Sam Draper	Essendon	Round 18 goal against Gold Coast at Marvel Stadium. Ruckman Draper gathered the ball directly from the centre bounce, sprinted towards the 50m arc, executed a one–two handpass with Matt Guelfi, side-stepped Suns defender Charlie Ballard before successfully slotting a banana kick from 25 metres out on a slight angle.	
2023	Will Ashcroft	Brisbane Lions	Round 7 goal against Fremantle at the Gabba. From the pocket and under pressure, Ashcroft collected the ball in mid-air and brought it down onto his boot in one smooth motion all before landing back on the ground, kicking an incredible goal from the outside of the boot on a tight angle.	
2024	Harley Reid	West Coast	Round 10 goal against Melbourne (Narrm) at Optus Stadium. Reid grabbed the ball one handed from the ruck tap on the defensive side of the centre circle. He sprinted at full pace taking three bounces with Christian Petracca chasing him, kicking the goal from just inside 50 on the run.	
2025	Noah Anderson	Gold Coast	Round 18 goal against Collingwood at People's First Stadium. Anderson took the ball from a centre bounce before handballing off to Lachie Weller, then received a return handball pass from Weller to sprint with the ball and kick straight from about 40 metres from goal at a crucial point late in the match.	
2026	Conor McKenna	Brisbane Lions	Round 24 goal against Collingwood at the MCG. Irishman McKenna intercepted a handball from Magpie Sam Swadling before soccering the ball through the goal from a very tight angle in the pocket, "showcasing his Gaelic background".	

== AFL Women's ==
Player is still active in AFL Women's
Player also won Mark of the Year for the same year

Season	Winner	Team	Description	Video
2017	Erin Phillips	Adelaide	Round 3 goal against Carlton at Thebarton Oval. Phillips takes a mark and bombs a long goal from outside the 50-metre arc.	
2018	Aliesha Newman	Melbourne	Round 2 goal against Adelaide at Casey Fields. Newman collects the ball on the wing, takes three bounces into the forward pocket and kicks a 20-metre banana.	
2019	Ashley Sharp	Fremantle	Round 2 goal against Brisbane at Fremantle Oval. Sharp collects the ball in the centre of the ground, takes two bounces and completes the shot from 40 metres out from goal.	
2020	Kate Hore	Melbourne	Round 6 goal against Carlton at Traeger Park. Hore collects the ball in the middle of the ground, takes three bounces to reach inside 50, passes it off to a teammate, receives it back and then snaps on a sharp angle from 10 metres out.	
2021	Courtney Hodder	Brisbane	Round 9 goal against Melbourne at Casey Fields. Hodder was at the edge of the 50-metre arc, where she kicks it up to herself, and kicks a right foot drop punt from tight on the boundary.	
2022 (S6)	Ebony Antonio	Fremantle	Round 1 goal against West Coast at Fremantle Oval. Antonio gathers 50 metres out on the boundary, evades an opponent, and kicks a goal from 30m out on the boundary off the outside of her boot.	
2022 (S7)	Ashanti Bush	Gold Coast	Round 10 goal against Greater Western Sydney at Henson Park. At full pace, Bush tapped the ball on from wide out inside the 50-metre arc, then gathered and kicked a right foot snap with the outside of her boot, from just inside the boundary line approximately 30m from goal.	
2023	Caitlin Greiser	Richmond	Round 10 goal against Collingwood at Victoria Park. Greiser gathered the ball just in front of the left behind post and kicked a right foot snap with the outside of her boot, slotting the goal just before crossing the boundary line.	
2024	Hannah Munyard	Adelaide	Week 6 goal against St Kilda at Norwood Oval. Munyard received a handball on the boundary near the forward flank before outpacing several defenders to slot a check-side goal from the pocket.	
2025	Montana Ham	Sydney	Round 5 goal against Collingwood at Victoria Park. Ham marked a Collingwood kick in the midfield and ran to kick the goal from inside 50, completing two one–two handballs during her run.	
