= 1974 VFL grand final =

Grand final of the 1974 Victorian Football League season

1974 VFL Grand Final

Richmond	North Melbourne
18.20 (128)	13.9 (87)
	1	2	3	4
RICH	3.8 (26)	10.11 (71)	12.17 (89)	18.20 (128)
NM	3.2 (20)	8.3 (51)	11.4 (70)	13.9 (87)
- Date: 28 September 1974
- Stadium: Melbourne Cricket Ground, Melbourne, Australia
- Attendance: 113,839
- Favourite: Richmond

The 1974 VFL grand final was an Australian rules football game contested between the Richmond Football Club and North Melbourne Football Club, held at the Melbourne Cricket Ground in Melbourne on 28 September 1974. It was the 77th annual grand final of the Victorian Football League, staged to determine the premiers for the 1974 VFL season. The match, attended 113,839 spectators, was won by Richmond by a margin of 41 points, marking that club's ninth VFL/AFL premiership victory. It was the first grand final to be videotaped and telecast in colour (test colour broadcasts however did not commence until mid-October of that same year).

== Background ==
Richmond, the reigning premier, was making its third consecutive appearance in a grand final.

Conversely, this was only North Melbourne's second appearance in a grand final in its history, its sole previous appearance having been in the 1950 VFL grand final, and it was the only club yet to win a flag. North Melbourne was coached by three-time premiership coach Ron Barassi in his second year as coach of the club. He had managed to reverse the club's fortunes after it had finished last with one win in the 1972 season, and 1974 was North Melbourne's first time in the top four since 1958. The addition through the 10-year rule of experienced players from other clubs such as Doug Wade (Geelong), Barry Davis (Essendon) and John Rantall (South Melbourne) added great strength to the North Melbourne side.

At the conclusion of the regular home-and-away season, Richmond had finished first on the ladder with 17 wins and 5 losses. North Melbourne had finished second with 16 wins and 6 losses.

In the finals series leading up to the grand final, North Melbourne defeated Hawthorn by 38 points in the qualifying final before losing to Richmond by 21 points in the second semi-final. They then met Hawthorn again in the preliminary final, which they won by just five points to advance to the grand final. Richmond advanced straight to the grand final on the back of their win in the second semi-final.

Earlier in the month, North Melbourne wingman Keith Greig won his second consecutive Brownlow Medal.

== Match summary ==
Team	1	2	3	Final
Richmond	3.8	10.11	12.17	18.20 (128)
North Melbourne	3.2	8.3	11.4	13.9 (87)

=== First quarter ===
The match was played on a dry surface in overcast conditions. The game developed into a battle of defences in the early part of the opening quarter, before North Melbourne's Sam Kekovich marked strongly and kicked the first goal of the game. North Melbourne had the majority of the crowd support due to the fact it was striving for its first VFL premiership. Wayne Walsh kicked Richmond's first goal after receiving a free kick in the forward pocket. Richmond captain Royce Hart performed strongly at centre half-forward, marking strongly on several occasions. Daryl Cumming handpassed to tall youngster David Cloke and he registered Richmond's second goal with an excellent left-foot snap under extreme pressure from several North Melbourne defenders. Both sides were applying intense physical pressure, and this resulted in several basic errors in general play. Misses to Hart, Kevin Bartlett and Paul Sproule saw Richmond move to 2 goals 7 behinds (19 points), before Barry Richardson goaled after a strong mark to give the Tigers a comfortable lead near quarter-time. North Melbourne fought back with a fine snap from full-forward Doug Wade, which was up his 100th goal for the season. Veteran rover Barry Cable kicked a goal right on the siren after receiving a free kick, to bring North Melbourne to within six points. Richmond 3.8 (26) led North Melbourne 3.2 (20).

=== Second quarter ===
After their late rush in the first quarter, North Melbourne started strongly in the second quarter. Early goals to captain Barry Davis and two to Wade saw North Melbourne open up a 12-point lead. Then, a major turning point in the game occurred when Kevin Sheedy took a clever one-handed mark in the forward pocket for Richmond; he went back to take his shot for goal from a very acute angle, ran in as if to kick, but then handballed over the man on the mark to the unguarded Michael Green, who dribbled through the easiest of goals. North Melbourne seemed to falter after this as Richmond lifted dramatically, with two goals following quickly: Sheedy passed to an unchecked Hart, who marked and goaled from the forward pocket; and Green took a strong mark and converted from the goal square. Then North Melbourne's Keith Greig won the ball on the Members' wing, dodged two Richmond opponents, took a bounce and passed to Wayne Schimmelbusch, who passed to Cable; but Cable, who was on his own, fumbled the mark and the ball rolled through for a behind. Richmond then went forward, where Neil Balme was given a free kick for a trip and kicked a long goal with a torpedo punt from the outer half-forward flank. Hart continued to dominate, kicking two goals – one from a spectacular mark and the other from a snap after gathering a loose ball from a ball-up. Robert Peterson kicked a good snap-shot goal for North Melbourne, to reduce Richmond's lead to 20 points at half time: Richmond 10.11 (71) leading North Melbourne 8.3 (51).

=== Third quarter ===
North Melbourne appeared after half-time without captain Davis, who had an injured leg, replaced by 19th man Arnold Briedis. After just two minutes of play, Sheedy goaled for Richmond after taking a mark. Richmond's David Thorpe's shot for goal narrowly missed, before Wade kicked a goal for North Melbourne. Richmond quickly replied when Thorpe converted from a free kick. Briedis goaled with a fine kick on the run. Kevin Morris was felled on the outer wing and shortly afterwards a fight broke out involving a large group of players: Wade charged from full-forward at Richmond defender Robert McGhie, but McGhie ducked and Wade fell to the turf; Bryan Wood and Paul Feltham tangled, along with Morris and Kekovich. Richmond added behinds to Sheedy, from a free kick, Sproule, from a mark, and Cumming, from a snap. With McGhie limping noticeably, Kekovich kicked his second goal. North Melbourne attacked hard, but Richmond's defence prevented further goals. Morris missed after a kick on the run. From the kick-in, however, Sheedy took a high mark and goaled from the outer pocket. Following a high-standard third quarter, North Melbourne had reduced Richmond's half-time lead by only one point, Richmond 12.17 (89) leading North Melbourne 11.4 (70).

=== Fourth quarter ===
From the first bounce, Hart drove Richmond forward, where Cumming gathered a loose ball and handballed to Richardson, who kicked a goal from alone, the goal came after only 51 seconds of play. Soon after, strong play by Thorpe led to the ball being forced towards Cumming, who tapped it to Sheedy for another goal. A third goal came when Hart gathered a loose ball on the centre wing and passed to Sheedy, who drove deep into the forward pocket with a drop kick; Richardson crumbed, eluded an opponent, before snapping a right-foot goal. Hart was flattened in an incident with North Melbourne's Phil Baker, who was reported as a result. Cumming goaled from a free kick, and Richardson kicked the next goal after taking a mark diving sideways. At this point, Richmond had kicked the first five goals of the quarter and extended the lead to an unassailable 50 points. Greig kicked a good running goal. Richardson, using his body well to keep his opponent out, took another strong mark, and goaled. Two late substitutions saw Cameron Clayton came on to the field to replace Wood, and Sheedy replaced by Brian Roberts. Burns kicked North Melbourne's 13th goal. When the final siren scored, Richmond had won by 41 points, Richmond 18.20 (128) defeated North Melbourne 13.9 (87).

== Aftermath ==
This was Richmond's fourth VFL premiership in eight years, all of them under the coaching of Tom Hafey, and it was the second time that Richmond had won back-to-back VFL premiership. It also proved to be a change in the league's dominant team: it was the end of Richmond's period of sustained success, not reaching another grand final until 1980; but it was the start of one of the strongest periods in North Melbourne's history, which saw it reach five consecutive grand finals between 1974 and 1978, winning two of them.

== Teams ==
Richmond	North Melbourne

Richmond
B:	40 Mervyn Keane	8 Dick Clay	5 Gareth Andrews
HB:	30 Francis Bourke (dvc)	12 Robert McGhie	38 Kevin Morris
C:	7 Wayne Walsh	14 David Thorpe	16 Bryan Wood
HF:	33 David Cloke	4 Royce Hart (c)	6 Paul Sproule
F:	21 Neil Balme	17 Barry Richardson	1 Daryl Cumming
Foll:	37 Michael Green	10 Kevin Sheedy	29 Kevin Bartlett (vc)
Res:	15 Brian Roberts	43 Cameron Clayton	
Coach:	Tom Hafey		

North Melbourne
B:	17 Denis Pagan	23 David Dench (vc)	1 Brad Smith
HB:	5 John Rantall	28 Gary Farrant	12 Ken Montgomery
C:	27 Keith Greig	11 John Burns	20 Wayne Schimmelbusch
HF:	4 Sam Kekovich	29 Phil Baker	18 Paul Feltham
F:	19 Phil Ryan	2 Doug Wade	8 Robert Peterson
Foll:	10 Barry Goodingham (dvc)	32 Barry Davis (c)	9 Barry Cable
Res:	13 Gary Cowton	6 Arnold Briedis	
Coach:	Ron Barassi		

== Goalkickers ==
Richmond:

- Richardson 5
- Hart 3
- Green 2
- Sheedy 2
- Balme 2
- Walsh 1
- Cloke 1
- Thorpe 1
- Cumming 1

North Melbourne:

- Wade 4
- Kekovich 2
- Cable 2
- Davis 1
- Peterson 1
- Breidis 1
- Greig 1
- Burns 1

== See also ==
- 1974 VFL season
