= Chris Perry (Australian footballer) =

Australian rules footballer and coach

Personal information
- Full name: Chris Perry
- Born: 24 October 1953 (age 73)
- Original team: Stawell
- Height: 191 cm (6 ft 3 in)
- Weight: 84 kg (185 lb)

Playing career^{1}
Years	Club	Games (Goals)
1976–1980	Collingwood	27 (2)
- ^{1} Playing statistics correct to the end of 1980.

Chris Perry (born 24 October 1953) is a former Australian rules footballer who played with Collingwood in the Victorian Football League (VFL).

Perry was a defender, often used as a reserve off the bench. He missed selection for the 1977 VFL Grand Final but was recalled for the Grand Final Replay to replace Doug Gott in the back pocket. Gott was omitted because of a knee injury, which was the same reason that Perry had lost his place in the side in round 18.

He left Collingwood to return to his original club, Stawell, in 1979. After a season he was lured back by Tom Hafey but more knee problems meant his comeback lasted just one year.

A "best and fairest" winner at Wodonga in 1983, Perry later coached Horsham United.
