= Rowan Sawers =

Australian rules field umpire (born 1954)

Rowan Sawers OAM

Personal information
- Born: 19 October 1954 (age 72)
- Debut: Round 7, 1977

Umpiring career
Years	League	Role	Games
1977–1997	Australian Football League (AFL)	field	406

Career highlights
- 4× AFL Grand Final umpire: (1982, 1984, 1987, 1990); Bishop Shield: (1984); Australian Football Hall of Fame, inducted 2004; AFL Umpires Association Team of the Century 2002; AFL Umpires Association Hall of Fame, inducted 2008

Rowan Sawers OAM (born 19 October 1954) is a former Australian rules football field umpire and umpire coach in the Australian Football League (AFL).

== Career ==
Over a career that spanned 21 seasons, Sawers became the first field umpire to reach the 400-game milestone at senior VFL/AFL level, eventually retiring after 406 games, which included four VFL/AFL Grand finals and 31 other finals.

In addition, he umpired eight State of Origin games, two International rules football tours to Ireland, and 16 VFA games, including at least one VFA Grand Final.

Sawers was recruited from the Southern Umpires' Association in Seaford, Victoria. He began umpiring in the Victorian Football Association in 1975, and began his Victorian Football League career in 1977.

He was selected to officiate his first senior VFL match in Round 7 of the 1977 VFL season with Ian Robinson between St Kilda and South Melbourne at Moorabbin Oval. In a memorable umpiring debut, the Saints staged a mighty comeback in the final quarter to snatch a draw, but Sawers' main recollection was of his first bounce "My first bounce in League football didn't bounce – the ball got stuck in the mud. Paul Callery, the St Kilda rover, plucked the Sherrin out of the bog and played on."

Sawers eventually broke the VFL/AFL games record of former colleague Ian Robinson during the 1995 AFL season, and in Round 16 of that season also broke Ivo Crapp's long-standing elite Australian rules football games record, officiating his 354th VFL/AFL match at The Gabba, between the Brisbane Bears and Hawthorn.

His games record stood until 2007, when it was broken by Hayden Kennedy.

He is currently a member of the AFL's Laws of the Game Committee and head coach of umpiring in the Essendon District Football League Umpires Association. He was the head umpire coach for AFL umpires for many years.

After stepping down from the role of AFL umpires coach at the end of 2013, Sawers was approached by the Essendon District Football League (EDFL) to manage and develop its umpiring department. He accepted the position in April 2014 and served until deciding to retire in October 2020 to spend more time with his family.

== Honours ==
In 2002, Sawers was named in the AFL Umpires Association Umpires' Team of the Century, and in 2004 he became the 11th umpire inducted into the Australian Football Hall of Fame.
