= Terry Smith (Australian footballer) =

Australian rules footballer

Personal information
- Born: 6 February 1959
- Died: 19 September 2006 (aged 47)
- Original team: Tyntynder
- Height: 185 cm (6 ft 1 in)
- Weight: 84 kg (185 lb)

Playing career^{1}
Years	Club	Games (Goals)
1980–1982	Richmond	50 (14)
1983–1985	St Kilda	44 (25)
1986	Richmond	6 (1)
Total		100 (40)
- ^{1} Playing statistics correct to the end of 1986.

Career highlights
- Richmond Premiership Player 1980; Richmond Under 19s Premiership Player 1977; Interstate games:- 1

Terry Smith (6 February 1959 – 19 September 2006) was an Australian rules footballer in the Victorian Football League.

Smith was recruited from Tyntynder (a small town near Swan Hill) and debuted with the Richmond Football Club in 1980. He tasted success immediately, being part of Richmond's 1980 premiership side playing off half-back.

In 1983 he moved to the St Kilda Football Club where he made a name for himself as a ruck-rover, and after three seasons with the Saints, he returned to Richmond for his final VFL season in 1986. He played 100 VFL games in total, 56 with the Tigers and 44 with the Saints.

Smith died on 19 September 2006 from cancer, aged 47. He was described by Tigers teammate Michael Roach as "one of those blokes people liked to be around and liked to have a beer with".

== Sources ==
- Hogan P., The Tigers of Old, Richmond F.C., Melbourne, 1996
