= Phil Baker (footballer) =

Australian rules footballer

Personal information
- Nickname: Snake
- Born: 22 March 1952 (age 74)
- Original teams: Rutherglen, Albury (O&M)
- Height: 195 cm (6 ft 5 in)
- Weight: 93 kg (205 lb)
- Position: Full Forward/Centre Half Forward

Playing career^{1}
Years	Club	Games (Goals)
1971–1975	North Melbourne	58 (52)
1975	Geelong	9 (9)
1977–1979	North Melbourne	39 (64)
Total		106 (125)
- ^{1} Playing statistics correct to the end of 1979.

Career highlights
- VFL premiership player: 1977

Phil Baker (born 22 March 1952) is a former Australian rules footballer who played for North Melbourne and Geelong in the Victorian Football League (VFL) during the 1970s as a high marking forward and started his career at North Melbourne in 1971.

In 1969, Baker kicked 62 goals for Albury after originally playing with Rutherglen in the Ovens & Murray Football League and played several matches for North Melbourne Reserves in 1970 prior to moving to Melbourne in 1971.

Baker was a member of North Melbourne's losing 1974 VFL Grand Final side and was reported for striking Richmond's Royce Hart.

Five games into the 1975 season he was transferred to Geelong by Allen Aylett due to financial reasons. His loyalty to North was never questioned after his time away and in 1977 he proved to be an integral part of the North Melbourne forward line. This was evident as he played a major role in a premiership year with 35 goals.

In June 1976, Baker trained with VFA club, Brunswick and Geelong offered to clear Baker back to North Melbourne, but North Melbourne declined the offer.

He kicked six of the club's nine goals in the 1977 Grand Final against Collingwood and three in the following weekend's Grand Final Replay, in which he was reported. His accuracy at goal as opposed to Arnold Briedis's inaccuracy, kept North Melbourne in the game against Collingwood.

In 1978 he played in North Melbourne's losing grand final against Hawthorn and kicked another bag of six goals. The highlight of the 1978 VFL Grand Final was his high leaping marks and desperate efforts to get North Melbourne back in the game. However, his efforts alone were not enough to win the grand final for North Melbourne. In these three grand finals he kicked a total of 15 goals.

Baker injured his right knee at training in May 1980 which ended his VFL football career.

Phil Baker's nickname was "Snake" and wore jumper number 29. His teammates usually entered the field with the immortal words ringing in their ears, No messing around, long bombs to Snake".
