= Jaxson Barham =

Australian rules footballer (born 1988)

Personal information
- Born: 20 May 1988 (age 38); Victoria
- Original team: Geelong Falcons Lorne F.C
- Debut: Round 4, 17 April 2009, Collingwood vs. Brisbane Lions, at The Gabba
- Height: 182 cm (6 ft 0 in)
- Weight: 74 kg (163 lb)

Playing career^{1}
Years	Club	Games (Goals)
2009–2010	Collingwood	7 (1)
- ^{1} Playing statistics correct to the end of 2010.

Career highlights
- 2009 AFL Rising Star nominee

Jaxson Barham (born 20 May 1988) is a former Australian rules footballer. He played seven senior games for the Collingwood Football Club from 2009–2010 before being delisted at the end of the 2010 season.

== Background ==
Drafted under the Australian Football League's father-son rule (son of Ricky Barham) with the 61st selection in the 2007 National Draft, Barham is a medium midfielder. He grew up in Barwon Heads and at 6 years of age moved to the suburb of Kew in Melbourne, Victoria. Barham attended Ivanhoe Grammar School, representing the school in football on more than one occasion before moving back to Barwon Heads to complete his Year 11 and 12 VCE studies at Geelong College. He played for Lorne Football Club, where he really started to turn heads for his playing style, which was considered as talented as his father, former Collingwood player, Ricky Barham. After just a few games for Lorne Football Club he was invited to join the Geelong Falcons a team competing in the TAC Cup, and a stepping stone for up and coming AFL players. Jaxson was one of the two over 18 year old players allowed to play for the Geelong Falcons in the TAC Cup under 18 division.

== Career ==
Barham had an unfortunate start to his AFL career, cracking a shoulder socket in a practice match in the 2008 pre-season, as well as having his tonsils removed.

He made his AFL debut on 17 April 2009 against the Brisbane Lions at the Gabba. Barham had 28 disposals and a game-high nine tackles, playing on Lions midfield star Luke Power. For this impressive debut, Barham earned the NAB Rising Star nomination for round 4, 2009. Barham played a further five games in 2009, including the annual Anzac Day clash against Essendon.

Barham managed only one senior game in 2010, a draw in the annual Queen's Birthday Clash against Melbourne. He was delisted by Collingwood at the end of the 2010 season.

In 2011, Barham was signed to play for the Geelong Football Club in the Victorian Football League (VFL).
