= Phil Ryan (footballer, born 1951) =

Australian rules footballer

Personal information
- Full name: Phil Ryan
- Born: 14 May 1951 (age 75)
- Original team: Yarrawonga
- Height: 191 cm (6 ft 3 in)
- Weight: 83 kg (183 lb)
- Position: Utility

Playing career^{1}
Years	Club	Games (Goals)
1970–76	North Melbourne	106 (56)
- ^{1} Playing statistics correct to the end of 1976.

Phil Ryan (born 14 May 1951) is a retired Australian rules footballer who played with North Melbourne in the Victorian Football League (VFL) during the 1970s.

A utility, Ryan was recruited from Yarrawonga but also played some of his early football at Assumption College. He played from the forward pocket in North Melbourne's 1974 VFL Grand Final loss to Richmond. Ryan brought up his 100th league game with a win over South Melbourne in the final round of the 1975 season and retired a year later.
