= Wayne Gordon (footballer) =

Australian rules footballer

Personal information
- Full name: Wayne Gordon
- Born: 11 July 1954
- Died: 29 September 1983 (aged 29)
- Original team: Preston
- Height: 189 cm (6 ft 2 in)
- Weight: 83 kg (183 lb)

Playing career^{1}
Years	Club	Games (Goals)
1974–1978	Collingwood	67 (23)
1979–1981	Melbourne	34 (5)
Total		101 (28)
- ^{1} Playing statistics correct to the end of 1981.

Wayne Gordon (11 July 1954 – 29 September 1983) was an Australian rules footballer who played with Collingwood and Melbourne in the Victorian Football League (VFL).

== History ==
Gordon came to Collingwood in 1974 and by 1976 was a regular fixtures on the wing. A former Preston player, he missed the opening round of the 1977 season but then played every remaining game that year, including both the drawn and replayed Grand Finals. In the 1977 VFL Grand Final replay, Gordon contributed two goals, although they went down to North Melbourne.

He was tried at times at full-back for Melbourne and played 20 games in 1980, but his appearances in 1981 were restricted due to a spleen injury.

Gordon, who had lost his father to blood cancer at the age of 42, developed cancer himself during his time at Melbourne. He died of Hodgkin's disease on 29 September 1983, aged 29.
