= Paul Feltham =

Australian rules footballer and coach (1948–2019)

- Feltham in 1973

Personal information
- Full name: Paul Feltham
- Born: 1 October 1948
- Died: 19 December 2019 (aged 71)
- Height: 175 cm (5 ft 9 in)
- Weight: 78 kg (172 lb)
- Position: Midfielder

Playing career^{1}
Years	Club	Games (Goals)
1970–1976	North Melbourne	128 (78)
1978	Richmond	7 (8)
1977	East Fremantle	19 (14)
Total		154 (100)

Coaching career^{3}
Years	Club	Games (W–L–D)
1989	Brisbane Bears	7 (5–2–0)
- ^{1} Playing statistics correct to the end of 1978.^{3} Coaching statistics correct as of 1989.

Career highlights
- North Melbourne premiership player 1975

Paul Feltham (1 October 1948 – 19 December 2019) was an Australian rules footballer and coach. He played 154 games for North Melbourne and Richmond in the Victorian Football League between 1970 and 1978, and later served as the caretaker senior coach of the Brisbane Bears in 1989.

== Playing career ==
Early in his career, Feltham played for Box Hill in the Victorian Football Association (VFA) in 1967, Eastlake Football Club in the ACTAFL and the Balmain Football Club in the NSWAFL. His talent was his tough, courageous determination and his quick handball.

Feltham played as a winger and midfielder at North Melbourne from 1970 to 1976. He played in the 1974 VFL grand final and was one of the best players in the club's first VFL premiership in 1975. He later joined Richmond for the 1978 season, where he kicked 14 goals in his 19 games.

== Coaching career ==
=== Early career ===
Feltham captain-coached Mordialloc during the 1979 VFA season, then left to coach West Canberra in 1980.

Later in the 1980s he moved to Queensland, where he coached the University of Southern Queensland's Australian football team to back to back premierships in the Darling Downs AFL competition in 1986 and 1987 and the Morningside Football Club in the Queensland Australian Football League (QAFL).

=== Brisbane Bears ===
Feltham joined the underperforming Brisbane Bears in a part-time role as sports psychologist for the 1989 season.

When incumbent senior coach Peter Knights was sacked with seven games remaining in the 1989 season, Feltham was surprisingly appointed caretaker senior coach ahead of any of the existing coaching panel. The Bears immediately rallied to win five of the remaining matches, which included an upset win over the eventual premiers Hawthorn, who only lost three matches over the home-and-away season.

Feltham was not considered for the permanent senior coaching position for the following season, reportedly due to a clash with particular senior players and certain club personnel, most notably football manager Shane O'Sullivan. He was replaced by another caretaker senior coach, former coaching assistant and ex-Fitzroy player Norm Dare, for the 1990 season while the search for a permanent senior coach continued for 1991.

=== Other coaching roles ===
For most of the 1990s, he disappeared from the spotlight, but reappeared in 1999 as an applicant for the vacant coaching role with Woodville-West Torrens. He applied for the same position again the following season. He also applied for the coaching role with Hawthorn in 2004. He was unsuccessful in each of these applications.

Later in life, Feltham was based in Canada and coached the London Magpies Australian Football Club while working as a sports psychologist with AFL Canada.

== Personal life ==
Feltham died on 19 December 2019. His death was not reported until June 2025, when it was confirmed by North Melbourne historians and posted online by Richmond historian Rhett Bartlett.

During his time in Queensland, he was in a relationship with 21 year old Diane McGrane, who was murdered by her brother in 1986.
