= Rene Kink =

Australian rules footballer

Personal information
- Full name: Rene Kink
- Nickname: The Incredible Hulk
- Born: 22 November 1956 (age 69)
- Height: 183 cm (6 ft 0 in)
- Weight: 91 kg (201 lb)

Playing career^{1}
Years	Club	Games (Goals)
1973–1983	Collingwood	154 (240)
1983–1985	Essendon	20 (35)
1986	St Kilda	7 (5)
1988	Camberwell	6 (15)
Total		187 (295)
- ^{1} Playing statistics correct to the end of 1986.

Rene Kink (born 22 November 1956) is a former Australian rules footballer who played with the Collingwood Football Club, Essendon Football Club and St Kilda Football Club in the Victorian Football League (VFL).

Kink played in a variety of positions during his career but was mainly used as a half forward flanker or full forward. He played in the 1973 preliminary final at the age of 16, becoming the youngest person to play in an AFL/VFL final, and went on to appear in 21 more finals matches in his career although he never got a premiership. Kink played in five losing grand finals however, in 1977, 1979, 1980, 1981 and 1983. The last of those was with Essendon who he had transferred to during the season. Essendon won the flag the following year but Kink missed out, a serious knee injury preventing him from playing a game in 1984.

Kink finished his VFL career playing one year at St Kilda before retiring at the end of 1986. In his fourteen-year career 1979 was his most successful season, kicking 54 goals and finishing equal seventh in the Brownlow Medal count.

In 1988, Kink captained the Camberwell Football Club in the Victorian Football Association (VFA) second division.

Kink's brother Adrian played reserves football at Collingwood but never played a senior game.

== Media ==
In 1980, Kink and other Collingwood players including Peter Daicos had a minor role in the movie The Club which centred on the Magpies. The movie, directed by Bruce Beresford and based on the play by David Williamson, starred Jack Thompson as Magpies coach Laurie Holden, Graham Kennedy as club president Ted Parker, and John Howard as new recruit Geoff Hayward. Kink played the role of Magpies hard man "Tank O'Donohue".
