= John Cassin (footballer) =

Australian rules footballer

Personal information
- Born: 2 July 1951 (age 75)
- Original team: Colac (HFL)
- Height: 180 cm (5 ft 11 in)
- Weight: 73 kg (161 lb)

Playing career^{1}
Years	Club	Games (Goals)
1971–1974	Essendon (VFL)	51 (32)
1975-1976	West Torrens (SANFL)	34 (35)
1977–1981	North Melbourne (VFL)	78 (83)
1981–1982	Fitzroy (VFL)	5 (0)
Total		168 (150)
- ^{1} Playing statistics correct to the end of 1982.

Career highlights
- 1977 premiership player with North Melbourne

John Cassin (born 2 July 1951) is a former Australian rules footballer who played for Essendon, North Melbourne and Fitzroy in the VFL, and West Torrens in the SANFL.

He made his league debut in 1971 for Essendon after being recruited by the club under the father-son rule, as his father Jack was a dual premiership player with Essendon.

Cassin was mainly a wingman during his career but was also used on the ball and up forward. In 1975, he left the VFL to join West Torrens in South Australia, where he captained the team for the 1976 season. In 1977 he joined North Melbourne and was one of the club's leading goalkickers in their premiership year with 36 goals. He managed to play every game that year, including the 1977 VFL Grand Final which went to a replay; in doing so, he was the first player to play twenty seven matches in a VFL/AFL season, a record he held uniquely until 2024, after the extension of the home-and-away season to 23 matches. During the 1981 season, he crossed to Fitzroy but appeared only five times for the club before leaving the following year.
