= Cameron Clayton =

Australian rules footballer (born 1957)

Personal information
- Born: 5 February 1957 (age 69)
- Original team: New Norfolk (TANFL)
- Debut: Round 15, 1974, Richmond vs. Carlton, at the MCG
- Height: 180 cm (5 ft 11 in)
- Weight: 85 kg (187 lb)

Playing career^{1}
| Years | Club | Games (Goals) |
| 1974–1977 | Richmond | 57 (20) |
| 1979–1982 | Melbourne | 44 (18) |
| 1983 | Essendon | 17 (1) |
| Total | | 118 (39) |
- ^{1} Playing statistics correct to the end of 1983.

Career highlights
- VFL premiership player: 1974

Cameron Clayton (born 5 February 1957) is a former Australian rules footballer who played with Richmond, Melbourne and Essendon in the Victorian Football League (VFL).

Clayton came to the VFL from Tasmanian club New Norfolk and would go on to spend nine seasons in the league. Strongly built, Clayton was used mostly as a rover and came off the bench for Richmond in the 1974 Grand Final to finish his debut season a premiership player.

He joined Melbourne in 1979 and celebrated his 100th VFL game at Princes Park in the final game of the 1981 season. After managing just one game the following year he crossed to Essendon where he played in another Grand Final, this time finishing on the losing team. In a game against Carlton in 1983 he famously stole Bruce Doull's headband, which Tony Buhagiar threw into the crowd.
