= Bill Nettlefold =

Australian rules footballer

Personal information
- Full name: William Sydney Nettlefold
- Born: 24 April 1953 (age 73); Hobart, Tasmania
- Original team: St Kevins Old Boys
- Height: 178 cm (5 ft 10 in)
- Weight: 89 kg (196 lb)

Playing career^{1}
Years	Club	Games (Goals)
1974–1975	Richmond	15 (6)
1976–1979	North Melbourne	51 (22)
1980–1982	Melbourne	34 (14)
Total		100 (42)
- ^{1} Playing statistics correct to the end of 1982.

William Sydney Nettlefold (born 24 April 1953) is a former Australian rules footballer who played with Richmond, North Melbourne and Melbourne in the Victorian Football League (VFL).

Nettlefold spent time in most positions during his career but was used mainly as a ruck-rover. He started at Richmond before moving on to North Melbourne where he came off the bench in their victorious 1977 Grand Final. In 1980 he crossed to Melbourne and remained there for three seasons to bring his final VFL tally to exactly 100 games.
