= Gerald Betts =

Australian rules footballer

Personal information
- Full name: Gerald Francis Betts
- Born: 5 October 1954 (age 72)
- Original team: Swan Hill
- Height: 187 cm (6 ft 2 in)
- Weight: 85 kg (187 lb)

Playing career^{1}
Years	Club	Games (Goals)
1974–1975	Richmond	10 (0)
1977–1979	Collingwood	27 (5)
Total		37 (5)
- ^{1} Playing statistics correct to the end of 1979.

Gerald Betts (born 5 October 1954) is a former Australian rules footballer who played with Richmond and Collingwood in the Victorian Football League (VFL) during the 1970s.

A defender from Swan Hill, Betts put together just 10 games in two seasons at Richmond. After a year in the WAFL playing for East Perth, he was signed up by Collingwood for the 1977 season. He played in both the 1977 VFL Grand Final and subsequent Grand Final Replay, as a reserve.

Betts, who now works as a real estate director, returned to Western Australia in 1980 to join Claremont. He was a member of their 1981 premiership team and retired after four seasons.
