= John Byrne (Australian footballer) =

Australian rules footballer

Personal information
- Born: 24 February 1956 (age 70)
- Original team: Wangaratta Rovers (OMFL)
- Height: 183 cm (6 ft 0 in)
- Weight: 82 kg (181 lb)

Playing career^{1}
Years	Club	Games (Goals)
1975–1982	North Melbourne	98 (71)
- ^{1} Playing statistics correct to the end of 1982.

John Byrne (born 24 February 1956) is a former Australian rules footballer who played with North Melbourne in the VFL.

Byrne first came under notice when he starred in Wangaratta Rovers 1972 Ovens & Murray Football League premiership as a 16 year old and headed to North Melbourne in 1974, then made his senior VFL debut in 1975. He also won North Melbourne's 1975 reserves best and fairest.

Byrne played mostly as a ruck-rover and in defence for North Melbourne. He started his career with them in 1975 and went on to star in their 1977 premiership as well as playing in their 1976 and 1978 losing grand finals.

Byrne represented Victoria in 1977 against Western Australia at Subiaco.

His VFL career ended prematurely, when he first broke his leg in round 8 against Fitzroy, in May 1979 at the age of 23. Byrne later broken the same leg in 1980 and eventually retired at 26 years of age, in 1982. Byrne returned home to the family farm and was also North Melbourne's Development & Recruiting officer for the Ovens & Murray region.

Byrne later coached the Ovens & Murray Football League to 1985 and 1987 VCFL Country Championship wins. Byrne also coached the VCFL side in 1989.
