= Gerald Tanner =

Australian rules footballer (1921–2022)

Personal information
- Full name: Gerald Thomas Tanner
- Born: 24 August 1921; Creswick, Victoria
- Died: 10 January 2022 (aged 100); Wodonga, Victoria
- Original teams: Wodonga, Cobram
- Height: 175 cm (5 ft 9 in)
- Weight: 73 kg (161 lb)

Playing career^{1}
Years	Club	Games (Goals)
1941	Richmond	1 (0)
- ^{1} Playing statistics correct to the end of 1941.

Gerald Thomas Tanner (24 August 1921 – 10 January 2022) was an Australian rules footballer who played with Richmond in the Victorian Football League (VFL).

== Family ==
The son of Aloysius Lindsay Walter Tanner (1890–1990), and Monica Amy Tanner (1895–1963), née Knight, Gerald Thomas Tanner was born at Creswick, Victoria on 24 August 1921.

His greatest sadness was the loss of his brother Xavier Aloysius Tanner in New Guinea in 1943.

His greatest joy was his marriage to Margaret Raie Murphy (1928–2005) on 12 November 1949. He is the father of 6 including former North Melbourne and Melbourne player, Xavier Tanner.

== Football ==
Tanner’s father was a school teacher and Gerald grew up in various places including Welshpool & Omar St South Caulfield He was originally from Melbourne & played with Murray Football League club Cobram in 1939 and 1940 before his recruitment by Richmond.

Tanner returned to Wodonga in 1945 and went onto play 120 games with Wodonga, including their 1949 O&MFL grand final loss to Albury.

== Death ==
He turned 100 on 24 August 2021, and died at Wodonga, Victoria on 10 January 2022.
