= Robert Briedis =

Australian rules footballer

Personal information
- Full name: Robert Briedis
- Born: 1 January 1957 (age 69)
- Original team: Paramount
- Height: 175 cm (5 ft 9 in)
- Weight: 79 kg (174 lb)

Playing career^{1}
Years	Club	Games (Goals)
1976–78	North Melbourne	9 (0)
- ^{1} Playing statistics correct to the end of 1978.

Robert Briedis (born 1 January 1957) is a former Australian rules footballer who played with North Melbourne in the Victorian Football League (VFL). He is the brother of North Melbourne teammate Arnold Briedis.
