= Steven Icke =

Australian rules footballer (born 1956)

Personal information
- Born: 7 March 1956 (age 70)
- Original team: Noble Park (FFL)
- Height: 184 cm (6 ft 0 in)
- Weight: 92 kg (203 lb)

Playing career^{1}
Years	Club	Games (Goals)
1975–1981	North Melbourne	120 (33)
1982–1987	Melbourne	78 (17)
Total		198 (50)
- ^{1} Playing statistics correct to the end of 1987.

Career highlights
- VFL premiership player: 1977; Keith 'Bluey' Truscott Medal: 1982

Steven Icke /ɪk/ (born 7 March 1956) is a former Australian rules footballer who played for North Melbourne and Melbourne in the Victorian Football League (VFL).

Originally from Federal Football League club Noble Park, Icke was a versatile player, usually seen at half forward or half back. He was a premiership player with North Melbourne in 1977 and at the end of the 1981 season moved to the Melbourne Demons. In his debut season he won the Keith 'Bluey' Truscott Medal for Melbourne's best and fairest player. His career was shortened after snapping his Achilles tendon on an exposed sprinkler box at VFL Park in 1983, followed by a knee reconstruction three years later.

Icke served as the General Manager of Football Operations at the Carlton Football Club between March 2007 and September 2011. He was then replaced by Andrew McKay in the position.

== Playing statistics ==
Legend
G	Goals	K	Kicks	D	Disposals	T	Tackles
B	Behinds	H	Handballs	M	Marks

Season	Team	No.	Games	Totals							Averages (per game)						
Season	Team	No.	Games	G	B	K	H	D	M	T	G	B	K	H	D	M	T
1975	North Melbourne	36	8	6	12	49	19	68	15	—N/a	0.8	1.5	6.1	2.4	8.5	1.9	—N/a
1976	North Melbourne	36	20	6	5	212	60	272	71	—N/a	0.3	0.3	10.6	3.0	13.6	3.6	—N/a
1977	North Melbourne	36	26	9	13	356	89	445	97	—N/a	0.3	0.5	13.7	3.4	17.1	3.7	—N/a
1978	North Melbourne	36	16	4	3	198	101	299	64	—N/a	0.3	0.2	12.4	6.3	18.7	4.0	—N/a
1979	North Melbourne	36	20	4	3	208	128	336	68	—N/a	0.2	0.2	10.4	6.4	16.8	3.4	—N/a
1980	North Melbourne	36	22	3	5	231	168	399	76	—N/a	0.1	0.2	10.5	7.6	18.1	3.5	—N/a
1981	North Melbourne	36	8	1	1	58	49	107	20	—N/a	0.1	0.1	7.3	6.1	13.4	2.5	—N/a
1982	Melbourne	11	21	2	4	173	263	436	73	—N/a	0.1	0.2	8.2	12.5	20.8	3.5	—N/a
1983	Melbourne	11	21	12	7	213	189	402	102	—N/a	0.6	0.3	10.1	9.0	19.1	4.9	—N/a
1984	Melbourne	11	19	1	3	155	158	313	76	—N/a	0.1	0.2	8.2	8.3	16.5	4.0	—N/a
1985	Melbourne	11	15	0	3	115	108	223	46	—N/a	0.0	0.2	7.7	7.2	14.9	3.1	—N/a
1986	Melbourne	11	2	2	0	8	7	15	4	1	2.0	0.0	4.0	3.5	7.5	2.0	0.5
Career			198	50	59	1976	1339	3315	712	1	0.2	0.3	10.0	6.8	16.7	3.6	—N/a
