= Phil Manassa =

Australian rules footballer

Personal information
- Born: 29 January 1956 (age 70)
- Original team: Melbourne High School
- Height: 178 cm (5 ft 10 in)
- Weight: 79 kg (174 lb)

Playing career^{1}
| Years | Club | Games (Goals) |
| 1973–1979 | Collingwood | 122 (60) |
- ^{1} Playing statistics correct to the end of 1979.

Phil Manassa (born 29 January 1956) is a former Australian rules footballer who played with the Collingwood Magpies in the VFL.

He is famous for a goal on the run from the half-back flank, which he kicked in the 1977 Grand Final replay. The Phil Manassa Medal is awarded to the winner of the AFL Goal of the Year. After retiring from playing in the VFL, Manassa played for Devonport in Tasmania and Western Suburbs in Sydney.
