= David Young (Australian footballer) =

Australian rules footballer

Personal information
- Full name: David Young
- Born: 4 April 1954 (age 72)
- Original team: South Adelaide (SANFL)
- Height: 179 cm (5 ft 10 in)
- Weight: 81 kg (179 lb)

Playing career^{1}
Years	Club	Games (Goals)
1977–79	South Melbourne	44 (40)
1979–81	Collingwood	18 (12)
Total		62 (52)
- ^{1} Playing statistics correct to the end of 1981.

David Young (born 4 April 1954) is a former Australian rules footballer who played for South Melbourne and Collingwood in the Victorian Football League (VFL).

Young, the 1974 'Best and Fairest' winner at South Adelaide, kicked 23 goals in his first season with South Melbourne in 1977. This included a six-goal haul in just his third league game, against Fitzroy. During the 1979 season, Young crossed to Collingwood and played in a forward pocket in the 1980 VFL Grand Final loss. His time at Collingwood was cut short due to an Achilles tendon injury.
