= Robert Peterson (footballer) =

Australian rules footballer

Personal information
- Full name: Robert Peterson
- Born: 15 May 1952 (age 74)
- Original team: University High School
- Height: 178 cm (5 ft 10 in)
- Weight: 81 kg (179 lb)
- Position: Forward/Rover

Playing career^{1}
Years	Club	Games (Goals)
1968, 1970–74	North Melbourne	79 (109)
- ^{1} Playing statistics correct to the end of 1974.

Robert Peterson (born 15 May 1952) is a former Australian rules footballer who played with North Melbourne in the Victorian Football League (VFL).

Recruited from University High School, Peterson was both a rover and a forward. By making his debut at the age of just 16 and 45 days he became the youngest ever North Melbourne debutant. He kicked 26 goals in 1971, including a bag of seven against Geelong at Arden Street. His last league game was in the 1974 VFL Grand Final loss and he retired to pursue a medical career.

His two brothers Len and Viv Peterson also played for North Melbourne.
