= Shane Bond (footballer, born 1954) =

Australian rules footballer

Personal information
- Full name: Shane K. Bond
- Born: 20 June 1954 (age 72)
- Original team: West Heidelberg YCW
- Height: 173 cm (5 ft 8 in)
- Weight: 72 kg (159 lb)

Playing career^{1}
Years	Club	Games (Goals)
1974, 1976–78	Collingwood	39 (29)
1979–1980	North Melbourne	9 (8)
Total		48 (37)
- ^{1} Playing statistics correct to the end of 1980.

Shane K. Bond (born 20 June 1954) is a former Australian rules footballer who played with Collingwood and North Melbourne in the Victorian Football League (VFL).

From West Heidelberg, Bond took a while to establish himself at Collingwood after playing his first game in 1974. He played some good football in 1976, kicking four goals in a losing cause against St. Kilda. A rover, he participated in the 1977 VFL Grand Final, having come into the team in their previous fixture with the suspension of Phil Carman. The grand final was drawn and Bond was running with the ball on the wing when the siren sounded. He again played as a reserve in the replay but Collingwood were unable to get the win. He got close to another premiership decider in 1978 when he played in a preliminary final.

He was traded to North Melbourne after the 1978 season, in a swap with Craig Davis. Bond was out of action for most of his first season at North Melbourne due to ankle surgery. He played in his club's 1980 Escort Cup premiership but appeared just seven times during the home and away season and announced his retirement.
