= Ronnie Wearmouth =

Australian rules footballer

Personal information
- Full name: Ronald Wearmouth
- Born: 17 July 1950 (age 76)
- Original team: Noorat
- Debut: Round 14 1969, Collingwood vs. Melbourne, at the MCG
- Height: 175 cm (5 ft 9 in)
- Weight: 75 kg (165 lb)

Playing career^{1}
Years	Club	Games (Goals)
1969–1981	Collingwood	186 (127)
- ^{1} Playing statistics correct to the end of 1981.

Career highlights
- 3rd Copeland Trophy 1976; Victorian representative 1978

Ronald Wearmouth (born 17 July 1950) is a former Australian rules footballer. Wearmouth played for the Collingwood Football Club over 13 years, including four Grand Finals (1977 (twice), 1979 & 1980). He represented Victoria against ACT in 1978. As a rover he was pacy, energetic and robust.

Wearmouth later coached Minyip to Wimmera Football League premierships in 1991 and 1992.
