= Daryl Cumming =

Australian rules footballer (1951–2026)

Personal information
- Born: 15 May 1951
- Died: 24 February 2026 (aged 74)
- Original team: South Mildura
- Height: 175 cm (5 ft 9 in)
- Weight: 72 kg (159 lb)

Playing career
Years	Club	Games (Goals)
1971–1976	Richmond	88 (64)
1977	Melbourne	10 (7)
1978	North Melbourne	1 (0)
1979	South Melbourne	10 (4)
Total		109 (75)

Career highlights
- VFL premiership player: 1974

Daryl Anthony Cumming (15 May 1951 – 24 February 2026) was an Australian rules footballer who played with Richmond, Melbourne, North Melbourne and South Melbourne in the VFL during the 1970s.

Cumming was part of a successful Richmond team and competed in finals every year from his debut season in 1971 to 1975. In that period, he played in two Grand Finals, winning one in 1974. A rover mostly, he kicked a career high five goals in a win against the then reigning premiers Hawthorn at Glenferrie Oval in 1972. He finished his career with three single season stints at Melbourne, North Melbourne and South Melbourne.

Cumming died on 24 February 2026, at the age of 74.
