= Peter Keenan =

Australian rules footballer (born 1951)

Personal information
- Full name: Peter Patrick Pius Paul Keenan
- Born: 7 April 1951 (age 75)
- Original team: Assumption College
- Height: 197 cm (6 ft 6 in)
- Weight: 99 kg (218 lb)

Playing career^{1}
Years	Club	Games (Goals)
1970–1975	Melbourne	101 (86)
1976–1978	North Melbourne	51 (18)
1979–1980	Essendon	31 (17)
1981–1982	Melbourne	30 (2)
Total		213 (123)
- ^{1} Playing statistics correct to the end of 1982.

Career highlights
- North Melbourne premiership player 1977

Peter Patrick Pius Paul "Crackers" Keenan (born 7 April 1951) is a former Australian rules footballer who worked as a strapper for Bart Cummings, and played with Melbourne, Essendon and North Melbourne in the Victorian Football League.

Keenan played as a 197 cm ruckman and was a solid marker of the ball as well as having a good drop punt. He was recruited from Assumption College by Melbourne for whom he made his VFL debut in 1970.

After playing 101 games for Melbourne in six seasons he signed for North Melbourne, a club who had just won the premiership. Apart from having the chance to play regular finals football he had also been tempted to the club by the coach, Ron Barassi. He was North Melbourne's first ruckman in their 1977 premiership team.

In 1978 North Melbourne won the minor premiership and Keenan had enjoyed a stellar season playing as first ruck. However, it would come to a sour end; in a semi-final loss against arch-rivals Hawthorn marred by some violent incidents, Keenan was reported in the last quarter for striking Hawks captain Don Scott. Keenan pleaded "guilty under duress", claiming he had lashed out because Scott had kneed him in a part of the lower back which had become arthritic since falling off a horse four years prior. In spite of his emotional plea for clemency, the VFL Tribunal handed Keenan a two-match suspension, which ruled him out of the Grand Final. He is depicted being reported by an umpire in Jamie Cooper's painting the Game That Made Australia, commissioned by the AFL in 2008 to celebrate the 150th anniversary of the sport.

The 1979 and 1980 seasons were spent with Essendon before he returned to his original team, Melbourne, who had also acquired his premiership coach, Ron Barassi. After retiring as a player he became an Australian rules media commentator. For several years, Keenan was a regular every Friday with Red Symons on 774 ABC Melbourne providing footy and racing tips.

Keenan was ruck coach at Collingwood Football Club for 10 seasons under Leigh Matthews' coaching in the 1990s. After that Keenan was ruck coach at Port Melbourne The Borough under the coaching of Gary Ayres.
