= Stan Magro =

Australian rules footballer and coach

Personal information
- Born: 28 July 1954 (age 72)
- Debut: Round 7, 1977, Collingwood vs. Fitzroy, at Junction Oval
- Height: 177 cm (5 ft 10 in)
- Weight: 90 kg (198 lb)

Playing career^{1}
Years	Club	Games (Goals)
1970–1976	South Fremantle	105 (69)
1977–1982	Collingwood	96 (19)
1983–1984	East Perth	20 (5)
Total		221 (93)

Coaching career^{3}
Years	Club	Games (W–L–D)
1987–1990	South Fremantle	89 (48–41–0)
1992–1993	East Perth	45 (21–23–1)
2001–2005	Perth	96 (34–62–0)
- ^{1} Playing statistics correct to the end of 1984.^{3} Coaching statistics correct as of 2005.

Career highlights
- 3rd Copeland Trophy 1978-79; Victorian representative 1979; Western Australian representative 5 times; Simpson Medal 1975 (WA v Victoria)

Stanley Charles Magro (born 28 July 1954) is a former Australian rules footballer who played with the Collingwood Football Club in the VFL. He also played for South Fremantle and East Perth in the WAFL.

Remembered as one of the game's finest tacklers, Magro played in three losing Grand Finals over six seasons for the Magpies, including the 1977 draw & 1979 thriller.

After retiring from playing football, he began a career in coaching. Initially he coached South Fremantle for four seasons and then East Perth for two in the WAFL before becoming an assistant coach for Collingwood. He then moved back to Western Australia to become an assistant coach for Fremantle Football Club, who sacked him in 1998 when Damian Drum replaced Gerard Neesham as senior coach. In 2005 Magro sued three directors of the club, Gerard McNeill, David Hatt and Ross Kelly and the club itself for $200,000 in lost earnings and damages. He was awarded $43,000 by the courts, but this was later overturned on appeal, although an undisclosed out of court settlement was paid. Magro returned to WAFL coaching in 2001, leading the Perth Football Club for five seasons.

Between 2010 and 2012, Magro was the coach of Myrtleford Football Club in the Ovens & Murray Football League.
