= Graham Gaunt =

Australian rules footballer

Personal information
- Full name: Graham Gaunt
- Born: 2 August 1953 (age 73)
- Height: 185 cm (6 ft 1 in)
- Weight: 82 kg (181 lb)

Playing career^{1}
Years	Club	Games (Goals)
1972, 1976–77	Richmond	19 (8)
1978–82	Melbourne	69 (32)
Total		88 (40)
- ^{1} Playing statistics correct to the end of 1982.

Graham Gaunt (born 2 August 1953) is a former Australian rules footballer who played with Richmond and Melbourne in the Victorian Football League (VFL).
