= Daryl Freame =

Australian rules footballer

Personal information
- Born: 28 December 1957 (age 68)
- Original team: Essex Heights
- Height: 178 cm (5 ft 10 in)
- Weight: 73 kg (161 lb)

Playing career^{1}
Years	Club	Games (Goals)
1977–1981	Richmond	17 (5)
- ^{1} Playing statistics correct to the end of 1981.

Career highlights
- Richmond - Premiership Player 1980; Richmond - Reserves Premiership Player 1977; Richmond - Under 19s Premiership Player 1975

Daryl Freame (born 28 December 1957) is a former Australian rules football player who played in the VFL between 1977 and 1981 for the Richmond Football Club.
