= Jim Jess =

Australian rules footballer

Personal information
- Nickname: The Ghost
- Born: 25 January 1955 (age 71)
- Original teams: Avoca, St Arnaud, Maryborough
- Height: 189 cm (6 ft 2 in)
- Weight: 85 kg (187 lb)

Playing career^{1}
Years	Club	Games (Goals)
1976–1988	Richmond	223 (175)
- ^{1} Playing statistics correct to the end of 1988.

Career highlights
- Richmond Premiership Player 1980; Interstate Games:- 3; All Australian: 1980; Richmond - Hall of Fame - inducted 2008

Jim Jess (born 25 January 1955) is a retired Australian rules football player who was recruited from St. Arnaud after he won the 1975 North Central Football League best and fairest award, the Feeney Medal with 31 votes.

Jess played in the VFL between 1976 and 1988 for the Richmond Football Club and played in Richmond's 1980 VFL grand final win.

Jess also played in Richmond's losing 1982 VFL Grand Final side.

Jess was commonly referred to as 'The Ghost'.
