= Stan Alves =

Australian rules footballer (born 1946)

Personal information
- Full name: Neil Stanley Alves
- Born: 22 May 1946 (age 80)
- Original team: Edithvale-Aspendale
- Height: 178 cm (5 ft 10 in)
- Weight: 78 kg (172 lb)
- Position: Wing

Playing career^{1}
Years	Club	Games (Goals)
1965–1976	Melbourne	226 (160)
1977–1979	North Melbourne	40 (14)
Total		266 (174)

Representative team honours^{2}
Years	Team	Games (Goals)
1968–1975	Victoria	4 (?)

Coaching career^{3}
Years	Club	Games (W–L–D)
1994–1998	St Kilda	115 (55–59–1)
- ^{1} Playing statistics correct to the end of 1979.^{2} Representative statistics correct as of 1975.^{3} Coaching statistics correct as of 1998.

Career highlights
- VFL premiership: 1977; Melbourne captain: 1973–1976; 2× Keith 'Bluey' Truscott Medal: 1972, 1974; Melbourne Team of the Century–emergency; Melbourne Hall of Fame

Neil Stanley "Stan" Alves, OAM (born 22 May 1946) is a former Australian rules football player and coach.

== Playing career ==
=== Melbourne ===
Alves played 226 games and kicked a total of 160 goals for the Melbourne Football Club from 1965 until 1976. captaining them from 1973–1976 and finishing runner-up for the Brownlow Medal in 1975.

=== North Melbourne ===
Alves joined North Melbourne in 1977. Legend has it that he chose to play for North Melbourne rather than Collingwood based on a coin toss. It proved to be a wise decision as North Melbourne met Collingwood in the 1977 Grand Final and, after initially playing a 76-all draw, won the replay 151–124.

Alves played 40 games for North Melbourne and kicked a total of 14 goals from 1977 until 1979 before retiring from his playing career.

== Coaching career ==
=== St Kilda Football Club senior coach (1994–1998) ===
Alves became senior coach of St Kilda in 1994, when he replaced Ken Sheldon. In the 1994 season, St Kilda under Alves finished 13th on the ladder out of 15 teams in a disappointing season. The following 1995 season, St Kilda once again under Alves had another disappointing season as they finished 14th out of 16 teams. St Kilda won the 1996 pre-season competition. In the 1996 season, St Kilda under Alves had another disappointing season, after a promising pre-season competition to find itself finished 10th after round 22. St Kilda won just 10 games for the season.

Alves however went on to coach St Kilda in the 1997 season to finish as runners up and first grand final in 26 years in 1997, where St Kilda under Alves lost to Adelaide by thirty-one points in the 1997 AFL Grand Final. This earned Alves the AFL Coach of the Year award. In the 1998 season, St Kilda under Alves had a great start winning 11 of its first 14 games, but an end of season drop of form saw St Kilda drop down the ladder. St Kilda again qualified for the Finals Series finishing sixth. In the 1998 Finals Series, St Kilda were eliminated by Melbourne In the semi-final. At the end of the 1998 season, Alves was sacked as St Kilda Football Club senior coach. Alves was then replaced by Tim Watson as St Kilda Football Club senior coach.

== Awards ==
On 24 October 2000, Alves was awarded the Australian Sports Medal for his contribution to Australian football. On 26 January 2008, Alves was awarded the Order of Australia Medal for "service to Australian Rules football as a player, coach and commentator, and to the community as a supporter of charitable organisations".

== Statistics ==
=== Playing statistics ===
Legend
G	Goals	K	Kicks	D	Disposals	T	Tackles
B	Behinds	H	Handballs	M	Marks

Season	Team	No.	Games	Totals							Averages (per game)						
Season	Team	No.	Games	G	B	K	H	D	M	T	G	B	K	H	D	M	T
1965	Melbourne	15	12	1	2	115	13	128	32	—N/a	0.1	0.2	9.6	1.1	10.7	2.7	—N/a
1966	Melbourne	15	18	2	12	254	44	298	63	—N/a	0.1	0.7	14.1	2.4	16.6	3.5	—N/a
1967	Melbourne	15	18	7	5	296	48	344	83	—N/a	0.4	0.3	16.4	2.7	19.1	4.6	—N/a
1968	Melbourne	15	18	20	17	278	70	348	74	—N/a	1.1	0.9	15.4	3.9	19.3	4.1	—N/a
1969	Melbourne	15	20	16	20	317	72	389	89	—N/a	0.8	1.0	15.9	3.6	19.5	4.5	—N/a
1970	Melbourne	15	20	3	16	318	84	402	98	—N/a	0.2	0.8	15.9	4.2	20.1	4.9	—N/a
1971	Melbourne	15	18	9	17	276	81	357	92	—N/a	0.5	0.9	15.3	4.5	19.8	5.1	—N/a
1972	Melbourne	15	21	22	14	373	62	435	136	—N/a	1.0	0.7	17.8	3.0	20.7	6.5	—N/a
1973	Melbourne	15	22	29	27	318	83	401	120	—N/a	1.3	1.2	14.5	3.8	18.2	5.5	—N/a
1974	Melbourne	15	21	11	24	343	114	457	123	—N/a	0.5	1.1	16.3	5.4	21.8	5.9	—N/a
1975	Melbourne	15	20	26	19	320	97	417	105	—N/a	1.3	1.1	16.8	5.1	22.0	5.5	—N/a
1976	Melbourne	15	18	14	19	225	120	345	73	—N/a	0.8	1.1	12.5	6.7	19.2	4.1	—N/a
1977	North Melbourne	2	16	3	11	223	81	304	84	—N/a	0.2	0.7	13.9	5.1	19.0	5.3	—N/a
1978	North Melbourne	2	6	2	3	74	22	96	27	—N/a	0.3	0.5	12.3	3.7	16.0	4.5	—N/a
1979	North Melbourne	2	18	9	14	210	84	294	66	—N/a	0.5	0.8	11.7	4.7	16.3	3.7	—N/a
Career			266	174	220	3940	1075	5015	1265	—N/a	0.7	0.8	14.9	4.1	18.9	4.8	—N/a

=== Coaching statistics ===
Legend
W	Wins	L	Losses	D	Draws	W%	Winning percentage	LP	Ladder position	LT	League teams

Season	Team	Games	W	L	D	W %	LP	LT
1994	St Kilda	22	7	14	1	34.1%	13	15
1995	St Kilda	22	8	14	0	36.4%	14	16
1996	St Kilda	22	10	12	0	45.5%	10	16
1997	St Kilda	25	17	8	0	68.0%	1	16
1998	St Kilda	24	13	11	0	54.2%	6	16
Career totals		115	55	59	1	48.3%		
