= Xavier Tanner =

Australian rules footballer (born 1956)

Personal information
- Born: 2 May 1956 (age 70)
- Original team: Wodonga (OMFL)
- Height: 183 cm (6 ft 0 in)
- Weight: 78 kg (172 lb)

Playing career^{1}
Years	Club	Games (Goals)
1976–1983	North Melbourne	100 (68)
1984–1985	Melbourne	11 (5)
Total		111 (73)
- ^{1} Playing statistics correct to the end of 1985.

Xavier Tanner (born 2 May 1956) is a former Australian rules footballer who played with North Melbourne and Melbourne in the Victorian Football League (VFL).

A centreman, Tanner was recruited to the VFL from Wodonga in the Ovens & Murray Football League. He played in North Melbourne's 1977 premiership side and their losing grand final the following season. After exactly 100 games with North Melbourne he joined his old coach Ron Barassi at Melbourne in 1984 and spent the last two seasons of his career with them.

Tanner was coach of the Murray Bushrangers Football Club in the Under 18 TAC Cup between 2001 and 2005.

Tanner was an assistant principal at Wanganui Park Secondary College in Shepparton, Victoria until its close in 2020.

Tanner's father, Gerald Tanner, played one game for Richmond in 1941.
