= Robbie McGhie =

Australian rules footballer

Robert McGhie

Personal information
- Nicknames: Robbie, Bones
- Born: 18 August 1951 (age 75)
- Original team: Tottenham Technical School
- Height: 192 cm (6 ft 4 in)
- Weight: 86 kg (190 lb)

Playing career^{1}
Years	Club	Games (Goals)
1969–1972	Footscray	37 (6)
1973–1978	Richmond	81 (0)
1979	Footscray	12 (0)
1980–1981	South Melbourne	16 (1)
Total		146 (7)
- ^{1} Playing statistics correct to the end of 1981.

Career highlights
- Richmond Premiership Player 1973, 1974; Richmond Reserves Premiership Player 1977

Robert 'Robbie' McGhie (born 18 August 1951) is a former Australian rules football player who played in the VFL between 1969 and 1972 and again in 1979 for the Footscray Football Club, from 1973 to 1978 for the Richmond Football Club and in 1980 and 1981 for the South Melbourne Football Club. McGhie was appointed coach of the Sunshine Football Club in the VFA for the 1990 season, but the club was unable to convince the VFA to restore its licence to compete (it had been revoked about a month before McGhie's appointment) so he never coached the club in a game.
