= John Einsiedel =

Australian rules footballer

Personal information
- Full name: John Einsiedel
- Born: 18 June 1954 (age 72)
- Original team: Caulfield
- Height: 183 cm (6 ft 0 in)
- Weight: 78 kg (172 lb)

Playing career^{1}
| Years | Club | Games (Goals) |
| 1978 | Richmond | 11 (1) |
- ^{1} Playing statistics correct to the end of 1978.

John Einsiedel (born 18 June 1954) is a former Australian rules footballer who played with Richmond in the Victorian Football League (VFL).

Einsiedel captained the Caulfield Under-19s to a premiership in 1973 and played for the senior side in the Victorian Football Association (VFA), before coming to Richmond.

He played 11 league games for Richmond, all in the 1978 VFL season.

In 1987 he coached Caulfield for what would be their final season in the VFA. He finished his VFA career with 212 games for Caulfield.
