= Ricky Barham =

Australian rules footballer (born 1958)

Personal information
- Born: 28 November 1958 (age 67)
- Original team: South Warrnambool

Playing career^{1}
Years	Club	Games (Goals)
1977–1986	Collingwood	151 (140)
- ^{1} Playing statistics correct to the end of 1986.

Richard 'Ricky' Barham (born 28 November 1958) is a former Australian rules footballer who played in the Victorian Football League (VFL).

Recruited from South Warrnambool, Barham had a successful career early with Collingwood Football Club as a quick wingman. He could find the ball and his skills were sound, but his pace was his main asset. He debuted in 1977 against Hawthorn and kicked five goals from the wing against Rodney Eade. Ultimately while Barham played in five grand finals, including both 1977 Grand Finals he never won a premiership. Barham played 151 VFL games over 10 seasons before retiring in 1986 to tour Australia with then partner Wendy Freer, who he later married and had two children, Jaxson and Charlie.

Later Barham worked for 15 years as the National Recruiting Manager for the Sydney Swans. During his time at the Swans Barham drafted a majority of the club's most successful players, including Adam Goodes, Brett Kirk, Barry Hall, Jude Bolton and Tadhg Kennelly. In the Swans Grand Final victory, 21 of the team's 28 listed players were drafted under Barham's recruitment.

Son Jaxson followed in his father's footsteps to Collingwood, being drafted in 2007 AFL draft under the father–son rule.
