= Doug Gott =

Australian sportsman

- Born: Douglas Lawrence Gott; 30 June 1950 (age 76); Melbourne, Victoria
Australian rules football career
Personal information
- Original team: Ivanhoe Amateurs (VAFA)
- Height: 191 cm (6 ft 3 in)
- Weight: 85 kg (187 lb)
Playing career^{1}
Years	Club	Games (Goals)
1969–1977	Collingwood	97 (26)
- ^{1} Playing statistics correct to the end of 1977.
- Cricket career

Cricket information
- Batting: Right-handed
- Bowling: Right-arm fast-medium

Domestic team information
- Years: Team
- 1973–74: Victoria
- First-class debut: 30 November 1973 Victoria v New Zealanders
- Last First-class: 18 January 1974 Victoria v New South Wales
- Only List A: 11 November 1973 Victoria v Western Australia

Career statistics
Competition	First-class	List A
Matches	4	1
Runs scored	33	34
Batting average	–	–
100s/50s	0/0	0/0
Top score	21*	34*
Balls bowled	824	64
Wickets	9	0
Bowling average	45.33	–
5 wickets in innings	0	0
10 wickets in match	0	n/a
Best bowling	2/28	0/20
Catches/stumpings	4/–	1/–
- Source: CricketArchive, 16 December 2009

Douglas Lawrence Gott (born 30 June 1950 in Melbourne) is a former Australian sportsman who played Australian rules football for Collingwood in the VFL and cricket for Victoria.

A left footed defender, Gott also played several games as a centre half forward. He played in the drawn 1977 VFL Grand Final but didn't appear in the replay due to a cracked kneecap. It turned out to be a career-ending injury and he never managed another senior game.

Gott was also a talented cricketer and played in four first-class matches for Victoria in the 1973–74 summer and took nine wickets.

== See also ==
- List of Victoria first-class cricketers
