= Tony Jewell (footballer) =

Australian rules footballer and coach

Personal information
- Full name: Tony Jewell
- Nickname: TJ
- Born: 8 December 1943 (age 82)
- Original teams: Caulfield (VFA); Oakleigh (VFA)
- Height: 185 cm (6 ft 1 in)
- Weight: 83 kg (183 lb)

Playing career^{1}
Years	Club	Games (Goals)
1961–1963	Oakleigh	46 (87)
1964–1970	Richmond	80 (16)
1971–1976	Caulfield	38 (68)
Total		164 (171)

Coaching career^{3}
Years	Club	Games (W–L–D)
1979–1981	Richmond	69 (41–27–1)
1983–1984	St Kilda	26 (5–21–0)
1986–1987	Richmond	44 (12–32–0)
Total		139 (58–80–1)
- ^{1} Playing statistics correct to the end of 1970.^{3} Coaching statistics correct as of 1987.

Career highlights
- Richmond premiership player 1967; Richmond premiership coach 1980; Richmond Hall of Fame, inducted 2002

Tony 'TJ' Jewell (born 8 December 1943) is a former Australian rules football player who played in the VFL between 1964 and 1970 for the Richmond Football Club.

== Playing career ==
=== Richmond Football Club ===
He was recruited from Oakleigh in the VFA where he had led the club's goalkicking in 1962 and was placed 4th in the VFA's best & fairest award, the J. J. Liston Trophy, in 1963. Jewell played for Richmond Football Club, where he played a total of 80 games between 1964 and 1970.

== Coaching career ==
His initial coaching experience after leaving Richmond was with Caulfield then in the second division of VFA. He led them to the 2nd division premiership and promotion to the top division in 1973.

=== Richmond Football Club ===
He was senior coach of Richmond from 1979 to 1981, which included winning the 1980 premiership, but was sacked to make way for Francis Bourke. He later returned to coach the Richmond Football Club as senior coach in his second stint from 1986 to 1987.

=== St Kilda Football Club ===
He was also senior coach of St Kilda in 1983 and 1984.
