= Andrew Ireland (footballer) =

Australian rules footballer and administrator

Personal information
- Born: 7 March 1953 (age 73); London, England
- Original team: Ivanhoe Amateurs (VAFA)
- Height: 191 cm (6 ft 3 in)
- Weight: 81 kg (179 lb)

Playing career^{1}
Years	Club	Games (Goals)
1975–1980	Collingwood	110 (29)
- ^{1} Playing statistics correct to the end of 1980.

Andrew Ireland (born 7 March 1953) is a former Australian rules footballer and administrator. who played for the Collingwood Football Club in the Victorian Football League (VFL). He played 110 senior games for the Collingwood Football Club in the Victorian Football League (VFL) between 1975 and 1980, appearing in three grand finals. After retiring from playing at the age of 27, Ireland became a football administrator, and was chief executive officer of the Brisbane Bears and later the merged Brisbane Lions (1990–2001), and general manager of football operations at the Sydney Swans (2002–2018).

== Early life ==
Ireland was born in London, England, and migrated with his family to Australia at the age of four. He played his junior football with Ivanhoe before being recruited to Collingwood.

== Playing career ==
Ireland debuted for Collingwood in 1975 and played primarily as a half back flanker after starting as a forward, where he kicked 17 goals in his first season. He appeared in 110 senior games and was part of Collingwood sides that lost the 1977, 1979 and 1980 VFL Grand Finals. In 1978, he represented Victoria in an interstate match against Tasmania.

== Administration career ==
Following his retirement in 1980, Ireland moved into football administration. He became chief executive officer of the Brisbane Bears in 1990 and continued in the role following the club's 1996 merger with Fitzroy, overseeing the early years of the Brisbane Lions until 2001.

In 2002, Ireland joined the Sydney Swans as general manager of football operations, a position he held until 2018. During this time the club enjoyed sustained success, reaching four grand finals and winning premierships in 2005 and 2012.
