= John Sutcliffe (umpire) =

Australian football umpire

John Robert Sutcliffe (born 22 February 1944) is a former Australian football umpire who officiated in over 200 games in the Victorian Football League between 1970 and 1981. He was inducted into the AFL Umpire's Hall of Fame in 2010.
