= AFL Umpires Association =

Organisation representing Australian rules football umpires

- Australian Football League Umpires Association
- Founded: 1909
- Key people: Rob Kerr (CEO); Shaun Ryan (President); Andrew Stephens (Vice President)
- Website: aflua.com.au

The AFL Umpires Association (AFLUA) is the representative body for Australian Football League umpires.

== History ==
The AFLUA was founded in 1909. The Association's current (as of 2021) CEO is Rob Kerr. Past CEOs include Bill Deller and R. A. Anderson.
