= Greg Strachan =

Australian rules footballer

Personal information
- Born: 5 September 1958 (age 68)
- Original team: Camberwell Grammar
- Height: 188 cm (6 ft 2 in)
- Weight: 89 kg (196 lb)

Playing career^{1}
Years	Club	Games (Goals)
1978–1988	Richmond	154 (8)
- ^{1} Playing statistics correct to the end of 1988.

Career highlights
- Richmond - Runner-up Best & Fairest 1981; Richmond - Premiership Player 1980; Richmond - Under 19s Premiership Player 1977; Richmond - Under 19s Best & Fairest 1977

Greg Strachan (born 5 September 1958) is a former Australian rules football player who played in the Victorian Football League (VFL) between 1978 and 1988 for the Richmond Football Club.

Strachan is currently working as an optometrist in his own business in Balwyn, Victoria.
