= Bill Deller =

Australian rules football referee (born 1943)

William R. Deller OAM (born 3 November 1943 in Williamstown, Victoria) is a former Australian rules football field umpire and administrator who officiated over 200 matches in the Victorian Football League (VFL) from 1967 to 1981, and then served as Director of Umpiring from 1982 to 1997.

== Early years ==
Born and raised in Williamstown, Deller began his football involvement with the Williamstown Football Club, where his father was a player and later trainer.

Deller played football and cricket at school and for local clubs Spotswood and Kingsville. He was encouraged to try his hand at the whistle after a friend recommended he attend the VFL's umpiring summer school for umpires. After graduating, Deller began his umpiring career in 1963 in the Dandenong juniors. By 1965, he was umpiring in the VFL reserves.

His talent was recognized by observers, but questions remained about his fitness. At this time, Deller was still playing cricket in the summer. As a result, he lacked the endurance that a strong pre-season running program would have provided. Deller decided to concentrate on football, but was able to maintain his cricket commitments with the then Victorian Football League Umpires Association (VFLUA) club.

Embarking on a training program with former VFL boundary umpire Arthur Cook, Deller's fitness and endurance improved significantly. By 1967, he was ready to umpire in the senior grade.

== VFL umpiring career ==
Deller made his VFL senior grade debut in round 17 of the 1967 VFL season in a match between Essendon and Footscray at Windy Hill, a match in which the police attempted to arrest the Essendon runner, whom they mistook for a pitch invader from the crowd. Deller umpired his first finals match in 1971 – the second semi final between Hawthorn and St Kilda. He umpired his first Grand Final the following year between Carlton and Richmond.

In 1974, Deller suffered a severe back injury which ruled him out for the entire season. He returned to action midway through the 1975 VFL season, and in 1976 was appointed along with Kevin Smith to co-umpire the Grand Final. This was the first Grand Final to be run by two field umpires.

Deller retired from umpiring at the end of the 1981 VFL season. In total he umpired 251 senior VFL matches. This included 20 finals matches, five of which were Grand Finals.

== Director of Umpiring ==
Immediately after retirement, Deller replaced Harry Beitzel as the part-time VFL Director of Umpiring. From 1987 to 1997, he was the Australian Football League (AFL) National Director of Umpiring. During his time in charge, Deller oversaw a series of major changes including:

- The establishment of formalized courses of national accreditation for all categories of umpires in Australian rules football;
- The introduction of a third field umpire; and
- The introduction of video evidence to assist with player reports and tribunal hearings.

In recognition of his on-field and off-field achievements, Deller has received numerous awards, including life membership of the AFL Umpires Association in 1975 and the AFL in 1993. In 1995, he was awarded the Order of Australia Medal for his services to Australian rules football. Deller was one of the first umpires to be inducted into the Australian Football Hall of Fame in 1996.
