= Arnold Briedis =

Australian rules footballer

Personal information
- Born: 20 August 1955 (age 71)
- Original team: Paramount
- Height: 189 cm (6 ft 2 in)
- Weight: 86 kg (190 lb)

Playing career^{1}
| Years | Club | Games (Goals) |
| 1972–1983 | North Melbourne | 161 (279) |
- ^{1} Playing statistics correct to the end of 1983.

Career highlights
- North Melbourne premiership player 1975, 1977; North Melbourne leading goalkicker 1980

Arnold Briedis (born 20 August 1955) is a former Australian rules footballer who played for North Melbourne in the VFL during the 1970s.

A centre half-forward, Briedis was a member of North Melbourne's inaugural premiership side in 1975, kicking 5 goals in the grand final. In the 1977 VFL Grand Final, Briedis kicked seven points, and his inaccuracy at goal nearly cost North Melbourne the premiership when they drew with Collingwood; however, Briedis made amends by becoming the club's leading goalkicker in the decider when he kicked accurately with 5 goals. His tally of 38 goals in finals football was a record for North Melbourne until it was passed by Wayne Carey in the 1990s.

He is the older brother of North Melbourne teammate Robert Briedis.
