= Ken Montgomery =

Australian rules footballer

Personal information
- Born: 5 January 1951 (age 75); Melbourne
- Original team: Pascoe Vale (EDFL)
- Height: 184 cm (6 ft 0 in)
- Weight: 82 kg (181 lb)

Playing career^{1}
Years	Club	Games (Goals)
1968–1981	North Melbourne	189 (2)
- ^{1} Playing statistics correct to the end of 1981.

Career highlights
- Syd Barker medalist in 1972; Premiership player in 1977; Victorian representative in 1978

Ken Montgomery (born 5 January 1951) is a former Australian rules footballer who played for North Melbourne in the VFL.

A reliable half back flanker, with an unusual kicking style, Montgomery was a winning premiership player with North Melbourne in 1977, having missed out on their finals matches for the previous two years. He won the 1972 Syd Barker Medal for the club's best and fairest player and also represented Victoria in 1978. Montgomery's father, grandfather and cousin also represented the North Melbourne Football Club. Ken Montgomery was one of the youngest players to play a senior game with North Melbourne, when in 1968 he played when he was 16 years old. In later years he was in an administrative role at the club. He lives in Echuca where he operates a houseboat company called Murray River Houseboats.
