= 1982 Carlton Football Club season =

Carlton Football Club
1982 season
- President: Ian Rice
- Coach: David Parkin
- Captain: Mike Fitzpatrick
- Home ground: Princes Park
- Escort Cup: Semi-finals
- VFL season: 3rd (16–5–1)
- Finals series: Premiers
- Robert Reynolds Trophy: Jim Buckley
- Leading goalkicker: Ross Ditchburn (61)

The 1982 Carlton Football Club season was the Carlton Football Club's 119th season of competition, and 86th as a member of the Victorian Football League. Carlton fielded teams in the senior, reserves and under-19s grades of the 1982 VFL season, and its senior team also contested the 1982 Escort Championships.

Carlton won the senior VFL premiership, defeating Richmond in the grand final. It was the club's second senior VFL premiership in a row, its third in four years, and the 14th in the club's history.

== Club summary ==
The 1982 VFL season was the 86th season of the VFL competition since its inception in 1897; and, having competed in every season, it was also the 86th season contested by the Carlton Football Club. As it had been since 1897, the club's home ground was Princes Park in North Carlton; additionally, it was standard for all clubs in the league at the time to play three or four matches per year at the neutral VFL Park in Mulgrave. In addition to contesting the VFL premiership, the Carlton senior team contested the 1982 Escort Championships, which ran concurrently with the premiership season. Carlton also fielded teams in both the VFL reserves competition (the Statewide Cup) and the VFL under-19s competition.

Carlton's key senior personnel were all unchanged from 1981: Ian Rice as club president, David Parkin as senior coach, and Mike Fitzpatrick as captain. Australian Prime Minister Malcolm Fraser was the club's No. 1 ticket holder.

== Squad and player statistics for 1982 ==
The following is the final senior squad as announced at the start of the 1982 season, plus mid-season transfers. Numbers in parentheses represent games played and goals kicked for Carlton in the 1982 VFL premiership season.

Carlton Football Club
Senior list		Coaching staff
1 Greg Wells (11,2); 2 Warren Jones (24,4); 3 Mike Fitzpatrick (23,22) (c); 4 Peter Bosustow (24,47); 5 Ken Sheldon (18,12); 6 Mario Bortolotto (11,0); 6 Rod Waddell (2,0); 7 Wayne Johnston (22,40); 8 Ross Ditchburn (13,61); 9 Ken Hunter (21,13); 11 Bruce Doull (26,2); 12 Barry Armstrong (0,0); 13 Phil Maylin (26,17); 14 Rod Ashman (24,46); 15 Val Perovic (24,1); 16 Jim Buckley (20,14); 17 Robert Dutton (0,0); 18 Allan Montgomery (2,2); 20 Geoff Southby (20,0); 21 Rod Austin (13,0); 22 Robbert Klomp (24,6); 23 Paul Meldrum (2,1)	24 Brendan Hartney (6,0); 25 Frank Marchesani (16,10); 26 David Clarke (9,21); 27 Des English (14,1); 28 Spiro Kourkoumelis (6,2); 29 Greg Sharp (0,0); 30 Graeme Whitnall (0,0); 31 Stephen Easton (1,0); 32 David Glascott (24,7); 33 Peter McConville (20,19); 34 Alex Marcou (25,33); 35 Denis Lenaghan (1,2); 36 Mark Maclure (12,18); 37 Wayne Harmes (21,14); 38 Shane Robertson (0,0); 39 Stephen Buckley (0,0); 40 Scott Howell (11,6); 44 Ross Addlem (0,0); 48 Geoff Hocking (0,0); 55 Mark Buckley (4,6); Mark Kerr (0,0); M. Lenaghan (0,0)	Head coach: David Parkin; Legend: (c) Captain(s); (vc) Vice-captain(s); Updated: Source(s):

== Playing list changes ==
The following summarises player transfers to and from the club between the conclusion of the 1981 season and the conclusion of the 1982 season.

=== In ===
Player	Previous club	League	Comments
(Victoria (state)) Ross Addlem	Serpentine
(Western Australia) Ross Ditchburn	Kukerin	Central Great Southern FL	Previously played for Claremont (WAFL)
(Victoria (state)) Stephen Easton	North Melbourne	VFL
(Western Australia) Allan Montgomery	Perth	WAFL
(Victoria (state)) Spiro Kourkoumelis	Carlton U19s	VFL U19s
(Victoria (state)) M. Lenaghan	Sandhurst	Bendigo FL	Country zone selection
(Victoria (state)) Paul Meldrum	Princes Hill	VAFA
(Victoria (state)) David Clarke	Geelong	VFL	Cleared to Carlton shortly before the start of the season
(Victoria (state)) Shane Robertson	Carlton U19s	VFL U19s	Elevated from the junior list prior to the Escort Cup quarter-final

=== Out ===
Player	New Club	League	Comments
(Victoria (state)) Kevin Heath	Newton (NSW)
(Victoria (state)) Trevor Keogh			Retired
(Victoria (state)) David McKay			Retired
(Victoria (state)) Rod Waddell	Geelong	VFL	Cleared prior to Round 11
(Victoria (state)) Stephen Buckley	Brunswick	VFA	Cleared at approximately Round 15

== Season summary ==
=== Pre-season matches ===
Carlton played four competitive matches in the lead-up to the 1982 VFL season – three practice matches and an Escort Cup match.

**Date**	**Opponent**	**Scores** (Carlton's scores indicated in **bold**)			**Venue**	**Attendance**
**Date**	**Opponent**	Home	Away	Result	**Venue**	**Attendance**
Sunday, 7 March	Richmond	27.10 (172)	**23.23 (161)**	Lost by 11 points	Swan Hill Showgrounds (A)	
Saturday, 13 March	Claremont	15.13 (103)	**23.16 (154)**	Won by 51 points	Perth Oval (A)	
Tuesday, 16 March (8:30 pm)	Escort Championships first round match against Port Adelaide – see details below					
Saturday, 20 March	Hawthorn	**13.13 (91)**	8.9 (57)	Won by 34 points	Princes Park (H)	

=== Home-and-away season ===
Carlton entered the season as the defending premiers. After a slow start, Carlton climbed to the top of the ladder and cemented its position as premiership favourites with nine consecutive wins (plus one in the Escort Cup) between rounds 3 and 11. The Blues then suffered two heavy losses in three weeks against Essendon and Hawthorn, dropping to second on the ladder, and causing the media to question whether Carlton was still a realistic premiership contender. Their form remained patchy, and after heavy upset losses to Geelong and the Swans, Carlton dropped to third. They were considered a serious risk of losing the double chance, with difficult games in the last three weeks of the season, but an upset win over first-placed Richmond in round 20, and an unexpectedly heavy victory over fifth-placed North Melbourne saw Carlton hold onto third place, and regain form going into the finals.

**Round**	**Date and local time**	**Opponent**	**Scores** (Carlton's scores indicated in **bold**)			**Venue**	**Attendance**	**Ladder** **position**
**Round**	**Date and local time**	**Opponent**	Home	Away	Result	**Venue**	**Attendance**	**Ladder** **position**
1	Saturday, 27 March (2:10 pm)	Fitzroy	**16.17 (113)**	17.11 (113)	Match drawn	Princes Park (H)	26,669	6th
2	Saturday, 3 April (2:10 pm)	Essendon	**8.17 (65)**	13.13 (91)	Lost by 26 points	VFL Park (H)	60,208	9th
3	Saturday, 10 April (2:10 pm)	Collingwood	13.16 (94)	**20.8 (128)**	Won by 34 points	Victoria Park (A)	34,055	7th
4	Saturday, 17 April (2:10 pm)	Hawthorn	**21.22 (148)**	12.15 (87)	Won by 61 points	Princes Park (H)	29,654	5th
5	Saturday, 24 April (2:10 pm)	Melbourne	9.12 (66)	**9.22 (76)**	Won by 10 points	M.C.G. (A)	26,950	4th
6	Saturday, 1 May (2:10 pm)	St Kilda	11.14 (80)	**16.22 (118)**	Won by 38 points	Moorabbin Oval (A)	26,185	3rd
7	Saturday, 8 May (2:10 pm)	Geelong	**15.20 (110)**	7.7 (49)	Won by 61 points	Princes Park (H)	28,742	2nd
8	Saturday, 15 May (2:10 pm)	Footscray	11.11 (77)	**14.22 (106)**	Won by 29 points	Western Oval (A)	17,903	2nd
9	Saturday, 22 May (2:10 pm)	South Melbourne	**27.23 (185)**	12.11 (83)	Won by 102 points	Princes Park (H)	23,954	2nd
	Tuesday, 25 May (8:30 pm)	Escort Championships quarter final against Fitzroy – see details below						
10	Saturday, 29 May (2:10 pm)	Richmond	**18.16 (124)**	16.11 (107)	Won by 17 points	Princes Park (H)	35,372	1st
11	Saturday, 5 June (2:10 pm)	North Melbourne	13.18 (96)	**15.15 (105)**	Won by 9 points	Arden Street Oval (A)	23,448	1st
12	Monday, 14 June (2:10 pm)	Essendon	19.12 (126)	**8.18 (66)**	Lost by 60 points	Windy Hill (A)	33,792	2nd
13	Saturday, 19 June (2:10 pm)	Collingwood	**12.26 (98)**	9.17 (71)	Won by 27 points	Princes Park (H)	30,346	2nd
14	Saturday, 26 June (2:10 pm)	Hawthorn	17.14 (116)	**12.10 (82)**	Lost by 34 points	Princes Park (A)	23,354	2nd
	Tuesday, 29 June (8:30 pm)	Escort Championships semi final against North Melbourne – see details below						
15	Saturday, 3 July (2:10 pm)	Melbourne	**18.20 (128)**	16.15 (111)	Won by 17 points	Princes Park (H)	21,971	2nd
16	Saturday, 10 July (2:10 pm)	St Kilda	**21.13 (139)**	9.9 (63)	Won by 76 points	VFL Park (H)	27,829	2nd
17	Saturday, 24 July (2:10 pm)	Geelong	16.19 (115)	**11.9 (75)**	Lost by 40 points	Kardinia Park (A)	19,892	2nd
18	Saturday, 31 July (2:10 pm)	Footscray	**30.21 (201)**	10.12 (72)	Won by 129 points	Princes Park (H)	17,564	2nd
19	Sunday, 8 August (2:10 pm)	Swans (Note: The South Melbourne Football Club, which was in transition as it moved to Sydney to become the Sydney Swans, was still known as South Melbourne when Carlton first played against it in round 9; after 2 June, they were known as simply the Swans. It formally became the Sydney Swans prior to the 1983 season.)	15.16 (106)	**9.18 (72)**	Lost by 34 points	S.C.G. (A)	25,601	3rd
20	Saturday, 14 August (2:10 pm)	Richmond	9.10 (64)	**13.14 (92)**	Won by 28 points	M.C.G. (A)	71,203	3rd
21	Saturday, 21 August (2:10 pm)	North Melbourne	**26.24 (180)**	17.8 (110)	Won by 70 points	Princes Park (H)	28,207	3rd
22	Saturday, 26 August (2:10 pm)	Fitzroy	17.9 (111)	**23.12 (150)**	Won by 39 points	VFL Park (A)	46,130	3rd

=== Finals series ===
Despite being below Hawthorn on the ladder, Carlton's form in the final rounds of the home-and-away season meant it was favourite to win the qualifying final, which it did by a comfortable margin. They were then comprehensively beaten by minor premiers Richmond in the second semi-final; Richmond led by 30 points at quarter time, and the final margin of 23 points was not reflective of Richmond's overall dominance on the day.

The preliminary final against Hawthorn was a tough, ugly game of football which divided opinions; the Sun reporters Lou Richards and Tom Prior were critical of both teams for their poor skills, but their Sun colleague Don Scott described it as a classic preliminary final, finding the tightly defensive contest enthralling. Only five goals were scored in the first half arm-wrestle, before Carlton opened up a big lead with six goals to two in the third quarter, ultimately winning by 31 points.

In the grand final, Richmond led a close game by 11 points at half time, aided by Carlton's inaccurate goalkicking – the score was 9.4 (58) to 6.11 (47). Carlton then added five goals to zero in the third quarter to lead by 17 points, maintaining roughly this margin to the final siren to win the premiership.

**Week**	**Date and local time**	**Opponent**	**Scores** (Carlton's scores indicated in **bold**)			**Venue**	**Attendance**
**Week**	**Date and local time**	**Opponent**	Home	Away	Result	**Venue**	**Attendance**
Qualifying Final	Saturday, 4 September (2:30 pm)	Hawthorn	16.9 (105)	**25.13 (163)**	Won by 58 points	M.C.G. (A)	70,552
Second Semi-final	Saturday, 11 September (2:30 pm)	Richmond	16.17 (113)	**13.12 (90)**	Lost by 23 points	VFL Park (A)	65,611
Preliminary Final	Saturday, 18 September (2:30 pm)	Hawthorn	**13.16 (94)**	8.15 (63)	Won by 31 points	VFL Park (H)	61,307
Grand Final	Saturday, 25 September (2:50 pm)	Richmond	12.13 (85)	**14.19 (103)**	Won by 18 points	M.C.G. (A)	107,536

=== Commonwealth Games ===
Eleven days after the season was over, Carlton played a grand final rematch against Richmond as a demonstration sport at the 1982 Commonwealth Games in Brisbane. Richmond won the high-scoring match by eighteen points.

**Week**	**Date**	**Opponent**	**Scores** (Carlton's scores indicated in **bold**)			**Venue**	**Attendance**
**Week**	**Date**	**Opponent**	Carlton	Opponent	Result	**Venue**	**Attendance**
Commonwealth Games	Wednesday, 6 October	Richmond	**26.10 (166)**	28.16 (184)	Lost by 18 points	Gabba (N)	15,000 (approx.)

=== Escort Championships ===
Carlton participated in the 1982 Escort Championships, which ran concurrently with the VFL season. Carlton reached the semi-final stage before being eliminated by North Melbourne.

**Week**	**Date and local time**	**Opponent**	**Scores** (Carlton's scores indicated in **bold**)			**Venue**	**Attendance**
**Week**	**Date and local time**	**Opponent**	Carlton	Opponent	Result	**Venue**	**Attendance**
Round of 16	Tuesday, 16 March (8:30 pm)	Port Adelaide	**14.16 (100)**	5.6 (36)	Won by 64 points	VFL Park (N)	6,220
Quarter-final	Tuesday, 25 May (8:30 pm)	Fitzroy	**12.14 (86)**	12.8 (80)	Won by 6 points	VFL Park (N)	7,063
Semi-final	Tuesday, 29 June (8:30 pm)	North Melbourne	**8.13 (61)**	13.12 (90)	Lost by 29 points	VFL Park (N)	5,642

== Ladder ==
(P)	Premiers
	Qualified for finals

#	Team	P	W	L	D	PF	PA	%	Pts
1	Richmond	22	18	4	0	2682	2125	126.2	72
2	Hawthorn	22	17	5	0	2828	2149	131.6	68
3	Carlton (P)	22	16	5	1	2561	2008	127.5	66
4	Essendon	22	16	6	0	2576	2057	125.2	64
5	North Melbourne	22	14	8	0	2693	2458	109.6	56
6	Fitzroy	22	12	9	1	2614	2550	102.5	50
7	Swans	22	12	10	0	2621	2537	103.3	48
8	Melbourne	22	8	14	0	2488	2752	90.4	32
9	Geelong	22	7	15	0	2073	2293	90.4	28
10	Collingwood	22	4	18	0	2201	2575	85.5	16
11	St Kilda	22	4	18	0	2188	3052	71.7	16
12	Footscray	22	3	19	0	2066	3035	68.1	12

Rules for classification: 1. premiership points; 2. percentage; 3. points for
Average score: 112.1
Source: AFL Tables

== Premiership team ==
The Carlton premiership twenty was as below.

1982 Carlton Premiership team
B:	27 Des English	6 Mario Bortolotto	15 Val Perovic
HB:	33 Peter McConville	11 Bruce Doull	9 Ken Hunter
C:	37 Wayne Harmes	16 Jim Buckley	32 David Glascott
HF:	7 Wayne Johnston	36 Mark Maclure	14 Rod Ashman
F:	23 Mike Fitzpatrick (c)	8 Ross Ditchburn	34 Alex Marcou
Foll:	2 Warren Jones	13 Phil Maylin	5 Ken Sheldon
Int:	4 Peter Bosustow	22 Robbert Klomp	
Coach:	David Parkin		

For the second consecutive season, both Geoff Southby and Rod Austin were missing from the premiership team due to injury. Southby was injured in the semi-final, as he had been in 1981; Austin had been widely considered best on ground in the preliminary final, but was hospitalised after he suffered a flare-up of a groin complaint which he had carried into that match.

== Notable events ==
Controversial finish in round 1 draw against Fitzroy

In the round 1 match at Princes Park, Fitzroy overcame a 32-point half-time deficit to hit the lead late in the match, but Carlton drew the game with a behind on the final siren from Greg Wells. Fitzroy complained about the game-tying behind for three separate reasons: that the free kick from which Wells scored the behind was a wrong decision; that after Wells played on, the kick was actually taken after the siren had sounded because the siren wasn't loud enough to be heard; and that the kick, which fell short and went through off the hands of a pack, was deliberately forced through for a score by a Carlton player and should have been a dead ball. There was no formal protest against the result, and the VFL endorsed the umpires' decision in all three cases.

Death of Robert Dickson

Crowd behaviour at VFL matches was put under the spotlight after the death of 28-year-old father Robert Dickson. Dickson, an innocent bystander to a brawl in the crowd of the round 1 match between Carlton and Fitzroy at Princes Park, was king-hit as he tried to protect his six-year-old son from the violence. He was released from hospital after the incident, but suffered an aneurysm a week later and died in hospital in late April. Dickson's autopsy did not connect his aneurysm to the trauma suffered in the brawl, but the incident nevertheless served as a trigger for the VFL and police to review behavioural standards of patrons at VFL matches, which had been poor in recent years. From 4 May, patrons were banned from bringing alcoholic beverages into VFL matches, and were limited to purchasing at most two pre-opened cans at a time from vendors at the ground. The Carlton and Fitzroy Football Clubs and the VFL all donated money to Dickson's widow.

Retirement and reinstatement of Warren Jones

Ruckman Warren Jones retired briefly during the season. He was dropped to the reserves for the round 12 Queen's Birthday Monday match against Essendon after allegedly breaking a team curfew, and submitted a letter of resignation to the club on Tuesday. After meeting with the club hierarchy, he withdrew his resignation on the Thursday, and went on to play in the premiership team three months later.

Wayne Johnston's suspension in the qualifying Final

Wayne Johnston was reported for striking Hawthorn defender David Polkinghorne in the face during the qualifying final. Polkinghorne gave evidence against Johnston at the tribunal, and Johnson was suspended for two matches, meaning that he would potentially miss the grand final if Carlton qualified for it by winning the second Semi-final. There was surprise and some backlash among players and football media about Polkinghorne's frank testimony against Johnston, as there was generally considered to be an unspoken "code of silence" discouraging players giving incriminating evidence against their opponents at the tribunal. As Carlton ultimately lost the second semi-final and won the preliminary final, Johnston was able to come back into the team for the grand final.

Speculation over David Parkin's coaching future

The Collingwood Football Club endured a tumultuous 1982 season, with coach Tommy Hafey sacked at mid-season due to the club's poor on-field performances, followed by a successful spill at board level by a group known as the New Magpies. The media speculated extensively on the new board making a big money move to poach a successful senior coach from another club, and Parkin, whose contract with Carlton was finishing, was one of the key targets. On 20 September, the Sun reported that a deal for Parkin to move to Collingwood in 1983 was all but signed off, only to be forced to publish a retraction two days later when Carlton signed him to remain with the club until 1985.

Streaker at the grand final

The third quarter of the grand final was famously interrupted when Helen d'Amico, a 17-year-old Adelaide-based stripper, streaked onto the field, naked except for a Carlton scarf. She went up to and accosted Bruce Doull, before Wayne Johnston dragged her from the field. d'Amico was fined $1000, and the incident is now a memorable moment of grand final folklore.

Exhibition match at the Commonwealth Games

Early in the season, the VFL arranged for the grand finalists to play a rematch at the 1982 Commonwealth Games, which were being held in Brisbane shortly after the season was finished. Carlton and Richmond faced off in the exhibition match at the Gabba on Wednesday, 6 October, in front of a sell-out crowd of 15,000 – including the Duke of Edinburgh – and an international television audience in the millions.

The Gabba playing surface was much smaller than typical VFL-sized grounds because of the dog track around the perimeter, so it was possible to score from the centre of the ground. This, coupled with the exhibition nature of the match which emphasised spectacular and skillful play ahead of ferocious defence, resulted in a very high scoring match. Carlton kicked eleven goals to four in the third quarter to take a 17-point lead into three-quarter time, before Richmond kicked ten goals to five in the final quarter to win the match by 18 points, 28.16 (184) to 26.10 (166). Richmond received $20,000 as winners of the match; Carlton received $10,000.

== Leading goalkickers ==
Full forward Ross Ditchburn was Carlton's leading goalkicker for 1982, achieving the feat in his first season of VFL football, and despite playing only half of Carlton's matches for the season. A farmer from country Western Australia, Ditchburn had played several seasons of WANFL football, but had returned to his family's farm in his small home town of Kukerin in 1981. He was already tied to Carlton if he ever came to Victoria, and at age 25 he decided he needed to make the attempt at VFL football in 1982 before he became too old to have a reasonable chance at it. Ditchburn initially struggled, and by round 14, he had played only one senior game for one goal, and was considered too slow to play his preferred position of centre half forward at the top level. He was nearly cleared back to Western Australia at mid-season, but was instead moved to full-forward where he was able to cement a regular place in the team for the last twelve games of the season. He kicked a total of 61 goals in his thirteen senior games for the year; he also kicked 44 goals for the reserves, for a season total of 105 goals across both grades.

Player	Goals
Ross Ditchburn	61
Peter Bosustow	47
Rod Ashman	46
Wayne Johnston	40
Alex Marcou	33

== Team awards and records ==
Game records

- Round 9 – Carlton's first quarter score of 12.5 (77) against South Melbourne set a new record for the highest first quarter score in VFL history.
- Round 18 – Carlton's score of 30.21 (201) against Footscray was the second time it had scored more than 200 points in a VFL match.
- Round 18 – Carlton's 129-point win against Footscray set a new record as Carlton's greatest winning margin in a VFL match.
- Round 18 – Carlton's half-time score of 18.11 (119) set a new record for Carlton's highest score in a half of football.
- Round 18 – Carlton's 92-point half-time lead against Footscray was the highest half time lead for any team since tound 2, 1931.
- Season – Carlton's scores of 30.21 (201) in round 18, 27.23 (185) in round 9 and 26.24 (180) in round 21 were at the end of the season the second-highest, third-highest and fourth-highest scores in Carlton's history.

Unofficial game records

Carlton's two exhibition matches against Richmond – the pre-season match in Swan Hill, and the post-season at the Commonwealth Games – were very high scoring. These are not considered formal senior games, but when compared with VFL premiership matches:

- Carlton's losing scores in both matches – 23.23 (161) and 26.10 (166) – were higher than the VFL record at the time, which was 23.19 (157).
- The aggregate score of the post-season match, 54.26 (350), was higher than the VFL record at the time, which was 52.33 (345).

Premiership records

- Carlton won its 14th senior VFL premiership, surpassing Collingwood (13) to become the club with the most senior premierships VFL history. It was the first time Carlton had held the outright premiership lead (after drawing level with Collingwood for the lead in 1981).
- Carlton won back-to-back premierships in 1981–82. It was the first time the club had achieved the feat since 1914–15, and the first time any team had achieved the feat since Richmond in 1973–74.

== Individual awards and records ==
Robert Reynolds Trophy

The Robert Reynolds Trophy for Carlton's senior best and fairest was awarded to Jim Buckley. It was the first and only time that Buckley won the club best and fairest. Buckley won the award despite missing six games, including a horror September in which he suffered bouts of glandular fever, mild hepatitis and a thigh injury, which caused him to miss two finals matches and a significant amount of training; he was in doubt leading up to the Grand Final, but was able to take his place in the premiership team.

Representative honours

There were two interstate matches played during the season: Victoria vs South Australia on 17 May; and Victoria vs Western Australia on 13 July. The matches were played under partial State of Origin rules. Carlton players and coaches who were selected in these games were:

- David Parkin – coached Victoria in both games
- Jim Buckley – represented Victoria against Western Australia
- Mike Fitzpatrick – captained Victoria against South Australia; represented Western Australia against Victoria
- Ken Hunter – represented Victoria against South Australia
- Alex Marcou – represented Victoria against Western Australia
- Phil Maylin – represented South Australia against Victoria

=== Player records ===
- Round 16 – Ross Ditchburn kicked twelve goals against St Kilda. He became the third player to kick twelve goals in a game for the club, after Horrie Clover (13, in 1921) and Greg Kennedy (12, in 1972). Ditchburn achieved the feat in only his third senior VFL appearance.

== Lower grades ==
The Carlton reserves team finished sixth out of twelve teams, narrowly missing the final five with a record of 11–10–1. The Under-19s team finished fifth with 56 premiership points, and was eliminated by Fitzroy in the elimination final to finish fifth overall.

Under-19s finals matches

**Week**	**Date and local time**	**Opponent**	**Scores** (Carlton's scores indicated in **bold**)			**Venue**	**Curtain raiser to**
**Week**	**Date and local time**	**Opponent**	Home	Away	Result	**Venue**	**Curtain raiser to**
Elimination Final	Saturday, 4 September (8:30 am)	Fitzroy	21.10 (136)	**8.3 (51)**	Lost by 85 points	VFL Park (A)	N.M. vs Ess (EF)
