= 1982 VFL grand final =

Grand final of the 1982 Victorian Football League season

1982 VFL Grand Final

Carlton	Richmond
14.19 (103)	12.13 (85)
	1	2	3	4
CARL	4.7 (31)	6.11 (47)	11.15 (81)	14.19 (103)
RICH	4.3 (27)	9.4 (58)	9.10 (64)	12.13 (85)
- Date: 25 September 1982
- Stadium: Melbourne Cricket Ground
- Attendance: 107,536
- Favourite: Richmond
- Umpires: Glenn James, Rowan Sawers

Ceremonies
- National anthem: Rolf Harris

Accolades
- Norm Smith Medallist: Maurice Rioli
- Jock McHale Medallist: David Parkin

Broadcast in Australia
- Network: Seven Network
- Commentators: Peter Landy; Lou Richards; Bob Skilton

The 1982 VFL grand final was an Australian rules football game contested between the Carlton Football Club and Richmond Football Club, held at the Melbourne Cricket Ground in Melbourne on 25 September 1982. It was the 86th annual grand final of the Victorian Football League, staged to determine the premiers for the 1982 VFL season. The match, attended by 107,536 spectators, was won by Carlton.

== Background ==
The previous three premierships had been won by either Richmond or Carlton; Richmond in 1980 and Carlton in 1979 and 1981, all against Collingwood.

The Tigers won eleven successive matches early in the 1982 VFL season and, after a slump as injuries took toll late on the home-and-away rounds, returned to their most devastating form in the finals. At the conclusion of the home-and-away season, Richmond had finished first on the VFL ladder with 18 wins and 4 losses. Carlton had finished third (behind Hawthorn), with 16 wins 5 losses and a draw.

In the finals series leading up to the Grand Final, Carlton defeated Hawthorn by 58 points in the Qualifying Final before losing to Richmond by 40 points in the Second Semi-Final. Carlton advanced to the Grand Final after beating Hawthorn again, this time by 31 points in the Preliminary Final. Richmond advanced straight to the Grand Final on the back of their Second Semi-Final victory against Carlton.

== Teams ==
Austin, considered best afield in the Preliminary final win over Hawthorn, suffered a corked thigh during an informal game of soccer the following day and his subsequent hospitalisation meant he would not play in the Grand Final. This was a bitter blow, considering he had missed out on Carlton's triumph the previous year due to osteitis pubis.

Richmond supporters were also surprised to see that Brian Taylor, who had been named in the provisional line-up on Thursday, had been replaced by emergency player Ian Sartori. Taylor was left out at the last minute when the Tigers match committee felt there was no room for both him and David Cloke in their forward line.

Carlton	Richmond

Carlton
B:	27 Des English	11 Bruce Doull	15 Val Perovic
HB:	6 Mario Bortolotto	9 Ken Hunter	5 Ken Sheldon
C:	32 David Glascott	16 Jim Buckley	37 Wayne Harmes
HF:	4 Peter Bosustow	36 Mark Maclure	7 Wayne Johnston
F:	33 Peter McConville	8 Ross Ditchburn	34 Alex Marcou
Foll:	3 Mike Fitzpatrick (c)	13 Phil Maylin	14 Rod Ashman
Int:	2 Warren Jones	22 Robbert Klomp	
Coach:	David Parkin		

Richmond
B:	34 Graeme Landy	15 Alan Martello	5 Emmett Dunne
HB:	18 Mervyn Keane	20 Jim Jess	19 Greg Strachan
C:	9 Shane Williams	4 Geoff Raines	16 Bryan Wood
HF:	29 Kevin Bartlett	33 David Cloke (c)	17 Maurice Rioli
F:	8 Michael Roach	25 Ian Sartori	3 Dale Weightman
Foll:	1 Mark Lee	2 Robert Wiley	22 Barry Rowlings
Int:	14 Bruce Tempany	31 Peter Welsh	
Coach:	Francis Bourke		

Umpires

The umpiring panel for the match, comprising two field umpires, two boundary umpires and two goal umpires is given below.

1982 VFL Grand Final umpires
Position			Emergency
Field:	Glenn James (1)	Rowan Sawers (1)	
Boundary:	Paul Nicholls (1)	Leigh Paterson (5)	
Goal:	Graham Danne (1)	Ted Johnson (1)	

Numbers in brackets represent the number of grand finals umpired, including 1982.

== Match summary ==
The two coaches adopted contrasting approaches to the pre-match routine. In the Carlton rooms, David Parkin wrote a few key points on the blackboard and made a simple promise to his players that they would win if every one of them worked hard and never stopped trying across the entire game. After his address, Parkin ran one last time the video footage of the team receiving the premiership cup and winners medals after the previous season's triumph. Meanwhile, in the Richmond rooms, Francis Bourke decided to treat the Grand final as just another game. The build-up had been deliberately kept low-key; players were told to forget about the fanfare and occasion and to instead concentrate on the game at hand and attack every contest for the ball as hard as they could.

=== First quarter ===
The Blues started well, with fast play and direct long kicks into attack resulting in goals to Johnston and Harmes inside the opening 70 seconds. As a hailstorm swept across the ground (it would rain sporadically throughout the day), brawls between the two teams began to break out mainly around the outer wing area, resulting in Jones being reported for striking Lee by field umpire Sawers. As the sun reappeared a few minutes later, the Blues again went into attack through Maylin and from the resulting spillage, Blues captain Fitzpatrick was in the right position to soccer the ball barely the required distance onto the chest of the helmeted rover Ashman, who went back and slotted Carlton's third goal in six minutes, with Richmond yet to score.
The Tigers worked their way back into the game using trademark physical aggression–Jess crashed into Hunter with a well-executed hip-and-shoulder, forcing Hunter off the ground for nearly 15 minutes and allowing his direct opponent Rioli to start influencing the game. Richmond finally opened their account when veteran Bartlett converted a free kick set shot for the first of his three goals for the game. Then Rioli kicked two goals in three minutes, the second a magnificent left-foot snap around his body from a boundary throw-in. In between both goals, Harmes had missed a chance to score his second when he hit the post. When Raines was awarded a free kick after Maylin was deemed to be holding the ball and goaled at the 27-minute mark, the Tigers had snatched the lead.
Five minutes passed with no further score added until Carlton launched what would be the final attacking play of the quarter; Fitzpatrick kicked to the lead of full-forward Ditchburn. As Ditchburn fumbled the marking attempt and went to ground, he received an accidental knee to the head from his opponent Martello and had to be helped from the field, taking no further part in the game. As the nearest Carlton player to the incident, Johnston took the free kick, and his accurate set shot put the Blues back in front shortly before the siren sounded.

=== Second quarter ===
The Tigers took the lead in the opening seconds of the quarter when rover Weightman gathered the ball from a marking contest deep in the forward line and handballed cleverly to Cloke to run into an open goal. From the centre bounce, the Tigers were again driven into attack, this time by Keane. Carlton defender McConville gathered the ball but his handpass was intercepted by Weightman who again found Cloke alone in the goal square, enabling him to stroll in and kick his second. When Bartlett gathered the ball from a long kick by Martello and snapped his second goal on his left, Richmond had kicked three goals in four minutes to establish a 14-point lead. Harmes was moved on to Bartlett, but the bigger headache for Carlton was Rioli, whose superb midfield play was providing the Tigers forwards with constant scoring opportunities. The Blues scored against the run of play through Hunter after Bosustow, who had started on the bench, took a spectacular mark and played on immediately, finding Hunter with a well-timed handpass. But further goals to Cloke and Weightman put Richmond 18 points ahead at the 20-minute mark.

The Blues managed to stem the tide with Fitzpatrick now providing a target at centre half-forward, and after McConville, who had been shifted forward, scored an opportunistic goal at the 29-minute mark, the Tigers went into the main break with an 11-point lead. They had conceded momentum and also lost defender Tempany for the rest of the game due to a fractured forearm.

=== Third quarter ===
The atmosphere was tense as both teams ran out to begin the second half; many in the crowd knew that this was the decisive quarter or, as made popular by Carlton coach Parkin, the "premiership quarter"; if the Tigers could extend their half-time lead in the third quarter, the premiership would almost certainly be theirs. In the four seasons leading up to the Grand Final, Carlton had won 64 of the 97 third quarters it had played.

Richmond made their intent to physically unsettle the Blues clear when Jess again hit Hunter, this time with an extended forearm to the face. He was promptly met with an angry response from Doull and Jones. But Carlton continued to focus on attacking the ball and were rewarded with the first goal of the quarter at the 8-minute mark when Maylin picked up the ball from a Richmond clearance, cleverly evaded a tackle and kicked truly. Five minutes later, Fitzpatrick was awarded a dubious holding-the-ball free kick and converted his set shot to put the Blues one point ahead.

Then followed the incident for which this match became famous; as the ball was being brought back for the restart of play, the crowd's attention turned to a female streaker who was naked except for a Carlton scarf around her shoulders. The streaker was later identified as 17-year-old Helen D'Amico, an American-born stripper who had been working in Adelaide, and was fined $1,000. In later years, it was suggested that D'Amico's stunt was partly responsible for stopping Richmond's momentum in this game, but Blues ruckman Warren Jones adamantly rejected this notion:

It threw a spanner in the works because, we were just starting to have a bit of a run-on. She came on and upset our run, it stopped our momentum, not theirs.

After D'Amico was escorted off the ground, it took Carlton five minutes to score their next goal through Maclure, but crucially for them Richmond also failed to take advantage of the disruption. Two minutes later, Fitzpatrick added his second goal when he fortuitously marked a wonky kick into attack from Bosustow. When Ashman was in the right place to goal with a quick snap from a scrappy piece of play, the Blues had scored five goals for the quarter and turned the 11-point half-time deficit into a 17-point lead at the last change.

The forward pressure that Parkin had instilled as part of Carlton's game plan was now paying dividends, and Fitzpatrick had played an immense quarter at centre half-forward. The Carlton coaching panel had also wisely resisted taking Harmes off Bartlett and instead moved Johnston into the middle to take on Raines, who had been among Richmond's best players. The Carlton defence of Perovic, Doull, Bortolotto and English were superb, restricting the Tigers to six behinds for the quarter.

=== Fourth quarter ===
Four minutes into the last quarter, Richmond had slashed Carlton's lead to five points with goals to Bartlett and Jess. But the Blues held out to win, marking the first time since the 1915 VFL Grand Final that they had won back-to-back flags.

=== Aftermath ===
Carlton's premiership victory marked its third in four years, only the fifth time such an occurrence or better had occurred in League history. However, the Carlton team of his period is often neglected in discussions about the great VFL/AFL powerhouse teams, such as the Collingwood Machine that won four consecutive flags from 1927 to 1930, Norm Smith's Melbourne side which won five out of six flags from 1955 to 1960, and the Hawthorn juggernaut of the 1980s. In the foreword to Dan Eddy's book Larrikins & Legends, which was written to put forth a case for this Carlton team to be mentioned among the great VFL/AFL sides, premiership captain Mike Fitzpatrick commented that one reason this side was often overlooked could have been the lack of individual honours:

There were no Brownlows in this group in this time, no competition-leading goal kicker, no single player who dominated in all three Grand Finals. These were not teams of stars but teams of talented players who worked hard for each other.
Only 'Perc' Jones and 'Bomba' Sheldon became senior League coaches and it took 'Sellers' Maclure 20 years to break into mainstream media. So without a flag bearer, these great sides have been perpetually underrated.

In his introduction to the book, the author noted that the playing group's off-field antics could have been another reason the team was underrated:

...[I]n an era before full-time professionalism, those boys were as well known for their off-field deeds as their on-field exploits. They had a Rat Pack some 25 years before Collingwood made headlines for fostering a similar group of misfits.

Yet he concluded that the powerful ties forged through adversity, social bonding and playing for a common cause were what made this team great:

...[T]he key to greatness, to longevity as a powerhouse team, is mateship. No single ingredient was more vital to Carlton's success than the players' love for each other, a unique bond that endures to this day. Sure, there was the odd conflict, some players even came to blows [...], but it was the accountability by the senior players—again, on and off the field—that not only made Jezza, Perc and Parko's jobs easier, but that also ensured no player stepped out of line. [...] It was all inclusive, one-in all-in, and that, above all else, was why Carlton were great. They are football's forgotten champions.

The Norm Smith Medal was awarded to Richmond's Maurice Rioli. It was the first time that a player from the losing side had won the medal. It was also the third consecutive season that Rioli had been judged best afield in a Grand Final; he had won the West Australian Football League's equivalent medal, the Simpson Medal, in the 1980 and 1981 Grand Finals playing for South Fremantle. There were some Carlton supporters who felt that Wayne Johnston should have been awarded the medal instead, but neutral observers pointed out that Rioli had kept Richmond in the game with his three timely goals and bringing teammates into the game with his outstanding ball use. His relatively modest statistics for the match (18 kicks, one handpass and one mark) only tell part of the story; every time he was near the ball, Richmond players and fans would get excited, while Carlton opponents would sense imminent danger, especially when he tackled them.

By winning their 14th VFL premiership, the Blues overtook arch-rival Collingwood to become the new holder of the title of most successful VFL club. The previous team that had won successive VFL premierships was their match opponents Richmond, back in 1973 and 1974.

The fall-out at Richmond was swift and dramatic; by the end of the year, former club captains Raines and Cloke would be at Collingwood, sparking a bitter recruiting war between the two neighbouring arch-rivals which would plunge the Tigers into bankruptcy. Another former captain, Bryan Wood, ended up at Essendon. Francis Bourke's tough approach to fitness and discipline further alienated him from the playing group; and, by the end of 1983, in which Richmond crashed to 10th, he had resigned. Richmond would endure over three decades in the doldrums, punctuated by occasional finals appearances, until finally breaking their premiership drought in 2017.

== Scorecard ==
Grand Final
25 September 2:30 pm	Richmond	def. by	Carlton	MCG (crowd: 107,537)	Report
4.3 (27); 9.4 (58); 9.10 (64); 12.13 (85)	Q1; Q2; Q3; Final	4.7 (31); 6.11 (47); 11.15 (81); 14.19 (103)	Umpires: James, Sawers; Norm Smith Medal: Maurice Rioli; Television broadcast: Seven Network; National anthem: Rolf Harris
Bartlett, Cloke, Rioli 3 Raines, Jess, Weightman 1	Goals	2 Johnston, Fitzpatrick, Ashman, McConville; 1 Harmes, Hunter, Bosustow, Marcou, Maclure, Maylin
Rioli, Weightman, Raines, Strachan, Wiley	Best	Perovic, Johnston, Fitzpatrick, Marcou, Harmes, Hunter, Doull, English, Ashman
Tempany (forearm)	Injuries	Ditchburn (concussion), Fitzpatrick (ankle)
Landy (striking)	Reports	Jones (striking)
The win marked Carlton's 14th League premiership and the first time they had achieved back-to-back flags since 1915.; David Parkin won his third Jock McHale Medal.

== Bibliography ==
- Atkinson, Graeme; Atkinson, Brant (2009). The Complete Book of AFL Finals (4th ed.). The Five Mile Press. ISBN 9781742112756.
- Eddy, Dan (2017). Slattery, Geoff (ed.). Larrikins & Legends : the untold story of Carlton's greatest era. The Slattery Media Group. ISBN 9780987342829.
- Main, Jim (2006). When it matters most : the Norm Smith Medallist and best on ground in every Grand Final. Melbourne, Victoria: Bas Publishing. ISBN 1920910689.
- The Official statistical history of the AFL 2004
