= 1981 VFL grand final =

Grand final of the 1981 Victorian Football League season

1981 VFL Grand Final

Carlton	Collingwood
12.20 (92)	10.12 (72)
	1	2	3	4
CARL	2.4 (16)	5.8 (38)	8.13 (61)	12.20 (92)
COLL	2.6 (18)	5.7 (37)	10.10 (70)	10.12 (72)
- Date: 26 September 1981
- Stadium: Melbourne Cricket Ground, Melbourne, Australia
- Attendance: 112,964
- Favourite: Carlton

Broadcast in Australia
- Network: Seven Network
- Commentators: Peter Landy, Lou Richards, Bob Skilton

The 1981 VFL Grand Final was an Australian rules football game contested between the Carlton Football Club and Collingwood Football Club, held at the Melbourne Cricket Ground in Melbourne on 26 September 1981. It was the 85th annual Grand Final of the Victorian Football League, staged to determine the premiers for the 1981 VFL season. The match, attended by 112,964 spectators, was won by Carlton by a margin of 20 points, marking that club's 13th premiership victory. This match as of 2025 is the last one where these two great rivals clashed in a grand final.

== Background ==
It was a rematch of the two teams that competed in the 1979 Grand Final, which Carlton had won by just five points. Collingwood was searching for its first flag since winning the 1958 VFL Grand Final. They had appeared in three of the last four Grand Finals, losing them all.

At the conclusion of the home and away season, Carlton had finished first on the VFL ladder with 17 wins and 5 losses. Collingwood had finished second, also with 17 wins, but with an inferior percentage.

In the finals series leading up to the Grand Final, Collingwood was defeated by Geelong by 14 points in the Qualifying Final before defeating Fitzroy by 1 point in the First Semi-Final. They advanced to the Grand Final after beating Geelong by 7 points in the Preliminary Final. Carlton had a much easier finals run, defeating Geelong in the Second Semi-Final by 40 points to progress straight through to the Grand Final.

== Match summary ==
Captained by Mike Fitzpatrick, Carlton scored the last six goals of the game to emerge victorious. At one stage late in the third quarter Collingwood led by 21 points after a burst of five unanswered goals, before Carlton scored two late goals to go into three quarter time just 9 points behind.

Some infighting in the Collingwood huddle resulted in Carlton taking all the momentum into the last quarter. Ken Sheldon kicked the opening goal of the final quarter to get Carlton within four points and then Rod Ashman kicked one to put them in front. Collingwood laid down, scoring just two points in the quarter and goals from Mark Maclure and David McKay sealed the win for Carlton.

The Norm Smith Medal was awarded to Carlton's Bruce Doull for being judged the best player afield. Collingwood captain Peter Moore famously threw away his runner-up medal after this game in a show of disgust. This was his fourth appearance in a Grand Final, all without success.

This defeat gave Collingwood their third successive Grand Final loss and their fourth in five years. It was the final grand final loss of the infamous "Colliwobbles." They next appeared in a Grand Final nine years later, winning the 1990 AFL Grand Final. The win was Carlton's 13th premiership, drawing them level with Collingwood for the most premierships in VFL history—a record that Collingwood had held outright since 1929.

The grand final was the final one played with the old MCG scoreboard. It was given to Manuka Oval in 1982 after the MCG installed a new colour video scoreboard. The old scoreboard still resides at Manuka Oval today.

It was one of the last (if not the last) times the players swapped guernseys after the grand final (although not all players did.)

== Teams ==
Carlton	Collingwood

Carlton
B:	27 Des English	40 Scott Howell	15 Val Perovic
HB:	9 Ken Hunter	11 Bruce Doull	37 Wayne Harmes
C:	13 Phil Maylin	1 Greg Wells	32 David Glascott
HF:	4 Peter Bosustow	36 Mark Maclure	7 Wayne Johnston
F:	43 David McKay	33 Peter McConville	16 Jim Buckley
Foll:	3 Mike Fitzpatrick (c)	5 Ken Sheldon	14 Rod Ashman
Int:	34 Alex Marcou	6 Mario Bortolotto	
Coach:	David Parkin		

Collingwood
B:	10 Ian Cooper	6 Peter McCormack	26 Ray Byrne (dvc)
HB:	37 David Twomey	25 Billy Picken	33 Graeme Allan
C:	1 Ricky Barham	21 Mark Williams	7 Warwick Irwin
HF:	35 Peter Daicos	19 Craig Davis	36 Rene Kink
F:	23 Ray Shaw (vc)	20 Ross Brewer	9 Craig Stewart
Foll:	30 Peter Moore (c)	28 Michael Taylor	22 Tony Shaw
Int:	38 Stuart Atkin	54 Noel Lovell	
Coach:	Tom Hafey		

== Goal kickers ==
Carlton

- Ashman 3
- McKay 2
- Maclure 2
- Sheldon 2
- Buckley 1
- Harmes 1
- Johnston 1

Collingwood

- Barham 2
- Williams 2
- Daicos 1
- Moore 1
- R.Shaw 1
- T.Shaw 1
- Stewart 1
- Taylor 1

== See also ==
- 1981 VFL season
