= Noel Lovell =

Australian rules footballer

Personal information
- Full name: Noel Lovell
- Born: 26 September 1961 (age 65)
- Original team: Preston RSL
- Height: 178 cm (5 ft 10 in)
- Weight: 76 kg (168 lb)

Playing career^{1}
| Years | Club | Games (Goals) |
| 1981–1984 | Collingwood | 16 (6) |
| 1985–1986 | Richmond | 4 (0) |
| Total | | 20 (6) |
- ^{1} Playing statistics correct to the end of 1986.

Noel Lovell (born 26 September 1961) is a former Australian rules footballer who played with Collingwood and Richmond in the Victorian Football League (VFL) during the 1980s.

Lovell made his league debut in Collingwood's 1981 Preliminary Final win, coming off the interchange bench when Ross Brewer injured his ankle. This made him the first VFL player from any club since Len Thompson in 1965 to make his debut in a preliminary final. Recruited from Preston RSL, Lovell was again playing off the interchange bench in the 1981 VFL Grand Final and experienced his first loss.

He played the first seven rounds in 1982 but struggled to get a game over the next two seasons and finished his career with a stint at Richmond.
