= Russell Ohlsen =

Australian rules footballer

Personal information
- Full name: Russell John Ohlsen
- Born: 1 December 1955 (age 70)
- Original team: Maryborough (Ballarat FL)
- Debut: Round 9, 1975, Carlton vs. Richmond, at Princes Park
- Height: 183 cm (6 ft 0 in)
- Weight: 80 kg (176 lb)

Playing career^{1}
| Years | Club | Games (Goals) |
| 1975–1978 | Carlton | 47 (25) |
| 1979–1981 | Collingwood | 50 (22) |
| Total | | 97 (47) |
- ^{1} Playing statistics correct to the end of 1981.

Russell John Ohlsen (born 1 December 1955) is a former Australian rules footballer who played for Carlton and Collingwood in the VFL during the late 1970s and early 1980s.

A utility, Ohlsen was used mostly as a ruck-rover but could also tag opposition players. After a dispute with Carlton he successfully sought a clearance and crossed to Collingwood in 1979.

In Ohlsen's brief career at Collingwood he played in Collingwood's losing VFL Grand Finals in 1979 and 1980.

Ohlsen played under Ray Shaw in Preston's 1982 losing VFA grand final, then was a member of Preston's 1983 VFA premiership side. Ohlsen missed out on selection in Preston's 1984 VFA premiership through injury.

Olhsen later returned to Maryborough as their captain - coach.
