= Warren Jones (footballer) =

Australian rules footballer

Personal information
- Born: 2 November 1953 (age 73)
- Original teams: Morningside, Castlemaine
- Height: 200 cm (6 ft 7 in)
- Weight: 102 kg (225 lb)

Playing career^{1}
Years	Club	Games (Goals)
1978–1985	Carlton	92 (31)
1986–1988	St Kilda	31 (5)
Total		123 (36)
- ^{1} Playing statistics correct to the end of 1988.

Warren "Wow" Jones (born 2 November 1953) is a former Australian rules footballer who played with Carlton and St Kilda in the Victorian Football League (VFL).

New Zealand born Jones was a 200 cm ruckman and was recruited to Carlton from Morningside. For most of his time at Carlton he was their second choice ruckman with Mike Fitzpatrick being their first choice, meaning that Jones often started games on the bench including in their 1982 premiership team. He later suffered from a bout of glandular fever which stalled his career and in 1986 he crossed to St Kilda where he played for three more years.
