= Rod Austin =

Australian rules footballer and coach

Personal information
- Full name: Rodney Albert Austin
- Born: 26 January 1953 (age 73)
- Original team: Holy Child/St Dominic's
- Height: 180 cm (5 ft 11 in)
- Weight: 80 kg (176 lb)

Playing career^{1}
Years	Club	Games (Goals)
1972–1985	Carlton	220 (20)

Coaching career
Years	Club	Games (W–L–D)
1989–1990	Fitzroy	44 (19–25–0)
- ^{1} Playing statistics correct to the end of 1990.

Career highlights
- VFL Premiership player: 1979

Rodney Albert Austin (born 26 January 1953) is a former Australian rules footballer who played for the Carlton Football Club in the Victorian Football League (VFL).

Nicknamed "Curly" due to his mop of wavy black hair, Austin was a player with a distinctive unorthodox kicking style whose athleticism, intelligence and courage enabled him to be used in a variety of roles in defence, whether as a second full-back or on rovers resting in the forward pocket.

After retiring, Austin became a respected coach and AFL administrator.

== Career ==
In Round 14 of the 1977 VFL season, Carlton faced second-placed Hawthorn at Princes Park, needing a win to secure their place in the Top Five. Austin was given the formidable task of playing on Hawthorn champion Peter Hudson while Geoff Southby played further upfield. The Blues won a hard-fought game by 14 points, and Austin became only the third VFL player to keep Hudson goalless in a match. Reflecting on his achievement many years later, Austin recalled his relief at the result:

“I remember we won and it was an important game. I know he (Hudson) had a couple of shots for goal which he missed, thankfully, as it would have been a different story.”

Having already played on Hudson prior to this game, Austin knew what to expect and had devised his own strategy to counter the star full forward:

“I was aware of the fact that he used to sneak out the back door a bit, so it was more about me playing off him and getting the ball to ground. [...] You couldn’t get into a wrestling match with him (Hudson). You had to play off him a little bit and either get in front or spoil from behind. I used to play slightly behind his right shoulder and I was a left hander anyway. I tried to make a decision as the ball was coming of the boot of a Hawthorn player upfield, either to spoil or get in front of him. You look at players today and a lot of them get sucked into the ball, whereas I used my opponent as the starting point and then made a calculated choice based on who had the ball and where you thought it would go.”

He also praised his fellow defenders for helping him out:

“I needed a lot of help around me in the event I got caught in a one-on-one with him (Hudson). I needed blokes coming over the top to help with the spoil as well.”

Austin was part of the 1979 premiership side, but missed out in 1981 and 1982 due to injury.

== Coaching and Administration ==
After retiring, Austin started his coaching career at Footscray, taking the Reserves team to a premiership in 1988. He then succeeded David Parkin (who had been his last coach at Carlton) as senior coach at Fitzroy in 1989 and lifted the struggling Lions to sixth spot. At the end of that season, the VFL announced it was brokering a merger between Fitzroy and Footscray which was to be known as the Fitzroy Bulldogs, with Austin designated as head coach. However, football fans across Melbourne galvanized in a historic fundraising effort to clear Footscray's considerable debt, ensuring that the merger would not proceed.
The Lions were unable to build on their sixth-placed finish and dropped to 12th place in 1990, and Austin's contract was not renewed.

== Honours ==
Austin was inducted into the Carlton Hall of Fame in 1997.

On 16 January 2001, Austin was awarded the Australian Sports Medal for services to Australian Football.

Austin's son, Nick, worked as recruiting manager at the Western Bulldogs and then replaced Stephen Silvagni as head of list management at Carlton in January 2020.
