= Ian Sartori =

Australian rules footballer

Personal information
- Full name: Ian Francis Sartori
- Born: 17 December 1958 (age 67)
- Original team: Daylesford
- Height: 183 cm (6 ft 0 in)
- Weight: 78 kg (172 lb)
- Position: Half forward

Playing career^{1}
Years	Club	Games (Goals)
1978–81	St Kilda	47 (27)
1982–83, 1985	Richmond	18 (7)
Total		65 (34)
- ^{1} Playing statistics correct to the end of 1985.

Ian Sartori (born 17 December 1958) is a former Australian rules footballer who played with St Kilda and Richmond in the Victorian Football League (VFL).

Sartori, who was recruited from Daylesford, played his football mostly from the half forward flanks. After starting his career at St Kilda, Sartori crossed to Richmond in 1982 and was a member of their losing VFL Grand Final team, which played against Carlton.

Sartori was also a district cricketer, playing 123 first XI matches for North Melbourne (and North Melbourne-Geelong) from 1976/77 to 1989/90.
