= Peter Brown (Australian footballer, born 1958) =

Australian rules footballer

Personal information
- Born: 19 October 1958 (age 68)
- Original team: Campbell's Creek
- Debut: Round 12, 1976, Carlton vs. Collingwood, at Victoria Park
- Height: 184 cm (6 ft 0 in)
- Weight: 85 kg (187 lb)

Playing career^{1}
Years	Club	Games (Goals)
1976–1980	Carlton	35 (38)
1981–1982	St Kilda	20 (4)
Total		55 (42)
- ^{1} Playing statistics correct to the end of 1982.

Peter Brown (born 19 October 1958) is a former Australian rules footballer who played for Carlton and St Kilda in the Victorian Football League (VFL).

Brown started his career as a key forward and was at full-forward in Carlton's 1979 VFL Grand Final win over Collingwood. Brown sought a clearance from Carlton after the 1980 VFL season and joined St Kilda in 1981 with whom he would play mostly in defence.
