= 1979 VFL grand final =

Grand final of the 1979 Victorian Football League season

1979 VFL Grand Final

Carlton	Collingwood
11.16 (82)	11.11 (77)
	1	2	3	4
CARL	0.4 (4)	5.7 (37)	10.12 (72)	11.16 (82)
COLL	2.2 (14)	5.6 (36)	7.9 (51)	11.11 (77)
- Date: 29 September 1979
- Stadium: Melbourne Cricket Ground, Melbourne, Australia
- Attendance: 113,545
- Favourite: Carlton

Broadcast in Australia
- Network: Seven Network
- Commentators: Peter Landy, Lou Richards, Bob Skilton

The 1979 VFL Grand Final was an Australian rules football game contested between the Carlton Football Club and Collingwood Football Club, held at the Melbourne Cricket Ground in Melbourne on 29 September 1979. It was the 83rd annual Grand Final of the Victorian Football League, staged to determine the premiers for the 1979 VFL season. The match, attended by 113,545 spectators, was won by Carlton by a margin of 5 points, marking that club's 12th premiership victory.

== Background ==
This was the first Grand Final appearance by Carlton in six years since losing the 1973 VFL Grand Final. The last time the Blues had been premiers was when they won the 1972 VFL Grand Final against Richmond. Collingwood had last appeared in a Grand Final two years previously, when it was defeated by North Melbourne in the 1977 VFL Grand Final. The Magpies had last won a flag in 1958.

At the conclusion of the home and away season, Carlton had finished first on the VFL ladder with 19 wins and 3 losses. Collingwood had finished third (behind North Melbourne) with 15 wins and 7 losses.

In the finals series leading up to the Grand Final, Collingwood lost to North Melbourne in the Qualifying Final by 39 points before beating Fitzroy in the First Semi-Final by 22 points to progress to the Preliminary Final. There they faced North Melbourne again, this time winning by 27 points to advance to the Grand Final. Carlton had a much easier finals run, defeating North Melbourne by 38 points in the Second Semi-Final to advance straight through to the Grand Final.

In the week leading up to the Grand Final, Collingwood ruckman Peter Moore was awarded the Brownlow Medal.

== Match summary ==
The game was played in rainy and muddy conditions. Collingwood planned to grind Carlton into the mud, and they managed to take a 10-point lead into quarter time, keeping Carlton goalless. Twenty minutes into the second quarter, Collingwood had stretched their lead to 28 points. Carlton still hadn't scored a goal, and with the conditions only getting heavier, things were looking promising for the Magpies. Seemingly in desperation, Alex Jesaulenko moved himself out of the centre and brought in young pocket battleship Wayne Harmes. Suddenly, Carlton sparked into life, as goals to Harmes, Mark Maclure, Wayne Johnston and Jim Buckley saw the Blues grab the lead at half-time by one point. Carlton capitalized on their momentum, scoring five goals to two and taking a 21-point lead at three-quarter time. However, 18 minutes into the final quarter, the Blues' lead had been slashed to four points, with the Magpies having kicked the last three goals of the game.

Team	1	2	3	Final
Carlton	0.4 (4)	5.7 (37)	10.12 (72)	11.16 (82)
Collingwood	2.2 (14)	5.6 (36)	7.9 (51)	11.11 (77)

Then occurred one of the most memorable moments in VFL/AFL history. With Carlton kicking to the City End, Harmes gathered the ball on the half-forward flank and hurried a kick forward. The kick floated into the right forward pocket, with no player from either team in the vicinity. Harmes chased his own kick as the ball bounced towards the boundary line, and he dived to punch the ball back into play before the ball went over the line. Harmes' punch directed the ball into the goal square, where Ken Sheldon, who was running forward at the time, was able to gather the ball and score a goal, giving Carlton a ten-point buffer. Many Collingwood fans maintain to this day that the ball was out of bounds before Harmes punched it back in. The incident was one of the first two recreated for the Toyota Memorable Moments series of advertisements. Football historian Rhett Bartlett discovered new footage in 2023 that appears to clearly show that Harmes was able to keep the ball in play.

A successful left-foot snap by Collingwood centre half-forward Allan Edwards lifted the hopes of the Magpie army, but from the resultant bounce Carlton managed to move the ball forward where substitute Alex Marcou scored a point. Moments later, the siren sounded.

The inaugural Norm Smith Medal was awarded to Harmes for being judged the best player afield, much to the chagrin of Collingwood supporters who were still ranting about that goal, as well as the fact that Harmes was a grand-nephew of Norm Smith. However, it was Harmes who helped spark the second-quarter comeback when all seemed lost for Carlton.

Carlton's Alex Jesaulenko became the last-ever player to captain-coach a team to victory in a Grand Final. During the final quarter, he injured his ankle and had to leave the field on a stretcher.

== Teams ==
Carlton	Collingwood

Carlton
B:	37 Wayne Harmes	20 Geoff Southby	43 David McKay
HB:	22 Robbert Klomp	11 Bruce Doull	33 Peter McConville
C:	47 Peter Francis	25 Alex Jesaulenko (c)	19 Michael Young
HF:	7 Wayne Johnston	36 Mark Maclure	8 Trevor Keogh
F:	3 Mike Fitzpatrick	41 Peter Brown	5 Ken Sheldon
Foll:	28 Peter Jones (vc)	12 Barry Armstrong	16 Jim Buckley
Int:	21 Rod Austin	34 Alex Marcou	
Coach:	Alex Jesaulenko		

Collingwood
B:	3 Stan Magro	6 Peter McCormack	27 Kevin Worthington
HB:	26 Ray Byrne	25 Billy Picken	24 Andrew Ireland
C:	43 Ricky Barham	14 Kevin Morris (vc)	21 Graeme Anderson
HF:	36 Rene Kink (dvc)	8 Allan Edwards	20 Ross Brewer
F:	4 Derek Shaw	19 Craig Davis	23 Ray Shaw (c)
Foll:	30 Peter Moore	34 Russell Ohlsen	5 Ronald Wearmouth
Int:	12 Denis Banks	29 Leigh Carlson	
Coach:	Tom Hafey		

== Match stats ==
Goals Carlton: Sheldon 3, Buckley 2, Maclure 2, Francis, Harmes, Jones, Young
Goals Collingwood: Davis 4, Brewer, Carlson, Edwards, Ireland, Kink, Ohlsen, Wearmouth

Best Carlton: Harmes, Francis, Johnston, Buckley, Klomp, Armstrong
Best Collingwood: Picken, Morris, Byrne, Davis, Barham, Ohlsen

Umpires: Bill Deller, Kevin Smith

== See also ==
- 1979 VFL season

== Sources ==
- The Official statistical history of the AFL 2004
