= Bruce Tempany =

Australian rules footballer

Personal information
- Full name: Bruce Tempany
- Born: 22 December 1958 (age 67); Malvern East, Victoria
- Original team: Essex Heights (SFL)
- Height: 189 cm (6 ft 2 in)
- Weight: 85 kg (187 lb)
- Position: Defender

Playing career^{1}
Years	Club	Games (Goals)
1977–83	Richmond	87 (33)
- ^{1} Playing statistics correct to the end of 1983.

Bruce Tempany (born 22 December 1958) is a former Australian rules footballer who played with Richmond in the Victorian Football League (VFL).

Recruited from Essex Heights in the Southern Football League (SFL), Tempany made his VFL debut in 1977, playing mostly as a half back flanker. Described as one of the most dedicated trainers at Richmond "and when fully fit was a player with great drive".

He appeared in 40 of a possible 44 games in the 1978 and 1979 VFL seasons, before a succession of injuries curtailed his career. He played finals football for the first time in 1980 but injury kept him out of the 1980 VFL Grand Final and, after starting on the interchange bench, broke his arm during the 1982 VFL Grand Final.

Tempany developed a severe asthmatic condition in 1982 which forced him to retire near the end of the 1984 VFL season.
