= Adam Saad =

Australian rules footballer (born 1994)

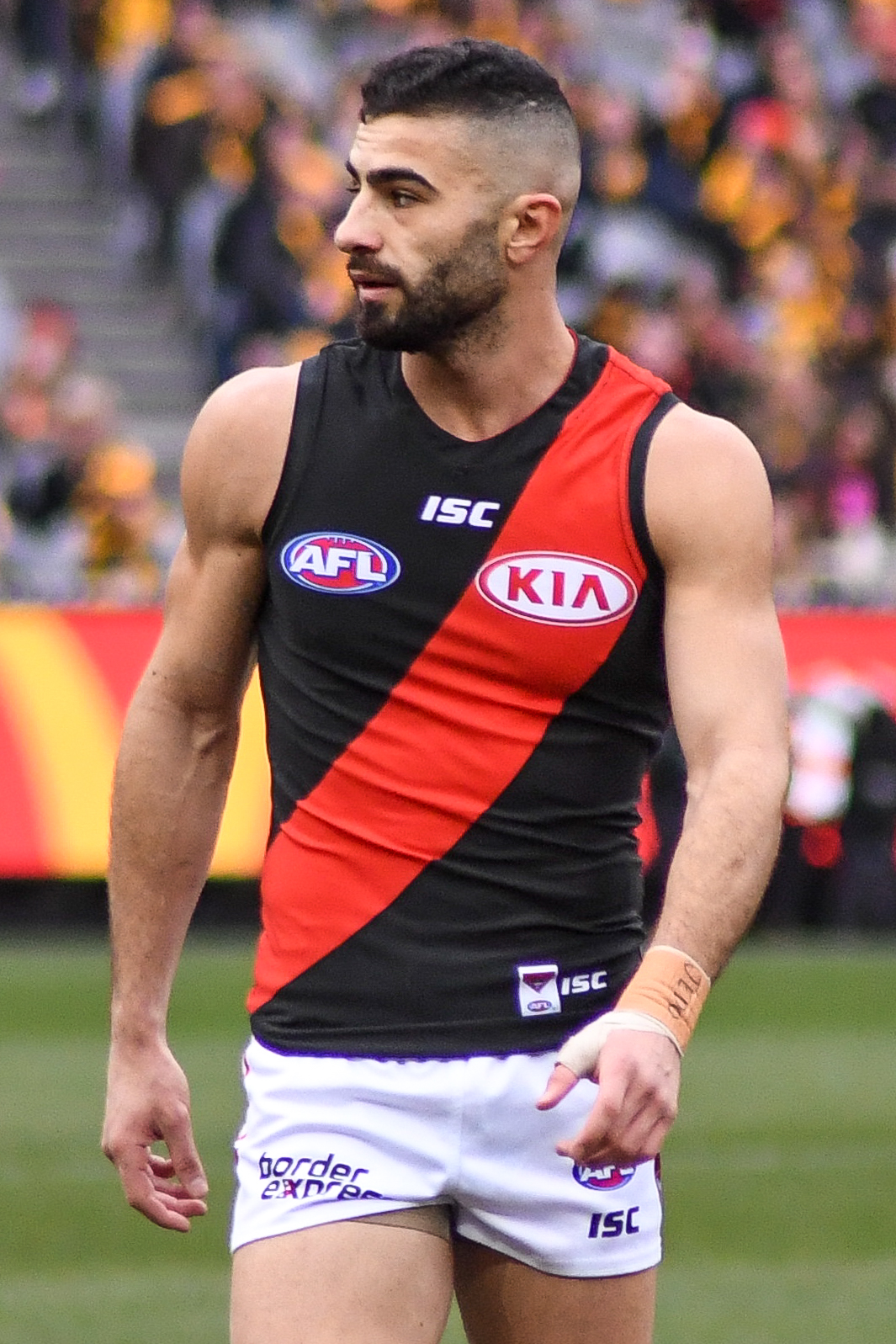
- Saad playing for Essendon in August 2018

Personal information
- Full name: Adam Saad
- Born: 23 July 1994 (age 32)
- Original team: Coburg (VFL)
- Draft: No. 25, 2015 rookie draft
- Height: 178 cm (5 ft 10 in)
- Weight: 76 kg (168 lb)
- Position: Defender

Club information
- Current club: Carlton
- Number: 42

Playing career^{1}
Years	Club	Games (Goals)
2015–2017	Gold Coast	48 (3)
2018–2020	Essendon	61 (5)
2021–2026	Carlton	110 (4)
Total		219 (12)

Representative team honours
Years	Team	Games (Goals)
2020	Victoria	1 (0)
- ^{1} Playing statistics correct to the end of 2026.

Career highlights
- All-Australian team (2022); 22under22 team (2015); AFL Rising Star nominee (2015)

Adam Saad (born 23 July 1994) is an Australian rules footballer currently playing for the Carlton Football Club in the Australian Football League. He previously played for the Gold Coast Suns and the Essendon Football Club.

== Early career ==
As a junior, Saad first played for West Coburg Football Club in the Essendon District Football League. He was part of the club's under-18s premiership in 2010, where he was coached by Phil Cleary.

Saad joined Coburg in 2013 following a TAC Cup stint with the Calder Cannons. After appearing to struggle between Senior and Development level football, he established himself as one of the VFL's leading small defenders, winning the Coburg best and fairest award in 2014 sharing in a tie with Daniel Venditti, and was named in the 2014 VFL Team of the Year. His strong form and State Combine testing led him to being drafted to the Gold Coast Suns with pick 25 in the 2015 rookie draft.

== AFL career ==
=== Gold Coast ===
Saad made his debut for the Gold Coast Suns in round 1 of the 2015 season and kicked one goal in a defeat to Melbourne. In round 5, 2015, Saad was nominated for the Rising Star after his team's win over the Brisbane Lions where he had 26 touches.

Following the 2017 season, Saad requested and was granted a trade to Essendon, who sent their 2018 second round draft pick to the Gold Coast in return.

=== Essendon ===
Following his impressive first two seasons, in which he placed fourth and third in the Crichton Medal, Saad and Essendon opened contract talks on the eve of the 2020 season about a long-term extension, with a four-year deal expected to be agreed in the short term. However, after round 1 of the season, the league was forced to shut itself down indefinitely due to the COVID-19 pandemic, with the AFL placing an indefinite embargo on any new player contracts as it sought to come to terms with the financial ramifications of the situation. The AFL resumed its season in early June, but did not lift the contract embargo until mid-July. Essendon struggled for form during this period, and by the time the contract embargo had been lifted, Saad was less sure about re-signing with the Bombers than he had been in March.

At the end of the season, Saad shocked Essendon by requesting a trade to their fierce rivals, Carlton, only three years after seeking out Essendon to recruit him.

=== Carlton ===
Saad kicked his first goal for Carlton in the Blues' round 7, 2021 win against his old side Essendon.

Saad was selected as a 2022 All-Australian.

Through his career, Saad has been known for his dashing pace, and propensity to run long distances with the ball, frequently bouncing it. He led the league in bounces in 2017, 2018, 2021 and 2022; in both 2018 and 2022, his tally of bounces more than doubled his nearest rival. As of 2024, he holds the record for highest average running bounces per game since statistics were first recorded in 1999, with 3.46 per game. He has a long left-foot kick, and during his time at Carlton, the spectators would shout "woof!" whenever he took a kick; he was the fifth long-kicking left footed Carlton player to receive this traditional treatment, which had originated with Val Perovic in the 1980s.

Saad departed Carlton at the end of the 2026 AFL season.

== Personal life ==
Saad is a practising Muslim. He is of Lebanese descent.

== Statistics ==
Updated to the end of round 22, 2026.

Legend
G	Goals	K	Kicks	D	Disposals	T	Tackles
B	Behinds	H	Handballs	M	Marks

Season	Team	No.	Games	Totals							Averages (per game)							Votes
Season	Team	No.	Games	G	B	K	H	D	M	T	G	B	K	H	D	M	T	Votes
2015	Gold Coast	42	16	1	2	121	151	272	66	44	0.1	0.1	7.6	9.4	17.0	4.1	2.8	3
2016	Gold Coast	42	10	0	2	75	76	151	36	25	0.0	0.2	7.5	7.6	15.1	3.6	2.5	0
2017	Gold Coast	42	22	2	7	194	171	365	78	50	0.1	0.3	8.8	7.8	16.6	3.5	2.3	1
2018	Essendon	42	22	0	3	199	178	377	56	55	0.0	0.1	9.0	8.1	17.1	2.5	2.5	3
2019	Essendon	42	22	3	0	239	149	388	62	75	0.1	0.0	10.9	6.8	17.6	2.8	3.4	0
2020 (Note: The 2020 season was played with 17 home-and-away matches per team (down from 22) and 16-minute quarters with time on (down from 20-minute quarters with time on) due to the impact of the COVID-19 pandemic.)	Essendon	42	17	2	1	201	119	320	49	34	0.1	0.1	11.8	7.0	18.8	2.9	2.0	2
2021	Carlton	42	22	2	6	311	113	424	72	39	0.1	0.3	14.1	5.1	19.3	3.3	1.8	0
2022	Carlton	42	21	0	0	323	136	459	100	47	0.0	0.0	15.4	6.5	21.9	4.8	2.2	3
2023	Carlton	42	25	0	0	341	161	502	111	48	0.0	0.0	13.6	6.4	20.1	4.4	1.9	3
2024	Carlton	42	18	1	1	217	113	330	70	40	0.1	0.1	12.1	6.3	18.3	3.9	2.2	0
2025	Carlton	42	21	1	1	264	114	378	61	53	0.0	0.0	12.6	5.4	18.0	2.9	2.5	0
2026	Carlton	42	3	0	0	27	16	43	7	4	0.0	0.0	9.0	5.3	14.3	2.3	1.3	0
Career			219	12	23	2512	1497	4009	768	514	0.1	0.1	11.5	6.8	18.3	3.5	2.3	15
