= Ian Brewer =

Australian rules footballer (1936–2010)

Personal information
- Full name: Ian Davidson Brewer
- Born: 15 June 1936
- Died: 15 April 2010 (aged 73)
- Original team: Sale
- Height: 188 cm (6 ft 2 in)
- Weight: 89 kg (196 lb)

Playing career^{1}
Years	Club	Games (Goals)
1956–1961	Collingwood	84 (164)
1962	St Kilda	0 (0)
1963–1964	Claremont	43 (105)
1965–66, 1970	Norwood	44 (179)
Total		171 (448)
- ^{1} Playing statistics correct to the end of 1970.

Ian Davidson Brewer (15 June 1936 – 15 April 2010) was an Australian rules footballer from 1956 to 1970, in the three major leagues of his era: the Victorian Football League (VFL), West Australian National Football League (WANFL) and South Australian National Football League (SANFL). Brewer played a combined total of 171 senior games for Collingwood, Claremont and Norwood.

A key forward from Sale, Brewer played with Collingwood from 1956 to 1961. He kicked 73 goals in 1958, which earned him the Coleman Medal. This tally included six goals in the Queen's Birthday clash against Melbourne, in front of a record crowd of 99,346. Brewer was a member of the Magpies' premiership team that year.

After spending the 1962 season with St Kilda, where he was unable to break into a strong senior team, Brewer moved to Perth and joined Claremont. In 1964, he was a key factor in the Tigers' rags to riches premiership.

Brewer transferred to Norwood in 1965, topping the SANFL goal-kicking records that same year.

Between stints at Norwood, Brewer was captain-coach of Wangaratta Rovers in the Ovens & Murray Football League.

His younger brother Ross also played in the VFL.
