= Mike Fitzpatrick (footballer) =

Personal information
- Full name: Michael Clifford Fitzpatrick
- Born: 28 January 1953 (age 73); Hastings, Victoria, Australia
- Height: 192 cm (6 ft 4 in)
- Weight: 98 kg (216 lb)
- Position: Ruck

Playing career
Years	Club	Games (Goals)
1970–1974	Subiaco	97 (77)
1975–1983	Carlton	150 (150)
Total		247 (227)

Representative team honours
Years	Team	Games (Goals)
1972–1982	Western Australia	11 (7)
?	Victoria	2 (?)

Career highlights
- 3 × vfl Premiership player: 1979, 1981, 1982; AFL Premiership captain: 1981, 1982; John Nicholls Medal: 1979; WAFL Premiership player 1973; Subiaco Best & Fairest 1973, 1974

Michael Clifford Fitzpatrick AO (born 28 January 1953) is an Australian businessman, sporting administrator and former professional Australian rules football player. He was chairman of the AFL Commission (football's governing body) from 2007 to 2017.

Fitzpatrick was raised in Perth and began his football career with Subiaco in the West Australian Football League (WAFL). A ruckman, he played 97 games for the club between 1970 and 1974, playing in a premiership team in 1973 and winning the club's best and fairest award in his last two seasons. Fitzpatrick transferred to the Victorian Football League (VFL) for the 1975 season and represented Carlton until his retirement at the end of the 1983 season. He played in premierships in 1979, 1981, and 1982, and captained the club from 1980 to 1983. Fitzpatrick also represented both Western Australia and Victoria in interstate matches.

A graduate of the University of Western Australia, Fitzpatrick interrupted his football career to study at St. John's College, Oxford, on a Rhodes Scholarship. After retiring from football he worked for the Victorian Treasury Department, and later worked in investment banking and funds management. Outside his commercial interests, Fitzpatrick served on the board of the Carlton Football Club from 1989 to 1995, and as chairman of the Australian Sports Commission from 1994 to 1997.

== Early life and football career ==
Fitzpatrick was born in Hastings, Victoria, but moved to Perth, Western Australia, at a young age. He attended Churchlands Senior High School from 1966 to 1970 (including as head boy in his last year), and went on to study at the University of Western Australia, graduating with a Bachelor of Engineering degree in 1975.

=== Subiaco ===
Fitzpatrick made his senior debut for Subiaco during the 1970 WANFL season, aged 17. He was 191 centimetres (6 ft 3 in) tall and 96 kilograms (212 lb) at his peak, and played as a ruckman. During the 1973 season, Fitzpatrick represented Subiaco at the Championship of Australia, played in the grand final victory over West Perth (the club's first premiership since 1924), and was awarded the Outridge Medal as the club's best and fairest player. He won a second Outridge Medal in 1974, in both years finishing just ahead of Peter Featherby. In total, Fitzpatrick played 97 games in his five seasons at Subiaco, kicking 77 goals.

=== Carlton ===
Having been targeted by Victorian recruiters for several years, Fitzpatrick transferred to Carlton for the 1975 VFL season. He played in all 24 of his team's matches and kicked 27 goals, including five against Collingwood in just his second game. He finished equal eleventh in the Brownlow Medal, polling eleven votes. After the end of the season, Fitzpatrick moved to England to study at St. John's College, Oxford, having been named Western Australia's 1975 Rhodes Scholar. He returned to Australia during the 1976 English summer and managed twelve further games for Carlton, but in 1977 did not play at all. After graduating from Oxford with a Bachelor of Arts in Philosophy, Politics and Economics, Fitzpatrick resumed his football midway through the 1978 season, although he had time for only two games that year.

During the 1979 season, Fitzpatrick played every match for Carlton and kicked 36 goals, including four each in games against Geelong and Hawthorn. He recorded 13 disposals, five marks, and 18 hit-outs in the grand final victory over Collingwood, and at the end of the season was awarded the Robert Reynolds Trophy as Carlton's best and fairest player. Prior to the 1980 season, Fitzpatrick was appointed club captain in place of Peter Jones, who retired from playing in order to become head coach. The club lost consecutive finals in 1980, but subsequently won two premierships in two years, something they had not done since 1914/1915. Fitzpatrick was runner-up to Bruce Doull in the 1981 Norm Smith Medal and kicked two goals in the 1982 Grand Final. He missed several matches due to injury in 1983, and announced his retirement at the end of the season in order to concentrate on his business career.

=== Interstate matches ===
Fitzpatrick made his state debut for Western Australia at the 1972 Perth Carnival, aged 19, as a reserve for Bob Beecroft against Tasmania. He played his first full matches the following season, against Victoria at VFL Park and against South Australia at Subiaco Oval. He also played two state games in 1974, one of which was a narrow seven-point loss to Victoria in which he kicked two goals. After moving to the VFL in 1975, Fitzpatrick's appearances for Western Australia became less frequent. He returned to the state team for the 1979 Perth State of Origin Carnival (after five years' absence), and made an additional five appearances over the next three years. In total, he played eleven matches for Western Australia between 1972 and 1982, kicking seven goals. Fitzpatrick was also eligible to represent Victoria in some matches where state of origin rules had not yet been fully implemented. He played two interstate games for Victoria, including one as captain in 1982.

== Business career ==
At the end of the 1983 season Fitzpatrick retired from football and began working as an adviser in the John Cain government's Victorian Treasury Department. His career then took him to New York where he worked for international investment banks Merrill Lynch and Credit Suisse First Boston.

In 1994, he set up Hastings Funds Management, a successful superannuations funds company of which 51 per cent was sold to the Westpac in 2002.

Positions held were:

- director of Rio Tinto.
- director of Telstra, Australian Infrastructure Fund Limited and Pacific Hydro.
- chairman of the Australian Sports Commission.
- chairman of the Victorian Funds Management Corporation and Treasury Group Ltd.
- director of several of Hastings' managed investments.

In 1996, Fitzpatrick bought a vineyard in Victoria's Yarra Valley, which he named 'Squitchy Lane' (after Squitchey Lane in Oxford, where he lived as a student and first became interested in wine).

== AFL Commission ==
Fitzpatrick was appointed to the AFL Commission in 2003, and in 2007 replaced Ron Evans as its chairman. He retired from the position of chairman in April 2017 and was replaced by Richard Goyder.

He was criticised for not being quick enough to condemn booing of Sydney Swans player Adam Goodes.

== Community ==
Fitzpatrick has served as a trustee of the Rhodes Trust since 2018.

== Honours ==
Fitzpatrick was named in the Teams of the Century for both Subiaco and Carlton, including as captain of Subiaco. He was an inaugural inductee into the West Australian Football Hall of Fame in 2004. In 2011, the University of Western Australia awarded Fitzpatrick an honorary degree, as Doctor of Letters.
