= Glenn James =

Australian rules football umpire

Personal information
- Full name: Glenn Robert James
- Other occupation: Teacher

Umpiring career
Years	League	Role	Games
1977–1985	VFL	Field umpire	166

Glenn Robert James is a former Australian rules football umpire in the Victorian Football League. James umpired the 1982 and 1984 VFL Grand Finals and is recognised as the only Indigenous Australian to umpire VFL or AFL football.

== Early life ==
James was the tenth child in a family of 14. His father, an Indigenous Australian of the Yorta Yorta people, worked in the Ardmona Cannery in Shepparton. The young James attended school at Gowrie Street School in Shepparton.

In 1968, James was drafted into the Australian Army and spent a year in Vietnam during the Vietnam War. James is one of two VFL umpires to have served in Vietnam, the other being goal umpire Trevor Pescud.

== Football career ==
=== Playing career ===
With his brothers, James played for Wunghnu in the Picola & District Football League. After a broken jaw ended his playing career, James turned to umpiring.

=== Umpiring career ===
After starting his umpiring career in country football, James umpired 166 VFL matches between 1977 and 1985, including the 1982 and 1984 VFL Grand Finals, and was the umpire selected in the Indigenous Team of the Century.

As an umpire, James faced abuse from spectators on the basis of his racial background. In 1978, as a result of the nature of the abuse of James, lawyer Greg Lyons studied the legality of this abuse.

In 1985, James was President of the Victorian Football League Umpires Association.

James has the distinction of umpiring an VFL exhibition match for Richmond vs. Carlton at the 1982 Commonwealth Games, the only time Australian rules football has been exhibited at the Commonwealth Games.

== Post-football career ==
=== Umpire coach ===
Immediately after retiring from VFL umpiring, James was appointed in 1986 as Umpiring Careers Advisor with the Victorian Country Football League.

Between 1994 and 1996, James was AFL Assistant Umpires Coach.

=== Teaching ===
He has a Bachelor of Education degree as well as a Diploma of Technical Teaching. James was a lecturer at Swinburne University for many years. Glenn James taught graphic arts at Box Hill Technical College from the 1970s–1980s.

James currently works for the Worawa Aboriginal College as a student ambassador, providing support for Aboriginal students.

=== Media ===
James commentates AFL matches for the National Indigenous Radio Service. He also is a panellist for The Marngrook Footy Show on NITV.

=== Music ===
In 2008, James—with former umpires Peter Cameron, John Sutcliffe and Andrew Coates, as well as then-current AFL umpires Scott McLaren, Mathew James and Ray Chamberlain—recorded a song entitled "The Man In White".

=== Koori Court ===
As of 2008, James worked for the Koori Court in Melbourne as a cultural advisor.

== Honours ==
- Victorian Aborigine of the Year: 1984
- Life Member of the Victorian Football League Umpires Association: 1984
- Medal of the Order of Australia: 1987
