= Ian Cooper (Australian footballer, born 1954) =

Australian rules footballer

Personal information
- Full name: Ian D. Cooper
- Born: 12 June 1954 (age 72)
- Original team: East Reservoir
- Height: 183 cm (6 ft 0 in)
- Weight: 81 kg (179 lb)
1972–1983	Collingwood	93 (0)
1984-1987	Port Melbourne	40 (68)

Ian D. Cooper (born 12 June 1954) is a former Australian rules footballer who played with Collingwood in the Victorian Football League (VFL).

From East Reservoir, Cooper came to Collingwood as a forward but was used as a back pocket defender during his time in the VFL. He played his first game in 1972 but didn't establish a place in the team until 1974, keeping Peter Hudson goal-less in Round 2 of 1974, and was a regular until 1977. Injuries restricted him to just 14 games in his final four seasons. He was however, despite having played just three times all year, selected in the 1981 VFL Grand Final.

Cooper finished his career in the VFA with Port Melbourne.
