= 1983 Brownlow Medal =

- Winner: Ross Glendinning (North Melbourne); 24 votes

Television/radio coverage
- Network: Seven Network

The 1983 Brownlow Medal was the 56th year the award was presented to the player adjudged the fairest and best player during the Victorian Football League (VFL) home and away season. Ross Glendinning of the North Melbourne Football Club won the medal by polling twenty-four votes during the 1983 VFL season.

== Leading votegetters ==
	Player	Votes
1st	Ross Glendinning (North Melbourne)	24
2nd	Maurice Rioli (Richmond)	23
3rd	Simon Madden (Essendon)	22
4th	Gary Dempsey (North Melbourne)	17
5th	Mark Lee (Richmond)	16
=6th	Terry Daniher (Essendon)	15
=6th	Terry Wallace (Hawthorn)	15
8th	Val Perovic (Carlton)	14
=9th	Jim Edmond (Footscray)	13
=9th	Andrew Purser (Footscray)	13
=9th	Steven Icke (Melbourne)	13
