= Graeme Landy =

Australian rules footballer

Personal information
- Born: 31 May 1954 (age 72)
- Original team: Echuca
- Height: 183 cm (6 ft 0 in)
- Weight: 84.5 kg (186 lb)

Playing career^{1}
Years	Club	Games (Goals)
1975–1978	Geelong	41 (30)
1979–1986	Richmond	120 (38)
1987–1988	Geelong	13 (1)
Total		174 (69)
- ^{1} Playing statistics correct to the end of 1988.

Career highlights
- Geelong - Reserves Premiership Player 1975

Graeme Landy (born 31 May 1954) is a former Australian rules football player who played in the VFL between 1975 and 1978 for the Geelong Football Club, from 1979 until 1986 for the Richmond Football Club and finally in 1987 and 1988 back at Geelong.
