= Spiro Kourkoumelis =

Australian rules footballer

Personal information
- Full name: Spiro Kourkoumelis
- Born: 31 July 1963 (age 63)
- Original team: Princes Hill
- Height: 183 cm (6 ft 0 in)
- Weight: 82.5 kg (182 lb)
- Position: Midfielder

Playing career^{1}
Years	Club	Games (Goals)
1981–1986	Carlton	62 (56)
1987–1990	St Kilda	35 (15)
Total		97 (71)
- ^{1} Playing statistics correct to the end of 1990.

Spiro Kourkoumelis (born 31 July 1963) is a former Australian rules footballer who played with Carlton and St Kilda in the Victorian Football League (VFL). After leaving St Kilda, he played for Coburg in the Victorian Football Association (VFA). He attended Princes Hill Secondary College in Carlton North. He is currently proprietor of Avanti Cycles on Sydney Road, Brunswick.
