= Ross Ditchburn =

Australian rules footballer

Personal information
- Full name: Ross William Ditchburn
- Nickname: The Farmer
- Born: 18 March 1957 (age 69)
- Original team: Claremont (WAFL)
- Draft: No. 12, 1981 interstate draft
- Debut: Round 8, 1982, Carlton vs. Footscray, at Western Oval
- Height: 192 cm (6 ft 4 in)
- Weight: 92 kg (203 lb)

Playing career^{1}
Years	Club	Games (Goals)
1975–1980	Claremont	110 (214)
1982–1983	Carlton	28 (91)
Total		138 (305)
- ^{1} Playing statistics correct to the end of 1983.

Career highlights
- 1982 Best First Year Player Award; 1982 Carlton Football Club leading goalkicker; 1982 VFL Premiership player

Ross William Ditchburn (born 18 March 1957) is a former Australian rules footballer in the Western Australian National Football League and the Victorian Football League.

From a prominent farming family in the small Western Australian wheatbelt community of Kukerin, Ditchburn moved to Perth in the mid-1970s, where he played WANFL football for Claremont. Between 1975 and 1980, Ditchburn played a total of 110 senior games for Claremont as a forward. He left the league at the end of 1980, and returned to work at the family farm in Kukerin. During the 1981 season, he served as captain-coach of the Kukerin Football Club in the Central Great Southern Football League.

Ditchburn had been signed by the VFL's Carlton Football Club during the 1970s, tying him to the club if he ever chose to move to Victoria. At age 25 he decided he needed to make the attempt at VFL football in 1982 before he became too old to have a reasonable chance at it. He initially struggled; by Round 14, he had played only one senior game for one goal, and was considered too slow to play his preferred position of centre half forward in the VFL. He was nearly cleared back to Western Australia at mid-season, but was instead moved to full-forward where he had much greater success. In Round 16, his third senior VFL game, he kicked twelve goals from full-forward, and was able to cement a regular place in the team for the rest of the season. He kicked a total of 61 goals in only thirteen senior games for the year to be Carlton's leading goalkicker, and he was a member of the club's 1982 VFL Grand Final winning side having been knocked unconscious during the game. He played one further season for the Blues, kicking 30 goals in 15 games, to finish his brief VFL career with 28 games and 91 goals.

Ditchburn returned to Kukerin after the 1983 season, in large part because his father was becoming ill, and he resumed his place on the family farm where he has continued to work since. He also continued to play football for Kukerin and post-merger club Kukerin-Dumbleyung for many years. He became heavily involved in the local community later in his life as a Shire of Dumbleyung councillor and deputy president.
