= Leigh Carlson =

Australian rules footballer

Personal information
- Born: 15 January 1958 (age 68)
- Original team: Preston (VFA)
- Height: 178 cm (5 ft 10 in)
- Weight: 76 kg (168 lb)

Playing career^{1}
Years	Club	Games (Goals)
1975-1978, 1986	Preston	44 (114)
1978–1981	Collingwood	42 (32)
1981–1984	Fitzroy	75 (48)
Total		161 (194)
- ^{1} Playing statistics correct to the end of 1984.

Leigh Carlson (born 15 January 1958) is a former Australian rules footballer who played for Collingwood and Fitzroy in the VFL.

== Career ==
Carlson started and ended his career at Victorian Football Association club Preston, but in between played seven seasons in the VFL. His first stop was Collingwood where he was used mainly on the wing and as a rover. He played in their losing 1979 and 1980 Grand Final sides and during the 1981 season crossed to Fitzroy.

In a rare period of success for Fitzroy he contested the finals with the club in 1981, 1983 and 1984.
