= Robbert Klomp =

Australian rules footballer

Personal information
- Full name: Robbert Jan Klomp
- Nickname: Clippity
- Born: 14 May 1955 (age 71); Heerenveen, Netherlands
- Original team: Heathfield-Aldgate United
- Height: 183 cm (6 ft 0 in)
- Weight: 89 kg (196 lb)
- Position: Defender

Playing career^{1}
Years	Club	Games (Goals)
1973–78, 1985-87	Sturt	205 (173)
1979–83	Carlton	84 (17)
1983–84	Footscray	9 (3)
Total		298 (193)

Representative team honours
Years	Team	Games (Goals)
1977–??	South Australia	7
- ^{1} Playing statistics correct to the end of 1985.

Career highlights
- Sturt premiership player, 1974, 1976; Carlton premiership player, 1979, 1982

Robbert Klomp (born 14 May 1955) is a former Australian rules footballer who played with Sturt in the South Australian National Football League (SANFL), and with Carlton and Footscray in the Victorian Football League (VFL).

Klomp was born in the Netherlands and raised in South Australia. He began playing for Sturt in 1973 and was a key contributor to their premierships in 1974 and 1976.

He was one of the best players on the ground in the 1976 SANFL Grand Final, kicking 2 goals from centre half-forward and creating several more for his teammates with clever handpasses.

Klomp was signed by VFL club Carlton during the summer of 1978/79 and made an immediate impact in his first season with the Blues on the half-back flank. He played every game of Carlton's 1979 premiership season, finishing equal 7th in the Brownlow Medal with 13 votes and accumulating 20 possessions in both finals while minding dangerous opponents Russell Ebert and Rene Kink.

He suffered a severe hamstring injury midway through the 1981 season and had to watch Carlton's victorious Grand Final from the sidelines. But he returned the following year to play all but one game of Carlton's 1982 premiership season and was an integral member of the league's stingiest defence.

A recurrence of hamstring injuries curtailed Klomp's VFL career. After 84 games at Carlton, he transferred to Footscray in June 1983, where he managed to play just 9 games in his two seasons there.

He returned to Adelaide in 1985, where he played another three years with Sturt and retired at the end of the 1987 season after 205 games in the SANFL.

During his career, he also played seven State of Origin games for South Australia.

Klomp's brother Kim played for SANFL clubs Sturt and North Adelaide.

After his playing career, he served as a boundary rider.

== Statistics ==
Legend
G	Goals	K	Kicks	D	Disposals	T	Tackles
B	Behinds	H	Handballs	M	Marks
#	Played in that season's premiership team	†	Led the league for the season

Season	Team	No.	Games	Totals							Averages (per game)							Votes
Season	Team	No.	Games	G	B	K	H	D	M	T	G	B	K	H	D	M	T	Votes
1979^{#}	Carlton	22	24	2	3	227	208	435	85	–	0.1	0.1	9.5	8.7	18.1	3.5	–	13
1980	Carlton	22	23	8	5	202	191	393	91	–	0.3	0.2	8.8	8.3	17.1	4.0	–	3
1981	Carlton	22	10	1	2	99	57	156	30	–	0.1	0.2	9.9	5.7	15.6	3.0	–	1
1982^{#}	Carlton	22	24	6	5	179	130	309	67	–	0.3	0.2	7.5	5.4	12.9	2.8	–	0
1983	Carlton	22	3	0	1	12	11	23	5	–	0.0	0.3	4.0	3.7	7.7	1.7	–	0
1983	Footscray	21	8	3	0	47	58	105	23	–	0.4	0.0	5.9	7.3	13.1	2.9	–	0
1984	Footscray	21	1	0	0	8	4	12	4	–	0.0	0.0	8.0	4.0	12.0	4.0	–	0
Career			93	20	16	774	659	1433	305	–	0.2	0.2	8.3	7.1	15.4	3.3	–	17
