= Stephen Easton =

Australian rules footballer

Personal information
- Full name: Stephen Easton
- Born: 12 August 1959 (age 67)
- Original team: Eltham
- Height: 194 cm (6 ft 4 in)
- Weight: 90.5 kg (200 lb)
- Position: Ruckman/forward

Playing career^{1}
Years	Club	Games (Goals)
1978–1981	North Melbourne	31 (31)
1982	Carlton	1 (0)
Total		32 (31)
- ^{1} Playing statistics correct to the end of 1982.

Stephen Easton (born 12 August 1959) is a former Australian rules footballer who played with North Melbourne and Carlton in the Victorian Football League (VFL). He later played for Port Melbourne in the Victorian Football Association.

Easton's father Kevin was a former North Melbourne player and a club secretary for Geelong Football Club.

In 1975 the North Melbourne Under 19's side were stripped of 58 points on the eve of the finals by the league for illegally fielding Easton in 17 matches during the Home & Away season. It was found he was residentially tied to Geelong. This meant the North side who had finished second on the ladder were relegated to eleventh when the penalty was handed out and missed the finals.

North Melbourne paid Geelong $10,000 to obtain his clearance in 1976.
