= Wayne Harmes =

Australian rules footballer, born 1960

Personal information
- Full name: Wayne Harmes
- Born: 9 February 1960 (age 66)
- Original team: Oak Park
- Height: 176 cm (5 ft 9 in)
- Weight: 85 kg (187 lb)

Playing career^{1}
Years	Club	Games (Goals)
1977–1988	Carlton	169 (86)
1989	Brunswick	7 (17)
Total		176 (103)
- ^{1} Playing statistics correct to the end of 1988.

Career highlights
- 3× VFL premiership player: 1979, 1981, 1982; Norm Smith Medal winner: 1979

Wayne Harmes (born 9 February 1960) is a retired Australian rules footballer in the Victorian Football League.

== Football career ==
Recruited from Oak Park, as a youngster Harmes was perceived to have a lot of talent, finishing third in the 1976 Morrish Medal and winning The Sun newspaper's "Sunkick" competition. He was a grandson of Len Smith and the great nephew of Norm Smith (whose namesake medal he would win in 1979). Harmes debuted in 1977 for the Carlton Football Club, going on to play 169 games for 86 goals until his retirement, due to weight problems in his later career, in 1988. Throughout his career he was considered "hard at the ball" and whilst not tall (176 cm (5 ft 9 in)), he was able to outmark taller opponents. A solid and very well-built (90 kg) player, which allowed him to throw around his considerable strength and made him a tough player. He represented Victoria in State of Origin in 1979 and 1986.

=== 1979 VFL Grand Final ===
Harmes' crowning achievement as a player was in the 1979 VFL Grand Final where he won the inaugural Norm Smith Medal for best player on the ground during a Grand Final. The match itself became part of football folklore for the last-minute heroics displayed by Harmes – he slid along the ground and knocked the ball back into play to set up the winning goal, scored by Ken Sheldon. A debate emerged whether the ball went out of bounds or not at the point Harmes knocked it back in however new footage was found in 2023 that showed that Harmes did successfully keep the ball in.

The match was the first of Harmes' three premiership wins, with him being a part of Carlton's 1981 and 1982 flags.

== Statistics ==
Legend
G	Goals	K	Kicks	D	Disposals	T	Tackles
B	Behinds	H	Handballs	M	Marks
#	Played in that season's premiership team

Season	Team	No.	Games	Totals							Averages (per game)							Votes
Season	Team	No.	Games	G	B	K	H	D	M	T	G	B	K	H	D	M	T	Votes
1977	Carlton	54	1	0	0	1	0	1	0	—N/a	0.0	0.0	1.0	0.0	1.0	0.0	—N/a	0
1978	Carlton	37	17	4	6	181	52	233	65	—N/a	0.2	0.4	10.6	3.1	13.7	3.8	—N/a	5
1979^{#}	Carlton	37	24	25	26	304	103	407	105	—N/a	1.0	1.1	12.7	4.3	17.0	4.4	—N/a	12
1980	Carlton	37	11	5	3	116	67	183	47	—N/a	0.5	0.3	10.5	6.1	16.6	4.3	—N/a	0
1981^{#}	Carlton	37	15	11	7	186	69	255	51	—N/a	0.7	0.5	12.4	4.6	17.0	3.4	—N/a	4
1982^{#}	Carlton	37	21	14	12	253	88	341	107	—N/a	0.7	0.6	12.0	4.2	16.2	5.1	—N/a	7
1983	Carlton	37	19	4	8	233	90	323	112	—N/a	0.2	0.4	12.3	4.7	17.0	5.9	—N/a	8
1984	Carlton	37	12	2	9	112	60	172	51	—N/a	0.2	0.8	9.3	5.0	14.3	4.3	—N/a	0
1985	Carlton	37	19	13	20	184	79	263	88	—N/a	0.7	1.1	9.7	4.2	13.8	4.6	—N/a	4
1986	Carlton	37	19	6	2	231	104	335	104	—N/a	0.3	0.1	12.2	5.5	17.6	5.5	—N/a	12
1987	Carlton	37	0	–	–	–	–	–	–	–	–	–	–	–	–	–	–	–
1988	Carlton	37	11	2	10	76	34	110	24	2	0.2	0.9	6.9	3.1	10.0	2.2	0.2	0
Career			169	86	103	1877	746	2623	754	2	0.5	0.6	11.1	4.4	15.5	4.5	0.2	52

== Honours and achievements ==
Team

- 3× VFL premiership player (Carlton): 1979, 1981, 1982
- 2× McClelland Trophy (Carlton): 1979, 1987

Individual

- Norm Smith Medal: 1979
- State of Origin (Victoria): 1984

== Post-playing career ==
After his playing career, Harmes has been widely outspoken for his views on the current state of Australian rules football, particularly the latest 2006 AFL rule changes. He has claimed that the game is starting to resemble basketball and bemoans the lack of contested possessions, which were commonplace in his playing days.

In 2006 Harmes appeared in a television commercial for Toyota's Memorable Moments series, where he was filmed in a recreation of the final moments of the 1979 Grand Final (with Stephen Curry and Dave Lawson). The commercial was filmed at a local park and took several takes to get right, which caused a large degree of pain for Harmes, he later said.

In 2006 Wayne Harmes coached the Macleod Football Club in Melbourne's Suburban Diamond Valley Football League (DVFL), Now known as the Northern Football League (NFL).

In October 2008, Wayne Harmes was appointed as Senior Coach of Lower Plenty Football Club in the Northern Football League (NFL).
