= Greg Sharp =

Australian rules footballer

Personal information
- Full name: Greg Sharp
- Born: 28 July 1959 (age 67)
- Original team: Western Suburbs (NSW)
- Height: 192 cm (6 ft 4 in)
- Weight: 88 kg (194 lb)
- Position: Wingman/defender

Playing career^{1}
Years	Club	Games (Goals)
1981–1983	Carlton	11 (3)
1984	St Kilda	6 (1)
Total		17 (4)
- ^{1} Playing statistics correct to the end of 1984.

Greg Sharp (born 28 July 1959) is a former Australian rules footballer who played with Carlton and St Kilda in the Victorian Football League (VFL).
