= Bruce Doull =

Australian rules footballer, born 1950

Personal information
- Full name: Alexander Bruce Doull
- Nickname: The Flying Doormat
- Born: 11 September 1950 (age 76); Geelong, Victoria
- Original team: Jacana
- Debut: 3 May 1969, Carlton vs. South Melbourne, at Melbourne Cricket Ground
- Height: 185 cm (6 ft 1 in)
- Weight: 85 kg (187 lb)
- Position: Defender

Playing career^{1}
Years	Club	Games (Goals)
1969–1986	Carlton	356 (22)
- ^{1} Playing statistics correct to the end of 1986.

Career highlights
- 4× VFL Premiership player: (1972, 1979, 1981, 1982); Norm Smith Medal: (1981); 4× Robert Reynolds Trophy: (1974, 1977, 1980, 1984); Carlton Team of The Century: Half-Back Flank; AFL Team of The Century: Half-Back Flank; All-Australian team: (1979); Australian Football Hall of Fame, inducted 1996; Carlton Football Club Hall of Fame: Legend Status; Champions of Carlton: #3; VFL Team of Year: 1984

Alexander Bruce Doull (born 11 September 1950) is a former Australian rules footballer who played for the Carlton Football Club in the Victorian Football League (VFL).

Wearing guernsey number 11, he was nicknamed the "Flying Doormat" due to the matted appearance of the constantly disarranged long portions of his hairstyle. He was recruited from Jacana at the age of 19 as a half-back flanker. Doull was a safe mark, a dependable kick, and a footballer who rarely made a mistake.

Doull, shy and extremely reserved, did not give interviews; instead, he always preferred to stay in the background. He won Carlton's Best & Fairest in 1974, 1977, 1980, and 1984; played in four Carlton premiership sides: 1972, 1979, 1981, and 1982; won the Norm Smith Medal in 1981; and also played in the losing Grand Finals of 1973 and 1986. Doull was also a regular State of Origin representative. In 2009, The Australian nominated Doull as one of the 25 greatest footballers never to win a Brownlow Medal.

He is often remembered as being harassed by Carlton scarf–wearing streaker Helen D'Amico in the 1982 Grand Final between Carlton and Richmond. This incident was the focus of an instalment of the Toyota Memorable Moments advertisement (with D'Amico appearing at the end), and is captured in Jamie Cooper's painting The Game That Made Australia, commissioned by the AFL in 2008 to celebrate the 150th anniversary of the sport. Doull and D'Amico posed for a photo together 25 years later, making it clear they had long since settled their disagreements.

Doull's trademark was his greying beard and the navy blue and white headband which kept his thinning long hair in place. Never reported by the umpires for foul play, he was noted for his determination to play the ball rather than the man, which was rare in an era of occasionally brutal clashes. Brent Crosswell wrote: "Doull's game has a moral purity about it, and that is why opponents have always found it extremely difficult to be unfair to him. It would have shamed them."

Only once did he lose his temper. In a match against Hawthorn, he was tackled around the neck by Kevin Ablett. Bruce chased after Ablett, with the commentator saying "Bruce Doull has gone berserk". Contrary to stories told, he did not have his headband stolen in that incident. The game where his headband was removed was against Essendon in 1983, late in his career. A frustrated Cameron Clayton snatched off his ancient, faded headband and his team-mate Tony Buhagiar ended up with it and threw it into the crowd at VFL Park. Contrary to stories told, he did not go berserk in this incident. These two incidents were in effect combined and recreated in his Toyota Memorable Moments advertisement, except that he remained his usual docile self when he was supposed to lose his temper.

By the end of his career, he had played 356 games – then a club record – and since surpassed only by Craig Bradley. Doull holds the current club record for most consecutive games played, with 162 matches played between 1971 and 1978; he actually missed two club games due to representing Victoria in interstate matches during this streak, but the AFL has formally included such games within a player's consecutive games streak following an amendment to its interpretation in December 2012. Doull kicked just 22 goals over his 18-year career.

== Statistics ==
Legend
G	Goals	K	Kicks	D	Disposals	T	Tackles
B	Behinds	H	Handballs	M	Marks
#	Played in that season's premiership team

Season	Team	No.	Games	Totals							Averages (per game)							Votes
Season	Team	No.	Games	G	B	K	H	D	M	T	G	B	K	H	D	M	T	Votes
1969	Carlton	4	6	2	0	42	24	66	14	—N/a	0.3	0.0	7.0	4.0	11.0	2.3	—N/a	0
1970	Carlton	4	9	0	1	94	29	123	12	—N/a	0.0	0.1	10.4	3.2	13.7	1.3	—N/a	0
1971	Carlton	4	12	0	0	107	32	139	29	—N/a	0.0	0.0	8.9	2.7	11.6	2.4	—N/a	0
1972^{#}	Carlton	11	26	1	0	315	94	409	69	—N/a	0.0	0.0	12.1	3.6	15.7	2.7	—N/a	5
1973	Carlton	11	25	1	0	258	136	394	74	—N/a	0.0	0.0	10.3	5.4	15.8	3.0	—N/a	0
1974	Carlton	11	22	0	1	233	105	338	76	—N/a	0.0	0.0	10.6	4.8	15.4	3.5	—N/a	1
1975	Carlton	11	24	1	2	252	92	344	63	—N/a	0.0	0.1	11.0	4.0	15.0	2.7	—N/a	2
1976	Carlton	11	23	0	1	235	97	332	64	—N/a	0.0	0.0	10.2	4.2	14.4	2.8	—N/a	18
1977	Carlton	11	21	1	0	233	106	339	93	—N/a	0.0	0.0	11.1	5.0	16.1	4.4	—N/a	34
1978	Carlton	11	21	6	3	181	169	350	73	—N/a	0.3	0.1	8.6	8.0	16.7	3.5	—N/a	8
1979^{#}	Carlton	11	21	3	4	174	202	376	69	—N/a	0.1	0.2	8.3	9.6	17.9	3.3	—N/a	5
1980	Carlton	11	22	2	3	182	217	399	68	—N/a	0.1	0.1	8.3	9.9	18.1	3.1	—N/a	5
1981^{#}	Carlton	11	24	3	3	225	168	393	70	—N/a	0.1	0.1	9.4	7.0	16.4	2.9	—N/a	9
1982^{#}	Carlton	11	26	2	5	208	195	403	86	—N/a	0.1	0.2	8.0	7.5	15.5	3.3	—N/a	5
1983	Carlton	11	22	0	1	180	140	320	56	—N/a	0.0	0.0	8.2	6.4	14.5	2.5	—N/a	2
1984	Carlton	11	24	0	0	188	93	281	65	—N/a	0.0	0.0	7.8	3.9	11.7	2.7	—N/a	7
1985	Carlton	11	3	0	0	23	9	32	4	—N/a	0.0	0.0	7.7	3.0	10.7	1.3	—N/a	3
1986	Carlton	11	25	0	0	174	86	260	49	—N/a	0.0	0.0	7.0	3.4	10.4	2.0	—N/a	4
Career			356	22	24	3304	1994	5298	1034	—N/a	0.1	0.1	9.3	5.6	14.9	2.9	—N/a	108

== Honours and achievements ==
Team

- 4× VFL premiership player (Carlton): 1972, 1979, 1981, 1982
- 2× McClelland Trophy (Carlton): 1969, 1979

Individual

- Norm Smith Medal: 1981
- All-Australian team: 1979
- 4× John Nicholls Medal: 1974, 1977, 1980, 1984
- State of Origin (Victoria): 1984
- Australian Football League Team of the Century 1897-1996
- Carlton Team of the Century 1897-1996
