= Allan Montgomery =

Australian rules footballer (1958–2021)

Personal information
- Full name: Allan John Montgomery
- Born: 2 September 1958
- Died: 15 March 2021 (aged 62)
- Original team: Perth (WAFL)
- Height: 189 cm (6 ft 2 in)
- Weight: 82 kg (181 lb)
- Position: Half forward/half back

Playing career^{1}
Years	Club	Games (Goals)
1979–1981 & 1986–1988	Perth	89 (102)
1982–1985	Carlton	33 (6)
Total		122 (108)
- ^{1} Playing statistics correct to the end of 1988.

Allan John Montgomery (2 September 1958 – 15 March 2021) was an Australian rules footballer who played for the Perth Football Club in the West Australian Football League and the Carlton Football Club in the Victorian Football League (VFL).
