= Rod Waddell =

Australian rules footballer

Personal information
- Born: 23 May 1957 (age 69)
- Original team: Southern Districts / Lalor (DVFL)
- Height: 179 cm (5 ft 10 in)
- Weight: 76 kg (168 lb)

Playing career^{1}
Years	Club	Games (Goals)
1981–1982	Carlton	5 (2)
1982–1984	Geelong	20 (10)
Total		25 (12)
- ^{1} Playing statistics correct to the end of 1984.

Rod Waddell (born 23 May 1957) is a former Australian rules footballer who played with Carlton and Geelong in the Victorian Football League (VFL).

Waddell played suburban football for the Lalor Football Club in the Diamond Valley Football League. In 1981, he was recruited to the Victorian Football League, and he was initially zoned to Collingwood, where he played some reserves football. However, this was an error: Lalor was one of only two DVFL clubs which was not part of Collingwood's zone, and Waddell should actually have been zoned to Carlton. Because the Collingwood reserves team had fielded him without the proper clearance, it was stripped of four premiership points that it had earned with him in the team in 1981.

After the error was cleared up, Waddell moved to Carlton. Renowned for his quick pace, Waddell played three senior games in late 1981, and two in 1982 before being cleared to Geelong mid-season. He played a further twenty senior games at Geelong between 1982 and 1984, but struggled to hold a regular position there either.

Waddell is the uncle of Daniel, Shannon and Steven Motlop.

== Sources ==
- Holmesby, Russell & Main, Jim (2007). The Encyclopedia of AFL Footballers. 7th ed. Melbourne: Bas Publishing.
