= 1975 VFL season =

79th season of the Victorian Football League (VFL)

1975 VFL premiership season
- Teams: 12
- Premiers: North Melbourne; 1st premiership
- Minor premiers: Hawthorn; 4th minor premiership
- Brownlow Medallist: Gary Dempsey (Footscray)
- Coleman Medallist: Leigh Matthews (Hawthorn)

Attendance
- Matches played: 138
- Total attendance: 3,206,016 (23,232 per match)
- Highest: 77,770 (regular season); 110,551 (finals)

The 1975 VFL season was the 79th season of the Victorian Football League (VFL), the highest level senior Australian rules football competition in Victoria. The season featured twelve clubs, ran from 5 April until 27 September, and comprised a 22-game home-and-away season followed by a finals series featuring the top five clubs.

The premiership was won by the North Melbourne Football Club, after it defeated Hawthorn by 55 points in the VFL Grand Final. It was North Melbourne's first premiership, making it the last of the league's twelve clubs to win a premiership.

== Background ==
In 1975, the VFL competition consisted of twelve teams of 18 on-the-field players each, plus two substitute players, known as the 19th man and the 20th man. A player could be substituted for any reason; however, once substituted, a player could not return to the field of play under any circumstances.

Teams played each other in a home-and-away season of 22 rounds; matches 12 to 22 were the "home-and-way reverse" of matches 1 to 11 (except that rounds 14 and 15 were the reverse of 4 and 3 respectively).

Once the 22 round home-and-away season had finished, the 1975 VFL Premiers were determined by the specific format and conventions of the "McIntyre final five system".

== Home-and-away season ==
=== Round 1 ===
Home team	Home team score	Away team	Away team score	Venue	Crowd	Date
Hawthorn	15.15 (105)	North Melbourne	11.10 (76)	Princes Park	14,417	5 April 1975
Fitzroy	14.14 (98)	Richmond	15.13 (103)	Junction Oval	14,442	5 April 1975
Essendon	21.10 (136)	St Kilda	9.13 (67)	Windy Hill	19,165	5 April 1975
Collingwood	12.19 (91)	South Melbourne	8.7 (55)	Victoria Park	19,000	5 April 1975
Melbourne	17.9 (111)	Footscray	15.10 (100)	MCG	23,422	5 April 1975
Geelong	8.14 (62)	Carlton	13.16 (94)	Kardinia Park	22,573	5 April 1975

=== Round 2 ===
Home team	Home team score	Away team	Away team score	Venue	Crowd	Date
Carlton	27.10 (172)	Collingwood	10.19 (79)	Princes Park	38,000	12 April 1975
North Melbourne	15.13 (103)	Melbourne	16.9 (105)	Arden Street Oval	14,235	12 April 1975
St Kilda	11.15 (81)	Hawthorn	17.19 (121)	Moorabbin Oval	18,465	12 April 1975
Richmond	15.22 (112)	Geelong	10.12 (72)	MCG	33,600	12 April 1975
Footscray	17.14 (116)	Fitzroy	11.17 (83)	Western Oval	17,700	12 April 1975
South Melbourne	15.12 (102)	Essendon	19.17 (131)	Lake Oval	17,466	12 April 1975

=== Round 3 ===
Home team	Home team score	Away team	Away team score	Venue	Crowd	Date
St Kilda	11.21 (87)	South Melbourne	9.17 (71)	Moorabbin Oval	15,736	19 April 1975
Essendon	16.21 (117)	Melbourne	15.10 (100)	Windy Hill	22,824	19 April 1975
Carlton	14.18 (102)	North Melbourne	9.12 (66)	Princes Park	23,824	19 April 1975
Geelong	13.12 (90)	Footscray	14.14 (98)	Kardinia Park	17,158	19 April 1975
Fitzroy	12.13 (85)	Collingwood	12.15 (87)	Junction Oval	17,626	19 April 1975
Richmond	12.15 (87)	Hawthorn	17.14 (116)	VFL Park	39,496	19 April 1975

=== Round 4 ===
Home team	Home team score	Away team	Away team score	Venue	Crowd	Date
Melbourne	12.8 (80)	St Kilda	18.25 (133)	MCG	35,328	25 April 1975
Carlton	12.15 (87)	Essendon	16.8 (104)	VFL Park	77,770	25 April 1975
Footscray	16.13 (109)	Richmond	4.19 (43)	Western Oval	25,388	26 April 1975
Collingwood	17.10 (112)	Geelong	14.15 (99)	Victoria Park	24,296	26 April 1975
South Melbourne	9.15 (69)	Hawthorn	13.21 (99)	Lake Oval	12,666	26 April 1975
North Melbourne	11.19 (85)	Fitzroy	17.13 (115)	Arden Street Oval	12,707	26 April 1975

=== Round 5 ===
Home team	Home team score	Away team	Away team score	Venue	Crowd	Date
Richmond	19.23 (137)	South Melbourne	12.14 (86)	MCG	25,296	3 May 1975
Hawthorn	19.22 (136)	Melbourne	11.15 (81)	Princes Park	10,622	3 May 1975
Geelong	11.5 (71)	North Melbourne	12.15 (87)	Kardinia Park	17,042	3 May 1975
Fitzroy	19.11 (125)	Essendon	16.17 (113)	Junction Oval	20,350	3 May 1975
St Kilda	7.16 (58)	Carlton	12.19 (91)	Moorabbin Oval	24,275	3 May 1975
Footscray	12.9 (81)	Collingwood	9.16 (70)	VFL Park	36,638	3 May 1975

=== Round 6 ===
Home team	Home team score	Away team	Away team score	Venue	Crowd	Date
Melbourne	22.23 (155)	South Melbourne	13.12 (90)	MCG	15,503	10 May 1975
Essendon	12.21 (93)	Geelong	15.14 (104)	Windy Hill	17,225	10 May 1975
Collingwood	14.12 (96)	Richmond	22.14 (146)	Victoria Park	27,729	10 May 1975
Carlton	16.15 (111)	Hawthorn	12.13 (85)	Princes Park	27,907	10 May 1975
North Melbourne	18.11 (119)	Footscray	9.12 (66)	Arden Street Oval	18,875	10 May 1975
Fitzroy	9.20 (74)	St Kilda	11.16 (82)	VFL Park	18,229	10 May 1975

=== Round 7 ===
Home team	Home team score	Away team	Away team score	Venue	Crowd	Date
Geelong	13.10 (88)	St Kilda	11.14 (80)	Kardinia Park	13,733	17 May 1975
Richmond	19.18 (132)	Melbourne	10.18 (78)	MCG	29,131	17 May 1975
Hawthorn	19.16 (130)	Fitzroy	13.12 (90)	Princes Park	10,389	17 May 1975
Footscray	8.12 (60)	Essendon	14.17 (101)	Western Oval	26,204	17 May 1975
South Melbourne	11.11 (77)	Carlton	19.14 (128)	Lake Oval	14,142	17 May 1975
Collingwood	12.18 (90)	North Melbourne	12.9 (81)	VFL Park	29,354	17 May 1975

=== Round 8 ===
Home team	Home team score	Away team	Away team score	Venue	Crowd	Date
North Melbourne	11.8 (74)	Richmond	9.12 (66)	Arden Street Oval	20,257	24 May 1975
Fitzroy	13.13 (91)	South Melbourne	11.12 (78)	Junction Oval	12,010	24 May 1975
Carlton	16.14 (110)	Melbourne	11.15 (81)	Princes Park	18,788	24 May 1975
St Kilda	7.23 (65)	Footscray	7.12 (54)	Moorabbin Oval	16,838	24 May 1975
Essendon	7.13 (55)	Collingwood	12.9 (81)	Windy Hill	31,986	24 May 1975
Geelong	5.10 (40)	Hawthorn	17.11 (113)	VFL Park	23,466	24 May 1975

=== Round 9 ===
Home team	Home team score	Away team	Away team score	Venue	Crowd	Date
Footscray	8.10 (58)	Hawthorn	20.14 (134)	Western Oval	15,933	31 May 1975
Collingwood	15.8 (98)	St Kilda	13.11 (89)	Victoria Park	22,695	31 May 1975
Carlton	16.19 (115)	Richmond	9.13 (67)	Princes Park	32,576	31 May 1975
South Melbourne	11.26 (92)	Geelong	7.13 (55)	Lake Oval	9,880	31 May 1975
Melbourne	18.15 (123)	Fitzroy	17.10 (112)	MCG	16,244	31 May 1975
North Melbourne	11.17 (83)	Essendon	15.8 (98)	VFL Park	28,936	31 May 1975

=== Round 10 ===
Home team	Home team score	Away team	Away team score	Venue	Crowd	Date
Geelong	14.20 (104)	Melbourne	14.14 (98)	Kardinia Park	13,328	7 June 1975
St Kilda	15.9 (99)	North Melbourne	17.19 (121)	Moorabbin Oval	17,811	7 June 1975
Richmond	19.14 (128)	Essendon	12.9 (81)	MCG	49,469	7 June 1975
Hawthorn	19.24 (138)	Collingwood	13.11 (89)	Princes Park	23,830	7 June 1975
Fitzroy	15.7 (97)	Carlton	16.10 (106)	Junction Oval	16,249	7 June 1975
Footscray	13.11 (89)	South Melbourne	12.15 (87)	VFL Park	14,056	7 June 1975

=== Round 11 ===
Home team	Home team score	Away team	Away team score	Venue	Crowd	Date
Essendon	13.12 (90)	Hawthorn	21.20 (146)	Windy Hill	23,244	16 June 1975
Carlton	19.13 (127)	Footscray	17.13 (115)	Princes Park	25,147	16 June 1975
South Melbourne	12.16 (88)	North Melbourne	16.12 (108)	Lake Oval	16,037	16 June 1975
Geelong	13.19 (97)	Fitzroy	14.11 (95)	Kardinia Park	19,030	16 June 1975
Melbourne	14.11 (95)	Collingwood	9.19 (73)	MCG	42,803	16 June 1975
St Kilda	14.18 (102)	Richmond	13.12 (90)	VFL Park	33,653	16 June 1975

=== Round 12 ===
Home team	Home team score	Away team	Away team score	Venue	Crowd	Date
Footscray	20.11 (131)	Melbourne	14.8 (92)	Western Oval	14,204	21 June 1975
Carlton	23.19 (157)	Geelong	12.14 (86)	Princes Park	16,983	21 June 1975
North Melbourne	13.17 (95)	Hawthorn	18.12 (120)	Arden Street Oval	15,478	21 June 1975
Richmond	13.18 (96)	Fitzroy	13.20 (98)	MCG	21,049	21 June 1975
St Kilda	21.15 (141)	Essendon	11.7 (73)	Moorabbin Oval	18,987	21 June 1975
South Melbourne	11.11 (77)	Collingwood	12.13 (85)	VFL Park	21,154	21 June 1975

=== Round 13 ===
Home team	Home team score	Away team	Away team score	Venue	Crowd	Date
Hawthorn	11.19 (85)	St Kilda	7.19 (61)	Princes Park	15,464	28 June 1975
Geelong	8.13 (61)	Richmond	13.14 (92)	Kardinia Park	14,747	28 June 1975
Fitzroy	11.10 (76)	Footscray	12.17 (89)	Junction Oval	11,832	28 June 1975
Essendon	19.18 (132)	South Melbourne	17.12 (114)	Windy Hill	6,916	28 June 1975
Collingwood	9.12 (66)	Carlton	12.10 (82)	Victoria Park	28,234	28 June 1975
Melbourne	6.10 (46)	North Melbourne	11.14 (80)	VFL Park	12,631	28 June 1975

=== Round 14 ===
Home team	Home team score	Away team	Away team score	Venue	Crowd	Date
Fitzroy	14.12 (96)	North Melbourne	15.15 (105)	Junction Oval	10,034	5 July 1975
St Kilda	15.11 (101)	Melbourne	6.13 (49)	Moorabbin Oval	14,584	5 July 1975
Richmond	17.18 (120)	Footscray	12.10 (82)	MCG	29,501	5 July 1975
Geelong	14.12 (96)	Collingwood	9.11 (65)	Kardinia Park	16,579	5 July 1975
Essendon	15.5 (95)	Carlton	27.13 (175)	Windy Hill	22,632	5 July 1975
Hawthorn	9.10 (64)	South Melbourne	5.9 (39)	VFL Park	14,008	5 July 1975

=== Round 15 ===
Home team	Home team score	Away team	Away team score	Venue	Crowd	Date
Hawthorn	14.10 (94)	Richmond	2.20 (32)	Princes Park	17,115	12 July 1975
Footscray	13.15 (93)	Geelong	7.7 (49)	Western Oval	12,449	12 July 1975
Collingwood	16.19 (115)	Fitzroy	11.7 (73)	Victoria Park	17,127	12 July 1975
South Melbourne	10.10 (70)	St Kilda	19.16 (130)	Lake Oval	11,170	12 July 1975
Melbourne	19.20 (134)	Essendon	16.13 (109)	MCG	16,040	12 July 1975
North Melbourne	9.11 (65)	Carlton	5.14 (44)	VFL Park	26,389	12 July 1975

=== Round 16 ===
Home team	Home team score	Away team	Away team score	Venue	Crowd	Date
Collingwood	16.14 (110)	Footscray	16.7 (103)	Victoria Park	21,746	19 July 1975
Carlton	11.22 (88)	St Kilda	8.27 (75)	Princes Park	21,827	19 July 1975
South Melbourne	8.12 (60)	Richmond	26.11 (167)	Lake Oval	13,411	19 July 1975
Melbourne	15.17 (107)	Hawthorn	17.17 (119)	MCG	18,829	19 July 1975
North Melbourne	14.25 (109)	Geelong	6.19 (55)	Arden Street Oval	11,002	19 July 1975
Essendon	11.11 (77)	Fitzroy	16.19 (115)	VFL Park	13,582	19 July 1975

=== Round 17 ===
Home team	Home team score	Away team	Away team score	Venue	Crowd	Date
Footscray	9.14 (68)	North Melbourne	17.15 (117)	Western Oval	19,639	26 July 1975
St Kilda	12.15 (87)	Fitzroy	7.14 (56)	Moorabbin Oval	15,259	26 July 1975
Geelong	13.16 (94)	Essendon	16.13 (109)	Kardinia Park	14,922	26 July 1975
Richmond	16.19 (115)	Collingwood	10.9 (69)	MCG	56,846	26 July 1975
Hawthorn	15.15 (105)	Carlton	15.11 (101)	Princes Park	31,104	26 July 1975
South Melbourne	11.9 (75)	Melbourne	13.13 (91)	VFL Park	11,427	26 July 1975

=== Round 18 ===
Home team	Home team score	Away team	Away team score	Venue	Crowd	Date
Melbourne	19.13 (127)	Richmond	12.18 (90)	MCG	25,211	2 August 1975
Fitzroy	15.23 (113)	Hawthorn	10.19 (79)	Junction Oval	9,139	2 August 1975
Essendon	11.17 (83)	Footscray	19.13 (127)	Windy Hill	15,227	2 August 1975
Carlton	19.17 (131)	South Melbourne	15.13 (103)	Princes Park	14,039	2 August 1975
North Melbourne	15.20 (110)	Collingwood	8.10 (58)	Arden Street Oval	21,559	2 August 1975
St Kilda	11.18 (84)	Geelong	11.14 (80)	VFL Park	16,706	2 August 1975

=== Round 19 ===
Home team	Home team score	Away team	Away team score	Venue	Crowd	Date
Footscray	5.16 (46)	St Kilda	16.18 (114)	Western Oval	18,107	9 August 1975
Collingwood	20.18 (138)	Essendon	15.9 (99)	Victoria Park	18,664	9 August 1975
Richmond	13.18 (96)	North Melbourne	13.23 (101)	MCG	39,664	9 August 1975
Hawthorn	25.23 (173)	Geelong	8.7 (55)	Princes Park	8,123	9 August 1975
South Melbourne	13.20 (98)	Fitzroy	16.19 (115)	Lake Oval	9,032	9 August 1975
Melbourne	11.23 (89)	Carlton	7.9 (51)	VFL Park	30,328	9 August 1975

=== Round 20 ===
Home team	Home team score	Away team	Away team score	Venue	Crowd	Date
Geelong	12.16 (88)	South Melbourne	15.15 (105)	Kardinia Park	10,973	16 August 1975
Fitzroy	13.22 (100)	Melbourne	13.11 (89)	Junction Oval	13,181	16 August 1975
Essendon	15.15 (105)	North Melbourne	13.13 (91)	Windy Hill	16,545	16 August 1975
St Kilda	20.17 (137)	Collingwood	24.12 (156)	Moorabbin Oval	28,359	16 August 1975
Richmond	13.20 (98)	Carlton	14.11 (95)	MCG	49,756	16 August 1975
Hawthorn	13.13 (91)	Footscray	14.9 (93)	VFL Park	15,601	16 August 1975

=== Round 21 ===
Home team	Home team score	Away team	Away team score	Venue	Crowd	Date
North Melbourne	16.15 (111)	St Kilda	6.5 (41)	Arden Street Oval	14,917	23 August 1975
Collingwood	7.15 (57)	Hawthorn	3.9 (27)	Victoria Park	26,303	23 August 1975
Carlton	10.14 (74)	Fitzroy	11.13 (79)	Princes Park	14,779	23 August 1975
Melbourne	8.16 (64)	Geelong	10.10 (70)	MCG	11,022	23 August 1975
South Melbourne	10.15 (75)	Footscray	18.7 (115)	Lake Oval	8,659	23 August 1975
Essendon	17.15 (117)	Richmond	20.16 (136)	VFL Park	23,601	23 August 1975

=== Round 22 ===
Home team	Home team score	Away team	Away team score	Venue	Crowd	Date
Richmond	17.14 (116)	St Kilda	8.20 (68)	MCG	39,275	30 August 1975
North Melbourne	15.19 (109)	South Melbourne	12.15 (87)	Arden Street Oval	17,031	30 August 1975
Collingwood	14.14 (98)	Melbourne	15.7 (97)	Victoria Park	26,940	30 August 1975
Hawthorn	14.19 (103)	Essendon	17.8 (110)	Princes Park	11,945	30 August 1975
Footscray	10.15 (75)	Carlton	18.11 (119)	Western Oval	21,060	30 August 1975
Fitzroy	14.9 (93)	Geelong	18.11 (119)	VFL Park	11,075	30 August 1975

== Ladder ==
(P)	Premiers
	Qualified for finals

#	Team	P	W	L	D	PF	PA	%	Pts
1	Hawthorn	22	17	5	0	2383	1735	137.3	68
2	Carlton	22	16	6	0	2360	1827	129.2	64
3	North Melbourne (P)	22	14	8	0	2096	1821	115.1	56
4	Richmond	22	13	9	0	2269	1999	113.5	52
5	Collingwood	22	13	9	0	1983	2112	93.9	52
6	St Kilda	22	11	11	0	1982	1954	101.4	44
7	Footscray	22	11	11	0	1968	2076	94.8	44
8	Essendon	22	10	12	0	2222	2451	90.7	40
9	Fitzroy	22	9	13	0	2079	2142	97.1	36
10	Melbourne	22	9	13	0	2092	2234	93.6	36
11	Geelong	22	7	15	0	1735	2218	78.2	28
12	South Melbourne	22	2	20	0	1798	2398	75.0	8

Rules for classification: 1. premiership points; 2. percentage; 3. points for
Average score: 94.6
Source: AFL Tables

== Finals series ==
=== Finals week 1 ===
Home team	Score	Away team	Score	Venue	Crowd	Date
Richmond	11.11 (77)	Collingwood	10.13 (73)	VFL Park	65,512	6 September
North Melbourne	14.12 (96)	Carlton	12.4 (76)	MCG	74,015	6 September

=== Finals week 2 ===
Home team	Score	Away team	Score	Venue	Crowd	Date
Carlton	9.8 (62)	Richmond	9.17 (71)	MCG	76,967	13 September
Hawthorn	12.10 (82)	North Melbourne	10.11 (71)	VFL Park	52,076	13 September

=== Preliminary final ===
Home team	Score	Away team	Score	Venue	Crowd	Date
North Melbourne	10.16 (76)	Richmond	8.11 (59)	VFL Park	71,130	20 September

=== Grand final ===
Home team	Score	Away team	Score	Venue	Crowd	Date
Hawthorn	9.13 (67)	North Melbourne	19.8 (122)	MCG	110,551	27 September 1975

== Season notes ==
- Football matches were telecast in colour, following the official launch of colour television in Australia on 1 March 1975. In response to this, many clubs adopted brighter playing colours: Fitzroy changed its colours from maroon, blue and white to red, blue and gold; Melbourne changed the primary colour of its guernsey from navy blue to royal blue; and other clubs adopted coloured home shorts to replace the black they had previously worn (except Collingwood, Richmond & St Kilda where black is a club colour).
- The centre square replaced the centre diamond (which had been used throughout the 1973 and 1974 VFL seasons).
- There was a wild brawl in the Round 1 match between Hawthorn and North Melbourne involving 34 of the 36 players. Hawthorn's Don Scott and North Melbourne's Brad Smith did not participate. There were no reports from this match.
- Footscray had three new, highly talented recruits from interstate in 1975: 183 cm centreman Peter Featherby from Subiaco Football Club in the West Australian National Football League (WANFL), 183 cm forward Ian Low from Manuka Football Club in the Canberra Australian National Football League (CANFL), and 190.5 cm forward-flanker Neil Sachse from North Adelaide Football Club in the South Australian National Football League (SANFL). In an accidental collision in the Round 2 match against Fitzroy at the Western Oval, Neil Sachse was badly injured and became a quadriplegic.
- On 17 June, Hawthorn announced that it had given full-forward Peter Hudson who had only played three and a half games for Hawthorn in three years, a clearance to Glenorchy.
- The second quarter of the round 14 match between Carlton and Essendon at Windy Hill lasted almost 40 minutes, with Carlton scoring 14.1 (85) to Essendon's 4.1 (25) for a record quarter aggregate score of 18.2 (110). It is the first quarter to beat South Melbourne's 1919 team record of 17.4 (106).
  - Near the end of the quarter, a massive brawl involving all 36 players erupted when Essendon centreman Neville Fields ran past Carlton forward Craig Davis and king-hit him in retaliation for some supposed earlier act of aggression against an Essendon player. Noticing the unconscious Davis, both Rod Ashman and Rod Austin ran to remonstrate with Fields, followed by their Carlton team-mates, and the fight was on. Carlton's Phillip Pinnell knocked out Essendon's Dean Hartigan.
    It took a long time for the match to resume. Field umpire Ian Robinson was showered with cans by spectators. Eight players were reported. Many more players would have been reported had the umpires been able to turn their attention elsewhere (the VFL responded to this problem by introducing two field umpires in the following season).
    The tribunal decisions were:
  - Rod Ashman of Carlton was suspended for 4 weeks, for striking Neville Fields.
  - Rod Austin of Carlton was suspended for 4 weeks, for striking Neville Fields.
  - Phillip Pinnell of Carlton was suspended for 2 weeks, for striking Robin Close.
  - David McKay of Carlton was found guilty of striking Laurie Moloney, and severely reprimanded.
  - Ron Andrews of Essendon was found not guilty of striking David McKay.
  - Robin Close of Essendon was suspended for 2 weeks, for striking Phillip Pinnell.
  - Laurie Moloney of Essendon was suspended for 2 weeks, for charging Phillip Pinnell.
  - Neville Fields of Essendon was found not guilty of striking Rod Austin.
- At the end of the season, greatly dissatisfied with the approach of coach Des Tuddenham (especially his emphasis on "vigour" with players who were renowned for their skill), and disturbed by the fact that, under Tuddenham, Essendon had been involved in two massive brawls in two consecutive years, the committee of the Essendon Football Club sacked Tuddenham and paid out his contract.
  - Also, given the example of an injured John Nicholls in the 1973 Grand Final, and that of Tuddenham having his leg broken in the round 10 match against Richmond, Essendon now recognized the dangers of having its coach on the playing field and liable to injury.

== Awards ==
- The 1975 VFL premiership team was North Melbourne.
- The VFL's leading goalkicker was Leigh Matthews of Hawthorn who kicked 68 goals (including one goal in the finals).
- The winner of the 1975 Brownlow Medal was Gary Dempsey of Footscray with 20 votes.
- South Melbourne took the "wooden spoon" in 1975.
- The reserves premiership was won by Geelong. Geelong 16.18 (114) defeated Richmond 11.17 (83) in the grand final, held as a curtain-raiser to the seniors Grand Final at the Melbourne Cricket Ground on 27 September.

== Sources ==
- 1975 VFL season at AFL Tables
- 1975 VFL season at Australian Football
