= Ian Rice =

Ian Wilfred Rice (born 1939) is an Australian businessman and former president of the Carlton Football Club. He replaced George Harris in a caretaker role in December 1979, but held the position until his resignation in September 1983.

A property developer originally from Brisbane, he was a part-owner, with politician Andrew Peacock, of the 1974 Caulfield Cup winner Leilani. He was the initial franchisee of the Kentucky Fried Chicken chain in Victoria. He later became a City of Melbourne councillor in 1970 and twice ran for mayor of Melbourne during the 1970s.
