= Laurie Moloney =

Australian rules footballer

Personal information
- Full name: Laurie Moloney
- Born: 28 April 1949 (age 77)
- Original team: Leongatha
- Height: 184 cm (6 ft 0 in)
- Weight: 76 kg (168 lb)
- Position: Wing / Back pocket

Playing career^{1}
Years	Club	Games (Goals)
1971–76	Essendon	80 (8)
- ^{1} Playing statistics correct to the end of 1976.

Laurie Moloney (born 28 April 1949) is a former Australian rules footballer who played with Essendon in the Victorian Football League (VFL). Used initially as a wingman, Moloney played his best football for Essendon as a back pocket.

He went to Oakleigh during the 1976 season, then was captain-coach of Queensland club Mayne in 1977. From 1978 to 1982 he played for Belconnen in the ACT, the last two years as captain-coach. In 1983 he left Australia for the United States, to take up a three-year posting with the US Department of Defence.
