= Ross Brewer (footballer) =

Australian rules footballer

Personal information
- Born: 14 August 1953 (age 73)
- Original team: Bentleigh-McKinnon Youth Centre
- Height: 188 cm (6 ft 2 in)
- Weight: 75 kg (165 lb)
- Position: Forward

Playing career^{1}
Years	Club	Games (Goals)
1972–1978	Melbourne	121 (196)
1979–1981	Collingwood	47 (85)
1982–1983	Richmond	6 (8)
1984–1985	Sandringham	31 (151)
1986–1987	Waverley	13 (68)
- ^{1} Playing statistics correct to the end of 1983.

Ross Brewer (born 14 August 1953) is a former Australian rules footballer who played with Melbourne, Collingwood and Richmond in the Victorian Football League (VFL). He has a brother Ian who is seventeen years older and also played for Collingwood.

A strong marking forward, Brewer started his career at Melbourne and topped their goalkicking in 1973, 1974 and 1977. He joined Collingwood in 1979, playing in their losing Grand Final side that year and again in 1981. In 1982 and 1983 he played with Richmond, only playing six games but winning the VFL reserves goalkicking in 1983 with 72 goals. before leaving the VFL. He finished his career in the Victorian Football Association, playing two seasons at Sandringham which yielded 151 goals, and later playing at Waverley.
