= Ken Sheldon =

Australian rules footballer and coach

Personal information
- Full name: Kenneth John Sheldon
- Born: 31 December 1959 (age 66)
- Original team: Mitiamo
- Height: 178 cm (5 ft 10 in)
- Weight: 76 kg (168 lb)

Playing career^{1}
| Years | Club | Games (Goals) |
| 1977–1986 | Carlton | 132 (170) |
| 1987–1989 | St Kilda | 53 (24) |
| Total | | 185 (194) |

Coaching career
| Years | Club | Games (W–L–D) |
| 1990–1993 | St Kilda | 86 (47–38–1) |
- ^{1} Playing statistics correct to the end of 1989.

Career highlights
- 3 x VFL premiership player: 1979, 1981, 1982

Kenneth John Sheldon (born 31 December 1959) is a former Australian rules footballer in the Victorian Football League. He is the father of the former Brisbane Lions' player Sam Sheldon.

== Carlton career ==
Recruited from Mitiamo, Sheldon, a rover, debuted with the Carlton Football Club in 1977. He wore the Number 5 guernsey. In 1979 he kicked 53 goals and lead Carlton's goalkicking for the year. In the 1979 VFL Grand Final he is remembered for receiving the ball from the sliding Wayne Harmes and kicking the winning goal to give the Blues a premiership win over Collingwood.

Sheldon was part of the Blues' 1981 and 1982 premiership sides.

Sheldon also played in Carlton's first ever night premiership in 1983 when an undermanned Blues outfit beat an almost full-strength Richmond team.

== St Kilda career ==
In 1987, Sheldon moved to the St Kilda Football Club after 132 games and 170 goals with Carlton. He went on to play 53 games for 24 goals with the Saints until the end of the 1989 season.

== Coaching career ==
Remaining at St Kilda, Sheldon became their coach from 1990. The 1991 season saw him lead the Saints to their first AFL finals series since 1973 and he was credited with turning the fortunes of the club which again made the finals in 1992. He was not reappointed after the 1993 season, with the post being taken over by Stan Alves. Sheldon went to Adelaide to coach the South Adelaide Football Club from 1994 to mid-1996. He was the St Kilda Football Club's football operations manager from the end of the 2006 season through to the end of the 2007 season.
