= Val Perovic =

Australian rules footballer (born 1953)

Personal information
- Full name: Vladimir Antonio Perovic
- Born: 25 September 1953 (age 73); Zadar, SR Croatia
- Original team: North Ballarat (BFL)
- Height: 192 cm (6 ft 4 in)
- Weight: 88 kg (194 lb)

Playing career^{1}
Years	Club	Games (Goals)
1973–1979	St Kilda	77 (12)
1980–1985	Carlton	97 (1)
Total		174 (13)
- ^{1} Playing statistics correct to the end of 1985.

Vladimir "Val" Perovic (Croatian: Perović; born 25 September 1953) is a former Australian rules footballer who played with St Kilda and Carlton in the VFL.

Born in Croatia (at the time part of Yugoslavia), Perovic emigrated to Ballarat in Australia with his family in 1958, at the age of four. Despite starting his career as a wingman, Perovic played mostly as a defender and was a centre half-back when he first represented Victoria in 1978. After 77 games with St Kilda during the 1970s he moved to Carlton in a trade involving Alex Jesaulenko. He was a member of Carlton premiership teams in 1981 and 1982, playing in the back pocket.

Perovic was noted for his long right-foot kicks. During his time at Carlton, fans would shout "woof!" every time he kicked the ball. Perovic was the first Carlton player whose kicks were acknowledged in this way. This chant, originally based on the crowd mimicking a grunt that Perovic would make when kicking the ball, has since become a traditional chant bestowed upon later long-kicking left-footed Carlton players; specifically, Ang Christou in the 1990s, Chris Bryan in the 2000s, Matthew Watson in the 2010s, and Adam Saad in the 2020s.

Perovic often polled well in the Brownlow Medal, finishing as St Kilda's top vote-getter in the 1978 award and twice for Carlton, which included an eighth placing in 1983.

Perovic lived in Ballarat throughout his VFL career, commuting to Melbourne twice a week for training and then again for matches on the weekend. He worked in the building industry.
