= Peter McConville =

Australian rules footballer

Personal information
- Born: 17 August 1958 (age 68)
- Original team: Golden Square
- Height: 185 cm (6 ft 1 in)
- Weight: 81 kg (179 lb)

Playing career^{1}
Years	Club	Games (Goals)
1978–1985	Carlton	140 (157)
1986–1989	St Kilda	54 (23)
Total		194 (180)
- ^{1} Playing statistics correct to the end of 1989.

Peter McConville (born 17 August 1958) is a former Australian rules footballer who played with Carlton and St Kilda in the VFL.

== Life and career ==
McConville was twenty when he made his debut for Carlton in the 1978 season and he started his career well, managing 38 goals in the season. He played in a variety of positions over the years and was a member of Carlton premiership teams in 1979, 1981 and 1982. In 1986 he crossed to St Kilda where he played out his career.
