= 1975 Knockout Carnival =

Tournament details
- Country: Australia
- Cities: Melbourne, Adelaide
- Dates: 14–15 June 1975
- Format: Single-elimination
- Teams: 4

Final positions
- Champions: Victoria

The 1975 Knockout Carnival was the 19th Australian National Football Carnival, an Australian football interstate competition. The tournament was won by Victoria.

The 1975 carnival represented a significant change in format for the carnival. Previous carnivals had all been played as a stand-alone event in a single host city, with each team playing the others in a round robin competition; but the 1975 carnival was played as a shortened knock-out tournament and split between two cities. Just three games were played: two semi finals and a final. The semi-finals were played as a double-header in Melbourne, and the final was contested a month later in Adelaide. Unlike previous carnivals, no All-Australian team or Tassie Medalist was chosen.

== Squads ==
=== South Australia ===
Name	Age	Position	Club
Russell Ebert (c)	25	Centreman	Port Adelaide
Peter Marker (c)	26	Centreman	Glenelg
Paul Bagshaw	28	Ruck-rover	Sturt
Greg Bennett	26	Rover	Glenelg
Darrell Cahill	26	Rover	Port Adelaide
Peter Carey	21	Ruckman	Glenelg
Colin Casey	22	Half back	Sturt
Bill Cochrane	22	Full-back	Central District
Brian Colbey	28	Half back flanker	Glenelg
Graham Cornes	25	Ruck-rover	Glenelg
Rick Davies	22	Ruckman	Sturt
Ross Dillon	27	Centre half forward	Norwood
Phil Gallagher	20	Wingman	Norwood
Michael Graham	22	Half forward	Sturt
Max James	23	Full-back	Port Adelaide
Bob Keddie	29	Half forward flanker	South Adelaide
Bruce Light	26	Wingman	Port Adelaide
Colin MacVicar	24	Ruckman	Woodville
John McFarlane	23	Wingman	Glenelg
Sandy Nelson	28	Centre half back	Sturt
Barry Norsworthy	22	Rover	Central District
Michael Nunan	25	Rover	Sturt
Wayne Phillis	25	Centre half back	Glenelg
Barrie Robran	26	Ruck-rover	North Adelaide
Rod Seekamp	27	Centre half back	Norwood
Barry Stringer	24	Wingman	North Adelaide
Michael Taylor	21	Back pocket	Norwood
Ken Whelan	22	Full-forward	Sturt
Greg Wild	25	Ruckman	Sturt
Peter Woite	24	Utility	Port Adelaide

=== Tasmania ===
Name	Age	Position	Club
Graeme Mackey (c)	26	Half forward	Sandy Bay
Geoff Cayzer	28	Ruckman	Latrobe
Bob Cheek	29	Ruckman	Clarence
Peter Daniel	25	Key position player	North Launceston
John Emin	23	Ruckman	Hobart
Carl Gaby	25	Wingman	Wynyard
Zigmont Haremza	22	Utility	New Norfolk
Rod Hughes	20	Rover	Scottsdale
Steve Hywood	24	Half back	Sandy Bay
Peter King	21	Rover	Wynyard
Greg Lethborg	25	Utility	Scottsdale
Rod Mayne	20	Forward	North Hobart
Leigh McConnon	21	Wingman	North Hobart
Donald McLeod	20	Centre half forward	North Hobart
David Morrison	24	Back pocket	Sandy Bay
Bruce Neish	25	Half back	North Launceston
Trevor Oakley	22	Half back flanker	North Hobart
Peter Ratcliffe	29	Full-back	Hobart
Kim Saltmarsh	21	Wingman	City-South
Denis Scanlon	20	Ruckman	North Hobart
Darryl Shephard	21	Half forward flanker	Cooee
Trevor Sprigg	28	Centreman	Glenorchy
Hugh Strahan	26	Key position player	Cooee
Darryl Sutton	22	Forward	Glenorchy
Bruce Tschirpig	25	Rover	Latrobe

=== Victoria ===
Name	Age	Position	Club
Alex Jesaulenko (c)	29	Full-forward	Carlton
Ross Abbey	22	Half back flanker	Footscray
Stan Alves	29	Wingman	Melbourne
Kevin Bartlett	28	Rover	Richmond
Peter Bedford	27	Half forward flanker	South Melbourne
Malcolm Blight	25	Centre half forward	North Melbourne
Phil Carman	24	Forward	Collingwood
Gary Dempsey	26	Ruckman	Footscray
Glenn Elliott	24	Utility	St Kilda
Ken Fletcher	27	Wingman	Essendon
Keith Greig	23	Wingman	North Melbourne
Gary Hardeman	25	Utility	Melbourne
Warwick Irwin	23	Ruck-rover	Fitzroy
Wayne Judson	22	Back pocket	St Kilda
Peter Knights	23	Centre half back	Hawthorn
Leigh Matthews	23	Rover	Hawthorn
Craig McKellar	25	Ruckman	Richmond
Kevin Morris	23	Half back flanker	Richmond
Graham Moss	25	Ruckman	Essendon
Bruce Nankervis	24	Half back flanker	Geelong
John 'Sam' Newman	29	Ruckman	Geelong
Kevin O'Keeffe	22	Half back flanker	Fitzroy
Max Richardson	26	Defender	Collingwood
Wayne Richardson	28	Rover	Collingwood
Geoff Southby	24	Full-back	Carlton
Greg Wells	25	Centreman	Melbourne

=== Western Australia ===
Name	Age	Position	Club
Doug Green (c)	23	Centre half back	East Fremantle
Ron Alexander	25	Ruckman	East Perth
Bob Beecroft	23	Key forward	Swan Districts
Peter Burton	28	Ruckman	Subiaco
Max George	23	Full-forward	Swan Districts
Dalton Gooding	20	Wingman	Claremont
David Hollins	24	Centreman	East Fremantle
Mick Jez	21	Wingman	East Fremantle
John Lewis	25	Full-back	Claremont
Stan Magro	20	Centreman	South Fremantle
Gary Malarkey	22	Centre half back	East Perth
Gary McDonald	22	Ruck-rover	Swan Districts
Tony Morley	24	Half forward flanker	South Fremantle
Jeff Murray	22	Ruckman	Claremont
Stan Nowotny	24	Half back flanker	Swan Districts
Leon O'Dwyer	26	Back pocket	West Perth
Brian Peake	21	Utility	East Fremantle
Garry Sidebottom	20	Centre half forward	Swan Districts
Bill Valli	25	Rover	West Perth
Robert Wiley	20	Rover	Perth
Kevin Worthington	21	Ruckman	Claremont

== Results ==
Game	Home team	Home team score	Away team	Away team score	Ground	Crowd	Date
Semi Final	South Australia	17.16 (118)	Tasmania	8.11 (59)	VFL Park	40,006	14 June 1975
Semi Final	Victoria	20.24 (144)	Western Australia	8.15 (63)	VFL Park	40,006	14 June 1975
Final	South Australia	11.15 (81)	Victoria	18.10 (118)	Football Park	38,855	5 July 1975
