= Kevin Bartlett (Australian rules footballer) =

Australian rules footballer (born 1947)

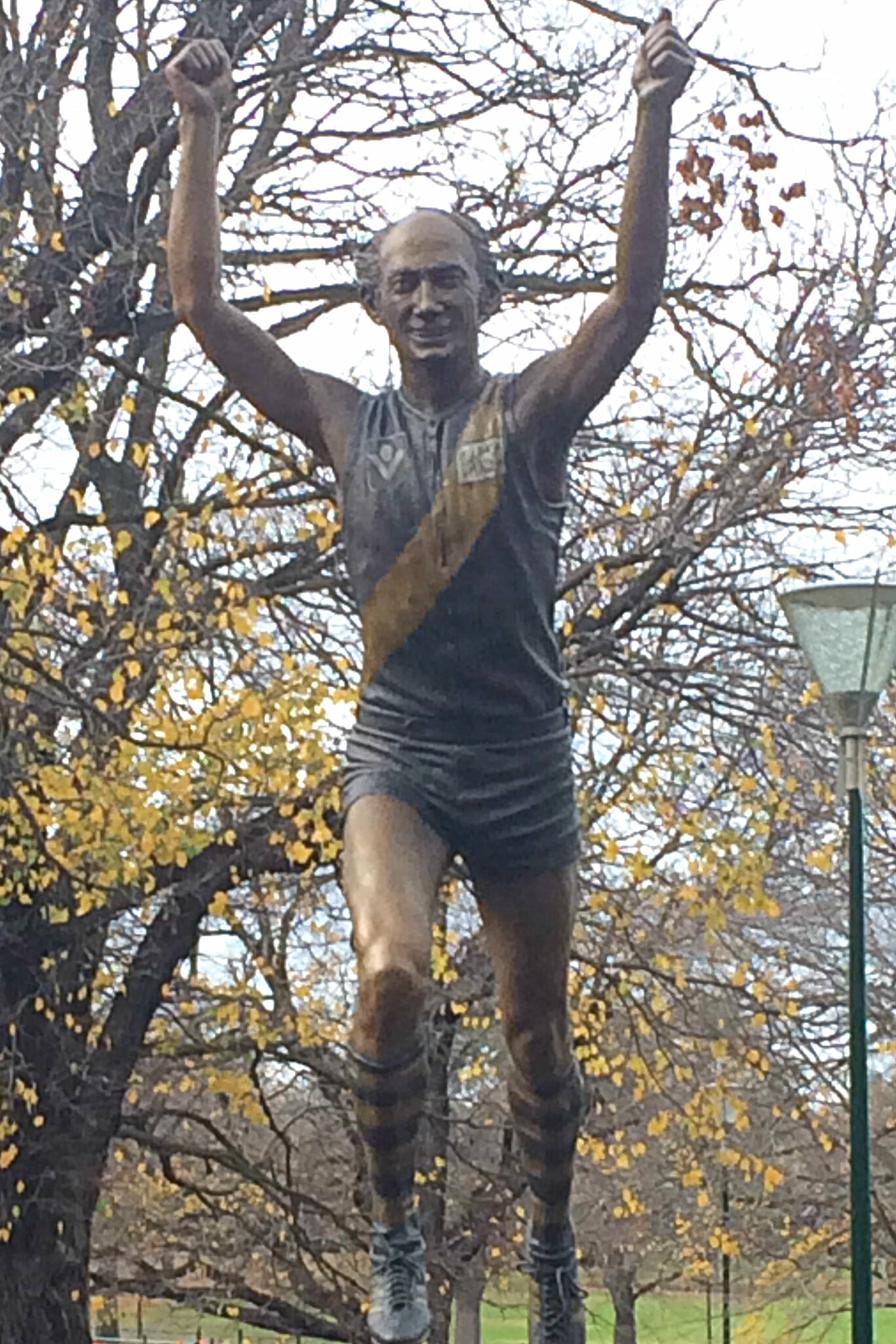
- A bronze statue of Bartlett displayed in Yarra Park by the MCG

Personal information
- Full name: Kevin Charles Bartlett
- Nicknames: KB, Hungry
- Born: 6 March 1947 (age 79); Carlton, Victoria
- Original team: Richmond 4ths
- Height: 177 cm (5 ft 10 in)
- Weight: 71 kg (157 lb)
- Position: Rover / Half forward

Playing career^{1}
Years	Club	Games (Goals)
1965–1983	Richmond	403 (778)

Representative team honours
Years	Team	Games (Goals)
	Victoria	20 (32)

International team honours
1968	Australia	

Coaching career^{3}
Years	Club	Games (W–L–D)
1988–1991	Richmond	88 (27–61–0)
- ^{1} Playing statistics correct to the end of 1983.^{3} Coaching statistics correct as of 1991.

Career highlights
- Club: 5× VFL Premiership player: (1967, 1969, 1973, 1974, 1980); 3× Championship of Australia: (1969, 1973, 1974); Norm Smith Medal: (1980); 5× Jack Dyer Medal: (1967, 1968, 1973, 1974, 1977); 4x Richmond leading Goal Kicker: (1974, 1975, 1977, 1983); Richmond captain: (1979); Media Association Player of the Year: (1979); Richmond Team of The Century; Richmond Hall of Fame – Immortal Status; Richmond Best Individual Performance of the Century; 1973 The Truth Newspaper 'Gold Cazaly'; 1974 The Truth Newspaper 'Gold Cazaly'; 1974 Inside Football Player of the Year; 1974 The Age Footballer of the Year; Representative: 4x National Football Carnival Championship: 1969, 1972, 1975, 1980; National Football Carnival Championship (Captain): 1980; Overall: Australian Football Hall of Fame, inducted 1996, Legend status 2000; Greatest Richmond player as voted by Mike Sheahan covering 1966-2016; Greatest VFL/AFL Finals player, as voted by Rohan Connolly covering 1966-2016; 9th Greatest player as voted by Mike Sheahan covering 1858-2008; 24th Greatest player as voted by Ron Barassi covering 1962-1992

Kevin Charles Bartlett AM (born 6 March 1947) is a former Australian rules footballer who played for the Richmond Football Club in the Victorian Football League (VFL).

Nicknamed "KB" or "Hungry" due to his appetite for kicking goals and apparent reluctance to handpass, Bartlett is a Legend of the Australian Football Hall of Fame and is the first VFL/AFL player to have reached the 400-game milestone, a feat since achieved by five other players as of 2024; he has played the fourth-most games of any player in VFL/AFL history. He is a key member of a golden era in Richmond's history, playing in five premiership teams and winning five Jack Dyer Medals, equalling Jack Dyer's tally.

Bartlett possessed stamina, determination, and skills for dodging round or skirting opposing players trying to intercept him. For most of his career, Bartlett played football as Richmond's starting rover, but was later moved to the half-forward flank towards the end of his career, as demonstrated in the 1980 VFL finals series.

When Bartlett returned to the Tigers in 1988 as senior coach, the club were in a shambles as a result of a bitter trade feud with Collingwood. Although his record as coach appears disappointing, he nonetheless achieved some surprising results with very limited resources. After being sacked at the end of 1991, he distanced himself from Richmond for nearly two decades.

Following his retirement as a player, Bartlett developed a successful career as a sports commentator and broadcaster on both television and radio, currently working as a match caller for 3AW. He was a member of the AFL's rules committee for many years—until he retired on 4 March 2014—as well as the selection panel for the All-Australian Team and AFL Rising Star awards.

In 2008, Bartlett was listed by journalist Mike Sheahan as the ninth-greatest player of all time in the AFL-commissioned book The Australian Game of Football.

== Early years and playing career ==
Bartlett was born in the inner-northern Melbourne suburb of Carlton, the only son of Charles Bartlett, and grew up in Richmond. He supported Footscray as a young boy and was a spectator at the 1954 Grand Final triumph.

As a teenager, he walked from his home in Lennox Street, Richmond, to the Punt Road Oval, where he was greeted by the Richmond Fourths' coach Bill Boromeo. It was this chance meeting that set in motion Bartlett's path towards playing for Richmond. He began his career with the under-17s side, where he won the goalkicking and the best and fairest in 1962. In 1963, he won the best and fairest in the under-19s, and Richmond made the under-19s final series. Bartlett, however, was injured seconds into the first final against Geelong, which resulted in him being taken to the Prince Henry Hospital, where it was revealed that a cyst was embedded in his hip. It was while waiting for the ambulance to collect him in the MCG change rooms that he first met Jack Dyer. Dyer had appeared at the match, on the advice of Richmond under-19s coach Ray Jordon, and visited Bartlett in the rooms to tell him he would be okay. The following year for Bartlett (1964) involved rehabilitation, as he still experienced pain around his hip area.

=== Records ===
Bartlett was also the first player in elite Australian rules football to play 400 premiership games, with only seven others achieving the feat as of 2025: five in the VFL/AFL (Hawthorn's Michael Tuck, North Melbourne's Brent Harvey, Essendon's Dustin Fletcher, Port Adelaide and Hawthorn's Shaun Burgoyne, and Collingwood's Scott Pendlebury), one in the SANFL (Glenelg's Peter Carey), and one in both leagues (Port Adelaide and Carlton's Craig Bradley; Burgoyne also played 26 SANFL games for Port Adelaide prior to his AFL career).

His 403 premiership games remained an elite Australian rules football record until broken by Carey in Round 6 of the 1988 SANFL season, and an elite Victorian football record until broken by Tuck in Round 22 of the 1990 AFL season.

== Other matches and medal ==
Bartlett also played 20 matches for Victoria in interstate football, 17 pre-season/night series matches (which are recognised as senior by the SANFL and WAFL but not the VFL/AFL), and four International Rules matches on the 1968 Australian Football World Tour. If these are considered, then Bartlett played a total of 444 senior career games.

The VFL/AFL lists Bartlett's total as 427 career senior games, excluding his pre-season/night series matches for Richmond.

Depending on the viewpoint taken, Bartlett's total was the elite Australian rules football record until it was broken by Russell Ebert in the 1984 SANFL Grand Final or Round 20 of the 1985 SANFL season: Ebert retired at the end of the 1985 SANFL season with 446 or 447 career senior games.

Bartlett also played nine matches in the VFL reserves and 30 matches in the VFL Under-19s for Richmond: if these are also considered, then Bartlett played a total of 483 overall career games, including 459 career games across the VFL in seniors, reserves, Under-19s, and pre-season/night series matches.

As of the 2026, The Kevin Bartlett Medal is awarded each season to the player who finishes second in the Richmond Football Club's best and fairest count. Previously it was awarded to fifth place.

== Playing statistics ==
Legend
G	Goals	K	Kicks	D	Disposals	T	Tackles
B	Behinds	H	Handballs	M	Marks

Led the league for the season only
Led the league after finals only
Led the league after season and finals

Season	Team	No.	Games	Totals							Averages (per game)						
Season	Team	No.	Games	G	B	K	H	D	M	T	G	B	K	H	D	M	T
1965	Richmond	29	14	13	15	183	21	204	17	—N/a	0.9	1.1	13.1	1.5	14.6	1.2	—N/a
1966	Richmond	29	14	19	17	222	9	231	23	—N/a	1.4	1.2	15.9	0.6	16.5	1.6	—N/a
1967	Richmond	29	20	38	35	415	32	447	42	—N/a	1.9	1.8	20.8	1.6	22.4	2.1	—N/a
1968	Richmond	29	20	38	53	481	32	513	48	—N/a	1.9	2.7	24.1	1.6	25.7	2.4	—N/a
1969	Richmond	29	22	30	43	547	47	594	79	—N/a	1.4	2.0	24.9	2.1	27.0	3.6	—N/a
1970	Richmond	29	22	34	32	569	30	599	79	—N/a	1.5	1.5	25.9	1.4	27.2	3.6	—N/a
1971	Richmond	29	24	53	46	512	41	553	59	—N/a	2.2	1.9	21.3	1.7	23.0	2.5	—N/a
1972	Richmond	29	21	34	35	441	21	462	48	—N/a	1.6	1.7	21.0	1.0	22.0	2.3	—N/a
1973	Richmond	29	23	31	40	634	38	672	44	—N/a	1.3	1.7	27.6	1.7	29.2	1.9	—N/a
1974	Richmond	29	22	47	50	607	40	647	48	—N/a	2.1	2.3	27.6	1.8	29.4	2.2	—N/a
1975	Richmond	29	23	42	50	465	70	535	37	—N/a	1.8	2.2	21.1	3.2	24.3	1.7	—N/a
1976	Richmond	29	22	27	31	512	63	575	72	—N/a	1.2	1.4	23.3	2.9	26.1	3.3	—N/a
1977	Richmond	29	23	55	33	585	80	665	111	—N/a	2.4	1.4	25.4	3.5	28.9	4.8	—N/a
1978	Richmond	29	22	44	39	474	70	544	83	—N/a	2.0	1.9	21.5	3.2	24.7	3.8	—N/a
1979	Richmond	29	22	36	43	447	79	526	66	—N/a	1.6	2.0	20.3	3.6	23.9	3.0	—N/a
1980	Richmond	29	25	84	67	415	59	474	61	—N/a	3.4	2.7	16.6	2.4	19.0	2.4	—N/a
1981	Richmond	29	22	58	48	313	47	360	61	—N/a	2.6	2.2	14.2	2.1	16.4	2.8	—N/a
1982	Richmond	29	23	58	56	266	48	314	53	—N/a	2.5	2.4	11.6	2.1	13.7	2.3	—N/a
1983	Richmond	29	19	37	44	205	31	236	55	—N/a	1.9	2.3	10.8	1.6	12.4	2.9	—N/a
Career			403	778	777	8293	858	9151	1086	—N/a	1.9	1.9	20.6	2.1	22.8	2.7	—N/a

== Honours and achievements ==
**Brownlow Medal votes**
Season	Votes
1965	—
1966	—
1967	4
1968	10
1969	14
1970	10
1971	1
1972	4
1973	8
1974	22
1975	4
1976	2
1977	45
1978	19
1979	5
1980	9
1981	3
1982	—
1983	—
**Total**	**160**
Key:
Green / **Bold** = Won

- **Team**
  - 5× AFL Premiership (Richmond): 1967, 1969, 1973, 1974, 1980
  - 3× McClelland Trophy (Richmond): 1967, 1974, 1982
- **Individual**
  - Norm Smith Medal: 1980
  - 5× Jack Dyer Medal (Richmond F.C. best and fairest): 1967, 1968, 1973, 1974, 1977
  - 4× Michael Roach Medal (Richmond F.C. Leading Goalkicker): 1974, 1975, 1977, 1983 (tied with Michael Roach)
  - Australian Football Media Association Player of the Year Award: 1979
  - Victorian Representative Honours as Captain: 1980
  - **Victorian Representative Honours**
  - Represented "The Galahs" on the Australian Football World Tour: 1968
  - Richmond F.C. Captain: 1979
  - **Richmond F.C. Team of the Century – Rover**
  - Richmond F.C. Hall of Fame Inductee: 2002
  - **Richmond F.C. – Best Individual Performance of the Century**
  - Richmond F.C. Immortal: 2004 (Conferred)
  - Australian Football Hall of Fame Legend: 2000 Inductee
  - Greatest Richmond player, as voted by Mike Sheahan, covering 1966 -2016
  - Greatest VFL/AFL Finals player, as voted by The Age's Rohan Connolly, covering 1966 - 2016
  - 9th Greatest VFL/AFL player, as voted by Mike Sheahan, covering 1858 - 2008
  - 24th Greatest VFL/AFL player, as voted by Ron Barassi, covering 1962-1992
  - 1973 The Truth 'Gold Cazaly' for Best Player in the League
  - 1974 The Truth 'Gold Cazaly' for Best Player in the League
  - 1974 'The Age Footballer of the Year'

== Coaching career ==
Bartlett was the Tigers' coach from 1988 to 1991 during a tumultuous time at Tigerland, where the club was in severe debt, and unable to pay players. He was a key figure in the club's Save Our Skin campaign, where it raised over $1million dollars in six weeks to survive. In the 1988 match against Hawthorn, after two Richmond players were felled, Bartlett was asked for a please explain by the VFL after comments he made. Controversy surrounding his dismissal as coach left him estranged from the football club for many years. However, on 30 March 2007 he attended his first official club function since 1991.

== Administrative career ==
Kevin Bartlett was a key member and public face of the AFL "Laws of the Game" or Rules Committee until 4 March 2014. He was a selector of the Australian Football Hall of Fame from its inauguration in 1996 until his resignation in 2009, and was a selector of the yearly All-Australian team until the end of 2021.

== Media career ==
Bartlett joined Channel 7 in Melbourne immediately after his playing retirement, appearing regularly on World of Sport and hosting the Junior Supporters Club. In 1984, Bartlett was crowned King of Moomba. He also wrote for the Sun News Pictorial. His media commitments were put on hold during his four-year stint as Richmond coach. He has a great all-around interest in most sports and is one of the few ex-Australian football players who has carved out a career commentating on all manner of sports. From 2004, he was a radio host on Melbourne's dedicated sports radio station, SEN – first with Hungry for Sport, a morning show playing on his nickname of "Hungry", and then with KB and the Doc in the afternoon with John "Dr Turf" Rothfield beginning in 2018. He also commentated on Saturday and Sunday matches for SEN. He previously hosted the breakfast program with Dr Turf on Sport 927 until 2003. He commentated on cable TV for Fox Footy and was the host of the popular nostalgia show Grumpy Old Men on Fox Footy until the channel's closure at the end of the 2006 season. He also did a Richmond-centric official alternate commentary for FOX's broadcast of Richmond vs. North Melbourne in June 2014 called "Press Red for Kev" in response to the "Press Red for Ed" Collingwood-centric alternate commentaries led by Eddie McGuire.

On 13 September 2008, he appeared in a Toyota Memorable Moments advertisement. The advertisement includes Bartlett recreating his seven goals from the 1980 VFL Grand Final, as well as his famous 'comb-over' hairstyle, which comedian Dave Lawson recreates by shaving his own hair on camera. Geelong's Matthew Scarlett impersonated the haircut, at his 'Mad Monday' celebrations after the 2008 Grand Final.

Bartlett and fellow Richmond legend Matthew Richardson were also featured on an official 2018 recording of We're From Tigerland.

In 2019, Bartlett departed SEN following a dispute with management. Following this he joined the 3AW football call team as a Sunday caller. In 2024 Kevin Bartlett reunited with his good friend Dr Turf and released ‘The Bald and the Beautiful’ podcast - they have appeared on several media forums together in their media careers.

=== Return ===
Bartlett's refusal to return to any Richmond Football Club function, or an official club arrangement lasted from the end of 1991 until 2007. In 2007, he attended a Tommy Hafey Club Function – in support of his lifelong friend Tom Hafey and on 22 November 2007, walked into the Punt Road ground (Richmond's home ground) to launch the centenary publication Richmond F.C: A Century of League Football, which was written by his son Rhett. It was the first time KB had set foot into Punt Road since his sacking at the end of 1991.

== Recognition ==
Bartlett was made a Member of the Order of Australia in 1981, and was inducted into the Australian Football Hall of Fame and Richmond Hall of Fame in 1996 and 2002, respectively; he was promoted to "legend" status in the Australian Football Hall of Fame in 2000 and to "immortal" status in the Richmond Hall of Fame in 2004. He was also named as part of Richmond's team of the century. He was inducted into the Sport Australia Hall of Fame in 2006. On 22 March 2017, a statue of Bartlett was unveiled outside the Melbourne Cricket Ground.

== Personal life ==
Bartlett married Denise Kilcullen, who was a talented runner as a youth, at St Paul's Anglican Church in Ascot Vale on 28 November 1970. They have four children: three daughters – Sharna, Cara and Breanna – and one son, Rhett. All three of the Bartlett daughters starred in track and field during their school days. Rhett is a writer, broadcaster, and historian of the Richmond Football Club, having published books about both his father and the club's history, as well as curating the "Tigerland Archive" website.

== Bibliography ==
- 1971 Tiger Year Book – Richmond Football Club
- Main, Jim (2006). When it matters most : the Norm Smith Medallist and best on ground in every Grand Final. Melbourne, Victoria: Bas Publishing. ISBN 1920910689.
