= 1972 Perth Carnival =

Tournament details
- Country: Australia
- City: Perth
- Dates: 17–24 June 1972
- Format: Round-robin
- Teams: 4

Final positions
- Champions: Victoria

The 1972 Perth Carnival was the 18th edition of the Australian National Football Carnival, an Australian football interstate competition. It was the last of the traditional single-city round-robin carnivals in the residential qualification era of interstate football.

Four teams took part, Victoria, Western Australia, South Australia and Tasmania, with each playing one another once in a round robin format. Victoria won the Carnival after finishing as the only undefeated team.

Peter McKenna was the most successful goal kicker with 19 goals, followed by Glynn Hewitt and Phil Tierney who kicked 11 each.

== Squads ==
=== Victoria ===
| Name | Age | Position | Club |
|---|---|---|---|
| Ross Smith (c) | 29 | Rover | St Kilda |
| Stan Alves | 26 | Wingman | Melbourne |
| Kevin Bartlett | 25 | Rover | Richmond |
| Peter Bedford | 25 | Centreman | South Melbourne |
| Francis Bourke | 25 | Wingman | Richmond |
| David Clarke | 19 | Half forward flanker | Geelong |
| Barry Davis | 28 | Half back flanker | Essendon |
| Gary Dempsey | 23 | Ruckman | Footscray |
| Keith Greig | 20 | Wingman | North Melbourne |
| Gary Hardeman | 22 | Centre half back | Melbourne |
| Alex Jesaulenko | 26 | Forward | Carlton |
| Peter Knights | 20 | Centre half back | Hawthorn |
| Barry Lawrence | 25 | Centre half back | St Kilda |
| Leigh Matthews | 20 | Rover | Hawthorn |
| Peter McKenna | 26 | Full-forward | Collingwood |
| John Murphy | 22 | Rover | Fitzroy |
| John Nicholls | 32 | Ruckman | Carlton |
| Alan Noonan | 24 | Centre half forward | Essendon |
| Travis Payze | 25 | Ruck-rover | St Kilda |
| David Rhodes | 24 | Wingman | Fitzroy |
| Kevin Sheedy | 24 | Back pocket | Richmond |
| Geoff Southby | 21 | Full-back | Carlton |
| Len Thompson | 25 | Ruckman | Collingwood |
| David Thorpe | 24 | Utility | Footscray |
| John Williams | 24 | Centre half back | Essendon |

=== Western Australia ===
| Name | Age | Position | Club |
|---|---|---|---|
| Mal Brown (c) | 25 | Utility | East Perth |
| Ian Anderson | 23 | Ruckman | West Perth |
| Bob Beecroft | 20 | Ruckman | Swan Districts |
| Greg Brehaut | 25 | Wingman | Perth |
| Barry Cable | 28 | Rover | Perth |
| Brian Ciccotosto | 24 | Rover | South Fremantle |
| Bill Dempsey | 30 | Ruckman | West Perth |
| Mike Fitzpatrick | 19 | Ruckman | Subiaco |
| Gary Gillespie | 28 | Half back flanker | East Perth |
| Doug Green | 20 | Centre half back | East Fremantle |
| Bob Greenwood | 24 | Rover | Claremont |
| John Hayes | 22 | Ruck-rover | East Perth |
| David Hollins | 21 | Centreman | East Fremantle |
| Fred Lewis | 25 | Half forward | East Fremantle |
| Ken McAullay | 22 | Centre half back | East Perth |
| Ian Miller | 22 | Centre half forward | Perth |
| Graham Moss | 22 | Ruckman | Claremont |
| Leon O'Dwyer | 23 | Back pocket | West Perth |
| Peter Stephen | 23 | Half back flanker | East Fremantle |
| Peter Steward | 30 | Centre half back | West Perth |
| Phil Tierney | 30 | Full-forward | East Perth |
| Colin Tully | 27 | Centreman | Claremont |
| Alan Watling | 23 | Wingman | West Perth |
| Mel Whinnen | 29 | Centreman | West Perth |
| George Young | 23 | Wingman | Subiaco |

=== South Australia ===
| Name | Age | Position | Club |
|---|---|---|---|
| Peter Marker (c) | 23 | Half forward | Glenelg |
| Brenton Adcock | 29 | Back pocket | Sturt |
| Paul Bagshaw | 25 | Ruck-rover | Sturt |
| Malcolm Blight | 22 | Ruck-rover | Woodville |
| Tony Burgan | 22 | Wingman | Sturt |
| Neil Button | 20 | Ruckman | Norwood |
| Brian Colbey | 25 | Half back | Glenelg |
| Mark Coombe | 21 | Centreman | South Adelaide |
| Graham Cornes | 24 | Ruck-rover | Glenelg |
| Russell Ebert | 22 | Centreman | Port Adelaide |
| Glynn Hewitt | 19 | Full-forward | West Adelaide |
| Ray Huppatz | 23 | Rover | Woodville |
| Bohdan Jaworskyj | 24 | Centre half back | North Adelaide |
| Bob Kingston | 27 | Centre half forward | Port Adelaide |
| Terry Moore | 20 | Ruckman | Central District |
| Robin Mulholland | 26 | Rover | Central District |
| Sandy Nelson | 26 | Half back | Sturt |
| Dean Ottens | 25 | Ruckman | Sturt |
| Dennis Phillis | 23 | Full-forward | Glenelg |
| Rodney Pope | 26 | Half back | West Adelaide |
| Barrie Robran | 24 | Centre half forward | North Adelaide |
| Ian Verrier | 22 | Ruckman | West Adelaide |
| Terry Von Bertouch | 22 | Rover | North Adelaide |
| Peter Woite | 19 | Wingman | Port Adelaide |
| John Wynne | 23 | Centre half forward | Norwood |

=== Tasmania ===
| Name | Age | Position | Club |
|---|---|---|---|
| Ricky Graham (c) | 25 | Utility | New Norfolk |
| Ian Barwick | 19 | Half back | Longford |
| Mike Booth | 25 | Ruckman | New Norfolk |
| Gary Davis | 22 | Back pocket | Launceston |
| Kerry Doran | 26 | Back pocket | Sandy Bay |
| Jim Frost | 26 | Ruckman | Ulverstone |
| Carl Gaby | 22 | Wingman | Hobart |
| Max Hadley | 25 | Rover | Scottsdale |
| Tony Haenen | 25 | Centre half back | North Launceston |
| Bill Harris | 20 | Full-forward | Latrobe |
| Jim Leitch | 26 | Wingman | Scottsdale |
| Graeme Mackey | 23 | Half forward | Sandy Bay |
| George McInnes | 25 | Ruckman | Wynyard |
| Stephen Nicholls | 19 | Half forward | Scottsdale |
| Robin Norris | 22 | Full-back | Clarence |
| Stewart Palfreyman | 22 | Rover | Sandy Bay |
| Stuart Palmer | 22 | Wingman | City-South |
| Graeme Shephard | 23 | Rover | Cooee |
| Mike Smart | 27 | Ruck-rover | Longford |
| Trevor Sprigg | 25 | Centreman | Glenorchy |
| Darryl Sutton | 19 | Full-forward | Glenorchy |
| Lance Styles | 20 | Ruckman | Scottsdale |
| Max Urquhart | 30 | Utility | Wynyard |
| Bob Whitehouse | 23 | Ruckman | Clarence |
| Bob Wilson | 27 | Ruckman | Scottsdale |

== Results ==
| Game | Winning team | Score | Losing team | Score |
| 1. | Victoria | 32.22 (214) | Tasmania | 4.8 (32) |
| 2. | Western Australia | 15.11 (101) | South Australia | 6.17 (53) |
| 3. | Western Australia | 17.22 (124) | Tasmania | 12.7 (79) |
| 4. | Victoria | 17.9 (111) | South Australia | 8.9 (57) |
| 5. | South Australia | 22.24 (156) | Tasmania | 9.12 (66) |
| 6. | Victoria | 15.19 (109) | Western Australia | 9.11 (65) |

== All-Australian team ==
In 1972 the All-Australian team was picked based on the Perth Carnival.

1972 Perth Carnival All-Australian team
| Name | State | Club |
|---|---|---|
| Malcolm Blight | South Australia | Woodville |
| Tony Burgan | South Australia | Sturt |
| Jim Leitch | Tasmania | Scottsdale |
| David Clarke | Victoria | Geelong |
| Gary Dempsey | Victoria | Footscray |
| Gary Hardeman | Victoria | Melbourne |
| Alex Jesaulenko | Victoria | Carlton |
| Leigh Matthews | Victoria | Hawthorn |
| Peter McKenna | Victoria | Collingwood |
| Travis Payze | Victoria | St Kilda |
| Len Thompson | Victoria | Collingwood |
| David Thorpe | Victoria | Footscray |
| John Williams | Victoria | Essendon |
| Bob Beecroft | Western Australia | Swan Districts |
| Malcolm Brown | Western Australia | East Perth (captain) |
| Brian Ciccotosto | Western Australia | South Fremantle |
| Ken McAullay | Western Australia | East Perth |
| Ian Miller | Western Australia | Perth |
| Alan Watling | Western Australia | West Perth |
| George Young | Western Australia | Subiaco |

== Tassie Medal ==
Ken McAullay of Western Australia won the Tassie Medal with 17 votes, eight more than the runner-up Len Thompson received.
