= 1977 Brownlow Medal =

- Date: 29 August
- Location: Southern Cross Ballroom
- Winner: Graham Teasdale (South Melbourne); 59 votes

Television/radio coverage
- Network: Seven Network

The 1977 Brownlow Medal was the 50th year the award was presented to the player adjudged the fairest and best player during the Victorian Football League (VFL) home and away season. Graham Teasdale of the South Melbourne Football Club won the medal by polling fifty-nine votes during the 1977 VFL season. The count was the second of two occasions in which the two field umpires independently voted for the best players on the ground under the 3-2-1 system. This meant that the winner of the Brownlow had a higher number of votes than usual, and Teasdale's fifty-nine votes set and holds the record for the most votes ever polled in a single season. From 1978 onwards, the field umpires conferred after each game and awarded a single set of votes, rather than voting independently.

== Leading votegetters ==
	Player	Votes
1st	Graham Teasdale (South Melbourne)	59
2nd	Kevin Bartlett (Richmond)	45
3rd	Bill Picken (Collingwood)	41
=4th	Bruce Doull (Carlton)	34
=4th	Len Thompson (Collingwood)	34
=4th	Leigh Matthews (Hawthorn)	34
	Jeff Sarau (St Kilda)*	30
=7th	Gary Dempsey (North Melbourne)	27
=7th	Gary Hardeman (Melbourne)	27
9th	David Dench (North Melbourne)	26
10th	Simon Madden (Essendon)	25

* The player was ineligible to win the medal due to suspension by the VFL Tribunal during the year.
