= 1974 Brownlow Medal =

- Winner: Keith Greig (North Melbourne); 27 votes

Television/radio coverage
- Network: Seven Network

The 1974 Brownlow Medal was the 47th year the award was presented to the player adjudged the fairest and best player during the Victorian Football League (VFL) home and away season. Keith Greig of the North Melbourne Football Club won the medal for the second consecutive year by polling twenty-seven votes during the 1974 VFL season.

== Leading votegetters ==
	Player	Votes
1st	Keith Greig (North Melbourne)	27
2nd	Gary Hardeman (Melbourne)	23
3rd	Kevin Bartlett (Richmond)	22
4th	Gary Dempsey (Footscray)	19
=5th	Leigh Matthews (Hawthorn)	15
=5th	Rex Hunt (Geelong, Richmond)	15
=5th	Francis Bourke (Richmond)	15
8th	Bernie Quinlan (Footscray)	14
9th	John Hendrie (Hawthorn)	13
10th	Graham Moss (Essendon)	12
