= Steven Smith (Australian rules footballer) =

Australian rules footballer (born 1956)

Personal information
- Born: 22 May 1956 (age 70)
- Original team: Bentleigh-McKinnon / Ormond
- Height: 193 cm (6 ft 4 in)
- Weight: 91 kg (201 lb)

Playing career^{1}
| Years | Club | Games (Goals) |
| 1974–1985 | Melbourne | 203 (144) |
- ^{1} Playing statistics correct to the end of 1985.

Career highlights
- Keith 'Bluey' Truscott Medal: 1981

Steven Smith (born 22 May 1956) is a former Australian rules footballer who played with Melbourne in the Victorian Football League (VFL).

Making his debut during the 1974 VFL season, Smith appeared 203 times for Melbourne and kicked 144 goals until his retirement at the end of the 1985 VFL season. In 1981, Smith won the Keith 'Bluey' Truscott Medal, which is awarded to Melbourne's best and fairest player for the season.

Smith was the first Little League player to play in the VFL and is only one of four footballers to have played 200 VFL/AFL games but not play a final (the other three being Trevor Barker, Gary Hardeman and Geoff Cunningham).

In 2015, Smith was elected President of the Melbourne Cricket Club.

At the conclusion of the 2025 AFL season, Smith became President of Melbourne Football Club.

== Statistics ==
Legend
| G | Goals | K | Kicks | D | Disposals | T | Tackles |
| B | Behinds | H | Handballs | M | Marks |

| Season | Team | No. | Games | Totals | | | | | | | Averages (per game) | | | | | | |
| Season | Team | No. | Games | G | B | K | H | D | M | T | G | B | K | H | D | M | T |
|---|---|---|---|---|---|---|---|---|---|---|---|---|---|---|---|---|---|
| 1974 | Melbourne | 35 | 17 | 12 | 6 | 176 | 56 | 232 | 45 | —N/a | 0.7 | 0.4 | 10.4 | 3.3 | 13.6 | 2.6 | —N/a |
| 1975 | Melbourne | 35 | 22 | 24 | 16 | 201 | 48 | 249 | 89 | —N/a | 1.1 | 0.8 | 9.6 | 2.3 | 11.9 | 4.2 | —N/a |
| 1976 | Melbourne | 35 | 19 | 33 | 26 | 240 | 58 | 298 | 122 | —N/a | 1.7 | 1.4 | 12.6 | 3.1 | 15.7 | 6.4 | —N/a |
| 1977 | Melbourne | 35 | 11 | 10 | 7 | 111 | 41 | 152 | 50 | —N/a | 0.9 | 0.7 | 10.1 | 3.7 | 13.8 | 4.5 | —N/a |
| 1978 | Melbourne | 35 | 22 | 17 | 8 | 215 | 65 | 280 | 92 | —N/a | 0.8 | 0.4 | 9.8 | 3.0 | 12.7 | 4.2 | —N/a |
| 1979 | Melbourne | 35 | 16 | 15 | 8 | 135 | 63 | 198 | 70 | —N/a | 0.9 | 0.5 | 8.4 | 3.9 | 12.4 | 4.4 | —N/a |
| 1980 | Melbourne | 35 | 16 | 24 | 30 | 172 | 66 | 238 | 80 | —N/a | 1.5 | 1.9 | 10.8 | 4.1 | 14.9 | 5.0 | —N/a |
| 1981 | Melbourne | 35 | 22 | 2 | 4 | 213 | 77 | 290 | 84 | —N/a | 0.1 | 0.2 | 9.7 | 3.5 | 13.2 | 3.8 | —N/a |
| 1982 | Melbourne | 35 | 18 | 1 | 2 | 122 | 49 | 171 | 54 | —N/a | 0.1 | 0.1 | 6.8 | 2.7 | 9.5 | 3.0 | —N/a |
| 1983 | Melbourne | 35 | 17 | 0 | 0 | 134 | 43 | 177 | 63 | —N/a | 0.0 | 0.0 | 7.9 | 2.5 | 10.4 | 3.7 | —N/a |
| 1984 | Melbourne | 1 | 19 | 6 | 2 | 124 | 50 | 174 | 59 | —N/a | 0.3 | 0.1 | 6.5 | 2.6 | 9.2 | 3.1 | —N/a |
| 1985 | Melbourne | 1 | 4 | 0 | 1 | 20 | 9 | 29 | 4 | —N/a | 0.0 | 0.3 | 5.0 | 2.3 | 7.3 | 1.0 | —N/a |
| Career | | | 203 | 144 | 110 | 1863 | 625 | 2488 | 812 | —N/a | 0.7 | 0.6 | 9.2 | 3.1 | 12.3 | 4.0 | —N/a |
