= 1972 Brownlow Medal =

- Winner: Len Thompson (Collingwood); 25 votes

Television/radio coverage
- Network: Seven Network

The 1972 Brownlow Medal was the 45th year the award was presented to the player adjudged the fairest and best player during the Victorian Football League (VFL) home and away season. Len Thompson of the Collingwood Football Club won the medal by polling twenty-five votes during the 1972 VFL season.

== Leading votegetters ==
	Player	Votes
1st	Len Thompson (Collingwood)	25
2nd	Greg Wells (Melbourne)	22
=3rd	John Williams (Essendon)	18
=3rd	Gary Hardeman (Melbourne)	18
5th	Leigh Matthews (Hawthorn)	16
6th	John Murphy (Fitzroy)	15
7th	John Greening (Collingwood)	14
=8th	Gary Dempsey (Footscray)	12
=8th	David Clarke (Geelong)	12
=8th	Stan Alves (Melbourne)	12
