= 1969 Brownlow Medal =

- Winner: Kevin Murray (Fitzroy); 19 votes

Television/radio coverage
- Network: Seven Network

The 1969 Brownlow Medal was the 42nd year the award was presented. To the player deemed the fairest and best player during the Victorian Football League (VFL) home and away season. Kevin Murray of the Fitzroy Football Club won the medal by polling nineteen votes during the 1969 VFL season.

== Leading votegetters ==
	Player	Votes
1st	Kevin Murray (Fitzroy)	19
=2nd	Barry Davis (Essendon)	18
=2nd	George Bisset (Footscray)	18
4th	Bob Murray (St Kilda)	15
5th	Kevin Bartlett (Richmond)	14
6th	David Thorpe (Footscray)	13
7th	Doug Wade (Geelong)	12
7th	Sam Kekovich (North Melbourne)	12
=9th	John Nicholls (Carlton)	11
=9th	Len Thompson (Collingwood)	11
=9th	Bill Goggin (Geelong)	11
=9th	Michael Green (Richmond)	11
=9th	Kevin Sheedy (Richmond)	11
