= Sam Grimley =

Australian rules footballer (born 1991)

Personal information
- Full name: Sam Grimley
- Nickname: Stones
- Born: 3 January 1991 (age 35)
- Original team: Northern Knights (TAC Cup)
- Draft: No. 39, 2009 national draft
- Debut: Round 9, 2013, Hawthorn vs. Gold Coast, at Melbourne Cricket Ground
- Height: 199 cm (6 ft 6 in)
- Weight: 91 kg (201 lb)
- Position: Forward / Ruckman

Playing career^{1}
Years	Club	Games (Goals)
2010–2015	Hawthorn	3 (3)
2016	Essendon	4 (5)
Total		7 (8)
- ^{1} Playing statistics correct to the end of 2016.

Career highlights
- VFL premiership player: 2013; 2× Frosty Miller Medal 2014, 2015; 3× Box Hill leading goalkicker: 2013–2015; VAFA Premier Division leading goalkicker: 2022; VAFA Premier Division Team of the Year: 2024

Sam Grimley (born 3 January 1991) is an Australian rules footballer who previously played professionally for the Hawthorn Football Club and Essendon Football Club in the Australian Football League (AFL).

== Career ==
After Hawthorn won the 2008 premiership, the Hawthorn recruitment officer concentrated on the younger players in the 2009 AFL draft. Grimley was a third-round selection (Hawthorn), No. 39 overall.

The lightly built former junior basketballer came to Hawthorn as a long-term project. After three years of development, the club started seeing good results. Grimley spent much time close to goal in 2012, hoping to set himself up as a forward/ruck option. He played six games in Box Hill's senior team early in the year but suffered a hand injury. Grimley started 2013 showing strong performances for Box Hill and the selectors were watching. Grimley was named as an emergency for the Hawks on a number of occasions in 2013. An ankle injury to David Hale helped open up an opportunity for Grimley to debut against Gold Coast in Round 9 of the 2013 AFL season. His debut started well by taking an early mark and kicking a goal with his first kick in the AFL. He finished with fourteen possessions and 11 hit-outs before being subbed off at three quarter time.

Grimley did not play a senior game in 2014, and spent the whole season playing with Hawthorn's VFL-affiliate, Box Hill. He tied with Port Melbourne's Daniel Connors as the leading goalkicker in the 2014 VFL home-and-away season, kicking 38 goals for the year. Hawthorn delisted Grimley from its senior list at the end at the end of 2014, but resigned him in the rookie draft. In 2015 he again spent the whole season playing for Box Hill, and with 42 goals was again joint-winner of the Frosty Miller Medal.

He was delisted at the conclusion of the 2015 season. He went undrafted and had signed with WAFL club Subiaco; but in February 2016 he instead signed with Essendon as a top-up player due to the club's supplements controversy.

== Post AFL career ==
After getting delisted by Essendon, Grimley had a 3 season stint with Heidelberg in the (NFNL). He joined the University Blues in the (VAFA) in 2021 and been there for 5 seasons.

== Family ==
He is the son of Brett Grimley and the grandson of Ken Grimley, who were both accomplished footballers in the Queensland Australian Football League.

== Statistics ==
Legend
G	Goals	K	Kicks	D	Disposals	T	Tackles
B	Behinds	H	Handballs	M	Marks	H/O	Hit-outs

Season	Team	No.	Games	Totals								Averages (per game)								Votes
Season	Team	No.	Games	G	B	K	H	D	M	T	H/O	G	B	K	H	D	M	T	H/O	Votes
2010	Hawthorn	35	0	—	—	—	—	—	—	—	—	—	—	—	—	—	—	—	—	0
2011	Hawthorn	35	0	—	—	—	—	—	—	—	—	—	—	—	—	—	—	—	—	0
2012	Hawthorn	35	0	—	—	—	—	—	—	—	—	—	—	—	—	—	—	—	—	0
2013	Hawthorn	35	3	3	2	21	18	39	16	2	24	1.0	0.7	7.0	6.0	13.0	5.3	0.7	8.0	0
2014	Hawthorn	35	0	—	—	—	—	—	—	—	—	—	—	—	—	—	—	—	—	0
2015	Hawthorn	35	0	—	—	—	—	—	—	—	—	—	—	—	—	—	—	—	—	0
2016	Essendon	54	4	5	1	19	8	27	10	5	8	1.3	0.3	4.8	2.0	6.8	2.5	1.3	2.0	0
Career			7	8	3	40	26	66	26	7	32	1.1	0.4	5.7	3.7	9.4	3.7	1.0	4.6	0

== Honours and achievements ==
Team

- Minor premiership (Hawthorn): 2013
- VFL premiership player (Box Hill): 2013
- Minor premiership (Box Hill): 2015

Individual

- 2× Jim 'Frosty' Miller Medal: 2014, 2015
- 3× Box Hill leading goalkicker: 2013, 2014, 2015
