= 1975 Brownlow Medal =

- Winner: Gary Dempsey (Footscray); 20 votes

Television/radio coverage
- Network: Seven Network

The 1975 Brownlow Medal was the 48th year the award was presented to the player adjudged the fairest and best player during the Victorian Football League (VFL) home and away season. Gary Dempsey of the Footscray Football Club won the medal by polling twenty votes during the 1975 VFL season.

== Leading votegetters ==
	Player	Votes
1st	Gary Dempsey (Footscray)	20
2nd	Stan Alves (Melbourne)	19
=3rd	Alex Jesaulenko (Carlton)	18
=3rd	Graham Moss (Essendon)	18
=3rd	John Hendrie (Hawthorn)	18
=6th	Phil Carman (Collingwood)	17
=6th	Brian Roberts (Richmond, South Melbourne)	17
8th	Keith Greig (North Melbourne)	16
9th	George Young (St Kilda)	15
	Sam Newman (Geelong)*	14
=10th	Mike Fitzpatrick Carlton	11
=10th	Robert Flower Melbourne	11
=10th	Gary Hardeman Melbourne	11
=10th	Craig McKellar Richmond	11
	Rod Ashman (Carlton)*	11

* The player was ineligible to win the medal due to suspension by the VFL Tribunal during the year.
