= Lance Styles =

Australian rules footballer

Personal information
- Full name: Lance Gordon Styles
- Born: 6 July 1951 (age 75)
- Original team: Scottsdale
- Height: 185 cm (6 ft 1 in)
- Weight: 85 kg (187 lb)
- Position: Ruckman

Playing career^{1}
Years	Club	Games (Goals)
1973–74	Carlton	3 (0)
- ^{1} Playing statistics correct to the end of 1974.

Lance Styles (born 6 July 1951) is a former Australian rules footballer who played for Carlton in the Victorian Football League (VFL) during the 1970s.

Prior to joining Carlton, Styles was a ruckman at Scottsdale and represented Tasmania in the 1972 Perth Carnival. He shared his league debut with fellow Northern Tasmanian Football Association recruit and Carlton team-mate Craig Davis midway into the 1973 VFL season. However, it was one of only three times that Styles played VFL football and he instead spent most of his time in the reserves.

In 1975, Styles moved to Perth and played in the West Australian National Football League with the Subiaco Football Club. In 1976, he returned to Victoria and played in the Victorian Football Association for the Waverley Football Club, where he won the Field Medal as the second division Best and Fairest in 1978.

== Bibliography ==
- Holmesby, Russell and Main, Jim (2007). The Encyclopedia of AFL Footballers. 7th ed. Melbourne: Bas Publishing.
