= 1973 Brownlow Medal =

Australian rules football player award

- Winner: Keith Greig (North Melbourne); 27 votes

Television/radio coverage
- Network: Seven Network

The 1973 Brownlow Medal was the 46th year the award was presented to the player adjudged the fairest and best player during the Victorian Football League (VFL) home and away season. Keith Greig of the North Melbourne Football Club won the medal by polling twenty-seven votes during the 1973 VFL season.

== Leading votegetters ==
	Player	Votes
1st	Keith Greig (North Melbourne)	27
2nd	Graham Moss (Essendon)	25
3rd	Leigh Matthews (Hawthorn)	23
4th	Len Thompson (Collingwood)	21
5th	Wayne Richardson (Collingwood)	19
=6th	David McKay (Carlton)	17
=6th	Ian Stewart (Richmond)	17
8th	Greg Wells (Melbourne)	16
9th	Gary Dempsey (Footscray)	15
=10th	Garry Wilson (Fitzroy)	14
=10th	Barry Davis (North Melbourne)	14
