= Rod Hughes =

Australian rules footballer

Personal information
- Full name: Rodney V. Hughes
- Born: 20 June 1954 (age 72)
- Original team: Scottsdale
- Height: 178 cm (5 ft 10 in)
- Weight: 73 kg (161 lb)
- Position: Rover

Playing career^{1}
Years	Club	Games (Goals)
1977	St Kilda	7 (3)
- ^{1} Playing statistics correct to the end of 1977.

Rod Hughes (born 20 June 1954) is a former Australian rules footballer who played for St Kilda in the Victorian Football League (VFL).

Hughes, a rover, was a member of the Scottsdale team which claimed the Tasmanian State Premiership in 1973. He represented Tasmania at interstate football in 1975 and made seven appearances with St Kilda in the 1977 VFL season, when they finished last.
