= Stephen Wearne =

Stephen Wearne may refer to:

- Stephen Wearne (Australian footballer) (born 1968), Australian rules footballer
- Stephen Wearne (English footballer) (born 2000), English association footballer
