= Kevin O'Keeffe =

Kevin O'Keeffe may refer to:

- Kevin O'Keeffe (footballer) (born 1952), Australian rules footballer
- Kevin O'Keeffe (politician) (born 1964), Irish Fianna Fáil politician
