= Bob Greenwood =

Bob Greenwood may refer to:

- Bob Greenwood (baseball) (1928–1994), Mexican baseball player
- Bob Greenwood (footballer) (born 1947), Australian rules footballer
