= McConnon =

McConnon is a surname. Notable people with the surname include:

- Jim McConnon (1922–2003), an English cricketer
- Leigh McConnon (born 1953), an Australian rules footballer
