= Dalton Gooding =

Australian football administrator (born 1954)

Dalton Gooding (born 18 November 1954) is a Western Australian businessman, and from 2002 to 2007 he was the chairman of the West Coast Eagles Australian Football League club. He was also a founding partner of the Chartered Accounting firm Gooding Pervan, which later became DFK Gooding Partners.

A former footballer himself, in the early 1970s Gooding moved from his hometown of Dumbleyung in rural Western Australia to take up a three-year $1000 scholarship offered to him by WAFL club Claremont. He played nine seasons for the Tigers and represented Western Australia in a game at the 1975 Knockout Carnival.

== Board Association ==
In addition to his West Coast Eagles chairmanship, Gooding is a principal in the accounting firm DFK Gooding Partners, as well as being on a number of boards.

Company	Board Position
Crosby Tiles	Board Member
Dental Manufacturing SPA (Italy)	Board Member
Elkington Bishop Molineaux Pty Limited	Board Member
Enrich Health Group Pty Ltd	Director
Gateway Capital Ltd	Chairman
J H Wilberforce Pty Limited	Chairman
Katana Capital Limited	Chairman
Pentanet Pty Ltd	Director
Perth Investment Corporation Limited	Chairman
RAC Finance Pty Limited	Board Member
RAC Holdings Pty Limited	Board Member
RAC Insurance Pty Limited	Board Member
RACWA Inc	Board Member
Ruthinium Dental Products (P) Limited (India)	Board Member
Ruthinium Group Pty Limited	Chairman
Service Finance Corporation Ltd	Chairman
St John of God Health Care National Governing Board	Board Member
Sunlec International Pty Limited	Board Member
St Ives Group Pty Ltd	Board Member
Triumphant Nominees Pty Ltd	Board Member
Watermark Enterprises Pty Ltd	Board Member
