= Peter Roozendaal =

Australian rules footballer

Peter Roozendaal (born 14 February 1962) is a former Australian rules footballer who played in Tasmania between the late 1970s and mid-1990s. He was inducted into the Tasmanian Football Hall of Fame in 2012. Roozendaal played for Scottsdale in the Northern Tasmanian Football Association (NTFA).
