= Geoff Cayzer =

Australian rules footballer

Personal information
- Full name: Geoff A. Cayzer
- Born: 7 August 1945 (age 81)
- Original team: Caulfield Grammarians Football Club
- Height: 191 cm (6 ft 3 in)
- Weight: 89 kg (196 lb)
- Position: Ruckman

Playing career^{1}
Years	Club	Games (Goals)
1967, 1971	St Kilda	4 (5)
- ^{1} Playing statistics correct to the end of 1971.

Geoff Cayzer (born 7 August 1945) is a former Australian rules footballer who played for St Kilda in the Victorian Football League (VFL).

In the opening round of the 1967 VFL season, against Footscray at Moorabbin Oval, Cayzer made his league debut and kicked three goals. He made two further appearances that year and the following season joined Latrobe where he was a member of their 1969 and 1970 NWFU premiership teams.

A left footer, Cayzer was given another opportunity by St Kilda in 1971 but could only manage to break into the seniors once. He returned to Latrobe in 1972 for another premiership and represented Tasmania in the 1975 Knockout Carnival.

Cayzer is now the managing director at Cayzer Real Estate in Melbourne.
