= John Emin =

Australian rules footballer

Personal information
- Full name: John Emin
- Born: 29 March 1951 (age 75)
- Original team: Hobart
- Height: 193 cm (6 ft 4 in)
- Weight: 94 kg (207 lb)
- Position: Ruckman

Playing career^{1}
Years	Club	Games (Goals)
1973	Essendon	3 (1)
- ^{1} Playing statistics correct to the end of 1973.

John Emin (born 29 March 1951) is a former Australian rules footballer who played for Essendon in the Victorian Football League (VFL).

Emin's Essendon career was brief, consisting of two games late in the 1973 VFL season and an Elimination Final loss to St Kilda, where he kicked his only career goal. He returned to Hobart in 1974 as captain and won their 'best and fairest' that year as well as finishing runner-up in the William Leitch Medal. A ruckman, Emin represented Tasmania in the 1975 Knockout Carnival.

He crossed to Burnie in 1976 where he would play two seasons and later captain-coach in 1986. In between he had stints as captain-coach of Wynyard, a club he steered to a NWFU premiership in 1979, before captain-coaching Eastlake in Canberra.

Emin currently resides in Hobart where he is employed as a Parking manager for the Hobart City Council.
