= Jeff Murray =

Australian rules footballer

Personal information
- Full name: Jeff Murray
- Born: 7 April 1952 (age 74)
- Original team: Claremont
- Height: 196 cm (6 ft 5 in)
- Weight: 97 kg (214 lb)
- Position: Ruckman

Playing career^{1}
Years	Club	Games (Goals)
1978	Hawthorn	10 (3)
- ^{1} Playing statistics correct to the end of 1978.

Jeff Murray (born 7 April 1952) is a former Australian rules footballer who played for Hawthorn in the Victorian Football League (VFL).

Murray was an established ruckman with Claremont before crossing to Hawthorn and represented Western Australia at the 1975 Knockout Carnival. In 1978, his only VFL season, he shared his debut with Terry Wallace and in total made ten appearances for the seniors. He lost his place in the side on the eve of the finals, with Hawthorn going on to claim the premiership.
