= Coorparoo Football Club =

Australian rules football club in Queensland (1935–1995)

Coorparoo
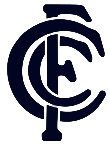

Names
- Full name: Coorparoo Football Club
- Nickname: Roo's

Club details
- Founded: 1935
- Dissolved: 1995; 31 years ago
- Colours
- Competition: QAFL
- Premierships: (6): 1960, 1963, 1964, 1968, 1984, 1986
- Ground: Coorparoo, Queensland

Uniforms
Home

The Coorparoo Football Club was an Australian rules football club based in the Brisbane suburb of Coorparoo from 1935 until the senior club folded in 1995. The club left the QAFL following the 1993 season due to the financial strain experienced since the recent introduction of a minimum salary cap, and joined the Brisbane Australian Football League (BAFL) for the 1994 and 1995 season.

== History ==
Formed in 1935, Coorparoo played in the QAFL from 1941 to 1993. They were nicknamed the Roos. For the 1953 and 1954 seasons, they merged with Yeronga.

Footballers to have played or coached at the club include Carl Ditterich, Jason Dunstall, Kevin O'Keeffe, Terry O'Neill, Michael Gibson, David Wearne, Stephen Wearne, John Pitura, Bill Ryan and Mark Maclure.

When Carl Ditterich left Coorparoo he returned with a notice to sue (for breach of contract) following his sacking by the club's board. The awarded $36 000 placed the club in financial hardship which the Q.A.F.L. premierships in 1984 and 1986 momentarily covered, but in the long term, without an improving local demographic made the club difficult to keep afloat. The insistence of the Q.A.F.L. to introduce a minimum salary cap by the end of the decade would prove catastrophic.

After the 1995 season, the original Coorparoo club sold the facilities to the Brisbane Bears, and although the last senior team to play was in 1995, the name continues in the form of the Coorparoo Junior Australian football club. Twenty years after the original QAFL club folded, the Junior football club is currently following the legacy, with multiple teams in each age group as well as a popular Auskick venue on weekends.

== Honours ==
- QAFL Premiers (6): 1960, 1963, 1964, 1968, 1984, 1986
- Grogan Medalists (5):
  - Tom Calder 1948, 1950
  - Bevis Howell 1952
  - John Golding 1959
  - Ken Grimley 1964
  - Brendan McMullen 1984, 1986
- Joe Grant Medalists (2)
  - Gary Becker 1984
  - Brendan McMullen 1986
- Ray Hughson Medalists (3)
  - 1954 Darryl Sanders - Coorparoo/Yeronga 92 Goals
  - 1980 Robert Fox - Coorparoo 103 Goals
  - 1984 Jason Dunstall - Coorparoo 73 Goals
- Most Games (Top 12)
  - 5th Wayne Stewart - Coorparoo/Mayne 289 Games
  - 6th Dick Verdon - Coorparoo/ Sandgate 283 Games
  - 9th Des Hughes - Coorparoo 279 Games
  - 11th Vic Giffin - Coorparoo 263 Games

QAFL Hall Of Fame (15)

- Tom Calder
- Michael Gibson
- Ken Grimley
- Des Hughes
- Shane Junker
- Ray Marshall
- Noel McGuiness
- Brendan McMullen
- Kevin O'Keefe
- Terry O'Neill
- Bill Ryan
- Darryl Sanders
- Wayne Stewart
- Dick Verdon
- Terry Moule ( Coached 1975 )
- Darren Morris (Note: AFL Qld Umpires association "Team of The Century") Darren played his junior football at Coorparoo.)

Notes

AFLQ Team Of The Century (6)

- Dick Verdon
- Wayne Stewart
- Des Hughes
- Jason Dunstall (VC)
- Ken Grimley
- Noel McGuiness

QAFL Legends (2)

- Dick Verdon
- Jason Dunstall

== See also ==
- Coorparoo Football Club (1996)
