= Steve Hywood =

Australian rules footballer

Personal information
- Full name: Steven Hywood
- Born: 31 May 1950 (age 76)
- Original team: South Broken Hill
- Height: 183 cm (6 ft 0 in)
- Weight: 86 kg (190 lb)

Playing career^{1}
Years	Club	Games (Goals)
1972	Richmond	13 (0)
1973-74, 1976-79	Glenelg	76 (2)
1975	Sandy Bay	19 (13)
- ^{1} Playing statistics correct to the end of 1979.

Steve Hywood (born 31 May 1950) is a former Australian rules footballer who played for Richmond in the Victorian Football League (VFL).

Hywood joined Richmond from South Broken Hill and was a half back flanker in the 1972 VFL Grand Final, the only loss he played in all year. Clearance problems meant that he couldn't continue at Richmond so he transferred to Glenelg and was a member of their drought breaking 1973 premiership team. He played a season in Tasmania, at Sandy Bay, during which time he represented the state at the 1975 Knockout Carnival, before returning to Glenelg, where he played until retiring after the 1979 SANFL season.

After retiring from playing Hywood coached the Glenelg reserves team to consecutive premierships (1981 and 1982), and now runs his own car dealership business in the Adelaide suburb of Darlington.
