= Jim Leitch =

Australian rules footballer

James Kenneth Leitch

Personal information
- Born: 11 August 1945 (age 81)
- Original team: Murrumbeena
- Height: 179 cm (5 ft 10 in)
- Weight: 73 kg (161 lb)

Playing career^{1}
Years	Club	Games (Goals)
1964–1965	Melbourne	12 (7)
- ^{1} Playing statistics correct to the end of 1965.

James Kenneth Leitch (born 11 August 1945) is a former Australian rules footballer who played for Melbourne in the VFL during the mid-1960s. He later played in Tasmania and represented the state in interstate matches.

== Early career ==
A wingman, Leitch made his debut for Melbourne against St Kilda in their premiership year of 1964 but didn't play in the finals. He played ten matches in 1965, having his most successful effort with four goals as a half-forward flanker against Essendon in Round 10.

== Success in Tasmania ==
He later played for Northern Tasmanian Football Association club Scottsdale and was a member of four premiership teams. Leitch represented Tasmania at the 1972 Perth Carnival where he was so prominent that he was chosen in the All-Australian team.

== Honours and achievements ==
Team
NTFA Premiership

- Scottsdale 1968, 1970, 1971, 1973

Individual

- All Australian 1972
- NTFA Best & Fairest 1971 (2nd on count-back)
- club Best & Fairest - Scottsdale (1st) 1969, (3rd) 1966
