= Wayne Judson =

Australian rules footballer

Personal information
- Born: 11 July 1952 (age 74)
- Original team: Beaumaris
- Height: 182 cm (6 ft 0 in)
- Weight: 81 kg (179 lb)

Playing career^{1}
Years	Club	Games (Goals)
1971–1977	St Kilda	124 (0)
- ^{1} Playing statistics correct to the end of 1977.

Wayne Judson (born 11 July 1952) is a former Australian rules footballer who played for St Kilda in the Victorian Football League (VFL) during the 1970s.

Judson was a back pocket specialist and spent seven years with St Kilda. He played in St Kilda's losing 1971 Grand Final team to cap off a solid debut season which saw him play 18 games. A Victorian representative, he was a member of the state side which competed at the 1975 Knockout Carnival. He left St Kilda after struggling in 1977 and joined Victorian Football Association club Mordialloc.
