= George McInnes =

Australian rules footballer

Personal information
- Full name: George McInnes
- Born: 10 May 1946 (age 80)
- Original teams: Brocklesby, Corowa
- Height: 193 cm (6 ft 4 in)
- Weight: 99 kg (218 lb)
- Position: Ruckman

Playing career^{1}
Years	Club	Games (Goals)
1968–70	Richmond	16 (6)
- ^{1} Playing statistics correct to the end of 1970.

George McInnes (born 10 May 1946) is a former Australian rules footballer who played for Richmond in the Victorian Football League (VFL).

A ruckman, McInnes spent three seasons at Richmond, including nine games in their premiership year of 1969. He then played in the North West Football Union with Wynyard and represented Tasmania in the 1972 Perth Carnival.
