= Bob Kingston =

Australian rules footballer

Personal information
- Full name: Robert Kingston
- Born: 17 June 1944 (age 82)
- Original team: Spotswood (WRFL)
- Height: 191 cm (6 ft 3 in)
- Weight: 89 kg (196 lb)
- Position: Key position/Ruckman

Playing career^{1}
Years	Club	Games (Goals)
1961–67	South Melbourne	91 (102)
1968–1970	Norwood	21 (15)
1971–1974	Port Adelaide	51 (62)
Total		163 (179)
- ^{1} Playing statistics correct to the end of 1974.

Robert Kingston (born 17 June 1944) is a former Australian rules footballer who played for South Melbourne in the Victorian Football League (VFL) and Norwood and Port Adelaide in the South Australian National Football League (SANFL) during the 1960s and 1970s.

Kingston was just sixteen when he debuted with South Melbourne in 1961. He was tried in a number of key positions as well as in the ruck and kicked 48 goals from full-forward in 1965 to top the club's goal kicking. This tally included a bag of nine goals against Geelong at Lake Oval mid-season.

The second half of Kingston's career was spent in South Australia. It started at Norwood in 1968 but he could only manage 21 games over three years due to injury. His injury problems kept him out of action for the entire 1970 SANFL season and when he returned the following year it was at Port Adelaide, with whom he played until retiring in 1974.

Kingston played five interstate matches for South Australia, two of which came at the 1972 Perth Carnival.
