= Brian Donohoe (footballer) =

Australian rules footballer (born 1936)

Personal information
- Full name: Brian J. Donohoe
- Born: 21 October 1936 (age 90)
- Original team: Ascot Youth Centre
- Height: 183 cm (6 ft 0 in)
- Weight: 80 kg (176 lb)
- Position: Follower

Playing career^{1}
Years	Club	Games (Goals)
1957–60	Essendon	34 (6)
- ^{1} Playing statistics correct to the end of 1960.

Brian Donohoe (born 21 October 1936) was an Australian rules footballer who played for Essendon in the Victorian Football League (VFL).

Donohoe spent a lot of his time at Essendon playing in the reserves, winning their 'best and fairest' award in 1956 and 1960. He had onl y one full season with the seniors, in 1958 when he made 17 appearances. Donohue also played early in the 1957 and 1959 seasons but lost his place midyear and missed out on both losing Grand Final teams. A follower, he was often seen in the back pocket when not rucking.

In 1961, Donohoe left Essendon and joined Scottsdale in the Northern Tasmanian Football Association (NTFA), as captain-coach. He steered them to back to back NTFA premierships in 1964 and 1965. During his time in Tasmania he represented the state at the 1966 Hobart Carnival. He became captain-coach of Daylesford in 1968 and was later a committeeman at Essendon, serving as chairman of selectors from 1980 to 1986.
