= 1973 Championship of Australia =

Winfield Cup - 1973 Champions of Australia Series

Tournament details
- City: Adelaide
- Dates: 6–8 October 1973
- Teams: 4
- Venue(s): 1

Final positions
- Champions: Richmond (2nd title)
- Runners-up: Subiaco
- Third place: Glenelg
- Fourth place: Scottsdale

Tournament statistics
- Matches played: 4
- Attendance: 43,595 (10,899 per match)

The 1973 Championship of Australia was the 17th edition of the Championship of Australia, an ANFC-organised national club Australian rules football tournament between the champion clubs from the VFL, the SANFL, the WANFL and the Tasmanian State Premiership.

== Qualified Teams ==
Team	Nickname	League	Qualification	Participation (bold indicates winners)
Richmond	Tigers	VFL	Winners of the 1973 Victorian Football League	2nd (Previous: **1969**)
Glenelg	Tigers	SANFL	Winners of the 1973 South Australian National Football League	1st
Subiaco	Lions	WANFL	Winners of the 1973 Western Australian National Football League	1st
Scottsdale	Magpies	NTFA	Winners of the 1973 Tasmanian State Premiership	1st

== Venue ==
- Adelaide Oval (Capacity: **64,000**)

== Fixtures ==
=== Semi-finals ===
**SF #1** 6 October 1973	**Subiaco**	**110-78**	**Scottsdale**	Adelaide Oval, Adelaide
	16.14 (110)		11.12 (78)	Attendance: 34,104

**SF #2** 6 October 1973	**Richmond**	**130-115**	**Glenelg**	Adelaide Oval, Adelaide
	19.16 (130)	Report	16.19 (115)	Attendance: 34,104

=== Third-place play-off ===
**Third Place** 8 October 1973	**Glenelg**	**201-68**	**Scottsdale**	Adelaide Oval, Adelaide
	29.27 (201)		10.8 (68)	Attendance: 9,491

=== Championship of Australia final ===
Final 8 October 1973	**Richmond**	**92-79**	**Subiaco**	Adelaide Oval, Adelaide
	2.1 (13); 5.7 (37); 7.16 (58); 12.20 (92)	Report	7.4 (46); 8.10 (58); 9.16 (70); 10.19 (79)	Attendance: 9,491; Umpires: Murray Ducker
		**Goals**
	R Hunt 4 D Cumming 3 K Morris, N Balme 2 K Bartlett 1		K Ash, M Malone, N Randall, R Bayens 2 K Watt, P Burton 1
