= Ian Miller (Australian footballer) =

Australian rules footballer (1949–2026)

Personal information
- Full name: Ian Robert Miller
- Born: 16 December 1949
- Died: 14 September 2026 (aged 76)
- Original team: Perth (WANFL)
- Height: 185 cm (6 ft 1 in)
- Weight: 86 kg (190 lb)

Playing career^{1}
Years	Club	Games (Goals)
1967-1973	Perth (WANFL)	132 (135)
1974–1977	Fitzroy (VFL)	80 (33)
1978-1980	East Perth (WANFL)	64 (31)
Total		276 (199)
- ^{1} Playing statistics correct to the end of 1980.

Career highlights
- 1968 and 1978 WANFL premiership player; 1972 Sandover Medalist; 1972 All-Australian; Perth Football Club Team of the Century; 2008 West Australian Football Hall of Fame inductee

Ian Robert Miller (16 December 1949 – 14 September 2026) was an Australian rules footballer who played for Fitzroy in the VFL and with Perth and East Perth in the WANFL. He also played in 15 interstate games for Western Australia.

Following in the footsteps of his father, Bob Miller, who played 172 games for Perth, Miller was a versatile player and was often used across half forward and as a ruck-rover. He started his career at WANFL club Perth and was a member of their 1968 premiership side. In 1972 he spent more of the season at centre half-forward and won a Sandover Medal. He also represented Western Australia that year at the Perth Carnival and earned All-Australian selection. The following season he played the last of his 132 games for Perth and was recruited by Fitzroy.

From 1974 to 1977, he was a regular in the Fitzroy side before returning to Western Australia in 1978 to join East Perth. In his debut season for East Perth, he starred in their two-point grand final victory, winning a Simpson Medal. He finished with 64 games at East Perth and from 1982 to 1984 was coach of Perth.

In 1999, he was chosen as a half forward flanker in Perth's official team of the century.

Miller died on 14 September 2026, at the age of 76.
