= 1967 Brownlow Medal =

- Winner: Ross Smith (St Kilda); 24 votes

Television/radio coverage
- Network: Seven Network

The 1967 Brownlow Medal was the 40th year the award was presented to the player adjudged the fairest and best player during the Victorian Football League (VFL) home and away season. Ross Smith of the St Kilda Football Club won the medal by polling twenty-four votes during the 1967 VFL season.

== Leading votegetters ==
	Player	Votes
1st	Ross Smith (St Kilda)	24
2nd	Laurie Dwyer (North Melbourne)	17
3rd	Alex Jesaulenko (Carlton)	15
4th	John Birt (Essendon)	13
=5th	Hassa Mann (Melbourne)	12
=5th	Dick Clay (Richmond)	12
=7th	Len Thompson (Collingwood)	11
=7th	Bill Goggin (Geelong)	11
=7th	Bob Skilton (South Melbourne)	11
10th	John Jillard (Footscray)	10
