= Neil Sachse =

Australian rules footballer (1951–2020)

Personal information
- Full name: Neil Frederick Sachse
- Born: 3 January 1951
- Died: 25 August 2020 (aged 69); Adelaide, South Australia

Playing career^{1}
Years	Club	Games (Goals)
1970–1974	North Adelaide (SANFL)	86 (0)
1975	Footscray (VFL)	2 (1)
- ^{1} Playing statistics correct to the end of 1975.

Neil Frederick Sachse (3 January 1951 – 25 August 2020) was a South Australian National Football League (SANFL) and Victorian Football League (VFL) Australian rules footballer, who was left a quadriplegic after an on-field accident in a 1975 VFL game.

== Footscray career ==
Sachse was a premiership player with North Adelaide before moving to VFL club Footscray in 1975.

In his second match for Footscray (Round 2, 1975), Sachse was left a quadriplegic after an accidental collision with Fitzroy player Kevin O'Keeffe. He was left with no use of his legs, and little movement in his hands. However, he could still move his arms and breathe normally.

== The Neil Sachse Foundation ==
In 1994, Neil Sachse and Dawn Ferrett founded an organisation to raise funds for research into the treatment of spinal cord injury. Originally known as the Spinal Research Fund of Australia Incorporated, it was renamed the Neil Sachse Foundation.

Since 1994, it has raised over $2 million which has funded a research project at Flinders University that proved that nerve fibres in the spine can regenerate past the site of the injury and return some function.

In 2009, in recognition of his tireless work and dedication, Neil was awarded the "Premier's Award for Outstanding Community Achievement in South Australia" at an Awards Ceremony run by the Australia Day Council of SA at Government House.

Sachse's biography, Playing On, written with Michael Sexton, was released through Affirm Press in August 2015.

Sachse died on 25 August 2020.
