= Ron Hall (Australian footballer, born 1945) =

Australian rules footballer

Personal information
- Born: 11 November 1945; Scottsdale, Tasmania
- Died: 26 June 2014 (aged 68); Tasmania

Playing career
Years	Club	Games (Goals)
- Scottsdale

Career highlights
- Premierships player - 1964, 1965, 1968, 1970, 1971, 1973; Tasmanian Football Hall of Fame inductee - 2008

Ronald Maxwell Hall (11 November 1945 – 26 June 2014) was an Australian rules footballer who played in Tasmania during the 1960s and 1970s and represented the state a number of times including matches at the 1969 Adelaide Carnival.

Hall played senior football with Scottsdale in the Northern Tasmanian Football Association. He was a member of six NTFA premiership teams for that club (1964, 1965, 1968, 1970, 1971, 1973) and also played in two sides that were runners-up (1966 & 1974). He was placed a number of times in the club Best and Fairest, finishing second in 1967, and third in 1969, 1974 and 1978.

Ron Hall was inducted as a member of the Tasmanian Football Hall of Fame in 2008.
