= David Wearne =

Australian rules footballer

Personal information
- Full name: David Wearne
- Born: 10 May 1970 (age 56)
- Original team: Coorparoo
- Height: 187 cm (6 ft 2 in)
- Weight: 82 kg (181 lb)

Playing career^{1}
Years	Club	Games (Goals)
1990–1992	Brisbane Bears	18 (2)
- ^{1} Playing statistics correct to the end of 1992.

David Wearne (born 10 May 1970) is a former Australian rules footballer who played with the Brisbane Bears in the Australian Football League (AFL).

Wearne played his early football at Coorparoo and joined Brisbane's senior list after being picked up in the 1990 pre-season draft.

He broke into the team late in the 1990 AFL season and appeared in the final eight rounds of the year, averaging 16 disposals.

In 1991 he played in another eight games and was also a rover in the Brisbane reserves side which won the premiership. They defeated the Melbourne reserves in the grand final, a team which featured his brother Stephen Wearne.

He continued playing in the Queensland Australian Football League when he AFL career ended and in 1994 won the Joe Grant Medal for his performance with Morningside in their grand final win.
