= Bruce Neish =

Australian rules footballer

Personal information
- Full name: Bruce Lachlan Neish
- Born: 23 August 1950 (age 76)
- Original team: Doutta Stars
- Height: 188 cm (6 ft 2 in)
- Weight: 85 kg (187 lb)

Playing career^{1}
Years	Club	Games (Goals)
1970–71	Essendon	21 (13)
1972	Footscray	1 (0)
1972–74	Sunshine (VFA)	10 (6)
- ^{1} Playing statistics correct to the end of 1972.

Bruce Lachlan Neish (born 23 August 1950) is a former Australian rules footballer who played for Essendon and Footscray in the Victorian Football League (VFL) during the early 1970s.

On debut, Neish kicked four out of his team's seven goals in a loss to Melbourne at the MCG. He spent two further seasons in the VFL, the second of which was with Footscray. Neish was used mainly as a half back and ruck rover.

He was with Sunshine for one and a half years before moving to Tasmania in 1974 where he played for East Devonport and then North Launceston. Neith represented the Tasmanian interstate team in the 1975 Knockout Carnival.
