= Hugh Strahan =

Australian rules footballer

Personal information
- Full name: Hugh P. Strahan
- Born: 24 June 1945 (age 81)
- Original teams: Newtown & Chilwell
- Height: 185 cm (6 ft 1 in)
- Weight: 89 kg (196 lb)
- Position: Key position

Playing career^{1}
Years	Club	Games (Goals)
1967–72	Geelong	88 (41)
- ^{1} Playing statistics correct to the end of 1972.

Hugh Strahan (born 24 June 1945) is a former Australian rules footballer who played for Geelong in the Victorian Football League (VFL) during the late 1960s and early 1970s.

A key position player, Strahan spent six seasons at Geelong and took part in their 1968 and 1969 finals campaigns.

The next stage of Strahan's career took place in Tasmania, which he represented in the 1975 Knockout Carnival. Strahan played with Cooee Football Club and was a good performer for the North West Football Union in inter-league matches.

In 1977 he became coach of his original club, Newtown & Chilwell in Geelong.
