= Tom Calder =

Australian rules footballer

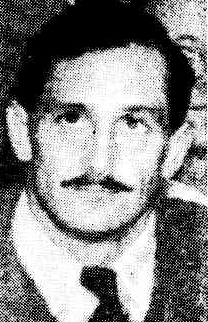

Personal information
- Full name: Thomas Charles Calder
- Born: 17 December 1917; Carlton, Victoria
- Died: 23 June 1997 (aged 79)
- Original team: Coorparoo
- Height: 183 cm (6 ft 0 in)
- Weight: 83 kg (183 lb)

Playing career^{1}
Years	Club	Games (Goals)
1945	South Melbourne	5 (0)
- ^{1} Playing statistics correct to the end of 1945.

Thomas Charles Calder (17 December 1917 – 23 June 1997) was an Australian rules footballer who played with South Melbourne in the Victorian Football League (VFL). He is a member of the Queensland Football Hall of Fame.

Although born in Victoria, Calder played his early football in Tasmania and started his senior career at North Hobart in 1935. While with North Hobart, Calder suffered a serious on-field injury and had a kidney removed.

A centre-half back, he made his way to Queensland Australian National Football League club Ascot in 1940 and joined the Royal Australian Air Force in the same year, serving as a pilot during the war.

Calder was posted at Melbourne in 1945 and was joined VFL club South Melbourne, with whom he would make five successive appearances from round 14. Although the club went on to make the grand final, Calder wasn't selected in any finals fixtures.

When Calder returned to the QANFL in 1946, it was with Mayne, but after just one season he crossed to Coorparoo as captain-coach. He represented Queensland at interstate football regularly post war, until 1953, including matches in the 1947 Hobart and 1950 Brisbane Carnivals. In 1948 he was captain-coach of Queensland and had his most successful season with Coorparoo, winning the league's Grogan Medal. Calder won the award once more in 1950 and after retiring continued his involvement in Queensland football as an administrator.
