= Ian Anderson (Australian footballer) =

Australian rules footballer (born 1948)

Personal information
- Full name: Ian Gregory Anderson
- Born: 14 October 1948 (age 78); Horsham, Victoria
- Original team: Miga Lake
- Height: 191 cm (6 ft 3 in)
- Weight: 84 kg (185 lb)
- Position: Forward

Playing career^{1}
Years	Club	Games (Goals)
1967–68, 1971	Essendon	27 (49)
- ^{1} Playing statistics correct to the end of 1971.

Ian Gregory Anderson (born 14 October 1948) is a former Australian rules footballer who played with Essendon in the Victorian Football League (VFL).

Anderson, who was recruited to Essendon from Miga Lake, debuted in 1967 and finished the year with 21 goals. A forward, he kicked a career best tally of seven goals against Hawthorn in the opening round of the 1968 season. He didn't play in 1969 or 1970 due to war service in Vietnam, where he fought as a Private with the 8th Battalion, Royal Australian Regiment. When he returned he spent one final season at Essendon before moving to Western Australia and representing his adopted state at the 1972 Perth Carnival.
