= Michael Gibson (Australian footballer) =

Australian rules footballer

Personal information
- Full name: Michael Gibson
- Born: 31 October 1965 (age 61); Queensland
- Original team: Coorparoo (QAFL)
- Height: 187 cm (6 ft 2 in)
- Weight: 92 kg (203 lb)
- Position: Half back flanker

Playing career^{1}
Years	Club	Games (Goals)
1985	Fitzroy	3 (0)
1987–91	Brisbane Bears	52 (3)
Total		55 (3)
- ^{1} Playing statistics correct to the end of 1991.

Michael Gibson (born 31 October 1965) is a former Australian rules footballer who played for Fitzroy and the Brisbane Bears in the Victorian/Australia Football League (VFL/AFL).

Gibson, a half back flanker, was a Coorparoo premiership player in 1984 in the Queensland Australian Football League (QAFL) and played with Fitzroy the following season. He then returned to Coorparoo in 1986 and participated in another premiership team. A member of Brisbane's inaugural VFL list, Gibson spent five seasons with the club.

Amongst his 15 interstate matches for Queensland were appearances at the 1988 Adelaide Bicentennial Carnival. He had also been an All-Australian junior for his state.

The defender went on to become a coach in the Queensland Football League, with stints at Coorparoo and Mount Gravatt.
