= Terry O'Neill (footballer) =

Australian rules footballer

Personal information
- Born: 10 June 1956 (age 70); Narrandera, New South Wales
- Original team: Narrandera
- Height: 189 cm (6 ft 2 in)
- Weight: 81 kg (179 lb)
- Position: Defender

Playing career^{1}
Years	Club	Games (Goals)
1975–1980	South Melbourne	73 (14)
1981–1983	Fitzroy	28 (1)
Total		101 (15)
- ^{1} Playing statistics correct to the end of 1983.

Terry O'Neill (born 10 June 1956) is a former Australian rules football player who played with the South Melbourne and Fitzroy Football Clubs in the Victorian Football League (VFL).

After two modest seasons, which brought him just 11 games, O'Neill was one of South Melbourne's best players in 1977. Despite having never played as a defender previously, O'Neill spent the season as a full-back. O'Neill kept Peter Hudson to three goals on the two occasions they met that year, which was impressive considering the Hawthorn full-forward kicked 110 goals for the season. He polled well in the Brownlow Medal count, with 14 votes, to finish as his club's second top votegetter, behind only the winner Graham Teasdale. Originally from Narrandera, he also played every VFL game during the season and didn't miss a game again in 1978.

O'Neill played just once in 1980 and instead spent the season in the VFA with Port Melbourne. He was the full-back in Port's premiership team that year.

He returned to the VFL in 1981 as a Fitzroy player and took part in their finals campaign that season. His first appearance in 1983, against Footscray at Waverley Park, was his 100th league game and he played just one more time for Fitzroy.

In 1984 he was a member of Queensland club Coorparoo's premiership team and played in another premiership two years later. He also coached Coorparoo, in 1987 and 1988. State captain in 1988, O'Neill represented Queensland at interstate football on 25 occasions.
