= Brett Grimley =

Australian rules footballer

Personal information
- Full name: Brett Grimley
- Born: 3 March 1960 (age 66)
- Original team: Wilston Grange
- Height: 190 cm (6 ft 3 in)
- Weight: 92 kg (203 lb)

Playing career^{1}
| Years | Club | Games (Goals) |
| 1983–85 | Fitzroy | 18 (2) |
- ^{1} Playing statistics correct to the end of 1985.

Brett Grimley (born 3 March 1960) is a former Australian rules footballer who played for Fitzroy in the Victorian Football League (VFL) during the 1980s.

Grimley started out in the Queensland Australian Football League where he played with Wilston Grange. He made his Fitzroy debut in the opening round of the 1983 season but was unable to establish himself in the side. After returning to Queensland, Grimley had success as Wilston Grange's full-forward and kicked 107 goals in 1987 to top the QAFL goal-kicking. He represented Queensland at the 1988 Adelaide Bicentennial Carnival.

His father, Ken, is a member of the Queensland 'Team of the Century' and also spent some time at Fitzroy. They are the only father and son combination from the state to have competed in the VFL. His son, Sam, was also a professional AFL footballer for Hawthorn and Essendon.
