= Kevin O'Keeffe (footballer) =

Australian rules footballer

Personal information
- Full name: Kevin Michael O'Keeffe
- Born: 22 October 1952 (age 74)
- Original team: Terang
- Height: 180 cm (5 ft 11 in)
- Weight: 83 kg (183 lb)
- Position: Half back

Playing career^{1}
Years	Club	Games (Goals)
1973–1979, 1982	Fitzroy	92 (36)
1980-1981	East Perth	24 (1)
Total		116 (37)
- ^{1} Playing statistics correct to the end of 1982.

Career highlights
- QAFL Hall of fame; Coorparoo premiership player (1984, 1986)

Kevin O'Keeffe (born 22 October 1952) is a former Australian rules footballer who played with Fitzroy in the VFL during the 1970s.

O'Keeffe, a half back, represented Victoria in an interstate match against Western Australia at the 1975 Knockout Carnival. In the same year, while playing for Fitzroy, he accidentally collided with Footscray's Neil Sachse, leaving Sachse a quadriplegic.

In 1980, he transferred to East Perth where he played for two seasons before making an unsuccessful comeback with Fitzroy. His next port of call was Queensland club Coorparoo and he played in their 1984 and 1986 premiership sides. The red haired O'Keeffe later served briefly as coach of Coorparoo and while in Queensland, represented the state on 16 occasions, captaining them in 1986.
