= Graham Teasdale =

Australian rules footballer

Personal information
- Full name: Graham Teasdale
- Born: 26 June 1955 (age 71)
- Original team: Charlton
- Height: 193 cm (6 ft 4 in)
- Weight: 92 kg (203 lb)
- Positions: Full-forward, ruck

Playing career^{1}
Years	Club	Games (Goals)
1973	Richmond	6 (16)
1975–1981	South Melbourne	121 (138)
1982–1983	Collingwood	14 (21)
Total		141 (175)

Representative team honours
Years	Team	Games (Goals)
	Victoria	3
- ^{1} Playing statistics correct to the end of 1983.

Career highlights
- Richmond Reserves premiership player: 1973; South Melbourne leading Goalkicker: 1975; Brownlow Medallist: 1977; South Melbourne Best and Fairest: 1977; Collingwood Reserves captain: 1983

Graham Teasdale (born 26 June 1955) is a former Australian rules football player who played for the Richmond Football Club in the Victorian Football League (VFL) between 1972 and 1975, for the South Melbourne Football Club from 1975 to 1981 and then for the Collingwood Football Club from 1982 to 1984.

While at Richmond, Teasdale played mainly in the under 19s, where he was one of the leading goalkickers, and in the reserves side. But the move to the Swans in 1975 saw him establish himself as a senior player. In his best season, 1977, Teasdale won the South Melbourne best and fairest and the Brownlow Medal with the highest score of 59 votes.
