= Michael Jez =

Australian rules footballer

Personal information
- Full name: Michael Jez
- Born: 7 June 1954 (age 72)
- Height: 187 cm (6 ft 2 in)
- Weight: 80 kg (176 lb)
- Position: Wing

Playing career^{1}
Years	Club	Games (Goals)
1974-1978	East Fremantle	75 (122)
1979–1980	Carlton	2 (0)

Representative team honours^{2}
Years	Team	Games (Goals)
1975–1978	Western Australia	3 (0)
- ^{1} Playing statistics correct to the end of 1980.^{2} Representative statistics correct as of 1978.

Michael Jez (born 7 June 1954) is a former Australian rules footballer who played with Carlton in the Victorian Football League (VFL).
