= Bob Greenwood (footballer) =

Australian rules footballer

Personal information
- Full name: Robert Edward Greenwood
- Born: 24 March 1947 (age 79)
- Original team: Pascoe Vale
- Height: 175 cm (5 ft 9 in)
- Weight: 79 kg (174 lb)
- Position: Rover

Playing career^{1}
Years	Club	Games (Goals)
1967–71	Essendon	62 (70)
1972–75	Claremont	41
- ^{1} Playing statistics correct to the end of 1975.

Robert Edward Greenwood (born 24 March 1947) is a former Australian rules footballer who played with Essendon in the Victorian Football League (VFL) during the late 1960s and early 1970s.

Greenwood, a rover, came to Essendon from Pascoe Vale and made his league debut in 1967. Despite playing 12 games in the 1968 home and away season, Greenwood lost his place in the side for the finals series and subsequently missed out on Essendon's Grand Final appearance. He averaged over a goal a game for Essendon and kicked 23 goals in 1970.

Greenwood left the VFL in 1972 and was signed by Claremont, where he played until 1975. While in Western Australia he represented the state at the 1972 Perth Carnival. He finished his career in 1976, as captain-coach of Queensland club Kedron.
