= 1970 Brownlow Medal =

- Winner: Peter Bedford (South Melbourne); 25 votes

Television/radio coverage
- Network: Seven Network

The 1970 Brownlow Medal was the 43rd year the award was presented to the player adjudged the fairest and best player during the Victorian Football League (VFL) home and away season. Peter Bedford of the South Melbourne Football Club won the medal by polling twenty-five votes during the 1970 VFL season.

== Leading votegetters ==
	Player	Votes
1st	Peter Bedford (South Melbourne)	25
2nd	Gary Dempsey (Footscray)	21
3rd	Alex Jesaulenko (Carlton)	20
4th	Barry Cable (North Melbourne)	19
=5th	Barry Price (Collingwood)	17
=5th	John McIntosh (St Kilda)	17
7th	Francis Bourke (Richmond)	16
8th	Bill Goggin (Geelong)	15
=9th	Peter Hudson (Hawthorn)	14
=9th	Daryl Griffiths (St Kilda)	14
