= Ken Grimley =

Australian rules footballer

Personal information
- Full name: Ken Grimley
- Born: 7 February 1936
- Original team: Wilston Grange
- Height: 189 cm (6 ft 2 in)
- Weight: 80 kg (176 lb)

Playing career^{1}
Years	Club	Games (Goals)
1957	Fitzroy	9 (16)
- ^{1} Playing statistics correct to the end of 1957.

Ken Grimley (born 7 February 1936) is a former Australian rules footballer who played with Fitzroy in the Victorian Football League (VFL).

Grimley was a rugby league full-back while growing up in Brisbane and only took up Australian football after leaving school. He started out in the Wilston Grange junior team but soon broke into the seniors and in 1955 played in the club's first ever QANFL premiership. The following year he was the league's top goal-kicker with over 100 goals.

He spent just one season at Fitzroy, having been invited to the club by officials he met during an exhibition game in Brisbane. In just his second appearance, but first full game, Grimley kicked six goals from full-forward against Geelong at Kardinia Park.

After he returned to Wilston Grange in 1958 he is credited as having convinced the club to adopt a Gorilla as their logo, which Fitzroy had changed from the previous year. Grimley, who also played as a ruckman, switched to Coorparoo in 1959 and played grand finals in his first six seasons at the club. He was the runner-up in the 1961 Grogan Medal but won it in 1964. The early 1960s also saw him play many of his 22 interstate appearances for Queensland and the state was undefeated under his captaincy in 1963 and 1964.

A son, Brett Grimley, also played with Fitzroy, to create the first instance of a Queensland father and son combination playing in the VFL.

In 2003, Grimley was named as the ruckman in the official "Queensland Team of the Century", next to rovers Michael Voss and Jason Akermanis.
