= Leigh McConnon =

Australian rules footballer and coach

Personal information
- Full name: Leigh McConnon
- Born: 9 June 1953 (age 73)
- Original team: North Hobart
- Height: 177 cm (5 ft 10 in)
- Weight: 75 kg (165 lb)
- Position: Wingman

Playing career^{1}
Years	Club	Games (Goals)
1976–77	Carlton	26 (4)
1980–81	Fitzroy	23 (4)
Total		49 (8)
- ^{1} Playing statistics correct to the end of 1981.

Leigh McConnon (born 9 June 1953) is a former Australian rules footballer who played for Carlton and Fitzroy in the Victorian Football League (VFL).

A professional sprint racer before coming to Carlton, McConnon had also been a good player at North Hobart and was a member of their 1974 premiership team. McConnon represented Tasmania in the 1975 Knockout Carnival.

He made a Preliminary Final in his first season with Carlton but McConnon, a wingman, lost his place in the side the following season and returned to Tasmania. Fitzroy lured him back to league football in 1980 and he played a further two seasons. In 1992, McConnon was appointed senior coach of Clarence.
