= John Lewis (footballer, born 1949) =

Australian rules footballer

Personal information
- Full name: John E. Lewis
- Born: 25 July 1949 (age 77)
- Original team: Claremont
- Height: 188 cm (6 ft 2 in)
- Weight: 87 kg (192 lb)
- Position: Full-back

Playing career^{1}
Years	Club	Games (Goals)
1970	Hawthorn	3 (0)
- ^{1} Playing statistics correct to the end of 1970.

John E. Lewis (born 25 July 1949) is a former Australian rules footballer who played with Hawthorn in the Victorian Football League (VFL).

Lewis, who played at Claremont before and after his VFL stint, broke into the Hawthorn side late in the 1970 season. A full-back, he appeared in their last three games of the year and then returned to Claremont. In 1975, he represented Western Australia at interstate football.
