= Bob Wilson (footballer, born 1945) =

Australian rules footballer

Personal information
- Full name: Robert Matthew Wilson
- Born: 4 October 1945 (age 81)
- Original team: Essendon U19s
- Height: 180 cm (5 ft 11 in)
- Weight: 76 kg (168 lb)

Playing career^{1}
Years	Club	Games (Goals)
1966	Essendon	4 (0)
- ^{1} Playing statistics correct to the end of 1966.

Robert Matthew 'Bob' Wilson (born 4 October 1945) is a former Australian rules footballer who played for Essendon in the Victorian Football League (VFL).

Wilson played his early football at the Essendon Under-19s before being loaned to Brunswick in the Victorian Football Association (VFA). He was then returned to Essendon and made his senior debut in 1966. He made four appearances in the 1966 VFL season, all of which Essendon won, but spent most of his time in the reserves where he won their Best and Fairest. Wilson spent the next two seasons back at Brunswick before being appointed captain-coach of Tasmanian club Scottsdale in 1969. He steered the club to three NTFA premierships and to a Tasmanian State Premiership in 1973.

He left Scottsdale after the 1976 season and then captain-coached Ringarooma. He also had a stint as coach of NWFU club Latrobe.
