= John Williams (Australian footballer, born 1947) =

Australian rules footballer

Personal information
- Born: 17 July 1947 (age 79)
- Original team: Rochester (Bendigo FL)
- Height: 189 cm (6 ft 2 in)
- Weight: 87 kg (192 lb)

Playing career^{1}
Years	Club	Games (Goals)
1965–1973	Essendon	161 (14)
1974–1976	Collingwood	35 (8)
Total		196 (22)
- ^{1} Playing statistics correct to the end of 1976.

John Williams (born 17 July 1947) is a former Australian rules footballer who played with Essendon and Collingwood in the VFL. A defender, Williams played his best football in the early 1970s with Essendon. He finished second in the club's 1971 best and fairest awards and was equal third in the 1972 Brownlow Medal count. In 1972 he also represented Victoria at the Perth Carnival and earned All Australian selection.

After leaving Collingwood in 1976, Williams was appointed captain of VFA club Brunswick where he led the club to the VFA's first semi-final against Coburg in 1977; its last appearance in the VFA's First Division finals.
