= Gary McDonald (Australian footballer) =

Australian rules footballer

Personal information
- Full name: Gary W. McDonald
- Born: 3 March 1953 (age 73)
- Original team: Swan Districts
- Height: 178 cm (5 ft 10 in)
- Weight: 83 kg (183 lb)
- Position: Centreman

Playing career^{1}
Years	Club	Games (Goals)
1978–80	St Kilda	14 (8)
- ^{1} Playing statistics correct to the end of 1980.

Gary McDonald (born 3 March 1953) is a former Australian rules footballer who played with St Kilda in the Victorian Football League (VFL).

McDonald started his football career in Western Australia where he played for Swans Districts. He represented his state at interstate football in 1975 and in 1978 made his debut for St Kilda. The club struggled during the three years he was at the club and he experienced victory just once in 14 games. McDonald kicked bags of three goals in successive weeks midway through the 1979 season.
