= Stephen Wearne (Australian footballer) =

Australian rules footballer (born 1968)

Personal information
- Full name: Stephen Wearne
- Born: 5 October 1968 (age 58)
- Original teams: Sandringham, (VFL)
- Draft: 1. 22, 1991 Mid-year Draft

Playing career^{1}
Years	Club	Games (Goals)
1992	Melbourne	3 (2)
- ^{1} Playing statistics correct to the end of 1992.

Stephen Wearne (born 4 October 1968) is a former Australian rules footballer who played for Melbourne in the Australian Football League (AFL) in 1992.

Originally from Queensland Australian Football League QAFL club Coorparoo, Wearne moved to Victoria to play for Sandringham Football Club in the Victorian Football Association (VFA). Melbourne drafted him with the 22nd selection in the 1991 Mid-year Draft.

He is the brother of David Wearne, who played for the Brisbane Bears.
