= Scottsdale Football Club =

Scottsdale

Names
- Full name: Scottsdale Football Club
- Nickname(s): Magpies

Club details
- Founded: 1889; 136 years ago
- Colours
- Competition: Northern Tasmanian Football Association

Uniforms
Home

The Scottsdale Football Club is an Australian rules football club which competed in the old Northern Tasmanian Football Association (NTFA) between 1948 and 1986. Scottsdale joined the Northern Tasmanian Football League in 1987. For financial reasons, Scottsdale could no longer field a team in the NTFL and in 2000 switched to the new NTFA, an amateur competition which had been formed four years earlier. Scottsdale, nicknamed The Magpies, currently play in a competition of the Northern Tasmanian Football Association (formed 1996).

== History ==
Scottsdale were formed in 1889 and although they originally competed in red and white colours, the club switched to black and white once admitted into the NTFA for the 1948 season.

By 1973, Scottsdale had five NTFA premierships, in the space of eight years. In their finest ever season, the Magpies finished the home and away fixtures undefeated, with their only failure being a draw with North Launceston. It would be North Launceston who they would meet and account for in the Grand Final and the club went on to win the Tasmanian State Premiership with a 65-point thrashing of Hobart and narrow 11-point victory over Cooee, both away from home. They had come from behind in their game against Cooee, having trailed by 32 points down going into the final quarter.

As the premier club in Tasmania, Scottsdale were invited to the 1973 Championship of Australia where they competed against that year's premiership winners from the three major leagues, Glenelg, Richmond and Subiaco. The Scottsdale team of 1973, which had been captain-coached by Bob Wilson, was inducted into the Tasmanian Football Hall of Fame in 2005, the first club to receive such an honour.

With the disbandment of the NTFA, Scottsdale joined the Northern Tasmanian Football League in 1987. They were premiers in 1989 as well as losing grand finals in 1990 and 1993. For financial reasons, Scottsdale could no longer field a team in the NTFL and in 2000 switched to the new NTFA, an amateur competition which had been formed four years earlier. They claimed a premiership in 2001 with a 35 points victory over George Town in the Grand Final.

== Honours ==
=== Club ===
- Northern Tasmanian Football Association (10): 1964, 1965, 1968, 1970, 1971, 1973, 1977, 1982, 1984, 1986
- Northern Tasmanian Football Association (formed 1996) (1): 2001
- Tasmanian State Premiership (1): 1973
- Northern Tasmanian Football League (1): 1989

=== Individual ===
Tasman Shields Trophy winners

- Charlie Dennis 1952

Hec Smith Memorial Medalists

- Max Hadley 1972
- Stephen Nichols 1977
- Ricky Rattray 1978
- David Noonan 1979
- Jamie Dennis 1982, 1984

=== Team of the Century ===
In 2000, Scottsdale named an official 'Best Team 1960 to 2000'

'Best Team 1960 to 2000'
B:	Max Davidson	Chris Wood	Danny Hall
HB:	Greg Lethborg	Don Millwood	Tim Gillespie
C:	Jim Leitch	Mannie Goninon	Bob Taylor
HF:	Stephen Nichols	Ron Hall	Max Hadley
F:	Rod Hughes	Ken Lette	Rex Lethborg
Foll:	Peter Roozendaal	Bob Wilson	Jamie Dennis
Int:	Karl Beattie	Troy Milne	Graeme Millwood
Int:	Stan Wilson	Brian Donohoe	Kevin Symons
Coach:	-		
