= Keith Greig =

Australian rules footballer, born 1951

Keith Greig MBE

Personal information
- Full name: Keith Southby Greig
- Nickname: Racehorse
- Born: 23 October 1951 (age 75)
- Original team: Brunswick (VFA)
- Height: 180 cm (5 ft 11 in)
- Weight: 79 kg (174 lb)
- Positions: Wing, Half Back flank

Playing career^{1}
Years	Club	Games (Goals)
1968–1970	Brunswick	27 (73)
1971–1985	North Melbourne	294 (48)
Total		321 (121)

Representative team honours
Years	Team	Games (Goals)
	Victoria	13
- ^{1} Playing statistics correct to the end of 1985.

Career highlights
- VFL Premiership player: (1975); 2× Brownlow Medal: (1973, 1974); North Melbourne captain: (1976–1979); Syd Barker Medal: (1980); Victoria captain 1978; All-Australian team: (1983); Australian Football Hall of Fame, inducted 1996; AFL Team of the Century (wing); MBE: (1975)

Keith Southby Greig MBE (born 23 October 1951) is a former Australian rules footballer who played for the North Melbourne Football Club in the Victorian Football League (VFL).

Red-haired and pale-skinned, Greig was regarded as one of the most graceful players of his era with superb ball-handling skills. His stamina and free-flowing running style made him a perfect wingman, but in his later years he was used more as a half back flanker. He is one of few players to win back-to-back Brownlow Medals and was an inaugural inductee in the Australian Football Hall of Fame.

== Playing career ==
Greig played his junior football for Brunswick in the Victorian Football Association, and in 1968 he won the Gillon Medal as the best and fairest in the VFA Thirds competition. He was recruited to the VFL by North Melbourne, at the age of 19. From the beginning his technical brilliance did not go unnoticed, and he was picked for his first State Representative game after only having played nine senior VFL matches. Greig went on to represent the Big V 12 more times over his career, and was state captain in 1978.

In 1973, he won the Brownlow Medal with 27 votes. In 1974, he became the eighth player to win the Brownlow twice, again with 27 votes, and the fifth player to win it back-to-back. North played in the 1974 VFL Grand Final, their second appearance in a Grand Final. They lost to Richmond, but Greig was one of North's best players.

The following year, North won their first VFL premiership and again, Greig was among North's best players. Earlier in the year, he had been awarded membership of the Order of the British Empire for his services to football. With the retirement of Barry Davis, Greig was appointed club captain at the start of the 1976 VFL season. But it was a position he did not relish, and he resigned from the captaincy at the end of 1979, partly as a result of the relationship break down with coach Ron Barassi.

In Round 6 of the 1977 VFL season against Richmond, Greig injured his right knee in a collision. After six weeks on the sidelines, he played against Hawthorn but broke down the following week. Greig underwent surgery to repair the ligaments in the knee in July and subsequently missed out on the 1977 premiership. He was named an All-Australian in 1983. Greig's final VFL match was the 1985 semi-final against Footscray, which North Melbourne lost by 30 points.

== Relationship with Ron Barassi ==
To many outside observers, the partnership between Greig as captain and coach Ron Barassi during the 1970s was among the best in the league. But in 2004, Greig revealed in an interview that the relationship became so strained that at the end of 1979 he resigned the captaincy and came close to leaving the club. Although Barassi was known for saying things he later regretted when in an angry mood, one particular insult hurt Greig deeply: "If it wasn't for football you'd be nothing but a shit plumber". (Greig worked as a plumber at a time when footballers had occupations outside of football).

It was not until a meeting at club secretary Ron Joseph's office had been arranged that an agreement between the now ex-captain and coach was reached. As Greig recalled:

I told Barassi if he left me alone and let me do my own thing we would be OK. And that's what happened – Barass didn't speak to me for the entire 1980 season and consequently I won the best-and-fairest that year. I had been with him for seven years but by the end of '79 I had become tired of his ways.

Greig and Barassi appeared to be reconciled:

Barassi told me later that the 'shit plumber' remark was the worst thing he'd said in footy. We were never good mates, never been close, but we get along OK now. I even went to his testimonial last year, so we're fine now.

== Post-football life and honours ==
In the 1975 Birthday Honours, Greig was appointed Member of the Order of the British Empire (MBE) for services to football.

In 1992, Greig returned to North Melbourne as chairman of selectors. He is a life member of North Melbourne, and was selected in the AFL Team of the Century as a wingman. In 1996, Greig was inducted into the Australian Football Hall of Fame. He was also named on the wing in North Melbourne's Team of the Century.

In 2019, Greig was named at #2 in North Melbourne's greatest ever players at a special function to celebrate the club's 150-year anniversary. He was also present at the newly renovated Arden Street Oval when North's VFL team played for their first league game since 1985, in which Greig had played his 290th game.

== Bibliography ==
- Hutchinson, Garrie; Ross, John, eds. (1998). The Clubs: The Complete History of Every Club in the VFL/AFL. Australia: Viking. ISBN 0-670-87858-8.
- Holmesby, Russell; Main, Jim (2007). The Encyclopedia of AFL Footballers: Every AFL/VFL Player since 1897 (7th ed.). Melbourne: Bas Publishing. ISBN 9781920910785.
- Ross, John (1999). The Australian Football Hall of Fame. Australia: HarperCollinsPublishers. p. 72. ISBN 0-7322-6426-X.
