= Len Thompson =

Australian rules footballer (1947–2007)

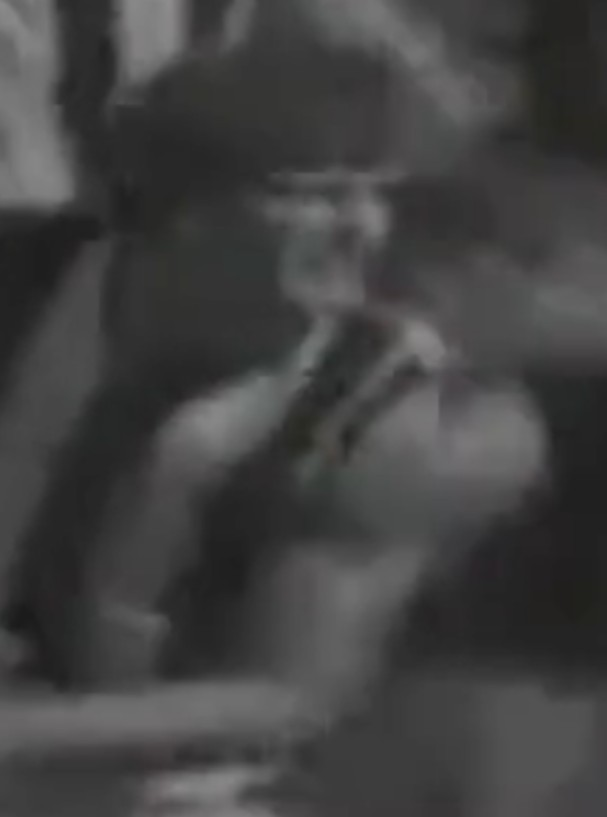
- Thompson with Collingwood in 1972

Personal information
- Full name: Leonard Ernest Thompson
- Born: 27 August 1947
- Died: 18 September 2007 (aged 60)
- Original team: North Reservoir
- Height: 199 cm (6 ft 6 in)
- Weight: 100 kg (220 lb)
- Position: Ruck/centre half forward

Playing career^{1}
Years	Club	Games (Goals)
1965–1978	Collingwood	268 (217)
1979	South Melbourne	20 (39)
1980	Fitzroy	13 (19)
Total		301 (275)

Representative team honours
Years	Team	Games (Goals)
	Victoria	15 (12)
- ^{1} Playing statistics correct to the end of 1980.

Career highlights
- Brownlow Medal 1972; 5× Copeland Trophy 1967, 1968, 1972, 1973, 1977; Collingwood captain 1978; All-Australian team 1972; Collingwood Team of the Century (First ruck); Australian Football Hall of Fame, inducted 1998

Leonard Ernest Thompson (27 August 1947 – 18 September 2007) was an Australian rules footballer who played for Collingwood, South Melbourne and Fitzroy in the Victorian Football League (VFL). He was the 1972 Brownlow Medallist and won Collingwood's best-and-fairest award on five separate occasions.

== Career ==
Originally from North Reservoir, Thompson was first rejected by Essendon before being recruited by Collingwood. Thompson was one of the first 6 foot 6 ruckman to enter the VFL scene. He was a tall and gangly teenager when he played his first senior game.

A ruckman, Thompson won five best and fairest awards during his time with Collingwood as well as one Brownlow Medal in 1972.

In the lead-up to the 1970 VFL season, Thompson and Collingwood captain Des Tuddenham, vice captain and club captain respectively, refused to play for Collingwood, going on strike to protest at the perceived unfair salaries being paid to lure interstate players east. After a three-week stand-off, Tuddenham and Thompson returned to the club without getting what they had asked, but their actions had resulted in improved pay for other players. The Collingwood committee responded by stripping Tuddenham and Thompson of their official leadership roles, with Terry Waters being appointed captain. While this protest resulted in temporary souring the relationship between Thompson and the Collingwood football club, Thompson returned to a leadership position quickly, as vice-captain from 1973 to 1977 and captain in 1978.

Thompson left Collingwood in 1979 and played one season each with South Melbourne and Fitzroy.

Thompson represented Victoria 15 times during his career. He was selected as an All-Australian at the 1972 Perth Carnival.

== Post-VFL career ==
Thompson served on the Collingwood board in 1982 and 1983.

In 1989, Thompson coached Preston in the Victorian Football Association (VFA) for one season.

In 1996, Thompson was selected as the ruckman in Collingwood's Team of the Century.

In 1999, Thompson sold his Brownlow Medal for $75,000.

On 18 September 2007, Thompson died at the home of his former partner after a heart attack. He was survived by six children – Kari-Anne, Nicolas, Sam, Lachlan, Laura and Emily – and former partners Julie, Susi and Bronwyn. Thompson's funeral took place at Melbourne's St Paul's Cathedral on 25 September 2007.
