= 1977 VFL season =

81st season of the Victorian Football League (VFL)

1977 VFL premiership season
- Teams: 12
- Premiers: North Melbourne; 2nd premiership
- Minor premiers: Collingwood; 17th minor premiership
- Night series: Hawthorn; 1st Night series win
- Brownlow Medallist: Graham Teasdale (South Melbourne)
- Coleman Medallist: Peter Hudson (Hawthorn)

Attendance
- Matches played: 139
- Total attendance: 3,304,221 (23,771 per match)
- Highest: 108,224

The 1977 VFL season was the 81st season of the Victorian Football League (VFL), the highest level senior Australian rules football competition in Victoria. The season featured twelve clubs, ran from 2 April until 1 October, and comprised a 22-game home-and-away season followed by a finals series featuring the top five clubs.

The premiership was won by the North Melbourne Football Club for the second time, after it defeated Collingwood by 27 points in the 1977 VFL Grand Final replay.

== Night series ==
Hawthorn defeated Carlton 14.11 (95) to 11.5 (71) in the final.

== Home-and-away season ==
=== Round 1 ===
Home team	Home team score	Away team	Away team score	Venue	Crowd	Date
Melbourne	10.12 (72)	South Melbourne	21.15 (141)	MCG	22,049	2 April 1977
Hawthorn	13.14 (92)	North Melbourne	23.14 (152)	Princes Park	20,317	2 April 1977
Fitzroy	21.17 (143)	Richmond	18.21 (129)	Junction Oval	17,740	2 April 1977
Essendon	14.25 (109)	St Kilda	10.17 (77)	Windy Hill	17,265	2 April 1977
Collingwood	19.16 (130)	Footscray	18.11 (119)	Victoria Park	27,377	2 April 1977
Geelong	6.9 (45)	Carlton	17.21 (123)	Kardinia Park	25,317	2 April 1977

=== Round 2 ===
Home team	Home team score	Away team	Away team score	Venue	Crowd	Date
Carlton	16.17 (113)	Fitzroy	12.9 (81)	Princes Park	25,173	9 April 1977
South Melbourne	27.13 (175)	Essendon	15.8 (98)	Lake Oval	23,000	9 April 1977
North Melbourne	16.6 (102)	Collingwood	13.15 (93)	Arden Street Oval	28,073	9 April 1977
Footscray	18.8 (116)	Melbourne	12.23 (95)	Western Oval	18,295	11 April 1977
Richmond	19.6 (120)	Hawthorn	17.17 (119)	MCG	42,192	11 April 1977
St Kilda	11.17 (83)	Geelong	17.17 (119)	Moorabbin Oval	20,338	11 April 1977

=== Round 3 ===
Home team	Home team score	Away team	Away team score	Venue	Crowd	Date
Melbourne	14.18 (102)	North Melbourne	16.9 (105)	MCG	19,543	16 April 1977
Geelong	6.14 (50)	Hawthorn	15.15 (105)	Kardinia Park	19,336	16 April 1977
Collingwood	24.22 (166)	Essendon	16.19 (115)	Victoria Park	26,210	16 April 1977
Carlton	24.26 (170)	St Kilda	9.9 (63)	Princes Park	19,336	16 April 1977
South Melbourne	11.13 (79)	Richmond	13.13 (91)	Lake Oval	25,768	16 April 1977
Footscray	20.16 (136)	Fitzroy	16.12 (108)	VFL Park	17,415	16 April 1977

=== Round 4 ===
Home team	Home team score	Away team	Away team score	Venue	Crowd	Date
Essendon	19.10 (124)	Melbourne	16.24 (120)	Windy Hill	14,529	23 April 1977
North Melbourne	16.21 (117)	Footscray	12.10 (82)	Arden Street Oval	17,239	23 April 1977
St Kilda	19.20 (134)	Fitzroy	14.14 (98)	Moorabbin Oval	13,401	23 April 1977
Hawthorn	13.18 (96)	Carlton	12.11 (83)	Princes Park	32,135	23 April 1977
Richmond	14.16 (100)	Collingwood	17.24 (126)	MCG	91,936	25 April 1977
South Melbourne	12.15 (87)	Geelong	16.18 (114)	VFL Park	27,136	25 April 1977

=== Round 5 ===
Home team	Home team score	Away team	Away team score	Venue	Crowd	Date
Melbourne	13.24 (102)	Richmond	19.17 (131)	MCG	22,272	30 April 1977
Footscray	17.14 (116)	St Kilda	17.14 (116)	Western Oval	15,453	30 April 1977
Fitzroy	12.14 (86)	Hawthorn	21.16 (142)	Junction Oval	10,428	30 April 1977
Collingwood	18.16 (124)	Geelong	15.19 (109)	Victoria Park	24,281	30 April 1977
Carlton	21.8 (134)	South Melbourne	16.11 (107)	Princes Park	21,533	30 April 1977
North Melbourne	18.17 (125)	Essendon	15.15 (105)	VFL Park	22,323	30 April 1977

=== Round 6 ===
Home team	Home team score	Away team	Away team score	Venue	Crowd	Date
Hawthorn	25.41 (191)	St Kilda	16.7 (103)	Princes Park	11,918	7 May 1977
Geelong	21.17 (143)	Melbourne	13.15 (93)	Kardinia Park	17,219	7 May 1977
Essendon	13.11 (89)	Footscray	29.15 (189)	Windy Hill	19,399	7 May 1977
Richmond	19.15 (129)	North Melbourne	14.12 (96)	MCG	34,408	7 May 1977
South Melbourne	21.19 (145)	Fitzroy	19.12 (126)	Lake Oval	11,802	7 May 1977
Collingwood	22.20 (152)	Carlton	7.8 (50)	VFL Park	64,256	7 May 1977

=== Round 7 ===
Home team	Home team score	Away team	Away team score	Venue	Crowd	Date
St Kilda	14.14 (98)	South Melbourne	14.14 (98)	Moorabbin Oval	18,563	14 May 1977
Footscray	8.13 (61)	Hawthorn	20.11 (131)	Western Oval	17,935	14 May 1977
North Melbourne	23.11 (149)	Geelong	12.12 (84)	Arden Street Oval	17,259	14 May 1977
Fitzroy	11.14 (80)	Collingwood	15.23 (113)	Junction Oval	20,735	14 May 1977
Melbourne	14.12 (96)	Carlton	16.20 (116)	MCG	27,456	14 May 1977
Essendon	15.9 (99)	Richmond	14.15 (99)	VFL Park	32,326	14 May 1977

=== Round 8 ===
Home team	Home team score	Away team	Away team score	Venue	Crowd	Date
Collingwood	19.21 (135)	St Kilda	11.12 (78)	Victoria Park	21,598	21 May 1977
Carlton	8.17 (65)	North Melbourne	9.8 (62)	Princes Park	22,364	21 May 1977
South Melbourne	7.13 (55)	Hawthorn	18.7 (115)	Lake Oval	11,443	21 May 1977
Richmond	16.18 (114)	Footscray	13.17 (95)	MCG	21,519	21 May 1977
Geelong	13.16 (94)	Essendon	13.9 (87)	Kardinia Park	15,674	21 May 1977
Melbourne	19.26 (140)	Fitzroy	14.8 (92)	VFL Park	11,259	21 May 1977

=== Round 9 ===
Home team	Home team score	Away team	Away team score	Venue	Crowd	Date
St Kilda	18.19 (127)	Melbourne	20.12 (132)	Moorabbin Oval	15,254	28 May 1977
South Melbourne	14.14 (98)	Footscray	11.13 (79)	Lake Oval	12,104	28 May 1977
North Melbourne	12.12 (84)	Fitzroy	10.14 (74)	Arden Street Oval	8,940	28 May 1977
Hawthorn	16.12 (108)	Collingwood	22.10 (142)	Princes Park	34,727	28 May 1977
Essendon	14.12 (96)	Carlton	10.17 (77)	Windy Hill	23,224	28 May 1977
Richmond	18.13 (121)	Geelong	10.11 (71)	VFL Park	26,007	28 May 1977

=== Round 10 ===
Home team	Home team score	Away team	Away team score	Venue	Crowd	Date
Footscray	21.14 (140)	Geelong	15.13 (103)	Western Oval	15,093	4 June 1977
Collingwood	15.20 (110)	South Melbourne	20.16 (136)	Victoria Park	24,309	4 June 1977
Carlton	16.9 (105)	Richmond	19.11 (125)	Princes Park	28,556	4 June 1977
Melbourne	16.19 (115)	Hawthorn	19.13 (127)	MCG	21,586	4 June 1977
Fitzroy	14.16 (100)	Essendon	23.16 (154)	Junction Oval	13,150	4 June 1977
North Melbourne	21.16 (142)	St Kilda	7.15 (57)	VFL Park	19,199	4 June 1977

=== Round 11 ===
Home team	Home team score	Away team	Away team score	Venue	Crowd	Date
South Melbourne	12.9 (81)	North Melbourne	9.11 (65)	Lake Oval	20,785	11 June 1977
Geelong	20.13 (133)	Fitzroy	11.16 (82)	Kardinia Park	14,664	11 June 1977
Carlton	17.14 (116)	Footscray	8.19 (67)	VFL Park	25,745	11 June 1977
St Kilda	13.10 (88)	Richmond	16.5 (101)	Moorabbin Oval	23,979	13 June 1977
Hawthorn	23.25 (163)	Essendon	8.9 (57)	Princes Park	25,609	13 June 1977
Melbourne	11.20 (86)	Collingwood	17.17 (119)	MCG	63,188	13 June 1977

=== Round 12 ===
Home team	Home team score	Away team	Away team score	Venue	Crowd	Date
Carlton	3.13 (31)	Geelong	2.12 (24)	Princes Park	11,009	18 June 1977
South Melbourne	8.22 (70)	Melbourne	9.10 (64)	Lake Oval	20,785	18 June 1977
North Melbourne	6.11 (47)	Hawthorn	6.12 (48)	Arden Street Oval	9,027	18 June 1977
Richmond	13.15 (93)	Fitzroy	6.5 (41)	MCG	12,877	18 June 1977
Footscray	5.6 (36)	Collingwood	9.15 (69)	Western Oval	11,921	18 June 1977
St Kilda	5.12 (42)	Essendon	5.16 (46)	VFL Park	14,337	18 June 1977

=== Round 13 ===
Home team	Home team score	Away team	Away team score	Venue	Crowd	Date
Geelong	11.9 (75)	St Kilda	12.13 (85)	Kardinia Park	13,033	25 June 1977
Essendon	9.9 (63)	South Melbourne	6.15 (51)	Windy Hill	16,309	25 June 1977
Collingwood	13.19 (97)	North Melbourne	8.8 (56)	Victoria Park	28,079	25 June 1977
Melbourne	7.9 (51)	Footscray	15.12 (102)	MCG	12,566	25 June 1977
Fitzroy	11.9 (75)	Carlton	9.14 (68)	Junction Oval	10,850	25 June 1977
Hawthorn	9.12 (66)	Richmond	7.10 (52)	VFL Park	34,820	25 June 1977

=== Round 14 ===
Home team	Home team score	Away team	Away team score	Venue	Crowd	Date
Geelong	7.15 (57)	South Melbourne	9.10 (64)	Kardinia Park	14,933	2 July 1977
Footscray	9.10 (64)	North Melbourne	11.15 (81)	Western Oval	17,151	2 July 1977
Collingwood	22.9 (141)	Richmond	11.12 (78)	Victoria Park	32,833	2 July 1977
Carlton	9.8 (62)	Hawthorn	7.6 (48)	Princes Park	24,520	2 July 1977
Melbourne	9.16 (70)	Essendon	8.11 (59)	MCG	21,473	2 July 1977
Fitzroy	10.12 (72)	St Kilda	14.12 (96)	VFL Park	17,028	2 July 1977

=== Round 15 ===
Home team	Home team score	Away team	Away team score	Venue	Crowd	Date
Fitzroy	15.13 (103)	Footscray	11.19 (85)	Junction Oval	8,680	9 July 1977
North Melbourne	18.19 (127)	Melbourne	11.10 (76)	Arden Street Oval	11,253	9 July 1977
Hawthorn	28.23 (191)	Geelong	13.6 (84)	Princes Park	21,391	9 July 1977
Essendon	14.19 (103)	Collingwood	17.12 (114)	Windy Hill	27,042	9 July 1977
St Kilda	17.12 (114)	Carlton	18.14 (122)	Moorabbin Oval	8,120	9 July 1977
Richmond	14.16 (100)	South Melbourne	10.11 (71)	VFL Park	34,291	9 July 1977

=== Round 16 ===
Home team	Home team score	Away team	Away team score	Venue	Crowd	Date
Essendon	17.14 (116)	North Melbourne	11.11 (77)	Windy Hill	17,489	16 July 1977
Richmond	10.11 (71)	Melbourne	13.12 (90)	MCG	19,075	16 July 1977
St Kilda	10.16 (76)	Footscray	13.18 (96)	Moorabbin Oval	12,659	16 July 1977
Hawthorn	20.14 (134)	Fitzroy	11.12 (78)	Princes Park	8,200	16 July 1977
South Melbourne	12.4 (76)	Carlton	13.7 (85)	Lake Oval	17,058	16 July 1977
Geelong	16.6 (102)	Collingwood	12.25 (97)	VFL Park	26,029	16 July 1977

=== Round 17 ===
Home team	Home team score	Away team	Away team score	Venue	Crowd	Date
North Melbourne	15.11 (101)	Richmond	14.14 (98)	Arden Street Oval	15,359	23 July 1977
Fitzroy	7.13 (55)	South Melbourne	16.21 (117)	Junction Oval	10,220	23 July 1977
Carlton	11.8 (74)	Collingwood	15.16 (106)	Princes Park	38,220	23 July 1977
Melbourne	15.18 (108)	Geelong	20.14 (134)	MCG	15,890	23 July 1977
Footscray	12.21 (93)	Essendon	11.10 (76)	Western Oval	17,834	23 July 1977
St Kilda	11.11 (77)	Hawthorn	24.19 (163)	VFL Park	20,469	23 July 1977

=== Round 18 ===
Home team	Home team score	Away team	Away team score	Venue	Crowd	Date
Geelong	6.15 (51)	North Melbourne	14.11 (95)	Kardinia Park	17,898	30 July 1977
Collingwood	18.14 (122)	Fitzroy	13.11 (89)	Victoria Park	16,885	30 July 1977
South Melbourne	21.12 (138)	St Kilda	12.11 (83)	Lake Oval	13,906	30 July 1977
Hawthorn	18.10 (118)	Footscray	15.14 (104)	Princes Park	10,420	30 July 1977
Richmond	16.15 (111)	Essendon	9.11 (65)	MCG	33,085	30 July 1977
Carlton	17.11 (113)	Melbourne	7.4 (46)	VFL Park	18,852	30 July 1977

=== Round 19 ===
Home team	Home team score	Away team	Away team score	Venue	Crowd	Date
Footscray	19.15 (129)	Richmond	15.11 (101)	Western Oval	16,897	6 August 1977
Fitzroy	23.8 (146)	Melbourne	12.12 (84)	Junction Oval	7,475	6 August 1977
Essendon	15.20 (110)	Geelong	18.16 (124)	Windy Hill	13,664	6 August 1977
St Kilda	11.9 (75)	Collingwood	14.17 (101)	Moorabbin Oval	21,876	6 August 1977
North Melbourne	8.15 (63)	Carlton	6.7 (43)	Arden Street Oval	22,160	6 August 1977
Hawthorn	10.18 (78)	South Melbourne	16.7 (103)	VFL Park	31,253	6 August 1977

=== Round 20 ===
Home team	Home team score	Away team	Away team score	Venue	Crowd	Date
Melbourne	27.13 (175)	St Kilda	15.14 (104)	MCG	12,967	13 August 1977
Geelong	5.16 (46)	Richmond	19.18 (132)	Kardinia Park	17,081	13 August 1977
Footscray	9.19 (73)	South Melbourne	14.12 (96)	Western Oval	18,514	13 August 1977
Collingwood	13.21 (99)	Hawthorn	15.15 (105)	Victoria Park	30,184	13 August 1977
Carlton	22.14 (146)	Essendon	16.15 (111)	Princes Park	20,120	13 August 1977
Fitzroy	9.11 (65)	North Melbourne	10.19 (79)	VFL Park	12,350	13 August 1977

=== Round 21 ===
Home team	Home team score	Away team	Away team score	Venue	Crowd	Date
Hawthorn	16.14 (110)	Melbourne	14.15 (99)	Princes Park	8,850	20 August 1977
Essendon	10.13 (73)	Fitzroy	20.17 (137)	Windy Hill	10,180	20 August 1977
St Kilda	11.12 (78)	North Melbourne	15.16 (106)	Moorabbin Oval	11,506	20 August 1977
South Melbourne	8.9 (57)	Collingwood	12.17 (89)	Lake Oval	29,186	20 August 1977
Richmond	15.13 (103)	Carlton	14.16 (100)	MCG	49,134	20 August 1977
Geelong	10.8 (68)	Footscray	11.19 (85)	VFL Park	11,010	20 August 1977

=== Round 22 ===
Home team	Home team score	Away team	Away team score	Venue	Crowd	Date
Richmond	25.21 (171)	St Kilda	17.10 (112)	MCG	24,122	27 August 1977
North Melbourne	14.9 (93)	South Melbourne	15.13 (103)	Arden Street Oval	19,102	27 August 1977
Fitzroy	19.27 (141)	Geelong	14.16 (100)	Junction Oval	7,644	27 August 1977
Essendon	19.16 (130)	Hawthorn	25.18 (168)	Windy Hill	14,325	27 August 1977
Footscray	15.13 (103)	Carlton	12.13 (85)	Western Oval	22,426	27 August 1977
Collingwood	17.13 (115)	Melbourne	14.17 (101)	VFL Park	36,306	27 August 1977

== Ladder ==
(P)	Premiers
	Qualified for finals

#	Team	P	W	L	D	PF	PA	%	Pts
1	Collingwood	22	18	4	0	2560	1959	130.7	72
2	Hawthorn	22	17	5	0	2618	1959	133.6	68
3	North Melbourne (P)	22	15	7	0	2124	1803	117.8	60
4	Richmond	22	14	7	1	2370	2085	113.7	58
5	South Melbourne	22	13	8	1	2148	1942	110.6	54
6	Carlton	22	13	9	0	2081	1859	111.9	52
7	Footscray	22	10	11	1	2170	2141	101.4	42
8	Geelong	22	8	14	0	1930	2333	82.7	32
9	Essendon	22	7	14	1	2085	2518	82.8	30
10	Fitzroy	22	6	16	0	2072	2474	83.8	24
11	Melbourne	22	5	17	0	2117	2492	85.0	20
12	St Kilda	22	3	17	2	1966	2676	73.5	16

Rules for classification: 1. premiership points; 2. percentage; 3. points for
Average score: 99.4
Source: AFL Tables

== Finals series ==
=== Finals week 1 ===
Elimination final
3 September 2:30pm	Richmond	def.	South Melbourne	VFL Park (crowd: 63,663)
5.4 (34); 7.6 (48); 11.8 (74); 13.10 (88)	Q1; Q2; Q3; Final	2.3 (15); 6.7 (43); 6.10 (46); 7.12 (54)	Umpires: Deller, Smith; Television broadcast: Seven Network
Edwards, Monteath, Cloke, Dunne 2 Malthouse, Noonan, Bartlett, Raines, Roberts 1	Goals	2 Lambert; 1 Goss, Browning, Teasdale, Daniher, Morrison
Bourke, Cloke, Bartlett, Malthouse, Monteath, Sheedy, Edwards	Best	Round, McLeish, Browning, Morrison, Rantall, O'Neill, Teasdale

Home team	Score	Away team	Score	Venue	Crowd	Date
Hawthorn	19.11 (125)	North Melbourne	12.15 (87)	MCG	64,068	3 September

=== Finals week 2 ===
Home team	Score	Away team	Score	Venue	Crowd	Date
North Melbourne	16.14 (110)	Richmond	9.9 (63)	VFL Park	48,105	10 September
Collingwood	17.10 (112)	Hawthorn	16.14 (110)	MCG	87,421	10 September

=== Preliminary final ===
Home team	Score	Away team	Score	Venue	Crowd	Date
Hawthorn	5.15 (45)	North Melbourne	16.16 (112)	VFL Park	61,242	17 September

=== Grand final ===
Game	Home team	Home team score	Away team	Away team score	Venue	Crowd	Date
Grand final	Collingwood	9.22 (76)	North Melbourne	10.16 (76)	MCG	108,224	24 September 1977

=== Grand final replay ===
Game	Home team	Home team score	Away team	Away team score	Venue	Crowd	Date
Grand final	Collingwood	19.10 (124)	North Melbourne	21.25 (151)	MCG	98,491	1 October 1977

== Season notes ==
- In early March, following proposals dating back to 1968, the Victorian government announced the legalisation of betting on VFL football via the TAB.
- Hawthorn's round 6 victory over St Kilda set the following records – 41 behinds (previous highest 34) and 66 scoring shots (previous highest 60). 13 different Hawthorn players kicked a behind – still a VFL/AFL record.
- In shocking conditions in round 12, Carlton and Geelong played the first match since the 1927 Grand Final in which both teams scored three or fewer goals. Both teams' scores were lower than any score from any other game during 1977. In the same round, North Melbourne's Malcolm Blight missed a set shot for goal after the final siren at the Arden Street Oval, which resulted in Hawthorn winning the game.
- In the round 15 game against Geelong, Hawthorn had three players – Hudson with eight, John Hendrie with eight, and Leigh Matthews with seven – kick seven or more goals in one match. This has been repeated only by Fitzroy with Matthew Rendell, Bernie Quinlan and Michael Conlan in 1983 against North Melbourne.
- In round 16, Geelong 16.6 (102) beat Collingwood 12.25 (97) despite having fifteen fewer scoring shots. This equalled Richmond's record against Fitzroy from 1957.
- For the only time in VFL/AFL history, two players from one team – Peter Hudson (110) and Leigh Matthews (91) of Hawthorn – combined for over 200 goals in one season. Additionally, it was the first time since 1906 that one club produced the top two leading goalkickers in a season.
- In the reserves and under-19 Grades, the appalling weather of mid-to-late June resulted in the cancellations of round 14 of the reserves season and round 13 of the under-19s season. It was the first time ever, in any VFL grade, that scheduled matches had been cancelled (rather than postponed), and remained the only time until 2015.
- South Melbourne played in its last finals series before relocating to Sydney, as well as its first final series since 1970, and only its second since the infamous 1945 "bloodbath" grand final.
- St Kilda "won" its nineteenth wooden spoon and first since 1955. With the club having finished last 27 times since 1897, this twenty-two year gap is the longest between spoons for the club.
- Collingwood became the first VFL/AFL team to win the minor premiership after winning the wooden spoon the year before.

== Awards ==
- The Coleman Medal was won by Peter Hudson of Hawthorn with 105 goals
- The Brownlow Medal was won by Graham Teasdale of South Melbourne.
- The under 19s premiership was won by Richmond. Richmond 9.23 (77) defeated Fitzroy 7.12 (54) in the grand final, held as a curtain-raiser to the reserves grand final at the Melbourne Cricket Ground on 24 September
- The reserves premiership was won by Richmond. Richmond 19.18 (132) defeated Footscray 10.15 (75) in the grand final, held as a curtain-raiser to the seniors grand final at the Melbourne Cricket Ground on 24 September.

== Sources ==
- 1977 VFL season at AFL Tables
- 1977 VFL season at Australian Football
