= Gary Hardeman =

Australian rules footballer (born 1950)

Personal information
- Born: 26 February 1950 (age 76)
- Original teams: St Peters, East Bentleigh. Moorabbin Technical School
- Height: 187 cm (6 ft 2 in)
- Weight: 90 kg (198 lb)

Playing career^{1}
Years	Club	Games (Goals)
1967–77, 1981	Melbourne	219 (113)
- ^{1} Playing statistics correct to the end of 1981.

Career highlights
- Melbourne Team of the Century–centre half-back; Melbourne Hall of Fame; All-Australian: 1972; Brownlow Medal: Runner-Up 1974

Gary Hardeman (born 26 February 1950) is a former Australian rules footballer who played for Melbourne in the Victorian Football League (VFL) between the late 1960s and early 1980s.

Hardeman played as a half back and made his senior debut for Melbourne in the 1967 VFL season. He remained with the club until 1977, finishing second in the 1974 Brownlow Medal count and earning All Australian selection for his performance in the 1972 Perth Carnival. After leaving the club at the end of 1977 Hardeman joined Sturt in the South Australian National Football League (SANFL) but returned to Melbourne in 1981 to play for one final season.

Hardeman is only one of four footballers, with Trevor Barker, Geoff Cunningham and Steven Smith, to have played 200 VFL/AFL games but not play a final.

In 2000, he was selected at centre half back in Melbourne's official 'Team of the Century'.

== Statistics ==
Legend
G	Goals	K	Kicks	D	Disposals	T	Tackles
B	Behinds	H	Handballs	M	Marks

Season	Team	No.	Games	Totals							Averages (per game)						
Season	Team	No.	Games	G	B	K	H	D	M	T	G	B	K	H	D	M	T
1967	Melbourne	33	8	1	2	76	13	89	13	—N/a	0.1	0.3	9.5	1.6	11.1	1.6	—N/a
1968	Melbourne	33	17	21	19	168	25	193	48	—N/a	1.2	1.1	9.9	1.5	11.4	2.8	—N/a
1969	Melbourne	33	19	15	13	248	64	312	62	—N/a	0.8	0.7	13.1	3.4	16.4	3.3	—N/a
1970	Melbourne	33	22	1	4	337	34	371	96	—N/a	0.0	0.2	15.3	1.5	16.9	4.4	—N/a
1971	Melbourne	33	20	0	1	280	42	322	95	—N/a	0.0	0.1	14.0	2.1	16.1	4.8	—N/a
1972	Melbourne	33	21	10	6	335	56	391	124	—N/a	0.5	0.3	16.0	2.7	18.6	5.9	—N/a
1973	Melbourne	33	21	6	7	272	63	335	98	—N/a	0.3	0.3	13.0	3.0	16.0	4.7	—N/a
1974	Melbourne	33	20	11	15	289	100	389	91	—N/a	0.6	0.8	14.5	5.0	19.5	4.6	—N/a
1975	Melbourne	33	21	31	27	288	93	381	70	—N/a	1.5	1.4	14.4	4.7	19.1	3.5	—N/a
1976	Melbourne	33	20	7	7	279	88	367	75	—N/a	0.4	0.4	14.0	4.4	18.4	3.8	—N/a
1977	Melbourne	33	21	10	4	276	118	394	87	—N/a	0.5	0.2	13.1	5.6	18.8	4.1	—N/a
1981	Melbourne	11	9	0	0	79	62	141	35	—N/a	0.0	0.0	8.8	6.9	15.7	3.9	—N/a
Career			219	113	105	2927	758	3685	894	—N/a	0.5	0.5	13.4	3.5	16.9	4.1	—N/a
