= List of Fitzroy Football Club seasons =

This is a list of coaches and captains of the Fitzroy Football Club, along with best and fairest award winners and leading goalkickers, for every year of the club's participation in the Victorian Football Association (VFA), Victorian/Australian Football League (VFL/AFL) and the Victorian Amateur Football Association (VAFA).

From 1987 to 1996, Fitzroy's best and fairest award was known as the Mitchell Medal, named after Percy Mitchell, a long-serving club administrator and life member.

== VFA ==
=== 1884–1896 ===
Year	Finish	Coach	Captain	Best and fairest	Leading goalkicker	Goals
1884	5		Paddy McShane	J. Williams	G. Heron & E. Carew	5
1885	6		Paddy McShane		Herbert Rappaport	12
1886	5		Jack Worrall	Jack Worrall	A. Newlands	18
1887	4		Jack Worrall		Jack Worrall	16
1888	10				W. Schmidt & James Hogg	12
1889	7		Jack Worrall		Jack Worrall	24
1890	4		Jack Worrall		Jim Grace	35
1881	3		Jack Worrall		Jim Grace	49
1892	2		Jack Worrall	Tom Banks	Jim Grace	48
1893	5		Tom Banks	Tom Banks	Jim Grace	48
1894	4		Tom Banks	Tom Banks	Jim Grace	23
1895	1		Tom Banks		Jim Grace	24
1896	4		Bill Cleary	Chris Kiernan	Chris Kiernan	19

== VFL/AFL ==
=== 1897–1909 ===
Year	Finish	Coach	Captain	Best and fairest	Leading goalkicker	Goals
1897	6		Bill Cleary		Chris Kiernan	11
1898	1		Alec Sloan	Mick Grace	Chris Kiernan	18
1899	1		Alec Sloan	Pat Hickey	Bill McSpeerin	18
1900	2		Alec Sloan	Mick Grace	Chris Kiernan	21
1901	4		Bill McSpeerin		Gerald Brosnan	33
1902	3		Bill McSpeerin		Percy Trotter	22
1903	2		Gerald Brosnan	Percy Trotter	Percy Trotter	27
1904	1		Gerald Brosnan	Jim Sharp	Percy Trotter	36
1905	1		Gerald Brosnan	Les Millis	Alf Wilkinson	30
1906	2		Ern Jenkins	Les Millis	Percy Trotter	28
1907	7		Ern Jenkins	Barclay Bailes & Wally Johnson	Jim Sharp	24
1908	6		Jim Sharp	Herbert Milne & George Holden	Wally Johnson	27
1909	8		Jim Sharp	Bill Walker & George Lambert	Billy Dick	26

=== 1910–1919 ===
Year	Finish	Coach	Captain	Best and fairest	Leading goalkicker	Goals
1910	8		Jim Sharp	Herbert Milne	Bob Briggs	30
1911	5	Geoff Moriarty	Harold McLennan	Jack Cooper	Bruce Campbell	25
1912	5	Geoff Moriarty	Jack Cooper	Harold McLennan	Jimmy Freake	53
1913	1	Percy Parratt	Bill Walker	Harold McLennan	Jimmy Freake	56
1914	3	Percy Parratt	Percy Parratt	Jack Cooper	Jimmy Freake	47
1915	3	Percy Parratt	Percy Parratt	George Holden	Jimmy Freake	66
1916	1	George Holden	Wally Johnson		Tom Heaney	27
1917	2	George Holden	George Holden		Jimmy Freake	37
1918	5	George Holden	George Holden	Jimmy Freake	Jimmy Freake	29
1919	5	George Holden & Ted Melling	Wally Johnson		Bob Merrick	42

=== 1920–1929 ===
Year	Finish	Coach	Captain	Best and fairest	Leading goalkicker	Goals
1920	4	Percy Parratt	Percy Parratt	Len Wigraft	Bob Merrick	53
1921	5	Percy Parratt	Percy Parratt, & Chris Lethbridge	Gordon Rattray	Bob Merrick	32
1922	1	Vic Belcher	Chris Lethbridge	Jim Atkinson	Bob Merrick	47
1923	2	Vic Belcher	Gordon Rattray	Goldie Collins	Jimmy Freake	45
1924	3	Vic Belcher	Jim Atkinson	Len Wigraft	Jack Moriarty	82
1925	5	Chris Lethbridge	Jim Atkinson	Len Wigraft	Jack Moriarty	63
1926	8	Vic Belcher	Bill Adams	Horrie Jenkin	Jack Moriarty	48
1927	9	Vic Belcher	Len Wigraft	Jack Moriarty	Jack Moriarty	83
1928	8	Gordon Rattray	Gordon Rattray		Jack Moriarty	68
1929	11	Doug Ringrose	Charlie Chapman		Jack Moriarty	58

=== 1930–1939 ===
Year	Finish	Coach	Captain	Best and fairest	Leading goalkicker	Goals
1930	9	Colin Niven	Colin Niven		Charlie Chapman	46
1931	10	Colin Niven	Colin Niven		Jack Moriarty	53
1932	10	Frank Maher	Haydn Bunton Senior; Jack Sexton		Jack Moriarty	81
1933	5	Frank Maher	Jack Sexton; Jack Moriarty		Jack Moriarty	70
1934	8	Jack Cashman; Len Wigraft	Jack Cashman; Fred Davies	Haydn Bunton Senior	Len Pye	39
1935	7	Percy Rowe	Charlie Cameron	Haydn Bunton Senior	Dinny Ryan	46
1936	12	Haydn Bunton Senior	Haydn Bunton Senior	Haydn Bunton Senior	Haydn Bunton Senior	33
1937	7	Gordon Rattray	Haydn Bunton Senior		Haydn Bunton Senior	37
1938	10	Gordon Rattray	Frank Curcio		Fred Hughson	62
1939	8	Gordon Rattray	Frank Curcio		Clen Denning	37

=== 1940–1949 ===
Year	Finish	Coach	Captain	Best and fairest	Leading goalkicker	Goals
1940	7	Dan Minogue	Frank Curcio		Claude Curtin	56
1941	7	Dan Minogue	Frank Curcio		Claude Curtin	65
1942	6	Dan Minogue	Maurie Hearn		Claude Curtin	61
1943	3	Fred Hughson	Fred Hughson		Jack Grant	42
1944	1	Fred Hughson	Fred Hughson	Allan Ruthven	Allan Ruthven	46
1945	6	Fred Hughson	Fred Hughson	Allan Ruthven	Allan Ruthven	42
1946	8	Fred Hughson	Fred Hughson	Allan Ruthven	Claude Curtin	56
1947	3	Fred Hughson	Fred Hughson	Norm Johnstone	Eddie Hart	64
1948	7	Charlie Cameron	Allan Ruthven	Allan Ruthven	Eddie Hart	61
1949	7	Norm Smith	Norm Smith	Allan Ruthven	Eddie Hart	53

=== 1950–1959 ===
Year	Finish	Coach	Captain	Best and fairest	Leading goalkicker	Goals
1950	5	Norm Smith	Norm Smith; Allan Ruthven	Bill Stephen	Eddie Hart	50
1951	5	Norm Smith	Allan Ruthven	Vic Chanter	Eddie Hart	65
1952	3	Allan Ruthven	Allan Ruthven	Neville Broderick	Tony Ongarello	50
1953	6	Allan Ruthven	Allan Ruthven	Don Furness	Joe Hickey	40
1954	11	Allan Ruthven	Allan Ruthven	Bill Stephen	Allan Ruthven	31
1955	9	Bill Stephen	Bill Stephen	Don Furness	Norm Johnstone	32
1956	8	Bill Stephen	Bill Stephen	Kevin Murray	Tony Ongarello	33
1957	11	Bill Stephen	Bill Stephen	Graham Campbell	Owen Abrahams	31
1958	4	Len Smith	Alan Gale	Kevin Murray	Tony Ongarello	53
1959	5	Len Smith	Alan Gale	Ron Harvey	Kevin Wright	43

=== 1960–1969 ===
Year	Finish	Coach	Captain	Best and fairest	Leading goalkicker	Goals
1960	3	Len Smith	Alan Gale	Kevin Murray	Kevin Wright	36
1961	5	Len Smith	Alan Gale	Kevin Murray	Owen Abrahams	32
1962	10	Len Smith	Owen Abrahams	Kevin Murray	Wally Clark	21
1963	12	Kevin Murray	Kevin Murray	Kevin Murray	Gary Lazarus	35
1964	12	Kevin Murray	Kevin Murray	Kevin Murray	Ralph Rogerson	27
1965	11	Bill Stephen	Ralph Rogerson	Norm Brown	Gary Lazarus	32
1966	12	Bill Stephen	Ralph Rogerson; John Hayes	Norm Brown	Gary Lazarus	39
1967	11	Bill Stephen	Kevin Murray	Norm Brown	Gary Lazarus	35
1968	11	Bill Stephen	Kevin Murray	Kevin Murray & John Murphy	Doug Searl	31
1969	10	Bill Stephen	Kevin Murray	Kevin Murray	Doug Searl	68

=== 1970–1979 ===
Year	Finish	Coach	Captain	Best and fairest	Leading goalkicker	Goals
1970	9	Bill Stephen	Kevin Murray	John Murphy	Alex Ruscuklic	49
1971	6	Graham Donaldson	Kevin Murray	John Murphy	John Murphy	47
1972	9	Graham Donaldson	Kevin Murray	Garry Wilson	Garry Wilson	37
1973	8	Graham Donaldson	John Murphy	John Murphy	Garry Wilson	43
1974	11	Graham Donaldson; Graham Campbell	John Murphy	Harvey Merrigan	David Wall	35
1975	11	Kevin Rose	John Murphy	Warwick Irwin	Renato Serafini	34
1976	11	Kevin Rose	John Murphy	Garry Wilson	John Murphy	35
1977	10	Kevin Rose	John Murphy	John Murphy	Bob Beecroft	59
1978	9	Graham Campbell	Harvey Merrigan	Garry Wilson	Bob Beecroft	65
1979	4	Bill Stephen	Ron Alexander	Garry Wilson	Bob Beecroft	87

=== 1980–1989 ===
Year	Finish	Coach	Captain	Best and fairest	Leading goalkicker	Goals
1980	12	Bill Stephen	Ron Alexander	Garry Wilson	Bob Beecroft	63
1981	4	Robert Walls	Garry Wilson	Ron Alexander	Bernie Quinlan	73
1982	6	Robert Walls	Garry Wilson	Matt Rendell	Bernie Quinlan	53
1983	4	Robert Walls	Garry Wilson	Matt Rendell	Bernie Quinlan	116
1984	5	Robert Walls	Garry Wilson	Ross Thornton	Bernie Quinlan	105
1985	9	Robert Walls	Matt Rendell	Paul Roos	Bernie Quinlan	84
1986	3	David Parkin	Matt Rendell	Paul Roos	Richard Osborne	62
1987	11	David Parkin	Matt Rendell	Scott McIvor	Richard Osborne	62
1988	12	David Parkin	Paul Roos	Darren Kappler	Richard Osborne	60
1989	6	Rod Austin	Paul Roos	Gary Pert	Richard Osborne	68

=== 1990–1996 ===
Year	Finish	Coach	Captain	Best and fairest	Leading goalkicker	Goals
1990	12	Rod Austin	Paul Roos	Scott Clayton	Paul Roos	49
1991	14	Robert Shaw	Richard Osborne	Paul Roos	Darren Wheildon	29
1992	10	Robert Shaw	Paul Roos	Paul Roos	Richard Osborne	58
1993	11	Robert Shaw	Paul Roos	Alastair Lynch	Alastair Lynch	68
1994	14	Robert Shaw	Paul Roos	Paul Roos	Darren Wheildon	26
1995	16	Bernie Quinlan; Alan McConnell	Brad Boyd	Brad Boyd	Chris Johnson	25
1996	16	Mick Nunan; Alan McConnell	Brad Boyd	Martin Pike	Anthony Mellington	22

== VAFA ==
Premiers	Grand Finalist	Minor premiers	Finals appearance	Wooden spoon

=== 2009–present ===
Year	Division	Finish	W	L	D	Coach	Captain	Best and fairest	Coach's Award	Leading goalkicker	Goals	Ref
2009	Division 1	4th	11	7	0	Simon Taylor	James O'Reilly	Conor Dullard	Simon Kelleher	Ross Borland		
2010		7th				Simon Taylor	James O'Reilly	O. O'Connor	James O'Reilly	Ross Borland		
2011		8th				Tim Bell	James O'Reilly	James McGee	Jack Dalton	Will Pickering	59	
2012		6th				Michael Pickering	Rory Angiolella	Dom Pound-Palmieri	Joshua Vansittar			
2013						Michael Pickering; Sam Baker	Rory Angiolella	Dan Bisetto	Dylan Patcas			
2014						Michael Pickering; Will Fenton	Rory Angiolella	Matthew Kyroussis	Max Ellis			
2015						Michael Pickering; Will Fenton	Rory Angiolella	Dan Bisetto	Nick Marshall			
2016						Michael Pickering; Nick Mitchell	Rory Angiolella; Dan Bisetto	Max Ellis	Nathan Ligris			
2017	Premier B	9th	5	13	0	Nick Mitchell	Rory Angiolella	Max Ellis	Ted Clayton			
2018	Premier C	2nd	15	3	0	Luke Mahoney	Julian Turner	Max Ellis	T. O'Donnell			
2019	Premier B	7th	6	12	0	Luke Mahoney	Julian Turner	Max Ellis	Jack Hart			
2020	Premier B	(No season)				Luke Mahoney	Julian Turner	(No season)				
2021	Premier B	6th	4	7	0	Luke Mahoney	Julian Turner	Ted Clayton	Nathan Ligris			
2022	Premier B	4th	9	7	0	Luke Mahoney	Julian Turner; Jack Hart	Ted Clayton	Jock Green			
2023	Premier B	2nd	12	6	0	Luke Mahoney	Julian Turner	Donovan Toohey	Charlie Faubel			
2024	Premier					Travis Ronaldson	Jack Hart					
