= List of Fitzroy Football Club captains =

The following is a list of players who captained the Fitzroy Football Club in the Australian Football League (AFL), formerly the VFL.

Dates	Captain(s)	Notes
1897	Bill Cleary	
1898–1900	Alec Sloan	1898 premiership captain 1899 premiership captain
1901–1902	Bill McSpeerin	
1903–1905	Gerald Brosnan	1904 premiership captain 1905 premiership captain
1906–1907	Ern Jenkins	
1908–1910	Jim Sharp	
1911	Harold McLennan	
1912	Jack Cooper	
1913	Bill Walker	1913 premiership captain
1914–1915	Percy Parratt	
1916	Wally Johnson	1916 premiership captain
1917–1918	George Holden	
1919	Wally Johnson	
1920	Percy Parratt	
1921	Percy Parratt; Chris Lethbridge	
1922	Chris Lethbridge	1922 premiership captain
1923	Gordon Rattray	
1924–1925	Jim Atkinson	
1926	Bill Adams	
1927	Len Wigraft	
1928	Gordon Rattray	
1929	Charlie Chapman	
1930–1931	Colin Niven	
1932	Haydn Bunton, Sr. Jack Sexton	
1933	Jack Sexton; Jack Moriarty	
1934	Jack Cashman; Fred Davies	
1935	Charles J. Cameron	
1936–1937	Haydn Bunton, Sr.	
1938–1941	Frank Curcio	
1942	Maurie Hearn	
1943–1947	Fred Hughson	1944 premiership captain
1948	Allan Ruthven	
1949	Norm Smith	
1950	Norm Smith; Allan Ruthven	
1951–1954	Allan Ruthven	
1955–1957	Bill Stephen	
1958–1961	Alan Gale	
1962	Owen Abrahams	
1963–1964	Kevin Murray	
1965	Ralph Rogerson	
1966	Ralph Rogerson; John Hayes	
1967–1972	Kevin Murray	
1973–1977	John Murphy	
1978	Harvey Merrigan	
1979–1980	Ron Alexander	
1981–1984	Garry Wilson	
1985–1987	Matt Rendell	
1988–1990	Paul Roos	
1991	Richard Osborne	
1992–1994	Paul Roos	
1995–1996	Brad Boyd	
