= George Lambert =

George Lambert may refer to:

== Politicians ==
- George Lambert, 1st Viscount Lambert (1866–1958), British MP and peer
- George Lambert, 2nd Viscount Lambert (1909–1989), his son, also a British MP and peer
- George Lambert (Australian politician) (1879–1941), Australian politician in Western Australia
- George Lambert (American politician) (born 1968), American politician in New Hampshire

== Sportsmen ==
- George Lambert (tennis) (1842–1915), British real tennis world champion
- George Lambert (footballer) (1887–1938), Australian footballer, played for Fitzroy Football Club
- George Lambert (cricketer) (1919–1991), English cricketer
- George Lambert (pentathlete) (1928–2012), American Olympic modern pentathlete

== Others ==
- George Lambert (English painter) (1700–1765), English landscape painter
- George Jackson Lambert (1794–1880), English organist
- George Lambert (Royal Navy officer) (1796–1869), British admiral
- George Lambert (VC) (1819–1860), Irish recipient of the Victoria Cross
- George Washington Lambert (1873–1930), Australian painter
- George Lambert (baritone) (1900–1971), English baritone mainly active in Canada
