= Haydn Bunton Sr. =

Australian rules footballer (1911–1955)

- Bunton in 1938

Personal information
- Full name: Haydn William Bunton
- Born: 5 July 1911; Albury, New South Wales
- Died: 5 September 1955 (aged 44); Adelaide, South Australia
- Original teams: Albury Rovers, Albury, West Albury
- Height: 179 cm (5 ft 10 in)
- Weight: 73 kg (161 lb)
- Position: Rover

Playing career^{1}
Years	Club	Games (Goals)
1931–1937, 1942	Fitzroy	119 (207)
1938–1941	Subiaco	72 (190)
1945	Port Adelaide	17 (30)
Total		208 (427)

Representative team honours
Years	Team	Games (Goals)
1931–1937	Victoria	12
1938–1939	Western Australia	

Coaching career^{3}
Years	Club	Games (W–L–D)
1936	Fitzroy	18 (2–16–0)
1947–1948	North Adelaide	35 (13–21–0)
- ^{1} Playing statistics correct to the end of 1945.^{3} Coaching statistics correct as of 1948.

Career highlights
- VFL: 3× Brownlow Medal: 1931, 1932, 1935; Fitzroy captain: 1932, 1936–1937; 2× Fitzroy leading goalkicker: 1936, 1937; 2× Fitzroy Club Champion: 1934, 1935; WAFL: 3× Sandover Medal: 1938, 1939, 1941; Subiaco captain: 1938–1939, 1941; Subiaco Leading goalkicker: 1938, 1939, 1940, 1941; Subiaco Best & Fairest: 1938, 1939, 1941; SANFL: Played in 1945 SANFL Grand Final; Honours: Australian Football Hall of Fame (legend status); AFL Team of the Century (forward pocket); New South Wales – Team of the Century (rover); New South Wales – NSW Greatest Team of all Time; Fitzroy team of the century (rover); Subiaco team of the century (ruck-rover); Ovens & Murray Football League Hall of Fame; 2 x premiership player: Albury Rovers, 1926 & 1927; 1 x premiership player: Albury, 1928; 1 x premiership player: West Albury, 1929

Haydn William Bunton (5 July 1911 – 5 September 1955) was an Australian rules footballer who represented Fitzroy in the Victorian Football League (VFL), Subiaco in the West Australian Football League (WAFL), and Port Adelaide in the South Australian National Football League (SANFL) during the 1930s and 1940s.

Bunton is the only footballer to have won the Brownlow Medal and the Sandover Medal three times each. He is one of only four footballers to have won the Brownlow three times (the others being Ian Stewart, Dick Reynolds and Bob Skilton), and one of only five footballers to have won the Sandover Medal at least three times (the others being Bill Walker, who won it four times; and Barry Cable, Graham Farmer and Merv McIntosh, who each won it three times). Bunton is also the only player to have averaged one Brownlow vote per game over the course of a completed career, averaging 1.04 votes per game.

Like cricketer Don Bradman and the racehorse Phar Lap, Bunton was a sporting champion who made life bearable for the Australian public during the dark days of the Great Depression. He was regarded by some historians and observers of Australian rules as its greatest-ever player.

== Early life ==
The son of Victorians Ernest Edward Bunton, a brickmaker, and Matilda Caroline, née Luhrs, Bunton was born and raised in Albury, New South Wales.

As a young teenager, Bunton excelled in Australian rules football, cricket, swimming, and athletics, creating many records in a number of different sports.

== Playing career ==
=== Albury Rovers/Albury/West Albury Football Clubs (1923–1930) ===
Bunton began playing for the Albury Rovers Football Club as a 12-year-old in 1923 and twice won the league's best-and-fairest award. After winning premierships with Albury Rovers in 1926 & 1927, he moved across to the Albury Football Club, although Bunton had earlier made his debut for the Albury Football Club in 1924 in the Ovens and Murray Football League as a 13-year-old boy.

He played for the Albury Rovers Football Club in 1926 and 1927 in the Albury and Border Football Association and kicked 4 goals in their 1926 grand final win as a 15-year-old and also played in their 1927 premiership win. He also won the club's best-and-fairest award in both 1926 and 1927.

In June 1928, the Victorian Football League played a match against the Ovens and Murray Football League in Wangaratta, and 16-year-old Hayden Bunton was praised after the game by VFL captain Frank Maher as "being able to hold his own in any league team".

In 1928, Bunton was best on ground for the Albury Football Club in their Ovens and Murray Football League grand final win against St. Patrick's FC. Bunton won the club's best and fairest award in 1928 too.

In 1929, there were two Albury based teams in the Ovens and Murray Football League (East Albury & West Albury) and Bunton played for the West Albury Football Club in their 1929 Ovens and Murray Football League premiership side against East Albury and once again he was best on ground in the grand final.

It was at this point after starring in four consecutive senior football premierships, that his natural Australian football ability attracted the attention of all twelve VFL clubs.

In early 1930, Bunton was treated to a farewell dinner in the Albury Town Hall, after signing with the Fitzroy Cricket Club and Fitzroy Football Club.

Shortly after Fitzroy had won the race to secure his services, it was revealed that they had paid him £222 (A$18,750 in 2020 terms) to join, which was illegal under VFL rules. He was subsequently disqualified for 12 months by the Victorian Football League's Permit Committee and unable to play during the 1930 VFL season for the Fitzroy Football Club despite several appeals. Bunton later claimed in a 1950 newspaper article that he had received the money for a knee operation after he tore his cartilage in the 1930 Ovens and Murray Football League grand final. His initial legal match payments were the modest sum of £2 (A$168 in 2020 terms) per week.

He resisted offers from clubs in the Victorian Football Association (VFA) to play for them during the 1930 season, one club even offering him a brand-new car.

After finally receiving a permit to play back in the Ovens and Murray Football League for West Albury Football Club in June 1930, Bunton was appointed captain/coach and later played in his fifth consecutive grand final. The match was against the Hume Weir Football Club who proved too good and defeated West Albury for the premiership. Bunton once again played a starring role up until just before half time when he injured his knee and took no further part in the match.

=== Fitzroy (1931–1937) ===
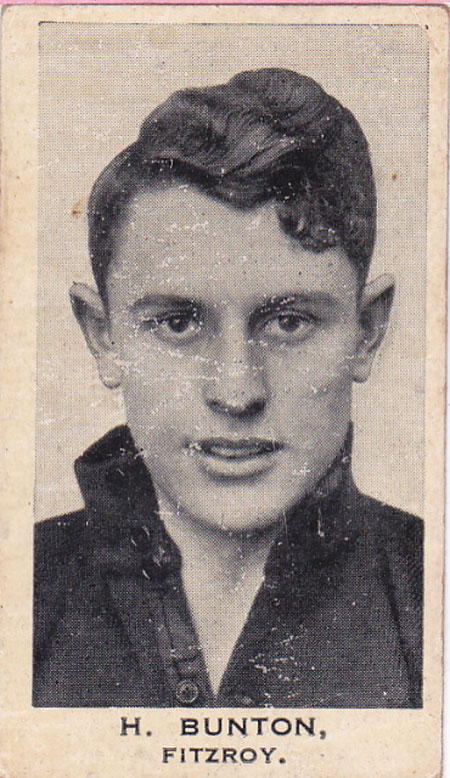
1934 cigarette card featuring Bunton

In April, 1931 Bunton was cleared to the Fitzroy Football Club from the West Albury Football Club and his clearance was finally approved by the Victorian Football League's Permit Committee.

Bunton finally made his much anticipated VFL debut in round one of the 1931 VFL season against Melbourne Football Club at the Melbourne Cricket Ground, kicking one goal in a losing team.

Bunton played as a rover/follower and achieved instant success, winning Brownlow Medals in his first two seasons (1931 and 1932) in the VFL. He worked in a department store during the day, and practised baulking by weaving his way through crowds of shoppers. One of his opponents, Dick Reynolds, spied on him during this activity in order to learn how to defeat his technique.

During his career at Fitzroy, Bunton won five club best-and-fairest awards, in addition to his Brownlows. He was appointed captain of Fitzroy in 1932. He was runner-up for the Brownlow Medal in 1934 before winning the award for a third and final time in 1935. While playing, Bunton also spent the 1936 VFL season as senior coach at Fitzroy, but could only manage two wins. He was also Fitzroy's leading goalkicker in 1936 and 1937.

=== Subiaco (1938–1941) ===
In 1938, Bunton moved to Western Australia, taking the position of captain/coach of Subiaco; while very competitive, they failed to play finals during his coaching stints of 1938, 1939 and 1941.

Bunton captained the Western Australian team to a victory against St.Kilda Football Club in July, 1938.

He won the Sandover Medal three times, in 1938, 1939 and 1941, Bunton polled 17 votes in the 1940 Sandover Medal, finishing in 6th position.

Altogether, Bunton had won six league best and fairest awards in only eleven seasons between the two states in which he had played.

=== Return to Fitzroy (1942) ===
Corporal Haydn Bunton returned to Melbourne from Perth to enter the Army's Physical Training School at Frankston and was accompanied by four Fitzroy Football Club recruits from Western Australian in April, 1942.

Bunton returned to his Army unit in Perth in late May, 1942.

He managed to play only two games for Fitzroy Football Club in rounds one and three of 1942 VFL season, due to his Army commitments.

=== Army/Services Football (1943 & 44) ===
Bunton played in the 18-team Services Football competition in Perth, which was divided into a 10-team A-grade competition and 8-team B-Grade competition.

=== Port Adelaide (1945) ===
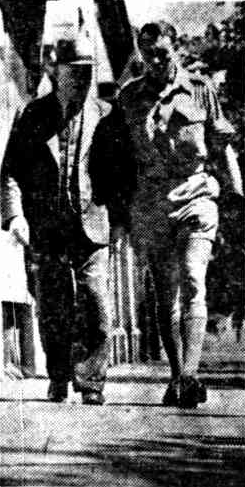
Left: Port Adelaide secretary Charles Hayter (left) in discussion with Haydn Bunton (right) in 1945.
Right: Caricature by Lionel Coventry from May 1945 upon the news of the star joining Port Adelaide.

After being discharged from army service at the end of World War II at the age of 33, he joined Port Adelaide in the SANFL league and played 17 games during the 1945 SANFL season. Bunton would form a formidable duo with Bob Quinn, helping Port Adelaide attract record crowds for the season. At the end of the minor round, Port Adelaide had lost only two games, finishing up with a percentage of 133. Bunton would play in the first final of his career with Port Adelaide in their Second Semi-Final win against Norwood in front of 36,383 spectators at Adelaide Oval. Bunton would kick two goals during the match. The win against Norwood qualified Port Adelaide for the 1945 SANFL Grand Final against West Torrens. During the first quarter of the 1945 SANFL Grand Final, Port Adelaide kicked a record quarter-time score for a SANFL Grand Final of 8.1 (51), which still stands today. However, this was not enough for Bunton to win his first premiership as a player with Port Adelaide, falling short by 13 points to West Torrens. The 1945 SANFL Grand Final would be Haydn Bunton Sr's last match in senior football. Bunton would be awarded two Magarey Medal votes during his 17 games for Port Adelaide in 1945, thus achieving the rare feat of garnering votes in the VFL, WAFL, and SANFL.

== North Adelaide (1947 & 1948) ==
On Monday, 3 March 1947, the North Adelaide Football Club appointed Haydn Bunton as senior non-playing coach. North Adelaide finished in 6th position in 1947 and in 5th position in 1948. Bunton resigned as coach after the last home-and-away game in September 1948. North Adelaide Football Club went onto win the 1949 SANFL premiership, coached by Ken Farmer.

== Cricket career ==
Haydn Bunton was a leading batsman in the Albury and Border Cricket Association, with an average of 149 in the 1927/28 season and averaged 127 in 1928/29, and his services were sought by many Melbourne District Cricket Clubs.

In December 1928, Bunton (144), was involved in a 280-run, second-wicket partnership with William "Cassie" Andrews (146) from Maitland in a Sydney Country Week Cricket Carnival match on the Sydney Cricket Ground between a combined country week team and a combined Sydney first-grade team.

Bunton commenced playing Melbourne district cricket for the Fitzroy Cricket Club during the 1930/31 season and scored 104 against Prahran on Saturday, 9 January 1932. Bunton played for Fitzroy CC in their losing 1931/32 Melbourne District Cricket grand final against St. Kilda Cricket Club.

All up, he played 25 First XI games for Fitzroy CC between 1930/31 and 1933/34.

In 1944, while serving with the Australian Imperial Force, Bunton was stationed in Wallgrove, Sydney, and played cricket with the Petersham Cricket Club.

== Life outside football ==
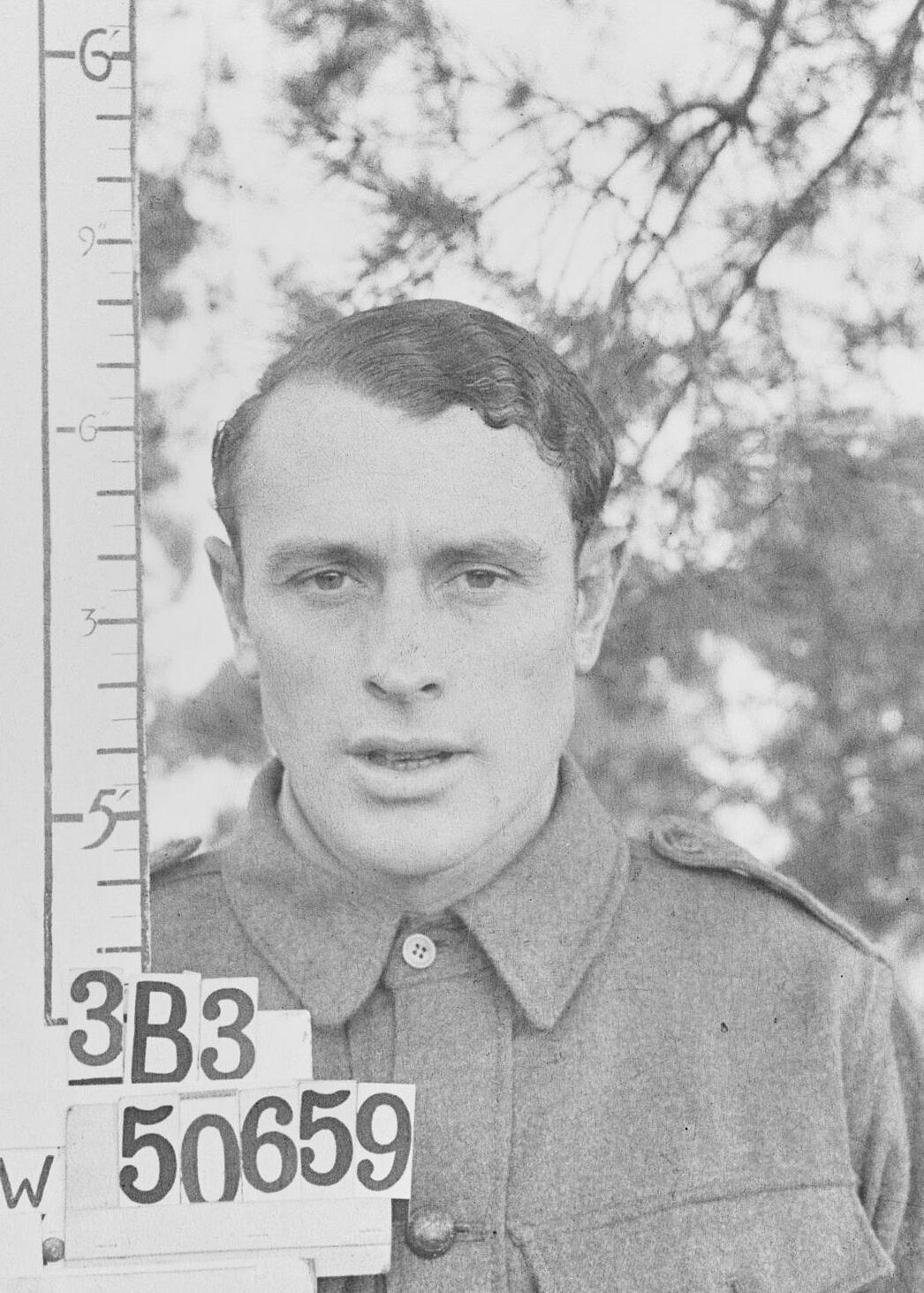
Enlistment headshot of Bunton, 1943

Bunton enlisted in the Australian Army in 1943, at Blackboy Hill, Perth and was assigned to the Royal Australian Army Medical Corps. At the time he was discharged, in April 1945, Bunton (service no. WX37750) was serving with the 5th Motor Ambulance Convoy and held the substantive rank of corporal.

He spent the 1946 SANFL season as an SANFL football field umpire and earned a good reputation in a very short time, umpiring the 1946 SANFL Preliminary Final, with many believing he was very stiff not to umpire the grand final the following week.

In 1949, 1950 and 1951, Bunton was the feature football writer for the Adelaide newspaper The Mail.

== Death and tributes ==
On Thursday 1 September 1955, Bunton was critically injured when his car crashed into three gum trees 11 miles (18 km) north of Gawler, South Australia. He was alone in the car, and he was treated at the scene for severe head injuries, a punctured lung, a fractured collarbone, fractured ribs, and shock. On Saturday morning, two days later, he rallied slightly to encourage his son Haydn Jr. in an important match for North Adelaide that day, telling him: "Go out and do your best, son." Bunton was declared dead on the night of Monday 5 September at the Royal Adelaide Hospital. He was buried at North Road Cemetery in Nailsworth, South Australia.

In 1996, Bunton was named at left forward pocket in the AFL Team of the Century, and he was made an inaugural legend in the Australian Football Hall of Fame.

Bunton was inducted into the Ovens & Murray Football League Hall of Fame in 2018.

== Reputation ==
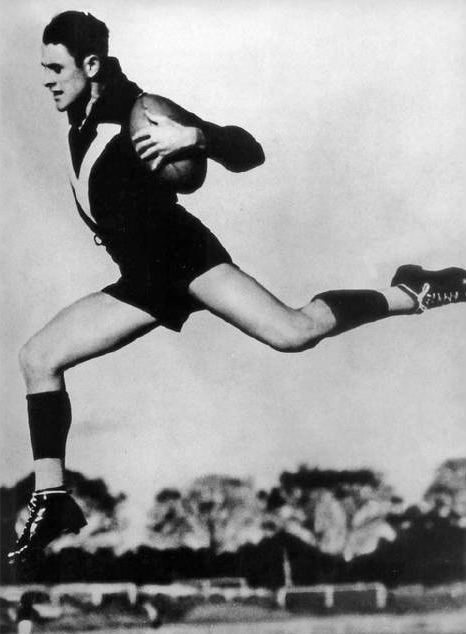
This photograph of Bunton, with a "ball beneath his arm, earth scarcely in view", is the basis of a statue outside the Melbourne Cricket Ground. "He looks like Mercury, the Roman messenger of the gods."

During his playing career, Bunton was considered by fans of the sport as a player of integrity, who rarely if ever engaged in unduly rough play. His fame was enhanced by him having his own radio show on 3DB, and he had a Melbourne newspaper column when he played with Fitzroy. He later had radio programs in Perth and Adelaide. He was regarded as a sex symbol in the 1930s, and his looks were compared to those of film star Rudolf Valentino.

When Essendon legend Dick Reynolds won his first Brownlow Medal in 1934, Bunton, whom Reynolds had narrowly beaten to win the award, was the first person to telegraph his congratulations, a sporting gesture that Reynolds deeply appreciated. During his period with Fitzroy, he was naturally a marked man, but almost perfect balance enabled him to keep out of trouble. He had uncanny ball sense and great speed, was a fine mark, and an accurate, if not outstanding, kick. The Secretary of Fitzroy, J. Buckley, said of Bunton: "Haydn was the greatest player ever to wear the Fitzroy jersey. He had unlimited stamina, courage, and was the quickest thinker I have ever seen." Bunton once played with Don Bradman in a New South Wales country cricket team; and, in the early 1930s, Bunton was regarded as a possible Test cricketer.

According to the family of Sir Doug Nicholls, Bunton was the only Fitzroy teammate to befriend Nicholls, the only Aboriginal VFL player at that time, during his playing career.

In 1999, historian and teacher Ken Mansell wrote "The Ballad of Haydn Bunton", a song that highlighted Bunton's great achievements.

== Family ==
Bunton married Lylia Frances Austin at Scots' Church, Melbourne, on 22 February 1936.

Bunton had two sons: Haydn Bunton Jr., born in 1937, who would become a prominent footballer in his own right, and David.

In July 1945, Mrs. Bunton sued for divorce on the grounds of her husband's misconduct with a certain Doreen May Scott, a member of the Australian Women's Army Service (AWAS).

Bunton remarried Lylia Bunton at the Adelaide Registry Office on Saturday, 7 September 1946, in a closed secret ceremony.

Lylia died suddenly at home on 25 December 1954 at the age of 42, less than a year before her husband.

Bunton's brother, Cleaver Bunton, was a long-serving mayor of Albury and also a senator for a short time in 1975. Cleaver was the first Ovens & Murray Football League life member. Cleaver played in West Albury's 1929 premiership team, was the O&MFL treasurer 1953 to 1993, O&MFL secretary 1930 to 1969 and again in 1976, founder and editor of The Critic from 1924 to 1990, the longest-serving administrator in Australian Rules Football history, founder of Albury Umpires Association, establisher of sporting broadcasts on radio, and was the first to broadcast Ovens & Murray football; the O&MFL club championship award is named after him.
