= Jack Cooper (Australian rules footballer, born 1889) =

Australian rules footballer

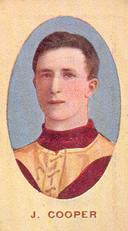

Personal information
- Full name: John Thomas Cooper
- Born: 21 February 1889; Fitzroy North, Victoria
- Died: 20 September 1917 (aged 28); Menin Road Ridge, Polygon Wood, Passchendaele salient, Belgium
- Original team: North Fitzroy Juniors
- Debut: Round 1, 1907, Fitzroy vs. Collingwood, at Victoria Park
- Height: 178 cm (5 ft 10 in)
- Weight: 78 kg (172 lb)

Playing career^{1}
| Years | Club | Games (Goals) |
| 1907–1915 | Fitzroy | 136 (8) |
- ^{1} Playing statistics correct to the end of 1915.

Career highlights
- VFL premiership: 1913; Fitzroy captain: 1912; 2× Fitzroy Club Champion: 1911, 1914; AIF Pioneer Exhibition Game, London, 28 October 1916

John Thomas Cooper (21 February 1889 – 20 September 1917) was an Australian rules footballer who played for Fitzroy in the Victorian Football League (VFL).

He was killed on the Menin Road Ridge whilst serving in the First AIF during the Battle of Passchendaele.

== Early life ==
Jack Cooper was the son of Fred and Florence Cooper. He was born in Fitzroy North on 21 February 1889, and he attended the Alfred Crescent State School in Fitzroy North. In his youth he was a fine cricketer as well as a highly talented footballer, and went on to be a regular player with the Fitzroy Footballers Cricket Club.

He worked for the company of Fitzroy Football Club's president, D.J. "Don" Chandler, as a storeman.

He and his wife, Margaret Malcolm Cooper, née Fletcher, resided at 38 York Street, Fitzroy North, and had one daughter, Margaret Isabel "Maggie" Cooper (1908–?), who became a teacher.

== Footballer ==
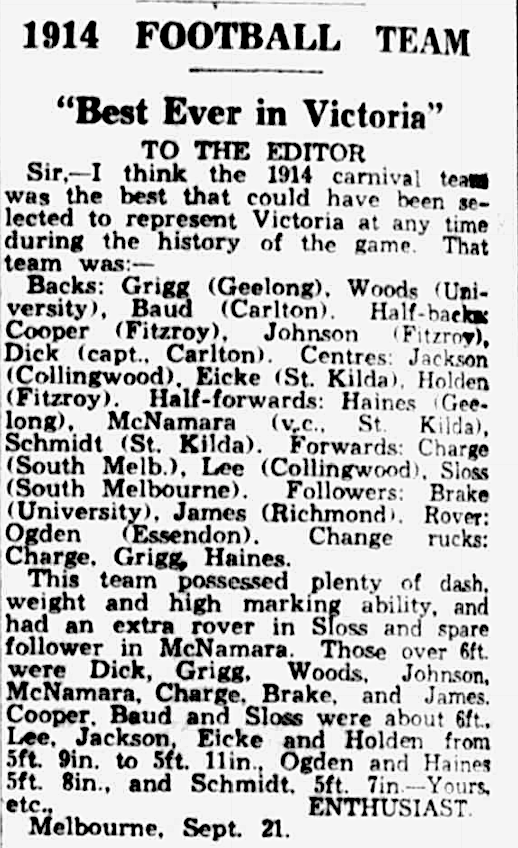
Enthusiast's Letter to the Editor The Herald, 21 September 1934.

A somewhat thick-set man at 5 ft 10 in (178 cm) and 12 st 4 lb (78 kg), Cooper was a champion half-back. Recruited from the local team North Fitzroy Juniors, he played his first senior VFL game for the Fitzroy Football Club against Collingwood on 27 April 1907 at Victoria Park. In his first season, he played 11 matches and scored 1 goal.

In 1912, after he had been appointed captain of the Fitzroy senior team, a contemporary report spoke of the tough, speedy, skilful, and tenacious Cooper as follows:

It would be difficult to select a back man to beat him, although he is rather on the small side. He makes up for his lack of inches with tenacity and pluck.
He sticks to his man all day with a stubbornness commendable to fighter or footballer. He has great dash – the quality of being able to get to the ball in the lead, which all true backmen must have – and he can handle the ball when he reaches it. Handling a football when running is a fine art. The finished player nowadays does not grab the ball with both hands when he reaches it. He scoops it up, as it were, with one hand, as he continues his run.
Anybody can pick up a football when he has plenty of time to seize it, but the crack player must be able to pick up the ball without relaxing his speed. Cooper is an expert at handling the ball but, above all, he is a battler.

He played in the Fitzroy team that won the 1913 premiership by defeating St Kilda 7.14 (56) to 5.13 (43) in the 1913 Grand Final Match; he was one of Fitzroy's best players in that match. He was the Fitzroy club's best and fairest player in both the 1911 and 1914 seasons (see Fitzroy FC honour roll#1910–1919), and he was the Fitzroy team captain in 1912, and its vice-captain from 1913 to 1915.

He also played eight games for Victoria, including the match against South Australia at the Adelaide Oval on 10 August 1912, when he captained the Victorian team that lost to South Australia 9.8 (62) to 6.7 (43).

In his career with Fitzroy he played 136 senior games and scored 8 goals.

He played his last senior VFL game for Fitzroy on Saturday 11 September 1915, in the 1915 Preliminary Final, that was won by Carlton 6.18 (54) to 5.8 (38).

=== Dealings with VFL Tribunal ===
He was reported once in his playing career, in the 14 August 1909 match against Carlton at the Brunswick Street Oval, for charging and striking; he was suspended for 12 weeks.

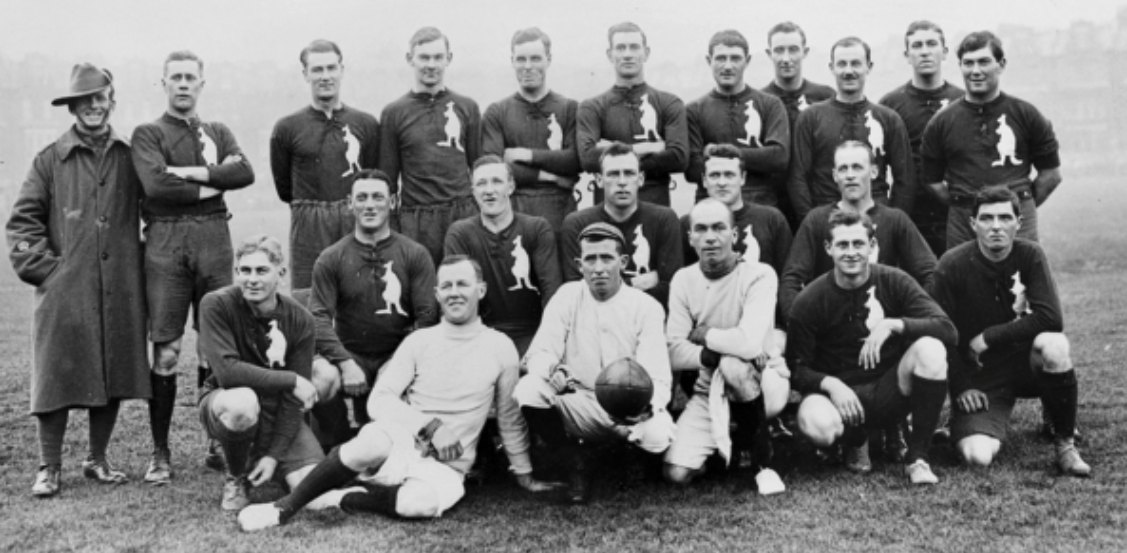
The Australian Training Units Team: 28 October 1916. Jack Cooper is the eighth man (seventh player) from the left, in the top row.

In the 26 June 1915 match against Carlton at the Brunswick Street Oval, a former Fitzroy player, the Carlton centre half-back and team captain Billy Dick, was reported for striking Cooper; Dick was suspended for 10 weeks.

== Soldier ==
Leaving his employment as a storeman, he enlisted in the 8th Battalion of the First AIF on 8 November 1915 and left for France on the troopship Wiltshire on 7 March 1916.

In France, Cooper saw action in the Battle of the Somme. He was only in the trenches for a short time when he was so badly gassed that once his immediate discomfort had been dealt with, he was repatriated to England to allow him to recuperate.

Having recuperated fully, he played for the (losing) Australian Training Units team in the famous "Pioneer Exhibition Game" of Australian Rules football, held in London, in October 1916, just before returning to active service in France. A news film was taken at the match.

Most likely through the effects of the gas, Cooper's throat continued to give him a lot of trouble (he almost lost his voice) and, once again, he was repatriated to England.

Although he was sent to Aldershot for officer training, he never rose above the rank of Lance-Corporal.

== Death ==
He returned to France once more and was killed in action in Belgium, at Polygon Wood, during the Battle of Passchendaele on 20 September 1917.

His remains were never recovered. He is commemorated in the Menin Gate Memorial to the Missing in Ypres, Belgium; and his name appears at panel 52 in the Commemorative Area at the Australian War Memorial.

== See also ==
- 1914 Sydney Carnival
- 1916 Pioneer Exhibition Game
- List of Victorian Football League players who died on active service
- Fitzroy FC honour roll
