= Don Furness (Australian rules footballer) =

Australian rules footballer and coach

Personal information
- Born: 9 November 1930
- Died: 21 February 2002 (aged 71); Melbourne
- Original team: Preston Swimmers
- Height: 178 cm (5 ft 10 in)
- Weight: 79 kg (174 lb)

Playing career^{1}
Years	Club	Games (Goals)
1949–1959	Fitzroy	136 (43)
- ^{1} Playing statistics correct to the end of 1959.

Career highlights
- 2× Fitzroy Club Champion: 1953, 1955

Don Furness (9 November 1930 – 21 February 2002) was an Australian rules footballer who played his entire career with Fitzroy in the VFL during the 1950s. He was a left footer usually played as a centreman or in the wing.

Furness was at his best in the mid-1950s where he won the Best and Fairest twice. He was also a VFL interstate representative.

After leaving Fitzroy, Furness was coach of Port Melbourne (VFA) briefly in the 1960s.

He was also an accomplished professional footrunner with his best win being the 1961 Keilor Gift. Following his death in 2002, the richest and most prestigious 70m sprint event on the professional running calendar was named in his honour. The Don Furness Memorial sprint has been held since 2003 and is held at the Avondale Heights Gift athletic meet each year (February) and has a handicap limit of 6.0m.

Furness died in February 2002.
