= Len Wigraft =

Australian rules footballer

Personal information
- Full name: Leonard Herman Wigraft
- Born: 28 January 1897; North Fitzroy, Victoria
- Died: 16 January 1982 (aged 84); Parkville, Victoria
- Original team: Preston
- Height: 180 cm (5 ft 11 in)
- Weight: 76 kg (168 lb)

Playing career^{1}
Years	Club	Games (Goals)
1917–1927	Fitzroy	135 (41)

Coaching career
Years	Club	Games (W–L–D)
1934	Fitzroy	16 (6–10–0)
- ^{1} Playing statistics correct to the end of 1927.

Career highlights
- VFL premiership: 1922; 3× Fitzroy Club Champion: 1920, 1924, 1925

Leonard Herman Wigraft (a.k.a. "Wigraf") (28 January 1897 – 16 January 1982) was an Australian rules footballer who played with Fitzroy in the Victorian Football League (VFL).

== Family ==
The son of Frederick Wigraf (a.k.a. "Wigraft") (1865-1920), and Ellen Wigraf (a.k.a. "Wigraft") (1865-1947), née Martin, Leonard Herman Wigraft (a.k.a. "Wigraf") was born at North Fitzroy on 28 January 1897.

He married Dorothy May Axton (-1989) in 1918.

== Football ==
Wigraft usually played as a follower and won a VFL premiership with Fitzroy in 1922. He was also a three-time Best and Fairest winner with Fitzroy – in 1920, 1924 and 1925.

He captained Fitzroy in his last season of football in 1927 and was briefly their caretaker coach in 1934.

Len was captain-coach of Echuca in 1928, and 1929, which included their 1928 Bendigo Football League premiership.

Wigraft then coached Richmond Reserves in 1930.

He returned to Fitzroy in the 1930s as a club delegate and then took over as coach in May 1934, after captain-coach, Jack Cashman resigned and was cleared to Carlton.

== Hall of Fame ==
In recognition to his long service to the Fitzroy football club and his playing abilities, he was inducted to the Fitzroy Hall of Fame.

== Death ==
He died at Parkville, Victoria on 16 January 1982.

== See also ==
- 1927 Melbourne Carnival
