= Norm Brown =

Australian rules footballer and coach (1943–2022)

Personal information
- Born: 6 August 1943
- Died: 1 December 2022 (aged 79)
- Original team: North Heidelberg
- Height: 191 cm (6 ft 3 in)
- Weight: 94 kg (207 lb)

Playing career^{1}
Years	Club	Games (Goals)
1962–1973	Fitzroy	181 (77)
1974-1977	Port Melbourne	31 (32)
Total		211 (109)
- ^{1} Playing statistics correct to the end of 1973.

Career highlights
- 3× Fitzroy Club Champion: 1965, 1966, 1967; Fitzroy Team of the Century

Norman Brown (6 August 1943 – 1 December 2022) was an Australian rules footballer who played with Fitzroy in the VFL.

== Football ==
=== Fitzroy (VFL) ===
Brown joined Fitzroy from North Heidelberg in 1962. Known for his size (191 cm), physical strength and courage, he was not particularly pretty to watch. However, playing in an era when Fitzroy sides were not very strong, Brown, along with Kevin Murray, were outstanding players, between them winning all possible 10 best and fairest awards during the 1960s.

=== Saturday, 6 July 1963 ===
On 6 July 1963, playing as a resting back-pocket ruckman, he was a member of the young and inexperienced Fitzroy team that comprehensively and unexpectedly defeated Geelong, 9.13 (67) to 3.13 (31) in the 1963 Miracle Match.

=== Port Melbourne (VFA) ===
In 1974, Brown transferred to Port Melbourne in the Victorian Football Association as captain-coach. Brown served in this position for four seasons, and led the club to premierships in 1974, 1976 and 1977, plus the 1977 Centenary Cup competition. He retired from playing at the end of 1977, and spent one more season as non-playing coach of Port Melbourne in 1978. He was also the inaugural VFA coach of the 1980s incarnation of the Moorabbin Football Club in 1983.

== Career highlights ==
Playing career: 1962 – 1973 (181 games; 77 goals; 21 Brownlow votes)

== Honours ==
A 191 cm ruckman, Brown won three successive Fitzroy best and fairest awards and was named in the forward line in their Team of the Century.

- Fitzroy Best and Fairest: 1965, 1966, 1967.
- Fitzroy Team of the Century.
- Victorian representative: 8 games.

== See also ==
- 1963 Miracle Match
