= Chris Lethbridge =

Australian rules footballer and coach

Personal information
- Full name: Christopher Francis Lethbridge
- Born: 24 May 1890; Brighton East, Victoria
- Died: 25 March 1970 (aged 79); Caulfield, Victoria
- Original team: Sydney YMCA
- Height: 183 cm (6 ft 0 in)
- Weight: 83 kg (183 lb)

Playing career^{1}
Years	Club	Games (Goals)
1913–1922	Fitzroy	148 (19)

Coaching career^{3}
Years	Club	Games (W–L–D)
1925	Fitzroy	17 (12–5–0)
- ^{1} Playing statistics correct to the end of 1922.^{3} Coaching statistics correct as of 1925.

Career highlights
- Fitzroy premiership player 1913; Fitzroy premiership captain 1922; Fitzroy captain 1921–1922

Christopher Francis Lethbridge (24 May 1890 – 25 March 1970) was an Australian rules footballer who played with Fitzroy in the VFL.

== Family ==
The son of Christopher Montague Lethbridge (1852–1906), and Alice Maud Lethbridge (died 1922), née Emmerson, Christopher Francis Lethbridge was born in Brighton East on 24 May 1890. The family moved to Wagga Wagga in New South Wales very early in his life.

He married Bertha Lillian White (1893–1974) on 18 March 1916.

== Football ==
Lethbridge was originally from New South Wales and played in defence for Fitzroy.

Granted a clearance from Y.M.C.A. Sydney on 23 May 1913, he made his debut, against South Melbourne, on 7 June 1913; and was a member of Fitzroy's premiership side that year.

In 1921 he took over the captaincy from Percy Parratt and in 1922 he captained Fitzroy to another flag before retiring at the season's end, thus becoming one of the few players in league history to be a member of premiership sides in his first and last season.

=== Non-playing coach ===
Lethbridge returned to the Fitzroy in 1925 and — replacing Vic Belcher, who had gone to coach the City Football Club in Launceston — served as its non-playing coach for the 1925 season.

The announcement of his appointment caused genuine pleasure, for few players enjoy the popularity that Lethbridge does. It was in 1922 he led the Fitzroy team to the premiership, made his fearless play as a half-back made him famous wherever the Australian game was played. Lethbridge is a renowned footballer, and he has the reputation of being one of the toughest men the game has known. A fighter of great courage, it is a wonder his fearlessness has never cost him serious injury, but he generally emerged unscathed. (The Sporting Globe, 22 April 1925.)
