= Paul Roos (Australian rules footballer) =

Australian rules footballer (born 1963)

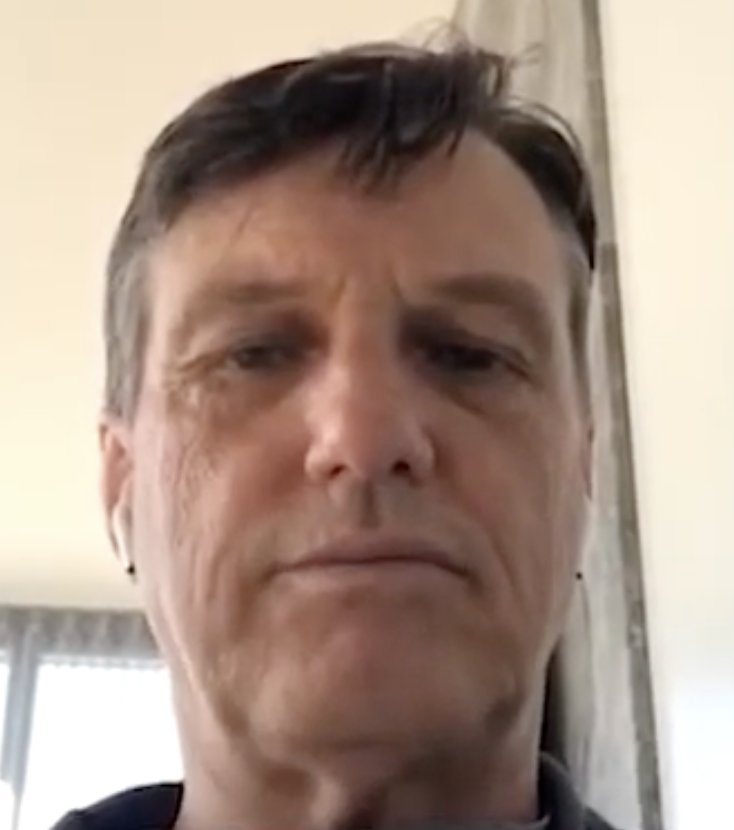
- Roos in 2023

Personal information
- Nickname: Roosy
- Born: 27 June 1963 (age 63)
- Original team: Beverley Hills (YJFL)
- Height: 188 cm (6 ft 2 in)
- Weight: 88 kg (194 lb)
- Position: Key Defender

Playing career^{1}
Years	Club	Games (Goals)
1982–1994	Fitzroy	269 (270)
1995–1998	Sydney	87 (19)
Total		356 (289)

Representative team honours
Years	Team	Games (Goals)
	Victoria	14 (11)

Coaching career^{3}
Years	Club	Games (W–L–D)
2002–2010	Sydney	202 (116–84–2)
2014–2016	Melbourne	66 (21–45–0)
Total		268 (137–129-2)
- ^{1} Playing statistics correct to the end of 1998.^{3} Coaching statistics correct as of 2016.

Career highlights
- Player: Leigh Matthews Trophy: 1986; Fitzroy Captain: 1988–1990, 1992–1994; 5× Mitchell Medal: 1985, 1986, 1991, 1992, 1994; Fitzroy Leading Goalkicker: 1990; 7× All-Australian: 1985, 1987, 1988, 1991, 1992, 1996, 1997; 2× All-Australian Captain: 1991, 1992; 2× VFL Team of the Year: 1986, 1987; Australian Football Hall of Fame; Fitzroy Team of the Century (Centre Half Back); Fitzroy Hall of Fame; Representative: 2× E. J. Whitten Medal: 1985, 1988; Victoria Captain; Coach: AFLCA Coach of the Year: 2003; AFL Premiership: 2005; All-Australian Team: 2005

Paul Roos (born 27 June 1963) is a former Australian rules football coach who coached the Sydney Swans and Melbourne Football Club in the Australian Football League (AFL). As a player, he represented Fitzroy and Sydney during the 1980s and 1990s.

A versatile key-position player, Roos was a strong mark who was excellent at ground level, and in his prime was rated the best footballer in Australia. He was one of the Fitzroy Lions' finest players in its final years, and was named at centre half back in Fitzroy's Team of the Century. In his 17 seasons of League football, he was only reported once, for abusive language, and was found not guilty.

Roos was inducted into the Australian Football Hall of Fame in 2005. He has won many accolades throughout his career: he was named All-Australian seven times; received the league's most valuable player (MVP) award; and represented Victoria on 14 occasions in State of Origin. He is also the AFL/VFL record holder for the number of games played wearing the number 1 jumper, which he wore throughout his 356-game career with both the Fitzroy Lions and the Sydney Swans.

After finishing as a player, Roos went on to become a successful coach. He was the senior coach of the Sydney Swans from 2002 to 2010 and guided the Swans to the 2005 Premiership after they had finished the regular season in 3rd place on the ladder. The Swans' previous Premiership had been 72 years earlier when they were the South Melbourne Swans. Roos then coached the Melbourne Football Club from 2014 to 2016.

== Early life ==
Roos grew up in the Melbourne suburb of Donvale and played junior football with Beverley Hills Football Club in Doncaster East. He attended Donvale High School from 1975 until 1981. As Beverley Hills was in Fitzroy's recruiting zone, Roos was selected to play for the Fitzroy Lions in their under-19s team.

== Playing career ==
=== Fitzroy ===
Roos made his senior VFL debut for Fitzroy in Round 4 of the 1982 season against Sydney, the club he eventually moved to 13 years later. Also making his debut along with Roos was 16-year-old Gary Pert, who became one of Roos' best teammates. In Round 9, he was named at full-forward against St Kilda and kicked seven goals in a 47-point win.

In 1986, Roos polled a career high 16 votes in the Brownlow Medal to finish runner-up. He ended his career with 121 Brownlow votes (98 with Fitzroy and 23 with Sydney).

Roos was appointed captain of Fitzroy in 1988 and led the club in 122 games until 1994.

During his playing career at Fitzroy, Roos was selected as an All-Australian in 1985, 1987, 1988, 1991 (as captain) and 1992 (as captain). He also represented Victoria in State of Origin as captain.

Roos left Fitzroy at the end of 1994 to join the Sydney Swans. In leaving Fitzroy for Sydney, Roos cited financial difficulty, the departure of key players (such as Gary Pert to Collingwood) and the club's relocation to the Western Oval as the main reasons for moving to Sydney.

Roos played for Fitzroy Football Club from 1982 until 1994, where he played for a total of 269 games and kicked a total of 270 goals.

=== Sydney Swans ===
Roos joined Sydney Swans in 1995 on a three-year contract. While Roos was at the Swans, he was one of Sydney's best in the 1996 AFL Grand Final loss to North Melbourne. He again qualified as an All-Australian in 1996 and 1997. He finished his playing career at the Sydney Swans with 87 games and 19 goals at the end of 1998.

In his playing days, he was often cheered by supporters with a distinctive, deep rolling roar of "ROOOOOOS!".

== Coaching career ==
=== United States ===
When his playing career ended, in 1999, Roos spent some time in the United States, his wife's homeland. He coached the national Australian rules team to victory over Canada. He is often credited as one of the key people in the success of the fledgling United States Australian Football League, establishing networks with key people in the country.

=== Sydney Swans ===
Returning to Australia and the Sydney Swans, Roos then became an assistant coach under senior coach Rodney Eade in 2001. Part-way through the 2002 season, with the Swans' record becoming worse by the week, Eade resigned. The club administration started the search for a new coach and it is widely believed that negotiations with Terry Wallace were at an advanced stage. Nevertheless, when Eade finally went with several games of the minor round still to be played, Roos was appointed caretaker senior coach for the remainder of the 2002 season, a move hugely popular with Swans fans, who remembered his great contribution to the club as a player.

As caretaker senior coach, Roos immediately transformed the dispirited Swans players. Several who had struggled under Eade blossomed under his leadership. Surprisingly, the Swans won most of their remaining games that year (six of their last ten), and the fans soon let it be known who they wanted as coach by reviving the famous "Roooos" call. Despite this, the club administration continued their talks with Wallace (and perhaps others). Finally however, they were unable to ignore the players' own support for Roos, when, after a win in the last game of the year against Richmond, all the players surrounded Roos on the field and, unprecedentedly, themselves joined in the "Roooos" call. The administrators knew when they were beaten, and appointed Roos as full-time senior coach for the 2003 season (despite reportedly having to pay Wallace a considerable amount to unwind their almost-concluded deal with him).

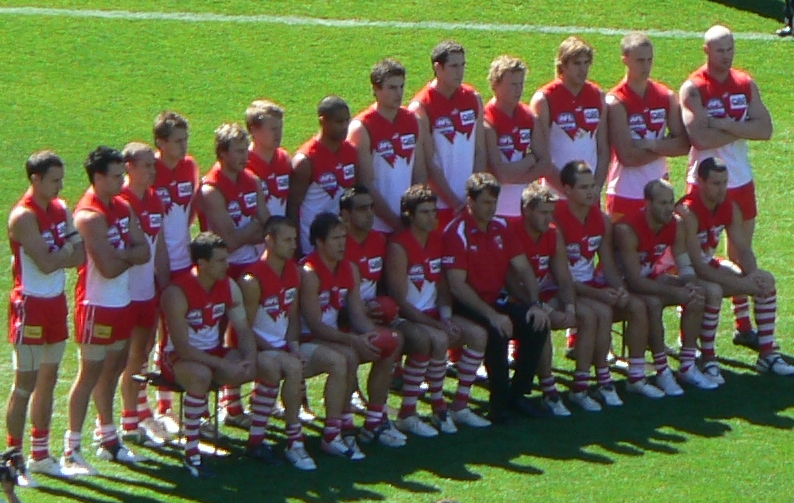
Roos with Sydney's 2006 AFL Grand Final team

Under Roos' coaching, Sydney Swans participated in every finals series between 2003 and 2008. They made it to the preliminary final stage in 2003, the semi-final stage in 2004, won the Premiership in 2005 and almost retained it in 2006, losing the Grand Final by only one point, and then got eliminated in the first week of the 2007 finals. They made it to the second week of the 2008 finals. But 2009 was the second time under Roos' leadership that they didn't make the finals.

Roos also implemented a policy of giving up first round draft picks in exchange for players from other clubs: namely, Darren Jolly, Ted Richards, Peter Everitt, Martin Mattner, Rhyce Shaw and Shane Mumford in the years 2004–2009 inclusive. all of whom earned more game-time than they did at their original clubs; this policy paying off for Paul Roos.

In 2005, Roos' coaching style was criticised by AFL CEO Andrew Demetriou, who referred to the Swans' defensive and negative style of play (presumably the tactics of flooding, and retaining possession through short chip kicks). Demetriou even went so far as to claim that the Swans would never win a premiership playing such an unattractive style of football. As a result of Demetriou's criticisms, the Swans were labelled by the media, especially in Melbourne, as the ugly ducklings.

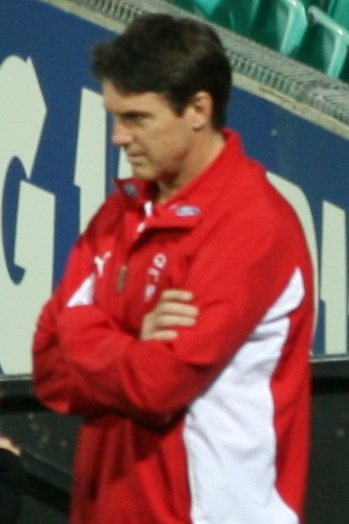
Roos as Sydney coach in 2008

Roos and his Swans were criticised for their game plan in a match against St Kilda in mid-2005. This led to the media, led by Andrew Demetriou and the Network Ten commentary team, led by Stephen Quartermain, Tim Lane and Robert Walls describing their game plan as "disgusting" and "ugly". The Swans misbehaved during the match, and lost the match 15.11 (101) – 8.10 (58), a result which proved to be the turning point in the Swans' season, only losing three more matches (by single margins) for the rest of the year. Roos and the Swans would however have the last laugh as they defeated the Saints in the preliminary final with a 15.6 (96) – 9.11 (65) win, denying them a shot at their second premiership. Coincidentally, in the 2005 AFL Grand Final, the Sydney Swans under Roos, would also kick 8.10 (58), this time defeating the West Coast Eagles which scored 7.12 (54) to win the premiership.

Roos proved his critics wrong by leading the Swans to their first premiership in 72 years, with a hard-fought win against the West Coast Eagles in the most thrilling Grand Final for a number of years. Many believe that the AFL's change of rules for the 2006 season was in direct response to the Swans' style of play, but this was later denied by the AFL.

In the 2006 pre-season, Roos briefly returned to the US with his Swans side for an exhibition match against the Kangaroos at UCLA, and suggested that this should become an annual event.

Things became serious when the Swans lost at home to the rampant Adelaide Crows by 39 points, 15.11 (101) to 8.14 (62). Roos cited a lack of hunger and even went so far as to say that his team was "clearly incapable of winning the premiership", but the Sydney Swans under Roos managed to reach the 2006 AFL Grand Final against the West Coast Eagles, losing by one point.

In Round 12, 2007, Sydney faced Collingwood, and lost in a game that Roos described as the worst game he had ever coached in his five-year stint at the Swans. He responded by dropping star forward Barry Hall, who had been struggling with injury.

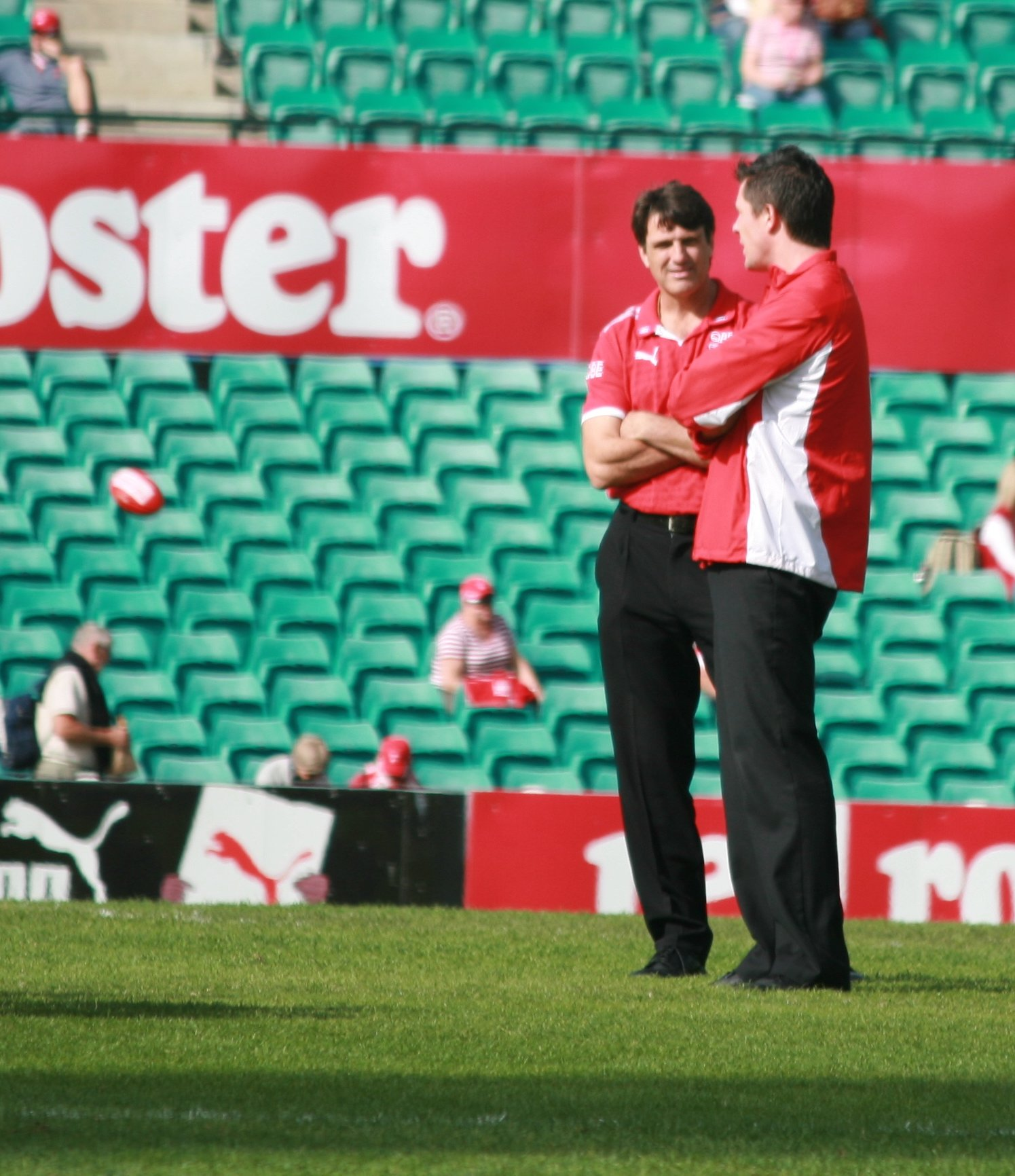
Roos with Sydney in 2009

Roos also accused Carlton of tanking to gain a third successive priority draft pick when the Blues lost its final 11 matches of the regular season, most by lopsided margins (which ultimately led to the sacking of his Carlton counterpart Denis Pagan). This included a 62-point pasting from Roos' Swans in Round 15, the penultimate round before Pagan was sacked.

In early 2008, Roos was alleged to have been in the centre of a match-fixing controversy involving wingman Jarrad McVeigh. His alleged instructions to McVeigh was to "go forward, just don't kick a goal" during the final stages of the Swans' NAB Cup match against Hawthorn, which the Swans lost by two points. Roos was cleared of any wrongdoing by the AFL one month later, as it turned out to be a joke regarding McVeigh's poor accuracy during the 2007 AFL season.

He also coached from the bench in the first match of the 2008 season in which his Swans were beaten by St Kilda in a tight match.

In 2008, the Swans under Roos made the finals in 6th position and then made a terrific 35 point come-from-behind win against the North Melbourne Kangaroos in the elimination final.

The 2009 season, turned out to be Roos' worst ever season at the Swans, and the Swans' worst season since 1995, when it failed to make the finals, winning only eight games (five of which came in the first nine rounds of the season) and finishing in 12th position. At the end of the 2009 season, Roos announced that he would retire and step down as senior coach of Sydney Swans at the end of the 2010 season.

Roos coached out the 2010 AFL season in which the Sydney Swans returned to the finals after missing the finals in 2009. They defeated Carlton by five points in its home elimination final but the following week were eliminated by the Western Bulldogs in the second week of the finals by the same margin. He retired at the end of the season and was replaced by assistant coach John Longmire in a succession plan. In all he coached 202 games for Sydney, including 16 finals, 9 of which were won.

=== Melbourne Football Club ===
On 6 September 2013, Roos was appointed senior coach of the Melbourne Football Club on a two-year contract, with the option of a third year. Roos replaced Melbourne Football Club caretaker senior coach Neil Craig, who replaced Mark Neeld, after Neeld was sacked in the middle of the 2013 season. On 28 July 2014, Roos signed on for the third year.

He has been accredited for helping the Demons improve their fortunes on the field; the club under Roos in his first season as Melbourne Demons Football Club senior coach in the 2014 season won four games for the season and eighteen losses, where they finished seventeenth, which is the second-last placed position on the ladder. However this doubled their total tally from the previous season, and its percentage improved from 54.07% in 2013 to 68.04% in 2014. He also delivered on the promise of the club being "the hardest to play against". However, in Round 21, 2014, Roos and the Demons came under fire after suffering a 64-point defeat to an injury-hit Greater Western Sydney side which could only operate a one-man bench in the entire second half.

In the 2015 season, Melbourne Demons under Roos finished in thirteenth place on the ladder with seven wins and fifteen losses. In the 2016 season, Melbourne Demons under Roos finished in eleventh place on the ladder with ten wins and twelve losses.

Roos stepped down as Melbourne Football Club senior coach at the end of the 2016 season and was replaced by assistant coach Simon Goodwin in a succession plan.

== Media work ==
After retiring from coaching at AFL level, Roos was appointed head coach of the QBE Sydney Swans Academy, he is the main leader of the academy which has over 300 players. In addition, he had several football-related media roles, including writing for the Herald Sun and doing match day analysis for Fox Footy. He also hosted On the Couch on Fox Footy alongside Gerard Healy and Mike Sheahan between 2011 and 2013. Following his tenure as Melbourne coach, in November 2016 Roos joined radio station Triple M in a special comments role as well as returning to Fox Footy as an expert commentator both positions he retains.

Prior to being appointed as the senior coach of the Melbourne Demons in 2013, Roos was reluctant to coach another club after leaving the Sydney Swans. Despite informal inquiries from other clubs like West Coast, Adelaide, Melbourne, Gold Coast, Carlton, and the successor to his old club Fitzroy, the Brisbane Lions, Roos had repeatedly insisted he has no intention of coaching another AFL club

Roos was critical of the substitute rule which was introduced by the AFL in 2011, claiming that the rule, which aimed to lessen injuries resulting from collisions, could have the opposite effect of forcing injured players to stay on the field:

The thing that concerns me the most is you can interchange a guy in the third quarter so he comes off, can't come back on again, and you get an injury in the last quarter of the game and you've got a healthy player sitting on the bench doing nothing and an unhealthy player still in your rotations. That really, really concerns me.

== Statistics ==
=== Playing statistics ===
Legend
G	Goals	K	Kicks	D	Disposals	T	Tackles
B	Behinds	H	Handballs	M	Marks

Led the league after season and finals

Season	Team	No.	Games	Totals							Averages (per game)							Votes
Season	Team	No.	Games	G	B	K	H	D	M	T	G	B	K	H	D	M	T	Votes
1982	Fitzroy	1	13	26	15	66	34	100	31	—N/a	2.0	1.2	5.1	2.6	7.7	2.4	—N/a	0
1983	Fitzroy	1	23	22	19	235	140	375	111	—N/a	1.0	0.8	10.2	6.1	16.3	4.8	—N/a	3
1984	Fitzroy	1	22	10	10	283	118	401	129	—N/a	0.5	0.5	12.9	5.4	18.2	5.9	—N/a	6
1985	Fitzroy	1	22	3	1	328	139	467	153	—N/a	0.1	0.0	14.9	6.3	21.2	7.0	—N/a	16
1986	Fitzroy	1	24	5	3	371	158	529	150	—N/a	0.2	0.1	15.5	6.6	22.0	6.3	—N/a	16
1987	Fitzroy	1	21	29	17	300	132	432	169	16	1.4	0.8	14.3	6.3	20.6	8.0	0.8	10
1988	Fitzroy	1	20	30	21	278	128	406	149	26	1.5	1.1	13.9	6.4	20.3	7.5	1.3	4
1989	Fitzroy	1	20	36	16	308	76	384	140	19	1.8	0.8	15.4	3.8	19.2	7.0	1.0	8
1990	Fitzroy	1	22	49	38	280	97	377	137	16	2.2	1.7	12.7	4.4	17.1	6.2	0.7	3
1991	Fitzroy	1	22	21	18	288	173	461	123	18	1.0	0.8	13.1	7.9	21.0	5.6	0.8	11
1992	Fitzroy	1	22	17	9	388	143	531	149	28	0.8	0.4	17.6	6.5	24.1	6.8	1.3	10
1993	Fitzroy	1	16	8	13	223	141	364	109	28	0.5	0.8	13.9	8.8	22.8	6.8	1.8	5
1994	Fitzroy	1	22	14	11	316	207	523	141	33	0.6	0.5	14.4	9.4	23.8	6.4	1.5	6
1995	Sydney	1	21	7	13	234	187	421	113	14	0.3	0.6	11.1	8.9	20.0	5.4	0.7	2
1996	Sydney	1	24	4	5	276	204	480	156	24	0.2	0.2	11.5	8.5	20.0	6.5	1.0	14
1997	Sydney	1	21	6	3	240	158	398	98	15	0.3	0.1	11.4	7.5	19.0	4.7	0.7	7
1998	Sydney	1	21	2	4	174	174	348	82	25	0.1	0.2	8.3	8.3	16.6	3.9	1.2	0
Career			356	289	216	4588	2409	6997	2140	262	0.8	0.6	12.9	6.8	19.7	6.0	1.0	121

=== Coaching statistics ===
Legend
W	Wins	L	Losses	D	Draws	W%	Winning percentage	LP	Ladder position	LT	League teams

Season	Team	Games	W	L	D	W %	LP	LT
2002	Sydney	10	6	4	0	60.0%	11	16
2003	Sydney	24	15	9	0	62.5%	4	16
2004	Sydney	24	14	10	0	58.3%	6	16
2005	Sydney	26	18	8	0	69.2%	3	16
2006	Sydney	25	16	9	0	64.0%	4	16
2007	Sydney	23	12	10	1	54.3%	7	16
2008	Sydney	24	13	10	1	56.3%	6	16
2009	Sydney	22	8	14	0	36.4%	12	16
2010	Sydney	24	14	10	0	58.3%	5	16
2014	Melbourne	22	4	18	0	18.2%	17	18
2015	Melbourne	22	7	15	0	31.8%	13	18
2016	Melbourne	22	10	12	0	45.5%	11	18
Career totals		268	137	129	2	51.5%		

== Honours and achievements ==
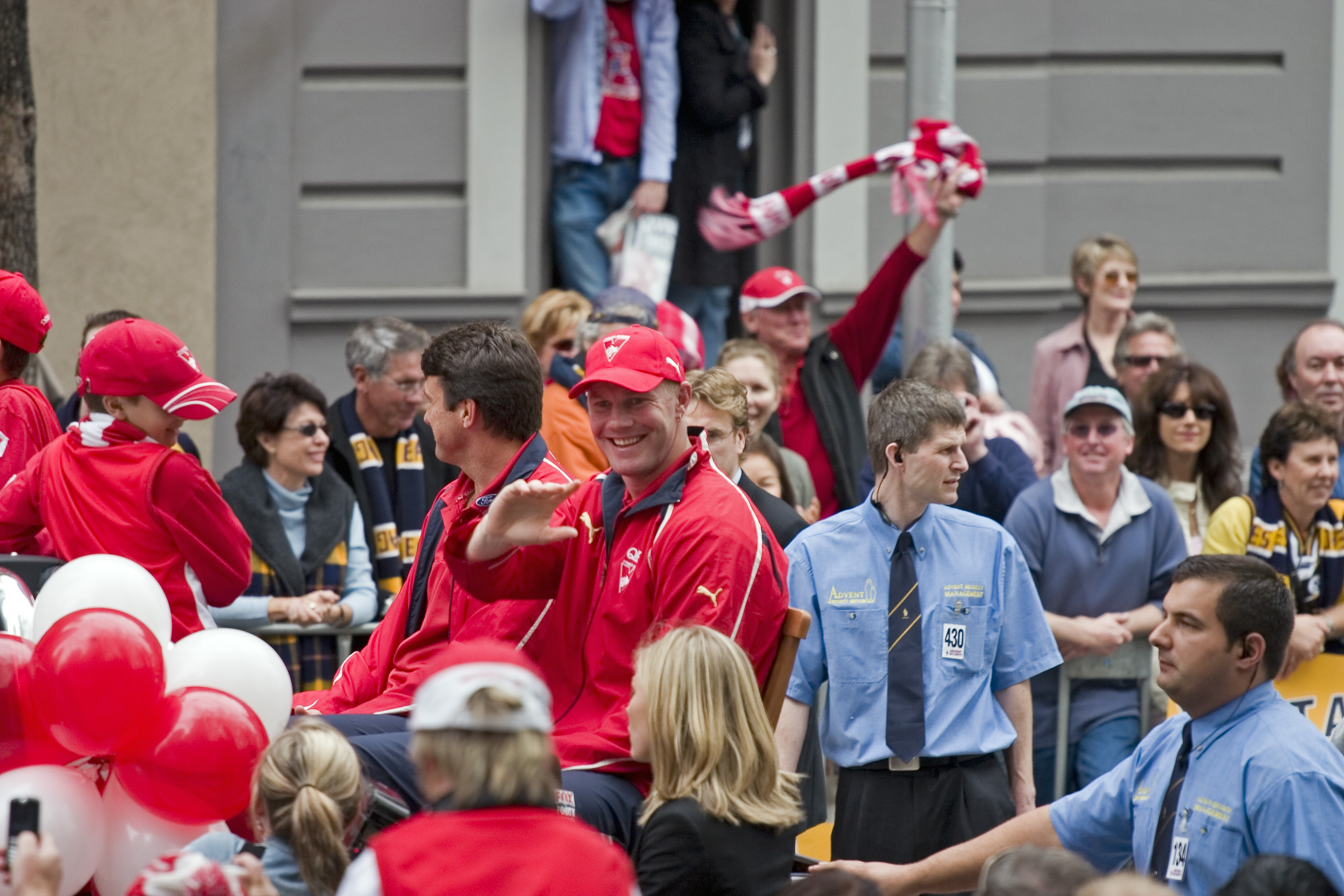
Roos with Barry Hall at the 2005 AFL Grand Final parade

=== Playing honours ===
Teams

- McClelland Trophy (Sydney): 1996

Individual

- Leigh Matthews Trophy (AFLPA MVP Award): 1986
- All-Australian: 1985, 1987, 1988, 1991 (C), 1992 (C), 1996, 1997
- AFLPA Best Captain Award: 1992
- Australian Football Media Association Player of the Year Award: 1986
- Mitchell Medal (Fitzroy F.C. B&F): 1985, 1986, 1991, 1992, 1994
- Fitzroy F.C. Leading Goalkicker: 1990
- Fitzroy Football Club Captain: 1988–1990, 1992–1994
- Fitzroy F.C. Team of the Century – Centre Half Back
- Australian Football Hall of Fame inductee: 2005
- Brisbane Lions Hall of Fame Inductee: 2012

=== Coaching honours ===
Teams

- AFL Premiership (Sydney): 2005

Individual

- Jock McHale Medal: 2005
- All-Australian: 2005

== Personal life ==
In 1992, Roos married American native Tami Hardy, a meditation teacher from San Diego. They have two sons, Dylan and Tyler, the latter of whom appeared on The Amazing Race Australia in 2019 and dated American tennis player Amanda Anisimova.

In September 2003, Roos ruptured his Achilles tendon during a game of social basketball, and was seen on crutches during the Swans' qualifying final win over Port Adelaide at AAMI Stadium the following weekend.

In 2008 he was named Australian Father of the Year in recognition of his ability to balance the needs of his family with the responsibilities of managing a high-profile sports team.

== Bibliography ==
- Holmesby, Russell; Main, Jim (2011). The Encyclopedia of AFL Footballers: Every AFL/VFL Player Since 1897 (9th ed.). Seaford: Bas Publishing. ISBN 978-1-921496-12-7.
