= Harvey Merrigan =

Australian rules footballer

Personal information
- Born: 4 December 1949 (age 76)
- Original team: Hampton Park
- Height: 189 cm (6 ft 2 in)
- Weight: 90 kg (198 lb)

Playing career^{1}
Years	Club	Games (Goals)
1969–1981	Fitzroy	197 (18)
- ^{1} Playing statistics correct to the end of 1981.

Career highlights
- Fitzroy captain: 1978; Fitzroy Club Champion: 1974; Fitzroy team of the century

Harvey Merrigan (born 4 December 1949) is a former Australian rules footballer who played with Fitzroy in the VFL during the 1970s. He won Fitzroy's Best and Fairest in 1974, only the second fullback to win the award for the club with the other being Vic Chanter.

In a game against Melbourne in 1979, Fitzroy put on 238 points and Merrigan kicked the goal that enabled them to pass the then-record for highest score in a VFL game.
