= Arthur Batchelor =

Australian rules footballer

Personal information
- Full name: Arthur Vincent Batchelor
- Born: 25 November 1902; Maffra, Victoria
- Died: 5 May 1952 (aged 49); Richmond, Victoria
- Original team: Maffra
- Height: 168 cm (5 ft 6 in)
- Weight: 63 kg (139 lb)

Playing career^{1}
Years	Club	Games (Goals)
1924–1931	Fitzroy	112 (70)
1932	North Melbourne	3 (0)
Total		115 (70)
- ^{1} Playing statistics correct to the end of 1932.

Career highlights
- Fitzroy Club Champion: 1929

Arthur Vincent Batchelor (25 November 1902 – 5 May 1952) was an Australian rules footballer who played for Fitzroy and North Melbourne in the Victorian Football League (VFL).

Batchelor originally trained with Melbourne but after failing to impress them in training went to Fitzroy where he was picked up. One of the smallest rovers in the league at the time, Batchelor spent eight seasons with Fitzroy and won their best player award in 1929. He transferred to North Melbourne in 1932 but could only manage three games. During his career he played for the Victorian interstate side on seven occasions.
