= Ross Thornton =

Australian rules footballer (1956–2024)

Personal information
- Born: 23 October 1956
- Died: 25 April 2024 (aged 67)
- Original team: Camperdown (HFL)
- Height: 179 cm (5 ft 10 in)
- Weight: 81 kg (179 lb)

Playing career^{1}
Years	Club	Games (Goals)
1980–1989	Fitzroy	146 (26)
- ^{1} Playing statistics correct to the end of 1989.

Career highlights
- Fitzroy Club Champion: 1984

Ross Thornton (23 October 1956 – 25 April 2024) was an Australian rules footballer who played with Fitzroy in the VFL during the 1980s.

Thornton originally arrived at Fitzroy from Hampden Football League club Camperdown in 1975 but was unable to make the senior team so joined Victorian Football Association club Prahran. He returned to Fitzroy in 1980 and became a regular fixture in their defence for the rest of the decade, usually occupying a back pocket from where he liked to run the ball up the ground. A personal highlight came in 1984 when Thornton won Fitzroy's Best and fairest award.

In 2003 Thornton was selected in Prahran's Team of the Century.

Thornton appeared on the second season of The Amazing Race Australia with his daughter Tarryn, and was eliminated in 8th place in Turkey on Episode 6.

In later years, Thornton was appointed to the Brisbane Lions Board.

Thornton died from cancer on 25 April 2024, at the age of 67.

== Sources ==
- Holmesby, Russell and Main, Jim (2007). The Encyclopedia of AFL Footballers. 7th ed. Melbourne: Bas Publishing.
