= Norm Johnstone =

Australian rules footballer

Personal information
- Full name: Norman Alfred Johnstone
- Born: 16 January 1927
- Died: 7 June 2013 (aged 86)
- Original team: Chelsea
- Height: 183 cm (6 ft 0 in)
- Weight: 92 kg (203 lb)

Playing career^{1}
Years	Club	Games (Goals)
1944–1957	Fitzroy	228 (185)
- ^{1} Playing statistics correct to the end of 1957.

Career highlights
- Fitzroy Club Champion: 1947; Fitzroy leading goalkicker: 1955; Fitzroy team of the century

Norman Alfred Johnstone (16 January 1927 – 7 June 2013) was an Australian rules footballer who played his entire 228 game career with the Fitzroy in the (then) VFL. He was a ruckman, but was capable of kicking goals when pushed into forward line.

== Playing career ==
Recruited from the Chelsea Seagulls Football Club, Norm Johnstone played his first game for Fitzroy as a 17-year-old. Heftily built at 183 cm and 92 kg, he was nevertheless extremely pacy and was not frightened of using his weight. Johnstone was considered by his peers as a very tough footballer, not afraid to use his physical strength when needed.

Always a reliable player, he won Fitzroy's best and fairest award in 1947, and was a VFL interstate representative in 1948. He played for most of his career as a ruckman, while his career tally of 195 goals attested to the fact that he was always dangerous when resting in the forward lines. His season's total of 32 goals in 1955 were good enough for him to lead Fitzroy's goal kicking list. Johnstone played in three finals games; in 1947 and 1952.

Johnstone retired at the end of the 1957 season after 14 seasons and 228 games, all with Fitzroy. His 228 games ranks 5th on Fitzroy's all-time playing list.

Johnstone was a supporter of the 1997 merger of Fitzroy and the Brisbane Bears and has continued to support the Brisbane Lions since the merger. He is the grandfather of former Brisbane Lions/Melbourne Demons footballer, Travis Johnstone.

== Career highlights ==
- On 3 May 2001, Johnstone was named in Fitzroy's Team of the Century, as a follower.
- In 2007, the Brisbane Lions recognised Johnstone as one of the ten greatest Lions players from the era 1927 to 1956.

Playing career:

- Fitzroy: 1944 – 57 (Games 228; Goals 185; Brownlow votes 39).

Player honors:

- Brownlow Medal: Equal 7th in 1949; Equal 8th in 1951; Equal 12th in 1955.
- Fitzroy best and fairest: 1947.
- Fitzroy leading goalkicker: 1955.
- Victorian representative: (1 game)

== See also ==
- Fitzroy FC honour roll
- Australian rules footballers with 200 games for one club
