= Alan Gale =

Australian rules footballer

- Butch Gale in 1961

Personal information
- Nickname: Butch
- Born: 8 September 1930
- Died: 24 March 1987 (aged 56)
- Original team: Police Boys' football team
- Height: 185 cm (6 ft 1 in)
- Weight: 91 kg (201 lb)

Playing career^{1}
Years	Club	Games (Goals)
1948–1961	Fitzroy	213 (19)
- ^{1} Playing statistics correct to the end of 1961.

Career highlights
- Fitzroy Team of the Century

Alan Gale, also known as Butch Gale (8 September 1930 – 24 March 1987), was an Australian rules footballer who played for Fitzroy in the VFL during the 1950s.

== Career ==
Gale made his league debut in 1948, at the age of just 17, after being recruited from the Police Boys' football club. His early games suggested that he was little more than an honest trier. However, as his career entered into the 1950s, Gale elevated his performances to a new, higher level. During this period, Gale finished runner-up in the clubs best and fairest award a record seven times, but never won, depriving him of an opportunity to be remembered as a great player on Fitzroy's honour board.

Some of Gale's best football came while resting in defence, and he would undoubtedly have made a fine key position defender had Fitzroy been able to spare him from the ruck.

Gale captained Fitzroy from 1958 until his retirement in 1961. He also represented Victoria in interstate football, leading them in 1959. He was named in Fitzroy's official 'Team of the Century'.

Following his retirement, Gale became a commentator on HSV7, partnering with Mike Williamson and Ted Whitten on match commentary through the 1960s and 1970s. Gale collapsed and died of a heart attack while addressing Fitzroy players in the week prior to the opening game of the 1987 VFL season.

== Career highlights ==
- On 3 May 2001, Gale was named in Fitzroy's Team of the Century, as the ruckman.
- In 2007, The Brisbane Lions recognised Gale as one of the ten greatest Lions players from the era 1957 to 1966.

Playing career:

- Fitzroy 1948–1961 (Games 213; Goals 19; Brownlow votes 30)

Player honors:

- 12th Brownlow Medal 1957.
- Fitzroy captain: 1958 to 1961.
- Fitzroy Best & Fairest runner-up: 7 times
- Victorian representative: 12 games

== See also ==
- Fitzroy FC honour roll
- Australian rules footballers with 200 games for one club
