= John Murphy (Australian rules footballer) =

Australian rules footballer

Personal information
- Full name: John Murphy
- Born: 20 November 1949 (age 76)
- Original team: Heidelberg (DVFL)
- Height: 183 cm (6 ft 0 in)
- Weight: 83 kg (183 lb)

Playing career^{1}
| Years | Club | Games (Goals) |
| 1967–1977 | Fitzroy | 214 (326) |
| 1978–1979 | South Melbourne | 23 (40) |
| 1979–1980 | North Melbourne | 9 (8) |
| Total | | 246 (374) |
- ^{1} Playing statistics correct to the end of 1980.

Career highlights
- Fitzroy captain: 1973–1977; 5× Fitzroy Club Champion: 1968, 1970, 1971, 1973, 1977; Bob Skilton Medal: 1978; Fitzroy leading goalkicker: 1971, 1976; South Melbourne leading goalkicker: 1978

John Murphy (born 20 November 1949) is a former Australian rules footballer who played in the Victorian Football League (now AFL).

== Playing career ==
Murphy debuted with the Fitzroy Football Club in 1967 after being recruited from Diamond Valley Football League club Heidelberg, and went on to set the record for consecutive games played from debut -158 matches. This record held until 2005 when surpassed by Jared Crouch from Sydney.

Murphy was made captain of Fitzroy in 1973, a position he held until he left the club at the end of the 1977 season after 214 games and winning five Fitzroy Club Champions across half-forward and in the midfield. His departure was due to internal disputes with the club over his comments over some players that he thought should have been discarded from the club.

In 1978, he moved to South Melbourne playing 23 games in a season and a half. He again changed clubs late in the 1979 season, moving to North Melbourne where he played his first ever finals match. He retired from the VFL in 1980 after injuries struck.

In 1981, Murphy moved to Tasmania to captain-coach the Ulverstone in the North Western Football Union. He won the Wander Medal as the league's best and fairest.

Following his playing career, Murphy had two coaching stints in the VFA/VFL. He coached Werribee briefly from 1983 until 1985, without much success. Then, from 1993 to 1998, John Murphy was coach of the Box Hill Football Club and is the club's longest serving coach. He coached the club to its first Division One grand final in the VFA in 1994, in which Box Hill was defeated by Sandringham by the narrow margin of 9 points. He received life membership of the Box Hill Football Club in 1998.

Murphy currently works as the Dispute Settlement Officer in the Mornington Peninsula Nepean Football League.

He was inducted into the Australian Football Hall of Fame in 2006 and is the centreman in Fitzroy's official "Team of the Century".

== Post-football ==
When Fitzroy's official 'Team of the Century' was announced in 2002, he was named in the centre. Murphy was admitted to the Australian Football Hall of Fame on 22 June 2006.

His son, Marc Murphy, was the number one draft pick in the 2005 AFL draft. Marc considered a move to the Brisbane Lions under the father–son rule, as John played for Fitzroy, a club that merged with the Brisbane Bears to form the Lions. However, he nominated for the National Draft instead, and was selected by Carlton with the first overall selection.

After Marc's 100th game in 2010, Marc, John and John's father Leo Murphy (who played 132 games for Hawthorn in the 1930s) became the only father–son–grandson combination in league history to each play 100 games.
