= Ralph Rogerson =

Australian rules footballer

Personal information
- Full name: Ralph Rogerson
- Born: 24 February 1937 (age 89)
- Original team: North Adelaide
- Height: 189 cm (6 ft 2 in)
- Weight: 86 kg (190 lb)
- Position: Centre half forward

Playing career^{1}
Years	Club	Games (Goals)
1964–66	Fitzroy	39 (54)
- ^{1} Playing statistics correct to the end of 1966.

Ralph Rogerson (born 24 February 1937) is a former Australian rules footballer who played for Fitzroy in the Victorian Football League (VFL) during the 1960s.

Rogerson started his career in the South Australian National Football League, where he played with North Adelaide. A key position forward, he represented South Australia at the 1958 Melbourne Carnival. He then ventured to Western Australia and joined East Perth and appeared in their losing 1961 West Australian National Football League Grand Final team.

His VFL stint began in 1964 and he took part in each of Fitzroy's 18 games that season, all of which they lost. He kicked 27 goals for the year, which was enough to top the Fitzroy goal-kicking. Rogerson replaced Kevin Murray as captain in 1965 and had another good season with 24 goals. He continued as captain in 1966 until injury forced him to retire mid year.

He did however turn out for Waverley later that season and participated in the 1966 Victorian Football Association Grand Final loss to Port Melbourne.
