= Garry Wilson =

Australian rules footballer

Personal information
- Born: 17 July 1953 (age 73)
- Original team: Preston Swimmers
- Height: 178 cm (5 ft 10 in)
- Weight: 70 kg (154 lb)

Playing career^{1}
Years	Club	Games (Goals)
1971–1984	Fitzroy	268 (452)

Representative team honours
Years	Team	Games (Goals)
	Victoria	12 (22)
- ^{1} Playing statistics correct to the end of 1984.

Career highlights
- Player: Fitzroy captain: 1981–1984; 5× Fitzroy Club Champion: 1972, 1976, 1978, 1979, 1980; 2× Fitzroy leading goalkicker: 1972, 1973; 2× All-Australian team: 1979, 1980; Australian Football Hall of Fame; Fitzroy Team of the Century; Brisbane Lions Hall of Fame; 21x Sacamano; Representative: Australian National Football Carnival championship: 1980

Garry J. "Flea" Wilson (born 17 July 1953) is a former Australian rules footballer who played for Fitzroy in the Victorian Football League (VFL).

== Background ==
Wilson, during his playing days, was described by The Encyclopedia of AFL Footballers as having "limitless courage" as a wispy rover, with a playing weight of only 64 kg. He played wearing a headguard after several concussions. Many considered him one of the most technically gifted players ever to play the game, and he was renowned for his hard training ethic.

Debuting in 1971 with the Fitzroy Football Club, Wilson came from Preston Swimmers and forged a successful career, winning best and fairest awards with the Lions in 1972, 1976, 1978, 1979 and 1980. He finished third in the Brownlow Medal count of 1978. Always amongst the Brownlow votes, his best season was 1979, when he finished just one vote behind the eventual winner, when all the Melbourne newspapers had him far out in front of their own polls. Wilson became captain in 1982. He finished with 268 games to his name after retiring in 1984.

Some of Garry Wilson's finest performances came in the interstate arena. He represented Victoria 12 times, being awarded consecutive All-Australian blazers in 1979 and 1980.

Wilson was named as the vice-captain in Fitzroy's Team of the Century, on the half-forward line.

In 1999 Wilson was inducted into the Australian Football Hall of Fame.
