= Horrie Jenkin =

Australian rules footballer (1893–1985)

Personal information
- Full name: Horace Valentine Jenkin
- Born: 14 February 1893; Collingwood, Victoria
- Died: 17 January 1985 (aged 91); Preston, Victoria
- Original team: Northcote City
- Height: 178 cm (5 ft 10 in)
- Weight: 73 kg (161 lb)

Playing career^{1}
Years	Club	Games (Goals)
1916–1928	Fitzroy	168 (22)
- ^{1} Playing statistics correct to the end of 1928.

Career highlights
- 2× VFL premierships: 1916, 1922; Fitzroy Club Champion: 1926

Horace Valentine Jenkin (14 February 1893 – 17 January 1985) was an Australian rules footballer who played with Fitzroy in the VFL.

A defender, Jenkin was a member of Fitzroy premiership teams in 1916 and 1922. He started his career at full forward but played his best football as a defender, winning the club's best and fairest award in 1926.
