= Scott McIvor =

Australian rules footballer

Personal information
- Born: 9 August 1966 (age 60); Brisbane, Queensland
- Original team: Wilston Grange (QAFL)
- Height: 191 cm (6 ft 3 in)
- Weight: 87 kg (192 lb)

Playing career^{1}
Years	Club	Games (Goals)
1985–1987	Fitzroy	55 (15)
1988–1996	Brisbane Bears	138 (77)
1997	Brisbane Lions	7 (4)
Total		200 (96)
- ^{1} Playing statistics correct to the end of 1997.

Career highlights
- Mitchell Medal: 1987; Queensland State of Origin player

Scott McIvor (born 9 August 1966) is a former Australian rules footballer. He made his V/AFL debut with Fitzroy in 1985 but played the majority of his career in his home state of Queensland with both the Brisbane Bears and Brisbane Lions.

Born in Brisbane, Queensland, McIvor played his junior football for Wilston Grange. Prior to starting his VFL career, McIvor captained his home state Queensland in the Teal Cup. At the age of 17, he was recruited by Fitzroy and finished second in their 1986 best and fairest before winning it in 1987.

The following season, he returned home to Queensland and joined the Brisbane Bears who were playing just their second season in the AFL. McIvor remained with the club for ten seasons until they merged with Fitzroy for the 1997 season. He finished with 138 games for the Bears; only Roger Merrett and Marcus Ashcroft managed more. He spent just the one season with the newly formed Lions before an injury forced him to retire.

After Fitzroy and Brisbane combined their respective histories in 2001, the club unveiled a new 200 game honor board at the Gabba which included Fitzroy, Brisbane, and Brisbane Lion players. The board was hung in the players' rooms with a replica for the members' area. The board itself was named the 'Curcio-McIvor' board, in honor of past players Frank Curcio and Scott McIvor.

In 2003, he was named as a wingman in the Queensland Team of the Century.
