= Matt Rendell =

Australian rules footballer (1959–2023)

Personal information
- Full name: Matthew Rendell
- Born: 18 April 1959
- Died: 28 June 2023 (aged 64); Melbourne, Victoria, Australia
- Original team: West Torrens
- Draft: 76th overall, 1991 National Draft
- Height: 200 cm (6 ft 7 in)
- Weight: 103 kg (227 lb)
- Position: Ruckman

Playing career^{1}
Years	Club	Games (Goals)
1977–1980	West Torrens	79 (39)
1981–1991	Fitzroy	164 (101)
1992	Brisbane Bears	13 (7)
Total		256 (147)
- ^{1} Playing statistics correct to the end of 1992.

Career highlights
- Fitzroy captain: 1985–1987; Fitzroy Club Champion: 1982, 1983; All-Australian team: 1983, 1987

Matthew Rendell (18 April 1959 – 28 June 2023) was an Australian rules footballer who played in the Australian Football League and South Australian National Football League (SANFL).

== Biography ==
Rendell played as a ruckman and made his debut with the West Torrens Football Club in the SANFL in 1977 where he played 79 games. He left South Australia in 1981 to play with the Fitzroy Football Club in the VFL, wearing the No. 9 guernsey. In his first year, he played mainly at full forward and kicked forty-five goals, but he admitted in later years he did not enjoy it. With the return of Ron Alexander to Western Australia, however, Rendell was to make the ruck position his own, barring injuries, until 1987. Rendell did have quite a number of injuries, however, after 1983, with the result that he played only 26 of 43 games in 1984 and 1985.

Rendell won Fitzroy's 1982 and 1983 best and fairest awards, and was appointed captain from 1985 to 1987. In one game, Rendell, who had not kicked a goal in his previous seventeen games for Fitzroy, was used as a seventh forward to counter North Melbourne's Gary Dempsey's habit of marking in the last line of defence; as a result of this strategy, Rendell kicked eight goals and the Lions won the game by 150 points, which at the time more than doubled the previous biggest loss by a minor premier.

Rendell played just one game with the Lions in 1988, the rest of the year spent in the reserves, which Rendell put down to a misunderstanding with coach David Parkin. He played 18 games in 1989 and played well enough throughout the season to secure four Brownlow votes in a drive to the finals that was deflated by an injury to top forward Richard Osborne.

Rendell retired at the end of 1991 after 164 games and 101 goals with Fitzroy. However, he soon reversed that decision and moved to the Brisbane Bears, who persuaded him to continue playing. He did so in his final year in 1992, playing 13 games and booting seven goals for the Bears before retiring for good.

Rendell was an assistant coach and match-day tactician with the St Kilda Football Club, alongside Grant Thomas, until he was sacked at the end of 2006 with the appointment of Ross Lyon. In 2007, he returned to South Australia, joining the Adelaide Football Club as their recruitment manager. Rendell resigned as Adelaide's recruiting manager on 16 March 2012 following issues around reported comments in relation to the recruitment of Indigenous players. He was later, with the AFL's permission, hired by Collingwood as part of their recruiting department. In 2015 he also took up the part-time task of coaching Collingwood's ruckmen.

Rendell's brother Tim was a promising ruckman who also played for West Torrens and was recruited by Fitzroy; however, Tim did not play a game due to chronic injury.

Matt Rendell died on the afternoon of 28 June 2023, after suffering a cardiac arrest on 25 June while walking his dog. He was 64.
