= Scott Clayton =

Australian rules footballer

Personal information
- Born: 13 November 1959 (age 66)
- Original team: Hobart
- Height: 185 cm (6 ft 1 in)
- Weight: 88 kg (194 lb)

Playing career^{1}
Years	Club	Games (Goals)
1981–1990	Fitzroy	160 (23)
- ^{1} Playing statistics correct to the end of 1990.

Career highlights
- Mitchell Medal: 1990

Scott Clayton (born 13 November 1959) is a former Australian rules footballer who played for Fitzroy in the Victorian Football League (VFL) during the 1980s.

A tagger from Hobart, Clayton started his career with Fitzroy in 1981 and often played on key opposition players. He won Fitzroy's best and fairest award in 1990, his last season in the VFL.

Scott went on to become a recruitment manager for a number of AFL clubs, including the Brisbane Bears, Brisbane Lions, Western Bulldogs and the Gold Coast Suns.
