= Harold McLennan =

Australian rules footballer

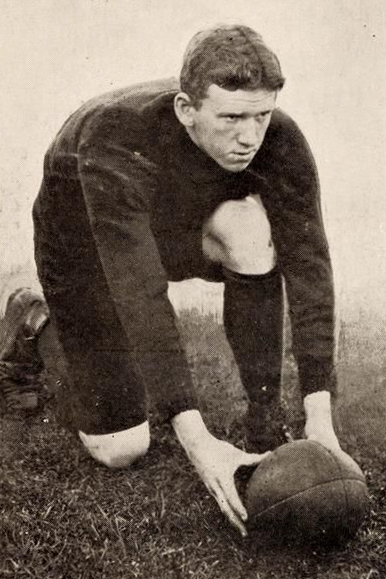
- McLennan in 1910

Personal information
- Full name: Harold Francis McLennan
- Nickname: Lal
- Born: 26 July 1888; Ballarat, Victoria
- Died: 20 September 1978 (aged 90); Melbourne, Victoria
- Original team: North Fitzroy Juniors
- Height: 178 cm (5 ft 10 in)
- Weight: 74 kg (163 lb)
- Position: Midfielder

Playing career^{1}
Years	Club	Games (Goals)
1907–16, 1919	Fitzroy	135 (22)

Representative team honours^{2}
Years	Team	Games (Goals)
1913	Victoria	1 (0)
- ^{1} Playing statistics correct to the end of 1919.^{2} Representative statistics correct as of 1913.

Career highlights
- 2× VFL premierships: 1913, 1916; Fitzroy captain: 1911; 2× Fitzroy Club Champion: 1912, 1913

Harold Francis "Lal" McLennan (26 July 1888 – 20 September 1978) was an Australian rules footballer who played with Fitzroy in the Victorian Football League (VFL).

McLennan was a centreman and captained Fitzroy in the 1911 season. In both 1912 and 1913, he was Fitzroy's Club Champion, the latter in a premiership side. He was a premiership winner again in 1916.
