= Bill Cleary (Australian footballer) =

Australian rules footballer (1868–1942)

Personal information
- Full name: William Cleary
- Born: 20 February 1868; Ballarat East, Victoria
- Died: 27 January 1942 (aged 73); Kew, Victoria
- Original team: South Ballarat
- Height: 177 cm (5 ft 10 in)
- Weight: 68 kg (150 lb)

Playing career^{1}
Years	Club	Games (Goals)
1886–1887	South Ballarat	29 (6)
1888–1896	Fitzroy (VFA)	152 (44)
1897–1899	Fitzroy	21 (6)
Total		202 (56)
- ^{1} Playing statistics correct to the end of 1899.

Career highlights
- VFA premiership player: 1895; VFL premiership player: 1899

William 'Bice' Cleary (20 February 1868 – 27 January 1942) was an Australian rules footballer who played for the Fitzroy Football Club in the Victorian Football League (VFL).

Cleary came from South Ballarat, and after two seasons crossed to Fitzroy. He was vice captain in 1894–1896, and after Tom Banks retired, was 28 when he captained Fitzroy in the inaugural VFL season. He resigned the captaincy, which went to Alec Sloan the following season.

His final game was as a forward pocket in Fitzroy's 1899 Grand Final triumph, having come into the side towards the end of the season after not playing for over a year.
