= Fred Chanter =

Australian rules footballer

Personal information
- Full name: Frederick William Chanter
- Born: 25 September 1892; Wagga Wagga, New South Wales
- Died: 25 May 1962 (aged 69); Alphington, Victoria
- Height: 187 cm (6 ft 2 in)
- Weight: 85 kg (187 lb)

Playing career^{1}
Years	Club	Games (Goals)
1920	Fitzroy	1 (0)
- ^{1} Playing statistics correct to the end of 1920.

Frederick William Chanter (25 September 1892 – 25 May 1962) was an Australian rules footballer who played with Fitzroy in the Victorian Football League (VFL).
