= Neville Broderick =

Australian rules footballer

Personal information
- Born: 10 April 1927
- Died: 17 February 1994 (aged 66)
- Original teams: St Josephs, Collingwood
- Height: 175 cm (5 ft 9 in)
- Weight: 86 kg (190 lb)

Playing career^{1}
Years	Club	Games (Goals)
1949–1951	Collingwood	24 (3)
1952–1954	Fitzroy	50 (3)
Total		74 (6)
- ^{1} Playing statistics correct to the end of 1954.

Career highlights
- Fitzroy Club Champion: 1952

Neville Broderick (10 April 1927 – 17 February 1994) was an Australian rules footballer who played with Collingwood and Fitzroy in the Victorian Football League (VFL).

== Early career ==
Broderick was a defender and spent three seasons at Collingwood. He crossed to Fitzroy in 1952 and won their Best and fairest in his debut season with the club.

== Tasmania ==
In 1955 Broderick moved to Tasmania being cleared to Wynyard to take on the role of captain-coach. He also won that club's Best and Fairest award in 1958.
