= Herbert Milne =

Australian rules footballer

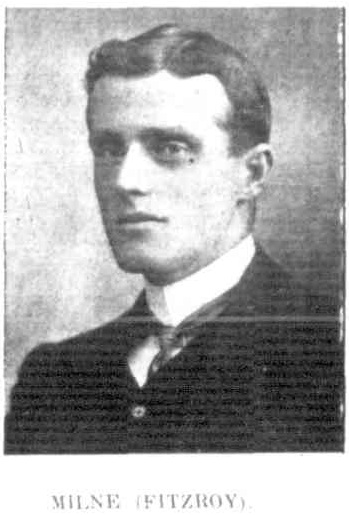
- Milne in 1907

Personal information
- Full name: Herbert Eric Day Milne
- Nickname: Boxer
- Born: 8 February 1884; Benalla, Victoria
- Died: 20 December 1930 (aged 46); Colombo, Sri Lanka
- Height: 183 cm (6 ft 0 in)
- Weight: 76 kg (168 lb)
- Position: Midfielder

Playing career^{1}
| Years | Club | Games (Goals) |
| 1902–1910 | Fitzroy | 122 (69) |
| 1911–1912 | South Melbourne | 31 (14) |
| Total | | 153 (83) |

Representative team honours^{2}
| Years | Team | Games (Goals) |
| 1908 | Victoria | 3 (1) |
- ^{1} Playing statistics correct to the end of 1912.^{2} Representative statistics correct as of 1908.

Career highlights
- 2× VFL premiership player: 1904, 1905; 2× Fitzroy Club Champion: 1908, 1910

Herbert "Boxer" Milne (8 February 1884 – 20 December 1930) was an Australian rules footballer who played for the Fitzroy Football Club and South Melbourne Football Club in the Victorian Football League (VFL) during the early 1900s.

== Family ==
The son of John Milne (1855-1921), and Mary Lavinia Milne, née Landorf, Herbert Milne was born at Benalla, Victoria on 8 February 1884.

One of his two brothers, Hector Norman Milne (1880-1960), who played two seasons (1899-1900) with Richmond and two seasons with North Melbourne (1902-1903) in the VFA, enlisted in the First AIF (Service no.953) and lost an eye from a bayonet wound whilst serving.

== Football ==
=== Fitzroy ===
A follower, Milne had a distinguished career at Fitzroy where he won best and fairest awards in both 1908 and 1910. As part of a strong Fitzroy side he played in four successive Grand Finals, winning back to back flags in 1904 and 1905. He was also a Victorian interstate representative and appeared in the Australasian Championship, which took place at Melbourne in 1908.

=== South Melbourne ===
Milne crossed to South Melbourne in 1911.

"After an internal political dispute in the summer of [late] 1910, Milne was one of ten Fitzroy players to leave for other clubs." — Donald (2005), p.59.

In 1912, he played in their Grand Final loss to Essendon. He suffered a knee injury in this game and retired as a result.

== Military service ==
Milne enlisted in the First AIF in July 1915, and served overseas with the 14th Field Ambulance. In late 1917 suffered serious wounds when hit by machine gun bullets in his left thigh.

== Death ==
An employee of the Vacuum Oil Company, he died at sea near Colombo, Sri Lanka when returning to Australia on the P & O's S.S. Moldavia, from a business trip to England. He was buried at sea, near Columbo.

== See also ==
- 1908 Melbourne Carnival
