= George Lambert (footballer) =

Australian rules footballer

Personal information
- Full name: George Henry Lambert
- Born: 9 September 1887; Fitzroy, Victoria
- Died: 20 March 1938 (aged 50); Kew East, Victoria
- Original team: Abbotsford
- Height: 170 cm (5 ft 7 in)
- Weight: 67 kg (148 lb)

Playing career^{1}
Years	Club	Games (Goals)
1909–1917	Fitzroy	107 (5)
- ^{1} Playing statistics correct to the end of 1917.

Career highlights
- Fitzroy Club Champion: 1909

George 'Snowy' Lambert (9 September 1887 – 20 March 1938) was an Australian rules footballer who played for Fitzroy in the early years of the VFL.

A half back flanker, Lambert played with Fitzroy for nine seasons and won their best and fairest award in his first season, sharing it with Bill Walker. He struggled to hold his place in the side during the second half of his career and missed out on playing in both of the two premierships Fitzroy won while he was at the club.
