= Mitchell Medal =

The Mitchell Medal was the best and fairest award for the Fitzroy Football Club in the Australian Football League (AFL).

Percy Mitchell was a long-serving club administrator and life member and the award was named after him in 1987.

== Recipients ==
+	Player won Brownlow Medal in same season

Season	Recipient(s)
1897	—N/a
1898	Mick Grace
1899	Pat Hickey
1900	Mick Grace (2)
1901	—N/a
1902	—N/a
1903	Percy Trotter
1904	Jim Sharp
1905	Les Millis
1906	Les Millis (2)
1907	Barclay Bailes
1907	Wally Johnson
1908	George Holden
1908	Herbert Milne
1909	George Lambert
1909	Bill Walker
1910	Herbert Milne (2)
1911	Jack Cooper
1912	Harold McLennan
1913	Harold McLennan (2)
1914	Jack Cooper (2)
1915	George Holden (2)
1916	—N/a
1917	—N/a
1918	Jimmy Freake
1919	Gordon Rattray
1920	Len Wigraft
1921	Gordon Rattray (2)
1922	Jim Atkinson
1923	Goldie Collins
1924	Len Wigraft (2)
1925	Len Wigraft (3)
1926	Horrie Jenkin
1927	Jack Moriarty
1928	—N/a
1929	Arthur Batchelor
1930	—N/a
1931	—N/a
1932	—N/a
1933	—N/a
1934	Haydn Bunton
1935	Haydn Bunton+ (2)
1936	—N/a
1937	—N/a
1938	—N/a
1939	—N/a
1940	—N/a
1941	—N/a
1942	—N/a
1943	Fred Hughson
1944	Allan Ruthven
1945	Allan Ruthven (2)
1946	Allan Ruthven (3)
1947	Norm Johnstone
1948	Allan Ruthven (4)
1949	Allan Ruthven (5)
1950	Bill Stephen
1951	Vic Chanter
1952	Neville Broderick
1953	Don Furness
1954	Bill Stephen (2)
1955	Don Furness (2)
1956	Kevin Murray
1957	Graham Campbell
1958	Kevin Murray (2)
1959	Ron Harvey
1960	Kevin Murray (3)
1961	Kevin Murray (4)
1962	Kevin Murray (5)
1963	Kevin Murray (6)
1964	Kevin Murray (7)
1965	Norm Brown
1966	Norm Brown (2)
1967	Norm Brown (3)
1968	John Murphy
1968	Kevin Murray (8)
1969	Kevin Murray+ (9)
1970	John Murphy (2)
1971	John Murphy (3)
1972	Garry Wilson
1973	John Murphy (4)
1974	Harvey Merrigan
1975	Warwick Irwin
1976	Garry Wilson (2)
1977	John Murphy (5)
1978	Garry Wilson (3)
1979	Garry Wilson (4)
1980	Garry Wilson (5)
1981	Ron Alexander
1982	Matt Rendell
1983	Matt Rendell (2)
1984	Ross Thornton
1985	Paul Roos
1986	Paul Roos (2)
1987	Scott McIvor
1988	Darren Kappler
1989	Gary Pert
1990	Scott Clayton
1991	Paul Roos (3)
1992	Paul Roos (4)
1993	Alastair Lynch
1994	Paul Roos (5)
1995	Brad Boyd
1996	Martin Pike

== Multiple winners ==
Player	Medals	Seasons
Kevin Murray	9	1956, 1958, 1960, 1961, 1962, 1963, 1964, 1968, 1969
John Murphy	5	1968, 1970, 1971, 1973, 1977
Paul Roos	5	1985, 1986, 1991, 1992, 1994
Allan Ruthven	5	1944, 1945, 1946, 1948, 1949
Garry Wilson	5	1972, 1976, 1978, 1979, 1980
Norm Brown	3	1965, 1966, 1967
Len Wigraft	3	1920, 1924, 1925
Haydn Bunton	2	1934, 1935
Jack Cooper	2	1911, 1914
Don Furness	2	1953, 1955
Mick Grace	2	1898, 1900
George Holden	2	1908, 1915
Harold McLennan	2	1912, 1913
Les Millis	2	1905, 1906
Herbert Milne	2	1908, 1910
Gordon Rattray	2	1919, 1921
Matt Rendell	2	1982, 1983
Bill Stephen	2	1950, 1954
