= Brad Boyd =

Australian rules footballer

Personal information
- Full name: Brad Boyd
- Born: 10 August 1971 (age 55)
- Original team: Collingwood Under 19s
- Height: 186 cm (6 ft 1 in)
- Weight: 86 kg (190 lb)

Playing career^{1}
Years	Club	Games (Goals)
1992–1996	Fitzroy	70 (49)
1997–1999	Brisbane Lions	15 (8)
Total		85 (57)
- ^{1} Playing statistics correct to the end of 1999.

Career highlights
- Fitzroy Captain: 1995–1996; Mitchell Medal: 1995

Brad Boyd (born 10 August 1971) is a former Australian rules footballer who played for Fitzroy and the Brisbane Lions in the Australian Football League during the 1990s.

Boyd started his AFL career in 1992 with Fitzroy and played mainly as a ruck-rover, although he was also used as a half back flanker and at centre half-forward. He was a best and fairest winner in 1995, his first season as captain. Also in 1995 he represented Victoria in State of Origin. He was also captain in 1996 and thus has the distinction of being Fitzroy's last AFL captain. In 1997, he joined the newly formed Brisbane Lions for their inaugural season. He was the club's first signing.
