= Warwick Irwin =

Australian rules footballer

Personal information
- Born: 3 June 1952 (age 74)
- Original team: Surrey Hills
- Height: 182 cm (6 ft 0 in)
- Weight: 80 kg (176 lb)

Playing career^{1}
Years	Club	Games (Goals)
1970–1980	Fitzroy	206 (225)
1981	Collingwood	16 (16)
1983	Fitzroy	7 (3)
Total		229 (244)
- ^{1} Playing statistics correct to the end of 1983.

Career highlights
- Fitzroy Club Champion: 1975

Warwick Irwin (born 3 June 1952) is a former Australian rules footballer who played for Fitzroy and Collingwood in the Victorian Football League (VFL). A rover, he won the club's best and fairest award in 1975. Irwin also features in the Fitzroy Team of the Century.

He is now a physical education teacher and lead co-ordinator at Mount Waverley Secondary College.
