= Les Millis =

Australian rules footballer (1881–1950)

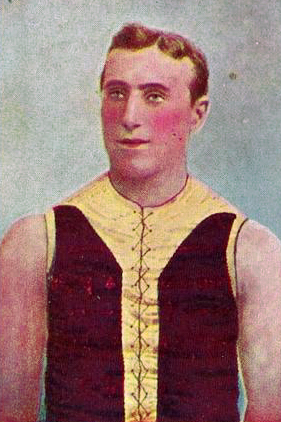
- Cigarette card of Millis in 1905

Personal information
- Full name: Leslie Norman Millis
- Born: 18 June 1881; Fitzroy, Victoria
- Died: 7 April 1950 (aged 68); Carlton, Victoria
- Original team: Fitzroy Juniors
- Position: Rover

Playing career^{1}
Years	Club	Games (Goals)
1903–1909	Fitzroy	126 (76)
- ^{1} Playing statistics correct to the end of 1909.

Career highlights
- 2× VFL premiership player: 1904, 1905; 2× Fitzroy Club Champion: 1905, 1906

Leslie Millis (18 June 1881 – 7 April 1950) was an Australian rules footballer who played for the Fitzroy Football Club in the Victorian Football League (VFL). He usually played on the wing or as a rover.

Millis won back-to-back premierships with the club in 1904 and 1905, the latter as Fitzroy's best and fairest. Millis won the award again the following season.
