= Gordon Rattray =

Australian rules footballer and coach

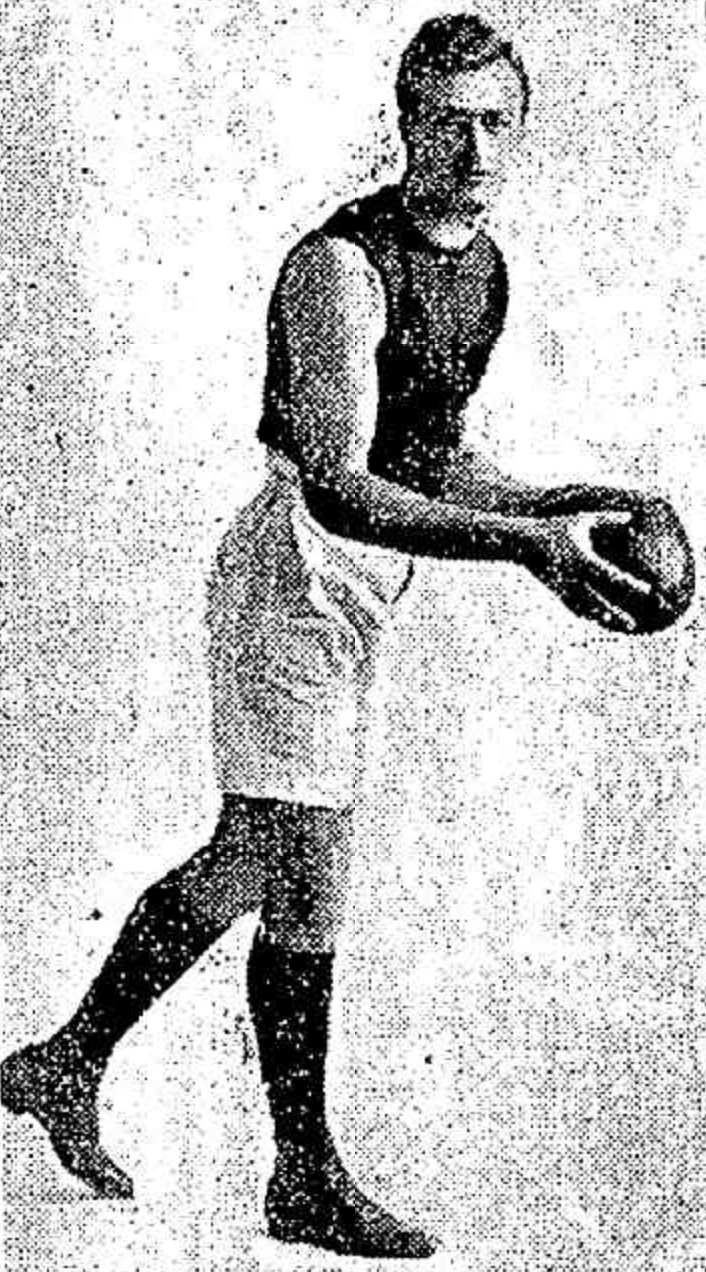
- Rattray in 1922

Personal information
- Full name: Gordon Kitchener Rattray
- Born: 19 October 1898; Shepparton, Victoria
- Died: 10 December 1964 (aged 66); Sandringham, Victoria
- Original team: Wesley College
- Height: 180 cm (5 ft 11 in)
- Weight: 76 kg (168 lb)
- Position: Half-forward flank

Playing career^{1}
Years	Club	Games (Goals)
1917–1924, 1928	Fitzroy	87 (65)

Coaching career
Years	Club	Games (W–L–D)
1924	Melbourne	16 (4–12–0)
1928, 1937–1939	Fitzroy	72 (25–46–1)
Total		88 (29–58–1)
- ^{1} Playing statistics correct to the end of 1928.

Career highlights
- VFL premiership: 1922; Fitzroy captain: 1923, 1928; 2× Fitzroy Club Champion: 1919, 1921

Gordon Kitchener Rattray (19 October 1898 – 10 December 1964) was an Australian rules footballer who played with and coached Fitzroy in the Victorian Football League (VFL). He was the first VFL player to use the torpedo punt.

== Family ==
The son of Bruce Rattray (1860–1932) and Laura Rattray, née Barratt, Gordon Kitchener Rattray was born at Shepparton on 19 October 1898.

He married Janet Elizabeth Wharton on 29 June 1922. They were divorced in 1938. He married Sylvia Catherine Burnet (1904–1980) in 1939.

== Education ==
He was educated at Wesley College.

== Military service ==
He enlisted in the First AIF on 21 April 1917. He was only 18 years and 6 months of age (i.e., under 21), but his parents gave formal permission to his enlisting and serving overseas. He served in France, returned to Australia on 2 January 1919, and was discharged on 2 March 1919.

== Football ==
=== Fitzroy (VFL) ===
A half-forward flanker, Rattray debuted for Fitzroy in 1917, but his progress was stalled when he missed the following season due to military service. Rattray came back to the club in 1919 and won their best and fairest trophy. He won it again in 1921 and was a premiership player in 1922. In 1923, he became club captain and led them to the Grand Final, which they lost to Essendon.

=== Melbourne (VFL) ===
In 1924, he was appointed as the playing-coach of the Melbourne Football Club. He was, however, still residentially tied to Fitzroy and thus ineligible to play for Melbourne. He served the entire season as Melbourne's non-playing coach.

=== Fitzroy (VFL) ===
Melbourne failed to make the Finals in 1924; and, consequently, Rattray was able to return to Fitzroy as a player for one Finals match, the second of the club's Round Robin Semi-Final matches against Richmond on 20 September 1924.

=== Brighton (VFA) ===
He left Fitzroy after the 1924 season, and, having been originally chosen to be the playing−coach of North Melbourne in its inaugural VFL season, he was granted a clearance to serve as the captain-coach of Brighton in the Victorian Football Association (VFA).

He played 53 games and kicked 39 goals in his three years at Brighton (1925–1927). Under his coaching, Brighton played in both the 1926 Grand Final, with Rattray at centre half-back, and the 1927 VFA Grand Final, with Rattray at centre half-forward. On both occasions, Brighton lost to Coburg.

=== Fitzroy (VFL) ===
In 1928, he returned to Fitzroy and played his final season, as captain-coach.

=== VFL Representative player ===
During his career, he represented Victoria at interstate football five times.

== Death ==
He died at his home in Sandringham, Victoria, on 10 December 1964.
