= Fred Davies (footballer, born 1908) =

Australian rules footballer, born 1908

Personal information
- Full name: Frederick Davies
- Born: 12 March 1908; Sydney, New South Wales
- Died: 16 June 1978 (aged 70); Penshurst, New South Wales
- Original team: Eastern Suburbs
- Height: 180 cm (5 ft 11 in)
- Weight: 75 kg (165 lb)

Playing career^{1}
Years	Club	Games (Goals)
1930–1934	Fitzroy	63 (11)
- ^{1} Playing statistics correct to the end of 1934.

Fred Davies (12 March 1908 – 16 June 1978) was an Australian rules footballer who played with Fitzroy in the Victorian Football League (VFL).

A New South Welshman, Davies arrived at Fitzroy from Sydney club Eastern Suburbs. Davies returned to the state at the end of the 1934 VFL season, joining St George, a team he would both captain and coach. He had been captain of Fitzroy for most of 1934, promoted when original captain Jack Cashman moved to Carlton after the opening two rounds.

== See also ==
- 1927 Melbourne Carnival
