= Percy Parratt =

Australian rules footballer and coach

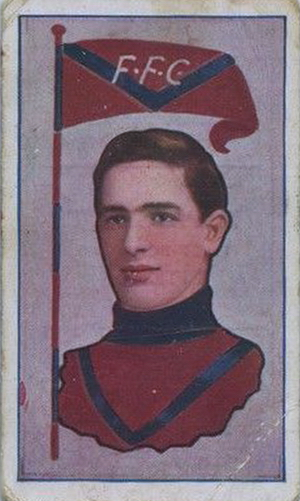
- Cigarette card of Parratt in 1912

Personal information
- Full name: Percy Thomas Parratt
- Born: 27 February 1887; Collingwood, Victoria
- Died: 1 May 1971 (aged 84); Heidelberg, Victoria
- Height: 178 cm (5 ft 10 in) / 74k g

Playing career^{1}
Years	Club	Games (Goals)
1909–1923	Fitzroy	195 (202)

Coaching career^{3}
Years	Club	Games (W–L–D)
1913–1915; 1920–1921	Fitzroy	91 (62–26–3)
1924	Carlton	16 (5–10–1)
1935	Geelong	18 (6–11–1)
Total		125 (74–47–5)
- ^{1} Playing statistics correct to the end of 1923.^{3} Coaching statistics correct as of 1935.

Career highlights
- Fitzroy premiership playing coach 1913; Fitzroy premiership player 1916, 1922; Fitzroy captain 1914–1915, 1920–1921

Percy Thomas Parratt (27 February 1887 – 1 May 1971) was an Australian rules footballer who played 195 games for the Fitzroy Football Club in the Victorian Football League (VFL) from 1909 to 1923, kicking 202 goals.

== Football ==
He started out at Rose of Northcote.

After leaving the club he became coach of Carlton, which he led in the 1924 season.
