= Maurie Hearn =

Australian rules footballer

Personal information
- Full name: Maurice John Hearn
- Born: 5 December 1912; South Melbourne, Victoria
- Died: 7 December 2004 (aged 92); Port Fairy, Victoria
- Original teams: St Patrick's, East Melbourne
- Height: 183 cm (6 ft 0 in)
- Weight: 86 kg (190 lb)

Playing career^{1}
Years	Club	Games (Goals)
1932–1934	South Melbourne	8 (4)
1934–1944	Fitzroy	128 (87)
Total		136 (91)
- ^{1} Playing statistics correct to the end of 1944.

Maurice John Hearn (5 December 1912 – 7 December 2004) was an Australian rules footballer who played with South Melbourne and Fitzroy in the Victorian Football League (VFL).

A follower, Hearn started his career at South Melbourne but due to the team's success over three seasons he only managed 8 games. As a result, he moved to Fitzroy during the 1934 season and remained with the club for a decade. A knee injury the week prior to playing in the 1939 State of Origin, saw him take two years off. He worked in the merchant navy, travelling to Europe throughout the war. Returning from sea in 1941, he was approached by all teams apart from Collingwood. He returned to Fitzroy where he captained the club for the 1942 season and retired in 1944, his last game being Fitzroy's Grand Final win over Richmond. In 1945 he left to captain-coach Williamstown, and he led the club to the VFA premiership in 1945.
