= Bill Walker (Australian footballer, born 1883) =

Australian rules footballer

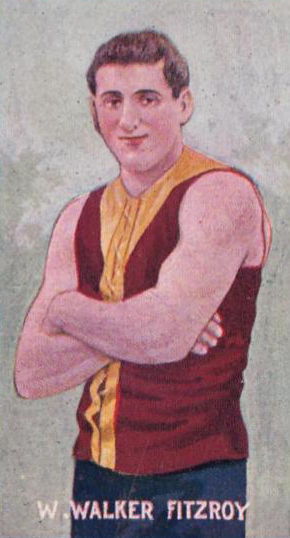
- Cigarette card of Walker in 1906

Personal information
- Full name: William John Walker
- Born: 25 May 1883; Sebastopol, Victoria
- Died: 17 July 1971 (aged 88); Windsor, Victoria
- Original team: Parkville Presbyterians
- Height: 179 cm (5 ft 10 in)
- Weight: 80 kg (176 lb)

Playing career^{1}
| Years | Club | Games (Goals) |
| 1903–1914 | Fitzroy | 169 (25) |
- ^{1} Playing statistics correct to the end of 1914.

Career highlights
- 3× VFL premiership player: 1904, 1905, 1913; Fitzroy captain: 1913; Fitzroy Club Champion: 1909

William John Walker (25 May 1883 – 17 July 1971) was an Australian rules footballer who played for the Fitzroy Football Club in the Victorian Football League (VFL).

A ruck shepherd, Walker was a best and fairest winner at Fitzroy in 1909. He was a member of premiership sides in 1904, 1905 and 1913, the latter as club captain. He was the last surviving player on either team from the 1906 VFL Grand Final.
