= Charles Cameron (footballer, born 1907) =

Australian rules footballer, born 1907

Charlie Cameron

Personal information
- Full name: Charles John Cameron
- Born: 22 November 1907; Collingwood, Victoria
- Died: 12 February 1960 (aged 51); Parkville, Victoria
- Original team: Thornbury CYMS (CYMSFA)
- Height: 172 cm (5 ft 8 in)
- Weight: 66 kg (146 lb)
- Position: Wing

Playing career^{1}
Years	Club	Games (Goals)
1926–1934	North Melbourne	122 (19)
1934–1936	Fitzroy	23 (52)
Total		145 (71)

Representative team honours
Years	Team	Games (Goals)
	Victoria	11

Coaching career
Years	Club	Games (W–L–D)
1932	North Melbourne	4 (2–2–0)
1948	Fitzroy	19 (9–10–0)
Total		23 (11–12–0)
- ^{1} Playing statistics correct to the end of 1936.

Charles John Cameron (22 November 1907 – 12 February 1960) was an Australian rules footballer who played with North Melbourne and Fitzroy in the Victorian Football League (VFL).

Cameron, who played as a wingman, joined North Melbourne in just their second VFL season. While at North Melbourne he regularly represented the Victorian interstate side, appearing in a total of 11 games including at the 1930 Adelaide Carnival. He was North's playing coach for four games in 1932.

Dick Taylor was appointed captain-coach in 1932. He got suspended after a fiery game and was barred from coaching for 4 weeks. Charlie acted as caretaker coach during Taylor's absence.

During the 1934 season Cameron crossed to Fitzroy and was used as a forward, kicking 23 goals in his first season and 24 in his second. He captained the club in 1935 and later, in 1948, returned as their non-playing coach for the year.
