= Alec Sloan =

Australian rules footballer

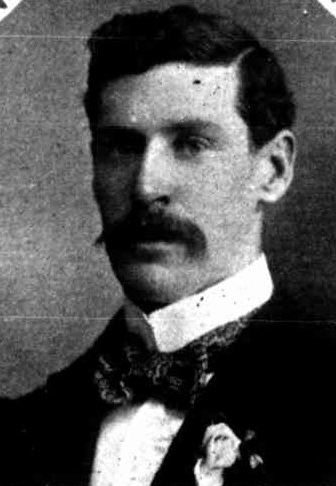
- Sloan in 1899

Personal information
- Full name: Alexander Barclay Sloan
- Born: 12 December 1870; Smeaton, Victoria
- Died: 29 June 1938 (aged 67); Ivanhoe, Victoria
- Original team: Brittania
- Position: Half back

Playing career^{1}
Years	Club	Games (Goals)
1892–1896	Fitzroy (VFA)	74 (8)
1897–1902	Fitzroy	66 (0)

Representative team honours^{2}
Years	Team	Games (Goals)
1900	Victoria	1 (0)
- ^{1} Playing statistics correct to the end of 1902.^{2} Representative statistics correct as of 1900.

Career highlights
- VFA premiership player: 1895; 2× VFL premiership player: 1898, 1899; Fitzroy captain: 1898–1900

Alexander Barclay Sloan (12 December 1870 – 29 June 1938) was an Australian rules footballer who played for the Fitzroy Football Club in the Victorian Football Association (VFA) and the Victorian Football League (VFL).

Sloan was a member of Fitzroy's inaugural premiership team in 1895 and captained the club from 1898 to 1900. He played most of his football at half back and was a premiership-winning captain in 1898 and 1899. This made him not only Fitzroy's first ever VFL premiership captain but also the league's first ever grand final winning captain, with the 1897 flag having been decided on a round robin system.

== See also ==
- The Footballers' Alphabet
