= Kevin Murray (Australian footballer) =

Australian rules footballer, born 1938

Personal information
- Full name: Kevin Joseph Murray
- Nickname: Bulldog
- Born: 18 June 1938 (age 88)
- Original team: Fitzroy Thirds
- Height: 178 cm (5 ft 10 in)
- Weight: 79 kg (174 lb)
- Positions: Half back flank, ruck-rover

Playing career^{1}
Years	Club	Games (Goals)
1955–1964, 1967–1974	Fitzroy	333 (51)
1965–1966	East Perth	44 (20)
1975–1976	Sandringham	12 (3)
Total		389 (74)

Representative team honours
Years	Team	Games (Goals)
	Victoria	24
	Western Australia	6

Coaching career^{3}
Years	Club	Games (W–L–D)
1963–1964	Fitzroy	34 (0–34–0)
1965–1966	East Perth	45 (26–19–0)
- ^{1} Playing statistics correct to the end of 1974.^{3} Coaching statistics correct as of 1966.

Career highlights
- Player: Brownlow Medal: 1969; Fitzroy Club Champion: 1956, 1958, 1960, 1961, 1962, 1963, 1964, 1968, 1969; Fitzroy captain: 1963–1964, 1967–1972; All-Australian team: 1958, 1966; AFL Team of the Century; Australian Football Hall of Fame – Legend status; East Perth Best and Fairest: 1965; East Perth captain; Representative: National Football Carnival Championship: 1958; Simpson Medal: 1965; Captain of Victoria; Captain of Western Australia

Kevin Joseph Murray MBE (born 18 June 1938), commonly nicknamed "Bulldog", is a former Australian rules footballer who played for the Fitzroy Football Club in the Victorian Football League in 333 games over 18 seasons.

== Family ==
The son of Daniel Thomas Murray (1912–1992) and Eileen May Murray (1913–1998), née Dowdle, Kevin Joseph Murray was born on 18 June 1938.

Murray's father, Dan, had also played for Fitzroy, including their 1944 VFL Grand Final victory.

== Football ==
He learned his junior football from Father John Brosnan (1919–2003) at St. Joseph's College, in Collingwood.

Although only 5 ft 10 in (178 cm) tall, he had a very long reach: In his own words, he felt his arm span was more like that of a player 6 ft 6 in (198 cm) tall.

=== Fitzroy (VFL) ===
Murray played for Fitzroy from 1955 to 1964 and from 1967 to 1974, winning nine best and fairest awards for the club. He represented and captained his home state of Victoria, and was playing coach of Fitzroy in 1963 and 1964. Although Fitzroy had not won a single game under his coaching, Murray would receive several offers from WANFL and country clubs following the close of the 1964 season.

=== East Perth (WANFL) ===
In October 1964, Murray signed with WANFL club East Perth, announcing to Fitzroy that he would move to Western Australia even if Fitzroy refused to clear him – although he feared a permanent falling out with his former club. Fitzroy refused two applications to clear Murray over the summer but relented by the end of March, 1965 as they feared that if they failed to clear him he would not return. Over two seasons he played 44 West Australian National Football League (WANFL) games. In 1965, he won the Simpson Medal for best player in the WA v VFA interstate match and also won East Perth's best and fairest award.

In 1966, he captained WA at the 1966 Hobart Carnival and led East Perth to the WANFL Grand Final which they lost to Perth, who were captain/coached by former East Perth player Mal Atwell. Atwell switched to Perth because he didn't agree with Murray's methods.

=== Return to Fitzroy ===
Despite his success in Perth, Murray was tipped to return to Fitzroy for 1967 soon after the 1966 home-and-away season was over. Like his move west, Murray's return to Victoria was affected by refusals of clearance: East Perth insisted Fitzroy pay $2,000 for him and consequently he was refused a clearance three times. His return to Fitzroy in 1967 was triumphant, winning the club's best and fairest award in his first two seasons back, and in 1969 Murray was awarded the Brownlow Medal.

=== Sandringham (VFA) ===
From 1975 until 1976, Murray served as captain-coach of the Sandringham Football Club in the Victorian Football Association.

== Career ==
Murray's 333 games for Fitzroy was a then-VFL record, though 208 of these games resulted in losses – which was record for a player in the VFL/AFL until it was broken by Carlton's Kade Simpson in 2020.

Murray also played 44 games for East Perth for a total of 377 career premiership games in elite Australian rules football, which remained a record until it was broken by Barry Cable in Round 20 of the 1979 WANFL season.

In his career, Murray played in a total of 226 games that resulted in losses, which remained an elite Australian rules football record until broken by Ralph Sewer in Round 16 of the 1990 SANFL season; Sewer retired at the end of that season having played in 229 games that resulted in losses.

=== Other matches ===
Murray also played 30 matches in interstate football - 24 for Victoria and six for Western Australia - and seventeen night series matches for Fitzroy (which are counted as senior by the WAFL but not the VFL/AFL). Among Murray's other honours, he was named an All-Australian player in 1958 for Victoria and 1966 for West Australia, the first player to achieve that distinction for two states. If these are considered, Murray played a total of 424 senior career games in elite Australian rules football.

The VFL/AFL lists Murray's total as 407 career senior games, excluding his pre-season/night series matches for Fitzroy.

Despite the differing viewpoints, Murray was the first player in elite Australian rules football history to play 400 senior career matches, a feat he achieved in either of Round 15 of 1974 (using the VFL/AFL's total) or Round 20 of 1973 (using his overall total).

Using either of the VFL/AFL's Victorian total of 357 or his overall Victorian total of 374, Murray's Victorian career senior games total was behind only John Nicholls at his retirement.

Murray's senior career games total remained an elite Australian rules football record until broken by Kevin Bartlett in either of the 1982 Grand Final (using the VFL/AFL's total) or Round 5 of 1983 (using his overall total); Bartlett retired at the end of the 1983 season with 427 senior career games (using the VFL/AFL's total) or 439 senior career games (using his overall total).

== Brisbane Lions ==
At the end of the 1996 season, Fitzroy merged with the Brisbane Bears to form the Brisbane Lions. Murray was a great supporter of the new entity; the Lions' club championship award, the Merrett–Murray Medal, is part-named in Murray's honour.

== Australian Football Hall of Fame ==
Murray has been inducted into the Australian Football Hall of Fame and was elevated to Legend status in 2010.

== See also ==
- Fitzroy's Team of the Century
- AFL/VFL Team of the Century
- 1963 Miracle Match
- Fitzroy FC honour roll – for coaches, captains, leading goalkickers and team position.
- List of Fitzroy Football Club coaches
- List of Fitzroy Football Club players
