= Owen Abrahams =

Australian rules footballer, born 1933

Personal information
- Full name: Owen Lindsay Abrahams
- Born: 25 July 1933
- Died: 31 January 2006 (aged 72)
- Original team: Commonwealth Bank team
- Debut: 29 May 1954 (Round 7), Fitzroy vs. Essendon, at Windy Hill

Playing career^{1}
Years	Club	Games (Goals)
1954–1962	Fitzroy	132 (232)
- ^{1} Playing statistics correct to the end of 1962.

Career highlights
- Fitzroy leading Goalkicker: 1957, 1961; Fitzroy Captain: 1962; Victorian State representative: 9 Games

Owen Lindsay Abrahams (25 July 1933 – 31 January 2006) was an Australian rules footballer who played for Fitzroy in the VFL.

Abrahams' football career did not start well after he was rejected by Fitzroy's thirds team, but he moved to the amateurs where he played with the Commonwealth Bank team, from which he was selected with the Fitzroy senior team.

He made a name for himself as a specialist half-forward and was named All-Australian in 1958, played for Victoria 9 times, and was captain of the Lions in 1962. Abrahams was later named as part of the Fitzroy Team of the Century.

Following his retirement Abrahams served as the Lions' treasurer. He died in January 2006 at the age of 72 following a serious illness.

Abrahams was inducted into the Brisbane Lions Hall of Fame in 2026.
