= Jack Cashman =

Australian rules footballer and coach

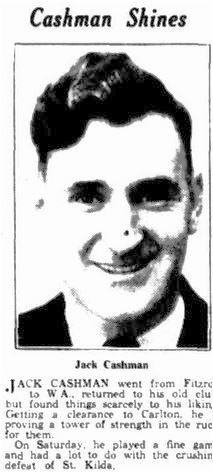
- Newsclipping of Cashman in June 1934

Personal information
- Full name: John Joseph William Cashman
- Born: 21 April 1906; Zeehan, Tasmania
- Died: 18 July 1982 (aged 76); Parkville, Victoria
- Original team: Fitzroy Juniors
- Height: 189 cm (6 ft 2 in)
- Weight: 88 kg (194 lb)
- Position: Forward/Ruckman

Playing career^{1}
Years	Club	Games (Goals)
1926–31, 1934	Fitzroy	76 (102)
1932–33, 1936	West Perth	31 (45)
1934–35	Carlton	17 (23)
1935, 1937	Yarraville (VFA)	16 (38)
1938–41	Cananore (TFL)	

Coaching career
Years	Club	Games (W–L–D)
1934	Fitzroy	2 (1–1–0)
- ^{1} Playing statistics correct to the end of 1937.

John Joseph William Cashman (21 April 1906 – 18 July 1982) was an Australian rules footballer who played for Fitzroy and Carlton in the Victorian Football League (VFL), West Perth in the West Australian Football League (WAFL) and Yarraville in the Victorian Football Association (VFA).

Cashman was used during his career mostly as a ruckman and forward. He was recruited locally to Fitzroy and kicked 25 goals for them in 1929.

In 1932 he went to Western Australia and took on the role of captain-coach of West Perth, steering them to their first WAFL premiership since 1905 in his first year in charge. He led West Perth to a third place the following season and was lured back to Fitzroy where he was appointed captain-coach.

After just two games as captain-coach of Fitzroy, Cashman resigned, citing that members of the club committee were against him. A four-time VFL interstate representative, he got a clearance to Carlton and finished the season there, kicking 19 goals up forward.

Although he started the 1935 season at Carlton, he ended up at Yarraville and was a centre half forward in their premiership that year. After a year back with West Perth in 1936, he continued his coaching career in 1937 when he was put in charge of Yarraville and in 1938 he became captain-coach of Cananore in Tasmania before retiring in 1941.
