= 1917 VFL grand final =

Grand final of the 1917 Victorian Football League season

1917 VFL Grand Final
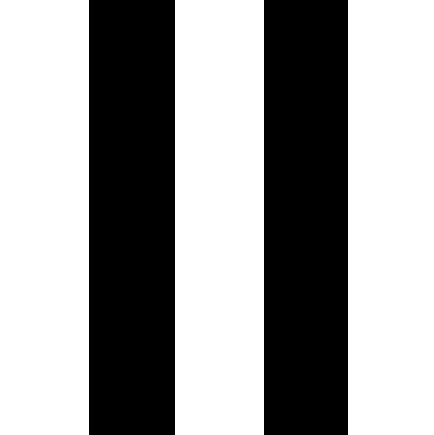

Collingwood	Fitzroy
9.20 (74)	5.9 (39)
	1	2	3	4
COLL	2.6 (18)	3.8 (26)	6.14 (50)	9.20 (74)
FIT	1.0 (6)	2.2 (14)	3.4 (22)	5.9 (39)
- Date: 22 September 1917
- Stadium: Melbourne Cricket Ground
- Attendance: 28,512

The 1917 VFL Grand Final was an Australian rules football game contested between the Collingwood Football Club and Fitzroy Football Club, held at the Melbourne Cricket Ground in Melbourne on 22 September 1917. It was the 20th annual Grand Final of the Victorian Football League, staged to determine the premiers for the 1917 VFL season. The match, attended by 28,512 spectators, was won by Collingwood by a margin of 35 points, marking that club's fourth premiership victory.

War had restricted the competition to just six clubs during the home and away season and Fitzroy, despite winning just six of their 15 games, qualified for the final by finishing fourth.

Fitzroy made it into the Grand Final by defeating minor premiers Collingwood by a goal a week earlier but Collingwood this time won comfortably, dominating from the opening quarter.

Alec Mutch of Collingwood was playing his 100th VFL game.

== Teams ==
Collingwood	Fitzroy

Collingwood
B:	Jock McHale	Harry Saunders	Alec Mutch
HB:	George Anderson	Charlie Brown	Jack Green
C:	Tom Drummond	Percy Wilson (c)	Charlie Pannam
HF:	Gus Dobrigh	Harry Curtis	Charlie Lee
F:	Con McCarthy	Dick Lee	Ernie Lumsden
Foll:	Les Hughes	Pen Reynolds	Charlie Laxton
Coach:	Jock McHale		

Fitzroy
B:	Bill Byrne	Fred Bamford	Bert Lenne
HB:	Chris Lethbridge	Jim Toohey	Bob King
C:	Roy Millen	George Holden (c)	Carl Keller
HF:	Percy Parratt	Thomas Heaney	Gordon Rattray
F:	Jimmy Freake	Len Wigraft	Tom Lowrie
Foll:	Fred Moore	Charlie Norris	Ted McDonald
Coach:	George Holden		

- Umpire – Norden

== Statistics ==
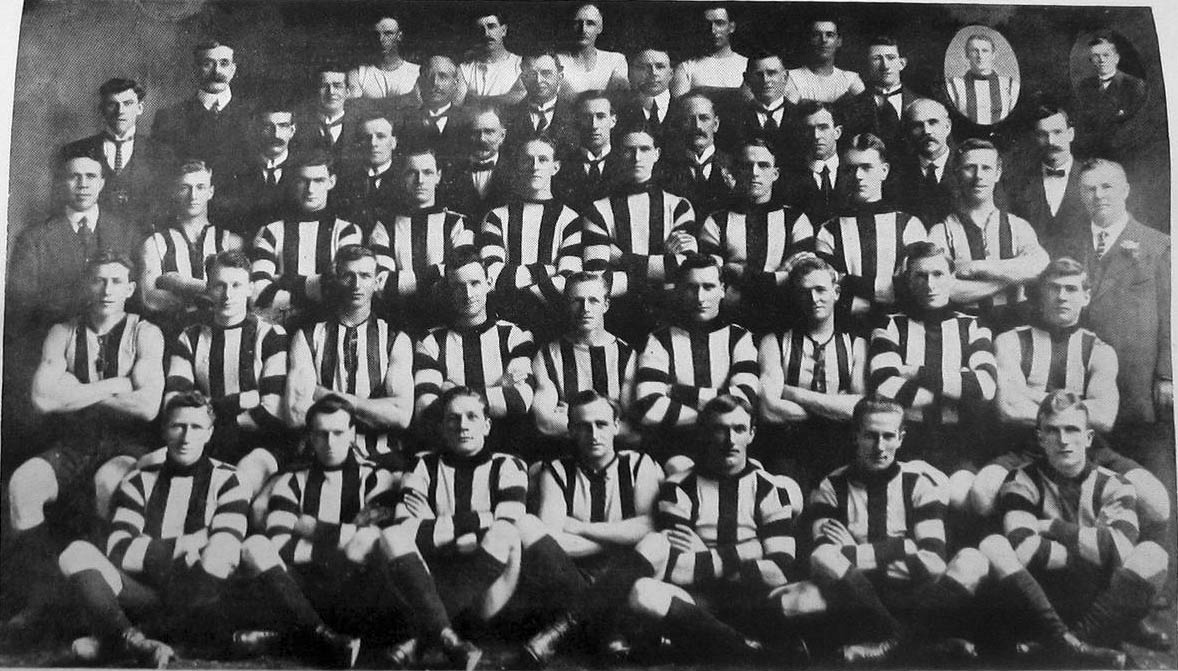
Collingwood FC, Premier team

=== Goalkickers ===
Collingwood:

- D.Lee 4
- Curtis 3
- Dobrigh 1
- Hughes 1

Fitzroy:

- Freake 1
- Norris 1
- Parratt 1
- Rattray 1
- Toohey 1

=== Attendance ===
- MCG crowd – 28,512

== See also ==
- 1917 VFL season
