= List of Fitzroy Football Club leading goalkickers =

The following is a list of Fitzroy Football Club leading goalkickers in each of their seasons in the Victorian Football Association and Australian Football League (formerly the Victorian Football League).

== Leading goalkickers by season ==
The following is a list of Fitzroy leading goalkickers in each season.

=== VFA era ===
Season	Player(s)	Goals
1884	E. Carew	5
1884	G. Heron	5
1885	Herbert Rapiport	12
1886	A. Newlands	16
1887	Jack Worrall	16
1888	James Hogg	12
1888	W. Schmidt	12
1889	Jack Worrall (2)	24
1890	Jim Grace	35
1891	Jim Grace (2)	49
1892	Jim Grace (3)	48
1893	Jim Grace (4)	48
1894	Jim Grace (5)	23
1895	Jim Grace (6)	24
1896	Jim Grace (7)	19

=== VFL/AFL era ===
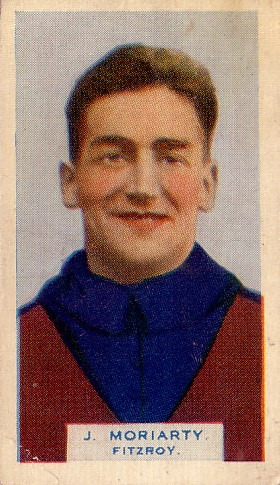
Jack Moriarty was leading goalkicker for Fitzroy more times than any other player in history

Season	Player(s)	Goals
1897	Chris Kiernan	11
1898	Chris Kiernan (2)	18
1899	Bill McSpeerin	18
1900	Chris Kiernan (3)	21
1901	Gerald Brosnan	33
1902	Percy Trotter	22
1903	Percy Trotter (2)	27
1904	Percy Trotter (3)	36
1905	Alf Wilkinson	30
1906	Percy Trotter (4)	28
1907	Jim Sharp	24
1908	Wally Johnson	27
1909	Billy Dick	26
1910	Bob Briggs	30
1911	Bruce Campbell	25
1912	Jimmy Freake	53
1913	Jimmy Freake (2)	56
1914	Jimmy Freake (3)	47
1915	Jimmy Freake (4)	66
1916	Tom Heaney	27
1917	Jimmy Freake (5)	37
1918	Jimmy Freake (6)	29
1919	Bob Merrick	42
1920	Bob Merrick (2)	53
1921	Bob Merrick (3)	32
1922	Bob Merrick (4)	47
1923	Jimmy Freake (7)	45
1924	Jack Moriarty	82
1925	Jack Moriarty (2)	63
1926	Jack Moriarty (3)	48
1927	Jack Moriarty (4)	83
1928	Jack Moriarty (5)	68
1929	Jack Moriarty (6)	58
1930	Charlie Chapman	46
1931	Jack Moriarty (7)	53
1932	Jack Moriarty (8)	81
1933	Jack Moriarty (9)	70
1934	Len Pye	39
1935	Denis Ryan	46
1936	Haydn Bunton Sr.	33
1937	Haydn Bunton Sr. (2)	37
1938	Fred Hughson	62
1939	Clen Denning	37
1940	Claude Curtin	56
1941	Claude Curtin (2)	65
1942	Claude Curtin (3)	61
1943	Jack Grant	42
1944	Allan Ruthven	46
1945	Allan Ruthven (2)	42
1946	Claude Curtin (4)	56
1947	Eddie Hart	64
1948	Eddie Hart (2)	61
1949	Eddie Hart (3)	53
1950	Eddie Hart (4)	50
1951	Eddie Hart (5)	65
1952	Tony Ongarello	50
1953	Joe Hickey	40
1954	Allan Ruthven (3)	31
1955	Norm Johnstone	32
1956	Tony Ongarello (2)	33
1957	Owen Abrahams	31
1958	Tony Ongarello (3)	53
1959	Kevin Wright	43
1960	Kevin Wright (2)	36
1961	Owen Abrahams (2)	32
1962	Wally Clark	21
1963	Gary Lazarus	35
1964	Ralph Rogerson	27
1965	Gary Lazarus (2)	32
1966	Gary Lazarus (3)	39
1967	Gary Lazarus (4)	35
1968	Doug Searl	31
1969	Doug Searl (2)	68
1970	Alex Ruscuklic	49
1971	John Murphy	47
1972	Garry Wilson	37
1973	Garry Wilson (2)	43
1974	David Wall	35
1975	Renato Serafini	34
1976	John Murphy	35
1977	Bob Beecroft	59
1978	Bob Beecroft (2)	65
1979	Bob Beecroft (3)	87
1980	Bob Beecroft (4)	63
1981	Bernie Quinlan	73
1982	Bernie Quinlan (2)	53
1983	Bernie Quinlan (3)	116
1984	Bernie Quinlan (4)	105
1985	Bernie Quinlan (5)	84
1986	Richard Osborne	62
1987	Richard Osborne (2)	62
1988	Richard Osborne (3)	60
1989	Richard Osborne (4)	68
1990	Paul Roos	49
1991	Darren Wheildon	29
1992	Richard Osborne (5)	58
1993	Alastair Lynch	68
1994	Darren Wheildon (2)	26
1995	Chris Johnson	25
1996	Anthony Mellington	22
