= 1916 VFL grand final =

Grand final of the 1916 Victorian Football League season

1916 VFL Grand Final

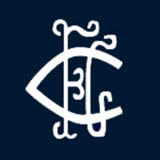
Fitzroy	Carlton
12.13 (85)	8.8 (56)
	1	2	3	4
FIT	4.6 (30)	8.8 (56)	10.11 (71)	12.13 (85)
CAR	2.0 (12)	4.2 (26)	6.8 (44)	8.8 (56)
- Date: 2 September 1916
- Stadium: Melbourne Cricket Ground
- Attendance: 21,130

The 1916 VFL Grand Final was an Australian rules football game contested between the Carlton Football Club and Fitzroy Football Club, held at the Melbourne Cricket Ground in Melbourne on 2 September 1916. It was the 19th annual Grand Final of the Victorian Football League, staged to determine the premiers for the 1916 VFL season. The match, attended by 21,130 spectators, was won by Fitzroy by a margin of 29 points, marking that club's sixth premiership victory.

== Background ==
The 1916 season was played by only 4 teams, Carlton, Collingwood, Richmond and Fitzroy, owing to the absence of many of the players who were fighting in World War I.

Carlton ended the home and away season with 10 wins from 12 games and were minor premiers. Fitzroy won only 2 games and a draw to finish bottom, however with only 4 teams available to fill the 4 finals spots they won through to the Grand Final thanks to victories over Collingwood by 6 points in the Semi Final and Carlton by 23 in the Final. Carlton defeated Richmond by 3 in the other Semi Final.

During the season the teams played 4 times, with Fitzroy winning the first match by 4 points, and Carlton winning the other three by 33, 29 and 21.

The four finals games were the only games that year played at the MCG.

== Teams ==
Fitzroy	Carlton

Fitzroy
B:	Bob King	Bert Lenne	Fred Bamford
HB:	Ted McDonald	Wally Johnson (c)	Harold McLennan
C:	Teddy Buist	George Holden	Roy Millen
HF:	Bert O'Dee	Thomas Heaney	Percy Parratt
F:	Tom Lowrie	Horrie Jenkin	Teddy Purcell
Foll:	Charlie Norris	Fred Moore	George Shaw
Coach:	George Holden		

Carlton
B:	Andy McDonald	Steve Leehane	Harry Greaves
HB:	Paddy O'Brien	Billy Dick (c)	Billy Robinson
C:	Ted Brown	Jimmy Morris	Dan Keily
HF:	Charlie Fisher	Joe Shortill	Percy Daykin
F:	George Calwell	Vin Gardiner	Alex Lang
Foll:	Harry Haughton	Charlie Hammond	Viv Valentine
Coach:	Norm Clark		

- Umpire – Norden

== Statistics ==
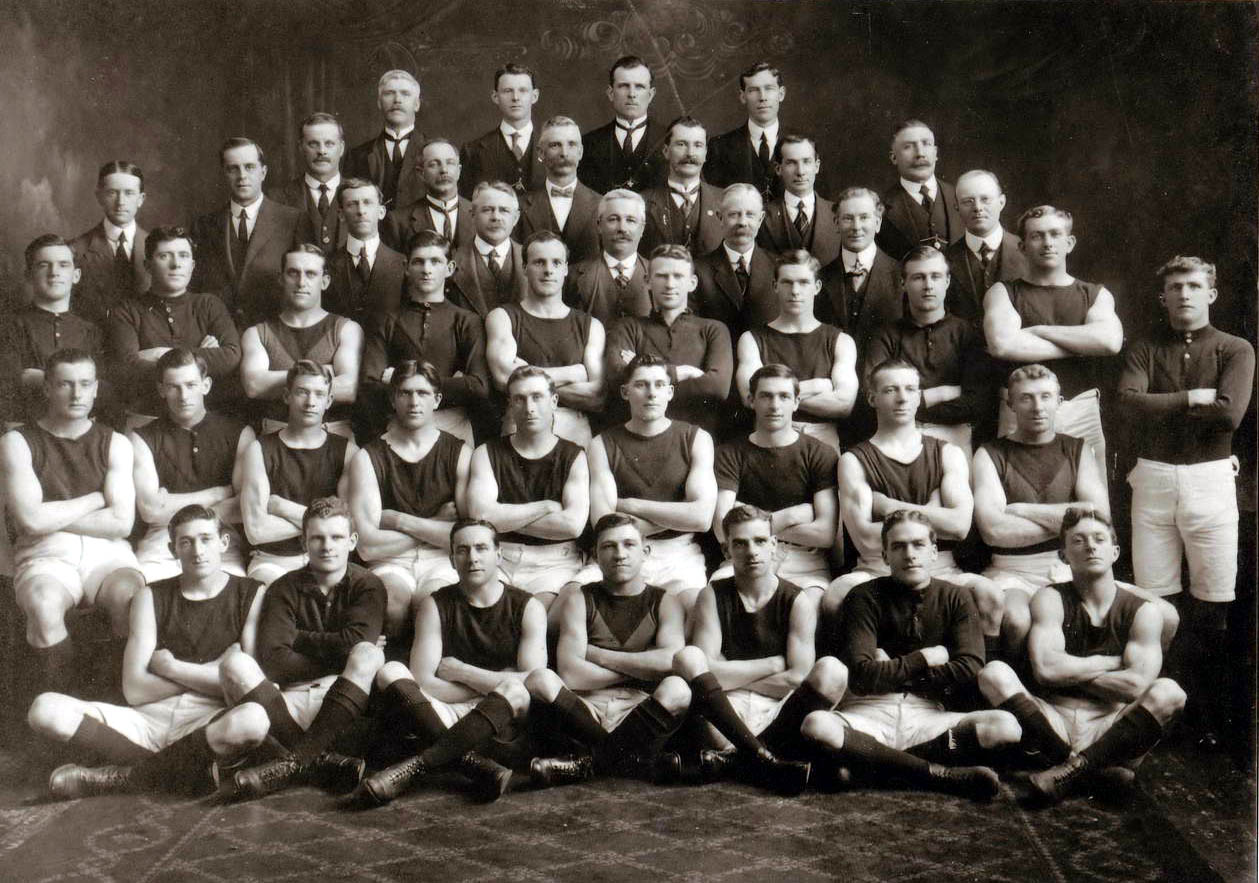
Fitzroy FC, Premiers

=== Goalkickers ===
Fitzroy:

- T Heaney 3
- P Parratt 3
- B O'Dee 2
- G Holden 1
- H Jenkin 1
- T Lowrie 1
- F Moore 1

Carlton:

- B Dick 3
- C Fisher 2
- V Gardiner 1
- H Haughton 1
- A Lang 1

== See also ==
- 1916 VFL season
