= Des Baird =

Australian rules footballer

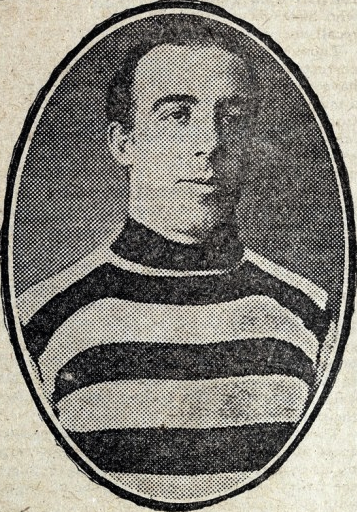

Personal information
- Full name: Alexander Gordon Desmond Baird
- Born: 26 June 1888; Sunbury, Victoria
- Died: 27 March 1947 (aged 58); Clifton Hill, Victoria
- Original team: Sunbury
- Height: 182 cm (6 ft 0 in)
- Weight: 74 kg (163 lb)

Playing career^{1}
Years	Club	Games (Goals)
1908–1909	South Melbourne	6 (0)
1912–1914	St Kilda	31 (7)
Total		37 (7)
- ^{1} Playing statistics correct to the end of 1914.

Career highlights
- 1909 Championship of Australia (winning team); 1913 VFL Grand Final (losing team)

Alexander Gordon Desmond Baird (26 June 1888 – 27 March 1947) was an Australian rules footballer who played with South Melbourne and St Kilda in the Victorian Football League (VFL). He played a prominent part in the 1913 VFL Grand Final; his decision to handball in the final minutes, instead of shoot at goal, is often blamed as having cost St Kilda the premiership.

== South Melbourne ==
Baird, a follower from Sunbury, first played for South Melbourne in the 1908 VFL season. He played once that year, then five games in 1909, a premiership season for South Melbourne. Not selected in the finals, Baird was however a member of the South Melbourne side which a week later defeated West Adelaide to claim the Championship of Australia.

== St Kilda ==
In 1912 he was cleared to St Kilda and played 10 games in his first season at the club. He played 16 games in 1913, including the 1913 VFL Grand Final.

=== 1913 VFL Grand Final ===
St Kilda had qualified for its first grand final and came up against Fitzroy, the minor premiers. Baird started as one of St Kilda's followers, along with George Morrissey and Ernie Sellars. In the last quarter, which St Kilda began 25 points behind, Baird kicked the second of two early goals for St Kilda. Two goals to Morrissey reduced the margin to two points with only a few minutes remaining.

Accounts of what happened next vary, but Baird is known to have taken a mark within range of goal, giving him an opportunity to put St Kilda in front, but instead the ball ended up with Morrissey who could only kick a behind. The Age wrote that Baird had "muddled things up" and it proved to be a turning point, as Fitzroy were able to kick two late goals to secure a 13-point win.

Baird later recalled:

As I was expecting the bell to go any tick of the clock, I took more than ordinary time. This momentary delay was responsible for my being surrounded by practically the whole of the Fitzroy backs and incidentally the whole of our forwards surged up to the mark as a sort of protection – momentarily everyone sort of clustered round me. As Morrissey saw an open road to goal he called for the hand-pass. He received the pass OK – it was not intercepted – and instead of running straight into the goal base, as there was no player between him and the goal, he just turned and kicked hurriedly and registered a behind.

This account was questioned by teammate Bob Bowden. He disputed that Morrissey had called for the ball and claimed that the handball had actually been aimed at him. Bowden recalled that Baird, after marking the ball clear from any opponent, attempted to handball to him but it came out the side of his hand and instead went towards the boundary line. It was there that Morrissey gathered the ball and shot for goal, from what Bowden called a "most difficult angle".

== New South Wales ==
=== Paddington ===
Baird played five games early in the 1914 VFL season, then was cleared to Sydney, where he signed with Paddington in the New South Wales Football League.

His participation in the competition was put in doubt when the Sydney Football Club launched a protest, following a 70-all draw which he had taken part in. The club claimed that he had not lived in Paddington's district for the one-month requirement and was ineligible to play. In Baird's case, the one-month qualification was not believed to have been applicable due to a rule in which players who had come from other states could play on arrival. The issue was that his residence, although in Paddington and only 10 minutes walk from the club's ground, happened to be in the East Sydney district and he was living there up until the day before the match. Upon learning of the mistake, Baird had to move to Waverley in order to meet the residential qualifications, but this meant the one-month requirement was now applied. Citing disgust at how things had unfolded and anticipating further protests, Baird resigned from Paddington, but was persuaded out of retirement and once he was ruled eligible to play resumed his career. It was decided that the match between Sydney and Paddington would be replayed later in the season. Sydney however ended up forfeiting the match, as a win would not have affected their position on the ladder.

He was vice-captain of the New South Wales team at the 1914 Sydney Carnival in August.

In the third quarter of Paddington's 1914 semi-final loss to South Sydney, Baird was singled out for rough treatment by his opponents. The fighting became serious enough that the police were called to the ground and Baird had to take refuge in the pavilion.

Baird was unavailable for much of the 1915 season—an ankle injury kept him on the sidelines and he then went down to Melbourne on holidays. With Paddington making the premiership decider, Baird travelled up to Sydney on the morning on the match. Paddington defeated Newtown by 18-points to claim its first premiership.

=== North Sydney ===
In 1921, Baird was elected captain of North Sydney, which were returning to the competition after they had gone into recess during the war. The club were able to win the premiership in its first season back, with Baird featuring in the premiership team, along with four other former VFL players, Les Charge, Herb Friend, Bryan Rush and Gerald Ryan.

== Later life ==
Baird was involved in football administration at the time of his death in 1947; he had been assistant secretary of St Kilda the previous season.
