= 1913 VFL grand final =

Grand final of the 1913 Victorian Football League season

1913 VFL Grand Final

Fitzroy	St Kilda
7.14 (56)	5.13 (43)
	1	2	3	4
FIT	3.6 (24)	4.8 (32)	5.11 (41)	7.14 (56)
STK	0.1 (1)	0.5 (5)	1.10 (16)	5.13 (43)
- Date: 27 September 1913
- Stadium: Melbourne Cricket Ground
- Attendance: 59,556
- Umpires: Jack Elder

The 1913 VFL Grand Final was an Australian rules football game contested between the Fitzroy Football Club and St Kilda Football Club, held at the Melbourne Cricket Ground in Melbourne on 27 September 1913. It was the 16th annual grand final of the Victorian Football League, staged to determine the premiers for the 1913 VFL season. The match, attended by 59,556 spectators, was won by Fitzroy by a margin of 13 points, marking that club's fifth premiership victory.

It was St Kilda's first ever grand final appearance and they struggled early, not kicking a goal until the third quarter. A last quarter burst from St Kilda had them within two points when George Morrissey goaled. A mark to Des Baird looked like giving the Saints the lead but he handpassed it to Morrissey who was covered by his opponent and he could only kick a behind. Two late goals to Fitzroy sealed the game.

== Teams ==
Fitzroy	St Kilda

Fitzroy
B:	Chris Lethbridge	Bert Lenne	Artie Harrison
HB:	Charlie Wells	Wally Johnson	Jack Cooper
C:	Teddy Buist	Harold McLennan	George Holden
HF:	Percy Parratt	Thomas Heaney	Jim Toohey
F:	Jim Martin	Jimmy Freake	George Shaw
Foll:	Bill Walker (c)	Charlie Norris	Percy Heron
Coach:	Percy Parratt		

St Kilda
B:	Harrie Hattam	Harry Lever (c)	Dick L. Harris
HB:	Wels Eicke	Gordon Dangerfield	Reg Ellis
C:	Ted Collins	Billy Schmidt	Bob Bowden
HF:	Roy Cazaly	Phil Lynch	Percy Jory
F:	Des Baird	Ernie Sellars	George Morrissey
Foll:	Vic Cumberland	Bill Woodcock	Algy Millhouse
Coach:	George Sparrow		

- Umpire – Jack Elder

== Statistics ==
=== Goalkickers ===
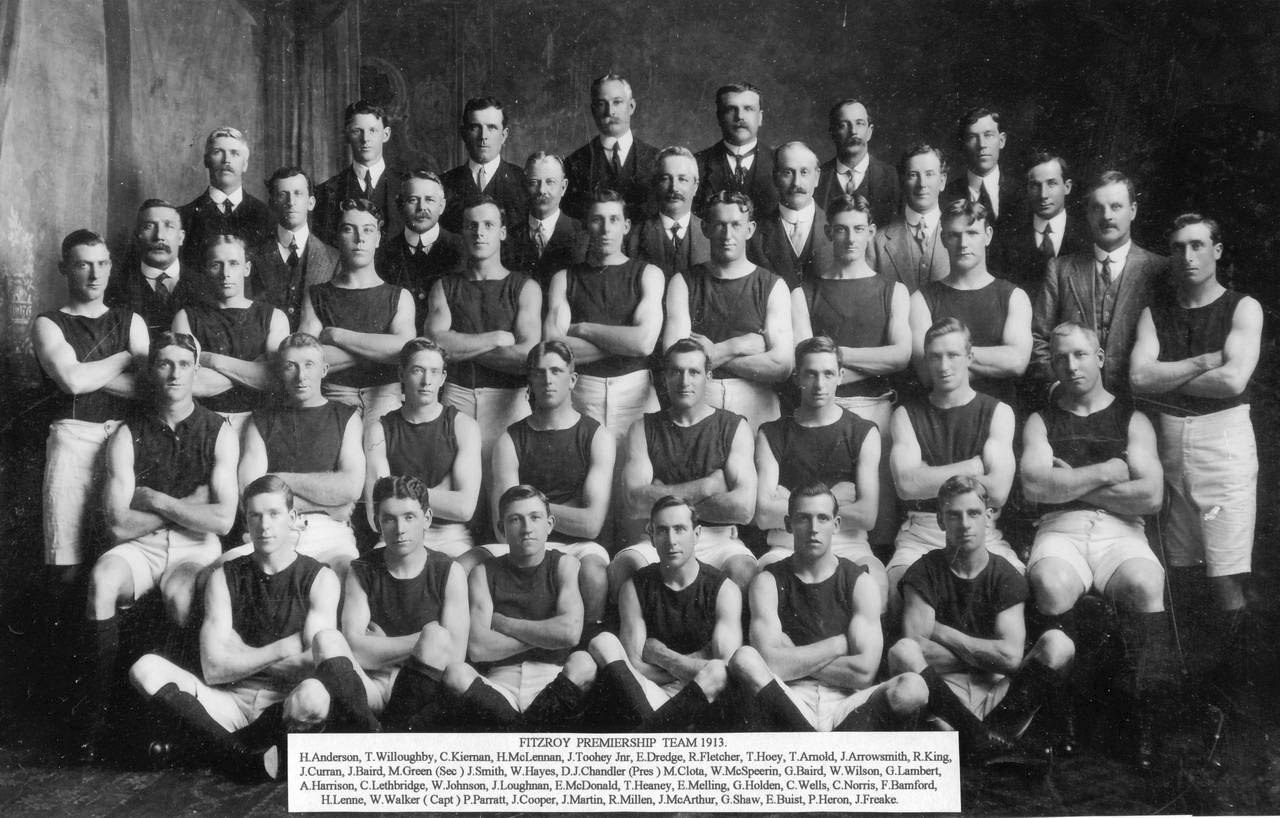
Fitzroy, Premier team

Fitzroy:

- Shaw 2
- Freake 1
- Heaney 1
- Martin 1
- Norris 1
- Parratt 1

St Kilda:

- Morrissey 2
- Baird 1
- Millhouse 1
- Sellars 1

=== Attendance ===
- MCG crowd – 59,556

== See also ==
- 1913 VFL season
