= Teddy Purcell (footballer) =

Australian rules footballer

Personal information
- Full name: Edward John Purcell
- Born: 15 June 1896; Yarragon, Victoria
- Died: 10 May 1933 (aged 36); Kew, Victoria

Playing career^{1}
Years	Club	Games (Goals)
1916–1917	Fitzroy	18 (2)
- ^{1} Playing statistics correct to the end of 1917.

Career highlights
- Fitzroy premiership player 1916

Edward John Purcell (15 June 1896 – 10 May 1933) was an Australian rules football player at the Fitzroy Football Club in the Victorian Football League (VFL). He became a premiership player at Fitroy, playing in the 1916 VFL Grand Final, under the captaincy of Wally Johnson, with George Holden as coach. Purcell made his debut against Carlton in Round 1 of the 1916 VFL season, at Princes Park.
