= Bert O'Dee =

Australian rules footballer

Personal information
- Full name: Albert Hector James O'Dee
- Born: 17 July 1896; Fitzroy, Victoria
- Died: 5 June 1982 (aged 85); Macleod, Victoria
- Original team: Police

Playing career^{1}
Years	Club	Games (Goals)
1915–1921	Fitzroy	31 (5)
- ^{1} Playing statistics correct to the end of 1921.

Career highlights
- Fitzroy premiership player 1916

Albert Hector James O'Dee (17 July 1896 – 5 June 1982) was an Australian rules football player at the Fitzroy Football Club in the Victorian Football League (VFL).

== Football ==
He became a premiership player at Fitzroy, playing in the 1916 VFL Grand Final, under the captaincy of Wally Johnson, with George Holden as coach. O'Dee made his debut for Fitzroy against Richmond in Round 15 of the 1915 VFL season, at the Brunswick Street Oval.
