= Fred Moore (Australian footballer) =

Australian rules footballer

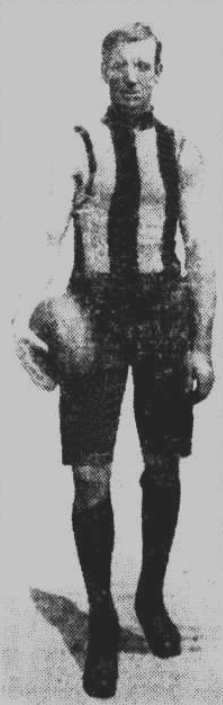
- Fred Moore in Brunswick uniform, 1922.

Personal information
- Full name: Frederick John Moore
- Born: 25 June 1890; Williamstown, Victoria
- Died: 7 October 1971 (aged 81); Frankston, Victoria
- Original team: Northcote

Playing career^{1}
| Years | Club | Games (Goals) |
| 1913–1914 | Northcote (VFA) | 30 (12) |
| 1916–1919 | Fitzroy | 48 (29) |
| 1920–1923 | Brunswick (VFA) | 70 (42) |
- ^{1} Playing statistics correct to the end of 1919.

Career highlights
- Fitzroy premiership player 1916

Frederick John Moore (25 June 1890 – 7 October 1971) was an Australian rules football player at the Fitzroy Football Club in the Victorian Football League (VFL). He became a premiership player at Fitroy, playing in the 1916 VFL Grand Final, under the captaincy of Wally Johnson, with George Holden as coach. Moore made his debut against Richmond in Round 8 of the 1916 VFL season, at the Punt Road Oval.

In 1920 Moore began playing for Brunswick Football Club in the VFA and in 1922 he played a then record fifty consecutive games for the club.
