= Harry Greaves =

Harry Greaves may refer to:

- Harry Greaves (footballer) (1895–1974), Australian rules footballer
- Harry B. Greaves (1867–1944), American lawyer and politician Mississippi
