= Fred Bamford (footballer) =

Australian rules footballer

Personal information
- Full name: Frederick George Bamford
- Born: 10 April 1887; Bendigo, Victoria
- Died: 30 March 1955 (aged 67); Cheltenham, Victoria
- Original team: South Bendigo (BFL)

Playing career^{1}
Years	Club	Games (Goals)
1911–1919	Fitzroy	119 (1)
- ^{1} Playing statistics correct to the end of 1919.

Career highlights
- VFL premiership player: 1916

Frederick George Bamford (10 April 1887 – 30 March 1955) was an Australian rules football player at the Fitzroy Football Club in the Victorian Football League (VFL). He became a premiership player at Fitzroy, playing in the 1916 VFL Grand Final, under the captaincy of Wally Johnson, with George Holden as coach. Bamford made his debut against Geelong in Round 5 of the 1911 VFL season, at the Brunswick Street Oval.
