= Tom Lowrie =

Australian rules footballer

Personal information
- Full name: Thomas Lowrie
- Born: 1 December 1896; South Melbourne, Victoria
- Died: 9 July 1944 (aged 47); South Melbourne, Victoria
- Original team: Port Melbourne Juniors

Playing career^{1}
Years	Club	Games (Goals)
1915–1919	Fitzroy	48 (48)
1920–1922	St Kilda	20 (24)
Total		68 (72)
- ^{1} Playing statistics correct to the end of 1922.

Career highlights
- Fitzroy premiership player 1916

Thomas Lowrie (1 December 1896 – 9 July 1944) was an Australian rules football player at the Fitzroy Football Club and the St Kilda Football Club in the Victorian Football League (VFL). He became a premiership player at Fitroy, playing in the 1916 VFL Grand Final, under the captaincy of Wally Johnson, with George Holden as coach. Lowrie made his debut for Fitzroy against Essendon in Round 12 of the 1915 VFL season, at the Brunswick Street Oval.
