= Goodger =

Goodger is a surname. Notable people with the surname include:

- Ben Goodger, British-New Zealand software engineer
- Eddie Goodger (born 1929), Australian rules footballer
- Lauren Goodger (born 1986), English television personality

== See also ==
- Goodger, Queensland, a locality in the South Burnett Region, Queensland, Australia
