= Les Charge =

Australian rules footballer

Personal information
- Full name: Leslie Barkly Charge
- Born: 27 July 1891; Richmond, Victoria
- Died: 30 March 1957 (aged 65); Bondi, New South Wales
- Original team: Leopold
- Height: 185 cm (6 ft 1 in)
- Weight: 83 kg (183 lb)

Playing career^{1}
Years	Club	Games (Goals)
1910–1915	South Melbourne	65 (50)
- ^{1} Playing statistics correct to the end of 1915.

Leslie Barkly Charge (27 July 1891 – 30 March 1957) was an Australian rules footballer who played with South Melbourne in the Victorian Football League (VFL).

== Family ==
The son of Henry Barkly Charge (1866–1912), and Alice Mary Ann Charge (1864–1920), née Kendall, Leslie Barkly Charge was born at Richmond, Victoria on 27 July 1891.

He married Nellie May Bethune (1889–1976), at Echuca, Victoria on 26 September 1917. They had three daughters.

== Football ==
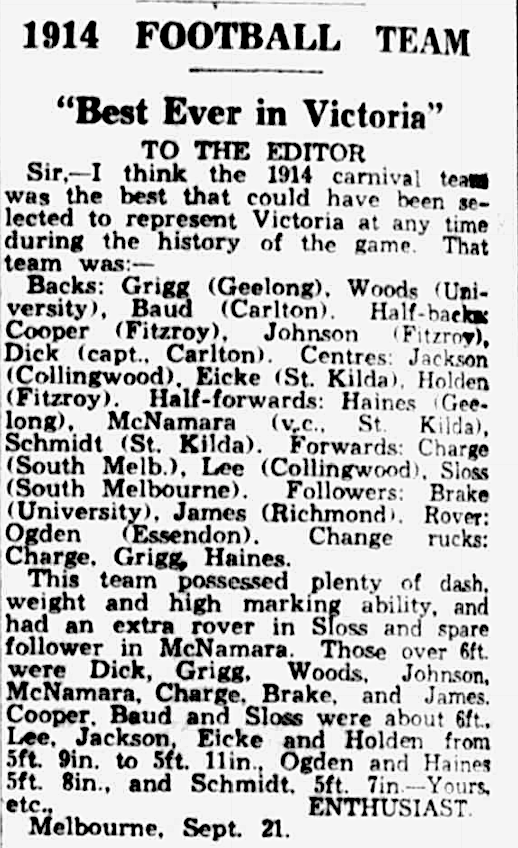
Enthusiast's Letter to the Editor The Herald, 21 Sept. 1934.

=== South Melbourne ===
A powerful tap-ruckman, Charge was recruited from the Leopold Football Club in the Metropolitan Junior Football Association (MJFA) in 1910, at the suggestion of the former South Melbourne champion, Harry Lampe.

Charge took a while to establish a place in the senior team; however, he eventually became a regular fixture, playing 56 of his 65 senior matches from 1912 to 1914. He was first ruck in South Melbourne's 1912 VFL Grand Final loss to Essendon and its 1914 VFL Grand Final loss to Carlton.

"By a popular vote taken by the proprietors of the football journal "The Follower", Les Charge, of South Melbourne, has been acclaimed the best all-round footballer in the League competition. Charge secured over 20,000 votes, and will be presented with a gold medal valued at £2 2/." — The (Emerald Hill) Record, 27 March 1915.

=== North Shore (NSWAFA) ===
Along with Des Baird (ex-South Melbourne, ex-St Kilda), Tom Fitzmaurice (ex-Essendon), Billy Friend (ex-Wesley College), Bryan Rush (ex-Collingwood), Gerald Ryan (ex-South Melbourne), and Paddy Shea (ex-Essendon), he played for the North Shore Australian Football Club the NSW Australian Football Association. He played for three seasons (1921 to 1923), and was a member of North Shore's 1921 premiership side. On 9 July 1921, at the Erskineville Oval, he also played for a combined Sydney team against a combined Newcastle Football League team.

== Death ==
He died in New South Wales on 30 March 1957.

== See also ==
- 1914 Sydney Carnival
