= Hugh Heron =

Australian rules footballer

Personal information
- Full name: Hugh Heron
- Born: 22 May 1890; Clifton Hill, Victoria
- Died: 6 December 1947 (aged 57); Preston, Victoria
- Original team: Fitzroy Juniors

Playing career^{1}
Years	Club	Games (Goals)
1912	Fitzroy	10 (1)
1913	Essendon	2 (0)
Total		12 (1)
- ^{1} Playing statistics correct to the end of 1913.

Hugh Heron (22 May 1890 – 6 December 1947) was an Australian rules footballer who played with Fitzroy and Essendon in the Victorian Football League (VFL).

Heron made his league debut for Fitzroy in the same match as his brother Percy, who was also recruited from the Fitzroy Juniors. After just one season, Heron switched clubs and joined Essendon but could only add a further two VFL appearances. He then turned to boundary umpiring and officiated in 120 matches from 1914 to 1926, one of them the 1923 Grand Final, where the field umpire was another former VFL player in Alec Mutch.

He died in a car accident on 6 December 1947.
