= Richard Osborne =

Australian rules footballer (born 1964)

Personal information
- Born: 16 June 1964 (age 62)
- Original team: Bulleen-Templestowe
- Height: 182 cm (6 ft 0 in)
- Weight: 86 kg (190 lb)
- Position: Forward

Playing career^{1}
Years	Club	Games (Goals)
1982–1992	Fitzroy	187 (411)
1993	Sydney	16 (39)
1994–1996	Footscray	51 (98)
1997–1998	Collingwood	29 (26)
Total		283 (574)

Representative team honours
Years	Team	Games (Goals)
- Victoria
- ^{1} Playing statistics correct to the end of 1998.

Career highlights
- Fitzroy 2nd Best & Fairest: 1984; Fitzroy Leading Goalkicker: 1986, 1987, 1988, 1989, 1992; Fitzroy Captain: 1991; Footscray Leading Goalkicker: 1995

Richard Osborne (born 16 June 1964) is a retired Australian rules footballer who enjoyed a lengthy career in the VFL/AFL. He played a total of 283 games in seventeen seasons, and played with four clubs, as well as representing Victoria 7 times in interstate competition.

Originally from Bulleen/Templestowe, he arrived at Fitzroy and made his senior debut in 1982 as a 17-year-old. Beginning in the forward line as an understudy to Bernie Quinlan, he would go on to become Fitzroy’s leading goalkicker five times, including four consecutive seasons kicking sixty goals between 1986 and 1989. He was made captain in 1991 for one season.

At the end of the 1992 season, after 187 games and 411 goals with the Lions, Osborne indicated to Fitzroy that he wanted to leave, with a move to Essendon the most likely result. Fitzroy delisted him, however, and in the pre-season draft he went on to become the No.1 pick, and began a short-lived 16-game career at Sydney. He suffered a severe head injury in the Round 9, being taken off the ground in an ambulance and requiring resuscitation on the way to hospital, but surprisingly returned to the field just three weeks later. In Round 13, Osborne kicked ten goals in the club's only win for the entire year, against Melbourne. After just one season at the Swans, he moved to Footscray in 1994.

In March 1994, during the pre-season, the Western Bulldogs released Osborne to let him participate in an NFL trial in the United States; however, the trial was unsuccessful and he returned to Australia. Osborne would play 51 games for the Bulldogs, and topped the club’s goalkicking in 1995.

At the end of 1996, Osborne changed clubs yet again, this time to Collingwood, where he played in 1997 and 1998. He managed 29 games in the two seasons at his final club, playing in a different role, half-back, whereas for most of his career he had predominantly been a forward.

In 1999, he was a boundary rider for the Seven Network during the finals series, and continued that role until Seven lost the rights to AFL coverage in 2001. In 1998, Osborne released his autobiography, Ossie Rules, co-written with Michael Hyde.

On 6 November 2009, it was announced he would coach the Monash Gryphons in Division 4 of the Victorian Amateur Football Association (VAFA) in 2010. He coached the side to a near-perfect 15–1 season, the club's first-ever premiership and promotion to Division 3.
