= Ernie Sellars =

Australian rules footballer

Personal information
- Full name: Harold Ernest Sellars
- Born: 20 June 1890; St Kilda, Victoria
- Died: 8 November 1955 (aged 65); Perth, Western Australia
- Original team: Grosvenor
- Height: 170 cm (5 ft 7 in)
- Weight: 66 kg (146 lb)
- Position: Full-forward

Playing career^{1}
Years	Club	Games (Goals)
1911–13	St Kilda	47 (119)
- ^{1} Playing statistics correct to the end of 1913.

Career highlights
- St Kilda leading goal-kicker 1911-1913

Harold Ernest Sellars (20 June 1890 – 8 November 1955) was an Australian rules footballer who played with St Kilda in the Victorian Football League (VFL).

Sellars kicked seven goals from full-forward on his debut for St Kilda, against University at Junction Oval to set a league record. The tally wasn't bettered by any debutante in the VFL until Footscray's Bill Wood kicked nine goals in 1944. He finished the year with 22 goals, which was enough to top St Kilda's goal-kicking, and he was again their leading goal-kicker the following season after kicking 44 goals. His final season at St Kilda, in 1913, was his finest and his 53 goals helped his club make their first ever Grand Final. Perhaps his best performance came in the Semi Final against South Melbourne when he kicked six goals. Only Jimmy Freake of Fitzroy kicked more goals in the league that season.

Sellars joined Western Australian Football League (WAFL) club East Perth in 1914 and the same year was chosen to represent Western Australia at the Sydney Carnival. He topped East Perth's goal-kicking in his first two seasons and finished with 68 WAFL goals from his 36 games.
