= Barrie Trotter =

Australian rules footballer

Personal information
- Full name: Barrie Trotter
- Born: 16 February 1960 (age 66)
- Original team: Tooronga-Malvern
- Height: 183 cm (6 ft 0 in)
- Weight: 83 kg (183 lb)

Playing career^{1}
| Years | Club | Games (Goals) |
| 1979 | Richmond | 2 (0) |
- ^{1} Playing statistics correct to the end of 1979.

Barrie Trotter (born 16 February 1960) is a former Australian rules footballer who played for the Richmond Football Club in the Victorian Football League (VFL).

His great uncle Percy Trotter played for Fitzroy in the early twentieth century.
