= Don Hart =

Australian rules footballer (1930–2018)

Personal information
- Full name: Donald Clement Hart
- Born: 29 September 1930
- Died: 8 February 2018 (aged 87)
- Original team: Westgarth Socials
- Height: 180 cm (5 ft 11 in)
- Weight: 77 kg (170 lb)

Playing career^{1}
Years	Club	Games (Goals)
1950–51, 1953	Fitzroy	37 (43)
1954	Richmond	5 (2)
1956-1958	Brighton (VFA)	53 142
1958-1962	Mornington	96 462
Total		191 (649)
- ^{1} Playing statistics correct to the end of 1962.

Donald Clement Hart (29 September 1930 – 8 February 2018) was an Australian rules footballer who played with Fitzroy, and Richmond, in the Victorian Football League (VFL), and with Brighton Football Club in the Victorian Football Association (VFA).

== Family ==
The son of Frederick Arthur Hart (1889–1948), and Elizabeth Hart (1889–1966), née King, Donald Clement Hart was born on 29 September 1930.

He married Phyllis Jean Hopewell on 9 October 1954.

Two of his three brothers, Arthur Robert Hart (1917 –1981) and Edward Ronald "Eddie" Hart (1922–1995) also played for Fitzroy, as had his uncle Robert "Bob" King (1894–1979).

== Football ==
A strong mark with a long left-foot kick, Hart played at full-forward and at centre half-forward.

=== Fitzroy (VFL) ===
Hart played for Fitzroy over three seasons (1950, 1951, 1953); he played in 37 First XVIII games, scoring 44 goals, and in 20 Second XVII games (scoring 31 goals in 1953 alone).

He was unable to play for the 1952 season due to a knee injury that required a cartilage operation.

=== Richmond (VFL) ===
Hart transferred to Richmond at the start of the 1954 season, playing in 5 First XVIII games, scoring 2 goals, and in 16 Second XVIII games, scoring 48 goals.

He played at centre half-forward, kicking one goal, in the Richmond Second XVIII team that beat Melbourne 10.20 (80) to 4.9 (33) in the 1954 Grand Final; and, with a season tally of 48 goals, he was the leading goal-kicker in the VFL Seconds competition that year.

=== VFL Seconds ===
Playing for the VFL Seconds against the SAFL Seconds, in the curtain-raising match before the VFL/SAFL representative match on the MCG on 19 June 1954, Hart kicked seven goals.

=== Brighton (VFA) ===
Unable to play at all during 1955 due to knee problems, he went to Brighton Football Club in the Victorian Football Association (VFA) in 1956.

Over three seasons (1956–1958) he played 55 senior games and kicked 143 goals.

=== Mornington (MPFL) ===
He played 96 games and kicked 462 goals in his five seasons (1958–1962) with the Mornington Football Club in the Mornington Peninsula Football League.

== Death ==
He died on 8 February 2018.
