= Chris Kiernan =

Australian rules footballer and cricketer

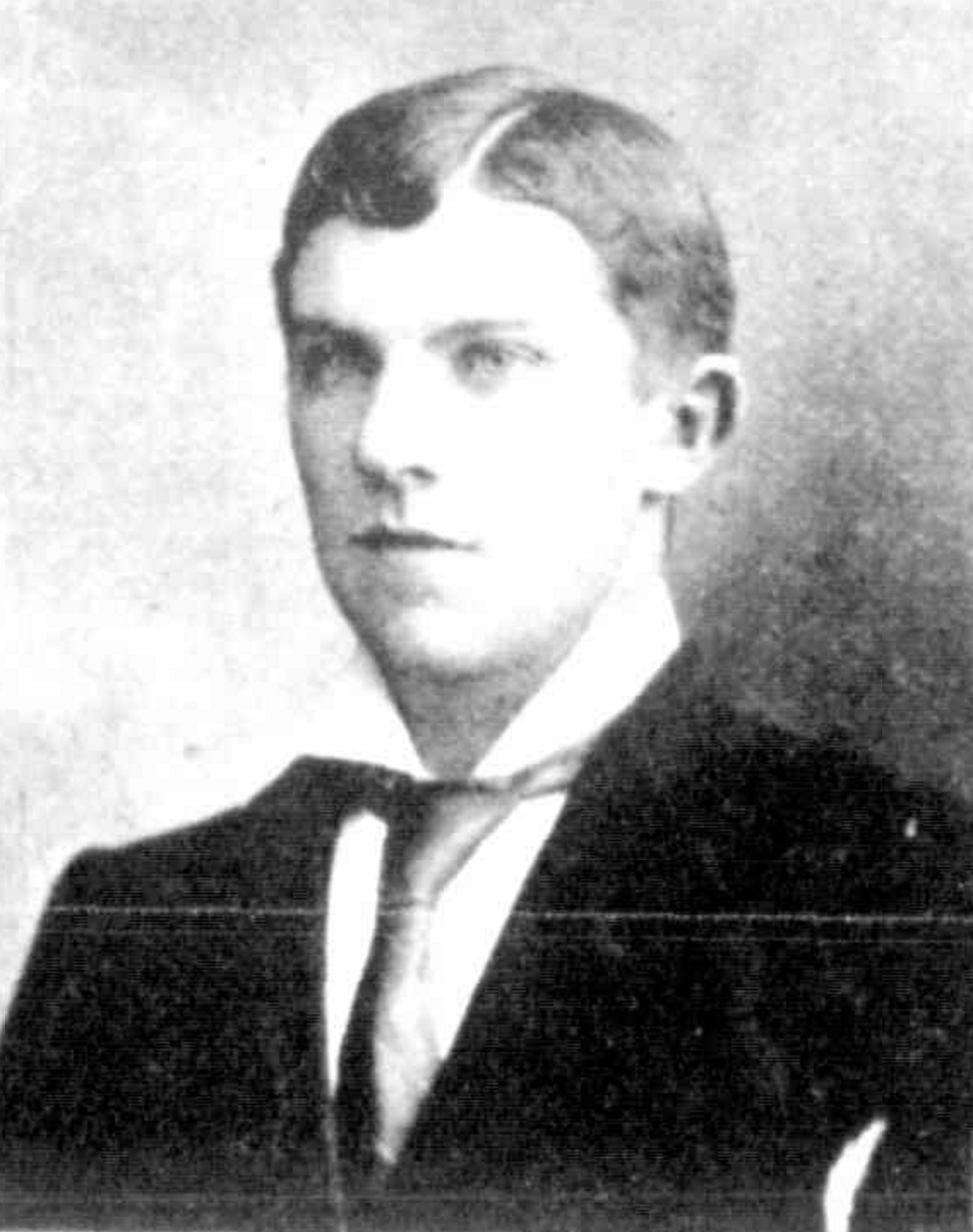
- Kiernan in 1899

Personal information
- Full name: Christopher Kiernan
- Born: 23 March 1878; Fitzroy, Victoria
- Died: 2 December 1925 (aged 47); Fitzroy North, Victoria

Playing career^{1}
Years	Club	Games (Goals)
1897–1903, 1911	Fitzroy	102 (110)
- ^{1} Playing statistics correct to the end of 1911.

Career highlights
- 2× VFL premiership player: 1898, 1899; 3× Fitzroy leading goalkicker: 1987, 1989, 1900

Chris Kiernan
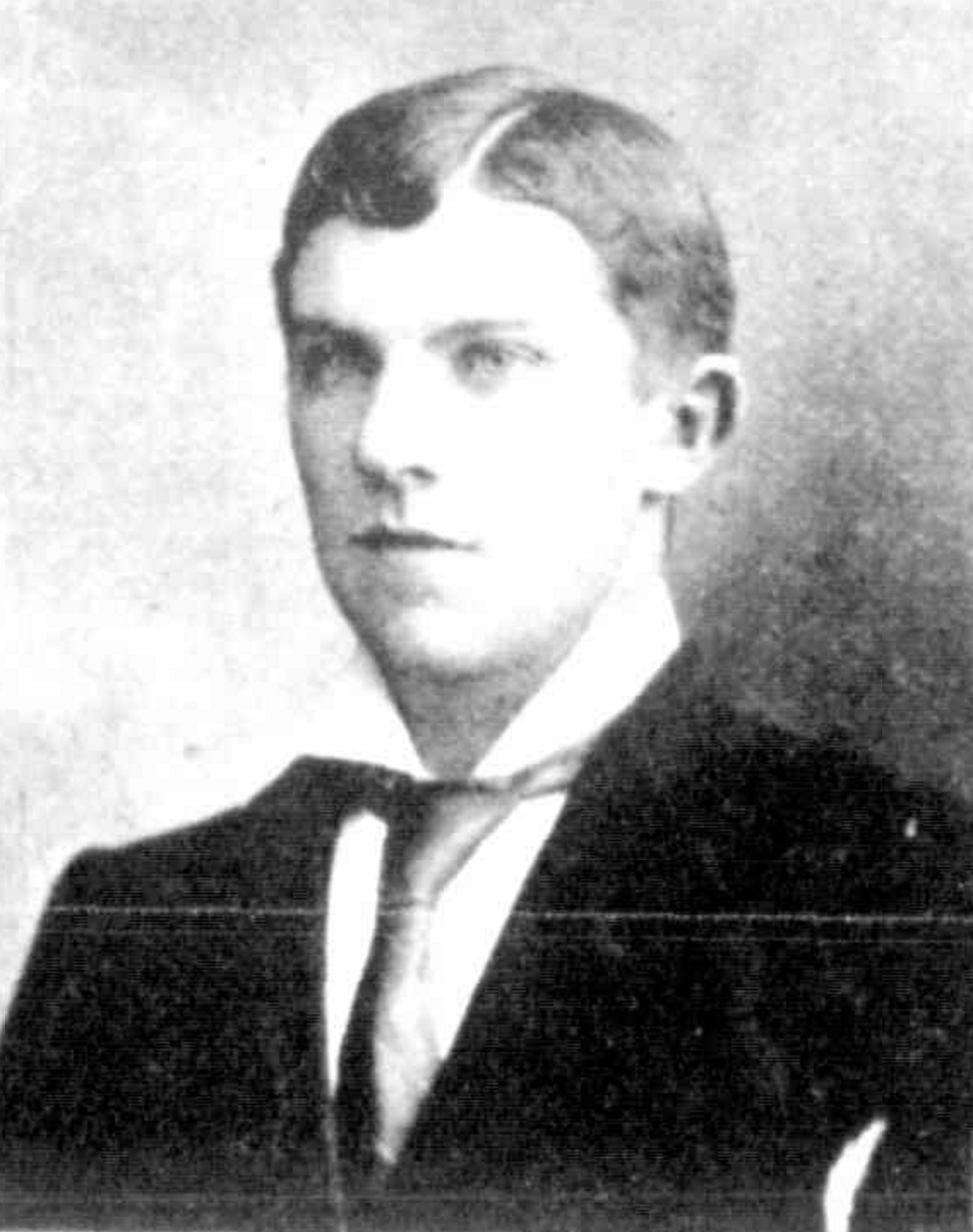

Cricket information
- Batting: Right-handed
- Bowling: Right-arm medium
- Role: All-rounder

Domestic team information
- Years: Team
- 1884/85: Victoria

Career statistics
Competition	First-class
Matches	10
Runs scored	366
Batting average	24.40
100s/50s	0/3
Top score	61
Balls bowled
Wickets	6
Bowling average	30.00
5 wickets in innings	0
10 wickets in match	0
Best bowling	2/45
Catches/stumpings	8/–
- Source: CricketArchive, 6 October 2026

Christopher Kiernan (23 March 1878 – 2 December 1925) was an Australian rules footballer who played for the Fitzroy Football Club in the early years of the Victorian Football League (VFL) and first-class cricketer.

Kiernan was a Fitzroy local and played for the Maroons in the inaugural VFL season, topping their goalkicking in their first two years, and again in 1900. He played in Fitzroy's 1898 premiership side as well as in two losing grand finals. Additionally, Kiernan was selected in Fitzroy's 1899 Grand Final side but failed to arrive at the ground on time and missed out on playing in a second premiership.

No stranger to controversy, Kiernan was accused of tripping his opponents in games, an accusation which was first raised by his own teammates following an interstate game. He fell out with the Fitzroy committee and in 1904 attempted to cross to Collingwood but his request was blocked by VFL delegates. Kiernan instead joined Victorian Football Association (VFA) club Brighton, but made a brief comeback at Fitzroy in 1911.

With his football career over, Kiernan turned his attention to cricket and from 1910 to 1919 played 10 first-class matches for Victoria, three of them in the Sheffield Shield. He scored a total of 366 runs at an average of 24.40 and took six wickets.

== See also ==
- List of Victoria first-class cricketers

== Sources ==
- Atkinson, G. (1982) Everything you ever wanted to know about Australian rules football but couldn't be bothered asking, The Five Mile Press: Melbourne. ISBN 0 86788 009 0.
