= Arthur Hart (footballer, born 1917) =

Australian rules footballer (1917–1981)

Personal information
- Full name: Arthur Robert Hart
- Born: 13 February 1917; Carlton, Victoria
- Died: 16 October 1981 (aged 64); Heidelberg Repatriation Hospital
- Original team: Raymonds
- Height: 182 cm (6 ft 0 in)
- Weight: 76 kg (168 lb)

Playing career^{1}
Years	Club	Games (Goals)
1938–1941	Fitzroy	38 (37)
- ^{1} Playing statistics correct to the end of 1941.

Arthur Robert Hart (13 February 1917 – 16 October 1981) was an Australian rules footballer who played for the Fitzroy Football Club in the Victorian Football League (VFL).

== Family ==
The son of Frederick Arthur Hart (1889-1948), and Elizabeth Hart (1889-1966), née King, Arthur Robert Hart was born at Carlton, Victoria on 13 February 1917. Two of his three brothers, Edward Ronald "Eddie" Hart (1922–1995) and Donald Clement "Don" Hart (1930–2018), also played for Fitzroy, as had his uncle Robert "Bob" King (1894–1979).

He married Mona Emily Stevens (1919–2010) on 19 April 1941.

== Football ==
He made his debut for Fitzroy, in the back-pocket, against Essendon, at Windy Hill, on 20 August 1938.

== Military service ==
He served in New Guinea as a Sergeant of Communication Signals in World War II.
