= George Shaw (footballer, born 1886) =

Australian rules footballer and umpire

Personal information
- Full name: George Shaw
- Nickname: Yorkie
- Born: 1 April 1886; Sydney, New South Wales
- Died: 30 April 1971 (aged 85); Fitzroy, Victoria
- Original team: Fitzroy juniors
- Height: 164 cm (5 ft 5 in)
- Weight: 65 kg (143 lb)
- Position: Rover

Playing career^{1}
Years	Club	Games (Goals)
1911–1920	Fitzroy	117 (48)
- ^{1} Playing statistics correct to the end of 1920.

George "Yorkie" Shaw (1 April 1886 – 30 April 1971) was an Australian rules footballer who played with Fitzroy in the Victorian Football League (VFL) during the 1910s.

== Football ==
At 164 cm, rover George Shaw was one of the smallest players in the game's history and kicked two goals in their 1913 Grand Final win against St Kilda. He also played in their premiership side in 1916, retiring in 1920 after playing 117 games for Fitzroy.

Following an unsuccessful pre-season trial with Richmond in 1922, Shaw took a position on the VFL field umpires list. Umpiring primarily in the Peninsula Football Association through 1922 and 1923, he was selected to umpire two VFL matches in August 1923, making his debut as a substitute for umpire Bob Scott, who was ill.

== Death ==
He died at Fitzroy, Victoria on 30 April 1971.
