= Alf Wilkinson =

Australian rules footballer

Personal information
- Full name: Alfred Harold Wilkinson
- Born: 31 December 1881; Collingwood, Victoria
- Died: 4 September 1938 (aged 56); Richmond, Victoria
- Original team: Clifton Hill
- Height: 179 cm (5 ft 10 in)
- Weight: 78 kg (172 lb)
- Position: Forward

Playing career^{1}
Years	Club	Games (Goals)
1901–1906, 1908	Fitzroy	80 (75)
- ^{1} Playing statistics correct to the end of 1908.

Career highlights
- VFL premiership player: 1905; Fitzroy leading goalkicker: 1905

Alfred Harold Wilkinson (31 December 1881 – 4 September 1938) was an Australian rules footballer who played for the Fitzroy Football Club in the Victorian Football League (VFL). He was Fitzroy's leading goalkicker in 1905 with 30 goals for the season.
