= Eddie Hart (Australian footballer) =

Australian rules footballer (1922–1995)

Personal information
- Full name: Edward Ronald Hart
- Born: 16 June 1922; North Fitzroy, Victoria
- Died: 16 August 1995 (aged 73); Heidelberg Repatriation Hospital
- Original team: Fitzroy Central School
- Height: 183 cm (6 ft 0 in)
- Weight: 80 kg (176 lb)

Playing career^{1}
Years	Club	Games (Goals)
1941, 1944–51	Fitzroy	98 (323)
- ^{1} Playing statistics correct to the end of 1951.

Edward Ronald "Eddie" Hart (16 June 1922 – 16 August 1995) was an Australian rules footballer who played with Fitzroy in the VFL during the 1940s.

From 1947 until 1951 Hart was Fitzroy's leading goalkicker, with over 50 goals in each season — his best season tally was 65 goals in 1951 — and, in 1948, 1949, and 1951, he was the VFL's third highest goal scorer in each season.

== Family ==
The son of Frederick Arthur Hart (1889-1948), and Elizabeth Hart (1889-1966), née King, Edward Ronald Hart was born at North Fitzroy, Victoria on 16 June 1922. Two of his three brothers, Arthur Robert Hart (1917 –1981) and Donald Clement "Don" Hart (1930–2018), also played for Fitzroy, as had his uncle Robert "Bob" King (1894–1979).

He married Laurel Violet Mills (1929-2015) in Carlton on 20 October 1951. They had two children, Barbara and Noel and three grandchildren Andrew, Timothy and Marcus.

== Football ==
A talented full-forward, he was a good, safe mark, and had pace when leading. His war service restricted a career that was brought to an end by an untimely injury.

=== Fitzroy (VFL) ===
He made his debut for Fitzroy, against Carlton, at Princes Park, on 21 June 1941, kicking two goals. Overall he played in 98 First XVIII matches for Fitzroy, kicking 323 goals.

=== Full-forward ===
As a full-forward he had a number of outstanding performances:

- 17 goals in a match: for Fitzroy Seconds, against Geelong, at Kardinia Park, on 27 July 1946.
- 9 goals in a match: against Essendon on 23 August 1947, and against Hawthorn on 20 May 1950.
- 8 goals in a match: against Hawthorn on 15 May 1948, and against South Melbourne on 4 June 1949.
- 7 goals in a match: against Footscray on 21 May 1949, against Collingwood on 15 July 1950, against Hawthorn on 12 August 1950, against Collingwood on 14 July 1951, and against North Melbourne on 1 September 1951.
  - The match against North Melbourne, at the Arden Street Oval, on 1 September 1951, the last of the season's home-and-away games, was Eddie Hart's last game for Fitzroy (with Fitzroy just missing the Finals at fifth place of the Ladder). He was not selected to play in the match, and was only in the team as a last-minute replacement for Eddie Goodger, unable to play because of influenza. With his brother Don playing on the half-forward flank, and dominating the North Melbourne full-back Jock McCorkell, he scored seven of Fitzroy team's 8 goals.
    "Had some of his team mates displayed the same fighting qualities, and spirit as Fitzroy full forward Eddie Hart did against North Melbourne the result may have been different. Although a last minute choice Hart gave a grand display of copybook full-forward play and his seven goals out of a total score of eight will long be remembered by Fitzroy supporters." — The Herald, 3 September 1951.
- 6 goals in a match: against Hawthorn on 31 August 1946, against Hawthorn on 14 June 1947, against South Melbourne on 12 June 1948, against Carlton on 23 April 1949, against Essendon on 18 June 1949, against North Melbourne on 2 July 1949, against St Kilda on 9 July 1949, against Carlton on 1 July 1950, against Footscray on 12 May 1951, and against Carlton on 19 May 1951.

=== Inter-State Representative ===
He represented Victoria, against a combined Riverina team, at Leeton, New South Wales, on 8 August 1948 (he scored 6 goals); and against New South Wales, at the Sydney Cricket Ground, on 16 July 1949 (he scored 8 goals).

=== Retirement ===
He retired before the 1952 season began, as a consequence of a knock to his head that he received during the 1951 season.
