= Percy Trotter =

Australian rules footballer (1883–1959)

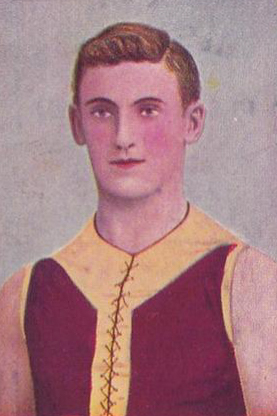
- Cigarette card of Trotter in 1905

Personal information
- Full name: Percival George Trotter
- Born: 1 September 1883; Fitzroy, Victoria
- Died: 27 August 1959 (aged 75); Willagee, Western Australia
- Original team: St Luke's Fitzroy

Playing career^{1}
Years	Club	Games (Goals)
1901–1906	Fitzroy	109 (145)
1907–1909	Essendon Association	32 (74)
1910–1919	East Fremantle	59 (72)
Total		200 (291)
- ^{1} Playing statistics correct to the end of 1919.

Career highlights
- AIF Pioneer Exhibition Game, London, 28 October 1916; 2× VFL premiership player: 1904, 1905; Fitzroy Club Champion: 1903; 4× Fitzroy leading goalkicker: 1902, 1903, 1904, 1906; VFL interstate representative (2 games, 6 goals); Fitzroy team of the century

Percival George "Percy" Trotter (1 September 1883 – 27 August 1959) was an Australian rules footballer who played for the Fitzroy Football Club in the Victorian Football League (VFL), Essendon Association in the Victorian Football Association (VFA) and East Fremantle in the West Australian Football League (WAFL).

== Family ==
The son of George Thomas Trotter (1858-1910), and Mary Trotter (1857-1951), née Brookman, Percival George Trotter was born at Fitzroy, Victoria on 1 September 1883.

He married Annie Ethel Martin (1887-1928) on 5 October 1904.

His great nephew Barrie Trotter played two games for Richmond in 1979.

== Football career ==
=== Fitzroy (VFL) ===
Trotter played as a rover and was versatile in that he could kick well with both feet. He debuted in 1901 at the age of 18. In 2002 Trotter was named on the interchange bench in Fitzroy's official 'Team of the Century'.

=== East Fremantle (WAFL) ===
Trotter's time with East Fremantle was interrupted by his service in World War I.

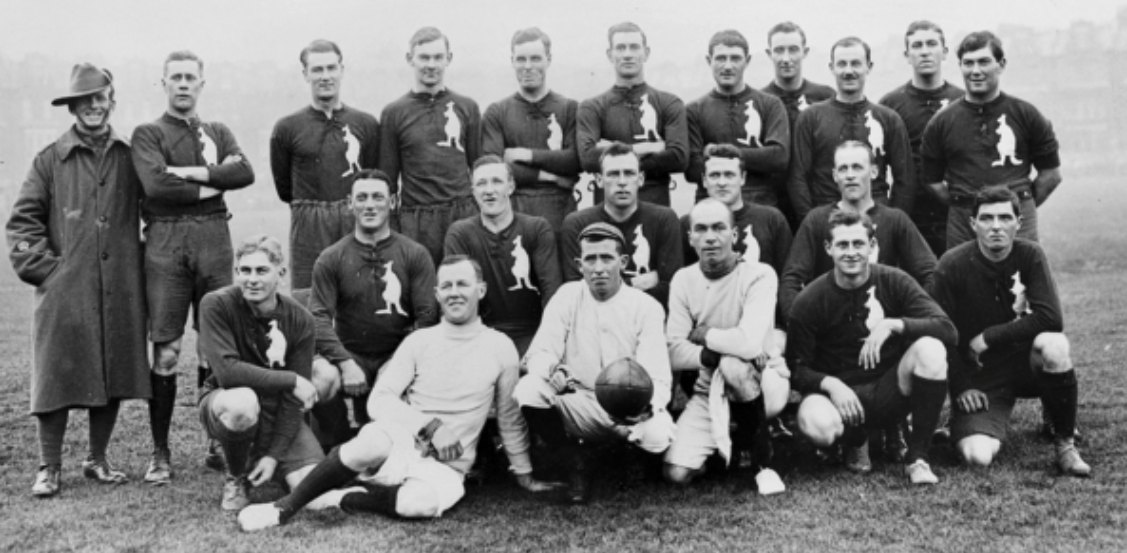
The Australian Training Units Team: 28 October 1916. Percy Trotter is at the left of the five in the middle row.

=== Training Units team (AIF) ===
He played in the famous "Pioneer Exhibition Game" of Australian Rules football, held in London, in October 1916. A news film was taken at the match.

== See also ==
- 1916 Pioneer Exhibition Game
