= 1981 Brownlow Medal =

- Winners: Bernie Quinlan (Fitzroy); Barry Round (South Melbourne); 22 votes

Television/radio coverage
- Network: Seven Network

The 1981 Brownlow Medal was the 54th year the award was presented to the player adjudged the fairest and best player during the Victorian Football League (VFL) home and away season. Bernie Quinlan of the Fitzroy Football Club and Barry Round of the South Melbourne Football Club both won the medal by polling twenty-two votes during the 1981 VFL season.

Prior the 1981 season, the VFL amended the rules to allow for the awarding Brownlow Medals jointly to all players tied for the most votes; this eliminated tie-breakers which had previously been in place to ensure there would be only a single winner. The tie between Round and Quinlan meant that this new provision was used in its first season.

== Leading votegetters ==
	Player	Votes
=1st	Bernie Quinlan (Fitzroy)	22
=1st	Barry Round (South Melbourne)	22
3rd	Rodney Ashman (Carlton)	21
4th	Peter Moore (Collingwood)	16
=5th	Merv Neagle (Essendon)	15
=5th	John Mossop (Geelong)	15
=5th	Trevor Barker (St Kilda)	15
8th	Tony Buhagiar (Essendon)	14
9th	Geoff Cunningham (St Kilda)	13
10th	Ken Hunter (Carlton)	12
