= Charlie Brown (footballer, born 1896) =

Australian rules footballer

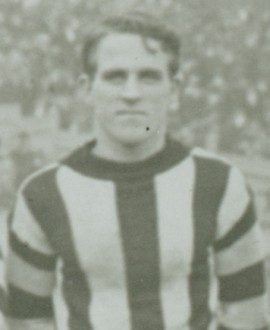
- Brown during his Collingwood career

Personal information
- Full name: Charles Wilson Brown
- Born: 30 April 1896; Carlton, Victoria
- Died: 9 April 1956 (aged 59); Fitzroy, Victoria
- Original team: Balmain
- Debut: Round 1, 6 May 1916, Collingwood vs. Richmond, at Punt Rd

Playing career^{1}
Years	Club	Games (Goals)
1916–1923	Collingwood	107 (2)
- ^{1} Playing statistics correct to the end of 1923.

Career highlights
- 1917 premiership team

Charles Wilson Brown (30 April 1896 – 9 April 1956) was an Australian rules footballer who played for Collingwood in the Victorian Football League (VFL).

Brown played juniors with Balmain Junior Football Club in the Victorian Metropolitan Football League.

Brown played as a defender over eight seasons for Collingwood in the VFL. In his second season, Brown won a premiership with Collingwood in their Grand Final win over Fitzroy.
