= Percy Heron =

Australian rules footballer

Personal information
- Full name: John Percival Maxwell Heron
- Born: 25 December 1892; Clifton Hill, Victoria
- Died: 5 August 1950 (aged 57); Heidelberg, Victoria
- Original team: Fitzroy Juniors
- Height: 168 cm (5 ft 6 in)
- Weight: 74 kg (163 lb)

Playing career^{1}
Years	Club	Games (Goals)
1912–1915	Fitzroy	46 (17)
- ^{1} Playing statistics correct to the end of 1914.

Career highlights
- Fitzroy premiership player 1913

John Percival Maxwell Heron (25 December 1892 – 5 August 1950) was an Australian rules football player at the Fitzroy Football Club in the Victorian Football League (VFL). He became a premiership player at Fitroy, playing in the 1913 VFL Grand Final, under the captaincy of Bill Walker, with Percy Parratt as coach. Heron made his debut against Geelong in Round 3 of the 1912 VFL season, at the Brunswick Street Oval. His brother Hugh was also an Australian rules footballer.
