= Bernie Quinlan =

Australian rules footballer, born 1951

Personal information
- Full name: Bernard Francis Quinlan
- Nickname: Superboot
- Born: 21 July 1951 (age 75)
- Original team: Traralgon
- Height: 193 cm (6 ft 4 in)
- Weight: 97 kg (214 lb)
- Position: Centre half forward/centre half back/ruck-rover

Playing career^{1}
Years	Club	Games (Goals)
1969–1977	Footscray	177 (241)
1978–1986	Fitzroy	189 (576)
Total		366 (817)

Representative team honours
Years	Team	Games (Goals)
	Victoria	4 (6)

Coaching career^{3}
Years	Club	Games (W–L–D)
1995	Fitzroy	19 (2–17–0)
- ^{1} Playing statistics correct to the end of 1986.^{3} Coaching statistics correct as of 1995.

Career highlights
- Brownlow Medal: (1981); 2x Coleman Medal: (1983, 1984); 5x Fitzroy leading goalkicker: (1981, 1982, 1983, 1984, 1985); Footscray leading goalkicker: (1971); Australian Football Hall of Fame, inducted 1996; Fitzroy Team of the Century: (centre half forward); Brisbane Lions Hall of Fame.

Bernard Francis Quinlan (born 21 July 1951) is a former Australian rules footballer who played for the Footscray Football Club and Fitzroy Football Club in the Victorian Football League (VFL).

One of a handful of players to have won a Brownlow Medal and Coleman Medal, Quinlan was an inaugural inductee in the Australian Football Hall of Fame in 1996. His long kicking earned him the nickname "Superboot". Quinlan played his best football late in his career, earning most of his individual accolades after he had turned 30. He holds the record for the most career games without playing in a Grand Final and is one of five VFL/AFL players (the others being Shaun Burgoyne, Heath Shaw, Lance Franklin and Patrick Dangerfield) to have played 150 or more games at two separate clubs. Additionally, he is the only player in VFL/AFL history to have kicked 100 goals in a season (which he did twice), play 300+ games, and win a Brownlow medal.

== Playing career ==
Quinlan was recruited from Traralgon, which was in Footscray's zone, and arrived at Footscray halfway through the 1969 VFL season. Teammate Barry Round also made his debut in the same year, and coincidentally they would tie for the Brownlow Medal 12 years later in 1981, both by that time playing at different clubs.

Quinlan played 177 games for the club, playing mostly at centre half-forward (also occasionally playing as a centre half-back). The 1970s were a tough time financially for the Bulldogs, and many quality players were cleared to other clubs. Quinlan was cleared to Fitzroy in 1978 for 70,000 dollars. In October 1979, Quinlan was fined $500 for missing two training sessions with the Victorian squad the previous month. Quinlan had recently moved to Baxter and complained that he had not been notified in time by Fitzroy, but the VFL's administration manager Alan Schwab dismissed these as "inadequate excuses". In the end, he was left out of the squad going to Perth for the State of Origin Carnival. In December 1979, the Lions and the football public were shocked when it was announced by club president Frank Bibby that Quinlan had told the committee he wanted to devote more time to his farm. With a year remaining on his contract, Fitzroy were desperate to retain his services and made Quinlan a substantial financial offer to stay. Quinlan relented and returned for the 1980 VFL season.

Fitzroy had an ordinary season in 1980. When Robert Walls took over as senior coach for 1981, Quinlan and the Lions returned to form. He won the Brownlow Medal in 1981, tying with his former Bulldog teammate Barry Round (who had left the Bulldogs too by this stage). He also twice kicked more than 100 goals in a season: 1983 and 1984. Quinlan led a formidable forward line in the mid-1980s with the likes of Michael Conlan, Garry Wilson, David McMahon and Gary Sidebottom. Together with Paul Roos and Gary Pert in the back line, they propelled Fitzroy to their most successful years in the post-war era.

He was nicknamed "Superboot". He was regularly featured in the World of Sport kicking competitions, a sports program which was popular in Melbourne for three decades.

== Playing statistics ==
Legend
G	Goals	K	Kicks	D	Disposals	T	Tackles
B	Behinds	H	Handballs	M	Marks

Led the league after season and finals

Season	Team	No.	Games	Totals							Averages (per game)						
Season	Team	No.	Games	G	B	K	H	D	M	T	G	B	K	H	D	M	T
1969	Footscray	2	9	18	16	99	7	106	46	—N/a	2.0	1.8	11.0	0.8	11.8	5.1	—N/a
1970	Footscray	2	21	12	25	292	26	318	109	—N/a	0.6	1.2	13.9	1.2	15.1	5.2	—N/a
1971	Footscray	2	21	48	47	343	61	404	168	—N/a	2.3	2.2	16.3	2.9	19.2	8.0	—N/a
1972	Footscray	2	21	37	41	304	79	383	112	—N/a	1.8	2.0	14.5	3.8	18.2	5.3	—N/a
1973	Footscray	2	20	20	23	301	83	384	115	—N/a	1.0	1.2	15.1	4.2	19.2	5.8	—N/a
1974	Footscray	2	18	9	7	272	44	316	80	—N/a	0.5	0.4	15.1	2.4	17.6	4.7	—N/a
1975	Footscray	2	22	36	17	285	46	331	100	—N/a	1.6	0.8	13.6	2.2	15.8	4.8	—N/a
1976	Footscray	2	23	34	39	311	83	394	109	—N/a	1.5	1.7	13.5	3.6	17.1	4.7	—N/a
1977	Footscray	2	22	27	38	311	92	403	126	—N/a	1.2	1.8	14.1	4.2	18.3	5.7	—N/a
1978	Fitzroy	5	14	18	15	198	62	260	77	—N/a	1.3	1.1	14.1	4.4	18.6	5.5	—N/a
1979	Fitzroy	5	22	48	39	313	106	419	116	—N/a	2.2	1.8	14.2	4.8	19.0	5.3	—N/a
1980	Fitzroy	5	22	27	29	325	110	435	123	—N/a	1.2	1.3	14.8	5.0	19.8	5.6	—N/a
1981	Fitzroy	5	24	73	32	332	116	448	152	—N/a	3.0	1.3	13.8	4.8	18.7	6.3	—N/a
1982	Fitzroy	5	21	53	35	289	96	385	108	—N/a	2.5	1.7	13.8	4.6	18.3	5.1	—N/a
1983	Fitzroy	5	24	116	70	268	62	330	155	—N/a	4.8	2.9	11.2	2.6	13.8	6.5	—N/a
1984	Fitzroy	5	23	105	44	228	48	276	121	—N/a	4.6	1.9	9.9	2.1	12.0	5.3	—N/a
1985	Fitzroy	5	22	84	58	229	45	274	127	—N/a	3.8	2.6	10.4	2.0	12.5	5.8	—N/a
1986	Fitzroy	5	17	52	37	149	34	183	73	—N/a	3.1	2.2	8.8	2.0	10.8	4.3	—N/a
Career			366	817	612	4849	1200	6049	2017	—N/a	2.2	1.7	13.3	3.3	16.6	5.5	—N/a

== Life off the field ==
Quinlan was picked up in the January 1972 national service intake and posted to Puckapunyal with Footscray teammate Peter Welsh. He served in the Service Corp unit and rose to the rank of Lance Corporal. During his playing career, Quinlan worked as a clerk for the State Electricity Commission of Victoria. He said in later years that he considered it a "dead-end job" and wished he had taken up a trade instead.
After retiring as a player, Quinlan first joined the ABC football commentary team when they had the broadcasting rights in 1987, and then switched to the Seven Network when they regained the rights in 1988. He worked as a commentator with the Seven Network until 1995.

=== Fitzroy Football Club senior coach ===
Quinlan returned to Fitzroy as senior coach for the 1995 AFL season, when he replaced Robert Shaw, who left at the end of the 1994 season. However, it soon became clear that he was out of his depth as a senior coach and was sacked after a 126-point loss to Sydney Swans in Round 19, 1995. It was later revealed that senior player John McCarthy was one of the key voices in having him removed. Quinlan was then replaced by Alan McConnell as caretaker senior coach of Fitzroy Football Club for the rest of the 1995 season.

The Brisbane Lions mascot Bernie "Gabba" Vegas is partially named as a tribute to Quinlan.

=== Other roles ===
In 2017, Quinlan joined former footballers Don Scott and Tony Jewell to form a landscaping and gardening crew, doing odd jobs around the Mornington Peninsula.

He has worked as a weights coach with VFL team Port Melbourne.

== Bibliography ==
- Cullen, Barbara (2015). Harder than Football. The Slattery Media Group. ISBN 9780992379148.
