= Tony Ongarello =

Australian rules footballer (1932–2022)

Personal information
- Full name: Anthony Silvio Bartolo Ongarello
- Born: 22 December 1932
- Died: 18 July 2022 (aged 89); Prahran, Victoria
- Original team: Thornbury YCW
- Height: 185 cm (6 ft 1 in)
- Weight: 81 kg (179 lb)

Playing career^{1}
Years	Club	Games (Goals)
1952–1960	Fitzroy	131 (247)
- ^{1} Playing statistics correct to the end of 1960.

Career highlights
- Fitzroy leading goalkicker 1952, 1956 & 1958

Tony Ongarello (22 December 1932 – 18 July 2022) was an Australian rules footballer of Italian heritage who played with Fitzroy in the VFL from 1952 to 1960. He played most of his career at full-forward.

Ongarello is believed to be the last player in the VFL/AFL to have scored a goal from a place kick, scoring two goals from the kicks late in Fitzroy's narrow loss to Geelong in 1955 at Brunswick Street Oval. He was also the last player to attempt a place kick. Ongarello reportedly switched to the place kicks after missing several consecutive set shots from punt kicks in the game.

He appeared regularly on ABC television Australian rules football panels in Victoria in the 1960s and 1970s.
