= Claude Curtin =

Australian rules footballer

Personal information
- Full name: Claude Frederick Curtin
- Born: 4 July 1920; Brunswick, Victoria
- Died: 13 December 1994 (aged 74)
- Original team: Fitzroy CYMS (CYMSFA)
- Height: 183 cm (6 ft 0 in)
- Weight: 83 kg (183 lb)

Playing career^{1}
Years	Club	Games (Goals)
1939–1947	Fitzroy	91 (268)
1948	North Melbourne	4 (7)
1949	Fitzroy	2 (1)
Total		97 (276)
- ^{1} Playing statistics correct to the end of 1949.

Claude Frederick Curtin (4 July 1920 – 13 December 1994) was an Australian rules footballer who played with Fitzroy in the VFL.

A full-forward, Curtin was recruited from Fitzroy Catholic Young Men's Society (CYMS) Football Club and made his senior VFL debut in 1939. He kicked over fifty goals in a season on four occasions, from 1940 to 1942 and in 1946, topping Fitzroy's goalkicking each time. He would have been a member of the club's 1944 premiership side had he not be away on war service.

== Family ==
Curtin's uncle was former Australian Prime Minister John Curtin, while his grandson is former Fitzroy, Brisbane Lions and Hawthorn player John Barker.
