= Joe Shortill =

Australian rules footballer

Personal information
- Full name: Joseph Francis Shortill
- Born: 2 December 1894; Kyneton, Victoria
- Died: 22 February 1970 (aged 75); Coburg, Victoria
- Original team: Ballarat
- Height: 183 cm (6 ft 0 in)
- Weight: 82 kg (181 lb)

Playing career^{1}
Years	Club	Games (Goals)
1915–18	Carlton	35 (25)
1919	Fitzroy	6 (3)
Total		41 (28)
- ^{1} Playing statistics correct to the end of 1919.

Joseph Francis Shortill (2 December 1894 – 22 February 1970) was an Australian rules footballer who played with Carlton and Fitzroy in the Victorian Football League (VFL).
