= Herb Friend =

Australian rules footballer

Personal information
- Full name: Herbert Thomas Friend
- Born: 6 July 1888; South Melbourne, Victoria
- Died: 13 March 1954 (aged 65); Preston, Victoria
- Original team: South Melbourne Juniors

Playing career^{1}
Years	Club	Games (Goals)
1908	Melbourne	2 (0)
1910	St Kilda	1 (0)
Total		3 (0)
- ^{1} Playing statistics correct to the end of 1910.

Herbert Thomas Friend (6 July 1888 – 13 March 1954) was an Australian rules footballer who played with Melbourne and St Kilda in the Victorian Football League (VFL).
