= Alec Mutch =

Australian rules footballer and umpire

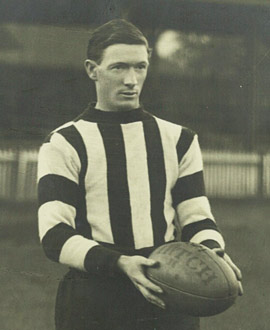
- Mutch in 1919

Personal information
- Full name: Alexander Charles Mutch
- Born: 31 March 1889; Collingwood, Victoria
- Died: 30 May 1960 (aged 71); Brunswick, Victoria
- Original team: Collingwood District
- Debut: Round 1, 1911, Collingwood vs. Richmond, at Victoria Park
- Height: 179 cm (5 ft 10 in)
- Weight: 74 kg (163 lb)

Playing career^{1}
Years	Club	Games (Goals)
1911–1921	Collingwood	144 (5)
- ^{1} Playing statistics correct to the end of 1921.

Alexander Charles Mutch (31 March 1889 – 30 May 1960) was an Australian rules footballer and umpire who played with Collingwood in the VFL during the 1910s and early 1920s. He was also known as Alex Mutch.

A defender who was used mainly in the back pocket, Mutch made his VFL debut in 1911 in the same game as future Hall of Famer Dan Minogue. He was a member of Collingwood's 1917 premiership team and was one of the 'Best on Ground' in another Grand Final win two years later.

Mutch later umpired 47 VFL games between 1923 and 1927 which included three finals and one grand final.
