= Bob Merrick =

Australian rules footballer

Personal information
- Born: 23 July 1893; Darlinghurst, New South Wales
- Died: 24 October 1981 (aged 88); Kew, Victoria
- Original teams: East Sydney, Port Melbourne (VFA)
- Height: 175 cm (5 ft 9 in)
- Weight: 73 kg (161 lb)

Playing career^{1}
Years	Club	Games (Goals)
1919–1922, 1926	Fitzroy	59 (181)
- ^{1} Playing statistics correct to the end of 1926.

Robert 'Bob' Merrick (23 July 1893 – 24 October 1981) was an Australian rules footballer who played for Fitzroy in the VFL.

== Personal life ==
Merrick was born at Darlinghurst, New South Wales, the son of Robert and Lillian Rose Merrick. He was a printer by trade. He married Minnie Ruth Duncan in 1917 at Redfern, New South Wales, and they had two children, John Robert and Kathleen Helen. He was survived by each of them when he died on 24 October 1981.

External image
- R. Merrick, Port Melbourne's goal scorer.

== Playing ==
Prior to joining Fitzroy, Merrick played his football with Port Melbourne in the VFA, finishing the 1915 VFA season as the VFA's leading goalkicker, and later (1917-1918) with East Sydney in the NSWAFL.

He debuted for Fitzroy in 1919 and playing as a full-forward, topped Fitzroy's goalkicking every year until he left in 1922, with 42, 53, 32 and 47 goals respectively. Unlucky not to play in a premiership, he missed out on the Maroon's 1922 premiership side due to a knee injury. He shares with Jack Moriarty the record for most goals in a match by a Fitzroy player, kicking 12 goals in his club's Round 16 encounter with Melbourne at Brunswick Street Oval in 1919.

Merrick coached Benalla Football Club in the Ovens & Murray Football League in 1925.

Merrick made a brief comeback with Fitzroy in 1926 but could only manage five games before an injured shoulder saw him omitted from the side. He completed his senior football career back at Port Melbourne for the remainder of 1926 and entire 1927–28 seasons.

From 1930 to 1934 Merrick played in the Wednesday league for Yellow Cabs booting four goals in winning 1930 and 1934 Grand Final teams and two in the 1931 premiership loss. It was during this stint that, according to a story told by Jack Dyer, Merrick abused the ball and an all in fight resulted when an opponent assumed the abuse was directed at him.

== Umpiring ==
After missing out on the 1922 VFL Grand Final Merrick took a break from playing and began what was to become an intermittent umpiring career.

He was appointed by the North West Football Union (NWFU) in 1923; but his knee proved restrictive even for umpiring, and he resigned his appointment without making the trip to Tasmania.

Merrick's activities in 1924 are undocumented but by April 1925 he had been appointed captain-coach of Benalla and had the team in rigorous pre-season training. He starred in the opening round kicking seven goals against Rutherglen where "his marking and snapshots were just as good as when he was the idol of Fitzroy". Three more goals against Albury and two against Hume Weir and it appeared he was back in form. In early June Merrick resigned from Benalla and by the middle of the month had once again taken up the whistle, this time in the Barrier Ranges Football Association (BRFA). It was an interesting selection given Merrick's relative inexperience against a list of applicants that included Les Netherton, a VFL umpire with 16 senior matches to his credit and a further 72 VCFL appointments over four seasons. Merrick's readiness to travel at once, and paying the fares of his family himself, seems to have been the difference.

His term in Broken Hill was initially successful on the field. He was even able to assist in the training of the BRFA representative team as the prepared for a match against a touring South Australian team. Off the field the local umpires association, of which both Merrick and J. Cameron (also of Melbourne) were members came into dispute with the league over match fee demands and the accusations of bias on the part of several members by the Souths club. In a tit-for-tat affair the umpires' association withdrew its services for the round scheduled for 15 August and the Souths club refused to field a team. Industrial peace was never restored and the season never completed. Due to limited matches now being available, Merrick was dismissed by the BRFA.

Following his football comeback in 1926–28 Merrick applied for a position with the VFL, initially as a boundary umpire. He was appointed for the 1929 season but it seems likely that some injury delayed his start as there is no reference to his taking the field until 6 July. By the end of the season he had umpired five VCFL matches.
