= Kevin Wright (Australian footballer) =

Australian rules footballer and coach (1933–2003)

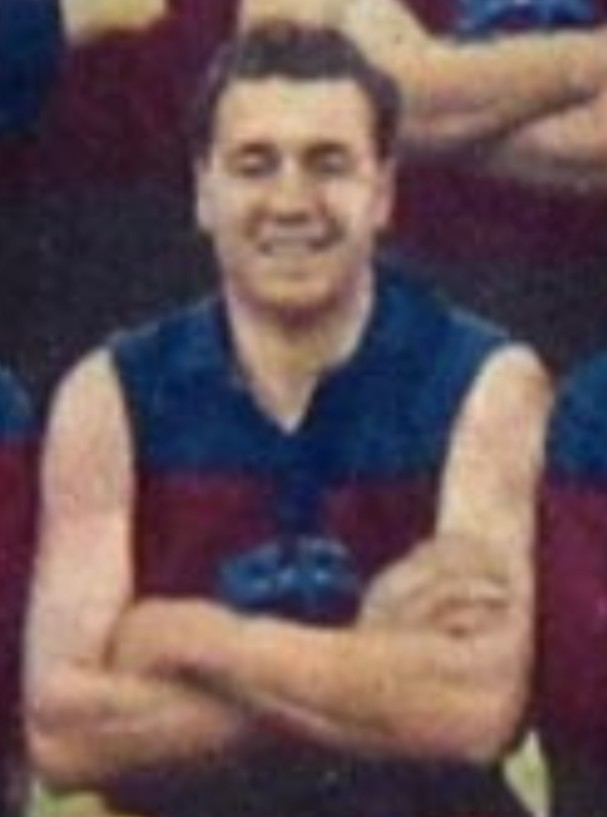
- Wright with Fitzroy in August 1954

Personal information
- Full name: Kevin Wright
- Born: 19 February 1933
- Died: 3 October 2003 (aged 70)
- Original team: Fitzroy Thirds
- Height: 178 cm (5 ft 10 in)
- Weight: 76 kg (168 lb)

Playing career^{1}
Years	Club	Games (Goals)
1952–1961	Fitzroy	140 (160)
- ^{1} Playing statistics correct to the end of 1961.

Kevin Wright (19 February 1933 – 3 October 2003) was an Australian rules footballer who played for Fitzroy in the Victorian Football League (VFL) and Dandenong in the Victorian Football Association (VFA).

Wright was used initially in the midfield, either as a centre, rover or wingman. Towards the end of his career he played more as a forward after establishing himself with a six-goal haul in the opening round of the 1958 VFL season. He kicked 43 in 1959 to top Fitzroy's goal-kicking and was their most prolific forward again the following season with 36 goals. He played as number 13.

Wright moved to the Dandenong Football Club in the Victorian Football Association in 1962, and served there as captain-coach until 1964; he led the club to a Division 2 premiership in 1962, and kicked six goals in the grand final. After leaving Dandenong, Wright returned to Fitzroy where he became a director. He also spent a season, in 1972, as non-playing coach of Preston.
