= Charlie Lee (Australian footballer) =

Australian rules footballer

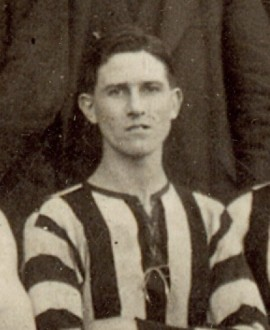
- Lee during his career

Personal information
- Full name: Charles Thomas Alfred Lee
- Born: 11 August 1896; Carlton, Victoria
- Died: 15 June 1979 (aged 82); Ballarat, Victoria
- Original team: Balmain (MDL)
- Debut: 13 May 1916, Collingwood vs. Carlton, at Victoria Park
- Height: 183 cm (6 ft 0 in)
- Weight: 73 kg (161 lb)

Playing career^{1}
Years	Club	Games (Goals)
1916–1919, 1923	Collingwood	47 (13)
- ^{1} Playing statistics correct to the end of 1923.

Career highlights
- 1917 Premiership Team

Charles Thomas Alfred Lee (11 August 1896 – 15 June 1979) was an Australian rules footballer who played with Collingwood in the Victorian Football League (VFL).

In his second season Lee won a premiership when Collingwood defeated Fitzroy in the Grand Final of 1917.

After playing in Collingwood's loss to Richmond in the 1919 Preliminary Final, Lee did not return the following week to play in Collingwood's winning 1919 Grand Final team.

This was to be Lee's final VFL game until he returned to Collingwood four years later, in 1923. During that season, Lee played a further eight more games to finish his career with 47 games and 13 goals.
