= Bob Bowden =

Australian rules footballer (1887–1964)

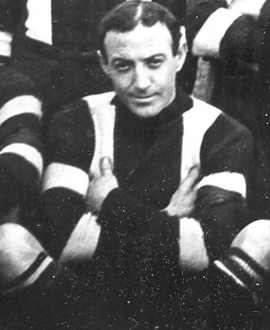
- Bowden in 1906

Personal information
- Full name: Robert Emmett Bowden
- Born: 29 March 1887; Richmond, Victoria
- Died: 17 October 1964 (aged 77); Windsor, Victoria
- Original team: Burnley
- Height: 168 cm (5 ft 6 in)
- Weight: 68 kg (150 lb)

Playing career^{1}
Years	Club	Games (Goals)
1906	Collingwood	1 (0)
1908–12	Richmond	83 (5)
1913–15, 1918–19	St Kilda	66 (0)
Total		150 (5)
- ^{1} Playing statistics correct to the end of 1919.

Robert Emmett Bowden (29 March 1887 – 17 October 1964) was an Australian rules footballer who played with Collingwood, Richmond, and St Kilda in the Victorian Football League (VFL).

Bowden, a wingman, came from Burnley originally and started his league career at Collingwood. He joined Richmond in 1908 for the club's inaugural VFL season and took part in their first ever game, eventually amassing a club record 83 appearances by the time he crossed to St Kilda in 1913. Playing on a wing, He was a member of St Kilda's losing 1913 VFL Grand Final team.
