= Carl Keller =

Australian rules footballer

Personal information
- Full name: Carl Keller
- Born: 9 July 1893
- Died: 17 June 1981 (aged 87)
- Original team: Preston
- Height: 168 cm (5 ft 6 in)
- Weight: 68 kg (150 lb)

Playing career^{1}
Years	Club	Games (Goals)
1917–23	Fitzroy	85 (5)
1925	Carlton	1 (0)
Total		86 (5)
- ^{1} Playing statistics correct to the end of 1925.

Carl Keller (9 July 1893 – 17 June 1981) was an Australian rules footballer who played with Carlton and Fitzroy in the Victorian Football League (VFL).
