= Ted Collins (Australian footballer) =

Australian rules footballer

Personal information
- Full name: Edward Victor Collins
- Born: 22 September 1893; Port Melbourne, Victoria
- Died: 4 May 1974 (aged 80); Coburg, Victoria
- Original team: Port Melbourne Juniors
- Height: 168 cm (5 ft 6 in)
- Weight: 67 kg (148 lb)
- Position: Wing

Playing career^{1}
Years	Club	Games (Goals)
1913–15, 1918–21	St Kilda	78 (27)
- ^{1} Playing statistics correct to the end of 1921.

Edward Victor Collins (22 September 1893 - 4 May 1974) was an Australian rules footballer who played with St Kilda in the Victorian Football League (VFL).
