= Phil Lynch =

Australian rules footballer

Personal information
- Full name: Phillip Lynch
- Born: 13 May 1890; Tylden, Victoria
- Died: 15 August 1960 (aged 70); South Australia
- Original team: Trentham
- Height: 183 cm (6 ft 0 in)
- Weight: 80 kg (176 lb)

Playing career^{1}
Years	Club	Games (Goals)
1912–13	St Kilda	33 (24)
- ^{1} Playing statistics correct to the end of 1913.

Phil Lynch (13 May 1890 – 15 August 1960) was an Australian rules footballer who played with St Kilda in the Victorian Football League (VFL).
