= Eddie Goodger =

Australian rules footballer

Personal information
- Full name: Edmund James Goodger
- Born: 10 March 1929
- Original team: Heidelberg
- Height: 188 cm (6 ft 2 in)
- Weight: 87 kg (192 lb)

Playing career^{1}
Years	Club	Games (Goals)
1949–1958	Fitzroy	149 (1)
- ^{1} Playing statistics correct to the end of 1958.

Edmund James Goodger (born 10 March 1929) is a former Australian rules footballer who played with Fitzroy in the Victorian Football League (VFL).

Goodger came to Fitzroy from Heidelberg, where he had won a best and fairest in 1948.

A defender, he spent much of his time at Fitzroy as a centre half-back, but also played in the ruck.

Goodger was second to Neville Broderick in Fitzroy's 1952 "best and fairest" award, missing out by a single vote.

He left Fitzroy at the end of the 1958 VFL season, to join Ivanhoe Amateurs as a playing coach.
