= Gerald P. Ryan =

Australian rules footballer

Gerald Ryan
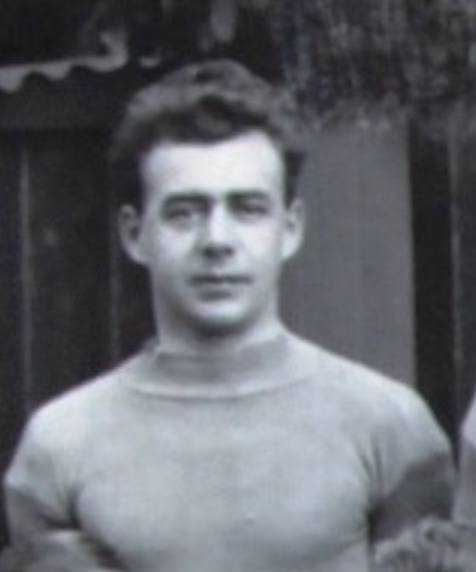
- Ryan in 1922, representing New South Wales against Victoria

Personal information
- Full name: Gerald Patrick Ryan
- Born: 27 December 1895
- Died: 4 October 1974 (aged 78)
- Original team: Middle Park CYMS (CYMSFA)
- Height: 180 cm (5 ft 11 in)
- Weight: 72 kg (159 lb)

Playing career^{1}
Years	Club	Games (Goals)
1917–1918	South Melbourne	26 (37)
- ^{1} Playing statistics correct to the end of 1918.

Gerald Patrick Ryan (27 December 1895 – 4 October 1974) was an Australian rules footballer who played with South Melbourne in the VFL.

A full-forward originally from CYMS Football Association (CYMSFA) club Middle Park CYMS, Ryan spent two seasons at South Melbourne. He had a big impact in their 1918 premiership year, topping the club's goalkicking with 32 goals and kicking three in the Grand Final.

Ryan subsequently played for North Sydney in the NSW Australian rules football competition and represented New South Wales against Victoria.

== Sources ==
- Holmesby, Russell and Main, Jim (2007). The Encyclopedia of AFL Footballers. 7th ed. Melbourne: Bas Publishing.
