= George Morrissey =

Australian rules footballer

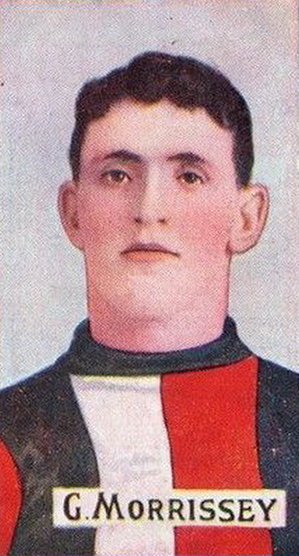
- Cigarette card of Morrissey in 1909

Personal information
- Full name: George Morrissey
- Born: 1 January 1883; Timor, Victoria
- Died: 7 December 1964 (aged 81); South Yarra, Victoria
- Original team: Ballarat
- Height: 174 cm (5 ft 9 in)
- Weight: 82 kg (181 lb)
- Position: Forward

Playing career^{1}
Years	Club	Games (Goals)
1907–10, 1912–13	St Kilda	93 (64)
- ^{1} Playing statistics correct to the end of 1913.

George Morrissey (1 January 1883 – 7 December 1964) was an Australian rules footballer who played with St Kilda in the Victorian Football League (VFL).

Morrissey, a forward, came to St Kilda from Ballarat and soon made a name of himself as a tough and aggressive player. In 1911 he joined Tasmanian club North Hobart and became their first ever official coach. He spent the season as a ruckman and represented Tasmania at the 1911 Adelaide Carnival.

In 1912 he returned to St Kilda and was appointed captain. His season ended in their round 16 clash against Fitzroy when he was reported for abusing an umpire and received a 10-game suspension which carried over into 1913. He lost the captaincy the following season but had a good year, kicking 22 goals, eight of them in the finals series. St Kilda made their inaugural Grand Final and he performed well with two goals in the loss.

He finished his career in Western Australia where he spent three seasons at East Perth.
