= Jimmy Freake =

Australian rules footballer

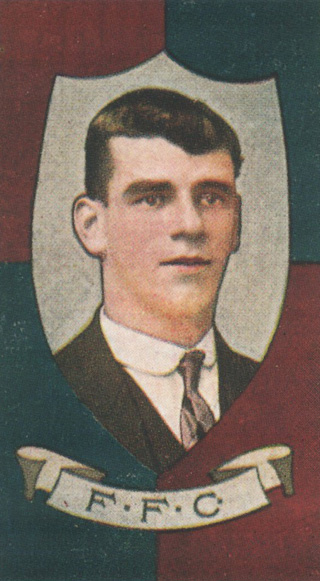

Personal information
- Full name: James Henry Freake
- Born: 27 January 1889; Collingwood, Victoria
- Died: 19 May 1937 (aged 48); Preston, Victoria
- Debut: 1912, Fitzroy vs. South Melbourne, at Lake Oval
- Height: 178 cm (5 ft 10 in)
- Weight: 63 kg (139 lb)

Playing career^{1}
Years	Club	Games (Goals)
1912–1924	Fitzroy	174 (442)

Coaching career
Years	Club	Games (W–L–D)
1929	Fitzroy	8 (1–7–0)
- ^{1} Playing statistics correct to the end of 1924.

Career highlights
- 2× VFL premierships: 1913, 1922; VFL leading goalkicker: 1915; Fitzroy Club Champion: 1918; 7× Fitzroy leading goalkicker: 1912, 1913, 1914, 1915, 1917, 1918, 1923

James Henry Freake (27 January 1889 – 19 May 1937) was an Australian rules footballer who played with Fitzroy in the Victorian Football League (VFL). A full forward, Freake lacked the height and weight that most had for that position but had considerable pace and ball handling abilities.

Freake was a member of two Fitzroy premiership sides, the first in 1913 and the other in 1922, when he kicked four goals in the Grand Final. He won the club's best and fairest award in 1918.

His career tally of 442 goals is the fourth most achieved by a Fitzroy player and was a club record when he retired in 1924. He also kicked the most goals ever for Fitzroy in finals football with 45. Other goalkicking feats include being the first Fitzroy player to kick 10 goals in a VFL match, topping their goalkicking seven times including a best of 66 goals in 1915 and twice being the leading goalkicker in a VFL season, in 1913 and 1915.

Freake died in Preston in 1937.
