= Teddy Buist =

Australian rules footballer

Personal information
- Full name: Edward John Buist
- Born: 4 May 1885; Fitzroy, Victoria
- Died: 30 June 1959 (aged 74); South Melbourne, Victoria
- Original team: Fitzroy Churches
- Height: 170 cm (5 ft 7 in)
- Weight: 63 kg (139 lb)

Playing career^{1}
Years	Club	Games (Goals)
1906–1907	South Melbourne	12 (0)
1911–1916	Fitzroy	59 (15)
1909-1910	Norwood	27 (22)
Total		98 (37)
- ^{1} Playing statistics correct to the end of 1916.

Teddy Buist (4 May 1885 – 30 June 1959) was an Australian rules footballer who played for South Melbourne and Fitzroy in the VFL.

Buist, a wingman, made his debut in 1906 with South Melbourne and spent two seasons with the club. He then played for Prahran in the Victorian Football Association (VFA), representing the VFA in a match against South Australia. Buist moved to Adelaide and played for South Australian National Football League (SANFL) club Norwood in 1909 and 1910. He returned to the VFL in 1911, joining Fitzroy with whom he would play in premiership teams in 1913 and 1916.
