= Roy Millen =

Australian rules footballer and field umpire

Personal information
- Full name: Roland Herbert Millen
- Born: 12 October 1893; Prahran, Victoria
- Died: 30 May 1946 (aged 52); Preston, Victoria
- Height: 173 cm (5 ft 8 in)
- Weight: 72 kg (159 lb)
- Position: Wingman

Playing career^{1}
Years	Club	Games (Goals)
1913–23	Fitzroy	117 (9)
- ^{1} Playing statistics correct to the end of 1923.

Roland Herbert 'Roy' Millen (12 October 1893 – 30 May 1946) was an Australian rules footballer who played for Fitzroy in the Victorian Football League (VFL).

Although primarily a wingman, Millen was also used as a centreman at times during his career. He was a member of Fitzroy's premiership team in 1917 and participated in their losing Grand Final the following season.

In the 1929 VFL season he officiated as a field umpire for one match.
