= Harry Greaves (footballer) =

Australian rules footballer

Personal information
- Full name: Henry John Greaves
- Born: 18 February 1895; Williamstown, Victoria
- Died: 5 April 1974 (aged 79); Prahran, Victoria
- Original team: Williamstown

Playing career^{1}
Years	Club	Games (Goals)
1913–14	Williamstown (VFA)	4 (1)
1916–17	Carlton	9 (0)
1919	Footscray (VFA)	19 (5)
- ^{1} Playing statistics correct to the end of 1919.

Harry Greaves (18 February 1895 – 5 April 1974) was an Australian rules footballer who played with Carlton in the Victorian Football League (VFL).
