= 1916 VFL season =

20th season of the Victorian Football League (VFL)

1916 VFL premiership season
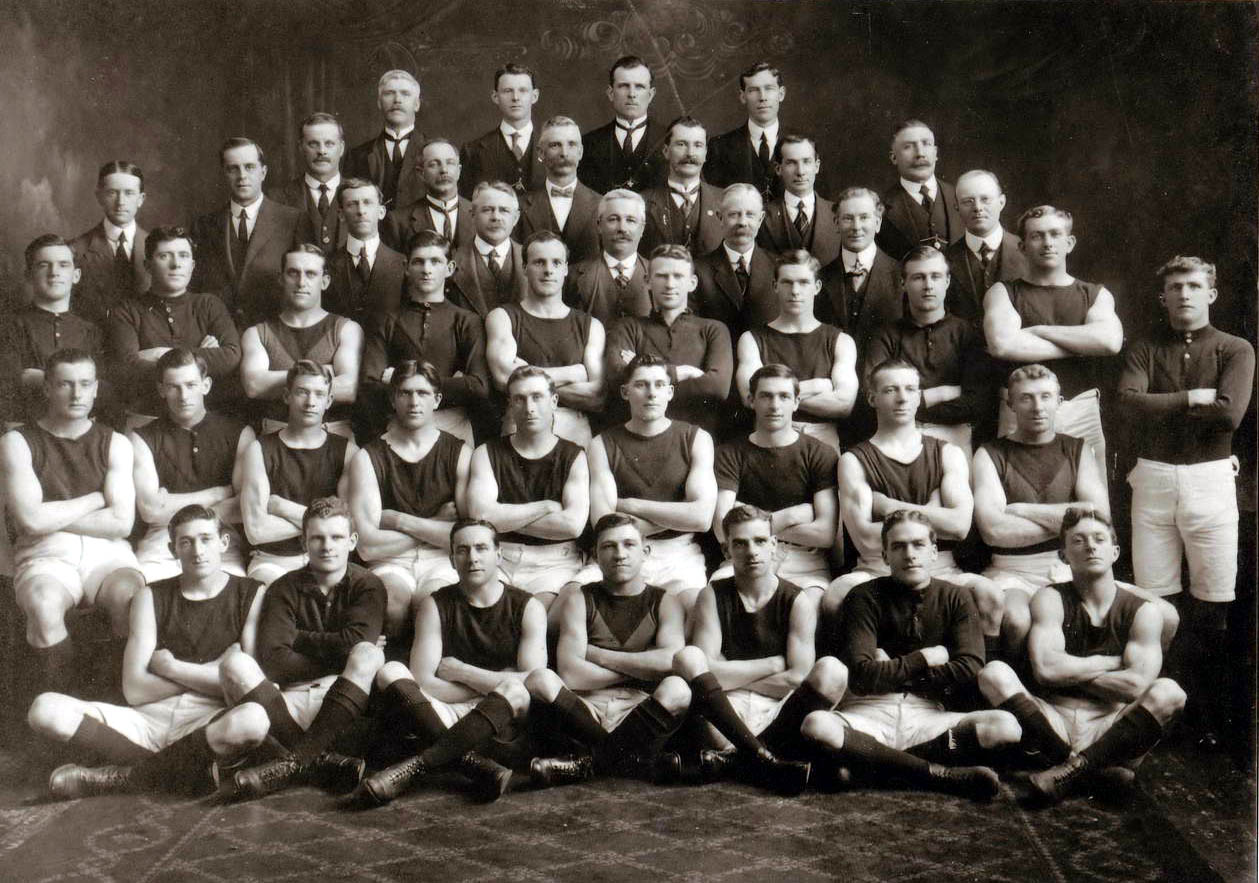
- Fitzroy 1916 VFL premiership team
- Date: 6 May – 2 September 1916
- Teams: 4
- Premiers: Fitzroy; 6th premiership
- Minor premiers: Carlton; 6th minor premiership
- Leading goalkicker medallist: Dick Lee (Collingwood); 46 goals
- Matches played: 28

The 1916 VFL season was the 20th season of the Victorian Football League (VFL), the highest-level senior Australian rules football competition in Victoria. Played during the peak of World War I, the season was the shortest in the league's history and featured the fewest clubs, with only four clubs – Carlton, Collingwood, Fitzroy and Richmond – featuring in 1916. The season ran from 6 May to 2 September, comprising a twelve-match home-and-away season followed by a four-week finals series featuring all four clubs.

Fitzroy won the premiership, its sixth VFL premiership; despite finishing in last place during the home-and-away season with a 2–9–1 win–loss–draw record, Fitzroy won all three of its finals, culminating in defeating Carlton by 29 points in the 1916 VFL grand final. Carlton won the minor premiership by finishing atop the home-and-away ladder with a 10–2 win–loss record. Collingwood's Dick Lee won his fifth leading goalkicker medal as the league's leading goalkicker.

== Background ==
=== Format ===
In 1916, the VFL competition consisted of four teams of 18 on-the-field players each, with no "reserves", although any of the 18 players who had left the playing field for any reason could later resume their place on the field at any time during the match. Each of the four teams played each other four times in a 12 match home-and-away season (each team hosting each of the others twice); once the 12 round home-and-away season had finished, the 1916 VFL Premiers were determined by the specific format and conventions of the amended Argus system.

=== Impact of the war ===
The situation of the VFL in 1916 was rather complex.

- By 1916, Australian society in general, and the VFL clubs (and their respective supporters) in particular, were collectively appalled that conflict (originally thought to be one of a few months' duration) had turned into a gigantic, worldwide war of never-before-seen dimensions, and were deeply shocked by the ever-increasing magnitude of the Australian casualty lists.
- At the same time, the apparent egalitarian tranquillity of Melbourne and its football world, was being increasingly polarised by an ever-widening series of divisive issues that arose as a consequence of the war, including:
  - Manhood issues, between those who saw war service as a logical extension of the physical and moral training embodied in football, and a manifestation of the unselfish chivalry and team spirit displayed by champion athletes, and those who did not.
    - In a series of 1917 editorials, The Age of Melbourne constantly observed that, in its view, at least 10 of every 15 VFL senior players were fit for overseas service, and that in the absence of their enlistment, The Age could only conclude that they were either unpatriotic or cowards.
    - This sort of sentiment was still strongly held by its advocates for many years. In 1919, with all nine clubs back in its competition, the VFL rejected a suggestion that the Football Record place a star next to the name of each returned serviceman on its players lists. It also rejected a suggestion that returned servicemen wear a special badge on the guernsey to indicate that they had also "played the greater game".
  - Class issues, between a middle class who predominantly saw preference for sporting activities over military service as a dereliction of "national duty", and a working class that felt it had already sacrificed far too much.
  - Secular issues, between the predominantly pro-British Australian Protestants and the predominantly pro-Irish Australian Roman Catholics (encouraged by the intensely anti-British, pro-Irish and Roman Catholic Archbishop of Melbourne, the Charleville, County Cork-born Daniel Mannix).
    - This significant division within the 1916 Melbourne population in general was further amplified by the fact that the memberships of certain clubs such as Essendon and Melbourne were almost exclusively affluent and Protestant, whilst those of Collingwood and Richmond were almost exclusively poor and Roman Catholic (Pascoe, 1996, p. 102).
  - Financial issues, between those who relied upon match fees to support themselves and their families, and those who did not.
    - In Sydney, the amateur, middle-class rugby union competition was suspended for 1915, 1916, 1917 and 1918, while the professional, working-class rugby league competition continued without major change.
  - Sporting issues between those who played football for the love of sport — often driven by the ideals of muscular Christianity — and those who played football only because they were paid to do so.
    - In 1915, Lawrence Adamson, the headmaster of Melbourne's Wesley College and the President of the Victorian Amateur Football Association (VAFA), drawing attention to the large number of VAFA players that had enlisted in the A.I.F compared with the small number of VFL players, had provocatively remarked that if the VFL was to continue to distract young men from "their duty", that the VFL premiership team of 1915 should be given Iron Crosses instead of the traditional medallion.
    - It is a matter of record that the VFA played no matches at all in 1916 and 1917. It is also a matter of record that the VAFA, a competition where all of players were amateurs, and paid the VAFA each week to play (the money went to pay for umpires’ fees, etc.), played no matches in 1916 to 1919; however the West Australian Football League (WAFL), where in practice all players were likewise amateur, continued play throughout the war.
    - The South Australian Football League (SAFL) played no matches in 1916, 1917, and 1918, whilst the Tasmanian Football League (TFL) played no matches in 1916, 1917, 1918 and 1919.
- All of these matters were further complicated by the even more intense community polarisation, involving all of the above dimensions plus the additional moral, ethical, gender, and social issues (and the various individual political allegiances) involved in the vociferous debate over the merits and demerits of the two unsuccessful attempts made by the Australian Government (on 28 October 1916 and 20 December 1917) to impose compulsory military service on young Australian men (see Conscription in Australia).
- On 17 February 1916, a meeting of Essendon players made the following resolution, stating that these were the only conditions under which they would play in 1916: "That all players play as amateurs. That all gate receipts and membership subscriptions be pooled and held in trust by the League and at the end of the season, be handed over to the Patriotic Funds." The Essendon committee said it would support the players, and would find the money to cover whatever expenses were necessary to keep the team on the field. The VFL rejected the players' demands, and Essendon did not compete in 1916. Essendon did not compete in 1917 either because the VFL, once again, rejected to accept the players' demands.
- In addition to Essendon, Geelong, Melbourne, South Melbourne and St Kilda all refused to play in the VFL competition in 1916 on "patriotic grounds", leaving only the four inner-suburban teams of Carlton, Collingwood, Fitzroy, and Richmond (the home grounds of which were all within walking distance of each other).
- Carlton, Collingwood, Fitzroy, and Richmond had each volunteered to devote a significant proportion of their 1916 gate receipts to what were known as Patriotic Funds and also conduct a number of special fundraising activities; however, in June 1917, an audit by the VFL of the money that each club's "patriotic fundraising" had delivered over to the State War Council disclosed that the four clubs, which had appeared to all and sundry to be suffering considerable financial distress during the 1916 season due to the reduction in gate receipts, etc., had apparently discovered that their fundraising had involved an extraordinarily large amount of "expenses". From its recorded "patriotic fundraising" receipts of £918 (equivalent to $104,685 in 2022), Fitzroy could only deliver £152 (equivalent to $17,333 in 2022) after "expenses"; Collingwood, £40 (equivalent to $4,561 in 2022) from £664 (equivalent to $75,720 in 2022); Richmond, £90 (equivalent to $10,263 in 2022) from £614 (equivalent to $70,018 in 2022); and Carlton, nothing at all from £884 (equivalent to $100,808 in 2022). The State War Council censured the clubs, and appointed its own supervisors to oversee the clubs' fundraising in 1917.

=== District football ===
Although the 1916 season itself was disrupted by the war, it was the first season to come under the VFL's new district football scheme. Under the new scheme:

- Metropolitan Melbourne was divided into nine districts, and players would be required to play for the club which represented the district in which he resided.
- To switch clubs by changing his place of residence, a player would need to reside in his new club's district for:
  - 13 weeks, with a clearance from his club and a permit from the league
  - 36 months without a clearance from his club
- Country players in unallocated districts could choose to play for any club, but would remain tied to that club once the initial permit was granted
- Players from the Ballarat and Bendigo leagues and the Victorian Football Association also required a clearance from their current club to move to a VFL club.
- The rule was grandfathered to allow current players to remain at their clubs regardless of residential qualification

The scheme had been developed by a league sub-committee over the previous two years (and had originally allowed for players to qualify for University based on past or present enrolment at the University of Melbourne and affiliated academic bodies), and the final approval for the scheme came in October 1915. District/zone recruiting remained in place from 1916 until 1991.

== Home-and-away season ==
=== Round 1 ===
Home team	Home team score	Away team	Away team score	Venue	Date
Carlton	7.18 (60)	Fitzroy	9.10 (64)	Princes Park	6 May 1916
Richmond	10.9 (69)	Collingwood	11.11 (77)	Punt Road Oval	6 May 1916

=== Round 2 ===
Home team	Home team score	Away team	Away team score	Venue	Date
Fitzroy	9.12 (66)	Richmond	5.7 (37)	Brunswick Street Oval	13 May 1916
Collingwood	7.3 (45)	Carlton	10.11 (71)	Victoria Park	13 May 1916

=== Round 3 ===
Home team	Home team score	Away team	Away team score	Venue	Date
Fitzroy	7.8 (50)	Collingwood	6.14 (50)	Brunswick Street Oval	20 May 1916
Richmond	7.19 (61)	Carlton	9.12 (66)	Punt Road Oval	20 May 1916

=== Round 4 ===
Home team	Home team score	Away team	Away team score	Venue	Date
Collingwood	10.18 (78)	Richmond	7.11 (53)	Victoria Park	27 May 1916
Fitzroy	7.9 (51)	Carlton	13.6 (84)	Brunswick Street Oval	27 May 1916

=== Round 5 ===
Home team	Home team score	Away team	Away team score	Venue	Date
Carlton	10.15 (75)	Collingwood	11.10 (76)	Princes Park	3 June 1916
Richmond	19.13 (127)	Fitzroy	9.14 (68)	Punt Road Oval	3 June 1916

=== Round 6 ===
Home team	Home team score	Away team	Away team score	Venue	Date
Collingwood	11.13 (79)	Fitzroy	8.17 (65)	Victoria Park	10 June 1916
Carlton	14.8 (92)	Richmond	3.13 (31)	Princes Park	10 June 1916

=== Round 7 ===
Home team	Home team score	Away team	Away team score	Venue	Date
Collingwood	10.14 (74)	Richmond	11.9 (75)	Victoria Park	17 June 1916
Fitzroy	7.8 (50)	Carlton	10.19 (79)	Brunswick Street Oval	17 June 1916

=== Round 8 ===
Home team	Home team score	Away team	Away team score	Venue	Date
Carlton	9.11 (65)	Collingwood	7.11 (53)	Princes Park	24 June 1916
Richmond	9.11 (65)	Fitzroy	7.13 (55)	Punt Road Oval	24 June 1916

=== Round 9 ===
Home team	Home team score	Away team	Away team score	Venue	Date
Collingwood	8.11 (59)	Fitzroy	8.10 (58)	Victoria Park	8 July 1916
Carlton	12.19 (91)	Richmond	6.5 (41)	Princes Park	8 July 1916

=== Round 10 ===
Home team	Home team score	Away team	Away team score	Venue	Date
Carlton	11.15 (81)	Fitzroy	8.14 (62)	Princes Park	15 July 1916
Richmond	14.9 (93)	Collingwood	9.13 (67)	Punt Road Oval	15 July 1916

=== Round 11 ===
Home team	Home team score	Away team	Away team score	Venue	Date
Fitzroy	9.11 (65)	Richmond	10.15 (75)	Brunswick Street Oval	22 July 1916
Collingwood	10.10 (70)	Carlton	9.18 (72)	Victoria Park	22 July 1916

=== Round 12 ===
Home team	Home team score	Away team	Away team score	Venue	Date
Fitzroy	8.9 (57)	Collingwood	11.9 (75)	Brunswick Street Oval	29 July 1916
Richmond	9.11 (65)	Carlton	12.10 (82)	Punt Road Oval	29 July 1916

== Ladder ==
(P)	Premiers

#	Team	P	W	L	D	PF	PA	%	Pts
1	Carlton	12	10	2	0	918	669	137.2	40
2	Collingwood	12	6	5	1	803	803	100.0	26
3	Richmond	12	5	7	0	792	881	89.9	20
4	Fitzroy (P)	12	2	9	1	711	871	81.6	10

Rules for classification: 1. premiership points; 2. percentage; 3. points for
Average score: 67.2
Source: AFL Tables

== Finals series ==
=== Semi-finals ===
Home team	Home team score	Away team	Away team score	Venue	Date	Attendance
Collingwood	8.9 (57)	Fitzroy	9.9 (63)	MCG	12 August 1916	9,690
Carlton	10.15 (75)	Richmond	10.12 (72)	MCG	19 August 1916	11,728

=== Preliminary final ===
Home team	Home team score	Away team	Away team score	Venue	Date	Attendance
Carlton	5.12 (42)	Fitzroy	9.11 (65)	MCG	26 August 1916	15,567

=== Grand final ===
Home team	Home team score	Away team	Away team score	Venue	Date	Attendance
Carlton	8.8 (56)	Fitzroy	12.13 (85)	MCG	2 September 1916	21,130

== Season notes ==
- Fitzroy finished last at the end of the home-and-away season, and Richmond finished last overall based on finals results. While it is often said that Fitzroy won both the "wooden spoon" and the premiership in the 1916 season, Richmond is the officially recognised wooden spooner, according to both the official AFL Season Guide and the Football Record.

== Awards ==
- The 1916 VFL Premiership team was Fitzroy.
- The VFL's leading goalkicker was Dick Lee of Collingwood with 48 goals.

== See also ==
- 1916 Pioneer Exhibition Game

== Sources ==
- 1916 VFL season at AFL Tables
- 1916 VFL season at Australian Football
