= Thomas Heaney =

Australian rules footballer (1888–1928)

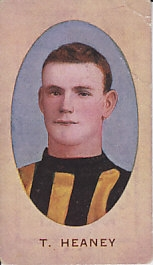
- Cigarette card of Heaney in 1910

Personal information
- Full name: Thomas Francis Heaney
- Born: 2 April 1888; Collingwood, Victoria
- Died: 17 August 1928 (aged 40); Cheltenham, Victoria
- Original team: Richmond (VFA)
- Height: 178 cm (5 ft 10 in)
- Weight: 86 kg (190 lb)

Playing career^{1}
Years	Club	Games (Goals)
1908–1913	Richmond	56 (37)
1913–1921	Fitzroy	98 (95)
Total		154 (132)
- ^{1} Playing statistics correct to the end of 1921.

Career highlights
- Fitzroy premiership player: 1913 & 1916; Fitzroy leading goalkicker: 1916

Thomas Heaney (2 April 1888 – 17 August 1928) was an Australian rules footballer who played in the VFA between 1906 and 1907 then in the VFL from 1908 until 1913 for the Richmond Football Club. He played for the Fitzroy Football Club between 1913 and 1917 and then again between 1919 and 1921. Finally he played three games for the Port Melbourne Football Club back in the VFA in 1922.

== Death ==
Heaney died from illness, on 17 August 1928, aged 40.
