= Wally Johnson (footballer) =

Australian rules footballer

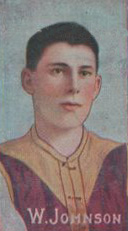

Personal information
- Full name: Walter Simon Johnson
- Born: 1 September 1887; Collingwood, Victoria
- Died: 9 October 1962 (aged 75); Parkville, Victoria
- Original team: Abbotsford
- Height: 183 cm (6 ft 0 in)
- Weight: 83 kg (183 lb)
- Position: Centre half back

Playing career^{1}
Years	Club	Games (Goals)
1907–1916	Fitzroy	175 (83)
1919	Fitzroy	15 (0)
Total		190 (83)

Representative team honours^{2}
Years	Team	Games (Goals)
1914	Victoria	2 (0)
- ^{1} Playing statistics correct to the end of 1919.^{2} Representative statistics correct as of 1914.

Career highlights
- 2× VFL premierships: 1913, 1916; Fitzroy captain 1916, 1919; Fitzroy Club Champion: 1907; Fitzroy leading goalkicker: 1908

Walter Simon Johnson (1 September 1887 – 9 October 1962) was an Australian rules footballer who played with Fitzroy in the Victorian Football League (VFL).

== Family ==
The son of Thomas Henry Johnson (1866-1915), and Eliza Caroline Johnson (1863-1949), née Thomas, Walter Simon Johnson was born in Collingwood on 1 September 1887.

== Football ==
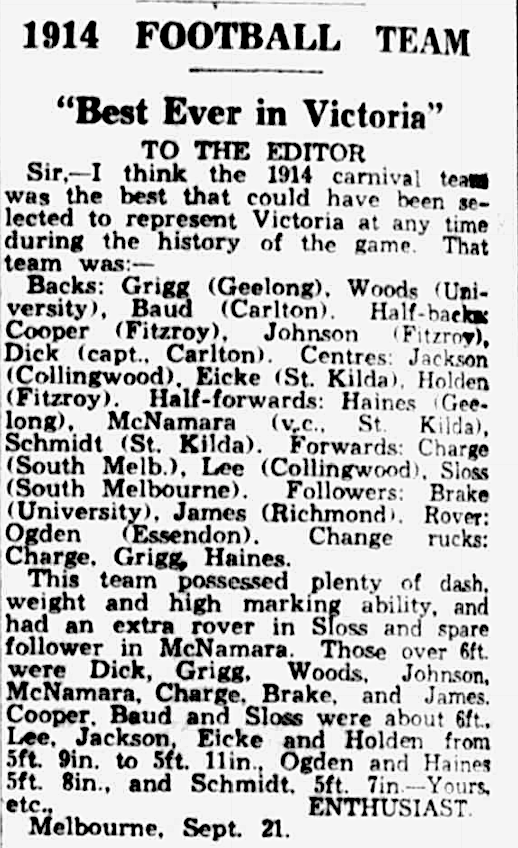
Enthusiast's Letter to the Editor The Herald, 21 September 1934.

Having initially tried to play with Collingwood, Johnson made his debut for Fitzroy in 1907 and finished the year as the club's joint best and fairest winner. He played most of his career at half back but played up forward for his first three seasons, topping Fitzroy's goal-kicking in 1908 with 27 goals.

A member of their premiership side in 1913, the following season Johnson represented Victoria at the Sydney Carnival. In 1916 he was appointed club captain and led the side to the premiership, defeating Carlton in the grand final. Fitzroy had actually finished the home and away season in last position; but, because of the war, only four teams were competing, and all qualified for the semi-finals.

For the next two years Johnson lived in the United Kingdom, where he worked in a munitions factory, before returning to Australia for one last season in 1919.

After retiring as a Fitzroy player, he was appointed captain-coach of the Ballarat Imperial Football Club in 1924. He retired before the 1926 season commenced and took up umpiring.

== Death ==
He died at Parkville, Victoria on 9 October 1962.

== See also ==
- 1914 Sydney Carnival
