= George Holden (Australian rules footballer) =

Australian rules footballer and coach

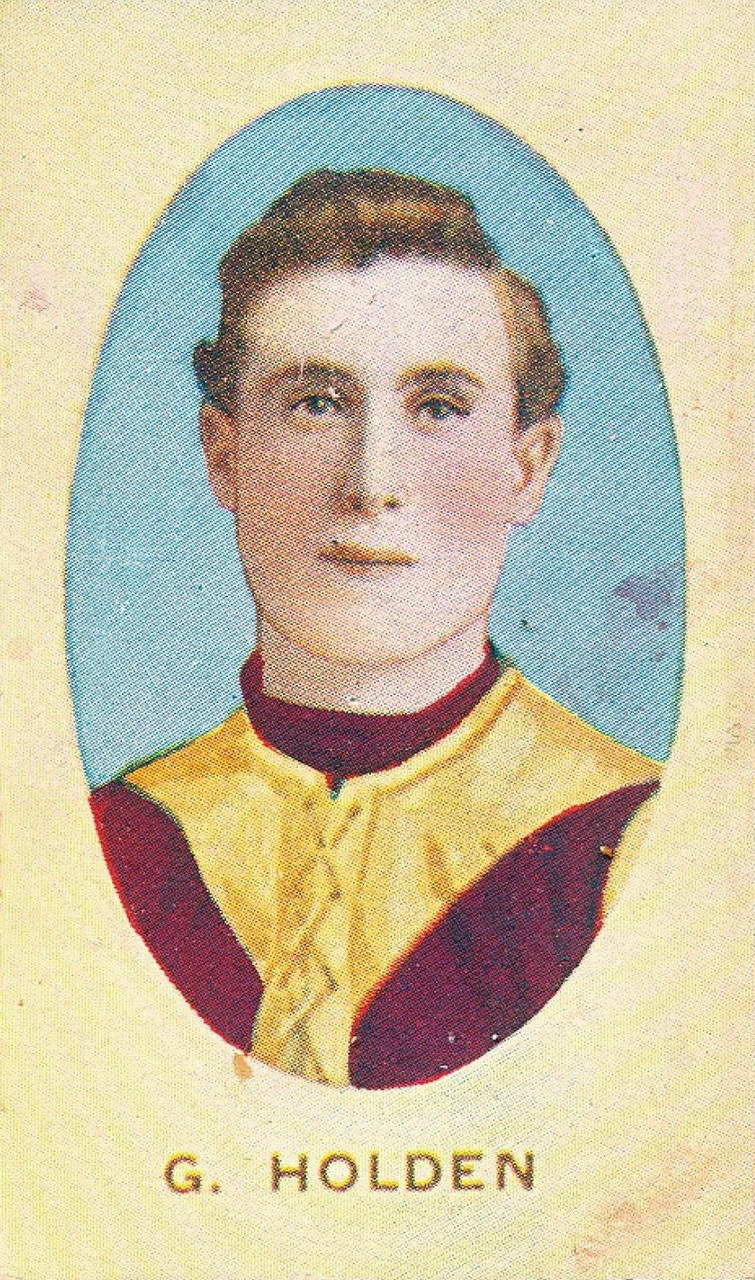
- Cigarette card of Holden in 1910

Personal information
- Full name: George Hugh Holden
- Born: 15 April 1889; Fitzroy North, Victoria
- Died: 21 July 1959 (aged 70); Forest Hill, Victoria
- Original team: West Melbourne (VFA)
- Height: 173 cm (5 ft 8 in)
- Weight: 70 kg (154 lb)
- Position: Midfielder

Playing career^{1}
Years	Club	Games (Goals)
1907	West Melbourne (VFA)	2 (0)
1908–1919	Fitzroy (VFL)	164 (37)

Representative team honours^{2}
Years	Team	Games (Goals)
1911, 1914	Victoria	5 (2)

Coaching career^{3}
Years	Club	Games (W–L–D)
1916–1919	Fitzroy	54 (24–28–2)
- ^{1} Playing statistics correct to the end of 1919.^{2} Representative statistics correct as of 1914.^{3} Coaching statistics correct as of 1919.

Career highlights
- 2× VFL premierships: 1913, 1916; Fitzroy captain: 1917–1918; 2× Fitzroy Club Champion: 1908, 1915

George Hugh Holden (15 April 1889 – 21 July 1959) was an Australian rules footballer who played for the West Melbourne Football Club in the Victorian Football Association (VFA) and the Fitzroy in the Victorian Football League (VFL).

== Family ==
The son of William Fullerton Holden (1860–1917), and Christina Braud Holden (1867–1949), née Balfour, George Hugh Holden was born at Fitzroy North, Victoria on 15 April 1889.

He married Olive Myrtle Browne (1887–1945) in 1915. They had one child, a daughter.

== Football ==
=== West Melbourne (VFA) ===
He played in the last two matches of the 1907 VFA season for West Melbourne: the Semi Final, against Richmond, on 21 September 1907, and the Grand Final, against Williamstown, on 28 September 1907,

=== Fitzroy (VFL) ===
Recruited from West Melbourne, Holden was both a centreman and wingman during his career with Fitzroy, which began in 1908. He was club champion in his debut season, winning the best and fairest award for the second time in 1915.

One of Fitzroy's best in their 1913 Grand Final win over St Kilda, Holden was named as the club's coach in 1916, and was also a premiership player, against Carlton, in 1916, his first year as coach.

Continuing as Fitzroy's coach, he was also the team's captain in 1917, and in 1918; but had to retire at the start of the 1919 season after suffering a serious thigh injury in the match against Carlton, at Princes Park, on 3 May 1919.

== Death ==
He died at his residence in Forest Hill, Victoria on 21 July 1959.

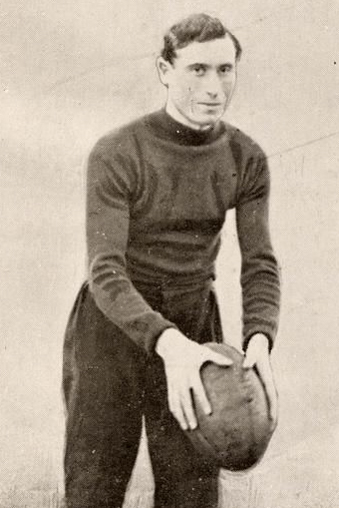
George Holden (1910).

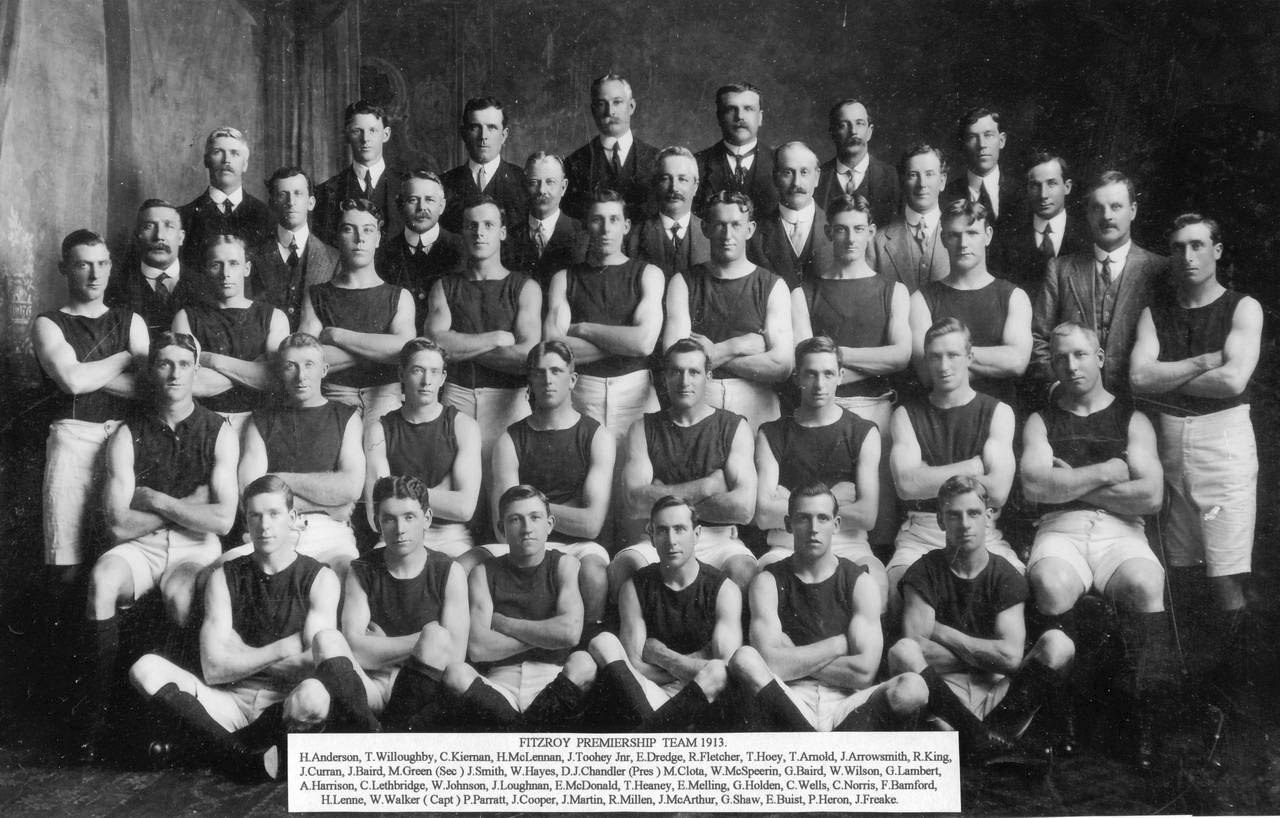
Fitzroy Football Team (1913)
Holden is standing, at far right.

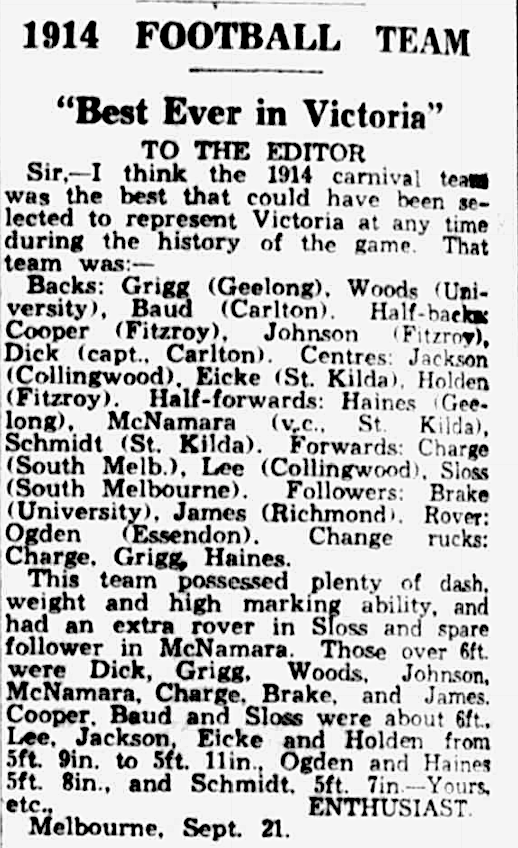
Enthusiast's Letter to the Editor
The Herald, 21 Sept. 1934.
