= Proposed mergers and relocations of the Fitzroy Football Club =

Australian rules football club in the 1990s

The Fitzroy Football Club is an Australian rules football club based in the inner-Melbourne suburb of Fitzroy North. The club's professional senior team was a foundation member of the Victorian Football League (now the Australian Football League) along with seven other clubs on its inception season of 1897. From the late 1960s onward, the club suffered from stadium constraints and financial difficulties, that resulted in multiple merger and relocation proposals.

With mounting financial pressure from creditors, the 1996 season would be Fitzroy's last season in the AFL. The club's AFL assets were taken over by the ten-year-old Brisbane Bears Football Club who then changed their name at the end of 1996 and as a condition of that deal, on November 1, 1996, Brisbane Bears members voted to change their club's name to the Brisbane Bears-Fitzroy Football Club (BBFFC or Brisbane Lions). There were as many as seven merger proposals, and two separate discussions of permanent relocation as a stand-alone entity. Despite the AFL operations being taken over by Brisbane, Fitzroy Football Club remained in Melbourne.

== Confirmed negotiations and speculations ==
=== Sydney Lions (1980) ===
A plan for Fitzroy to relocate to Sydney had its beginnings in Easter 1979, when Fitzroy president Frank Bibby and Graeme Plum (Fitzroy committeeman 1979-1983) were invited by Kevin Humphries, president of the NSW Rugby League, to the Sydney Cricket Ground, for the 'Rugby League Marathon'. During the game Bibby and Plum concluded that there was a great opportunity for Australian football in Sydney and that Fitzroy should be a part of that. The club carried out a series of fact finding work, including lining up a deal with a licensed Australian rules club in North Sydney to act as a social club, finding sponsors and even lining up a bank to assist with finances, if they were given significant representation on the board. The promising initial findings encouraged some of those on the Fitzroy committee to consider a move was worthy of more investigation. In July 1980, President Frank Bibby stated publicly that Fitzroy was effectively bankrupt. The Club was $300,000 in debt and the deficit was expected to be $400,000 by the end of the VFL season in September. On 15 July, the Club defaulted on a cheque for $17,500 to the Australian Taxation Office, wages cheques were expected to be dishonoured that week; creditor could not be paid; an annual repayment of a major loan was six months overdue; a taxi company threatened the previous week to stop servicing the Club unless there was a significant payment on an outstanding account, and overdue maintenance work continued to force staff to work in sub-standard accommodation. Bibby proposed that Fitzroy relocate to Sydney. Fitzroy's solicitor David Cotter registered the name "Sydney Lions." The guernsey of the new Sydney Lions would have been the existing Fitzroy guernsey with the 'FFC' monogram replaced by a 'SFC' monogram.

At the time Fitzroy Football Club was not incorporated (this would occur in 1981) and any significant move such as relocation needed the approval of members at an extraordinary meeting. Fitzroy held a series of these at the Fitzroy Town Hall. Finally at the end of the season, a fund raising campaign was attended by 1200 supporters at the Camberwell Civic Centre, the relocation was finally put to rest, with an announcement that Fitzroy would not be relocating to Sydney made on 19 August 1980. Three weeks later Frank Bibby announced his resignation from the Fitzroy presidency, after five years in office.

Fitzroy enjoyed modest success following Frank Bibby's resignation, finishing fourth in 1981 and 1983 and fifth in 1984. However the Lions were unable to develop their existing home ground - the Junction Oval - because of financial constraints. On field success did not translate into increased membership and revenue with Fitzroy eventually moving to play home games at Victoria Park in 1985, five years after the shift to Sydney was first mooted.

=== Relocation and merger proposals of 1986 ===
While the AFL operations of Fitzroy Lions were eventually taken over by the Brisbane Bears in a deal with Fitzroy's administrator at the time in 1996, ten years earlier there were proposals to relocate Fitzroy to Brisbane. During the 1986 season, Fitzroy was more than one million dollars in debt and few thought the club would survive to the following year; during the season, two private consortiums made bids to take control of the club and relocate it to Brisbane, a third consortium proposed to move the club to Canberra, and the club also investigated mergers with Melbourne, St Kilda and Richmond during the year – but the Brisbane proposal was considered the strongest. Fitzroy's players, after training at Wesley College one Sunday morning late in the 1986 season were told of the proposal to relocate to Brisbane; knowing that Fitzroy were in desperate financial trouble, they voted almost unanimously in favour of the shift. However a saviour was found when Fitzroy-based company Hecron Ltd announced a bid to buy the club and keep it in Melbourne; the VFL Board of Management rejected the Hecron purchase by a large 10–2 majority, but the company still sponsored the club, and the club was able to stay in Melbourne for another ten years.

=== Melbourne Lions (1986, 1994) ===
The Melbourne Lions was to have been a new club made up from the merger of the Melbourne Football Club and the Fitzroy Football Club. The merger would have taken place at the end of 1986 and the club would have debuted in 1987. The jumper of the new team was essentially the traditional red and blue Melbourne jumper with a gold band separating the two colours, the gold Fitzroy lion logo featured on the front and a gold number on the back. Most of the merger details had been worked out in negotiations by both boards. It was established that Fitzroy chairman Leon Weigard and Melbourne president Stuart Spencer would share presidential duties, while the committee would be an even split of the current Fitzroy and Melbourne boards. The proposed merger was within a couple of days of being put to the members of Melbourne and Fitzroy for voting. However Fitzroy president Leon Weigard asked for more time in the hope that he could raise a substantial amount of money in the hope of keeping the Fitzroy Football Club as an independent entity in the then VFL (now AFL). Melbourne president Stuart Spencer then discontinued talks and the proposed merger was off.

Melbourne and Fitzroy again discussed a merger in 1994. This time Melbourne president Ian Ridley and Fitzroy chairman Dyson Hore-Lacy conducted talks. These talks began in late July 1994 at the city offices of Noel McMahen (Melbourne's vice president). While many of the merger details were the same as in 1986, a major sticking point was Dyson Hore-Lacy's insistence that "Fitzroy" remain part of any merged club's name; for example the "Melbourne - Fitzroy Football Club". However an in-principle' tentative agreement was reached that a company called the "Melbourne Football Club - Fitzroy Football Club Pty Ltd", operating as the "Melbourne Lions" would operate in the AFL for the 1995 season.

On Thursday 4 August 1994, Dyson Hore-Lacy met with Geoff Lord the President of the Hawthorn Football Club and John Lauritz, Hawthorn's Chief Executive Officer to discuss the possibility of a merger between Fitzroy and Hawthorn where a new club would be formed known as the "Hawthorn Lions." However, as Fitzroy had a tentative in principle agreement with the Melbourne Football Club to merge, the proposed merger with Hawthorn was rejected.

On Friday 5 August 1994, representatives of Melbourne and Fitzroy met the AFL commission who were supportive of the idea for Fitzroy and Melbourne to merge. Later that day Dyson Hore-Lacy met with Ron Casey, Peter de Rauch and Ken Montogomery of North Melbourne and informed them they were committed to merging with Melbourne. North Melbourne was informed that Fitzroy would be interested in talking to North Melbourne if the proposed merge with Melbourne did not work out.

The Melbourne board decided that not only was the name a problem, but the benefits of a merger with Fitzroy were limited. Like Melbourne, Fitzroy lacked a permanent training venue and had limited resources to make any new club, a strong powerful entity.

=== Fitzroy Bulldogs (1989) ===
The Fitzroy Bulldogs was to have been a team made up from the merger of the Footscray Football Club and the Fitzroy Football Club. The merger was announced in October 1989, and the club was approved by the VFL to debut in 1990. The VFL agreeing to clear both Fitzroy's and Footscray's debts as part of the merger, and allow the new club to begin debt-free. The merger was driven by immediate financial difficulties suffered by Footscray, but the merger collapsed when Footscray supporters secured sufficient money and sponsors to save their club from extinction.

=== Hobart Lions (1995) ===
In 1995 the Tasmanian government wanted Fitzroy to relocate in Tasmania.

=== North Fitzroy Kangaroos Football Club (1996) ===
The North Fitzroy Kangaroos Football Club was to have been a team made up from the merger of the North Melbourne Football Club and the Fitzroy Football Club. The merger would have taken place in 1996 and the club would have debuted in 1997, but the merger didn't eventuate as Fitzroy was placed in administration during the 1996 season and the administrator accepted an offer from the Brisbane Bears. North Melbourne continues to play in the AFL in its original state.

Timeline of the merger negotiations between Fitzroy and North Melbourne

- 6 March 1996 – Fitzroy board authorises board members Dyson Hore-Lacy, Elaine Findlay and Robert Johnstone to enter non-binding merger agreements with other AFL clubs.
- 6 May 1996 – Fitzroy and North Melbourne hold first merger talks.
- 11 May 1996 – A non-binding agreement to merge and the basic terms of name is struck between Fitzroy and North Melbourne. A Heads of Agreement document detailing the conditions of the merge in writing is signed.
- 13 May 1996 – A Brisbane offer is formally rejected by the Fitzroy board.
- 20 May 1996 – First Fitzroy shareholders' meeting to explain the conditions of a North Melbourne – Fitzroy merge.
- 28 May 1996 – Second Fitzroy shareholders' meeting.
- 14 June 1996 – First draft document of the merger was completed.
- 18 June 1996 – A meeting between North and Fitzroy to execute the merger document canceled. Greg Miller, North Melbourne's Chief Executive Officer (CEO) tells Dyson Hore-Lacy that North Melbourne wanted to change the name of the merged club from the already agreed 'Fitzroy-North Melbourne Kangaroos' to 'North Melbourne-Fitzroy Kangaroos'.
- 20 June 1996 – The Fitzroy board rejects North Melbourne's revised conditions.
- 24 June 1996 – The Brisbane Bears are contacted by Fitzroy and advised to submit their best offer to Fitzroy for consideration.
- 25 June 1996 – A compromise between North Melbourne and Fitzroy is reached.
- 26 June 1996 – Fitzroy Football Club offers $550,000 plus $100,000 to be paid over the next two years to their only secured creditor the Nauru Insurance Company to settle their debt. This offer is rejected. Nauru wanted $750,000 by the end of August and $100,000 for the next three years to consider their debt settled.
- 27 June 1996 – Nauru Insurance Company agrees to $750,000 by the end of August and $100,000 for the next two years and $50,000 for the third. North Melbourne board member and one of the chief merger negotiator Peter de Rauch says North Melbourne will not allow any more than $550,000 to be paid.
- 28 June 1996 – Nauru Insurance Company appoints an administrator (Michael Brennan) to recover their debt.
- 29 June 1996 – Fitzroy negotiates with Nauru to pay $550,000 by August 1996, $150,000 in 1997 and $100,000 in 1998. Peter de Rauch agrees to put that proposal to the North Melbourne board on Monday 1 July.
- 1 July 1996 – The Fitzroy board agrees to underwrite all monies owed to Nauru over the sum of $550,000. The AFL commission gives Fitzroy and North Melbourne until Friday 5 July to complete their merger.
- 2 July 1996 – North Melbourne's Greg Miller informs Dyson Hore-Lacy that North Melbourne now wants only four Fitzroy board members on the board of the merged club. Fitzroy refuses to accept that condition.
- 3 July 1996 – North Melbourne backs down on their demand of 2 July, but still wanted none of the current Fitzroy directors on the board. North Melbourne was asked by Dyson Hore-Lacy to give an undertaking to Fitzroy that there would be no more changes to the agreement of 25 June. No such undertaking was given.
- 3 July 1996 – Nauru Insurance Company accepts $550,000 paid before 31 August, $350,000 paid before 31 October 1997 and the rest of the balance payable in $50,000 payments annually from 1998 onwards.
- 3 July 1996 – The Fitzroy board re-opens discussions with the Brisbane Bears. The Bears are told that the door with Fitzroy is "open half an inch"
- 3 July 1996 – Greg Miller the CEO of North Melbourne informs the media that without 54 players on their 1997 list there would be no merger with Fitzroy.
- 4 July 1996 – Fitzroy is informed by the AFL that the merger would be rejected by the other AFL clubs if North Melbourne continued to demand 54 players. Dyson Hore-Lacy informs North Melbourne's Ken Montgomery and Greg Miller of this fact.
- 4 July 1996 – Fitzroy settles last niggling disputes in their proposed merger agreement with North Melbourne and signs a formal document setting out the merger in fine detail, which includes the new agreed name of the club to be the 'North Fitzroy Kangaroos Football Club'. The merger agreement is set to be signed by the AFL on Friday morning (5 July) subject to the AFL clubs' endorsement.
- 4 July 1996 – AFL Presidents' Meeting rejects the Fitzroy-North Melbourne merger. After a meeting between the administrator of Fitzroy and the AFL commission, the AFL commission recommends a Bears-Fitzroy deal. North Melbourne withdraws.

=== Brisbane Lions (1996) ===
- 4 July 1996 – A reconvened AFL presidents' meeting endorses the AFL commission's recommendation of a Brisbane Bears-Fitzroy deal.

== Fitzroy today ==
Fitzroy Football Club was completely gutted by the administrator at the end of 1996, leaving a club that temporarily only had a board of directors and shareholders. For two years, the Brisbane Lions held the registered charge over Fitzroy Football Club's head threatening to liquidate the club until in 1999 Lions board member Allan Piper had the charge removed. From that point onwards, Fitzroy Football Club started re-accumulating assets, trademarking the FFC logo, launching a "Fitzroy Shop", which sold Fitzroy jumpers and other merchandise, issuing club memberships to supporters, and slowly getting back on its feet as an operating football club.

In 1999-2000, the Fitzroy Football Club sponsored the Coburg Football Club in the VFL who temporarily renamed themselves the Coburg-Fitzroy Lions. Bill Atherton and John Guest, to whom the latter Guest has strong historical family ties to the North Melbourne Football Club, were both lifelong fans of Fitzroy. They joined the board as directors of the Coburg Football Club trading as Coburg-Fitzroy Lions in 1999-2000 to advance the Fitzroy's partnership with Coburg. This arrangement ended for the 2001 season when under the AFL-VFL alignment system, Coburg aligned with the Richmond Football Club to become known as the Coburg Tigers.

Meanwhile, in the wake of Fitzroy leaving the AFL and having temporarily no football operations, the University Reds sought to fill some of the void (and thereby gaining more support) by renaming themselves the 'Fitzroy Reds', adopting (with the Fitzroy Football Club's blessing and sponsorship) the Fitzroy jumper and playing out of Fitzroy Football Club's traditional home, the Brunswick Street Oval.

However, as Fitzroy Football Club further increased its assets and profile it was felt that two separate football clubs called 'Fitzroy' wasn't the most efficient way to rebuild Fitzroy's profile in the Victorian footballing community. In December 2008 the Fitzroy Reds terminated its membership of the VAFA, transferred all its assets to the Fitzroy Football Club and ceased to exist as an entity. In return the Fitzroy Football Club (by special dispensation from the VAFA), took the Fitzroy Reds' place in the VAFA competition. Also the Fitzroy Football Club agreed to add "incorporating the Fitzroy Reds" to their logo and name. This was done with the full support of the Brisbane Lions.

Today the club fields amateur and semi professional teams in the Victorian Amateur Football Association, Victorian Women's Football League and various other junior leagues respectively.

After a bumpy start, relations between the Lions and Fitzroy are strong, with a one club approach being taken by both parties. The Lions sponsor a male and female Fitzroy player per season, have the Fitzroy juniors form guards of honour at Melbourne games, and both take pride in a rich history stretching back to 1883.
