= 1964 Brownlow Medal =

- Winner: Gordon Collis (Carlton); 27 votes

Television/radio coverage
- Network: Seven Network

The 1964 Brownlow Medal was the 37th presentation of this award, given to the player adjudged the fairest and best player during the Victorian Football League (VFL) home and away season. Gordon Collis from the Carlton Football Club won the medal by polling twenty-seven votes during the 1964 VFL season.

== Leading votegetters ==
| | Player | Votes |
|---|---|---|
| 1st | Gordon Collis (Carlton) | 27 |
| =2nd | Ken Fraser (Essendon) | 19 |
| =2nd | Phil Hay (Hawthorn) | 19 |
| =4th | Max Urquhart (Collingwood) | 16 |
| =4th | John Schultz (Footscray) | 16 |
| 6th | Ian Stewart (St Kilda) | 14 |
| 7th | Kevin Murray (Fitzroy) | 13 |
| =8th | Laurie Hill (Collingwood) | 11 |
| =8th | Bill Goggin (Geelong) | 11 |
| =8th | Hassa Mann (Melbourne) | 11 |
| =8th | Bob Skilton (South Melbourne) | 11 |
| =8th | Jim Wallis (St Kilda) | 11 |
