= Darren Holmes =

Darren Holmes may refer to:

- Darren Holmes (baseball) (born 1966), Major League Baseball pitcher
- Darren Holmes (footballer) (born 1970), Australian rules footballer
- Darren T. Holmes, American film editor
