= Lavington Football Club =

Australian rules football and netball club

Lavington Panthers

Names
- Full name: Lavington Panthers Football & Netball Club
- Nickname: Panthers

Club details
- Colours
- Competition: Ovens & Murray Football League
- President: Peter Barwick
- Coach: Adam Schneider
- Premierships: (11): 1922, 1924, 1938, 1965, 1966, 1971, 1983, 1986, 2001, 2005, 2019
- Ground: Lavington Sports Ground

Uniforms
Home

Other information
- Official website: Lavington Panthers FNC

The Lavington Panthers Football & Netball Club is an Australian rules football and netball club and was formed in 1918 and currently competes in the Ovens & Murray Football League.

The club is based in Lavington, a suburb of Albury, New South Wales.

Several Lavington footballers have gone on to play in the Australian Football League, including Darren Holmes, Hamish McIntosh, Allan Murray, Derek Murray, Mark Powell, Campbell Chesser and Shaun Mannagh.

== League honours: Football ==
=== Albury & Border Football Association (1921–1927) ===
- Senior premierships (2):
  - 1922 (Div.2), 1924

=== Central Hume Football Association (1928–1932) ===
- (No listed honours)

=== HFL/Hume Football League (1933–1939) ===
- Senior premierships (1):
  - 1938
- Senior runners-up (2):
  - 1934, 1939
- Senior HFL Best & Fairest winners (1):
  - 1934 - Harold McIntosh

=== Albury & Border Football Association (1945) ===
- Finished 5th of six in 1945 3 wins, 6 losses, 1 draw

=== Chiltern & District Football Association (1946–1956) ===
- Senior runners-up (2):
  - 1955, 1956
- Senior CDFL Best & Fairest winner -
  - 1947 "Huggins Medal" (1): - Brian O'Shaughnessy

=== TDFL / Tallangatta & District Football League (1958–1976) ===
- Senior premierships (3):
  - 1965, 1966, 1971
- Senior runners-up (7):
  - 1960, 1961, 1964, 1969, 1970, 1973, 1974
- Senior TDFL Best & Fairest winners (1):
  - 1973 - Max Urquhart
- Senior TDFL Leading Goal Kickers (2):
  - 1962 & 1963 - Ray Thomas
  - 1976 - Russell Sawyer
- Reserves premierships (5):
  - 1968, 1970, 1971, 1972, 1975
- Thirds premierships (3):
  - 1974, 1975, 1976

=== HFL / Hume Football League (1975–1976) ===
- (No listed honours)

=== Farrer Football League (1977–1978) ===
- (No listed team honours)

=== OMFL / Ovens & Murray Football League (1979–present) ===
- Senior premierships (5):
  - 1983, 1986, 2001, 2005, 2019
- Senior runners-up (10):
  - 1982, 1985, 1987, 1988, 1990, 1996, 1998, 2008, 2015, 2016
- Senior OMFL Best & Fairest winners - "Morris Medal" (2):
  - 1985 - Ralph Aalbers
  - 1987 - Richard Hamilton
- Senior OMFL Leading Goal Kickers - "Doug Strang Medal" (5):
  - 1996, 1997, 1998, 1999 - Chris Stuhldrier,
  - 2015 - Adam Prior
- Reserves premierships (2):
  - 1982, 2015
- Thirds premierships (2):
  - 1993, 2009, 2025

== Honour boards: Football (1921–present) ==
Year	Position	Coach	Best & Fairest	Leading Goal Kicker
Albury & Border Football Association (1921-1927)
1921	4th (Div.2)	A.Romero		
1922	Premiers (Div.2)	J.Mutsch		
1923	3rd (Div.2)	J.Mutsch		
1924	Premiers	E.Strang		
1925	7th	J.Condon		
1926	4th	J.Mutsch		
1927	4th	W.Muller		
Central Hume Football Association (1928-1932)
1928	3rd	T.Gulson		
1929	3rd	H.McIntosh		
1930	6th	A.Romero		
1931	5th	R.Strang		
1932	6th	R.Feitz		
Hume Football Association (1933-1939)
1933	3rd	H.McIntosh		
1934	Runners Up	L.English		
1935	3rd	H.McIntosh		
1936	3rd	H.McIntosh		
1937	5th	W.Dawson		
1938	Premiers	T.Gulson		
1939	Runners Up	R.Gulson		
1940–44	Club in recess > WW2			
Albury & Border Football Association (1945)
1945				
Chiltern & District Football Association (1946-1956)
1946	4th	Tom Gulson	Roly Gulson	
1947	4th	Harold Pattison	Brian O'Shaughnessy	
1948	4th	Colin Scammell	Stan Romero	
1949	6th	Len Donelly	Roy Gardiner	
1950	9th	Con Vapp	Vin Jackson	
1951	8th	Con Vapp	Jack Woodman	
1952	9th	Jack Woodman	Ken Hartley	
1953	3rd	Alan Curtis	Gerry Comans	
1954	4th	Ossie Bownds	Jack Woodman	
1955	Runners Up	Jack Sheridan	Jack Sheridan	
1956	Runners Up	Keith Murray	Ian Grayland	
1957	Chiltern & DFL folded	Sat out '57 awaiting entry to T&DFL in '58		
Tallangatta & District Football League (1958-1976)
1958	4th	Bob Davis	Grant Spurr	Stan Romero - 49+
1959	6th	Percy Appleyard	Bob Davis	Percy Appleyard - 60+
1960	Runners Up	Keith Murray	John Bergin	Neville Collins - 59
1961	Runners Up	Keith Murray	Peter Harmer	-
1962	4th	Ray Thomas	Marty Fitzsimons	Ray Thomas - ?
1963	5th	Ray Thomas	Peter Harmer	Ray Thomas - 75
1964	Runners Up	Doug Gladman	Bill Scammell	Paul Donnolley - 45+
1965	Premiers	Doug Gladman	Detlaf Malakinas	Paul Donnolley - 51+
1966	Premiers	Doug Gladman	Paul Donnolley	Paul Donnolley - 44
1967	4th	Doug Gladman	Bob Thomas	Bill Thomas - 45
1968	6th	John Collis	Bob Thomas	John Collis - 25
1969	Runners Up	Ossie Bownds	Peter Harmer	Allan Wetmore - 46
1970	Runners Up	Graeme O’Brien	Wayne Styles	Graeme O'Brien - 83
1971	Premiers	Graeme O’Brien	Graeme White	Graeme O'Brien - 42
1972	4th	Graeme O’Brien	Graeme White	Russell Sawyer - 44
1973	Runners Up	Max Urquhart (Lavington Saints)	Gary Styles	Max Urquhart - 58
1973	4th	Graeme O’Brien (Lavington Rangers)	David Palmer	Russell Sawyer - 46
1974	Runners Up	Max Urquhart (Lavington Dragons)	Peter King	Peter Frawley - 56
1974	5th	Graeme O’Brien (Lavington Lions)	David Palmer	Ray Thomas - 41+
1974	6th	Tony Moylan (Lavington Rovers)	Paul Spokes	Garry Sheather & Jim Crawford - 21
1975	6th (TDFL)	Max Urquhart (TDFL)	Graeme White	-
1975	3rd (HFL)	Bill Scammell (HFL)	Steve Buckle	Doug Tonkin - 27
1976	3rd (TDFL)	Ray Trebilcock (TDFL)	Max Urquhart	Russell Sawyer - 109
1976	6th (HFL)	Bill Scammell (HFL)	Gary Shipard	Gary Shipard - 32
Farrer Football League (1977-1978)
1977	4th	Wayne Styles	Graeme White	Russell Sawyer - 63
1978	3rd	Wayne Styles	Gary Styles	Ian Gilmore & Mal Haberman - 58
Ovens & Murray Football League (1979 to present day)
1979	10th (Last)	Wayne Styles	David Palmer	Mal Howden - 29
1980	8th	Ken Roberts	Peter Owen	Warren Stanlake - 54
1981	4th	Ken Roberts	Mark Stewart	Adrian Koschel - 66
1982	Runners Up	Ken Roberts	Bruce Stewart	Adrian Koschel - 79
1983	Premiers	Ken Roberts	Bruce Stewart	Warren Stanlake - 51
1984	6th	Ken Roberts	Peter King	Peter King - 39
1985	Runners Up	Jeff Cassidy	Danny Murphy	Jeff Cassidy - 78
1986	Premiers	Jeff Cassidy	Jeff Cassidy	Jeff Cassidy - 55
1987	Runners Up	Jeff Cassidy	Richard Hamilton	Dean Valente - 67
1988	Runners Up	Jeff Cassidy	Andrew Banes	Matt McGuirk - 39
1989	3rd	Richard Hamilton	Kerry Bahr	Matt McGuirk - 42
1990	Runners Up	Richard Hamilton	Ralph Aalbers	Matt McGuirk - 42
1991	7th	Richard Hamilton	Kerry Bahr	James Hodgkin - 55
1992	6th	Neville Shaw	Neville Shaw	James Hodgkin - 61
1993	8th	Neville Shaw	Neville Shaw	James Hodgkin - 36
1994	11th (Last)	Craig Smith	Craig McMillan	Jamie Swinnerton - 26
1995	7th	Bruce Stewart	Shaun Myles	Shaun Myles - 50
1996	Runners Up	Bruce Stewart	Kerry Bahr & Brett Wilson	Chris Stuhldrier - 126
1997	3rd	Bruce Stewart	Luke Carroll	Chris Stuhldrier - 119
1998	Runners Up	Tim Sanson	Mark Sanson	Chris Stuhldrier - 111
1999	5th	Tim Sanson	Kerry Bahr	Chris Stuhldrier - 54
2000	7th	Tim Sanson	Darryn McKimmie	Tim Sanson - 47
2001	Premiers	Tim Sanson	John Hunt & Peter Doherty	Tim Sanson - 80
2002	5th	Tim Sanson	Matthew Pendergast	Tim Sanson - 59
2003	6th	Tim Sanson	Kade Stevens	Tim Sanson - 32
2004	3rd	Tim Sanson	Luke Carroll	Tim Sanson - 31
2005	Premiers	Tim Sanson	Adam Butler	Tim Sanson - 51
2006	3rd	Tim Sanson	Kade Stevens	Jay Banks & Tom Hickey - 37
2007	7th	Tim Sanson	Kade Stevens	Justin Fulton - 25
2008	Runners Up	Tim Sanson	Matthew Pendergast	Darryn McKimmie - 31
2009	6th	Tim Sanson	Bill Neely	Myles Aalbers & Kade Stevens - 19
2010	8th	Tim Sanson	Matthew Pendergast	Andrew Dess - 35
2011	3rd	Tim Sanson	Luke Garland	Myles Aalbers - 40
2012	4th	James Saker	Matthew Pendergast	Myle Aalbers - 33
2013	3rd	James Saker	Luke Garland	Luke Garland - 28
2014	3rd	James Saker	Matthew Pendergast	Adam Prior - 51
2015	Runners Up	James Saker	Nick Meredith	Adam Prior - 79
2016	Runners Up	James Saker	Luke Garland	Adam Prior - 55
2017	4th	James Saker	Martin Brennan	Jack Nunn - 26
2018	5th	Simon Curtis	Simon Curtis	Adam Prior - 37
2019	Premiers	Simon Curtis	Simon Curtis	Shaun Mannagh - 55
2020	In recess: COVID-19	Simon Curtis		
2021	6th: 13 Rds played - No Finals > COVID-19	Simon Curtis		Aidan Johnson - 22
2022	6th	Adam Schneider	William Glanvill	Aidan Cook - 26
2023	7th	Adam Schneider	Shaun Driscoll	Shaun Driscoll; Ewan Mackinlay; Jake O'Brien - 18
2024	7th	Adam Schneider		Tim Oosterhoff - 43
2025	4th	Adam Schneider		Shaun Driscoll - 40
2026		Adam Schneider		
Year	Position	Coach	Best & Fairest	Leading Goal Kicker

== Rugby League Club ==
The Albury Thunder were originally founded as the Albury Blues in 1934, playing in the Group 13 Rugby League competition, in which they won 8 titles. Then in 1991, Group 13 folded, and they moved to Group 9 and they changed their name to the Albury Southern Rams.

Then in 2004, the club was rebranded as Lavington Panthers, the latter name change occurring because of the Penrith Panthers NRL team buying the Rams (and the Lavington Blues Australian Football Club) and renaming them the 'Lavington Panthers RLFC'.

In 2012, after Penrith Leagues Club sold the Lavington Sports Club, the club rebranded to the 'Albury Thunder' name, to be more inclusive to the whole city of Albury, not just the suburb of Lavington. The Australian Football club was to remain as the Lavington Panthers.
