= 1964 VFL season =

68th season of the Victorian Football League (VFL)

1964 VFL premiership season
- Teams: 12
- Premiers: Melbourne; 12th premiership
- Minor premiers: Melbourne; 9th minor premiership
- Consolation series: Footscray; 2nd Consolation series win
- Brownlow Medallist: Gordon Collis (Carlton)
- Coleman Medallist: John Peck (Hawthorn)
- Matches played: 112
- Highest: 102,471

The 1964 VFL season was the 68th season of the Victorian Football League (VFL), the highest level senior Australian rules football competition in Victoria. The season featured twelve clubs, ran from 18 April until 19 September, and comprised an 18-game home-and-away season followed by a finals series featuring the top four clubs.

The premiership was won by the Melbourne Football Club for the twelfth time, after it defeated Collingwood by four points in the 1964 VFL Grand Final.

== Background ==
In 1964, the VFL competition consisted of twelve teams of 18 on-the-field players each, plus two substitute players, known as the 19th man and the 20th man. A player could be substituted for any reason; however, once substituted, a player could not return to the field of play under any circumstances.

Teams played each other in a home-and-away season of 18 rounds; matches 12 to 18 were the "home-and-way reverse" of matches 1 to 7.

Once the 18 round home-and-away season had finished, the 1964 VFL Premiers were determined by the specific format and conventions of the Page–McIntyre system.

== Home-and-away season ==
=== Round 1 ===
Home team	Home team score	Away team	Away team score	Venue	Crowd	Date
Footscray	8.16 (64)	Richmond	5.4 (34)	Western Oval	23,965	18 April 1964
Essendon	12.13 (85)	St Kilda	11.13 (79)	Windy Hill	29,500	18 April 1964
Collingwood	14.15 (99)	Fitzroy	10.11 (71)	Victoria Park	29,255	18 April 1964
Carlton	10.16 (76)	North Melbourne	10.8 (68)	Princes Park	23,053	18 April 1964
South Melbourne	10.13 (73)	Hawthorn	14.13 (97)	Lake Oval	20,260	18 April 1964
Melbourne	14.13 (97)	Geelong	17.8 (110)	MCG	66,250	18 April 1964

=== Round 2 ===
Home team	Home team score	Away team	Away team score	Venue	Crowd	Date
Fitzroy	13.17 (95)	South Melbourne	18.10 (118)	Brunswick Street Oval	17,603	25 April 1964
North Melbourne	8.13 (61)	Melbourne	11.11 (77)	Arden Street Oval	15,914	25 April 1964
St Kilda	13.18 (96)	Footscray	6.7 (43)	Junction Oval	33,600	25 April 1964
Richmond	11.9 (75)	Essendon	15.21 (111)	Punt Road Oval	27,300	25 April 1964
Geelong	14.11 (95)	Collingwood	6.7 (43)	Kardinia Park	40,290	25 April 1964
Hawthorn	9.20 (74)	Carlton	8.5 (53)	Glenferrie Oval	28,000	25 April 1964

=== Round 3 ===
Home team	Home team score	Away team	Away team score	Venue	Crowd	Date
Hawthorn	12.15 (87)	St Kilda	9.11 (65)	Glenferrie Oval	25,000	2 May 1964
Fitzroy	6.12 (48)	Geelong	11.24 (90)	Brunswick Street Oval	15,723	2 May 1964
Essendon	16.11 (107)	North Melbourne	19.7 (121)	Windy Hill	21,000	2 May 1964
South Melbourne	8.7 (55)	Richmond	8.15 (63)	Lake Oval	18,920	2 May 1964
Footscray	8.12 (60)	Collingwood	11.13 (79)	Western Oval	23,983	2 May 1964
Melbourne	11.13 (79)	Carlton	4.9 (33)	MCG	45,494	2 May 1964

=== Round 4 ===
Home team	Home team score	Away team	Away team score	Venue	Crowd	Date
Collingwood	12.13 (85)	South Melbourne	8.9 (57)	Victoria Park	29,237	9 May 1964
Carlton	12.8 (80)	Footscray	16.15 (111)	Princes Park	21,663	9 May 1964
St Kilda	13.15 (93)	Melbourne	9.13 (67)	Junction Oval	35,300	9 May 1964
North Melbourne	14.15 (99)	Hawthorn	9.14 (68)	Arden Street Oval	17,431	9 May 1964
Richmond	14.20 (104)	Fitzroy	5.10 (40)	Punt Road Oval	17,200	9 May 1964
Geelong	8.21 (69)	Essendon	14.7 (91)	Kardinia Park	34,083	9 May 1964

=== Round 5 ===
Home team	Home team score	Away team	Away team score	Venue	Crowd	Date
Richmond	10.14 (74)	St Kilda	8.19 (67)	Punt Road Oval	27,270	16 May 1964
Essendon	7.11 (53)	Melbourne	10.25 (85)	Windy Hill	27,000	16 May 1964
South Melbourne	8.11 (59)	Geelong	11.10 (76)	Lake Oval	24,580	16 May 1964
North Melbourne	15.13 (103)	Footscray	7.14 (56)	Arden Street Oval	20,862	16 May 1964
Hawthorn	16.18 (114)	Fitzroy	8.19 (67)	Glenferrie Oval	13,100	16 May 1964
Collingwood	12.13 (85)	Carlton	9.12 (66)	Victoria Park	32,868	16 May 1964

=== Round 6 ===
Home team	Home team score	Away team	Away team score	Venue	Crowd	Date
Geelong	11.6 (72)	Richmond	8.11 (59)	Kardinia Park	25,264	23 May 1964
Footscray	10.22 (82)	South Melbourne	10.9 (69)	Western Oval	16,437	23 May 1964
Fitzroy	10.18 (78)	North Melbourne	13.17 (95)	Brunswick Street Oval	15,043	23 May 1964
Melbourne	10.13 (73)	Hawthorn	10.8 (68)	MCG	53,795	23 May 1964
Essendon	9.19 (73)	Collingwood	11.3 (69)	Windy Hill	30,300	23 May 1964
St Kilda	13.19 (97)	Carlton	6.13 (49)	Junction Oval	25,300	23 May 1964

=== Round 7 ===
Home team	Home team score	Away team	Away team score	Venue	Crowd	Date
Hawthorn	13.11 (89)	Richmond	7.16 (58)	Glenferrie Oval	22,000	30 May 1964
Geelong	11.23 (89)	St Kilda	13.8 (86)	Kardinia Park	28,000	30 May 1964
Collingwood	22.18 (150)	North Melbourne	6.6 (42)	Victoria Park	34,222	30 May 1964
Carlton	8.12 (60)	Fitzroy	8.11 (59)	Princes Park	18,945	30 May 1964
Melbourne	12.14 (86)	Footscray	6.8 (44)	MCG	33,129	30 May 1964
South Melbourne	11.18 (84)	Essendon	14.12 (96)	Lake Oval	20,470	30 May 1964

=== Round 8 ===
Home team	Home team score	Away team	Away team score	Venue	Crowd	Date
North Melbourne	10.9 (69)	St Kilda	11.17 (83)	Arden Street Oval	19,620	6 June 1964
Footscray	5.5 (35)	Geelong	6.12 (48)	Western Oval	20,000	6 June 1964
Fitzroy	7.9 (51)	Melbourne	17.16 (118)	Brunswick Street Oval	12,727	6 June 1964
Hawthorn	9.8 (62)	Essendon	6.12 (48)	Glenferrie Oval	26,000	6 June 1964
Richmond	3.12 (30)	Collingwood	7.13 (55)	Punt Road Oval	34,600	6 June 1964
South Melbourne	8.13 (61)	Carlton	12.14 (86)	Lake Oval	18,700	6 June 1964

=== Round 9 ===
Home team	Home team score	Away team	Away team score	Venue	Crowd	Date
Essendon	13.10 (88)	Footscray	10.13 (73)	Windy Hill	22,000	13 June 1964
Carlton	11.15 (81)	Richmond	11.12 (78)	Princes Park	24,930	13 June 1964
St Kilda	13.18 (96)	Fitzroy	6.12 (48)	Junction Oval	20,900	13 June 1964
North Melbourne	10.15 (75)	South Melbourne	7.9 (51)	Arden Street Oval	11,763	15 June 1964
Geelong	10.15 (75)	Hawthorn	3.8 (26)	Kardinia Park	39,911	15 June 1964
Melbourne	10.13 (73)	Collingwood	8.15 (63)	MCG	86,664	15 June 1964

=== Round 10 ===
Home team	Home team score	Away team	Away team score	Venue	Crowd	Date
St Kilda	18.15 (123)	South Melbourne	10.8 (68)	Junction Oval	20,300	27 June 1964
Melbourne	23.18 (156)	Richmond	6.7 (43)	MCG	27,614	27 June 1964
Geelong	11.8 (74)	North Melbourne	10.12 (72)	Kardinia Park	20,579	27 June 1964
Collingwood	13.11 (89)	Hawthorn	15.8 (98)	Victoria Park	31,133	27 June 1964
Footscray	14.9 (93)	Fitzroy	13.7 (85)	Western Oval	13,119	27 June 1964
Essendon	10.9 (69)	Carlton	8.15 (63)	Windy Hill	22,000	27 June 1964

=== Round 11 ===
Home team	Home team score	Away team	Away team score	Venue	Crowd	Date
Collingwood	12.11 (83)	St Kilda	10.9 (69)	Victoria Park	27,588	4 July 1964
Carlton	7.19 (61)	Geelong	13.7 (85)	Princes Park	22,293	4 July 1964
Richmond	6.12 (48)	North Melbourne	10.5 (65)	Punt Road Oval	10,170	4 July 1964
South Melbourne	12.11 (83)	Melbourne	18.21 (129)	Lake Oval	10,490	4 July 1964
Hawthorn	12.9 (81)	Footscray	3.3 (21)	Glenferrie Oval	13,000	4 July 1964
Fitzroy	7.8 (50)	Essendon	10.9 (69)	Brunswick Street Oval	11,254	4 July 1964

=== Round 12 ===
Home team	Home team score	Away team	Away team score	Venue	Crowd	Date
Hawthorn	15.13 (103)	South Melbourne	6.15 (51)	Glenferrie Oval	11,000	11 July 1964
Geelong	7.12 (54)	Melbourne	10.15 (75)	Kardinia Park	33,761	11 July 1964
Richmond	12.11 (83)	Footscray	9.7 (61)	Punt Road Oval	12,000	11 July 1964
St Kilda	5.13 (43)	Essendon	11.10 (76)	Junction Oval	30,100	11 July 1964
Fitzroy	5.8 (38)	Collingwood	13.10 (88)	Brunswick Street Oval	17,093	11 July 1964
North Melbourne	6.12 (48)	Carlton	7.5 (47)	Arden Street Oval	16,020	11 July 1964

=== Round 13 ===
Home team	Home team score	Away team	Away team score	Venue	Crowd	Date
Melbourne	18.15 (123)	North Melbourne	6.15 (51)	MCG	29,631	18 July 1964
Footscray	11.9 (75)	St Kilda	10.10 (70)	Western Oval	12,935	18 July 1964
Essendon	13.28 (106)	Richmond	6.8 (44)	Windy Hill	16,100	18 July 1964
Collingwood	8.11 (59)	Geelong	7.7 (49)	Victoria Park	38,218	18 July 1964
Carlton	5.12 (42)	Hawthorn	8.10 (58)	Princes Park	18,423	18 July 1964
South Melbourne	17.15 (117)	Fitzroy	5.14 (44)	Lake Oval	10,350	18 July 1964

=== Round 14 ===
Home team	Home team score	Away team	Away team score	Venue	Crowd	Date
Richmond	13.21 (99)	South Melbourne	5.4 (34)	Punt Road Oval	12,500	25 July 1964
Collingwood	14.15 (99)	Footscray	5.5 (35)	Victoria Park	22,233	25 July 1964
Carlton	9.14 (68)	Melbourne	12.8 (80)	Princes Park	17,831	25 July 1964
St Kilda	11.15 (81)	Hawthorn	7.9 (51)	Junction Oval	18,600	25 July 1964
Geelong	10.22 (82)	Fitzroy	4.3 (27)	Kardinia Park	13,854	25 July 1964
North Melbourne	7.14 (56)	Essendon	12.13 (85)	Arden Street Oval	15,878	25 July 1964

=== Round 15 ===
Home team	Home team score	Away team	Away team score	Venue	Crowd	Date
Melbourne	8.7 (55)	St Kilda	5.7 (37)	MCG	33,212	1 August 1964
Hawthorn	7.7 (49)	North Melbourne	5.8 (38)	Glenferrie Oval	9,100	1 August 1964
Fitzroy	2.9 (21)	Richmond	10.16 (76)	Brunswick Street Oval	7,167	1 August 1964
Essendon	5.13 (43)	Geelong	6.7 (43)	Windy Hill	27,000	1 August 1964
South Melbourne	5.13 (43)	Collingwood	12.13 (85)	Lake Oval	12,600	1 August 1964
Footscray	11.6 (72)	Carlton	10.7 (67)	Western Oval	11,038	1 August 1964

=== Round 16 ===
Home team	Home team score	Away team	Away team score	Venue	Crowd	Date
Geelong	8.9 (57)	South Melbourne	1.9 (15)	Kardinia Park	16,436	8 August 1964
Footscray	10.8 (68)	North Melbourne	4.3 (27)	Western Oval	13,366	8 August 1964
Fitzroy	9.10 (64)	Hawthorn	10.13 (73)	Brunswick Street Oval	7,322	8 August 1964
Carlton	11.13 (79)	Collingwood	12.7 (79)	Princes Park	25,875	8 August 1964
St Kilda	10.12 (72)	Richmond	6.11 (47)	Junction Oval	16,700	8 August 1964
Melbourne	7.6 (48)	Essendon	6.14 (50)	MCG	70,385	8 August 1964

=== Round 17 ===
Home team	Home team score	Away team	Away team score	Venue	Crowd	Date
Hawthorn	10.9 (69)	Melbourne	10.13 (73)	Glenferrie Oval	20,000	15 August 1964
Collingwood	9.14 (68)	Essendon	9.11 (65)	Victoria Park	45,907	15 August 1964
Carlton	6.9 (45)	St Kilda	8.13 (61)	Princes Park	17,178	15 August 1964
Richmond	7.14 (56)	Geelong	12.10 (82)	Punt Road Oval	18,000	15 August 1964
South Melbourne	10.8 (68)	Footscray	10.15 (75)	Lake Oval	11,060	15 August 1964
North Melbourne	11.14 (80)	Fitzroy	12.7 (79)	Arden Street Oval	17,178	15 August 1964

=== Round 18 ===
Home team	Home team score	Away team	Away team score	Venue	Crowd	Date
Footscray	12.6 (78)	Melbourne	4.14 (38)	Western Oval	20,555	22 August 1964
Essendon	28.16 (184)	South Melbourne	2.7 (19)	Windy Hill	16,800	22 August 1964
Richmond	9.18 (72)	Hawthorn	16.19 (115)	Punt Road Oval	15,500	22 August 1964
St Kilda	12.18 (90)	Geelong	11.12 (78)	Junction Oval	27,100	22 August 1964
North Melbourne	8.13 (61)	Collingwood	14.8 (92)	Arden Street Oval	21,895	22 August 1964
Fitzroy	7.12 (54)	Carlton	19.20 (134)	Brunswick Street Oval	14,151	22 August 1964

== Ladder ==
(P)	Premiers
	Qualified for finals

#	Team	P	W	L	D	PF	PA	%	Pts
1	Melbourne (P)	18	14	4	0	1532	1109	138.1	56
2	Collingwood	18	13	4	1	1470	1104	133.2	54
3	Essendon	18	13	4	1	1499	1151	130.2	54
4	Geelong	18	13	4	1	1328	1042	127.4	54
5	Hawthorn	18	13	5	0	1382	1142	121.0	52
6	St Kilda	18	10	8	0	1408	1189	118.4	40
7	Footscray	18	9	9	0	1146	1301	88.1	36
8	North Melbourne	18	8	10	0	1231	1411	87.2	32
9	Richmond	18	6	12	0	1143	1346	84.9	24
10	Carlton	18	5	12	1	1190	1318	90.3	22
11	South Melbourne	18	2	16	0	1125	1654	68.0	8
12	Fitzroy	18	0	18	0	1019	1706	59.7	0

Rules for classification: 1. premiership points; 2. percentage; 3. points for
Average score: 71.6
Source: AFL Tables

== Finals series ==
=== Semi-finals ===
Team	1 Qtr	2 Qtr	3 Qtr	Final
Essendon	4.0	5.3	7.5	10.5 (65)
Geelong	1.5	6.6	9.7	12.12 (84)
Attendance: 92,231

Team	1 Qtr	2 Qtr	3 Qtr	Final
Melbourne	2.3	8.7	14.13	19.20 (134)
Collingwood	2.2	3.6	5.8	6.9 (45)
Attendance: 93,010

=== Preliminary final ===
Team	1 Qtr	2 Qtr	3 Qtr	Final
Collingwood	2.1	4.2	6.6	7.6 (48)
Geelong	2.4	4.8	4.10	5.14 (44)
Attendance: 87,091

=== Grand final ===
Team	1 Qtr	2 Qtr	3 Qtr	Final
Melbourne	2.6	5.7	7.10	8.16 (64)
Collingwood	2.5	5.9	5.11	8.12 (60)
Attendance: 102,471

== Consolation Night Series Competition ==
The night series were held under the floodlights at Lake Oval, South Melbourne, for the teams (5th to 12th on ladder) out of the finals at the end of the season.

Final: Footscray 11.12 (78) defeated St Kilda 11.7 (73).

== Season notes ==
- Fitzroy failed to win a game, known as an 'imperfect season'. This was the last recorded imperfect season by any club.
- Shortly before the start of the season, St Kilda came to an arrangement with the City of Moorabbin that it would move its playing and administrative base from the Junction Oval to the Moorabbin Oval from the 1965 season, becoming the first club to voluntarily move from its traditional home ground. St Kilda was motivated by the desire to manage and operate its own venue, including a licensed social club, rather than remain in its current situation where the St Kilda Cricket Club managed the operations of the ground. A group of members sought an injunction to prevent the move, and in May the Supreme Court allowed the move provided there was a vote among the club's members, which ultimately saw a 75% majority in favour of the move. The move had ramifications in the Victorian Football Association, where the local Moorabbin Football Club was expelled from the competition for supporting the Saints and the council in their moves.
- Carlton's Gordon Collis was reported in Round 6, but the charge was not upheld and he went on to win the Brownlow Medal.
- At the end of the Round 10 match between Geelong and North Melbourne at Kardinia Park, North Melbourne coach, 5'4" (163 cm) Alan Killigrew was king-hit in the players race by an officially unidentified Geelong player. A brief brawl ensued, with Killigrew emerging with his face covered in blood. The VFL initiates an inquiry into the matter, involving the examination of 20 different witnesses. On 20 July the VFL announces that no charges will be laid against Geelong's 6'2" (188 cm) Geoff Rosenow. In mid-August, Rosenow, Killigrew, Allen Aylett and North Melbourne committee member Al Mantello received police summonses relating to the incident.
- In Round 13, North Melbourne rover and professional dentist Allen Aylett broke his left arm, and retired immediately.
- On 22 August 1964 (Round 18), St Kilda played its farewell home game at the Junction Oval. On the same day, Richmond played its last home game, and the last VFL match, at the Punt Road Oval, as the club began playing its home games at the Melbourne Cricket Ground from 1965; it was not known at the time that this was a farewell match for the venue, as the deal to change grounds was not made until after the season.

== Awards ==
- The 1964 VFL Premiership team was Melbourne.
- The VFL's leading goalkicker was John Peck of Hawthorn who kicked 68 goals.
- The winner of the 1964 Brownlow Medal was awarded to Gordon Collis of Carlton with 28 votes (he was reported in Round 6, but was cleared).
- Fitzroy claimed the "wooden spoon" in 1964; as of 2025, it is the most recent team to endure a winless VFL/AFL season.
- The reserves premiership was won by Geelong. Geelong 9.13 (67) defeated Richmond 6.8 (44) in the Grand Final, held as a curtain-raiser to the seniors Grand Final at the Melbourne Cricket Ground on 19 September.

== Sources ==
- 1964 VFL season at AFL Tables
- 1964 VFL season at Australian Football
