= Simon Taylor (footballer, born 1970) =

Australian rules footballer

Personal information
- Full name: Simon B. Taylor
- Born: 13 December 1970 (age 55)
- Original teams: Montmorency, (Diamond Valley FL)
- Draft: #30, 1992 Pre-season Draft

Playing career^{1}
Years	Club	Games (Goals)
1989	Collingwood	2 (1)
- ^{1} Playing statistics correct to the end of 1989.

Simon Taylor (born 13 December 1970) is a former Australian rules footballer who played two games for Collingwood in the Victorian Football League (VFL) in 1989.

He was recruited from the Montmorency Football Club in the Diamond Valley Football League. After being delisted by Collingwood, he returned to Montmorency before being drafted by Fitzroy with the 30th selection in the 1992 Pre-season Draft. He never played a senior game for Fitzroy, but was appoint coach of the revived Fitzroy Football Club when they entered the D-Grade section of the Victorian Amateur Football Association in 2009.
