= Mark Powell (footballer) =

Australian rules footballer (born 1984)

Personal information
- Born: 15 March 1984 (age 42)
- Original team: Lavington/Murray U18
- Debut: Round 6, 3 May 2003, Sydney Swans vs. Collingwood, at Colonial Stadium

Playing career^{1}
Years	Club	Games (Goals)
2002–2005	Sydney Swans	8 (0)
- ^{1} Playing statistics correct to the end of 2005.

Mark Powell (born 15 March 1984) is an Australian rules footballer in the Australian Football League. He lived in Narrandera and played for his junior club Narrandera Eagles until he was 15 and then he moved to Albury where he played for Lavington FC to further his AFL ambitions.

He was selected at no 28 in the 2nd round of the 2001 National Draft to the Sydney Swans, and was touted as a key position defender.

In 2002 he played no senior games, in 2003 he played 5 senior games, 3 senior games in 2004, and none in 2005.

Following the end of the 2005 season he was traded to the Kangaroos. However, in January 2006 Powell quit the club, citing having lost motivation to play football and wanting to move back to Sydney.
