= North Fitzroy Kangaroos Football Club =

North Fitzroy Kangaroos

Names
- Full name: North Fitzroy Kangaroos Football Club
- Nickname(s): North, Fitzroy, Kangaroos, Lions

Club details
- Founded: 11 May 1996
- Dissolved: 4 July 1996
- Colours: Maroon, Blue and White
- Competition: Australian Football League
- President: Ron Casey
- Ground: Princes Park
- Training ground: Arden Street

The North Fitzroy Kangaroos was a proposed professional Australian rules football club which was to have formed from the merger between the Fitzroy Football Club and the North Melbourne Football Club, and was to have competed in the Australian Football League from 1997 onwards. The merger was arranged in May 1996 to avert the imminent financial collapse of Fitzroy, but was abandoned within two months of its announcement following clashes of interest from multiple parties. The abandonment resulted in North Melbourne remaining as a stand-alone club as it is today, and the league administrators forcing Fitzroy, then nicknamed as the 'Lions', to relocate to Brisbane and merge with the Brisbane Football Club to form what is now the Brisbane Lions Football Club.

== Background ==
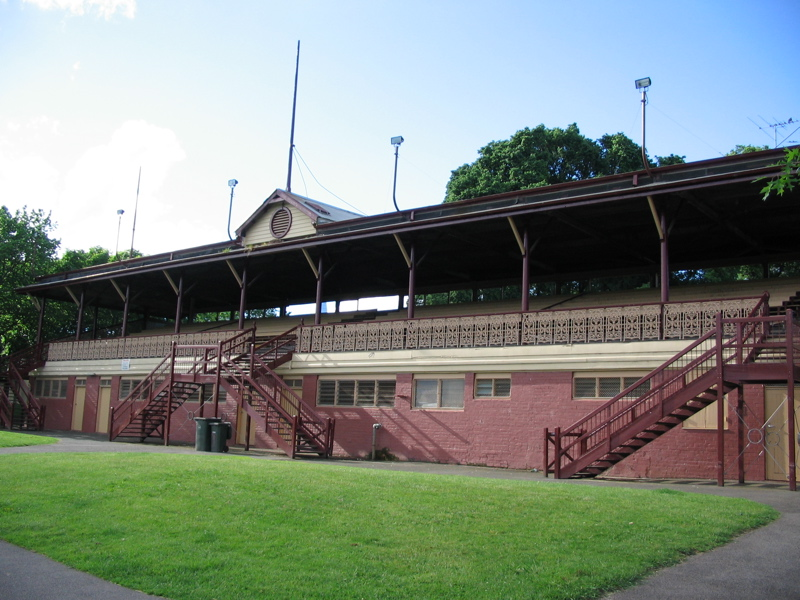
The main grandstand at the Brunswick Street Oval, built in 1888, stood in a state of disrepair and did not meet minimum VFL stadium safety regulations from 1966 onwards

Despite Fitzroy being a successful and strongly competitive club from the 1890s to the 1950s, winning eight VFL premierships and one VFA premiership, the 1966 VFL season is arguably considered to be what was the beginning of the club's hardships, when tenancy issues arose with the club's spiritual home of Brunswick Street Oval. The difficulties with operations and maintenance of the stadium, caused by the unwillingness of the cricket club and the local city Council to work with the club in repairing and renovating the venue to something approaching VFL standsrds, saw them leave the oval in 1966. They would never play another VFL/AFL match again at the oval, with the club relocating five times between Princes Park, the Junction Oval, the Western Oval and Victoria Park. The cricket club to this day has been criticised for playing a part in the football club's downfall; as at the time, the football club could have afforded to make repairs to the venue, but in declining damaged the long term viability of the football club. The cricket club ultimately left Brunswick Street Oval in the 1980s when it merged with the Doncaster cricket club, and only occasionally plays a few matches at the oval.

Along with stadium issues, and despite winning the 1978 Night Series Tournament and long-time captain Kevin Murray winning the 1969 Brownlow Medal whilst playing for the club, financial difficulties began threatening the club's long term viability further. This was illustrated by the club accumulating three wooden spoons between the 1963 and 1966seasons, prior to the stadium difficulties, and the club would further be non-competitive for over a decade later. Regardless of the club becoming competitive again in the early 1980s with the recruiting of key individual players, in which Fitzroy lost the 1986 preliminary final to the eventual premiers in Hawthorn, the same year would the club's first official financial loss, in posting a AUD250,000 deficit at the season's conclusion. It would later prove to be the last final series Fitzroy ever participated in. Immediately following the season's conclusion, Fitzroy discussed merger possibilities with the Melbourne Football Club who were also facing financial difficulty but of a lesser extent, in forming the 'Melbourne Lions Football Club'. As both club's immediate solvency to trade wasn't seen as threatened, immediate merger talks collapsed by mutual consent, with the two clubs remaining on good terms, and would later recommence merger talks during the 1994 season. Relocation to Brisbane was also discussed in 1986, with the playing squad one Sunday morning after a training session overwhelmingly voting in favor of relocation to Brisbane if it were to go ahead.

Despite winning the 1989 reserves' league grand final and producing players that would later have successful careers in the league, losses were still being posted following the 1986 season. At the 1989 season's conclusion, league administrators proposed a merger between Fitzroy and Footscray, who were also struggling both financially and with its home venue in the Western Oval, to form the Fitzroy Bulldogs Football Club. As it was seen by the Footscray supporters as a takeover, with home matches to be moved to Princes Park, and with general class conflict between supporters as Fitzroy and Fitzroy North residents were of considerably higher average incomes over Melbourne's west. The secretive nature of the merger negotiations, and lack of consultation with members, also drove much of the anger from fans. Weeks later following the announcement of the proposal, the Footscray supporters managed to raise over AUD1.5 million to save their club from the merger, which resulted in the merger being rejected. Footscray (now the Western Bulldogs) would later win their first premiership after the proposed merger 27 years later, in 2016.

Following the failure to merge with Footscray, Fitzroy later held merger discussion in the early 1990s with the Richmond, Hawthorn, and St Kilda football clubs, all of which failed.

== Summary ==
Fourteen of the fifteen other clubs—with Richmond Football Club being the most vocal—declined the merger club's demands in fears of the creation of a Victorian 'super club' with fears of a strong fan base and on-field dominance with the proposed 50-man playing list which would amalgamate the talent of both clubs. The second, and more serious, reason was that the Australian Football League administrators, working with a major creditor of Fitzroy, saw the financially weak club be of better financial strength in merging with the Brisbane Football Club, to become what is now the Brisbane Lions Football Club.
