= Darren Holmes (footballer) =

Australian rules footballer

Personal information
- Full name: Darren Holmes
- Born: 3 September 1970 (age 56)
- Original teams: Walla Walla, Lavington
- Height: 188 cm (6 ft 2 in)
- Weight: 83 kg (183 lb)

Playing career^{1}
Years	Club	Games (Goals)
1991–1994	Sydney Swans	42 (6)
1995–1996	Fitzroy	21 (3)
Total		63 (9)
- ^{1} Playing statistics correct to the end of 1996.

Darren Holmes (born 3 September 1970) is a former Australian rules footballer who played with the Sydney Swans and Fitzroy in the Australian Football League (AFL) during the 1990s.

Holmes was originally from Walla Walla in the Hume Football League and won the league Thirds best and fairest award in 1986.

Holmes was then recruited to Lavington in the Ovens & Murray Football League and played in their 1988 grand final loss to Wangaratta Rovers, prior to playing with Sydney Swans.

A utility, Holmes had his most productive year in 1992 when he made 19 appearances and after two more seasons was traded to Fitzroy. He was a member of the last Fitzroy squad in the AFL, playing seven games in the 1996 AFL season.

Holmes had the misfortune of playing in five consecutive wooden spoon sides, with Sydney from 1992 to 1994 and then at Fitzroy in the next two seasons. Overall, of the 63 career games he played, he was on the victorious side just 10 times.

Holmes was the man who tackled the piglet which had been set loose during a game against St Kilda at the Sydney Cricket Ground, to ridicule the weight of then-St Kilda full-forward Tony Lockett, in 1993.

Holmes coached Yackandandah in the Tallangatta & District Football League between 2020 and 2024, culminating in the 2024 premiership.
