= Max Urquhart =

Australian rules footballer (born 1942)

Personal information
- Born: 7 January 1942 (age 84)
- Original teams: Urana, Corowa
- Height: 182 cm (6 ft 0 in)
- Weight: 83 kg (183 lb)

Playing career^{1}
Years	Club	Games (Goals)
1963–1969	Collingwood	92 (28)
- ^{1} Playing statistics correct to the end of 1969.

Max Urquhart (born 7 January 1942) is a former Australian rules footballer who played for Collingwood in the Victorian Football League (VFL) during the 1960s.

Urquhart, a New South Welshman, who played in the 1959 Coreen & District Football League premiership with Urana - Cullival FC, having first played in the Urana seniors as a fourteen year old.

Urquhart was runner up in the 1960 Coreen & District Football League best and fairest award, the Archie Dennis Medal by one vote.

Urquhart then went onto the Corowa Football Club where he was recruited from and many belief he was a wet weather specialist and played mainly as a centreman or centre-half forward.

He was Collingwood's leading vote getter in the 1964 Brownlow Medal count and finished equal fourth overall. In the same year he came off the bench in the 1964 VFL Grand Final, which Collingwood lost to Melbourne.

Urquhart played 14 games in 1966, but missed out on selection as a member of Collingwood's 1966 VFL Grand Final side that lost to St. Kilda.

He later played at Wynyard Football Club and represented Tasmania at the 1972 Perth Carnival.

Urquhart won the 1973 Tallangatta & District Football League best and fairest award, while playing with Lavington Saints.
