= Ray Thomas (footballer, born 1940) =

Australian rules footballer (1940–2021)

Personal information
- Full name: Ray Thomas
- Born: 2 July 1940
- Died: 20 May 2021 (aged 80)
- Original team: Albury
- Height: 175 cm (5 ft 9 in)
- Weight: 73 kg (161 lb)

Playing career^{1}
Years	Club	Games (Goals)
1956 - 1960	Albury	? (?)
1961	Collingwood	4 (1)
1962 - 1963	Lavington(T&DFL)	? (?)
1964 - 1973	Albury	197 (31)
1974	Lavington(T&DFL)	? (41+)
1975	Jindera	? (?)
- ^{1} Playing statistics correct to the end of 1961.

Ray Thomas (2 July 1940 – 20 May 2021) was an Australian rules footballer who played with Collingwood in the Victorian Football League (VFL).

Thomas won Albury's best and fairest in 1960 prior to playing with Collingwood.

Thomas was captain-coach of Lavington in 1962 and 1963 and kicked 75 goals in 1963 and finished third in the Tallangatta & District Football League best and fairest award.

Thomas returned to Albury in 1964 and all up he played 197 senior Ovens & Murray Football League games for Albury and finished third in the 1969 Morris Medal.

Thomas won the 1966 / 130 yards Burramine Gift in 12.10 seconds, off a handicap of 8 and 3/4 yards, picking up the first prize of $150. Thomas made the final of the 1965 Stawell Gift.

Thomas was inducted in the Ovens & Murray Football League Hall of Fame in 2007.

Thomas was farewelled at a funeral in Albury on Thursday, 3rd June 2021.
