= Percy Appleyard =

Australian rules footballer

Personal information
- Full name: Percy Appleyard
- Born: 9 March 1935 (age 91)
- Original teams: Culcairn, Bandiana, Wodonga
- Height: 188 cm (6 ft 2 in)
- Weight: 84 kg (185 lb)
- Position: Ruckman

Playing career^{1}
Years	Club	Games (Goals)
1957, 1960	South Melbourne	10 (8)
- ^{1} Playing statistics correct to the end of 1960.

Percy Appleyard (born 9 March 1935) is a former Australian rules footballer who played with South Melbourne in the Victorian Football League (VFL).

Appleyard won the 1953 Tallangatta & District Football League best and fairest award, when playing with the RAEME FC (Bandiana).

Appleyard played with Wodonga in the Ovens & Murray Football League between 1954 and 1958 and kicked 100 goals.

Appleyard was captain / coach of the Lavington Football Club in 1959 in the Tallangatta & District Football League.
