= Neville Shaw =

Australian footballer

Personal information
- Full name: Neville William Shaw
- Born: 4 October 1964 (age 62); Manchester, England
- Original team: Keon Park Stars
- Height: 175 cm (5 ft 9 in)
- Weight: 73 kg (161 lb)

Playing career^{1}
Years	Club	Games (Goals)
1984–1986	Collingwood	43 (28)
- ^{1} Playing statistics correct to the end of 1986.

Neville William Shaw (born 4 October 1964) is a former Australian rules footballer who played with Collingwood in the Victorian Football League (VFL).

Shaw, a Keon Park Stars recruit, was the youngest of three brothers to play for Collingwood. Ray Shaw, 10 years older, had finished his Collingwood career by the time Neville came to the club but he did get to play with his other brother Tony.

Not picked for the opening two rounds of the 1984 season, Shaw made his debut against Essendon at Windy Hill and was a regular fixture for the rest of the year, with his only stint on the sidelines being because of a two-week suspension, for striking Hawthorn's Russell Shields. His 20 appearances in 1984 included three finals.

In 1985 he missed two weeks after being injured in a car accident and another five when he dislocated his shoulder, but Shaw still managed to put together 15 games.

Shaw played in the first eight rounds of the 1986 season, then tore a cruciate ligament in his right knee, which ruled him out for the rest of the year. He wouldn't play again for Collingwood.

He finished the decade at West Adelaide, where he won back to back club Best and Fairest awards in 1988 and 1989.

In 1992 and 1993, Shaw coached Lavington in the Ovens & Murray Football League, winning a Best and Fairest in each those years.
