= Hamish McIntosh =

Australian rules footballer

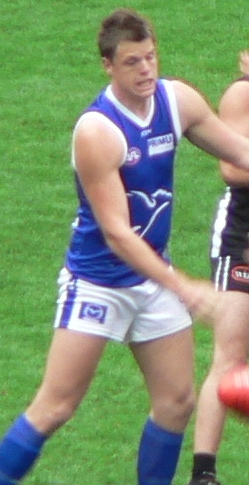
- McIntosh playing for North Melbourne in 2006

Personal information
- Full name: Hamish McIntosh
- Born: 4 September 1984 (age 42); Lavington, New South Wales
- Original teams: Lavington, Murray Bushrangers
- Draft: No. 9, 2002 National Draft
- Height: 203 cm (6 ft 8 in)
- Weight: 103 kg (227 lb)
- Position: Ruckman

Playing career^{1}
Years	Club	Games (Goals)
2003–2012	North Melbourne	107 (59)
2013–2015	Geelong	19 (7)
Total		126 (66)
- ^{1} Playing statistics correct to the end of 2015.

Hamish McIntosh (born 4 September 1984) is a former professional Australian rules footballer who played for the North Melbourne Football Club and Geelong Football Club in the Australian Football League (AFL).

== Early life ==
From Lavington, New South Wales on the Murray River, he played his under-18 football with Murray Bushrangers in the TAC Cup.

Drafted by North Melbourne in the 2002 AFL draft at pick 9, McIntosh had ankle problems in 2003, and when he arrived at the club, coach Dean Laidley said "he couldn't bench 40 kg".

== AFL career ==
In his second year he sprained his ankle and finally, after two seasons of waiting, McIntosh got a game against Adelaide in round 6, 2005. He was not selected for the rest of the year but was an emergency eight times.

McIntosh's break came in an exhibition match at UCLA in Los Angeles. He was named man of the match in an easy win against the Sydney Swans.

In 2007, McIntosh averaged over 15 possessions a game. He was picked in the 40 man All-Australian squad. However, he missed the final cut.

The 2008 season was a terrible one for McIntosh. He ruptured his posterior cruciate ligament against Fremantle in round 12. He made a return later in the season but he could not reach the heights he achieved in the 2007 season. He was offered as trade bait by Dean Laidley, which angered McIntosh. Ultimately he was not traded and had a good 2008 season in which he was considered as a contender for All-Australian selection.

McIntosh enjoyed a strong 2010 season, during which he formed a highly effective ruck pairing with Todd Goldstein. But prior to the 2011 season, McIntosh required surgery on both Achilles tendons, and played just one game for the season. He returned for round 1, 2012, memorably missing a shot at goal after the final siren which allowed opponents Essendon a two-point victory. McIntosh suffered a knee injury in round 7 which eventually required surgery, restricting him to just seven games for the year. In October 2012, McIntosh was traded to Geelong for a second-round draft pick.

McIntosh signed a three-year contract with the Cats, but his 2013 season was ruined by various leg injuries and he failed to play a single game. The 2014 season was a better one for McIntosh, making his Geelong debut in round 1 and going on to play 19 games, including a final. He swapped main rucking duties with Dawson Simpson. But injuries hit McIntosh again in the 2015 season, with further knee and calf tendon problems. He was forced into retirement on 29 July 2015 after an ankle injury.

== Statistics ==
Legend
G	Goals	K	Kicks	D	Disposals	T	Tackles
B	Behinds	H	Handballs	M	Marks	H/O	Hit-outs

Season	Team	No.	Games	Totals								Averages (per game)							
Season	Team	No.	Games	G	B	K	H	D	M	T	H/O	G	B	K	H	D	M	T	H/O
2003	Kangaroos	33	0	—	—	—	—	—	—	—	—	—	—	—	—	—	—	—	—
2004	Kangaroos	33	0	—	—	—	—	—	—	—	—	—	—	—	—	—	—	—	—
2005	Kangaroos	33	1	0	0	5	1	6	0	1	2	0.0	0.0	5.0	1.0	6.0	0.0	1.0	2.0
2006	Kangaroos	1	17	8	5	105	65	170	72	11	127	0.5	0.3	6.2	3.8	10.0	4.2	0.6	7.5
2007	Kangaroos	1	25	12	10	252	140	392	109	24	463	0.5	0.4	10.1	5.6	15.7	4.4	1.0	18.5
2008	North Melbourne	1	14	4	2	98	88	186	55	18	223	0.3	0.1	7.0	6.3	13.3	3.9	1.3	15.9
2009	North Melbourne	1	22	13	3	174	188	362	112	45	514	0.6	0.1	7.9	8.5	16.5	5.1	2.0	23.4
2010	North Melbourne	1	20	14	12	140	154	294	92	36	400	0.7	0.6	7.0	7.7	14.7	4.6	1.8	20.0
2011	North Melbourne	1	1	1	0	8	7	15	5	2	10	1.0	0.0	8.0	7.0	15.0	5.0	2.0	10.0
2012	North Melbourne	1	7	7	3	62	48	110	31	19	157	1.0	0.4	8.9	6.9	15.7	4.4	2.7	22.4
2013	Geelong	17	0	—	—	—	—	—	—	—	—	—	—	—	—	—	—	—	—
2014	Geelong	17	19	7	8	141	121	262	72	49	380	0.4	0.4	7.4	6.4	13.8	3.8	2.6	20.0
2015	Geelong	17	0	—	—	—	—	—	—	—	—	—	—	—	—	—	—	—	—
Career			126	66	43	985	812	1797	548	205	2276	0.5	0.3	7.8	6.4	14.3	4.3	1.6	18.1
