= Shaun Mannagh =

Australian rules footballer (born 1997)

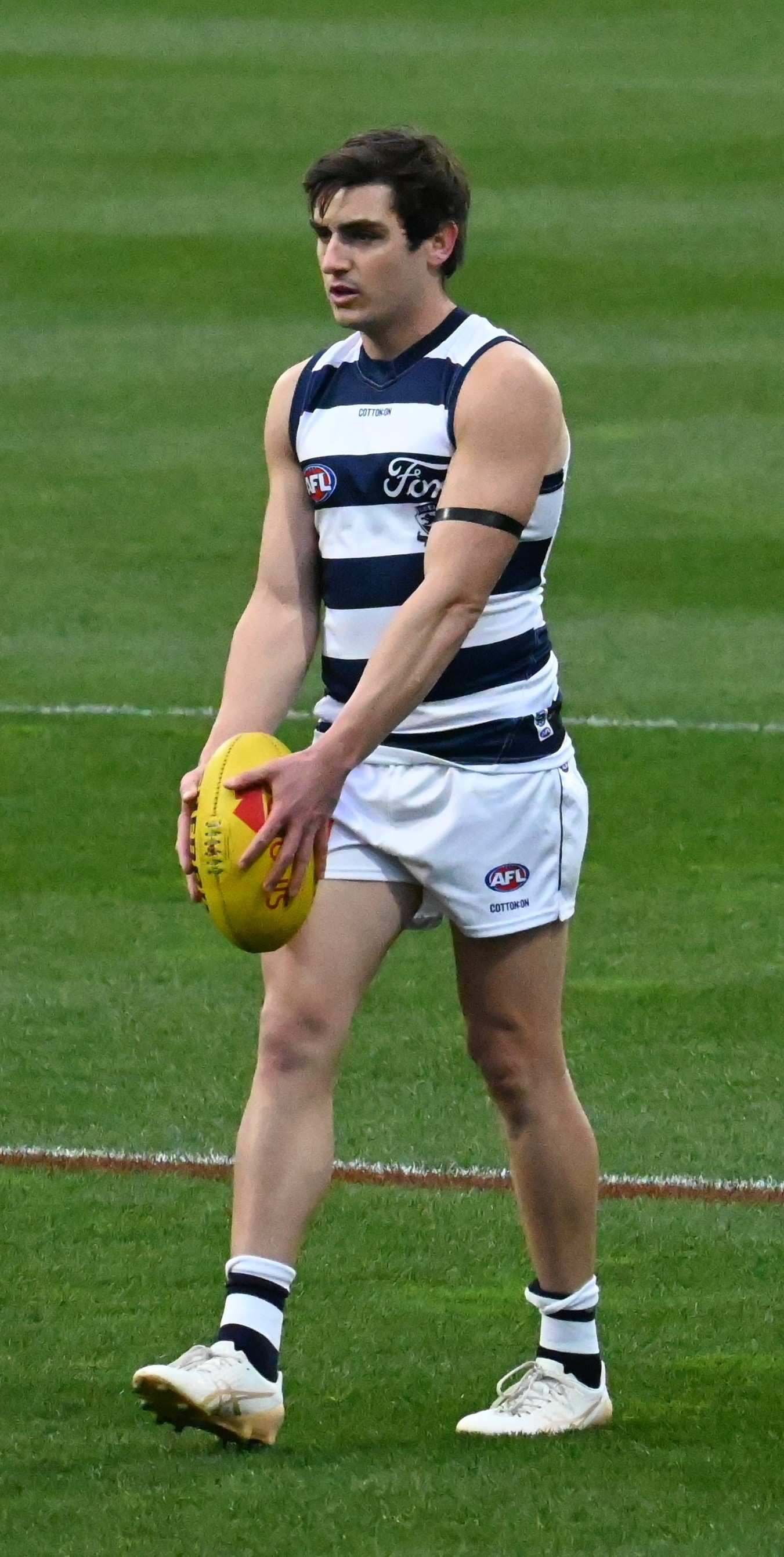
- Mannagh playing for Geelong in 2024

Personal information
- Born: 6 August 1997 (age 29)
- Original teams: Walla Walla, Murray Bushrangers, North Albury, Richmond (VFL), Lavington, Werribee (VFL)
- Draft: No. 36, 2023 national draft
- Debut: Round 1, 2024, Geelong vs. St Kilda, at Kardinia Park
- Height: 178 cm (5 ft 10 in)
- Weight: 81 kg (179 lb)
- Position: Small forward

Club information
- Current club: Geelong
- Number: 7

Playing career^{1}
Years	Club	Games (Goals)
2024–	Geelong	60 (84)
- ^{1} Playing statistics correct to the end of 2026.

Career highlights
- AFLCA best young player award: 2025; Walla Walla seniors best & fairest (2013); Lavington O&MFL Premiership (2019); Did Simpson Medal O&MFL (2019); Norm Goss Memorial Medal (2023)

Shaun Mannagh (born 6 August 1997) is a professional Australian rules footballer who plays for the Geelong Cats in the Australian Football League (AFL).

== Early career ==
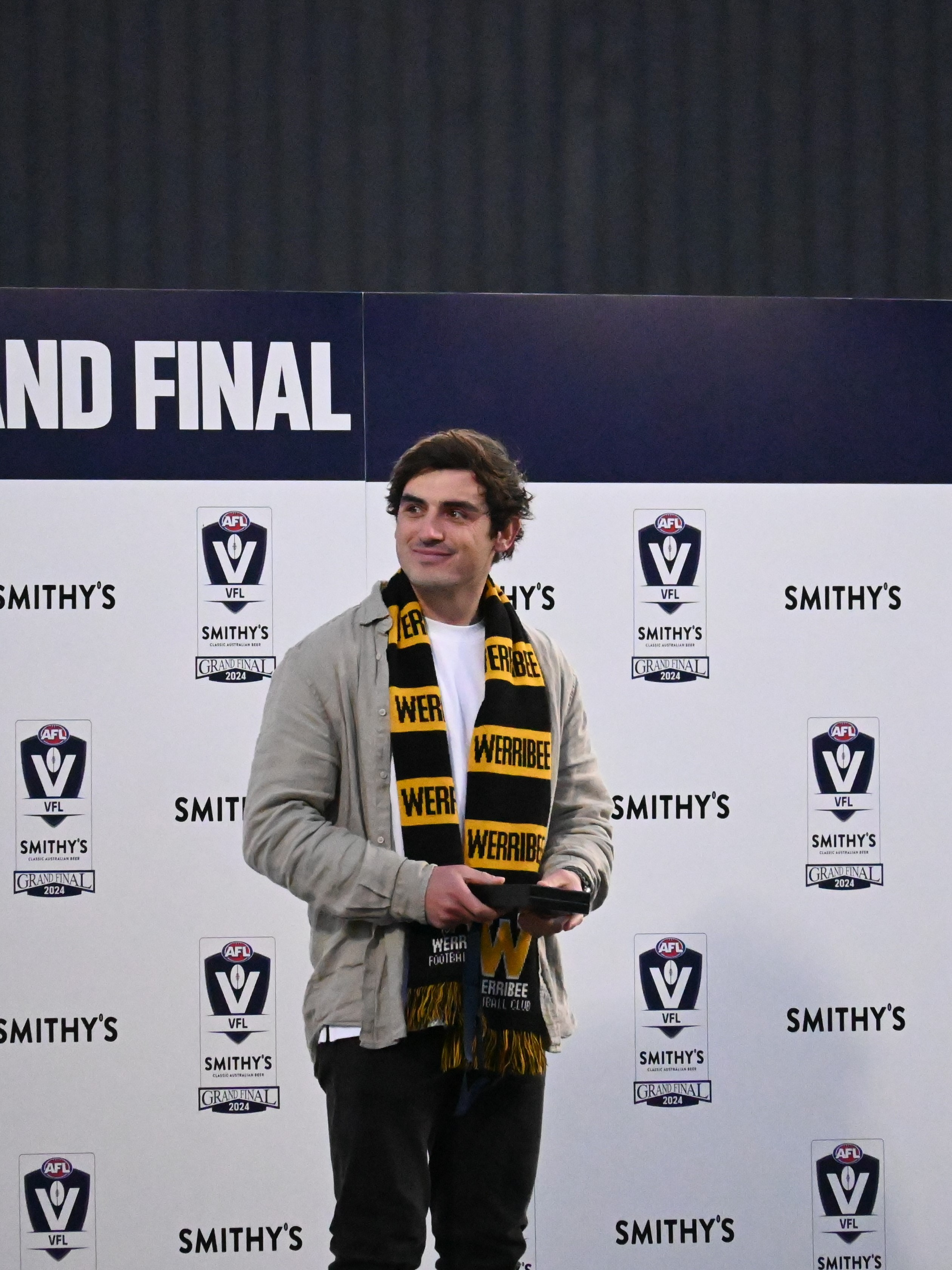
Mannagh wearing a Werribee scarf at the 2024 VFL Grand Final

Originally from Walla Walla in the Hume Football League, Mannagh represented the NSW / ACT Under 16 Rams at the National Championships in 2013, while playing with Walla Walla and winning their 2013 seniors best and fairest.

Mannagh then played with the Murray Bushrangers in 2014 and 2015 in the TAC Cup and also played with North Albury in the Ovens & Murray Football Netball League from 2014 to 2018. Mannagh also represented the Ovens & Murray Football Netball League in the senior interleague side in 2016 too.

Mannagh was then recruited to Richmond's VFL reserves team where he played with them from 2017 to 2019. While remaining on Richmond's VFL list, Mannagh returned to the Ovens & Murray League, this time playing for Lavington in 2019 and was best on ground in their 2019 premiership with five goals, winning the Did Simpson Medal.

Mannagh spent the summer of 2020/2021 playing in the Northern Territory Football League with the Wanderers Football Club, who lost the preliminary final to St Mary's Football Club (NTFL).

Mannagh then played for Werribee in the VFL from 2021 to 2023, where he was runner up in the club's 2021 and 2023 best and fairest and finished 3rd in Werribee's best and fairest award in 2022.

He then kicked six goals from 28 disposals in a losing Grand Final against the Gold Coast Suns in 2023, awarded the Norm Goss Memorial Medal as best afield.

After a few years of attracting the attention of AFL clubs, his Grand Final performances were enough to enter the national draft as a mature-aged rookie. Mannagh had a medical with Fremantle, an interview with Port Adelaide, and even mid-season draft conversations with Western Bulldogs before finally being chosen by Geelong in the second round of that year's national draft.

== AFL career ==
Mannagh was drafted by Geelong in the 2023 national draft at pick 36 as a mature-aged recruit. He made his senior debut at 26 years of age against St Kilda at GMHBA Stadium in round 1 of 2024. He kicked his first career goal against Adelaide the next week at Adelaide Oval, before he was omitted from the team for Geelong's Easter Monday clash with rivals Hawthorn.

Mannagh played his first final in September 2024 against Port Adelaide at Adelaide Oval. He was one of the best players on the ground, involved in 13 scores and kicking three goals, two of which came in a dominant third quarter. Mannagh's forward craft set up a home preliminary final for the Cats.

== Statistics ==
Updated to the end of round 22, 2026.

Legend
G	Goals	K	Kicks	D	Disposals	T	Tackles
B	Behinds	H	Handballs	M	Marks

Season	Team	No.	Games	Totals							Averages (per game)							Votes
Season	Team	No.	Games	G	B	K	H	D	M	T	G	B	K	H	D	M	T	Votes
2024	Geelong	7	12	15	12	142	53	195	24	54	1.3	1.0	11.8	4.4	16.3	2.0	4.5	0
2025	Geelong	7	23	31	20	305	116	421	84	112	1.3	0.9	13.3	5.0	18.3	3.7	4.9	2
2026	Geelong	7	25	38	21	302	136	438	65	76	1.5	0.8	12.1	5.4	17.5	2.6	3.0	9
Career			60	84	53	749	305	1054	173	242	1.4	0.9	12.5	5.1	17.6	2.9	4.0	11
