= Ken Roberts (footballer, born 1952) =

Australian rules footballer

Personal information
- Full name: Ken W. Roberts
- Born: 13 May 1952 (age 74)
- Original team: Essendon Baptists-St John's
- Height: 185 cm (6 ft 1 in)
- Weight: 85 kg (187 lb)

Playing career^{1}
Years	Club	Games (Goals)
1970–1977	Essendon	100 (111)
1978–1979	Melbourne	12 (16)
Total		112 (127)
- ^{1} Playing statistics correct to the end of 1979.

Ken W. Roberts (born 13 May 1952) is a former Australian rules footballer who played with Essendon and Melbourne in the Victorian Football League (VFL).

Roberts, the son of a Richmond player of the same name, was a utility. He started out in the Essendon Under 19s, after arriving to the club from Essendon Baptists-St John's. In 1973 he kicked a career high 36 goals for the season, which ended prematurely with a knee injury. He finished his VFL career at Melbourne, where he played 12 senior games.

From 1980 to 1984, Roberts was captain-coach of the Lavington Football Club. He steered them to a premiership in 1983, their first in the Ovens & Murray Football League. In 1985 he captain-coached Queensland club Kedron.
