= Dyson Hore-Lacy =

Dyson Hore-Lacy SC is an Australian barrister, human rights advocate, author and former Fitzroy Football Club president.

== Legal career ==
Dyson was admitted to practice in Victoria, New South Wales, Tasmania, Queensland, Western Australia and Northern Territory and was admitted to Victorian Bar in 1967. He has had a distinguished career practising in criminal and commercial law, and was made QC in 1995.

An advocate of human rights, Dyson has practiced extensively in cases involving human rights abuses in Australia, including for Aboriginals in the Northern Territory and Western Australia. He worked as senior counsel in a high-profile complaint to United Nations Human Rights Committee. Dyson's expertise are in insurance, discrimination, contracts and cases of medical negligence.

== Libel incident ==
In his book, Getting Away with Murder, author Phil Cleary alleged that Mr Hore-Lacy helped a man who killed his own wife to manufacture a provocation defence. This defamatory allegation was proven to be false, and a jury chose to award Hore-Lacy $30,000 in exemplary damages to punish Cleary and his publisher, in addition to $600,000 in compensatory and aggravated damages.

== Chairman of the Fitzroy Football Club ==
Dyson Hore-Lacy succeeded Leon Wiegard as Chairman of the Fitzroy board after the Gary Pert contractual dispute in 1991. During his tenure, the Fitzroy Football Club faced an existential crisis as the Australian Football League sought to force a merger of the club. This crisis was brought to a head on 28 June 1996 when the Nauru Insurance Company sought repayment of a $1.25 million loan.

Mr Hore-Lacy later authored Fitzroy, which detailed his experiences during his time as chairman of the club.

== Bibliography ==
- Fitzroy (Fitzroy : Lion Publications, 2000, ISBN 1-876557-33-8)
