= Jeff Cassidy =

Australian rules footballer

Personal information
- Full name: Jeffrey Cassidy
- Born: 27 September 1956 (age 70)
- Original team: Cobram
- Height: 183 cm (6 ft 0 in)
- Weight: 83 kg (183 lb)

Playing career^{1}
Years	Club	Games (Goals)
1974–1980	Geelong	50 (20)
1977, 1981–1984	East Fremantle	70 (163)
- ^{1} Playing statistics correct to the end of 1984.

Jeffrey "Jeff" Cassidy (born 27 September 1956) is a former Australian rules footballer who played with Geelong in the Victorian Football League (VFL).

Cassidy was a utility, who struggled with injuries during his time at Geelong, particularly with his leg muscles.

He joined East Fremantle in 1981, having previously played with the West Australian Football League club briefly in 1977. Before he retired in 1984, Cassidy would top the goal-kicking for East Fremantle twice.
