= Al Mantello =

Italian-Australian rules footballer (1934–2021)

Personal information
- Full name: Albert Joseph Mantello
- Born: 30 April 1934
- Died: 26 September 2021 (aged 87)
- Original team: North Melbourne Thirds
- Height: 180 cm (5 ft 11 in)
- Weight: 91 kg (201 lb)

Playing career^{1}
Years	Club	Games (Goals)
1954–1962	North Melbourne	107 (25)
- ^{1} Playing statistics correct to the end of 1962.

Albert Joseph Mantello (30 April 1934 – 26 September 2021) was a former Italian-Australian rules footballer who played for North Melbourne in the Victorian Football League (VFL).

A strongly built and physical footballer, Mantello usually played as either a half back flanker or centreman. He captained North Melbourne in 1960 and represented Victoria in an interstate match in 1961.

Albert Mantello was inducted into the North Melbourne Hall Of Fame in 2009 alongside club greats Denis Pagan and Wayne Carey.
