= Fitzroy Bulldogs =

Names
- Full name: Fitzroy Football Club
- Nickname: Bulldogs

Club details
- Founded: 3 October 1989
- Dissolved: 23 October 1989
- Colours: Red; Blue; Gold
- Competition: Victorian Football League
- President: Leon Wiegard
- Ground: Princes Park
- Training ground: Western Oval

Uniforms
Prototype

The Fitzroy Bulldogs was a proposed Australian rules football club which was to have formed from the merger between the Fitzroy Lions and the Footscray Bulldogs, and was to have competed in the Victorian Football League^{Note 1} from 1990. The merger was arranged in October 1989 to avert the imminent financial collapse of the Footscray Football Club, but it was abandoned within three weeks of its announcement after Footscray supporters raised almost A$2 million (equivalent to $4,756,655 in 2022) and secured sponsorship and funding to ensure their club's solvency and viability into the future.

== Background ==
Until the 1980s, the Victorian Football League was one of seven nominally equivalent top-level state-based Australian rules football competitions in Australia that were administered at a national level by the National Football League. However, the higher population and greater money available in Melbourne, the birthplace of the code, meant the VFL was the de facto highest level of competition in Australia, with the ability to attract the strongest players from interstate. Throughout the 1980s, the VFL began to expand outside Victoria: the league had looked to establish a new club in Sydney in 1982 before South Melbourne elected to relocate there instead (becoming the Sydney Swans), and newly established clubs based in Perth (the West Coast Eagles) and south-eastern Queensland (the Brisbane Bears) were admitted to the league in 1987. Thus, the VFL was becoming a national competition.

At the same time, the rising cost of players and administration was severely affecting the weaker clubs as the league expanded around them. Seven of Melbourne's eleven VFL clubs faced financial ruin at different times during the 1980s: it was financial pressures that drove South Melbourne to relocate to Sydney in 1982; more than $1,000,000 of debt and the effect of losing the Junction Oval as a home ground almost drove Fitzroy to relocate to Brisbane, merge with Melbourne, or fold at the end of 1986; while St Kilda, Footscray and Richmond all struggled with extensive debts. Many clubs were saved from bankruptcy only by the dividends they received from the $4,000,000 licence fees charged to Brisbane and West Coast, as well as the $4,000,000 earned when the Sydney Swans were sold to Dr Geoffrey Edelsten in 1985, but these cash injections provided only temporary relief, and they did nothing to address the ailing long-term viability of the clubs.

== Footscray's decline ==
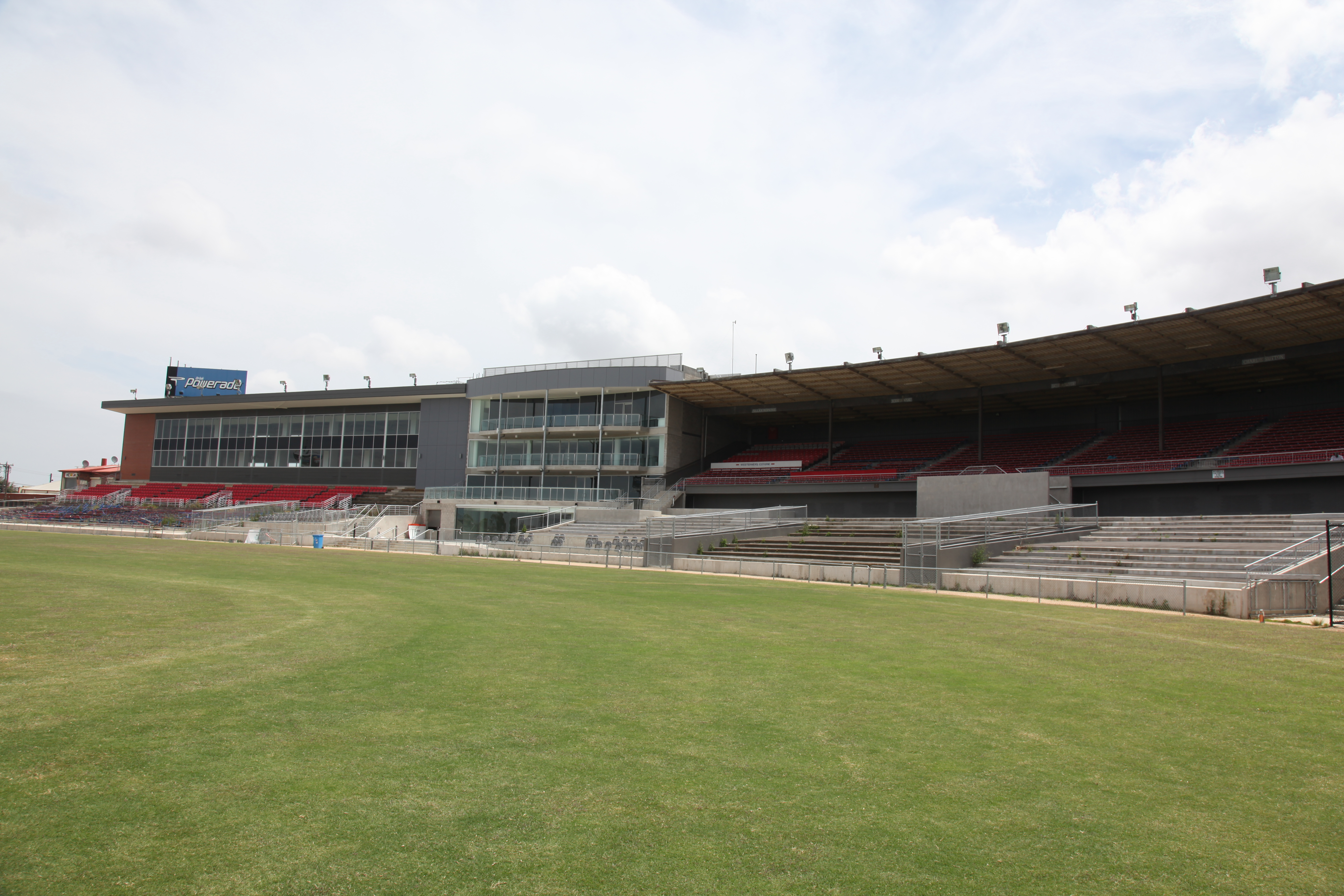
Footscray's off-field position in the 1980s was hindered by deteriorating facilities at the Western Oval.

The Footscray Football Club had been in financial trouble throughout the 1980s, and it had faced pressure to stay afloat, leading them to investigate several options, including relocation to Brisbane as early as 1982.

By 1989, its financial position was terminal. The club was more than $2,000,000 in debt, and it was forecast to post a $800,000 operating loss in 1989. The club's location in Melbourne's working-class inner western suburbs and the poor quality of facilities at its home ground at the Western Oval were hindering its ability to gain corporate support; in fact, the ground's grandstand had been declared a fire hazard in 1988, and the club was already facing pressure to play its games elsewhere. A couple of decades of generally mediocre on-field performances were also contributing to declining attendances, and finishing second-last on the ladder in 1989 had accelerated the decline.

The VFL had been concerned about Footscray's financial position throughout the year, and required that the club prove its ongoing viability to hold its place in the league; it was widely recognised that the club needed a big off-field change to survive. The Footscray Council had offered the club a package worth more than $1,600,000, which included a $600,000 direct cash injection, $400,000 to upgrade facilities at Western Oval, and its assistance to secure $600,000 in sponsorships, but the league rejected this as another temporary solution which failed to address the root cause of its problems.

Seeing few other options, Footscray president Nick Columb, who had been involved with the club for about ten years but had been elected president only in March 1989, began negotiations for a merger. He had approached all of the league's struggling clubs, eliciting some interest from St Kilda and no interest from North Melbourne and Richmond, but it was discussions with the Fitzroy Football Club which provided the strongest case. Although Fitzroy's financial position had improved since it almost relocated to Brisbane in 1987, its position was still weak, with around $600,000 of debts, and while its immediate solvency was secure, its long-term viability was not, meaning that Fitzroy president Leon Wiegard was willing to merge.

The clubs and the VFL executive, under CEO Ross Oakley, agreed to terms for a merger, and the merger plan was announced to the public on 3 October 1989, three days after the 1989 grand final; Footscray's licence to compete in the VFL was immediately terminated. The negotiations were carried out secretly, and it was not until the plans were leaked on 2 October by former Footscray general manager Dennis Galimberti, who learned of the plans at the club's best and fairest dinner and later became prominent in the campaign against the merger, that the merger became public knowledge.

It is believed that, if the merger had not been announced, the VFL would have appointed an administrator within the week, Footscray would have been placed into liquidation, and the club would have folded.

== Merger arrangements ==
A set of proposed arrangements for the merger was negotiated with the VFL executive, which would have given the merged club a strong starting position for the future. The key points of the proposal were:

- The club would be known as the Fitzroy Football Club, with the team known as the Fitzroy Bulldogs.
- The club would wear Fitzroy's colours: red, blue and gold.
- Home games would be played at Princes Park in the inner northern suburb of North Carlton, relatively near to Fitzroy. The ground would be shared between Carlton and Fitzroy (Hawthorn, which had also played there since 1974, was already beginning moves to transition its home to VFL Park).
- The club would train at Western Oval, Footscray's home ground.
- The VFL would clear Footscray's and Fitzroy's existing debts, which combined to $3,400,000: to do this, it would use the regular dividends and allocations which would otherwise have gone to a stand-alone Footscray club over the next few years until the debt was repaid. This gave the merged club the opportunity to begin its existence debt-free.
- The new club board would comprise four members of the former Fitzroy board and four members of the former Footscray board. It would be chaired by Fitzroy president Leon Wiegard, while Footscray president Nick Columb would not be involved.
- The club could compile its 58-man playing list for 1990 from any players currently on the Footscray and Fitzroy lists; to this end, the club would be permitted to exceed the league's salary cap by whatever amount was necessary in 1990 and 1991 to honour existing contracts.
- The club would not participate in the 1989 VFL Draft.
- The 26 players not retained by the merged club would enter a dispersal draft: the first eight selections would go to the struggling Brisbane Bears, and the remaining 11 clubs would receive one selection each in reverse ladder order. The seven players still not selected could then be signed or drafted under normal protocols.
- The club would operate two separate Under-19s teams, one at Fitzroy and one at Footscray, for three seasons to avoid disadvantaging players already in the existing clubs' junior systems, before operating a single Under-19s team afterwards.
- The club would establish a junior development academy at Western Oval.

Had the merger gone ahead, these arrangements could still have been amended, as they needed to be approved by a three-quarters majority of the remaining 12 clubs. When the merger was averted, the vote was cancelled.

== Response ==
The announcement was met with strong anger from Footscray fans. While the merged club was to retain the Bulldogs nickname, the other three areas which most clearly defined the club's identity – its name, colours and home ground – would have come from Fitzroy. For this reason, the merger was seen by Footscray fans as a takeover by Fitzroy. Class warfare became a very strong theme in the response from Footscray fans, with the merger being portrayed as a club from the working-class western suburbs being taken over by the club from the "silvertail" inner suburbs. The secretive nature of the merger negotiations, and the lack of consultation with members, also drove much of the anger from fans. The Essendon Football Club, which was the next-most western club remaining in the league, received inquiries from many Footscray fans who planned to switch allegiance to the Bombers if the merger went ahead.

The response from Fitzroy fans, who had endured merger and relocation discussions only three years earlier, was far less negative than the response from Footscray fans, in large part because this merger preserved more of Fitzroy's identity and did not require a relocation. Many Fitzroy players, on the other hand, were upset by the merger proposal because the playing group would be broken up by the merger, and many fringe players were fearful for their jobs. Players commented that they had almost unanimously favoured relocation to Brisbane over a merger with Melbourne in 1987 for exactly this reason.

The merger was a blow to football representation in the inner western suburbs, as the region had already seen one of its two Victorian Football Association clubs, Yarraville, drop out of the competition and go into recess before the start of 1984, and Sunshine had withdrawn from the VFA during the 1989 season, its future still uncertain. There was some discussion that a new Footscray Football Club, or a wider western suburban club in partnership with Sunshine, could be established in the VFA to retain a high level senior football club in the region, with the possibility that it could form an informal developmental partnership with the Fitzroy Bulldogs similar to those enjoyed between Geelong and Geelong West or Collingwood and Preston, but these discussions progressed no further before the merger was abandoned.

As far as the football world was concerned, the merger was all but finalised. Newspapers began running predictions of the Fitzroy Bulldogs' on-field prospects for 1990, and plaques bearing Footscray's and Fitzroy's logos were taken down from the façade at VFL Park.

== Footscray Fightback campaign ==
Footscray supporters immediately began a legal response against the merger, and the Save the Dogs Committee, led by local solicitor Peter Gordon, and the Footscray Fightback Foundation were established. A legal loophole allowed for a club member to protest the decision if members hadn't been consulted ahead of time; and so, on 6 October, rank-and-file Footscray member Irene Chatfield won a stay of proceedings against the merger in the Supreme Court of Victoria, putting her personal assets (including superannuation, life insurance and a car) at risk as collateral against court costs. Under the stay, the club needed to raise $1,500,000 (later increased to $1,800,000) and prove its viability by 25 October to have its VFL licence restored.

The Save the Dogs committee set about raising the necessary funds through donations from the public and seeking corporate sponsorship. The first grassroots fundraising event was a rally at the Western Oval on Sunday 8 October, which drew a crowd of 10,000 fans keen to save the club, and a total of $450,000 in donations was raised on that day alone. An extensive door-knocking and tin-rattling campaign throughout the western suburbs on the following weekend raised $160,000. A legends match was held between a team of former Footscray players and a team of former Collingwood players on Sunday 22 October at Skinner Reserve, which drew a large crowd of 8,000 to see Footscray 11.5 (71) d. Collingwood 9.11 (65).

As fundraising was going on, Footscray administrators continued preparations for the 1990 season on the basis that the merger would be averted, and assistant coach and former player Terry Wheeler was appointed senior coach on 8 October. Wheeler was critical of outgoing senior coach Mick Malthouse, who had left the club before the merger was announced, for not doing enough to motivate players and the club when it was known that the off-field position looked bleak in the latter part of the 1989 season.

By 23 October, Footscray had raised the money and resources it needed to regain its VFL licence. Its fundraising efforts raised $1,100,000, it had consolidated its support from the local council, developed a business plan to return to delivering profits within three years, and had most significantly secured a three-year sponsorship deal worth between $1,000,000–1,500,000 with chemical giant I.C.I., which had a long history of operations in Melbourne's west and was a major employer in the area. Footscray's VFL licence was restored, and both Footscray and Fitzroy continued as separate entities into the 1990 season.

In an extraordinary general meeting on 30 October, the entire board which had been involved in the merger stepped down. Peter Gordon was elected president of the club after his strong work as part of the Save the Dogs Committee. Peter Welsh, Ken Greenwood, Bob Moodie and Ron Coleman were elected to the board.

== Aftermath ==
Since 1990, Footscray (known as the Western Bulldogs since 1997) has remained viable. For a period through the early 1990s, the club worked aggressively to improve the Western Oval and attract more sporting clubs to the venue, and in 1991/92, the club was part-owner of the Melbourne Monarchs baseball club, which played at Western Oval, and it investigated establishing a rugby league club at Western Oval to become the NSWRL's first Melbourne-based club. The club ceased playing home games at the Western Oval in 1997, moving to Princes Park from the same year and then Docklands Stadium in 2000 as part of the league's grounds rationalisation, retaining the venue as its training and administrative base, and then later for its reserves and women's teams.

Gordon served as president until 1996, and returned in 2012 for a second stint as president: this included the club's second premiership in 2016, also the club's first premiership since 1954. Although Footscray/Western Bulldogs has never reached the point where it could be called a wealthy club, it has not since faced financial difficulties anywhere as dire as those it faced in 1989.

On the other hand, Fitzroy was disappointed by the collapse of the merger; it saw the merger, and particularly the offer for its debts to be cleared by the VFL, as one of its best opportunities to secure a future in Melbourne. It had no plan for long-term stand-alone viability in Melbourne, and within seven years the club's condition had dwindled to terminal. The club tried selling home games to Hobart and Canberra, but the ventures were neither financially successful nor supported by the AFL Commission. Ironically, in 1994, Fitzroy moved its permanent home playing base from Princes Park to the Western Oval.

Between 1994 and 1996, the club attempted to broker mergers with Melbourne and North Melbourne to stay in Victoria, but those failed. After the club went into administration in 1996, its AFL playing operations were taken over by the Brisbane Bears, who were rebranded as the Lions. The Fitzroy Football Club came out of administration in 1998, and has competed in its own right in the Victorian Amateur Football Association since 2009.

Although the clubs' boards were united in their decision to merge, it is far from certain that the merger would have been harmonious. Footscray had a larger and stronger supporter base than Fitzroy, and some prominent opponents of the merger had a contingency plan to encourage Footscray fans to purchase Fitzroy Bulldogs memberships in such high numbers that a voting majority of members could elect a sympathetic board to move the club back to Footscray and restore the club's red, white and blue colours.

The effect of the failed Fitzroy Bulldogs merger on the Sunshine Football Club was more immediate: with Footscray surviving and enjoying renewed support from local businesses and fans in the western suburbs, Sunshine lost any realistic prospect of achieving the local support it needed to regain its place in the VFA for 1990. Two days after the merger collapsed, Sunshine surrendered its VFA licence and folded.

Historically, the merger has sometimes been viewed cynically as an attempt by the VFL to rationalise the number of Victorian clubs and grounds to facilitate the nationalisation of the league, and Peter Gordon once described the merger as an arranged marriage orchestrated by the VFL. Whether or not that was the case, Fitzroy is the only one of the eleven Victorian clubs from 1989 which no longer competes in the AFL competition (they are now competing in the Victorian Amateur Football Association).

The VFL went on to change its name to the Australian Football League from the 1990 season, becoming the de jure national administrative body for the sport in 1995 when the National Football League ceased operations.

== Footnotes ==
1. The Victorian Football League (VFL) was renamed the Australian Football League (AFL) between the 1989 and 1990 seasons. For clarity, the league is referred to as the VFL throughout this article.
