= Gordon Collis =

Australian rules footballer, born 1940

Personal information
- Full name: Gordon Donald Collis
- Born: 6 November 1940 (age 85)
- Original team: Healesville
- Height: 187 cm (6 ft 2 in)
- Weight: 83 kg (183 lb)
- Position: Centre half-back

Playing career^{1}
Years	Club	Games (Goals)
1961–1967	Carlton	95 (40)
- ^{1} Playing statistics correct to the end of 1967.

Career highlights
- 1964 Brownlow Medal

Gordon Donald Collis (born 6 November 1940) is a former Australian rules footballer in the Victorian Football League.

Recruited from Healesville, Collis played less than 100 games of VFL football, but his place in history is assured as a winner of one of the game's highest honours – the Brownlow Medal.

Collis won the medal in 1964 with 27 votes, although the Carlton Football Club had its worst finish in the VFL at the time, ending the season in 10th position.

Wearing number 17 for the Blues between 1961 and 1967 (playing 95 games and booting 40 goals), the red-haired Collis played primarily at centre half-back before injuries forced his retirement.

Collis credited his optician with the Brownlow win, as in 1963 he struggled to see the ball and "All the other chaps would be coming down as I started to go up." This was rectified with contact lenses, resulting in a much improved 1964. Collis became Carlton's second Medallist in four years, following John James who won in 1961.
