= Fitzroy Football Club =

Australian rules football club

Names
- Full name: Fitzroy Football Club (incorporating the Fitzroy Reds)
- Nickname(s): Roys, Roy Boys, Reds, Roy Girls
- Former nickname(s): Maroons (1883–1938); Gorillas (1938–1957); Lions (1957–1996)

Club details
- Founded: 26 September 1883; 143 years ago (Note: The AFL club operations were merged with the Brisbane Bears in 1996, but Fitzroy merged with Fitzroy Reds, and resumed playing operations in 2009 in the Victorian Amateur Football Association.)
- Colours: Red; Blue; Yellow
- Competition: VAFA: Premier; VAFAW: Premier B
- President: David Leydon
- Coach: VAFA: Travis Ronaldson; VAFAW: Nathan Jumeau
- Captain(s): VAFA: Julian Turner; VAFAW: Steph Pitt
- Premierships: VFA (1): 1895; VFL/AFL (8): 1898; 1899; 1904; 1905; 1913; 1916; 1922; 1944; VAFA (1): 2018
- Ground: Brunswick Street Oval

Uniforms
Home	Away	Traditional

Other information
- Official website: fitzroyfc.com.au

The Fitzroy Football Club is an Australian rules football club currently competing in the Victorian Amateur Football Association (VAFA). Formed in 1883 to represent the inner-Melbourne municipality of Fitzroy, the club is based at the W. T. Peterson Community Oval in Fitzroy North. The club nickname is the Roys, having previously been the Maroons (until 1938), Gorillas (1938–1957) and Lions (1957–1996). Since 1975, the club's colours have been red, blue and gold.

Fitzroy was established as a member of the Victorian Football Association (VFA), winning one premiership in that competition. In 1897, it was a foundation member of the breakaway Victorian Football League (VFL), the highest senior professional league in Victoria and later, as the Australian Football League (AFL), in Australia. Fitzroy was one of the most successful clubs over the league's first three decades, contesting 19 finals series and winning a league-high seven premierships in that time. However, success was limited thereafter, and its last seventy years yielded only one premiership from eleven finals appearances. The club suffered persistent financial losses through the 1980s and 1990s, culminating in being placed into administration in 1996, and its AFL operations were merged into those of the Brisbane Bears, who became the Brisbane Lions from 1997.

Fitzroy came out of administration in 1998, and formed sponsor partnerships with local amateur clubs over the next ten years. Since 2009, the club has competed in the VAFA in its own right, and as of 2025 plays in the Premier B division.

== History ==
=== Early years ===
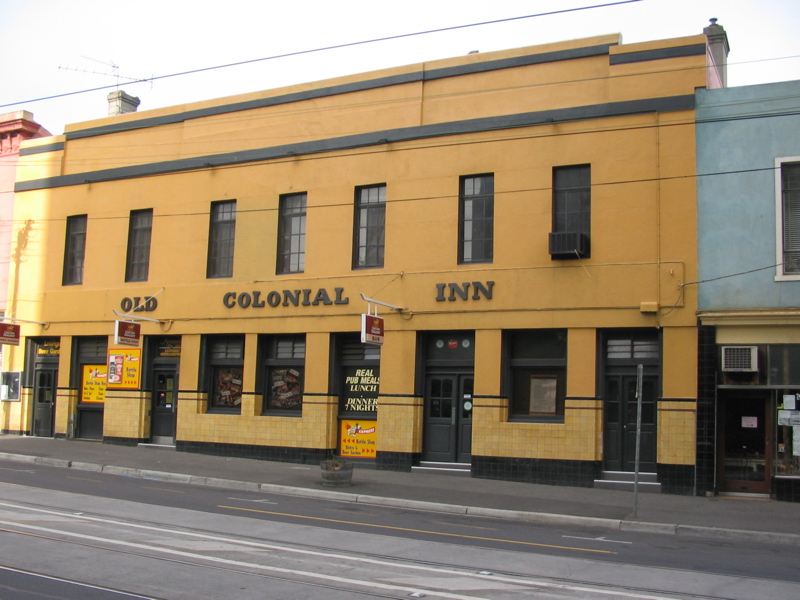
Brunswick Hotel (now trading as the Old Colonial Inn), where the club was founded in 1883

The Fitzroy Football Club was formed at a meeting at the Brunswick Hotel, Fitzroy on 26 September 1883, at a time when Melbourne's population was rapidly increasing. The Victorian Football Association (VFA) made changes to their rules, allowing Fitzroy to join as the seventh club in 1884, playing in the maroon and blue colours of the local Normanby Junior Football Club.

=== VFA ===
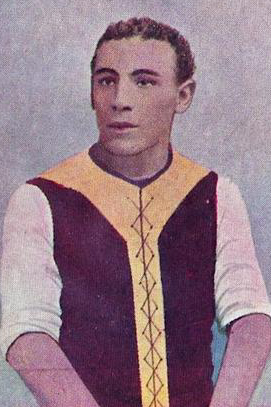
In 1895 Tom Banks captained Fitzroy to its first and only VFA premiership. He was also one of the first footballers of African descent to play in the VFL.

They quickly became one of the most successful clubs, drawing large crowds to their home at the Brunswick Street Oval in Edinburgh Gardens, and consistently in the top four and winning the VFA premiership in 1895.

Fitzroy's season-by-season records throughout its thirteen seasons at VFA level are given below. (Under VFA rules at the time, only goals were counted to the total team score).

Season	Played	Won	Lost	Drawn	For	Against
1884	16	7	8	1	27	29
1885	19	8	8	3	51	51
1886	20	10	8	2	66	44
1887	20	11	4	5	71	56
1888	18	6	10	2	64	71
1889	20	10	8	2	86	66
1890	18	11	6	1	44	51
1891	19	12	5	2	70	70
1892	21	15	4	2	141	63
1893	21	11	8	2	114	84
1894	18	10	6	2	75	60
1895	18	12	1	5	77	47
1896	18	12	6	0	89	59
Total	254	140	84	30	1097	787

=== VFL ===
Chart of yearly ladder positions for Fitzroy in VFL/AFL

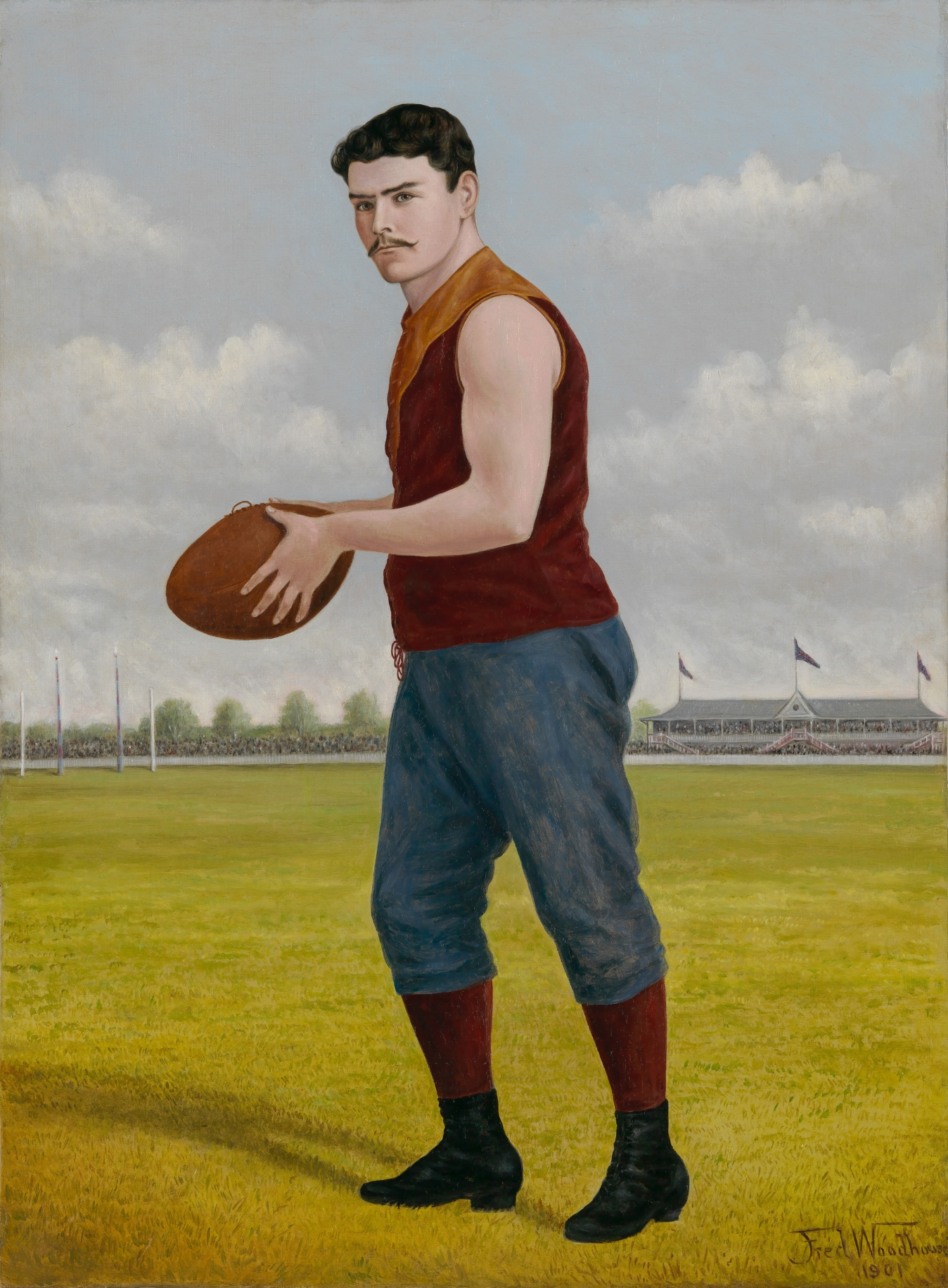
1901 portrait of Geoff Moriarty, who played in two VFL premierships for Fitzroy before going on to become the club's first official coach in 1911. His son Jack also played for Fitzroy.

In 1897, Fitzroy were one of the eight clubs who broke away from the VFA to form the Victorian Football League (VFL).

Despite winning only four games and finishing sixth in the first season, the Maroons, as they were then known, won the premiership the following year, winning the VFL's first "Grand Final" against Essendon. Fitzroy was the most successful club in the first 10 years of the VFL, winning four premierships and finishing runners-up on three occasions. Despite internal problems after the 1906 season which led to the players and set the club back for several seasons, the 1913 team won the flag after winning 16 of 18 matches in the home-and-away season, earning the nickname "Unbeatables". In contrast, the 1916 Fitzroy team only won 2 home-and-away matches and finished last in a competition reduced by the effects of World War I to four teams. All four teams qualified for the finals, and Fitzroy won their next three games to win one of the strangest VFL premierships; this is the first and only time a club that finished last on the ladder won the premiership in the same year.

=== Between the wars ===
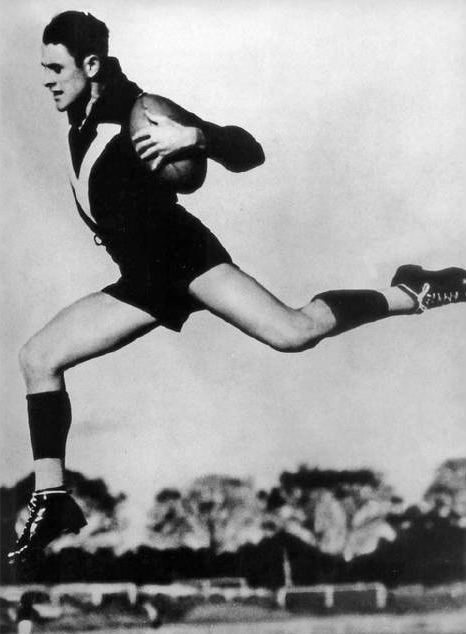
Haydn Bunton Sr., three-time Brownlow Medal winner

The Maroons won their seventh premiership in 1922, a season which included four very rough games against eventual runners-up Collingwood. However, after this their fortunes waned, and they did not make the finals at all from 1925 to 1942. During this time, highlights for the club were individual achievements of their players, especially Haydn Bunton Sr. Originally a source of controversy, lured to Fitzroy with an illegal £222 payment, and subsequently not allowed to play in the 1930 season, Bunton became one of the game's greatest players, winning three Brownlow Medals while at Fitzroy. Brownlow Medals were also won by Wilfred Smallhorn and Dinny Ryan, while Jack Moriarty set many goalkicking records. It was during this time that the Maroons became known as the Gorillas.

=== Post-war ===
Football was less affected by World War II than it had been in 1916, and by 1944 was starting to return to its normal level. It was in this year, under captain-coach Fred Hughson, that the Gorillas won their eighth VFL flag against Richmond in front of a capacity crowd at Junction Oval.

However, it was also to be their last senior premiership, as the club, which became known as the Lions in 1957, entered one of the least successful periods any VFL/AFL club has had. The club finished in the bottom three 11 times in the 1960s and 1970s, including three wooden spoons in four years between 1963 and 1966. The club won only a single game throughout 1963 and 1964 – known as the Miracle Match when it defeated eventual premiers Geelong in Round 10, 1963 – but its 1964 season was winless, and as of 2023 stands as the only winless season by any club in the men's competition since 1950. Nevertheless, the club continued to produce great individual players over this period, including Brownlow Medallists Allan Ruthven and Kevin Murray.

By the mid-1960s, Fitzroy's traditional home ground, the Brunswick Street Oval was in a state of disrepair. However, the ground managers were the Fitzroy Cricket Club. The Football Club had to pay the Cricket Club to use the ground. Despite pressure from the Lions and other VFL clubs, the Cricket Club refused to make the needed upgrades. The Fitzroy City Council, despite repeated requests from the Football Club, also refused to help, even rejecting the idea of a $400,000 loan to Fitzroy Football Club, and a 40-year lease of the ground so they could make some repairs.

The football club put forward various ideas to try and change the situation, including the amalgamation of the Football and Cricket Clubs to form one club as in the manner of the Carlton Social Club. The Cricket Club held the liquor licence and managed the ground, and it was thought that a combined club could more efficiently manage funds. With a stake in the ground, the football club could have better agitated for improvements to the ground by sourcing funds from other organisations such as the VFL. However, the Cricket Club rejected the idea outright. The club also considered leaving Brunswick Street, and in 1962 it appealed to the Preston Council for a 40-year lease of the Preston City Oval, which was rejected.

It was only when the Council Health Officer condemned the change rooms at the Brunswick Street Oval in 1966 and negotiations broke down between the council, (who offered a 21-year lease) and the football club, that the Fitzroy Football Club was forced to find another ground. They had held discussions with the Northcote and Preston VFA clubs and also had approached the Heidelberg Council about relocating to the Olympic Training Ground. From 1967 to 1969, the club moved their home games to Carlton's Princes Park while keeping their training and administration at the Brunswick Street Oval. Further problems with the Cricket Club and the high cost of rent imposed by Carlton saw Fitzroy move to the Junction Oval in 1970, where they had a short-lived promising start to the decade. This was followed by a night premiership win in 1978 and a record-breaking match in which it scored a then-record score of 36.22 (238) and greatest winning margin of 190 points against Melbourne in 1979. However, Fitzroy's most significant post-war success was in the early '80s, when the Lions made the finals four times, culminating in a preliminary final appearance in 1986. This success occurred under the coaching of Robert Walls and David Parkin, with players such as 1981 Brownlow Medallist Bernie Quinlan, Ron Alexander, Garry Wilson, Gary Pert and Paul Roos.

The club was evicted from Junction Oval at the end of 1984 after a fifteen-year tenure, and entered another nomadic period of existence. It played its home games at Victoria Park, sharing it with Collingwood in 1985 and 1986, then at Princes Park, sharing it with Carlton from 1987 until 1993; In 1994, Fitzroy then began playing its home matches at the Western Oval, sharing the venue with Footscray, as it sought a better financial arrangement than it had received at its previous home Princes Park. and over the same time it moved through several different training and administrative bases, spending time first at the Northcote Park in Northcote, then later Lake Oval in South Melbourne and Bulleen Park in Bulleen.

=== Fitzroy's time in the AFL ends ===
Talk of the death of the club due to financial troubles occurred as early as 1986. In 1989 the directors agreed to amalgamation with equally troubled Footscray to form the Fitzroy Bulldogs, but a fightback from Footscray supporters, in which almost two million dollars was raised in three weeks, averted the merger. At other times, joining with Melbourne or relocating to Brisbane was suggested. As well as trying several fund-raising ventures, the Lions experimented with playing four home matches in Tasmania in 1991 and 1992 to avoid a takeover bid by the Brisbane Bears but lost money in the process. In 1994, the club moved its home matches to Western Oval (later Whitten Oval), its fourth match-day home ground in 10 years. Amid uncertainties about the financial future of the club, its on-field performances continued to deteriorate, to the point where the Lions finished last by a long way in 1995 and 1996, winning just three matches in those seasons combined. With financial and on–field performance issues plaguing the club and with Port Adelaide due to enter the AFL in 1997 requiring a team to either merge or fold to make way for them, the writing for Fitzroy was on the wall.

On 28 June 1996, the Nauru Insurance Company, a creditor of the Fitzroy Football Club, appointed Michael Brennan to administer the affairs of the Fitzroy Football Club to ensure a loan of A$1.25 million was to be repaid. During the 1996 season, there were fears that the club would collapse in mid-season due to its lack of cash. This was averted when the AFL guaranteed funds to Fitzroy to allow the club to continue in the competition for the remainder of 1996.

Fitzroy had been in merger discussions with several teams, but discussions were most advanced with North Melbourne. By the beginning of July 1996, the club had agreed to arrangements to become the North Fitzroy Kangaroos Football Club. Negotiations for elements such as club colours, guernsey and song were to be settled by the morning of 4 July by the Fitzroy board.

However, later that afternoon the administrator of Fitzroy, who had been appointed to temporarily replace the Fitzroy board, agreed to merge the club's AFL operations with the Brisbane Bears, with the agreement of the AFL commission and a majority vote of the AFL's constituent clubs. The Brisbane Bears would then change their name to Brisbane Bears-Fitzroy Football Club (trading as Brisbane Lions), playing at The Gabba in the Brisbane suburb of Woolloongabba. The arrangement ensured that all creditors were repaid, at least eight Fitzroy players were to be selected by the Brisbane Lions before the 1996 National Draft and three Fitzroy representatives were to be on Brisbane's 11-member board. None of the three Fitzroy representatives, Laurie Serafini, David Lucas and Ken Levy, chosen to serve on Brisbane's board, were Fitzroy directors at that time.

Those involved have different opinions on why the merger with North Melbourne was rejected, despite negotiations being so far advanced and indeed concluded on the morning of 4 July. The other AFL club presidents rejected the North Melbourne-Fitzroy merger by a vote of 14–1. It was commonly thought, and claimed by then Richmond president Leon Daphne, that an all-Victorian merge would create a superteam with on-field and off-field strength out of all proportion to the rest of the league. Not only would North Melbourne go on to win the 1996 premiership, the merged team had proposed to take a 50-player senior list into the 1997 season. This is compared with the Brisbane Lions bid, which proposed a 44-player senior list for 1997, and did not have the potential off-field strength of an all-Victorian merge. Then North Melbourne CEO Greg Miller has accused the AFL of contriving the two bids in this manner to manufacture a result which would fulfil its strategic direction to strengthen the game in Queensland. Additionally, then North Melbourne vice-president Peter de Rauch believes that his club's decision not to include Fitzroy president Dyson Hore-Lacy on the board of the merged club was a catalyst for the temporary unravelling of negotiations between the clubs, allowing the appointment of the administrator and keeping the Brisbane Bears involved in negotiations.

During this time, senior coach Mick Nunan resigned after Fitzroy's game against Essendon on 6 July and was replaced by Alan McConnell for his second stint in just twelve months. With eight rounds to go until the end of the season, Fitzroy's on field performances continued to deteriorate to the point where the team was thrashed week in, week out. In Round 21, 48,884 people attended the Melbourne Cricket Ground (MCG) on 25 August 1996 for Fitzroy's last ever game in Melbourne as part of the AFL competition. They witnessed the Lions being defeated by 151 points, the second greatest loss in the club's history: Richmond 28.19 (187) defeated Fitzroy 5.6 (36). The club played its final VFL/AFL game the following week on 1 September against Fremantle at Subiaco Oval, losing by 86 points.

=== Post-AFL ===
On-field

The original Fitzroy Football Club came out of administration after its AFL operations were absorbed by Brisbane, in late 1998. The shareholders voted to continue the club, and Fitzroy then developed a partnership with the Coburg Lions in the VFL. Coburg were known as the Coburg-Fitzroy Lions for just over a season (from August 1999 until the end of 2000). However, when Coburg entered into an affiliation with the AFL's Richmond Football Club, the Fitzroy connection was abandoned.

Fitzroy began a sponsorship arrangement with the Fitzroy Reds (formerly University Reds) in the Victorian Amateur Football Association and the Fitzroy Junior Football Club in the Yarra Junior Football League. Both wear the old Fitzroy jumper, play the old theme song, and play from Brunswick Street Oval in the heart of Fitzroy. In December 2008, at the instigation of the then Fitzroy (University) Reds president Craig Little, the University Reds Football Club (known as the 'Fitzroy' Reds from 1997) transferred all its assets to the Fitzroy Football Club (formed 1883). The university (Fitzroy) Reds terminated its membership of the VAFA and was wound up as an incorporated company and football club. By special dispensation from the VAFA, the Fitzroy Football Club then replaced the Fitzroy [University] Reds in D1 of the VAFA from the 2009 season, fielding a senior and reserves side, as well as two Under-19 sides and a Club 18 side. All the teams were made up mainly of Fitzroy Reds personnel. Dyson Hore-Lacy, chairman of Fitzroy in the AFL in 1996, automatically became chairman of the Club in the VAFA.

Fitzroy lost in the VAFA D1 Grand Final to Rupertswood in 2009, but as a Grand Finalist was promoted to C-Grade for the 2010 season. At the beginning of the 2011 season, Fitzroy appointed Tim Bell as their new senior coach following the resignation of Simon Taylor. Tim Bell resigned for personal reasons at the end of 2011 and assistant coach Michael Pickering, a former AFL player with the Richmond and Melbourne Football Clubs was appointed as coach for the 2012 season. Having reached the Premier C Grand Final at the end of 2012 season, Fitzroy was promoted to Premier B for season 2013 which coincided with the club's 130th birthday.

In 2015 the club initiated in a partnership with the Australian Catholic University to start fielding a women's team in the VWFL under the name of Fitzroy-ACU. They played their debut season in the same year. The interest grew after the first year of women's Fitzroy footy, growing numbers within the women's league. This enabled the club to enter another women's team into the VWFL, in the North West division. Both teams were hoping to make finals in 2016.

In 2018, Fitzroy won both the VAFA Premier C and the VAFA Premier C reserves grand finals.

== Relationship with the Brisbane Lions ==
Fitzroy Football Club improved its relationship with the Brisbane Lions in the ten years from 1999 to 2009. Brisbane have used the letters BBFFC printed below the back of the neck of the club's guernseys from 2002 to reflect the members vote to change their club's name to Brisbane Bears-Fitzroy Football Club (trading as Brisbane Lions) towards the end of 1996, in accordance with the Deed of Arrangement between Fitzroy Football Club and Brisbane Bears. In 2003, the then-Fitzroy Reds played the curtain-raiser at the MCG when the Brisbane Lions met the Collingwood Magpies in the AFL Heritage Round, and from 2008 Brisbane started wearing a version of Fitzroy's AFL guernsey with red instead of maroon in most matches played in Victoria, consistent with Fitzroy's most recent colours.

Relationships between Fitzroy and Brisbane were strained in late 2009, when Brisbane announced that it was adopting a new logo for season 2010 and beyond, which contravened Section 7.2 c) of the Deed of Arrangement between Fitzroy and Brisbane. The new logo, a lion's head facing forward, replaced the former Fitzroy logo of a passant lion with a football.

On 22 December 2009, Fitzroy lodged a Statement of Claim with the Supreme Court of Victoria, seeking an order that the Brisbane Lions be restrained from using as its logo, the new logo or any other logo other than 'the Fitzroy lion logo', in line with Brisbane's legal obligations as specified in the Deed of Arrangement, including their obligation to use the Fitzroy logo in perpetuity. On 15 July 2010, the two clubs reached a settlement, agreeing that the Fitzroy logo symbolically represents the historic deal between Brisbane and Fitzroy, and represents the Brisbane Lions in the AFL. Fitzroy agreed to a compromise whereby Brisbane would use both the old and new logos alongside each other in an official capacity for the next 14 years on all official club stationery and club publications, as well as the Lions' official website for the shorter period of seven years.

After pressure from both Brisbane and Fitzroy fans, Brisbane returned to using the old logo on its playing guernseys from 2015, but the current logo remains for corporate purposes.

Brisbane has since renewed and maintained ties with Fitzroy. They sponsor a male and female Fitzroy player each year, conduct coaching workshops for Fitzroy, frequently invite the Fitzroy juniors to form a guard of honour for Victorian games, have many Fitzroy past players and representatives as elected board members, and both celebrate their shared history.

In March 2026, the Brisbane Lions and Fitzroy announced a multi-year sponsorship arrangement which entailed Brisbane assisting in partially funding Fitzroy's local football programs. This also coincided with Brisbane unveiling a maroon, navy blue, and white Fitzroy heritage guernsey, which was worn in select games played in Victoria. The Fitzroy club song was also played in place of the Brisbane Lions club song at the round 3 game against St Kilda.

=== Sponsorship ===
Year	Major Sponsor	Shorts Sponsor	Bottom Sponsor
1978	IOOF	-	-
1979	Amco	-	-
1980–81	Nanda	-	-
1982	Cleanaway	-	-
1983–84	Darlington Investment Services	-	-
1985–86	James Hardie Spicers	-	-
1987–92	Quit	-	-
1993	Quit	Quit	-
1994	Quit	Solo	Rositas
1995	Quit	Sport Plus	Biztel
1996	Quit	Sport Plus	Clipsal

== Club honours ==
Premierships
Competition	Level	Wins	Years won
Victorian Football League/ Australian Football League	Seniors (1897–1996)	8	1898, 1899, 1904, 1905, 1913, 1916, 1922, 1944
Victorian Football League/ Australian Football League	Reserves (1919–1996)	3	1944, 1974, 1989
Victorian Football League/ Australian Football League	Under 19s (1946–1991)	2	1955, 1982
Victorian Football Association/ Victorian Football League	Seniors (1884–1896)	1	1895
Victorian Amateur Football Association	Seniors (2009–present)	1	2018 (Premier C)
Victorian Amateur Football Association	Reserves (2009–present)	3	2018 (Premier C), 2025 (Premier B), 2026 (Premier C)
Other titles and honours
Victorian Football League Night Series/ Australian Football League Night Series	Seniors	2	1959, 1978
Finishing positions
Victorian Football League/ Australian Football League	Minor premiership	4	1899, 1900, 1904, 1913
Victorian Football League/ Australian Football League	Grand Finalist	5	1900, 1903, 1906, 1917, 1923
Victorian Football League/ Australian Football League	Wooden spoons	7	1936, 1963, 1964, 1966, 1980, 1995, 1996
Victorian Amateur Football Association	Grand Finalist (Seniors)	3	2009 (D-Grade), 2012 (C-Grade), 2026 (Premier C)

=== Men's Team of the Century ===
Fitzroy Team of the Century
B:	Bill Stephen	Fred Hughson	Frank Curcio
HB:	Kevin Murray (c)	Paul Roos	Gary Pert
C:	Wilfred Smallhorn	John Murphy	Warwick Irwin
HF:	Owen Abrahams	Bernie Quinlan	Garry Wilson
F:	Allan Ruthven	Jack Moriarty	Norm Brown
Foll:	Alan Gale	Norm Johnstone	Haydn Bunton Sr.
Int:	Michael Conlan	Alastair Lynch	Harvey Merrigan
Int:	Richard Osborne	Percy Parratt	Percy Trotter
Coach:	Len Smith		

=== Women's Team of the Decade ===
Fitzroy Team of the Decade (women's)
B:	Luci Murphy	Claudia Bell	Jessica Hayes
HB:	Lucy Kerr	Lauren Atkinson	Sarah Lynas
C:	Gina Bennett	Lex Madden (vc)	Sunday Brisbane
HF:	Alice Batterton	Erin Gogerly	Alex Monacella
F:	Ruby Condon	Liz Olney	Hilary Collett
Foll:	Tash Ross-Harris	Gemma Minuz (c)	Teresa Zampaglione
Int:	Cass Blake (vc)	Mia Sutherland	Tess Young
Int:	Bianca Maes	Amelie Lay	Jaime Nelson

== Individual honours ==
=== Brownlow Medal winners ===
- Haydn Bunton Sr. – 1931, 1932, 1935
- Wilfred Smallhorn – 1933
- Dinny Ryan – 1936
- Allan Ruthven – 1950
- Kevin Murray – 1969
- Bernie Quinlan – 1981 (co-winner with Barry Round)

=== Coleman Medal for leading goalkicker ===
- Jimmy Freake – 1915
- Jack Moriarty – 1924
- Bernie Quinlan – 1983, 1984

=== Leigh Matthews Trophy winners ===
- Paul Roos (1986)

=== Best and fairest award winners ===
See Fitzroy FC honour roll for list of winners 1884–1996.

== Home venues ==
=== VFA ===
- 1884–1896 Brunswick Street Oval

=== VFL/AFL ===
- 1897–1966 Brunswick Street Oval
- 1952, 1991–1992 North Hobart Oval
- 1967–1969, 1987–1993 Princes Park
- 1970–1984 Junction Oval
- 1985–1986 Victoria Park
- 1995 Bruce Stadium
- 1994–1996 Whitten Oval

=== VAFA ===
- 2009–present Brunswick Street Oval

== Nicknames ==
=== Current nicknames ===
- The Lions (1957–present)
- The Redders (2009–present)
- The Roys (unknown–present)

=== Former nicknames ===
- The Maroons 1883–1938 (Fitzroy won eight premierships—1 VFA and 7 VFL—as the Maroons.)
- The Gorillas 1938–1957 (Fitzroy won one premiership as the Gorillas, their final one, in 1944.)

== VFL/AFL club records ==
Win–loss record:	Played: 1928	Won: 869, Lost: 1034, Drawn: 25
Highest score:	238 points (36.22)	v Melbourne FC, Round 17 28 July 1979
Lowest score:	6 points (1.0)	v Footscray FC, Round 5 23 May 1953
Greatest winning margin:	190 points	v Melbourne FC, Round 17 28 July 1979
Greatest losing margin:	157 points	v Hawthorn FC, Round 6 28 April 1991
Longest winning streak:	14 games	Round 10 16 July 1898 to Round 4 27 May 1899
Longest losing streak:	27 games	Round 11 20 July 1963 to Round 1 17 April 1965
Most games played:	333	Kevin Murray 1955–1964 & 1967–1974
Most goals scored:	626	Jack Moriarty 1924–1933
Most Best & Fairests:	9	Kevin Murray 1956, 1958, 1960–64, 1968–69

== Colours ==
Throughout its history, Fitzroy had multiple colours and kits, in conjunction with the changing of its nicknames.

1883–1907	1908–1941	1942–1955	1956–1973	1974–1996	2009–present

== Club song ==
The Fitzroy Football Club song is sung to the tune of "La Marseillaise", the French national anthem. Bill Stephen wrote the lyrics on an end-of-season football trip to Perth in 1952.

We are the boys from old Fitzroy,
we wear the colours maroon and blue,
we will always fight for victory,
and we'll always see it through,
win or lose, we do or die,
in defeat, we always try,
Fitzroy, Fitzroy,
the club we hold so dear,
premiers, we'll be this year!

== See also ==
- 1963 Miracle Match
- Brisbane Lions
- Fitzroy Bulldogs – for the proposed merger with the Footscray Football Club
- Fitzroy FC honour roll – for coaches, captains, leading goalkickers and team position.
- List of Fitzroy Football Club coaches
- List of Fitzroy Football Club players
- North Fitzroy Kangaroos – for the proposed merger with the North Melbourne Football Club
- Proposed VFL/AFL clubs – for all of the proposed mergers for Fitzroy

== Bibliography ==
- Lovett, M., ed. (2005). AFL Record Guide to Season 2005. Melbourne: AFL Publishing. ISBN 0-9580300-6-5.
- Holmesby, R.; Main, J. (2004). The Encyclopaedia of AFL Footballers: Every Brisbane and Fitzroy AFL Player Ever. Melbourne: BAS Publishing. ISBN 1-920910-09-3.
- Hutchinson, G.; Lang, R.; Ross, J. (1997). Roar of the Lions. Port Melbourne: Lothian Books. ISBN 0-85091-880-4.
- Muyt, A. (2006). Maroon and Blue: Recollections and Tales of the Fitzroy Football Club. Melbourne: The Vulgar Press. ISBN 0-9580795-9-5.
- Piesse, K. (1995). The Complete Guide to Australian Football. Pan Macmillan Australia. ISBN 0-330-35712-3.
- Sutherland, M.; Nicholson, R.; Murrihy, S. (1983). The First One Hundred Seasons Fitzroy Football Club 1883–1983. Melbourne: Fitzroy Football Club. ISBN 0-9591797-1-2.
- Fitzroy Football Club: Silver Jubilee, Fitzroy City Press, (Friday, 18 September 1908), p.3.
