= Australian Football Hall of Fame =

- Established: 1996
- Type: Sports hall of fame
- Website: www.afl.com.au/hall-of-fame

The Australian Football Hall of Fame was established in 1996, the centenary year of the Australian Football League (AFL), to recognise people who have made significant contributions to Australian rules football. Its scope includes players, coaches, umpires, administrators and media representatives from any level of the game since 1858.

The inaugural induction comprised 136 people, 12 of whom were named Legends. At the 2026 ceremony, six people were inducted and Bill Walker became the 34th person elevated to Legend status.

== Selection ==
=== Selection criteria ===
The selection committee considers a candidate's record, ability, integrity, sportsmanship and character. The number of games played, coached or umpired, or the length of service by an administrator or media representative, is a consideration but is not determinative. Candidates may come from any Australian state or territory and from any Australian football competition.

Players in men's competitions become eligible after they have been retired for at least five years, while coaches, umpires, administrators and media representatives become eligible after retirement. Since 2024, AFL Women's players may be considered one year after retirement.

The official selection criteria provide that:

- a candidate's outstanding service and overall contribution to Australian football are to be considered;
- a candidate's individual record, ability, integrity, sportsmanship and character may be considered;
- games played, coached or umpired, and years of service, are considerations but are not determinative;
- a player, coach, umpire, administrator or media representative involved at any level of Australian football may be eligible;
- candidates are assessed on their overall contribution to Australian football rather than on one aspect alone.

In 2010, the Hall of Fame charter was amended. The principal changes were:

- The maximum number of inductees in a year was reduced from eight to six. This change was reversed in 2018.
- The minimum number of inductees who had retired within the preceding 10 years was reduced from three to two. This requirement was removed in 2018.
- The requirement to induct at least one umpire, administrator or media representative each year was changed to at least one person from those categories every two years. In 2018, the retirement requirement for media representatives and administrators was removed.
- The selection committee was made independent of the AFL Commission, with the committee's recommendations requiring the commission's endorsement rather than approval.
- Selectors were appointed to an initial three-year term and could be reappointed for two further three-year terms, for a maximum of nine years.
- At least 25 per cent of the selection committee was required to reside outside Victoria.

=== Selection committee ===
In 2026, the selection committee was chaired by AFL Commission chair Craig Drummond. The other selectors were Graham Cornes, James Gallagher, Ross Glendinning, Debbie Lee, Karen Lyon, Andrew McLeod, Simon Madden, Alister Nicholson and Michael O'Loughlin, with Patrick Keane serving as secretary.

== Legends ==
The Legends category is reserved for inductees whose playing or coaching records are judged to have had a particularly significant positive impact on Australian football. It is the highest honour within the Hall of Fame and is restricted to players and coaches.

Although most Legends made their principal contributions in the VFL/AFL, the list also recognises careers centred in the SANFL, WAFL and Tasmanian competitions.

As of 2026, 34 people had been elevated to Legend status. This is numerically equivalent to approximately one Legend for every 393 players in VFL/AFL history (approximately 0.26%), although the distinction is rarer still when the broader history of Australian football—including leagues outside the VFL/AFL as well as coaches—are taken into account. Barry Cable was one of the 34 people elevated, but his Legend status was revoked in 2023.

The Hall of Fame charter limits Legends to a maximum of 10 per cent of all inductees and provides that only playing and coaching records may be considered for elevation.

Legends
Inductee	Year elevated	Games	Goals	Premierships		Highlights
Inductee	Year elevated	Games	Goals	Player	Coach	Highlights
Darrel Baldock	2006	352 senior club games: East Devonport (71); Latrobe (158); St Kilda (119); New Norfolk (4)	237 VFL goals: St Kilda (237)	5 premierships: VFL (1); St Kilda; 1. 1966; NWFU (4); Latrobe; 1. 1969; 2. 1970 (TSP); 3. 1971; 4. 1972	4 premierships: NWFU (4); Latrobe; 1. 1969; 2. 1970 (TSP); 3. 1971; 4. 1972	Representative honours: 2× All-Australian (1961, 1966); Victoria (10 games); Tasmania (15 games); League honours: 3× Wander Medal (1957, 1959, 1971); Club honours: St Kilda captain (1963–1968); 3× St Kilda best and fairest (1962, 1963, 1965); 4× St Kilda leading goalkicker (1962, 1963, 1964, 1965); Coaching record: St Kilda 1987–1989 (18–44–0)
Ron Barassi	1996	254 games: Melbourne (204); Carlton (50)	330 goals: Melbourne (295); Carlton (35)	6 premierships: VFL (6); Melbourne; 1. 1955; 2. 1956; 3. 1957; 4. 1959; 5. 1960; 6. 1964	4 premierships: VFL (4); Carlton; 1. 1968; 2. 1970; North Melbourne; 1. 1975; 2. 1977	Representative honours: 3× All-Australian (1956, 1958, 1961); Australia (4 games); Victoria (19 games); Club honours: Melbourne captain (1960–1964); 2× Melbourne best and fairest (1961, 1964); 2× Melbourne leading goalkicker (1958, 1959); Coaching record: Carlton 1965–1971 (99–47–1); North Melbourne 1973–1980 (129–66–3); Melbourne 1981–1985 (33–77–0); Sydney 1993–1995 (13–46–0)
Kevin Bartlett	2000	403 games: Richmond (403)	778 goals: Richmond (778)	5 premierships: VFL (5); Richmond; 1. 1967; 2. 1969; 3. 1973; 4. 1974; 5. 1980		Representative honours: Australia (4 games); Victoria (20 games); League honours: Norm Smith Medal (1980); Club honours: Richmond captain (1979); 5× Richmond best and fairest (1967, 1968, 1973, 1974, 1977); 4× Richmond leading goalkicker (1974, 1975, 1977, 1983); Coaching record: Richmond 1988–1991 (27–61–0)
Malcolm Blight	2017	341 games: Woodville (163); North Melbourne (178)	803 goals: Woodville (359); North Melbourne (444)	2 premierships: VFL (2); North Melbourne; 1. 1975; 2. 1977	2 premierships: AFL (2); Adelaide; 1. 1997; 2. 1998	Representative honours: 3× All-Australian (1972, 1982, 1985); 2× All-Australian coach (1997, 1998); South Australia (9 games); Victoria (7 games); League honours: Magarey Medal (1972); Brownlow Medal (1978); Coleman Medal (1982); Ken Farmer Medal (1985); Club honours: 2× Woodville best and fairest (1972, 1985); North Melbourne best and fairest (1978); 4× North Melbourne leading goalkicker (1978, 1979, 1981, 1982); North Melbourne Championship of Australia winner (1975); Coaching record: North Melbourne player-coach 1981 (6–10–0); Woodville player-coach 1983–85, coach 1986–1987 (29–62–0); Geelong 1989–1994 (89–56–0); Adelaide 1997–1999 (41–33–0); St Kilda 2001 (3–12–0)
Haydn Bunton Sr.	1996	208 games: Fitzroy (119); Subiaco (72); Port Adelaide (17)	427 goals: Fitzroy (207); Subiaco (190); Port Adelaide (30)			Representative honours: Victoria (12 games); Western Australia (6 games); League honours: 3× Brownlow Medal (1931, 1932, 1935); 3× Sandover Medal (1938, 1939, 1941); Club honours: Fitzroy captain (1932, 1936–1937); Subiaco captain (1938–1939, 1941); 2× Fitzroy best and fairest (1934, 1935); 3× Subiaco best and fairest (1938, 1939, 1941); 2× Fitzroy leading goalkicker (1936, 1937); 4× Subiaco leading goalkicker (1938, 1939, 1940, 1941); Coaching record: Fitzroy 1936 (2‐16-0); Subiaco 1938–1939, 1941 (18–42–0); North Adelaide 1947–1948 (13–21–0)
Roy Cazaly	1996	198 games: St Kilda (99); South Melbourne (99)	167 goals: St Kilda (38); South Melbourne (129)			Representative honours: Victoria (13 games); Tasmania (5 games); Club honours: St Kilda captain (1920); St Kilda best and fairest (1918); South Melbourne best and fairest (1923); South Melbourne leading goalkicker (1921, 1922); Coaching record: South Melbourne 1922, 1937–1938 (12–38–2); Hawthorn 1942–1943 (10–20–0)
John Coleman	1996	98 games: Essendon (98)	537 goals: Essendon (537)	2 premierships: VFL (2); Essendon; 1. 1949; 2. 1950	2 premierships: VFL (2); Essendon; 1. 1962; 2. 1965	Representative honours: All-Australian (1953); Victoria (12 games); League honours: 5× VFL leading goalkicker (1949, 1950, 1951, 1952, 1953); Club honours: Essendon best and fairest (1949); 6× Essendon leading goalkicker (1949, 1950, 1951, 1952, 1953, 1954); Coaching record: Essendon 1961–1967 (91–40–3)
Gordon Coventry	1998	306 games: Collingwood (306)	1,299 goals: Collingwood (1299)	5 premierships: VFL (5); Collingwood; 1. 1927; 2. 1928; 3. 1929; 4. 1930; 5. 1935		Representative honours: Victoria (25 games); League honours: 6× VFL leading goalkicker (1926, 1927, 1928, 1929, 1930, 1933); Club honours: Collingwood best and fairest (1933); 16× Collingwood leading goalkicker (1922, 1923, 1924, 1925, 1926, 1927, 1928, 1929, 1930, 1931, 1932, 1933, 1934, 1935, 1936, 1937)
Jason Dunstall	2024	269 games: Hawthorn (269)	1254 goals: Hawthorn (1254)	4 premierships: VFL/AFL (4); Hawthorn; 1986; 1988; 1989; 1991		Representative honours: Victoria (3 games, 14 goals); Queensland (4 games, 10 goals); Allies (1 game, 0 goals); Club honours: AFLPA MVP: 1992; 3× Coleman Medal: 1988, 1989, 1992; 2× All-Australian team: 1992, 1994; Hawthorn captain: 1995–1998; 4× Peter Crimmins Memorial Trophy: 1988, 1989, 1992, 1993; 12× Hawthorn leading goalkicker: 1986–1996, 1998; Simpson Medal: 1989; E. J. Whitten Medal: 1989; Hawthorn Hall of Fame – Legend status; Hawthorn Team of the Century
Jack Dyer	1996	312 games: Richmond (312)	443 goals: Richmond (443)	2 premierships: VFL (2); Richmond; 1. 1934; 2. 1943	1 premierships: VFL (1); Richmond; 1. 1943	Representative honours: Victoria (16 games); Club honours: Richmond captain (1941–1949); 7× Richmond best and fairest (1932, 1937, 1938, 1939, 1940, 1941, 1946); Richmond leading goalkicker (1947, 1948); Coaching record: Richmond 1941–1952 (135–89–2)
Russell Ebert	2022	417 games: Port Adelaide (392); North Melbourne (25)	309 goals: Port Adelaide (294); North Melbourne (15)	3 premierships: SANFL (3); Port Adelaide; 1. 1977; 2. 1980; 3. 1981		Representative honours: South Australia (29 games); South Australia state coach 1996, 1997, 1998; League honours: 4× Magarey Medal (1971, 1974, 1976, 1980); Jack Oatey Medal (1981); Club honours: Port Adelaide captain (1974–1978, 1983–1985); 6× Port Adelaide best and fairest (1971, 1972, 1974, 1976, 1977, 1981); Port Adelaide leading goalkicker (1968); Coaching record: Port Adelaide 1983–1987 (64–52–0); Woodville 1988–1990 (24–40–0)
Graham Farmer	1996	356 games: East Perth (176); Geelong (101); West Perth (79)	277 goals: East Perth (157); Geelong (65); West Perth (55)	6 premierships: WAFL (5); East Perth; 1. 1956; 2. 1958; 3. 1959; West Perth; 1. 1969; 2. 1971; VFL (1); Geelong; 1. 1963	2 premierships: WAFL (2); West Perth; 1. 1969; 2. 1971	Representative honours: Tassie Medal (1956); 3× All-Australian (1956, 1958, 1961); 2× Simpson Medal (1956, 1961); Australia (4 games); Western Australia (31); Victoria (5); League honours: 3× Sandover Medal (1956, 1957, 1960); 2× Simpson Medal (1959, 1969); Club honours: Geelong captain (1965–1967); West Perth captain (1968–1971); 7× East Perth best and fairest (1954, 1955, 1956, 1957, 1959, 1960, 1961); 2× Geelong best and fairest (1963, 1964); West Perth best and fairest (1969); Coaching record: Western Australia 1977 (1–1–0); West Perth 1968–1971 (60–29–2); Geelong 1973–1975 (24–42–0); East Perth 1976–1977 (30–15–0)
Ken Farmer	2025	224 games: North Adelaide (224)	1,417 goals: North Adelaide (1417)	2 premierships: SANFL (2); North Adelaide; 1. 1930; 2. 1931	2 premierships: SANFL (2); North Adelaide; 1. 1949; 2. 1952	Representative honours: South Australia (17); Club honours: North Adelaide captain (1934–35, 1937–38, 1941); North Adelaide best and fairest (1936); 13× North Adelaide leading goalkicker (1929–1941); Coaching record: North Adelaide 1949–1952 (53–23–0)
Royce Hart	2013	188 games: Richmond (187); Glenelg (1)	371 goals: Richmond (369); Glenelg (2)	4 premierships: VFL (4); Richmond; 1. 1967; 2. 1969; 3. 1973; 4. 1974		Representative honours: All-Australian (1969); Australia (4 games); Victoria (11); Club honours: Richmond captain (1972–1975); 2× Richmond best and fairest (1969, 1972); 2× Richmond leading goalkicker (1967, 1971); Coaching record: Footscray 1980–1982 (8–45–0)
Peter Hudson	1999	288 games: VFL; Hawthorn (129); TANFL; New Norfolk (78); Glenorchy (81)	1,721 goals: VFL; Hawthorn (727); TANFL; New Norfolk (378); Glenorchy (616)	2 premierships: VFL (1); Hawthorn; 1. 1971; TANFL; Glenorchy; 1. 1975		Representative honours: 2× All-Australian (1966, 1969); Australia (4 games); Victoria (10 games); Tasmania (15 games); League honours: 4× Coleman Medal (1968, 1970, 1971, 1977); 2× William Leitch Medal (1978, 1979); Club honours: 2× Hawthorn best and fairest (1968, 1970); 6× Hawthorn leading goalkicker (1967, 1968, 1969, 1970, 1971, 1977)
Bill Hutchison	2003	290 games: Essendon (290)	496 goals: Essendon (496)	4 premierships: VFL (4); Essendon; 1. 1942; 2. 1946; 3. 1949; 4. 1950		Representative honours: 2× All-Australian (1953, 1956); Victoria captain (1953, 1956); Victoria (30 games); League honours: 2× Brownlow Medal (1952, 1953); Club honours: Essendon captain (1951–1957); 7× Essendon best and fairest (1946, 1948, 1950, 1952, 1953, 1955, 1956); Essendon leading goalkicker (1948)
Alex Jesaulenko	2008	279 games: Carlton (256); St Kilda (23)	444 goals: Carlton (424); St Kilda (20)	4 premierships: VFL (4); Carlton; 1. 1968; 2. 1970; 3. 1972; 4. 1979	1 premierships: VFL (1); Carlton; 1. 1979	Representative honours: 2× All-Australian (1969, 1972); Victoria (15 games); Club honours: Carlton captain (1974–1976, 1978–1979); St Kilda captain (1981); Carlton best and fairest (1975); 3× Carlton leading goalkicker (1969, 1970, 1971); Coaching record: Carlton 1978–1979 (35–7–0); St Kilda 1980–1982 (13–49–2); Carlton 1989–1990 (18–15–1)
John Kennedy Sr.	2020	164 games: Hawthorn (164)	29 goals: Hawthorn (29)		3 premierships: VFL/AFL (3); Hawthorn; 1. 1961; 2. 1971; 3. 1976	Representative honours: Victoria player (4 games); Victoria coach (1 game); Club honours: Hawthorn captain (1955–59); Victoria captain (1957); Hawthorn best and fairest (1950, 1951, 1952, 1954); Coaching record: Hawthorn 1957, 1960–1963, 1967–1976 (181–116–2); North Melbourne 1985–1989 (55–44–3)
Tony Lockett	2015	281 games: St Kilda (183); Sydney (98)	1,360 goals: St Kilda (898); Sydney (462)			Representative honours: 5× All-Australian (1991, 1992, 1995, 1996, 1998); Victoria (5 games); E. J. Whitten Medal (1995); League honours: Brownlow Medal (1987); 4× Coleman Medal (1987, 1991, 1996, 1998); Club honours: 2× St Kilda best and fairest (1987, 1991); Sydney best and fairest (1995); 10× St Kilda leading goalkicker (1984, 1985, 1986, 1987, 1989, 1990, 1991, 1992, 1993, 1994); 5× Sydney leading goalkicker (1995, 1996, 1997, 1998, 1999)
Leigh Matthews	1996	332 games: Hawthorn (332)	915 goals: Hawthorn (915)	4 premierships: VFL (4); Hawthorn; 1. 1971; 2. 1976; 3. 1978; 4. 1983	4 premierships: AFL (4); Collingwood; 1. 1990; Brisbane; 1. 2001; 2. 2002; 3. 2003	Representative honours: All-Australian player (1972); 4× All-Australian coach (1998, 2001, 2002, 2003); Australia (1972); Victoria (14 games); League honours: Coleman Medal (1975); Club honours: Hawthorn captain (1981–1985); 8× Hawthorn best and fairest (1971, 1972, 1974, 1976, 1977, 1978, 1980, 1982); 6× Hawthorn leading goalkicker (1973, 1975, 1981, 1982, 1983, 1984); Coaching record: Victoria 1997–1998 (2–0–0); Collingwood 1986–1995 (125–94–5); Brisbane 1999–2008 (128–88–3)
Jock McHale	2005	261 games: Collingwood (261)	18 goals: Collingwood (18)	2 premierships: VFL (2); Collingwood; 1. 1910; 2. 1917	8 premierships: VFL (8); Collingwood; 1. 1917; 2. 1919; 3. 1927; 4. 1928; 5. 1929; 6. 1930; 7. 1935; 8. 1936	Club honours: Collingwood captain (1912–1913); Coaching record: Collingwood 1912–1949 (467–237–10)
Merv McIntosh	2021	217 games: Perth (217)	79 goals: Perth (79)	1 premiership: WAFL (1); Perth; 1. 1955		Representative honours: All-Australian (1953); Western Australia (24 games); Tassie Medal (1953); League honours: 3× Sandover Medal (1948, 1953, 1954); 3× Simpson Medal (1952, 1953, 1955); Club honours: 7× Perth best and fairest (1946–1950, 1952, 1954)
Kevin Murray	2010	377 games: Fitzroy (333); East Perth (44)	71 goals: Fitzroy (51); East Perth (20)			Representative honours: 2× All-Australian (1958, 1966); Victoria (24 games); Western Australia (6 games); League honours: Brownlow Medal (1969); Club honours: Fitzroy captain (1963–1964, 1967–1972); 9× Fitzroy best and fairest (1956, 1958, 1960, 1961, 1962, 1963, 1964, 1968, 1969); East Perth best and fairest (1965); Coaching record: Fitzroy 1963–1964 (0–34–0); East Perth 1965–1966 (0–34–0)
John Nicholls	1996	328 games: Carlton (328)	307 goals: Carlton (307)	3 premierships: VFL (3); Carlton; 1. 1968; 2. 1970; 3. 1972	1 premierships: VFL (1); Carlton; 1. 1972	Representative honours: 2× All-Australian (1966, 1969); Australia (1968); Victoria (31 games); Club honours: Carlton captain (1963, 1968–1974); 5× Carlton best and fairest (1959, 1963, 1965, 1966, 1967); Coaching record: Carlton 1972–1975 (63–31–3); Glenelg 1977–1978 (30–20–0)
Jack Oatey	2021	186 games: Norwood (162); Norwood–North Adelaide (19); South Melbourne (5)	237 goals: Norwood (218); Norwood–North Adelaide (15); South Melbourne (4)	5 premierships: SANFL (5); Norwood; 1. 1941; Norwood–North Adelaide; 1. 1943; Norwood; 1. 1946; 2. 1948; 3. 1950	10 premierships: SANFL (10); Norwood; 1. 1946; 2. 1948; 3. 1950; Sturt; 1. 1966; 2. 1967; 3. 1968; 4. 1969; 5. 1970; 6. 1974; 7. 1976	Representative honours: South Australia (7 games); South Australia coach (1949, 1950, 1959); Club honours: Norwood captain (1945–1952); 4× Norwood best and fairest (1940, 1941, 1942, 1945); Coaching record: Norwood 1945–1956 (148–80–1); West Adelaide 1957–1960 (59–28–0); Sturt 1962–1982 (314–152–4); Only senior Australian football coach to record more than 500 wins (521)
Bob Pratt	1996	158 games: South Melbourne (158)	681 goals: South Melbourne (681)	1 premiership: VFL (1); South Melbourne; 1. 1933		League honours: 3× VFL leading goalkicker; Club honours: 6× South Melbourne leading goalkicker (1932, 1933, 1934, 1935, 1936, 1939)
Dick Reynolds	1996	320 games: Essendon (320)	442 goals: Essendon (442)	4 premierships: VFL (4); Essendon; 1. 1942; 2. 1946; 3. 1949; 4. 1950	4 premierships: VFL (4); Essendon; 1. 1942; 2. 1946; 3. 1949; 4. 1950	Representative honours: Victoria (19 games); League honours: 3× Brownlow Medal (1934, 1937, 1938); Club honours: Essendon captain (1939–1950); 7× Essendon best and fairest (1934, 1936, 1937, 1938, 1939, 1942, 1943); Essendon leading goalkicker (1943); Coaching record: Essendon 1939–1960 (277–137–6)
Barrie Robran	2001	201 games: North Adelaide (201)	194 goals: North Adelaide (194)	2 premierships: SANFL (2); North Adelaide; 1. 1971; 2. 1972		Representative honours: South Australia (17 games); South Australia captain (1974); League honours: 3× Magarey Medal (1968, 1970, 1973); Club honours: North Adelaide captain (1974–1977, 1980); 7× North Adelaide best and fairest (1967–1973); Coaching record: North Adelaide 1978–1980 (21–45–0)
Kevin Sheedy	2018	251 games: Richmond (251)	91 goals: Richmond (91)	3 premierships: VFL (3); Richmond; 1. 1969; 2. 1973; 3. 1974	4 premierships: VFL/AFL (4); Essendon; 1. 1984; 2. 1985; 3. 1993; 4. 2000	Representative honours: Australia coach (4 games); 4× All-Australian coach (1984, 1985, 1993, 2000); Victoria player (8 games); Victoria coach (4 games); Club honours: Richmond captain (1978); Richmond best and fairest (1976); Coaching record: Essendon 1981–2007 (386–242–7); Greater Western Sydney 2012–2013 (3–41–0)
Bob Skilton	1996	237 games: South Melbourne (237)	412 goals: South Melbourne (412)			Representative honours: Victoria (25 games); League honours: 3× Brownlow Medal (1959, 1963, 1968); Club honours: South Melbourne captain (1961–1969, 1970–1971); 9× South Melbourne best and fairest (1958, 1959, 1961, 1962, 1963, 1964, 1965, 1967, 1968); 3× South Melbourne leading goalkicker 1959, 1962, 1963; Coaching record: South Melbourne 1965–1966 (16–19–0); Melbourne 1974–1976 (28–60–0)
Norm Smith	2007	227 games: Melbourne (210); Fitzroy (17)	572 goals: Melbourne (546); Fitzroy (26)	4 premierships: VFL (4); Melbourne; 1. 1939; 2. 1940; 3. 1941; 4. 1948	6 premierships: VFL (6); Melbourne; 1. 1955; 2. 1956; 3. 1957; 4. 1959; 5. 1960; 6. 1964	Representative honours: Victoria (2 games); League honours: VFL leading goalkicker (1941); Club honours: Melbourne captain (1945–1947); Melbourne best and fairest (1938); 4× Melbourne leading goalkicker (1938, 1939, 1940, 1941); Coaching record: Fitzroy 1949–1951 (30–23–2); Melbourne 1952–1967 (198–107–5); South Melbourne 1969–72 (26–61–0)
Ian Stewart	1997	218 games: St Kilda (127); Richmond (78); Hobart (13)	80 goals: St Kilda (25); Richmond (55); Hobart	2 premierships: VFL (2); St Kilda; 1. 1966; Richmond; 1. 1973		Representative honours: All-Australian (1966); Victoria (20 games); League honours: 3× Brownlow Medal (1965–66, 1971); Club honours: St Kilda captain (1969); St Kilda best and fairest (1964, 1966); Richmond best and fairest (1971); Coaching record: South Melbourne 1976–1977, 1979–1981 (49–60–2); Carlton 1978 (1–2–0)
Bill Walker	2026	305 games: Swan Districts (305)	456 goals: Swan Districts (456)	3 premierships: WAFL (3); Swan Districts; 1. 1961; 2. 1962; 3. 1963		Representative honours: All-Australian (1969); Western Australia (21 games); League honours: 4× Sandover Medal (1965, 1966, 1967, 1970); Simpson Medal (1967); Club honours: 5× Swan Districts best and fairest (1965, 1966, 1968, 1969, 1970); Swan Districts captain (1972–1975); Coaching record: Swan Districts 1969–1971 (14–48–1)
Ted Whitten	1996	321 games: Footscray (321)	360 goals: Footscray (360)	1 premiership: VFL (1); Footscray; 1. 1954		Representative honours: Tassie Medal (1958); 3× All-Australian (1956, 1958, 1961); Victoria (29 games); Club honours: Footscray captain (1957–1966, 1969–1971); Footscray best and fairest (1954, 1957, 1958, 1959, 1961); Footscray leading goalkicker (1961, 1962, 1964, 1968); Coaching record: Footscray 1957–1966, 1969–1971 (91–137–0)

== Player inductees ==
The following table is based on the AFL's official register of player inductees.

Player	Club	State	Playing career	Games played (goals)	Year inducted	Legend status
Gary Ablett Jr.	Geelong	Victoria	2002–2010, 2018–2020	247 (321)	2026	
Gary Ablett Jr.	Gold Coast	Victoria	2011–2017	110 (124)	2026	
Gary Ablett Sr.	Hawthorn	Victoria	1982	6 (10)	2005	
Gary Ablett Sr.	Geelong	Victoria	1984–1997	242 (1021)	2005	
John Abley	Port Adelaide	South Australia	1950–1961	212 (1)	2020	
Michael Aish	Norwood	South Australia	1979–1993	307 (449)	2023	
Jason Akermanis	Brisbane Bears	Queensland	1995–1996	38 (44)	2015	
Jason Akermanis	Brisbane Lions	Queensland	1997–2006	210 (263)	2015	
Jason Akermanis	Western Bulldogs	Victoria	2007–2010	77 (114)	2015	
Glenn Archer	North Melbourne	Victoria	1992–2007	311 (148)	2012	
Graham Arthur	Hawthorn	Victoria	1955–1968	232 (201)	1996	
Allen Aylett	North Melbourne	Victoria	1952–1964	220 (311)	1996	
Gary Ayres	Hawthorn	Victoria	1978–1993	269 (70)	1999	
Paul Bagshaw	Sturt	South Australia	1964–1980	360 (258)	2016	
Darrel Baldock	St Kilda	Victoria	1962–1968	119 (237)	1996	Legend
Darrel Baldock	East Devonport	Tasmania	1955–1958	71	1996	Legend
Darrel Baldock	La Trobe	Tasmania	1959–1961, 1969–1973	158	1996	Legend
Darrel Baldock	New Norfolk	Tasmania	1974	4	1996	Legend
Ron Barassi	Melbourne	Victoria	1953–1964	204 (295)	1996	Legend
Ron Barassi	Carlton	Victoria	1965–1969	50 (35)	1996	Legend
Trevor Barker	St Kilda	Victoria	1975–1989	230 (134)	2019	
Jimmy Bartel	Geelong	Victoria	2002–2016	305 (202)	2023	
Kevin Bartlett	Richmond	Victoria	1965–1983	403 (778)	1996	Legend
Percy Beames	Melbourne	Victoria	1931–1944	213 (323)	1996	
Peter Bedford	Port Melbourne	Victoria	1965–1967, 1978–1979	69	1999	
Peter Bedford	South Melbourne	Victoria	1968–1976	178 (325)	1999	
Peter Bedford	Carlton	Victoria	1977–1978	8 (4)	1999	
Vic Belcher	South Melbourne	Victoria	1907–1915, 1917–1920	226 (62)	1996	
Peter Bell	South Fremantle	Western Australia	1994–1995, 2009	49 (58)	2015	
Peter Bell	Fremantle	Western Australia	1995, 2001–2008	163 (130)	2015	
Peter Bell	North Melbourne	Victoria	1996–2000	123 (120)	2015	
Percy Bentley	Richmond	Victoria	1925–1940	263 (275)	1996	
Mark Bickley	South Adelaide	South Australia	1989–1990	53 (43)	2009	
Mark Bickley	Adelaide	South Australia	1991–2003	272 (77)	2009	
Simon Black	East Fremantle	Western Australia	1997	2 (0)	2020	
Simon Black	Brisbane Lions	Queensland	1998–2013	322 (171)	2020	
Malcolm Blight	Woodville	South Australia	1968–1973, 1983–1985	152 (342)	1996	Legend
Malcolm Blight	North Melbourne	Victoria	1974–1982	178 (444)	1996	Legend
Francis Bourke	Richmond	Victoria	1967–1981	300 (71)	1996	
Craig Bradley	Port Adelaide	South Australia	1981–1985	98 (97)	2006	
Craig Bradley	Carlton	Victoria	1986–2002	375 (247)	2006	
Dermott Brereton	Hawthorn	Victoria	1982–1992	189 (427)	1999	
Dermott Brereton	Sydney	New South Wales	1994	7 (7)	1999	
Dermott Brereton	Collingwood	Victoria	1995	15 (30)	1999	
Gavin Brown	Collingwood	Victoria	1987–2000	254 (195)	2008	
Jonathan Brown	Brisbane Lions	Queensland	2000–2014	256 (594)	2020	
Nathan Buckley	Port Adelaide	South Australia	1991–1992	37 (44)	2011	
Nathan Buckley	Brisbane Bears	Queensland	1993	20 (21)	2011	
Nathan Buckley	Collingwood	Victoria	1994–2007	260 (263)	2011	
Haydn Bunton Sr	Fitzroy	Victoria	1931–1937, 1942	119 (207)	1996	Legend
Haydn Bunton Sr	Subiaco	Western Australia	1938–1941	72 (190)	1996	Legend
Haydn Bunton Sr	Port Adelaide	South Australia	1945	17 (30)	1996	Legend
Nathan Burke	St Kilda	Victoria	1987–2003	323 (123)	2021	
Peter Burns	Ballarat Imperial	Victoria	1885	2 (5)	1996	
Peter Burns	South Melbourne	Victoria	1885–1891	126 (100)	1996	
Peter Burns	Geelong	Victoria	1892–1902	177 (34)	1996	
Peter Carey	Glenelg	South Australia	1971–1988	448 (521)	2009	
Wayne Carey	North Melbourne	Victoria	1989–2001	244 (671)	2010	
Wayne Carey	Adelaide	South Australia	2003–2004	28 (56)	2010	
Terry Cashion	New Town	Tasmania	1939–1941		2022	
Terry Cashion	South Melbourne	Victoria	1942	5 (5)	2022	
Terry Cashion	Clarence	Tasmania	1946–1947		2022	
Terry Cashion	Longford	Tasmania	1948–1951		2022	
Terry Cashion	Sandy Bay	Tasmania	1952–1954		2022	
Roy Cazaly	St Kilda	Victoria	1911–1920	99 (39)	1996	Legend
Roy Cazaly	South Melbourne	Victoria	1921–24, 1926–27	99 (128)	1996	Legend
Roy Cazaly	City	Tasmania	1928–1930	51 (62)	1996	Legend
Roy Cazaly	Preston	Victoria	1931	19 (26)	1996	Legend
Roy Cazaly	North Hobart	Tasmania	1932–1933	26 (35)	1996	Legend
Roy Cazaly	Glenorchy (New Town)	Tasmania	1934–1936	47 (41)	1996	Legend
Roy Cazaly	Camberwell	Victoria	1941	2 (1)	1996	Legend
Albert Chadwick	Melbourne	Victoria	1920–1928	141 (45)	1996	
Albert Chadwick	Hawthorn	Victoria	1929	17 (8)	1996	
David Christy	Ballarat	Victoria	1885–1888	44 (18)	1996	
David Christy	Melbourne	Victoria	1891–1896	88 (67)	1996	
David Christy	Fremantle (1882)	Western Australia	1896–1897	11 (1)	1996	
David Christy	Imperials	Western Australia	1897	6 (0)	1996	
David Christy	East Fremantle	Western Australia	1898–1912	196 (191)	1996	
Jack Clarke (Vic)	Essendon	Victoria	1951–1967	263 (180)	1996	
Jack Clarke (WA)	East Fremantle	Western Australia	1952–1962	206 (6)	1999	
Ron Clegg	South Melbourne	Victoria	1945–1960	231 (156)	1996	
Horrie Clover	Carlton	Victoria	1920–1931	147 (396)	1996	
John Coleman	Essendon	Victoria	1949–1954	98 (537)	1996	Legend
Gordon Coventry	Collingwood	Victoria	1920–1937	306 (1299)	1996	Legend
Albert Collier	Collingwood	Victoria	1925–1930, 1933–1939	205 (54)	1996	
Albert Collier	Fitzroy	Victoria	1941–1942	12 (12)	1996	
Harry Collier	Collingwood	Victoria	1926–1940	253 (299)	1996	
Graham Cornes	Glenelg	South Australia	1967–1982	317 (339)	2012	
Graham Cornes	South Adelaide	South Australia	1983–1984	47 (42)	2012	
Graham Cornes	North Melbourne	Victoria	1979	5 (10)	2012	
George Coulthard	Carlton	Victoria	1876–1882	87 (57)	1996	
Syd Coventry	Collingwood	Victoria	1922–1934	227 (62)	1996	
Dean Cox	East Perth	Western Australia	1999–2003	26 (9)	2020	
Dean Cox	West Coast	Western Australia	2001–2014	290 (169)	2020	
Shane Crawford	Hawthorn	Victoria	1993–2008	305 (224)	2012	
Vic Cumberland	Melbourne	Victoria	1898–1901	50 (15)	1996	
Vic Cumberland	St Kilda	Victoria	1903–1904, 1907–1908, 1912–1915, 1920	126 (72)	1996	
Vic Cumberland	Sturt	South Australia	1909–1911	37 (33)	1996	
Peter Daicos	Collingwood	Victoria	1979–1993	250 (549)	1999	
John Daly	Norwood	South Australia	1887–1898	119 (12)	1996	
John Daly	West Adelaide	South Australia	1899–1904	56 (9)	1996	
Terry Daniher	South Melbourne	Victoria	1976–1977	19 (22)	1998	
Terry Daniher	Essendon	Victoria	1978–1992	294 (447)	1998	
Peter Darley	South Adelaide	South Australia	1962–1974	206 (123)	2025	
Rick Davies	Sturt	South Australia	1970–1980, 1982–1984	317 (635)	2013	
Rick Davies	South Adelaide	South Australia	1985–1986	33 (146)	2013	
Rick Davies	Hawthorn	Victoria	1981	20 (37)	2013	
Barry Davis	Essendon	Victoria	1961–1972	218 (65)	1997	
Barry Davis	North Melbourne	Victoria	1973–1975	71 (54)	1997	
Bob Davis	Geelong	Victoria	1948–1958	189 (141)	1996	
Jim Deane	South Adelaide	South Australia	1945–1953, 1955–1957	157 (95)	2019	
Jim Deane	Richmond	Victoria	1954–1955	33 (17)	2019	
Bill Dempsey	West Perth	Western Australia	1960–1976	343 (89)	2022	
Gary Dempsey	Western Bulldogs (Footscray)	Victoria	1967–1978	207 (105)	1996	
Gary Dempsey	North Melbourne	Victoria	1979–1984	122 (39)	1996	
David Dench	North Melbourne	Victoria	1969–1984	275 (29)	2000	
Robert DiPierdomenico	Hawthorn	Victoria	1975–1991	240 (130)	2007	
Carl Ditterich	St Kilda	Victoria	1963–1972, 1976–1978	203 (156)	2004	
Carl Ditterich	Melbourne	Victoria	1973–1975, 1979–1980	82 (43)	2004	
Brian Dixon	Melbourne	Victoria	1954–1968		2010	
George Doig	East Fremantle	Western Australia	1933–1941, 1945	1096 (202)	2002	
Bruce Doull	Carlton	Victoria	1969–1986		1996	
Jason Dunstall	Coorparoo	Queensland	1984		2002	Legend
Jason Dunstall	Hawthorn	Victoria	1985–1998		2002	Legend
Jack Dyer	Richmond	Victoria	1931–1949		1996	Legend
Russell Ebert	Port Adelaide	South Australia	1968–1978, 1980–1985		1996	Legend
Russell Ebert	North Melbourne	Victoria	1979		1996	Legend
Wels Eicke	St Kilda	Victoria	1909–1924, 1926		1996	
Wels Eicke	North Melbourne	Victoria	1925–1926		1996	
Corey Enright	Geelong	Victoria	2001–2016		2023	
Tim Evans	Geelong	Tasmania / South Australia	1971–1974	59 (26)	2026	
Tim Evans	Port Adelaide	Tasmania / South Australia	1975–1986	232 (1019)	2026	
Graham 'Polly' Farmer	East Perth	Western Australia	1953–1961		1996	Legend
Graham 'Polly' Farmer	Geelong	Victoria	1962–1967		1996	Legend
Graham 'Polly' Farmer	West Perth	Western Australia	1968–1971		1996	Legend
Ken Farmer	North Adelaide	South Australia	1929–1941	224 (1417)	1998	Legend
Len Fitzgerald	Collingwood	Victoria	1945–1950		1996	
Len Fitzgerald	Sturt	South Australia	1951–1955, 1959–1962		1996	
Tom Fitzmaurice	Essendon	Victoria	1918–1924		1996	
Tom Fitzmaurice	Geelong	Victoria	1925–1928		1996	
Tom Fitzmaurice	North Melbourne	Victoria	1932–1935		1996	
Mike Fitzpatrick	Subiaco	Western Australia	1970–1974		2022	
Mike Fitzpatrick	Carlton	Victoria	1975–1983		2022	
Fred Flanagan	Geelong	Victoria	1946–1955		1998	
Dustin Fletcher	Essendon	Victoria	1993–2015	400 (71)	2026	
Robert Flower	Melbourne	Victoria	1973–1987		1996	
Les Foote	North Melbourne	Victoria	1941–1951		1996	
Les Foote	St Kilda	Victoria	1954–1955		1996	
Des Fothergill	Collingwood	Victoria	1937–1947		2000	
Ken Fraser	Essendon	Victoria	1958–1968		2001	
Ross Glendinning	East Perth	Western Australia	1974–1977		2000	
Ross Glendinning	West Coast	Western Australia	1987–1988		2000	
Ross Glendinning	North Melbourne	Victoria	1977–1986		2000	
Bill Goggin	Geelong	Victoria	1958–1971		2000	
Simon Goodwin	Adelaide	South Australia	1997–2010	275 (162)	2017	
Horrie Gorringe	Cananore	Tasmania	1914–1930		2011	
Michael Graham	Sturt	South Australia	1971–1986	282 (455)	2024	
Michael Graham	St Mary's	Northern Territory	1971–1986	230	2024	
Chris Grant	Western Bulldogs (Footscray)	Victoria	1990–2007		2012	
Carji Greeves	Geelong	Victoria	1923–1933		1996	
Keith Greig	North Melbourne	Victoria	1971–1985		1996	
John Halbert	Sturt	South Australia	1955–1968		2017	
Barry Hall	St Kilda	Victoria	1996–2001		2017	
Barry Hall	Sydney	New South Wales	2002–2009		2017	
Barry Hall	Western Bulldogs	Victoria	2010–2011		2017	
Ken Hands	Carlton	Victoria	1945–1957		2009	
Bob Hank	West Torrens	South Australia	1945–1958		1999	
Brad Hardie	South Fremantle	Western Australia	1979–1984, 1993	140 (308)	2019	
Brad Hardie	Footscray	Victoria	1985–1986	47 (28)	2019	
Brad Hardie	Brisbane Bears	Queensland	1987–1991	101 (192)	2019	
Brad Hardie	Collingwood	Victoria	1992	2 (2)	2019	
Ben Hart	North Adelaide	South Australia	1990–1991		2016	
Ben Hart	Adelaide	South Australia	1992–2006		2016	
Royce Hart	Richmond	Victoria	1967–1977		1996	Legend
Royce Hart	Glenelg	South Australia	1969		1996	Legend
Brent Harvey	North Melbourne	Victoria	1996–2016		2022	
Robert Harvey	St Kilda	Victoria	1988–2008		2012	
Doug Hawkins	Western Bulldogs (Footscray)	Victoria	1978–1994		2004	
Doug Hawkins	Fitzroy	Victoria	1995		2004	
Lenny Hayes	St Kilda	Victoria	1999–2014		2020	
Lindsay Head	West Torrens	South Australia	1952–1970		1996	
Stan Heal	West Perth	Western Australia	1939–1953		2010	
Stan Heal	Melbourne	Victoria	1941		2010	
Gerard Healy	Melbourne	Victoria	1979–1985		2000	
Gerard Healy	Sydney	New South Wales	1986–1990		2000	
Ern Henfry	Perth	Western Australia	1937–1941, 1945, 1953–1954		2014	
Ern Henfry	Carlton	Victoria	1944, 1947–1952		2014	
Reg Hickey	Geelong	Victoria	1926–1940		1996	
James Hird	Essendon	Victoria	1992–2007		2011	
Garry Hocking	Geelong	Victoria	1987–2001		2008	
Luke Hodge	Hawthorn	Victoria	2002–2017	305 (193)	2025	
Luke Hodge	Brisbane Lions	Queensland	2018–2019	41 (1)	2025	
Allan Hopkins	Western Bulldogs (Footscray)	Victoria	1925–1934		1996	
Verdun Howell	City South	Tasmania	1953–1957		2016	
Verdun Howell	St Kilda	Victoria	1958–1968		2016	
Peter Hudson	Hawthorn	Victoria	1967–1974		1996	Legend
Peter Hudson	New Norfolk	Tasmania	1963–1966		1996	Legend
Peter Hudson	Glenorchy	Tasmania	1975–1976, 1978–1979, 1981		1996	Legend
Ken Hunter	Claremont	Western Australia	1975–1980		2019	
Ken Hunter	Carlton	Victoria	1980–1989		2019	
Bill Hutchison	Essendon	Victoria	1942–1957		1996	Legend
Glen Jakovich	South Fremantle	Western Australia	1989–1991	51 (109)	2008	
Glen Jakovich	West Coast	Western Australia	1991–2004	276 (60)	2008	
Darren Jarman	North Adelaide	South Australia	1985–1990		2007	
Darren Jarman	Adelaide	South Australia	1996–2001		2007	
Darren Jarman	Hawthorn	Victoria	1991–1995		2007	
Alex Jesaulenko	Carlton	Victoria	1967–1979		1996	Legend
Alex Jesaulenko	St Kilda	Victoria	1980–1981		1996	Legend
Bob Johnson	Melbourne	Victoria	1954–1961		2012	
Bob Johnson	Oakleigh	Victoria	1970–1973		2012	
Bob Johnson	East Fremantle	Western Australia	1962–1966		2012	
Bob Johnson	Subiaco	Western Australia	1967		2012	
Brad Johnson	Western Bulldogs (Footscray)	Victoria	1994–2010		2014	
Frank Johnson	South Melbourne	Victoria	1960–1964		2007	
Frank Johnson	Port Melbourne	Victoria	1950–1957		2007	
Wayne Johnston	Carlton	Victoria	1979–1990		2018	
Chris Judd	West Coast	Western Australia	2002–2007		2021	
Chris Judd	Carlton	Victoria	2008–2015		2021	
David Kantilla	St Mary's (NTFL)	Northern Territory	1958–1969	c. 180	2026	
David Kantilla	South Adelaide	Northern Territory	1961–1966	113 (106)	2026	
Paul Kelly	Sydney	New South Wales	1990–2002		2007	
Dean Kemp	West Coast	Western Australia	1990–2001		2007	
Dean Kemp	Subiaco	Western Australia	1989–1991		2007	
Neil Kerley	West Adelaide	South Australia	1952, 1955–1963		1997	
Neil Kerley	South Adelaide	South Australia	1964–1966		1997	
Neil Kerley	Glenelg	South Australia	1967–1969		1997	
Stephen Kernahan	Glenelg	South Australia	1981–1985		2001	
Stephen Kernahan	Carlton	Victoria	1986–1997		2001	
Peter Knights	Hawthorn	Victoria	1969–1985		1996	
Anthony Koutoufides	Carlton	Victoria	1992–2007		2014	
Phonse Kyne	Collingwood	Victoria	1934–1944, 1946–1950		1996	
Allan La Fontaine	Melbourne	Victoria	1934–1942, 1945		1996	
Chris Langford	Hawthorn	Victoria	1983–1997		2009	
Nigel Lappin	Brisbane Bears	Queensland	1994–1996		2016	
Nigel Lappin	Brisbane Lions	Queensland	1997–2008		2016	
Tom Leahy	West Adelaide	South Australia	1905–1909		2023	
Tom Leahy	North Adelaide	South Australia	1910–1915, 1919–1921		2023	
Dick Lee	Collingwood	Victoria	1906–1922		1996	
John Leedham	North Launceston	Tasmania	1946–1950, 1953		2025	
John Leedham	Campbell Town	Tasmania	1951–1952		2025	
John Leedham	North Hobart	Tasmania	1954–1959		2025	
Johnny Lewis	North Melbourne	Victoria	1925–1935		1996	
Johnny Lewis	Melbourne	Victoria	1936–1938		1996	
Matthew Lloyd	Essendon	Victoria	1995–2009		2013	
Tony Lockett	St Kilda	Victoria	1983–1994		2006, Legend	Legend
Tony Lockett	Sydney	New South Wales	1995–1999, 2002		2006, Legend	Legend
Michael Long	West Torrens	South Australia	1987–1988		2007	
Michael Long	Essendon	Victoria	1989–2001		2007	
Garry Lyon	Melbourne	Victoria	1986–1999	226 (426)	2025	
Tom MacKenzie	West Torrens	South Australia	1900–1904, 1909–1914		1996	
Tom MacKenzie	North Adelaide	South Australia	1905–1908		1996	
Simon Madden	Essendon	Victoria	1974–1992		1996	
Hassa Mann	Melbourne	Victoria	1959–1968	178 (193)	2013	
Hassa Mann	South Fremantle	Western Australia	1969–1971	62 (133)	2013	
Steve Marsh	South Fremantle	Western Australia	1945–1956	226 (418)	2006	
Steve Marsh	East Fremantle	Western Australia	1957–1958, 1960	39 (51)	2006	
Denis Marshall	Claremont	Western Australia	1958–1963, 1969–1972		2004	
Denis Marshall	Geelong	Victoria	1964–1968		2004	
Peter Matera	South Fremantle	Western Australia	1987–1989	60 (88)	2006	
Peter Matera	West Coast	Western Australia	1990–2002	253 (217)	2006	
Herbie Matthews	South Melbourne	Victoria	1932–1945		2003	
Leigh Matthews	Hawthorn	Victoria	1969–1985		1996	Legend
Chris McDermott	Glenelg	South Australia	1981–1996	227 (154)	2024	
Chris McDermott	Adelaide	South Australia	1991–1996	117 (25)	2024	
Chris McDermott	North Adelaide	South Australia	1997	10 (0)	2024	
Rod McGregor	Carlton	Victoria	1905–1912, 1914–1920		1996	
Jock McHale	Collingwood	Victoria	1903–1920		1996	Legend
Merv McIntosh	Perth	Western Australia	1939–1941, 1946–1955		1996	Legend
Andrew McLeod	Port Adelaide	South Australia	1994		2014	
Andrew McLeod	Adelaide	South Australia	1995–2010		2014	
Guy McKenna	Claremont	Western Australia	1985–1987	50 (5)	2009	
Guy McKenna	West Coast	Western Australia	1988–2000	267 (28)	2009	
Peter McKenna	Collingwood	Victoria	1965–1975		1999	
Peter McKenna	Carlton	Victoria	1977		1999	
Dave McNamara	St Kilda	Victoria	1905–1923		1996	
Stephen Michael	South Fremantle	Western Australia	1975–1985	243 (231)	1999	
Dan Minogue	Collingwood	Victoria	1911–1916		1996	
Dan Minogue	Richmond	Victoria	1920–1925		1996	
Dan Minogue	Hawthorn	Victoria	1926		1996	
Sam Mitchell	Hawthorn	Victoria	2002–2016		2023	
Sam Mitchell	West Coast	Western Australia	2017		2023	
Bill Mohr	St Kilda	Victoria	1929–1941		1996	
George Moloney	Geelong	Victoria	1931–1935		1996	
George Moloney	Claremont	Western Australia	1927–1930, 1936–1945		1996	
Kelvin Moore	Hawthorn	Victoria	1970–1984		2005	
Peter Moore	Collingwood	Victoria	1974–1982		2005	
Peter Moore	Melbourne	Victoria	1983–1987		2005	
Dan Moriarty	South Adelaide	South Australia	1919–1925		1996	
Jack Moriarty	Essendon	Victoria	1922		2004	
Jack Moriarty	Fitzroy	Victoria	1924–1933		2004	
Bill Morris	Richmond	Victoria	1942–1951		2009	
Graham Moss	Essendon	Victoria	1973–1976		1996	
Graham Moss	Claremont	Western Australia	1969–1972, 1977–1985		1996	
Geof Motley	Port Adelaide	South Australia	1953–1966		2002	
Jack Mueller	Melbourne	Victoria	1934–1950		1996	
John Murphy	Fitzroy	Victoria	1967–1977		2006	
John Murphy	South Melbourne	Victoria	1978–1979		2006	
John Murphy	North Melbourne	Victoria	1979–1980		2006	
Kevin Murray	Fitzroy	Victoria	1955–1964, 1967–1974		1996	Legend
Kevin Murray	East Perth	Western Australia	1965–1966		1996	Legend
Ian Nankervis	Geelong	Victoria	1967–1983		2005	
Laurie Nash	South Melbourne	Victoria	1933–1937, 1945		1996	
Laurie Nash	Camberwell	Victoria	1938–1941		1996	
Laurie Nash	City	Tasmania	1930–1932		1996	
Bernie Naylor	South Fremantle	Western Australia	1941–1954	194 (1034)	2018	
David Neitz	Melbourne	Victoria	1993–2008		2018	
John Newman	Geelong	Victoria	1964–1980		2002	
John Nicholls	Carlton	Victoria	1957–1974		1996	Legend
Michael O'Loughlin	Sydney	New South Wales	1995–2009		2015	
Arthur Olliver	Western Bulldogs (Footscray)	Victoria	1935–1950		2003	
George Owens	East Perth	Western Australia	1917–1932	195 (226)	2025	
Charlie Pannam	Collingwood	Victoria	1894–1907		1996	
Charlie Pannam	Richmond	Victoria	1908		1996	
Matthew Pavlich	Woodville-West Torrens	South Australia	1999		2022	
Matthew Pavlich	Fremantle	Western Australia	2000–2016		2022	
Brian Peake	East Fremantle	Western Australia	1972–1981, 1985–1990		2013	
Brian Peake	Perth	Western Australia	1990		2013	
Brian Peake	Geelong	Victoria	1981–1984		2013	
Greg Phillips	Port Adelaide	South Australia	1976–1982, 1987–1993		2020	
Greg Phillips	Collingwood	Victoria	1983–1986		2020	
John Platten	Central District	South Australia	1981–1985, 1998	107 (254)	2003	
John Platten	Hawthorn	Victoria	1986–1997	258 (228)	2003	
Bob Pratt	South Melbourne	Victoria	1930–1939, 1946		1996	Legend
Bernie Quinlan	Western Bulldogs (Footscray)	Victoria	1969–1977		1996	
Bernie Quinlan	Fitzroy	Victoria	1978–1986		1996	
Bob Quinn	Port Adelaide	South Australia	1933–1940, 1945–1947		1996	
John Rantall	South Melbourne	Victoria	1963–1972, 1976–1979		1996	
John Rantall	North Melbourne	Victoria	1973–1975		1996	
John Rantall	Fitzroy	Victoria	1980		1996	
Jack 'Dinny' Reedman	Hotham (SAFA)	South Australia	1887–1888		1996	
Jack 'Dinny' Reedman	South Adelaide	South Australia	1889–1898	172	1996	
Jack 'Dinny' Reedman	North Adelaide	South Australia	1899–1907, 1909	115	1996	
Jack Regan	Collingwood	Victoria	1930–1941, 1943, 1946		1996	
Dick Reynolds	Essendon	Victoria	1933–1951		1996	Legend
Mark Ricciuto	West Adelaide	South Australia	1992–1993		2011	
Mark Ricciuto	Adelaide	South Australia	1993–2007		2011	
Lou Richards	Collingwood	Victoria	1941–1955		1996	
Matthew Richardson	Richmond	Victoria	1993–2009		2014	
Wayne Richardson	Collingwood	Victoria	1966–1978		2003	
Nick Riewoldt	St Kilda	Victoria	2001–2017	336 (718)	2025	
Maurice Rioli	South Fremantle	Western Australia	1975–1981, 1988–1990	168 (133)	2016	
Maurice Rioli	Richmond	Victoria	1982–1987	118 (80)	2016	
Neil Roberts	St Kilda	Victoria	1952–1962		2015	
Austin Robertson Jr.	Subiaco	Western Australia	1962–1965, 1967–1974		2015	
Austin Robertson Jr.	South Melbourne	Victoria	1966		2015	
Ralph Robertson	St Kilda	Victoria	1899–1900	14 (1)	2024	
Ralph Robertson	East Sydney	New South Wales	1903–1909		2024	
Ralph Robertson	North Shore	New South Wales	1909–1914		2024	
Barrie Robran	North Adelaide	South Australia	1967–1980		1996	Legend
Paul Roos	Fitzroy	Victoria	1982–1994		2005	
Paul Roos	Sydney	New South Wales	1995–1998		2005	
Bob Rose	Collingwood	Victoria	1946–1955		1996	
Barry Round	Western Bulldogs (Footscray)	Victoria	1968–1975		2001	
Barry Round	Sydney	New South Wales	1976–1985		2001	
Allan Ruthven	Fitzroy	Victoria	1940–1954		1998	
Paul Salmon	Essendon	Victoria	1983–1995, 2000		2016	
Paul Salmon	Hawthorn	Victoria	1996–2000		2016	
Matthew Scarlett	Geelong	Victoria	1998–2012		2018	
Wayne Schimmelbusch	North Melbourne	Victoria	1973–1987		1997	
Ray Schofield	West Perth	Western Australia	1946–1958	259 (169)	2024	
John Schultz	Western Bulldogs (Footscray)	Victoria	1958–1968		1996	
Don Scott	Hawthorn	Victoria	1967–1981		2001	
Walter Scott	Norwood	South Australia	1920–1932		1996	
Tony Shaw	Collingwood	Victoria	1978–1994		2010	
Jack Sheedy	East Fremantle	Western Australia	1942–1944, 1946–1955		2001	
Jack Sheedy	East Perth	Western Australia	1956–1962		2001	
Jack Sheedy	South Melbourne	Victoria	1944		2001	
Kevin Sheedy	Richmond	Victoria	1967–1979		2008	Legend
Stephen Silvagni	Carlton	Victoria	1985–2001		2005	
Bob Skilton	South Melbourne	Victoria	1956–1968, 1970–1971		1996	Legend
Wilfred Smallhorn	Fitzroy	Victoria	1930–1940		2006	
Bernie Smith	West Adelaide	South Australia	1945–1947		1996	
Bernie Smith	Geelong	Victoria	1948–1958		1996	
Norm Smith	Melbourne	Victoria	1935–1948		1996	Legend
Norm Smith	Fitzroy	Victoria	1949–1950		1996	Legend
Ross Smith	St Kilda	Victoria	1961–1972, 1975		2010	
Ross Smith	Subiaco	Western Australia	1973–1974		2010	
Ray Sorrell	East Fremantle	Western Australia	1956–1963, 1967–1968	156 (55)	2016	
Ray Sorrell	South Fremantle	Western Australia	1964–1965	22 (8)	2016	
Geoff Southby	Carlton	Victoria	1971–1984		2000	
Stuart Spencer	Melbourne	Victoria	1950–1956		2005	
Stuart Spencer	Clarence	Tasmania	1957–1967		2005	
Anthony Stevens	North Melbourne	Victoria	1989–2004		2017	
Ian Stewart	St Kilda	Victoria	1963–1970		1996	Legend
Ian Stewart	Richmond	Victoria	1971–1975		1996	Legend
Ian Stewart	Hobart	Tasmania	1962		1996	Legend
Jim Stynes	Melbourne	Victoria	1987–1998		2003	
Charlie Sutton	Footscray	Victoria	1942–1956		1996	
Dane Swan	Collingwood	Victoria	2003–2016	258 (211)	2024	
Mark Tandy	South Melbourne	Victoria	1911–1926		1996	
Michael Taylor	Norwood	South Australia	1972–1980, 1985–1987		2022	
Michael Taylor	Collingwood	Victoria	1981–1984		2022	
Noel Teasdale	North Melbourne	Victoria	1956–1967		2008	
Kelvin Templeton	Footscray	Victoria	1974–1982	143 (434)	2024	
Kelvin Templeton	Melbourne	Victoria	1983–1985	34 (99)	2024	
Len Thompson	Collingwood	Victoria	1965–1978		1998	
Len Thompson	South Melbourne	Victoria	1979		1998	
Len Thompson	Fitzroy	Victoria	1980		1998	
Vic Thorp	Richmond	Victoria	1910–1925		1996	
Albert Thurgood	Essendon	Victoria	1892–1902, 1906		1996	
Jack Titus	Richmond	Victoria	1926–1943		1996	
George Todd	Geelong	Victoria	1922–1934		1996	
Ron Todd	Collingwood	Victoria	1935–1939		2017	
Ron Todd	Williamstown	Victoria	1940–1941, 1945–1949		2017	
Warren Tredrea	Port Adelaide	South Australia	1996–2010		2014	
William Truscott	East Fremantle	Western Australia	1913–1924		1996	
Michael Tuck	Hawthorn	Victoria	1972–1991		1996	
Des Tuddenham	Collingwood	Victoria	1962–1971, 1976–1977		2008	
Des Tuddenham	Essendon	Victoria	1972–1975		2008	
Ted Tyson	West Perth	Western Australia	1930–1941, 1945		2022	
Harry Vallence	Carlton	Victoria	1926–1938		1996	
Michael Voss	Brisbane Bears	Queensland	1992–1996		2011	
Michael Voss	Brisbane Lions	Queensland	1997–2006		2011	
Doug Wade	Geelong	Victoria	1961–1972		1996	
Doug Wade	North Melbourne	Victoria	1973–1975		1996	
Bill Walker	Swan Districts	Western Australia	1961–1976		1996	Legend
Terry Wallace	Hawthorn	Victoria	1978–1986		2018	
Terry Wallace	Richmond	Victoria	1987		2018	
Terry Wallace	Footscray	Victoria	1988–1991		2018	
Robert Walls	Carlton	Victoria	1967–1978		2006	
Robert Walls	Fitzroy	Victoria	1978–1980		2006	
Gavin Wanganeen	Port Adelaide	South Australia	1990, 1997–2006		2010	
Gavin Wanganeen	Essendon	Victoria	1991–1996		2010	
Norman Ware	Western Bulldogs (Footscray)	Victoria	1932–1946		2001	
Ivor Warne-Smith	Melbourne	Victoria	1919, 1925–1932		1996	
Ivor Warne-Smith	Latrobe	Tasmania	1920–1924		1996	
Colin Watson	St Kilda	Victoria	1920, 1922–1925, 1933–1935		1996	
Tim Watson	Essendon	Victoria	1977–1991, 1993–1994		2000	
Murray Weideman	West Adelaide	South Australia	1968–1969		2007	
Murray Weideman	Collingwood	Victoria	1953–1963		2007	
Dale Weightman	Richmond	Victoria	1978–1993		2001	
Scott West	Western Bulldogs (Footscray)	Victoria	1993–2008		2013	
Mel Whinnen	West Perth	Western Australia	1960–1977		2018	
Ted Whitten	Western Bulldogs (Footscray)	Victoria	1951–1970		1996	Legend
Robert Wiley	Perth	Western Australia	1974–78, 1984–88	179 (415)	2021	
Robert Wiley	Richmond	Victoria	1979–1983	95 (127)	2021	
Robert Wiley	West Coast	Western Australia	1987	18 (24)	2021	
Greg Williams	Geelong	Victoria	1984–1985		2001	
Greg Williams	Carlton	Victoria	1986–1991		2001	
Greg Williams	Sydney	New South Wales	1992–1997		2001	
Mark Williams	West Adelaide	South Australia	1976–1978		2023	
Mark Williams	Port Adelaide	South Australia	1979–80, 1990–92		2023	
Mark Williams	Collingwood	Victoria	1981–1986		2023	
Mark Williams	Brisbane Bears	Queensland	1987–1990		2023	
Garry Wilson	Fitzroy	Victoria	1971–1984		1999	
Jack Worrall	Fitzroy	Victoria	1884–1893		1996	
John Worsfold	West Coast	Western Australia	1987–1998	209 (37)	2026	
Roy Wright	Richmond	Victoria	1946–1959		1996	
Henry Young	Geelong	Victoria	1893–1910		1996	

== Women inductees ==
Debbie Lee became the first woman inducted into the Hall of Fame in 2021. Daisy Pearce and Erin Phillips became the first AFL Women's players inducted in 2025.

Player	Club	State	Playing career	Games played (goals)	Year inducted
Debbie Lee	East Brunswick Scorpions (VWFL); St Albans Spurs (VWFL)	Victoria	1991–2014	302	2021
Daisy Pearce	Melbourne (AFLW)	Victoria	2017–2022 (S7)	55 (25)	2025
Erin Phillips	Adelaide (AFLW); Port Adelaide (AFLW)	South Australia	2017–2022 (S6); 2022 (S7)–2023	46 (50); 20 (3)	2025

== Coach inductees ==
The following table is based on the AFL's official register of coach inductees.

Coach	Clubs coached	Record (W–L–D)	Premierships coached		Year inducted	Legend status
Haydn Bunton Jr	Norwood	101 (52–48–1)		5	1996	
Haydn Bunton Jr	Launceston	16 (6–10–0)		5	1996	
Haydn Bunton Jr	Swan Districts	92 (55–35–2)	1961, 1962, 1963	5	1996	
Haydn Bunton Jr	Subiaco	314 (168–145–1)	1986, 1988	5	1996	
Haydn Bunton Jr	South Adelaide	179 (84–93–2)		5	1996	
Haydn Bunton Jr	Sturt	42 (9–33–0)		5	1996	
John Cahill	Port Adelaide	465 (330–129–6)	1977, 1979, 1980, 1981, 1988, 1989, 1990, 1992, 1994, 1995	10	2002	
John Cahill	Collingwood	47 (27–20–0)		10	2002	
John Cahill	West Adelaide	69 (34–35–0)		10	2002	
John Cahill	South Adelaide	20 (5–14–1)		10	2002	
Tom Hafey	Richmond	248 (173–73–2)	1967, 1969, 1973, 1974	4	1996	
Tom Hafey	Collingwood	138 (89–47–2)		4	1996	
Tom Hafey	Geelong	66 (31–35–0)		4	1996	
Tom Hafey	Sydney	70 (43–27–0)		4	1996	
Frank Hughes	Richmond	120 (87–31–2)	1932	5	1996	
Frank Hughes	Melbourne	254 (157–95–2)	1939, 1940, 1941, 1948	5	1996	
Allan Jeans	St Kilda	332 (193–138–1)	1966	4	1996	
Allan Jeans	Hawthorn	221 (159–61–1)	1983, 1986, 1989	4	1996	
Allan Jeans	Richmond	22 (5–17–0)		4	1996	
John Kennedy Sr	Hawthorn	299 (181–116–2)	1961, 1971, 1976	3	1996	Legend
John Kennedy Sr	North Melbourne	113 (55–55–3)		3	1996	Legend
Johnny Leonard	South Melbourne	19 (13–6–0)		5	1996	
Johnny Leonard	West Perth	66 (43–22–1)	1934, 1935	5	1996	
Johnny Leonard	Claremont	109 (65–43–1)	1938, 1939, 1940	5	1996	
Mick Malthouse	Footscray	135 (67–66–2)		3	2019	
Mick Malthouse	West Coast	243 (156–85–2)	1992, 1994	3	2019	
Mick Malthouse	Collingwood	286 (163–121–2)	2010	3	2019	
Mick Malthouse	Carlton	54 (20–33–1)		3	2019	
Phillip Matson	Subiaco	1913–1914	1913	8	2004	
Phillip Matson	East Perth	1918–1924, 1926–1928	1919, 1920, 1921, 1922, 1923, 1926, 1927	8	2004	
Jack Oatey	Norwood	229 (147–81–1)	1945, 1948, 1950	10	1996	Legend
Jack Oatey	West Adelaide	78 (52–26–0)		10	1996	Legend
Jack Oatey	Sturt	470 (314–152–4)	1966, 1967, 1968, 1969, 1970, 1974, 1976	10	1996	Legend
David Parkin	Hawthorn	94 (57–37–0)	1978	4	2002	
David Parkin	Carlton	355 (219–134–2)	1981, 1982, 1995	4	2002	
David Parkin	Fitzroy	69 (30–39–0)		4	2002	
Jack Sheedy	East Fremantle	39 (23–16–0)		2	2001	
Jack Sheedy	East Perth	223 (149–72–3)	1956, 1959	2	2001	
Kevin Sheedy	Essendon	635 (386–242–7)	1984, 1985, 1993, 2000	4	2008	Legend
Kevin Sheedy	GWS Giants	44 (3–41–0)		4	2008	Legend
John Todd	Swan Districts	417 (217–200–0)	1982, 1983, 1984, 1990	6	2003	
John Todd	East Fremantle	87 (45–41–1)	1974	6	2003	
John Todd	South Fremantle	172 (83–88–1)	1997	6	2003	
John Todd	West Coast	45 (20–25–0)		6	2003	
Fos Williams	Port Adelaide	447 (333–112–2)	1951, 1954, 1955, 1956, 1957, 1958, 1962, 1963, 1965	9	1996	
Fos Williams	West Adelaide	109 (42–67–0)		9	1996	
Fos Williams	South Adelaide	18 (3–15–0)		9	1996	
Norm Smith	Fitzroy	55 (30–23–2)		6	1996	Legend
Norm Smith	Melbourne	310 (198–107–5)	1955, 1956, 1957, 1959, 1960, 1964	6	1996	Legend
Norm Smith	South Melbourne	87 (26–61–0)		6	1996	Legend

== Umpires ==
The Hall of Fame includes field umpires from the major state leagues and the VFL/AFL.

Umpire	Primary League(s)	Year Inducted
Brett Allen	VFL/AFL	2017
Ken Aplin	SANFL	1996
Henry "Ivo" Crapp	VFA / VFL / WAFL	1996
Jeff Crouch	VFL	1996
Bill Deller	VFL	1996
Jack Elder	VFL	1996
Hayden Kennedy	AFL	2026
Tom McArthur	QAFL	2008
Jack McMurray Sr.	VFA / VFL / NTFA	1996
Jack McMurray Jr.	VFL	1996
George Owens	WANFL	2025
Ian Robinson	VFL	1996
Rowan Sawers	VFL/AFL	2004
Bob Scott	VFL	1996
Ray Scott	WANFL	1996
Bryan Sheehan	VFL/AFL	2013

== Media ==
The media category recognises football journalists, broadcasters and commentators.

- Norman Banks (radio, Victoria)
- Harry Beitzel (radio and print, Victoria)
- Alf Brown (print, Victoria)
- Hugh Buggy (print, Victoria)
- Ron Casey (radio and television, Victoria)
- Tony Charlton (radio and television, Victoria)
- Geoff Christian (radio and print, Western Australia)
- Dennis Cometti (radio and television, national)
- Hector DeLacy (print, Victoria)
- Bruce McAvaney (radio and television, national)
- Reginald Wilmot (print, Victoria)

== Administrators ==
The administrators category recognises service to clubs, leagues and the national administration of the game.

- Bruce Andrew (Collingwood, ANFC)
- Max Basheer (SANFL)
- Charles Brownlow (Geelong, VFL, ANFC)
- Ron Evans (Essendon, AFL)
- Jack Hamilton (VFL)
- Bob Hammond (Adelaide, AFL)
- H. C. A. Harrison (Melbourne, VFA)
- Thomas Hill (Norwood, SANFL, ANFC)
- Sir Kenneth Luke (Carlton, VFL)
- Likely 'Like' McBrien (South Melbourne, VFL)
- Bob McLean (Port Adelaide, SANFL)
- Dr William C. McClelland (Melbourne, VFL)
- Eric McCutchan (VFL)
- Ross Oakley (VFL/AFL)
- Pat Rodriguez (Claremont, WAFL, ANFC)
- Tom Wills (Melbourne)

== Pioneers ==
The Pioneers category was created in 2013 to recognise people who played pivotal roles in establishing Australian football in its earliest years. Four pioneers were inducted in 2014 and three in 2017.

- John Acraman (2017)
- Jerry Bryant (2014)
- William Hammersley (2014)
- Charles Kingston (2017)
- Thomas H. Smith (2014)
- James Thompson (2014)
- Richard Twopeny (2017)

== Induction ceremony ==
New inductees and Legend elevations are normally announced at the annual Australian Football Hall of Fame induction dinner. The first ceremony was held in Melbourne in 1996 as part of the AFL's centenary celebrations.

As of 2026, the ceremony had been staged outside Melbourne twice: in Canberra in 2013, when the centenary of Australian football in the Australian Capital Territory was commemorated, and at Adelaide Oval in 2017.

In 2020, because of the COVID-19 pandemic, the dinner was replaced by a four-night series of televised presentations. The 2021 induction was also conducted as a broadcast-only event because pandemic restrictions prevented an in-person ceremony.

=== Induction locations ===
- 1996: Melbourne, VIC
- 1997: Melbourne, VIC
- 1998: Melbourne, VIC
- 1999: Melbourne, VIC
- 2000: Melbourne, VIC
- 2001: Melbourne, VIC
- 2002: Melbourne, VIC
- 2003: Melbourne, VIC
- 2004: Melbourne, VIC
- 2005: Melbourne, VIC
- 2006: Melbourne, VIC
- 2007: Melbourne, VIC
- 2008: Melbourne, VIC
- 2009: Melbourne, VIC
- 2010: Melbourne, VIC
- 2011: Melbourne, VIC
- 2012: Melbourne, VIC – (Crown)
- 2013: Canberra, ACT – the Great Hall, Parliament House
- 2014: Melbourne, VIC – (Crown)
- 2015: Melbourne, VIC – (Crown)
- 2016: Melbourne, VIC – (Crown)
- 2017: Adelaide, SA – Adelaide Oval
- 2018: Melbourne, VIC – (Crown)
- 2019: Melbourne, VIC – (Crown)
- 2020: Broadcast-only event (COVID-19 pandemic)
- 2021: Broadcast-only event (COVID-19 pandemic)
- 2022: Melbourne, VIC – (Crown)
- 2023: Melbourne, VIC – (Crown)
- 2024: Melbourne, VIC – Centrepiece
- 2025: Melbourne, VIC
- 2026: Melbourne, VIC – Crown Palladium

== Criticism ==
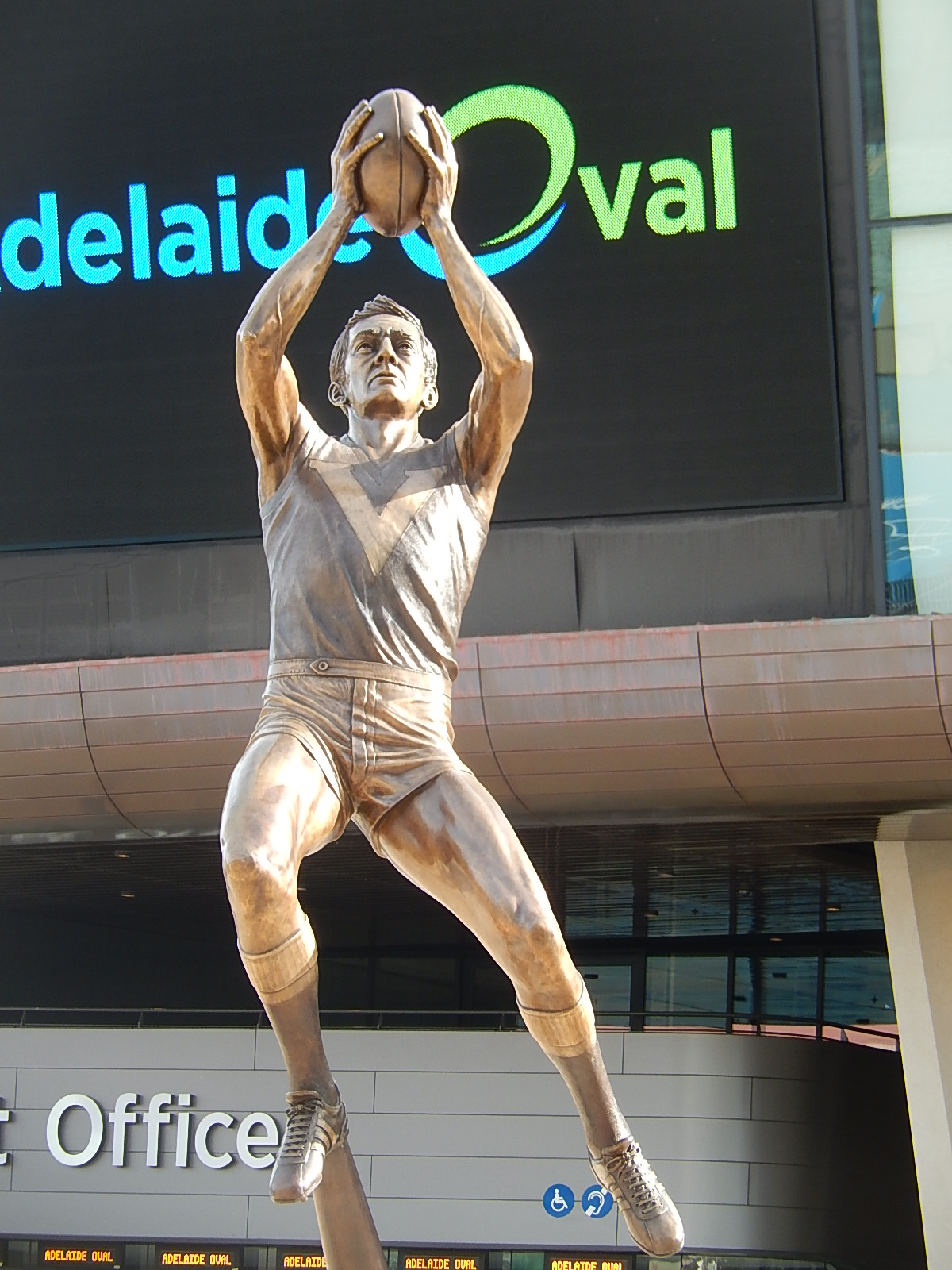
Until 2021, Barrie Robran was the only Legend who had not played club football in Victoria, a circumstance cited in criticism of the Hall of Fame's historical Victorian emphasis.

The Hall of Fame has been criticised for a perceived bias towards figures from Victoria and for the under-representation of prominent figures from other states and earlier eras. In 2011, Western Australian football historian and former selector Brian Atkinson described the Hall's pro-Victorian bias as "incredible", while Brian Peake criticised the difficulty faced by Western Australian candidates seeking recognition.

In 2022, InDaily discussed the limited recognition afforded to prominent South Australian and early-era figures. The article cited ABC sports reporter James Coventry, who had noted in 2018 that 17 of the 28 people then recognised as Legends had been active as players or coaches in 1969.

InDaily quoted Coventry as saying:

I would never suggest Kevin Sheedy is not a worthy Legend, he absolutely is, but you have to think something's gone seriously wrong with past selection for the #HallofFame to now be in a position where 17 of its 28 Legends were active in 1969.

== Declined inductions ==
In 2021, Adam Goodes and Garry McIntosh declined induction into the Hall of Fame.

Goodes declined because of what he regarded as the AFL's inadequate support and remedial action in response to the racial abuse he experienced during the final years of his playing career. McIntosh said that he "did not play the game for personal honours".

== Removed inductees ==
Barry Cable was removed from the Hall of Fame on 27 June 2023 and had his Legend status revoked after he was found civilly liable for sexually abusing a child.

Nicky Winmar was removed from the Hall of Fame with immediate effect on 14 July 2026 after he was found guilty of three assault charges involving violence against a woman.

Player	Club	State	Playing career	Games played (goals)	Year inducted	Year removed	Legend status
Barry Cable	Perth	Western Australia	1962–1969, 1971–1973	225 (325)	1996	2023	Revoked
Barry Cable	North Melbourne	Victoria	1970, 1974–1977	115 (133)	1996	2023	Revoked
Barry Cable	East Perth	Western Australia	1978–1979	43 (50)	1996	2023	Revoked
Nicky Winmar	South Fremantle	Western Australia	1983–1986	58 (98)	2022	2026	—
Nicky Winmar	St Kilda	Victoria	1987–1998	230 (283)	2022	2026	—
Nicky Winmar	Western Bulldogs	Victoria	1999	21 (34)	2022	2026	—

== See also ==
- South Australian Football Hall of Fame (established 2002)
- Tasmanian Football Hall of Fame (established 2005)
- West Australian Football Hall of Fame (established 2004)
