= Rod McGregor =

Australian rules footballer and broadcaster

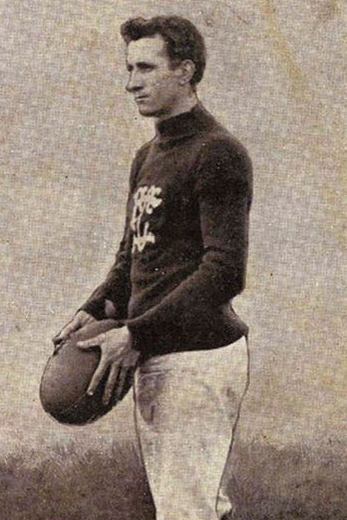
- McGregor in 1910

Personal information
- Full name: Roderick McGregor
- Born: 19 October 1882; Katamatite, Victoria
- Died: 2 August 1962 (aged 79); Canterbury, Victoria
- Original team: Essendon Association
- Height: 178 cm (5 ft 10 in)
- Weight: 75 kg (165 lb)
- Position: Centre

Playing career^{1}
Years	Club	Games (Goals)
1905–1912; 1914–1920	Carlton	236 (26)

Representative team honours
Years	Team	Games (Goals)
?–?	Victoria	3 (0)
- ^{1} Playing statistics correct to the end of 1920.

Career highlights
- VFL Premiership: 1906, 1908, 1914, 1915

Rod McGregor (19 October 1882 – 2 August 1962) was an Australian rules footballer for the Carlton Football Club in the (then) Victorian Football League and, later, a broadcaster.

== Family ==
Son of Alexander McGregor and Eliza McGregor, he was born on 19 October 1882. He married Alice May Bickford (1885–1963), the sister of Albert Bickford and Edric Bickford, in 1911.

== Football ==
Equally skilled with both feet, and an outstanding centreman with the ability to pass accurately to team-mates and elude opponents, he played his first senior match with Carlton against Collingwood on 13 May 1905 (round 2), aged 22, and played his 236th and last senior match, against St Kilda, on 1 May 1920 (round 1), aged 37, when he was forced to retire following a serious knee injury.

=== 1905–1912 ===
He played in the 1906 and 1908 winning grand final sides, missed the 1907 premiership triumph over South Melbourne after breaking his nose in the previous week's Semi-Final against St Kilda.

=== 1913 ===
During the 1912 Preliminary Final, McGregor was not playing well, and Carlton captain Jack Wells asked him to play on the forward line. McGregor refused; for disobeying the captain, the Carlton Committee suspended McGregor from the Carlton team for 12 months and refused to grant him a clearance for 1913.

"Late in the [1912 Preliminary Final], Carlton skipper Jack Wells told McGregor to push forward, but [McGregor] refused and the pair argued heatedly. Later, the matter was raised at committee level, and it was decided to make an example of one of the club’s favourite sons. McGregor was suspended for twelve months, sparking a furore within, and outside the club. To his immense credit, McGregor refused to inflame the issue, and while he did train for some time at [VFA club] North Melbourne, his heart was always with the Blues and he was back again, aged 30, in 1914."

=== 1914–1920 ===
Following his suspension, he played his first match (his 146th career game) against South Melbourne in round 4).

His 236 career matches for Carlton was a club record until it was broken by John Nicholls in Round 16 of 1970.

== Broadcaster ==
Working on-air with Melbourne radio station 3LO as early as 1927, McGregor was a pioneer of football radio broadcasts.

== Australian Football Hall of Fame ==
In 1996 McGregor was inducted into the Australian Football Hall of Fame.

== See also ==
- 1908 Melbourne Carnival
