= List of Fitzroy Football Club coaches =

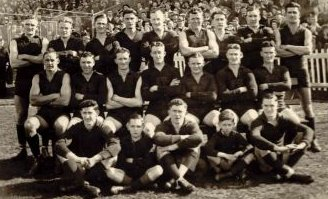
Members of Fitzroy's 1944 premiership side, with coach Fred Hughson at centre.

This is a list of people who coached the Fitzroy Football Club in a senior Australian Football League (AFL) game. Playing the sport of Australian rules football, the Fitzroy Football Club was formed in September 1883, and began playing in the Victorian Football Association (VFA) the following season. Originally based at the Brunswick Street Oval, the club won its first VFA premiership in 1895, but quit the league two years later to join the newly formed Victorian Football League (VFL). Fitzroy won consecutive VFL premierships between 1898 and 1899 and between 1904 and 1905. Prior to the 1911 season, there was no official position of coach. Rather, tactics and positioning were formulating by senior players, including club captains, and selectors. Former player Geoff Moriarty was appointed the club's inaugural coach in 1911, but was replaced by Percy Parratt in 1913, who acted as playing coach. Further premierships were won under Parratt in 1913 and George Holden in 1916, with Vic Belcher captain-coaching the club to the 1922 premiership. Up until the end of the Second World War, the position of coach was almost always filled by the current captain or an ex-Fitzroy player. Frank Maher, an ex-Essendon player, coached the club in 1932 and 1933, but was followed by several one-season coaches. Fitzroy were extremely unsuccessful at this point in time, and did not make the finals between 1924 and 1943, when captain Fred Hughson was appointed coach. The club's eighth and last VFL premiership came in 1944, under Hughson. A gradual movement towards non-playing coaches came after the Second World War. Bill Stephen, Fitzroy's longest-serving coach, coached the club on three occasions – from 1955 to 1957, 1965 to 1970, and 1979 to 1980 – for a total of 212 games. Fitzroy's last period of success came in the 1980s, with the club making the finals on five occasions between 1979 and 1986. The club merged with the Brisbane Bears to form the Brisbane Lions at the conclusion of the 1996 season, having gone through three coaches in its final two seasons, finishing last in each.

== Coaches ==
#	Coach	Seasons	G	W	D	L	W%	FG	FW	FD	FL	FW%	GF	P	Ref
1	Geoff Moriarty	1911–1912	36	20	0	16	55.56	—	—	—	—	—	0	0	
2	Percy Parratt *	1913–1915	52	39	1	12	75.96	6	3	0	3	50.00	1	1	
3	George Holden *	1916–1919	54	24	2	28	46.30	6	5	0	1	83.33	2	1	
4	Ted Melling †	1919	9	4	1	4	50.00	—	—	—	—	—	0	0	
	Percy Parratt	1920–1921	32	20	2	10	65.63	1	0	0	1	0.00	0	0	
5	Vic Belcher *	1922–1927	93	49	2	42	53.76	9	6	0	3	66.67	2	1	
6	Chris Lethbridge	1925	17	12	0	5	70.59	—	—	—	—	—	0	0	
7	Gordon Rattray	1928	18	7	0	11	38.89	—	—	—	—	—	0	0	
8	Jimmy Freake	1929	8	1	0	7	12.50	—	—	—	—	—	0	0	
9	Doug Ringrose †	1929	10	2	0	8	20.00	—	—	—	—	—	0	0	
10	Colin Niven	1930–1931	36	25	0	11	30.56	—	—	—	—	—	0	0	
11	Frank Maher	1932–1933	36	14	1	21	40.28	—	—	—	—	—	0	0	
12	Jack Cashman	1934	2	1	0	1	50.00	—	—	—	—	—	0	0	
13	Len Wigraft †	1934	16	6	0	10	37.50	—	—	—	—	—	0	0	
14	Percy Rowe	1935	18	8	1	9	47.22	—	—	—	—	—	0	0	
15	Haydn Bunton	1936	18	2	0	16	11.11	—	—	—	—	—	0	0	
	Gordon Rattray	1937–1939	54	18	1	35	34.26	—	—	—	—	—	0	0	
16	Dan Minogue	1940–1942	51	25	0	26	49.02	—	—	—	—	—	0	0	
17	Fred Hughson *	1943–1947	96	60	2	34	63.54	6	4	0	2	66.67	1	1	
18	Norm Hillard †	1945	1	0	0	1	0.00	—	—	—	—	—	0	0	
19	Charles Cameron	1948	19	9	0	10	47.37	—	—	—	—	—	0	0	
20	Norm Smith	1949–1951	55	30	2	23	56.36	—	—	—	—	—	0	0	
21	Allan Ruthven	1952–1954	57	28	1	28	50.00	2	1	0	1	50.00	0	0	
22	Bill Stephen	1955–1957	53	19	0	34	35.85	—	—	—	—	—	0	0	
23	Frank Curcio †	1956	1	0	0	1	0.00	—	—	—	—	—	0	0	
24	Len Smith	1958–1962	92	50	2	40	55.43	3	0	0	3	0.00	0	0	
25	Arthur Edwards †	1961	1	1	0	0	100.00	—	—	—	—	—	0	0	
26	Kevin Murray	1963–1964	34	0	0	34	0.00	—	—	—	—	—	0	0	
27	Wally Clark †	1963	1	1	0	0	100.00	—	—	—	—	—	0	0	
28	Tommy Williams †	1964	1	0	0	1	0.00	—	—	—	—	—	0	0	
	Bill Stephen	1965–1970	115	29	0	86	25.22	—	—	—	—	—	0	0	
29	Ray Slocum †	1968	1	0	0	1	0.00	—	—	—	—	—	0	0	
30	Graham Donaldson	1971–1974	85	34	1	50	40.59	—	—	—	—	—	0	0	
31	Graham Campbell †	1974	3	0	0	3	00.00	—	—	—	—	—	0	0	
32	Kevin Rose	1975–1977	66	22	0	44	33.33	—	—	—	—	—	0	0	
	Graham Campbell	1978	22	8	0	14	36.36	—	—	—	—	—	0	0	
	Bill Stephen	1979–1980	44	19	1	24	44.32	2	1	0	1	50.00	0	0	
33	Robert Walls	1981–1985	115	60	1	54	52.61	5	1	0	4	20.00	0	0	
34	David Parkin	1986–1988	69	30	0	39	43.48	3	2	0	1	66.67	0	0	
35	Rod Austin	1989–1990	44	19	0	25	43.18	—	—	—	—	—	0	0	
36	Robert Shaw	1991–1994	86	28	0	58	32.56	—	—	—	—	—	0	0	
37	Bernie Quinlan	1995	19	2	0	17	10.53	—	—	—	—	—	0	0	
38	Alan McConnell †	1995	3	0	0	3	0.00	—	—	—	—	—	0	0	
39	Michael Nunan	1996	14	1	0	13	7.14	—	—	—	—	—	0	0	
	Alan McConnell †	1996	8	0	0	8	0.00	—	—	—	—	—	0	0	

=== Key ===
#	Number		
G	Total games coached	FG	Finals games coached
W	Total wins	FW	Finals wins
L	Total losses	FL	Finals losses
D	Total draws	FD	Finals draws
W%	Overall winning percentage	FW%	Finals winning percentage
GF	Grand Final appearances		
P	Premierships		
†	Caretaker coach		
*	Premiership coach		

== See also ==
List of Brisbane Bears coaches

List of Brisbane Lions coaches
