= Tony Franklin =

Tony Franklin may refer to:

- Tony Franklin (Australian footballer) (born 1950), Australian rules footballer
- Tony Franklin (baseball) (born 1950), American baseball player and manager
- Tony Franklin (American football coach) (born 1957), American football coach
- Tony Franklin (musician) (born 1962), British bass player and keyboardist
- Tony Franklin (kicker) (born 1956), American football kicker
