= Take the Steps =

- Promotional poster for the film
- Directed by: Luke Winzar & James Moriarty
- Starring: Craig McRae; Darcy Moore; Nick Daicos; Scott Pendlebury
- Production companies: Collingwood Football Club; AFL Studios
- Distributed by: Collingwood Football Club
- Release date: 28 February 2024
- Running time: 83 minutes
- Country: Australia
- Language: English

Take the Steps is a 2024 Australian sports documentary film produced by the Collingwood Football Club in association with the Australian Football League's film production arm, AFL Studios. It tracks Collingwood's 2023 AFL season through the perspective of four key club figures as the team strives towards—and eventually wins—the premiership.

The film was directed by Luke Winzar and James Moriarty, and follows the journeys of Collingwood coach Craig McRae, captain Darcy Moore, young gun Nick Daicos and veteran Scott Pendlebury through piece-to-camera interviews interspersed with game-day and off-field footage. It was released exclusively via Australian cinema chain Hoyts, and premiered in the franchise's Melbourne Central location on 28 February 2024.

== Cast ==
All as themselves:

- Craig McRae
- Darcy Moore
- Nick Daicos
- Scott Pendlebury

== Reception ==
In a review written for Guardian Australia, sports journalist Jonathan Horn was generally positive towards the documentary, noting that despite its events telling a "well-thumbed story", the film "taps into something else... well beyond old-school thinking and home-ground editing." He praised Take the Steps' ability to display the apparent ease in which Collingwood operated throughout the season, highlighting one instance of the club's relaxed attitude where the mother of forward Beau McCreery, Julie, addressed the team before a Mother's Day match. Horn reserved criticism for the "winner's cut" nature of the documentary, which shied away from the omission of defender John Noble prior to the finals series after the popular clubman had played 83 consecutive games for Collingwood.

== See also ==
- Year of the Dogs
