= Albert Bickford =

Australian rules footballer and umpire

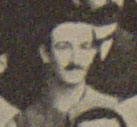
- Bickford during his Carlton career

Personal information
- Full name: Albert Bartlett Bickford
- Born: 24 August 1887; Flemington, Victoria
- Died: 23 December 1971 (aged 84); Croydon, Victoria
- Original team: Essendon Association

Playing career^{1}
Years	Club	Games (Goals)	
1906–1907	Carlton	2 (0)	
1908–1909	Melbourne	9 (0)	
1909–1910	North Melb (VFA)		
1914	Hawthorn (VFA)		
Total		11 (0)	

Umpiring career
Years	League	Role	Games
1921	VFL	Boundary umpire	1
- ^{1} Playing statistics correct to the end of 1914.

Albert Bartlett Bickford (24 August 1887 – 23 December 1971) was an Australian rules footballer who played with Carlton and Melbourne in the Victorian Football League (VFL).

== Family ==
Albert Bickford, the third of four children born to confectioner Edric Dillon Bickford (1857–1928) and Lucy Steane Woodbridge (1859–1949), was born at Flemington on 24 August 1887.

On 28 October 1909, he married Jessie Wood at the North Melbourne Church of Christ.

Bickford is the older brother of Carlton and Essendon footballer Edric Bickford, brother-in-law of former Carlton captain Rod McGregor and uncle of Melbourne premiership player George Bickford.

== Football career ==
=== Carlton ===
Originally from Essendon Association, Bickford made one appearance for Carlton in each of the 1906 and 1907 seasons, both Carlton premiership years.

=== Melbourne ===
Bickford then transferred to Melbourne and played eight games in the 1908 VFL season, followed by a single appearance in 1909.

=== North Melbourne ===
In June 1909, Bickford moved to North Melbourne, then playing in the Victorian Football Association (VFA). He played for North Melbourne in both the second half of the 1909 season and in 1910.

=== Hawthorn ===
In 1914, Bickford played for Hawthorn, again in the Victorian Football Association (VFA).

== Umpiring career ==
Bickford was appointed to the VFL list of field umpires in 1921. In round one that season, as a boundary umpire, he made his only appearance in a VFL match - Richmond versus Carlton - earning Heritage Number 129. Between 1921 and 1929 he umpired 120 country matches as a field umpire including the 1926 Heathcote District Football Association Grand Final.
