= Geoff Moriarty =

Australian rules footballer and coach

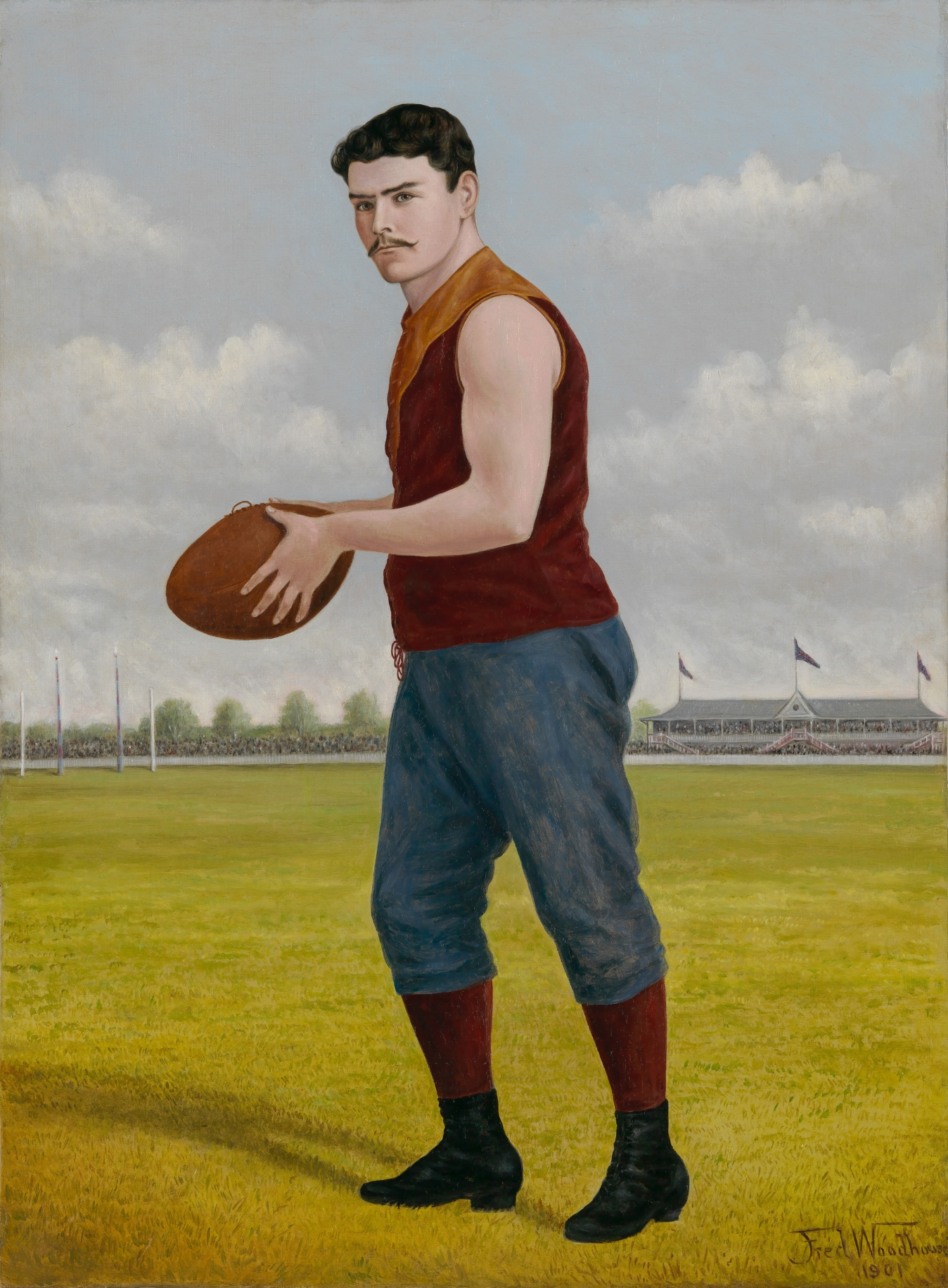
- Painting of Moriarty by Frederick Woodhouse Junior, 1901, held at the National Gallery of Victoria

Personal information
- Full name: Geoffrey John Moriarty
- Born: 28 October 1871; Alexandra, Victoria
- Died: 29 October 1948 (aged 77); Fitzroy, Victoria

Playing career^{1}
Years	Club	Games (Goals)
1891	Carlton (VFA)	14 (1)
1892–1896	Fitzroy (VFA)	81 (12)
1897–1907	Fitzroy	106 (0)
Total		201 (13)

Coaching career
Years	Club	Games (W–L–D)
1911–1912	Fitzroy	36 (20–16–0)
- ^{1} Playing statistics correct to the end of 1912.

Career highlights
- VFA premiership player: 1895; 2× VFL premiership player: 1899, 1905

Geoffrey John Moriarty (28 October 1871 – 29 October 1948) was an Australian rules footballer who played for the Fitzroy Football Club in the VFA and Victorian Football League (VFL).

The father of Fitzroy full-forward Jack Moriarty, Geoff played at the opposite end of the ground, and after a year with Carlton, he crossed to Fitzroy, becoming a premiership winning fullback. He was a member of Fitzroy premiership sides in 1895 in the VFA, and in 1899 and 1905, also playing in their losing Grand Finals in 1900 and 1906.

In 1911 Moriarty became Fitzroy's first ever official coach, with the club finishing fifth on both of his two seasons in charge.

== See also ==
- List of Fitzroy Football Club coaches
