= List of Sydney Swans coaches =

The following is a list of coaches who have coached the Sydney Swans at a game of Australian rules football in the Australian Football League (AFL), formally the VFL. They were known as South Melbourne prior to their relocation to Sydney in 1982.

== VFL/AFL ==
#	Coach	G	W	L	D	Win%	FG	FW	FL	FD	F Win%	GF	P	Years
1	Charlie Ricketts	41	30	11	0	73.17	5	2	3	0	40.00	2	1	1909–1912
2	Bill Thomas	39	26	12	1	66.67	0	0	0	0	—N/a	0	0	1910–1911
3	Harvey Kelly	19	14	4	1	73.68	0	0	0	0	—N/a	0	0	1913
4	Vic Belcher	53	31	21	1	58.49	0	0	0	0	—N/a	1	0	1914–1917
5	Henry Elms	33	27	6	0	81.82	0	0	0	0	—N/a	1	1	1918–1919
6	Herb Howson	33	27	6	0	81.82	3	2	1	0	66.67	1	1	1918–1919
7	Arthur Hiskins	16	7	9	0	43.75	0	0	0	0	—N/a	0	0	1920
8	Artie Wood	16	5	10	1	31.25	0	0	0	0	—N/a	0	0	1921
9	Roy Cazaly	52	12	38	2	23.08	0	0	0	0	—N/a	0	0	1922–1938
10	Charlie Pannam	108	54	54	0	50.00	5	2	3	0	40.00	0	0	1923–1928
11	Jim Caldwell	4	1	3	0	25.00	0	0	0	0	—N/a	0	0	1929
12	Fred Fleiter	14	6	8	0	42.86	0	0	0	0	—N/a	0	0	1929
13	Paddy Scanlan	36	18	18	0	50.00	0	0	0	0	—N/a	0	0	1930–1931
14	Johnny Leonard	19	13	6	0	68.42	1	0	1	0	0.00	0	0	1932
15	Jack Bisset	80	63	17	0	78.75	10	6	4	0	60.00	4	1	1933–1936
16	Brighton Diggins†	2	2	0	0	100.00	0	0	0	0	—N/a	0	0	1935
17	Herbie Matthews	90	27	62	1	30.00	0	0	0	0	—N/a	0	0	1939–1957
18	Jack Baggott	18	7	11	0	38.89	0	0	0	0	—N/a	0	0	1940
19	Joe Kelly	68	35	33	0	51.47	2	1	1	0	50.00	0	0	1941–1944
20	Bill Adams	70	39	30	1	55.71	2	1	1	0	50.00	1	0	1945–1948
21	Jack Hale	28	9	19	0	32.14	0	0	0	0	—N/a	0	0	1948–1949
22	Gordon Lane	55	24	29	2	43.64	0	0	0	0	—N/a	0	0	1950–1952
23	Laurie Nash	18	9	9	0	50.00	0	0	0	0	—N/a	0	0	1953
24	Ron Clegg	36	15	21	0	41.67	0	0	0	0	—N/a	0	0	1958–59
25	Bill Faul	36	12	24	0	33.33	0	0	0	0	—N/a	0	0	1960–1961
26	Noel McMahen	54	9	45	0	16.67	0	0	0	0	—N/a	0	0	1962–1964
27	Bob Skilton	35	16	19	0	45.71	0	0	0	0	—N/a	0	0	1965–1966
28	Tommy Lahiff†	1	0	1	0	0.00	0	0	0	0	—N/a	0	0	1965
29	Alan Miller	38	11	25	2	28.95	0	0	0	0	—N/a	0	0	1967–1968
30	Norm Smith	87	26	61	0	29.89	1	0	1	0	0.00	0	0	1969–1972
31	Graeme John	66	15	50	1	22.73	0	0	0	0	—N/a	0	0	1973–1975
32	Ian Stewart	111	49	61	1	44.14	1	0	1	0	0.00	0	0	1976–1977; 1979–1981
33	Des Tuddenham	22	9	13	0	40.91	0	0	0	0	—N/a	0	0	1978
34	Ricky Quade	57	25	32	0	43.86	0	0	0	0	—N/a	0	0	1982–1984
35	Tony Franklin†	1	0	1	0	0.00	0	0	0	0	—N/a	0	0	1984
36	Bob Hammond	8	3	5	0	37.50	0	0	0	0	—N/a	0	0	1984
37	John Northey	22	6	16	0	27.27	0	0	0	0	—N/a	0	0	1985
38	Tom Hafey	70	43	27	0	61.43	4	0	4	0	0.00	0	0	1986–1988
39	Col Kinnear	66	23	42	1	34.85	0	0	0	0	—N/a	0	0	1989–1991
40	Gary Buckenara	25	3	21	1	12.00	0	0	0	0	—N/a	0	0	1992–1993
41	Brett Scott†	2	0	2	0	0.00	0	0	0	0	—N/a	0	0	1993
42	Ron Barassi	59	13	46	0	22.03	0	0	0	0	—N/a	0	0	1993–1995
43	Rodney Eade	152	81	69	2	53.29	8	3	5	0	37.50	1	0	1996–2002
44	Paul Roos	202	116	84	2	57.43	16	9	7	0	56.25	2	1	2002–2010
45	John Longmire	333	208	122	3	62.91	28	14	14	0	50.00	5	1	2011–2024
46	Dean Cox	23	12	11	0	52.17	0	0	0	0	—N/a	0	0	2025–

== AFL Women's ==
#	Coach	G	W	L	D	Win%	FG	FW	FL	FD	F Win%	GF	P	Years
1	Scott Gowans	44	16	28	0	36.36	2	1	1	0	50.00	0	0	2022 (S7)–2025
2	Colin O'Riordan	0	0	0	0	—N/a	0	0	0	0	—N/a	0	0	2026–

== Key ==
#	Number of coaches		
G	Total games coached	FG	Finals games coached
W	Total wins	FW	Finals wins
L	Total losses	FL	Finals losses
D	Total draws	FD	Finals draws
Win%	Overall winning percentage	F Win%	Finals winning percentage
GF	Grand Final appearances: number of AFL Grand Final appearances achieved by the coach		
P	Premierships: number of premierships achieved by the coach		
†	Caretaker coach		
