= List of Essendon Football Club coaches =

The following is a list of coaches who have coached the Essendon Football Club at a game of Australian rules football in the Australian Football League (AFL), formerly the VFL.

== VFL/AFL ==
Key:

C = Coached
W = Won
L = Lost
D = Drew
* = Caretaker coach

Statistics current as of end of 2026 season.

No.	Coach	C	W	L	D	Career Span
1	Dave Smith	39	26	13	0	1908–1909
2	Allan Belcher	19	12	7	0	1910
3	Jack Worrall	243	156	85	2	1911–1915, 1918–1920
4	Percy Ogden	20	3	15	2	1920–1921
5	Sid Barker	43	31	11	1	1922–1924
6	Sam Gravenall	12	7	4	1	1922
7	Frank Maher	56	32	23	1	1925–1927
8	Charlie Hardy	54	30	23	1	1928–1930
9	Garnet Campbell	54	22	32	0	1931–1933
10	Charlie May	36	12	24	0	1934–1935
11	Jack Baggott	60	22	38	0	1936–1939
12	Dick Reynolds	415	275	134	6	1939–1960
13	Harry Hunter	2	2	0	0	1939
14	Les Griggs*	1	0	1	0	1941
15	Elton Plummer*	7	4	2	1	1944
16	Cec Ruddell*	2	0	2	0	1945–1946
17	Alan Thaw*	1	1	0	0	1959
18	John Coleman	133	90	40	3	1961–1967
19	Greg Sewell*	1	1	0	0	1965
20	Jack Clarke	65	33	30	2	1968–1970
21	John Birt	22	4	17	1	1971
22	Des Tuddenham	90	47	43	0	1972–1975
23	Bill Stephen	44	16	27	1	1976–1977
24	Barry Davis	67	30	36	1	1978–1980
25	Kevin Sheedy	634	386	242	4	1981–2007
26	Gary O'Donnell*	1	0	0	1	2006
27	Matthew Knights	67	25	41	1	2008–2010
28	James Hird	85	41	43	1	2011–2013; 2015
29	Simon Goodwin*	1	0	1	0	2013
30	Mark Thompson	23	12	10	1	2014
31	Matthew Egan*	3	1	2	0	2015
32	John Worsfold	107	45	61	1	2016–2020
33	Ben Rutten	44	17	27	0	2021–2022
34	Blake Caracella*	1	1	0	0	2022
35	Brad Scott	80	29	50	1	2023–2026
36	Dean Solomon	12	1	11	0	2026
37	Mark McVeigh	0	0	0	0	2027–Present

== AFL Women's ==
Season(s)	Coach	Notes
2022 (S7)–	Natalie Wood	
