= List of Brisbane Bears coaches =

The following is a list of coaches to have coached the Brisbane Bears, a now-defunct Australian rules football club which played in the VFL (from 1987 to 1989) and the AFL (1990–1996).

(sortableproblem)

No.	Coach	P	W	L	D	W%	Years
1	Peter Knights	59	16	43	0	27.12	1987–1989
2	Paul Feltham	7	5	2	0	71.43	1989
3	Norm Dare	22	4	18	0	18.18	1990
4	Robert Walls	109	30	78	1	27.52	1991–1995
5	John Northey	25	17	7	1	68.00	1996

Key:

P = Played
W = Won
L = Lost
D = Drew
W% = Win percentage

== See also ==
List of Fitzroy Football Club coaches

List of Brisbane Lions coaches
