= 1948 SANFL Grand Final =

Norwood	West Torrens
15.16 (106)	6.13 (49)
	1	2	3	4
NOR	5.4 (34)	5.6 (36)	9.14 (68)	15.16 (106)
WT	1.4 (10)	3.9 (27)	4.9 (33)	6.13 (49)
- Date: Saturday, 2 October
- Stadium: Adelaide Oval
- Attendance: 48,755

The 1948 SANFL Grand Final was an Australian rules football competition. Norwood beat West Adelaide 106 to 49.
