= List of Carlton Football Club coaches =

The following is a list of coaches who have coached the Carlton Football Club at a game of Australian rules football in the Australian Football League (AFL), formerly the VFL.

== VFL/AFL ==
- Statistics are correct to the end of Round 24 2026

| No. | Coach | G | W | L | D | W% | Years |
|---|---|---|---|---|---|---|---|
| 1 | Jack Worrall | 144 | 100 | 43 | 1 | 69.79 | 1902–1909 |
| 2 | Fred Elliott | 47 | 34 | 11 | 2 | 74.47 | 1909–1911 |
| 3 | Norm Clark | 150 | 102 | 42 | 6 | 70.00 | 1912, 1914–1918, 1920–1922 |
| 4 | Jack Wells | 18 | 9 | 8 | 1 | 52.78 | 1913 |
| 5 | Viv Valentine | 17 | 10 | 7 | 0 | 58.82 | 1919 |
| 6 | Horrie Clover | 45 | 26 | 18 | 1 | 58.89 | 1922–1923, 1927 |
| 7 | Percy Parratt | 16 | 5 | 10 | 1 | 34.38 | 1924 |
| 8 | Jim Caldwell | 15 | 5 | 10 | 0 | 33.33 | 1925 |
| 9 | Paddy O'Brien | 2 | 0 | 2 | 0 | 0.00 | 1925 |
| 10 | Ray Brew | 37 | 22 | 15 | 0 | 59.46 | 1926, 1928 |
| 11 | Dan Minogue | 117 | 85 | 32 | 0 | 72.65 | 1929–1934 |
| 12 | Frank Maher | 38 | 26 | 11 | 1 | 69.74 | 1935–1936 |
| 13 | Percy Rowe | 18 | 11 | 7 | 0 | 61.11 | 1937 |
| 14 | Brighton Diggins | 56 | 38 | 18 | 0 | 67.86 | 1938–1940 |
| 15 | Percy Bentley | 281 | 167 | 110 | 4 | 60.14 | 1941–1955 |
| 16 | Jim Francis | 55 | 29 | 25 | 1 | 53.64 | 1956–1958 |
| 17 | Ken Hands | 114 | 60 | 51 | 3 | 53.95 | 1959–1964 |
| 18 | Ron Barassi | 147 | 99 | 47 | 1 | 67.69 | 1965–1971 |
| 19 | John Nicholls | 95 | 61 | 31 | 3 | 65.79 | 1972–1975 |
| 20 | Keith McKenzie | 2 | 2 | 0 | 0 | 100.00 | 1972, 1975 |
| 21 | Ian Thorogood | 46 | 29 | 16 | 1 | 64.13 | 1976–1977 |
| 22 | Ian Stewart | 3 | 1 | 2 | 0 | 33.33 | 1978 |
| 23 | Sergio Silvagni | 3 | 0 | 3 | 0 | 0.00 | 1978 |
| 24 | Alex Jesaulenko | 76 | 53 | 22 | 1 | 70.39 | 1978–1979, 1989–1990 |
| 25 | Peter Jones | 24 | 17 | 7 | 0 | 70.83 | 1980 |
| 26 | David Parkin | 355 | 219 | 134 | 2 | 61.97 | 1981–1985, 1991–2000 |
| 27 | Robert Walls | 84 | 55 | 29 | 0 | 65.48 | 1986–1989 |
| 28 | Wayne Brittain | 46 | 18 | 28 | 0 | 39.13 | 2001–2002 |
| 29 | Denis Pagan | 104 | 25 | 77 | 2 | 24.04 | 2003–2007 |
| 30 | Brett Ratten | 120 | 60 | 59 | 1 | 50.00 | 2007–2012 |
| 31 | Mick Malthouse | 54 | 20 | 33 | 1 | 37.04 | 2013–2015 |
| 32 | John Barker | 14 | 3 | 11 | 0 | 23.08 | 2015 |
| 33 | Brendon Bolton | 77 | 16 | 61 | 0 | 20.77 | 2016–2019 |
| 34 | David Teague | 50 | 21 | 29 | 0 | 44.00 | 2019–2021 |
| 35 | Michael Voss | 103 | 49 | 53 | 1 | 47.57 | 2022–2026 |
| 36 | Josh Fraser | 13 | 10 | 2 | 1 | 80.77 | 2026- |

Key:

G = Games
W = Won
L = Lost
D = Drew
W% = Win percentage

== AFL Women's ==
| Season(s) | Coach | Notes |
|---|---|---|
| 2017–2018 | Damien Keeping | |
| 2019–2022 (S7) | Daniel Harford | |
| 2023– | Mathew Buck | |
