= Jack Wells (footballer) =

Australian rules footballer and coach (1883–1966)

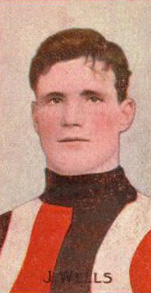

Personal information
- Full name: John Wells
- Nickname: Balla
- Born: 4 January 1883; Stawell, Victoria
- Died: 17 December 1966 (aged 83); Fitzroy, Victoria
- Original team: Guildford (WAFA Juniors)
- Height: 177 cm (5 ft 10 in)
- Weight: 89 kg (196 lb)
- Positions: Full-forward, centre, ruckman

Playing career^{1}
Years	Club	Games (Goals)
1898	Rovers	11 (unknown)
1898–1904	Perth	unknown
1905	Kalgoorlie City	unknown
1906–09	St Kilda	39 (4)
1910–14	Carlton	66 (51)
1915	North Melbourne	unknown

Representative team honours
Years	Team	Games (Goals)
unknown	VFL	4 (unknown)

Coaching career
Years	Club	Games (W–L–D)
1913	Carlton	18 (9–1–8)
- ^{1} Playing statistics correct to the end of 1915.

Career highlights
- Perth leading goalkicker 1904; GFA Champion Player Award 1905; St Kilda captain 1907–08; VFL representative team 1910; Carlton captain 1912–13; Carlton coach 1913

John "Jack" Wells (4 January 1883 – 17 December 1966) was an Australian rules footballer who played for Rovers and Perth in the Western Australian Football Association (WAFA), Kalgoorlie City in the Goldfields Football Association (GFA), St Kilda and Carlton in the Victorian Football League (VFL), and North Melbourne in the Victorian Football Association (VFA).

== Career ==
Born in Stawell, Victoria on 4 January 1883 to William Wells and Jane Mary Reid, Wells played his early football in Western Australia where he spent time in both Kalgoorlie and Perth.

Originally playing for Rovers, he switched to Perth after the club folded midway through the 1898 season. He represented the Perth Football Club in their inaugural WAFA season and topped their goal kicking in 1904. His tally that year included what was then a club record 11 goals in a match against Subiaco. Before crossing to the VFL he played in the Goldfields Football Association with Kalgoorlie City and was the league's 'Best and fairest' winner in 1905.

He was used in a variety of position during his career, mostly as a centreman, up forward and in the ruck. In his four seasons at St Kilda he struggled with injuries but captained the club in 1907, to their first ever finals appearance, and at the beginning of 1908. He joined Carlton in 1910 and played in their losing Grand Final side that year. In 1912 he was appointed captain and the following season captained-coached Carlton to sixth place. A four-time Victorian interstate representative, Wells was picked to captain his state in a match against South Australia in 1912 but had withdraw due to an injury.

After leaving Carlton, Wells finished his career in the VFA at North Melbourne.
