= Ted Melling =

Personal information
- Full name: Ted Melling

Playing career
Years	Club	Games (Goals)
1885-1895	Fitzroy	193 (27)

Coaching career
Years	Club	Games (W–L–D)
1919	Fitzroy	9 (4–4–1)

Career highlights
- VFA premiership player (1895)

Ted Melling was an Australian rules football coach who coached Fitzroy in the Victorian Football League (VFL).

When the incumbent captain-coach, George Holden, injured his thigh at the start of the 1919 VFL season, he was restricted to being an off-field coach, and after seven games he was replaced by Melling. Under Melling, Fitzroy managed four wins and a draw from their nine games, only narrowly missing out on a place in the finals.

Melling had played 193 games for the club between 1885 and 1895, being part of their 1895 VFA premiership team: his career games total stood as a club record until it was broken by Percy Parratt in the 1923 Preliminary Final.
