= List of Brisbane Lions coaches =

The following is a list of coaches to have coached the Brisbane Lions, an Australian rules football club that fields teams in the AFL (1997–present) and AFL Women's (2017–present).

== AFL ==
Statistics are correct to the end of the 2026 season.

#	Coach	Seasons	Total games					Finals games				Achievements
#	Coach	Seasons	G	W	L	D	W%	G	W	L	W%	Achievements
1	John Northey	1997–1998	34	12	21	1	35.3	1	0	1	0.0	
2	Leigh Matthews	1999–2008	237	142	92	3	59.9	18	14	4	77.8	Premierships: 2001, 2002, 2003; Runners-up: 2004
3	Michael Voss	2009–2013	109	43	65	1	39.4	2	1	1	50.0	
4	Justin Leppitsch	2014–2016	66	14	52	0	21.2	0	0	0	—N/a	
5	Chris Fagan	2017–2026	243	148	93	2	60.9	24	15	9	62.5	Premierships: 2024, 2025, 2026; Runners-up: 2023; Allan Jeans Award: 2019, 2024, 2025
6	Cameron Bruce	2027–present	0	0	0	0	—N/a	0	0	0	—N/a	

=== AFL acting/caretaker coaches ===
No.	Coach	Season	GC	W	L	D	W%
1	Roger Merrett	1998	11	3	7	1	27.3
2	John Blakey	2005	1	0	1	0	0.0
3	Mark Harvey	2013	3	2	1	0	66.7

== AFL Women's ==
Statistics are correct to the end of the 2026 season.

#	Coach	Seasons	Total games					Finals games				Achievements
#	Coach	Seasons	G	W	L	D	W%	G	W	L	W%	Achievements
1	Craig Starcevich	2017–present	119	80	38	1	67.2	19	12	7	63.2	Premierships: 2021, 2023; Runners-up: 2017, 2018, 2022 (S7), 2024, 2025; Minor premierships: 2017, 2022 (S7); AFLCA coach of the year: 2021, 2022 (S7), 2023

=== AFLW acting/caretaker coaches ===
No.	Coach	Season	GC	W	L	D	W%
1	Daniel Merrett	2020	1	0	0	1	0.0

Key:

G = Games coached
W = Won
L = Lost
D = Drawn
W% = Win percentage (rounded to one decimal place)

== See also ==
- List of Brisbane Bears coaches
- List of Fitzroy Football Club coaches
