= Bill Stephen =

Australian rules footballer and coach (1928–2020)

Personal information
- Full name: William Stephen
- Born: 1 April 1928; Fitzroy, Victoria, Australia
- Died: 23 August 2020 (aged 92)
- Original team: Thornbury CYMS (CYMSFA)
- Height: 178 cm (5 ft 10 in)
- Weight: 80 kg (176 lb)

Playing career^{1}
Years	Club	Games (Goals)
1947–1957	Fitzroy	162 (4)

Coaching career
Years	Club	Games (W–L–D)
1955–57, 1965–70, 1979–80	Fitzroy	212 (67–144–1)
1976–1977	Essendon	44 (16–27–1)
Total		256 (83–171–2)
- ^{1} Playing statistics correct to the end of 1980.

Career highlights
- Fitzroy captain: 1955–1957; Fitzroy Club Champion: 1950, 1954; Sporting Life team of the year: 1952

William Stephen (1 April 1928 – 23 August 2020) was an Australian rules footballer with Fitzroy Football Club. He also coached Fitzroy and Essendon. Stephen is second all time for most VFL/AFL games coached without a grand final appearance, with Port Adelaide Football Club's coach Ken Hinkley surpassing him in 2024.

== Playing career ==
=== Fitzroy Football Club ===
Recruited from Thornbury CYMS and making his debut with the Fitzroy Football Club in the VFL in 1947, Stephen was one of the best defenders in the league. He won the Fitzroy Football Club best and fairest in 1950 and 1954 and played for Victoria 14 times. He went on to play 162 games and kicked 4 goals for the club, playing prominently from the back pocket position.

== Coaching career ==
=== Fitzroy Football Club ===
Bill Stephen coached Fitzroy as senior coach on three separate occasions from 1955 to 1957, 1965 to 1970 and 1979 to 1980. His overall VFL coaching record stands at 258 matches, 84 wins, 172 losses and 2 draws. He was sacked from Fitzroy in 1970 as he was recovering in hospital from pneumonia, and resigned from his final VFL coaching appointment at the end of the 1980 season, after coaching the Lions into the finals in 1979 for the first time since 1960. Stephen was replaced by Robert Walls as Fitzroy Football Club senior coach at the end of the 1980 season.

=== Yarrawonga Football Club ===
Stephen was captain / coach of Yarrawonga in the Ovens & Murray Football League from 1958 to 1963, then was their non playing coach in 1964. Stephen led Yarrawonga to their first O&MFL premiership against Bob Rose's Wangaratta Rovers in 1959.

Stephen was also the non playing coach of the Ovens & Murray Football League inter-league side in 1964.

=== Essendon Football Club ===
Stephen also coached Essendon as senior coach from 1976 to 1977, with a 16 win, 27 losses and 1 draw record. Stephen was sacked as Essendon Football Club senior coach at the end of the 1977 season. Stephen was then replaced by Barry Davis as Essendon Football Club senior coach.

=== Other coaching roles ===
He was also an assistant coach for South Melbourne and North Melbourne in between his stints at Fitzroy, Essendon, and St Kilda.
