= Edric Bickford =

Australian rules footballer

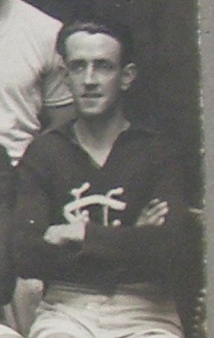
- Bickford during his Carlton career

Personal information
- Full name: Edric Dillon Bickford
- Born: 30 March 1894; Kensington, Victoria
- Died: 15 November 1956 (aged 62); Glen Iris, Victoria
- Original team: Brougham Street Methodists
- Height: 180 cm (5 ft 11 in)
- Weight: 78 kg (172 lb)

Playing career^{1}
| Years | Club | Games (Goals) |
| 1912 | Essendon | 1 (0) |
| 1920–1922 | Carlton | 21 (22) |
| Total | | 22 (22) |
- ^{1} Playing statistics correct to the end of 1922.

Edric Dillon Bickford (30 March 1894 – 15 November 1956) was an Australian rules football player and World War I veteran. He was born in Kensington, Victoria and recruited from Brougham Street Methodists.

== Biography ==
Before leaving for the War, Bickford worked as a confectioner.

== Playing career ==
Bickford played one Victorian Football League match for Essendon during the 1912 VFL season.

He returned to the VFL in 1920 for Carlton. In three seasons between 1920 and 1922 Bickford played 21 matches for the Blues.

== Military service ==
In July 1915 Bickford enlisted with the Australian Imperial Force with the initial rank of Gunner. His unit, Field Artillery Brigade 2, Reinforcement 9, left Australia in September 1915. After spending time in France and rising to the rank of Company Quartermaster Sergeant, he returned to Australia in August 1919.
