= List of Collingwood Football Club coaches =

The following is a list of coaches who have coached the Collingwood Football Club in a game of Australian rules football in the Australian Football League (formerly the VFL) or the AFL Women's.

== VFL/AFL ==
Image	No.	Coach	GC	W	L	D	W%	Years	Honours
	1	Bill Strickland	13	8	5	0	61.54	1904, 1908	
	2	Dick Condon	37	26	11	0	70.27	1905–1906	1905 VFL Minor Premiers
	3	Ted Rowell	12	6	6	0	50.00	1907–1908	
	4	George Angus	60	41	17	2	70.00	1909–1911	1910 VFL Premiers
	5	Jock McHale	714	467	237	10	66.1	1912–1949	1917, 1919, 1927, 1928, 1929, 1930, 1935 & 1936 VFL Premiers 1915, 1917, 1919, 1922, 1926, 1927, 1928, 1929 & 1930 VFL Minor Premiers
	—N/a	Bob Rush^{Note 1}	1*	1*	0	0	100.00	1930	
	6	Phonse Kyne	272	161	109	2	59.56	1950–1963	1953 & 1958 VFL Premiers
	7	Neil Mann^{Note 2}	72	49	22	1	68.75	1972–1974	1973 VFL Minor Premiers
	8	Bob Rose	193	121	70	2	63.21	1964–1971, 1985–1986	1966, 1969 & 1970 VFL Minor Premiers
	9	Ron Richards	2	2	0	0	100.00	1974	
	10	Murray Weideman	45	19	26	0	42.22	1975–1976	
	11	Tom Hafey	138	89	47	2	65.22	1977–1982	1977 VFL Minor Premiers
	12	Mick Erwin	12	3	9	0	25.00	1982	
	13	John Cahill	47	27	20	0	57.45	1983–1984	
	14	Leigh Matthews	224	125	94	5	56.92	1986–1995	1990 AFL Premiers
	15	Tony Shaw	88	30	58	0	34.09	1996–1999	
	16	Mick Malthouse	286	163	121	2	57.34	2000–2011	2010 AFL Premiers 2010 & 2011 Minor Premiers
	17	Nathan Buckley	218	117	99	2	53.67	2012–2021	
	18	Robert Harvey	9	2	7	0	22.22	2021	Announced as caretaker coach 9 June 2021
	19	Craig McRae	105	70	33	2	68.67	2022–	2023 AFL Premiers; 2023 Minor Premiers

- Statistics are correct as of the end of round 6 of the 2026 AFL season.

== AFL Women's ==
Image	No.	Coach	GC	W	L	D	W%	Years	Honours
	1	Wayne Siekman	21	7	14	0	33.33	2017–2019	
	2	Stephen Symonds	51	31	20	0	60.78	2020–2023	
	3	Sam Wright	35	5	30	0	16.67	2024–2026	

- Statistics are correct as of the end of the 2026 AFL Women's season.

== Notes ==
- 1: Bob Rush stood in to perform the match day coaching duties in the 1930 Grand Final, including delivering the half time address, because regular coach Jock McHale was absent on the day of the game, having fallen ill with influenza days before the game. For many years, Rush was credited with having coached the game; but after a decision in 2014 by the AFL's historians, McHale is now credited as Collingwood's sole coach in the game for the purposes of coaching statistics.
- 2: Although Neil Mann's coaching span is listed as being from 1972 to 1974 he coached the Magpies once in 1960 and again for a game in 1967 as caretaker coach.
