= Tony Franklin (Australian footballer) =

Australian rules footballer and coach

Personal information
- Full name: Anthony Franklin
- Born: 18 December 1950 (age 75)
- Original team: Penguin
- Height: 185 cm (6 ft 1 in)
- Weight: 84 kg (185 lb)
- Position: Ruckman/Half forward

Playing career^{1}
Years	Club	Games (Goals)
1974–1975	South Melbourne	32 (11)

Coaching career
Years	Club	Games (W–L–D)
1984	Sydney Swans	1 (0–1–0)
- ^{1} Playing statistics correct to the end of 1975.

Anthony Franklin (born 18 December 1950) is a former Australian rules footballer who played with South Melbourne in the Victorian Football League (VFL) during the 1970s.

Originally from the Tasmanian club Penguin, Franklin played mostly as a ruckman and half forward in his two seasons at South Melbourne. His career was dogged by recurring hamstring injuries.

He represented Tasmania at interstate football and won the Lefroy Medal for a performance against Victoria.

After leaving South Melbourne he spent some time in the VFA playing for Sandringham. Franklin rejoined the Swans as a coach, guiding the Reserves team to the 1980 VFL Reserves Grand Final, where they lost by 33 points to Geelong. When the Swans relocated to Sydney in 1982, Franklin was appointed chairman of the match committee.

When Ricky Quade was suddenly admitted to hospital with a bleeding ulcer midway through the 1984 season, Franklin filled in as senior coach for Sydney's round 14 game against Collingwood, which they lost by 31 points. He later served as their Chairman of Selectors.
